= 1929 Big Ten Conference football season =

- Sport: Football
- Number of teams: 10
- Champion: Purdue
- Runners-up: Illinois
- Season MVP: Willis Glasgow

Football seasons
- ← 1928 1930 →

1929 Big Ten Conference football standings
	Conf.					Overall
Team	W		L		T	W		L		T
No. 2 Purdue $	5	–	0	–	0	8	–	0	–	0
No. 5 Illinois	3	–	1	–	1	6	–	1	–	1
Minnesota	3	–	2	–	0	6	–	2	–	0
Northwestern	3	–	2	–	0	6	–	3	–	0
Iowa	2	–	2	–	2	4	–	2	–	2
Ohio State	2	–	2	–	1	4	–	3	–	1
Michigan	1	–	3	–	1	5	–	3	–	1
Indiana	1	–	3	–	1	2	–	6	–	1
Chicago	1	–	3	–	0	7	–	3	–	0
Wisconsin	1	–	4	–	0	4	–	5	–	0
$ – Conference champion; Rankings from Dickinson System

The 1929 Big Ten Conference football season was the 34th season of college football played by the member schools of the Big Ten Conference (also known as the Western Conference) and was a part of the 1929 college football season.

The 1929 Purdue Boilermakers football team, under head coach Jimmy Phelan, compiled an 8–0 record, won the Big Ten championship, led the conference in scoring offense (23.4 points per game), and was ranked No. 2 in the Dickinson System rankings. Fullback Ralph Welch and tackle Elmer Sleight were consensus first-team All-Americans.

The 1929 Illinois Fighting Illini football team, under head coach Robert Zuppke, compiled a 6–1–1 record, finished in second place in the Big Ten, led the conference in scoring defense (3.4 points allowed per games), and was ranked No. 5 in the Dickinson System rankings.

The 1929 Minnesota Golden Gophers football team, under head coach Clarence Spears, compiled a 6–2 and finished in third place in the Big Ten. Tackle Bronko Nagurski was selected as the team's most valuable player and a consensus first-team All-American.

Iowa halfback Willis Glassgow won the Chicago Tribune Silver Football as the most valuable player in the Big Ten. He was also selected as a first-team All-American by Collier's Weekly, the Newspaper Enterprise Association, and the New York Sun.

== Season overview ==
=== Results and team statistics ===
Conf. Rank	Team	Head coach	Overall record	Conf. record	DS rank	PPG	PAG	MVP
1	Purdue	Jimmy Phelan	8–0	5–0	#2	23.4	5.5	Ralph Welch, Glen Harmeson
2	Illinois	Robert Zuppke	6–1–1	3–1–1	#5	19.4	3.4	
3 (tie)	Minnesota	Clarence Spears	6–2	3–2	NR	22.4	6.9	Bronko Nagurski
3 (tie)	Northwestern	Dick Hanley	6–3	3–2	NR	19.1	10.6	Russell Bergherm
5	Iowa	Burt Ingwersen	4–2–2	2–2–2	NR	16.0	3.5	Willis Glassgow
6	Ohio State	Sam Willaman	4–3–1	2–2–1	NR	11.9	8.6	Wes Fesler
7 (tie)	Michigan	Harry Kipke	5–3–1	1–3–1	NR	12.1	8.3	James Simrall
7 (tie)	Indiana	Harlan Page	2–6–1	1–3–1	NR	6.4	14.8	
9	Chicago	Amos Alonzo Stagg	7–3	1–3	NR	13.0	9.2	
10	Wisconsin	Glenn Thistlethwaite	4–5	1–4	NR	9.8	8.7	Parks, Russ Rebholz

Key
DS = Rankings from Dickinson System. See 1929 college football season
PPG = Average of points scored per game
PAG = Average of points allowed per game
MVP = Most valuable player as voted by players on each team as part of the voting process to determine the winner of the Chicago Tribune Silver Football trophy

=== Bowl games ===
No Big Ten teams participated in any bowl games during the 1929 season.

== All-Big Ten players ==
The following players were picked by the Associated Press (AP), the United Press (UP), the Newspaper Enterprise Association (NEA), and/or Walter Eckersall (WE) as first-team players on the 1929 All-Big Ten Conference football team.

Position	Name	Team	Selectors
Quarterback	Glen Harmeson	Purdue	AP, NEA [halfback], UP, WE
Quarterback	Forrest Peters	Illinois	NEA
Halfback	Willis Glassgow	Iowa	AP, NEA, UP, WE
Halfback	Ralph Welch	Purdue	AP, NEA [fullback], UP WE
Fullback	Russell Bergherm	Northwestern	AP, UP, WE
End	Wes Fesler	Ohio State	AP, NEA, UP, WE
End	Robert E. Tanner	Minnesota	AP, NEA, UP, WE
Tackle	Bronko Nagurski	Minnesota	AP, NEA, UP, WE
Tackle	Elmer Sleight	Purdue	AP, UP, WE
Tackle	Lou Gordon	Illinois	NEA
Guard	Fred Roberts	Iowa	AP, UP
Guard	Henry J. Anderson	Northwestern	AP, NEA [tackle], WE
Guard	John Parks	Wisconsin	UP
Guard	Russell J. Crane	Illinois	WE
Center	Mickey Erickson	Northwestern	AP, UP
Center	Alan Bovard	Michigan	NEA, WE

== All-Americans ==
Four Big Ten players were selected as consensus first-team players on the 1929 College Football All-America Team. They were:

Position	Name	Team	Selectors
Tackle	Bronko Nagurski	Minnesota	AP, UP, COL, NEA, INS, NANA
Fullback	Ralph Welch	Purdue	UP, COL, NEA, INS [halfback], NANA, AAB
Tackle	Elmer Sleight	Purdue	AP, COL, INS, AAB
End	Wes Fesler	Ohio State	AP, INS

Other Big Ten players received first-team honors from at least one selector. They were:

Position	Name	Team	Selectors
Halfback	Willis Glassgow	Iowa	COL, NEA, NYS, LP
End	Robert Tanner	Minnesota	DW
Tackle	Lou Gordon	Illinois	NANA
Guard	Russ Crane	Illinois	CP
Guard	Henry J. Anderson	Northwestern	NANA
