= 1929 Michigan Wolverines football team =

American college football season

1929 Michigan Wolverines football
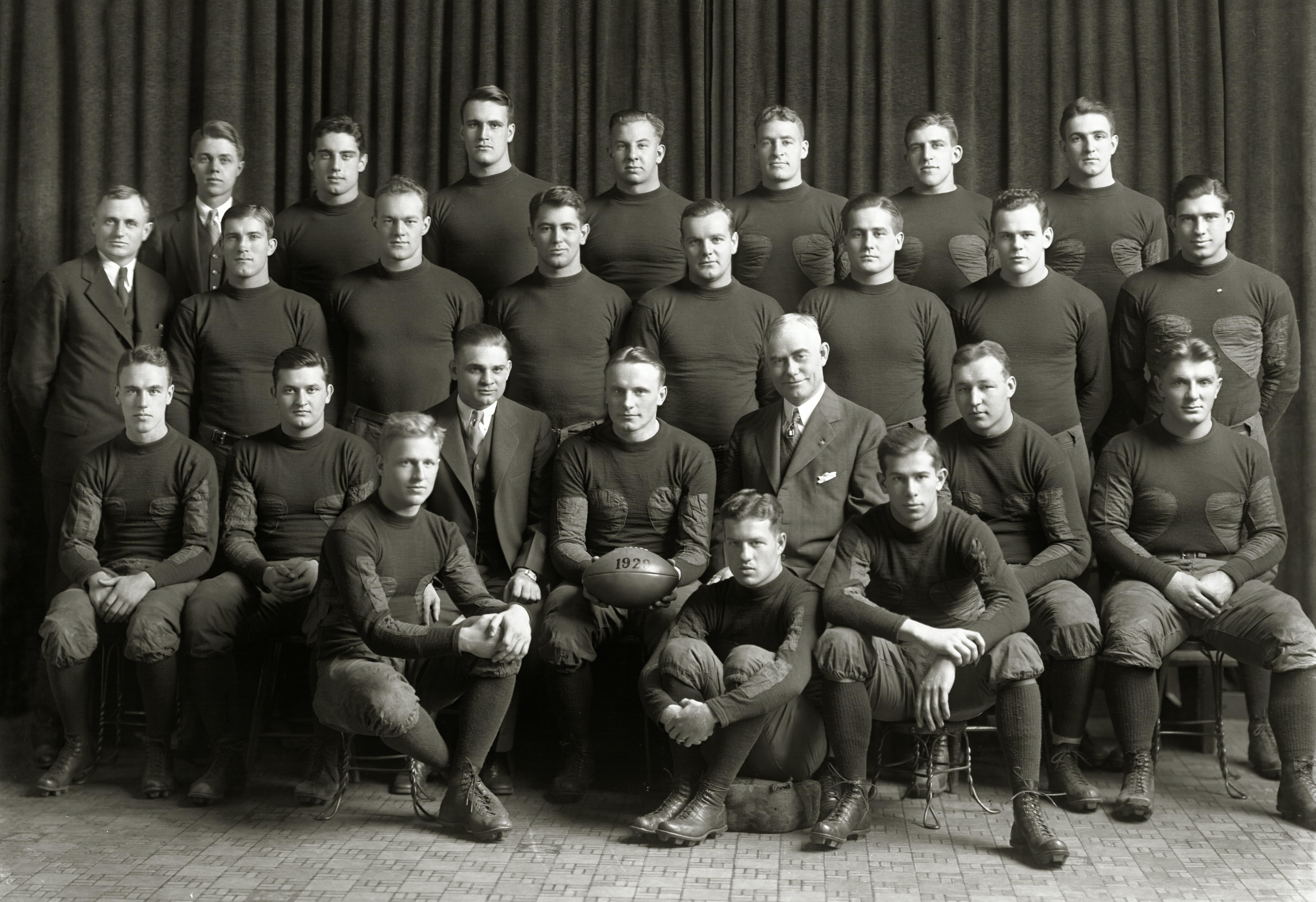
- Conference: Big Ten Conference
- Record: 5–3–1 (1–3–1 Big Ten)
- Head coach: Harry Kipke (1st season)
- MVP: James Simrall
- Captain: Joseph Truskowski
- Home stadium: Michigan Stadium

Uniform
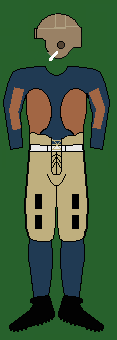

1929 Big Ten Conference football standings
	Conf.					Overall
Team	W		L		T	W		L		T
No. 2 Purdue $	5	–	0	–	0	8	–	0	–	0
No. 5 Illinois	3	–	1	–	1	6	–	1	–	1
Minnesota	3	–	2	–	0	6	–	2	–	0
Northwestern	3	–	2	–	0	6	–	3	–	0
Iowa	2	–	2	–	2	4	–	2	–	2
Ohio State	2	–	2	–	1	4	–	3	–	1
Michigan	1	–	3	–	1	5	–	3	–	1
Indiana	1	–	3	–	1	2	–	6	–	1
Chicago	1	–	3	–	0	7	–	3	–	0
Wisconsin	1	–	4	–	0	4	–	5	–	0
$ – Conference champion; Rankings from Dickinson System

The 1929 Michigan Wolverines football team was an American football team that represented the University of Michigan in the 1929 Big Ten Conference football season. The team compiled a 5–3–1 record (1–3–1 against Big Ten opponents), tied for seventh place in the Big Ten, and outscored its opponents by a total of 109 to 75. In late May 1929, Tad Wieman was removed as the team's head coach. Harry Kipke was hired as his replacement in mid-June; Kipke remained as Michigan's head football coach for nine seasons.

Highlights of the season included victories over rivals Michigan State and Minnesota and the program's first victory over a Harvard Crimson football team, after losing four prior games to the Crimson dating back to 1881. The Wolverines lost in the fourth quarter to an undefeated Purdue team that won the Big Ten championship and was ranked No. 2 nationally in the final rankings under the Dickinson System.

End Joseph Truskowski was the team captain, and quarterback James Simrall was selected as the most valuable player. Center Alan Bovard received first-team honors on the 1929 All-Big Ten Conference football team; Truskowski, fullback Joe Gembis, and guard Howard Poe received second-team honors. For the second consecutive season, Gembis was Michigan's leading scorer; he totaled 31 points on two touchdowns, 10 extra points, and three field goals for the 1929 season.

== Schedule ==
Date	Opponent	Site	Result	Attendance	Source
September 29	Albion*	Michigan Stadium; Ann Arbor, MI	W 39–0	16,412	
September 29	Mount Union*	Michigan Stadium; Ann Arbor, MI	W 16–6	16,412	
October 5	Michigan State*	Michigan Stadium; Ann Arbor, MI (rivalry)	W 17–0	30,494	
October 12	at Purdue	Ross–Ade Stadium; West Lafayette, IN	L 16–30	18,484	
October 19	Ohio State	Michigan Stadium; Ann Arbor, MI (rivalry)	L 0–7	85,088	
October 26	at Illinois	Memorial Stadium; Champaign, IL (rivalry)	L 0–14	53,403	
November 9	Harvard*^{†}	Michigan Stadium; Ann Arbor, MI	W 14–12	85,042	
November 16	at Minnesota	Memorial Stadium; Minneapolis, MN (Little Brown Jug)	W 7–6	58,160	
November 23	Iowa	Michigan Stadium; Ann Arbor, MI	T 0–0	50,619	
*Non-conference game; ^{†}Homecoming

== Season summary ==
=== Preseason ===
The 1928 Michigan team compiled a disappointing 3–4–1 record under head coach Tad Wieman. After months of strained relations between Wieman and athletic director Fielding H. Yost, Wieman was removed as the team's head coach in late May 1929. Two weeks later, Harry Kipke was hired as Michigan's new head coach. Kipke was an All-American halfback at Michigan in 1924 and had served as the head coach at Michigan Agricultural College in 1928. Upon being hired by Michigan, Kipke said, "Coaching Michigan is the greatest football job in America. I would be foolish to turn down such an offer. It has been one of my greatest ambitions in life."

=== Week 1 doubleheader ===
==== Albion ====
Week 1a: Albion at Michigan

Team	1	2	3	4	Total
Albion	0	0	0	0	0
• Michigan	14	7	6	12	39

- Date: September 29
- Location: Michigan Stadium
- Game attendance: > 50,000

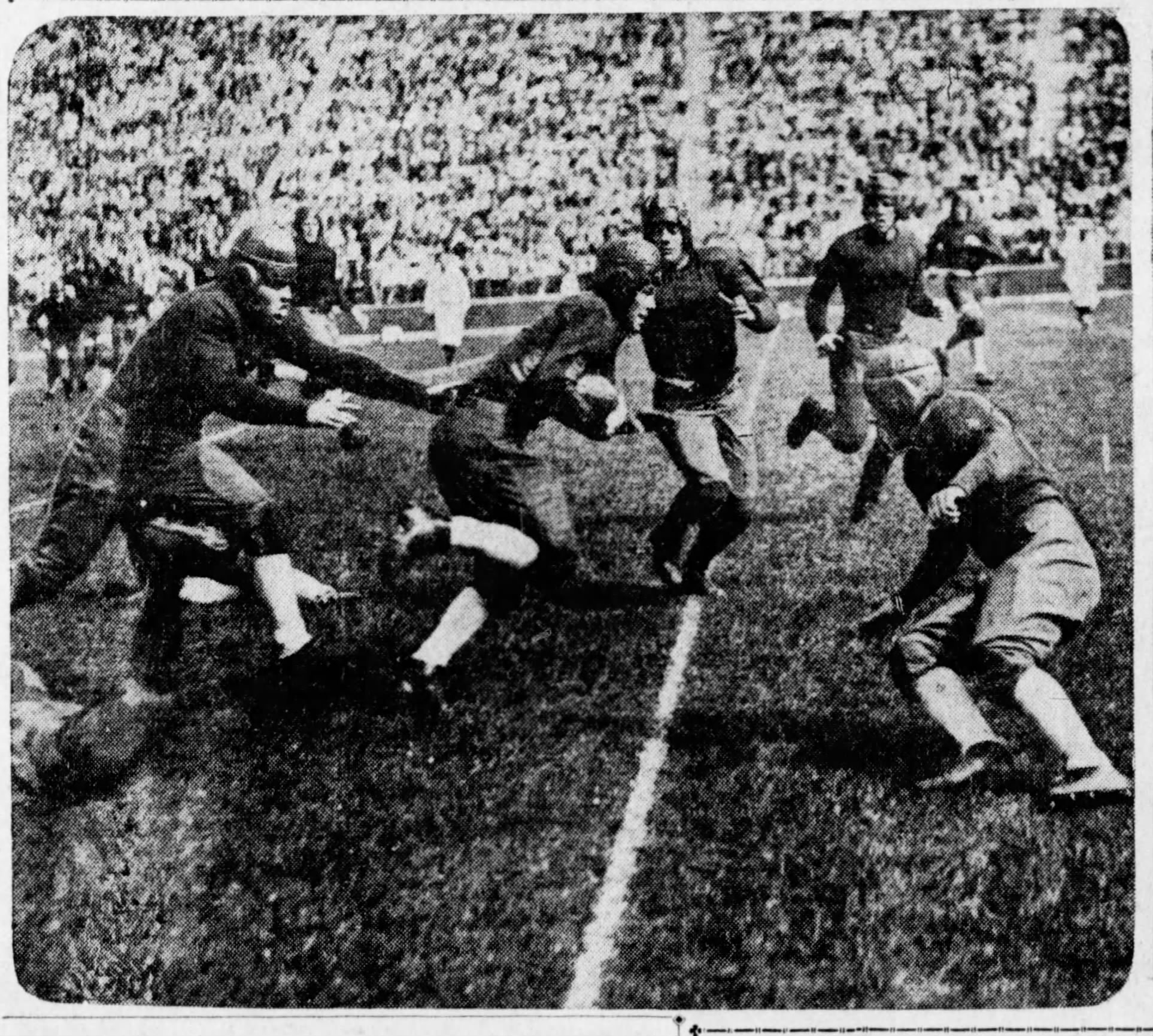
Jack Wheeler about to score one of his two touchdowns in the game vs. Albion

On September 29, 1929, Michigan opened the Kipke era with a doubleheader at Michigan Stadium before a crowd of more than 50,000 persons. In the first game, the Wolverines defeated Albion, 39–0. Coach Kipke played 40 men in the doubleheader, seeking to assess the strength of his players. The Wolverines held Albion to 14 rushing yards and one first down in the game. On offense, the Wolverines scored six touchdowns, two by Jack Wheeler and one each by Omer LaJeunesse, Kirk Holland, John Widman, and Jennings McBride. Joe Gembis added three extra points.

==== Mount Union ====
Week 1b: Mt. Union at Michigan

Team	1	2	3	4	Total
Mount Union	0	0	6	0	6
• Michigan	0	3	7	6	16

- Date: September 29
- Location: Michigan Stadium
- Game attendance: > 50,000

In the second game of the doubleheader, Michigan defeated Mount Union, 16–6. Michigan was held to three points in the first half, as Mount Union proved to be a tougher opponent than Albion. Mount Union scored a touchdown in the third quarter when its end, Raber, intercepted a lateral pass from James Simrall to Alvin Dahlem and returned it 88 yards. Michigan's scoring came on a 37-yard field goal by Joe Gembis, touchdowns by Dahlem and Gembis, and an extra point from Gembis.

=== Week 2: Michigan State ===
Week 2: Michigan State at Michigan

Team	1	2	3	4	Total
Michigan State	0	0	0	0	0
• Michigan	7	3	0	7	17

- Date: October 5
- Location: Michigan Stadium
- Game attendance: 30,494

On October 5, 1929, Michigan won its rivalry game against Michigan State by a 17–0 score before a crowd of 38,000 at Michigan Stadium. Harry Kipke had coached the Michigan State team in 1928 but switched to Michigan for the 1929 season. The loss was the 15th in a row for Michigan State against Michigan. Left halfback Roy Hudson gained 190 yards, including an 80-yard touchdown run in the fourth quarter. Fullback Joe Gembis tallied 11 points on a touchdown run, a field goal, and two kicks for extra point.

=== Week 3: at Purdue ===
Week 3: Michigan at Purdue

Team	1	2	3	4	Total
Michigan	0	0	16	0	16
• Purdue	0	6	0	24	30

- Date: October 12
- Location: Ross–Ade Stadium, West Lafayette, IN
- Game attendance: 18,484

On October 12, 1929, Michigan lost to Purdue, 30–16, before a crowd of 18,484 at Ross–Ade Stadium in West Lafayette, Indiana. In a game of shifting momentum, the Boilermakers dominated the first half and took a 6-0 lead in the second quarter on a 35-yard run by "Pest" Welch. In the third quarter, Michigan had the momentum and scored 16 points to take a 16-6 lead. Michigan's scoring began with a field goal by Joe Gembis. Then Michigan tackle Eddie Hayden blocked Welch's punt, caught the ball, and ran for a touchdown. On the next drive, Welch's punt was hurried and went out of bounds at the Purdue 28-yard line. Roy Hudson ran for a touchdown, and Gembis kicked the extra point. Momentum shifted back to Purdue in the final quarter, as the Boilermakers scored 24 points, including two touchdown runs by Alex Yunevich. Purdue, coached by James Phelan, went on to an undefeated season, a Big Ten championship, and a No. 2 ranking (behind Notre Dame) in the final rankings under the Dickinson System.

=== Week 4: Ohio State ===
Week 4: Ohio State at Michigan

Team	1	2	3	4	Total
• Ohio State	0	7	0	0	7
Michigan	0	0	0	0	0

- Date: October 19
- Location: Michigan Stadium
- Game attendance: 85,088

On October 19, 1929, Michigan lost its rivalry game with Ohio State by a 7–0 score before an estimated crowd of 90,000 persons at Michigan Stadium. The crowd included 22,000 Ohio State students and alumni. Ohio State scored in the second quarter on a pass from quarterback Alan M. Holman to right end Wes Fesler. The Buckeyes' touchdown followed a James Simrall punt from behind the Michigan goal line that went out of bounds at the Wolverines' 30-yard line. Michigan twice drove within Ohio State's five-yard line but was unable to score.

=== Week 5: at Illinois ===
Week 5: Michigan at Illinois

Team	1	2	3	4	Total
Michigan	0	0	0	0	0
• Illinois	0	0	14	0	14

- Date: October 26
- Location: Memorial Stadium, Champaign, IL
- Game attendance: 53,403

On October 26, 1929, Michigan lost to Illinois by a 14–0 score before a homecoming crowd of 53,403 at Memorial Stadium in Champaign, Illinois. Illinois scored twice in the third quarter. Quarterback Douglas Mills scored the first touchdown on a 75-yard run. Later in the quarter, Frank Walker intercepted a pass from Joseph Truskowski and returned it 60 yards to Michigan's eight-yard line. A few plays later, Walker ran seven yards for a touchdown.

=== Week 6: Harvard ===
Week 6: Harvard at Michigan

Team	1	2	3	4	Total
Harvard	6	0	0	6	12
• Michigan	0	7	0	7	14

- Date: November 16
- Location: Michigan Stadium
- Game attendance: 85,042

On November 9, 1929, Michigan defeated Harvard, 14–12, before a homecoming crowd of 85,042 persons at Michigan Stadium. The victory was Michigan's first against a Harvard team, having lost four prior games dating back to 1881. Roy Hudson and Maynard Morrison scored Michigan's touchdowns and Joe Gembis kicked the extra points.

=== Week 7: at Minnesota ===
Week 7: Michigan at Minnesota

Team	1	2	3	4	Total
• Michigan	0	0	0	7	7
Minnesota	0	6	0	0	6

- Date: November 16
- Location: Memorial Stadium, Minneapolis
- Game attendance: 58,160

On November 16, 1929, Michigan won the Little Brown Jug game against a Minnesota team featuring Bronko Nagurski and Biggie Munn. The Wolverines won by a 7–6 score before a homecoming crowd estimated at 60,000 at Memorial Stadium in Minneapolis. Minnesota halfback Clint Riebeth scored a touchdown in the second quarter, but the Golden Gophers missed the kick for extra point and led, 6–0, at halftime. In the fourth quarter, Michigan blocked a punt to gain good field position. Quarterback James Simrall then took the ball, ran to the left side, tossed the ball to halfback Joe Gembis, and Gembis then passed to Donald Wilson for a long gain. Fullback Maynard Morrison ran for the touchdown, Gembis kicked the extra point, and Michigan secured its margin of victory. Michigan out-gained Minnesota by 203 yards from scrimmage to 197.

=== Week 8: Iowa ===
Week 8: Iowa at Michigan

Team	1	2	3	4	Total
Iowa	0	0	0	0	0
Michigan	0	0	0	0	0

- Date: November 23
- Location: Michigan Stadium
- Game attendance: 50,619

On November 23, 1929, Michigan concluded its season with a scoreless tie against Iowa before a crowd of 50,619 at Michigan Stadium. Iowa twice drove past Michigan's five-yard line, once to the one-yard line, but the Michigan defense stopped both drives on downs. In the fourth quarter, Joe Gembis attempted a field goal from placement on the 25-yard line, but the ball narrowly went right of the post.

== Personnel ==
=== Varsity letter winners ===
The following players won varsity letters for their work on the 1929 football team: Players who started at least five of Michigan's nine games are displayed in bold.

- **Howie Auer** - started 5 games at right tackle, 2 games at left tackle
- **Alan Bovard** - started 9 games at center
- Francis M. Cornwell - started 1 game at right end
- Norman J. Daniels - started 2 games at right halfback
- **Alvin G. Dahlem** - started 3 games at right halfback, 2 games at left halfback
- **Leo Draveling** - started 8 games at right end, 1 game at right tackle
- **Joe Gembis** - started 5 games at fullback, 3 games at right halfback
- **Edward W. Hayden** - started 5 games at left tackle, 1 game at right tackle
- William M. Heston - halfback
- Bill Hewitt - started 2 games at left end, 1 game at right end
- **Martin R. "Roy" Hudson** - started 6 games at left halfback
- Maynard Morrison - started 2 games at fullback, 1 game at left tackle
- Ray F. Parker - guard
- **Howard W. Poe** - guard; started 8 games at left guard, 1 game at right guard
- Edwin B. Poorman - tackle; started 1 game at left tackle, 1 game at right tackle
- Thomas G. Roach - started 1 game at right tackle
- **James Simrall** - started 8 games at quarterback, 1 game at left halfback
- Thorvald C. Sorenson - tackle
- **Alfred E. Steinke** - started 8 games at right guard, 1 games at left guard
- **Joe Truskowski** - end; started 7 games at left end, 1 game at quarterback, 1 game at right halfback
- Jack Wheeler - started 2 games at fullback
- Donald L. Wilson - halfback

=== aMa letter winners ===
The following players won aMa letters for their work on the 1929 football team:

- Carl J. Bauer - guard
- Milton Bergman - tackle
- Albert Berkowitz - back
- Max Blaine
- Frank P. Brown - quarterback
- William A. Brown - center
- Arthur W. Decker - guard
- Ira L. Grinnell - guard
- Nyal R. Hayes - end
- Kirk Holland - quarterback
- Thomas G. Justice - end
- Omer LaJeunesse - fullback
- Harold D. Lindsay - back
- Harold Miller - back
- R. O. Morgan - guard
- Murray Mosser - end
- S. H. Preoulman
- Raymond Priest - back
- Karl S. Richardson - guard
- Tom C. Samuels - guard
- Frederick B. Schantz - back
- Jay H. Sikkenga - end
- Ivan C. Smith - end
- John C. Widman - back
- Ralph Wills - back

=== Awards and honors ===
- Captain: Joseph Truskowski
- All-Conference: Alan Bovard
- Most Valuable Player: James Simrall
- Meyer Morton Award: Roy Hudson

=== Coaching staff ===
- Head coach: Harry Kipke
- Assistant coaches: Jack Blott, Franklin Cappon, Ray Courtright, Cliff Keen, Bennie Oosterbaan, George F. Veenker
- Trainer: Charles B. Hoyt
- Manager: Richard B. Fogarty, Arthur Highfield (assistant), Charles Reynolds (assistant), Herbert Grosberg (assistant), Hugh Clarke (assistant)

=== Scoring leaders ===
Player	Touchdowns	Extra points	Field goals	Total
Joe Gembis	2	10	3	31
Maynard Morrison	3	0	0	18
Roy Hudson	2	0	0	12
Jack Wheeler	2	0	0	12
Alvin Dahlem	1	0	0	6
Eddie Hayden	1	0	0	6
Kirk Holland	1	0	0	6
Omer LaJeunesse	1	0	0	6
Jennings McBride	1	0	0	6
John Widman	1	0	0	6
**Total**	**15**	**10**	**9**	**109**
