= 1929 Purdue Boilermakers football team =

American college football season

1929 Purdue Boilermakers football
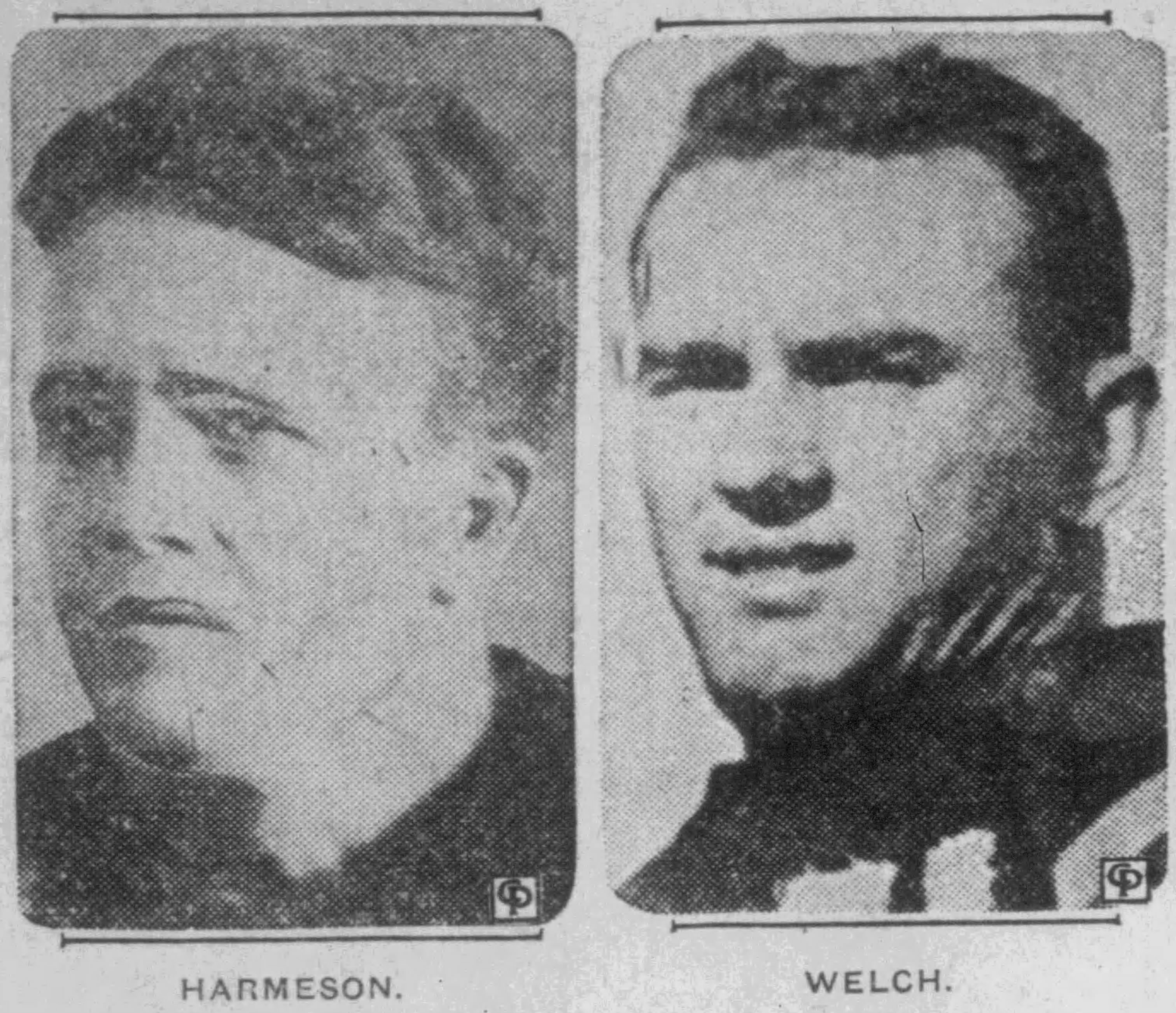
- Glen Harmeson and "Pest" Welch, two of the "Four Riveters"

Big Ten champion
- Conference: Big Ten Conference
- Record: 8–0 (5–0 Big Ten)
- Head coach: James Phelan (8th season)
- Captain: None
- Home stadium: Ross–Ade Stadium

1929 Big Ten Conference football standings
	Conf.					Overall
Team	W		L		T	W		L		T
No. 2 Purdue $	5	–	0	–	0	8	–	0	–	0
No. 5 Illinois	3	–	1	–	1	6	–	1	–	1
Minnesota	3	–	2	–	0	6	–	2	–	0
Northwestern	3	–	2	–	0	6	–	3	–	0
Iowa	2	–	2	–	2	4	–	2	–	2
Ohio State	2	–	2	–	1	4	–	3	–	1
Michigan	1	–	3	–	1	5	–	3	–	1
Indiana	1	–	3	–	1	2	–	6	–	1
Chicago	1	–	3	–	0	7	–	3	–	0
Wisconsin	1	–	4	–	0	4	–	5	–	0
$ – Conference champion; Rankings from Dickinson System

The 1929 Purdue Boilermakers football team was an American football team that represented Purdue University in the 1929 Big Ten Conference football season. In their eighth and final year under head coach James Phelan, the Boilermakers compiled an undefeated 8–0 record (5–0 in conference games), won the Big Ten championship, and outscored their opponents by a total of 187 to 44. They were ranked second nationally in the final Dickinson rankings, 1.40 points behind national champion Notre Dame and 1.60 points ahead of third place Pittsburgh.

Fullback Ralph Welch, commonly known as "Pest" Welch, and tackle Elmer Sleight were consensus first-team picks on the 1929 All-America team. Welch, Sleight, and quarterback Glen Harmeson were consensus first-team picks on the 1929 All-Big Ten Conference football team. Harmeson was the team's leading scorer with 48 points on seven touchdowns and six extra-point kicks. Purdue's four starting backs, Welch, Harmeson, Alex Yunevich and John White were known as the "Four Riveters".

One month after the end of Purdue's season, Phelan accepted the head football coach position at the University of Washington. Phelan compiled a 35–22–5 record in eight years at Purdue.

== Schedule ==
Date	Opponent	Site	Result	Attendance	Source
October 5	Kansas State*	Ross–Ade Stadium; West Lafayette, IN	W 26–14	9,000	
October 12	Michigan	Ross–Ade Stadium; West Lafayette, IN	W 30–16	18,484–20,000	
October 19	DePauw*	Ross–Ade Stadium; West Lafayette, IN	W 26–7	7,000	
October 26	at Chicago	Stagg Field; Chicago, IL (rivalry)	W 26–0	38,000	
November 2	at Wisconsin	Camp Randall Stadium; Madison, WI	W 13–0	30,000–40,000	
November 9	Ole Miss*	Ross–Ade Stadium; West Lafayette, IN	W 27–7		
November 16	Iowa^{†}	Ross–Ade Stadium; West Lafayette, IN	W 7–0	26,000	
November 23	at Indiana	Memorial Stadium; Bloomington, IN (Old Oaken Bucket)	W 32–0	25,000	
*Non-conference game; ^{†}Homecoming

== Players ==
- Horace J. Buttner, guard, No. 88, 188 pounds
- Paul R. Calvert, end, No. 73, 165 pounds
- Elbert Caraway, end, No. 38, 169 pounds
- J. M. Christman, guard, No. 78, 173 pounds
- Richard A. Chubb, center, No. 80, 192 pounds
- Harold Cloud
- Al E. Deutch, fullback, No. 21, 182 pounds
- Livy E. Eward, tackle, No. 71, 196 pounds
- William A. Fulton, quarterback, No. 17, 153 pounds
- Glen Harmeson, halfback, No. 32, 167 pounds
- Harry L. Huntsinger, end, No. 91, 162 pounds
- Howard Kissell
- William F. Mackle, end, No. 79, 167 pounds
- Ookie Miller, center, No. 76, 185 pounds
- E. A. Moon, end, No. 75, 175 pounds
- Lew Pope, halfback, No. 82, 182 pounds
- James C. Purvis, halfback, No. 24, 171 pounds
- Eddie Risk, halfback, No. 23, 172 pounds
- Les S. Sherbeck, center, No. 36, 182 pounds
- Elmer Sleight, tackle, No. 31, 193 pounds
- Don D. Trimble, guard, No. 70, 167 pounds
- George Van Bibber, tackle, No. 86, 186 pounds
- Sam Voinoff, guard, No. 66, 165 pounds
- Ralph Welch, halfback/fullback, No. 33, 189 pounds
- John A. White, quarterback, No. 27, 168 pounds
- Bill C. Woerner, end, No. 28, 155 pounds
- Alex Yunevich, fullback, No. 39

== Coaches and administrators ==
- Head coach: James Phelan
- Assistant coaches: Noble Kizer (line coach), Earl Martineau (backfield coach), Mel Alward (ends coach), Cotton Wilcox (freshman coach)
- Athletic director: Nelson A. Kellogg
