= Jim Moretti =

American football coach and administrator (born c. 1951)

Biographical details
- Born: c. 1951 or 1952 (age 74–75); Hornell, New York, U.S.
- Education: Alfred University (1972); State University of New York College at Cortland (1975)

Playing career
- 1969–1971: Alfred
- Position: Quarterback

Coaching career (HC unless noted)
- 1972: Alfred (QB)
- 1973–after 1974: Cortland (RB)
- 1979–1984: Alfred (RB)
- 1985–1997: Alfred

Administrative career (AD unless noted)
- 1997–2012: Alfred

Head coaching record
- Overall: 70–57–2

Accomplishments and honors

Championships
- 1 ICAC (1989)

Awards
- Third-Team Little All-American (1971)

James Moretti (born c. 1951 or 1952) is an American former college administrator and college football coach. He was the athletic director and head football coach for Alfred University from 1997 to 2012 and 1986 to 1997 respectively.

== Playing career ==
Moretti grew up and played high school football for Hornell High School in Hornell, New York. He set the school's single-season passing record in 1967 as he threw for 938 yards. He finished his high school career with 1,970 yards. Moretti committed to play college football for Alfred University. He was the starting quarterback for the team's undefeated 1971 season. They also won the Lambert Bowl and were Independent College Athletic Conference (ICAC) champions. Following the season he was named to the Little All-American football team. By the time he finished his career with Alfred, he owned the school's passing records.

== Coaching career ==
Following Moretti's graduation he joined his alma mater, Alfred University, as a volunteer quarterbacks coach under head coach Alex Yunevich. After one season he joined the school's rival, Cortland, under head coach Roger Robinson as a volunteer running backs coach. After taking a break from coaching he returned to Alfred as the team's running backs coach. In 1985, he was named as the successor to Sam Sanders. In thirteen years with Alfred he amassed an overall record of 70–57–2 and won the ICAC championship in 1989—which was his best season overall. He resigned following the 1997 season to become the school's athletic director despite initially claiming that he would stay as head football coach for at least the 1998 season.

== Personal life and administrative career ==
In 1997, Moretti was named athletic director for Alfred University. In 1999, he was a part of the administration that dropped track and field from its athletic program. He resigned in 2012.

Around 1978, Moretti served as a physical education teacher for Brighton High School.

In 1982, Moretti was voted into the Alfred Saxons Hall of Fame and in 2021 the 1971 ICAC championship team he was a member of was also voted into the Hall of Fame.

== Head coaching record ==
Year	Team	Overall	Conference	Standing	Bowl/playoffs
Alfred Saxons (Independent College Athletic Conference) (1985–1989)
1985	Alfred	5–5	0–3	5th	
1986	Alfred	9–2	2–1	2nd	
1987	Alfred	6–3–1	2–1	2nd	
1988	Alfred	6–2–1	1–2	4th	
1989	Alfred	9–2	3–0	1st	
Alfred Saxons (NCAA Division III independent) (1990–1995)
1990	Alfred	4–6			
1991	Alfred	7–3			
1992	Alfred	4–6			
1993	Alfred	4–6			
1994	Alfred	6–3–1			
1995	Alfred	4–5			
Alfred Saxons (Presidents' Athletic Conference) (1996–1997)
1996	Alfred	4–6	4–1	2nd	
1997	Alfred	2–8	1–4	5th	
Alfred:		70–57–2	13–12		
Total:		70–57–2			
National championship Conference title Conference division title or championship game berth
