= Sam T. Selby =

American football and basketball coach

Playing career

Football
- 1928-1930: Ohio State
- Position: Guard

Coaching career (HC unless noted)

Football
- 1931: Port Clinton HS (OH)
- 1932–1938: Wyoming HS (OH)
- 1939–1941: Otterbein
- 1945–1948: Ohio State (assistant)

Basketball
- 1939–1942: Otterbein

Head coaching record
- Overall: 8–16 (college football); 22–32 (college basketball)

Accomplishments and honors

Awards
- All-Big Ten-2nd Team (1929); All-American-3rd Team (1930)

Sam T. Selby was an American football and basketball coach.

== Early life ==
Selby attended Middletown High School, where he played football under Elmo Lingrell. He then attended and graduated from Ohio State University. He played guard for the Buckeyes football team under both coach John Wilce and coach Sam Willaman. He lettered in the 1928, 1929, and 1930 seasons. In the 1929 game against arch-rival Michigan, he recovered a critical fumble that helped the Buckeyes to a 7–0 victory. During the 1930 season, Selby blocked a punt that resulted in safety preventing a shut out by Northwestern University. At the end of his final season of football, Selby was recognized for his gridiron career in several ways. He was named 3rd team All-America by the Central Press Association. He was also honored by being selected play in the 1930 East-West Shrine Bowl All-Star game in San Francisco.

== Coaching career ==
After college, he was the head football coach for one season at Port Clinton High School, followed by seven seasons at Wyoming High School. In 1939, Selby accepted a position at Otterbein University in Westerville, Ohio, where he served as head coach and director of athletics. He served as the head football coach from 1939 to 1941. Coach Selby took over an Otterbein team that had only won one game the season before. After a winless season in his first year and a 3–5 season his second, his team was able to finish the 1941 season with a winning record. He also served as Otterbein's head men's basketball coach from 1939 to 1942.

In 1942 he was granted a leave of absence from Otterbein to enter the US Navy, where he rose to the rank of Lieutenant Commander. He was first stationed in Lakehurst, New Jersey, where he served as a physical training officer with the Atlantic Fleet Air Force. Eventually, he moved on to Naval Air Station in Glenview, Illinois, where Welfare and Recreation Officer.

After being discharged from the Navy, he officially resigned as director of athletics at Otterbein to accept a job as an assistant football coach at the Ohio State University. He served as an assistant coach for the Buckeyes from 1945 to 1948. In the first two years, he served as assistant line coach and the next two years as the freshman coach.

== Later life ==
After resigning from coaching, Selby remained in the Columbus, Ohio area and take a position with Equitable Life Insurance.

== Head coaching record ==
=== College football ===
Year	Team	Overall	Conference	Standing	Bowl/playoffs
Otterbein Cardinals (Ohio Athletic Conference) (1939–1941)
1939	Otterbein	0–8	0–7	T–17th	
1940	Otterbein	3–5	1–4	15th	
1941	Otterbein	5–3	4–2	8th	
Otterbein:		8–16	5–13		
Total:		8–16			
