= 1929 Wisconsin Badgers football team =

American college football season

1929 Wisconsin Badgers football
- Conference: Big Ten Conference
- Record: 4–5 (1–4 Big Ten)
- Head coach: Glenn Thistlethwaite (3rd season)
- MVP: Harold Rebholz
- Captain: John Parks
- Home stadium: Camp Randall Stadium

1929 Big Ten Conference football standings
	Conf.					Overall
Team	W		L		T	W		L		T
No. 2 Purdue $	5	–	0	–	0	8	–	0	–	0
No. 5 Illinois	3	–	1	–	1	6	–	1	–	1
Minnesota	3	–	2	–	0	6	–	2	–	0
Northwestern	3	–	2	–	0	6	–	3	–	0
Iowa	2	–	2	–	2	4	–	2	–	2
Ohio State	2	–	2	–	1	4	–	3	–	1
Michigan	1	–	3	–	1	5	–	3	–	1
Indiana	1	–	3	–	1	2	–	6	–	1
Chicago	1	–	3	–	0	7	–	3	–	0
Wisconsin	1	–	4	–	0	4	–	5	–	0
$ – Conference champion; Rankings from Dickinson System

The 1929 Wisconsin Badgers football team was an American football team that represented the University of Wisconsin in the 1929 Big Ten Conference football season. The team compiled a 4–5 record (1–4 against conference opponents), finished in last place in the Big Ten Conference, and outscored all opponents by a combined total of 88 to 78. Glenn Thistlethwaite was in his third year as Wisconsin's head coach.

Fullback Harold Rebholz was selected as the team's most valuable player. Guard John Parks was the team captain. Parks was also selected by the United Press as a first-team player on the 1929 All-Big Ten Conference football team.

The team played its home games at Camp Randall Stadium, which had a capacity of 38,293. During the 1929 season, the average attendance at home games was 21,560.

== Schedule ==
Date	Opponent	Site	Result	Attendance	Source
September 27	Ripon*	Camp Randall Stadium; Madison, WI	W 22–0		
September 28	South Dakota State*	Camp Randall Stadium; Madison, WI	W 21–0		
October 5	Colgate*	Camp Randall Stadium; Madison, WI	W 13–6		
October 12	Northwestern	Camp Randall Stadium; Madison, WI	L 0–7		
October 19	vs. Notre Dame*	Soldier Field; Chicago, IL	L 0–19	85,000–90,000	
October 26	Iowa	Camp Randall Stadium; Madison, WI (rivalry)	L 0–14		
November 2	Purdue^{†}	Camp Randall Stadium; Madison, WI	L 0–13	30,000–40,000	
November 9	at Chicago	Stagg Field; Chicago, IL	W 20–6		
November 23	at Minnesota	Memorial Stadium; Minneapolis, MN (rivalry)	L 12–13	58,000	
*Non-conference game; ^{†}Homecoming
