= 1929 Iowa Hawkeyes football team =

American college football season

1929 Iowa Hawkeyes football
- Conference: Big Ten Conference
- Record: 4–2–2 (2–2–2 Big Ten)
- Head coach: Burt Ingwersen (6th season)
- MVP: Willis Glassgow
- Captain: Willis Glassgow
- Home stadium: Iowa Field, Iowa Stadium

1929 Big Ten Conference football standings
	Conf.					Overall
Team	W		L		T	W		L		T
No. 2 Purdue $	5	–	0	–	0	8	–	0	–	0
No. 5 Illinois	3	–	1	–	1	6	–	1	–	1
Minnesota	3	–	2	–	0	6	–	2	–	0
Northwestern	3	–	2	–	0	6	–	3	–	0
Iowa	2	–	2	–	2	4	–	2	–	2
Ohio State	2	–	2	–	1	4	–	3	–	1
Michigan	1	–	3	–	1	5	–	3	–	1
Indiana	1	–	3	–	1	2	–	6	–	1
Chicago	1	–	3	–	0	7	–	3	–	0
Wisconsin	1	–	4	–	0	4	–	5	–	0
$ – Conference champion; Rankings from Dickinson System

The 1929 Iowa Hawkeyes football team was an American football team represented the University of Iowa as a member of the Big Ten Conference during the 1929 Big Ten football season. In their sixth year under head coach Burt Ingwersen, the Hawkeyes compiled a 4–2–2 record (2–2–2 in conference games), finished in fifth place in the Big Ten, shut out four of eight opponents, and outscored all opponents by a total of 128 to 28.

This was the first year Iowa played its home games in Iowa Stadium, which was later renamed Kinnick Stadium.

== Schedule ==
Date	Opponent	Site	Result	Attendance	Source
September 28	Carroll (WI)*	Iowa Field; Iowa City, IA	W 46–0		
October 5	Monmouth (IL)*	Iowa Stadium; Iowa City, IA	W 46–0		
October 12	at Ohio State	Ohio Stadium; Columbus, OH	L 6–7	50,000	
October 19	Illinois^{†}	Iowa Stadium; Iowa City, IA	T 7–7	32,001	
October 26	at Wisconsin	Camp Randall Stadium; Madison, WI (rivalry)	W 14–0		
November 9	Minnesota	Iowa Stadium; Iowa City, IA (rivalry)	W 9–7	36,000	
November 16	at Purdue	Ross–Ade Stadium; West Lafayette, IN	L 0–7	26,000	
November 23	at Michigan	Michigan Stadium; Ann Arbor, MI	T 0–0	50,619	
*Non-conference game; ^{†}Homecoming
