= Joseph Truskowski =

American football, basketball and baseball player and coach

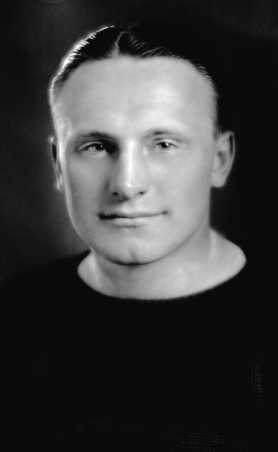
- Truskowski, captain of 1929 Michigan football team

Biographical details
- Born: c. 1906; Detroit, Michigan, U.S.
- Died: July 1959; Lion's Head, Ontario, Canada

Playing career

Football
- 1926: Michigan
- 1928–1929: Michigan

Basketball
- 1926–1927: Michigan
- 1928–1930: Michigan
- Positions: End (football); Forward (basketball)

Coaching career (HC unless noted)

Football
- 1930–1931: Olivet
- 1932–?: Iowa State (assistant)
- 1937–?: Wayne State (MI) (assistant)

Baseball
- 1936–1937: Iowa State
- 1941: Wayne State (MI)
- 1946–1959: Wayne State (MI)

Head coaching record
- Overall: 8–7–1 (football); 115–133–1 (baseball)

Accomplishments and honors

Championships
- Baseball; 1 PAC (1959)

Awards
- Second-team All-Big Ten (1929)

Joseph E. "Truck" Truskowski (c. 1906 – July 1959) was an American football, basketball and baseball player and coach. He played college football, basketball and baseball at the University of Michigan. He later served as the head baseball coach at Iowa State from 1936 to 1937 and at Wayne State in 1941 and from 1946 to 1959.

== Early years ==
Truskowski was born in Detroit in approximately 1906. He attended Detroit's Northwestern High School where he was a star athlete from 1923 to 1925.

== Athletic career ==
Truskowski played three years each at the end position for the Michigan football team and as a forward for the Michigan basketball team. At the end of the 1928 season, he was selected as the captain of the 1929 Michigan Wolverines football team. As a senior captain in 1929, he started games at three positions—left end, quarterback, and right halfback.

In basketball, Truskowski was a starting forward on the 1928–29 Michigan Wolverines men's basketball team that won the Big Ten championship. He was also the leading scorer on the 1929–30 team with 113 points in 14 games.

Truskowski also played as a catcher for the Michigan Wolverines baseball team and was the third player in Michigan history (after Harry Kipke and Bennie Oosterbaan) to win three varsity letter in the same academic year. In all, Truskowski won a total of eight varsity letters at Michigan. While a student at Michigan, he joined Theta Kappa Nu fraternity.

== Coaching career ==
Following his collegiate athletic career, Truskowski worked as a coach. He was the head football coach at Olivet College in 1931. He was hired assistant football coach at Iowa State University in March 1932. He was also the head coach of the Iowa State Cyclones baseball team from 1935 to 1937. Truskowski led Iowa State's baseball team to consecutive Big Six championships in 1935 and 1936.

In 1937, Truskowski left Iowa State to become an assistant football coach and head basketball coach at Wayne State University. Truskowski joined the Navy in 1942 and returned to Wayne State in 1945. He also served as the head baseball coach at Wayne State in 1941 and again from 1946 to 1959.

Truskowski changed his name to Joe Truske. He died from a heart attack at his summer home in Lion's Head, Ontario, in July 1959.

== Head coaching record ==
=== Football ===
Year	Team	Overall	Conference	Standing	Bowl/playoffs
Olivet Crimson (Michigan Intercollegiate Athletic Association) (1930–1931)
1930	Olivet	3–4–1	1–4	5th	
1931	Olivet	5–3	2–2	3rd	
Olivet:		8–7–1	3–6		
Total:		8–7–1			
