= Omer LaJeunesse =

American football player and coach (1908–1994)

- LaJeunesse cropped from 1931 Michigan football team photograph

Biographical details
- Born: May 4, 1908
- Died: May 15, 1994 (aged 86)

Playing career

Football
- 1929–1931: Michigan
- Positions: Guard, fullback

Coaching career (HC unless noted)

Football
- 1954–1956: Michigan Tech (line)
- 1957–1962: Michigan Tech

Swimming
- 1954–?: Michigan Tech

Head coaching record
- Overall: 18–25–2 (college football)

Accomplishments and honors

Championships
- Football; 1 NSCC (1959)

Omer LaJeunesse (May 4, 1908 – May 15, 1994) was an American football player and coach. He played football at the University of Michigan from 1929 to 1931. LaJeunesse served as the head football coach of at Michigan College of Mining and Technology—now known as Michigan Technological University from 1957 to 1962 and the head coach of the swim team from 1954 through at least 1969.

== Iron Mountain High School ==
LaJeunesse grew up in Iron Mountain in Michigan's Upper Peninsula. He attended Iron Mountain High School where he played fullback on the 1926 football team that won the title of Menominee Range champions. LaJeunesse was selected as an All-UPI fullback in 1926.

== University of Michigan ==
Before enrolling at the University of Michigan. He was a backup at the fullback position in 1929, and a starter at the guard position for the Michigan Wolverines football team in 1930 and 1931. During his two years as a starter, the Wolverines compiled a record of 16 wins, 1 loss and 2 ties. LaJeunesse received national press attention in November 1931 when he revealed that he had received an anonymous letter offering an unnamed sum of money if he would throw Michigan's football game against the Michigan State Spartans. He received bachelor's and master's degrees in physical education from the University of Michigan.

== High school coach ==
After graduating from Michigan, LaJeunesse served as a high school coach in Hillsdale, Michigan, Battle Creek, Michigan and Iron Mountain, Michigan. In 12 years at Iron Mountain, he had a winning percentage of 68% in football and 61% in basketball.

== Michigan Tech ==
In 1954, he was hired by Michigan Technological University as a physical education instructor and assistant football coach with responsibilities for the linemen. In July 1957, after three years as an assistant to Al Bovard, LaJeunesse was promoted to the head football coach at Michigan Tech. He served as Michigan Tech's head football coach from 1957 to 1962. His best season as a head coach was 1959 when he led the Michigan Tech Huskies to a 6-2 record. In his final season as head coach, the 1962 team finished 0-6-1. La Jeunesse also served as the coach of the swim and softball teams and equipment manager during his tenure at Michigan Tech. In December 1962, LaJeunesse asked to be relieved as football coach, citing the physical strain of coaching three sports. LaJeunesse continued to serve as Michigan Tech's swim coach from 1954 through at least the 1969 season.

== Family and honors ==
LaJeunesse had five sons, Ted, Dave, Tom, Jerry and Terry. His oldest son, Ted LaJeunesse, played football at Michigan Tech from 1954 to 1957.

In 1974, LaJeunesse was inducted into the Upper Peninsula Sports Hall of Fame. Michigan Tech has established the Omer LaJeunesse Scholastic Achievement Award which is given annually to a football player with the highest grade point average.

== Head coaching record ==
=== College football ===
Record table
Season	Team	Overall	Conference	Standing	Postseason
Michigan Tech Huskies (Independent) (1957)
1957	Michigan Tech	2–4			
Michigan Tech Huskies (Northern State College Conference) (1958–1962)
1958	Michigan Tech	4–4	2–2	3rd	
1959	Michigan Tech	6–2	4–1	T–1st	
1960	Michigan Tech	5–3	4–1	2nd	
1961	Michigan Tech	1–6–1	1–4	5th	
1962	Michigan Tech	0–6–1	0–4–1	6th	
Michigan Tech:		18–25–2	11–12–1		
Total:		18–25–2			
