= 1971 Alfred Saxons football team =

American college football season

1971 Alfred Saxons football

ICAC champion Lambert Bowl champion
- Conference: Independent College Athletic Conference
- Record: 8–0 (3–0 ICAC)
- Head coach: Alex Yunevich (31st season)
- Home stadium: Merrill Field

1971 Independent College Athletic Conference football standings
	Conf.					Overall
Team	W		L		T	W		L		T
Alfred $	3	–	0	–	0	8	–	0	–	0
St. Lawrence	1	–	2	–	0	5	–	3	–	0
Hobart	1	–	2	–	0	5	–	4	–	0
RPI	1	–	2	–	0	4	–	5	–	0
$ – Conference champion

The 1971 Alfred Saxons football team was an American football team that represented Alfred University as a member of the Independent College Athletic Conference (ICAC) during the 1971 NCAA College Division football season. In their 31st season under head coach Alex Yunevich, the Saxons compiled a perfect 8–0 record, won the ICAC championship, and outscored all opponents by a total of 236 to 91. The team was the second of three consecutive Alfred teams to win ICAC championships from 1970 to 1972.

The team was led by quarterback Jim Moretti. He broke all Alfred passing records, completing 259 of 604 passes for 4,085 yards and 36 touchdowns in 24 games from 1969 to 1971. He was selected as the third-team quarterback on the 1971 Little All-America college football team.

The team was inducted as a "team of distinction" into the Alfred University Athletics Hall of Fame in 2020. Nine players and staff from the 1971 team have also been inducted individually into the Hall of Fame: Alex Yunevich (head coach); Gene Castrovillo (trainer, athletic director); Henry Bzdak; Gary Eggler; John Henderson; Jim Moretti; Nick Teta; Tom Vredenburgh; and Charles Young.

The team played its home games at Merrill Field in Alfred, New York.

== Schedule ==
Date	Opponent	Site	Result	Attendance	Source
September 18	at Brockport State*	Brockport, NY	W 27–7		
September 25	RPI	Merrill Field; Alfred, NY	W 34–12		
October 2	Union (NY)*	Merrill Field; Alfred, NY	W 35–0		
October 9	St. Lawrence	Merrill Field; Alfred, NY	W 21–8		
October 16	at Hobart	Geneva, NY	W 28–21	6,250	
October 23	at Fordham*	Jack Coffey Field; Bronx, NY	W 42–33		
October 30	at Cortland State*	Cortland, NY	W 17–10	2,300	
November 6	at Hamilton*	Clinton, NY	W 32–0		
*Non-conference game
