= Michigan Tech Huskies football, 1960–1969 =

American college football seasons

1960–1969 Michigan Tech Huskies football
- Conference: Northern State College Conference / Northern Intercollegiate Conference
- Head coach: Omer LaJeunesse (1957–1962); Bill Lucier (1963–1968); Ted Kearly (1969–1972)

The Michigan Tech Huskies football program, 1960–1969 represented Michigan Technological University, known prior to 1965 as the Michigan College of Mines and Technology, as a member of the Northern Intercollegiate Conference (NIC), known as the Northern State College Conference (NSCC) prior to 1963.

Michigan Tech won three NIC championships during the 1960s:

- The 1963 Michigan Tech Huskies football team compiled a 6–2 record (4–1 in conference games) and won the NIC championship.
- The 1965 team compiled a 6–2 record (4–1 in conference games) and won the program's second NIC championship of the decade.
- The 1969 team compiled a 5–4 record (4–1 in conference games) and won the program's third NIC championship of the decade.

Michigan Tech also registered two winless season in the 1960s as the 1962 and 1967 teams failed to win a game. These were the only winless seasons for the Michigan Tech football program in the post-World War II modern era from 1946 through 2024.

Omer LaJeunesse was the team's head coach from 1957 to 1962. Bill Lucier took over from 1963 to 1968, and Ted Kearly held the post from 1969 to 1972.

== 1960 ==
1960 Michigan Tech Huskies football
- Conference: Northern State College Conference
- Record: 5–3–1 (4–0–1 NSCC)
- Head coach: Omer LaJeunesse (4th season)

1960 Northern State College Conference football standings
	Conf.					Overall
Team	W		L		T	W		L		T
Mankato State $	4	–	0	–	1	5	–	3	–	1
Michigan Tech	4	–	1	–	0	5	–	3	–	0
St. Cloud State	2	–	3	–	0	3	–	5	–	0
Bemidji State	2	–	3	–	0	2	–	6	–	0
Winona State	1	–	3	–	1	4	–	3	–	1
Moorhead State	1	–	4	–	0	2	–	7	–	0
$ – Conference champion

The 1960 Michigan Tech Huskies football team represented the Michigan College of Mines and Technology (now known as Michigan Technological University) as a member of the Northern State College Conference (NSCC) during the 1960 college football season. In their fourth season under head coach Omer LaJeunesse, the Huskies compiled a 5–3–1 record (4–0–1 in conference games) and finished in second place in the NSCC.

=== Schedule ===
Date	Opponent	Site	Result	Attendance	Source
September 17	Superior State*	Houghton, MI	W 21–0	2,750	
September 24	at Bemidji State	Bemidji, MN	W 33–8	2,000	
October 1	at Moorhead State	Moorhead, MN	W 21–6	2,750	
October 8	Winona State	Houghton, MI	W 7–0	3,500	
October 15	at St. Cloud State	St. Cloud, MN	W 13–6	2,000	
October 22	Mankato State	Houghton, MI	L 0–16	500	
October 29	Northern Michigan*	Houghton, MI	L 0–46	3,447	
November 12	at St. Norbert*	De Pere, WI	L 7–26	2,000	
*Non-conference game

== 1961 ==
1961 Michigan Tech Huskies football
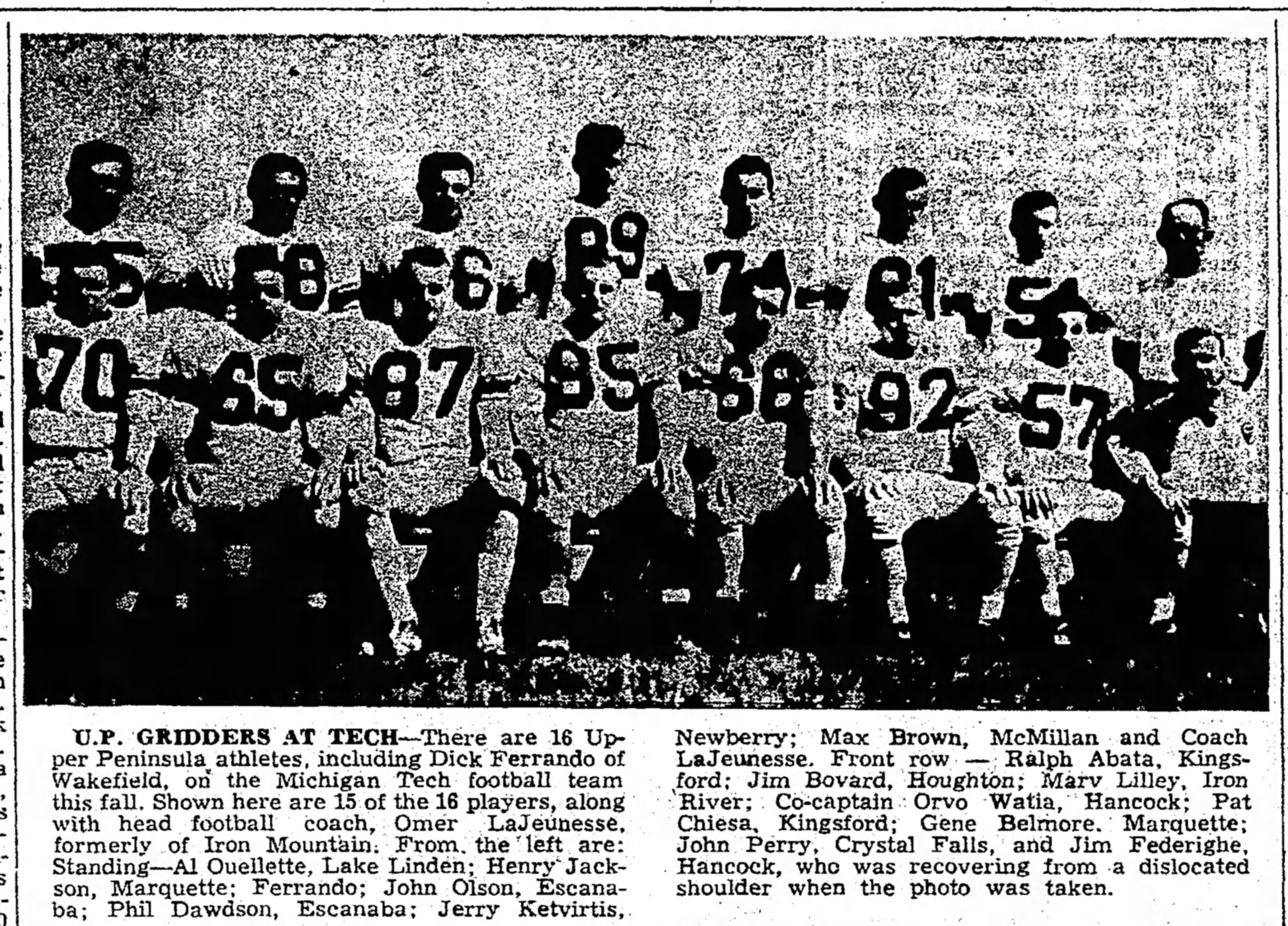
- Conference: Northern State College Conference
- Record: 1–6–1 (1–4 NSCC)
- Head coach: Omer LaJeunesse (5th season)
- Home stadium: Sherman Field

1961 Northern State College Conference football standings
	Conf.					Overall
Team	W		L		T	W		L		T
Mankato State $	5	–	0	–	0	6	–	3	–	0
Moorhead State	3	–	2	–	0	5	–	4	–	0
Bemidji State	3	–	2	–	0	3	–	6	–	0
Winona State	2	–	2	–	1	4	–	3	–	1
Michigan Tech	1	–	4	–	0	1	–	6	–	1
St. Cloud State	0	–	4	–	1	1	–	6	–	1
$ – Conference champion

The 1961 Michigan Tech Huskies football team represented Michigan Technological University of Houghton, Michigan, as a member of the Northern State College Conference (NSCC) during the 1961 college football season. In their fifth season under head coach Omer LaJeunesse, the Huskies compiled a 1–6–1 record (1–4 in conference games) and finished in fifth place out of six teams in the NSCC. They were outscored by a total of 144 to 52.

The season ended with a 61–6 defeat against Northern Michigan. It was the most points ever scored by a Northern Michigan team and the most one-sided loss Tech had suffered in the long Michigan Tech-Northern Michigan football rivalry.

The team averaged 188.7 yards of total offense per game. On defense, they gave up an average of 221.5 yards per game. Individual statistical leaders included Jack Boldt with 424 rushing yards and 32 points scored (five touchdowns and one two-point conversion) and Marv Lilley with 18 receptions for 263 yards. Quarterbacks Fred Pastori and Ralph Abata combined to complete 38 of 104 passes for 478 yards and five interceptions.

Tackle Roger Hettinga was a standout on defense.

=== Schedule ===
Date	Opponent	Site	Result	Attendance	Source
September 16	at Superior State*	Superior, WI	T 0–0	1,500	
September 23	St. Norbert*	Houghton, MI	L 6–7	1,929	
September 30	St. Cloud State	Houghton, MI	W 20–6	716	
October 7	at Mankato State	Mankato, MN	L 0–19	3,000	
October 14	Bemidji State	Houghton, MI	L 2–16	1,345	
October 21	Moorhead State^{†}	Houghton, MI	L 16–19	1,766	
October 28	at Winona State	Maxwell Field; Winona, MN	L 2–16	3,000	
November 4	No. 4 Northern Michigan*	Memorial Stadium; Marquette, MI (rivalry)	L 6–61	5,000	
*Non-conference game; ^{†}Homecoming; Rankings from AP Poll released prior to the game

== 1962 ==
1962 Michigan Tech Huskies football
- Conference: Northern State College Conference
- Record: 0–6–1 (0–4–1 NSCC)
- Head coach: Omer LaJeunesse (6th season)

1962 Northern State College Conference football standings
	Conf.					Overall
Team	W		L		T	W		L		T
Winona State $	5	–	0	–	0	6	–	1	–	1
Mankato State	3	–	2	–	0	4	–	4	–	0
St. Cloud State	2	–	2	–	1	5	–	3	–	1
Moorhead State	2	–	3	–	0	5	–	4	–	0
Bemidji State	2	–	3	–	0	3	–	6	–	0
Michigan Tech	0	–	4	–	1	0	–	6	–	1
$ – Conference champion

The 1962 Michigan Tech Huskies football team represented the Michigan College of Mines and Technology (now known as Michigan Technological University) as a member of the Northern State College Conference (NSCC) during the 1962 NCAA College Division football season. In their sixth season under head coach Omer LaJeunesse, the Huskies compiled a 0–6–1 record (0–4–1 in conference games) and finished in sixth and last place in the NSCC.

=== Schedule ===
Date	Opponent	Site	Result	Attendance	Source
September 15	Superior State*	Houghton, MI	L 0–12		
September 22	at Ferris Institute*	Big Rapids, MI	L 0–41		
September 29	Mankato State	Houghton, MI	L 6–27		
October 6	at Bemidji State	Bemidji, MN	L 12–43		
October 13	at Moorhead State	Moorhead, MN	L 18–34		
October 20	Winona State	Houghton, MN	L 0–6		
October 27	at St. Cloud State	St. Cloud, MN	T 6–6		
*Non-conference game

== 1963 ==
1963 Michigan Tech Huskies football

NIC champion
- Conference: Northern Intercollegiate Conference
- Record: 6–2 (4–1 NIC)
- Head coach: Bill Lucier (1st season)

1963 Northern Intercollegiate Conference football standings
	Conf.					Overall
Team	W		L		T	W		L		T
Michigan Tech $	4	–	1	–	0	6	–	2	–	0
Bemidji State	3	–	1	–	1	6	–	1	–	1
St. Cloud State	3	–	2	–	0	6	–	3	–	0
Mankato State	3	–	2	–	0	4	–	4	–	1
Moorhead State	1	–	3	–	1	4	–	4	–	1
Winona State	0	–	5	–	0	1	–	7	–	0
$ – Conference champion

The 1963 Michigan Tech Huskies football team represented the Michigan College of Mines and Technology (now known as Michigan Technological University) as a member of the Northern Intercollegiate Conference (NIC) during the 1963 NCAA College Division football season. In their first year under head coach Bill Lucier, the team compiled a 6–2 record (4–1 in conference games) and won the NIC championship.

The team tallied 1,261 rushing yards (157.6 yards per game) and 482 passing yards (60.2 yards per game). On defense, they gave up 1,164 rushing yards (145.5 yards per game) and 741 passing yards (92.6 yards per game). Individual statistical leaders include:

- Quarterback Ralph Abata led the team in passing (451 yards), total offense (665 yards), and punting (52 punts, 34.6-yard average).
- Halfback Doug King led the team in rushing with 296 yards on 83 carries.
- Halfback Dave Thompson led the team in receiving (15 receptions, 183 yards).
- Fullback Paul Butkovich led the team in scoring with 38 points on six touchdowns and a two-point conversion.

=== Schedule ===
Date	Opponent	Site	Result	Attendance	Source
September 14	at Superior State*	Superior, WI	W 21–0	2,750	
September 21	Ferris State	Houghton, MI	W 8–7		
September 28	at Winona State	Maxwell Field; Winona, MN	W 16–13		
October 5	St. Cloud State	St. Cloud, MI	L 6–7	2,550	
October 12	at Mankato State	Mankato, MN	W 21–19		
October 19	Bemidji State	Houghton, MI	W 14–13	2,150	
October 26	Moorhead State	Houghton, MI	W 23–14	3,110	
November 2	Milwaukee*	Houghton, MI	W 20–0	1,250	
*Non-conference game

== 1964 ==
1964 Michigan Tech Huskies football
- Conference: Northern Intercollegiate Conference
- Record: 4–4–1 (2–3 NIC)
- Head coach: Bill Lucier (2nd season)

1964 Northern Intercollegiate Conference football standings
	Conf.					Overall
Team	W		L		T	W		L		T
Winona State $	5	–	0	–	0	6	–	1	–	0
Moorhead State	4	–	1	–	0	4	–	4	–	0
Bemidji State	3	–	2	–	0	4	–	4	–	0
Michigan Tech	2	–	3	–	0	4	–	4	–	1
Mankato State	1	–	4	–	0	2	–	7	–	0
St. Cloud State	0	–	5	–	0	1	–	7	–	0
$ – Conference champion

The 1964 Michigan Tech Huskies football team represented the Michigan College of Mines and Technology (now known as Michigan Technological University) as a member of the Northern Intercollegiate Conference (NIC) during the 1964 NCAA College Division football season. In their second year under head coach Bill Lucier, the Huskies compiled a 4–4–1 record (2–3 in conference games) and finished in fourth place.

The 1964 Huskies tallied 1,372 rushing yards (152.4 per game) and 708 passing yards (78.7 per game). On defense, they gave up 994 rushing yards (110.4 per game) and 540 passing yards (60.0 per game). Sophomore halfback Tom Csmarich led the team in rushing (436 yards), total offense (444 yards), and scoring (20 points on three touchdowns and a two-point conversion). Quarterbacks Jay Dishnow and Bob Luhmann tallied 357 and 343 passing yards, respectively. End Dan Van Able was the leading receiver with 20 receptions for 294 yards.

=== Schedule ===
Date	Opponent	Site	Result	Attendance	Source
September 12	Superior State*	Houghton, MI	W 7–0	1,116	
September 19	at Ferris State*	Big Rapids, MI	T 14–14	4,500	
September 25	at Moorhead State	Alex Nemzek Stadium; Moorhead, MN	L 2–3	471	
October 3	Winona State	Houghton, MI	L 12–14	2,543	
October 10	at St. Cloud State	Selke Field; St. Cloud, MN	W 16–6	2,347	
October 17	Mankato State^{†}	Houghton, MI	W 20–0	3,204	
October 24	at Bemidji State	Bemidji, MN	L 7–35	1,110	
October 31	Edinboro State*	Houghton, MI	W 8–7	2,100	
November 7	at Milwaukee*	Shorewood Stadium; Shorewood, WI	L 8–21	4,000	
*Non-conference game; ^{†}Homecoming

== 1965 ==
1965 Michigan Tech Huskies football

NIC champion
- Conference: Northern Intercollegiate Conference
- Record: 6–2 (4–1 NIC)
- Head coach: Bill Lucier (3rd season)

1965 Northern Intercollegiate Conference football standings
	Conf.					Overall
Team	W		L		T	W		L		T
Michigan Tech $	4	–	1	–	0	6	–	2	–	0
Winona State	3	–	2	–	0	6	–	2	–	0
Mankato State	3	–	2	–	0	5	–	3	–	1
Bemidji State	3	–	2	–	0	4	–	4	–	0
Moorhead State	2	–	3	–	0	5	–	4	–	0
St. Cloud State	0	–	5	–	0	2	–	6	–	1
$ – Conference champion

The 1965 Michigan Tech Huskies football team represented Michigan Technological University as a member of the Northern Intercollegiate Conference (NIC) during the 1965 NCAA College Division football season. In their third year under head coach Bill Lucier, the Huskies compiled a 6–2 record (4–1 in conference games) and won the NIC championship.

The team's statistical leaders included quarterback Jay Dishnow with 1,039 passing yards, halfback Tom Csmarich with 499 rushing yards and 54 points scored, and end Dan Van Abel with 34 receptions for 533 yards.

=== Schedule ===
Date	Opponent	Site	Result	Attendance	Source
September 18	Ferris State	Houghton, MI	W 29–0		
September 25	Moorhead State	Houghton, MI	W 14–7		
October 2	at Winona State	Winona, MN	W 13–12		
October 9	St. Cloud State	Houghton, MI	W 29–0		
October 16	at Mankato State	Mankato, MN	W 21–12		
October 23	Bemidji State	Bemidji, MN	L 8–9		
October 30	at Northwood Institute	Midland, MI	L 13–20		
November 5	at Superior State	Superior, WI	W 26–13		

== 1966 ==
1966 Michigan Tech Huskies football
- Conference: Northern Intercollegiate Conference
- Record: 4–3 (2–3 NIC)
- Head coach: Bill Lucier (4th season)

1966 Northern Intercollegiate Conference football standings
	Conf.					Overall
Team	W		L		T	W		L		T
Moorhead State $	4	–	1	–	0	6	–	3	–	0
Mankato State	2	–	2	–	1	3	–	4	–	2
St. Cloud State	2	–	2	–	1	3	–	5	–	1
Michigan Tech	2	–	3	–	0	4	–	3	–	0
Bemidji State	2	–	3	–	0	3	–	5	–	0
Winona State	2	–	3	–	0	2	–	6	–	0
$ – Conference champion

The 1966 Michigan Tech Huskies football team represented Michigan Technological University as a member of the Northern Intercollegiate Conference (NIC) during the 1966 NCAA College Division football season. In their fourth year under head coach Bill Lucier, the Huskies compiled a 4–3 record (2–3 in conference games) and tied for fourth place in the NIC.

The team's statistical leaders included Jay Dishnow with 945 passing yards, Tom Csmarich with 479 rushing yards, Dan Van Abel with 22 receptions for 365 yards, and Hall with 57 points on nine touchdowns, one two-point conversion, and one extra-point kick. It was Cmarich's third consecutive season as Tech's rushing leader. In the Northwood game, he broke the school's all-time career rushing record previously set by Jim Lahr from 1948 to 1951.

=== Schedule ===
Date	Opponent	Site	Result	Attendance	Source
September 17	at Alma*	Alma, MI	W 13–0		
September 24	at Bemidji State	Bemidji, MN	W 18–0		
October 1	at Moorhead State	Moorhead, MN	L 20–21		
October 8	Winona State	Houghton, MI	L 14–21		
October 15	at St. Cloud State	St. Cloud, MN	L 7–12		
October 22	Mankato State	Houghton, MI	W 27–7		
October 29	Northwood Institute	Houghton, MI	W 61–8		
*Non-conference game

== 1967 ==
1967 Michigan Tech Huskies football
- Conference: Northern Intercollegiate Conference
- Record: 0–7–1 (0–5 NIC)
- Head coach: Bill Lucier (5th season)

1967 Northern Intercollegiate Conference football standings
	Conf.					Overall
Team	W		L		T	W		L		T
St. Cloud State $	5	–	0	–	0	8	–	1	–	0
Winona State	4	–	1	–	0	6	–	3	–	0
Mankato State	3	–	2	–	0	5	–	4	–	0
Bemidji State	1	–	3	–	1	3	–	5	–	1
Moorhead State	1	–	3	–	1	2	–	5	–	1
Michigan Tech	0	–	5	–	0	0	–	7	–	1
$ – Conference champion

The 1967 Michigan Tech Huskies football team represented Michigan Technological University as a member of the Northern Intercollegiate Conference (NIC) during the 1967 NCAA College Division football season. In their fifth year under head coach Bill Lucier, the Huskies compiled a 0–7–1 record (0–5 in conference games) and finished in last place in the NIC.

=== Schedule ===
Date	Opponent	Site	Result	Attendance	Source
September 16	Alma	Houghton, MI	L 7–33	1,500	
September 23	at Wayne State (MI)	Tartar Field; Detroit, MI	L 7–48	1,500	
September 30	Bemidji State	Houghton, MI	L 0–10	2,755	
October 7	at Mankato State	Mankato, MN	L 7–28	4,000	
October 14	Bemidji State	Houghton, MI	L 14–21	2,500	
October 21	Moorhead State	Houghton, MI	L 13–34	2,000	
October 28	at Winona State	Winona, MN	L 6–10	1,800	
November 4	at Ferris State*	Big Rapids, MI	T 0–0	1,200	
*Non-conference game

== 1968 ==
1968 Michigan Tech Huskies football
- Conference: Northern Intercollegiate Conference
- Record: 1–7 (0–5 NIC)
- Head coach: Bill Lucier (6th season)

1968 Northern Intercollegiate Conference football standings
	Conf.					Overall
Team	W		L		T	W		L		T
Mankato State +	4	–	1	–	0	5	–	4	–	0
Winona State +	4	–	1	–	0	5	–	4	–	0
St. Cloud State	3	–	2	–	0	5	–	3	–	1
Moorhead State	3	–	2	–	0	4	–	5	–	0
Bemidji State	1	–	4	–	0	3	–	6	–	0
Michigan Tech	0	–	5	–	0	1	–	7	–	0
Minnesota Morris *			–			7	–	1	–	0
+ – Conference co-champions; * – did not compete for championship

The 1968 Michigan Tech Huskies football team represented Michigan Technological University as a member of the Northern Intercollegiate Conference (NIC) during the 1968 NCAA College Division football season. In their sixth and final year under head coach Bill Lucier, the Huskies compiled a 1–7 record (0–5 in conference games) and finished in sixth place in the NIC.

=== Schedule ===
Date	Opponent	Site	Result	Attendance	Source
September 21	Wayne State (MI)*	Houghton, MI	L 13–23	3,250	
September 28	Mankato State	Houghton, MI	L 7–56	2,400	
October 5	at Bemidji State	Bemidji, MN	L 7–14	2,000	
October 12	at Moorhead State	Moorhead, MN	L 19–48	2,000	
October 19	Winona State	Houghton,MI	L 8–12	1,500	
October 26	at St. Cloud State	St. Cloud, MN	L 13–35	2,000	
November 2	Ferris State*	Houghton, MI	L 3–6	1,000	
November 9	at Northland (WI)		W 7–0	500	
*Non-conference game

== 1969 ==
1969 Michigan Tech Huskies football

NIC champion
- Conference: Northern Intercollegiate Conference
- Record: 5–4 (4–1 NIC)
- Head coach: Ted Kearly (1st season)
- Defensive coordinator: Doug Graber (1st season)

1969 Northern Intercollegiate Conference football standings
	Conf.					Overall
Team	W		L		T	W		L		T
Michigan Tech $	4	–	1	–	0	5	–	4	–	0
Minnesota Morris	3	–	1	–	0	7	–	2	–	0
Moorhead State	3	–	2	–	0	4	–	5	–	0
Bemidji State	2	–	2	–	1	4	–	3	–	1
St. Cloud State	1	–	3	–	1	1	–	7	–	1
Winona State	0	–	4	–	0	2	–	7	–	0
$ – Conference champion

The 1969 Michigan Tech Huskies football team represented Michigan Technological University as a member of the Northern Intercollegiate Conference (NIC) during the 1969 NCAA College Division football season. In their first year under head coach Ted Kearly, the Huskies compiled a 5–4 record (4–1 in conference games), won the NIC championship, and outscored opponent by a total of 129 to 83.

The team's statistical leaders included: halfback Larry Ras with 1,010 rushing yards and 24 points scored; Mike Scally with 459 passing yards; and tight end Al Hartman with 17 receptions for 296 yards.

=== Schedule ===
Date	Opponent	Site	Result	Attendance	Source
September 13	at Southwest State*	Marshall, MN	L 7–13		
September 20	Minnesota Morris	Houghton, MI	L 3–6		
September 27	at Winona State	Maxwell Field; Winona, MN	W 21–0		
October 4	St. Cloud State	Houghton, MI	W 3–0		
October 11	at Mankato State*	Mankato, MN	L 21–43		
October 18	Bemidji State^{†}	Houghton, MI	W 7–6		
October 25	Moorhead State	Houghton, MI	W 27–6		
November 1	at Ferris State*	Big Rapids, MI	L 6–9		
November 7	Northland (WI)*	Houghton, MI	W 34–0	1,350	
*Non-conference game; ^{†}Homecoming
