= Bob Tanner =

American football player (1907–1997)

Profile
- Positions: End, tackle

Personal information
- Born: September 27, 1907; Fairmont, Minnesota, U.S.
- Died: September 27, 1997 (aged 90); Homosassa, Florida, U.S.
- Listed height: 6 ft 0 in (1.83 m)
- Listed weight: 190 lb (86 kg)

Career information
- High school: East (MN)
- College: Minnesota

Career history
- Frankford Yellow Jackets (1930)

Awards and highlights
- Second-team All-American (1929); First-team All-Big Ten (1929); Second-team All-Big Ten (1928)

Robert Erwin Tanner (September 27, 1907 – December 8, 1997) was an American football player.

Born in 1907 in Fairmont, Minnesota, Tanner attended Marshall High School and played college football for the University of Minnesota from 1926 to 1929. He was selected as a first-team end on the 1929 All-Big Ten Conference football team. He also played for Minnesota's baseball and basketball teams. He was the first University of Minnesota athlete to win nine varsity letters in major sports.

Tanner played professional football in the National Football League (NFL) as an end and tackle for the Frankford Yellow Jackets in 1930. He appeared in 12 NFL games, eight as a starter.

After his football career ended, Tanner worked as a sales representative for the National Can Co. Ne moved to Florida in 1990. He died in 1997 in Homosassa, Florida.
