= 1929 Illinois Fighting Illini football team =

American college football season

1929 Illinois Fighting Illini football
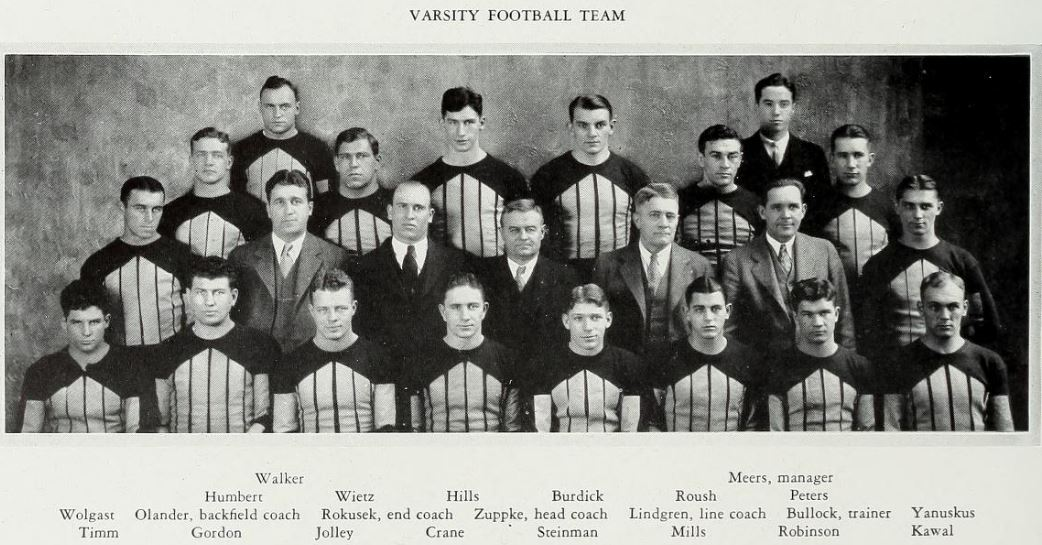
- Conference: Big Ten Conference
- Record: 6–1–1 (3–1–1 Big Ten)
- Head coach: Robert Zuppke (17th season)
- Captain: Russ Crane
- Home stadium: Memorial Stadium

Uniform
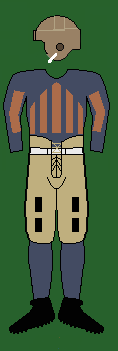

1929 Big Ten Conference football standings
	Conf.					Overall
Team	W		L		T	W		L		T
No. 2 Purdue $	5	–	0	–	0	8	–	0	–	0
No. 5 Illinois	3	–	1	–	1	6	–	1	–	1
Minnesota	3	–	2	–	0	6	–	2	–	0
Northwestern	3	–	2	–	0	6	–	3	–	0
Iowa	2	–	2	–	2	4	–	2	–	2
Ohio State	2	–	2	–	1	4	–	3	–	1
Michigan	1	–	3	–	1	5	–	3	–	1
Indiana	1	–	3	–	1	2	–	6	–	1
Chicago	1	–	3	–	0	7	–	3	–	0
Wisconsin	1	–	4	–	0	4	–	5	–	0
$ – Conference champion; Rankings from Dickinson System

The 1929 Illinois Fighting Illini football team was an American football team that represented the University of Illinois during the 1929 college football season. In their 17th season under head coach Robert Zuppke, the Illini compiled a 6–1–1 record and finished in second place in the Big Ten Conference. Guard Russ Crane was the team captain.

== Schedule ==
Date	Opponent	Site	Result	Attendance	Source
October 5	Kansas	Memorial Stadium; Champaign, IL	W 25–0	20,636	
October 12	Bradley*	Memorial Stadium; Champaign, IL	W 45–0	9,217	
October 19	at Iowa	Iowa Stadium; Iowa City, IA	T 7–7	32,001	
October 26	Michigan	Memorial Stadium; Champaign, IL (rivalry)	W 14–0	54,333	
November 2	at Northwestern	Dyche Stadium; Evanston, IL (rivalry)	L 0–7	50,000	
November 9	Army	Memorial Stadium; Champaign, IL	W 17–7	69,509	
November 16	Chicago	Memorial Stadium; Champaign, IL	W 20–6	22,792	
November 23	at Ohio State	Ohio Stadium; Columbus, OH (Illibuck)	W 27–0	64,869	
*Non-conference game
