= 1929 Minnesota Golden Gophers football team =

American college football season

1929 Minnesota Golden Gophers football
- Conference: Big Ten Conference
- Record: 6–2 (3–2 Big Ten)
- Head coach: Clarence Spears (5th season)
- Captain: Game captains
- Home stadium: Memorial Stadium

1929 Big Ten Conference football standings
	Conf.					Overall
Team	W		L		T	W		L		T
No. 2 Purdue $	5	–	0	–	0	8	–	0	–	0
No. 5 Illinois	3	–	1	–	1	6	–	1	–	1
Minnesota	3	–	2	–	0	6	–	2	–	0
Northwestern	3	–	2	–	0	6	–	3	–	0
Iowa	2	–	2	–	2	4	–	2	–	2
Ohio State	2	–	2	–	1	4	–	3	–	1
Michigan	1	–	3	–	1	5	–	3	–	1
Indiana	1	–	3	–	1	2	–	6	–	1
Chicago	1	–	3	–	0	7	–	3	–	0
Wisconsin	1	–	4	–	0	4	–	5	–	0
$ – Conference champion; Rankings from Dickinson System

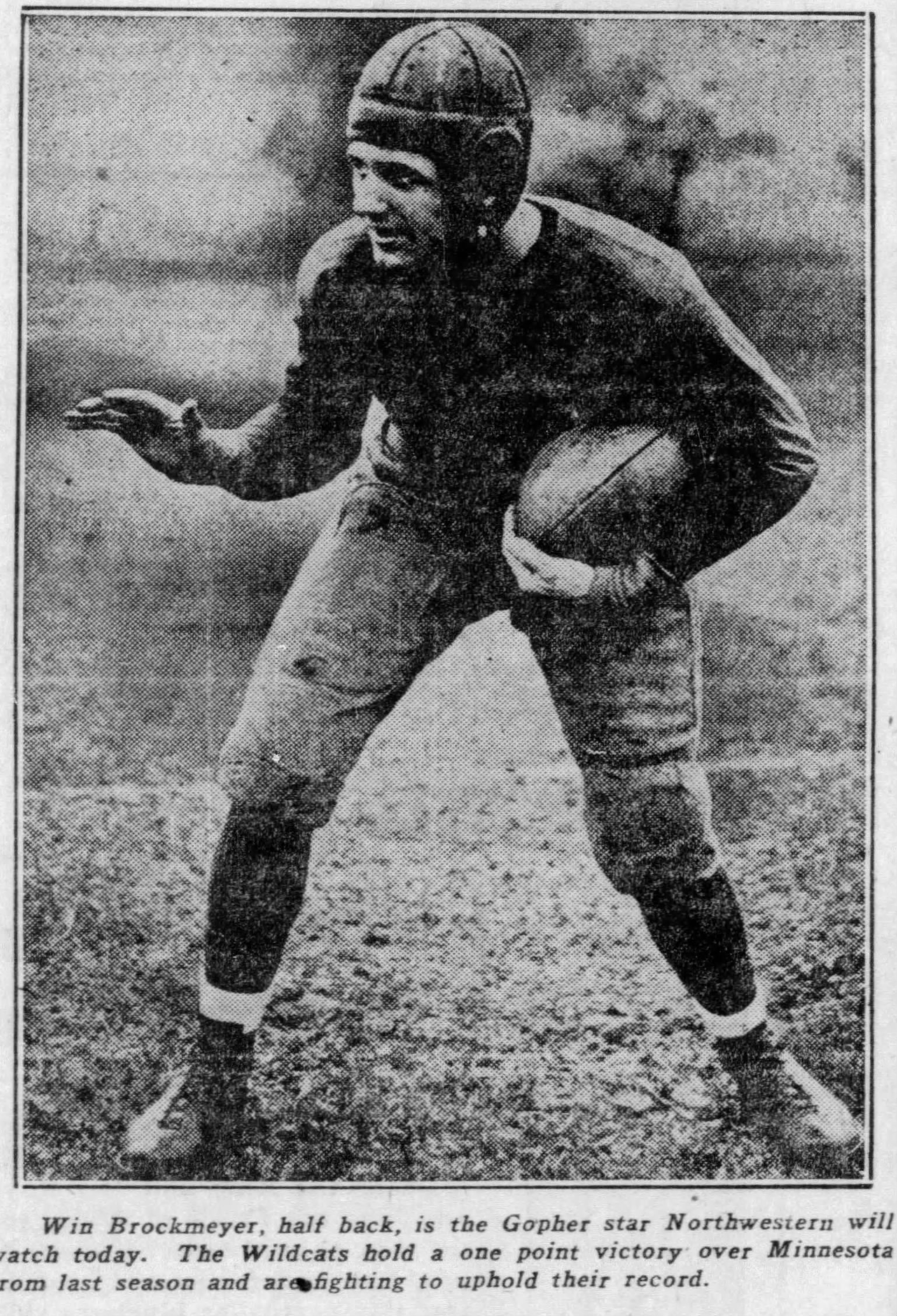
Win Brockmeyer, half back for the Golden Gophers in 1929

The 1929 Minnesota Golden Gophers football team represented the University of Minnesota in the 1929 college football season. In their fourth year under head coach Clarence Spears, the Golden Gophers compiled a 6–2 record and outscored their opponents by a combined score of 179 to 55.

Bronko Nagurski was named an All-American at fullback and tackle by the Associated Press and Look. Nagurski and end Robert Tanner were named All-Big Ten first team.

Total attendance for the season was 204,083, which averaged to 34,014. The season high for attendance was against Michigan.

== Schedule ==
Date	Opponent	Site	Result	Attendance	Source
October 5	Coe*	Memorial Stadium; Minneapolis, MN	W 39–0	25,000	
October 12	Vanderbilt	Memorial Stadium; Minneapolis, MN	W 15–6	25,000	
October 19	at Northwestern	Dyche Stadium; Evanston, IL	W 26–14	40,000	
October 26	Ripon*	Memorial Stadium; Minneapolis, MN	W 54–0	27,000	
November 2	Indiana	Memorial Stadium; Minneapolis, MN	W 9–7	30,000	
November 9	at Iowa	StadiumIowa Stadium; owa City, IA (rivalry)	L 7–9	36,000	
November 16	Michigan^{†}	Memorial Stadium; Minneapolis, MN (Little Brown Jug)	L 6–7	58,160	
November 23	Wisconsin	Memorial Stadium; Minneapolis, MN (rivalry)	W 13–12	58,000	
*Non-conference game; ^{†}Homecoming
