= 1929 Indiana Hoosiers football team =

American college football season

1929 Indiana Hoosiers football
- Conference: Big Ten Conference
- Record: 2–6–1 (1–3–1 Big Ten)
- Head coach: Harlan Page (4th season)
- Captain: Paul Balay
- Home stadium: Memorial Stadium

1929 Big Ten Conference football standings
	Conf.					Overall
Team	W		L		T	W		L		T
No. 2 Purdue $	5	–	0	–	0	8	–	0	–	0
No. 5 Illinois	3	–	1	–	1	6	–	1	–	1
Minnesota	3	–	2	–	0	6	–	2	–	0
Northwestern	3	–	2	–	0	6	–	3	–	0
Iowa	2	–	2	–	2	4	–	2	–	2
Ohio State	2	–	2	–	1	4	–	3	–	1
Michigan	1	–	3	–	1	5	–	3	–	1
Indiana	1	–	3	–	1	2	–	6	–	1
Chicago	1	–	3	–	0	7	–	3	–	0
Wisconsin	1	–	4	–	0	4	–	5	–	0
$ – Conference champion; Rankings from Dickinson System

The 1929 Indiana Hoosiers football team represented the Indiana Hoosiers in the 1929 college football season as members of the Big Ten Conference. The Hoosiers played their home games at Memorial Stadium in Bloomington, Indiana. The team was coached by Harlan Page, in his fourth year as head coach. The 1929 Hoosiers compiled 2–6–1 record and finished in a tie for seventh place in the Big Ten.

== Schedule ==
Date	Opponent	Site	Result	Attendance	Source
September 21	Wabash*	Memorial Stadium; Bloomington, IN	W 19–2		
September 28	Ohio*	Memorial Stadium; Bloomington, IN	L 0–18		
October 5	Notre Dame*	Memorial Stadium; Bloomington, IN	L 0–14	22,000	
October 12	at Chicago	Stagg Field; Chicago, IL	L 7–13		
October 19	Colgate*	Memorial Stadium; Bloomington, IN	L 6–21		
October 26	at Ohio State	Ohio Stadium; Columbus, OH	T 0–0	35,000	
November 2	at Minnesota	Memorial Stadium; Minneapolis, MN	L 7–19	30,000	
November 16	at Northwestern	Dyche Stadium; Evanston, IL	W 19–14		
November 23	at Purdue	Memorial Stadium; Bloomington, IN (Old Oaken Bucket)	L 0–32	25,000	
*Non-conference game
