= Alex Yunevich =

American football player and coach (1909–1992)

Biographical details
- Born: December 8, 1909
- Died: January 28, 1992 (aged 82); Venice, Florida, U.S.

Playing career
- 1929–1931: Purdue
- Position: Fullback #39

Coaching career (HC unless noted)

Football
- 1933: Lehigh (assistant)
- 1934–1936: Central State (MI)
- 1937–1941: Alfred
- 1942: Lakehurst NAS (assistant)
- 1946–1976: Alfred

Basketball
- 1937–1939: Alfred

Baseball
- 1937: Central State (MI)

Head coaching record
- Overall: 186–98–13 (football); 11–20 (basketball); 5–2 (baseball)

Accomplishments and honors

Championships
- Football; 7 ICAC (1965–1967, 1970–1972, 1976)

Awards
- Second-team All-Big Ten (1929)

Alexander Joseph Yunevich (December 8, 1909 – January 28, 1992) was an American college football player and coach. He served as the head football coach at Central State Teachers College—now known as Central Michigan University—from 1934 to 1936 and at Alfred University from 1937 to 1976, compiling a career college football record of 186–98–13. Yunevich played football as a fullback at Purdue University. He was a member of two Big Ten title teams for the Boilersmakers; 1929 and 1931. He was selected for the All-Big Ten team and held the school record for "longest run from scrimmage (90 yards) from 1931 thru 1974. Yunevich was also the Alfred University varsity golf coach during the 1970s.

Yunevich was an assistant coach for the 1942 Lakehurst Naval Air Station Blimps football team. He died on January 28, 1992, in Venice, Florida, where he lived during his retirement.

== Head coaching record ==
=== Football ===
| Year | Team | Overall | Conference | Standing | Bowl/playoffs |
|---|---|---|---|---|---|
Central State Bearcats (Independent) (1934–1936)
| 1934 | Central State | 5–3 | | | |
| 1935 | Central State | 2–6 | | | |
| 1936 | Central State | 3–4–1 | | | |
| Central State: | | 9–13–1 | | | |
Alfred Saxons (Independent) (1937–1941)
| 1937 | Alfred | 7–0 | | | |
| 1938 | Alfred | 4–2–1 | | | |
| 1939 | Alfred | 5–2 | | | |
| 1940 | Alfred | 6–0–1 | | | |
| 1941 | Alfred | 4–2–1 | | | |
Alfred Saxons (NCAA College Division independent) (1946–1964)
| 1946 | Alfred | 5–1 | | | |
| 1947 | Alfred | 5–3 | | | |
| 1948 | Alfred | 3–4 | | | |
| 1949 | Alfred | 4–4 | | | |
| 1950 | Alfred | 5–2 | | | |
| 1951 | Alfred | 6–1–1 | | | |
| 1952 | Alfred | 6–0–1 | | | |
| 1953 | Alfred | 5–1 | | | |
| 1954 | Alfred | 6–2 | | | |
| 1955 | Alfred | 8–0 | | | |
| 1956 | Alfred | 7–0 | | | |
| 1957 | Alfred | 2–4–1 | | | |
| 1958 | Alfred | 1–6 | | | |
| 1959 | Alfred | 0–6–1 | | | |
| 1960 | Alfred | 4–3–1 | | | |
| 1961 | Alfred | 6–2 | | | |
| 1962 | Alfred | 4–4 | | | |
| 1963 | Alfred | 2–6 | | | |
| 1964 | Alfred | 4–4–1 | | | |
Alfred Saxons (Independent College Athletic Conference) (1965–1976)
| 1965 | Alfred | 5–4 | 2–1 | T–1st | |
| 1966 | Alfred | 6–1–1 | 3–0 | 1st | |
| 1967 | Alfred | 6–1 | 3–0 | 1st | |
| 1968 | Alfred | 2–5 | 1–1 | T–2nd | |
| 1969 | Alfred | 5–3 | 2–1 | 2nd | |
| 1970 | Alfred | 7–1 | 3–0 | 1st | |
| 1971 | Alfred | 8–0 | 3–0 | 1st | |
| 1972 | Alfred | 7–1 | 3–0 | 1st | |
| 1973 | Alfred | 7–2 | 2–1 | 2nd | |
| 1974 | Alfred | 4–4 | 2–2 | 4th | |
| 1975 | Alfred | 7–2 | 3–1 | 2nd | |
| 1976 | Alfred | 4–2–2 | 3–0–1 | 1st | |
| Alfred: | | 177–85–12 | 30–7–1 | | |
| Total: | | 186–98–13 | | | |
National championship Conference title Conference division title or championship game berth
