= Mickey Erickson =

American football player (1905–1984)

Profile
- Position: Center

Personal information
- Born: May 16, 1905; Cambridge, Minnesota, U.S.
- Died: January 26, 1984 (aged 78); Phoenix, Arizona, U.S.
- Listed height: 6 ft 2 in (1.88 m)
- Listed weight: 208 lb (94 kg)

Career information
- High school: Moline (IL)
- College: Northwestern

Career history
- Chicago Cardinals (1930–1932); Boston Braves (1932)

Awards and highlights
- First-team All-Big Ten (1929)

Career statistics
- Games played: 30
- Stats at Pro Football Reference

Milton Leroy "Mickey" Erickson (May 16, 1905 – January 1984) was an American football offensive lineman in the National Football League (NFL) for the Chicago Cardinals and Boston Braves. He played college football at Northwestern University.
