= 1929 Northwestern Wildcats football team =

American college football season

1929 Northwestern Wildcats football
- Conference: Big Ten Conference
- Record: 6–3 (3–2 Big Ten)
- Head coach: Dick Hanley (3rd season)
- Captain: Henry Anderson
- Home stadium: Dyche Stadium

1929 Big Ten Conference football standings
	Conf.					Overall
Team	W		L		T	W		L		T
No. 2 Purdue $	5	–	0	–	0	8	–	0	–	0
No. 5 Illinois	3	–	1	–	1	6	–	1	–	1
Minnesota	3	–	2	–	0	6	–	2	–	0
Northwestern	3	–	2	–	0	6	–	3	–	0
Iowa	2	–	2	–	2	4	–	2	–	2
Ohio State	2	–	2	–	1	4	–	3	–	1
Michigan	1	–	3	–	1	5	–	3	–	1
Indiana	1	–	3	–	1	2	–	6	–	1
Chicago	1	–	3	–	0	7	–	3	–	0
Wisconsin	1	–	4	–	0	4	–	5	–	0
$ – Conference champion; Rankings from Dickinson System

The 1929 Northwestern Wildcats team represented Northwestern University during the 1929 college football season. In their third year under head coach Dick Hanley, the Wildcats compiled a 6–3 record (3–2 against Big Ten Conference opponents) and finished in fourth place in the Big Ten Conference.

== Schedule ==
Date	Opponent	Site	Result	Attendance	Source
September 28	Cornell (IA)*	Dyche Stadium; Evanston, IL	W 27–18		
October 5	Butler*	Dyche Stadium; Evanston, IL	W 13–0		
October 12	at Wisconsin	Camp Randall Stadium; Madison, WI	W 7–0		
October 19	Minnesota	Dyche Stadium; Evanston, IL	L 14–26		
October 26	Wabash*	Dyche Stadium; Evanston, IL	W 66–0		
November 2	Illinois	Dyche Stadium; Evanston, IL (rivalry)	W 7–0		
November 9	at Ohio State	Ohio Stadium; Columbus, OH	W 18–6	45,000	
November 16	Indiana	Dyche Stadium; Evanston, IL	L 14–19		
November 23	Notre Dame*	Dyche Stadium; Evanston, IL	L 6–26	50,000	
*Non-conference game
