= James Simrall =

American football player (1909–1982)

Profile
- Positions: Halfback, quarterback

Personal information
- Born: November 16, 1909; Lexington, Kentucky, U.S.
- Died: September 8, 1982 (aged 72); Lexington, Kentucky, U.S.

Career information
- College: Michigan

Awards and highlights
- Michigan Wolverines Most Valuable Player, 1929

James Orlando Harrison Simrall Jr. (November 16, 1909 – September 8, 1982) was an American football player and medical doctor. A native of Lexington, Kentucky, Simrall enrolled at the University of Michigan where he played quarterback and halfback for the Michigan Wolverines football teams from 1928 to 1930. He was selected as the Most Valuable Player on the 1929 team and the captain of the 1930 team. He later attended Harvard Medical School, served as an instructor in obstetrics and gynecology at the University of Michigan, and later became a medical doctor in Lexington, Kentucky.

== Early life ==
Simrall was born in Lexington, Kentucky, in November 1909. His father, James O. Harrison Simrall Sr. (1877–1934), was a Kentucky native who worked as the secretary of the city school board, personnel director, and business manager of the public schools, and also operated an insurance agency under the name, J. O. H. Insurance Agency. His mother, Kitty C. (Chenault) Simrall, was also a Kentucky native.

At the time of the 1910 United States census, Simrall was living in Lexington with his parents and an older sister, Florence D. Simrall. At the time of the 1930 United States census, his family continued to reside in Lexington, and he also had a younger sister, Kitty C. Simrall. In high school, Simrall played football and basketball and competed in track.

Simrall enrolled at the University of Michigan in 1927. While at Michigan, Simrall was also a member of the Phi Delta Theta fraternity. In February 1931, Simrall received national publicity when he was one of 70 University of Michigan students arrested in "rum raids" at five leading fraternities on the campus. In March 1931, Simrall was voted as the class athlete and the most popular man in the University of Michigan's Class of 1931.

After graduating from Michigan, Simrall attended Harvard Medical School. He returned to the University of Michigan in 1935 to perform his residency at the University Hospital.

== College football ==
He played on the freshman football team at the University of Michigan in 1927. As a sophomore in 1928, he started five games at the halfback position for the Michigan team coached by Tad Wieman. Before the 1929 season, expectations were high for Simrall. A profile of the Michigan football team in the International News Service (predecessor to the UPI) noted:

The big 'if' is a youngster named Harrison Simrall of Lexington, Ky., who is looked upon as the man to lead the maize and blue cohorts into the promised land. In practice -- at least the one we saw -- he looks like the answer to the coaches' prayer. He can kick, forward pass, and direct play in a manner that leaves little to be desired, and the experience gained last season seems to have ironed out the rough edges of his style.

Following spring practice in 1929, the Detroit Free Press reported that Simrall was "head and shoulders above all other football candidates at Michigan." Simrall started eight games as quarterback in 1929 and another as halfback in Harry Kipke's first season as Michigan's head football coach. He also handled punting for the 1929 team and set an "iron man" record by playing in 488 minutes during the 1929 season.

At the end of the 1929 season, Simrall was elected by his teammates as both the Most Valuable Player on the 1929 team and captain of the 1930 team. The International News Service wrote at the time: "James O. Simrall of Lexington, Ky., is to lead the University of Michigan football team next year. He was elected yesterday to the captaincy. Only 19 years old and weighing 160 pounds, Simrall has played a brilliant game in Michigan's backfield for the last two years." A syndicated newspaper profile on Simrall reported that "Ducky" Simrall was the youngest Michigan captain in many years and added:

Simrall has established a reputation of 'taking the gaff' at Michigan that has been equaled by few men of his size. Although he weighs but 162 pounds the Wolverines has had time taken out for him but once in two seasons, established a record for minutes played. He participated in every minute during the last seven games with Michigan State, Purdue, Ohio State, Illinois, Harvard, Minnesota and Iowa as opponents.

Another newspaper called him a "genial, quiet blonde ... well liked by all" and praised his work as a safety man: "Defensively Simrall is almost beyond reproach -- a deadly tackler and a good analyst of plays."

For the 1930 season, Harry Newman took over the quarterback position, and Simrall started eight games at the halfback position. Newman and Simrall led the 1930 Wolverines to an undefeated season and a tie for the Big Ten Conference championship. In a 13–0 victory over Ohio State, Newman completed a pass to Simrall from Michigan's 46-yard line with a minute remaining in the game. Simrall took the ball to the one-yard line to set up the first score of the game. In the final game of the 1930 season, and Simrall's last appearance for Michigan, he threw a touchdown pass to Roy Hudson from midfield for Michigan's first points against the Chicago Maroons. At the end of the 1930 season, Coach Kipke told the press that he considered Simrall to be the most valuable player and the key to the success of the 1930 team.

== Medical career ==
While a resident at the University of Michigan in 1935, Simrall became a teaching assistant in pathology. By 1940, he was an instructor in obstetrics and gynecology at the University of Michigan. He co-authored a paper in 1940 entitled, "The Effects of Vaginal Mucosa of the Sponge and Foam Powder Method Used in Contraception," which was published in Human Fertility, a journal published by the Planned Parenthood Federation of America.

He later relocated to Louisville, Kentucky, where he established a medical practice.

== Personal life ==
He was married to Irene Simrall. In 1949, he maintained his office at 332 W. Broadway in Louisville and lived at 316 Stilz Avenue in Louisville. Simrall died at Louisville in 1982 at age 72.
