= 1929 Chicago Maroons football team =

American college football season

1929 Chicago Maroons football
- Conference: Big Ten Conference
- Record: 7–3 (1–3 Big Ten)
- Head coach: Amos Alonzo Stagg (38th season)
- Captain: Pat Kelly
- Home stadium: Stagg Field

1929 Big Ten Conference football standings
	Conf.					Overall
Team	W		L		T	W		L		T
No. 2 Purdue $	5	–	0	–	0	8	–	0	–	0
No. 5 Illinois	3	–	1	–	1	6	–	1	–	1
Minnesota	3	–	2	–	0	6	–	2	–	0
Northwestern	3	–	2	–	0	6	–	3	–	0
Iowa	2	–	2	–	2	4	–	2	–	2
Ohio State	2	–	2	–	1	4	–	3	–	1
Michigan	1	–	3	–	1	5	–	3	–	1
Indiana	1	–	3	–	1	2	–	6	–	1
Chicago	1	–	3	–	0	7	–	3	–	0
Wisconsin	1	–	4	–	0	4	–	5	–	0
$ – Conference champion; Rankings from Dickinson System

The 1929 Chicago Maroons football team was an American football team that represented the University of Chicago during the 1929 college football season. In their 38th season under head coach Amos Alonzo Stagg, the Maroons compiled a 7–3 record, finished in ninth place in the Big Ten Conference, and outscored their opponents by a combined total of 130 to 92.

Fritz Crisler was an assistant coach on the team.

== Schedule ==
Date	Opponent	Site	Result	Attendance	Source
October 5	Beloit*	Stagg Field; Chicago, IL	W 27–0		
October 5	Lake Forest*	Stagg Field; Chicago, IL	W 9–6		
October 12	Indiana	Stagg Field; Chicago, IL	W 13–7		
October 19	Ripon*	Stagg Field; Chicago, IL	W 10–0		
October 19	Indiana State*	Stagg Field; Chicago, IL	W 18–0		
October 26	Purdue	Stagg Field; Chicago, IL (rivalry)	L 0–26	38,000	
November 2	at Princeton*	Palmer Stadium; Princeton, NJ	W 15–7		
November 9	Wisconsin	Stagg Field; Chicago, IL	L 6–20		
November 16	at Illinois	Memorial Stadium; Champaign, IL	L 6–20	22,792	
November 23	Washington*	Stagg Field; Chicago, IL	W 26–6	20,000	
*Non-conference game
