= Glen Harmeson =

American basketball and football player, coach, and administrator

- Harmeson pictured in Epitome 1940, Lehigh yearbook

Biographical details
- Born: March 9, 1908; Indianapolis, Indiana, U.S.
- Died: June 23, 1983 (aged 75); Lafayette, Indiana, U.S.

Playing career

Football
- 1927–1929: Purdue

Basketball
- 1927–1930: Purdue

Baseball
- 1928–1930: Purdue
- Positions: Quarterback (football); Outfielder (baseball)

Coaching career (HC unless noted)

Football
- 1930–1931: Purdue (freshmen)
- 1932–1933: Purdue (first assistant)
- 1934–1941: Lehigh
- 1946–1950: Wabash
- 1951–1952: Purdue (assistant)
- 1954: Arkansas State

Basketball
- 1934–1937: Lehigh
- 1950–1951: Wabash

Administrative career (AD unless noted)
- 1939–1942: Lehigh

Head coaching record
- Overall: 49–60–11 (football); 20–43 (basketball)

Accomplishments and honors

Championships
- Football; 1 Middle Three (1936)

Awards
- Third-team All-American (1929); First-team All-Big Ten (1929)

Glen W. Harmeson (March 9, 1908 – June 23, 1983) was an American football player, coach of football and basketball, and college athletics administrator. He served as the head football coach at Lehigh University (1934–1941), Wabash College (1946–1950), and Arkansas State College—now Arkansas State University (1954), compiling a career college football record of 49–60–11. Harmeson was also the head basketball coach at Lehigh from 1934 to 1937 and at Wabash from 1950 to 1951, tallying a career college basketball mark of 20–43.

Harmeson was a high school star in basketball, football, and baseball for Indianapolis' Emmerich Manual High School; he was awarded three varsity letters in each of three high school sports and was a three-time All-State basketball player.

During his intercollegiate career at Purdue, Harmeson was named all-Big Ten Conference in basketball, football, and baseball; he was a co-captain for the 1930 Big Ten champion basketball team with Stretch Murphy and a teammate of John Wooden and was a member of the 1928 Big Ten champions. He led the Boilermakers to the 1929 Big Ten title in football, quarterbacking them to a perfect record of 8–0 (5–0 in conference), outscoring the opposition 187–44. He was the first Purdue athlete to play on two teams in same academic year that posted undefeated conference marks. As a freshman at Purdue, he was awarded four freshman letters.

He was inducted into the Indiana Basketball Hall of Fame in 1981.

== Coaching career ==
=== Lehigh ===
Harmeson was the 18th head football coach at Lehigh University in Bethlehem, Pennsylvania and he held that position for eight seasons, from 1934 until 1941. His record at Lehigh was 23–42–5.

=== Wabash ===
Harmeson's next coaching move was to become the 23rd head football coach at Wabash College in Crawfordsville, Indiana and he held that position for five seasons, from 1946 until 1950. His coaching record at Wabash was 25–10–6.

=== Arkansas State ===
Harmeson coached the Arkansas State University football team for the 1954 season. After concluding with a record of 1–8, he retired from coaching.

== Later life and death ==
Harmeson worked at the Indiana Veterans Home from 1966 until 1978. He died on June 23, 1983, at St. Elizabeth Hospital in Lafayette, Indiana.

== Head coaching record ==
=== Football ===
Year	Team	Overall	Conference	Standing	Bowl/playoffs
Lehigh Engineers (Middle Three Conference) (1934–1941)
1934	Lehigh	4–4	1–1	2nd	
1935	Lehigh	5–4	1–1	2nd	
1936	Lehigh	6–2	2–0	1st	
1937	Lehigh	1–8	0–2	3rd	
1938	Lehigh	2–5–2	0–2	3rd	
1939	Lehigh	3–6	0–2	3rd	
1940	Lehigh	2–7	0–2	3rd	
1941	Lehigh	0–6–3	0–2	3rd	
Lehigh:		23–42–5	4–12		
Wabash Little Giants (Indiana Intercollegiate Conference) (1946–1957)
1946	Wabash	7–1	5–1	3rd	
1947	Wabash	5–1–2			
Wabash Little Giants (Independent) (1948–1950)
1948	Wabash	4–4			
1949	Wabash	5–2–1			
1950	Wabash	4–2–3			
Wabash:		25–10–6			
Arkansas State Indians (Independent) (1954)
1954	Arkansas State	1–8			
Arkansas State:		1–8			
Total:		49–60–11			
National championship Conference title Conference division title or championship game berth
