= 1929 Ohio State Buckeyes football team =

American college football season

1929 Ohio State Buckeyes football
- Conference: Big Ten Conference
- Record: 4–3–1 (2–2–1 Big Ten)
- Head coach: Sam Willaman (1st season)
- Home stadium: Ohio Stadium

1929 Big Ten Conference football standings
	Conf.					Overall
Team	W		L		T	W		L		T
No. 2 Purdue $	5	–	0	–	0	8	–	0	–	0
No. 5 Illinois	3	–	1	–	1	6	–	1	–	1
Minnesota	3	–	2	–	0	6	–	2	–	0
Northwestern	3	–	2	–	0	6	–	3	–	0
Iowa	2	–	2	–	2	4	–	2	–	2
Ohio State	2	–	2	–	1	4	–	3	–	1
Michigan	1	–	3	–	1	5	–	3	–	1
Indiana	1	–	3	–	1	2	–	6	–	1
Chicago	1	–	3	–	0	7	–	3	–	0
Wisconsin	1	–	4	–	0	4	–	5	–	0
$ – Conference champion; Rankings from Dickinson System

The 1929 Ohio State Buckeyes football team represented Ohio State University in the 1929 college football season. In Sam Willaman's first season as head coach, the Buckeyes beat Michigan. The Buckeyes compiled a 4–3–1 record while outscoring opponents 95–69.

== Schedule ==
Date	Opponent	Site	Result	Attendance	Source
October 5	Wittenberg*	Ohio Stadium; Columbus, OH	W 19–0	27,918	
October 12	Iowa	Ohio Stadium; Columbus, OH	W 7–6	50,000	
October 19	at Michigan	Michigan Stadium; Ann Arbor, MI (rivalry)	W 7–0	85,088	
October 26	Indiana	Ohio Stadium; Columbus, OH	T 0–0	35,000	
November 2	at Pittsburgh*	Pitt Stadium; Pittsburgh, PA	L 2–18	55,000	
November 9	Northwestern	Ohio Stadium; Columbus, OH	L 6–18	45,000	
November 16	Kenyon*	Ohio Stadium; Columbus, OH	W 54–0	12,600	
November 23	Illinois	Ohio Stadium; Columbus, OH (Illibuck)	L 0–27	64,869	
*Non-conference game

== Coaching staff ==
- Sam Willaman, head coach, first year
