= Bronko Nagurski =

Canadian-American football player and professional wrestler (1908–1990)

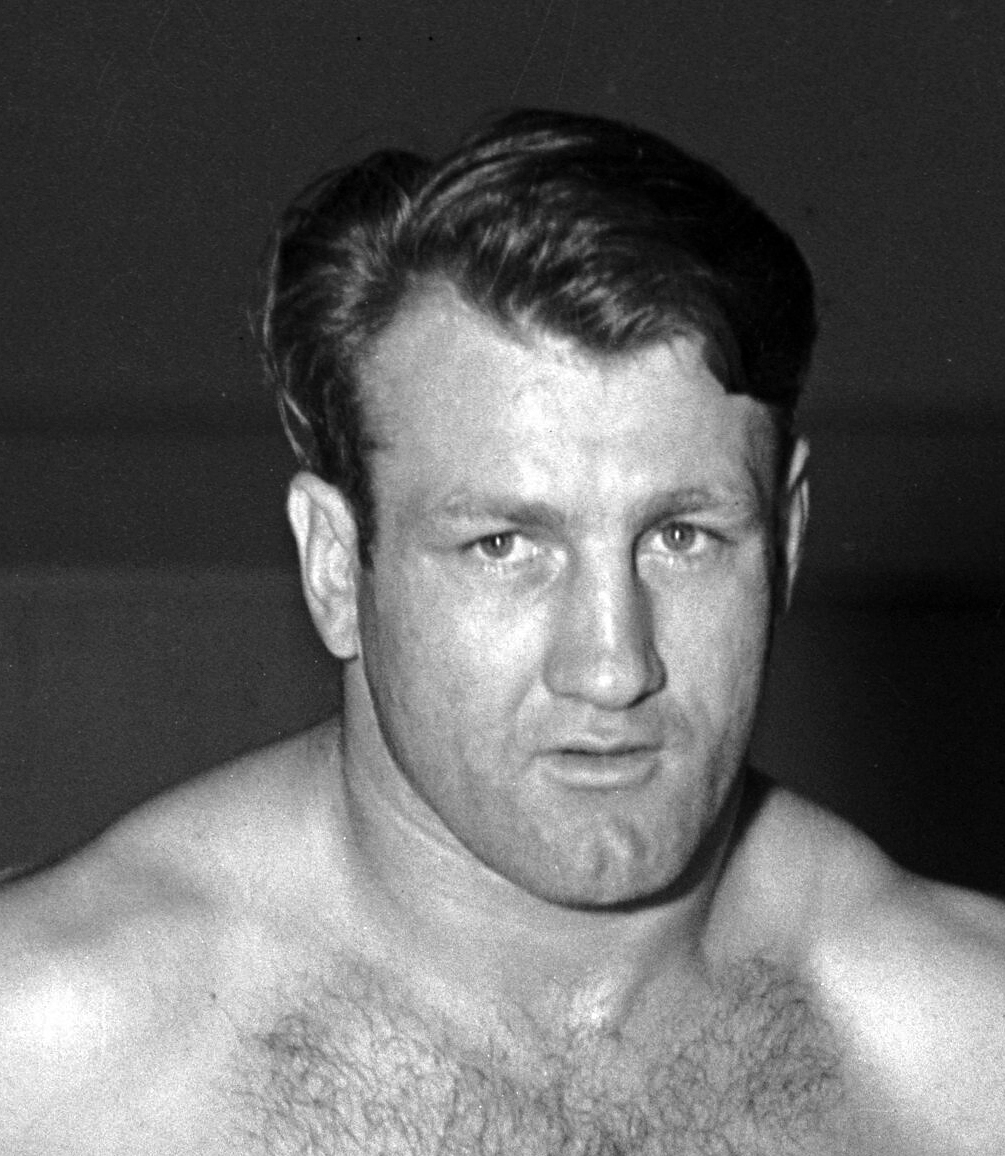
- Nagurski in 1937

No. 16, 3
- Positions: Fullback, tackle

Personal information
- Born: November 3, 1908; Rainy River, Ontario, Canada
- Died: January 7, 1990 (aged 81); International Falls, Minnesota, U.S.
- Listed height: 6 ft 2 in (1.88 m)
- Listed weight: 226 lb (103 kg)

Career information
- High school: Bemidji (Bemidji, Minnesota)
- College: Minnesota (1927–1929)

Career history

Playing
- Chicago Bears (1930–1937, 1943)

Coaching
- UCLA (1944) Backfield

Awards and highlights
- 3× NFL champion (1932, 1933, 1943); 4× First-team All-Pro (1932–1934, 1936); NFL rushing touchdowns leader (1932); NFL 1930s All-Decade Team; NFL 75th Anniversary All-Time Team; Chicago Bears No. 3 retired; 100 greatest Bears of All-Time; Consensus All-American (1929); First-team All-Big Ten (1929); First-team AP All-Time All-American (2025); Minnesota Golden Gophers No. 72 retired

Career statistics
- Games played: 97
- Games started: 75
- Rushing yards: 2,778
- Rushing average: 4.4
- Rushing touchdowns: 25
- Receptions: 11
- Receiving yards: 134
- Points scored: 154
- Stats at Pro Football Reference
- Pro Football Hall of Fame
- College Football Hall of Fame

Bronislau "Bronko" Nagurski (November 3, 1908 – January 7, 1990) was a Canadian-American professional football player who was a fullback and defensive tackle in the National Football League (NFL). Renowned for his strength and size, Nagurski was considered to be the most dangerous fullback of his era, and was also a successful professional wrestler, recognized as a multiple-time World Heavyweight Champion.

Nagurski became a college football standout playing both tackle on defense and fullback on offense for the Minnesota Golden Gophers from 1927 to 1929, selected a consensus All-American in 1929 and inducted into the College Football Hall of Fame in its inaugural year of 1951. His professional career with the Chicago Bears, which began in 1930 and ended on two occasions in 1937 and 1943, also made him an inaugural inductee into the Pro Football Hall of Fame in 1963.

== Early life ==
Nagurski was born in Rainy River, Ontario, to a family of Ukrainian and Polish descent. His parents, "Mike" and Michelina Nagurski, were immigrants from the Galicia region of eastern Europe. His family moved to International Falls, Minnesota when he was five years old. Nagurski grew up working on his parents' farm and sawmill, delivering groceries for his father's grocery store. In his teens, he labored at nearby timbering operations, growing into a powerfully muscular six-footer.

== College career ==
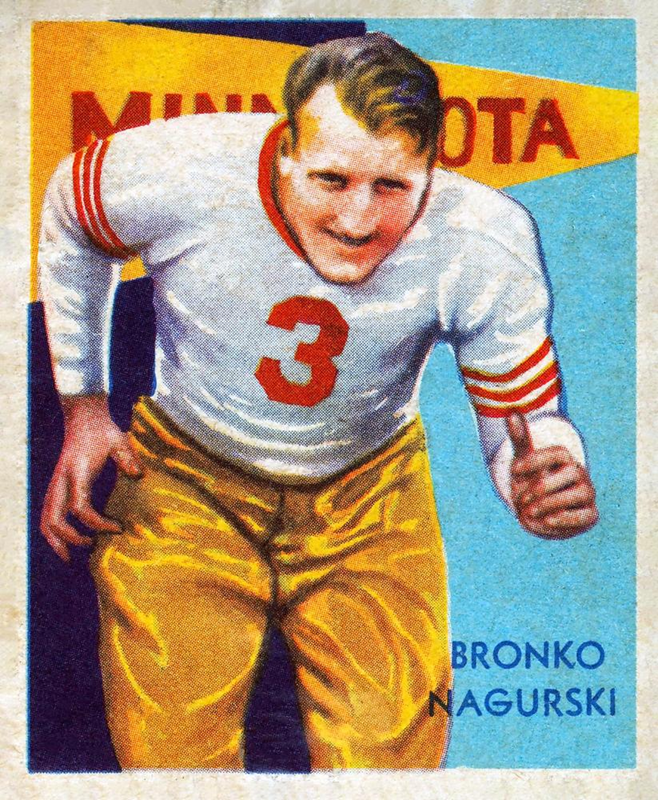
Nagurski on a 1935 National Chicle card during his time in Minnesota

Nagurski was discovered and signed by University of Minnesota head coach Clarence Spears, who had originally driven to International Falls to meet another player. On the outside of town, he watched Nagurski out plowing a field without assistance. According to legend, Spears asked him for directions, and Bronko lifted his plow and used it to point. He was signed on the spot to play for the Golden Gophers. Spears later admitted he concocted the story on his long drive back to the university in Minneapolis.

Legends aside, on his first day of practice Spears decided to test Nagurski in the "Nutcracker" drill, where a defensive player had to take on two blockers and try to tackle a following ball carrier. On the first drill, two All-Big Ten linemen and Herb Joesting charged at Bronko, who promptly split the blockers and drove the big fullback into a blocking dummy. Spears sent in three more players, blew his whistle, and watched Bronko produce the same explosive results. After a third try with the same conclusion, Spears realized what kind of a player he had recruited.

Nagurski became a standout, playing both tackle on defense and fullback on offense at Minnesota from 1927 to 1929. In 1929, after posting 737 rushing yards, he was a consensus All-American at fullback, and despite playing fewer games at the position also made some All-American teams at tackle. The pre-eminent sportswriter of the day, Grantland Rice, listed him at the two positions in picking his 1929 All-America team. Rice later wrote, "Who would you pick to win a football game: 11 Jim Thorpes, 11 Glen Davises, 11 Red Granges, or 11 Bronko Nagurskis? The 11 Nagurskis would be a mop-up. It would be something close to murder and massacre. For the Bronk could star at any position on the field, with 216 pounds (98 kg) of authority to back him up."

His greatest collegiate game was against Wisconsin in the season finale in 1928. Wearing a corset to protect cracked vertebrae, he recovered a Badger fumble deep in their territory, then ran the ball six straight times to score the go-ahead touchdown. Later in the same game, he intercepted a pass to seal the victory.

During his three varsity seasons at Minnesota, the Gophers went 18–4–2 (.792) and won the Big Ten Conference championship in 1927. Nagurski was inducted into the College Football Hall of Fame in 1951.

While at the University of Minnesota, Nagurski was a member of Sigma Chi fraternity, at the same time as another All-American, Herb Joesting.

In 1999, Sports Illustrated included him on its All-Century Team for college football.

== Professional career ==
=== Football ===
Nagurski turned professional to play for the Chicago Bears from 1930 to 1937. At 6 ft 2 in (1.88 m) and 235 pounds (107 kg), he was a formidable presence, and a dominant force, helping the Bears win several division titles and two NFL championships. He ended his eight-year stint with 3,947 rushing yards on 856 attempts, completed 36 of 80 passes, and scored a total of 236 points.

Nagurski had the largest recorded NFL Championship ring size at 19 1/2 and wore a size-8 helmet. He was probably the largest running back of his time, bigger than most linemen of the day, (Note: A forerunner to large fullbacks like Marion Motley, John Henry Johnson and Jim Brown) often dragging multiple tacklers with him. In a time when players were expected to play on both sides of the ball, he was a standout defensive lineman as well playing a ranging tackle or "The Monster." After an injury, instead of sitting on the bench, he would sometimes be put in as an offensive tackle. In a 1984 interview with Sports Illustrated writer Paul "Dr. Z" Zimmerman, when asked what position he would play if he were coming up in the present day, he said, "I would probably be a linebacker today. I wouldn't be carrying the ball 30 or 35 times a game."

An apocryphal story about Nagurski is a scoring gallop that he made against the Washington Redskins, knocking two linebackers in opposite directions, stomping a defensive back and crushing a safety, then bouncing off the goalposts and cracking Wrigley Field's brick wall. On returning to the huddle for the extra point try, he reportedly said: "That last guy hit me awfully hard."

Once in a game against the Packers, the Bears prepared to punt, and Green Bay's Cal Hubbard went to Red Grange and said: "I promise not to try to block the kick, Red, but get out of the way so I can get a shot at that Polack." Grange, glad not to try to block Hubbard for once, obliged. Cal tore through the line, slammed into Nagurski and bounced off. Rising slowly, he turned to Grange and said: "Hey, Red, don't do me any more favors."

At the end of the 1932 season, the Chicago Bears and the Portsmouth Spartans were tied with the best regular-season records. To determine the champion, the league voted to hold its first playoff game. Due to the cold weather, the game was held indoors at Chicago Stadium, which forced some temporary rule changes. Chicago won, 9–0. In the fourth quarter of the 1932 game, the Bears scored on a controversial touchdown: Carl Brumbaugh handed the ball off to fullback Nagurski, who pulled up and threw to Red Grange in the end zone for the score. The Spartans argued that Nagurski did not drop back five yards before passing to Grange, but the touchdown stood. The playoff proved so popular that the league reorganized into two divisions for the 1933 season, with the winners advancing to a scheduled championship game. A number of new rule changes were also instituted: the goal posts were moved forward to the goal line, every play started from between the hash marks, and forward passes could originate from anywhere behind the line of scrimmage (instead of the previous five yards behind).

In 1943, with the Bears losing so many players to World War II, Nagurski came out of retirement to play tackle. He remained at the position until he returned to fullback against the Chicago Cardinals, whom the Bears needed to defeat to advance to the 1943 NFL Championship Game; Nagurski scored a touchdown in the game as the Bears won 35–24. Chicago went on to win the 1943 title after beating the Washington Redskins 41–21, while Nagurski scored on a three-yard touchdown run in the second quarter.

He retired again after the 1943 season and became the backfield coach for the UCLA Bruins. After one year, he resigned from his position with the Bruins to return to farming.

=== Wrestling ===
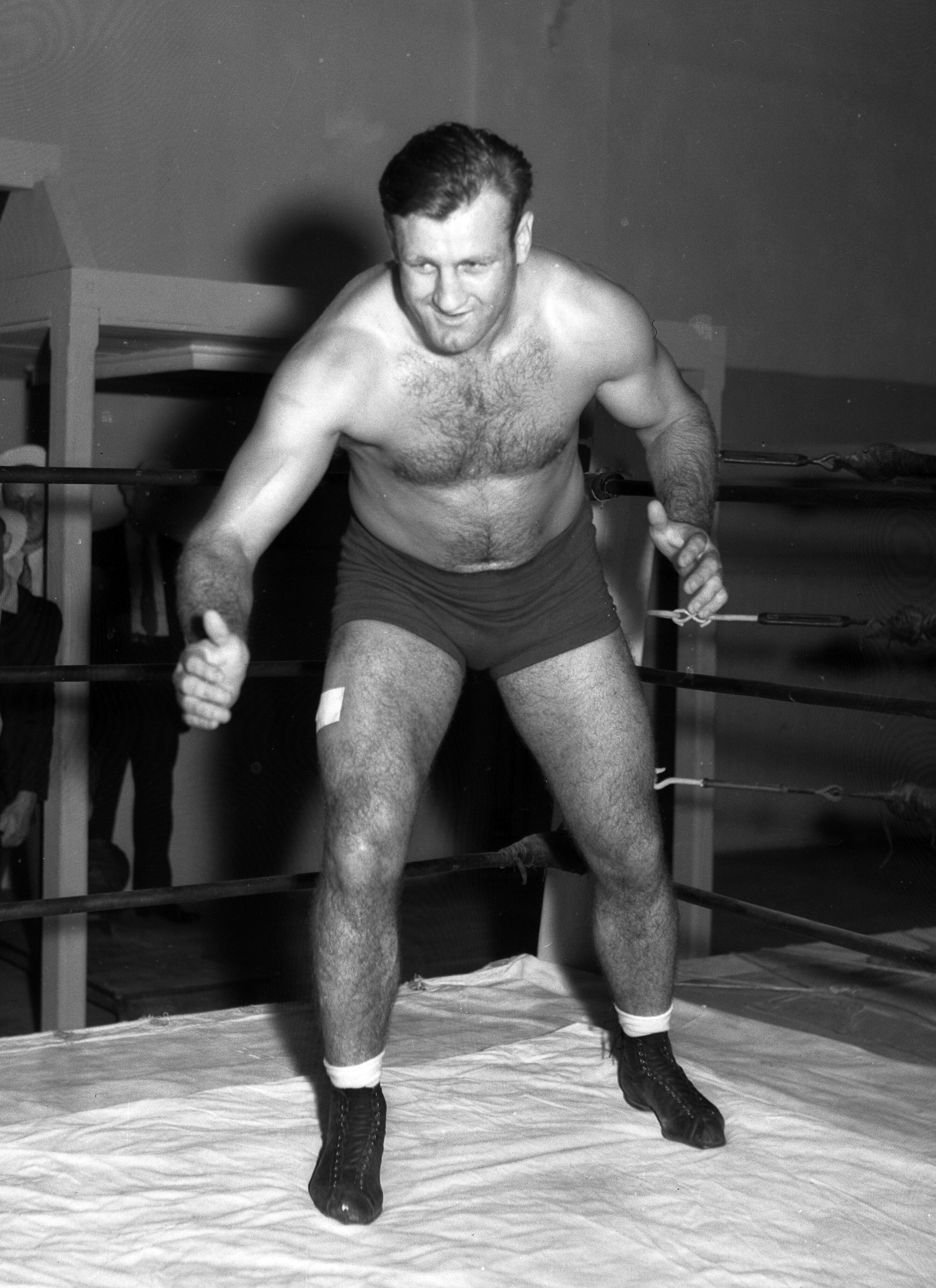
Nagurski posing in a wrestling ring, 1937

During his football career, he built a second athletic career as a professional wrestler and became a major box-office attraction. Tony Stecher, brother of former world champion Joe Stecher, introduced Nagurski to wrestling in 1933 and became his manager. Nagurski defeated Tag Tagerson in his ring debut. Hitting his peak in the late 1930s, Nagurski won a limited version of the world championship by defeating Dean Detton on June 29, 1937. But he finally achieved full recognition with his first National Wrestling Association world title by defeating Lou Thesz on June 23, 1939. Losing the title to Ray Steele on March 7, 1940, he regained it from Steele one year later on March 11, 1941, but lost it three months later to Sandor Szabo on June 5, 1941. Nagurski continued to wrestle until 1958.

== NFL career statistics ==
Legend
	Won NFL Championship
	Led the league
**Bold**	Career high

Year	Team	Games		Rushing						Receiving				
Year	Team	GP	GS	Att	Yds	Avg	Y/G	Lng	TD	Rec	Yds	Avg	Lng	TD
1930	CHI	13	13	–	–	–	–	–	5	–	–	–	–	–
1931	CHI	10	8	–	–	–	–	–	2	–	–	–	–	–
1932	CHI	**14**	**14**	121	533	4.4	38.1	–	4	**6**	**67**	11.2	–	0
1933	CHI	13	10	**128**	533	4.2	41.0	–	1	1	23	**23.0**	**23**	0
1934	CHI	13	11	123	**586**	4.8	45.1	–	**7**	3	32	10.7	–	0
1935	CHI	5	3	50	170	3.4	34.0	–	1	–	–	–	–	–
1936	CHI	11	8	122	529	4.3	**48.1**	–	3	1	12	12.0	12	0
1937	CHI	10	8	73	343	4.7	34.3	–	1	–	–	–	–	–
1943	CHI	8	0	16	84	**5.3**	10.5	11	1	–	–	–	–	–
Career		97	75	633	2,778	4.4	28.6	11	25	11	134	12.2	23	0

== Career highlights ==
NFL

- 3× NFL champion (1932, 1933, 1943)
- 4× First-team All-Pro (1932–1934, 1936)
- NFL rushing touchdowns leader (1932)
- NFL 1930s All-Decade Team
- NFL 75th Anniversary All-Time Team
- No. 19 on The Top 100: NFL's Greatest Players
- Chicago Bears No. 3 retired
- 100 greatest Bears of All-Time

College

- Consensus All-American (1929)
- First-team All-Big Ten (1929)
- First-team AP All-Time All-American (2025)
- Minnesota Golden Gophers No. 72 retired

Pro wrestling

- **California State Athletic Commission**
  - World Heavyweight Championship (Los Angeles version) (1 time)
- **George Tragos/Lou Thesz Professional Wrestling Hall of Fame**
  - Class of 2009
- **National Wrestling Association**
  - NWA/NBA World Heavyweight Championship (2 times)
- **New York State Athletic Commission**
  - New York State Athletic Commission World Heavyweight Championship (1 time)
- **Minneapolis Wrestling and Boxing Club**
  - World Heavyweight Championship (Minneapolis version) (2 times)
  - NWA World Tag Team Championship (Minneapolis version) (2 times) – with Verne Gagne (1) and Ilio DiPaolo (1)
- **NWA San Francisco**
  - NWA Pacific Coast Heavyweight Championship (San Francisco version) (2 times)
- **Professional Wrestling Hall of Fame and Museum**
  - (Class of 2011)
- **Wrestling Observer Newsletter**
  - Wrestling Observer Newsletter Hall of Fame (Class of 1996)
- **Other titles**
  - World Heavyweight Championship (original version) (1 time)

== Personal life ==
Nagurski married his childhood sweetheart, Eileen Kane, on December 28, 1936. The couple had six children: sons Bronko Jr., Tony, Ronald and Kevin, and daughters Eugenia and Janice. Bronko Jr. was born on Christmas Day 1937, played football at the University of Notre Dame, and became an all-star with the Hamilton Tiger-Cats of the Canadian Football League.

He was naturalized as a United States citizen in December 1938.

== Later life and legacy ==
In early February 1944, Nagurski was summoned by the United States Army for service. The United Press remarked "Gen. Dwight D. Eisenhower can stop worrying" if Nagurski were to join as "the general will have a one-man army on his team," while the Army should "just armor-plate him—call his number—and follow him to Berlin." After a three-day physical examination at Fort Snelling, the Army ruled him medically unfit due to injuries sustained during his football career.

Following his retirement from wrestling, he returned home to International Falls and opened a service station. A local legend claims that Nagurski had the best repeat business in town because he would screw customers' gas caps on so tightly after filling their tanks that no one else in town could unscrew them. He retired from that in 1978, at the age of seventy, and lived out a quiet life on the shores of Rainy Lake on the Canada–U.S. border.

Nagurski performed the coin toss for Super Bowl XVIII in Tampa, Florida, in 1984. Washington Redskins quarterback and co-captain Joe Theismann called the toss on behalf of his team's co-captains and the captains of the opposing Los Angeles Raiders.

On January 7, 1990, Nagurski died of cardiac arrest in International Falls, Minnesota, and is buried at its Forest Hill Cemetery. Bronko Nagurski was 81 years old.

=== Honors ===
Nagurski was elected to the Pro Football Hall of Fame as a charter member on September 7, 1963. He was also inducted into the National High School Hall of Fame in 1989. At the University of Minnesota house of his fraternity, Sigma Chi, Nagurski's jersey and Significant Sig recognition certificate are on display. After his death, the town of International Falls honored him by opening the Bronko Nagurski Museum in Smokey Bear Park.

Sports Illustrated named Nagurski one of the four greatest athletes in Minnesota state history; the other three were Dave Winfield, Kevin McHale, and Joe Mauer. In 1993, the Football Writers Association of America created the Bronko Nagurski Trophy, awarded annually to the best defensive player in college football. Notable winners include Warren Sapp, Charles Woodson, Terrell Suggs, Champ Bailey and Derrick Johnson. In 1999 Nagurski was selected by Sports Illustrated as a starting defensive tackle for their "NCAA Football All-Century Team". The other starting defensive tackle on that list was Rich Glover. In 2007, Nagurski was ranked No. 17 on ESPN's Top 25 Players In College Football History list.

In 1999, he was ranked No. 35 on The Sporting News' list of the 100 Greatest Football Players, the highest-ranking foreign-born player. In 2000, he was voted the second-greatest Minnesotan sportsman of the 20th century by the sportswriters of the Star Tribune, coming in behind only Minnesota Twins Hall of Famer Kirby Puckett.

A fictionalized eyewitness account of Nagurski's 1943 comeback is the subject of a dramatic monologue in the 2001 film version of Hearts in Atlantis. The film's screenwriter, William Goldman, repeated much of this rendition from his earlier account of the same story in his novel Magic.

In 2002, he was ranked 90 out of 100 wrestlers for Dave Meltzer's Top 100 Wrestlers of All Time.

In 2009, Nagurski was an honorary team captain, represented by his son, Bronko Nagurski Jr., at the opening game of TCF Bank Stadium. His home town's International Falls high school is nicknamed the Broncos in his honor.

In September 2021, he was inducted into the National Polish-American Hall of Fame, housed in Troy, Michigan.

== See also ==
- List of Canadian sports personalities
- List of gridiron football players who became professional wrestlers
