= Elmer Sleight =

American football player (1907–1978)

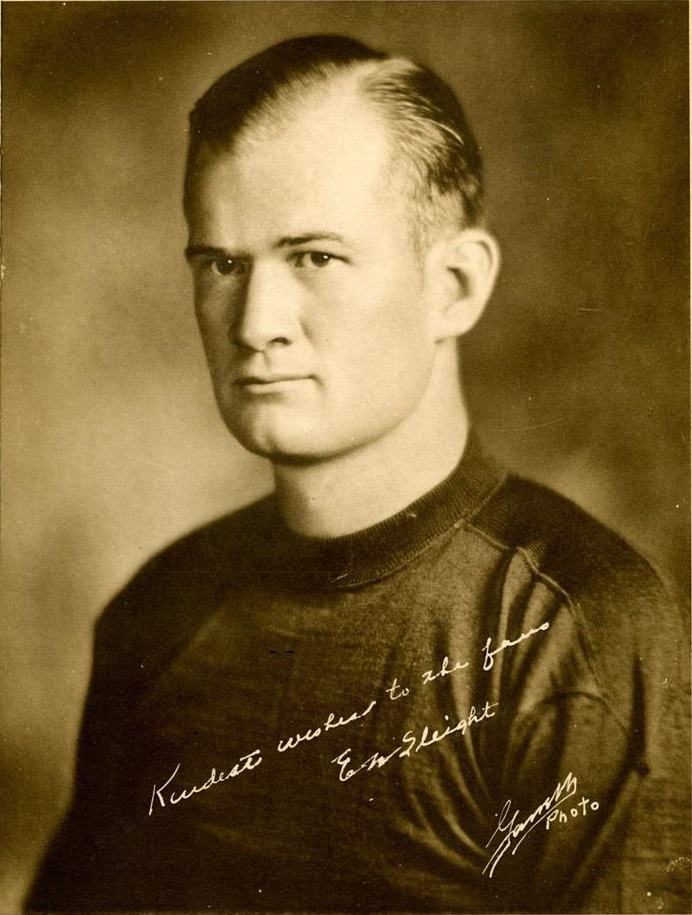

No. 34, 37
- Position: Tackle

Personal information
- Born: July 8, 1907; Sisseton, South Dakota, U.S.
- Died: August 9, 1978 (aged 71); Naples, Florida, U.S.
- Listed height: 6 ft 2 in (1.88 m)
- Listed weight: 226 lb (103 kg)

Career information
- College: Purdue

Career history
- Green Bay Packers (1930–1931)

Awards and highlights
- 2× NFL champion (1930–1931); Consensus All-American (1929); First-team All-Big Ten (1929)

Career NFL statistics
- Games played: 26
- Stats at Pro Football Reference

Elmer Noble "Red" Sleight (1907 - August 9, 1978) was an All-American football player.

Sleight was born in 1907 in Morris, Illinois, and attended Morris High School.

He played at the tackle position for the Purdue University Boilermakers from 1927 to 1929. He was a consensus first-team player on the 1929 All-America college football team, receiving first-team honors from the Associated Press, Collier's Weekly, International News Service an All-America Board. He also received the Western Conference medal for proficiency in scholarship and athletics and was one of 11 All-American football players to appear in the 1930 film "Maybe It's Love".

He played professionally for the Green Bay Packers in 1930 and 1931. He appeared in 26 NFL games for the Packers, 19 of them as a starter.

After his playing career ended, Sleight held assistant coaching positions at Missouri and then Lehigh. He later went into marketing in Chicago. He moved to Naples, Florida, after retiring. He died in Naples in 1978 at age 71.
