= 1929 All-Big Ten Conference football team =

American college football all-star team

The 1929 All-Big Ten Conference football team consists of American football players selected to the All-Big Ten Conference teams chosen by various selectors for the 1929 Big Ten Conference football season.

== All Big-Ten selections ==
=== Ends ===
- Wes Fesler, Ohio State (AP-1; NEA-1; UP-1; WE-1)
- Bob Tanner, Minnesota (AP-1; NEA-1; UP-1; WE-1)
- Frank Baker, Northwestern (NEA-2; UP-3; WE-2)
- Milt Gantenbein, Wisconsin (NEA-2; UP-3)
- Joe Truskowski, Michigan (UP-2)
- Wilbert O. Catterton, Indiana (UP-2)
- Arnold E. Wolgast, Illinois (WE-2)

=== Tackles ===
- Bronko Nagurski, Minnesota (AP-1; NEA-1; UP-1; WE-1)
- Elmer Sleight, Purdue (AP-1; NEA-2; UP-1; WE-1)
- Lou Gordon, Illinois (NEA-1; UP-2)
- Unger, Indiana (UP-2)
- Jack Riley, Northwestern (WE-2)
- Peter Westra, Iowa (NEA-1; WE-2)
- Milo Lubratovich, Wisconsin (UP-3)
- George Van Bibber, Purdue (NEA-2; UP-3)

=== Guards ===
- Fred Roberts, Iowa (AP-1; UP-1; WE-2)
- Henry J. Anderson, Northwestern (AP-1; NEA-1 [tackle]; UP-2; WE-1)
- John Parks, Wisconsin (UP-1)
- Russ Crane, Illinois (UP-2; WE-1)
- Howard W. Poe, Michigan (NEA-2)
- Sam T. Selby, Ohio State (NEA-2)
- George Stears, Purdue (WE-2)
- Denny Myers, Iowa (UP-3)
- Alfred E. Steinke, Michigan (UP-3)

=== Centers ===
- Mickey Erickson, Northwestern (AP-1; UP-1; WE-2)
- Alan Bovard, Michigan (NEA-1; WE-1)
- Ed Kawal, Illinois (NEA-2; UP-2)
- Buck Weaver, Chicago (UP-3)

=== Quarterbacks ===
- Glen Harmeson, Purdue (AP-1; NEA-1 [hb]; UP-1; WE-1)
- Frosty Peters, Illinois (NEA-1)
- Alan M. Holman, Ohio State (UP-2; WE-2)
- Win Brockmeyer, Minnesota (UP-3)

=== Halfbacks ===
- Willis Glassgow, Iowa (AP-1; NEA-1; UP-1; WE-1)
- Ralph Welch, Purdue (AP-1; NEA-1 [fb]; UP-1; WE-1)
- Oran Pape, Iowa (NEA-2; UP-2)
- Art Pharmer, Minnesota (NEA-2 [hb]; UP-2)
- Frank H. Walker, Illinois (WE-2)
- Errett Van Nice, Chicago (NEA-2)
- Jud Timm, Illinois (UP-3)
- George O. Ross, Indiana (UP-3)

=== Fullbacks ===
- Russell Bergherm, Northwestern (AP-1; NEA-2; UP-1; WE-1)
- Joe Gembis, Michigan (UP-2; WE-2 [hb])
- Alex Yunevich, Purdue (WE-2)
- Harold Rebholz, Wisconsin (UP-3)

== Key ==
AP = Associated Press "selected with the aid of nine conference coaches"

NEA = Newspaper Enterprise Association selected by William Bracher, sports expert for NEA

UP = United Press, based on consultations with coaches and football experts and "the consensus of its own men who have been covering games all season"

WE = Walter Eckersall of the Chicago Tribune; his 1929 selections were his last, as he died of a heart attack in March 1930 at age 43

Bold = Consensus first-team selection of at least two of the listed selectors (AP, NEA, UP and Eckersall)

== See also ==
- 1929 College Football All-America Team
