= Alan Bovard =

American football player and coach (1906–1983)

- Bovard cropped from 1929 Michigan football team photograph

Biographical details
- Born: September 24, 1906; Pittsburgh, Pennsylvania, U.S.
- Died: July 11, 1983 (aged 76); Marquette, Michigan, U.S.

Playing career

Football
- 1926–1929: Michigan
- Position: Center

Coaching career (HC unless noted)

Football
- 1930: Michigan (assistant)
- ?: J. W. Sexton HS (MI)
- 1947–1956: Michigan Tech

Basketball
- ?: J. W. Sexton HS (MI)
- 1947–1949: Michigan Tech

Administrative career (AD unless noted)
- 1947–1972: Michigan Tech

Head coaching record
- Overall: 39–29–3 (college football); 18–15 (college basketball)

Accomplishments and honors

Awards
- First-team All-Big Ten (1929)

Alan J. Bovard (September 24, 1906 – July 11, 1983) was an American football player and coach. He was an All-Big Ten Conference center at the University of Michigan in 1929. He later served as the athletic director at Michigan Technological University from 1947 to 1972 and the head football coach from 1947 to 1956.

== Athlete ==
Bovard was born in Pittsburgh, Pennsylvania, and grew up in Ithaca, New York. He enrolled at the University of Michigan in 1926 and played at the center position for the Michigan Wolverines football teams from 1926 to 1929. As a senior in 1929, he was selected as an All-Big Ten Conference player.

== High school coach ==
Bovard graduated from Michigan in 1930 and served as an assistant football coach under Harry Kipke for the 1930 Michigan Wolverines football team. He was employed as a high school football and basketball coach from 1931 to 1947. He coached Lansing's J. W. Sexton High School basketball team to Michigan's Class A championship in the 1944–45 season and also coached the school's football team to the state Class A championship in 1946.

== Michigan Tech ==
In January 1947, Bovard was hired as the athletic director, head football coach and head of the physical education department at Michigan Technological University. He served as the football coach from 1947 to 1956. In 1948, Bovard led the Michigan Tech Huskies football team to its first undefeated season, finishing the season with a 7–0 record and outscoring opponents 209 to 58. He served as athletic director for 25 years and expanded Michigan Tech's athletic program into eleven varsity and seventeen intramural programs. Bovard also served as the school's head basketball coach for two years, compiling a record of 19 wins and 14 losses.

In October 1972, Bovard announced his retirement from Michigan Tech, effective December 31, 1972.

== Death and Hall of Fame inductions ==
In July 1983, Bovard died in Marquette, Michigan, where he had been hospitalized for several weeks.

Bovard was inducted into the Upper Peninsula Hall of Fame in 1976 and the Michigan Tech Hall of Fame in 1985.

== Head coaching record ==
=== College football ===
Record table
Season	Team	Overall	Conference	Standing	Postseason
Michigan Tech Huskies (Independent) (1947–1956)
1947	Michigan Tech	3–3–1			
1948	Michigan Tech	7–0			
1949	Michigan Tech	4–3			
1950	Michigan Tech	4–3–1			
1951	Michigan Tech	4–2–1			
1952	Michigan Tech	6–1			
1953	Michigan Tech	2–5			
1954	Michigan Tech	3–4			
1955	Michigan Tech	4–3			
1956	Michigan Tech	2–5			
Michigan Tech:		39–29–3			
Total:		39–29–3			
