= 1929 VPI Gobblers football team =

American college football season

1929 VPI Gobblers football
- Conference: Southern Conference
- Record: 5–4 (2–3 SoCon)
- Head coach: Andy Gustafson (4th season)
- Captains: Henry Virgil Hooper; Lloyd Broderick Nutter
- Home stadium: Miles Stadium

1929 Southern Conference football standings
	Conf.					Overall
Team	W		L		T	W		L		T
No. 10 Tulane $	6	–	0	–	0	9	–	0	–	0
Tennessee	6	–	0	–	1	9	–	0	–	1
North Carolina	7	–	1	–	0	9	–	1	–	0
Florida	6	–	1	–	0	8	–	2	–	0
Vanderbilt	5	–	1	–	0	7	–	2	–	0
Kentucky	3	–	1	–	1	6	–	1	–	1
Georgia	4	–	2	–	0	6	–	4	–	0
VMI	4	–	2	–	0	8	–	2	–	0
Duke	2	–	1	–	0	4	–	6	–	0
LSU	3	–	2	–	0	6	–	3	–	0
Alabama	4	–	3	–	0	6	–	3	–	0
Clemson	3	–	3	–	0	8	–	3	–	0
VPI	2	–	3	–	0	5	–	4	–	0
Georgia Tech	3	–	5	–	0	3	–	6	–	0
South Carolina	2	–	5	–	0	6	–	5	–	0
Virginia	1	–	3	–	2	4	–	3	–	2
Maryland	1	–	3	–	1	4	–	4	–	2
Washington and Lee	1	–	4	–	1	3	–	5	–	1
Ole Miss	0	–	4	–	2	1	–	6	–	2
Mississippi A&M	0	–	3	–	1	1	–	5	–	2
Sewanee	0	–	4	–	1	2	–	5	–	2
NC State	0	–	5	–	0	1	–	8	–	0
Auburn	0	–	7	–	0	2	–	7	–	0
$ – Conference champion; Rankings from Dickinson System

The 1929 VPI Gobblers football team represented Virginia Polytechnic Institute in the 1929 college football season. The team was led by their head coach Andy Gustafson and finished with a record of five wins and four losses (5–4).

== Schedule ==
Date	Time	Opponent	Site	Result	Attendance	Source
September 28		Roanoke*	Miles Stadium; Blacksburg, VA	W 19–0		
October 5		Hampden–Sydney*	Miles Stadium; Blacksburg, VA	W 37–6		
October 12	2:30 p.m.	at Penn*	Franklin Field; Philadelphia, PA	L 8–14	30,000	
October 19		vs. William & Mary*	City Stadium; Richmond, VA	W 25–14	12,000	
October 26		at North Carolina	Kenan Memorial Stadium; Chapel Hill, NC	L 13–38	8,000	
November 2		vs. Washington and Lee	Municipal Stadium; Lynchburg, VA	W 36–6	7,000-10,000+	
November 9	2:30 p.m.	at Virginia	Lambeth Field; Charlottesville, VA (rivalry)	W 32–12		
November 16		vs. Maryland	League Park; Norfolk, VA	L 0–24		
November 28		vs. VMI	Maher Field; Roanoke, VA (rivalry)	L 0–14	22,000	
*Non-conference game; All times are in Eastern time

== Before the season ==
The 1928 VPI Gobblers football team compiled a 7–2 record and were led by Andy Gustafson in his third season as head coach.

== Game summaries ==
=== Roanoke ===
Roanoke vs. VPI

Team	1	2	3	4	Total
Roanoke	0	0	0	0	0
• VPI	6	7	0	6	19

- Date: September 28, 1929
- Location: Miles Stadium
  Blacksburg, VA
- Game weather: "A hot, oppressive sun"
- Referee: Paul Magoffin

VPI's first game of the season was a victory over Roanoke at Miles Stadium.

The starting lineup for VPI was: Nutter (left end), Swart (left tackle), Gray (left guard), Wimmer (center), Dexter Hubbard (right guard), Stark (right tackle), Pattie (right end), Hooper (quarterback), McEver (left halfback), Spear (right halfback), Owens (fullback). The substitutes were: Brown, Chandler, Chrisman, Davis, Gardner, Hardwick, Maury Hubbard, Ottley, Pendleton, Rice, Rule, Shannon and Tomko.

The starting lineup for Roanoke was: F. M. "Cal" Ritter (left end), S. W. "Pete" Lavinder (left tackle), A. W. Caughman (left guard), W. T. "Ted" Fix (center), R. L. Abbott (right guard), Lloyd "Buzzy" Goode (right tackle), R. M. McPherson (right end), Ed I. Bell (quarterback), Billy O. Williams (left halfback), S. C. Rutherford (right halfback), Roy Boyle (fullback). The substitutes were: P. E. Ahalt, E. L. Cruise, R. B. Farley, J. L. Harne, Henson, F. W. Trimmer and Zirkle.

=== Hampden–Sydney ===
Hampden–Sydney vs. VPI

Team	1	2	3	4	Total
HS	0	0	0	6	6
• VPI	12	13	6	6	37

- Date: October 5, 1929
- Location: Miles Stadium
  Blacksburg, VA
- Referee: Parrish (VPI)

After their victory over Roanoke, VPI played Hampden–Sydney College at Miles Stadium.

The starting lineup for VPI was: Nutter (left end), Swart (left tackle), Gray (left guard), Wimmer (center), Dexter Hubbard (right guard), Stark (right tackle), Pattie (right end), Hooper (quarterback), Tomko (left halfback), Spear (right halfback), McEver (fullback). The substitutes were: Brown, Chandler, Christman, Davis, Gardner, Haggerty, Hardwick, Maury Hubbard, Hughes, Ottley, Owens, Rice and Shannon.

The starting lineup for Hampden–Sydney was: Ellis Allen (left end), John Nance (left tackle), George Hughes (left guard), Frances Lineweaver (center), Roy Hogan (right guard), Benjamin Franklin (right tackle), Robert Lawson (right end), Ralph Willis (quarterback), Raymond McCann (left halfback), Charles Garden (right halfback), John Ruffner (fullback). The substitutes were: Carl Arehart, Hugh Blanton, Joseph Bradford, Andrew Ingles, Henry McLaughlin, Hugh Powell, Wellford Reed and George Woodworth.

=== Pennsylvania ===
VPI at Pennsylvania

Team	1	2	3	4	Total
VPI	0	2	6	0	8
• Penn	7	0	7	0	14

- Date: October 12, 1929
- Location: Franklin Field
  Philadelphia, PA
- Game start: 2:30 p.m.
- Game attendance: 30,000
- Referee: E.C. Taggart (Rochester)

The starting lineup for VPI was: Nutter (left end), Stark (left tackle), Gray (left guard), Wimmer (center), Dexter Hubbard (right guard), Swart (right tackle), Pattie (right end), Hooper (quarterback), Tomko (left halfback), Spear (right halfback), Owens (fullback).

The starting lineup for Pennsylvania was: Sydney Gervin (left end), John Utz (left tackle), Barrett (left guard), Joseph Olexy (center), Walter Magai (right guard), Curtis Morris (right tackle), Paul Riblett (right end), Morton Wilner (quarterback), Walt Masters (left halfback), Wally Opekun (right halfback), Richard Gentle (fullback). The substitutes were: Alfred Ratowsky.

=== William & Mary ===
William & Mary vs. VPI

Team	1	2	3	4	Total
W&M	7	7	0	0	14
• VPI	6	7	0	12	25

- Date: October 19, 1929
- Location: City Stadium
  Richmond, VA
- Game attendance: 12,000
- Referee: Paul Magoffin

The starting lineup for VPI was: Nutter (left end), Stark (left tackle), Jones (left guard), Wimmer (center), Dexter Hubbard (right guard), Swart (right tackle), Pattie (right end), Hooper (quarterback), Tomko (left halfback), Spear (right halfback), Owens (fullback). The substitutes were: Brown, Green, Ritter and Rule.

The starting lineup for William & Mary was: J. Bauserman (left end), James Murphy (left tackle), Crawford Syer (left guard), Fields (center), Otis Douglas (right guard), Benton (right tackle), Willis (right end), Ryan (quarterback), William Scott (left halfback), Paul Baldacci (right halfback), Butch Constantino (fullback). The substitutes were: R. D. Bauserman, T. Bauserman, Darden, Diggs, William Koufman and Clarence Maxey.

=== North Carolina ===
VPI at North Carolina

Team	1	2	3	4	Total
VPI	0	0	6	7	13
• UNC	0	26	6	6	38

- Date: October 26, 1929
- Location: Kenan Memorial Stadium
  Chapel Hill, NC
- Game attendance: 8,000
- Referee: Lambert (Ohio State)

The starting lineup for VPI was: Nutter (left end), Stark (left tackle), Hubbard (left guard), Brown (center), Gray (right guard), Swart (right tackle), Pattie (right end), Hooper (quarterback), Spear (left halfback), Tomko (right halfback), Owens (fullback). The substitutes were: McEver, Rice, Ritter and Rule.

The starting lineup for North Carolina was: Don Holt (left end), Dortch (left tackle), Ray Farris (left guard), Edward Lipscomb (center), Eskew (right guard), Pot Adkins (right tackle), Robert Parsley (right end), Wyrick (quarterback), James Ward (left halfback), Edward Nash (right halfback), Leon Spaulding (fullback). The substitutes were: John Branch, Brown, Charles Erickson, Harden, Henry House, James Magner and Rip Slusser.

=== Washington and Lee ===
Washington & Lee vs. VPI

Team	1	2	3	4	Total
W&L	0	0	0	6	6
• VPI	18	6	0	12	36

- Date: November 2, 1929
- Location: Municipal Stadium
  Lynchburg, VA
- Game attendance: 7,000-10,000+

The starting lineup for VPI was: Nutter (left end), Ritter (left tackle), Hubbard (left guard), Brown (center), Gray (right guard), Swart (right tackle), Pattie (right end), Hooper (quarterback), Spear (left halfback), Tomko (right halfback), Owens (fullback). The substitutes were: McEver, Rice and Rule.

The starting lineup for Washington & Lee was: Leigh Williams (left end), D. S. Hostetter (left tackle), Jerry Holstein (left guard), H. Groop (center), Myer Seligman (right guard), William Hawkins (right tackle), Page Bledsoe (right end), W. W. Mattox (quarterback), John Faulkner (left halfback), Morton Thibodeau (right halfback), P. Mitchell (fullback). The substitutes were: A. C. Jones, Martin and W. Rosenberg.

=== Virginia ===
VPI at Virginia

Team	1	2	3	4	Total
• VPI	0	19	0	13	32
UVA	12	0	0	0	12

- Date: November 9, 1929
- Location: Lambeth Field
  Charlottesville, VA
- Game start: 2:30 p.m.
- Referee: Lane (Dartmouth)

The starting lineup for VPI was: Nutter (left end), Swart (left tackle), Gray (left guard), Wimmer (center), Dexter Hubbard (right guard), Stark (right tackle), Pattie (right end), Hooper (quarterback), Tomko (left halfback), Spear (right halfback), McEver (fullback). The substitutes were: Brown, Chandler, Dyke, Green, Haggerty, Harding, Maury Hubbard, Owens, Rice, Ritter, Rule and Shannon.

The starting lineup for Virginia was: Dick Turner (left end), Dick Day (left tackle), Ivey (left guard), George Taylor (center), Church Dunn (right guard), Bill Williams (right tackle), Bill Byrd (right end), Hunter Faulconer (quarterback), William Thomas (left halfback), Herbert Bryant (right halfback), Albert Lewy (fullback). The substitutes were: Richard DeButts, Fenton Gentry, Goldenburg, Lankford, Lee, Norwood Orrick, John Peyton, Frank Sippley and John Sloan.

=== Maryland ===
Maryland vs. VPI

Team	1	2	3	4	Total
• Maryland	14	0	3	7	24
VPI	0	0	0	0	0

- Date: November 16, 1929
- Location: League Park
  Norfolk, VA
- Referee: Paul Magoffin

The starting lineup for VPI was: Nutter (left end), Ritter (left tackle), Gray (left guard), Brown (center), Dexter Hubbard (right guard), Green (right tackle), Pattie (right end), Hooper (quarterback), Spear (left halfback), Tomko (right halfback), McEver (fullback). The substitutes were: Chandler, Dyke, Jones, Ottley, Owens, Rice, Rule, Stark and Wimmer.

The starting lineup for Maryland was: Alfred Pease (left end), Herman Lombard (left tackle), William Heintz (left guard), George Madigan (center), Jesse Krajcovic (right guard), Ernie Carliss (right tackle), Al Heagy (right end), William W. Evans (quarterback), Miller (left halfback), George V. Chalmers (right halfback), Julius J. Radice (fullback). The substitutes were: Parker Faber, William Fisher, May, John McDonald, Jack Norris, Frederick Ribnitzki and Roberts.

=== VMI ===
VMI vs. VPI

Team	1	2	3	4	Total
• VMI	7	0	0	7	14
VPI	0	0	0	0	0

- Date: November 28, 1929
- Location: Maher Field
  Roanoke, VA
- Game attendance: 22,000
- Game weather: "stiff southwest wind", "cold"
- Referee: E. F. Houghitt (Michigan)

The starting lineup for VPI was: Nutter (left end), Swart (left tackle), Gray (left guard), Brown (center), Jones (right guard), Green (right tackle), Pattie (right end), Hooper (quarterback), Tomko (left halfback), Spear (right halfback), McEver (fullback). The substitutes were: Maury Hubbard, Owens, Rice, Ritter, Rule, Stark and Wimmer.

The starting lineup for VMI was: Joel Moody (left end), Louis Chadwick (left tackle), William Haase (left guard), Virgil Grow (center), Philip Willard (right guard), Benjamin Smith (right tackle), Tommy Scott (right end), Albert Hawkins (quarterback), John Biggs (left halfback), Bernard McCray (right halfback), Roy Dunn (fullback). The substitutes were: Basil Gravatt, Aubrey Grow and Charles Holtzclaw.

== After the season ==
On January 31, 1930, Gustafson resigned as the head coach to become the head backfield coach at the University of Pittsburgh, his alma mater.

== Players ==
=== Roster ===
VPI 1929 roster
Roger Lee Amole; Charles Eugene Brown; Edwin F. Chandler; Charles H. Chrisman; William Grundy Davis; Earl E. Dyke; William Clarence Gardner; John Gray; John Green; Cushman Caldwell Hagerty; Harding; Samuel Elkana Hardwick; Henry Virgil "Bird" Hooper (Capt.); Dexter Hubbard; Maury Albon Hubbard; Douglas Turner Hughes	Warner Jones; Herbert McEver; Lloyd Nutter (Capt.); Waightes Gibbs Ottley; Milton Owens; Walter Pattie; E. W. Pendleton; J. Rice; Marcus Ritter; Eugene Rule; Charles Richard Shannon; Philip Spear; Harry Stark; James L. Swart; Tommy Tomko; Harold Wimmer

=== Monogram Club members ===
Eighteen players received monograms for their participation on the 1929 VPI team.

Player	Hometown	Notes
Charles Eugene "Dolly" Brown	Portsmouth, Virginia	
John Edward Gray	Newport News, Virginia	
John Buckner Green	Culpeper, Virginia	World War II veteran (Tec 5, Army).
Henry Virgil "Bird" Hooper	Newport News, Virginia	
Louis Dexter Hubbard	Forest, Virginia	World War II veteran (Lieutenant Colonel, Army).
Warner Brooke Jones	Gloucester, Virginia	
Herbert McEver	Bristol, Virginia	VPI's head football coach in 1942 and 1945, compiling a record of 9–8–1.
Lloyd Broderick Nutter	Blacksburg, Virginia	World War II veteran (Captain, Army).
Milton Anthony Owens	Portsmouth, Virginia	
Walter Wilson Pattie	Waynesboro, Virginia	
J. Rice	Roanoke, Virginia	
Marcus Oliver Ritter	Winchester, Virginia	
Eugene Butler Rule	Jodie, West Virginia	
Philip Hitchborn Spear	Portsmouth, Virginia	
Harry Hyman Stark	Portsmouth, Virginia	
James L. Swart		
Cyril Method "Tommy" Tomko	Disputanta, Virginia	
Harold Jefferson Wimmer	Roanoke, Virginia	

== Coaching and training staff ==
- Head coach: Andy Gustafson
- Assistant coach: N. Lee Frank
- Freshman head coach: Henry Redd
- Freshman assistant coaches
  - A. F. Bailey
  - P. Hotchkiss
- Freshman Manager: I. M. McGhee
