= Byrd Field =

Byrd Field may refer to:

- Byrd Field, the name of Old Byrd Stadium, the playing field for the University of Maryland from 1923 until 1947.
- Byrd Field, an earlier name for Richmond International Airport.
