= 1929 Virginia Cavaliers football team =

American college football season

1929 Virginia Cavaliers football
- Conference: Southern Conference
- Record: 4–3–2 (1–3–2 SoCon)
- Head coach: Earl Abell (1st season)
- Home stadium: Lambeth Field

1929 Southern Conference football standings
	Conf.					Overall
Team	W		L		T	W		L		T
No. 10 Tulane $	6	–	0	–	0	9	–	0	–	0
Tennessee	6	–	0	–	1	9	–	0	–	1
North Carolina	7	–	1	–	0	9	–	1	–	0
Florida	6	–	1	–	0	8	–	2	–	0
Vanderbilt	5	–	1	–	0	7	–	2	–	0
Kentucky	3	–	1	–	1	6	–	1	–	1
Georgia	4	–	2	–	0	6	–	4	–	0
VMI	4	–	2	–	0	8	–	2	–	0
Duke	2	–	1	–	0	4	–	6	–	0
LSU	3	–	2	–	0	6	–	3	–	0
Alabama	4	–	3	–	0	6	–	3	–	0
Clemson	3	–	3	–	0	8	–	3	–	0
VPI	2	–	3	–	0	5	–	4	–	0
Georgia Tech	3	–	5	–	0	3	–	6	–	0
South Carolina	2	–	5	–	0	6	–	5	–	0
Virginia	1	–	3	–	2	4	–	3	–	2
Maryland	1	–	3	–	1	4	–	4	–	2
Washington and Lee	1	–	4	–	1	3	–	5	–	1
Ole Miss	0	–	4	–	2	1	–	6	–	2
Mississippi A&M	0	–	3	–	1	1	–	5	–	2
Sewanee	0	–	4	–	1	2	–	5	–	2
NC State	0	–	5	–	0	1	–	8	–	0
Auburn	0	–	7	–	0	2	–	7	–	0
$ – Conference champion; Rankings from Dickinson System

The 1929 Virginia Cavaliers football team represented the University of Virginia as a member of the Southern Conference (SoCon) during the 1929 college football season. Led by first-year head coach Earl Abell, the Cavaliers compiled an overall record of 4–3–2 with a mark of 1–3–2 in conference play, placing 16th in the SoCon. The team played its games at Lambeth Field in Charlottesville, Virginia.

== Schedule ==
Date	Opponent	Site	Result	Attendance	Source
September 28	Randolph–Macon*	Lambeth Field; Charlottesville, VA	W 27–6		
October 5	at South Carolina	Melton Field; Columbia, SC	W 6–0		
October 12	Swarthmore*	Lambeth Field; Charlottesville, VA	W 12–7		
October 19	VMI	Lambeth Field; Charlottesville, VA	L 7–20		
October 26	St. John's (MD)*	Lambeth Field; Charlottesville, VA	W 32–7		
November 2	at Maryland	Byrd Stadium; College Park, MD (rivalry)	T 13–13		
November 9	VPI^{†}	Lambuth Field; Charlottesville, VA (rivalry)	L 12–32		
November 16	at Washington and Lee	Wilson Field; Lexington, VA	T 13–13	7,000	
November 28	at North Carolina	Kenan Memorial Stadium; Chapel Hill, NC (rivalry)	L 7–41	30,000	
*Non-conference game; ^{†}Homecoming
