= 1929 Southern Conference football season =

- League: NCAA
- Sport: College football
- Duration: September 21, 1929 through December 7, 1929
- Teams: 23

Regular Season
- Season champions: Tulane

Football seasons
- ← 1928 1930 →

1929 Southern Conference football standings
	Conf.					Overall
Team	W		L		T	W		L		T
No. 10 Tulane $	6	–	0	–	0	9	–	0	–	0
Tennessee	6	–	0	–	1	9	–	0	–	1
North Carolina	7	–	1	–	0	9	–	1	–	0
Florida	6	–	1	–	0	8	–	2	–	0
Vanderbilt	5	–	1	–	0	7	–	2	–	0
Kentucky	3	–	1	–	1	6	–	1	–	1
Georgia	4	–	2	–	0	6	–	4	–	0
VMI	4	–	2	–	0	8	–	2	–	0
Duke	2	–	1	–	0	4	–	6	–	0
LSU	3	–	2	–	0	6	–	3	–	0
Alabama	4	–	3	–	0	6	–	3	–	0
Clemson	3	–	3	–	0	8	–	3	–	0
VPI	2	–	3	–	0	5	–	4	–	0
Georgia Tech	3	–	5	–	0	3	–	6	–	0
South Carolina	2	–	5	–	0	6	–	5	–	0
Virginia	1	–	3	–	2	4	–	3	–	2
Maryland	1	–	3	–	1	4	–	4	–	2
Washington and Lee	1	–	4	–	1	3	–	5	–	1
Ole Miss	0	–	4	–	2	1	–	6	–	2
Mississippi A&M	0	–	3	–	1	1	–	5	–	2
Sewanee	0	–	4	–	1	2	–	5	–	2
NC State	0	–	5	–	0	1	–	8	–	0
Auburn	0	–	7	–	0	2	–	7	–	0
$ – Conference champion; Rankings from Dickinson System

The 1929 Southern Conference football season was the college football games played by the member schools of the Southern Conference as part of the 1929 college football season. The season began on September 21. Led by captain Bill Banker, the Tulane Green Wave posted a 9–0, undefeated record.

== Regular season ==
Index to colors and formatting
Non-conference matchup; SoCon member won
Non-conference matchup; SoCon member lost
Non-conference matchup; tie
Conference matchup

SoCon teams in bold.

=== Week One ===
Date	Visiting team	Home team	Site	Result	Attendance	Reference
September 21	Newberry	**Clemson**	Riggs Field • Calhoun, South Carolina	**W** 68–0		
September 21	Hampden–Sydney	**VMI**	Alumni Field • Lexington, Virginia	**W** 19–0		

=== Week Two ===
Date	Visiting team	Home team	Site	Result	Attendance	Reference
September 27	Birmingham–Southern	**Auburn**	Cramton Bowl • Montgomery, Alabama	**W** 7–0	7,500	
September 27	Washington College	**Maryland**	Byrd Stadium • College Park, Maryland	**W** 34–7		
September 27	Henderson-Brown	**Mississippi A&M**	Scott Field • Starkville, Mississippi	**L** 7–0		
September 28	Mississippi College	**Alabama**	Denny Stadium • Tuscaloosa, Alabama	**W** 55–0	6,000	
September 28	**Clemson**	Davidson	Central H.S. Stadium • Charlotte, North Carolina	**W** 32–14		
September 28	**Duke**	Mercer	Centennial Stadium • Macon, Georgia	**W** 19–6		
September 28	Southern College	**Florida**	Fleming Field • Gainesville, Florida	**W** 54–0		
September 28	Oglethorpe	**Georgia**	Sanford Field • Athens, Georgia	**L** 13–6		
September 28	Louisiana College	**LSU**	Tiger Stadium • Baton Rouge, Louisiana	**W** 58–0		
September 28	Wake Forest	**North Carolina**	Kenan Memorial Stadium • Chapel Hill, North Carolina	**W** 48–0	10,000	
September 28	Tennessee Tech	**Sewanee**	Hardee Field • Sewanee, Tennessee	**W** 46–0	1,500	
September 28	Erskine	**South Carolina**	Columbia, South Carolina	**W** 26–7	5,000	
September 28	Centre	**Tennessee**	Shields–Watkins Field • Knoxville, Tennessee	**W** 40–0	8,000	
September 28	Louisiana Normal	**Tulane**	Tulane Stadium • New Orleans, Louisiana	**W** 40–6	10,000	
September 28	**Ole Miss**	**Vanderbilt**	Dudley Field • Nashville, Tennessee	**VAN** 19–7		
September 28	Randolph–Macon	**Virginia**	Lambeth Field • Charlottesville, Virginia	**W** 27–6		
September 28	Richmond	**VMI**	Alumni Field • Lexington, Virginia	**W** 40–0		
September 28	Roanoke	**VPI**	Miles Stadium • Blacksburg, Virginia	**W** 19–0		
September 28	Lynchburg	**Washington & Lee**	Wilson Field • Lexington, Virginia	**W** 64–6		

=== Week Three ===
Date	Visiting team	Home team	Site	Result	Attendance	Reference
October 4	**Washington & Lee**	**NC State**	Riddick Stadium • Raleigh, North Carolina	**W&L** 27–6		
October 5	**Ole Miss**	**Alabama**	Denny Stadium • Tuscaloosa, Alabama	**ALA** 22–7	12,000	
October 5	**Auburn**	**Clemson**	Riggs Field • Calhoun, South Carolina	**CLEM** 26–7		
October 5	Pittsburgh	**Duke**	Duke Stadium • Durham, North Carolina	**L** 7–52		
October 5	**VMI**	**Florida**	Plant Field • Tampa, Florida	**FLA** 12–7	10,000	
October 5	Furman	**Georgia**	Sanford Field • Athens, Georgia	**W** 27–0		
October 5	**Mississippi A&M**	**Georgia Tech**	Grant Field • Atlanta, Georgia	**GT** 27–13	12,000	
October 5	Maryville (TN)	**Kentucky**	Stoll Field • Lexington, Kentucky	**W** 40–0	8,000	
October 5	Southwestern Louisiana	**LSU**	Tiger Stadium • Baton Rouge, Louisiana	**W** 58–0		
October 5	**North Carolina**	**Maryland**	Byrd Stadium • College Park, Maryland	**UNC** 43–0	6,000	
October 5	Transylvania	**Sewanee**	Hardee Field • Sewanee, Tennessee	**T** 6–6		
October 5	**Tennessee**	Chattanooga	Chamberlain Field • Chattanooga, Tennessee	**W** 20–0	10,000	
October 5	Ouachita Baptist	**Vanderbilt**	Dudley Field • Nashville, Tennessee	**W** 26–6		
October 5	**Virginia**	**South Carolina**	Melton Field • Columbia, South Carolina	**UVA** 6–0		
October 5	Hampden–Sydney	**VPI**	Miles Stadium • Blacksburg, Virginia	**W** 37–6		

=== Week Four ===
Date	Visiting team	Home team	Site	Result	Attendance	Reference
October 11	**NC State**	**Clemson**	Pee Dee Fairgrounds • Florence, South Carolina	**CLEM** 26–0		
October 11	**Florida**	**Auburn**	Cramton Bowl • Montgomery, Alabama	**FLA** 19–0		
October 12	Chattanooga	**Alabama**	Denny Stadium • Tuscaloosa, Alabama	**W** 46–0	5,000	
October 12	Yale	**Georgia**	Sanford Stadium • Athens, Georgia	**W** 15–0	30,000-35,000	
October 12	**South Carolina**	**Maryland**	Byrd Stadium • College Park, Maryland	**SCAR** 26–6		
October 12	**Sewanee**	**LSU**	Tiger Stadium • Baton Rouge, Louisiana	**LSU** 27–14		
October 12	**North Carolina**	**Georgia Tech**	Grant Field • Atlanta, Georgia	**UNC** 18–7	25,000	
October 12	**Ole Miss**	**Tennessee**	Shields–Watkins Field • Knoxville, Tennessee	**TENN** 52–7		
October 12	**Mississippi A&M**	**Tulane**	Tulane Stadium • New Orleans, Louisiana	**TUL** 34–0		
October 12	**Vanderbilt**	Minnesota	Memorial Stadium • Minneapolis	**L** 15–6	25,000	
October 12	Swarthmore	**Virginia**	Lambeth Field • Charlottesville, Virginia	**W** 12–7		
October 12	The Citadel	**VMI**	Alumni Field • Lexington, Virginia	**W** 13–7		
October 12	**VPI**	Penn	Franklin Field • Philadelphia, Pennsylvania	**L** 14–8		
October 12	**Washington & Lee**	**Kentucky**	Stoll Field • Lexington, Kentucky	**UK** 20–6		

=== Week Five ===
Date	Visiting team	Home team	Site	Result	Attendance	Reference
October 17	Wake Forest	**NC State**	Riddick Stadium • Raleigh, North Carolina	**W** 8–6		
October 18	**Clemson**	Wofford	Snyder Field • Spartanburg, South Carolina	**W** 30–0		
October 18	**Ole Miss**	Loyola (LA)	Loyola University Stadium • New Orleans, Louisiana	**W** 26–24		
October 18	Presbyterian	**South Carolina**	Melton Field • Columbia, South Carolina	**W** 41–0		
October 19	**Alabama**	**Tennessee**	Shields–Watkins Field • Knoxville, Tennessee	**TENN** 6–0	20,000	
October 19	**Vanderbilt**	**Auburn**	Legion Field • Birmingham, Alabama	**VAN** 41–2		
October 19	**Duke**	Navy	Thompson Stadium • Annapolis, Maryland	**L** 13–45		
October 19	**Florida**	**Georgia Tech**	Grant Field • Atlanta, Georgia	**GT** 19–6	7,000	
October 19	**Georgia**	**North Carolina**	Kenan Memorial Stadium • Chapel Hill, North Carolina	**UGA** 19–12	24,000	
October 19	**Mississippi A&M**	**LSU**	Municipal Stadium • Jackson, Mississippi	**LSU** 31–6		
October 19	Gallaudet	**Maryland**	Byrd Stadium • College Park, Maryland	**W** 13–6		
October 19	Cumberland (TN)	**Sewanee**	Hardee Field • Sewanee, Tennessee	**W** 33–6		
October 19	Southwestern Louisiana	**Tulane**	Tulane Stadium • New Orleans, Louisiana	**W** 60–0		
October 19	**VMI**	**Virginia**	Lambeth Field • Charlottesville, Virginia]	**VMI** 20–7		
October 19	William & Mary	**VPI**	City Stadium • Richmond, Virginia	**W** 25–14	12,000	
October 19	**Washington & Lee**	West Virginia	Laidley Field • Charleston, West Virginia	**L** 26–6	15,000	

=== Week Six ===
Date	Visiting team	Home team	Site	Result	Attendance	Reference
October 24	**Clemson**	**South Carolina**	State Fairgrounds • Columbia, South Carolina	**CLEM** 21–14		
October 26	**Sewanee**	**Alabama**	Legion Field • Birmingham, Alabama	**ALA** 35–7		
October 26	Howard (AL)	**Auburn**	Drake Field • Auburn, Alabama	**W** 6–0		
October 26	**Georgia**	**Florida**	Fairfield Stadium • Jacksonville, Florida	**FLA** 18–6	20,000	
October 26	**Duke**	Villanova	Villanova Stadium • Villanova, Pennsylvania	**L** 12–58		
October 26	**Georgia Tech**	**Tulane**	Tulane Stadium • New Orleans, Louisiana	**TUL** 20–14	20,000	
October 26	**Kentucky**	Centre	Cheek Field • Danville, Kentucky	**W** 33–0		
October 26	Louisiana Tech	**LSU**	Tiger Stadium • Baton Rouge, Louisiana	**W** 53–7		
October 26	**Maryland**	**VMI**	City Stadium • Richmond, Virginia	**VMI** 7–6	7,000	
October 26	**Ole Miss**	SMU	Fair Park Stadium • Dallas, Texas	**L** 52–0		
October 26	**VPI**	**North Carolina**	Kenan Memorial Stadium • Chapel Hill, North Carolina	**UNC** 38–13	8,000	
October 26	**NC State**	Michigan State	College Field • East Lansing, Michigan	**L** 40–6		
October 26	Maryville (TN)	**Vanderbilt**	Dudley Field • Nashville, Tennessee	**W** 33–0		
October 26	St. John's (MD)	**Virginia**	Lambeth Field • Charlottesville, Virginia	**W** 32–7		
October 26	**Tennessee**	**Washington & Lee**	Maher Field • Roanoke, Virginia	**TENN** 39–0		

=== Week Seven ===
Date	Visiting team	Home team	Site	Result	Attendance	Reference
October 31	**South Carolina**	The Citadel	County Fairgrounds • Orangeburg, South Carolina	**W** 27–14		
November 1	**Tulane**	**Georgia**	McClung Stadium • Columbus, Georgia	**TUL** 21–15	15,000	
November 2	**Auburn**	**Tennessee**	Shields–Watkins Field • Knoxville, Tennessee	**TENN** 27–0		
November 2	**Clemson**	**Kentucky**	Stoll Field • Lexington, Kentucky	**UK** 44–6		
October 26	**Duke**	Boston College	Fenway Park • Boston, Massachusetts	**L** 12–20		
November 2	**Florida**	Harvard	Harvard Stadium • Boston, Massachusetts	**L** 14–0	35,000	
November 2	Notre Dame	**Georgia Tech**	Grant Field • Atlanta, Georgia	**L** 26–6	22,000	
November 2	Arkansas	**LSU**	State Fair Stadium • Shreveport, Louisiana	**L** 32–0		
November 2	**Virginia**	**Maryland**	Byrd Stadium • College Park, Maryland	**T** 13–13		
November 2	**Sewanee**	**Ole Miss**	Hemingway Stadium • Oxford, Mississippi	**T** 6–6		
November 2	Mississippi College	**Mississippi A&M**	Scott Field • Starkville, Mississippi	**W** 6–0		
November 2	**NC State**	**North Carolina**	Kenan Memorial Stadium • Chapel Hill, North Carolina	**UNC** 32–0		
November 2	**Alabama**	**Vanderbilt**	Dudley Field • Nashville, Tennessee	**VAN** 13–0	15,000	
November 2	**VMI**	Davidson	Richardson Field • Davidson, North Carolina	**W** 12–6		
November 2	**VPI**	**Washington & Lee**	Municipal Stadium • Lynchburg, Virginia	**VPI** 36–6		

=== Week Eight ===
Date	Visiting team	Home team	Site	Result	Attendance	Reference
November 9	**Kentucky**	**Alabama**	Cramton Bowl • Montgomery, Alabama	**ALA** 24–13	8,000	
November 9	**Auburn**	**Tulane**	Tulane Stadium • New Orleans, Louisiana	**TUL** 52–0	10,000	
November 9	**Clemson**	**VMI**	League Park • Norfolk, Virginia	**VMI** 12–0		
November 9	**Georgia**	NYU	Yankee Stadium • Bronx, New York	**L** 27–19	42,000	
November 9	**Georgia Tech**	**Vanderbilt**	Dudley Field • Nashville, Tennessee	**VAN** 23–7		
November 9	**LSU**	**Duke**	Duke Stadium • Durham, North Carolina	**DUKE** 32–6		
November 9	**Maryland**	Yale	Yale Bowl • New Haven, Connecticut	**T** 13–13	45,000	
November 9	**Ole Miss**	Purdue	Ross–Ade Stadium • West Lafayette, Indiana	**L** 27–7		
November 9	Michigan State	**Mississippi A&M**	Municipal Stadium • Jackson, Mississippi	**L** 33–19	2,000	
November 9	Davidson	**NC State**	Riddick Stadium • Raleigh, North Carolina	**L** 13–0		
November 9	**North Carolina**	**South Carolina**	Melton Field • Columbia, South Carolina	**UNC** 40–0	7,000	
November 9	**Sewanee**	Southwestern (TN)	Fargason Field • Memphis, Tennessee	**L** 9–0	5,000	
November 9	Carson–Newman	**Tennessee**	Shields–Watkins Field • Knoxville, Tennessee	**W** 73–0		
November 9	**VPI**	**Virginia**	Lambeth Field • Charlottesville, Virginia	**VPI** 32–12		
November 9	St. John's (MD)	**Washington & Lee**	Wilson Field • Lexington, Virginia	**W** 18–6		

=== Week Nine ===
Date	Visiting team	Home team	Site	Result	Attendance	Reference
November 16	**Alabama**	**Georgia Tech**	Grant Field • Atlanta, Georgia	**ALA** 14–0		
November 16	**Auburn**	**Georgia**	Sanford Field • Athens, Georgia	**UGA** 24–0	3,000	
November 16	**Clemson**	**Florida**	Fleming Field • Gainesville, Florida	**FLA** 13–7	12,000	
November 16	**Kentucky**	**VMI**	Alumni Field • Lexington, Virginia	**UK** 23–12		
November 16	**Ole Miss**	**LSU**	Tiger Stadium • Baton Rouge, Louisiana	**LSU** 13–6		
November 16	**VPI**	**Maryland**	League Park • Norfolk, Virginia	**MD** 24–0		
November 16	Millsaps	**Mississippi A&M**	Scott Field • Starkville, Mississippi	**T** 0–0		
November 16	**North Carolina**	Davidson	Richardson Field • Davidson, North Carolina	**W** 26–7	7,000	
November 16	**NC State**	**Duke**	Duke Stadium • Durham, North Carolina	**DUKE** 19–12		
November 16	**South Carolina**	Furman	Manly Field • Greenville, South Carolina	**W** 2–0		
November 16	**Sewanee**	**Tulane**	Tulane Stadium • New Orleans, Louisiana	**TUL** 18–0		
November 16	**Vanderbilt**	**Tennessee**	Shields–Watkins Field • Knoxville, Tennessee	**TENN** 13–0		
November 16	**Virginia**	**Washington & Lee**	Wilson Field • Lexington, Virginia	**T** 13–13	7,000	

=== Week Ten ===
Date	Visiting team	Home team	Site	Result	Attendance	Reference
November 23	The Citadel	**Clemson**	Riggs Field • Calhoun, South Carolina	**W** 13–0		
November 23	Wake Forest	**Duke**	Duke Stadium • Durham, North Carolina	**W** 20–0	750	
November 23	**Florida**	**South Carolina**	Melton Field • Columbia, South Carolina	**FLA** 20–7		
November 23	**Sewanee**	**Vanderbilt**	Dudley Field • Nashville, Tennessee	**VAN** 26–6		

=== Week Eleven ===
Date	Visiting team	Home team	Site	Result	Attendance	Reference
November 28	**Georgia**	**Alabama**	Legion Field • Birmingham, Alabama	**UGA** 12–0	20,488	
November 28	Furman	**Clemson**	Riggs Field • Calhoun, South Carolina	**W** 7–6		
November 28	**Washington & Lee**	**Florida**	Fairfield Stadium • Jacksonville, Florida	**FLA** 25–7	12,000	
November 28	**Auburn**	**Georgia Tech**	Grant Field • Atlanta, Georgia	**GT** 19–6		
November 28	**Tennessee**	**Kentucky**	Stoll Field • Lexington, Kentucky	**T** 6–6	20,000	
November 28	**Tulane**	**LSU**	Tiger Stadium • Baton Rouge, Louisiana	**TUL** 21–0	23,000	
November 28	Johns Hopkins	**Maryland**	Baltimore Stadium • Baltimore, Maryland	**W** 39–8	12,000	
November 28	**Mississippi A&M**	**Ole Miss**	Hemingway Stadium • Oxford, Mississippi	**T** 7–7		
November 28	**Virginia**	**North Carolina**	Kenan Memorial Stadium • Chapel Hill, North Carolina	**UNC** 41–7	30,000	
November 28	**VMI**	**VPI**	Maher Field • Roanoke, Virginia	**VMI** 16–6		
November 30	**Duke**	Davidson	Davidson Field • Davidson, North Carolina	**L** 13–12		
November 30	**South Carolina**	**NC State**	Riddick Stadium • Raleigh, North Carolina	**SCAR** 20–6		

=== Week Twelve ===
Date	Visiting team	Home team	Site	Result	Attendance	Reference
December 7	Oregon	**Florida**	Madison Square Garden Stadium • Miami, Florida	**W** 20–6	17,000	
December 7	**Georgia Tech**	**Georgia**	Sanford Stadium • Athens, Georgia	**UGA** 12–6	25,000	
December 7	**Maryland**	Western Maryland	Baltimore Stadium • Baltimore, Maryland	**L** 12–0	12,000	
December 7	**North Carolina**	**Duke**	Duke Stadium • Durham, North Carolina	**UNC** 48–7	13,000	
December 7	**South Carolina**	**Tennessee**	Shields–Watkins Field • Knoxville, Tennessee	**TENN** 54–0	10,000	

== Awards and honors ==
=== All-Americans ===
- E – Vernon "Catfish" Smith, Georgia (AP-2; NEA-3)
- E – Dale Van Sickel, Florida (CP-2)
- T – Fred Sington, Alabama (AP-3; UP-2 [g]; INS-2 [g]; NYP-1; DW-2 [g])
- G – Ray Farris, North Carolina (AP-3; NEA-2)
- G – Bull Brown, Vanderbilt (NYS-2; NANA-1)
- HB – Gene McEver, Tennessee (AP-2; UP-1; NEA-1; NANA-1; CP-1; NYP-2; DW-3)
- HB – Bill Banker, Tulane (AP-3; UP-3 [fb]; NEA-2; INS-3; NYP-1; AAB-1; DW-1; LP-1)
- FB – Tony Holm, Alabama (AP-1; INS-2)

=== All-Southern team ===
The following includes the composite All-Southern team of more than 50 coaches and sports writers compiled by the Associated Press.

Position	Name	First-team selectors	Team
QB	Bobby Dodd	AP, UP, AJ	Tennessee
HB	Gene McEver	AP, UP, AJ, CP	Tennessee
HB	Bill Banker	AP, UP, AJ, CP	Tulane
FB	Tony Holm	AP, UP, AJ, CP	Alabama
E	Vernon "Catfish" Smith	AP, UP	Georgia
T	Fred Sington	AP, AJ, CP	Alabama
G	Ray Farris	AP, UP, AJ	North Carolina
C	Lloyd Roberts	AP, UP, AJ	Tulane
G	Bull Brown	AP, AJ	Vanderbilt
T	Dick Abernathy	AP	Vanderbilt
E	Dale Van Sickel	AP, CP	Florida
