= 1929 South Carolina Gamecocks football team =

American college football season

1929 South Carolina Gamecocks football
- Conference: Southern Conference
- Record: 6–5 (2–5 SoCon)
- Head coach: Billy Laval (2nd season)
- Captain: Julian Beall
- Home stadium: Melton Field

1929 Southern Conference football standings
	Conf.					Overall
Team	W		L		T	W		L		T
No. 10 Tulane $	6	–	0	–	0	9	–	0	–	0
Tennessee	6	–	0	–	1	9	–	0	–	1
North Carolina	7	–	1	–	0	9	–	1	–	0
Florida	6	–	1	–	0	8	–	2	–	0
Vanderbilt	5	–	1	–	0	7	–	2	–	0
Kentucky	3	–	1	–	1	6	–	1	–	1
Georgia	4	–	2	–	0	6	–	4	–	0
VMI	4	–	2	–	0	8	–	2	–	0
Duke	2	–	1	–	0	4	–	6	–	0
LSU	3	–	2	–	0	6	–	3	–	0
Alabama	4	–	3	–	0	6	–	3	–	0
Clemson	3	–	3	–	0	8	–	3	–	0
VPI	2	–	3	–	0	5	–	4	–	0
Georgia Tech	3	–	5	–	0	3	–	6	–	0
South Carolina	2	–	5	–	0	6	–	5	–	0
Virginia	1	–	3	–	2	4	–	3	–	2
Maryland	1	–	3	–	1	4	–	4	–	2
Washington and Lee	1	–	4	–	1	3	–	5	–	1
Ole Miss	0	–	4	–	2	1	–	6	–	2
Mississippi A&M	0	–	3	–	1	1	–	5	–	2
Sewanee	0	–	4	–	1	2	–	5	–	2
NC State	0	–	5	–	0	1	–	8	–	0
Auburn	0	–	7	–	0	2	–	7	–	0
$ – Conference champion; Rankings from Dickinson System

The 1929 South Carolina Gamecocks football team was an American football team that represented the University of South Carolina as a member of the Southern Conference (SoCon) during the 1929 season. Led by second-year head coach Billy Laval, the Gamecocks compiled an overall record of 6–5 with a mark of 2–5 in conference play, placing 15th in the SoCon. Captain and center Julian Beall was second-team All-Southern.

== Schedule ==
Date	Opponent	Site	Result	Attendance	Source
September 28	Erskine*	Melton Field; Columbia, SC	W 26–7	5,000	
October 5	Virginia	Melton Field; Columbia, SC	L 0–6		
October 12	at Maryland	Byrd Stadium; College Park, MD	W 26–6		
October 18	Presbyterian*	Melton Field; Columbia, SC	W 41–0		
October 24	Clemson	State Fairgrounds; Columbia, SC (rivalry)	L 14–21		
October 31	vs. The Citadel*	County Fairgrounds; Orangeburg, SC	W 27–14		
November 9	North Carolina	Melton Field; Columbia, SC (rivalry)	L 0–40	7,000	
November 16	at Furman*	Manly Field; Greenville, SC	W 2–0		
November 23	Florida	Melton Field; Columbia, SC	L 7–20		
November 30	at NC State	Riddick Stadium; Raleigh, NC	W 20–6	2,000	
December 7	at Tennessee	Shields–Watkins Field; Knoxville, TN (rivalry)	L 0–54	10,000	
*Non-conference game
