= 1929 North Carolina Tar Heels football team =

American college football season

1929 North Carolina Tar Heels football
- Conference: Southern Conference
- Record: 9–1 (7–1 SoCon)
- Head coach: Chuck Collins (4th season)
- Captain: Ray Farris
- Home stadium: Kenan Memorial Stadium

Uniform
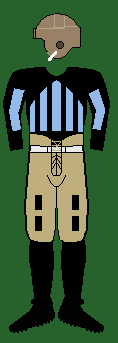

1929 Southern Conference football standings
	Conf.					Overall
Team	W		L		T	W		L		T
No. 10 Tulane $	6	–	0	–	0	9	–	0	–	0
Tennessee	6	–	0	–	1	9	–	0	–	1
North Carolina	7	–	1	–	0	9	–	1	–	0
Florida	6	–	1	–	0	8	–	2	–	0
Vanderbilt	5	–	1	–	0	7	–	2	–	0
Kentucky	3	–	1	–	1	6	–	1	–	1
Georgia	4	–	2	–	0	6	–	4	–	0
VMI	4	–	2	–	0	8	–	2	–	0
Duke	2	–	1	–	0	4	–	6	–	0
LSU	3	–	2	–	0	6	–	3	–	0
Alabama	4	–	3	–	0	6	–	3	–	0
Clemson	3	–	3	–	0	8	–	3	–	0
VPI	2	–	3	–	0	5	–	4	–	0
Georgia Tech	3	–	5	–	0	3	–	6	–	0
South Carolina	2	–	5	–	0	6	–	5	–	0
Virginia	1	–	3	–	2	4	–	3	–	2
Maryland	1	–	3	–	1	4	–	4	–	2
Washington and Lee	1	–	4	–	1	3	–	5	–	1
Ole Miss	0	–	4	–	2	1	–	6	–	2
Mississippi A&M	0	–	3	–	1	1	–	5	–	2
Sewanee	0	–	4	–	1	2	–	5	–	2
NC State	0	–	5	–	0	1	–	8	–	0
Auburn	0	–	7	–	0	2	–	7	–	0
$ – Conference champion; Rankings from Dickinson System

The 1929 North Carolina Tar Heels football team represented the University of North Carolina (now known as the University of North Carolina at Chapel Hill) during the 1929 college football season as a member of the Southern Conference (SoCon). The Tar Heels were led by head coach Chuck Collins in his fourth season and finished with a record of nine wins and one loss (9–1 overall, 7–1 in the SoCon). The team scored a total of 346 points.

== Schedule ==
Date	Time	Opponent	Site	Result	Attendance	Source
September 28	2:30 p.m.	Wake Forest*	Kenan Memorial Stadium; Chapel Hill, NC (rivalry)	W 48–0	10,000	
October 5	2:30 p.m.	at Maryland	Byrd Stadium; College Park, MD	W 43–0	6,000	
October 11	3:30 p.m.	at Georgia Tech	Grant Field; Atlanta, GA	W 18–7	25,000	
October 19	2:30 p.m.	Georgia	Kenan Memorial Stadium; Chapel Hill, NC	L 12–19	24,000	
October 26	2:30 p.m.	VPI	Kenan Memorial Stadium; Chapel Hill, NC	W 38–13	8,000	
November 2	2:30 p.m.	NC State	Kenan Memorial Stadium; Chapel Hill, NC (rivalry)	W 32–0		
November 9	2:30 p.m.	at South Carolina	Melton Field; Columbia, SC	W 40–0	7,000	
November 16	2:30 p.m.	at Davidson*	Richardson Stadium; Davidson, NC	W 26–6	7,000	
November 28	2:00 p.m.	Virginia	Kenan Memorial Stadium; Chapel Hill, NC (rivalry)	W 41–7	30,000	
December 7	2:00 p.m.	at Duke	Duke Stadium; Durham, NC (rivalry)	W 48–7	13,000	
*Non-conference game; All times are in Eastern time
