= 1929 Maryland Aggies football team =

American college football season

1929 Maryland Aggies football
- Conference: Southern Conference
- Record: 4–4–2 (1–3–1 SoCon)
- Head coach: Curley Byrd (19th season)
- Home stadium: Byrd Stadium (original)

1929 Southern Conference football standings
	Conf.					Overall
Team	W		L		T	W		L		T
No. 10 Tulane $	6	–	0	–	0	9	–	0	–	0
Tennessee	6	–	0	–	1	9	–	0	–	1
North Carolina	7	–	1	–	0	9	–	1	–	0
Florida	6	–	1	–	0	8	–	2	–	0
Vanderbilt	5	–	1	–	0	7	–	2	–	0
Kentucky	3	–	1	–	1	6	–	1	–	1
Georgia	4	–	2	–	0	6	–	4	–	0
VMI	4	–	2	–	0	8	–	2	–	0
Duke	2	–	1	–	0	4	–	6	–	0
LSU	3	–	2	–	0	6	–	3	–	0
Alabama	4	–	3	–	0	6	–	3	–	0
Clemson	3	–	3	–	0	8	–	3	–	0
VPI	2	–	3	–	0	5	–	4	–	0
Georgia Tech	3	–	5	–	0	3	–	6	–	0
South Carolina	2	–	5	–	0	6	–	5	–	0
Virginia	1	–	3	–	2	4	–	3	–	2
Maryland	1	–	3	–	1	4	–	4	–	2
Washington and Lee	1	–	4	–	1	3	–	5	–	1
Ole Miss	0	–	4	–	2	1	–	6	–	2
Mississippi A&M	0	–	3	–	1	1	–	5	–	2
Sewanee	0	–	4	–	1	2	–	5	–	2
NC State	0	–	5	–	0	1	–	8	–	0
Auburn	0	–	7	–	0	2	–	7	–	0
$ – Conference champion; Rankings from Dickinson System

The 1929 Maryland Aggies football team was an American football team that represented the University of Maryland in the Southern Conference (SoCon) during the 1929 college football season. In their 19th season under head coach Curley Byrd, the Aggies compiled a 4–4–2 record (1–3–1 against SoCon opponents), finished 17th in the conference, and outscored their opponents by a total of 148 to 133.

== Schedule ==
Date	Opponent	Site	Result	Attendance	Source
September 28	Washington College*	Byrd Stadium; College Park, MD	W 34–7		
October 5	North Carolina	Byrd Stadium; College Park, MD	L 0–43	6,000	
October 12	South Carolina	Byrd Stadium; College Park, MD	L 6–26		
October 19	Gallaudet*	Byrd Stadium; College Park, MD	W 13–6		
October 26	at VMI	City Stadium; Richmond, VA	L 6–7	7,000	
November 2	Virginia	Byrd Stadium; College Park, MD (rivalry)	T 13–13		
November 9	at Yale*	Yale Bowl; New Haven, CT	T 13–13	45,000	
November 16	at VPI	League Park; Norfolk, VA	W 24–0		
November 28	at Johns Hopkins*	Baltimore Stadium; Baltimore, MD	W 39–6	12,000	
December 7	vs. Western Maryland*	Baltimore Stadium; Baltimore, MD	L 0–12	25,000	
*Non-conference game
