= 1929 Tulane Green Wave football team =

American college football season

1929 Tulane Green Wave football
- 1929 photograph of Tulane Green Wave football player Ike Armstrong.

SoCon champion
- Conference: Southern Conference
- Record: 9–0 (6–0 SoCon)
- Head coach: Bernie Bierman (3rd season)
- Offensive scheme: Single-wing
- Captain: Bill Banker
- Home stadium: Tulane Stadium

1929 Southern Conference football standings
	Conf.					Overall
Team	W		L		T	W		L		T
No. 10 Tulane $	6	–	0	–	0	9	–	0	–	0
Tennessee	6	–	0	–	1	9	–	0	–	1
North Carolina	7	–	1	–	0	9	–	1	–	0
Florida	6	–	1	–	0	8	–	2	–	0
Vanderbilt	5	–	1	–	0	7	–	2	–	0
Kentucky	3	–	1	–	1	6	–	1	–	1
Georgia	4	–	2	–	0	6	–	4	–	0
VMI	4	–	2	–	0	8	–	2	–	0
Duke	2	–	1	–	0	4	–	6	–	0
LSU	3	–	2	–	0	6	–	3	–	0
Alabama	4	–	3	–	0	6	–	3	–	0
Clemson	3	–	3	–	0	8	–	3	–	0
VPI	2	–	3	–	0	5	–	4	–	0
Georgia Tech	3	–	5	–	0	3	–	6	–	0
South Carolina	2	–	5	–	0	6	–	5	–	0
Virginia	1	–	3	–	2	4	–	3	–	2
Maryland	1	–	3	–	1	4	–	4	–	2
Washington and Lee	1	–	4	–	1	3	–	5	–	1
Ole Miss	0	–	4	–	2	1	–	6	–	2
Mississippi A&M	0	–	3	–	1	1	–	5	–	2
Sewanee	0	–	4	–	1	2	–	5	–	2
NC State	0	–	5	–	0	1	–	8	–	0
Auburn	0	–	7	–	0	2	–	7	–	0
$ – Conference champion; Rankings from Dickinson System

The 1929 Tulane Green Wave football team was an American football team that represented Tulane University as a member of the Southern Conference (SoCon) during the 1929 college football season. In its third year under head coach Bernie Bierman, who used the single wing, Tulane compiled a perfect 9–0 record (6–0 in conference games), won the SoCon championship, shut out five of nine opponents, and outscored all opponents by a total of 297 to 45.

Halfback and team captain Bill Banker, known as the "Blonde Blizzard", was selected as a first-team All-American by the All-America Board of Football, consisting of coaches Knute Rockne, "Pop" Warner, Tad Jones and Bill Alexander. Four Tulane players received All-Southern honors from the Associated Press (AP): Banker and center Loyd Roberts were first team; end Jerry Dalrymple and guard Maury Bodenger were second team.

The team played its home games at Tulane Stadium in New Orleans.

== Schedule ==
Date	Opponent	Site	Result	Attendance	Source
September 28	Louisiana Normal*	Tulane Stadium; New Orleans, LA	W 40–6	10,000	
October 5	Texas A&M*	Tulane Stadium; New Orleans, LA	W 13–10		
October 12	Mississippi A&M	Tulane Stadium; New Orleans, LA	W 34–0		
October 19	Southwestern Louisiana*	Tulane Stadium; New Orleans, LA	W 60–0		
October 26	Georgia Tech	Tulane Stadium; New Orleans, LA	W 20–14	25,000	
November 1	vs. Georgia	Memorial Stadium; Columbus, GA	W 21–15	15,000	
November 9	Auburn	Tulane Stadium; New Orleans, LA (rivalry)	W 52–0	10,000	
November 16	Sewanee	Tulane Stadium; New Orleans, LA	W 18–0		
November 28	at LSU	Tiger Stadium; Baton Rouge, LA (Battle for the Rag)	W 21–0	23,000	
*Non-conference game

== Game summaries ==
=== Louisiana Normal ===
In the season opener against Louisiana Normal (today Northwestern State), Tulane won 40–6.

The starting lineup was Holland (left end), McCanse (left tackle), Bodenger (left guard), Upton (center), Roberts (right guard), Rucker (right tackle), Dalrymple (right end), Baumbach (quarterback), Armstrong (left halfback), Banker (right halfback), Seeuws (fullback).

=== Texas A&M ===
After leading at the half 7–2, Tulane allowed the Texas A&M Aggies to take the lead 8–7. A pass from Ike Armstrong to Wop Glover in the last quarter got the win. After a safety, Tulane won 13–10.

The starting lineup was Holland (left end), McCanse (left tackle), Bodenger (left guard), Upton (center), Roberts (right guard), Rucker (right tackle), Dalrymple (right end), Baumbach (quarterback), Armstrong (left halfback), Banker (right halfback), Seeuws (fullback).

=== Mississippi A&M ===
In the third week of play, Tulane defeated the Mississippi Aggies 34–0. The starting lineup was Holland (left end), McCanse (left tackle), Bodenger (left guard), Roberts (center), Upton (right guard), Rucker (right tackle), Dalrymple (right end), Baumbach (quarterback), Armstrong (left halfback), Banker (right halfback), Seeuws (fullback).

=== Southwestern Louisiana ===
SW Louisiana at Tulane

Team	1	2	3	4	Total
SW Louisiana	0	0	0	0	0
• Tulane	19	13	14	14	60

- Date: October 19
- Location: New Orleans, LA
- Game attendance: 10,000

The Green Wave romped 60–0 over Southwestern Louisiana. The starting lineup was Holland (left end), McCanse (left tackle), Bodenger (left guard), Roberts (center), Upton (right guard), Rucker (right tackle), Dalrymple (right end), Baumbach (quarterback), Armstrong (left halfback), Banker (right halfback), Seeuws (fullback).

=== Georgia Tech ===
During the game with Georgia Tech, Banker wore a helmet onto the field because coach Bernie Bierman threatened to yank him out of the game. But the helmet slipped over his eyes as the Yellow Jackets were preparing to kickoff, so Banker tossed it to the sideline, and was never taken out, calling Bierman's bluff. Tulane went on to win 20–14.

The starting lineup was Holland (left end), McCanse (left tackle), Bodenger (left guard), Roberts (center), Upton (right guard), Rucker (right tackle), Dalrymple (right end), Baumbach (quarterback), Armstrong (left halfback), Banker (right halfback), Seeuws (fullback).

=== Georgia ===
Tulane at Georgia

Team	1	2	3	4	Total
• Tulane	7	7	7	0	21
Georgia	2	13	0	0	15

- Date: November 1
- Location: Memorial Stadium
  Columbus, GA
- Game attendance: 15,000
- Referee: Rip Major

The Green Wave defeated Georgia, conquerors of Yale, in Columbus 21–15, twice coming from behind. For the first score, end Vernon "Catfish" Smith nailed Bill Banker behind the line for a safety. After Tulane blocked a punt, Banker put in a touchdown for the lead.

Tulane's second touchdown came on a 62-yard run from Ike Armstrong. Georgia's Smith next caught a pass and went 20 yards to the goal. Georgia went ahead 15–14 after Ripper Roberts intercepted a pass and ran 60 yards for the touchdown. Tulane won on an ensuing 80-yard drive, in a 2-yard run from Banker.

The starting lineup was Holland (left end), McCanse (left tackle), Boenger (left guard), Robert (center), McCormick (right guard), Luker (right tackle), Dalrymple (right end), Baumbach (quarterback), Armstrong (left halfback), Banker (right halfback), Seeuws (fullback).

=== Auburn ===
All of the reserves got to play in the 52–0 romp over Auburn. The starting lineup was Holland (left end), McCanse (left tackle), Bodenger (left guard), Roberts (center), Upton (right guard), Rucker (right tackle), Dalrymple (right end), Baumbach (quarterback), Armstrong (left halfback), Banker (right halfback), Seeuws (fullback).

=== Sewanee ===
Tulane defeated the Sewanee Tigers 18–0. The starting lineup was Holland (left end), McCanse (left tackle), Bodenger (left guard), Roberts (center), McCormick (right guard), Rucker (right tackle), Dalrymple (right end), Baumbach (quarterback), Banker (left halfback), Armstrong (right halfback), Seeuws (fullback).

=== LSU ===
The Green Wave won 21–0 over rival LSU. The first touchdown came on a pass from backer to Armstrong. Jerry Dalrymple scored the next touchdown, snatching a pass from Armstrong and running more than half the field for a score. Preacher Roberts returned an interception for the final score.

== Postseason ==
Roberts' performance in the LSU game netted him next year's captaincy. Roberts was selected All-Southern.

Tulane won the SoCon, and was invited to the Rose Bowl.

== Players ==
=== Depth chart ===
The following chart provides a visual depiction of Tulane's lineup during the 1929 season with games started at the position reflected in parentheses. The chart mimics a single wing on offense.

LE Jack Holland (8)	LG Bodenger (8) Mangum (0)	C L. Roberts (6) C. Upton (2)	RG C. Upton (4) L. Roberts (2) J. McCormick (1)	LT Elmer McCance (8) C. DeColigny (0)	RT Charles Rucker (8)	RE Jerry Dalrymple (8) Vernon Haynes (0)
				QB Dick Baumbach (8) Red Dawson (0)			RHB Bill Banker (7) Ike Armstrong (1) Elmer Massey (0) John Whatley (0)
			FB Fred Seeuws (8) Jack Pizzano (0)
	LHB Ike Armstrong (7) Bill Banker (1) Wop Glover (0) H. Whatley (0)

=== Line ===
Number	Player	Position	Games started	Hometown
28	Maury Bodenger	guard		New Orleans
29	Jerry Dalrymple	end		Arkadelphia, Arkansas
17	Calvert DeColigny	tackle		New Orleans
14	William Drawe	end		New Orleans
9	Vernon Haynes	end		Arkansas City, Arkansas
21	Jack Holland	end		Shreveport
10	Doyle Magee	end		Franklinton
25	Mangum	guard		
30	Elmer McCance	tackle		
12	John McCormick	guard		Monroe
23	William Penney	guard		Guatemala City, C. A.
32	Lloyd Roberts	center		
33	Charles Rucker	tackle		
24	Claggert Upton	guard, center		New Orleans

=== Backfield ===
Number	Player	Position	Games started	Hometown
6	Ike Armstrong	halfback		
18	Bill Banker	halfback		Lake Charles
1	Dick Baumbach	quarterback		
4	Red Dawson	quarterback		River Falls, Wisconsin
5	Wop Glover	halfback		Bay St. Louis, Mississippi
3	George Haik	halfback		Bogalusa
22	Elmer Massey	halfback		
16	Jack Pizzano	fullback		
15	Fred Seeuws	fullback		
7	Hugh Whatley	halfback		Rayville
8	John Whatley	halfback		Rayville

=== Unlisted ===
Number	Player
11	Ford
13	Young
26	Bankston

== Bibliography ==
- Jambalaya. Tulane University. 1929.
