= 1929 Georgia Tech Yellow Jackets football team =

American college football season

1929 Georgia Tech Yellow Jackets football
- Conference: Southern Conference
- Record: 3–6 (3–5 SoCon)
- Head coach: William Alexander (10th season)
- Offensive scheme: Jump shift
- Captain: Harold Rusk
- Home stadium: Grant Field

1929 Southern Conference football standings
	Conf.					Overall
Team	W		L		T	W		L		T
No. 10 Tulane $	6	–	0	–	0	9	–	0	–	0
Tennessee	6	–	0	–	1	9	–	0	–	1
North Carolina	7	–	1	–	0	9	–	1	–	0
Florida	6	–	1	–	0	8	–	2	–	0
Vanderbilt	5	–	1	–	0	7	–	2	–	0
Kentucky	3	–	1	–	1	6	–	1	–	1
Georgia	4	–	2	–	0	6	–	4	–	0
VMI	4	–	2	–	0	8	–	2	–	0
Duke	2	–	1	–	0	4	–	6	–	0
LSU	3	–	2	–	0	6	–	3	–	0
Alabama	4	–	3	–	0	6	–	3	–	0
Clemson	3	–	3	–	0	8	–	3	–	0
VPI	2	–	3	–	0	5	–	4	–	0
Georgia Tech	3	–	5	–	0	3	–	6	–	0
South Carolina	2	–	5	–	0	6	–	5	–	0
Virginia	1	–	3	–	2	4	–	3	–	2
Maryland	1	–	3	–	1	4	–	4	–	2
Washington and Lee	1	–	4	–	1	3	–	5	–	1
Ole Miss	0	–	4	–	2	1	–	6	–	2
Mississippi A&M	0	–	3	–	1	1	–	5	–	2
Sewanee	0	–	4	–	1	2	–	5	–	2
NC State	0	–	5	–	0	1	–	8	–	0
Auburn	0	–	7	–	0	2	–	7	–	0
$ – Conference champion; Rankings from Dickinson System

The 1929 Georgia Tech Yellow Jackets football team represented the Georgia Tech Yellow Jackets of the Georgia Institute of Technology during the 1929 college football season. The Tornado was coached by William Alexander in his tenth year as head coach and compiled a record of 3–6.

== Schedule ==
Date	Opponent	Site	Result	Attendance	Source
October 5	Mississippi A&M	Grant Field; Atlanta, GA	W 27–13	12,000	
October 12	North Carolina	Grant Field; Atlanta, GA	L 7–18	25,000	
October 19	Florida	Grant Field; Atlanta, GA	W 19–6	7,000	
October 26	at Tulane	Tulane Stadium; New Orleans, LA	L 14–20	25,000	
November 2	Notre Dame*	Grant Field; Atlanta, GA (rivalry)	L 6–26	22,000	
November 9	at Vanderbilt	Dudley Field; Nashville, TN (rivalry)	L 7–23		
November 16	Alabama	Grant Field; Atlanta, GA (rivalry)	L 0–14	20,000	
November 28	Auburn	Grant Field; Atlanta, GA (rivalry)	W 19–6		
December 7	at Georgia	Sanford Stadium; Athens, GA (rivalry)	L 6–12	25,000	
*Non-conference game
