= 1929 Tennessee Volunteers football team =

American college football season

1929 Tennessee Volunteers football
- Conference: Southern Conference
- Record: 9–0–1 (6–0–1 SoCon)
- Head coach: Robert Neyland (4th season)
- Offensive scheme: Single-wing
- Captain: Howard Johnson
- Home stadium: Shields–Watkins Field

1929 Southern Conference football standings
	Conf.					Overall
Team	W		L		T	W		L		T
No. 10 Tulane $	6	–	0	–	0	9	–	0	–	0
Tennessee	6	–	0	–	1	9	–	0	–	1
North Carolina	7	–	1	–	0	9	–	1	–	0
Florida	6	–	1	–	0	8	–	2	–	0
Vanderbilt	5	–	1	–	0	7	–	2	–	0
Kentucky	3	–	1	–	1	6	–	1	–	1
Georgia	4	–	2	–	0	6	–	4	–	0
VMI	4	–	2	–	0	8	–	2	–	0
Duke	2	–	1	–	0	4	–	6	–	0
LSU	3	–	2	–	0	6	–	3	–	0
Alabama	4	–	3	–	0	6	–	3	–	0
Clemson	3	–	3	–	0	8	–	3	–	0
VPI	2	–	3	–	0	5	–	4	–	0
Georgia Tech	3	–	5	–	0	3	–	6	–	0
South Carolina	2	–	5	–	0	6	–	5	–	0
Virginia	1	–	3	–	2	4	–	3	–	2
Maryland	1	–	3	–	1	4	–	4	–	2
Washington and Lee	1	–	4	–	1	3	–	5	–	1
Ole Miss	0	–	4	–	2	1	–	6	–	2
Mississippi A&M	0	–	3	–	1	1	–	5	–	2
Sewanee	0	–	4	–	1	2	–	5	–	2
NC State	0	–	5	–	0	1	–	8	–	0
Auburn	0	–	7	–	0	2	–	7	–	0
$ – Conference champion; Rankings from Dickinson System

The 1929 Tennessee Volunteers football team (variously "Tennessee", "UT" or the "Vols") represented the University of Tennessee in the 1929 college football season. Playing as a member of the Southern Conference (SoCon), the team was led by head coach Robert Neyland, in his fourth year, and played their home games at Shields–Watkins Field in Knoxville, Tennessee. The 1928 Vols won nine, lost zero and tied one game (9–0–1 overall, 6–0–1 in the SoCon). In a virtual repeat of the previous year, a tie with Kentucky spoiled Tennessee's perfect season. Playing eight home games, the Volunteers outscored their opponents 330 to 13 and posted eight shutouts.

== Schedule ==
Date	Opponent	Site	Result	Attendance	Source
September 28	Centre*	Shields–Watkins Field; Knoxville, TN	W 40–6	8,000	
October 5	at Chattanooga*	Chamberlain Field; Chattanooga, TN	W 20–0	10,000	
October 12	Ole Miss	Shields–Watkins Field; Knoxville, TN (rivalry)	W 52–7		
October 19	Alabama^{†}	Shields–Watkins Field; Knoxville, TN (rivalry)	W 6–0	20,000	
October 26	at Washington and Lee	Maher Field; Roanoke, VA	W 39–0		
November 2	Auburn	Shields–Watkins Field; Knoxville, TN (rivalry)	W 27–0		
November 9	Carson–Newman*	Shields–Watkins Field; Knoxville, TN	W 73–0		
November 16	Vanderbilt	Shields–Watkins Field; Knoxville, TN (rivalry)	W 13–0		
November 28	at Kentucky	Stoll Field; Lexington, KY (rivalry)	T 6–6	20,000	
December 7	South Carolina	Shields–Watkins Field; Knoxville, TN (rivalry)	W 54–0	10,000	
*Non-conference game; ^{†}Homecoming

== Players ==
=== Line ===
Number	Player	Position	Games started	Hometown	Prep school	Height	Weight	Age
29	L. Philip Beene	tackle						
31	Fritz Brandt	end		Erwin, Tennessee				
30	Herbert Brown	guard						
33	James Clemmer	end						
55	Oscar Derryberry	tackle						
37	Jim Finney	center						
21	Ben Fuller	guard						
39	Houston Herndon	end						
45	Herman Hickman	guard		Johnson City, Tennessee	Baylor School	5'10"	225	
25	Laird Holt	end						
26	Paul Hug	end			Kingsport High		172	
56	Bowen Hughes	guard						
35	Bo Hundley	tackle						
13	Howard Johnson	tackle						
22	James G. Johnston	tackle						
20	Eugene S. Mayer	tackle						
47	David K. Mitchell	center						
23	Louis Roberts	center						
42	Ray Saunders	tackle				6'0"	184	
54	Charles Talbot	end						
34	Conrad Templeton	guard						
24	Harry Thayer	guard						

=== Backfield ===
Number	Player	Position	Games started	Hometown	Prep school	Height	Weight	Age
14	John Allen	halfback						
52	Edwin Corbett	halfback						
40	William G. Cox	fullback						
13	Quinn Decker	fullback						
16	Theodore Disney	halfback						
17	Bobby Dodd	quarterback		Kingsport, Tennessee	Kingsport High	6'1"	170	
12	Hugh Faust	quarterback						
44	Charles Gillespie	halfback						
15	Buddy Hackman	halfback		Nashville, Tennessee	Hume-Fogg High	5'11"	175	
27	Paul D. Heydrick	halfback						
18	Charles Kohlhase	fullback						
44	Pal McAdams	halfback						
28	Gene McEver	halfback		Bristol, Virginia	Bristol High	5'10"	185	
46	Oliver McKeehan	fullback						
38	Charles Reineke	quarterback						
32	James Whitaker	halfback						
