= 1929 LSU Tigers football team =

American college football season

1929 LSU Tigers football
- Conference: Southern Conference
- Record: 6–3 (3–2 SoCon)
- Head coach: Russ Cohen (2nd season)
- MVP: Dobie Reeves
- Home stadium: Tiger Stadium

1929 Southern Conference football standings
	Conf.					Overall
Team	W		L		T	W		L		T
No. 10 Tulane $	6	–	0	–	0	9	–	0	–	0
Tennessee	6	–	0	–	1	9	–	0	–	1
North Carolina	7	–	1	–	0	9	–	1	–	0
Florida	6	–	1	–	0	8	–	2	–	0
Vanderbilt	5	–	1	–	0	7	–	2	–	0
Kentucky	3	–	1	–	1	6	–	1	–	1
Georgia	4	–	2	–	0	6	–	4	–	0
VMI	4	–	2	–	0	8	–	2	–	0
Duke	2	–	1	–	0	4	–	6	–	0
LSU	3	–	2	–	0	6	–	3	–	0
Alabama	4	–	3	–	0	6	–	3	–	0
Clemson	3	–	3	–	0	8	–	3	–	0
VPI	2	–	3	–	0	5	–	4	–	0
Georgia Tech	3	–	5	–	0	3	–	6	–	0
South Carolina	2	–	5	–	0	6	–	5	–	0
Virginia	1	–	3	–	2	4	–	3	–	2
Maryland	1	–	3	–	1	4	–	4	–	2
Washington and Lee	1	–	4	–	1	3	–	5	–	1
Ole Miss	0	–	4	–	2	1	–	6	–	2
Mississippi A&M	0	–	3	–	1	1	–	5	–	2
Sewanee	0	–	4	–	1	2	–	5	–	2
NC State	0	–	5	–	0	1	–	8	–	0
Auburn	0	–	7	–	0	2	–	7	–	0
$ – Conference champion; Rankings from Dickinson System

The 1929 LSU Tigers football team was an American football team that represented Louisiana State University (LSU) as a member of the Southern Conference during the 1929 college football season. In their second season under head coach Russ Cohen, LSU compiled a 6–3 record.

== Schedule ==
Date	Opponent	Site	Result	Attendance	Source
September 28	Louisiana College*	Tiger Stadium; Baton Rouge, LA	W 58–0		
October 5	Southwestern Louisiana*	Tiger Stadium; Baton Rouge, LA	W 58–0		
October 12	Sewanee^{†}	Tiger Stadium; Baton Rouge, LA	W 27–14	7,000	
October 19	at Mississippi A&M	Municipal Stadium; Jackson, MS (rivalry)	W 31–6		
October 25	Louisiana Tech*	Tiger Stadium; Baton Rouge, LA	W 53–7		
November 2	vs. Arkansas*	State Fair Stadium; Shreveport, LA (rivalry)	L 0–32	10,000	
November 9	at Duke	Duke Stadium; Durham, NC	L 6–32		
November 16	Ole Miss	Tiger Stadium; Baton Rouge, LA (rivalry)	W 13–6	5,000	
November 28	Tulane	Tiger Stadium; Baton Rouge, LA (Battle for the Rag)	L 0–21	23,000	
*Non-conference game; ^{†}Homecoming
