= 1929 Mississippi A&M Aggies football team =

American college football season

1929 Mississippi A&M Aggies football
- Conference: Southern Conference
- Record: 1–5–2 (0–3–1 SoCon)
- Head coach: John W. Hancock (3rd season)
- Captain: William A. Pappenheimer
- Home stadium: Scott Field; Municipal Stadium

1929 Southern Conference football standings
	Conf.					Overall
Team	W		L		T	W		L		T
No. 10 Tulane $	6	–	0	–	0	9	–	0	–	0
Tennessee	6	–	0	–	1	9	–	0	–	1
North Carolina	7	–	1	–	0	9	–	1	–	0
Florida	6	–	1	–	0	8	–	2	–	0
Vanderbilt	5	–	1	–	0	7	–	2	–	0
Kentucky	3	–	1	–	1	6	–	1	–	1
Georgia	4	–	2	–	0	6	–	4	–	0
VMI	4	–	2	–	0	8	–	2	–	0
Duke	2	–	1	–	0	4	–	6	–	0
LSU	3	–	2	–	0	6	–	3	–	0
Alabama	4	–	3	–	0	6	–	3	–	0
Clemson	3	–	3	–	0	8	–	3	–	0
VPI	2	–	3	–	0	5	–	4	–	0
Georgia Tech	3	–	5	–	0	3	–	6	–	0
South Carolina	2	–	5	–	0	6	–	5	–	0
Virginia	1	–	3	–	2	4	–	3	–	2
Maryland	1	–	3	–	1	4	–	4	–	2
Washington and Lee	1	–	4	–	1	3	–	5	–	1
Ole Miss	0	–	4	–	2	1	–	6	–	2
Mississippi A&M	0	–	3	–	1	1	–	5	–	2
Sewanee	0	–	4	–	1	2	–	5	–	2
NC State	0	–	5	–	0	1	–	8	–	0
Auburn	0	–	7	–	0	2	–	7	–	0
$ – Conference champion; Rankings from Dickinson System

The 1929 Mississippi A&M Aggies football team was an American football team that represented the Agricultural and Mechanical College of the State of Mississippi (now known as Mississippi State University) as a member of the Southern Conference (SoCon) during the 1929 college football season. In their third season under head coach John W. Hancock, Mississippi A&M compiled a 1–5–2 record.

== Schedule ==
Date	Opponent	Site	Result	Attendance	Source
September 27	Henderson-Brown*	Scott Field; Starkville, MS	L 0–7		
October 5	at Georgia Tech	Grant Field; Atlanta, GA	L 13–27	12,000	
October 12	at Tulane	Tulane Stadium; New Orleans, LA	L 0–34		
October 19	LSU	Municipal Stadium; Jackson, MS (rivalry)	L 6–31		
November 2	Mississippi College*	Scott Field; Starkville, MS	W 6–0		
November 9	Michigan State*	Municipal Stadium; Jackson, MS	L 19–33	< 2,000	
November 16	Millsaps*	Scott Field; Starkville, MS	T 0–0		
November 28	at Ole Miss	Hemingway Stadium; Oxford, MS (Egg Bowl)	T 7–7	12,000	
*Non-conference game
