= 1929 Kentucky Wildcats football team =

American college football season

1929 Kentucky Wildcats football
- Conference: Southern Conference
- Record: 6–1–1 (3–1–1 SoCon)
- Head coach: Harry Gamage (3rd season)
- Captain: Ed Covington
- Home stadium: Stoll Field

1929 Southern Conference football standings
	Conf.					Overall
Team	W		L		T	W		L		T
No. 10 Tulane $	6	–	0	–	0	9	–	0	–	0
Tennessee	6	–	0	–	1	9	–	0	–	1
North Carolina	7	–	1	–	0	9	–	1	–	0
Florida	6	–	1	–	0	8	–	2	–	0
Vanderbilt	5	–	1	–	0	7	–	2	–	0
Kentucky	3	–	1	–	1	6	–	1	–	1
Georgia	4	–	2	–	0	6	–	4	–	0
VMI	4	–	2	–	0	8	–	2	–	0
Duke	2	–	1	–	0	4	–	6	–	0
LSU	3	–	2	–	0	6	–	3	–	0
Alabama	4	–	3	–	0	6	–	3	–	0
Clemson	3	–	3	–	0	8	–	3	–	0
VPI	2	–	3	–	0	5	–	4	–	0
Georgia Tech	3	–	5	–	0	3	–	6	–	0
South Carolina	2	–	5	–	0	6	–	5	–	0
Virginia	1	–	3	–	2	4	–	3	–	2
Maryland	1	–	3	–	1	4	–	4	–	2
Washington and Lee	1	–	4	–	1	3	–	5	–	1
Ole Miss	0	–	4	–	2	1	–	6	–	2
Mississippi A&M	0	–	3	–	1	1	–	5	–	2
Sewanee	0	–	4	–	1	2	–	5	–	2
NC State	0	–	5	–	0	1	–	8	–	0
Auburn	0	–	7	–	0	2	–	7	–	0
$ – Conference champion; Rankings from Dickinson System

The 1929 Kentucky Wildcats football team represented the University of Kentucky as a member of the Southern Conference (SoCon) during the 1929 college football season. Led by third-year head coach Harry Gamage, the Wildcats compiled an overall record of 6–1–1 with a mark of 3–1–1 in conference play, placing sixth in the SoCon.

== Schedule ==
Date	Opponent	Site	Result	Attendance	Source
October 5	Maryville (TN)*	Stoll Field; Lexington, KY	W 40–0	8,000	
October 14	Washington and Lee	Stoll Field; Lexington, KY	W 20–6		
October 19	Carson–Newman*	Stoll Field; Lexington, KY	W 58–0		
October 26	at Centre*	Cheek Field; Danville, KY (rivalry)	W 33–0		
November 2	Clemson	Stoll Field; Lexington, KY	W 44–6		
November 9	at Alabama	Cramton Bowl; Montgomery, AL	L 13–24	8,000	
November 16	at VMI	Alumni Field; Lexington, VA	W 23–12		
November 28	Tennessee	Stoll Field; Lexington, KY (rivalry)	T 6–6	20,000	
*Non-conference game
