= 1929 Duke Blue Devils football team =

American college football season

1929 Duke Blue Devils football
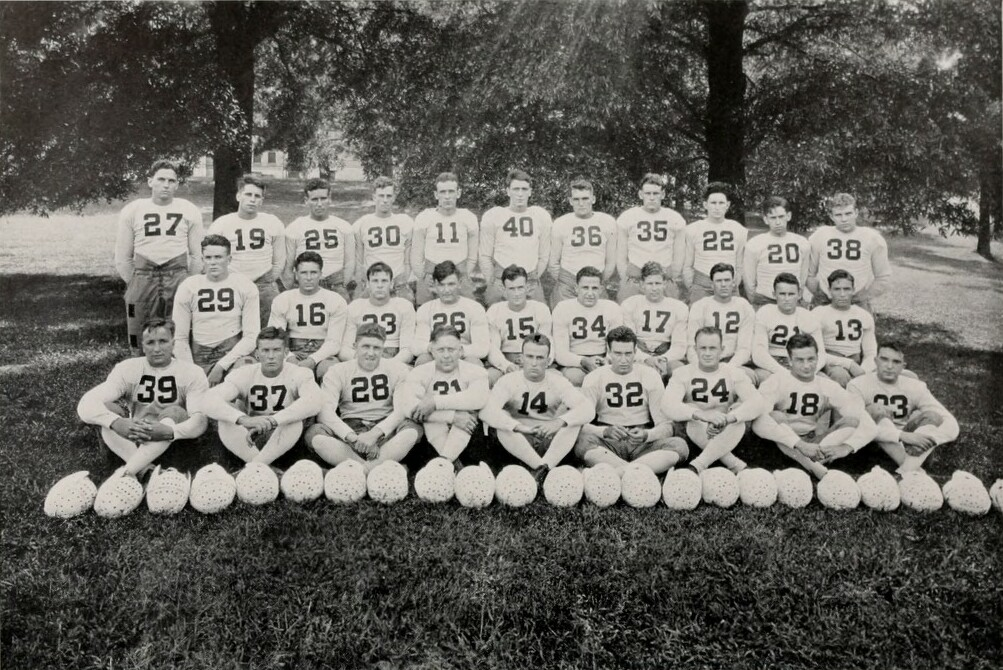
- Conference: Southern Conference
- Record: 4–6 (2–1 SoCon)
- Head coach: Jimmy DeHart (4th season)
- Captain: Henry Kistler
- Home stadium: Duke Stadium

1929 Southern Conference football standings
| | Conf. | | | | | Overall |
| Team | W | | L | | T | W | | L | | T |
|---|---|---|---|---|---|---|---|---|---|---|
| No. 10 Tulane $ | 6 | – | 0 | – | 0 | 9 | – | 0 | – | 0 |
| Tennessee | 6 | – | 0 | – | 1 | 9 | – | 0 | – | 1 |
| North Carolina | 7 | – | 1 | – | 0 | 9 | – | 1 | – | 0 |
| Florida | 6 | – | 1 | – | 0 | 8 | – | 2 | – | 0 |
| Vanderbilt | 5 | – | 1 | – | 0 | 7 | – | 2 | – | 0 |
| Kentucky | 3 | – | 1 | – | 1 | 6 | – | 1 | – | 1 |
| Georgia | 4 | – | 2 | – | 0 | 6 | – | 4 | – | 0 |
| VMI | 4 | – | 2 | – | 0 | 8 | – | 2 | – | 0 |
| Duke | 2 | – | 1 | – | 0 | 4 | – | 6 | – | 0 |
| LSU | 3 | – | 2 | – | 0 | 6 | – | 3 | – | 0 |
| Alabama | 4 | – | 3 | – | 0 | 6 | – | 3 | – | 0 |
| Clemson | 3 | – | 3 | – | 0 | 8 | – | 3 | – | 0 |
| VPI | 2 | – | 3 | – | 0 | 5 | – | 4 | – | 0 |
| Georgia Tech | 3 | – | 5 | – | 0 | 3 | – | 6 | – | 0 |
| South Carolina | 2 | – | 5 | – | 0 | 6 | – | 5 | – | 0 |
| Virginia | 1 | – | 3 | – | 2 | 4 | – | 3 | – | 2 |
| Maryland | 1 | – | 3 | – | 1 | 4 | – | 4 | – | 2 |
| Washington and Lee | 1 | – | 4 | – | 1 | 3 | – | 5 | – | 1 |
| Ole Miss | 0 | – | 4 | – | 2 | 1 | – | 6 | – | 2 |
| Mississippi A&M | 0 | – | 3 | – | 1 | 1 | – | 5 | – | 2 |
| Sewanee | 0 | – | 4 | – | 1 | 2 | – | 5 | – | 2 |
| NC State | 0 | – | 5 | – | 0 | 1 | – | 8 | – | 0 |
| Auburn | 0 | – | 7 | – | 0 | 2 | – | 7 | – | 0 |
$ – Conference champion; Rankings from Dickinson System

The 1929 Duke Blue Devils football team was an American football team that represented Duke University as a member of the Southern Conference during the 1929 college football season. In its fourth season under head coach Jimmy DeHart, the team compiled a 4–6 record (2–1 against conference opponents) and was outscored by a total of 260 to 153. Henry Kistler was the team captain.

Home games were played at the new Duke Stadium, on its campus in Durham, North Carolina.

== Schedule ==
| Date | Time | Opponent | Site | Result | Attendance | Source |
|---|---|---|---|---|---|---|
| September 28 | | at Mercer | Centennial Stadium; Macon, GA | W 19–6 | | |
| October 5 | | Pittsburgh^{†} | Duke Stadium; Durham, NC | L 7–52 | 20,000 | |
| October 19 | | at Navy | Thompson Stadium; Annapolis, MD | L 13–45 | | |
| October 26 | | at Villanova | Villanova Stadium; Villanova, PA | L 12–58 | | |
| November 2 | 2:00 p.m. | at Boston College | Fenway Park; Boston, MA | L 12–20 | | |
| November 9 | | LSU | Duke Stadium; Durham, NC | W 32–6 | | |
| November 16 | | NC State | Duke Stadium; Durham, NC (rivalry) | W 19–12 | | |
| November 23 | | Wake Forest | Duke Stadium; Durham, NC (rivalry) | W 20–0 | 750 | |
| November 30 | | at Davidson | Richardson Field; Davidson, NC | L 12–13 | | |
| December 7 | | North Carolina | Duke Stadium; Durham, NC (rivalry) | L 7–48 | 13,000 | |
^{†}Homecoming
