= 1929 Vanderbilt Commodores football team =

American college football season

1929 Vanderbilt Commodores football
- Conference: Southern Conference
- Record: 7–2 (5–1 SoCon)
- Head coach: Dan McGugin (25th season)
- Captain: Bull Brown
- Home stadium: Dudley Field

1929 Southern Conference football standings
	Conf.					Overall
Team	W		L		T	W		L		T
No. 10 Tulane $	6	–	0	–	0	9	–	0	–	0
Tennessee	6	–	0	–	1	9	–	0	–	1
North Carolina	7	–	1	–	0	9	–	1	–	0
Florida	6	–	1	–	0	8	–	2	–	0
Vanderbilt	5	–	1	–	0	7	–	2	–	0
Kentucky	3	–	1	–	1	6	–	1	–	1
Georgia	4	–	2	–	0	6	–	4	–	0
VMI	4	–	2	–	0	8	–	2	–	0
Duke	2	–	1	–	0	4	–	6	–	0
LSU	3	–	2	–	0	6	–	3	–	0
Alabama	4	–	3	–	0	6	–	3	–	0
Clemson	3	–	3	–	0	8	–	3	–	0
VPI	2	–	3	–	0	5	–	4	–	0
Georgia Tech	3	–	5	–	0	3	–	6	–	0
South Carolina	2	–	5	–	0	6	–	5	–	0
Virginia	1	–	3	–	2	4	–	3	–	2
Maryland	1	–	3	–	1	4	–	4	–	2
Washington and Lee	1	–	4	–	1	3	–	5	–	1
Ole Miss	0	–	4	–	2	1	–	6	–	2
Mississippi A&M	0	–	3	–	1	1	–	5	–	2
Sewanee	0	–	4	–	1	2	–	5	–	2
NC State	0	–	5	–	0	1	–	8	–	0
Auburn	0	–	7	–	0	2	–	7	–	0
$ – Conference champion; Rankings from Dickinson System

The 1929 Vanderbilt Commodores football team was an American football team that represented Vanderbilt University as a member of the Southern Conference during the 1929 college football season. In their 25th season under head coach Dan McGugin, Vanderbilt compiled a 7–2 record.

== Schedule ==
Date	Opponent	Site	Result	Attendance	Source
September 28	Ole Miss	Dudley Field; Nashville, TN (rivalry)	W 19–7		
October 5	Ouachita Baptist*	Dudley Field; Nashville, TN	W 26–6		
October 12	at Minnesota*	Memorial Stadium; Minneapolis, MN	L 6–15	25,000	
October 19	at Auburn	Legion Field; Birmingham, AL	W 41–2		
October 26	Maryville (TN)	Dudley Field; Nashville, TN	W 33–0		
November 2	Alabama	Dudley Field; Nashville, TN	W 13–0	15,000	
November 9	Georgia Tech	Dudley Field; Nashville, TN (rivalry)	W 23–7		
November 16	at Tennessee	Shields–Watkins Field; Knoxville, TN (rivalry)	L 0–13		
November 28	Sewanee	Dudley Field; Nashville, TN (rivalry)	W 26–6		
*Non-conference game
