= 1929 Georgia Bulldogs football team =

American college football season

1929 Georgia Bulldogs football
- Conference: Southern Conference
- Record: 6–4 (4–2 SoCon)
- Head coach: Harry Mehre (2nd season)
- Offensive scheme: Notre Dame Box
- Captain: Ike Boland
- Home stadium: Sanford Stadium (30,000)

1929 Southern Conference football standings
	Conf.					Overall
Team	W		L		T	W		L		T
No. 10 Tulane $	6	–	0	–	0	9	–	0	–	0
Tennessee	6	–	0	–	1	9	–	0	–	1
North Carolina	7	–	1	–	0	9	–	1	–	0
Florida	6	–	1	–	0	8	–	2	–	0
Vanderbilt	5	–	1	–	0	7	–	2	–	0
Kentucky	3	–	1	–	1	6	–	1	–	1
Georgia	4	–	2	–	0	6	–	4	–	0
VMI	4	–	2	–	0	8	–	2	–	0
Duke	2	–	1	–	0	4	–	6	–	0
LSU	3	–	2	–	0	6	–	3	–	0
Alabama	4	–	3	–	0	6	–	3	–	0
Clemson	3	–	3	–	0	8	–	3	–	0
VPI	2	–	3	–	0	5	–	4	–	0
Georgia Tech	3	–	5	–	0	3	–	6	–	0
South Carolina	2	–	5	–	0	6	–	5	–	0
Virginia	1	–	3	–	2	4	–	3	–	2
Maryland	1	–	3	–	1	4	–	4	–	2
Washington and Lee	1	–	4	–	1	3	–	5	–	1
Ole Miss	0	–	4	–	2	1	–	6	–	2
Mississippi A&M	0	–	3	–	1	1	–	5	–	2
Sewanee	0	–	4	–	1	2	–	5	–	2
NC State	0	–	5	–	0	1	–	8	–	0
Auburn	0	–	7	–	0	2	–	7	–	0
$ – Conference champion; Rankings from Dickinson System

The 1929 Georgia Bulldogs football team represented the University of Georgia during the 1929 college football season. The Bulldogs completed the season with a 6–4 record. The season featured the first game in newly completed Sanford Stadium on October 12 (a victory over Yale) and Georgia's 100th loss (November 2 vs. Tulane). In the 1920s, the Bulldogs compiled a record of 60–31–4 (a .653 winning percentage).

== Schedule ==
Date	Opponent	Site	Result	Attendance	Source
September 28	Oglethorpe*	Sanford Field; Athens, GA	L 6–13		
October 5	Furman*	Sanford Field; Athens, GA	W 27–0		
October 12	Yale*	Sanford Stadium; Athens, GA	W 15–0	30,000–35,000	
October 19	at North Carolina	Kenan Memorial Stadium; Chapel Hill, NC	W 19–12	24,000	
October 26	vs. Florida	Fairfield Stadium; Jacksonville, FL (rivalry)	L 6–18	20,000	
November 1	vs. Tulane	Memorial Stadium; Columbus, GA	L 15–21	15,000	
November 9	at NYU*	Yankee Stadium; Bronx, NY	L 19–27	42,000	
November 15	Auburn^{†}	Sanford Stadium; Athens, GA (rivalry)	W 24–0	> 3,000	
November 28	at Alabama	Legion Field; Birmingham, AL (rivalry)	W 12–0	20,448	
December 7	Georgia Tech	Sanford Stadium; Athens, GA (rivalry)	W 13–0	25,000	
*Non-conference game; ^{†}Homecoming
