= 1929 Clemson Tigers football team =

American college football season

1929 Clemson Tigers football
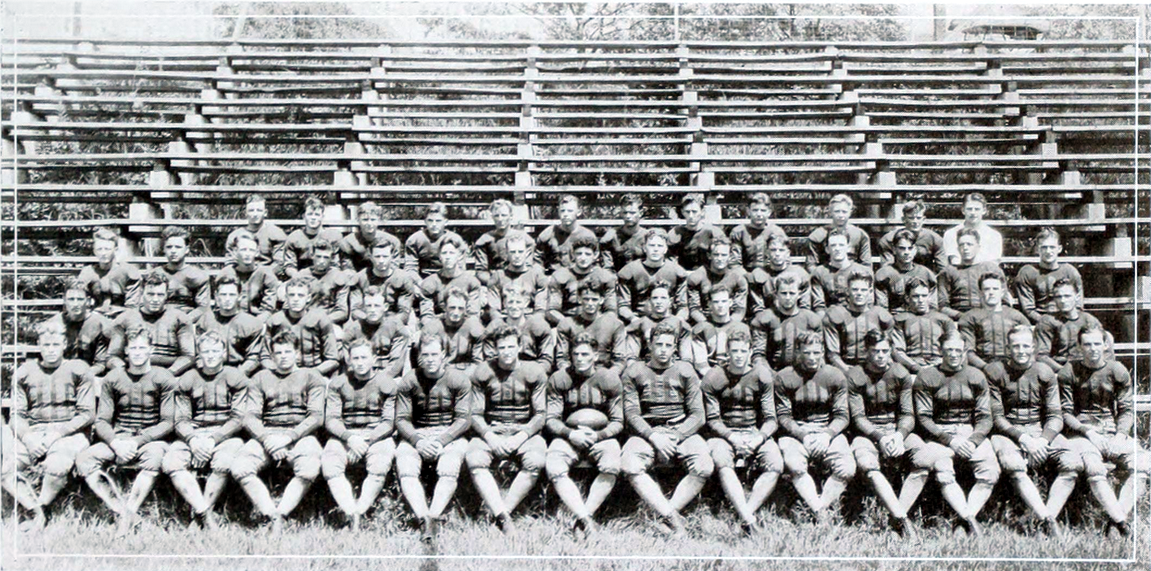
- Conference: Southern Conference
- Record: 8–3 (3–3 SoCon)
- Head coach: Josh Cody (3rd season)
- Captain: O. D. Padgett
- Home stadium: Riggs Field

1929 Southern Conference football standings
	Conf.					Overall
Team	W		L		T	W		L		T
No. 10 Tulane $	6	–	0	–	0	9	–	0	–	0
Tennessee	6	–	0	–	1	9	–	0	–	1
North Carolina	7	–	1	–	0	9	–	1	–	0
Florida	6	–	1	–	0	8	–	2	–	0
Vanderbilt	5	–	1	–	0	7	–	2	–	0
Kentucky	3	–	1	–	1	6	–	1	–	1
Georgia	4	–	2	–	0	6	–	4	–	0
VMI	4	–	2	–	0	8	–	2	–	0
Duke	2	–	1	–	0	4	–	6	–	0
LSU	3	–	2	–	0	6	–	3	–	0
Alabama	4	–	3	–	0	6	–	3	–	0
Clemson	3	–	3	–	0	8	–	3	–	0
VPI	2	–	3	–	0	5	–	4	–	0
Georgia Tech	3	–	5	–	0	3	–	6	–	0
South Carolina	2	–	5	–	0	6	–	5	–	0
Virginia	1	–	3	–	2	4	–	3	–	2
Maryland	1	–	3	–	1	4	–	4	–	2
Washington and Lee	1	–	4	–	1	3	–	5	–	1
Ole Miss	0	–	4	–	2	1	–	6	–	2
Mississippi A&M	0	–	3	–	1	1	–	5	–	2
Sewanee	0	–	4	–	1	2	–	5	–	2
NC State	0	–	5	–	0	1	–	8	–	0
Auburn	0	–	7	–	0	2	–	7	–	0
$ – Conference champion; Rankings from Dickinson System

The 1929 Clemson Tigers football team represented Clemson College—now known as Clemson University—as a member of the Southern Conference (SoCon) during the 1929 college football season. Led by second-year head coach Josh Cody, the Tigers compiled an overall record of 8–3 with a mark of 3–2 in conference play, plaching 12th in the SoCon.

== Schedule ==
Date	Opponent	Site	Result	Source
September 21	Newberry*	Riggs Field; Calhoun, SC	W 68–0	
September 28	vs. Davidson*	Central H.S. Stadium; Charlotte, NC	W 32–14	
October 5	Auburn	Riggs Field; Calhoun, SC (rivalry)	W 26–7	
October 11	vs. NC State	Pee Dee Fairgrounds; Florence, SC (rivalry)	W 26–0	
October 18	at Wofford*	Snyder Field; Spartanburg, SC	W 30–0	
October 24	at South Carolina	State Fairgrounds; Columbia, SC (rivalry)	W 21–14	
November 2	at Kentucky	Stoll Field; Lexington, KY	L 6–44	
November 9	vs. VMI	League Park; Norfolk, VA	L 0–12	
November 16	at Florida	Fleming Field; Gainesville, FL	L 7–13	
November 23	The Citadel*	Riggs Field; Calhoun, SC	W 13–0	
November 28	Furman*	Riggs Field; Calhoun, SC	W 7–6	
*Non-conference game
