= 1929 NC State Wolfpack football team =

American college football season

1929 NC State Wolfpack football
- Conference: Southern Conference
- Record: 1–8 (0–5 SoCon)
- Head coach: Gus Tebell (5th season)
- Home stadium: Riddick Stadium

1929 Southern Conference football standings
	Conf.					Overall
Team	W		L		T	W		L		T
No. 10 Tulane $	6	–	0	–	0	9	–	0	–	0
Tennessee	6	–	0	–	1	9	–	0	–	1
North Carolina	7	–	1	–	0	9	–	1	–	0
Florida	6	–	1	–	0	8	–	2	–	0
Vanderbilt	5	–	1	–	0	7	–	2	–	0
Kentucky	3	–	1	–	1	6	–	1	–	1
Georgia	4	–	2	–	0	6	–	4	–	0
VMI	4	–	2	–	0	8	–	2	–	0
Duke	2	–	1	–	0	4	–	6	–	0
LSU	3	–	2	–	0	6	–	3	–	0
Alabama	4	–	3	–	0	6	–	3	–	0
Clemson	3	–	3	–	0	8	–	3	–	0
VPI	2	–	3	–	0	5	–	4	–	0
Georgia Tech	3	–	5	–	0	3	–	6	–	0
South Carolina	2	–	5	–	0	6	–	5	–	0
Virginia	1	–	3	–	2	4	–	3	–	2
Maryland	1	–	3	–	1	4	–	4	–	2
Washington and Lee	1	–	4	–	1	3	–	5	–	1
Ole Miss	0	–	4	–	2	1	–	6	–	2
Mississippi A&M	0	–	3	–	1	1	–	5	–	2
Sewanee	0	–	4	–	1	2	–	5	–	2
NC State	0	–	5	–	0	1	–	8	–	0
Auburn	0	–	7	–	0	2	–	7	–	0
$ – Conference champion; Rankings from Dickinson System

The 1929 NC State Wolfpack football team was an American football team that represented North Carolina State University as a member of the Southern Conference (SoCon) during the 1929 college football season. In its fifth and final season under head coach Gus Tebell, the team compiled a 2–8 record (1–5 against SoCon opponents), finished in 22nd place in the conference, and was outscored by a total of 207 to 44.

== Schedule ==
Date	Opponent	Site	Result	Source
October 4	Washington & Lee	Riddick Stadium; Raleigh, NC	L 6–27	
October 11	vs. Clemson	Pee Dee Fairgrounds; Florence, SC (rivalry)	L 0–26	
October 17	Wake Forest*	Riddick Stadium; Raleigh, NC (rivalry)	W 8–6	
October 26	at Michigan State*	College Field; East Lansing, MI	L 6–40	
November 2	at North Carolina	Kenan Memorial Stadium; Chapel Hill, NC (rivalry)	L 0–32	
November 9	Davidson*	Riddick Stadium; Raleigh, NC	L 0–13	
November 16	at Duke	Duke Stadium; Durham, NC (rivalry)	L 12–19	
November 23	at Villanova*	Franklin Field; Philadelphia, PA	L 6–24	
November 30	South Carolina	Riddick Stadium; Raleigh, NC	L 6–20	
*Non-conference game
