= 1929 Florida Gators football team =

American college football season

1929 Florida Gators football
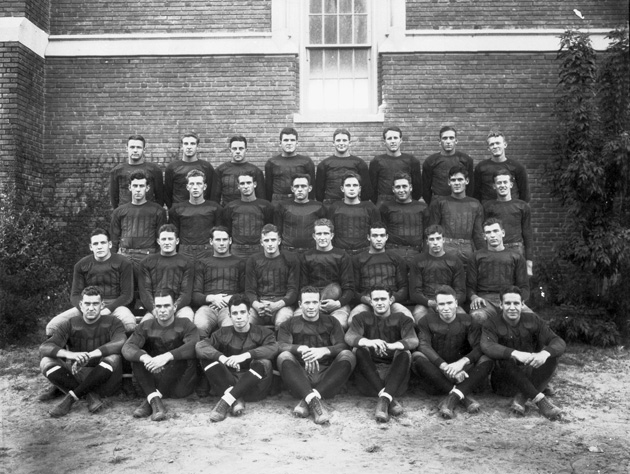
- Conference: Southern Conference
- Record: 8–2 (6–1 SoCon)
- Head coach: Charlie Bachman (2nd season)
- Offensive scheme: Notre Dame Box
- Captain: Rainey Cawthon
- Home stadium: Fleming Field

Uniform
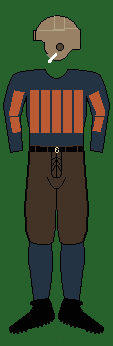

1929 Southern Conference football standings
	Conf.					Overall
Team	W		L		T	W		L		T
No. 10 Tulane $	6	–	0	–	0	9	–	0	–	0
Tennessee	6	–	0	–	1	9	–	0	–	1
North Carolina	7	–	1	–	0	9	–	1	–	0
Florida	6	–	1	–	0	8	–	2	–	0
Vanderbilt	5	–	1	–	0	7	–	2	–	0
Kentucky	3	–	1	–	1	6	–	1	–	1
Georgia	4	–	2	–	0	6	–	4	–	0
VMI	4	–	2	–	0	8	–	2	–	0
Duke	2	–	1	–	0	4	–	6	–	0
LSU	3	–	2	–	0	6	–	3	–	0
Alabama	4	–	3	–	0	6	–	3	–	0
Clemson	3	–	3	–	0	8	–	3	–	0
VPI	2	–	3	–	0	5	–	4	–	0
Georgia Tech	3	–	5	–	0	3	–	6	–	0
South Carolina	2	–	5	–	0	6	–	5	–	0
Virginia	1	–	3	–	2	4	–	3	–	2
Maryland	1	–	3	–	1	4	–	4	–	2
Washington and Lee	1	–	4	–	1	3	–	5	–	1
Ole Miss	0	–	4	–	2	1	–	6	–	2
Mississippi A&M	0	–	3	–	1	1	–	5	–	2
Sewanee	0	–	4	–	1	2	–	5	–	2
NC State	0	–	5	–	0	1	–	8	–	0
Auburn	0	–	7	–	0	2	–	7	–	0
$ – Conference champion; Rankings from Dickinson System

The 1929 Florida Gators football team represented the University of Florida during the 1929 college football season. The season was Charlie Bachman's second as the head coach of the Florida Gators football team. Bachman's 1929 Florida Gators finished with an overall record of 8–2, and a conference record of 6–1, placing fourth of twenty-three conference teams.

The highlights of the year included Southern Conference victories over the Virginia Military Institute Keydets, Auburn Tigers, Georgia Bulldogs, Clemson Tigers, South Carolina Gamecocks and Washington & Lee Generals, and a 20–6 intersectional upset over coach John McEwan's Oregon Webfoots in a neutral site game played at the old Madison Square Garden stadium in Miami, Florida.

== Before the season ==
Former player Edgar Jones became athletic director and Joe Bedenk left. James Van Fleet returned to help assist Bachman.

Coach Bachman began the season's intensive practices on the beach at Anastasia Island, about ten miles from Saint Augustine. A fierce battle amongst the eleven running backs featured. A good backfield was expected.

Bachman later said the 1929 team "was as good as the 1928 team and would have been better had we not lost Carl Brumbaugh from the year before. He was our passer, and he was our thinker. He could get the ball to Van Sickel. In those days the halfbacks passed more than the quarterback. And boy did we pass. In the flats a lot, like they do now."

== Schedule ==
Date	Opponent	Site	Result	Attendance	Source
September 28	Southern College*	Fleming Field; Gainesville, FL	W 54–0		
October 5	vs. VMI	Plant Field; Tampa, FL	W 12–7	10,000	
October 11	at Auburn	Cramton Bowl; Montgomery, AL (rivalry)	W 19–0		
October 19	at Georgia Tech	Grant Field; Atlanta, GA	L 6–19	7,000	
October 26	vs. Georgia	Fairfield Stadium; Jacksonville, FL (rivalry)	W 18–6	20,000	
November 2	at Harvard*	Harvard Stadium; Boston, MA	L 0–14	35,000	
November 16	Clemson^{†}	Fleming Field; Gainesville, FL	W 13–7	10,000	
November 23	at South Carolina	Melton Field; Columbia, SC	W 20–7		
November 28	vs. Washington and Lee	Fairfield Stadium; Jacksonville, FL	W 25–7	12,000	
December 7	vs. Oregon*	Madison Square Garden Stadium; Miami, FL	W 20–6	17,000	
*Non-conference game; ^{†}Homecoming

== Game summaries ==
=== Week 1: Southern College ===
The Gators opened the season with a 54–0 romp of Southern College. The Gators made 19 first downs and 8 touchdowns; Southern College made no first downs.

=== Week 2: VMI ===
Week 2: VMI at Florida

Team	1	2	3	4	Total
VMI	0	0	7	0	7
• Florida	0	6	6	0	12

- Date: October 5
- Location: Plant Field
  Tampa, Florida
- Game attendance: 10,000

Prior to the game, Royce Goodbread and Ed Sauls stood out in preparations. Florida won a close game in Tampa over the V. M. I. Keydets 12 to 7. VMI frequently used the forward pass; and the Gators used a new huddle system.

The first score came from Royce Goodbread after many exchanges of punts. Rainey Cawthon made a 25-yard pass into another touchdown. The Keydets touchdown was scored on a 2-yard run by Dunn.

Captain Cawthon on the beach.

=== Week 3: at Auburn ===
Week 3: Florida at Auburn

Team	1	2	3	4	Total
• Florida	7	6	6	0	19
Auburn	0	0	0	0	0

- Date: October 11
- Location: Cramton Bowl
  Montgomery, Alabama

In Florida's first night game, the Gators defeated the Auburn Tigers 19 to 0.

Florida's first touchdown came on a 30-yard run from Clyde Crabtree through tackle. A 10-yard pass from Red Bethea to Dale Van Sickel brought the second touchdown. The last score was a 15-yard pass from Red McEwen to Jimmy Nolan. After the game, acting under orders of Governor Graves, law enforcement officers seized and destroyed some 75 pints of liquor which had been brought to the contest.

The starting lineup for the Gators against Harvard: Green (left end), Waters (left tackle), McRae (left guard), Haines (center), Houser (right guard), Dedge (right tackle), Hall (right end), Crabtree (quarterback), Bethea (left halfback), Goodbread (right halfback), Cawthon (fullback).

=== Week 4: at Georgia Tech ===
Week 4: Florida at Georgia Tech

Team	1	2	3	4	Total
Florida	0	0	6	0	6
• Ga. Tech	7	6	6	0	19

- Date: October 19
- Location: Grant Field
  Atlanta

Florida lost to coach Bill Alexander's Georgia Tech Yellow Jackets on Grant Field 19–6. Fumbles cost Florida dearly. Georgia Tech's ability to stop the Gator backfield was surprising.

A 30-yard pass, Earl Dunlap to Warner Mizell, and 7 yards after the catch from Mizell, got the first touchdown for the Yellow Jackets. A 25-yard pass from Dunlap to Vance Maree got the second. The final score for Tech came on a pass from Mizell to Stumpy Thomason. A pitch to Rainey Cawthon got the lone Gator score.

=== Week 5: Georgia ===
Week 5: Georgia at Florida

Team	1	2	3	4	Total
Georgia	0	0	0	6	6
• Florida	0	6	6	6	18

- Date: October 26
- Location: Fairfield Stadium
  Jacksonville, Florida
- Game attendance: 20,000

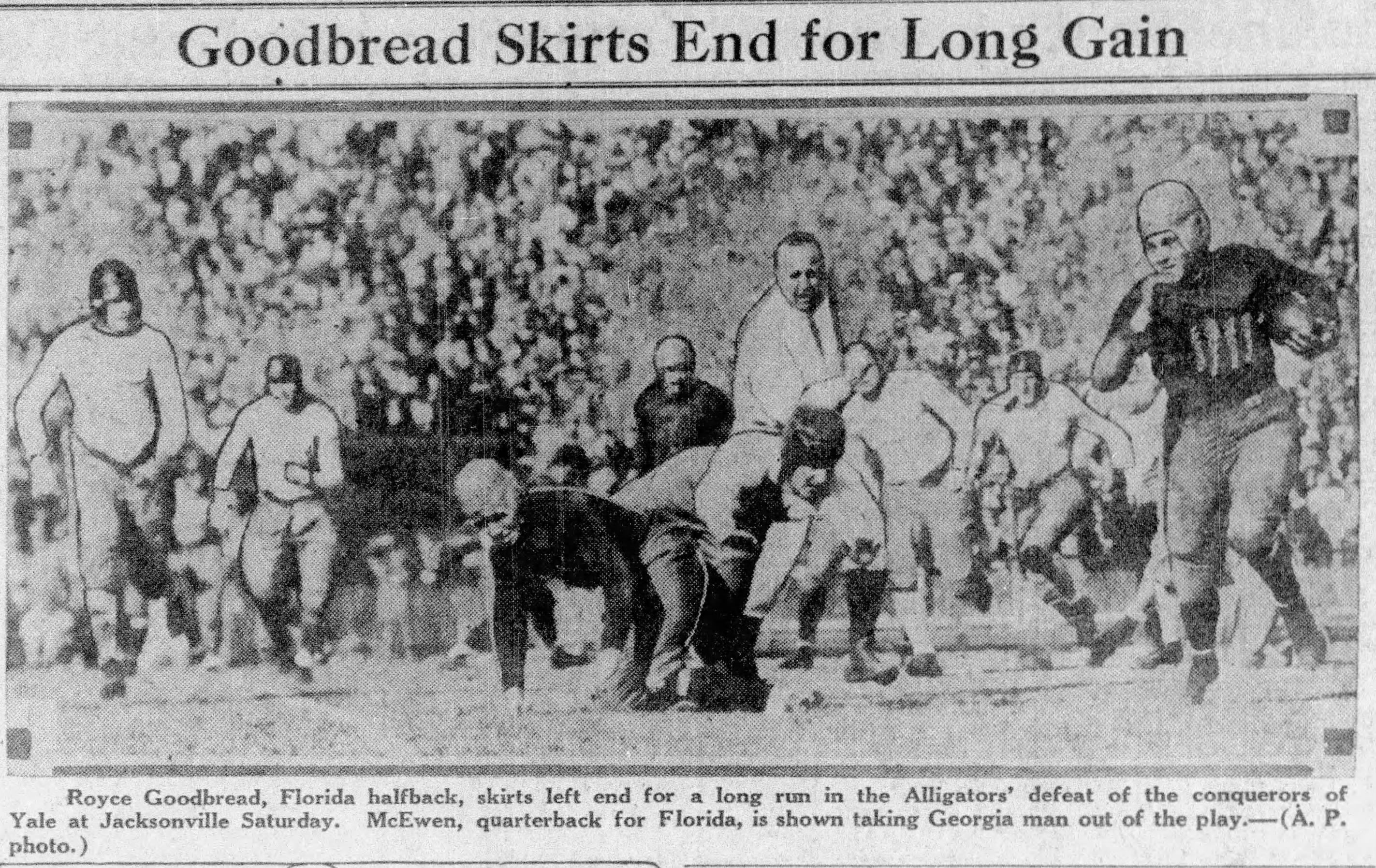
Royce Goodbread running the ball for a long gain.

The Gators upset the Georgia Bulldogs for the second year in a row, by a score of 18 to 6, just two days after the Stock Market Crash. Georgia had already defeated Yale.

A long pass from Red Bethea to Green started things going in the second quarter, down to Georgia's 14-yard line. After driving down to the 3, Bethea scored on a wide end run. Dale Van Sickel recovered a blocked punt in the third quarter inside the 30-yard line. Rainey Cawthon and company drove the ball inside the 10-yard line. A pass from Clyde Crabtree to Van Sickel got a touchdown. Crabtree later returned an interception for a touchdown. In the final minutes, Ed Sauls ran 60 yards through the Georgia defense, the highlight of the contest.

Georgia quarterback Austin Downes broke his arm during the game. Florida running back Royce Goodbread also suffered an injury.

=== Week 6: at Harvard ===
Week 6: Florida at Harvard

Team	1	2	3	4	Total
Florida	0	0	0	0	0
• Harvard	0	7	0	7	14

- Date: November 2
- Location: Harvard Stadium
  Boston, Massachusetts
- Game attendance: 35,000
- Referee: Dr. Eddie O' Brien (Tufts)

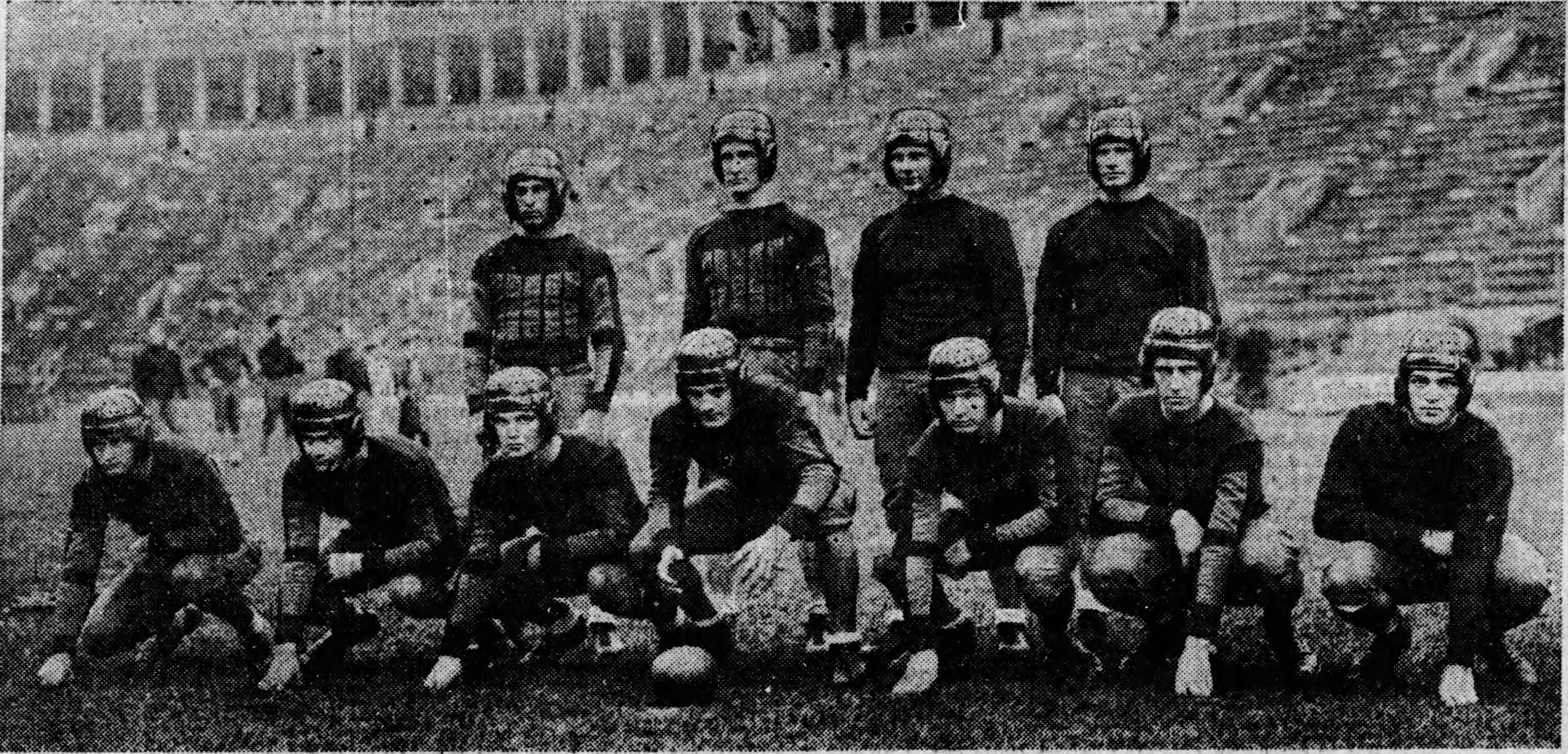
The players of Florida Gators's expected starting-line for their November 2, 1929, football game against the Harvard Crimson pose for group photograph at Harvard Stadium in advance of the game. (Note: Backfield (in rear) left to right: Clyde Crabtree (quarterback); Rainey Cawthon (fullback and team captain); Smith (left halfback); Red Bethea (right halfback) Linemen (in foreground) left to right: Jimmy Nolan (right end), Carlos Proctor (right tackle), William McRae (right guard), Ben Clemons (center), Jimmy Steele (left guard), Dale Waters (left tackle), Dale Van Sickel (left end))

Coach Arnold Horween's Harvard Crimson defeated the Florida Gators 14 to 0 in front of a crowd of 35,000. Michigan coach Fielding Yost watched the game from the stands.

The starting lineup for the Gators against Harvard: Nolan (left end), Proctor (left tackle), Reeves (left guard), Clemons (center), Steele (right guard), Waters (right tackle), Van Sickel (right end), Crabtree (quarterback), Bethea (left halfback), Dorsett (right halfback), Cawthon (fullback).

=== Week 7: Clemson ===
Week 7: Clemson at Florida

Team	1	2	3	4	Total
Clemson	0	0	7	0	7
• Florida	0	6	0	7	13

- Date: November 16
- Location: Fleming Field
  Gainesville, Florida

The Gators beat Josh Cody's Clemson Tigers 13–7 at homecoming. The first Florida score came on a 9-yard pass from Red Bethea to Dale Van Sickel. The second came on a short run by Rainey Cawthon after a 28-yard run by Bethea.

=== Week 8: at South Carolina ===
Week 8: Florida at South Carolina

Team	1	2	3	4	Total
• Florida	7	0	7	6	20
S. Carolina	0	7	0	0	7

- Date: November 23
- Location: Columbia, South Carolina
- Referee: Powell (Wisconsin)

The Gators defeated coach Billy Laval's South Carolina Gamecocks 20 to 7. Florida substitutes started the game, coming in some 5 minutes in after a blocked punt on the 18-yard line. Six runs at the line later, Rainey Cawthon scored. A pass from Clyde Crabtree to Dale Van Sickel got the extra point. Early in the second quarter, South Carolina blocked another punt. This time they capitalized with a 15-yard touchdown pass, Rhame to Stoddard. Boineau added the extra point from placement.

The same Boineau later fumbled a punt, recovered by Florida. A pass from Crabtree to Red Bethea gained 12 and a run around right end from Bethea got a touchdown. Crabtree passed to Van Sickel for the conversion. A Van Sickel interception ended South Carolina's fiercest threat, which eventually turned into another Cawthon touchdown. The final touchdown drive caused injuries to both Van Sickel and Bethea. The try was missed.

The starting lineup for the Gators against South Carolina: L. Greene (left end), Phiel (left tackle), McRae (left guard), Clark (center), James (right guard), Dedge (right tackle), Vickery (right end), McEwen (quarterback), Dorsett (left halfback), Goodbread (right halfback), Silsby (fullback).

=== Week 9: Washington & Lee ===
Week 9: Washington & Lee at Florida

Team	1	2	3	4	Total
W&L	0	0	0	7	7
• Florida	7	6	12	0	25

- Date: November 28
- Location: Jacksonville, Florida
- Game attendance: 12,000

The Gators defeated coach Gene Oberst's Washington & Lee Generals 25–7 in their annual Thanksgiving matchup. Sophomore halfback Monk Dorsett was the star of the game, scoring two touchdowns.

=== Week 10: Oregon ===
Week 10: Oregon at Florida

Team	1	2	3	4	Total
Oregon	0	0	0	6	6
• Florida	0	14	6	0	20

- Date: December 7
- Location: Madison Square Garden Stadium
  Miami
- Game attendance: 25,000+
- Referee: Birch (Earlham)

At the old Madison Square Garden Stadium in Miami on December 7, in front of more than 25,000, the Gators had a major inter-sectional victory over coach John McEwan's Oregon Webfoots 20 to 6. The Gators had a light drill on Fleming Field on the afternoon of the 5th. At 9:30 they embarked on a special train, which transferred to the train bearing the Oregon players at Palatka.

The heat forced many Oregon players to take off their jerseys. Clyde Crabtree, in his final game, had a touchdown on a punt return of 80 yards, Ed Sauls had one on a run through the line of 38 yards. The other score came on 10-yard run by Red McEwen.

The starting lineup for the Gators against Oregon: Parnell (left end), Waters (left tackle), Steele (left guard), Clemons (center), Reeves (right guard), Proctor (right tackle), Nolan (right end), Crabtree (quarterback), Dorsett (left halfback), Goodbread (right halfback), Cawthon (fullback).

== Postseason ==
Red Bethea was elected captain of next year's team.

== Personnel ==
=== Depth chart ===
The following chart provides a visual depiction of Florida's lineup during the 1929 season with games started at the position reflected in parentheses. The chart mimics a Notre Dame Box on offense.

LE
Harry Green (2)
Jimmy Nolan (1)
Ed Parnell (1)

LT	LG	C	RG	RT
Muddy Waters (2)	Bill McRae (2)	Ben Clemons (2)	Mike Houser (1)	Al Dedge (2)
Scabby Phiel (1)	Rip Reeves (1)	Frank Clark (1)	Wilbur James (1)	Carlos Proctor (1)
Carlos Proctor (1)	Jimmy Steele (1)	Weber Haines (1)	Rip Reeves (1)	Muddy Waters (1)
			Jimmy Steele (1)	

RE
Joe Hall (1)
Jimmy Nolan (1)
Dale Van Sickel (1)
Charlie Vickery (1)

QB
Clyde Crabtree (3)
Red McEwen (1)

RHB
Royce Goodbread (3)
Monk Dorsett (1)
Homer Seay (0)

LHB
Red Bethea (2)
Monk Dorsett (2)
Loyd Baldwin (0)

FB
Rainey Cawthon (3)
Link Silsby (1)
Ed Sauls (0)

=== Line ===
==== Starters ====
Player	Position	Games started	High school	Height	Weight	Age
Frank Clark	center		Culver	6'1"	170	20
Ben Clemons	center		Leon	6'2"	185	23
Harry Green	end		Gainesville	6'2"	182	24
Bill McRae	guard		West Palm Beach	6'1"	172	20
Jimmy Nolan	end		Duval	5'10"	170	21
Scabby Phiel	tackle		St. Petersburg			
Carlos Proctor	tackle		Hillsborough			22
Alex "Rip" Reeves	tackle		Alabama	5'8"	184	23
Jimmy Steele	guard		Hillsborough	6'0"	185	20
Dale Van Sickel	end		Gainesville	5'11"	170	20
Dale Waters	tackle		Gainesville	5'11"	170	20

==== Subs ====
Player	Position	High school	Height	Weight	Age
Al Dedge	tackle				
Weber Haines	center				
Joe Hall	end				
Mike Houser	guard	Duval	5'7"	170	23
Wilbur James	guard	Orlando	5'11"	186	20
Charlie Vickery	end	Panama City			

=== Backfield ===
==== Starters ====
Player	Position	Games started	High school	Height	Weight	Age
Red Bethea	halfback		Riverside	5'9"	172	22
Clyde Crabtree	quarterback		J. Sterling Morton	5'8"	147	22
Rainey Cawthon	fullback		Leon	5'11"	180	21
Monk Dorsett	halfback		Duval			
Royce Goodbread	halfback		St. Petersburg	6'0"	190	21
Ed Sauls	fullback		Leon	5'11"	185	21

==== Subs ====
Player	Position	High school	Height	Weight	Age
Lloyd Baldwin	back	Miami	5'11"	180	21
J. Milton "Red" McEwen	quarterback	Wauchula	5'8"	155	20
Homer Seay	halfback				
Lincoln "Link" Silsby	fullback				

=== Coaching staff ===
- Head coach: Charlie Bachman
- Assistants: James Van Fleet, Nash Higgins (line), Joe Holsinger (backfield), Brady Cowell (freshmen), George Weber, A. P. Pierson.

== See also ==
- 1929 College Football All-Southern Team
