= 1929 VMI Keydets football team =

American college football season

1929 VMI Keydets football
- Conference: Southern Conference
- Record: 8–2 (4–2 SoCon)
- Head coach: W. C. Raftery (3rd season)
- Home stadium: Alumni Field

1929 Southern Conference football standings
| | Conf. | | | | | Overall |
| Team | W | | L | | T | W | | L | | T |
|---|---|---|---|---|---|---|---|---|---|---|
| No. 10 Tulane $ | 6 | – | 0 | – | 0 | 9 | – | 0 | – | 0 |
| Tennessee | 6 | – | 0 | – | 1 | 9 | – | 0 | – | 1 |
| North Carolina | 7 | – | 1 | – | 0 | 9 | – | 1 | – | 0 |
| Florida | 6 | – | 1 | – | 0 | 8 | – | 2 | – | 0 |
| Vanderbilt | 5 | – | 1 | – | 0 | 7 | – | 2 | – | 0 |
| Kentucky | 3 | – | 1 | – | 1 | 6 | – | 1 | – | 1 |
| Georgia | 4 | – | 2 | – | 0 | 6 | – | 4 | – | 0 |
| VMI | 4 | – | 2 | – | 0 | 8 | – | 2 | – | 0 |
| Duke | 2 | – | 1 | – | 0 | 4 | – | 6 | – | 0 |
| LSU | 3 | – | 2 | – | 0 | 6 | – | 3 | – | 0 |
| Alabama | 4 | – | 3 | – | 0 | 6 | – | 3 | – | 0 |
| Clemson | 3 | – | 3 | – | 0 | 8 | – | 3 | – | 0 |
| VPI | 2 | – | 3 | – | 0 | 5 | – | 4 | – | 0 |
| Georgia Tech | 3 | – | 5 | – | 0 | 3 | – | 6 | – | 0 |
| South Carolina | 2 | – | 5 | – | 0 | 6 | – | 5 | – | 0 |
| Virginia | 1 | – | 3 | – | 2 | 4 | – | 3 | – | 2 |
| Maryland | 1 | – | 3 | – | 1 | 4 | – | 4 | – | 2 |
| Washington and Lee | 1 | – | 4 | – | 1 | 3 | – | 5 | – | 1 |
| Ole Miss | 0 | – | 4 | – | 2 | 1 | – | 6 | – | 2 |
| Mississippi A&M | 0 | – | 3 | – | 1 | 1 | – | 5 | – | 2 |
| Sewanee | 0 | – | 4 | – | 1 | 2 | – | 5 | – | 2 |
| NC State | 0 | – | 5 | – | 0 | 1 | – | 8 | – | 0 |
| Auburn | 0 | – | 7 | – | 0 | 2 | – | 7 | – | 0 |
$ – Conference champion; Rankings from Dickinson System

The 1929 VMI Keydets football team was an American football team that represented the Virginia Military Institute (VMI) during the 1929 college football season as a member of the Southern Conference. In their third year under head coach W. C. Raftery, the team compiled an overall record of 8–2.

== Schedule ==
| Date | Opponent | Site | Result | Source |
|---|---|---|---|---|
| September 21 | Hampden–Sydney* | Alumni Field; Lexington, VA | W 19–0 | |
| September 28 | Richmond* | Alumni Field; Lexington, VA (rivalry) | W 40–0 | |
| October 5 | vs. Florida | Plant Field; Tampa, FL | L 7–12 | |
| October 12 | The Citadel* | Alumni Field; Lexington, VA (rivalry) | W 13–7 | |
| October 19 | at Virginia | Lambeth Field; Charlottesville, VA | W 20–7 | |
| October 26 | vs. Maryland | City Stadium; Richmond, VA | W 7–6 | |
| November 2 | at Davidson* | Richardson Field; Davidson, NC | W 12–6 | |
| November 9 | vs. Clemson | League Park; Norfolk, VA | W 12–0 | |
| November 16 | Kentucky | Alumni Field; Lexington, VA | L 12–23 | |
| November 28 | vs. VPI | Maher Field; Roanoke, VA (rivalry) | W 14–0 | |
*Non-conference game
