= 1929 Washington and Lee Generals football team =

American college football season

1929 Washington and Lee Generals football
- Conference: Southern Conference
- Record: 3–5–1 (2–2 SoCon)
- Head coach: Eugene Oberst (1st season)
- Home stadium: Wilson Field

1929 Southern Conference football standings
| | Conf. | | | | | Overall |
| Team | W | | L | | T | W | | L | | T |
|---|---|---|---|---|---|---|---|---|---|---|
| No. 10 Tulane $ | 6 | – | 0 | – | 0 | 9 | – | 0 | – | 0 |
| Tennessee | 6 | – | 0 | – | 1 | 9 | – | 0 | – | 1 |
| North Carolina | 7 | – | 1 | – | 0 | 9 | – | 1 | – | 0 |
| Florida | 6 | – | 1 | – | 0 | 8 | – | 2 | – | 0 |
| Vanderbilt | 5 | – | 1 | – | 0 | 7 | – | 2 | – | 0 |
| Kentucky | 3 | – | 1 | – | 1 | 6 | – | 1 | – | 1 |
| Georgia | 4 | – | 2 | – | 0 | 6 | – | 4 | – | 0 |
| VMI | 4 | – | 2 | – | 0 | 8 | – | 2 | – | 0 |
| Duke | 2 | – | 1 | – | 0 | 4 | – | 6 | – | 0 |
| LSU | 3 | – | 2 | – | 0 | 6 | – | 3 | – | 0 |
| Alabama | 4 | – | 3 | – | 0 | 6 | – | 3 | – | 0 |
| Clemson | 3 | – | 3 | – | 0 | 8 | – | 3 | – | 0 |
| VPI | 2 | – | 3 | – | 0 | 5 | – | 4 | – | 0 |
| Georgia Tech | 3 | – | 5 | – | 0 | 3 | – | 6 | – | 0 |
| South Carolina | 2 | – | 5 | – | 0 | 6 | – | 5 | – | 0 |
| Virginia | 1 | – | 3 | – | 2 | 4 | – | 3 | – | 2 |
| Maryland | 1 | – | 3 | – | 1 | 4 | – | 4 | – | 2 |
| Washington and Lee | 1 | – | 4 | – | 1 | 3 | – | 5 | – | 1 |
| Ole Miss | 0 | – | 4 | – | 2 | 1 | – | 6 | – | 2 |
| Mississippi A&M | 0 | – | 3 | – | 1 | 1 | – | 5 | – | 2 |
| Sewanee | 0 | – | 4 | – | 1 | 2 | – | 5 | – | 2 |
| NC State | 0 | – | 5 | – | 0 | 1 | – | 8 | – | 0 |
| Auburn | 0 | – | 7 | – | 0 | 2 | – | 7 | – | 0 |
$ – Conference champion; Rankings from Dickinson System

The 1929 Washington and Lee Generals football team was an American football team that represented Washington and Lee University during the 1929 college football season as a member of the Southern Conference. In their first year under head coach Eugene Oberst, the team compiled an overall record of 3–5–1, with a mark of 1–4–1 in conference play, finishing in 18th place in the SoCon.

== Schedule ==
| Date | Opponent | Site | Result | Attendance | Source |
|---|---|---|---|---|---|
| September 28 | Lynchburg* | Wilson Field; Lexington, VA | W 64–6 | | |
| October 4 | at NC State | Riddick Stadium; Raleigh, NC | W 27–6 | | |
| October 14 | at Kentucky | Stoll Field; Lexington, KY | L 6–20 | | |
| October 19 | vs. West Virginia* | Laidley Field; Charleston, WV | L 6–26 | 15,000 | |
| October 26 | vs. Tennessee | Maher Field; Roanoke, VA | L 0–39 | | |
| November 2 | vs. VPI | Municipal Stadium; Lynchburg, VA | L 6–36 | | |
| November 9 | St. John's (MD)* | Wilson Field; Lexington, VA | W 18–6 | | |
| November 16 | Virginia^{†} | Wilson Field; Lexington, VA | T 13–13 | 7,000 | |
| November 28 | vs. Florida | Fairfield Stadium; Jacksonville, FL | L 7–25 | 12,000 | |
*Non-conference game; ^{†}Homecoming
