= 1929 Ole Miss Rebels football team =

American college football season

1929 Ole Miss Rebels football
- Conference: Southern Conference
- Record: 1–6–2 (0–4–2 SoCon)
- Head coach: Homer Hazel (5th season)
- Home stadium: Hemingway Stadium

1929 Southern Conference football standings
	Conf.					Overall
Team	W		L		T	W		L		T
No. 10 Tulane $	6	–	0	–	0	9	–	0	–	0
Tennessee	6	–	0	–	1	9	–	0	–	1
North Carolina	7	–	1	–	0	9	–	1	–	0
Florida	6	–	1	–	0	8	–	2	–	0
Vanderbilt	5	–	1	–	0	7	–	2	–	0
Kentucky	3	–	1	–	1	6	–	1	–	1
Georgia	4	–	2	–	0	6	–	4	–	0
VMI	4	–	2	–	0	8	–	2	–	0
Duke	2	–	1	–	0	4	–	6	–	0
LSU	3	–	2	–	0	6	–	3	–	0
Alabama	4	–	3	–	0	6	–	3	–	0
Clemson	3	–	3	–	0	8	–	3	–	0
VPI	2	–	3	–	0	5	–	4	–	0
Georgia Tech	3	–	5	–	0	3	–	6	–	0
South Carolina	2	–	5	–	0	6	–	5	–	0
Virginia	1	–	3	–	2	4	–	3	–	2
Maryland	1	–	3	–	1	4	–	4	–	2
Washington and Lee	1	–	4	–	1	3	–	5	–	1
Ole Miss	0	–	4	–	2	1	–	6	–	2
Mississippi A&M	0	–	3	–	1	1	–	5	–	2
Sewanee	0	–	4	–	1	2	–	5	–	2
NC State	0	–	5	–	0	1	–	8	–	0
Auburn	0	–	7	–	0	2	–	7	–	0
$ – Conference champion; Rankings from Dickinson System

The 1929 Ole Miss Rebels football team represented the University of Mississippi (Ole Miss) as a member of the Southern Conference (SoCon) during the 1929 college football season. Led by fifth-year head coach Homer Hazel, the Rebels compiled an overall record of 1–6–2 with a mark of 0–4–2 in conference play, and finished 19th in the SoCon.

== Schedule ==
Date	Opponent	Site	Result	Attendance	Source
September 28	at Vanderbilt	Dudley Field; Nashville, TN (rivalry)	L 7–19		
October 5	at Alabama	Denny Stadium; Tuscaloosa, AL (rivalry)	L 7–22	12,000	
October 12	at Tennessee	Shields–Watkins Field; Knoxville, TN	L 7–52		
October 18	at Loyola (LA)*	Loyola University Stadium; New Orleans, LA	W 26–24		
October 26	at SMU*	Fair Park Stadium; Dallas, TX	L 0–52	8,000	
November 2	Sewanee	Hemingway Stadium; Oxford, MS	T 6–6		
November 9	at Purdue*	Ross–Ade Stadium; West Lafayette, IN	L 7–27		
November 16	at LSU	Tiger Stadium; Baton Rouge, LA (rivalry)	L 6–13	5,000	
November 28	Mississippi A&M	Hemingway Stadium; Oxford, MS (Egg Bowl)	T 7–7	12,000	
*Non-conference game
