= 1929 Auburn Tigers football team =

American college football season

1929 Auburn Tigers football
- Conference: Southern Conference
- Record: 2–7 (0–7 SoCon)
- Head coach: George Bohler (2nd season; first 5 games); Johnny Floyd (1st season; final 4 games)
- Home stadium: Drake Field; Legion Field; Cramton Bowl

1929 Southern Conference football standings
	Conf.					Overall
Team	W		L		T	W		L		T
No. 10 Tulane $	6	–	0	–	0	9	–	0	–	0
Tennessee	6	–	0	–	1	9	–	0	–	1
North Carolina	7	–	1	–	0	9	–	1	–	0
Florida	6	–	1	–	0	8	–	2	–	0
Vanderbilt	5	–	1	–	0	7	–	2	–	0
Kentucky	3	–	1	–	1	6	–	1	–	1
Georgia	4	–	2	–	0	6	–	4	–	0
VMI	4	–	2	–	0	8	–	2	–	0
Duke	2	–	1	–	0	4	–	6	–	0
LSU	3	–	2	–	0	6	–	3	–	0
Alabama	4	–	3	–	0	6	–	3	–	0
Clemson	3	–	3	–	0	8	–	3	–	0
VPI	2	–	3	–	0	5	–	4	–	0
Georgia Tech	3	–	5	–	0	3	–	6	–	0
South Carolina	2	–	5	–	0	6	–	5	–	0
Virginia	1	–	3	–	2	4	–	3	–	2
Maryland	1	–	3	–	1	4	–	4	–	2
Washington and Lee	1	–	4	–	1	3	–	5	–	1
Ole Miss	0	–	4	–	2	1	–	6	–	2
Mississippi A&M	0	–	3	–	1	1	–	5	–	2
Sewanee	0	–	4	–	1	2	–	5	–	2
NC State	0	–	5	–	0	1	–	8	–	0
Auburn	0	–	7	–	0	2	–	7	–	0
$ – Conference champion; Rankings from Dickinson System

The 1929 Auburn Tigers football team was an American football team that represented the Alabama Polytechnic Institute (commonly known as Auburn University) as a member of the Southern Conference (SoCon) during the 1929 college football season. Under head coaches George Bohler and Johnny Floyd, Auburn compiled a 2–7 record.

== Schedule ==
Date	Opponent	Site	Result	Attendance	Source
September 27	Birmingham–Southern*	Cramton Bowl; Montgomery, AL	W 7–0	7,500	
October 5	at Clemson	Riggs Field; Calhoun, SC (rivalry)	L 7–26		
October 11	Florida^{†}	Cramton Bowl; Montgomery, AL (rivalry)	L 0–19		
October 19	Vanderbilt	Legion Field; Birmingham, AL	L 2–41		
October 26	Howard (AL)*	Drake Field; Auburn, AL	W 6–0		
November 2	at Tennessee	Shields–Watkins Field; Knoxville, TN (rivalry)	L 0–27		
November 9	at Tulane	Tulane Stadium; New Orleans, LA (rivalry)	L 0–52	10,000	
November 16	at Georgia	Sanford Field; Athens, GA (rivalry)	L 0–24	> 3,000	
November 28	at Georgia Tech	Grant Field; Atlanta, GA (rivalry)	L 6–19		
*Non-conference game; ^{†}Homecoming
