= 1929 Sewanee Tigers football team =

American college football season

1929 Sewanee Tigers football
- Conference: Southern Conference
- Record: 2–5–2 (0–4–1 SoCon)
- Head coach: W. H. Kirkpatrick (1st season)
- Home stadium: Hardee Field

1929 Southern Conference football standings
| | Conf. | | | | | Overall |
| Team | W | | L | | T | W | | L | | T |
|---|---|---|---|---|---|---|---|---|---|---|
| No. 10 Tulane $ | 6 | – | 0 | – | 0 | 9 | – | 0 | – | 0 |
| Tennessee | 6 | – | 0 | – | 1 | 9 | – | 0 | – | 1 |
| North Carolina | 7 | – | 1 | – | 0 | 9 | – | 1 | – | 0 |
| Florida | 6 | – | 1 | – | 0 | 8 | – | 2 | – | 0 |
| Vanderbilt | 5 | – | 1 | – | 0 | 7 | – | 2 | – | 0 |
| Kentucky | 3 | – | 1 | – | 1 | 6 | – | 1 | – | 1 |
| Georgia | 4 | – | 2 | – | 0 | 6 | – | 4 | – | 0 |
| VMI | 4 | – | 2 | – | 0 | 8 | – | 2 | – | 0 |
| Duke | 2 | – | 1 | – | 0 | 4 | – | 6 | – | 0 |
| LSU | 3 | – | 2 | – | 0 | 6 | – | 3 | – | 0 |
| Alabama | 4 | – | 3 | – | 0 | 6 | – | 3 | – | 0 |
| Clemson | 3 | – | 3 | – | 0 | 8 | – | 3 | – | 0 |
| VPI | 2 | – | 3 | – | 0 | 5 | – | 4 | – | 0 |
| Georgia Tech | 3 | – | 5 | – | 0 | 3 | – | 6 | – | 0 |
| South Carolina | 2 | – | 5 | – | 0 | 6 | – | 5 | – | 0 |
| Virginia | 1 | – | 3 | – | 2 | 4 | – | 3 | – | 2 |
| Maryland | 1 | – | 3 | – | 1 | 4 | – | 4 | – | 2 |
| Washington and Lee | 1 | – | 4 | – | 1 | 3 | – | 5 | – | 1 |
| Ole Miss | 0 | – | 4 | – | 2 | 1 | – | 6 | – | 2 |
| Mississippi A&M | 0 | – | 3 | – | 1 | 1 | – | 5 | – | 2 |
| Sewanee | 0 | – | 4 | – | 1 | 2 | – | 5 | – | 2 |
| NC State | 0 | – | 5 | – | 0 | 1 | – | 8 | – | 0 |
| Auburn | 0 | – | 7 | – | 0 | 2 | – | 7 | – | 0 |
$ – Conference champion; Rankings from Dickinson System

The 1929 Sewanee Tigers football team represented the Sewanee Tigers of Sewanee: The University of the South as a member of the Southern Conference (SoCon) during the 1929 college football season. Led by W. H. Kirkpatrick in his first and only season as head coach, the Tigers compiled an overall record of 2–5–2 with a mark of 0–4–1 in conference play.

== Schedule ==
| Date | Opponent | Site | Result | Attendance | Source |
|---|---|---|---|---|---|
| September 28 | Tennessee Tech* | Hardee Field; Sewanee, TN | W 46–0 | 1,500 | |
| October 5 | Transylvania* | Hardee Field; Sewanee, TN | T 6–6 | | |
| October 12 | at LSU | Tiger Stadium; Baton Rouge, LA | L 14–27 | 7,000 | |
| October 19 | Cumberland (TN)* | Hardee Field; Sewanee, TN | W 33–6 | | |
| October 26 | at Alabama | Legion Field; Birmingham, AL | L 7–35 | | |
| November 2 | at Ole Miss | Hemingway Stadium; Oxford, MS | T 6–6 | | |
| November 9 | at Southwestern (TN)* | Fargason Field; Memphis, TN (rivalry) | L 0–9 | 5,000 | |
| November 16 | at Tulane | Tulane Stadium; New Orleans, LA | L 0–18 | | |
| November 28 | at Vanderbilt | Dudley Field; Nashville, TN (rivalry) | L 6–26 | | |
*Non-conference game
