= 1929 Alabama Crimson Tide football team =

American college football season

1929 Alabama Crimson Tide football
- Conference: Southern Conference
- Record: 6–3 (4–3 SoCon)
- Head coach: Wallace Wade (7th season)
- Offensive scheme: Single-wing
- Captain: Billy Hicks
- Home stadium: Denny Stadium; Legion Field; Cramton Bowl

1929 Southern Conference football standings
	Conf.					Overall
Team	W		L		T	W		L		T
No. 10 Tulane $	6	–	0	–	0	9	–	0	–	0
Tennessee	6	–	0	–	1	9	–	0	–	1
North Carolina	7	–	1	–	0	9	–	1	–	0
Florida	6	–	1	–	0	8	–	2	–	0
Vanderbilt	5	–	1	–	0	7	–	2	–	0
Kentucky	3	–	1	–	1	6	–	1	–	1
Georgia	4	–	2	–	0	6	–	4	–	0
VMI	4	–	2	–	0	8	–	2	–	0
Duke	2	–	1	–	0	4	–	6	–	0
LSU	3	–	2	–	0	6	–	3	–	0
Alabama	4	–	3	–	0	6	–	3	–	0
Clemson	3	–	3	–	0	8	–	3	–	0
VPI	2	–	3	–	0	5	–	4	–	0
Georgia Tech	3	–	5	–	0	3	–	6	–	0
South Carolina	2	–	5	–	0	6	–	5	–	0
Virginia	1	–	3	–	2	4	–	3	–	2
Maryland	1	–	3	–	1	4	–	4	–	2
Washington and Lee	1	–	4	–	1	3	–	5	–	1
Ole Miss	0	–	4	–	2	1	–	6	–	2
Mississippi A&M	0	–	3	–	1	1	–	5	–	2
Sewanee	0	–	4	–	1	2	–	5	–	2
NC State	0	–	5	–	0	1	–	8	–	0
Auburn	0	–	7	–	0	2	–	7	–	0
$ – Conference champion; Rankings from Dickinson System

The 1929 Alabama Crimson Tide football team (variously "Alabama", "UA" or "Bama") represented the University of Alabama in the 1929 college football season. It was the Crimson Tide's 36th overall and 8th season as a member of the Southern Conference (SoCon). The team was led by head coach Wallace Wade, in his seventh year, and played their home games at Denny Stadium in Tuscaloosa, at Legion Field in Birmingham and at the Cramton Bowl in Montgomery, Alabama. They finished the season with a record of six wins and three losses (6–3 overall, 4–3 in the SoCon).

The Crimson Tide opened the season with a 55–0 victory over Mississippi College. The game also marked the first for Alabama at Denny Stadium, as it replaced Denny Field as the home field for the Crimson Tide. They followed the win with consecutive victories over Ole Miss and Chattanooga before they traveled to Knoxville for their first road game of the season.

Against Tennessee, the Crimson Tide lost for a second year in a row, falling 6–0. A blocked punt set-up Tennessee's touchdown and Alabama turned the ball over on downs twice inside the Volunteer ten-yard line. They rebounded the next week with a victory over Sewanee in their first Legion Field game of the season, but lost to Vanderbilt in the week that followed 13–0. Alabama then closed the season with victories over Kentucky and Georgia Tech and a loss against Georgia in the season finale.

== Schedule ==
Date	Opponent	Site	Result	Attendance	Source
September 28	Mississippi College*	Denny Stadium; Tuscaloosa, AL	W 55–0	6,000	
October 5	Ole Miss^{†}	Denny Stadium; Tuscaloosa, AL (rivalry)	W 22–7	12,000	
October 12	Chattanooga*	Denny Stadium; Tuscaloosa, AL	W 46–0	5,000	
October 19	at Tennessee	Shields–Watkins Field; Knoxville, TN (rivalry)	L 13–15	20,000	
October 26	Sewanee	Legion Field; Birmingham, AL	W 35–7		
November 2	at Vanderbilt	Dudley Field; Nashville, TN	L 0–13	15,000	
November 9	Kentucky	Cramton Bowl; Montgomery, AL	W 24–13	8,000	
November 16	at Georgia Tech	Grant Field; Atlanta, GA (rivalry)	W 14–0	20,000	
November 28	Georgia	Legion Field; Birmingham, AL (rivalry)	L 0–12	20,448	
*Non-conference game; ^{†}Homecoming
