= Jack Norris (American football) =

American football player (1909–2008)

- Norris, c. 1931

No. 15
- Position: End

Personal information
- Born: May 18, 1909; Lancaster, Pennsylvania, U.S.
- Died: May 18, 2008 (aged 99); California, U.S.
- Listed height: 6 ft 3 in (1.91 m)
- Listed weight: 185 lb (84 kg)

Career information
- High school: Westinghouse (PA)
- College: Western Maryland; Maryland

Career history
- Staten Island Stapletons (1932)

Career statistics
- Games played: 1–2
- Games started: 1
- Stats at Pro Football Reference

John Clayton Norris (May 18, 1909 – May 18, 2008) was an American football end who played one season in the National Football League (NFL) for the Staten Island Stapletons. He played college football at Western Maryland and Maryland.

== Early life and education ==
A native of Lancaster, Pennsylvania, Norris attended high school at Westinghouse in Pittsburgh. He then attended college at the Western Maryland and Maryland universities. At Maryland, he excelled in four sports, earning letters in football, lacrosse, track and field, and basketball. He won honorable mention honors in the all-Southern football team, was named all-Maryland in basketball, and all-American in lacrosse.

== Professional career ==
Following his career at Maryland he signed a contract to play professional football with the National Football League (NFL)'s Staten Island Stapletons. With them he appeared in between one and two games, starting one. The Stapletons finished the year with a record of 2–7–3, and folded the next season, ending his professional career.

== Death ==
Norris died on his 99th birthday, May 18, 2008, in California. He was the last living Staten Island Stapletons player.
