= Wally Opekun =

American sports coach (1905–1997)

Biographical details
- Born: January 16, 1905
- Died: December 18, 1997 (aged 92)

Playing career

Football
- 1928–1929: Penn
- Position: Fullback

Coaching career (HC unless noted)

Football
- 1935–1941: Mount St. Mary's (assistant)
- 1942–1946: Mount St. Mary's

Basketball
- 1941–1942: Mount St. Mary's
- 1943–1947: Mount St. Mary's
- 1948: Mount St. Mary's (interim HC)

Baseball
- 1944: Mount St. Mary's
- 1946–1948: Mount St. Mary's

Head coaching record
- Overall: 50–34 (basketball); 19–36 (baseball)

Walter J. Opekun (January 16, 1905 - December 18, 1997) was an American football, basketball and baseball coach. He served as the head football coach at Mount St. Mary's University in Emmitsburg, Maryland from 1942 to 1946. Opekun was also the head basketball coach and head baseball coach at Mount St. Mary's. He played college football as a fullback at the University of Pennsylvania.
