= Old Byrd Stadium =

Former stadium in College Park, Maryland, U.S.

- "The Byrd Cage"
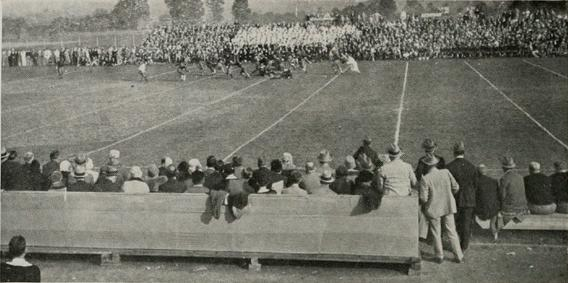
- Interactive map of Old Byrd Stadium
- Location: College Park, Maryland, U.S.
- Coordinates: 38°59′2″N 76°56′9″W
- Owner: University of Maryland
- Operator: University of Maryland
- Capacity: 5,000
- Surface: Grass

Construction
- Opened: November 24, 1923
- Closed: 1947 or 1949
- Demolished: 1953
- Cost: $60,000
- Architect: H. D. Watts Construction Company

Tenant
- Maryland Terrapins (1923–1947, 1949?)

Old Byrd Stadium, also known as Byrd Stadium or Byrd Field and nicknamed "the Byrd Cage", was the home stadium for the University of Maryland from 1923 until 1947. It was located in College Park, Maryland, United States, east of Baltimore Avenue on the site of the school's present-day fraternity row. The seating capacity for the stadium was 5,000.

== History ==
In 1915, Harry "Curley" Byrd, head coach for what was then the Maryland Agricultural football team, petitioned the school for funds for a stadium. At that time, the football team lacked any dedicated facilities and had one poorly suited athletic field on which to practice and play games. The new stadium was originally to be called the University of Maryland Athletic Field, but the student body protested for a better name. The Board of Regents voted to name the stadium after Byrd, who was a former quarterback, the current coach, and future university president.

The stadium was built by the H. D. Watts Construction Company, which was owned by Harry Watts, an alumnus who played as a fullback on the football team from 1901 to 1903. Construction was completed in 1923 at a cost of $60,000. The inaugural game was played against Randolph-Macon on September 29, which Maryland won, 53–0. The stadium was officially dedicated on November 24, for the Homecoming game against Catholic. Maryland won that game as well, 40-6, in front of a crowd of 3,000. Between 1924 and 1947, Maryland played most home games in the facility, but for major games often traveled to Griffith Stadium in Washington, D.C. or Memorial Stadium in Baltimore, both of which were significantly larger. In 1944, Byrd Stadium hosted the first night game in College Park, which pitted the Terrapins against Hampden-Sydney College. During the 1948 season, the Terrapins played all of their home games at Griffith Stadium in Washington, D.C. In 1950, the old stadium was replaced by the significantly larger Byrd Stadium (which was renamed Maryland Stadium in 2015), and the original stadium was razed in 1953.
