= 1929 college football rankings =

- Season: 1929
- Bowl season: 1929–30 bowl games
- End of season champions: Notre Dame (Note: Dickinson System (received Rissman Trophy), Dunkel System, Houlgate System, per Erksine poll (received Erskine Trophy), unanimous consensus of board of the Veteran Athletes of Philadelphia (awarded Bonniwell Trophy), Billingsley Report, Boand System, College Football Researchers Association, Helms Athletic Foundation, National Championship Foundation, Poling System, Sagarin Ratings Elo chess method); USC (Note: per Berryman QPRS, and Sagarin Ratings Predictor method) (not claimed); Pittsburgh (Note: per Parke H. Davis (Spalding's Official Foot Ball Guide))

The 1929 college football rankings ranked the best teams participating in the 1929 college football season.

== Champions (by method) ==
Various different rankings (using differing methodologies) have identified Notre Dame, Pittsburgh, or the University of Southern California as the season's champion.

- Berryman QPRS: University of Southern California
- Billingsley Report: Notre Dame
- Bonniwell Trophy vote: (Note: awarded upon unanimous consensus of the board of the Veteran Athletes of Philadelphia) Notre Dame
- Boand System: Notre Dame
- College Football Researchers Association: Notre Dame
- Parke H. Davis (Note: for Spalding's Official Foot Ball Guide): Pittsburgh
- Dickinson System: Notre Dame
- Dunkel System: Notre Dame
- Erskine Trophy poll: Notre Dame
- Helms Athletic Foundation: Notre Dame
- Houlgate System: University of Southern California
- National Championship Foundation: Notre Dame
- Poling System: Notre Dame
- Sagarin Ratings Elo chess method: Notre Dame
- Sagarin Ratings Predictor method: University of Southern California

Note: Dickinson System, Dunkel System, Houlgate System, Erskine Trophy poll, and Bonniwell Trophy vote were given contemporarily. All other rankings were given retroactively

== Dickinson System ==
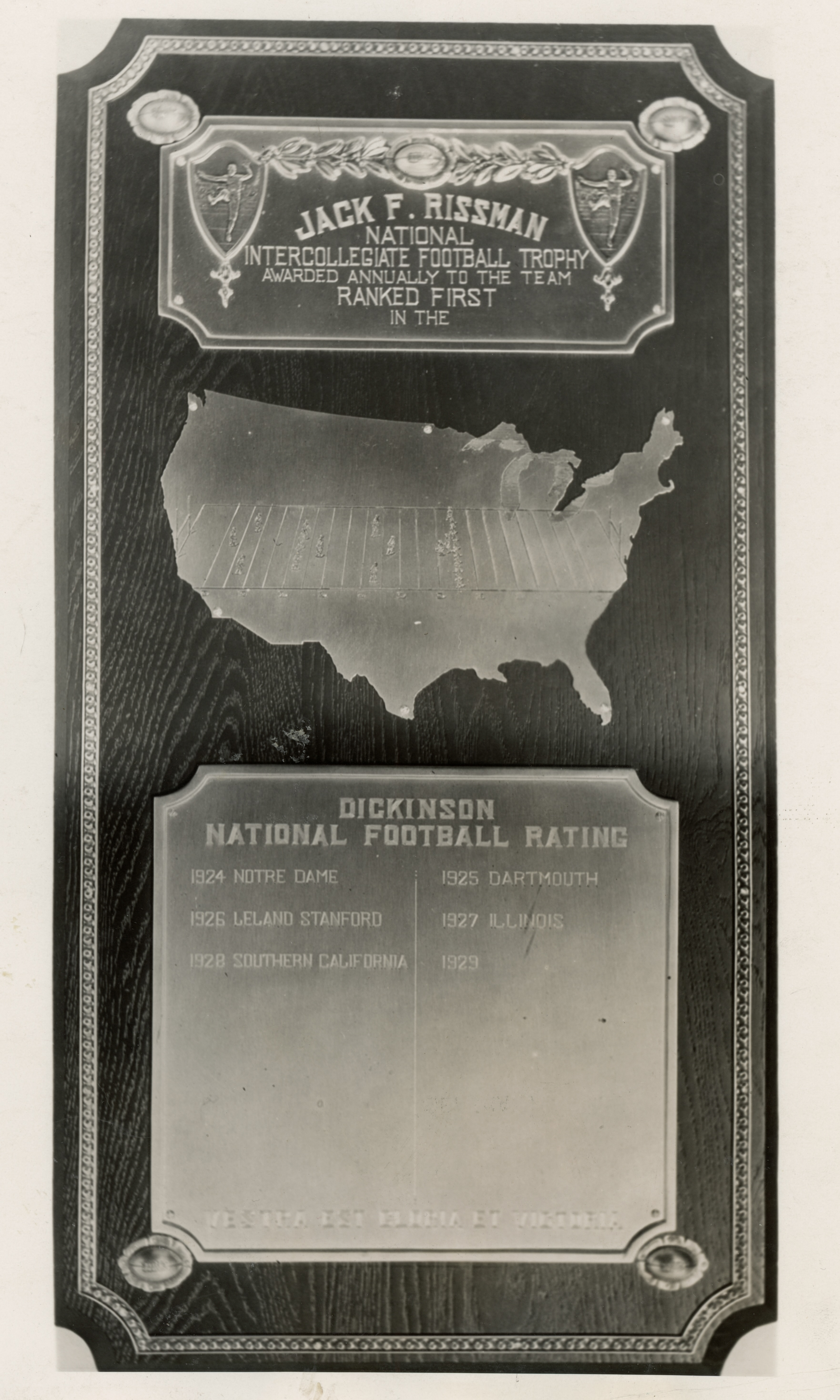
Jack F. Rissman National Intercollegiate Football Trophy — Awarded annually to the team ranked first in the Dickinson National Football Rating

The Dickinson System was a mathematical rating system devised by University of Illinois economics professor Frank G. Dickinson.

Notre Dame and Pittsburgh, both with nine wins and no losses or ties (9–0) were ranked first and second by Dickinson, with the Irish getting the higher rating based on their opposition. As Grantland Rice noted in his column, "There is no questioning the fact that among the unbeaten teams who were not even tied, Notre Dame fought its way through the hardest field. But when it comes to saying that Notre Dame could beat Pittsburgh or that Notre Dame could beat Purdue or that Pittsburgh could beat Purdue -- that is something else again,"

Dickinson System
Rank	Team	Record	Rating
1	Notre Dame	9–0	25.00
2	Purdue	8–0	23.60
3	Pittsburgh	9–0	22.00
4	California	7–1–1	20.00
5	Illinois	6–1–1	18.70
6	USC	9–2	17.75
7	Nebraska	4–1–3	16.82
8	TCU	9–0–1	16.51
9	SMU	6–0–4	16.31
10	Tulane	9–0	16.22
11	Penn	7–2	15.00

== Erskine Trophy ==
The Albert Russel Erskine Trophy poll results were released on January 2. In the final ballot between only the three top contenders, Notre Dame won the trophy and the national championship with 179 votes, followed by Pittsburgh with 41 and Purdue with 2.

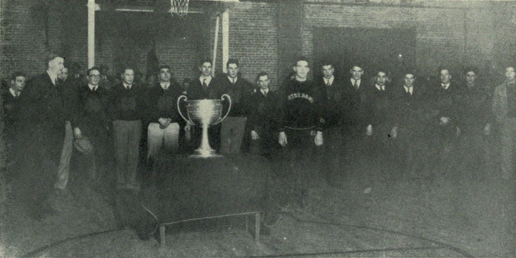
Notre Dame received the Erskine Trophy following the season.

Erskine Trophy
Rank	Team	Record
1	Notre Dame (179)	9–0
2	Pittsburgh (41)	9–1
3	Purdue (2)	8–0

== See also ==
- 1929 College Football All-America Team
