= Glen Bingham =

American football and basketball coach (1890–1966)

Biographical details
- Born: November 2, 1890; Sabetha, Kansas, U.S.
- Died: March 13, 1966 (aged 75); Des Moines, Iowa, U.S.

Playing career

Football
- 1912–1915: Denver

Coaching career (HC unless noted)

Football
- 1918: Wisconsin (assistant)
- 1922: Denver (assistant)
- 1923–1925: Des Moines Roosevelt HS (IA)
- 1926–1936: Iowa Wesleyan

Basketball
- 1925–1936: Iowa Wesleyan

Administrative career (AD unless noted)
- 1926–1937: Iowa Wesleyan

Head coaching record
- Overall: 54–33–7 (college football); 75–93 (college basketball)

Accomplishments and honors

Championships
- Football; 2 Iowa Conference (1929–1930)

Glen Arthur Bingham (November 2, 1890 – March 13, 1966) was an American football and basketball coach. He served as the head coach at Iowa Wesleyan College from 1926 to 1936, compiling a record of 54–33–7. Bingham was also the head basketball coach at Iowa Wesleyan from 1925 to 1936, tallying a mark of 75–93.

Bingham worked for the Veterans Administration Center in Des Moines, Iowa, before retiring in 1960. He died of leukemia on March 13, 1966, at Iowa Methodist Hospital in Des Moines.

== Head coaching record ==
=== College football ===
Year	Team	Overall	Conference	Standing	Bowl/playoffs
Iowa Wesleyan Tigers (Iowa Conference) (1926–1936)
1926	Iowa Wesleyan	2–4–1	1–3	T–11th	
1927	Iowa Wesleyan	4–4	2–3	10th	
1928	Iowa Wesleyan	5–3	3–2	T–5th	
1929	Iowa Wesleyan	8–0	5–0	1st	
1930	Iowa Wesleyan	6–2–2	4–0–1	T–1st	
1931	Iowa Wesleyan	7–1–1	3–1–1	T–3rd	
1932	Iowa Wesleyan	5–2–1	3–2	6th	
1933	Iowa Wesleyan	7–2	6–0	2nd	
1934	Iowa Wesleyan	3–5–1	1–4–1	13th	
1935	Iowa Wesleyan	2–7	1–6	11th	
1936	Iowa Wesleyan	5–3–1	3–3–1	7th	
Iowa Wesleyan:		54–33–7	32–24–4		
Total:		54–33–7			
National championship Conference title Conference division title or championship game berth
