= Koken =

Koken can refer to:

- Empress Kōken (713–770), Empress of Japan (749–758)
- Lagged Fibonacci generator, a pseudorandom number generator also known as a Koken generator.
- Mike Koken (1909-1962), American football coach and player
- Walt Koken (born 1946), American claw-hammer banjo player, fiddler, and singer
