= Vincent E. Montgomery =

American football and basketball coach (1890–1945)

Biographical details
- Born: May 6, 1890; Newell, Iowa, U.S.
- Died: November 12, 1945 (aged 55) near Mountain View, Arkansas, U.S.
- Education: Morningside (1913)

Playing career

Football
- 1909–1912: Morningside

Track and field
- 1909–1913: Morningside
- Position: Quarterback (football)

Coaching career (HC unless noted)

Football
- 1913: Ida Grove HS (IA)
- 1914–1915: Newton HS (IA)
- 1916–1922: Yankton
- 1927–1930: South Dakota
- 1933–1942: Southern Normal

Basketball
- 1923–1927: South Dakota

Track and field
- 1913–1914: Ida Grove HS (IA)
- 1923–1931: South Dakota

Administrative career (AD unless noted)
- 1916–1923: Yankton
- 1927–1930: South Dakota

Head coaching record
- Overall: 54–52–5 (college football); 33–35 (college basketball)

Accomplishments and honors

Championships
- Football; 1 SDIC (1920); 1 NCC (1927)

Vincent E. Montgomery (May 6, 1890 – November 12, 1945) was an American football, basketball, and track and field coach and college athletics administrator. He served as the head football coach at Yankton College in Yankton, South Dakota from 1916 to 1922, the University of South Dakota from 1927 to 1930, and Southern State Normal School—later known as University of South Dakota–Springfield—from 1933 to 1942. Montgomery was also the head basketball coach at South Dakota from 1923 to 1927 and the school's head track coach from 1923 to 1931.

Montgomery was born on May 6, 1890, in Newell, Iowa. He moved with his family in 1902 to Sioux City, Iowa, where he attended Sioux City High School and graduated from Morningside Academy in 1909. He then played college football and ran track at Morningside College, also in Sioux City, from which he graduated in 1913. He played quarterback on the football team and was captain of the track team in the spring of 1913.

Montgomery began his coaching career in the fall of 1913 as football and track coach at Ida Grove High School in Ida Grove, Iowa.

served as a major in the United States Army Air Forces during World War II. He was killed in a crash of a military aircraft, on November 12, 1945, near Mountain View, Arkansas.

== Head coaching record ==
=== College football ===
Year	Team	Overall	Conference	Standing	Bowl/playoffs
Yankton Greyhounds (Independent) (1916)
1916	Yankton	3–4			
Yankton Greyhounds (South Dakota Intercollegiate Conference) (1917–1922)
1917	Yankton	5–0–1			
1918	Yankton	0–1			
1919	Yankton	6–1			
1920	Yankton	5–1–2	4–0–1	1st	
1921	Yankton	3–4	1–2	T–3rd	
1922	Yankton	6–2	4–1	3rd	
Yankton:		28–13–3			
South Dakota Coyotes (North Central Conference) (1927–1930)
1927	South Dakota	7–2	5–0	1st	
1928	South Dakota	3–5	1–3	5th	
1929	South Dakota	4–4–1	0–3–1	5th	
1930	South Dakota	1–5–2	0–4	5th	
South Dakota:		15–16–3	6–10–1		
Southern Normal Pointers (South Dakota Intercollegiate Conference) (1933–1942)
1933	Southern Normal	3–5	2–4	7th	
1934	Southern Normal	1–3–2	1–3–1	7th	
1935	Southern Normal	3–3	3–2	4th	
1936	Southern Normal	5–2	2–2	6th	
1937	Southern Normal	5–3	4–1	T–2nd	
1938	Southern Normal	4–2	3–2	4th	
1939	Southern Normal	2–5	1–4	9th	
1940	Southern Normal	0–8	0–4	5th	
1941	Southern Normal	2–4	1–2	T–3rd	
1942	Southern Normal	1–4			
Southern Normal:		26–39–2			
Total:		54–52–5			
National championship Conference title Conference division title or championship game berth
