= Paul B. Parker =

American football and basketball coach (1898–1960)

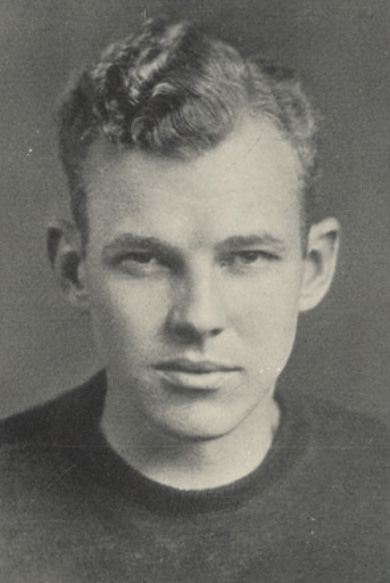
- Parker pictured in Orient 1928, Ball State yearbook

Biographical details
- Born: July 9, 1898; Greentown, Indiana, U.S.
- Died: March 12, 1960 (aged 61); Springfield, Ohio, U.S.

Playing career

Basketball
- 1922–1925: Indiana

Baseball
- 1923–1925: Indiana

Coaching career (HC unless noted)

Football
- 1928–1929: Ball State Teachers

Basketball
- 1925–1930: Ball State Teachers

Head coaching record
- Overall: 3–9–2 (football); 55–34 (basketball)

Paul Barbour "Shorty" Parker (July 9, 1898 – March 12, 1960) was an American football and basketball coach. He served as the head football coach at Ball Teachers College, Eastern Division, Indiana State Normal School—renamed Ball State Teachers College in 1929 and now known as Ball State University—from 1928 to 1929, compiling a record of 3–9–2. Parker was also the head basketball coach at Ball State from 1925 to 1930, tallying a mark of 55–34.

== Early life and college career ==
Parker was born in 1898, in Greentown, Indiana, to Edmund L. and Elizabeth Parker. He attended school in Kokomo, Indiana, graduating from Kokomo High School in 1917. Parker served as a non-commissioned officer in the United States Army during World War I, before attending Indiana University.

== Death ==
Parker died on March 12, 1960, in Springfield, Ohio.

== Head coaching record ==
=== Football ===
Year	Team	Overall	Conference	Standing	Bowl/playoffs
Ball Teachers Hoosieroons / Ball State Cardinals (Independent) (1928–1929)
1928	Ball Teachers	3–2–2			
1929	Ball State	0–7			
Ball State Teachers / Ball State:		3–9–2			
Total:		3–9–2			
