= Casey Finnegan =

American football coach (1890–1958)

Biographical details
- Born: March 28, 1890; New Richmond, Wisconsin, U.S.
- Died: December 28, 1958 (aged 68); Grafton, North Dakota, U.S.

Coaching career (HC unless noted)
- 1928–1940: North Dakota Agricultural

Administrative career (AD unless noted)
- 1928–1940: North Dakota Agricultural

Head coaching record
- Overall: 57–48–11

Accomplishments and honors

Championships
- 2 NCC (1932, 1935)

Charles Casey Finnegan (March 28, 1890 – December 28, 1958) was an American football coach. He served as the head football coach at North Dakota Agricultural College—now known as North Dakota State University—from 1928 to 1940, compiling a career college football record of 57–48–11. In 1928, Finnegan co-coached with Stanley Borleske, who had previously coached at North Dakota Agricultural from 1919 to 1921 and again from 1923 to 1924.

Finnegan graduated from Ripon College in Ripon, Wisconsin in 1913 and attended the University of Wisconsin for graduate study in 1924. He died on December 28, 1958, in Grafton, North Dakota.

== Head coaching record ==
Year	Team	Overall	Conference	Standing	Bowl/playoffs
North Dakota Agricultural Bison (North Central Conference) (1928–1940)
1928	North Dakota Agricultural	3–4–1	1–3	T–3rd	
1929	North Dakota Agricultural	4–3–2	1–1–2	3rd	
1930	North Dakota Agricultural	7–2	3–1	2nd	
1931	North Dakota Agricultural	5–5	2–2	T–2nd	
1932	North Dakota Agricultural	7–2	4–0	1st	
1933	North Dakota Agricultural	3–2–4	2–1–1	2nd	
1934	North Dakota Agricultural	5–3–2	2–1–1	T–2nd	
1935	North Dakota Agricultural	7–1–1	4–0–1	T–1st	
1936	North Dakota Agricultural	4–5	2–2	3rd	
1937	North Dakota Agricultural	5–4	2–2	T–2nd	
1938	North Dakota Agricultural	5–4	3–1	T–2nd	
1939	North Dakota Agricultural	1–6–1	0–5	7th	
1940	North Dakota Agricultural	1–8	0–5	7th	
North Dakota Agricultural:		57–48–11	26–24–5		
Total:		57–48–11			
National championship Conference title Conference division title or championship game berth
