= Tom Skemp =

American lawyer

Biographical details
- Born: August 25, 1897; La Crosse, Wisconsin, U.S.
- Died: May 22, 1977 (aged 79); La Crosse, Wisconsin, U.S.

Playing career

Football
- c. 1914: La Crosse State Normal

Coaching career (HC unless noted)

Football
- 1919–1932: Saint Mary's (MN)

Basketball
- 1919–1928: Saint Mary's (MN)

Baseball
- 1924–1928: Saint Mary's (MN)

Administrative career (AD unless noted)
- ?–1928: Saint Mary's (MN)

Head coaching record
- Overall: 60–36–9 (football); 27–73 (basketball); 4–17 (baseball)

Accomplishments and honors

Championships
- Football; 2 MIAC (1928–1929)

Thomas H. Skemp (August 25, 1897 – May 22, 1977) was an American college football, college basketball, and college baseball coach, athletics administrator, and lawyer. He served as the head football coach at Saint Mary's College—now known as Saint Mary's University of Minnesota—in Winona, Minnesota from 1919 to 1932, compiling a record of 60–36–9. Skemp was also the head basketball coach at Saint Mary's from 1919 to 1928, amassing a record of 27–73, and the school's head baseball coach from 1924 to 1928, tallying a mark of 4–17.

Skemp was born on August 25, 1897, in La Crosse, Wisconsin. He graduated from La Crosse Central High School in 1913 and then attended La Crosse State Normal School—now known as University of Wisconsin–La Crosse, where he played college football before graduating in 1915.

Skemp began a law practice in La Crosse in 1928 and formed a partnership with Quincy Hale in 1936. He died on May 22, 1977, in La Crosse.

== Head coaching record ==
=== Football ===
Year	Team	Overall	Conference	Standing	Bowl/playoffs
Saint Mary's Maroon and White (Independent) (1919–1927)
1919	Saint Mary's	5–3			
1920	Saint Mary's	1–6–1			
1921	Saint Mary's	2–4–1			
1922	Saint Mary's	4–2			
1923	Saint Mary's	4–4–1			
1924	Saint Mary's	4–1–3			
1925	Saint Mary's	7–1			
1926	Saint Mary's	4–4			
1927	Saint Mary's	7–0			
Saint Mary's Redmen (Minnesota Intercollegiate Athletic Conference) (1928–1929)
1928	Saint Mary's	5–2	3–1	T–1st	
1929	Saint Mary's	6–1–1	3–0–1	1st	
Saint Mary's Redmen (Independent) (1930–1932)
1930	Saint Mary's	4–4			
1931	Saint Mary's	3–2–2			
1932	Saint Mary's	4–2			
Saint Mary's:		60–36–9	6–1–1		
Total:		60–36–9			
National championship Conference title Conference division title or championship game berth
