= 1930 South Dakota State Jackrabbits football team =

American college football season

1930 South Dakota State Jackrabbits football
- Conference: North Central Conference
- Record: 2–6–1 (1–3 NCC)
- Head coach: Cy Kasper (3rd season)
- Home stadium: State Field

1930 North Central Conference football standings
	Conf.					Overall
Team	W		L		T	W		L		T
North Dakota $	4	–	0	–	0	9	–	1	–	0
North Dakota Agricultural	3	–	1	–	0	7	–	2	–	0
Morningside	2	–	2	–	0	7	–	2	–	0
South Dakota State	1	–	3	–	0	2	–	6	–	1
South Dakota	0	–	4	–	0	1	–	5	–	2
$ – Conference champion

The 1930 South Dakota State Jackrabbits football team was an American football team that represented South Dakota State University in the North Central Conference (NCC) during the 1930 college football season. In its third season under head coach Cy Kasper, the team compiled a 2–6–1 record and was outscored by a total of 197 to 48.

== Schedule ==
Date	Opponent	Site	Result	Attendance	Source
September 22	Southern Normal*	State Field; Brookings, SD	W 21–0		
September 27	at Minnesota*	Memorial Stadium; Minneapolis, MN	L 0–48	20,000	
October 4	St. Olaf*	State Field; Brookings, SD	L 0–20		
October 18	at North Dakota	Memorial Stadium; Grand Forks, ND	L 0–21		
October 25	South Dakota	State Field; Brookings, SD (rivalry)	W 13–6		
November 1	at Morningside	Bass Field; Sioux City, IA	L 0–13		
November 8	at Wisconsin*	Camp Randall Stadium; Madison, WI	L 7–58		
November 15	North Dakota Agricultural	State Field; Brookings, SD (rivalry)	L 0–24		
November 21	at Loyola (IL)*	Loyola Stadium; Chicago, IL	T 7–7		
*Non-conference game
