= 1929 Kent State Golden Flashes football team =

American college football season

1929 Kent State Golden Flashes football
- Conference: Independent
- Record: 1–7
- Head coach: Merle E. Wagoner (5th season)
- Home stadium: Rockwell Field, Bowers Field

1929 Midwestern college football independents records
	Conf.			Overall
Team	W	L	T	W		L		T
No. 1 Notre Dame		–		9	–	0	–	0
Detroit		–		7	–	1	–	1
Haskell		–		8	–	2	–	0
Loyola (IL)		–		5	–	2	–	1
Michigan State		–		5	–	3	–	0
John Carroll		–		5	–	3	–	1
Marquette		–		4	–	3	–	1
Butler		–		4	–	4	–	0
Michigan Tech		–		2	–	2	–	1
Wabash		–		4	–	5	–	0
Saint Louis		–		3	–	4	–	1
DePaul		–		2	–	7	–	0
Kent State		–		1	–	7	–	0
Valparaiso		–		1	–	7	–	0
Ball State		–		0	–	7	–	0
Rankings from Dickinson System

The 1929 Kent State Golden Flashes football team represented Kent State during the 1929 college football season. In its fifth season under head coach Merle E. Wagoner, Kent State compiled a 1–7 record and was outscored by a total of 162 to 20.

The Chestnut Burr called the 1929 season a "building year" noting that most of the team would return for the 1930 season when Kent State would be a member of the Ohio Conference. The same publication also noted that the team's playing all but two of its games on the road, for the second straight year, was a "very regrettable feature" that put a burden on the team and deprived them of the support of the student body. The Chestnut Burr noted that the lack of home games was the result of "the lack of a suitable playing field" and called for the situation to be "remedied at once for the benefit of the entire school." The two home games Kent State did play were both played at Bowers Field, the home football stadium for Theodore Roosevelt High School. Kent State had used Bowers Field for their final home game in 1928, and played there again for one game in 1930 and one game in 1938.

== Schedule ==
Date	Opponent	Site	Result	Attendance	Source
September 28	at Oberlin	Oberlin, OH	L 0–19		
October 5	at Akron	Buchtel Field; Akron, OH	L 0–25		
October 12	at Heidelberg	Tiffin, OH	L 2–25		
October 19	at Kenyon	Gambier, OH	L 15–21		
October 25	at John Carroll	Cleveland, OH	L 0–32		
November 11	Rio Grande	Bowers Field; Kent, OH (Armistice Day)	W 3–0	4,500	
November 16	Baldwin-Wallace	Bowers Field; Kent, OH	L 0–18		
November 23	at Indiana (PA)	Indiana, PA	L 0–21		

== Roster ==
The roster of the 1929 Kent State football team included the following:

- Deak Abbot, tackle
- William Disbro, halfback
- Elmer Dunlevy, guard
- Frank Fanelli, guard
- Louis Fogg, guard
- Clyde Hall, end
- James Hagerdon, end
- Chas Kilbourne, fullback and honorary captain
- James Mennow, halfback
- Ted Sapp, tackle
- Ward Seacrist, end
- Jake Searl, quarterback
- Arthur Stejskal, halfback
- Kermit Taylor, guard
- Alexander Young, halfback
