= 1929 DePaul Blue Demons football team =

American college football season

1929 DePaul Blue Demons football
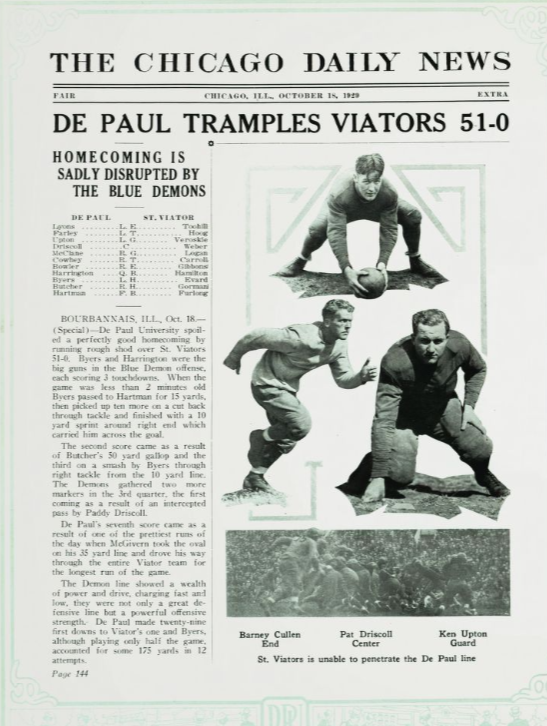
- DePaul's crushing defeat over St. Viator on October 18
- Conference: Independent
- Record: 2–5
- Head coach: Eddie Anderson (5th season)
- Home stadium: Soldier Field

1929 Midwestern college football independents records
	Conf.			Overall
Team	W	L	T	W		L		T
No. 1 Notre Dame		–		9	–	0	–	0
Detroit		–		7	–	1	–	1
Haskell		–		8	–	2	–	0
Loyola (IL)		–		5	–	2	–	1
Michigan State		–		5	–	3	–	0
John Carroll		–		5	–	3	–	1
Marquette		–		4	–	3	–	1
Butler		–		4	–	4	–	0
Michigan Tech		–		2	–	2	–	1
Wabash		–		4	–	5	–	0
Saint Louis		–		3	–	4	–	1
DePaul		–		2	–	7	–	0
Kent State		–		1	–	7	–	0
Valparaiso		–		1	–	7	–	0
Ball State		–		0	–	7	–	0
Rankings from Dickinson System

The 1929 DePaul Blue Demons football team was an American football team that represented DePaul University as an independent during the 1929 college football season. In its fifth season under head coach Eddie Anderson, the team compiled a 2–5 record and was outscored by a total of 124 to 114.

== Schedule ==
Date	Opponent	Site	Result	Attendance	Source
September 27	at Detroit	University of Detroit Stadium; Detroit, MI	L 7–27		
October 12	Michigan State Normal	Soldier Field; Chicago, IL	L 0–27		
October 18	at St. Viator	Bourbonnais, IL	W 51–0	2,500	
November 3	Loyola (IL)	Soldier Field; Chicago, IL	L 0–12	51,000	
November 17	St. Mary's (TX)	Soldier Field; Chicago, IL	L 12–19	8,000	
November 23	at Niagara	Falls field; Niagara Falls, NY	L 25–32		
November 30	at St. John's	Dexter Park; Jamaica, NY	W 19–7		
