= 1929 Michigan State Spartans football team =

American college football season

1929 Michigan State Spartans football
- Conference: Independent
- Record: 5–3
- Head coach: Jim Crowley (1st season)
- Captains: Fred Danziger; Vern C. Dickeson
- Home stadium: College Field

1929 Midwestern college football independents records
	Conf.			Overall
Team	W	L	T	W		L		T
No. 1 Notre Dame		–		9	–	0	–	0
Detroit		–		7	–	1	–	1
Haskell		–		8	–	2	–	0
Loyola (IL)		–		5	–	2	–	1
Michigan State		–		5	–	3	–	0
John Carroll		–		5	–	3	–	1
Marquette		–		4	–	3	–	1
Butler		–		4	–	4	–	0
Michigan Tech		–		2	–	2	–	1
Wabash		–		4	–	5	–	0
Saint Louis		–		3	–	4	–	1
DePaul		–		2	–	7	–	0
Kent State		–		1	–	7	–	0
Valparaiso		–		1	–	7	–	0
Ball State		–		0	–	7	–	0
Rankings from Dickinson System

The 1929 Michigan State Spartans football team represented Michigan State College (MSC) as an independent during the 1929 college football season. In their first year under head coach Jim Crowley, the Spartans compiled a 5–3 record and outscored their opponents 244 to 104.

== Schedule ==
Date	Opponent	Site	Result	Attendance	Source
September 28	Alma	College Field; East Lansing, MI	W 59–6		
October 5	at Michigan	Michigan Stadium; Ann Arbor, MI (rivalry)	L 0–17	30,494	
October 12	at Colgate	Whitnall Field; Hamilton, NY	L 0–31		
October 19	Adrian	College Field; East Lansing, MI	W 74–0		
October 26	NC State^{†}	College Field; East Lansing, MI	W 40–6		
November 2	Case	College Field; East Lansing, MI	W 38–0		
November 9	at Mississippi A&M	Municipal Stadium; Jackson, MS	W 33–19	< 2,000	
November 16	Detroit	College Field; East Lansing, MI	L 0–25		
^{†}Homecoming
