= 1929 Washington University Bears football team =

American college football season

1929 Washington University Bears football
- Conference: Missouri Valley Conference
- Record: 3–4–1 (0–1–1 MVC)
- Head coach: Albert Sharpe (2nd season)
- Home stadium: Francis Field

1929 Missouri Valley Conference football standings
	Conf.					Overall
Team	W		L		T	W		L		T
Drake $	3	–	0	–	1	5	–	3	–	1
Grinnell	1	–	0	–	2	5	–	1	–	2
Oklahoma A&M	1	–	1	–	0	4	–	3	–	2
Washington University	0	–	1	–	1	3	–	4	–	1
Creighton	0	–	3	–	0	2	–	6	–	0
$ – Conference champion

The 1929 Washington University Bears football team represented Washington University in St. Louis as a member of the Missouri Valley Conference (MVC) during the 1929 college football season. Led by second-year head coach Albert Sharpe, the Bears compiled an overall record of 3–4–1 with a mark of 0–1–1 in conference play, placing fourth in the MVC. Washington University played home games at Francis Field in St. Louis.

== Schedule ==
Date	Time	Opponent	Site	Result	Attendance	Source
October 5	2:30 p.m.	Illinois College*	Francis Field; St. Louis, MO	W 34–7		
October 12	8:00 p.m.	Drake	Francis Field; St. Louis, MO	L 0–20	12,000	
October 19		at Grinnell	Grinnell, IA	T 0–0	2,000	
October 26	8:00 p.m.	Drury*	Francis Field; St. Louis, MO	W 33–0	7,500	
November 2	2:00 p.m.	Carnegie Tech*	Francis Field; St. Louis, MO	L 0–19	6,000	
November 9	2:00 p.m.	Missouri*	Francis Field; St. Louis, MO	L 0–6	9,000	
November 16		at Kansas*	Memorial Stadium; Lawrence, KS	L 0–13	3,000	
November 28	2:00 p.m.	Saint Louis*	Francis Field; St. Louis, MO	W 7–0	14,000	
*Non-conference game; All times are in Central time
