= 1929 South Dakota Coyotes football team =

American college football season

1929 South Dakota Coyotes football
- Conference: North Central Conference
- Record: 4–4–1 (0–3–1 NCC)
- Head coach: Vincent E. Montgomery (3rd season)
- Home stadium: Inman Field

1929 North Central Conference football standings
	Conf.					Overall
Team	W		L		T	W		L		T
North Dakota $	4	–	0	–	0	9	–	1	–	0
South Dakota State	2	–	1	–	1	5	–	4	–	1
North Dakota Agricultural	1	–	1	–	2	4	–	3	–	2
Morningside	1	–	3	–	0	4	–	4	–	0
South Dakota	0	–	3	–	1	4	–	4	–	1
$ – Conference champion

The 1929 South Dakota Coyotes football team was an American football team that represented the University of South Dakota in the North Central Conference (NCC) during the 1929 college football season. In its third season under head coach Vincent E. Montgomery, the team compiled a 4–4–1 record (0–3–1 against NCC opponents), finished in fifth place out of five teams in the NCC, and outscored opponents by a total of 145 to 64. The team played its home games at Inman Field in Vermillion, South Dakota.

== Schedule ==
Date	Opponent	Site	Result	Attendance	Source
September 28	Yankton*	Inman Field; Vermillion, SD	W 13–0		
October 5	at Carleton*	Northfield, MN	W 6–0		
October 12	at North Dakota	Grand Forks, ND (rivalry)	L 6–13	3,000	
October 19	Western Union*	Inman Field; Vermillion, SD	W 42–0		
October 26	South Dakota State	Inman Field; Vermillion, SD (rivalry)	L 0–6		
November 2	at Army	Michie Stadium; West Point, NY	L 6–33	30,000	
November 9	Huron	Inman Field; Vermillion, SD	W 66–0		
November 16	North Dakota Agricultural	Inman Field; Vermillion, SD	T 6–6		
November 28	at Morningside	Sioux City, IA	L 0–6		
*Non-conference game
