= 1929 Detroit Titans football team =

American college football season

1929 Detroit Titans football
- Conference: Independent
- Record: 7–1–1
- Head coach: Gus Dorais (5th season)
- Home stadium: University of Detroit Stadium

1929 Midwestern college football independents records
	Conf.			Overall
Team	W	L	T	W		L		T
No. 1 Notre Dame		–		9	–	0	–	0
Detroit		–		7	–	1	–	1
Haskell		–		8	–	2	–	0
Loyola (IL)		–		5	–	2	–	1
Michigan State		–		5	–	3	–	0
John Carroll		–		5	–	3	–	1
Marquette		–		4	–	3	–	1
Butler		–		4	–	4	–	0
Michigan Tech		–		2	–	2	–	1
Wabash		–		4	–	5	–	0
Saint Louis		–		3	–	4	–	1
DePaul		–		2	–	7	–	0
Kent State		–		1	–	7	–	0
Valparaiso		–		1	–	7	–	0
Ball State		–		0	–	7	–	0
Rankings from Dickinson System

The 1929 Detroit Titans football team represented the University of Detroit in the 1929 college football season. Detroit outscored opponents by a combined total of 174 to 52 and finished with a 7–1–1 record in their fifth year under head coach and College Football Hall of Fame inductee, Gus Dorais. Significant games included a victories over Tulsa (21–6), West Virginia (36–0), Michigan State (25–0), a loss to Oregon State (14–7), and a tie with Marquette (6–6).

The team was led by halfback Lloyd Brazil of whom coach Dorais later said: "As far as I'm concerned, there were only three great collegiate backs in my lifetime -- Jim Thorpe, George Gipp and Lloyd Brazil."

Arthur "Bud" Boeringer and Harvey Brown were the line coaches. Johnny Fredericks was the freshman coach. Michael H. "Dad" Butler was the team's trainer.

== Schedule ==
Date	Opponent	Site	Result	Attendance	Source
September 28	DePaul	University of Detroit Stadium; Detroit, MI	W 27–7		
October 4	Dayton	University of Detroit Stadium; Detroit, MI	W 18–0	20,000	
October 12	Tulsa	University of Detroit Stadium; Detroit, MI	W 21–6		
October 26	Loyola (LA)	University of Detroit Stadium; Detroit, MI	W 20–6	> 18,000	
November 2	Marquette	University of Detroit Stadium; Detroit, MI	T 6–6	> 17,000	
November 9	at West Virginia	Mountaineer Field; Morgantown, WV	W 36–0	17,000	
November 16	at Michigan State	Spartan Stadium; East Lansing, MI	W 25–0		
November 23	Oregon State	University of Detroit Stadium; Detroit, MI	L 7–14		
November 30	Georgetown	University of Detroit Stadium; Detroit, MI	W 14–13	10,000	
