= 1929 Dayton Flyers football team =

American college football season

1929 Dayton Flyers football
- Conference: Ohio Athletic Conference
- Record: 4–5 (1–0 OAC)
- Head coach: Harry Baujan (7th season)
- Home stadium: University of Dayton Stadium

1929 Ohio Athletic Conference football standings
| | Conf. | | | | | Overall |
| Team | W | | L | | T | W | | L | | T |
|---|---|---|---|---|---|---|---|---|---|---|
| Muskingum $ | 5 | – | 0 | – | 0 | 6 | – | 2 | – | 0 |
| Heidelberg | 2 | – | 0 | – | 0 | 4 | – | 3 | – | 0 |
| Dayton | 1 | – | 0 | – | 0 | 4 | – | 5 | – | 0 |
| Akron | 7 | – | 1 | – | 0 | 9 | – | 1 | – | 0 |
| Baldwin–Wallace | 4 | – | 1 | – | 1 | 6 | – | 1 | – | 1 |
| Wooster | 5 | – | 2 | – | 1 | 5 | – | 2 | – | 1 |
| Mount Union | 4 | – | 2 | – | 1 | 5 | – | 3 | – | 1 |
| Oberlin | 3 | – | 2 | – | 0 | 4 | – | 4 | – | 0 |
| Western Reserve | 3 | – | 2 | – | 0 | 3 | – | 6 | – | 0 |
| Marietta | 2 | – | 2 | – | 0 | 3 | – | 5 | – | 0 |
| Kenyon | 2 | – | 3 | – | 0 | 3 | – | 6 | – | 0 |
| Otterbein | 3 | – | 5 | – | 0 | 3 | – | 5 | – | 0 |
| Case | 1 | – | 6 | – | 0 | 2 | – | 7 | – | 0 |
| Hiram | 1 | – | 6 | – | 0 | 1 | – | 7 | – | 0 |
| Ohio Northern | 0 | – | 4 | – | 1 | 2 | – | 6 | – | 1 |
| St. Xavier | 0 | – | 2 | – | 0 | 6 | – | 4 | – | 0 |
| Capital | 0 | – | 5 | – | 0 | 0 | – | 5 | – | 2 |
$ – Conference champion

The 1929 Dayton Flyers football team was an American football team that represented the University of Dayton as a member of the Ohio Athletic Conference during the 1929 college football season. In its seventh season under head coach Harry Baujan, the team compiled a 4–5 record. The season opened with the first night football game in school history, a 33-0 victory over Indiana Central.

== Schedule ==
| Date | Opponent | Site | Result | Attendance | Source |
|---|---|---|---|---|---|
| September 28 | Central Normal | University of Dayton Stadium; Dayton, OH | W 33–0 | 6,000 | |
| October 4 | at Detroit | University of Detroit Stadium; Detroit, MI | L 0–18 | 20,000 | |
| October 12 | Wilmington (OH) | University of Dayton Stadium; Dayton, OH | W 7–0 | | |
| October 19 | Boston College | University of Dayton Stadium; Dayton, OH | L 7–23 | | |
| October 26 | at Oglethorpe | Hermance Stadium; Atlanta, GA | L 12–20 | | |
| November 2 | Transylvania | University of Dayton Stadium; Dayton, OH | W 13–6 | | |
| November 9 | at St. Xavier | Corcoran Field; Cincinnati, OH | W 16–0 | 11,000 | |
| November 16 | Quantico Marines | University of Dayton Stadium; Dayton, OH | L 6–7 | | |
| November 28 | Wittenberg | University of Dayton Stadium; Dayton, OH | L 0–8 | | |
