= 1929 Saint Louis Billikens football team =

American college football season

1929 Saint Louis Billikens football
- Conference: Independent
- Record: 3–4–1
- Head coach: Hunk Anderson (2nd season)
- Captain: Joe Lintzenich
- Home stadium: Public Schools Stadium, Sportsman's Park

1929 Midwestern college football independents records
	Conf.			Overall
Team	W	L	T	W		L		T
No. 1 Notre Dame		–		9	–	0	–	0
Detroit		–		7	–	1	–	1
Haskell		–		8	–	2	–	0
Loyola (IL)		–		5	–	2	–	1
Michigan State		–		5	–	3	–	0
John Carroll		–		5	–	3	–	1
Marquette		–		4	–	3	–	1
Butler		–		4	–	4	–	0
Michigan Tech		–		2	–	2	–	1
Wabash		–		4	–	5	–	0
Saint Louis		–		3	–	4	–	1
DePaul		–		2	–	7	–	0
Kent State		–		1	–	7	–	0
Valparaiso		–		1	–	7	–	0
Ball State		–		0	–	7	–	0
Rankings from Dickinson System

The 1929 Saint Louis Billikens football team was an American football team that represented Saint Louis University as an independent during the 1929 college football season. In their second and final season under head coach Hunk Anderson, the Billikens compiled a 3–4–1 record and were outscored by a total of 55 to 31. The team played its home games at Public Schools Stadium (one game) and Sportsman's Park (three games) in St. Louis.

== Schedule ==
Date	Time	Opponent	Site	Result	Attendance	Source
October 5		Davis & Elkins	Public Schools Stadium; St. Louis, MO	L 13–22		
October 12		at Georgetown	Griffith Stadium; Washington, DC	L 0–13	7,000	
October 19		Oglethorpe	Sportsman's Park; St. Louis, MO	W 6–0	8,000	
October 26		at Loyola (IL)	Loyola Stadium; Chicago, IL	L 0–13		
November 2		Coe	Sportsman's Park; St. Louis, MO	W 6–0		
November 9		at Oklahoma A&M	Lewis Field; Stillwater, OK	T 0–0		
November 16		South Dakota State	Sportsman's Park; St. Louis, MO	W 6–0		
November 28	2:00 p.m.	at Washington University	Francis Field; St. Louis, MO	L 0–7	14,000	
All times are in Central time
