= 1929 Saint Mary's Redmen football team =

American college football season

1929 Saint Mary's Redmen football

MIAC champion
- Conference: Minnesota Intercollegiate Athletic Conference
- Record: 6–1–1 (3–0–1 MIAC)
- Head coach: Tom Skemp (11th season)

1929 Minnesota Intercollegiate Athletic Conference football standings
	Conf.					Overall
Team	W		L		T	W		L		T
Saint Mary's (MN) $	3	–	0	–	1	6	–	1	–	1
St. Olaf	4	–	1	–	0	7	–	1	–	0
St. Thomas (MN)	4	–	2	–	0	7	–	2	–	0
Gustavus Adolphus	3	–	2	–	0	6	–	2	–	0
Augsburg	3	–	2	–	1	4	–	2	–	1
Concordia (MN)	1	–	2	–	1	2	–	3	–	1
Hamline	2	–	4	–	0	2	–	6	–	0
Macalester	1	–	4	–	1	1	–	4	–	1
Saint John's (MN)	0	–	4	–	0	0	–	6	–	0
$ – Conference champion

The 1929 Saint Mary's Redmen football team represented Saint Mary's College—now known as Saint Mary's University of Minnesota—as a member of the Minnesota Intercollegiate Athletic Conference (MIAC) during the 1929 college football season. Led by 11th-year head coach Tom Skemp, the Redmen compiled an overall record of 6–1–1 with a mark of 3–0–1 in conference play, winning the MIAC title.

== Schedule ==
Date	Time	Opponent	Site	Result	Attendance	Source
September 20		at North Dakota*	Memorial Stadium; Grand Forks, ND	L 7–14	5,000	
October 5		Dubuque*	Winona, MN	W 78–0		
October 12		at Concordia (MN)	Moorhead, MN	T 13–13		
October 19		Fort Snelling*	Winona, MN	W 45–0		
October 26		Trinity (IA)*	Winona, MN	W 33–6		
November 9	2:00 p.m.	at Hamline	Norton Field; Saint Paul, MN	W 19–7		
November 16		Macalester	Winona, MN	W 45–7		
November 28		St. Thomas (MN)^{†}	Winona, MN	W 20–6	3,000	
*Non-conference game; ^{†}Homecoming; All times are in Central time
