= 1930 South Dakota Coyotes football team =

American college football season

1930 South Dakota Coyotes football
- Conference: North Central Conference
- Record: 1–5–2 (0–4 NCC)
- Head coach: Vincent E. Montgomery (4th season)
- Home stadium: Inman Field

1930 North Central Conference football standings
	Conf.					Overall
Team	W		L		T	W		L		T
North Dakota $	4	–	0	–	0	9	–	1	–	0
North Dakota Agricultural	3	–	1	–	0	7	–	2	–	0
Morningside	2	–	2	–	0	7	–	2	–	0
South Dakota State	1	–	3	–	0	2	–	6	–	1
South Dakota	0	–	4	–	0	1	–	5	–	2
$ – Conference champion

The 1930 South Dakota Coyotes football team was an American football team that represented the University of South Dakota in the North Central Conference (NCC) during the 1930 college football season. In its fourth and final season under head coach Vincent E. Montgomery, the team compiled a 1–5–2 record (0–4 against NCC opponents), finished in fifth place out of five teams in the NCC, and was outscored opponents by a total of 144 to 118. The team played its home games at Inman Field in Vermillion, South Dakota.

== Schedule ==
Date	Opponent	Site	Result	Source
September 27	Yankton*	Inman Field; Vermillion, SD	T 7–7	
October 3	at Augustana*	Sioux Falls, SD	W 86–0	
October 11	at North Dakota Agricultural	Dacotah Field; Fargo, ND	L 7–25	
October 17	at George Washington*	Griffith Stadium; Washington, DC	T 0–0	
October 25	at South Dakota State	State Field; Brookings, SD (rivalry)	L 6–13	
November 8	at Minnesota*	Memorial Stadium; Minneapolis, MN	L 0–59	
November 15	North Dakota	Inman Field; Vermillion, SD (rivalry)	L 0–21	
November 27	at Morningside	Sioux City, IA	L 12–19	
*Non-conference game
