= 1929 South Dakota State Jackrabbits football team =

American college football season

1929 South Dakota State Jackrabbits football
- Conference: North Central Conference
- Record: 5–4–1 (2–1–1 NCC)
- Head coach: Cy Kasper (2nd season)

1929 North Central Conference football standings
	Conf.					Overall
Team	W		L		T	W		L		T
North Dakota $	4	–	0	–	0	9	–	1	–	0
South Dakota State	2	–	1	–	1	5	–	4	–	1
North Dakota Agricultural	1	–	1	–	2	4	–	3	–	2
Morningside	1	–	3	–	0	4	–	4	–	0
South Dakota	0	–	3	–	1	4	–	4	–	1
$ – Conference champion

The 1929 South Dakota State Jackrabbits football team was an American football team that represented South Dakota State University in the North Central Conference (NCC) during the 1929 college football season. In its second season under head coach Cy Kasper, the team compiled a 5–4–1 record and outscored opponents by a total of 237 to 55.

== Schedule ==
Date	Opponent	Site	Result	Attendance	Source
September 27	at Wisconsin*	Camp Randall Stadium; Madison, WI	L 0–21		
October 5	Dakota Wesleyan*	Brookings, SD	W 48–0		
October 12	Morningside	Brookings, SD	W 38–0		
October 19	at North Dakota Agricultural	Fargo, ND (rivalry)	T 0–0		
October 26	South Dakota	Vermillion, SD (Dakota Day, rivalry)	W 6–0		
November 2	North Dakota	Brookings, SD	L 6–7		
November 16	at Saint Louis*	Sportsman's Park; St. Louis, MO	L 0–6		
November 24	at Loyola (IL)*	Loyola Stadium; Chicago, IL	L 7–21	6,000	
	Huron*	Brookings, SD	W 59–0		
	Western Union*	Brookings, SD	W 72–0		
*Non-conference game
