= 1929 St. Xavier Musketeers football team =

American college football season

1929 St. Xavier Musketeers football
- Conference: Ohio Athletic Conference
- Record: 6–4 (0–2 OAC)
- Head coach: Joseph A. Meyer (10th season)
- Home stadium: Corcoran Stadium

1929 Ohio Athletic Conference football standings
	Conf.					Overall
Team	W		L		T	W		L		T
Muskingum $	5	–	0	–	0	6	–	2	–	0
Heidelberg	2	–	0	–	0	4	–	3	–	0
Dayton	1	–	0	–	0	4	–	5	–	0
Akron	7	–	1	–	0	9	–	1	–	0
Baldwin–Wallace	4	–	1	–	1	6	–	1	–	1
Wooster	5	–	2	–	1	5	–	2	–	1
Mount Union	4	–	2	–	1	5	–	3	–	1
Oberlin	3	–	2	–	0	4	–	4	–	0
Western Reserve	3	–	2	–	0	3	–	6	–	0
Marietta	2	–	2	–	0	3	–	5	–	0
Kenyon	2	–	3	–	0	3	–	6	–	0
Otterbein	3	–	5	–	0	3	–	5	–	0
Case	1	–	6	–	0	2	–	7	–	0
Hiram	1	–	6	–	0	1	–	7	–	0
Ohio Northern	0	–	4	–	1	2	–	6	–	1
St. Xavier	0	–	2	–	0	6	–	4	–	0
Capital	0	–	5	–	0	0	–	5	–	2
$ – Conference champion

The 1929 St. Xavier Musketeers football team was an American football team that represented St. Xavier College (later renamed Xavier University) as a member of the Ohio Athletic Conference (OAC) during the 1929 college football season. In its tenth season under head coach Joseph A. Meyer, the team compiled a 6–4 record (0–2 against OAC opponents) and outscored all opponents by a total of 104 to 92.

Prior to the 1929 season, a new football stadium was built on the school's athletic campus at a cost of $300,00. The new stadium was commonly known in 1929 as Corcoran Field which was the preexisting name of the school's athletic field. It was also sometimes referred to as St. Xavier Stadium. The formal dedication was conducted on November 23, 1929, prior to the game against Denison. Cincinnati Mayor Murray Seasongood presented the stadium to the college president.

== Schedule ==
Date	Opponent	Site	Result	Attendance	Source
September 28	Transylvania*	Corcoran Field; Cincinnati, OH	W 14–6		
October 5	Georgetown (KY)*	Corcoran Field; Cincinnati, OH	W 25–13		
October 12	West Virginia Wesleyan*	Corcoran Field; Cincinnati, OH	W 19–12	6,200	
October 19	Centre*	Corcoran Field; Cincinnati, OH	W 14–0	7,000	
October 26	Quantico Marines*	Corcoran Field; Cincinnati, OH	W 13–7	10,000	
November 2	at Western Reserve	Dunn Field; Cleveland, OH	L 6–18		
November 9	Dayton^{†}	Corcoran Field; Cincinnati, OH	L 0–16	11,000	
November 16	Oglethorpe*	Corcoran Field; Cincinnati, OH	L 0–7	5,500	
November 23	Denison*	Corcoran Field; Cincinnati, OH	W 12–0		
November 28	Haskell*	Corcoran Field; Cincinnati, OH	L 0–13	13,000	
*Non-conference game; ^{†}Homecoming
