= 1929 North Dakota Flickertails football team =

American college football season

1929 North Dakota Flickertails football

NCC champion
- Conference: North Central Conference
- Record: 9–1 (4–0 NCC)
- Head coach: Charles A. West (2nd season)
- Captain: Stuart MacMillan
- Home stadium: Memorial Stadium

1929 North Central Conference football standings
| | Conf. | | | | | Overall |
| Team | W | | L | | T | W | | L | | T |
|---|---|---|---|---|---|---|---|---|---|---|
| North Dakota $ | 4 | – | 0 | – | 0 | 9 | – | 1 | – | 0 |
| South Dakota State | 2 | – | 1 | – | 1 | 5 | – | 4 | – | 1 |
| North Dakota Agricultural | 1 | – | 1 | – | 2 | 4 | – | 3 | – | 2 |
| Morningside | 1 | – | 3 | – | 0 | 4 | – | 4 | – | 0 |
| South Dakota | 0 | – | 3 | – | 1 | 4 | – | 4 | – | 1 |
$ – Conference champion

The 1929 North Dakota Flickertails football team, also known as the Nodaks, was an American football team that represented the University of North Dakota in the North Central Conference (NCC) during the 1929 college football season. In its second year under head coach Charles A. West, the team compiled a 9–1 record (4–0 against NCC opponents), won the conference championship, and outscored opponents by a total of 194 to 40.

== Schedule ==
| Date | Opponent | Site | Result | Attendance | Source |
|---|---|---|---|---|---|
| September 20 | Saint Mary's (MN)* | Memorial Stadium; Grand Forks, ND | W 14–7 | 5,000 | |
| September 28 | at Superior State* | | W 26–6 | | |
| October 4 | Haskell* | Memorial Stadium; Grand Forks, ND | L 6–13 | 7,000 | |
| October 5 | at Manitoba* | | W 27–1 | | |
| October 11 | South Dakota | Memorial Stadium; Grand Forks, ND | W 13–7 | | |
| October 19 | at Morningside | | W 26–0 | | |
| October 26 | North Dakota Agricultural | Memorial Stadium; Grand Forks, ND | W 14–0 | | |
| November 2 | at South Dakota State | | W 7–6 | | |
| November 16 | Creighton* | Memorial Stadium; Grand Forks, ND | W 54–0 | 8,000 | |
| November 30 | at Loyola (IL)* | Loyola Stadium; Chicago, IL | W 7–0 | | |
*Non-conference game
