= 1929 Iowa Wesleyan Tigers football team =

American college football season

1929 Iowa Wesleyan Tigers football
- Conference: Iowa Conference
- Record: 8–0 (5–0 Iowa)
- Head coach: Glen Bingham (4th season)

1929 Iowa Conference football standings
| | Conf. | | | | | Overall |
| Team | W | | L | | T | W | | L | | T |
|---|---|---|---|---|---|---|---|---|---|---|
| Iowa Wesleyan $ | 5 | – | 0 | – | 0 | 8 | – | 0 | – | 0 |
| Buena Vista | 3 | – | 1 | – | 1 | 6 | – | 1 | – | 2 |
| Columbia (IA) | 3 | – | 1 | – | 1 | 4 | – | 1 | – | 1 |
| Luther | 6 | – | 2 | – | 0 | 6 | – | 3 | – | 0 |
| Iowa State Teachers | 3 | – | 1 | – | 0 | 3 | – | 4 | – | 0 |
| Simpson (IA) | 4 | – | 2 | – | 0 | 6 | – | 3 | – | 0 |
| Morningside | 1 | – | 1 | – | 0 | 4 | – | 4 | – | 0 |
| Central (IA) | 2 | – | 4 | – | 0 | 3 | – | 4 | – | 1 |
| St. Ambrose | 1 | – | 3 | – | 0 | 3 | – | 4 | – | 1 |
| Upper Iowa | 1 | – | 3 | – | 1 | 1 | – | 5 | – | 1 |
| Parsons | 1 | – | 4 | – | 1 | 1 | – | 6 | – | 1 |
| Penn (IA) | 1 | – | 5 | – | 0 | 1 | – | 6 | – | 0 |
| Dubuque | 0 | – | 2 | – | 0 | 2 | – | 3 | – | 1 |
| Western Union | 0 | – | 2 | – | 0 | 1 | – | 7 | – | 1 |
$ – Conference champion; Upper Iowa's forfeit to Simpson on November 22 was not counted in conference standings.

The 1929 Iowa Wesleyan Tigers football team was an American football team that represented Iowa Wesleyan College—later known as Iowa Wesleyan University—as a member of the Iowa Conference during the 1929 college football season. Led by fourth-year head coach Glen Bingham, the Tigers compiled a perfect overall record of 8–0 with a mark of 5–0 in conference play, winning the Iowa Conference title.

== Schedule ==
| Date | Opponent | Site | Result | Source |
|---|---|---|---|---|
| October 5 | Graceland* | Mount Pleasant, IA | W 45–0 | |
| October 12 | St. Ambrose | Mount Pleasant, IA | W 6–0 | |
| October 18 | at Central (IA) | Pella, IA | W 24–7 | |
| October 26 | Carthage* | Mount Pleasant, IA | W 12–0 | |
| November 2 | at Penn (IA) | Oskaloosa, IA | W 13–0 | |
| November 15 | at Upper Iowa | Fayette, IA | W 26–0 | |
| November 22 | Culver-Stockton* | Mount Pleasant, IA | W 22–0 | |
| November 28 | at Parsons | Fairfield, IA | W 26–6 | |
*Non-conference game
