= John B. Law =

American football player, sports coach, and college athletics administrator

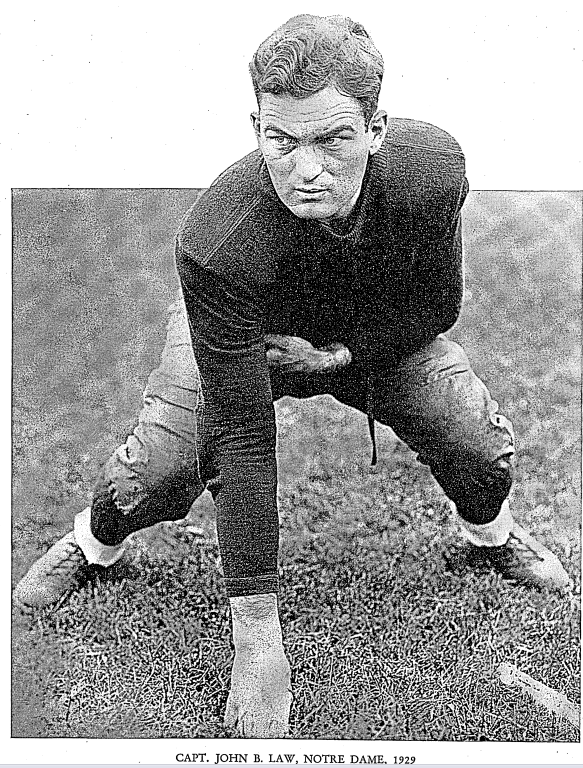
- Law in 1929

Biographical details
- Born: February 13, 1905; Yonkers, New York, U.S.
- Died: October 14, 1962 (aged 57); Tarrytown, New York, U.S.

Playing career

Football
- 1926–1929: Notre Dame
- 1930: Newark Tornadoes
- Position: Guard

Coaching career (HC unless noted)

Football
- 1930–1931: Manhattan
- 1946: Holy Cross (assistant)
- 1947: Notre Dame (assistant)
- 1948–1950: Mount St. Mary's

Baseball
- 1949–1952: Mount St. Mary's

Administrative career (AD unless noted)
- 1949–?: Mount St. Mary's

Head coaching record
- Overall: 14–23–3 (football); 23–30 (baseball)

Accomplishments and honors

Championships
- National (1929)

Awards
- Third-team All-American (1929)

John Brenden Law (February 13, 1905 – October 14, 1962) was an American football player, coach of football and baseball, and college athletics administrator. He was the third head football coach at Manhattan College and he held that position for two seasons, from 1930 until 1931. His career coaching record at Manhattan was 8–5–2. This ranks him fourth at Manhattan in total wins and first at Manhattan in winning percentage.

A native of Yonkers, New York, Law played college football at the University of Notre Dame and was captain of the undefeated 1929 Notre Dame Fighting Irish football team. After coaching at Manhattan he became the football and baseball coach at Sing Sing prison from 1932 to 1935.

Law also briefly played in the National Football League (NFL), appearing in one game as a starter for the Newark Tornadoes during the 1930 season.

== Head coaching record ==
=== Football ===
| Year | Team | Overall | Conference | Standing | Bowl/playoffs |
|---|---|---|---|---|---|
Manhattan Jaspers (Independent) (1930–1931)
| 1930 | Manhattan | 4–3–1 | | | |
| 1931 | Manhattan | 4–2–1 | | | |
| Manhattan: | | 8–5–2 | | | |
Mount St. Mary's Mountaineers (Mason–Dixon Conference) (1948–1950)
| 1948 | Mount St. Mary's | 2–6 | 2–1 | 4th | |
| 1949 | Mount St. Mary's | 3–6 | 1–1 | T–4th | |
| 1950 | Mount St. Mary's | 1–6–1 | 1–1 | T–4th | |
| Mount St. Mary's: | | 6–18–1 | 4–3 | | |
| Total: | | 14–23–3 | | | |
