= 1929 Ball State Cardinals football team =

American college football season

1929 Ball State Cardinals football
- Conference: Independent
- Record: 0–7
- Head coach: Paul B. Parker (2nd season)
- Home stadium: Normal Field

1929 Midwestern college football independents records
| | Conf. | | | Overall |
| Team | W | L | T | W | | L | | T |
|---|---|---|---|---|---|---|---|---|
| No. 1 Notre Dame | | – | | 9 | – | 0 | – | 0 |
| Detroit | | – | | 7 | – | 1 | – | 1 |
| Haskell | | – | | 8 | – | 2 | – | 0 |
| Loyola (IL) | | – | | 5 | – | 2 | – | 1 |
| Michigan State | | – | | 5 | – | 3 | – | 0 |
| John Carroll | | – | | 5 | – | 3 | – | 1 |
| Marquette | | – | | 4 | – | 3 | – | 1 |
| Butler | | – | | 4 | – | 4 | – | 0 |
| Michigan Tech | | – | | 2 | – | 2 | – | 1 |
| Wabash | | – | | 4 | – | 5 | – | 0 |
| Saint Louis | | – | | 3 | – | 4 | – | 1 |
| DePaul | | – | | 2 | – | 7 | – | 0 |
| Kent State | | – | | 1 | – | 7 | – | 0 |
| Valparaiso | | – | | 1 | – | 7 | – | 0 |
| Ball State | | – | | 0 | – | 7 | – | 0 |
Rankings from Dickinson System

The 1929 Ball State Cardinals football team was an American football team that represented Ball State University during the 1929 college football season. In their second and final season under head coach Paul B. Parker, Ball State compiled a 0–7 record and was outscored 43 to 200.

== Schedule ==
| Date | Opponent | Site | Result |
|---|---|---|---|
| September 28 | Indiana Central | Normal Field; Muncie, IN | L 0–7 |
| October 5 | at Western Kentucky State Normal | Bowling Green, KY | L 0–13 |
| October 12 | Franklin (IN) | Normal Field; Muncie, IN | L 6–12 |
| October 18 | at Central Normal | Danville, IN | L 12–14 |
| November 2 | Indiana JV | Normal Field; Muncie, IN | L 13–27 |
| November 9 | Notre Dame JV | Normal Field; Muncie, IN | L 6–81 |
| November 16 | at DePauw | Greencastle, IN | L 6–46 |
