= 1929 Creighton Bluejays football team =

American college football season

1929 Creighton Bluejays football
- Conference: Missouri Valley Conference
- Record: 2–6 (0–3 MVC)
- Head coach: Chet A. Wynne (7th season)
- Home stadium: Creighton Stadium

1929 Missouri Valley Conference football standings
	Conf.					Overall
Team	W		L		T	W		L		T
Drake $	3	–	0	–	1	5	–	3	–	1
Grinnell	1	–	0	–	2	5	–	1	–	2
Oklahoma A&M	1	–	1	–	0	4	–	3	–	2
Washington University	0	–	1	–	1	3	–	4	–	1
Creighton	0	–	3	–	0	2	–	6	–	0
$ – Conference champion

The 1929 Creighton Bluejays football team was an American football team that represented Creighton University as a member of the Missouri Valley Conference (MVC) during the 1929 college football season. In their seventh season under head coach Chet A. Wynne, the Bluejays compiled a 2–6 record (0–3 against MVC opponents) and was outscored by a total of 183 to 68. The team played its home games at Creighton Stadium in Omaha, Nebraska.

== Schedule ==
Date	Opponent	Site	Result	Attendance	Source
October 5	St. Mary's (KS)*	Creighton Stadium; Omaha, NE	W 18–0		
October 12	at Oklahoma*	Owen Field; Norman, OK	L 0–26		
October 19	at Oklahoma A&M	Lewis Field; Stillwater, OK	L 13–32		
October 26	Haskell^{†}*	Creighton Stadium; Omaha, NE	L 12–19		
November 2	at Drake	Des Moines, IA	L 12–34		
November 8	at Marquette*	Marquette Stadium; Milwaukee, WI	W 13–6	16,000	
November 16	North Dakota*	Creighton Stadium; Omaha, NE	L 0–54	8,000	
November 28	Grinnell	Creighton Stadium; Omaha, NE	L 0–12	< 4,000	
*Non-conference game; ^{†}Homecoming
