= 1929 Marquette Golden Avalanche football team =

American college football season

1929 Marquette Golden Avalanche football
- Conference: Independent
- Record: 4–3–1
- Head coach: Frank Murray (8th season)
- Home stadium: Marquette Stadium

1929 Midwestern college football independents records
	Conf.			Overall
Team	W	L	T	W		L		T
No. 1 Notre Dame		–		9	–	0	–	0
Detroit		–		7	–	1	–	1
Haskell		–		8	–	2	–	0
Loyola (IL)		–		5	–	2	–	1
Michigan State		–		5	–	3	–	0
John Carroll		–		5	–	3	–	1
Marquette		–		4	–	3	–	1
Butler		–		4	–	4	–	0
Michigan Tech		–		2	–	2	–	1
Wabash		–		4	–	5	–	0
Saint Louis		–		3	–	4	–	1
DePaul		–		2	–	7	–	0
Kent State		–		1	–	7	–	0
Valparaiso		–		1	–	7	–	0
Ball State		–		0	–	7	–	0
Rankings from Dickinson System

The 1929 Marquette Golden Avalanche football team was an American football team that represented Marquette University as an independent during the 1929 college football season. In its eighth season under head coach Frank Murray, the team compiled a 4–3–1 record and outscored all opponents by a total of 118 to 53. The team played its home games at Marquette Stadium in Milwaukee.

Frank Murray was Marquette's head football coach for 19 years and was posthumously inducted into the College Football Hall of Fame in 1983.

== Schedule ==
Date	Opponent	Site	Result	Attendance	Source
October 5	at Lawrence	Appleton, WI	W 40–0		
October 12	Grinnell	Marquette Stadium; Milwaukee, WI	L 7–9		
October 18	Iowa State^{†}	Marquette Stadium; Milwaukee, WI	W 14–6	19,000	
October 26	at Holy Cross	Fitton Field; Worcester, MA	L 0–7	8,000	
November 2	at Detroit	University of Detroit Stadium; Detroit, MI	T 6–6	> 17,000	
November 8	Creighton	Marquette Stadium; Milwaukee, WI	L 6–13	16,000	
November 16	Boston College	Marquette Stadium; Milwaukee, WI	W 20–6		
November 28	Kansas State	Marquette Stadium; Milwaukee, WI	W 25–6		
^{†}Homecoming
