= 1930 North Dakota Fighting Sioux football team =

American college football season

1930 North Dakota Fighting Sioux football

NCC champion
- Conference: North Central Conference
- Record: 9–1 (4–0 NCC)
- Head coach: Charles A. West (3rd season)
- Captain: Red Jarrett
- Home stadium: Memorial Stadium

1930 North Central Conference football standings
	Conf.					Overall
Team	W		L		T	W		L		T
North Dakota $	4	–	0	–	0	9	–	1	–	0
North Dakota Agricultural	3	–	1	–	0	7	–	2	–	0
Morningside	2	–	2	–	0	7	–	2	–	0
South Dakota State	1	–	3	–	0	2	–	6	–	1
South Dakota	0	–	4	–	0	1	–	5	–	2
$ – Conference champion

The 1930 North Dakota Fighting Sioux football team was an American football team that represented the University of North Dakota in the North Central Conference (NCC) during the 1930 college football season. In its second year under head coach Charles A. West, the team compiled a 9–1 record (4–0 against NCC opponents), won the conference championship, and outscored opponents by a total of 202 to 55.

== Schedule ==
Date	Opponent	Site	Result	Source
September 19	Saint Mary's (MN)*	Memorial Stadium; Grand Forks, ND	W 25–0	
September 26	at Superior State*	Superior, WI	W 39–0	
October 3	Davis & Elkins*	Memorial Stadium; Grand Forks, ND	W 16–0	
October 10	Morningside	Memorial Stadium; Grand Forks, ND	W 32–0	
October 18	South Dakota State	Memorial Stadium; Grand Forks, ND	W 21–0	
October 25	at North Dakota Agricultural	Fargo, ND	W 14–7	
November 1	at Army	Michie Stadium; West Point, NY	L 6–33	
November 7	at Duquesne	Forbes Field; Pittsburgh, PA	W 14–6	
November 15	at South Dakota	Vermillion, SD	W 21–0	
December 25	at Fire Department*	Los Angeles Memorial Coliseum; Los Angeles, CA	W 14–9	
*Non-conference game
