= 1929 Akron Zippers football team =

American college football season

1929 Akron Zippers football
- Conference: Ohio Athletic Conference
- Record: 9–1 (7–1 OAC)
- Head coach: Red Blair (3rd season)
- Captain: Harold Frye
- Home stadium: Buchtel Field

1929 Ohio Athletic Conference football standings
	Conf.					Overall
Team	W		L		T	W		L		T
Muskingum $	5	–	0	–	0	6	–	2	–	0
Heidelberg	2	–	0	–	0	4	–	3	–	0
Dayton	1	–	0	–	0	4	–	5	–	0
Akron	7	–	1	–	0	9	–	1	–	0
Baldwin–Wallace	4	–	1	–	1	6	–	1	–	1
Wooster	5	–	2	–	1	5	–	2	–	1
Mount Union	4	–	2	–	1	5	–	3	–	1
Oberlin	3	–	2	–	0	4	–	4	–	0
Western Reserve	3	–	2	–	0	3	–	6	–	0
Marietta	2	–	2	–	0	3	–	5	–	0
Kenyon	2	–	3	–	0	3	–	6	–	0
Otterbein	3	–	5	–	0	3	–	5	–	0
Case	1	–	6	–	0	2	–	7	–	0
Hiram	1	–	6	–	0	1	–	7	–	0
Ohio Northern	0	–	4	–	1	2	–	6	–	1
St. Xavier	0	–	2	–	0	6	–	4	–	0
Capital	0	–	5	–	0	0	–	5	–	2
$ – Conference champion

The 1929 Akron Zippers football team was an American football team that represented the University of Akron in the Ohio Athletic Conference (OAC) during the 1929 college football season. In its third season under head coach Red Blair, the team compiled a 9–1 record (7–1 in conference), shut out seven of ten opponents, and outscored all opponents by a total of 158 to 21. Quarterback Harold Frye was the team captain.

== Schedule ==
Date	Opponent	Site	Result	Source
September 28	at Toledo	Toledo, OH	W 26–0	
October 5	Kent State*	Buchtel Field; Akron, OH (rivalry)	W 25–0	
October 12	Wooster	Buchtel Field; Akron, OH	W 12–7	
October 19	Western Reserve	Buchtel Field; Akron, OH	W 14–7	
October 26	at Oberlin	Oberlin, OH	L 2–7	
November 2	Hiram*	Buchtel Field; Akron, OH	W 27–0	
November 9	Ohio Northern	Buchtel Field; Akron, OH	W 19–0	
November 16	at Case	Cleveland, OH	W 14–0	
November 23	at Baldwin–Wallace	Berea, OH	W 13–0	
November 27	at Mount Union	Alliance, OH	W 6–0	
*Non-conference game

== Players ==
The following 18 players received varsity letters for their participation on the team:

1. Delbert Auten
2. Larry Baker
3. Kenneth Cochrane, halfback
4. Hadley Ensign
5. Eugene Falls
6. Charles Fink
7. Vernon Flaugher
8. Ignatius "Igs" Florin, fullback
9. Harold Frye, quarterback
10. Paul "Peg" Frye, blocking halfback
11. Larry Hinkle
12. Albert Oldham
13. Willard Schmittkin
14. Albert Shollenberger
15. Carl Spessard
16. Harold Thomas
17. Miles Wilson
18. Frank Witwer
