= 1929 Drake Bulldogs football team =

American college football season

1929 Drake Bulldogs football

MVC champion
- Conference: Missouri Valley Conference
- Record: 5–3–1 (3–0–1 MVC)
- Head coach: Ossie Solem (9th season)
- Captain: Jack Barnes
- Home stadium: Drake Stadium

1929 Missouri Valley Conference football standings
	Conf.					Overall
Team	W		L		T	W		L		T
Drake $	3	–	0	–	1	5	–	3	–	1
Grinnell	1	–	0	–	2	5	–	1	–	2
Oklahoma A&M	1	–	1	–	0	4	–	3	–	2
Washington University	0	–	1	–	1	3	–	4	–	1
Creighton	0	–	3	–	0	2	–	6	–	0
$ – Conference champion

The 1929 Drake Bulldogs football team was an American football team that represented Drake University in the Missouri Valley Conference (MVC) during the 1929 college football season. In its ninth season under head coach Ossie Solem, the team compiled a 5–3–1 record (3–0–1 against MVC opponents), won the MVC championship, and outscored all opponents by a total of 145 to 79.

Key players included quarterback Lynn King and halfbacks Dick Nesbitt and Jack Barnes. Barnes was the team captain.

== Schedule ==
Date	Time	Opponent	Site	Result	Attendance	Source
September 28		Simpson*	Drake Stadium; Des Moines, IA	W 39–0		
October 4		Oklahoma A&M	Drake Stadium; Des Moines, IA	W 18–6		
October 12	8:00 p.m.	at Washington University	Francis Field; St. Louis, MO	W 20–0	12,000	
October 19		at Missouri*	Memorial Stadium; Columbia, MO	L 0–20	12,000	
October 26		Grinnell	Drake Stadium; Des Moines, IA	T 6–6		
November 1		Creighton	Drake Stadium; Des Moines, IA	W 34–12		
November 9		vs. Notre Dame*	Soldier Field; Chicago, IL	L 7–19	45,000–55,000	
November 16		at Iowa State*	State Field; Ames, IA	W 7–0		
November 23		at Temple*	Temple Stadium; Philadelphia, PA	L 14–16	15,000	
*Non-conference game; All times are in Central time
