= 1929 Oklahoma A&M Cowboys football team =

American college football season

1929 Oklahoma A&M Cowboys football
- Conference: Missouri Valley Conference
- Record: 4–3–2 (1–1 MVC)
- Head coach: Pappy Waldorf (1st season)
- Home stadium: Lewis Field

1929 Missouri Valley Conference football standings
| | Conf. | | | | | Overall |
| Team | W | | L | | T | W | | L | | T |
|---|---|---|---|---|---|---|---|---|---|---|
| Drake $ | 3 | – | 0 | – | 1 | 5 | – | 3 | – | 1 |
| Grinnell | 1 | – | 0 | – | 2 | 5 | – | 1 | – | 2 |
| Oklahoma A&M | 1 | – | 1 | – | 0 | 4 | – | 3 | – | 2 |
| Washington University | 0 | – | 1 | – | 1 | 3 | – | 4 | – | 1 |
| Creighton | 0 | – | 3 | – | 0 | 2 | – | 6 | – | 0 |
$ – Conference champion

The 1929 Oklahoma A&M Cowboys football team represented Oklahoma A&M College in the 1929 college football season. This was the 29th year of football at A&M and the first under Pappy Waldorf. The Cowboys played their home games at Lewis Field in Stillwater, Oklahoma. They finished the season 4–3–2, 1–1–0 in the Missouri Valley Conference.

== Schedule ==
| Date | Opponent | Site | Result | Attendance | Source |
|---|---|---|---|---|---|
| September 27 | Northwestern Oklahoma State* | Lewis Field; Stillwater, OK | W 12–0 | | |
| October 4 | at Drake | Drake Stadium; Des Moines, IA | L 6–18 | | |
| October 11 | at Oklahoma City* | Clark Field; Oklahoma City, OK | W 18–0 | | |
| October 19 | Creighton | Lewis Field; Stillwater, OK | W 32–13 | | |
| October 26 | West Virginia*^{†} | Lewis Field; Stillwater, OK | L 6–9 | 10,000 | |
| November 2 | Tulsa* | Lewis Field; Stillwater, OK (rivalry) | W 20–0 | | |
| November 9 | Saint Louis* | Lewis Field; Stillwater, OK | T 0–0 | | |
| November 23 | at Oklahoma* | Memorial Stadium; Norman, OK (Bedlam) | T 7–7 | | |
| November 28 | Arkansas* | Lewis Field; Stillwater, OK | L 6–32 | | |
*Non-conference game; ^{†}Homecoming
