= 1930 North Dakota Agricultural Bison football team =

American college football season

1930 North Dakota Agricultural Bison football
- Conference: North Central Conference
- Record: 7–2 (3–1 NCC)
- Head coach: Casey Finnegan (2nd season)
- Captain: Leo May
- Home stadium: Dacotah Field

1930 North Central Conference football standings
	Conf.					Overall
Team	W		L		T	W		L		T
North Dakota $	4	–	0	–	0	9	–	1	–	0
North Dakota Agricultural	3	–	1	–	0	7	–	2	–	0
Morningside	2	–	2	–	0	7	–	2	–	0
South Dakota State	1	–	3	–	0	2	–	6	–	1
South Dakota	0	–	4	–	0	1	–	5	–	2
$ – Conference champion

The 1930 North Dakota Agricultural Bison football team was an American football team that represented North Dakota Agricultural College (now known as North Dakota State University) in the North Central Conference (NCC) during the 1930 college football season. In its second season under head coach Casey Finnegan, the team compiled a 7–2 record (3–1 against NCC opponents) and finished in second place out of five teams in the NCC. The team played its home games at Dacotah Field in Fargo, North Dakota.

== Schedule ==
Date	Opponent	Site	Result	Attendance	Source
September 19	Concordia (MN)*	Dacotah Field; Fargo, ND	W 6–0	3,800	
September 27	Davis & Elkins*	Dacotah Field; Fargo, ND	W 21–13		
October 4	St. Thomas (MN)*	Dacotah Field; Fargo, ND	W 13–6		
October 10	South Dakota	Dacotah Field; Fargo, ND	W 25–7		
October 18	at Morningside	Bass Field; Sioux City, IA	W 12–0	2,500	
October 25	North Dakota	Dacotah Field; Fargo, ND (rivalry)	L 7–14		
November 1	Moorhead State*	Dacotah Field; Fargo, ND	W 39–21		
November 8	at Michigan State*	College Field; East Lansing, MI	L 11–19	9,000	
November 15	at South Dakota State	State Field; Brookings, SD (rivalry)	W 24–0		
*Non-conference game
