= 1929 Loyola Ramblers football team =

American college football season

1929 Loyola Ramblers football
- Conference: Independent
- Record: 5–2–1
- Head coach: Dan Lamont (1st season)
- Captain: Corny Collins

1929 Midwestern college football independents records
	Conf.			Overall
Team	W	L	T	W		L		T
No. 1 Notre Dame		–		9	–	0	–	0
Detroit		–		7	–	1	–	1
Haskell		–		8	–	2	–	0
Loyola (IL)		–		5	–	2	–	1
Michigan State		–		5	–	3	–	0
John Carroll		–		5	–	3	–	1
Marquette		–		4	–	3	–	1
Butler		–		4	–	4	–	0
Michigan Tech		–		2	–	2	–	1
Wabash		–		4	–	5	–	0
Saint Louis		–		3	–	4	–	1
DePaul		–		2	–	7	–	0
Kent State		–		1	–	7	–	0
Valparaiso		–		1	–	7	–	0
Ball State		–		0	–	7	–	0
Rankings from Dickinson System

The 1929 Loyola Ramblers football team was an American football team that represented Loyola University Chicago as an independent during the 1929 college football season. The team compiled a 5–2–1 record.

The team played its home games at the newly constructed Loyola Stadium, located on the school's campus in Rogers Park. The stadium was dedicated on October 12, 1929, prior to a game against Coe College. The field was built at a cost of $25,000, and the stands on the west side of the field cost $60,000. The seating capacity was 10,000.

Daniel J. Lamont was the team's head coach and the school's athletic director. Key players included halfbacks Marty Griffen and Les Malloy (sometimes spelled Molloy) and fullback Tommy Flynn. Quarterback Corny Collins was the captain.

== Schedule ==
Date	Opponent	Site	Result	Attendance	Source
October 5	Oklahoma City	Loyola Stadium; Chicago, IL	W 12–0		
October 12	Coe	Loyola Stadium; Chicago, IL	W 6–0		
October 19	at Duquesne	Forbes Field; Pittsburgh, PA	L 6–7	4,500	
October 28	Saint Louis^{†}	Loyola Stadium; Chicago, IL	W 12–0		
November 3	vs. DePaul	Soldier Field; Chicago, IL	W 13–0	51,000	
November 11	at Loyola (LA)	Loyola Stadium; New Orleans, LA	T 6–6	8,000	
November 24	South Dakota State	Loyola Stadium; Chicago, IL	W 21–7	6,000	
November 30	North Dakota	Loyola Stadium; Chicago, IL	L 0–7		
^{†}Homecoming
