= 1929 Haskell Indians football team =

American college football season

1929 Haskell Indians football
- Conference: Independent
- Record: 8–2
- Head coach: William Henry Dietz (1st season)
- Captain: Louis Weller
- Home stadium: Haskell Stadium

1929 Midwestern college football independents records
	Conf.			Overall
Team	W	L	T	W		L		T
No. 1 Notre Dame		–		9	–	0	–	0
Detroit		–		7	–	1	–	1
Haskell		–		8	–	2	–	0
Loyola (IL)		–		5	–	2	–	1
Michigan State		–		5	–	3	–	0
John Carroll		–		5	–	3	–	1
Marquette		–		4	–	3	–	1
Butler		–		4	–	4	–	0
Michigan Tech		–		2	–	2	–	1
Wabash		–		4	–	5	–	0
Saint Louis		–		3	–	4	–	1
DePaul		–		2	–	7	–	0
Kent State		–		1	–	7	–	0
Valparaiso		–		1	–	7	–	0
Ball State		–		0	–	7	–	0
Rankings from Dickinson System

The 1929 Haskell Indians football team was an American football that represented the Haskell Institute (now known as Haskell Indian Nations University) during the 1929 college football season. In its first year under head coach William Henry Dietz, the team compiled a 8–2 record. Halfback Louis Weller, a Caddo Indian, was the team captain. The team played its two home games at night at Haskell Stadium in Lawrence, Kansas.

== Schedule ==
Date	Opponent	Site	Result	Attendance	Source
September 27	Friends	Haskell Stadium; Lawrence, KS	W 38–7		
October 4	at North Dakota	Memorial Stadium; Grand Forks, ND	W 13–6	7,000	
October 11	at Baker	Baldwin, KS	W 7–0		
October 19	at Butler	Indianapolis, IN	W 13–6		
October 26	at Creighton	Creighton Stadium; Omaha, NE	W 19–13		
November 2	at Loyola (LA)	Loyola Stadium; New Orleans, LA	L 12–19		
November 18	Kirksville State	Haskell Stadium; Lawrence, KS	W 22–6		
November 23	at Duquesne	Forbes Field; Pittsburgh, PA	L 6–7	5,000	
November 28	at St. Xavier	Corcoran Field; Cincinnati, OH	W 13–0	13,000	
December 7	at Tulsa*	McNulty Park; Tulsa, OK	W 20–14	5,000	
*Non-conference game

== Roster ==
Official team photo of the 1929 Haskell Indians football team.
