= 1929 North Dakota Agricultural Bison football team =

American college football season

1929 North Dakota Agricultural Bison football
- Conference: North Central Conference
- Record: 4–3–2 (1–1–2 NCC)
- Head coach: Casey Finnegan (1st season)
- Captain: Stafford "Cod" Ordahl
- Home stadium: Dacotah Field

1929 North Central Conference football standings
	Conf.					Overall
Team	W		L		T	W		L		T
North Dakota $	4	–	0	–	0	9	–	1	–	0
South Dakota State	2	–	1	–	1	5	–	4	–	1
North Dakota Agricultural	1	–	1	–	2	4	–	3	–	2
Morningside	1	–	3	–	0	4	–	4	–	0
South Dakota	0	–	3	–	1	4	–	4	–	1
$ – Conference champion

The 1929 North Dakota Agricultural Bison football team was an American football team that represented North Dakota Agricultural College (now known as North Dakota State University) in the North Central Conference (NCC) during the 1929 college football season. In its first season under head coach Casey Finnegan, the team compiled a 4–3–2 record (1–1–2 against NCC opponents) and finished in third place out of five teams in the NCC. The team played its home games at Dacotah Field in Fargo, North Dakota.

== Schedule ==
Date	Opponent	Site	Result
September 28	Concordia (MN)*	Dacotah Field; Fargo, ND	W 13–6
October 5	at Superior State*	Superior, WI	W 26–7
October 12	at Moorhead State*	Moorhead, MN	W 21–6
October 19	South Dakota State	Dacotah Field; Fargo, ND (rivalry)	T 0–0
October 26	at North Dakota	Memorial Stadium; Grand Forks, ND (rivalry)	L 0–14
November 2	Morningside	Dacotah Field; Fargo, ND	W 21–0
November 9	at Mount St. Charles*	Helena, MT	L 6–7
November 16	at South Dakota	Inman Field; Vermillion, SD	T 6–6
November 22	at Montana State*	Bozeman, MT	L 0–6
*Non-conference game
