= Bonniwell Trophy =

College Football Award

Eugene C. Bonniwell National Football Trophy of America
- Sport: College football
- Awarded for: National Championship
- Sponsored by: Veteran Athletes of Philadelphia
- Country: United States

History
- First award: 1924

The Eugene C. Bonniwell National Football Trophy of America was a trophy presented in the United States to the college football team recognized as national champions by the directors of the Veteran Athletes of Philadelphia.

The trophy was awarded by the Veteran Athletes of Philadelphia, an organization made up of former Olympic and intercollegiate athletes.

The trophy was awarded only upon unanimous vote by the directors of the organization for a single national champion. It was first awarded to Notre Dame in 1924, after having been created around 1919 and unawarded for 5 years.

In 1930 the Madeleine C. Bonniwell Memorial Football Trophy was awarded for the same national championship honors.

== Winners ==
| Season | Team | Head coach | Record |
|---|---|---|---|
| 1924 | Notre Dame | Knute Rockne | 10–0 |
| 1929 | Notre Dame | Knute Rockne | 9–0 |
| 1930 | Notre Dame | Knute Rockne | 10–0 |
