= Fred Danziger =

American football player (1906–1948)

Profile
- Position: Fullback

Personal information
- Born: January 12, 1906; Detroit, Michigan, U.S.
- Died: October 18, 1948 (age 42); Dearborn, Michigan, U.S.
- Listed height: 5 ft 11 in (1.80 m)
- Listed weight: 175 lb (79 kg)

Career information
- High school: Western (Detroit, MI)
- College: Michigan State University

Career history
- Cleveland Indians (1931)
- Stats at Pro Football Reference

Frederick W. Danziger (January 12, 1906 – October 18, 1948) was an American football player. Danziger was born in 1906 in Detroit and attended Detroit's Western High School. He played college football as a halfback for Michigan State College (later known as Michigan State University) and was co-captain of the 1929 Michigan State Spartans football team. He was seriously injured in October 1929 with a fractured bone in the lumbar region. He later played professional football in the National Football League (NFL) for the Cleveland Indians during the 1931 season. He later worked as a salesman for a biscuit company. He died in 1948 at age 42.
