= Mike Koken =

American football player (1909–1962)

- Koken, circa 1931

Profile
- Positions: Quarterback, halfback

Personal information
- Born: April 5, 1909; Butler, Pennsylvania, U.S.
- Died: April 15, 1962 (aged 53); South Bend, Indiana, U.S.
- Listed height: 5 ft 11 in (1.80 m)
- Listed weight: 185 lb (84 kg)

Career information
- High school: South (OH)
- College: Notre Dame

Career history
- Chicago Cardinals (1933)

Awards and highlights
- 2× National champion (1929, 1930)

Career statistics
- Rushing yards: 65
- Receiving yards: 44
- Passing yards: 74

Michael Richard Koken (April 5, 1909 – April 15, 1962) was an American football player and coach. He played at the quarterback and halfback positions for Notre Dame from 1929 to 1932 and in the National Football League (NFL) for the Chicago Cardinals in 1933. He also coached football at John Caroll University and North Carolina State University and participated in the D-Day landings as a member of the United States Army.

== Early life ==
Koken was born in Butler, Pennsylvania, in 1909. He attended South High School in Youngstown, Ohio. He was the star of Youngstown South's undefeated 1927 football team.

== Notre Dame ==
He played college football at Notre Dame from 1929 to 1932. Koken was known as being small and elusive. In 1931, The South Bend Tribune wrote: "Little Mike Koken was a swirling, twisting, elusive demon taking the ball for long gains time after time. He ran hard and low and several times it took two and three tacklers to bring him down." He suffered three cracked vertebrae in a 1931 game against Navy, but returned to the Notre Dame backfield in 1932.

== Professional football ==
In 1933, he played professional football in the National Football League (NFL) for the Chicago Cardinals. He started the season at quarterback and was moved to halfback in November. He appeared in nine NFL games, four as a starter. He totaled 74 passing yards and one passing touchdown, 65 rushing yards, and kicked an extra point.

== Coaching, World War II, and later years ==
After his playing career ended, he served as backfield coach to the John Carroll University football team and as the school's head basketball coach. In 1936, he accepted a position as the backfield coach for North Carolina State's football team.

He worked for Tucker Freight Lines of South Bend, Indiana, from 1938 until his death in 1962. He also served in the Army during World War II, where he was part of the second wave on D-Day. Koken wrote that playing for Knute Rockne prepared him for combat:

When the going gets rough over here, I always recall Rock's words to me before and during a big game: 'Keep cool, calm and collected.' ... When we landed here, I had to march eight miles with a full pack, after wading ashore under fire in water up to my waist. It's a tough and rugged life, but when you've had three years of varsity football at Notre Dame, with every team you meet shooting at you, then you're prepared for the toughest stuff the Jerries can throw at you.

He later sustained serious injuries while fighting in France in August 1944. He died of a heart attack at age 53 while at the South Bend Country Club.
