= Jack Cannon (American football) =

American football player (1907–1967)

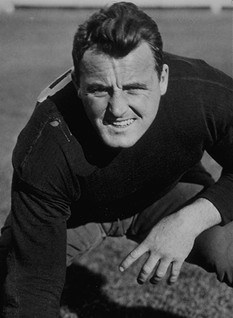

No. 19
- Position: Guard

Personal information
- Born: April 19, 1907; Columbus, Ohio, U.S.
- Died: November 12, 1967 (aged 60); Columbus, Ohio, U.S.
- Listed height: 5 ft 11 in (1.80 m)
- Listed weight: 193 lb (88 kg)

Career information
- College: Notre Dame (1927–1929)

Awards and highlights
- National champion (1929); Consensus All-American (1929)
- College Football Hall of Fame

Jack Cannon (April 19, 1907 – November 12, 1967) was an American football player. He was elected to the College Football Hall of Fame in 1965. He died of a heart attack on November 12, 1967, in Columbus, Ohio. Grantland Rice selected him for an all-time All-America team in 1939.
