= 1929 Notre Dame Fighting Irish football team =

American college football season

1929 Notre Dame Fighting Irish football
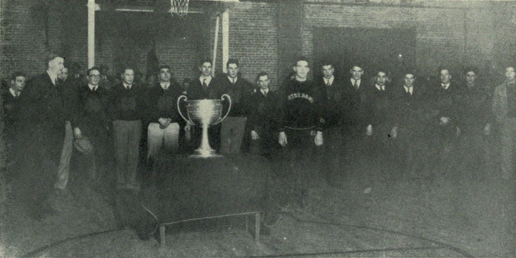
- Team receiving the Albert Russel Erskine Trophy for the national championship.

National champion (Dickinson, Helms, et al.)
- Conference: Independent
- Record: 9–0
- Head coach: Knute Rockne (12th season)
- Offensive scheme: Notre Dame Box
- Base defense: 7–2–2
- Captain: John B. Law
- Home stadium: Soldier Field

1929 Midwestern college football independents records
	Conf.			Overall
Team	W	L	T	W		L		T
No. 1 Notre Dame		–		9	–	0	–	0
Detroit		–		7	–	1	–	1
Haskell		–		8	–	2	–	0
Loyola (IL)		–		5	–	2	–	1
Michigan State		–		5	–	3	–	0
John Carroll		–		5	–	3	–	1
Marquette		–		4	–	3	–	1
Butler		–		4	–	4	–	0
Michigan Tech		–		2	–	2	–	1
Wabash		–		4	–	5	–	0
Saint Louis		–		3	–	4	–	1
DePaul		–		2	–	7	–	0
Kent State		–		1	–	7	–	0
Valparaiso		–		1	–	7	–	0
Ball State		–		0	–	7	–	0
Rankings from Dickinson System

The 1929 Notre Dame Fighting Irish football team was an American football team that represented the University of Notre Dame as an independent during the 1929 college football season. In their 12th year under head coach Knute Rockne, the Irish compiled a perfect 9–0 record and outscored opponents by a total of 145 to 38, with four shutouts.

The Dickinson System rated Notre Dame No. 1 with 25.00 points, ahead of No. 2 Purdue (23.60), both from the State of Indiana. In later analyses, Notre Dame was also selected as the 1929 national champion by Billingsley Report, Boand System, Dickinson System, Dunkel System, College Football Researchers Association, Helms Athletic Foundation, National Championship Foundation, Poling System, and Jeff Sagarin's ELO-Chess system.

Two Notre Dame players, quarterback Frank Carideo and guard Jack Cannon, were consensus first-team players on the 1929 All-America college football team.

Coach Rockne was stricken with what was variously described as an infection or a blood clot in his right leg prior to the second game of the season against Navy. He was able to attend only two of the remaining games on the side lines. Assistant coach Tom Lieb served as the interim head coach.

With the razing of Cartier Field, the team played no home games in South Bend, Indiana. Three "home" games were played at Soldier Field in Chicago. The new Notre Dame Stadium opened for the 1930 season.

== Schedule ==
Date	Opponent	Site	Result	Attendance	Source
October 5	at Indiana	Memorial Stadium; Bloomington, IN	W 14–0	16,111–22,000	
October 12	vs. Navy	Municipal Stadium; Baltimore, MD (rivalry)	W 14–7	64,681–71,000	
October 19	vs. Wisconsin	Soldier Field; Chicago, IL	W 19–0	85,000–90,000	
October 26	at Carnegie Tech	Pitt Stadium; Pittsburgh, PA	W 7–0	65,000–66,000	
November 2	at Georgia Tech	Grant Field; Atlanta, GA (rivalry)	W 26–6	22,000	
November 9	vs. Drake	Soldier Field; Chicago, IL	W 19–7	45,000–55,000	
November 16	vs. USC	Soldier Field; Chicago, IL (rivalry)	W 13–12	120,000–123,000	
November 23	at Northwestern	Dyche Stadium; Evanston, IL (rivalry)	W 26–6	50,000	
November 30	vs. Army	Yankee Stadium; Bronx, NY (rivalry)	W 7–0	79,408–82,000	

== Personnel ==
=== Players ===
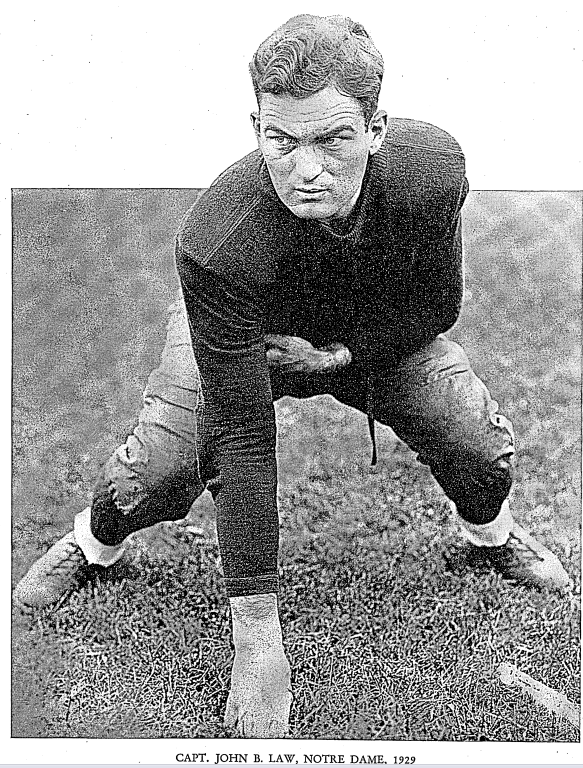
John B. Law

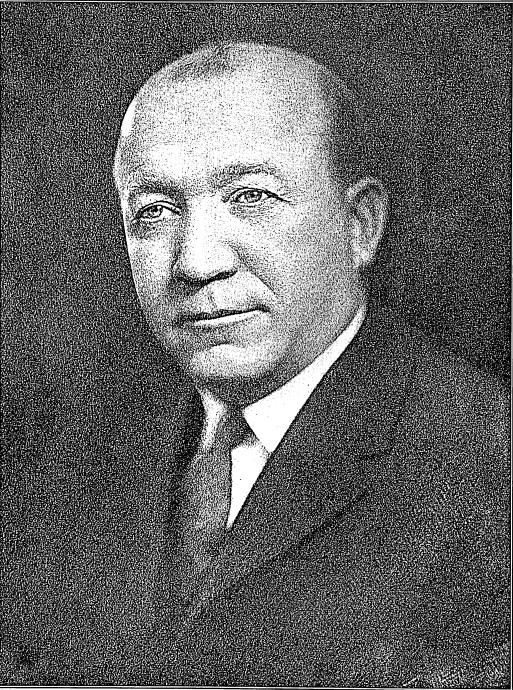
Knute Rockne

- Roy Bailie, end, 5'11", 163 pounds
- Bernard Bloemer, guard, 5'9", 162 pounds
- Gus Bondi, guard, 5'9", 175 pounds
- Bob Brannon, halfback, 5'9", 155 pounds
- Martin Brill, halfback, 5'11", 181 pounds
- Dan Cannon, halfback, 5'7-1/2", 163 pounds
- Jack Cannon, guard, 5'11", 193 pounds
- Jack Carberry, end, 6', 175 pounds
- Frank Carideo, quarterback, 5'7", 172 pounds
- James Carmody, tackle, 6', 190 pounds
- William Cassidy, guard, 5'9, 172 pounds
- Vincent Cavanaugh, center, 5'11", 181 pounds
- Bill Christman, quarterback, 5'7", 152 pounds
- Ed Collins, end, 6', 169 pounds
- John Colrick, end, 6', 175 pounds
- Tom Conley, end, 5'11", 170 pounds
- Pat Conway, fullback, 5'10", 162 pounds
- Carl Cronin, halfback, 5'7", 155 pounds
- Al Culver, tackle, 6'2-1/2", 212 pounds
- Richard Donoghue, tackle, 6'2", 220 pounds
- Bernard Donoghue, halfback, 5'10-1/2", 161 pounds
- John Elder, halfback, 5'8", 154 pounds
- Al Gebert, quarterback, 5'8", 160 pounds
- Jim Griffin, end, 6'1", 178 pounds
- Al Grisanti, end, 5'9", 155 pounds
- Norm Herwit, guard, 5'9", 185 pounds
- Paul Host, end, 5'11", 165 pounds
- Al Howard, fullback, 5'10", 160 pounds
- George Izoe, tackle, 6', 185 pounds
- Clarence Kaplan, halfback, 5'10", 158 pounds
- Tom L. Kassis, guard, 5'11", 185 pounds
- Bernard Keeney, quarterback, 5'8", 141 pounds
- Tom Kenneally, quarterback, 5'7", 145 pounds
- Frank Kersjes, end, 5'11", 180 pounds
- Mike Koken, halfback, 5'10", 165 pounds
- Frank Kosky, end, 6', 174 pounds
- Theodore Kremer, fullback, 5'10", 177 pounds
- John B. Law, guard and captain, 5'9", 163 pounds
- Bernie Leahy, halfback, 5'11", 178 pounds
- Frank Leahy, tackle, 5'11", 183 pounds
- Tom Listzwan, fullback, 5'8", 158 pounds
- Joseph Locke, guard, 5'10", 165 pounds
- Jim Lyons, guard, 5'11", 170 pounds
- Henry Mahoney, end, 5'10", 165 pounds
- John Manley, tackle, 5'11", 180 pounds
- Robert Massey, guard, 5'10", 165 pounds
- Art McManmon, tackle, 6'2", 201 pounds
- Regis McNamara, tackle, 6', 165 pounds
- Bert Metzger, guard, 5'9", 165 pounds
- Tim Moynihan, center, 6'1", 195 pounds
- Larry Mullins, fullback, 6', 175 pounds
- Emmett Murphy, quarterback, 5'10", 158 pounds
- Tom Murphy, end, 6'1", 185 pounds
- Joe Nash, center, 5'10-1/2", 177 pounds
- Ed O'Brien, halfback, 5'10", 172 pounds
- John O'Brien, end, 6'2", 180 pounds
- Paul O'Connor, fullback, 5'9", 175 pounds
- P. Provissero, guard, 5'8", 194 pounds
- Fred Reiman, center, 6'2", 186 pounds
- John Rogers, center, 5'9", 172 pounds
- Joe Savoldi, fullback, 5'11", 192 pounds
- Charles Schwartz, tackle, 5'9", 160 pounds
- Marchmont Schwartz, halfback, 5'10", 161 pounds
- Al Seymour, guard, 5'10", 174 pounds
- Dinny Shay, fullback, 5'9", 160 pounds
- Joe Thornton, tackle, 5'9-1/2", 182 pounds
- Ted Twomey, tackle, 6', 195 pounds
- H. M. Vezie, end, 6', 175 pounds
- George Vlk, end, 6', 170 pounds
- Terrance Wharton, tackle, 6'1", 187 pounds
- Vincent Whelan, guard, 6', 165 pounds
- Aubrey Williams, fullback, 6'1", 181 pounds
- Thomas Yarr, center, 5'10", 185 pounds
- John Yelland, center, 6', 173 pounds
- Abe Zoss, guard, 5'11", 184 pounds

=== Staff ===
- Knute Rockne, head coach
- Tom Lieb, assistant coach and acting head coach
- Thomas A. Mills, assistant coach and scout
- John "Ike" Voedisch, assistant coach (end)
- Jack Chevigny, assistant coach (backfield)
- William Jones, freshman coach

== Awards and honors ==
- QB Frank Carideo (unanimous All-American)
- G Jack Cannon (All-American)
- T Ted Twommey (All-American)
