= 1929 college football season =

American college football season

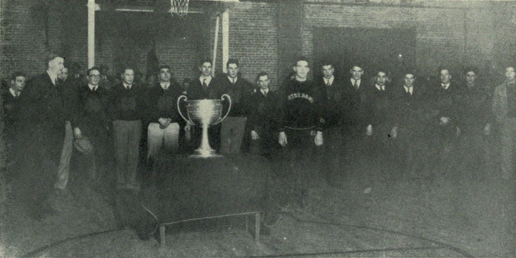
- Notre Dame receiving the Albert Russel Erskine Trophy (for being named national champions)
- Number of bowls: 1
- Bowl games: January 1, 1930
- Champion(s): Notre Dame (Note: Dickinson System (received Rissman Trophy), Dunkel System, Houlgate System, per Erksine poll (received Erskine Trophy), unanimous consensus of board of the Veteran Athletes of Philadelphia (awarded Bonniwell Trophy), Billingsley Report, Boand System, College Football Researchers Association, Helms Athletic Foundation, National Championship Foundation, Poling System, Sagarin Ratings Elo chess method); USC (Note: per Berryman QPRS, and Sagarin Ratings Predictor method) (not claimed); Pittsburgh (Note: per Parke H. Davis (Spalding's Official Foot Ball Guide))

The 1929 college football season saw a number of unbeaten and untied teams. Purdue, Tulane, Notre Dame, Western Maryland, and Pittsburgh all finished the regular season with wins over all their opponents. Notre Dame was recognized as national champion by all three of the contemporary major selectors (the Dickinson System, Dunkel System, and Houlgate System). Houlgate would later name USC (10–2) on the basis of post-season play. Eight of nine retrospective selectors later also named Notre Dame and USC as No. 1 teams.

Following the season, Pittsburgh traveled to Pasadena to meet USC in the Rose Bowl, at that time the only postseason college football game, where the Trojans defeated the Panthers, 47–14. Four years later, football historian Parke Davis selected Pittsburgh as the "National Champion Foot Ball Team" for 1929, the only one of 12 major selectors to do so. Pittsburgh claims a 1929 national championship on this basis.

A major change in the rules for 1929 was that a fumbled ball was dead as soon as it struck the ground. Previously, a defending player could run with a recovered fumble, as in the case of Roy Riegels in the 1929 Rose Bowl.

== Conference and program changes ==
=== Conferences ===
- Three new conferences began play in 1929:
  - Arkansas Intercollegiate Conference – an NAIA conference active through the 1995 season
  - Big Four Conference – active through the 1932 season; replaced the newly-defunct Oklahoma Intercollegiate Conference
  - Oklahoma Collegiate Athletic Conference – an NAIA conference active through the 1973 season; replaced the newly-defunct Oklahoma Intercollegiate Conference

=== Programs ===
The Duke Blue Devils were independent in 1928 and joined the Southern Conference in 1929.

== September ==
September 21 In Dallas, Southern Methodist University (SMU) opened its season with a 13–3 win over North Texas State.

September 28 SMU and Howard Payne College played to a 13–13 tie, and TCU rolled over visiting Daniel Baker College, 61–0. In Los Angeles, USC opened its season against crosstown rival UCLA, rolling over the Bruins 76–0. Pittsburgh beat Waynesburg State, 53–0 California beat Santa Clara 27–6 Pennsylvania beat Franklin & Marshall 14–7 Tulane opened with a win over Northwestern State, 40–6

== October ==
October 5

SMU and Nebraska played to a 0–0 tie in Nebraska. Notre Dame opened its season with a 14–0 win at Indiana TCU beat Hardin Simmons, 20–0 Illinois beat Kansas 25–0, and Purdue beat Kansas State, 26–14 Pittsburgh won at Duke, 52–7 USC beat Oregon State 21–7 Pennsylvania defeated Swarthmore 20–6 California and St. Mary's played to a 0–0 tie. Tulane beat Texas A&M, 13–10

October 12

In Baltimore, Notre Dame defeated Navy, 14–7. SMU beat Austin College, 16–0 In Shreveport, TCU registered another shutout, beating Centenary College 28–0 Nebraska won at Syracuse, 13–6 USC won at Washington, 48–0, and California beat visiting Washington State, 14–0. Purdue beat Michigan 30–16 and Illinois beat Bradley 45–0 Pittsburgh beat West Virginia 27–7 Pennsylvania beat Virginia Tech, 14–8 Tulane beat Mississippi State, 34–0

October 19

Pittsburgh handed Nebraska its first loss, 12–7; TCU surrendered its first points, but beat Texas A&M, 13–7. Illinois and Iowa played to a 7–7 tie. Purdue beat DePauw 26–7 Tulane beat Lafayette College of Louisiana, 60–0 USC scored big again, with a 64–0 win over Occidental. At 4–0–0, the Trojans had outscored their opponents 209–7. In Chicago, Notre Dame defeated Wisconsin 19–0

In Philadelphia, (1–0–1) California and (3–0) Pennsylvania played, with California winning 12–7

October 26 During the weekend between October 24 and October 29, 1929 (see Wall Street Crash of 1929), SMU beat visiting Ole Miss, 52–0 and TCU, with a 131–7 aggregate lead over its opponents, won its fifth straight, a 22–0 win over Texas Tech. In Pittsburgh, the Pitt Panthers beat Allegheny 40–0 and Notre Dame defeated Carnegie Tech 7–0. Illinois beat visiting Michigan 14–0, and Purdue won at Chicago 26–0 The USC offense was held to single digits at Stanford, winning 7–0. California defeated the non-college Olympic Club, 21–19. Pennsylvania beat Lehigh 10–7 and in New Orleans, Tulane beat Georgia Tech, 20–14. Nebraska and Missouri played to a 7–7 tie.

== November ==
November 2 In Los Angeles, USC (5–0–0) hosted California (4–0–1). California handed the Trojans their first loss, 15–7 In Dallas, unbeaten (3–0–2) SMU and unbeaten and untied Texas (5–0–0) both stayed unbeaten, playing to 0–0 tie. Notre Dame beat visiting Georgia Tech 26–6 In Columbus, Georgia, Tulane beat Georgia, 21–15

TCU beat North Texas State, 25–0 Nebraska beat Kansas, 12–6 Purdue won at Wisconsin 13–0, but Illinois lost at Northwestern, 7–0, Pittsburgh beat Ohio State, 18–2 Pennsylvania defeated Navy, 7–2

November 9

SMU won at Texas A&M 12–7 and TCU beat Rice, 24–0 Illinois beat Army, 17–7 and Purdue beat Ole Miss 27–7 Pittsburgh beat Washington & Jefferson 21–0 Notre Dame defeated Drake University Tulane beat Auburn, 52–0 USC beat visiting Nevada, 66–0 and California beat Montana 53–18

At Philadelphia, (5–1–0) Penn State defeated (5–1–0) Pennsylvania, 19–7

November 16

In Chicago, a record crowd of 123,000 turned out at Soldier Field to watch Notre Dame (6–0–0) and USC (6–1–0). Knute Rockne, who had been hospitalized with an infected leg, guided his team from a cot set behind the Notre Dame bench. In the third quarter, the Irish took a 13–6 lead, on—Savoldi's plunge and Frank Carideo's extra point. On the ensuing kickoff, -- Saunders ran the ball back 95 yards for a touchdown, but the point after failed, and Notre Dame held on to win 13–12.

Nebraska and visiting Oklahoma played to a 13–13 draw; at (2–1–3), the Cornhuskers had tied more games than they had won or lost. SMU beat Baylor, 25–6. TCU was (7–0–0) and had outscored its opposition 193–7; Texas (5–0–2) had an aggregate 120–0 lead on its opponents, though its last two games had been scoreless ties. When they met at Austin, Texas scored first, but Cy Leland returned the kickoff 90 yards for a TCU score. At halftime, TCU led 13–12 on the only extra point scored that day, and finished 15–12 Illinois defeated Chicago 20–6 and Purdue beat Iowa 7–0 Pittsburgh beat Carnegie Tech, 34–13 Pennsylvania visited Columbia and won 20–0 California beat Washington 7–0

Tulane defeated Sewanee 18–0

November 23 Nebraska won at Kansas State, 10–6 SMU beat Rice, 34–0 TCU beat Baylor, 34–7 Illinois beat Ohio State, 27–0, and Purdue won at Indiana 32–0 to finish its season unbeaten. Notre Dame won at Northwestern 26–6. USC beat visiting Idaho, 72–0 Stanford (7–2–0) and California met in Palo Alto, with Stanford winning 21–6.

November 28, Thanksgiving Day; Pittsburgh beat Penn State 20–7 Pennsylvania beat Cornell 17–7 Nebraska closed its season with a 31–12 win over Iowa State, to finish at 4–1–3.

November 30 In a season-ending matchup of the Southwest Conference's two best teams at Fort Worth, Texas Christian (9–0–0) hosted Southern Methodist (6–0–3). Although SMU took a 7–0 lead in the third quarter, and held the Frogs once at the goal line, TCU reached the one on its next possession, and scored on third down. Hawks Green's kick staved off an upset, tied the Mustangs 7–7, and gave TCU the conference title.

Notre Dame (8–0–0) closed its season at Yankee Stadium in New York, where it faced Army (6–2–1). The Fighting Irish won 7–0. USC beat Washington State, 27–7 Tulane closed its season with a 21–0 win at LSU, to finish unbeaten at 9–0–0

On December 14, USC defeated Carnegie Tech, 45–13.

== 1930 Rose Bowl ==
USC had been beaten earlier in the year, at Chicago, by Notre Dame. The Trojans and the Fighting Irish were not able to agree on a rematch, and USC was given the right to invite another eastern powerhouse—the unbeaten (9–0–0) Pittsburgh Panthers. Pitt's bid for a claim to the national championship started on the first play of the game, as Toby Uansa ran 68 yards before being tackled at the 11, but the Panthers failed to reach the end zone. Six minutes into the game, Russ Saunders and --- Edelson connected on a 56-yard pass play for USC's first touchdown. By halftime, USC led 26–0. Pitt finally scored in the third quarter to trail 33–7. After seven USC touchdowns, the final score was USC 47, Pitt 14.

== Conference standings ==
=== Major conference standings ===
1929 Big Six Conference football standings
	Conf.					Overall
Team	W		L		T	W		L		T
No. 7 Nebraska $	3	–	0	–	2	4	–	1	–	3
Missouri	3	–	1	–	1	5	–	2	–	1
Kansas State	3	–	2	–	0	3	–	5	–	0
Oklahoma	2	–	2	–	1	3	–	3	–	2
Kansas	2	–	3	–	0	4	–	4	–	0
Iowa State	0	–	5	–	0	1	–	7	–	0
$ – Conference champion; Rankings from Dickinson System

1929 Rocky Mountain Conference football standings
	Conf.					Overall
Team	W		L		T	W		L		T
Utah $	6	–	0	–	0	7	–	0	–	0
Colorado	4	–	1	–	1	5	–	1	–	1
Denver	4	–	1	–	1	5	–	1	–	1
Montana State	2	–	1	–	0	6	–	2	–	0
BYU	4	–	2	–	0	5	–	3	–	0
Colorado Teachers	3	–	2	–	0	4	–	3	–	0
Colorado College	4	–	3	–	0	4	–	3	–	0
Colorado Agricultural	4	–	4	–	0	5	–	4	–	0
Utah State	3	–	4	–	0	3	–	4	–	0
Colorado Mines	1	–	5	–	0	2	–	5	–	0
Western State (CO)	0	–	5	–	0	2	–	5	–	0
Wyoming	0	–	7	–	0	1	–	7	–	0
$ – Conference champion

1929 Big Ten Conference football standings
	Conf.					Overall
Team	W		L		T	W		L		T
No. 2 Purdue $	5	–	0	–	0	8	–	0	–	0
No. 5 Illinois	3	–	1	–	1	6	–	1	–	1
Minnesota	3	–	2	–	0	6	–	2	–	0
Northwestern	3	–	2	–	0	6	–	3	–	0
Iowa	2	–	2	–	2	4	–	2	–	2
Ohio State	2	–	2	–	1	4	–	3	–	1
Michigan	1	–	3	–	1	5	–	3	–	1
Indiana	1	–	3	–	1	2	–	6	–	1
Chicago	1	–	3	–	0	7	–	3	–	0
Wisconsin	1	–	4	–	0	4	–	5	–	0
$ – Conference champion; Rankings from Dickinson System

1929 Southern Conference football standings
	Conf.					Overall
Team	W		L		T	W		L		T
No. 10 Tulane $	6	–	0	–	0	9	–	0	–	0
Tennessee	6	–	0	–	1	9	–	0	–	1
North Carolina	7	–	1	–	0	9	–	1	–	0
Florida	6	–	1	–	0	8	–	2	–	0
Vanderbilt	5	–	1	–	0	7	–	2	–	0
Kentucky	3	–	1	–	1	6	–	1	–	1
Georgia	4	–	2	–	0	6	–	4	–	0
VMI	4	–	2	–	0	8	–	2	–	0
Duke	2	–	1	–	0	4	–	6	–	0
LSU	3	–	2	–	0	6	–	3	–	0
Alabama	4	–	3	–	0	6	–	3	–	0
Clemson	3	–	3	–	0	8	–	3	–	0
VPI	2	–	3	–	0	5	–	4	–	0
Georgia Tech	3	–	5	–	0	3	–	6	–	0
South Carolina	2	–	5	–	0	6	–	5	–	0
Virginia	1	–	3	–	2	4	–	3	–	2
Maryland	1	–	3	–	1	4	–	4	–	2
Washington and Lee	1	–	4	–	1	3	–	5	–	1
Ole Miss	0	–	4	–	2	1	–	6	–	2
Mississippi A&M	0	–	3	–	1	1	–	5	–	2
Sewanee	0	–	4	–	1	2	–	5	–	2
NC State	0	–	5	–	0	1	–	8	–	0
Auburn	0	–	7	–	0	2	–	7	–	0
$ – Conference champion; Rankings from Dickinson System

1929 Pacific Coast Conference football standings
	Conf.					Overall
Team	W		L		T	W		L		T
No. 6 USC ^ +	6	–	1	–	0	10	–	2	–	0
Stanford +	5	–	1	–	0	9	–	2	–	0
No. 4 California +	4	–	1	–	0	7	–	1	–	1
Oregon +	4	–	1	–	0	7	–	3	–	0
Washington State	4	–	2	–	0	10	–	2	–	0
UCLA	1	–	3	–	0	4	–	4	–	0
Oregon State	1	–	4	–	0	5	–	4	–	0
Idaho	1	–	4	–	0	4	–	5	–	0
Montana	0	–	4	–	1	3	–	5	–	1
Washington	0	–	5	–	1	2	–	6	–	1
+ – Conference co-champions; ^ – Selected as Rose Bowl representative; Rankings from Dickinson System

1929 Southwest Conference football standings
	Conf.					Overall
Team	W		L		T	W		L		T
No. 8 TCU $	4	–	0	–	1	9	–	0	–	1
No. 9 SMU	3	–	0	–	2	6	–	0	–	4
Arkansas	3	–	2	–	0	7	–	2	–	0
Texas	2	–	2	–	2	5	–	2	–	2
Baylor	2	–	2	–	1	7	–	3	–	1
Texas A&M	2	–	3	–	0	5	–	3	–	0
Rice	0	–	5	–	0	2	–	7	–	0
$ – Conference champion; Rankings from Dickinson System

=== Independents ===
1929 Eastern college football independents records
	Conf.			Overall
Team	W	L	T	W		L		T
No. 3 Pittsburgh		–		9	–	1	–	0
Colgate		–		8	–	1	–	0
Fordham		–		7	–	0	–	2
Bucknell		–		8	–	2	–	0
No. 11 Penn		–		7	–	2	–	0
Boston College		–		7	–	2	–	1
Villanova		–		7	–	2	–	1
Cornell		–		6	–	2	–	0
Tufts		–		5	–	1	–	2
Harvard		–		5	–	2	–	1
Yale		–		5	–	2	–	1
NYU		–		7	–	3	–	0
Franklin & Marshall		–		6	–	3	–	0
Penn State		–		6	–	3	–	0
Syracuse		–		6	–	3	–	0
Washington & Jefferson		–		5	–	2	–	2
Drexel		–		6	–	3	–	1
Temple		–		6	–	3	–	1
Carnegie Tech		–		5	–	3	–	1
Army		–		6	–	4	–	1
Providence		–		3	–	3	–	2
Brown		–		5	–	5	–	0
Columbia		–		4	–	5	–	0
CCNY		–		2	–	4	–	2
Princeton		–		2	–	4	–	1
Boston University		–		3	–	6	–	0
Vermont		–		2	–	7	–	0
Rankings from Dickinson System

1929 Midwestern college football independents records
	Conf.			Overall
Team	W	L	T	W		L		T
No. 1 Notre Dame		–		9	–	0	–	0
Detroit		–		7	–	1	–	1
Haskell		–		8	–	2	–	0
Loyola (IL)		–		5	–	2	–	1
Michigan State		–		5	–	3	–	0
John Carroll		–		5	–	3	–	1
Marquette		–		4	–	3	–	1
Butler		–		4	–	4	–	0
Michigan Tech		–		2	–	2	–	1
Wabash		–		4	–	5	–	0
Saint Louis		–		3	–	4	–	1
DePaul		–		2	–	7	–	0
Kent State		–		1	–	7	–	0
Valparaiso		–		1	–	7	–	0
Ball State		–		0	–	7	–	0
Rankings from Dickinson System

1929 Southern college football independents records
	Conf.			Overall
Team	W	L	T	W		L		T
Western Maryland		–		11	–	0	–	0
Delaware State		–		1	–	0	–	0
Guilford		–		7	–	1	–	1
Texas Mines		–		6	–	1	–	2
Appalachian State		–		4	–	1	–	3
Navy		–		6	–	2	–	2
Georgetown		–		5	–	2	–	2
South Georgia Teachers		–		5	–	2	–	2
Middle Tennessee State Teachers		–		6	–	3	–	1
Beacom College		–		3	–	2	–	0
Wake Forest		–		6	–	5	–	1
Catholic University		–		5	–	4	–	0
West Virginia		–		4	–	3	–	3
Loyola (LA)		–		4	–	4	–	2
Davidson		–		5	–	5	–	0
Texas A&I		–		3	–	4	–	1
East Tennessee State Teachers		–		2	–	5	–	1
Mississippi State Teachers		–		2	–	6	–	1
Texas Tech		–		1	–	7	–	2
Delaware		–		0	–	7	–	1
George Washington		–		0	–	8	–	0

1929 Western college football independents records
	Conf.			Overall
Team	W	L	T	W		L		T
Saint Mary's		–		8	–	0	–	1
Arizona		–		7	–	1	–	0
Loyola (CA)		–		6	–	3	–	0
Santa Clara		–		5	–	3	–	0
Gonzaga		–		4	–	3	–	0
Hawaii		–		4	–	3	–	0
New Mexico A&M		–		3	–	2	–	3
St. Ignatius (CA)		–		4	–	3	–	1
Santa Barbara State		–		4	–	4	–	1
New Mexico		–		2	–	4	–	2
Regis		–		3	–	7	–	0
Humboldt State		–		1	–	4	–	1
Arizona State		–		0	–	6	–	0
Columbia (OR)		–				–

=== Minor conferences ===
Conference	Champion(s)	Record
Big Four Conference	Tulsa	4–0–1
Central Intercollegiate Athletics Association	Virginia State College	6–0
Central Intercollegiate Athletic Conference	Kansas State Teachers	5–1
Far Western Conference	Northern Branch	2–0
Iowa Intercollegiate Athletic Conference	Iowa Wesleyan	5–0
Kansas Collegiate Athletic Conference	Kansas Wesleyan	4–0–1
Michigan Intercollegiate Athletic Association	Alma	5–0
Midwest Collegiate Athletic Conference	Coe	4–0
Minnesota Intercollegiate Athletic Conference	Saint Thomas (MN)	3–1
Missouri Intercollegiate Athletic Association	Northeast Missouri State Teachers	3–0
Nebraska College Athletic Conference	Cotner	5–0
Nebraska Intercollegiate Athletic Association	Nebraska State Teachers–Peru	—
North Central Intercollegiate Conference	North Dakota	4–0
Ohio Athletic Conference	Muskingum	5–0
Oklahoma Collegiate Athletic Conference	Central State Teachers (OK)	5–0
Pacific Northwest Conference	Willamette	4–0
South Dakota Intercollegiate Conference	Black Hills Teachers; Dakota Wesleyan	5–0; 4–0–1
Southern California Intercollegiate Athletic Conference	Occidental	4–0
Southern Intercollegiate Athletic Conference	Tuskegee	5–0
Southwestern Athletic Conference	Wiley (TX)	3–0–1
Texas Collegiate Athletic Conference	Howard Payne	5–0
Texas Intercollegiate Athletic Association	Southwest Texas State Normal	4–2
Tri-Normal League	State Normal–Ellensburg	2–0
Wisconsin State Teachers College Conference	Milwaukee State Teachers	3–0–1

=== Minor conference standings ===
1929 Big Four Conference (Oklahoma) football standings
	Conf.					Overall
Team	W		L		T	W		L		T
Tulsa $	4	–	0	–	1	6	–	3	–	1
Oklahoma Baptist	2	–	3	–	0	5	–	3	–	0
Oklahoma City	2	–	3	–	0	5	–	5	–	0
Phillips	1	–	3	–	1	4	–	4	–	3
$ – Conference champion

1929 Buckeye Athletic Association football standings
	Conf.					Overall
Team	W		L		T	W		L		T
Ohio $	5	–	0	–	0	9	–	0	–	0
Ohio Wesleyan	3	–	1	–	1	6	–	2	–	1
Miami (OH)	3	–	2	–	0	7	–	2	–	0
Wittenberg	2	–	2	–	1	5	–	4	–	1
Cincinnati	0	–	4	–	1	4	–	4	–	1
Denison	0	–	4	–	1	1	–	6	–	1
$ – Conference champion

1929 Central Intercollegiate Conference football standings
	Conf.					Overall
Team	W		L		T	W		L		T
Emporia Teachers $	5	–	1	–	0	6	–	2	–	0
Washburn	4	–	2	–	0	5	–	6	–	0
College of Emporia	2	–	2	–	2	3	–	3	–	2
Wichita	2	–	2	–	2	3	–	3	–	2
Southwestern (KS)	2	–	4	–	0	2	–	5	–	1
Hays Teachers	2	–	4	–	0	2	–	5	–	0
Pittsburg State	1	–	3	–	2	1	–	5	–	2
$ – Conference champion

1929 Colored Intercollegiate Athletic Association football standings
	Conf.					Overall
Team	W		L		T	W		L		T
Virginia State $	7	–	0	–	0	8	–	1	–	0
Virginia Union	5	–	1	–	0	7	–	1	–	0
Lincoln (PA)	4	–	2	–	1	6	–	2	–	1
Hampton	3	–	4	–	0	3	–	5	–	0
Saint Paul's (VA)	3	–	4	–	0	6	–	4	–	0
North Carolina A&T	2	–	4	–	0	2	–	6	–	0
Shaw	1	–	3	–	0	4	–	4	–	0
Howard	0	–	1	–	1	0	–	7	–	2
North Carolina College	0	–	6	–	0	0	–	7	–	0
$ – Conference champion

1929 Eastern Pennsylvania Collegiate Conference football standings
	Conf.					Overall
Team	W		L		T	W		L		T
Gettysburg $	3	–	0	–	0	6	–	2	–	1
Franklin & Marshall	3	–	1	–	0	6	–	3	–	0
Ursinus	1	–	1	–	1	2	–	4	–	3
Muhlenberg	1	–	3	–	0	3	–	6	–	0
Dickinson	0	–	3	–	1	2	–	7	–	1
$ – Conference champion

1929 Far Western Conference football standings
	Conf.					Overall
Team	W		L		T	W		L		T
Cal Aggies $	5	–	0	–	0	6	–	2	–	0
Nevada	2	–	1	–	0	2	–	5	–	1
San Jose State	2	–	1	–	1	3	–	3	–	1
Pacific (CA)	1	–	3	–	1	3	–	4	–	1
Chico State	1	–	3	–	0	3	–	5	–	0
Fresno State	1	–	4	–	0	1	–	7	–	0
$ – Conference champion

1929 Illinois Intercollegiate Athletic Conference football standings
	Conf.					Overall
Team	W		L		T	W		L		T
Knox (IL) +	5	–	0	–	0	7	–	1	–	0
Lombard +	3	–	0	–	0	6	–	1	–	1
Millikin	5	–	1	–	0	7	–	1	–	0
Eastern Illinois	5	–	1	–	0	6	–	1	–	0
Monmouth (IL)	5	–	1	–	0	5	–	4	–	0
Northern Illinois State	4	–	1	–	1	6	–	1	–	1
Illinois Wesleyan	5	–	2	–	0	5	–	3	–	0
Elmhurst	2	–	1	–	0	8	–	1	–	0
Bradley	4	–	2	–	0	6	–	3	–	0
Southern Illinois	4	–	2	–	0	5	–	3	–	1
Shurtleff	3	–	2	–	0	5	–	3	–	0
Carthage	2	–	2	–	1	4	–	3	–	1
Eureka	3	–	3	–	2	3	–	3	–	2
Illinois College	3	–	3	–	0	4	–	4	–	0
Augustana (IL)	3	–	3	–	1	3	–	4	–	1
North Central *	2	–	4	–	1	3	–	5	–	1
Lake Forest	1	–	2	–	0	2	–	5	–	0
McKendree	1	–	4	–	0	4	–	6	–	0
Wheaton (IL)	1	–	4	–	1	2	–	6	–	1
Illinois State Normal	1	–	5	–	2	1	–	5	–	2
St. Viator	0	–	6	–	1	0	–	7	–	1
Mount Morris	0	–	6	–	0	2	–	6	–	0
Western Illinois †	0	–	7	–	0	0	–	8	–	0
+ – Conference co-champions; * – North Central finished the season 6–0–1 in conference play, but forfeited their share of the title and four wins, over Lake Forest, Augustana, Carthage, and Monmouth, because of an ineligible player. † – Western Illinois finished the season 3–4 in conference play, but forfeited three wins, over Shurtleff, Augustana, and Illinois State, because of an ineligible player.

1929 Indiana Intercollegiate Conference football standings
	Conf.					Overall
Team	W		L		T	W		L		T
Butler $	2	–	0	–	0	4	–	4	–	0
Indiana State	5	–	0	–	1	5	–	2	–	1
Central Normal	6	–	1	–	0	6	–	2	–	0
Franklin (IN)	5	–	2	–	1	5	–	2	–	1
Manchester	3	–	2	–	0	5	–	2	–	0
Earlham	3	–	2	–	1	3	–	4	–	1
Rose Poly	4	–	4	–	0	4	–	4	–	0
Indiana Central	4	–	4	–	0	4	–	4	–	0
DePauw	3	–	3	–	0	4	–	4	–	0
Wabash	2	–	2	–	0	4	–	5	–	0
Hanover	1	–	1	–	1	2	–	3	–	1
Evansville	1	–	5	–	0	1	–	7	–	0
Valparaiso	0	–	3	–	0	1	–	7	–	0
Ball State	0	–	4	–	0	0	–	8	–	0
Oakland City	0	–	6	–	0	0	–	7	–	0
$ – Conference champion

1929 Iowa Conference football standings
	Conf.					Overall
Team	W		L		T	W		L		T
Iowa Wesleyan $	5	–	0	–	0	8	–	0	–	0
Buena Vista	3	–	1	–	1	6	–	1	–	2
Columbia (IA)	3	–	1	–	1	4	–	1	–	1
Luther	6	–	2	–	0	6	–	3	–	0
Iowa State Teachers	3	–	1	–	0	3	–	4	–	0
Simpson (IA)	4	–	2	–	0	6	–	3	–	0
Morningside	1	–	1	–	0	4	–	4	–	0
Central (IA)	2	–	4	–	0	3	–	4	–	1
St. Ambrose	1	–	3	–	0	3	–	4	–	1
Upper Iowa	1	–	3	–	1	1	–	5	–	1
Parsons	1	–	4	–	1	1	–	6	–	1
Penn (IA)	1	–	5	–	0	1	–	6	–	0
Dubuque	0	–	2	–	0	2	–	3	–	1
Western Union	0	–	2	–	0	1	–	7	–	1
$ – Conference champion; Upper Iowa's forfeit to Simpson on November 22 was not counted in conference standings.

1929 Metropolitan Collegiate Conference football standings
	Conf.					Overall
Team	W		L		T	W		L		T
Long Island $	4	–	0	–	0	5	–	5	–	0
Brooklyn City College	3	–	1	–	0	3	–	4	–	1
New York Aggies	2	–	2	–	0	3	–	2	–	1
Cooper Union	1	–	3	–	0	1	–	7	–	0
Wagner College	0	–	4	–	0	1	–	7	–	0
$ – Conference champion

1929 Michigan Collegiate Conference football standings
	Conf.					Overall
Team	W		L		T	W		L		T
Michigan State Normal +	2	–	0	–	1	5	–	1	–	2
Western State Teachers +	2	–	0	–	1	5	–	2	–	1
Detroit City College	1	–	2	–	0	2	–	7	–	0
Central State (MI)	0	–	3	–	0	2	–	3	–	2
+ – Conference co-champions

1929 Michigan Intercollegiate Athletic Association football standings
	Conf.					Overall
Team	W		L		T	W		L		T
Alma $	5	–	0	–	0	6	–	1	–	0
Albion	4	–	1	–	0	5	–	3	–	0
Hillsdale	2	–	2	–	1	5	–	2	–	1
Olivet	1	–	3	–	1	3	–	4	–	1
Hope	1	–	4	–	0	1	–	5	–	0
Kalamazoo	0	–	3	–	2	1	–	4	–	3
$ – Conference champion

1929 Kansas Collegiate Athletic Conference football standings
	Conf.					Overall
Team	W		L		T	W		L		T
Kansas Wesleyan $	4	–	0	–	1	6	–	0	–	2
Bethany (KS)	4	–	1	–	0	5	–	3	–	1
Baker	2	–	2	–	1	5	–	3	–	1
McPherson	2	–	3	–	0	4	–	4	–	0
St. Mary's (KS)	1	–	2	–	2	2	–	5	–	2
Ottawa	0	–	5	–	0	2	–	6	–	0

1929 Middle Three Conference football standings
	Conf.					Overall
Team	W		L		T	W		L		T
Lehigh +	1	–	1	–	0	4	–	3	–	2
Rutgers +	1	–	1	–	0	5	–	4	–	0
Lafayette +	1	–	1	–	0	3	–	5	–	0
$ – Conference champion

1929 Midwest Conference football standings
	Conf.					Overall
Team	W		L		T	W		L		T
Coe $	4	–	0	–	0	5	–	3	–	0
Lawrence	2	–	0	–	1	4	–	2	–	1
Ripon	2	–	0	–	1	3	–	3	–	1
Knox	2	–	1	–	0	7	–	1	–	0
Carleton	2	–	2	–	0	3	–	4	–	0
Cornell (IA)	2	–	3	–	0	2	–	6	–	0
Monmouth (IL)	0	–	2	–	0	5	–	4	–	0
Hamline	0	–	2	–	0	2	–	6	–	0
Beloit	0	–	4	–	0	2	–	6	–	0
$ – Conference champion

1929 Minnesota Intercollegiate Athletic Conference football standings
	Conf.					Overall
Team	W		L		T	W		L		T
Saint Mary's (MN) $	3	–	0	–	1	6	–	1	–	1
St. Olaf	4	–	1	–	0	7	–	1	–	0
St. Thomas (MN)	4	–	2	–	0	7	–	2	–	0
Gustavus Adolphus	3	–	2	–	0	6	–	2	–	0
Augsburg	3	–	2	–	1	4	–	2	–	1
Concordia (MN)	1	–	2	–	1	2	–	3	–	1
Hamline	2	–	4	–	0	2	–	6	–	0
Macalester	1	–	4	–	1	1	–	4	–	1
Saint John's (MN)	0	–	4	–	0	0	–	6	–	0
$ – Conference champion

1929 Mississippi Valley Conference football standings
	Conf.					Overall
Team	W		L		T	W		L		T
West Tennessee State Teachers $	5	–	0	–	1	8	–	0	–	2
Murray State	3	–	1	–	0	5	–	4	–	0
Delta State	2	–	1	–	2	5	–	1	–	2
Lambuth	3	–	2	–	1	4	–	5	–	0
Caruthersville Junior	2	–	2	–	1	2	–	2	–	1
Tennessee Junior	3	–	4	–	0	4	–	4	–	0
Bethel (TN)	2	–	3	–	0	2	–	5	–	0
Will Mayfield	1	–	2	–	0	3	–	4	–	0
Sunflower Junior	0	–	1	–	1	0	–	1	–	1
Jonesboro College	0	–	5	–	0	0	–	6	–	0
$ – Conference champion

1929 Missouri College Athletic Union football standings
	Conf.					Overall
Team	W		L		T	W		L		T
Missouri Valley $	4	–	0	–	0	7	–	0	–	1
Westminster (MO)	5	–	1	–	1	6	–	2	–	1
Central (MO)	4	–	2	–	0	5	–	3	–	0
Tarkio	2	–	1	–	0	3	–	5	–	0
Missouri Mines	1	–	2	–	0	5	–	3	–	0
William Jewell	1	–	2	–	1	4	–	3	–	1
Drury	1	–	3	–	0	3	–	5	–	0
Central Wesleyan	0	–	3	–	1	2	–	4	–	2
Culver–Stockton	0	–	4	–	1	0	–	7	–	1
$ – Conference champion

1929 Missouri Intercollegiate Athletic Association football standings
	Conf.					Overall
Team	W		L		T	W		L		T
Kirksville $	2	–	0	–	1	5	–	3	–	1
Springfield (MO)	2	–	1	–	1	6	–	2	–	1
Maryville (MO)	1	–	1	–	1	3	–	2	–	3
Cape Girardeau	1	–	1	–	0	3	–	3	–	1
Warrensburg	0	–	3	–	1	0	–	8	–	1
$ – Conference champion

1929 Missouri Valley Conference football standings
	Conf.					Overall
Team	W		L		T	W		L		T
Drake $	3	–	0	–	1	5	–	3	–	1
Grinnell	1	–	0	–	2	5	–	1	–	2
Oklahoma A&M	1	–	1	–	0	4	–	3	–	2
Washington University	0	–	1	–	1	3	–	4	–	1
Creighton	0	–	3	–	0	2	–	6	–	0
$ – Conference champion

1929 Nebraska College Athletic Conference football standings
	Conf.					Overall
Team	W		L		T	W		L		T
Cotner $	5	–	0	–	0	6	–	1	–	0
Doane	5	–	1	–	0	6	–	1	–	0
Hastings	3	–	2	–	0	5	–	4	–	0
Midland	3	–	2	–	0	4	–	4	–	2
Nebraska Wesleyan	2	–	3	–	0	3	–	5	–	1
Nebraska Central	1	–	3	–	1	?	–	?	–	?
York (NE)	1	–	4	–	0	2	–	5	–	0
Grand Island	0	–	5	–	1	0	–	6	–	2
$ – Conference champion

1929 Nebraska Intercollegiate Athletic Association football standings
	Conf.					Overall
Team	W		L		T	W		L		T
Chadron State +	3	–	1	–	0	8	–	1	–	0
Peru State +	3	–	1	–	0	6	–	1	–	2
Omaha	2	–	2	–	1	4	–	2	–	3
Wayne State	1	–	1	–	2	2	–	4	–	3
Kearney State	0	–	3	–	1	2	–	7	–	1
Dana	0	–	1	–	0	1	–	5	–	1
+ – Conference co-champions

1929 New England Conference football standings
	Conf.					Overall
Team	W		L		T	W		L		T
New Hampshire $	2	–	0	–	0	7	–	2	–	0
Rhode Island State	1	–	1	–	0	5	–	2	–	1
Connecticut	1	–	2	–	0	4	–	4	–	0
Maine	1	–	2	–	0	2	–	5	–	0
Massachusetts	0	–	0	–	0	3	–	4	–	1
$ – Conference champion

1929 North Central Conference football standings
	Conf.					Overall
Team	W		L		T	W		L		T
North Dakota $	4	–	0	–	0	9	–	1	–	0
South Dakota State	2	–	1	–	1	5	–	4	–	1
North Dakota Agricultural	1	–	1	–	2	4	–	3	–	2
Morningside	1	–	3	–	0	4	–	4	–	0
South Dakota	0	–	3	–	1	4	–	4	–	1
$ – Conference champion

1929 Northwest Conference football standings
	Conf.					Overall
Team	W		L		T	W		L		T
Willamette $	5	–	0	–	0	6	–	2	–	0
Whitman	4	–	1	–	0	5	–	5	–	0
College of Idaho	3	–	2	–	0	4	–	4	–	0
Pacific (OR)	2	–	3	–	0	4	–	4	–	0
Puget Sound	1	–	4	–	0	3	–	5	–	1
Linfield	0	–	5	–	0	0	–	7	–	0
$ – Conference champion

1929 Northwest Ohio League football standings
	Conf.					Overall
Team	W		L		T	W		L		T
Bowling Green +	3	–	0	–	1	4	–	2	–	1
Toledo +	3	–	0	–	1	4	–	2	–	1
Defiance	2	–	2	–	0	3	–	4	–	1
Findlay	1	–	3	–	0	3	–	5	–	0
Bluffton	0	–	4	–	0	0	–	6	–	1
+ – Conference co-champions

1929 Ohio Athletic Conference football standings
	Conf.					Overall
Team	W		L		T	W		L		T
Muskingum $	5	–	0	–	0	6	–	2	–	0
Heidelberg	2	–	0	–	0	4	–	3	–	0
Dayton	1	–	0	–	0	4	–	5	–	0
Akron	7	–	1	–	0	9	–	1	–	0
Baldwin–Wallace	4	–	1	–	1	6	–	1	–	1
Wooster	5	–	2	–	1	5	–	2	–	1
Mount Union	4	–	2	–	1	5	–	3	–	1
Oberlin	3	–	2	–	0	4	–	4	–	0
Western Reserve	3	–	2	–	0	3	–	6	–	0
Marietta	2	–	2	–	0	3	–	5	–	0
Kenyon	2	–	3	–	0	3	–	6	–	0
Otterbein	3	–	5	–	0	3	–	5	–	0
Case	1	–	6	–	0	2	–	7	–	0
Hiram	1	–	6	–	0	1	–	7	–	0
Ohio Northern	0	–	4	–	1	2	–	6	–	1
St. Xavier	0	–	2	–	0	6	–	4	–	0
Capital	0	–	5	–	0	0	–	5	–	2
$ – Conference champion

1929 Oklahoma Collegiate Conference football standings
	Conf.					Overall
Team	W		L		T	W		L		T
Central State Teachers $	5	–	0	–	0	6	–	1	–	2
East Central	4	–	1	–	0	5	–	3	–	0
NW Oklahoma State	3	–	2	–	0	6	–	3	–	0
SE Oklahoma State	2	–	3	–	0	6	–	4	–	0
SW Oklahoma State	1	–	4	–	0	2	–	8	–	1
Northeastern State	0	–	5	–	0	2	–	6	–	0
$ – Conference champion

1929 Smoky Mountain Conference football standings
	Conf.					Overall
Team	W		L		T	W		L		T
Emory and Henry $	3	–	0	–	0	7	–	2	–	1
Milligan	3	–	1	–	1	6	–	1	–	1
Maryville (TN)	2	–	1	–	1	5	–	3	–	1
King	2	–	3	–	0	5	–	4	–	0
Tusculum	0	–	2	–	1	2	–	3	–	3
Carson–Newman	0	–	3	–	1	1	–	6	–	2
$ – Conference champion

1929 South Dakota Intercollegiate Conference football standings
	Conf.					Overall
Team	W		L		T	W		L		T
Spearfish +	4	–	0	–	0	5	–	2	–	0
Dakota Wesleyan +	4	–	0	–	1	5	–	2	–	1
Yankton	3	–	1	–	1	5	–	2	–	1
Augustana (SD)	3	–	1	–	0	4	–	4	–	0
South Dakota Mines	3	–	2	–	0	3	–	4	–	0
Northern Normal	2	–	2	–	1	4	–	3	–	1
Sioux Falls	2	–	2	–	1	2	–	3	–	2
Eastern Normal	1	–	6	–	0	2	–	6	–	0
Huron	0	–	4	–	0	0	–	8	–	1
Southern Normal	0	–	4	–	2	0	–	6	–	2
+ – Conference co-champions; Spearfish and South Dakota Mines played twice. The second game was not counted in the conference standings.

1929 Southern California Conference football standings
	Conf.					Overall
Team	W		L		T	W		L		T
Occidental $	4	–	0	–	0	6	–	2	–	0
Pomona	5	–	1	–	0	6	–	2	–	0
Whittier	3	–	2	–	1	4	–	4	–	1
Redlands	2	–	2	–	1	3	–	4	–	1
Caltech	3	–	3	–	0	3	–	6	–	0
San Diego State	1	–	5	–	0	3	–	5	–	0
La Verne	0	–	5	–	0	0	–	5	–	0
$ – Conference champion

1929 Southern Intercollegiate Athletic Association football standings
	Conf.					Overall
Team	W		L		T	W		L		T
Chattanooga $	7	–	0	–	0	8	–	2	–	0
Spring Hill	4	–	0	–	0	7	–	1	–	0
Centre	4	–	0	–	1	5	–	3	–	1
The Citadel	4	–	0	–	1	5	–	4	–	1
Louisiana College	3	–	0	–	1	6	–	2	–	1
Centenary	1	–	0	–	0	6	–	3	–	1
Louisiana Normal	1	–	0	–	2	4	–	3	–	2
Furman	4	–	1	–	1	5	–	4	–	1
Stetson	3	–	1	–	0	5	–	1	–	0
Millsaps	3	–	1	–	2	6	–	1	–	3
Southwestern (TN)	2	–	1	–	0	5	–	3	–	0
Transylvania	2	–	1	–	2	6	–	4	–	3
Miami (FL)	3	–	2	–	0	3	–	2	–	0
Erskine	3	–	2	–	0	6	–	3	–	0
Birmingham–Southern	4	–	3	–	0	4	–	4	–	0
Western Kentucky State Normal	3	–	3	–	0	7	–	3	–	0
Howard (AL)	3	–	3	–	2	5	–	4	–	2
Presbyterian	3	–	3	–	0	4	–	4	–	1
Georgetown (KY)	2	–	3	–	0	4	–	5	–	0
Wofford	2	–	3	–	0	3	–	6	–	0
Oglethorpe	1	–	2	–	0	5	–	4	–	1
Kentucky Wesleyan	1	–	3	–	0	5	–	4	–	0
Louisiana Tech	1	–	3	–	2	3	–	4	–	3
Louisville	1	–	3	–	0	3	–	5	–	0
Southern College	1	–	3	–	0	2	–	5	–	0
Mercer	2	–	5	–	0	2	–	7	–	0
Mississippi College	1	–	4	–	1	3	–	6	–	1
SW Louisiana	1	–	5	–	0	2	–	7	–	0
Union (TN)	0	–	5	–	1	1	–	5	–	1
Newberry	0	–	5	–	0	0	–	7	–	1
Rollins	0	–	5	–	0	0	–	5	–	0
$ – Conference champion

1929 Southwestern Athletic Conference football standings
	Conf.					Overall
Team	W		L		T	W		L		T
Wiley $	3	–	0	–	1	6	–	1	–	1
Bishop	2	–	1	–	1	4	–	3	–	1
Prairie View	1	–	1	–	2	5	–	3	–	1
Samuel Huston	0	–	2	–	2	?	–	?	–	?
Texas College	0	–	2	–	2	?	–	?	–	?
$ – Conference champion

1929 Texas Conference football standings
	Conf.					Overall
Team	W		L		T	W		L		T
Howard Payne $	5	–	0	–	0	8	–	0	–	2
St. Edward's	4	–	1	–	0	5	–	4	–	2
Austin	3	–	2	–	0	3	–	6	–	0
Simmons (TX)	1	–	3	–	1	5	–	4	–	1
Trinity (TX)	1	–	3	–	1	3	–	5	–	1
Southwestern (TX)	0	–	5	–	0	2	–	8	–	0
$ – Conference champion

1929 Texas Intercollegiate Athletic Association football standings
	Conf.					Overall
Team	W		L		T	W		L		T
Southwest Texas State $	4	–	0	–	2	6	–	1	–	2
North Texas State Teachers	2	–	0	–	2	4	–	3	–	2
McMurry	3	–	1	–	1	4	–	1	–	3
Abilene Christian	2	–	1	–	1	6	–	1	–	1
Sam Houston State	2	–	1	–	1	6	–	3	–	1
West Texas State	2	–	2	–	0	6	–	3	–	1
Stephen F. Austin	1	–	3	–	1	1	–	7	–	2
Sul Ross	0	–	1	–	1	1	–	3	–	3
East Texas State	0	–	3	–	1	0	–	6	–	1
Daniel Baker	0	–	4	–	0	3	–	6	–	1
$ – Conference champion

1929 Tri-State Conference football standings
	Conf.					Overall
Team	W		L		T	W		L		T
Duquesne $	3	–	0	–	0	9	–	0	–	1
Thiel	2	–	1	–	0	2	–	5	–	2
Waynesburg	2	–	2	–	0	5	–	4	–	0
Westminster (PA)	2	–	2	–	0	3	–	4	–	0
Geneva	1	–	3	–	0	2	–	6	–	1
Bethany (WV)	0	–	2	–	0	1	–	7	–	0
$ – Conference champion

1929 West Virginia Athletic Conference football standings
	Conf.					Overall
Team	W		L		T	W		L		T
New River State $	5	–	0	–	0	6	–	1	–	1
West Liberty State	4	–	0	–	0	8	–	1	–	0
Glenville State	5	–	1	–	1	6	–	2	–	1
Marshall	4	–	1	–	0	5	–	3	–	1
Potomac State	4	–	1	–	0	6	–	2	–	0
West Virginia Wesleyan	4	–	1	–	0	4	–	6	–	0
Broaddus	6	–	3	–	0	6	–	4	–	0
Salem	2	–	5	–	0	2	–	6	–	0
Bethany (WV)	1	–	3	–	0	1	–	7	–	0
Morehead State	1	–	3	–	0	4	–	4	–	0
Fairmont State	1	–	4	–	0	1	–	7	–	0
Alderson	1	–	5	–	0	2	–	6	–	0
Shepherd	0	–	4	–	0	2	–	6	–	0
Morris Harvey	0	–	8	–	0	0	–	12	–	0
Davis & Elkins *	3	–	0	–	0	10	–	1	–	1
Concord *	0	–	2	–	0	1	–	6	–	0
$ – Conference champion; * – Did not qualify for conference standings Ties did not count in conference standings.

1929 Wisconsin State Teachers College Conference football standings
	Conf.					Overall
Team	W		L		T	W		L		T
Milwaukee State $	3	–	0	–	1	7	–	0	–	1
Superior State	3	–	1	–	0	5	–	3	–	0
Whitewater State	2	–	1	–	1	4	–	2	–	1
Eau Claire State	2	–	1	–	1	3	–	1	–	1
Oshkosh State	3	–	2	–	0	3	–	4	–	0
River Falls State	3	–	2	–	0	4	–	3	–	0
Platteville State	2	–	2	–	0	3	–	3	–	0
La Crosse State	1	–	3	–	0	2	–	5	–	0
Stout Institute	0	–	3	–	1	0	–	5	–	1
Stevens Point State	0	–	4	–	0	0	–	6	–	0
$ – Conference champion; Superior State forfeited to Eau Claire State and Whitewater State forfeited to Platteville State.

== Champions (by method) ==
Various different rankings (using differing methodologies) have identified Notre Dame, Pittsburgh, or the University of Southern California as the season's champion.

- Berryman QPRS: University of Southern California
- Billingsley Report: Notre Dame
- Bonniwell Trophy vote: (Note: awarded upon unanimous consensus of the board of the Veteran Athletes of Philadelphia) Notre Dame
- Boand System: Notre Dame
- College Football Researchers Association: Notre Dame
- Parke H. Davis (Note: for Spalding's Official Foot Ball Guide): Pittsburgh
- Dickinson System: Notre Dame
- Dunkel System: Notre Dame
- Erskine Trophy poll: Notre Dame
- Helms Athletic Foundation: Notre Dame
- Houlgate System: University of Southern California
- National Championship Foundation: Notre Dame
- Poling System: Notre Dame
- Sagarin Ratings Elo chess method: Notre Dame
- Sagarin Ratings Predictor method: University of Southern California

Note: Dickinson System, Dunkel System, Houlgate System, Erskine Trophy poll, and Bonniwell Trophy vote were given contemporarily. All other rankings were given retroactively

== Awards and honors ==
=== All-Americans ===
The consensus All-America team included:

Position	Name	Height	Weight (lbs.)	Class	Hometown	Team
QB	Frank Carideo	5'7"	175	Jr.	Mount Vernon, New York	Notre Dame
HB	Chris Cagle	5'10"	174	Sr.	De Ridder, Louisiana	Army
HB	Gene McEver	5'10"	185	Jr.	Bristol, Virginia	Tennessee
FB	Ralph Welch	6'1"	200	Sr.	Sherman, Texas	Purdue
E	Joe Donchess	6'0"	175	Sr.	Kingston, Pennsylvania	Pittsburgh
T	Bronko Nagurski	6'2"	217	Sr.	International Falls, Minnesota	Minnesota
G	Jack Cannon	5'11"	193	Sr.	Columbus, Ohio	Notre Dame
C	Ben Ticknor	6'2"	193	Jr.	Canton, Massachusetts	Harvard
G	Ray Montgomery	6'1"	188	Sr.	Wheeling, West Virginia	Pittsburgh
T	Elmer Sleight	6'2"	193	Sr.	Sisseton, South Dakota	Purdue
E	Wes Fesler	6'0"	185	Jr.	Youngstown, Ohio	Ohio State

=== Statistical leaders ===
- Player scoring most points: Gene McEver, Tennessee, 130
- Receptions leader: Wear Schoonover, Arkansas, 33
