= 1929 Jacksonville State Eagle Owls football team =

American college football season

1929 Jacksonville State Eagle Owls football
- Conference: Independent
- Record: 5–3
- Head coach: J. W. Stephenson (1st season)
- Home stadium: Daguette Field

1929 Southern college football independents records
	Conf.			Overall
Team	W	L	T	W		L		T
Western Maryland		–		11	–	0	–	0
Delaware State		–		1	–	0	–	0
Guilford		–		7	–	1	–	1
Texas Mines		–		6	–	1	–	2
Appalachian State		–		4	–	1	–	3
Navy		–		6	–	2	–	2
Georgetown		–		5	–	2	–	2
South Georgia Teachers		–		5	–	2	–	2
Middle Tennessee State Teachers		–		6	–	3	–	1
Beacom College		–		3	–	2	–	0
Wake Forest		–		6	–	5	–	1
Catholic University		–		5	–	4	–	0
West Virginia		–		4	–	3	–	3
Loyola (LA)		–		4	–	4	–	2
Davidson		–		5	–	5	–	0
Texas A&I		–		3	–	4	–	1
East Tennessee State Teachers		–		2	–	5	–	1
Mississippi State Teachers		–		2	–	6	–	1
Texas Tech		–		1	–	7	–	2
Delaware		–		0	–	7	–	1
George Washington		–		0	–	8	–	0

The 1929 Jacksonville State Eagle Owls football team represented Jacksonville State Teachers College (now known as Jacksonville State University) as an independent during the 1929 college football season. Led by first-year head coach J. W. Stephenson, the Eagle Owls compiled an overall record of 5–3.

== Schedule ==
Date	Opponent	Site	Result	Source
September 28	at Spring Hill	Mobile, AL	L 0–18	
October 5	Piedmont	Daguette Field; Jacksonville, AL	W 6–0	
October 12	at Middle Tennessee State Teachers	Murfreesboro, TN	L 7–21	
October 26	Middle Georgia	Johnston Field; Anniston, AL	L 6–19	
November 2	at Marion	Rowell Field; Selma, AL	W 20–0	
November 9	Bowdon College	Daguette Field; Jacksonville, AL	W 13–7	
November 16	at Cumberland (TN)	Lebanon, TN	W 7–6	
November 23	at Tennessee Wesleyan	Athens, TN	W 14–13	
