= John D. Naylor =

American athlete and sports coach (1893–1955)

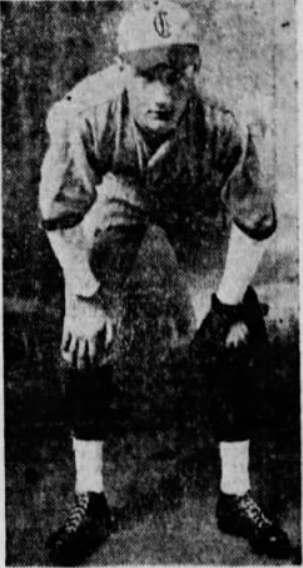
- Naylor with the Milford Caulks, c. 1914

Biographical details
- Born: August 10, 1893; New Castle, Delaware, U.S.
- Died: February 8, 1955 (aged 61); Wilmington, Delaware, U.S.
- Education: Delaware; Pennsylvania; Beacom College

Playing career

Baseball
- c. 1913–1914: Delaware
- c. 1914: Milford Caulks
- 1916: Allentown
- 1917: P. B. & W. R. R. Co.
- 1919: Mechanical
- 1919: P. R. R.
- 1921: Parkside
- c. 1922–1923: Crisfield Crabbers

Basketball
- c. 1913–1914: Delaware
- 1920–1921: Brandywine

Football
- c. 1913–1914: Delaware

Coaching career (HC unless noted)

Baseball
- 1920: St. Mary's
- 1922–1950: Beacom College
- 1951–1952: Goldey–Beacom College

Basketball
- 1920–1921: Brandywine
- 1921–1922: New Castle High School (asst.)
- 1922–1950: Beacom College
- 1951–1952: Goldey–Beacom College

Football
- 1929–1930, 1933–1934: Beacom College

Soccer
- 1925–1950: Beacom College
- 1951–1952: Goldey–Beacom College

Tennis
- c. 1930–?: Beacom College

Administrative career (AD unless noted)
- 1922–1950: Beacom College
- 1951–1952: Goldey–Beacom College

John Derry Naylor (August 10, 1893 – February 8, 1955) was an American athlete and college sports coach. He was best known as an athletics director and multi-sport coach at Beacom College, where he served from 1922 to 1952. Before his coaching career, Naylor was a baseball, basketball, and football player in several minor leagues.

A native of New Castle, Delaware, Naylor was a multi-sport athlete in high school, before attending college at the University of Delaware. Following two years in college, he started a semi-professional baseball career with the Milford Caulks in c. 1914. He also spent time with at least seven other minor league teams between 1916 and 1923. He started a coaching career in 1920 as a player-coach with a Brandywine basketball team and the St. Mary's baseball team. In 1922, he became the athletic director, baseball coach, and basketball coach at Beacom College, where he spent the next 30 years. He retired in 1952.

== Early life and education ==
John D. Naylor was born on August 10, 1893, in New Castle, Delaware, to postmaster Edward H. Naylor. He attended high school at New Castle, playing football, baseball, and basketball. He graduated in 1913, and then went to University of Delaware, where he spent two years.

== Playing career ==
Following his time at Delaware University, Naylor became a baseball player in several low-level minor leagues. His first team was the semi-professional Milford Caulks. After two years with them he signed his first professional contract as a member of the Allentown Atlantic League club. He was recommended to Allentown by Baseball Hall of Famer Bill McGowan. An article in The Evening Journal wrote, "Four days remain until the opening of the new Atlantic League, and judging by the all round work of Johnny Naylor, a New Castle lad, who is working out with the Allentown Club, he is going to hold down a regular berth ... During his stay in Allentown the past five days, Naylor has been playing shortstop. He is an infielder of class, and in all probability will be found on some spot there when the season opens. Playing against the Wilkesbarre team, of the New York State League, last Saturday, he was lead off man ... Naylor played great ball for the Caulk team, of Milford, two years ago."

When the Allentown team folded after one season, Naylor joined the P. B. & W. R. R. Company baseball team. He left after one season to serve in the United States Navy during World War I. Every Evening reported, "Baseball suffered another loss yesterday when John D. Naylor, one of the most popular devotees of the good old game, left for Wissahickon Barracks, Cape May, N. J. Naylor enlisted several weeks ago as a musician in the Naval Coast Reserve and received his call to the colors on Wednesday of last week. He has been prominently known as an all around athlete since 1910 when New Castle High School had the best amateur baseball team in the State."

He returned in 1919 and played for two semi-professional baseball teams that year. Until September, Naylor was a member of the "Mechanical team of the duPont Dye Works League". Afterwards he joined the P. R. R. team in a local circuit. An article by The Morning News described him as, "one of the hardest men in the city to pitch to." In c. 1922–1923, he played for the minor league Crisfield Crabbers.

== Coaching career ==
In 1920, Naylor became a semi-professional baseball manager and basketball player-coach. In baseball, he managed the St. Mary's team of the Catholic Twilight League, leading them to the league championship. In basketball, he was a player-coach for a Brandywine team in the Wilmington Church League. He also refereed several games. In November 1921, Naylor was hired as one of two assistant coaches for the 1921–22 New Castle High School basketball season.

In 1922, while playing minor league baseball for the Crisfield Crabbers, Naylor was named athletic director as well as basketball and baseball coach at Beacom Business College. The school added soccer to their college athletics curriculum in 1925, and, to the surprise of fans, he was given the position of soccer coach as well. By October 1925, Naylor's soccer team was undefeated against other schools, including some considered to be best in the area. John J. Brady of The Morning News wrote, "Everyone who follows athletics in this city is aware of the ability of Johnny Naylor as a ball player, as a court star, and as a successful coach in both of these lines, but few realized that he also was well versed on the dribbling game. To say that he has been successful as coach of the Beacom College eleven, would only be putting it mildly. His team, playing their first season in active competition with other schools, has more than made good. To date they are unbeaten and they have succeeded in turning back some of the leading scholastic elevens in this section."

The Morning News also wrote, "The success of Beacom's is measured in a single word, "teamplay." Every member of the squad has faith in the ability of coach Naylor and they pull for a team victory. Individual play had little room on Beacom teams ... Johnny Naylor and his squad deserve all the praise that is being heaped upon them. They have proven themselves fine sportsmen, both on and off the field, and their record so far this season proves well the calibre of the team."

During his first few seasons at Beacom, Naylor received offers from several other schools as a coach, but declined. He was given a new contract in early August 1927. By that time he had coached 263 sports games in baseball, basketball, and soccer, winning 207 of them. He also had maintained an undefeated soccer record by that point.

In 1929, Beacom organized their first football team, and gave Naylor the task of coaching them. He compiled a 3–2 record during the first season, and a 1–5–1 record during the second. The team was inactive from 1931 to 1932, returning in 1933. He also coached the men's tennis team, which was founded in c. 1930. Around that time he was also named president of the "Central Board of Basketball Officials of Delaware." By the beginning of his thirteenth coaching season, Naylor had won more than 75 percent of all combined basketball, football, soccer, tennis, and baseball games.

He began his twenty-fifth season of Beacom coaching in 1947. Naylor also was a nominee for president of the Eastern Shore League in 1947. He retired from coaching in 1952, due to a heart condition, after more than 30 years.

== Later life and death ==
Afterwards he was an interviewer at the Unemployment Compensation Committee in Wilmington, Delaware. He died there on February 8, 1955, at the age of 61. He reportedly collapsed at his desk and was pronounced dead following his arrival at the Delaware Hospital.
