= 1929 Beacom College football team =

American college football season

1929 Beacom College football
- Conference: Independent
- Record: 3–2
- Head coach: John D. Naylor (1st season)

1929 Southern college football independents records
	Conf.			Overall
Team	W	L	T	W		L		T
Western Maryland		–		11	–	0	–	0
Delaware State		–		1	–	0	–	0
Guilford		–		7	–	1	–	1
Texas Mines		–		6	–	1	–	2
Appalachian State		–		4	–	1	–	3
Navy		–		6	–	2	–	2
Georgetown		–		5	–	2	–	2
South Georgia Teachers		–		5	–	2	–	2
Middle Tennessee State Teachers		–		6	–	3	–	1
Beacom College		–		3	–	2	–	0
Wake Forest		–		6	–	5	–	1
Catholic University		–		5	–	4	–	0
West Virginia		–		4	–	3	–	3
Loyola (LA)		–		4	–	4	–	2
Davidson		–		5	–	5	–	0
Texas A&I		–		3	–	4	–	1
East Tennessee State Teachers		–		2	–	5	–	1
Mississippi State Teachers		–		2	–	6	–	1
Texas Tech		–		1	–	7	–	2
Delaware		–		0	–	7	–	1
George Washington		–		0	–	8	–	0

The 1929 Beacom College football team represented Beacom College (now known as Goldey–Beacom College) in the 1929 college football season as an independent. Led by coach John D. Naylor, Beacom compiled a 3–2 record in the school's first season.

== Schedule ==
Date	Opponent	Site	Result	Source
October 4	at Penns Grove High School	Penns Grove, NJ	L 0–18	
October 11	Delaware JV		L 0–12	
October 18	at Wesley	Dover, DE	W 22–12	
November 2	at West Nottingham Academy	Cecil County, MD	W 44–0	
November 8	Pennsylvania Military College freshmen		W 14–13	
November 16	Williamson College of the Trades		Cancelled	
