= 1929 Louisville Cardinals football team =

American college football season

1929 Louisville Cardinals football
- Conference: Southern Intercollegiate Athletic Association
- Record: 3–5 (1–3 SIAA)
- Head coach: Tom King (5th season)
- Home stadium: Parkway Field

1929 Southern Intercollegiate Athletic Association football standings
	Conf.					Overall
Team	W		L		T	W		L		T
Chattanooga $	7	–	0	–	0	8	–	2	–	0
Spring Hill	4	–	0	–	0	7	–	1	–	0
Centre	4	–	0	–	1	5	–	3	–	1
The Citadel	4	–	0	–	1	5	–	4	–	1
Louisiana College	3	–	0	–	1	6	–	2	–	1
Centenary	1	–	0	–	0	6	–	3	–	1
Louisiana Normal	1	–	0	–	2	4	–	3	–	2
Furman	4	–	1	–	1	5	–	4	–	1
Stetson	3	–	1	–	0	5	–	1	–	0
Millsaps	3	–	1	–	2	6	–	1	–	3
Southwestern (TN)	2	–	1	–	0	5	–	3	–	0
Transylvania	2	–	1	–	2	6	–	4	–	3
Miami (FL)	3	–	2	–	0	3	–	2	–	0
Erskine	3	–	2	–	0	6	–	3	–	0
Birmingham–Southern	4	–	3	–	0	4	–	4	–	0
Western Kentucky State Normal	3	–	3	–	0	7	–	3	–	0
Howard (AL)	3	–	3	–	2	5	–	4	–	2
Presbyterian	3	–	3	–	0	4	–	4	–	1
Georgetown (KY)	2	–	3	–	0	4	–	5	–	0
Wofford	2	–	3	–	0	3	–	6	–	0
Oglethorpe	1	–	2	–	0	5	–	4	–	1
Kentucky Wesleyan	1	–	3	–	0	5	–	4	–	0
Louisiana Tech	1	–	3	–	2	3	–	4	–	3
Louisville	1	–	3	–	0	3	–	5	–	0
Southern College	1	–	3	–	0	2	–	5	–	0
Mercer	2	–	5	–	0	2	–	7	–	0
Mississippi College	1	–	4	–	1	3	–	6	–	1
SW Louisiana	1	–	5	–	0	2	–	7	–	0
Union (TN)	0	–	5	–	1	1	–	5	–	1
Newberry	0	–	5	–	0	0	–	7	–	1
Rollins	0	–	5	–	0	0	–	5	–	0
$ – Conference champion

The 1929 Louisville Cardinals football team was an American football team that represented the University of Louisville as a member of the Southern Intercollegiate Athletic Association (SIAA) during the 1929 college football season. In their fifth season under head coach Tom King, the Cardinals compiled an overall record of 3–5 with a mark of 1–3 in SIAA play.

== Schedule ==
Date	Opponent	Site	Result
October 2	Cincinnati*	Louisville, KY (rivalry)	L 0–7
October 11	at Transylvania	Lexington, KY	L 0–9
October 19	Western Kentucky State Normal	Louisville, KY	L 0–13
October 26	at Marshall*	Huntington, WV	L 6–25
November 2	at Eastern Kentucky*	Richmond, KY	W 19–6
November 9	Centre	Louisville, KY	L 0–41
November 16	Earlham*	Louisville, KY	W 6–0
November 23	Georgetown (KY)	Louisville, KY	W 6–0
*Non-conference game
