= 1929 Howard Bulldogs football team =

American college football season

1929 Howard Bulldogs football
- Conference: Southern Intercollegiate Athletic Association
- Record: 5–4–2 (3–3–2 SIAA)
- Head coach: Eddie McLane (1st season)
- Home stadium: Legion Field

1929 Southern Intercollegiate Athletic Association football standings
| | Conf. | | | | | Overall |
| Team | W | | L | | T | W | | L | | T |
|---|---|---|---|---|---|---|---|---|---|---|
| Chattanooga $ | 7 | – | 0 | – | 0 | 8 | – | 2 | – | 0 |
| Spring Hill | 4 | – | 0 | – | 0 | 7 | – | 1 | – | 0 |
| Centre | 4 | – | 0 | – | 1 | 5 | – | 3 | – | 1 |
| The Citadel | 4 | – | 0 | – | 1 | 5 | – | 4 | – | 1 |
| Louisiana College | 3 | – | 0 | – | 1 | 6 | – | 2 | – | 1 |
| Centenary | 1 | – | 0 | – | 0 | 6 | – | 3 | – | 1 |
| Louisiana Normal | 1 | – | 0 | – | 2 | 4 | – | 3 | – | 2 |
| Furman | 4 | – | 1 | – | 1 | 5 | – | 4 | – | 1 |
| Stetson | 3 | – | 1 | – | 0 | 5 | – | 1 | – | 0 |
| Millsaps | 3 | – | 1 | – | 2 | 6 | – | 1 | – | 3 |
| Southwestern (TN) | 2 | – | 1 | – | 0 | 5 | – | 3 | – | 0 |
| Transylvania | 2 | – | 1 | – | 2 | 6 | – | 4 | – | 3 |
| Miami (FL) | 3 | – | 2 | – | 0 | 3 | – | 2 | – | 0 |
| Erskine | 3 | – | 2 | – | 0 | 6 | – | 3 | – | 0 |
| Birmingham–Southern | 4 | – | 3 | – | 0 | 4 | – | 4 | – | 0 |
| Western Kentucky State Normal | 3 | – | 3 | – | 0 | 7 | – | 3 | – | 0 |
| Howard (AL) | 3 | – | 3 | – | 2 | 5 | – | 4 | – | 2 |
| Presbyterian | 3 | – | 3 | – | 0 | 4 | – | 4 | – | 1 |
| Georgetown (KY) | 2 | – | 3 | – | 0 | 4 | – | 5 | – | 0 |
| Wofford | 2 | – | 3 | – | 0 | 3 | – | 6 | – | 0 |
| Oglethorpe | 1 | – | 2 | – | 0 | 5 | – | 4 | – | 1 |
| Kentucky Wesleyan | 1 | – | 3 | – | 0 | 5 | – | 4 | – | 0 |
| Louisiana Tech | 1 | – | 3 | – | 2 | 3 | – | 4 | – | 3 |
| Louisville | 1 | – | 3 | – | 0 | 3 | – | 5 | – | 0 |
| Southern College | 1 | – | 3 | – | 0 | 2 | – | 5 | – | 0 |
| Mercer | 2 | – | 5 | – | 0 | 2 | – | 7 | – | 0 |
| Mississippi College | 1 | – | 4 | – | 1 | 3 | – | 6 | – | 1 |
| SW Louisiana | 1 | – | 5 | – | 0 | 2 | – | 7 | – | 0 |
| Union (TN) | 0 | – | 5 | – | 1 | 1 | – | 5 | – | 1 |
| Newberry | 0 | – | 5 | – | 0 | 0 | – | 7 | – | 1 |
| Rollins | 0 | – | 5 | – | 0 | 0 | – | 5 | – | 0 |
$ – Conference champion

The 1929 Howard Bulldogs football team was an American football team that represented Howard College (now known as the Samford University) as a member of the Southern Intercollegiate Athletic Association (SIAA) during the 1929 college football season. In their first year under head coach Eddie McLane, the team compiled a 5–4–2 record.

== Schedule ==
| Date | Time | Opponent | Site | Result | Attendance | Source |
|---|---|---|---|---|---|---|
| September 20 | | at Marion* | Rowell Field; Selma, AL | W 31–0 | | |
| September 27 | | Cumberland (TN)* | Legion Field; Birmingham, AL | W 41–0 | | |
| October 5 | | Millsaps | Legion Field; Birmingham, AL | T 0–0 | | |
| October 11 | | at Mississippi College | Provine Field; Clinton, MS | T 0–0 | | |
| October 19 | | at Mercer | Centennial Stadium; Macon, GA | L 2–7 | | |
| October 26 | | at Auburn* | Drake Field; Auburn, AL | L 0–6 | | |
| November 2 | | Union (TN) | Legion Field; Birmingham, AL | W 51–0 | | |
| November 9 | | at Chattanooga | Chamberlain Field; Chattanooga, TN | L 14–20 | | |
| November 23 | | vs. Birmingham–Southern | Legion Field; Birmingham, AL | W 7–6 | 13,000 | |
| November 28 | 3:15 p.m. | at Miami (FL) | Miami High School Field; Miami, FL | L 0–7 | | |
| November 30 | | vs. Stetson | Burgoyne Isle; Daytona Beach, FL | W 14–13 | | |
*Non-conference game; All times are in Central time
