= 1929 William & Mary Indians football team =

American college football season

1929 William & Mary Indians football

Virginia Conference champion
- Conference: Virginia Conference
- Record: 8–2 (5–0 Virginia)
- Head coach: Branch Bocock (2nd season)
- Captain: Ted Bauserman

1929 Virginia Conference football standings
	Conf.					Overall
Team	W		L		T	W		L		T
William & Mary $	5	–	0	–	0	8	–	2	–	0
Hampden–Sydney	4	–	1	–	0	4	–	5	–	0
Emory and Henry	3	–	1	–	0	7	–	2	–	1
Roanoke	2	–	3	–	2	2	–	5	–	2
Richmond	2	–	3	–	1	3	–	5	–	1
Randolph–Macon	2	–	3	–	0	2	–	5	–	0
Lynchburg	1	–	3	–	1	1	–	6	–	1
Bridgewater	0	–	5	–	0	0	–	7	–	0
$ – Conference champion

The 1929 William & Mary Indians football team represented the College of William & Mary as a member of the Virginia Conference during the 1929 college football season. Led by second-year head coach Branch Bocock, the Indians compiled an overall record of 8–2 with a mark of 5–0 in conference play, winning the Virginia Conference title.

== Schedule ==
Date	Time	Opponent	Site	Result	Attendance	Source
September 28		St. John's (MD)*	Cary Field; Williamsburg, VA	W 19–0	5,000	
October 5		at Navy*	Thompson Stadium; Annapolis, MD	L 0–15		
October 12		at Emory and Henry	Fullerton Field; Emory, VA	W 7–6		
October 19		vs. VPI*	City Stadium; Richmond, VA	L 14–25	12,000	
October 26		Bridgewater	Cary Field; Williamsburg, VA	W 59–0		
November 2		George Washington*	Cary Field; Williamsburg, VA	W 51–6		
November 11		at Roanoke	Maher Field; Roanoke, VA	W 19–6	2,000–2,500	
November 16		Catholic University*	Cary Field; Williamsburg, VA	W 36–13		
November 28		at Richmond	City Stadium; Richmond, VA (rivalry)	W 25–0		
December 7	2:30 p.m.	vs. Hampden–Sydney	City Stadium; Richmond, VA	W 20–6	6,000	
*Non-conference game; All times are in Eastern time
