= 1929 Miami Hurricanes football team =

American college football season

1929 Miami Hurricanes football
- Conference: Southern Intercollegiate Athletic Association
- Record: 3–2 (3–2 SIAA)
- Head coach: J. Burton Rix (1st season)
- Home stadium: Miami High School Field; University Stadium

1929 Southern Intercollegiate Athletic Association football standings
	Conf.					Overall
Team	W		L		T	W		L		T
Chattanooga $	7	–	0	–	0	8	–	2	–	0
Spring Hill	4	–	0	–	0	7	–	1	–	0
Centre	4	–	0	–	1	5	–	3	–	1
The Citadel	4	–	0	–	1	5	–	4	–	1
Louisiana College	3	–	0	–	1	6	–	2	–	1
Centenary	1	–	0	–	0	6	–	3	–	1
Louisiana Normal	1	–	0	–	2	4	–	3	–	2
Furman	4	–	1	–	1	5	–	4	–	1
Stetson	3	–	1	–	0	5	–	1	–	0
Millsaps	3	–	1	–	2	6	–	1	–	3
Southwestern (TN)	2	–	1	–	0	5	–	3	–	0
Transylvania	2	–	1	–	2	6	–	4	–	3
Miami (FL)	3	–	2	–	0	3	–	2	–	0
Erskine	3	–	2	–	0	6	–	3	–	0
Birmingham–Southern	4	–	3	–	0	4	–	4	–	0
Western Kentucky State Normal	3	–	3	–	0	7	–	3	–	0
Howard (AL)	3	–	3	–	2	5	–	4	–	2
Presbyterian	3	–	3	–	0	4	–	4	–	1
Georgetown (KY)	2	–	3	–	0	4	–	5	–	0
Wofford	2	–	3	–	0	3	–	6	–	0
Oglethorpe	1	–	2	–	0	5	–	4	–	1
Kentucky Wesleyan	1	–	3	–	0	5	–	4	–	0
Louisiana Tech	1	–	3	–	2	3	–	4	–	3
Louisville	1	–	3	–	0	3	–	5	–	0
Southern College	1	–	3	–	0	2	–	5	–	0
Mercer	2	–	5	–	0	2	–	7	–	0
Mississippi College	1	–	4	–	1	3	–	6	–	1
SW Louisiana	1	–	5	–	0	2	–	7	–	0
Union (TN)	0	–	5	–	1	1	–	5	–	1
Newberry	0	–	5	–	0	0	–	7	–	1
Rollins	0	–	5	–	0	0	–	5	–	0
$ – Conference champion

The 1929 Miami Hurricanes football team represented the University of Miami as a member of Southern Intercollegiate Athletic Association (SIAA) in the 1929 college football season. The Hurricanes played their home games at Tamiami Park in Miami, Florida. The team was coached by J. Burton Rix, in his first and only year as head coach for the Hurricanes.

== Schedule ==
Date	Time	Opponent	Site	Result	Attendance	Source
October 19	3:00 p.m.	Southern College	Miami High School Field; Miami, FL	W 6–0	1,500	
October 26	3:30 p.m.	Rollins	University Stadium; Coral Gables, FL	W 32–0	1,000	
November 2		at Southwestern Louisiana	Campus Athletic Field; Lafayette, LA	L 0–14		
November 16	3:00 p.m.	Stetson	Miami High School Field; Miami, FL	L 0–12	4,000	
November 28	3:15 p.m.	Howard (AL)	Miami High School Field; Miami, FL	W 7–0		
All times are in Eastern time
