= J. W. Stephenson =

American football, basketball and baseball coach

Biographical details
- Born: September 2, 1883
- Died: November 22, 1964 (aged 81); Gadsden, Alabama, U.S.
- Education: Alabama (BS); Columbia (MS)

Coaching career (HC unless noted)

Football
- 1920–1921: Jacksonville State
- 1928: Jacksonville HS (AL)
- 1929–1930: Jacksonville State

Basketball
- 1928–1951: Jacksonville State

Baseball
- 1948–1954: Jacksonville State

Head coaching record
- Overall: 21–9–4 (college football); 225–47 (college basketball); 69–41 (college baseball)

Julian Wilson Stephenson (September 2, 1883 – November 22, 1964) was an American football, basketball and baseball coach. He served as the head football coach at Jacksonville State Normal School—now known as Jacksonville State University—in Jacksonville, Alabama from 1920 to 1921 and again from 1929 to 1930, compiling a record of 21–9–4. Stephenson was also the head basketball coach at Jacksonville State from 1928 to 1951, and school's head baseball coach from 1948 to 1954.

Stephenson was a student at the University of Alabama. He was also the head football coach at Jacksonville High School in 1928. Stephenson was the brother of Alabama football star and Major League Baseball player Riggs Stephenson. He died on November 22, 1964, at a hospital in Gadsden, Alabama.

== Head coaching record ==
=== College football ===
Year	Team	Overall	Conference	Standing	Bowl/playoffs
Jacksonville State Eagle Owls (Independent) (1920–1921)
1920	Jacksonville State	7–1–1			
1921	Jacksonville State	5–2–2			
Jacksonville State Eagle Owls (Independent) (1929–1930)
1929	Jacksonville State	5–3			
1930	Jacksonville State	4–3–1			
Jacksonville State:		21–9–4			
Total:		21–9–4			
