= Johns Hopkins–McDaniel football rivalry =

American intercollegiate football rivalry

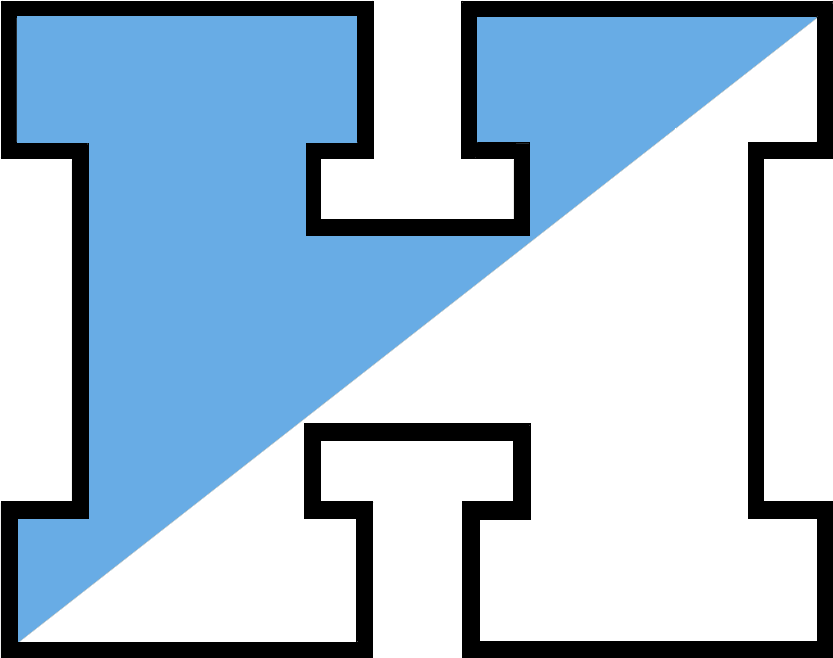
- Johns Hopkins Blue Jays McDaniel Green Terror
- First meeting: October 1894; Western Maryland 16, Johns Hopkins 0
- Latest meeting: November 7, 2026; Johns Hopkins 54, McDaniel 6
- Next meeting: 2027
- Trophy: Maryland Railroad Lantern

Statistics
- Total meetings: 104
- All-time series: Johns Hopkins leads, 64–35–5
- Largest victory: Johns Hopkins, 58–7 (2023)
- Longest win streak: Johns Hopkins, 25 (2001–present)
- Current win streak: Johns Hopkins, 25 (2001–present)
- Locations of the two schools.

Locations of Johns Hopkins and McDaniel

The Johns Hopkins–McDaniel football rivalry is an American college football rivalry between the McDaniel Green Terror football team of McDaniel College and Johns Hopkins Blue Jays football team of Johns Hopkins University. Up until 2024, it was the last game in the regular season for both respective schools. Beginning in 2025, it was scheduled as the penultimate game.

One of the oldest rivalry games in American college football, dating back to 1894, the McDaniel–Hopkins game has been played annually since 1947.

== History ==
For many decades the best college football team in Maryland would get a trophy. Up until 1942 Maryland and Western Maryland were the biggest rivalry in the state. After World War II, Western Maryland college decided to no longer play against larger schools and instead play what is considered to be its "natural rivals." In 1947, Western Maryland and Johns Hopkins began the tradition of having the last game of the regular season be played against each other. Starting in 1946 both schools joined the Mason–Dixon Conference have always continued to be in the same conference together for football.

The origin of the Maryland Railroad Lantern Trophy is traced back to Vincent Chesney, an alumnus of McDaniel College. He recognized the history of the rivalry that lacked a trophy and wanted to honor that rivalry as his brother Bob Chesney was associate head coach at Johns Hopkins. The trophy was first awarded in 2009.

== 2023 100th Game ==
Johns Hopkins (9–0, 5–0 CC) returned to Homewood Field to face McDaniel (0–9, 0–5 CC) for the regular season finale for both teams. The result saw Hopkins clinch the outright conference title with their seventeenth consecutive home victory.

== Game results ==
Rankings are complete from 2001 onwards.

Johns Hopkins victories	McDaniel victories	Tie games

No.	Date	Location	Winner	Score
1	1894	Westminster, MD	Western Maryland	16–0
2	1897	Westminster, MD	Western Maryland	10–0
3	1898	Baltimore, MD	Johns Hopkins	10–0
4	1899	Westminster, MD	Johns Hopkins	12–0
5	1900	Baltimore, MD	Johns Hopkins	16–0
6	1901	Baltimore, MD	Johns Hopkins	11–0
7	1902	Westminster, MD	Tie	6–6
8	1904	Westminster, MD	Tie	0–0
9	1907	Baltimore, MD	Johns Hopkins	4–0
10	1908	Baltimore, MD	Tie	4–4
11	1909	Baltimore, MD	Johns Hopkins	18–16
12	1910	Baltimore, MD	Johns Hopkins	15–5
13	1911	Baltimore, MD	Western Maryland	6–0
14	1912	Baltimore, MD	Western Maryland	13–6
15	1913	Baltimore, MD	Western Maryland	12–0
16	1914	Baltimore, MD	Western Maryland	6–0
17	1915	Baltimore, MD	Johns Hopkins	35–12
18	1916	Baltimore, MD	Western Maryland	21–0
19	1917	Baltimore, MD	Johns Hopkins	9–0
20	1918	Baltimore, MD	Western Maryland	28–0
21	1919	Baltimore, MD	Johns Hopkins	31–6
22	1920	Baltimore, MD	Johns Hopkins	49–0
23	1921	Baltimore, MD	Johns Hopkins	44–0
24	1922	Baltimore, MD	Johns Hopkins	35–0
25	1923	Baltimore, MD	Johns Hopkins	17–0
26	1931	Baltimore, MD	Western Maryland	40–0
27	1947	Baltimore, MD	Tie	14–14
28	1948	Westminster, MD	Johns Hopkins	7–6
29	1949	Baltimore, MD	Western Maryland	35–7
30	1950	Westminster, MD	Western Maryland	14–6
31	1951	Baltimore, MD	Western Maryland	33–6
32	1952	Westminster, MD	Johns Hopkins	12–0
33	1953	Baltimore, MD	Western Maryland	46–0
34	1954	Westminster, MD	Western Maryland	12–7
35	1955	Baltimore, MD	Johns Hopkins	33–0
36	1956	Westminster, MD	Johns Hopkins	7–0
37	1957	Baltimore, MD	Johns Hopkins	19–0
38	1958	Westminster, MD	Western Maryland	20–13
39	1959	Baltimore, MD	Johns Hopkins	10–0
40	1960	Westminster, MD	Western Maryland	18–17
41	1961	Baltimore, MD	Western Maryland	30–6
42	1962	Westminster, MD	Western Maryland	14–6
43	1964	Westminster, MD	Western Maryland	35–12
44	1965	Baltimore, MD	Johns Hopkins	24–6
45	1966	Westminster, MD	Western Maryland	33–7
46	1967	Baltimore, MD	Johns Hopkins	13–6
47	1968	Westminster, MD	Johns Hopkins	46–23
48	1969	Baltimore, MD	Western Maryland	30–27
49	1970	Westminster, MD	Western Maryland	36–20
50	1971	Baltimore, MD	Johns Hopkins	14–13
51	1972	Westminster, MD	Johns Hopkins	27–9
52	1973	Baltimore, MD	Johns Hopkins	16–8
53	1974	Westminster, MD	Western Maryland	28–21

No.	Date	Location	Winner	Score
54	1975	Baltimore, MD	Johns Hopkins	21–11
55	1976	Westminster, MD	Western Maryland	29–7
56	1977	Baltimore, MD	Western Maryland	21–13
57	1978	Westminster, MD	Western Maryland	27–13
58	1979	Baltimore, MD	Western Maryland	9–0
59	1980	Westminster, MD	Western Maryland	35–30
60	1981	Baltimore, MD	Johns Hopkins	20–14
61	1982	Westminster, MD	Western Maryland	22–0
62	1983	Westminster, MD	Johns Hopkins	21–3
63	1984	Baltimore, MD	Johns Hopkins	26–0
64	1985	Westminster, MD	Johns Hopkins	30–7
65	1986	Baltimore, MD	Johns Hopkins	21–20
66	1987	Westminster, MD	Johns Hopkins	21–16
67	1988	Baltimore, MD	Johns Hopkins	14–7
68	1989	Westminster, MD	Johns Hopkins	31–13
69	1990	Baltimore, MD	Johns Hopkins	31–21
70	1991	Westminster, MD	Western Maryland	24–21
71	1992	Baltimore, MD	Johns Hopkins	21–9
72	1993	Westminster, MD	Western Maryland	20–3
73	1994	Baltimore, MD	Johns Hopkins	28–21
74	1995	Westminster, MD	Tie	14–14
75	1996	Baltimore, MD	Johns Hopkins	13–3
76	1997	Westminster, MD	Western Maryland	21–3
77	1998	Baltimore, MD	Western Maryland	17–0
78	1999	Westminster, MD	Western Maryland	37–7
79	2000	Baltimore, MD	Western Maryland	41–7
80	2001	Westminster, MD	Johns Hopkins	21–14
81	2002	Baltimore, MD	Johns Hopkins	27–7
82	2003	Westminster, MD	Johns Hopkins	17–3
83	2004	Baltimore, MD	Johns Hopkins	12–9
84	2005	Westminster, MD	Johns Hopkins	14–5
85	2006	Baltimore, MD	Johns Hopkins	48–7
86	2007	Westminster, MD	Johns Hopkins	31–3
87	2008	Baltimore, MD	Johns Hopkins	27–10
88	2009	Westminster, MD	Johns Hopkins	38–14
89	2010	Baltimore, MD	Johns Hopkins	34–10
90	2011	Westminster, MD	No. 12 Johns Hopkins	28–24
91	2012	Baltimore, MD	No. 16 Johns Hopkins	49–7
92	2013	Westminster, MD	No. 12 Johns Hopkins	52–21
93	2014	Baltimore, MD	No. 7 Johns Hopkins	48–17
94	2015	Westminster, MD	No. 8 Johns Hopkins	49–24
95	2016	Baltimore, MD	No. 7 Johns Hopkins	48–28
96	2017	Westminster, MD	No. 21 Johns Hopkins	56–21
97	2018	Baltimore, MD	No. 16 Johns Hopkins	42–17
98	2019	Westminster, MD	Johns Hopkins	42–0
99	2021	Westminster, MD	No. 17 Johns Hopkins	48–7
100	2022	Baltimore, MD	No. 18 Johns Hopkins	44–7
101	2023	Baltimore, MD	No. 8 Johns Hopkins	58–7
102	2024	Westminster, MD	No. 18 Johns Hopkins	35–0
103	2025	Baltimore, MD	No. 3 Johns Hopkins	42–0
104	2026	Westminster, MD	Johns Hopkins	54–6
Series: Johns Hopkins leads 64–35–5

== See also ==
- List of NCAA college football rivalry games
