= 1929 Richmond Spiders football team =

American college football season

1929 Richmond Spiders football
- Conference: Virginia Conference
- Record: 3–5–1 (2–3–1 Virginia)
- Head coach: Frank Dobson (16th season)
- Captain: Douglas Gunter
- Home stadium: City Stadium

1929 Virginia Conference football standings
| | Conf. | | | | | Overall |
| Team | W | | L | | T | W | | L | | T |
|---|---|---|---|---|---|---|---|---|---|---|
| William & Mary $ | 5 | – | 0 | – | 0 | 8 | – | 2 | – | 0 |
| Hampden–Sydney | 4 | – | 1 | – | 0 | 4 | – | 5 | – | 0 |
| Emory and Henry | 3 | – | 1 | – | 0 | 7 | – | 2 | – | 1 |
| Roanoke | 2 | – | 3 | – | 2 | 2 | – | 5 | – | 2 |
| Richmond | 2 | – | 3 | – | 1 | 3 | – | 5 | – | 1 |
| Randolph–Macon | 2 | – | 3 | – | 0 | 2 | – | 5 | – | 0 |
| Lynchburg | 1 | – | 3 | – | 1 | 1 | – | 6 | – | 1 |
| Bridgewater | 0 | – | 5 | – | 0 | 0 | – | 7 | – | 0 |
$ – Conference champion

The 1929 Richmond Spiders football team was an American football team that represented the University of Richmond as a member of the Virginia Conference during the 1929 college football season. Led by 16th-year head coach, Frank Dobson, Richmond compiled an overall record of 3–5–1. City Stadium opened as Richmond's new home field.

== Schedule ==
| Date | Time | Opponent | Site | Result | Source |
|---|---|---|---|---|---|
| September 28 | | at VMI* | Alumni Field; Lexington, VA (rivalry) | L 0–40 | |
| October 5 | 2:30 p.m. | Wake Forest* | City Stadium; Richmond, VA | L 0–19 | |
| October 12 | | Johns Hopkins* | City Stadium; Richmond, VA | W 31–7 | |
| October 19 | | at Lynchburg | Lynchburg, VA | W 19–6 | |
| October 26 | | at Emory and Henry | Emory, VA | L 0–26 | |
| November 2 | | Roanoke | City Stadium; Richmond, VA | T 6–6 | |
| November 9 | | Randolph–Macon | City Stadium; Richmond, VA | W 9–0 | |
| November 16 | | Hampden–Sydney | City Stadium; Richmond, VA | L 8–13 | |
| November 28 | | William & Mary | City Stadium; Richmond, VA (rivalry) | L 0–25 | |
*Non-conference game; All times are in Eastern time
