= 1929 Middle Tennessee State Teachers football team =

American college football season

1929 Middle Tennessee State Teachers football
- Conference: Independent
- Record: 6–3–1
- Head coach: Frank Faulkinberry (4th season)
- Captain: John Dixon

1929 Southern college football independents records
	Conf.			Overall
Team	W	L	T	W		L		T
Western Maryland		–		11	–	0	–	0
Delaware State		–		1	–	0	–	0
Guilford		–		7	–	1	–	1
Texas Mines		–		6	–	1	–	2
Appalachian State		–		4	–	1	–	3
Navy		–		6	–	2	–	2
Georgetown		–		5	–	2	–	2
South Georgia Teachers		–		5	–	2	–	2
Middle Tennessee State Teachers		–		6	–	3	–	1
Beacom College		–		3	–	2	–	0
Wake Forest		–		6	–	5	–	1
Catholic University		–		5	–	4	–	0
West Virginia		–		4	–	3	–	3
Loyola (LA)		–		4	–	4	–	2
Davidson		–		5	–	5	–	0
Texas A&I		–		3	–	4	–	1
East Tennessee State Teachers		–		2	–	5	–	1
Mississippi State Teachers		–		2	–	6	–	1
Texas Tech		–		1	–	7	–	2
Delaware		–		0	–	7	–	1
George Washington		–		0	–	8	–	0

The 1929 Middle Tennessee State Teachers football team represented the Middle Tennessee State Teachers College (now known as Middle Tennessee State University) during the 1929 college football season. The team captain was John Dixon.

== Schedule ==
Date	Opponent	Site	Result	Source
September 21	at Chattanooga	Chamberlain Field; Chattanooga, TN	L 0–40	
September 28	Western Kentucky State Normal	Bowling Green, KY (rivalry)	L 0–19	
October 5	at Cumberland (TN)	Lebanon, TN	W 6–0	
October 12	Jacksonville State	Murfreesboro, TN	W 21–7	
October 18	at Maryville (TN)	Maryville, TN	L 0–7	
October 26	Vanderbilt freshmen	Murfreesboro, TN	W 13–0	
November 2	at Murray State	Cutchin Stadium; Murray, KY	W 6–0	
November 8	Sewanee freshmen	Murfreesboro, TN	W 13–7	
November 16	Piedmont	Murfreesboro, TN	W 13–0	
November 26	at Tennessee Tech	Cookeville, TN	T 13–13	
