= 1929 Birmingham–Southern Panthers football team =

American college football season

1929 Birmingham–Southern Panthers football
- Conference: Southern Intercollegiate Athletic Association
- Record: 4–4 (4–3 SIAA)
- Head coach: Jenks Gillem (2nd season)
- Home stadium: Legion Field

1929 Southern Intercollegiate Athletic Association football standings
	Conf.					Overall
Team	W		L		T	W		L		T
Chattanooga $	7	–	0	–	0	8	–	2	–	0
Spring Hill	4	–	0	–	0	7	–	1	–	0
Centre	4	–	0	–	1	5	–	3	–	1
The Citadel	4	–	0	–	1	5	–	4	–	1
Louisiana College	3	–	0	–	1	6	–	2	–	1
Centenary	1	–	0	–	0	6	–	3	–	1
Louisiana Normal	1	–	0	–	2	4	–	3	–	2
Furman	4	–	1	–	1	5	–	4	–	1
Stetson	3	–	1	–	0	5	–	1	–	0
Millsaps	3	–	1	–	2	6	–	1	–	3
Southwestern (TN)	2	–	1	–	0	5	–	3	–	0
Transylvania	2	–	1	–	2	6	–	4	–	3
Miami (FL)	3	–	2	–	0	3	–	2	–	0
Erskine	3	–	2	–	0	6	–	3	–	0
Birmingham–Southern	4	–	3	–	0	4	–	4	–	0
Western Kentucky State Normal	3	–	3	–	0	7	–	3	–	0
Howard (AL)	3	–	3	–	2	5	–	4	–	2
Presbyterian	3	–	3	–	0	4	–	4	–	1
Georgetown (KY)	2	–	3	–	0	4	–	5	–	0
Wofford	2	–	3	–	0	3	–	6	–	0
Oglethorpe	1	–	2	–	0	5	–	4	–	1
Kentucky Wesleyan	1	–	3	–	0	5	–	4	–	0
Louisiana Tech	1	–	3	–	2	3	–	4	–	3
Louisville	1	–	3	–	0	3	–	5	–	0
Southern College	1	–	3	–	0	2	–	5	–	0
Mercer	2	–	5	–	0	2	–	7	–	0
Mississippi College	1	–	4	–	1	3	–	6	–	1
SW Louisiana	1	–	5	–	0	2	–	7	–	0
Union (TN)	0	–	5	–	1	1	–	5	–	1
Newberry	0	–	5	–	0	0	–	7	–	1
Rollins	0	–	5	–	0	0	–	5	–	0
$ – Conference champion

The 1929 Birmingham–Southern Panthers football team was an American football team that represented Birmingham–Southern College as a member of the Southern Intercollegiate Athletic Association during the 1929 college football season. In their second season under head coach Jenks Gillem, the team compiled a 4–4 record.

== Schedule ==
Date	Opponent	Site	Result	Attendance	Source
September 27	at Auburn*	Cramton Bowl; Montgomery, AL	L 0–6	7,500	
October 4	Spring Hill	Legion Field; Birmingham, AL	L 6–15		
October 11	Mercer	Legion Field; Birmingham, AL	W 39–7		
October 19	at Chattanooga	Chamberlain Field; Chattanooga, TN	L 7–13		
October 26	at Union (TN)	Jackson, TN	W 31–0		
November 2	at Millsaps	Municipal Stadium; Jackson, MS	W 20–7		
November 9	Mississippi College	Legion Field; Birmingham, AL	W 20–0		
November 23	vs. Howard (AL)	Legion Field; Birmingham, AL	L 6–7		
*Non-conference game
