= 1929 Centenary Gentlemen football team =

American college football season

1929 Centenary Gentlemen football
- Conference: Southern Intercollegiate Athletic Association
- Record: 6–3–1 (1–0 SIAA)
- Head coach: Homer Norton (7th season)
- Home stadium: Fairgrounds Stadium

1929 Southern Intercollegiate Athletic Association football standings
	Conf.					Overall
Team	W		L		T	W		L		T
Chattanooga $	7	–	0	–	0	8	–	2	–	0
Spring Hill	4	–	0	–	0	7	–	1	–	0
Centre	4	–	0	–	1	5	–	3	–	1
The Citadel	4	–	0	–	1	5	–	4	–	1
Louisiana College	3	–	0	–	1	6	–	2	–	1
Centenary	1	–	0	–	0	6	–	3	–	1
Louisiana Normal	1	–	0	–	2	4	–	3	–	2
Furman	4	–	1	–	1	5	–	4	–	1
Stetson	3	–	1	–	0	5	–	1	–	0
Millsaps	3	–	1	–	2	6	–	1	–	3
Southwestern (TN)	2	–	1	–	0	5	–	3	–	0
Transylvania	2	–	1	–	2	6	–	4	–	3
Miami (FL)	3	–	2	–	0	3	–	2	–	0
Erskine	3	–	2	–	0	6	–	3	–	0
Birmingham–Southern	4	–	3	–	0	4	–	4	–	0
Western Kentucky State Normal	3	–	3	–	0	7	–	3	–	0
Howard (AL)	3	–	3	–	2	5	–	4	–	2
Presbyterian	3	–	3	–	0	4	–	4	–	1
Georgetown (KY)	2	–	3	–	0	4	–	5	–	0
Wofford	2	–	3	–	0	3	–	6	–	0
Oglethorpe	1	–	2	–	0	5	–	4	–	1
Kentucky Wesleyan	1	–	3	–	0	5	–	4	–	0
Louisiana Tech	1	–	3	–	2	3	–	4	–	3
Louisville	1	–	3	–	0	3	–	5	–	0
Southern College	1	–	3	–	0	2	–	5	–	0
Mercer	2	–	5	–	0	2	–	7	–	0
Mississippi College	1	–	4	–	1	3	–	6	–	1
SW Louisiana	1	–	5	–	0	2	–	7	–	0
Union (TN)	0	–	5	–	1	1	–	5	–	1
Newberry	0	–	5	–	0	0	–	7	–	1
Rollins	0	–	5	–	0	0	–	5	–	0
$ – Conference champion

The 1929 Centenary Gentlemen football team was an American football team that represented the Centenary College of Louisiana as a member of the Southern Intercollegiate Athletic Association (SIAA) during the 1929 college football season. In their seventh year under head coach Homer Norton, the team compiled an 6–3–1 record.

== Schedule ==
Date	Opponent	Site	Result	Attendance	Source
September 28	East Texas State*	Fairgrounds Stadium; Shreveport, LA	W 62–0	4,000	
October 5	at Texas*	War Memorial Stadium; Austin, TX	L 0–20		
October 12	TCU*	Fairgrounds Stadium; Shreveport, LA	L 0–28	4,500	
October 19	Sam Houston State*	Fairgrounds Stadium; Shreveport, LA	W 35–0		
October 26	Baylor*	Fairgrounds Stadium; Shreveport, LA	W 27–12		
November 9	Henderson State*	Fairgrounds Stadium; Shreveport, LA	T 0–0		
November 16	at Arkansas*	The Hill; Fayetteville, AR	L 2–13	5,000	
November 23	Louisiana Tech	Fairgrounds Stadium; Shreveport, LA	W 19–0		
November 28	Central State Teachers*	Fairgrounds Stadium; Shreveport, LA	W 9–0		
December 7	at Loyola (LA)*	Loyola Stadium; New Orleans, LA	W 6–0	3,000	
*Non-conference game
