= 1929 Mercer Bears football team =

American college football season

1929 Mercer Bears football
- Conference: Southern Intercollegiate Athletic Association
- Record: 2–7 (2–5 SIAA)
- Head coach: Lake Russell (1st season)
- Home stadium: Centennial Stadium

1929 Southern Intercollegiate Athletic Association football standings
| | Conf. | | | | | Overall |
| Team | W | | L | | T | W | | L | | T |
|---|---|---|---|---|---|---|---|---|---|---|
| Chattanooga $ | 7 | – | 0 | – | 0 | 8 | – | 2 | – | 0 |
| Spring Hill | 4 | – | 0 | – | 0 | 7 | – | 1 | – | 0 |
| Centre | 4 | – | 0 | – | 1 | 5 | – | 3 | – | 1 |
| The Citadel | 4 | – | 0 | – | 1 | 5 | – | 4 | – | 1 |
| Louisiana College | 3 | – | 0 | – | 1 | 6 | – | 2 | – | 1 |
| Centenary | 1 | – | 0 | – | 0 | 6 | – | 3 | – | 1 |
| Louisiana Normal | 1 | – | 0 | – | 2 | 4 | – | 3 | – | 2 |
| Furman | 4 | – | 1 | – | 1 | 5 | – | 4 | – | 1 |
| Stetson | 3 | – | 1 | – | 0 | 5 | – | 1 | – | 0 |
| Millsaps | 3 | – | 1 | – | 2 | 6 | – | 1 | – | 3 |
| Southwestern (TN) | 2 | – | 1 | – | 0 | 5 | – | 3 | – | 0 |
| Transylvania | 2 | – | 1 | – | 2 | 6 | – | 4 | – | 3 |
| Miami (FL) | 3 | – | 2 | – | 0 | 3 | – | 2 | – | 0 |
| Erskine | 3 | – | 2 | – | 0 | 6 | – | 3 | – | 0 |
| Birmingham–Southern | 4 | – | 3 | – | 0 | 4 | – | 4 | – | 0 |
| Western Kentucky State Normal | 3 | – | 3 | – | 0 | 7 | – | 3 | – | 0 |
| Howard (AL) | 3 | – | 3 | – | 2 | 5 | – | 4 | – | 2 |
| Presbyterian | 3 | – | 3 | – | 0 | 4 | – | 4 | – | 1 |
| Georgetown (KY) | 2 | – | 3 | – | 0 | 4 | – | 5 | – | 0 |
| Wofford | 2 | – | 3 | – | 0 | 3 | – | 6 | – | 0 |
| Oglethorpe | 1 | – | 2 | – | 0 | 5 | – | 4 | – | 1 |
| Kentucky Wesleyan | 1 | – | 3 | – | 0 | 5 | – | 4 | – | 0 |
| Louisiana Tech | 1 | – | 3 | – | 2 | 3 | – | 4 | – | 3 |
| Louisville | 1 | – | 3 | – | 0 | 3 | – | 5 | – | 0 |
| Southern College | 1 | – | 3 | – | 0 | 2 | – | 5 | – | 0 |
| Mercer | 2 | – | 5 | – | 0 | 2 | – | 7 | – | 0 |
| Mississippi College | 1 | – | 4 | – | 1 | 3 | – | 6 | – | 1 |
| SW Louisiana | 1 | – | 5 | – | 0 | 2 | – | 7 | – | 0 |
| Union (TN) | 0 | – | 5 | – | 1 | 1 | – | 5 | – | 1 |
| Newberry | 0 | – | 5 | – | 0 | 0 | – | 7 | – | 1 |
| Rollins | 0 | – | 5 | – | 0 | 0 | – | 5 | – | 0 |
$ – Conference champion

The 1929 Mercer Bears football team was an American football team that represented Mercer University as a member of the Southern Intercollegiate Athletic Association (SIAA) during the 1929 college football season. In their first year under head coach Lake Russell, the team compiled a 2–7 record.

== Schedule ==
| Date | Opponent | Site | Result | Source |
|---|---|---|---|---|
| September 28 | Duke* | Centennial Stadium; Macon, GA | L 6–19 | |
| October 4 | at Presbyterian | Bailey Stadium; Clinton, SC | L 0–6 | |
| October 11 | at Birmingham–Southern | Legion Field; Birmingham, AL | L 7–39 | |
| October 19 | Howard (AL) | Centennial Stadium; Macon, GA | W 7–2 | |
| October 26 | Chattanooga | Centennial Stadium; Macon, GA | L 0–7 | |
| November 9 | Rollins | Centennial Stadium; Macon, GA | W 59–0 | |
| November 16 | at The Citadel | Johnson Hagood Stadium; Charleston, SC | L 13–21 | |
| November 23 | at Oglethorpe | Hermance Stadium; Atlanta, GA | L 0–26 | |
| November 28 | vs. Wake Forest* | Memorial Stadium; Asheville, NC | L 0–13 | |
*Non-conference game
