= 1929 Simmons Cowboys football team =

American college football season

1929 Simmons Cowboys football
- Conference: Texas Conference
- Record: 5–4–1 (1–3–1 Texas)
- Head coach: Frank Bridges (3rd season)
- Captain: Rufus Hyde
- Home stadium: Parramore Field

1929 Texas Conference football standings
	Conf.					Overall
Team	W		L		T	W		L		T
Howard Payne $	5	–	0	–	0	8	–	0	–	2
St. Edward's	4	–	1	–	0	5	–	4	–	2
Austin	3	–	2	–	0	3	–	6	–	0
Simmons (TX)	1	–	3	–	1	5	–	4	–	1
Trinity (TX)	1	–	3	–	1	3	–	5	–	1
Southwestern (TX)	0	–	5	–	0	2	–	8	–	0
$ – Conference champion

The 1929 Simmons Cowboys football team represented Simmons University—now known as Hardin–Simmons University—as a member of the Texas Conference during 1929 college football season. Led by Frank Bridges in his third and final season as head coach, the team went 5–4–1 overall, tying for fourth place in the Texas Conference with a mark of 1–3–1.

== Schedule ==
Date	Opponent	Site	Result	Attendance	Source
September 28	Texas B team*	West Texas Fairgrounds; Abilene, TX	W 3–0		
October 5	vs. TCU*	Buckaroo Stadium; Breckenridge, TX	L 0–20		
October 19	at Daniel Baker*	Brownwood, TX	W 15–0		
October 26	vs. West Texas State*	Butler Field; Amarillo, TX	W 14–12	6,000	
November 1	Southwestern (TX)	Parramore Field; Abilene, TX	W 13–7		
November 11	at Trinity (TX)	Yoakum Field; Waxahachie, TX	T 0–0		
November 16	Austin	Parramore Field; Abilene, TX	L 0–6		
November 22	St. Edward's	Parramore Field; Abilene, TX	L 0–13		
November 28	Texas Tech*^{†}	Parramore Field; Abilene, TX	W 21–0	5,000	
December 6	Howard Payne	Parramore Field; Abilene, TX	L 0–7		
*Non-conference game; ^{†}Homecoming
