= Deerhurst, Delaware =

Unincorporated community in Delaware, United States

- Unincorporated community
- Location within Delaware Location within the United States
- Coordinates: 39°47′00″N 75°32′29″W
- Country: United States
- State: Delaware
- County: New Castle
- Elevation: 305 ft (93 m)
- Time zone: UTC-5 (Eastern (EST))
  - Summer (DST): UTC-4 (EDT)
- Area code: 302
- GNIS feature ID: 217136

Deerhurst is an unincorporated community in New Castle County, Delaware, United States. Deerhurst is located between U.S. Route 202, Delaware Route 261, and Murphy Road near Fairfax.

== Notable people ==
- John J. Brady, a Delaware Sports Museum and Hall of Fame coach and sportswriter, lived in Deerhurst
