= 1929 Western Kentucky State Normal Hilltoppers football team =

American college football season

1929 Western Kentucky State Normal Hilltoppers football
- Conference: Southern Intercollegiate Athletic Association
- Record: 7–3 (3–3 SIAA)
- Head coach: Carl Anderson (1st season)

1929 Southern Intercollegiate Athletic Association football standings
	Conf.					Overall
Team	W		L		T	W		L		T
Chattanooga $	7	–	0	–	0	8	–	2	–	0
Spring Hill	4	–	0	–	0	7	–	1	–	0
Centre	4	–	0	–	1	5	–	3	–	1
The Citadel	4	–	0	–	1	5	–	4	–	1
Louisiana College	3	–	0	–	1	6	–	2	–	1
Centenary	1	–	0	–	0	6	–	3	–	1
Louisiana Normal	1	–	0	–	2	4	–	3	–	2
Furman	4	–	1	–	1	5	–	4	–	1
Stetson	3	–	1	–	0	5	–	1	–	0
Millsaps	3	–	1	–	2	6	–	1	–	3
Southwestern (TN)	2	–	1	–	0	5	–	3	–	0
Transylvania	2	–	1	–	2	6	–	4	–	3
Miami (FL)	3	–	2	–	0	3	–	2	–	0
Erskine	3	–	2	–	0	6	–	3	–	0
Birmingham–Southern	4	–	3	–	0	4	–	4	–	0
Western Kentucky State Normal	3	–	3	–	0	7	–	3	–	0
Howard (AL)	3	–	3	–	2	5	–	4	–	2
Presbyterian	3	–	3	–	0	4	–	4	–	1
Georgetown (KY)	2	–	3	–	0	4	–	5	–	0
Wofford	2	–	3	–	0	3	–	6	–	0
Oglethorpe	1	–	2	–	0	5	–	4	–	1
Kentucky Wesleyan	1	–	3	–	0	5	–	4	–	0
Louisiana Tech	1	–	3	–	2	3	–	4	–	3
Louisville	1	–	3	–	0	3	–	5	–	0
Southern College	1	–	3	–	0	2	–	5	–	0
Mercer	2	–	5	–	0	2	–	7	–	0
Mississippi College	1	–	4	–	1	3	–	6	–	1
SW Louisiana	1	–	5	–	0	2	–	7	–	0
Union (TN)	0	–	5	–	1	1	–	5	–	1
Newberry	0	–	5	–	0	0	–	7	–	1
Rollins	0	–	5	–	0	0	–	5	–	0
$ – Conference champion

The 1929 Western Kentucky State Normal Hilltoppers football team represented Western Kentucky State Normal School and Teachers College (now known as Western Kentucky University) in the 1929 college football season. They were coached by Carl Anderson in his first season.

== Schedule ==
Date	Opponent	Site	Result	Source
September 28	Middle Tennessee State Teachers	Bowling Green, KY (rivalry)	W 19–0	
October 5	Ball State	Bowling Green, KY	W 13–0	
October 12	at Southwestern (TN)	Memphis, TN	L 6–12	
October 19	at Louisville	Louisville, KY	W 13–0	
October 26	Bethel (TN)	Bowling Green, KY	W 40–6	
November 2	Centre^{†}	Bowling Green, KY	L 6–7	
November 9	at Kentucky Wesleyan	Owensboro, KY	L 2–7	
November 16	Georgetown (KY)	Bowling Green, KY	W 19–0	
November 23	Evansville	Bowling Green, KY	W 44–0	
November 28	Eastern Kentucky	Bowling Green, KY (rivalry)	W 36–0	
^{†}Homecoming
