= 1929 Marshall Thundering Herd football team =

American college football season

1929 Marshall Thundering Herd football
- Conference: West Virginia Athletic Conference
- Record: 5–3–1 (4–1 WVAC)
- Head coach: John Maulbetsch (1st season)
- Captain: Tom Stark
- Home stadium: Fairfield Stadium

1929 West Virginia Athletic Conference football standings
	Conf.					Overall
Team	W		L		T	W		L		T
New River State $	5	–	0	–	0	6	–	1	–	1
West Liberty State	4	–	0	–	0	8	–	1	–	0
Glenville State	5	–	1	–	1	6	–	2	–	1
Marshall	4	–	1	–	0	5	–	3	–	1
Potomac State	4	–	1	–	0	6	–	2	–	0
West Virginia Wesleyan	4	–	1	–	0	4	–	6	–	0
Broaddus	6	–	3	–	0	6	–	4	–	0
Salem	2	–	5	–	0	2	–	6	–	0
Bethany (WV)	1	–	3	–	0	1	–	7	–	0
Morehead State	1	–	3	–	0	4	–	4	–	0
Fairmont State	1	–	4	–	0	1	–	7	–	0
Alderson	1	–	5	–	0	2	–	6	–	0
Shepherd	0	–	4	–	0	2	–	6	–	0
Morris Harvey	0	–	8	–	0	0	–	12	–	0
Davis & Elkins *	3	–	0	–	0	10	–	1	–	1
Concord *	0	–	2	–	0	1	–	6	–	0
$ – Conference champion; * – Did not qualify for conference standings Ties did not count in conference standings.

The 1929 Marshall Thundering Herd football team was an American football team that represented Marshall College (now Marshall University) in the West Virginia Athletic Conference during the 1929 college football season. The team compiled a 5–3–1 record, 4–1 against conference opponents, and outscored opponents by a total of 184 to 79.

Former Michigan star John Maulbetsch was hired as Marshall's head football coach prior to the 1929 season. He was supported by two assistant coaches, Tom Dandelet and Johnny Stuart. Tom Stark was the team captain.

== Schedule ==
Date	Opponent	Site	Result	Attendance
September 28	Glenville State	Fairfield Stadium; Huntington, WV	W 40–6	
October 5	Morris Harvey	Fairfield Stadium; Huntington, WV	W 59–6	
October 12	at Penn State*	New Beaver Field; State College, PA	L 7–26	5,000
October 19	at Bethany (WV)	Bethany, WV	W 8–0	
October 26	Louisville*	Fairfield Stadium; Huntington, WV	W 25–6	
November 2	vs. Emory and Henry*	Bluefield, WV	T 0–0	
November 9	Fairmont State	Fairfield Stadium; Huntington, WV	W 39–0	
November 16	Grove City*	Fairfield Stadium; Huntington, WV	L 6–7	
November 28	West Virginia Wesleyan^{†}	Fairfield Stadium; Huntington, WV	L 0–28	
*Non-conference game; ^{†}Homecoming
