= 1929 Spring Hill Badgers football team =

American college football season

1929 Spring Hill Badgers football
- Conference: Southern Intercollegiate Athletic Association
- Record: 7–1 (4–0 SIAA)
- Head coach: William T. Daly (5th season)

1929 Southern Intercollegiate Athletic Association football standings
| | Conf. | | | | | Overall |
| Team | W | | L | | T | W | | L | | T |
|---|---|---|---|---|---|---|---|---|---|---|
| Chattanooga $ | 7 | – | 0 | – | 0 | 8 | – | 2 | – | 0 |
| Spring Hill | 4 | – | 0 | – | 0 | 7 | – | 1 | – | 0 |
| Centre | 4 | – | 0 | – | 1 | 5 | – | 3 | – | 1 |
| The Citadel | 4 | – | 0 | – | 1 | 5 | – | 4 | – | 1 |
| Louisiana College | 3 | – | 0 | – | 1 | 6 | – | 2 | – | 1 |
| Centenary | 1 | – | 0 | – | 0 | 6 | – | 3 | – | 1 |
| Louisiana Normal | 1 | – | 0 | – | 2 | 4 | – | 3 | – | 2 |
| Furman | 4 | – | 1 | – | 1 | 5 | – | 4 | – | 1 |
| Stetson | 3 | – | 1 | – | 0 | 5 | – | 1 | – | 0 |
| Millsaps | 3 | – | 1 | – | 2 | 6 | – | 1 | – | 3 |
| Southwestern (TN) | 2 | – | 1 | – | 0 | 5 | – | 3 | – | 0 |
| Transylvania | 2 | – | 1 | – | 2 | 6 | – | 4 | – | 3 |
| Miami (FL) | 3 | – | 2 | – | 0 | 3 | – | 2 | – | 0 |
| Erskine | 3 | – | 2 | – | 0 | 6 | – | 3 | – | 0 |
| Birmingham–Southern | 4 | – | 3 | – | 0 | 4 | – | 4 | – | 0 |
| Western Kentucky State Normal | 3 | – | 3 | – | 0 | 7 | – | 3 | – | 0 |
| Howard (AL) | 3 | – | 3 | – | 2 | 5 | – | 4 | – | 2 |
| Presbyterian | 3 | – | 3 | – | 0 | 4 | – | 4 | – | 1 |
| Georgetown (KY) | 2 | – | 3 | – | 0 | 4 | – | 5 | – | 0 |
| Wofford | 2 | – | 3 | – | 0 | 3 | – | 6 | – | 0 |
| Oglethorpe | 1 | – | 2 | – | 0 | 5 | – | 4 | – | 1 |
| Kentucky Wesleyan | 1 | – | 3 | – | 0 | 5 | – | 4 | – | 0 |
| Louisiana Tech | 1 | – | 3 | – | 2 | 3 | – | 4 | – | 3 |
| Louisville | 1 | – | 3 | – | 0 | 3 | – | 5 | – | 0 |
| Southern College | 1 | – | 3 | – | 0 | 2 | – | 5 | – | 0 |
| Mercer | 2 | – | 5 | – | 0 | 2 | – | 7 | – | 0 |
| Mississippi College | 1 | – | 4 | – | 1 | 3 | – | 6 | – | 1 |
| SW Louisiana | 1 | – | 5 | – | 0 | 2 | – | 7 | – | 0 |
| Union (TN) | 0 | – | 5 | – | 1 | 1 | – | 5 | – | 1 |
| Newberry | 0 | – | 5 | – | 0 | 0 | – | 7 | – | 1 |
| Rollins | 0 | – | 5 | – | 0 | 0 | – | 5 | – | 0 |
$ – Conference champion

The 1929 Spring Hill Badgers football team was an American football team that represented Spring Hill College, a Jesuit college in Mobile, Alabama, as member of the Southern Intercollegiate Athletic Association (SIAA) during the 1929 college football season. In its fifth season under head coach William T. Daly, the team compiled an overall record of 7–1 with a mark of 4–0 in SIAA play.

== Schedule ==
| Date | Opponent | Site | Result | Source |
|---|---|---|---|---|
| September 28 | Jacksonville State* | Mobile, AL | W 18–0 | |
| October 4 | at Birmingham–Southern | Legion Field; Birmingham, AL | W 15–6 | |
| October 12 | at Southwestern Louisiana | Campus Athletic Field; Lafayette, LA | W 28–6 | |
| October 26 | Mississippi College | Mobile, AL | W 25–6 | |
| November 2 | Mississippi State Teachers* | Hartwell Field; Mobile, AL | W 25–6 | |
| November 11 | vs. Marion* | Rowell Field; Selma, AL | W 35–0 | |
| November 23 | at Loyola (LA)* | Loyola Stadium; New Orleans, LA | L 0–20 | |
| November 28 | Union (TN) | Mobile, AL | W 40–6 | |
*Non-conference game
