= McDaniel Green Terror football =

College football team

- First season: 1891; 135 years ago
- Head coach: Skyler Fultz; 2nd season, 2–18 (.100)
- Location: Westminster, Maryland
- Stadium: Kenneth R. Gill Stadium
- NCAA division: Division III
- Conference: Centennial
- Colors: Olive Green and Old Gold
- All-time record: 529–514–48 (.507)
- Bowl record: 0–2 (.000)

National championships
- Claimed: 1

Conference championships
- 12
- Consensus All-Americans: 44
- Rivalries: Maryland (1894–1942); Johns Hopkins (1947–present) (rivalry); Gettysburg College Bullets
- Website: mcdanielathletics.com

The McDaniel Green Terror football is the college football team representing McDaniel College in Westminster, Maryland in the United States. DeMarcus White has served as the team's head coach since 2019. McDaniel plays its home games at Kenneth R. Gill Stadium. The team was known as the Western Maryland Green Terror prior to 2002, when the school was renamed from Western Maryland College to its current name.

According to sportswriter Grantland Rice, the Green Terror invented the forward pass. The team also invented the shovel pass, were the first team invited to the Orange Bowl and claimed the 1929 national championship. Notable coaches and players include quarterback Eugene "Stoney" Willis, first player to throw the shovel pass; All-American and five-time All-NFL running back Bill Shepherd, and college football Hall of Fame coaches Dick Harlow and Rip Engle.

== History ==
McDaniel, formerly known as Western Maryland, football dates back to 1891 when the first game was played against northern rival Gettysburg College.

In 1908, sportswriter Grantland Rice wrote that Carl "Molly" Twigg threw the first forward pass. The invention was patented in the autumn of 1908 and perfected against Lehigh in 1910. That year the six-foot-three Marylander shocked the Engineers by hooking up with Chandler Sprague 20 times (in 21 attempts) for 350 yards handing Lehigh, fresh off a win over Princeton, a 10–0 defeat.

In the 1920s and 1930s the Green Terror were highly successful in college football, with three undefeated seasons, despite only having around 500 students. The Green Terror were nationally ranked and were commonly beating schools such as Boston College and Bucknell University. Other victories included beating University of Maryland College Park, Georgetown University, and Temple University. Many of these victories were played in front of crowds of over 20,000 at Baltimore Memorial Stadium. Such was the case in 1927 when they won the MacArthur Cup handed out by General Douglas MacArthur, when The Terror beat an all-army team made up of the best players from all the regional army bases, 48–0.

In 1929 the Green Terror was the only team to play an 11-game schedule, going undefeated, with only one true home game. After the season the Associated Press wrote in the New York Times: "Western Maryland With 11 Straight Victories Leads the List. Fourteen teams remained unbeaten at the close of the football season, Western Maryland leading the major teams with eleven straight victories, according to The Associated Press."

In 1934, during the Great Depression, Western Maryland was invited to play in the first Orange Bowl. Coach Dick Harlow declined so that his best player, Bill Shepherd, could play in the then more prestigious East–West Shrine Game, which hosted over 55,000 fans. Shepherd was the MVP of the game, playing 59 of 60 minutes as his East team lost. In the initial Orange Bowl (which only 5,000 attended) Bucknell, shut out earlier in the season by the Terror, defeated the Miami Hurricanes 26–0.

In 1947, the Green Terror football team was featured in a cartoon in The New Yorker before a game against the Harvard Crimson. Soon after World War II, McDaniel College decided to play only other small colleges described as the college's "natural rivals." That's when the McDaniel-Hopkins rivalry game started. It has been played annually as the last game of the regular season since 1947 and over 100 times since their first meeting in 1894.

In 1992, the Green Terror became the first college football team to play in Russia. Against an all-Europe team, they won 47–4. Also in 1992 Running back Eric Frees set the then NCAA Division III record for career all purpose yards.

The Green Terror returned to prominence in the late 1990s and early 2000s. They went on to be nationally ranked, with a record of 58–7, being invited to two ECAC Bowls and going to the Division III playoffs five times.

Until 2010 the Baltimore Ravens, and before that the Baltimore Colts, held their training camps at McDaniel College. Head coach John Harbaugh still hosts clinics at McDaniel. In 2011, McDaniel was ranked 6th in the country for best tailgating by The Weather Channel. This is due to fans being able to park their cars practically on the field and grill & drink during the game, a tradition that dates to the 1920s. In 2012, McDaniel College was also ranked in Southern Living Magazine as one of the top 20 of the "South's Best Tailgates." At football games McDaniel can have an average attendance over 5,000 and highs as much as 8,750 even during a losing season, ranking in the top five in the country for NCAA Division III football.
