= T. B. Amis =

American football and basketball coach (1895–1964)

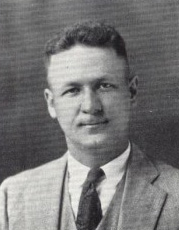
- Amis pictured in The Lasso 1926, Howard Payne yearbook

Biographical details
- Born: August 26, 1895; Newnan, Georgia, U.S.
- Died: October 14, 1964 (aged 69); Newberry, South Carolina, U.S.

Playing career

Football
- 1920–1923: Georgia Tech
- Position: Center

Coaching career (HC unless noted)

Football
- 1924–1927: Howard Payne
- 1928–1931: Furman

Basketball
- 1924–1927: Howard Payne

Administrative career (AD unless noted)
- 1928–1931: Furman

Head coaching record
- Overall: 45–25–6 (football); 32–28 (basketball)

Accomplishments and honors

Championships
- Football; 1 TIAA (1924)

Thomas Broadus "Dad" Amis (August 26, 1895 – October 14, 1964) was an American football and basketball coach. He was the third head football coach at Howard Payne University in Brownwood, Texas, serving for four seasons, from 1924 to 1927, and compiling a record of 25–12–2. Amis played college football for William Alexander's Georgia Tech Golden Tornado.

Amis was born in Newnan, Georgia. He died on October 14, 1964, at a hospital in Newberry, South Carolina, following a short illness.

== Head coaching record ==
=== Football ===
Year	Team	Overall	Conference	Standing	Bowl/playoffs
Howard Payne Yellow Jackets (Texas Intercollegiate Athletic Association) (1924–1925)
1924	Howard Payne	7–2	5–0	1st	
1925	Howard Payne	5–3–1	4–1–1	3rd	
Howard Payne Yellow Jackets (Texas Conference) (1924–1925)
1926	Howard Payne	4–4–1	3–1	2nd	
1927	Howard Payne	6–3	3–2	3rd	
Howard Payne:		24–12–2	15–4–1		
Furman Purple Hurricane (Southern Intercollegiate Athletic Association) (1928–1929)
1928	Furman	5–4	3–1	T–6th	
1929	Furman	5–4–1	4–1–1	8th	
Furman Purple Hurricane (Independent) (1930–1931)
1930	Furman	6–3–1			
1931	Furman	5–2–2			
Furman:		21–13–4	7–2–1		
Total:		45–25–6			
National championship Conference title Conference division title or championship game berth
