= 1929 Furman Purple Hurricane football team =

American college football season

1929 Furman Purple Hurricane football
- Conference: Southern Intercollegiate Athletic Association
- Record: 5–4–1 (4–1–1 SIAA)
- Head coach: T. B. Amis (2nd season)
- Captain: H. H. Smith
- Home stadium: Manly Field

1929 Southern Intercollegiate Athletic Association football standings
	Conf.					Overall
Team	W		L		T	W		L		T
Chattanooga $	7	–	0	–	0	8	–	2	–	0
Spring Hill	4	–	0	–	0	7	–	1	–	0
Centre	4	–	0	–	1	5	–	3	–	1
The Citadel	4	–	0	–	1	5	–	4	–	1
Louisiana College	3	–	0	–	1	6	–	2	–	1
Centenary	1	–	0	–	0	6	–	3	–	1
Louisiana Normal	1	–	0	–	2	4	–	3	–	2
Furman	4	–	1	–	1	5	–	4	–	1
Stetson	3	–	1	–	0	5	–	1	–	0
Millsaps	3	–	1	–	2	6	–	1	–	3
Southwestern (TN)	2	–	1	–	0	5	–	3	–	0
Transylvania	2	–	1	–	2	6	–	4	–	3
Miami (FL)	3	–	2	–	0	3	–	2	–	0
Erskine	3	–	2	–	0	6	–	3	–	0
Birmingham–Southern	4	–	3	–	0	4	–	4	–	0
Western Kentucky State Normal	3	–	3	–	0	7	–	3	–	0
Howard (AL)	3	–	3	–	2	5	–	4	–	2
Presbyterian	3	–	3	–	0	4	–	4	–	1
Georgetown (KY)	2	–	3	–	0	4	–	5	–	0
Wofford	2	–	3	–	0	3	–	6	–	0
Oglethorpe	1	–	2	–	0	5	–	4	–	1
Kentucky Wesleyan	1	–	3	–	0	5	–	4	–	0
Louisiana Tech	1	–	3	–	2	3	–	4	–	3
Louisville	1	–	3	–	0	3	–	5	–	0
Southern College	1	–	3	–	0	2	–	5	–	0
Mercer	2	–	5	–	0	2	–	7	–	0
Mississippi College	1	–	4	–	1	3	–	6	–	1
SW Louisiana	1	–	5	–	0	2	–	7	–	0
Union (TN)	0	–	5	–	1	1	–	5	–	1
Newberry	0	–	5	–	0	0	–	7	–	1
Rollins	0	–	5	–	0	0	–	5	–	0
$ – Conference champion

The 1929 Furman Purple Hurricane football team represented the Furman University as a member of the Southern Intercollegiate Athletic Association (SIAA) during the 1929 college football season. Led by second year head coach T. B. Amis, the Purple Hurricane compiled an overall record of 5–4–1, with a mark of 4–1–1 in conference play, and finished eighth in the SIAA.

== Schedule ==
Date	Opponent	Site	Result	Attendance	Source
September 21	Erskine	Manly Field; Greenville, SC	W 19–6		
September 28	at Chattanooga	Chamberlain Field; Chattanooga, TN	L 7–20	8,000	
October 5	at Georgia*	Sanford Field; Athens, GA	L 0–27		
October 11	Presbyterian	Manly Field; Greenville, SC	W 12–0		
October 19	Newberry	Manly Field; Greenville, SC	W 45–0		
October 26	at Wofford	Snyder Field; Spartanburg, SC (rivalry)	W 25–6		
November 2	Wake Forest*	Manly Field; Greenville, SC	W 12–0		
November 9	at The Citadel	Johnson Hagood Stadium; Charleston, SC (rivalry)	T 0–0	4,500	
November 16	South Carolina*	Manly Field; Greenville, SC	L 0–2		
November 28	at Clemson*	Riggs Field; Calhoun, SC	L 6–7		
*Non-conference game
