= 1929 Roanoke Maroons football team =

American college football season

1929 Roanoke Maroons football
- Conference: Virginia Conference
- Record: 2–5–2 (2–3–2 Virginia)
- Head coach: Pinky Spruhan (16th season)
- Home stadium: College Field; Maher Field

1929 Virginia Conference football standings
	Conf.					Overall
Team	W		L		T	W		L		T
William & Mary $	5	–	0	–	0	8	–	2	–	0
Hampden–Sydney	4	–	1	–	0	4	–	5	–	0
Emory and Henry	3	–	1	–	0	7	–	2	–	1
Roanoke	2	–	3	–	2	2	–	5	–	2
Richmond	2	–	3	–	1	3	–	5	–	1
Randolph–Macon	2	–	3	–	0	2	–	5	–	0
Lynchburg	1	–	3	–	1	1	–	6	–	1
Bridgewater	0	–	5	–	0	0	–	7	–	0
$ – Conference champion

The 1929 Roanoke Maroons football team represented Roanoke College as a member of the Virginia Conference during the 1929 college football season. Led by 16th-year head coach Pinky Spruhan, the Maroons compiled an overall record of 2–5–2, with a mark of 2–3–2 in conference play, and finished fourth in the Virginia Conference.

== Schedule ==
Date	Opponent	Site	Result	Attendance	Source
September 28	at VPI*	Miles Stadium; Blacksburg, VA	L 0–19		
October 4	Bridgewater	College Field; Salem, VA	W 31–0		
October 12	at Albright*	Reading, PA	L 0–46		
October 19	Emory and Henry	College Field; Salem, VA	L 0–26		
October 26	at Hampden–Sydney	Hampden-Sydney, VA	L 7–13		
November 2	at Richmond	City Stadium; Richmond, VA	T 6–6		
November 11	William & Mary	Maher Field; Roanoke, VA	L 6–19	2,000–2,500	
November 15	Randolph–Macon	College Field; Salem, VA	W 7–0		
November 22	at Lynchburg	Municipal Stadium; Lynchburg, VA	T 6–6		
*Non-conference game
