= 1929 Mississippi College Choctaws football team =

American college football season

1929 Mississippi College Choctaws football
- Conference: Southern Intercollegiate Athletic Association
- Record: 3–6–1 (1–4–1 SIAA)
- Head coach: Stanley L. Robinson (5th season)
- Home stadium: Provine Field; Municipal Stadium

1929 Southern Intercollegiate Athletic Association football standings
	Conf.					Overall
Team	W		L		T	W		L		T
Chattanooga $	7	–	0	–	0	8	–	2	–	0
Spring Hill	4	–	0	–	0	7	–	1	–	0
Centre	4	–	0	–	1	5	–	3	–	1
The Citadel	4	–	0	–	1	5	–	4	–	1
Louisiana College	3	–	0	–	1	6	–	2	–	1
Centenary	1	–	0	–	0	6	–	3	–	1
Louisiana Normal	1	–	0	–	2	4	–	3	–	2
Furman	4	–	1	–	1	5	–	4	–	1
Stetson	3	–	1	–	0	5	–	1	–	0
Millsaps	3	–	1	–	2	6	–	1	–	3
Southwestern (TN)	2	–	1	–	0	5	–	3	–	0
Transylvania	2	–	1	–	2	6	–	4	–	3
Miami (FL)	3	–	2	–	0	3	–	2	–	0
Erskine	3	–	2	–	0	6	–	3	–	0
Birmingham–Southern	4	–	3	–	0	4	–	4	–	0
Western Kentucky State Normal	3	–	3	–	0	7	–	3	–	0
Howard (AL)	3	–	3	–	2	5	–	4	–	2
Presbyterian	3	–	3	–	0	4	–	4	–	1
Georgetown (KY)	2	–	3	–	0	4	–	5	–	0
Wofford	2	–	3	–	0	3	–	6	–	0
Oglethorpe	1	–	2	–	0	5	–	4	–	1
Kentucky Wesleyan	1	–	3	–	0	5	–	4	–	0
Louisiana Tech	1	–	3	–	2	3	–	4	–	3
Louisville	1	–	3	–	0	3	–	5	–	0
Southern College	1	–	3	–	0	2	–	5	–	0
Mercer	2	–	5	–	0	2	–	7	–	0
Mississippi College	1	–	4	–	1	3	–	6	–	1
SW Louisiana	1	–	5	–	0	2	–	7	–	0
Union (TN)	0	–	5	–	1	1	–	5	–	1
Newberry	0	–	5	–	0	0	–	7	–	1
Rollins	0	–	5	–	0	0	–	5	–	0
$ – Conference champion

The 1929 Mississippi College Choctaws football team was an American football team that represented Mississippi College as a member of the Southern Intercollegiate Athletic Association (SIAA) during the 1929 college football season. In their fifth year under head coach Stanley L. Robinson, the team compiled a 3–6–1 record.

== Schedule ==
Date	Opponent	Site	Result	Attendance	Source
September 28	at Alabama*	Denny Stadium; Tuscaloosa, AL	L 0–55	6,000	
October 5	Mississippi State Teachers*	Provine Field; Clinton, MS	W 20–0		
October 11	Howard (AL)	Provine Field; Clinton, MS	T 0–0		
October 18	at Millsaps	Municipal Stadium; Jackson, MS (rivalry)	L 0–7		
October 26	at Spring Hill	Mobile, AL	L 6–25		
November 2	at Mississippi A&M*	Scott Field; Starkville, MS	L 0–6		
November 9	at Birmingham–Southern	Legion Field; Birmingham, AL	L 0–20		
November 15	Louisiana Tech	Municipal Stadium; Jackson, MS	W 21–6	<1,000	
November 20	at UNAM*	(Mexico) Estadio Val Buena; Mexico City, MX	W 28–0	75,000	
November 28	at Southwestern (TN)	Memphis, TN	L 7–20		
*Non-conference game
