= 1929 The Citadel Bulldogs football team =

American college football season

1929 The Citadel Bulldogs football
- Conference: Southern Intercollegiate Athletic Association
- Record: 5–4–1 (4–0–1 SIAA)
- Head coach: Carl Prause (8th season)
- Home stadium: Johnson Hagood Stadium

1929 Southern Intercollegiate Athletic Association football standings
	Conf.					Overall
Team	W		L		T	W		L		T
Chattanooga $	7	–	0	–	0	8	–	2	–	0
Spring Hill	4	–	0	–	0	7	–	1	–	0
Centre	4	–	0	–	1	5	–	3	–	1
The Citadel	4	–	0	–	1	5	–	4	–	1
Louisiana College	3	–	0	–	1	6	–	2	–	1
Centenary	1	–	0	–	0	6	–	3	–	1
Louisiana Normal	1	–	0	–	2	4	–	3	–	2
Furman	4	–	1	–	1	5	–	4	–	1
Stetson	3	–	1	–	0	5	–	1	–	0
Millsaps	3	–	1	–	2	6	–	1	–	3
Southwestern (TN)	2	–	1	–	0	5	–	3	–	0
Transylvania	2	–	1	–	2	6	–	4	–	3
Miami (FL)	3	–	2	–	0	3	–	2	–	0
Erskine	3	–	2	–	0	6	–	3	–	0
Birmingham–Southern	4	–	3	–	0	4	–	4	–	0
Western Kentucky State Normal	3	–	3	–	0	7	–	3	–	0
Howard (AL)	3	–	3	–	2	5	–	4	–	2
Presbyterian	3	–	3	–	0	4	–	4	–	1
Georgetown (KY)	2	–	3	–	0	4	–	5	–	0
Wofford	2	–	3	–	0	3	–	6	–	0
Oglethorpe	1	–	2	–	0	5	–	4	–	1
Kentucky Wesleyan	1	–	3	–	0	5	–	4	–	0
Louisiana Tech	1	–	3	–	2	3	–	4	–	3
Louisville	1	–	3	–	0	3	–	5	–	0
Southern College	1	–	3	–	0	2	–	5	–	0
Mercer	2	–	5	–	0	2	–	7	–	0
Mississippi College	1	–	4	–	1	3	–	6	–	1
SW Louisiana	1	–	5	–	0	2	–	7	–	0
Union (TN)	0	–	5	–	1	1	–	5	–	1
Newberry	0	–	5	–	0	0	–	7	–	1
Rollins	0	–	5	–	0	0	–	5	–	0
$ – Conference champion

The 1929 The Citadel Bulldogs football team represented The Citadel, The Military College of South Carolina as member of the Southern Intercollegiate Athletic Association (SIAA) in the 1929 college football season. Carl Prause served as head coach for the eighth season. The Bulldogs played home games at Johnson Hagood Stadium.

== Schedule ==
Date	Opponent	Site	Result	Source
September 28	Newberry*	Johnson Hagood Stadium; Charleston, SC	W 59–0	
October 5	Oglethorpe	Johnson Hagood Stadium; Charleston, SC	W 18–0	
October 12	at VMI*	Alumni Field; Lexington, VA (rivalry)	L 7–13	
October 19	at Davidson*	Richardson Field; Davidson, NC	L 6–7	
October 26	Presbyterian	Johnson Hagood Stadium; Charleston, SC	W 14–0	
October 31	vs. South Carolina*	County Fairgrounds; Orangeburg, SC	L 14–27	
November 9	Furman	Johnson Hagood Stadium; Charleston, SC (rivalry)	T 0–0	
November 16	Mercer	Johnson Hagood Stadium; Charleston, SC	W 21–13	
November 23	at Clemson*	Riggs Field; Calhoun, SC	L 0–13	
November 28	Wofford	Johnson Hagood Stadium; Charleston, SC (rivalry)	W 7–0	
*Non-conference game
