= 1929 Louisiana Tech Bulldogs football team =

American college football season

1929 Louisiana Tech Bulldogs football
- Conference: Southern Intercollegiate Athletic Association
- Record: 3–4–3 (1–3–2 SIAA)
- Head coach: Tod Rockwell (2nd season)
- Captain: Gale Burham
- Home stadium: Tech Field

1929 Southern Intercollegiate Athletic Association football standings
| | Conf. | | | | | Overall |
| Team | W | | L | | T | W | | L | | T |
|---|---|---|---|---|---|---|---|---|---|---|
| Chattanooga $ | 7 | – | 0 | – | 0 | 8 | – | 2 | – | 0 |
| Spring Hill | 4 | – | 0 | – | 0 | 7 | – | 1 | – | 0 |
| Centre | 4 | – | 0 | – | 1 | 5 | – | 3 | – | 1 |
| The Citadel | 4 | – | 0 | – | 1 | 5 | – | 4 | – | 1 |
| Louisiana College | 3 | – | 0 | – | 1 | 6 | – | 2 | – | 1 |
| Centenary | 1 | – | 0 | – | 0 | 6 | – | 3 | – | 1 |
| Louisiana Normal | 1 | – | 0 | – | 2 | 4 | – | 3 | – | 2 |
| Furman | 4 | – | 1 | – | 1 | 5 | – | 4 | – | 1 |
| Stetson | 3 | – | 1 | – | 0 | 5 | – | 1 | – | 0 |
| Millsaps | 3 | – | 1 | – | 2 | 6 | – | 1 | – | 3 |
| Southwestern (TN) | 2 | – | 1 | – | 0 | 5 | – | 3 | – | 0 |
| Transylvania | 2 | – | 1 | – | 2 | 6 | – | 4 | – | 3 |
| Miami (FL) | 3 | – | 2 | – | 0 | 3 | – | 2 | – | 0 |
| Erskine | 3 | – | 2 | – | 0 | 6 | – | 3 | – | 0 |
| Birmingham–Southern | 4 | – | 3 | – | 0 | 4 | – | 4 | – | 0 |
| Western Kentucky State Normal | 3 | – | 3 | – | 0 | 7 | – | 3 | – | 0 |
| Howard (AL) | 3 | – | 3 | – | 2 | 5 | – | 4 | – | 2 |
| Presbyterian | 3 | – | 3 | – | 0 | 4 | – | 4 | – | 1 |
| Georgetown (KY) | 2 | – | 3 | – | 0 | 4 | – | 5 | – | 0 |
| Wofford | 2 | – | 3 | – | 0 | 3 | – | 6 | – | 0 |
| Oglethorpe | 1 | – | 2 | – | 0 | 5 | – | 4 | – | 1 |
| Kentucky Wesleyan | 1 | – | 3 | – | 0 | 5 | – | 4 | – | 0 |
| Louisiana Tech | 1 | – | 3 | – | 2 | 3 | – | 4 | – | 3 |
| Louisville | 1 | – | 3 | – | 0 | 3 | – | 5 | – | 0 |
| Southern College | 1 | – | 3 | – | 0 | 2 | – | 5 | – | 0 |
| Mercer | 2 | – | 5 | – | 0 | 2 | – | 7 | – | 0 |
| Mississippi College | 1 | – | 4 | – | 1 | 3 | – | 6 | – | 1 |
| SW Louisiana | 1 | – | 5 | – | 0 | 2 | – | 7 | – | 0 |
| Union (TN) | 0 | – | 5 | – | 1 | 1 | – | 5 | – | 1 |
| Newberry | 0 | – | 5 | – | 0 | 0 | – | 7 | – | 1 |
| Rollins | 0 | – | 5 | – | 0 | 0 | – | 5 | – | 0 |
$ – Conference champion

The 1929 Louisiana Tech Bulldogs football team was an American football team that represented the Louisiana Polytechnic Institute—now known as Louisiana Tech University—as a member of the Southern Intercollegiate Athletic Association (SIAA) during the 1929 college football season. Led Tod Rockwell in his second and final year as head coach, Louisiana Tech compiled an overall record of 3–4–3. The team's captain was Gale Burham.

== Schedule ==
| Date | Opponent | Site | Result | Attendance | Source |
|---|---|---|---|---|---|
| October 5 | Clarke College (MS)* | Ruston, LA | W 19–12 | | |
| October 11 | at Magnolia A&M* | Magnolia, AR | T 6–6 | | |
| October 19 | vs. Ouachita Baptist* | Rowland Field; El Dorado, AR | W 13–0 | 3,000 | |
| October 25 | at LSU* | Tiger Stadium; Baton Rouge, LA | L 7–53 | | |
| November 1 | Louisiana Normal | Ruston, LA (rivalry) | T 0–0 | | |
| November 8 | at Millsaps | Jackson, MS | T 6–6 | | |
| November 15 | at Mississippi College | Municipal Stadium; Jackson, MS | L 6–21 | <1,000 | |
| November 23 | at Centenary | State Fair Stadium; Shreveport, LA | L 0–19 | | |
| November 30 | at Louisiana College | Pineville, LA | L 13–19 | | |
| December 7 | Southwestern Louisiana^{†} | Ruston, LA (rivalry) | W 24–7 | 1,000 | |
*Non-conference game; ^{†}Homecoming
