= 1929 Oglethorpe Stormy Petrels football team =

American college football season

1929 Oglethorpe Stormy Petrels football
- Conference: Southern Intercollegiate Athletic Association
- Record: 5–4–1 (1–2 SIAA)
- Head coach: Harry J. Robertson (5th season)

1929 Southern Intercollegiate Athletic Association football standings
	Conf.					Overall
Team	W		L		T	W		L		T
Chattanooga $	7	–	0	–	0	8	–	2	–	0
Spring Hill	4	–	0	–	0	7	–	1	–	0
Centre	4	–	0	–	1	5	–	3	–	1
The Citadel	4	–	0	–	1	5	–	4	–	1
Louisiana College	3	–	0	–	1	6	–	2	–	1
Centenary	1	–	0	–	0	6	–	3	–	1
Louisiana Normal	1	–	0	–	2	4	–	3	–	2
Furman	4	–	1	–	1	5	–	4	–	1
Stetson	3	–	1	–	0	5	–	1	–	0
Millsaps	3	–	1	–	2	6	–	1	–	3
Southwestern (TN)	2	–	1	–	0	5	–	3	–	0
Transylvania	2	–	1	–	2	6	–	4	–	3
Miami (FL)	3	–	2	–	0	3	–	2	–	0
Erskine	3	–	2	–	0	6	–	3	–	0
Birmingham–Southern	4	–	3	–	0	4	–	4	–	0
Western Kentucky State Normal	3	–	3	–	0	7	–	3	–	0
Howard (AL)	3	–	3	–	2	5	–	4	–	2
Presbyterian	3	–	3	–	0	4	–	4	–	1
Georgetown (KY)	2	–	3	–	0	4	–	5	–	0
Wofford	2	–	3	–	0	3	–	6	–	0
Oglethorpe	1	–	2	–	0	5	–	4	–	1
Kentucky Wesleyan	1	–	3	–	0	5	–	4	–	0
Louisiana Tech	1	–	3	–	2	3	–	4	–	3
Louisville	1	–	3	–	0	3	–	5	–	0
Southern College	1	–	3	–	0	2	–	5	–	0
Mercer	2	–	5	–	0	2	–	7	–	0
Mississippi College	1	–	4	–	1	3	–	6	–	1
SW Louisiana	1	–	5	–	0	2	–	7	–	0
Union (TN)	0	–	5	–	1	1	–	5	–	1
Newberry	0	–	5	–	0	0	–	7	–	1
Rollins	0	–	5	–	0	0	–	5	–	0
$ – Conference champion

The 1929 Oglethorpe Stormy Petrels football team represented Oglethorpe University as member of the Southern Intercollegiate Athletic Association (SIAA) during the 1929 college football season. The highlight of the season was the victory over Georgia.

== Schedule ==
Date	Opponent	Site	Result	Attendance	Source
September 28	at Georgia*	Sanford Field; Athens, GA	W 13–6		
October 5	at The Citadel	Johnson Hagood Stadium; Charleston, SC	L 0–18		
October 11	at Loyola (LA)*	Loyola University Stadium; New Orleans, LA	T 0–0	10,000	
October 19	at Saint Louis*	Sportsman's Park; St. Louis, MO	L 0–6	8,000	
October 26	Dayton*	Hermance Stadium; Atlanta, GA	W 20–12		
November 2	at Villanova*	Villanova Stadium; Villanova, PA	L 7–17	10,000	
November 9	Manhattan*	Hermance Stadium; Atlanta, GA	W 14–3		
November 16	Xavier*	Corcoran Field; Cincinnati, OH	W 7–0	5,500	
November 23	Mercer	Hermance Stadium; Atlanta, GA	W 26–0		
November 28	Chattanooga	Chamberlain Field; Chattanooga, TN	L 6–16		
*Non-conference game
