= 1929 Western Maryland Green Terror football team =

American college football season

1929 Western Maryland Green Terror football
- Conference: Independent
- Record: 11–0
- Head coach: Dick Harlow (4th season)
- Offensive scheme: Single-wing
- Captain: Charlie Havens

1929 Southern college football independents records
	Conf.			Overall
Team	W	L	T	W		L		T
Western Maryland		–		11	–	0	–	0
Delaware State		–		1	–	0	–	0
Guilford		–		7	–	1	–	1
Texas Mines		–		6	–	1	–	2
Appalachian State		–		4	–	1	–	3
Navy		–		6	–	2	–	2
Georgetown		–		5	–	2	–	2
South Georgia Teachers		–		5	–	2	–	2
Middle Tennessee State Teachers		–		6	–	3	–	1
Beacom College		–		3	–	2	–	0
Wake Forest		–		6	–	5	–	1
Catholic University		–		5	–	4	–	0
West Virginia		–		4	–	3	–	3
Loyola (LA)		–		4	–	4	–	2
Davidson		–		5	–	5	–	0
Texas A&I		–		3	–	4	–	1
East Tennessee State Teachers		–		2	–	5	–	1
Mississippi State Teachers		–		2	–	6	–	1
Texas Tech		–		1	–	7	–	2
Delaware		–		0	–	7	–	1
George Washington		–		0	–	8	–	0

The 1929 Western Maryland Green Terror football team was an American football team that represented Western Maryland College (now known as McDaniel College) as an independent during the 1929 college football season. In its fourth season under head coach Dick Harlow, the team compiled a perfect 11–0 record and shut out eight of its eleven opponents. Charlie Havens was the team's captain. Western Maryland played home games at Hoffa Field on Westminster, Maryland.

The 1929 season preceded the era of the AP poll, but Western Maryland was the only undefeated team to play an 11-game schedule. After the season the Associated Press wrote: "Western Maryland With 11 Straight Victories Leads the List. Fourteen teams remained unbeaten at the close of the football season, Western Maryland leading the major teams with eleven straight victories, according to The Associated Press."

Key players included Stoney Willis, Rip Engle, Havens, and Paul L. Bates. Western Maryland's 1929 season was part of a 27-game undefeated streak that started in 1928 and continued into 1931. Harlow was later inducted into the College Football Hall of Fame.

== Schedule ==
Date	Opponent	Site	Result	Attendance	Source
September 28	Baltimore	Westminster, MD	W 34–0		
October 5	at Georgetown	Georgetown Field; Washington, DC	W 7–0		
October 12	at St. Thomas (PA)	Scranton, PA	W 12–6		
October 19	vs. Temple	Baltimore Stadium; Baltimore, MD	W 23–0	10,000	
October 26	at Albright	Albright Stadium; Reading, PA	W 21–6		
November 2	vs. St. John's (MD)	Baltimore Stadium; Baltimore, MD	W 20–0		
November 11	vs. Loyola (MD)	Baltimore Stadium; Baltimore, MD	W 33–7		
November 16	at Mount St. Mary's	Echo Field; Emmitsburg, MD	W 6–0		
November 23	vs. Saint Francis (PA)	Altoona, PA	W 7–0		
November 28	at Muhlenberg	Muhlenberg Field; Allentown, PA	W 7–0		
December 7	vs. Maryland	Baltimore Stadium; Baltimore, MD	W 12–0	25,000	
