= 1929 Chattanooga Moccasins football team =

American college football season

1929 Chattanooga Moccasins football

SIAA champion
- Conference: Southern Intercollegiate Athletic Association
- Record: 8–2 (7–0 SIAA)
- Head coach: Harold Drew (1st season)
- Captain: Humpy Heywood
- Home stadium: Chamberlain Field

1929 Southern Intercollegiate Athletic Association football standings
	Conf.					Overall
Team	W		L		T	W		L		T
Chattanooga $	7	–	0	–	0	8	–	2	–	0
Spring Hill	4	–	0	–	0	7	–	1	–	0
Centre	4	–	0	–	1	5	–	3	–	1
The Citadel	4	–	0	–	1	5	–	4	–	1
Louisiana College	3	–	0	–	1	6	–	2	–	1
Centenary	1	–	0	–	0	6	–	3	–	1
Louisiana Normal	1	–	0	–	2	4	–	3	–	2
Furman	4	–	1	–	1	5	–	4	–	1
Stetson	3	–	1	–	0	5	–	1	–	0
Millsaps	3	–	1	–	2	6	–	1	–	3
Southwestern (TN)	2	–	1	–	0	5	–	3	–	0
Transylvania	2	–	1	–	2	6	–	4	–	3
Miami (FL)	3	–	2	–	0	3	–	2	–	0
Erskine	3	–	2	–	0	6	–	3	–	0
Birmingham–Southern	4	–	3	–	0	4	–	4	–	0
Western Kentucky State Normal	3	–	3	–	0	7	–	3	–	0
Howard (AL)	3	–	3	–	2	5	–	4	–	2
Presbyterian	3	–	3	–	0	4	–	4	–	1
Georgetown (KY)	2	–	3	–	0	4	–	5	–	0
Wofford	2	–	3	–	0	3	–	6	–	0
Oglethorpe	1	–	2	–	0	5	–	4	–	1
Kentucky Wesleyan	1	–	3	–	0	5	–	4	–	0
Louisiana Tech	1	–	3	–	2	3	–	4	–	3
Louisville	1	–	3	–	0	3	–	5	–	0
Southern College	1	–	3	–	0	2	–	5	–	0
Mercer	2	–	5	–	0	2	–	7	–	0
Mississippi College	1	–	4	–	1	3	–	6	–	1
SW Louisiana	1	–	5	–	0	2	–	7	–	0
Union (TN)	0	–	5	–	1	1	–	5	–	1
Newberry	0	–	5	–	0	0	–	7	–	1
Rollins	0	–	5	–	0	0	–	5	–	0
$ – Conference champion

The 1929 Chattanooga Moccasins football team represented the University of Chattanooga as a member of the Southern Intercollegiate Athletic Association (SIAA) during the 1929 college football season. First-year head coach Harold Drew led the team to the SIAA championship.

== Schedule ==
Date	Opponent	Site	Result	Attendance	Source
September 21	Middle Tennessee State Teachers*	Chamberlain Field; Chattanooga, TN	W 40–0	4,000	
September 28	at Furman	Chamberlain Field; Chattanooga, TN	W 20–7	8,000	
October 5	Tennessee*	Chamberlain Field; Chattanooga, TN	L 0–20	10,000	
October 12	at Alabama*	Denny Stadium; Tuscaloosa, AL	L 0–46	5,000	
October 19	Birmingham–Southern	Chamberlain Field; Chattanooga, TN	W 13–7		
October 26	at Mercer	Centennial Stadium; Macon, GA	W 7–0		
November 2	Rollins	Chamberlain Field; Chattanooga, TN	W 1–0 (Rollins forfeit)		
November 9	Howard (AL)	Chamberlain Field; Chattanooga, TN	W 20–14		
November 16	Union (TN)	Chamberlain Field; Chattanooga, TN	W 48–0		
November 28	Oglethorpe	Chamberlain Field; Chattanooga, TN	W 16–6		
*Non-conference game
