= 1929 Wake Forest Demon Deacons football team =

American college football season

1929 Wake Forest Demon Deacons football
- Conference: Independent
- Record: 6–5–1
- Head coach: Pat Miller (1st season)
- Home stadium: Gore Field

1929 Southern college football independents records
| | Conf. | | | Overall |
| Team | W | L | T | W | | L | | T |
|---|---|---|---|---|---|---|---|---|
| Western Maryland | | – | | 11 | – | 0 | – | 0 |
| Delaware State | | – | | 1 | – | 0 | – | 0 |
| Guilford | | – | | 7 | – | 1 | – | 1 |
| Texas Mines | | – | | 6 | – | 1 | – | 2 |
| Appalachian State | | – | | 4 | – | 1 | – | 3 |
| Navy | | – | | 6 | – | 2 | – | 2 |
| Georgetown | | – | | 5 | – | 2 | – | 2 |
| South Georgia Teachers | | – | | 5 | – | 2 | – | 2 |
| Middle Tennessee State Teachers | | – | | 6 | – | 3 | – | 1 |
| Beacom College | | – | | 3 | – | 2 | – | 0 |
| Wake Forest | | – | | 6 | – | 5 | – | 1 |
| Catholic University | | – | | 5 | – | 4 | – | 0 |
| West Virginia | | – | | 4 | – | 3 | – | 3 |
| Loyola (LA) | | – | | 4 | – | 4 | – | 2 |
| Davidson | | – | | 5 | – | 5 | – | 0 |
| Texas A&I | | – | | 3 | – | 4 | – | 1 |
| East Tennessee State Teachers | | – | | 2 | – | 5 | – | 1 |
| Mississippi State Teachers | | – | | 2 | – | 6 | – | 1 |
| Texas Tech | | – | | 1 | – | 7 | – | 2 |
| Delaware | | – | | 0 | – | 7 | – | 1 |
| George Washington | | – | | 0 | – | 8 | – | 0 |

The 1929 Wake Forest Demon Deacons football team was an American football team that represented Wake Forest College (now known as Wake Forest University) during the 1929 college football season. In its first season under head coach Pat Miller, the team compiled a 6–5–1 record.

== Schedule ==
| Date | Time | Opponent | Site | Result | Attendance | Source |
|---|---|---|---|---|---|---|
| September 21 | | Catawba | Gore Field; Wake Forest, NC | W 20–0 | | |
| September 28 | | at North Carolina | Kenan Memorial Stadium; Chapel Hill, NC (rivalry) | L 0–48 | 10,000 | |
| October 5 | 2:30 p.m. | at Richmond | City Stadium; Richmond, VA | W 19–0 | 6,000 | |
| October 11 | | Elon | Gore Field; Wake Forest, NC | W 25–6 | | |
| October 17 | | at NC State | Riddick Stadium; Raleigh, NC (rivalry) | L 6–8 | | |
| October 26 | | vs. Davidson | World War Memorial Stadium; Greensboro, NC | W 6–0 | 5,000 | |
| November 2 | | at Furman | Manly Field; Greenville, SC | L 0–12 | 3,000 | |
| November 9 | | at Wofford | Snyder Field; Spartanburg, SC | W 18–0 | | |
| November 16 | | at Navy | Thompson Stadium; Annapolis, MD | L 0–61 | | |
| November 19 | 2:30 p.m. | Presbyterian | Gore Field; Wake Forest, NC | T 0–0 | | |
| November 23 | | at Duke | Duke Stadium; Durham, NC (rivalry) | L 0–20 | 750 | |
| November 28 | 3:00 p.m. | vs. Mercer | Memorial Stadium; Asheville, NC | W 13–0 | | |
All times are in Eastern time
