= 1929 Loyola Wolf Pack football team =

American college football season

1929 Loyola Wolf Pack football
- Conference: Independent
- Record: 4–4–2
- Head coach: Clark Shaughnessy (3rd season)
- Home stadium: Loyola University Stadium

1929 Southern college football independents records
	Conf.			Overall
Team	W	L	T	W		L		T
Western Maryland		–		11	–	0	–	0
Delaware State		–		1	–	0	–	0
Guilford		–		7	–	1	–	1
Texas Mines		–		6	–	1	–	2
Appalachian State		–		4	–	1	–	3
Navy		–		6	–	2	–	2
Georgetown		–		5	–	2	–	2
South Georgia Teachers		–		5	–	2	–	2
Middle Tennessee State Teachers		–		6	–	3	–	1
Beacom College		–		3	–	2	–	0
Wake Forest		–		6	–	5	–	1
Catholic University		–		5	–	4	–	0
West Virginia		–		4	–	3	–	3
Loyola (LA)		–		4	–	4	–	2
Davidson		–		5	–	5	–	0
Texas A&I		–		3	–	4	–	1
East Tennessee State Teachers		–		2	–	5	–	1
Mississippi State Teachers		–		2	–	6	–	1
Texas Tech		–		1	–	7	–	2
Delaware		–		0	–	7	–	1
George Washington		–		0	–	8	–	0

The 1929 Loyola Wolf Pack football team was the American football team that represented Loyola College of New Orleans (now known as Loyola University New Orleans) as an independent during the 1929 college football season. In its third season, under head coach Clark Shaughnessy, the team compiled a 4–4–2 record and outscored opponents by a total of 150 to 129. The team played its home games at Loyola University Stadium in New Orleans.

== Schedule ==
Date	Opponent	Site	Result	Attendance	Source
September 21	St. Edward's (TX)	Loyola Stadium; New Orleans, LA	W 18–0		
September 27	Rice	Loyola Stadium; New Orleans, LA	W 33–0		
October 12	Oglethorpe	Loyola Stadium; New Orleans, LA	T 0–0	10,000	
October 18	Ole Miss	Loyola Stadium; New Orleans, LA	L 24–26		
October 26	at Detroit	University of Detroit Stadium; Detroit, MI	L 6–20	> 18,000	
November 2	Haskell	Loyola Stadium; New Orleans, LA	W 19–12		
November 11	Loyola (IL)	Loyola Stadium; New Orleans, LA	T 6–6	8,000	
November 23	Spring Hill	Loyola Stadium; New Orleans, LA	W 20–0		
November 28	at Butler	Butler Bowl; Indianapolis, IN	L 13–33		
December 7	Centenary	Loyola Stadium; New Orleans, LA	L 0–6	3,000	
