= 1929 Mississippi State Teachers Yellow Jackets football team =

American college football season

1929 Mississippi State Teachers Yellow Jackets football
- Conference: Independent
- Record: 2–6–1
- Head coach: William B. Saunders (2nd season)
- Home stadium: Kamper Park

1929 Southern college football independents records
	Conf.			Overall
Team	W	L	T	W		L		T
Western Maryland		–		11	–	0	–	0
Delaware State		–		1	–	0	–	0
Guilford		–		7	–	1	–	1
Texas Mines		–		6	–	1	–	2
Appalachian State		–		4	–	1	–	3
Navy		–		6	–	2	–	2
Georgetown		–		5	–	2	–	2
South Georgia Teachers		–		5	–	2	–	2
Middle Tennessee State Teachers		–		6	–	3	–	1
Beacom College		–		3	–	2	–	0
Wake Forest		–		6	–	5	–	1
Catholic University		–		5	–	4	–	0
West Virginia		–		4	–	3	–	3
Loyola (LA)		–		4	–	4	–	2
Davidson		–		5	–	5	–	0
Texas A&I		–		3	–	4	–	1
East Tennessee State Teachers		–		2	–	5	–	1
Mississippi State Teachers		–		2	–	6	–	1
Texas Tech		–		1	–	7	–	2
Delaware		–		0	–	7	–	1
George Washington		–		0	–	8	–	0

The 1929 Mississippi State Teachers Yellow Jackets football team was an American football team that represented the Mississippi State Teachers College (now known as the University of Southern Mississippi) as an independent during the 1929 college football season. In their second year under head coach William B. Saunders, the team compiled a 2–6–1 record.

== Schedule ==
Date	Opponent	Site	Result	Source
September 28	at Southwestern Louisiana	S.L.I. Stadium; Lafayette, LA	L 0–7	
October 5	at Mississippi College	Provine Field; Clinton, MS	L 0–20	
October 12	Marion	Kamper Park; Hattiesburg, MS	W 31–0	
October 18	Southwest Mississippi	Kamper Park; Hattiesburg, MS	T 6–6	
November 2	at Spring Hill	Hartwell Field; Mobile, AL	L 6–25	
November 9	Pearl River	Kamper Park; Hattiesburg, MS	L 7–14	
November 16	at Louisiana College	Alumni Field; Pineville, LA	L 6–12	
November 22	at Delta State	Cleveland, MS	L 6–14	
November 29	Clarke College (MS)	Kamper Park; Hattiesburg, MS	W 12–7	
