= 1929 Davidson Wildcats football team =

American college football season

1929 Davidson Wildcats football
- Conference: Independent
- Record: 5–5
- Head coach: William L. Younger (7th season)
- Home stadium: Richardson Field

1929 Southern college football independents records
	Conf.			Overall
Team	W	L	T	W		L		T
Western Maryland		–		11	–	0	–	0
Delaware State		–		1	–	0	–	0
Guilford		–		7	–	1	–	1
Texas Mines		–		6	–	1	–	2
Appalachian State		–		4	–	1	–	3
Navy		–		6	–	2	–	2
Georgetown		–		5	–	2	–	2
South Georgia Teachers		–		5	–	2	–	2
Middle Tennessee State Teachers		–		6	–	3	–	1
Beacom College		–		3	–	2	–	0
Wake Forest		–		6	–	5	–	1
Catholic University		–		5	–	4	–	0
West Virginia		–		4	–	3	–	3
Loyola (LA)		–		4	–	4	–	2
Davidson		–		5	–	5	–	0
Texas A&I		–		3	–	4	–	1
East Tennessee State Teachers		–		2	–	5	–	1
Mississippi State Teachers		–		2	–	6	–	1
Texas Tech		–		1	–	7	–	2
Delaware		–		0	–	7	–	1
George Washington		–		0	–	8	–	0

The 1929 Davidson Wildcats football team was an American football team that represented Davidson College as an independent during the 1929 college football season. In their seventh year under head coach William L. Younger, the team compiled a 5–5 record.

== Schedule ==
Date	Opponent	Site	Result	Attendance	Source
September 21	Elon	Richardson Field; Davidson, NC	W 20–6		
September 28	vs. Clemson	Central High School Stadium; Charlotte, NC	L 14–32	8,000	
October 5	at Wofford	Spartanburg, SC	W 7–0		
October 12	at Army	Michie Stadium; West Point, NY	L 7–23		
October 19	The Citadel	Richardson Field; Davidson, NC	W 7–6		
October 26	vs. Wake Forest	World War Memorial Stadium; Greensboro, NC	L 0–6	5,000	
November 2	VMI	Richardson Field; Davidson, NC	L 6–12		
November 9	at NC State	Riddick Stadium; Raleigh, NC	W 13–0		
November 16	North Carolina	Richardson Field; Davidson, NC	L 6–26	7,000	
November 28	Duke	Richardson Field; Davidson, NC	W 13–12		
