= 1929 Catholic University Cardinals football team =

American college football season

1929 Catholic University Cardinals football
- Conference: Independent
- Record: 5–4
- Head coach: John B. McAuliffe (5th season)
- Home stadium: Brookland Stadium

1929 Southern college football independents records
	Conf.			Overall
Team	W	L	T	W		L		T
Western Maryland		–		11	–	0	–	0
Delaware State		–		1	–	0	–	0
Guilford		–		7	–	1	–	1
Texas Mines		–		6	–	1	–	2
Appalachian State		–		4	–	1	–	3
Navy		–		6	–	2	–	2
Georgetown		–		5	–	2	–	2
South Georgia Teachers		–		5	–	2	–	2
Middle Tennessee State Teachers		–		6	–	3	–	1
Beacom College		–		3	–	2	–	0
Wake Forest		–		6	–	5	–	1
Catholic University		–		5	–	4	–	0
West Virginia		–		4	–	3	–	3
Loyola (LA)		–		4	–	4	–	2
Davidson		–		5	–	5	–	0
Texas A&I		–		3	–	4	–	1
East Tennessee State Teachers		–		2	–	5	–	1
Mississippi State Teachers		–		2	–	6	–	1
Texas Tech		–		1	–	7	–	2
Delaware		–		0	–	7	–	1
George Washington		–		0	–	8	–	0

The 1929 Catholic University Cardinals football team was an American football team that represented the Catholic University of America as an independent during the 1929 college football season. In their fifth season under head coach John B. McAuliffe, the Cardinals compiled a 5–4 record.

== Schedule ==
Date	Opponent	Site	Result	Attendance	Source
September 28	at Boston College	Fenway Park; Boston, MA	L 6–13		
October 5	Mount St. Mary's	Brookland Stadium; Washington, DC	W 7–0		
October 12	Baltimore	Brookland Stadium; Washington, DC	W 18–0		
October 19	at Villanova	Villanova Stadium; Villanova, PA	L 0–12		
October 26	at Rutgers	Neilson Field; New Brunswick, NJ	W 14–10		
November 2	Manhattan	Brookland Stadium; Washington, DC	W 20–7		
November 9	Duquesne	Brookland Stadium; Washington, DC	L 13–18		
November 16	at William & Mary	Cary Field; Williamsburg, VA	L 13–36		
November 28	George Washington	Brookland Stadium; Washington, DC	W 48–6	5,000	
