= 1929 Delaware Fightin' Blue Hens football team =

American college football season

1929 Delaware Fightin' Blue Hens football
- Conference: Independent
- Record: 0–7–1
- Head coach: Gus Ziegler (1st season)
- Home stadium: Frazer Field

1929 Southern college football independents records
	Conf.			Overall
Team	W	L	T	W		L		T
Western Maryland		–		11	–	0	–	0
Delaware State		–		1	–	0	–	0
Guilford		–		7	–	1	–	1
Texas Mines		–		6	–	1	–	2
Appalachian State		–		4	–	1	–	3
Navy		–		6	–	2	–	2
Georgetown		–		5	–	2	–	2
South Georgia Teachers		–		5	–	2	–	2
Middle Tennessee State Teachers		–		6	–	3	–	1
Beacom College		–		3	–	2	–	0
Wake Forest		–		6	–	5	–	1
Catholic University		–		5	–	4	–	0
West Virginia		–		4	–	3	–	3
Loyola (LA)		–		4	–	4	–	2
Davidson		–		5	–	5	–	0
Texas A&I		–		3	–	4	–	1
East Tennessee State Teachers		–		2	–	5	–	1
Mississippi State Teachers		–		2	–	6	–	1
Texas Tech		–		1	–	7	–	2
Delaware		–		0	–	7	–	1
George Washington		–		0	–	8	–	0

The 1929 Delaware Fightin' Blue Hens football team represented the University of Delaware as an independent during the 1929 college football season. The Fightin' Blue Hens were led by first year head coach Gus Ziegler and played their home games at Frazer Field. They were classified as Independent since they did not have a conference affiliation. The 1929 season was the third winless season in school history after they finished the year 0–7–1.

== Schedule ==
Date	Opponent	Site	Result
October 5	at Rutgers	Neilson Field; New Brunswick, NJ	L 0–19
October 12	Ursinus	Frazer Field; Newark, DE	T 0–0
October 19	Susquehanna	Frazer Field; Newark, DE	L 0–6
October 26	at Mount St. Mary's	Emmitsburg, MD	L 0–39
November 2	Swarthmore	Frazer Field; Newark, DE	L 6–19
November 9	Drexel	Frazer Field; Newark, DE	L 6–21
November 16	at Pennsylvania Military	Chester, PA	L 6–18
November 27	at Haverford	Haverford, PA	L 6–20
