= 1929 Appalachian State Mountaineers football team =

American college football season

1929 Appalachian State Mountaineers football
- Conference: Independent
- Record: 4–1–3
- Head coach: C. B. Johnston (1st season)
- Home stadium: College Field

1929 Southern college football independents records
	Conf.			Overall
Team	W	L	T	W		L		T
Western Maryland		–		11	–	0	–	0
Delaware State		–		1	–	0	–	0
Guilford		–		7	–	1	–	1
Texas Mines		–		6	–	1	–	2
Appalachian State		–		4	–	1	–	3
Navy		–		6	–	2	–	2
Georgetown		–		5	–	2	–	2
South Georgia Teachers		–		5	–	2	–	2
Middle Tennessee State Teachers		–		6	–	3	–	1
Beacom College		–		3	–	2	–	0
Wake Forest		–		6	–	5	–	1
Catholic University		–		5	–	4	–	0
West Virginia		–		4	–	3	–	3
Loyola (LA)		–		4	–	4	–	2
Davidson		–		5	–	5	–	0
Texas A&I		–		3	–	4	–	1
East Tennessee State Teachers		–		2	–	5	–	1
Mississippi State Teachers		–		2	–	6	–	1
Texas Tech		–		1	–	7	–	2
Delaware		–		0	–	7	–	1
George Washington		–		0	–	8	–	0

The 1929 Appalachian State Mountaineers football team represented Appalachian State Teachers College—now known as Appalachian State University—in the 1929 college football season. The team was led by first-year head coach C. B. Johnston and played their home games at College Field in Boone, North Carolina.

== Schedule ==
Date	Opponent	Site	Result
September 30	at Carson–Newman	Jefferson City, TN	T 0–0
October 7	Catawba	College Field; Boone, NC	T 0–0
October 12	East Tennessee Teachers	College Field; Boone, NC	W 26–0
October 19	Bluefield	College Field; Boone, NC	L 7–12
November 2	at North Georgia	Dahlonega, GA	W 19–6
November 9	Belmont Abbey	College Field; Boone, NC	W 28–0
November 16	at Rutherford	Morganton, NC	T 0–0
November 23	Boiling Springs	College Field; Boone, NC	W 6–0
