= 1929 George Washington Colonials football team =

American college football season

1929 George Washington Colonials football
- Conference: Independent
- Record: 0–8
- Head coach: Jim Pixlee (1st season)

1929 Southern college football independents records
	Conf.			Overall
Team	W	L	T	W		L		T
Western Maryland		–		11	–	0	–	0
Delaware State		–		1	–	0	–	0
Guilford		–		7	–	1	–	1
Texas Mines		–		6	–	1	–	2
Appalachian State		–		4	–	1	–	3
Navy		–		6	–	2	–	2
Georgetown		–		5	–	2	–	2
South Georgia Teachers		–		5	–	2	–	2
Middle Tennessee State Teachers		–		6	–	3	–	1
Beacom College		–		3	–	2	–	0
Wake Forest		–		6	–	5	–	1
Catholic University		–		5	–	4	–	0
West Virginia		–		4	–	3	–	3
Loyola (LA)		–		4	–	4	–	2
Davidson		–		5	–	5	–	0
Texas A&I		–		3	–	4	–	1
East Tennessee State Teachers		–		2	–	5	–	1
Mississippi State Teachers		–		2	–	6	–	1
Texas Tech		–		1	–	7	–	2
Delaware		–		0	–	7	–	1
George Washington		–		0	–	8	–	0

The 1929 George Washington Colonials football team was an American football team that represented George Washington University as an independent during the 1929 college football season. In their first season under head coach Jim Pixlee, the team compiled a 0–8 record.

== Schedule ==
Date	Opponent	Site	Result	Attendance	Source
October 5	Manhattan	Wilson Memorial Stadium; Washington, DC	L 7–27	5,000	
October 12	American	Eastern High School Stadium; Washington, DC	L 0–8		
October 19	at Dickinson	Carlisle, PA	L 6–7		
October 26	at CCNY	Lewisohn Stadium; New York, NY	L 0–45		
November 2	at William & Mary	Cary Field; Williamsburg, VA	L 6–51		
November 9	Saint Joseph's	Central High School Stadium; Washington, DC	L 7–12		
November 16	Juniata	Central High School Stadium; Washington, DC	L 0–32		
November 28	at Catholic University	Brookland Stadium; Washington, DC	L 6–48	5,000	
