= 1929 West Virginia Mountaineers football team =

American college football season

1929 West Virginia Mountaineers football
- Conference: Independent
- Record: 4–3–3
- Head coach: Ira Rodgers (5th season)
- Captain: Marshall Glenn
- Home stadium: Mountaineer Field

1929 Southern college football independents records
	Conf.			Overall
Team	W	L	T	W		L		T
Western Maryland		–		11	–	0	–	0
Delaware State		–		1	–	0	–	0
Guilford		–		7	–	1	–	1
Texas Mines		–		6	–	1	–	2
Appalachian State		–		4	–	1	–	3
Navy		–		6	–	2	–	2
Georgetown		–		5	–	2	–	2
South Georgia Teachers		–		5	–	2	–	2
Middle Tennessee State Teachers		–		6	–	3	–	1
Beacom College		–		3	–	2	–	0
Wake Forest		–		6	–	5	–	1
Catholic University		–		5	–	4	–	0
West Virginia		–		4	–	3	–	3
Loyola (LA)		–		4	–	4	–	2
Davidson		–		5	–	5	–	0
Texas A&I		–		3	–	4	–	1
East Tennessee State Teachers		–		2	–	5	–	1
Mississippi State Teachers		–		2	–	6	–	1
Texas Tech		–		1	–	7	–	2
Delaware		–		0	–	7	–	1
George Washington		–		0	–	8	–	0

The 1929 West Virginia Mountaineers football team represented West Virginia University as an independent during the 1929 college football season. In their fifth season under head coach Ira Rodgers, the Mountaineers compiled a 4–3–3 record and were outscored by opponents by a combined total of 95 to 77. They played their home games at Mountaineer Field in Morgantown, West Virginia. Marshall Glenn was the team captain.

== Schedule ==
Date	Opponent	Site	Result	Attendance	Source
September 21	West Virginia Wesleyan	Mountaineer Field; Morgantown, WV	W 16–0		
September 28	Davis & Elkins	Mountaineer Field; Morgantown, WV	L 6–13	12,000	
October 5	Duquesne	Mountaineer Field; Morgantown, WV	T 7–7		
October 12	at Pittsburgh	Pitt Stadium; Pittsburgh, PA (rivalry)	L 7–27	27,000–30,000	
October 19	vs. Washington and Lee	Laidley Field; Charleston, WV	W 26–6	15,000	
October 26	at Oklahoma A&M	Lewis Field; Stillwater, OK	W 9–6	10,000	
November 5	at Fordham	Polo Grounds; New York, NY	T 0–0		
November 9	Detroit	Mountaineer Field; Morgantown, WV	L 0–36	17,000	
November 16	at Georgetown	Griffith Stadium; Washington, DC	T 0–0	20,000	
November 28	Washington & Jefferson	Mountaineer Field; Morgantown, WV	W 6–0	15,000	
