= 1929 Guilford Quakers football team =

American college football season

1929 Guilford Quakers football
- Conference: Independent
- Record: 7–1–1
- Head coach: John Anderson (1st season)

1929 Southern college football independents records
	Conf.			Overall
Team	W	L	T	W		L		T
Western Maryland		–		11	–	0	–	0
Delaware State		–		1	–	0	–	0
Guilford		–		7	–	1	–	1
Texas Mines		–		6	–	1	–	2
Appalachian State		–		4	–	1	–	3
Navy		–		6	–	2	–	2
Georgetown		–		5	–	2	–	2
South Georgia Teachers		–		5	–	2	–	2
Middle Tennessee State Teachers		–		6	–	3	–	1
Beacom College		–		3	–	2	–	0
Wake Forest		–		6	–	5	–	1
Catholic University		–		5	–	4	–	0
West Virginia		–		4	–	3	–	3
Loyola (LA)		–		4	–	4	–	2
Davidson		–		5	–	5	–	0
Texas A&I		–		3	–	4	–	1
East Tennessee State Teachers		–		2	–	5	–	1
Mississippi State Teachers		–		2	–	6	–	1
Texas Tech		–		1	–	7	–	2
Delaware		–		0	–	7	–	1
George Washington		–		0	–	8	–	0

The 1929 Guilford Quakers football team represented Guilford College as an independent during the 1929 college football season. The season was one of the best in the school's history.

== Schedule ==
Date	Opponent	Site	Result	Source
September 28	at King	Bristol, TN	W 20–6	
October 4	Rutherford JC	Greensboro, NC	W 24–0	
October 12	Campbell	Greensboro, NC	W 12–0	
October 18	at Atlantic Christian	Wilson, NC	W 7–0	
October 25	at Erskine	Due West, SC	L 6–45	
November 2	Elon	Greensboro, NC	W 13–6	
November 11	at Catawba	Salisbury, NC	W 6–0	
November 16	at Tusculum	Greeneville, TN	T 6–6	
November 28	at Lynchburg	Lynchburg, VA	W 13–6	
