= 1929 Navy Midshipmen football team =

American college football season

1929 Navy Midshipmen football
- Conference: Independent
- Record: 6–2–2
- Head coach: Bill Ingram (4th season)
- Captain: Lyle Koepke
- Home stadium: Thompson Stadium

1929 Southern college football independents records
	Conf.			Overall
Team	W	L	T	W		L		T
Western Maryland		–		11	–	0	–	0
Delaware State		–		1	–	0	–	0
Guilford		–		7	–	1	–	1
Texas Mines		–		6	–	1	–	2
Appalachian State		–		4	–	1	–	3
Navy		–		6	–	2	–	2
Georgetown		–		5	–	2	–	2
South Georgia Teachers		–		5	–	2	–	2
Middle Tennessee State Teachers		–		6	–	3	–	1
Beacom College		–		3	–	2	–	0
Wake Forest		–		6	–	5	–	1
Catholic University		–		5	–	4	–	0
West Virginia		–		4	–	3	–	3
Loyola (LA)		–		4	–	4	–	2
Davidson		–		5	–	5	–	0
Texas A&I		–		3	–	4	–	1
East Tennessee State Teachers		–		2	–	5	–	1
Mississippi State Teachers		–		2	–	6	–	1
Texas Tech		–		1	–	7	–	2
Delaware		–		0	–	7	–	1
George Washington		–		0	–	8	–	0

The 1929 Navy Midshipmen football team represented the United States Naval Academy during the 1929 college football season. In their fourth season under head coach Bill Ingram, the Midshipmen compiled a 6–2–2 record, shut out four opponents, and outscored all opponents by a combined score of 233 to 59.

The annual Army–Navy Game was not played in 1929 due to disagreement over player eligibility standards.

== Schedule ==
Date	Opponent	Site	Result	Attendance	Source
September 28	Denison	Thompson Stadium; Annapolis, MD	W 47–0		
October 5	William & Mary	Thompson Stadium; Annapolis, MD	W 15–0		
October 12	vs. Notre Dame	Municipal Stadium; Baltimore, MD (rivalry)	L 7–14	64,681–71,000	
October 19	Duke	Thompson Stadium; Annapolis, MD	W 45–13		
October 26	at Princeton	Palmer Stadium; Princeton, NJ	T 13–13		
November 2	at Penn	Franklin Field; Philadelphia, PA	L 2–7		
November 9	Georgetown	Thompson Stadium; Annapolis, MD	T 0–0		
November 16	Wake Forest	Thompson Stadium; Annapolis, MD	W 61–0		
November 23	West Virginia Wesleyan	Thompson Stadium; Annapolis, MD	W 30–6		
November 30	vs. Dartmouth	Franklin Field; Philadelphia, PA	W 13–6		
