= John J. Brady =

American baseball player, coach, and sportswriter (1899–1951)

Biographical details
- Born: February 26, 1899; Wilmington, Delaware
- Died: February 20, 1951 (aged 51); Deerhurst, Delaware

Playing career

Baseball
- c. 1917: Kirkwood
- c. 1918: Parkside

Football
- c. 1918: Parkside

Coaching career (HC unless noted)

Baseball
- 1919–1922: Parkside
- 1923: P. R. R.

Accomplishments and honors

Championships
- 3 AWBL (1919, 1920, 1921)

Awards
- Delaware Sports Museum and Hall of Fame (1993)

John J. Brady (February 26, 1899 – February 20, 1951) was an American baseball player, coach, and sportswriter. He worked with The Morning News for twenty-two years, following a career as a baseball player and coach with Parkside in the All-Wilmington Baseball League. He was inducted into the Delaware Sports Museum and Hall of Fame in 1993.

== Early life and sports career ==
John J. Brady was born on February 26, 1899, in Wilmington, Delaware. After going to high school he started a minor league baseball career in c. 1917 with "Kirkwood" in a Wilmington semi-professional league. After one season there he played football and baseball with Parkside. He became the baseball manager of Parkside in 1919, and led them to an undefeated season and a promotion from the "Boy's City League" to the higher All-Wilmington Baseball League. Upon joining the league his team played Eleventh Ward, league leader, and handed them their first defeat of the year. They won the league championship and eventually the state championship, after defeating Larraine, P. R. R., and the Milford Caulks in the state title playoffs. After going undefeated again the following year and winning another league title, Brady was re-elected to the manager position in 1921. He served with them for two more seasons, leading them to a third consecutive championship in 1921, before leaving to coach the P. R. R. team in 1923.

== Sportswriting career and death ==
He left after one season with the P. R. R. team to become a sportswriter for The Morning News, where he served as a journalist until 1946. He was the managing editor of the paper from 1946 until his death on February 20, 1951. His cause of death was reported a heart attack, which he suffered at his home in Deerhurst. The Delaware Sportswriters and Broadcasters Association named its annual "Delaware Athlete of the Year" in his honor. Brady was inducted into the Delaware Sports Museum and Hall of Fame in 1993.
