= 1929 Georgetown Hoyas football team =

American college football season

1929 Georgetown Hoyas football
- Conference: Independent
- Record: 5–2–2
- Head coach: Lou Little (6th season)
- Captain: Jim Mooney
- Home stadium: Georgetown Field; Griffith Stadium

1929 Southern college football independents records
	Conf.			Overall
Team	W	L	T	W		L		T
Western Maryland		–		11	–	0	–	0
Delaware State		–		1	–	0	–	0
Guilford		–		7	–	1	–	1
Texas Mines		–		6	–	1	–	2
Appalachian State		–		4	–	1	–	3
Navy		–		6	–	2	–	2
Georgetown		–		5	–	2	–	2
South Georgia Teachers		–		5	–	2	–	2
Middle Tennessee State Teachers		–		6	–	3	–	1
Beacom College		–		3	–	2	–	0
Wake Forest		–		6	–	5	–	1
Catholic University		–		5	–	4	–	0
West Virginia		–		4	–	3	–	3
Loyola (LA)		–		4	–	4	–	2
Davidson		–		5	–	5	–	0
Texas A&I		–		3	–	4	–	1
East Tennessee State Teachers		–		2	–	5	–	1
Mississippi State Teachers		–		2	–	6	–	1
Texas Tech		–		1	–	7	–	2
Delaware		–		0	–	7	–	1
George Washington		–		0	–	8	–	0

The 1929 Georgetown Hoyas football team represented Georgetown University as an independent during the 1929 college football season. Led by Lou Little in his sixth and final season as head coach, the team went 5–2–2.

== Schedule ==
Date	Opponent	Site	Result	Attendance	Source
September 28	Mount St. Mary's	Georgetown Field; Washington, DC	W 26–0	5,000	
October 5	Western Maryland	Georgetown Field; Washington, DC	L 0–7		
October 12	Saint Louis	Griffith Stadium; Washington, DC	W 13–0	7,000	
October 19	West Virginia Wesleyan	Griffith Stadium; Washington, DC	W 19–0		
October 26	Lebanon Valley	Griffith Stadium; Washington, DC	W 27–0		
November 2	at NYU	Yankee Stadium; Bronx, NY	W 14–0	50,000	
November 9	at Navy	Thompson Stadium; Annapolis, MD	T 0–0	25,000	
November 16	West Virginia	Griffith Stadium; Washington, DC	T 0–0	20,000	
November 30	at Detroit	Dinan Field; Detroit, MI	L 13–14	10,000	
