= 1929 Texas Mines Miners football team =

American college football season

1929 Texas Mines Miners football
- Conference: Independent
- Record: 6–1–2
- Head coach: Mack Saxon (1st season)
- Home stadium: El Paso High School Stadium

1929 Southern college football independents records
	Conf.			Overall
Team	W	L	T	W		L		T
Western Maryland		–		11	–	0	–	0
Delaware State		–		1	–	0	–	0
Guilford		–		7	–	1	–	1
Texas Mines		–		6	–	1	–	2
Appalachian State		–		4	–	1	–	3
Navy		–		6	–	2	–	2
Georgetown		–		5	–	2	–	2
South Georgia Teachers		–		5	–	2	–	2
Middle Tennessee State Teachers		–		6	–	3	–	1
Beacom College		–		3	–	2	–	0
Wake Forest		–		6	–	5	–	1
Catholic University		–		5	–	4	–	0
West Virginia		–		4	–	3	–	3
Loyola (LA)		–		4	–	4	–	2
Davidson		–		5	–	5	–	0
Texas A&I		–		3	–	4	–	1
East Tennessee State Teachers		–		2	–	5	–	1
Mississippi State Teachers		–		2	–	6	–	1
Texas Tech		–		1	–	7	–	2
Delaware		–		0	–	7	–	1
George Washington		–		0	–	8	–	0

The 1929 Texas Mines Miners football team, sometimes referred to as the "Muckers", was an American football team that represented Texas School of Mines (now known as the University of Texas at El Paso) as an independent during the 1929 college football season. In its first season under head coach Mack Saxon, the team compiled a 6–1–2 record and outscored opponents by a total of 154 to 46.

== Schedule ==
Date	Opponent	Site	Result	Attendance	Source
September 27	New Mexico Mines	El Paso High School Stadium; El Paso, TX	W 46–0		
October 5	Arizona State	El Paso, TX	W 31–7		
October 19	at Arizona	Arizona Stadium; Tucson, AZ	L 0–19		
October 25	Wayland	El Paso, TX	W 9–6	3,000–4,000	
November 2	at Sul Ross	Alpine, TX	T 0–0		
November 9	New Mexico A&M^{†}	El Paso High School Stadium; El Paso, TX	W 8–0	1,700	
November 16	at New Mexico Military	Roswell, NM	W 20–14		
November 23	Gila JC	El Paso High School Stadium; El Paso, TX	W 40–0		
November 30	St. Edward's	El Paso, TX	T 0–0	2,500	
^{†}Homecoming
