= 1929 South Georgia Teachers Blue Tide football team =

American college football season

1929 South Georgia Teachers Blue Tide football
- Conference: Independent
- Record: 5–2–2
- Head coach: Crook Smith (1st season)

1929 Southern college football independents records
	Conf.			Overall
Team	W	L	T	W		L		T
Western Maryland		–		11	–	0	–	0
Delaware State		–		1	–	0	–	0
Guilford		–		7	–	1	–	1
Texas Mines		–		6	–	1	–	2
Appalachian State		–		4	–	1	–	3
Navy		–		6	–	2	–	2
Georgetown		–		5	–	2	–	2
South Georgia Teachers		–		5	–	2	–	2
Middle Tennessee State Teachers		–		6	–	3	–	1
Beacom College		–		3	–	2	–	0
Wake Forest		–		6	–	5	–	1
Catholic University		–		5	–	4	–	0
West Virginia		–		4	–	3	–	3
Loyola (LA)		–		4	–	4	–	2
Davidson		–		5	–	5	–	0
Texas A&I		–		3	–	4	–	1
East Tennessee State Teachers		–		2	–	5	–	1
Mississippi State Teachers		–		2	–	6	–	1
Texas Tech		–		1	–	7	–	2
Delaware		–		0	–	7	–	1
George Washington		–		0	–	8	–	0

The 1929 South Georgia Teachers Blue Tide football team represented the South Georgia Teachers College—now known as Georgia Southern University—as an independent during the 1929 college football season. Led by first-year head coach Crook Smith, the South Georgia Teachers compiled a record of 5–2–2.

== Schedule ==
Date	Opponent	Site	Result	Source
October 11	Brewton–Parker	Statesboro, GA	W 61–0	
October 18	at Middle Georgia	Cochran, GA	T 7–7	
October 26	Georgia State College	Statesboro, GA	W 13–6	
November 2	at Piedmont	Demorest, GA	T 0–0	
November 9	at Academy of Richmond County	Augusta, GA	L 13–19	
November	Swainsboro Athletic Association		W 12–0	
November 18	at Norman Junior College	Moultrie stadium; Moultrie, GA	L 19–32	
November 22	South Georgia State	Statesboro, GA	W 12–6	
November 28	Brewton–Parker		W 7–0	
