= 1929 East Tennessee State Teachers football team =

American college football season

1929 East Tennessee State Teachers football
- Conference: Independent
- Record: 2–6
- Head coach: John Robinson (5th season)
- Captain: Arthur R. "Cap" Isbell

1929 Southern college football independents records
	Conf.			Overall
Team	W	L	T	W		L		T
Western Maryland		–		11	–	0	–	0
Delaware State		–		1	–	0	–	0
Guilford		–		7	–	1	–	1
Texas Mines		–		6	–	1	–	2
Appalachian State		–		4	–	1	–	3
Navy		–		6	–	2	–	2
Georgetown		–		5	–	2	–	2
South Georgia Teachers		–		5	–	2	–	2
Middle Tennessee State Teachers		–		6	–	3	–	1
Beacom College		–		3	–	2	–	0
Wake Forest		–		6	–	5	–	1
Catholic University		–		5	–	4	–	0
West Virginia		–		4	–	3	–	3
Loyola (LA)		–		4	–	4	–	2
Davidson		–		5	–	5	–	0
Texas A&I		–		3	–	4	–	1
East Tennessee State Teachers		–		2	–	5	–	1
Mississippi State Teachers		–		2	–	6	–	1
Texas Tech		–		1	–	7	–	2
Delaware		–		0	–	7	–	1
George Washington		–		0	–	8	–	0

The 1929 East Tennessee State Teachers football team was an American football team that represented East Tennessee State Teacher's College—now known as East Tennessee State University (ETSU)—as an independent in the 1929 college football season. They were led by fifth-year coach John Robinson. Robinson was assisted by William "Willie" Flinn Rogers, who taught history and government at the school from 1925 to 1968. This was Robinson's final year coaching the team, and his squad finished with a 2–6 record.

== Schedule ==
Date	Opponent	Site	Result	Source
October 5	at Carson–Newman	Jefferson City, TN	L 0–25	
October 12	at Appalachian State	College Field; Boone, NC	L 0–26	
October 19	at Hiwassee	Madisonville, TN	L 0–13	
November 2	vs. Union (KY)	Middlesboro, KY	L 0–25	
November 11	Tusculum	Keystone Field; Johnson City, TN	L 0–6	
November 16	at Bluefield	Bluefield, VA	W 13–7	
November 23	Weaver	Johnson City, TN	W 6–0	
November 30	Mars Hill	Keystone Field; Johnson City, TN	L 6–14	
