= Stoney Willis =

American football player (1912–1994)

McDaniel Green Terror
- Position: Quarterback

Personal information
- Born: June 17, 1912; Big Stone Gap, Virginia, U.S.
- Died: March 24, 1994 (aged 81); Westminster, Maryland, U.S.

Career information
- College: Western Maryland (1932)

Awards and highlights
- First shovel pass

Eugene "Stoney" Willis (June 17, 1912 – March 24, 1994) was an American football quarterback and is the first documented player to use the shovel pass in a competitive football game.

== Career ==
As quarterback for Western Maryland College, Willis used the play in a game against Boston College to tie the game. The play was featured in a large photograph appearing in The Boston Herald on November 12, 1932. As noted by team captain, Hal Kopp (Class of 1933) this article proved that the Western Maryland College quarterback "was the first to use the famed shovel pass in its present form." The Boston Herald article noted, "Just as Flavio Tosi appeared to have Willis in his grasp, tall Gene popped the shovel pass to Dunn and Jimmy was off again."
