= 1929 Texas Tech Matadors football team =

American college football season

1929 Texas Tech Matadors football
- Conference: Independent
- Record: 1–7–2
- Head coach: Grady Higginbotham (1st season)
- Offensive scheme: T formation
- Base defense: 7–2–2
- Captain: Sidney Knowles
- Home stadium: Tech Field

1929 Southern college football independents records
	Conf.			Overall
Team	W	L	T	W		L		T
Western Maryland		–		11	–	0	–	0
Delaware State		–		1	–	0	–	0
Guilford		–		7	–	1	–	1
Texas Mines		–		6	–	1	–	2
Appalachian State		–		4	–	1	–	3
Navy		–		6	–	2	–	2
Georgetown		–		5	–	2	–	2
South Georgia Teachers		–		5	–	2	–	2
Middle Tennessee State Teachers		–		6	–	3	–	1
Beacom College		–		3	–	2	–	0
Wake Forest		–		6	–	5	–	1
Catholic University		–		5	–	4	–	0
West Virginia		–		4	–	3	–	3
Loyola (LA)		–		4	–	4	–	2
Davidson		–		5	–	5	–	0
Texas A&I		–		3	–	4	–	1
East Tennessee State Teachers		–		2	–	5	–	1
Mississippi State Teachers		–		2	–	6	–	1
Texas Tech		–		1	–	7	–	2
Delaware		–		0	–	7	–	1
George Washington		–		0	–	8	–	0

The 1929 Texas Tech Matadors football team represented Texas Technological College—now known as Texas Tech University—as an independent during the 1929 college football season. In their first and only season under head coach Grady Higginbotham, the Matadors compiled a 1–7–2 record and were outscored by opponents by a combined total of 141 to 31. The team played its home games at Tech Field.

== Schedule ==
Date	Opponent	Site	Result	Attendance	Source
September 28	Wayland	Tech Field; Lubbock, TX	W 19–0	3,500	
October 5	vs. Sul Ross	Highland Fairgrounds; Marfa, TX	T 7–7	6,000	
October 12	Daniel Baker	Tech Field; Lubbock, TX	L 2–6	2,700	
October 19	at McMurry	Abilene, TX	T 0–0		
October 26	TCU	Tech Field; Lubbock, TX (rivalry)	L 0–22	6,500	
November 2	at Baylor	Cotton Palace; Waco, TX (rivalry)	L 0–34		
November 11	Abilene Christian	Tech Field; Lubbock, TX	L 3–7	4,000	
November 19	Howard Payne	Tech Field; Lubbock, TX	L 0–14	1,500	
November 28	at Simmons (TX)	Parramore Field; Abilene, TX	L 0–21	5,000	
December 6	West Texas State	Tech Field; Lubbock, TX	L 0–19	1,500	
