= Goldey–Beacom College =

Private college in Wilmington, Delaware, US

Coordinates: 39°44′31.3″N 75°41′22.3″W

- Former names: Wilmington Commercial College/Goldey College (1886–1951); Beacom College (1900–1951)
- Type: Private university
- Established: 1886; 140 years ago
- President: Colleen Perry Keith
- Faculty: 83 (21 full-time)
- Undergraduates: 731
- Postgraduates: 596
- Location: Pike Creek Valley, Delaware (Wilmington address), U.S.
- Campus: Suburban, 24 acres (9.7 ha)
- Colors: Blue & gold
- Nickname: Lightning
- Sporting affiliations: NCAA Division II; CACC
- Mascot: Strike
- Website: gbc.edu
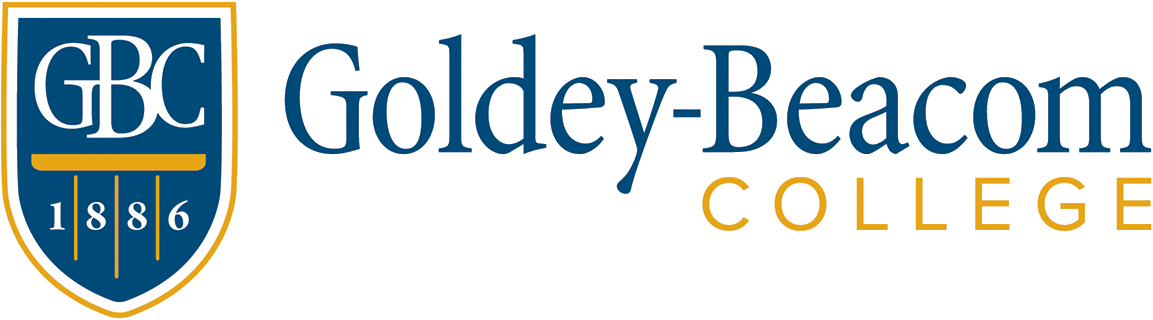

Goldey–Beacom College is a private university in Pike Creek Valley, Delaware, United States. Its setting is suburban with a campus of 24 acres (9.7 ha). It uses a semester-based academic calendar and is accredited to award certificates, associate, baccalaureate, master's, and doctoral degrees. The institution traces its origins to 1886 when H. S. Goldey opened the Wilmington Commercial College. The current name results from a 1951 merger with Beacom College, founded by and named for W. H. Beacom, a former instructor at Goldey's school.

Wilmington Commercial College about 1906

== Campus ==
The campus has an area of 24 acres (9.7 ha), consisting of four apartment-style residence halls and one traditional-style residence hall, Fulmer Center (home to classrooms and administrative offices), athletic fields, and the Joseph West Jones Center (housing admissions, athletics, student engagement, residence life, career services, library, gymnasium, fitness center, dining hall, music room and the campus store).

== Academics ==
The institution awards Bachelor of Science and Bachelor of Arts degrees. It also offers graduate degrees.

=== Accreditation ===
Goldey-Beacom is accredited by the Middle States Commission on Higher Education to award degrees through the doctoral level. Some of its programs are also accredited by the Association of Collegiate Business Schools and Programs (ACBSP).

== Athletics ==
The Goldey–Beacom athletic teams are called the Lightning. The college is a member of the NCAA Division II ranks in all sports, primarily competing as a member of the Central Atlantic Collegiate Conference (CACC) since the 1999–2000 academic year.

Goldey–Beacom competes in 13 intercollegiate varsity sports. Men's sports include baseball, basketball, cross country, golf, soccer and track & field; women's sports include basketball, cross country, soccer, softball, tennis, track & field and volleyball.
