= List of Texas Conference football standings =

This is a list of yearly Texas Conference football standings.

== Texas Conference football standings ==
1926 Texas Conference football standings
	Conf.					Overall
Team	W		L		T	W		L		T
Simmons (TX) $	2	–	0	–	1	6	–	3	–	1
Howard Payne	3	–	1	–	0	4	–	4	–	1
Trinity (TX)	2	–	1	–	1	3	–	5	–	2
Austin	1	–	2	–	0	4	–	5	–	0
Southwestern (TX)	0	–	4	–	0	0	–	9	–	0
$ – Conference champion

1927 Texas Conference football standings
	Conf.					Overall
Team	W		L		T	W		L		T
Southwestern (TX) $	2	–	1	–	1	4	–	2	–	1
Simmons (TX)	2	–	1	–	2	5	–	3	–	2
Howard Payne	3	–	2	–	0	6	–	3	–	0
St. Edward's	1	–	1	–	1	3	–	3	–	3
Trinity (TX)	1	–	2	–	1	3	–	5	–	1
Austin	0	–	2	–	1	1	–	5	–	1
$ – Conference champion

1928 Texas Conference football standings
	Conf.					Overall
Team	W		L		T	W		L		T
Howard Payne $	5	–	0	–	0	10	–	1	–	0
St. Edward's	3	–	1	–	0	6	–	5	–	0
Austin	2	–	2	–	0	4	–	6	–	0
Simmons (TX)	2	–	3	–	0	6	–	6	–	1
Southwestern (TX)	2	–	3	–	0	5	–	4	–	0
Trinity (TX)	0	–	5	–	0	2	–	8	–	0
$ – Conference champion

1929 Texas Conference football standings
	Conf.					Overall
Team	W		L		T	W		L		T
Howard Payne $	5	–	0	–	0	8	–	0	–	2
St. Edward's	4	–	1	–	0	5	–	4	–	2
Austin	3	–	2	–	0	3	–	6	–	0
Simmons (TX)	1	–	3	–	1	5	–	4	–	1
Trinity (TX)	1	–	3	–	1	3	–	5	–	1
Southwestern (TX)	0	–	5	–	0	2	–	8	–	0
$ – Conference champion

1930 Texas Conference football standings
	Conf.					Overall
Team	W		L		T	W		L		T
Howard Payne $	4	–	0	–	1	7	–	2	–	2
Southwestern (TX)	3	–	1	–	1	3	–	4	–	4
Simmons (TX)	1	–	1	–	3	5	–	1	–	4
Austin	2	–	2	–	1	3	–	5	–	1
St. Edward's	0	–	3	–	2	1	–	4	–	2
Trinity (TX)	1	–	4	–	0	2	–	6	–	0
$ – Conference champion

1931 Texas Conference football standings
	Conf.					Overall
Team	W		L		T	W		L		T
Howard Payne +	4	–	1	–	0	6	–	2	–	0
Simmons (TX) +	4	–	1	–	0	6	–	5	–	0
Austin	3	–	2	–	0	3	–	5	–	1
Southwestern (TX)	2	–	3	–	0	4	–	6	–	0
St. Edward's	1	–	3	–	1	1	–	5	–	1
Trinity (TX)	0	–	4	–	1	2	–	6	–	1
+ – Conference co-champions

1932 Texas Conference football standings
	Conf.					Overall
Team	W		L		T	W		L		T
Howard Payne $	4	–	0	–	0	7	–	1	–	0
Southwestern (TX)	3	–	1	–	0	3	–	3	–	3
Simmons (TX)	1	–	2	–	1	4	–	5	–	1
St. Edward's	1	–	2	–	1	3	–	5	–	2
Austin	0	–	4	–	0	0	–	9	–	0
$ – Conference champion

1933 Texas Conference football standings
	Conf.					Overall
Team	W		L		T	W		L		T
St. Edward's $	5	–	1	–	0	7	–	2	–	0
Howard Payne	4	–	2	–	0	5	–	3	–	1
Abilene Christian *	2	–	1	–	2	5	–	3	–	2
McMurry	3	–	2	–	0	4	–	4	–	2
Austin	1	–	2	–	2	1	–	6	–	2
Simmons (TX)	1	–	2	–	1	4	–	5	–	1
Southwestern (TX)	1	–	4	–	1	1	–	8	–	2
Daniel Baker	0	–	4	–	2	0	–	7	–	2
$ – Conference champion; * – Abilene Christian's game against Texas A&I counted in conference standings even though Texas A&I was not a conference member.

1934 Texas Conference football standings
	Conf.					Overall
Team	W		L		T	W		L		T
Howard Payne $	5	–	0	–	1	9	–	0	–	1
St. Edward's	2	–	1	–	2	2	–	4	–	2
Daniel Baker	2	–	1	–	2	3	–	5	–	3
McMurry	2	–	1	–	3	3	–	3	–	3
Hardin–Simmons	2	–	2	–	1	3	–	5	–	2
Austin	2	–	4	–	2	3	–	5	–	2
Southwestern (TX)	2	–	4	–	1	3	–	5	–	2
Trinity (TX)	1	–	3	–	1	2	–	6	–	1
Abilene Christian	1	–	3	–	1	1	–	7	–	2
$ – Conference champion

1935 Texas Conference football standings
	Conf.					Overall
Team	W		L		T	W		L		T
Austin $	4	–	0	–	2	7	–	2	–	2
McMurry	4	–	2	–	0	6	–	3	–	0
Howard Payne	3	–	1	–	3	5	–	2	–	3
Trinity (TX)	2	–	2	–	1	4	–	3	–	1
Daniel Baker	2	–	3	–	1	4	–	5	–	2
Abilene Christian	1	–	4	–	1	1	–	6	–	3
Southwestern (TX)	1	–	4	–	1	1	–	8	–	1
St. Edward's	1	–	4	–	1	3	–	5	–	1
Hardin–Simmons *	2	–	0	–	0	6	–	3	–	1
$ – Conference champion; * – did not compete for championship

1936 Texas Conference football standings
	Conf.					Overall
Team	W		L		T	W		L		T
Howard Payne $	5	–	0	–	1	7	–	2	–	1
Daniel Baker	5	–	1	–	0	7	–	2	–	2
McMurry	5	–	1	–	1	8	–	1	–	1
Austin	3	–	3	–	0	4	–	4	–	2
Southwestern (TX)	1	–	4	–	1	4	–	6	–	1
Abilene Christian	1	–	4	–	1	1	–	7	–	1
St. Edward's	1	–	4	–	0	1	–	5	–	1
Trinity (TX)	0	–	4	–	2	0	–	6	–	3
$ – Conference champion

1937 Texas Conference football standings
	Conf.					Overall
Team	W		L		T	W		L		T
Howard Payne $	7	–	0	–	0	8	–	1	–	1
Austin	6	–	1	–	0	8	–	2	–	0
McMurry	5	–	2	–	0	7	–	2	–	1
Texas Wesleyan	3	–	2	–	0	6	–	3	–	0
Daniel Baker	3	–	4	–	0	4	–	6	–	0
Southwestern (TX)	2	–	4	–	0	6	–	5	–	0
Trinity (TX)	2	–	4	–	0	2	–	7	–	0
St. Edward's	1	–	5	–	0	2	–	8	–	0
Abilene Christian	0	–	6	–	0	0	–	9	–	0
$ – Conference champion

1938 Texas Conference football standings
	Conf.					Overall
Team	W		L		T	W		L		T
Howard Payne $	6	–	0	–	1	7	–	3	–	1
St. Edward's	4	–	2	–	0	7	–	3	–	0
Southwestern (TX)	4	–	2	–	0	6	–	4	–	0
Trinity (TX)	4	–	2	–	0	4	–	6	–	0
Abilene Christian	3	–	2	–	1	6	–	2	–	1
Texas Wesleyan	2	–	3	–	0	3	–	4	–	1
Austin	2	–	5	–	0	2	–	8	–	0
Daniel Baker	1	–	5	–	0	1	–	9	–	0
McMurry	1	–	6	–	0	1	–	8	–	0
$ – Conference champion

1939 Texas Conference football standings
	Conf.					Overall
Team	W		L		T	W		L		T
Abilene Christian +	5	–	1	–	0	6	–	2	–	1
St. Edward's +	5	–	1	–	0	6	–	3	–	0
Trinity (TX)	4	–	1	–	2	6	–	3	–	2
Howard Payne	4	–	2	–	1	5	–	4	–	1
Texas Wesleyan	2	–	2	–	1	4	–	5	–	2
Southwestern (TX)	3	–	3	–	0	3	–	5	–	0
Daniel Baker	3	–	4	–	0	4	–	6	–	0
McMurry	1	–	6	–	0	1	–	6	–	0
Austin	0	–	7	–	0	0	–	10	–	0
+ – Conference co-champions

1940 Texas Conference football standings
	Conf.					Overall
Team	W		L		T	W		L		T
Abilene Christian +	5	–	1	–	0	7	–	2	–	0
Texas Wesleyan +	5	–	1	–	0	7	–	2	–	0
Howard Payne +	5	–	1	–	0	6	–	4	–	0
Austin	3	–	2	–	0	?	–	?	–	?
Trinity (TX)	4	–	3	–	0	4	–	5	–	1
Southwestern (TX)	2	–	5	–	0	5	–	6	–	0
McMurry	1	–	6	–	0	1	–	9	–	0
Daniel Baker	0	–	6	–	0	0	–	11	–	0
+ – Conference co-champions

1941 Texas Conference football standings
	Conf.					Overall
Team	W		L		T	W		L		T
Howard Payne $	6	–	0	–	0	8	–	1	–	1
Abilene Christian	5	–	1	–	0	6	–	3	–	0
Texas Wesleyan	5	–	1	–	0	5	–	3	–	0
Southwestern (TX)	3	–	3	–	1	4	–	3	–	1
McMurry	2	–	4	–	1	4	–	4	–	1
Austin	2	–	4	–	0	2	–	6	–	0
Trinity (TX)	1	–	5	–	0	1	–	7	–	0
Daniel Baker	0	–	6	–	0	0	–	7	–	0
$ – Conference champion

1942 Texas Conference football standings
	Conf.					Overall
Team	W		L		T	W		L		T
Howard Payne $	4	–	0	–	0	7	–	2	–	0
Abilene Christian	3	–	1	–	0	6	–	2	–	0
Southwestern (TX)	2	–	2	–	0	6	–	4	–	0
McMurry	1	–	3	–	0	2	–	6	–	0
Austin	0	–	4	–	0	0	–	8	–	0
$ – Conference champion

1946 Texas Conference football standings
	Conf.					Overall
Team	W		L		T	W		L		T
Abilene Christian +	3	–	0	–	1	8	–	1	–	1
Southwestern (TX) +	3	–	0	–	1	5	–	4	–	1
McMurry	2	–	2	–	0	4	–	4	–	1
Howard Payne	1	–	3	–	0	2	–	5	–	2
Austin	1	–	3	–	0	2	–	6	–	2
+ – Conference co-champions

1947 Texas Conference football standings
	Conf.					Overall
Team	W		L		T	W		L		T
McMurry +	4	–	1	–	0	7	–	3	–	1
Hardin +	4	–	1	–	0	7	–	4	–	0
Abilene Christian	3	–	2	–	0	6	–	3	–	0
Howard Payne	2	–	3	–	0	4	–	6	–	0
Austin	2	–	3	–	0	2	–	6	–	1
Southwestern (TX)	0	–	5	–	0	3	–	6	–	0
+ – Conference co-champions

1948 Texas Conference football standings
	Conf.					Overall
Team	W		L		T	W		L		T
McMurry $	4	–	1	–	0	6	–	4	–	0
Abilene Christian	3	–	1	–	1	5	–	3	–	1
Hardin	3	–	1	–	1	4	–	5	–	1
Howard Payne	2	–	3	–	0	5	–	5	–	0
Southwestern (TX)	2	–	3	–	0	6	–	3	–	0
Austin	0	–	5	–	0	2	–	9	–	0
$ – Conference champion

1949 Texas Conference football standings
	Conf.					Overall
Team	W		L		T	W		L		T
McMurry $	4	–	0	–	1	8	–	2	–	1
Texas A&I	3	–	2	–	0	8	–	2	–	0
Howard Payne	3	–	2	–	0	6	–	5	–	0
Austin	3	–	2	–	0	5	–	5	–	0
Abilene Christian	1	–	4	–	0	3	–	6	–	0
Southwestern (TX)	0	–	4	–	1	3	–	7	–	2
$ – Conference champion

1950 Texas Conference football standings
	Conf.					Overall
Team	W		L		T	W		L		T
Abilene Christian $	5	–	0	–	0	11	–	0	–	0
Texas A&I	4	–	1	–	0	6	–	3	–	0
Southwestern (TX)	2	–	3	–	0	5	–	5	–	0
Howard Payne	2	–	3	–	0	4	–	5	–	1
McMurry	2	–	3	–	0	4	–	5	–	0
Austin	0	–	5	–	0	2	–	7	–	0
$ – Conference champion

1951 Texas Conference football standings
	Conf.					Overall
Team	W		L		T	W		L		T
Abilene Christian +	3	–	1	–	0	6	–	4	–	0
Texas A&I +	3	–	1	–	0	5	–	4	–	0
Howard Payne +	3	–	1	–	0	4	–	4	–	0
McMurry	1	–	3	–	0	3	–	7	–	0
Austin	0	–	4	–	0	2	–	7	–	0
+ – Conference co-champions

1952 Texas Conference football standings
	Conf.					Overall
Team	W		L		T	W		L		T
Abilene Christian $	4	–	0	–	0	6	–	3	–	1
McMurry	3	–	1	–	0	4	–	4	–	1
Texas A&I	1	–	3	–	0	3	–	8	–	0
Howard Payne	1	–	3	–	0	3	–	6	–	0
Austin	1	–	3	–	0	2	–	7	–	0
$ – Conference champion

1953 Texas Conference football standings
	Conf.					Overall
Team	W		L		T	W		L		T
McMurry +	3	–	1	–	0	8	–	1	–	1
Abilene Christian +	3	–	1	–	0	7	–	3	–	0
Texas A&I +	3	–	1	–	0	4	–	5	–	0
Howard Payne	1	–	3	–	0	2	–	7	–	0
Austin	0	–	4	–	0	5	–	4	–	0
$ – Conference champion

1954 Texas Conference football standings
	Conf.					Overall
Team	W		L		T	W		L		T
Howard Payne $	2	–	0	–	0	9	–	1	–	0
McMurry	1	–	1	–	0	6	–	3	–	1
Eastern New Mexico	0	–	2	–	0	6	–	3	–	0
$ – Conference champion

1955 Texas Conference football standings
	Conf.					Overall
Team	W		L		T	W		L		T
McMurry $	2	–	0	–	0	8	–	2	–	0
Howard Payne	1	–	1	–	0	6	–	2	–	2
Eastern New Mexico	0	–	2	–	0	5	–	4	–	0
$ – Conference champion
