= 1934 Hardin–Simmons Cowboys football team =

American college football season

1934 Hardin–Simmons Cowboys football
- Conference: Texas Conference
- Record: 3–5–2 (2–2–1 Texas)
- Head coach: Les Cranfill (5th season)

1934 Texas Conference football standings
| | Conf. | | | | | Overall |
| Team | W | | L | | T | W | | L | | T |
|---|---|---|---|---|---|---|---|---|---|---|
| Howard Payne $ | 5 | – | 0 | – | 1 | 9 | – | 0 | – | 1 |
| St. Edward's | 2 | – | 1 | – | 2 | 2 | – | 4 | – | 2 |
| Daniel Baker | 2 | – | 1 | – | 2 | 3 | – | 5 | – | 3 |
| McMurry | 2 | – | 1 | – | 3 | 3 | – | 3 | – | 3 |
| Hardin–Simmons | 2 | – | 2 | – | 1 | 3 | – | 5 | – | 2 |
| Austin | 2 | – | 4 | – | 2 | 3 | – | 5 | – | 2 |
| Southwestern (TX) | 2 | – | 4 | – | 1 | 3 | – | 5 | – | 2 |
| Trinity (TX) | 1 | – | 3 | – | 1 | 2 | – | 6 | – | 1 |
| Abilene Christian | 1 | – | 3 | – | 1 | 1 | – | 7 | – | 2 |
$ – Conference champion

The 1934 Hardin–Simmons Cowboys football team was an American football team that represented Hardin–Simmons University as a member of the Texas Conference during the 1934 college football season. The team compiled a 3–5–2 overall record with a conference mark of 2–2–1.

Les Cranfill was the team's head coach for the fifth year. He had played football at Hardin-Simmons and had first joined the school's coaching staff in 1926. Following three consecutive losing seasons, the school's athletic director, G.B. Sandefer, announced in January 1935 that Cranfill had resigned as head coach.

== Schedule ==
| Date | Opponent | Site | Result | Attendance | Source |
|---|---|---|---|---|---|
| September 22 | at Amarillo* | Amarillo, TX | T 13–13 | | |
| September 28 | Sul Ross* | Abilene, TX | W 18–6 | | |
| October 6 | vs. St. Edward's | Wichita Falls, TX | L 7–9 | | |
| October 12 | at Trinity (TX) | Waxahachie, TX | T 0–0 | | |
| October 19 | Baylor* | Abilene, TX | L 6–13 | | |
| October 26 | at Southwestern (TX) | Georgetown, TX | L 0–6 | | |
| November 2 | Daniel Baker | Abilene, TX | W 6–0 | | |
| November 9 | at Texas Tech* | Tech Field; Lubbock, TX | L 0–13 | 3,500 | |
| November 17 | at Texas Mines* | Kidd Field; El Paso, TX | L 3–13 | 2,500 | |
| November 23 | Austin | Abilene, TX | W 45–0 | | |
*Non-conference game
