= Carl Anderson (American football) =

American football coach (1898–1978)

- Anderson pictured in The Lasso 1952, Howard Payne yearbook

Biographical details
- Born: September 9, 1898; Fort Worth, Texas, U.S.
- Died: April 30, 1978 (aged 79); Oceanside, California, U.S.

Playing career
- 1921–1923: Centre
- 1924–1925: Centenary
- 1926: Geneva
- Position: Halfback

Coaching career (HC unless noted)
- 1927–1928: Western Kentucky State Normal (assistant)
- 1929: Western Kentucky State Normal
- 1930: Kansas State (freshmen)
- 1934–1937: Western Kentucky State Teachers
- 1938–1945: Indiana (backfield)
- 1946–1950: Centre
- 1951–1952: Howard Payne

Administrative career (AD unless noted)
- 1946–1951: Centre
- 1951–1953: Howard Payne

Head coaching record
- Overall: 45–42–5

Accomplishments and honors

Championships
- 1 Texas Conference (1951)

Carl Rudolph Frederick "Swede" Anderson IV (September 9, 1898 – April 30, 1978) was an American college football coach at Western Kentucky University and Howard Payne University. Anderson graduated from Centre College in Danville, Kentucky in 1924, where he played in the backfield with legendary alumnus Bo McMillin. Anderson then followed McMillin to Centenary College of Louisiana and Geneva College. Anderson then served one year as the head football coach at Western Kentucky, before moving to Kansas State as its freshman team coach in 1930. Anderson returned to Western Kentucky as its head coach from 1934 to 1937. He was the backfield coach under McMillin at Indiana from 1938 to 1945. He then returned to his alma mater, Centre College, where he coached the Praying Colonels until 1950. The following season, Anderson became the seventh head football coach at the Howard Payne University in Brownwood, Texas and held that position from 1951 to 1952. His coaching record at Howard Payne was 7–10. Anderson died in 1978 of a heart attack, in Oceanside, California.

== Head coaching record ==
Year	Team	Overall	Conference	Standing	Bowl/playoffs
Western Kentucky State Normal Hilltoppers (Southern Intercollegiate Athletic Association) (1929)
1929	Western Kentucky State Normal	7–3	3–3	T–16th	
Western Kentucky State Teachers Hilltoppers (Southern Intercollegiate Athletic Association) (1934–1937)
1934	Western Kentucky State Teachers	4–2–2	4–1–1	T–6th	
1935	Western Kentucky State Teachers	7–3	5–2	13th	
1936	Western Kentucky State Teachers	6–3	3–2	T–14	
1937	Western Kentucky State Teachers	7–1–1	3–0–1	T–3rd	
Western Kentucky State Teachers:		24–9–3	18–8–2		
Centre Colonels (Independent) (1946–1950)
1946	Centre	0–7			
1947	Centre	2–5–1			
1948	Centre	4–4			
1949	Centre	2–6			
1950	Centre	6–1–1			
Centre:		14–23–2			
Howard Payne Yellow Jackets (Texas Conference) (1951–1952)
1951	Howard Payne	4–4	3–1	T–1st	
1952	Howard Payne	3–6	1–3	T–3rd	
Howard Payne:		7–10	4–4		
Total:		45–42–5			
National championship Conference title Conference division title or championship game berth

== See also ==
- List of college football head coaches with non-consecutive tenure
