= Dewey Mayhew =

American football and baseball coach (1898–1974)

Biographical details
- Born: December 21, 1898; Texas, U.S.
- Died: January 6, 1974 (aged 75); Temple, Texas, U.S.

Coaching career (HC unless noted)

Football
- 1923–1926: Marlin HS (TX)
- 1927–1940: Abilene HS (TX)
- 1945: Southwestern (TX) (assistant)
- 1946–1953: Texas A&I

Baseball
- 1946: Southwestern (TX)

Administrative career (AD unless noted)
- 1946–1954: Texas A&I

Head coaching record
- Overall: 39–34–1 (college football); 0–13 (college baseball)
- Bowls: 1–0

Accomplishments and honors

Championships
- Football; 2 Texas Conference (1951, 1953)

Dewey Alexander Mayhew (December 21, 1898 – January 6, 1974) was an American football and baseball coach. He coached high school football at Marlin and Abilene, before serving as head coach at Texas College of Arts and Industries—now known as Texas A&M University–Kingsville—from 1946 to 1953. Mayhew won to state championships at Abilene (1928, 1931) and left as the all-time winningest coach with a record of 97–36–11, but was passed in 2007 by current Abilene coach Steve Warren. He died of congestive heart failure in 1974.

== Head coaching record ==
=== College football ===
Year	Team	Overall	Conference	Standing	Bowl/playoffs
Texas A&I Javelinas (Independent) (1946–1948)
1946	Texas A&I	2–6			
1947	Texas A&I	7–1–1			
1948	Texas A&I	5–5			
Texas A&I Javelinas (Texas Conference) (1946–1949)
1949	Texas A&I	8–2	3–2	T–2nd	
1950	Texas A&I	6–3	4–1	2nd	
1951	Texas A&I	5–4	3–1	T–1st	
1952	Texas A&I	3–8	1–3	T–3rd	W International Bowl
1953	Texas A&I	3–5	3–1	T–1st	
Texas A&I:		39–34–1	14–8		
Total:		39–34–1			
National championship Conference title Conference division title or championship game berth
