= Joe Bailey Cheaney =

American football and basketball coach

- Cheaney pictured in The Lasso 1929, Howard Payne yearbook

Biographical details
- Born: December 30, 1902; Ranger, Texas, U.S.
- Died: March 16, 1983 (aged 80); San Marcos, Texas, U.S.

Playing career

Football
- 1921–1924: Howard Payne
- Position: Halfback

Coaching career (HC unless noted)

Football
- 1925: San Marcos Baptist Academy (TX)
- 1926–1927: Howard Payne (assistant)
- 1928–1934: Howard Payne
- 1935–1942: Southwest Texas State
- 1943–1947: Howard Payne

Basketball
- 1927–1935: Howard Payne
- 1935–1939: Southwest Texas State
- 1942–1943: Southwest Texas State
- 1946–1947: Howard Payne

Head coaching record
- Overall: 81–62–13 (college football); 102–89 (college basketball)

Accomplishments and honors

Championships
- Football; 6 Texas Conference (1928–1932, 1934)

Joe Bailey Cheaney (December 30, 1902 – March 16, 1983) was an American football and basketball coach. He served two stints as the head football coach at Howard Payne University in Brownwood, Texas, from 1928 to 1934, and 1946 to 1947, and one stint at Southwest Texas State University—now known was Texas State University—from 1935 to 1942, compiling a career college football coaching record of 81–62–13. His career coaching record at Howard Payne was 58–20–9.

Cheaney was born on December 30, 1902, in Ranger, Texas. He graduated from Santa Anna High School in Santa Anna, Texas in 1921 and Howard Payne in 1925. He started in football as a halfback at Howard Payne, leading the Yellow Jackets to the Texas Intercollegiate Athletic Association (TIAA) title in 1924. He also was a sprinter on the track and field team, winning the TIAA championships for three years in the 100-yard and 200-yard dashes. Cheaney began his coaching career in 1925 as the football coach at San Marcos Baptist Academy in San Marcos, Texas.

Cheane died on March 16, 1983, in San Marcos.

== Head coaching record ==
=== College football ===
Year	Team	Overall	Conference	Standing	Bowl/playoffs
Howard Payne Yellow Jackets (Texas Conference) (1928–1934)
1928	Howard Payne	10–1	5–0	1st	
1929	Howard Payne	8–0–2	5–0	1st	
1930	Howard Payne	7–2–2	4–0–1	1st	
1931	Howard Payne	6–2	4–1	T–1st	
1932	Howard Payne	7–1	4–0	1st	
1933	Howard Payne	5–3–1	4–2	2nd	
1934	Howard Payne	9–0–1	5–0–1	1st	
Southwest Texas State Bobcats (Lone Star Conference) (1935–1942)
1935	Southwest Texas State	2–7	1–3	4th	
1936	Southwest Texas State	3–5–1	1–3	4th	
1937	Southwest Texas State	6–4	2–2	3rd	
1938	Southwest Texas State	0–8	0–4	5th	
1939	Southwest Texas State	3–5–2	0–3–1	5th	
1940	Southwest Texas State	3–5–1	0–4	5th	
1941	Southwest Texas State	4–4	3–1	2nd	
1942	Southwest Texas State	3–4–1	0–2–1	4th	
Southwest Texas State:		24–42–5	7–22–2		
Howard Payne Yellow Jackets (Texas Conference) (1946–1947)
1946	Howard Payne	2–5–2	1–3	T–4th	
1947	Howard Payne	4–6	2–3	T–4th	
Howard Payne:		58–20–8	34–8–2		
Total:		82–62–13			
National championship Conference title Conference division title or championship game berth
