= Ron Harms =

American football coach

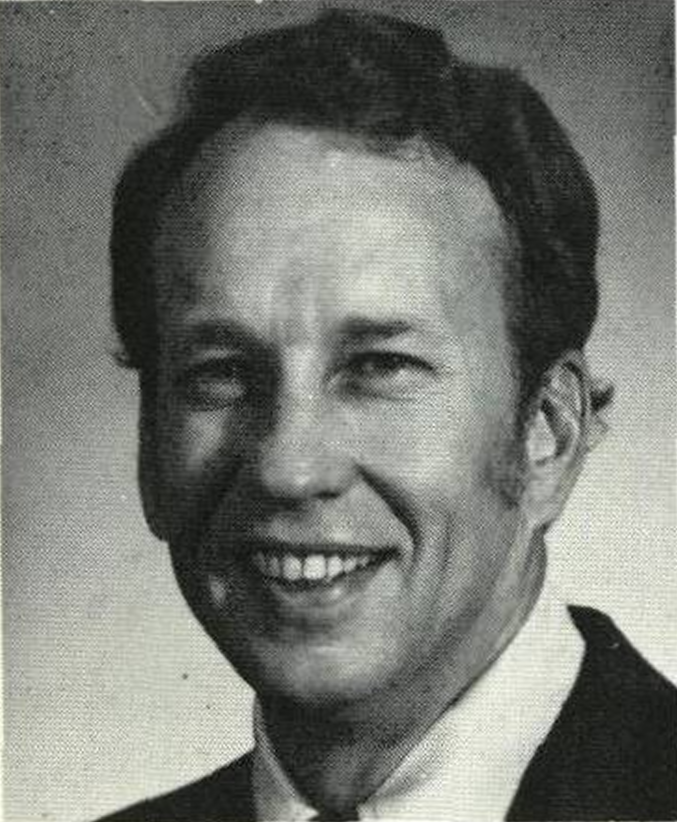
- Harms, c. 1976

Biographical details
- Born: September 11, 1936 (age 89); Houston, Texas, U.S.

Playing career

Football
- 1956–1958: Valparaiso

Coaching career (HC unless noted)

Football
- 1962–1963: Concordia (NE) (assistant)
- 1964–1969: Concordia (NE)
- 1970–1973: Adams State
- 1974–1975: Texas A&I (OC)
- 1976–1978: Baylor (assistant)
- 1979–1999: Texas A&I / Texas A&M–Kingsville

Track and field
- 1962–1964: Concordia (NE)

Cross country
- 1962–1964: Concordia (NE)

Head coaching record
- Overall: 218–112–5 (football)
- Tournaments: Football; 3–0 (NAIA D-I playoffs); 12–9 (NCAA D-II playoffs)

Accomplishments and honors

Championships
- Football; 1 NAIA Division I (1979); 1 RMAC (1972); 10 LSC (1979, 1985, 1987–1989, 1993–1997); 1 RMAC Mountain Division (1971); 2 LSC South Division (1997–1998)

Awards
- Football; NAIA Division I Coach of the Year (1979)
- College Football Hall of Fame; Inducted in 2012 (profile)

Ron Harms (born September 11, 1936) is an American former college football coach. He served as head football coach at Concordia Teachers College (now known as Concordia University Nebraska) from 1964 to 1969, Adams State College (now known as Adams State University) from 1970 to 1973 and at Texas A&M University–Kingsville (formerly Texas A&I University) from 1979 to 1999, compiling a career college football head coaching record of 218–112–5. Harms was inducted into the College Football Hall of Fame in 2012.

Harms served as offensive coordinator for Gil Steinke in 1974 and 1975 before becoming an assistant to Grant Teaff at Baylor University for three years. Harms returned to Texas A&I in 1979 to replace Fred Jonas as head coach. In his first season, he guided the Javelinas to an NAIA Division I National Championship. With Harms at the helm, the Javelinas captured ten Lone Star Conference championships in total.

== Coaching career ==
Harms was hired in 1962 as an assistant football coach and head coach in track and field and cross country at Concordia Teachers College—know known as Concordia University Nebraska—in Seward, Nebraska. Two years later, he succeeded Ralph Starenko as head football coach.

Harms was the 12th head football coach at Adams State College in Alamosa, Colorado and he held that position for four seasons, from 1970 until 1973. His coaching record at Adams State was 21–14–2.

== Head coaching record ==
=== Football ===
Year	Team	Overall	Conference	Standing	Bowl/playoffs
Concordia Bulldogs (Tri-State Conference) (1964–1968)
1964	Concordia	5–4	3–3	5th	
1965	Concordia	6–3	3–3	4th	
1966	Concordia	2–5–2	2–4	T–4th	
1967	Concordia	2–7	1–5	6th	
1968	Concordia	6–3	5–1	2nd	
Concordia Bulldogs (Nebraska Intercollegiate Athletic Conference / Tri-State Conference) (1969)
1969	Concordia	4–5–1	1–2–1 / 4–1–1	3rd / 2nd	
Concordia:		25–27–3	18–19–1		
Adams State Indians (Rocky Mountain Athletic Conference) (1970–1973)
1970	Adams State	4–3–2	4–2	3rd (Plains)	
1971	Adams State	5–4	5–1	T–1st (Plains)	
1972	Adams State	6–3	5–1	1st	
1973	Adams State	6–3	4–2	T–2nd	
Adams State:		21–13–2	18–6		
Texas A&I / Texas A&M–Kingsville Javelinas (Lone Star Conference) (1979–1999)
1979	Texas A&I	12–1	6–1	1st	W NAIA Division I Championship (Palm Bowl)
1980	Texas A&I	7–4	5–2	3rd	
1981	Texas A&I	9–2	5–2	T–2nd	
1982	Texas A&I	5–6	2–5	6th	
1983	Texas A&I	2–9	2–5	6th	
1984	Texas A&I	6–5	3–1	2nd	
1985	Texas A&I	8–3	5–0	1st	
1986	Texas A&I	9–2	4–2	2nd	
1987	Texas A&I	9–2	4–1	T–1st	
1988	Texas A&I	10–3	6–1	1st	L NCAA Division II Semifinal
1989	Texas A&I	10–1	7–0	1st	L NCAA Division II First Round
1990	Texas A&I	6–4	5–2	T–2nd	
1991	Texas A&I	7–3	4–2	4th	
1992	Texas A&I	9–3	6–0	1st	L NCAA Division II Quarterfinal
1993	Texas A&M–Kingsville	7–6	5–0	1st	L NCAA Division II Semifinal
1994	Texas A&M–Kingsville	12–2	5–0	1st	L NCAA Division II Championship
1995	Texas A&M–Kingsville	11–2	7–0	1st	L NCAA Division II Semifinal
1996	Texas A&M–Kingsville	8–3	7–0	1st	L NCAA Division II First Round
1997	Texas A&M–Kingsville	9–2	9–0 / 7–0	1st / 1st (South)	L NCAA Division II First Round
1998	Texas A&M–Kingsville	11–3	8–1 / 8–1	2nd / 1st (South)	L NCAA Division II Semifinal
1999	Texas A&M–Kingsville	5–6	5–4 / 5–4	T–6th / T–3rd (South)	
Texas A&I / Texas A&M–Kingsville:		172–72	110–29		
Total:		218–112–5			
National championship Conference title Conference division title or championship game berth

== See also ==
- List of college football career coaching wins leaders
