= 1930 Simmons Cowboys football team =

American college football season

1930 Simmons Cowboys football
- Conference: Texas Conference
- Record: 5–1–4 (1–1–3 Texas)
- Head coach: Les Cranfill (1st season)

1930 Texas Conference football standings
	Conf.					Overall
Team	W		L		T	W		L		T
Howard Payne $	4	–	0	–	1	7	–	2	–	2
Southwestern (TX)	3	–	1	–	1	3	–	4	–	4
Simmons (TX)	1	–	1	–	3	5	–	1	–	4
Austin	2	–	2	–	1	3	–	5	–	1
St. Edward's	0	–	3	–	2	1	–	4	–	2
Trinity (TX)	1	–	4	–	0	2	–	6	–	0
$ – Conference champion

The 1930 Simmons Cowboys football team was an American football team that represented Simmons University (later known as Hardin-Simmons University) as a member of the Texas Conference during the 1930 college football season. In its first season under head coach Les Cranfill, the team compiled a 5–1–4 record and outscored opponents by a total of 142 to 45.

== Schedule ==
Date	Time	Opponent	Site	Result	Attendance	Source
September 26		John Tarleton*	Parramore Field; Abilene, TX	W 32–0		
October 4	2:30 p.m.	vs. TCU*	Buckaroo Field; Breckenridge, TX	T 0–0		
October 10		St. Edward's	Parramore Field; Abilene, TX	T 0–0		
October 17		Daniel Baker*	Parramore Field; Abilene, TX	W 33–0		
October 24		at Howard Payne	Brownwood, TX	T 7–7		
October 31		at Southwestern (TX)	Georgetown, TX	T 13–13	1,500	
November 11		Trinity (TX)	Parramore Field; Abilene, TX	W 2–0		
November 14		at Austin	Sherman, TX	L 9–13		
November 22		vs. West Texas State*	Butler Field; Amarillo, TX	W 26–6		
November 27		at Texas Tech*	Tech Field; Lubbock, TX	W 20–6	3,500	
*Non-conference game; All times are in Central time
