= Cranfill =

Cranfill is a surname. Notable people with the surname include:

- James B. Cranfill (1858–1942), American religious figure and prohibitionist
- Les Cranfill (1899–1983), American football, basketball, and baseball coach
- Raimond Cranfill, botanist
