= Garvin Beauchamp =

American football coach

- Beauchamp pictured in Prickly Pear 1953, Abilene Christian yearbook

Biographical details
- Born: April 30, 1920; Post, Texas, U.S.
- Died: December 2, 2002 (aged 82); Abilene, Texas, U.S.

Coaching career (HC unless noted)
- 1950–1955: Abilene Christian

Head coaching record
- Overall: 39–18–4
- Bowls: 1–0

Accomplishments and honors

Championships
- 4 Texas Conference (1950–1953); 1 GCC (1955)

Garvin Vastine Beauchamp (April 30, 1920 – December 2, 2002) was an American football coach. He was the seventh head football coach at Abilene Christian University in Abilene, Texas, serving for six seasons, from 1950 to 1955, and compiling a record of 39–18–4.

== Head coaching record ==
Year	Team	Overall	Conference	Standing	Bowl/playoffs
Abilene Christian Wildcats (Texas Conference) (1950–1953)
1950	Abilene Christian	11–0	5–0	1st	W Refrigerator
1951	Abilene Christian	6–4	3–1	T–1st	
1952	Abilene Christian	6–3–1	4–0	1st	
1953	Abilene Christian	7–3	3–1	T–1st	
Abilene Christian Wildcats (Independent) (1954)
1954	Abilene Christian	6–3–1			
Abilene Christian Wildcats (Gulf Coast Conference) (1955)
1955	Abilene Christian	3–5–2	2–1	T–1st	
Abilene Christian:		39–18–4	17–3		
Total:		39–18–4			
National championship Conference title Conference division title or championship game berth
