= 1932 West Texas State Buffaloes football team =

American college football season

1932 West Texas State Buffaloes football
- Conference: Texas Intercollegiate Athletic Association
- Record: 4–2–2 (3–0–1 TIAA)
- Head coach: Samuel D. Burton (6th season)
- Captain: Bill McClendon
- Home stadium: Buffalo Stadium

1932 Texas Intercollegiate Athletic Association football standings
	Conf.					Overall
Team	W		L		T	W		L		T
Texas A&I $	3	–	0	–	0	6	–	2	–	0
West Texas State	3	–	0	–	1	4	–	2	–	2
Sul Ross	3	–	0	–	1	?	–	?	–	?
McMurry	2	–	3	–	0	2	–	4	–	2
Abilene Christian	1	–	4	–	0	2	–	6	–	1
Daniel Baker	0	–	5	–	0	2	–	7	–	1
$ – Conference champion

The 1932 West Texas State Buffaloes football team represented West Texas State Teachers College—now known as West Texas A&M University—as a member of the Texas Intercollegiate Athletic Association (TIAA) during the 1932 college football season. Led by Samuel D. Burton in his sixth and final season as head coach, the Buffaloes compiled an overall record of 4–2–2 with a mark of 3–0–1 in conference play, tying for second place in the TIAA. West Texas State played home games at Buffalo Stadium in Canyon, Texas.

== Schedule ==
Date	Time	Opponent	Site	Result	Source
September 23	8:00 p.m.	Simmons (TX)*	Buffalo Stadium; Canyon, TX	L 0–6	
October 7	8:00 p.m.	Wayland*	Buffalo Stadium; Canyon, TX	W 52–0	
October 14		at Daniel Baker	Brownwood, TX	W 12–0	
October 20	2:30 p.m.	at McMurry	Eagle Stadium; Abilene, TX	W 19–0	
October 28	8:00 p.m.	Abilene Christian	Buffalo Stadium; Canyon, TX	W 12–0	
November 5		Sul Ross	Buffalo Stadium; Canyon, TX	T 7–7	
November 11		at New Mexico Military*	Roswell, NM	T 7–7	
November 18	2:30 p.m.	at Oklahoma City*	Goldbug Field; Oklahoma City, OK	L 9–19	
*Non-conference game; All times are in Central time
