= 1951 Southwest Texas State Bobcats football team =

American college football season

1951 Southwest Texas State Bobcats football
- Conference: Lone Star Conference
- Record: 6–3–1 (2–2–1 LSC)
- Head coach: Milton Jowers (1st season)
- Home stadium: Evans Field

1951 Lone Star Conference football standings
	Conf.					Overall
Team	W		L		T	W		L		T
East Texas State $	5	–	0	–	0	9	–	2	–	0
Southwest Texas State	2	–	2	–	1	6	–	3	–	1
Sam Houston State	2	–	2	–	1	4	–	4	–	1
Stephen F. Austin	2	–	3	–	0	4	–	4	–	1
Lamar Tech	2	–	3	–	0	4	–	6	–	0
Sul Ross	1	–	4	–	0	3	–	7	–	0
$ – Conference champion

The 1951 Southwest Texas State Bobcats football team was an American football team that represented Southwest Texas State Teachers College (now known as Texas State University) during the 1951 college football season as a member of the Lone Star Conference (LSC). In their first year under head coach Milton Jowers, the team compiled an overall record of 6–3–1 with a mark of 2–2–1 in conference play, tying for second place in the LSC.

== Schedule ==
Date	Opponent	Site	Result	Source
September 15	San Marcos AFB*	Evans Field; San Marcos, TX	W 54–0	
September 22	at Texas Lutheran*	Seguin, TX	W 46–0	
September 29	Texas A&I*	Evans Field; San Marcos, TX	W 41–6	
October 6	Trinity (TX)*	Evans Field; San Marcos, TX	W 27–14	
October 13	at Sul Ross	Jackson Field; Alpine, TX	W 14–7	
October 20	at Stephen F. Austin	Memorial Stadium; Nacogdoches, TX	L 20–27	
October 27	Howard Payne*	Evans Field; San Marcos, TX	L 14–27	
November 3	at Lamar Tech	Greenie Stadium; Beaumont, TX	W 14–13	
November 10	Sam Houston State	Evans Field; San Marcos, TX (rivalry)	T 20–20	
November 17	East Texas State	Evans Field; San Marcos, TX	L 21–28	
*Non-conference game
