= 1950 Gustavus Adolphus Golden Gusties football team =

American college football season

1950 Gustavus Adolphus Golden Gusties football
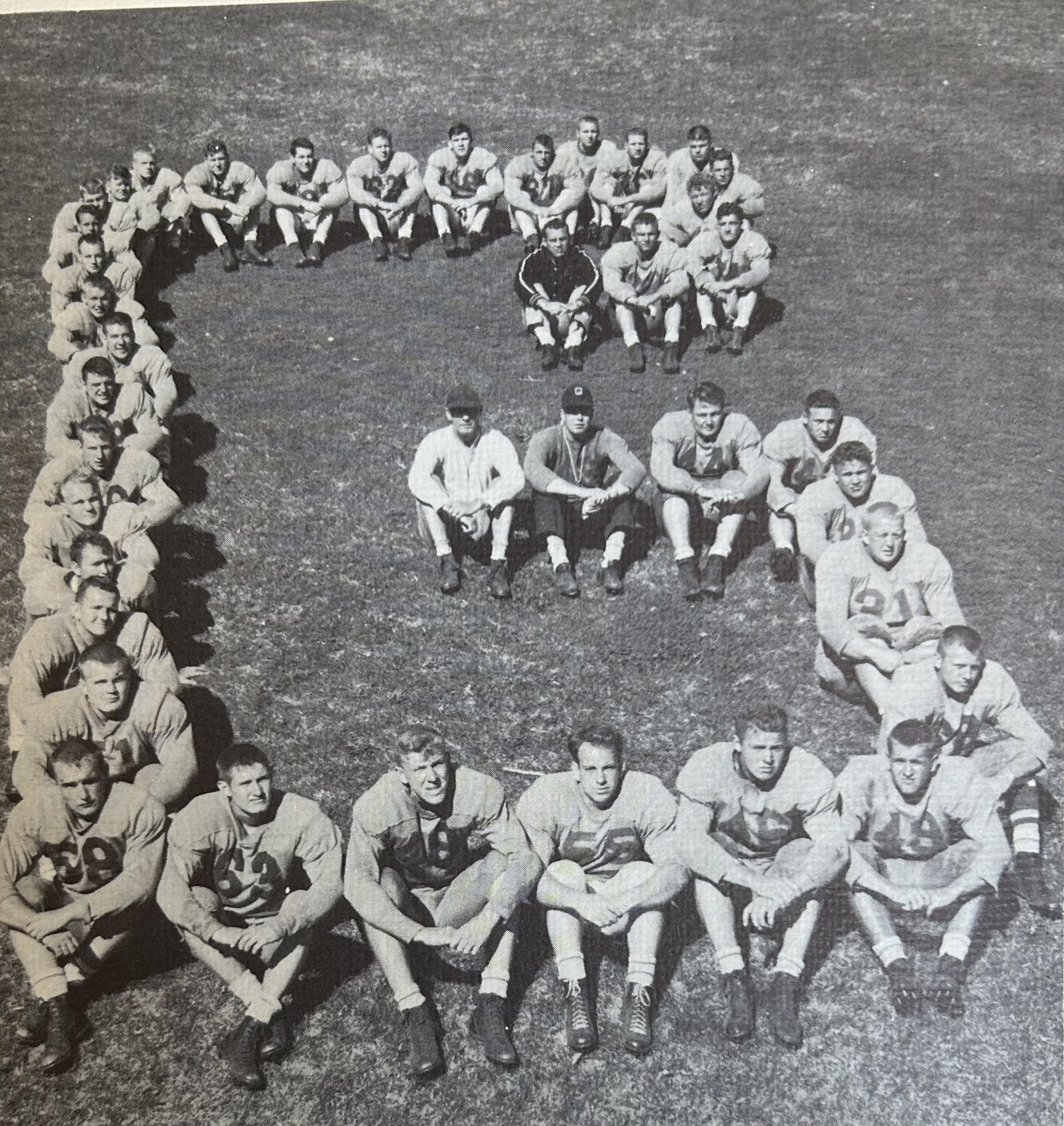

MIAC champion

Refrigerator Bowl, L 7–13 vs. Abilene Christian
- Conference: Minnesota Intercollegiate Athletic Conference
- Record: 9–2 (6–0 MIAC)
- Head coach: Lloyd Hollingsworth (6th season)
- Captain: Gene Payne

1950 Minnesota Intercollegiate Athletic Conference football standings
	Conf.					Overall
Team	W		L		T	W		L		T
Gustavus Adolphus $	6	–	0	–	0	9	–	2	–	0
St. Thomas (MN)	5	–	1	–	0	5	–	3	–	0
Hamline	4	–	2	–	0	5	–	2	–	0
Macalester	3	–	2	–	1	5	–	3	–	1
Saint John's (MN)	3	–	3	–	0	4	–	3	–	0
Minnesota–Duluth	3	–	3	–	0	4	–	3	–	0
Concordia (MN)	2	–	4	–	0	3	–	4	–	0
St. Olaf	2	–	4	–	0	2	–	6	–	0
Augsburg	1	–	5	–	0	1	–	5	–	1
Saint Mary's (MN)	0	–	5	–	1	1	–	5	–	1
$ – Conference champion

The 1950 Gustavus Adolphus Golden Gusties football team was an American football team that represented Gustavus Adolphus College of St. Peter, Minnesota, as a member of the Minnesota Intercollegiate Athletic Conference (MIAC) during the 1950 college football season. In their sixth and final year under head coach Lloyd Hollingsworth, the Gusties compiled a 9–2 record (6–0 in MIAC games), won the MIAC championship, and outscored opponents by a total of 284 to 73. The team won its first nine games before losing to La Crosse State in the last game of the regular season and to Abilene Christian in the Refrigerator Bowl.

During the regular season, the Gusties shut out five opponents and ranked sixth nationally in total defense among small college teams, giving up only 140.2 yards per game—81.5 yards rushing and 87.7 yards passing.

== Schedule ==
Date	Opponent	Site	Result	Attendance	Source
September 9	at Augustana (SD)*	Viking stadium; Sioux Falls, SD	W 25–0		
September 16	at Emporia State*	Emporia, KS	W 26–7		
September 21	Augsburg	St. Peter, MN	W 33–0		
September 28	Concordia (MN)	St. Peter, MN	W 47–6		
October 5	at Youngstown*	Youngstown, OH	W 20–14	8,059	
October 13	at St. Thomas (MN)	O'Shaughnessy field; St. Paul, MN	W 34–0	9,013	
October 20	at Macalester	St. Paul, MN	W 13–7		
October 28	at Saint John's (MN)	Collegeville, MN	W 34–0		
November 4	St. Olaf^{†}	St. Peter, MN	W 53–0	6,000	
November 11	at La Crosse State*	Memorial Field; La Crosse, WI	L 13–20	8,000	
December 2	vs. Abilene Christian*	Reitz Bowl; Evansville, IN (Refrigerator Bowl)	L 7–13	7,500–8,000	
*Non-conference game; ^{†}Homecoming

== Personnel ==
=== Notable players ===
Halfback Gene Payne was the team captain and ranked ninth among the nation's leading scorers with 91 points (15 touchdowns and an extra pint) in the regular season. (Payne added another six points with a rushing touchdown in the Refrigerator Bowl.) Payne tallied 862 rushing yards on 193 carries in the regular season. Quarterback Tom Zweiner set a new school record with 64 completions in 128 attempts for 1,005 yards and 13 touchdowns.

Tackle Cal Roberts was selected by the Associated Press as a first-team player on the 1950 Little All-America college football team.

End Haldo Norman was a unanimous selection for the 1961 All-MIAC football team. Three other Gustavus Adolphus players also received first-team honors: back Gene Payne; tackle Cal Roberts; and center Kenneth Quist.

=== Departure of Hollingsworth ===
In December 1950, with the outbreak of the Korean War, coach Hollingsworth was called to active duty in the National Guard. He was replaced as head coach by his line coach Lee Krough.

=== Gallery ===
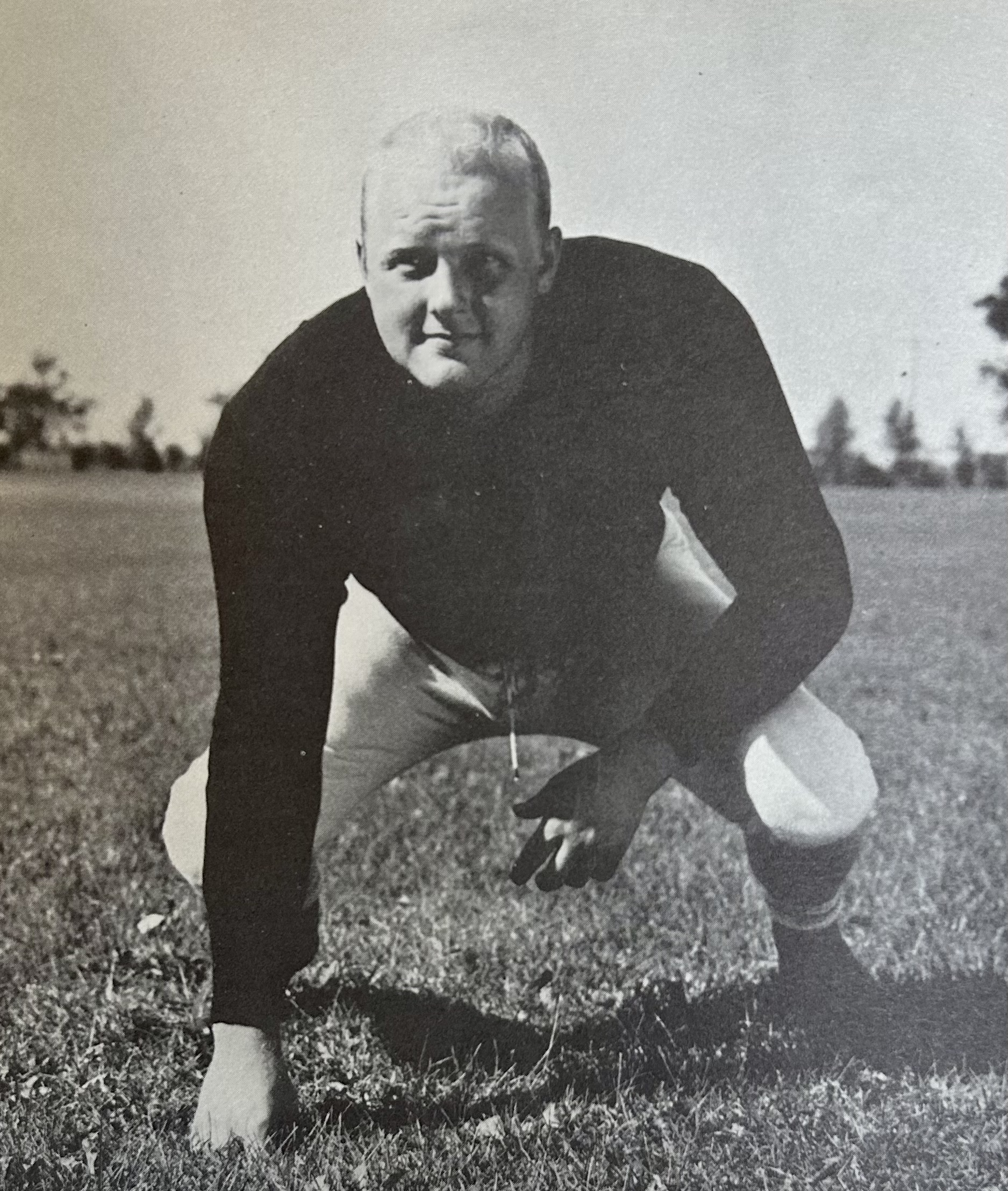
Tackle Calvin Roberts

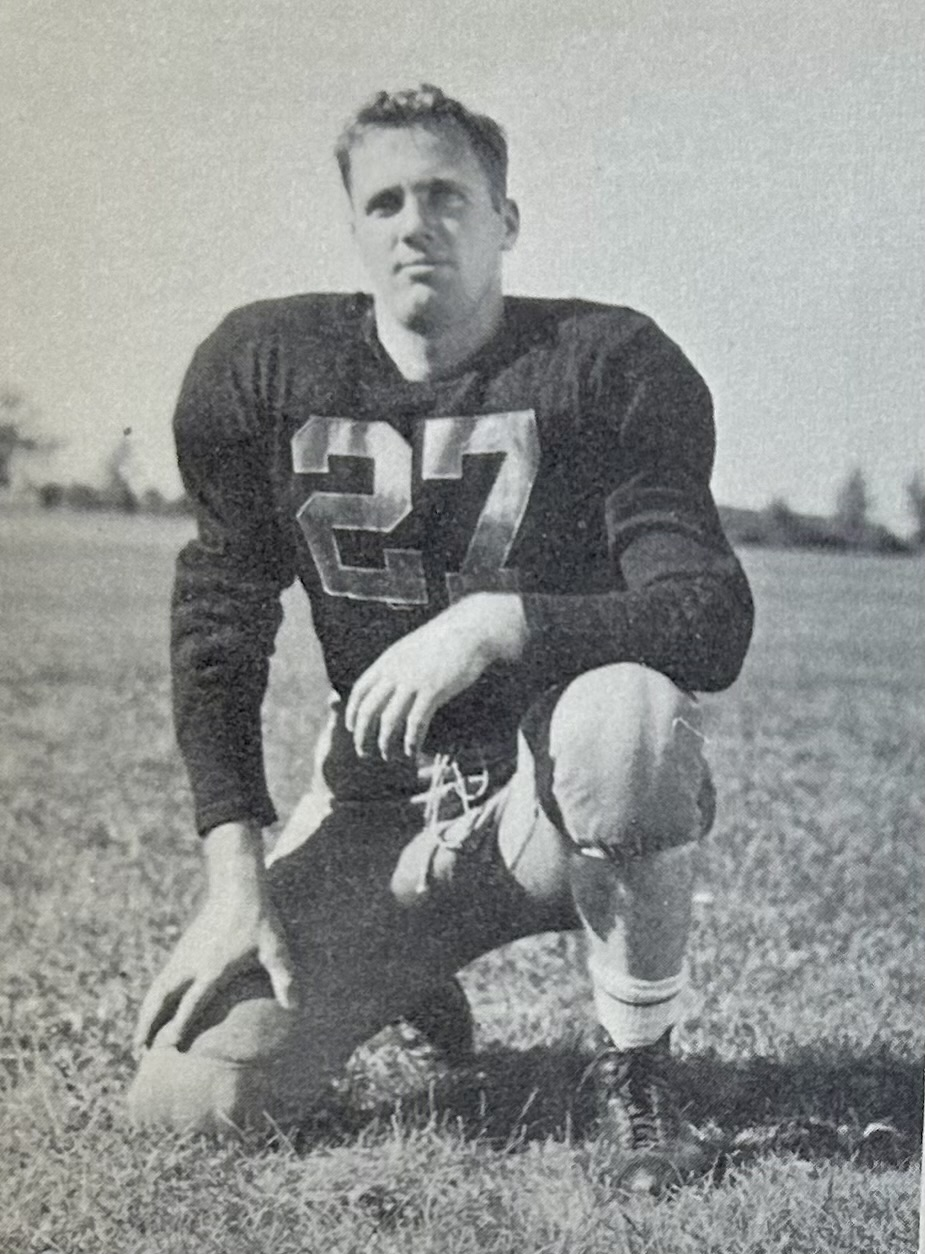
Quarterback Tom Zweiner

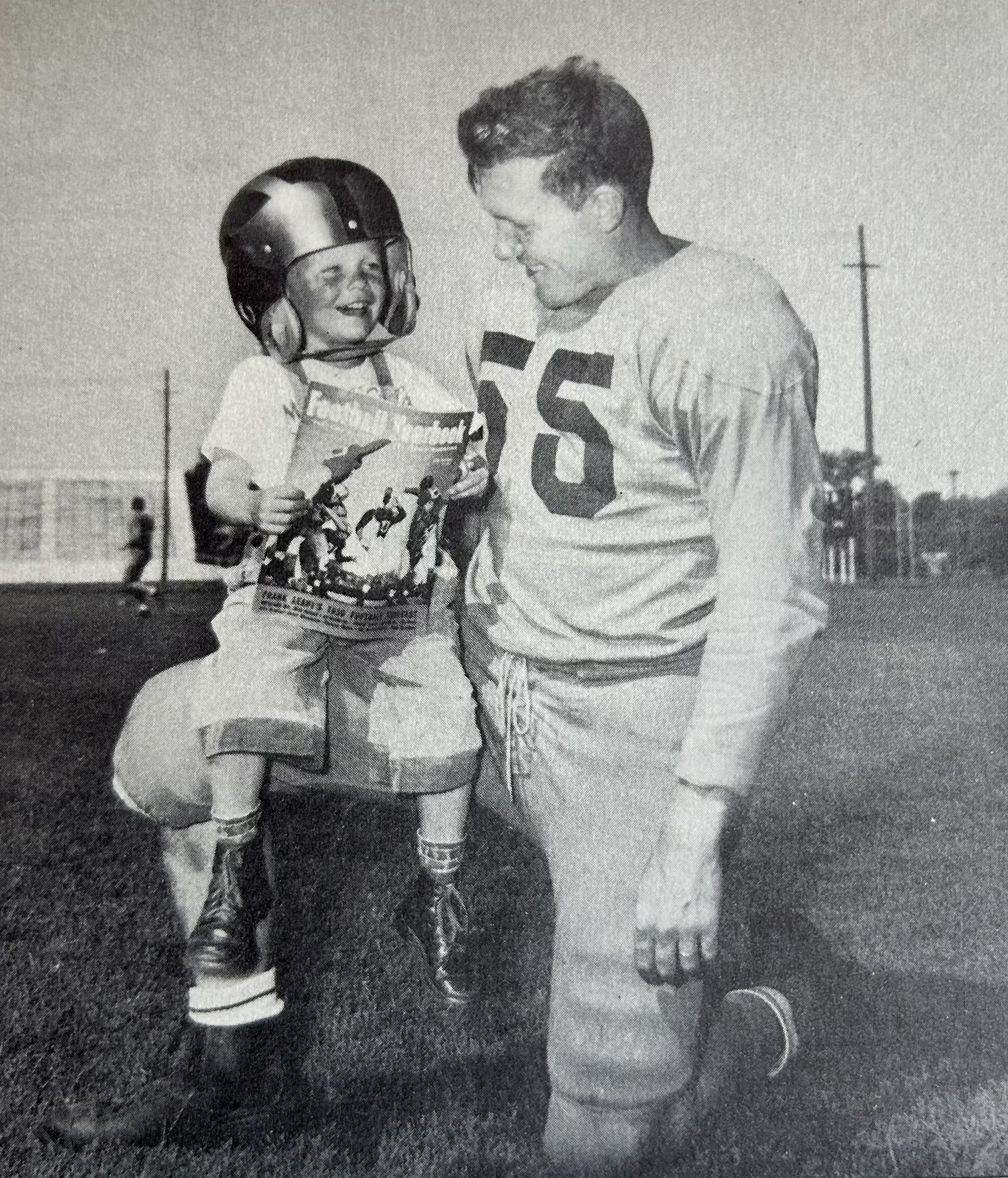
Halfback Gene Payne and son Harlan

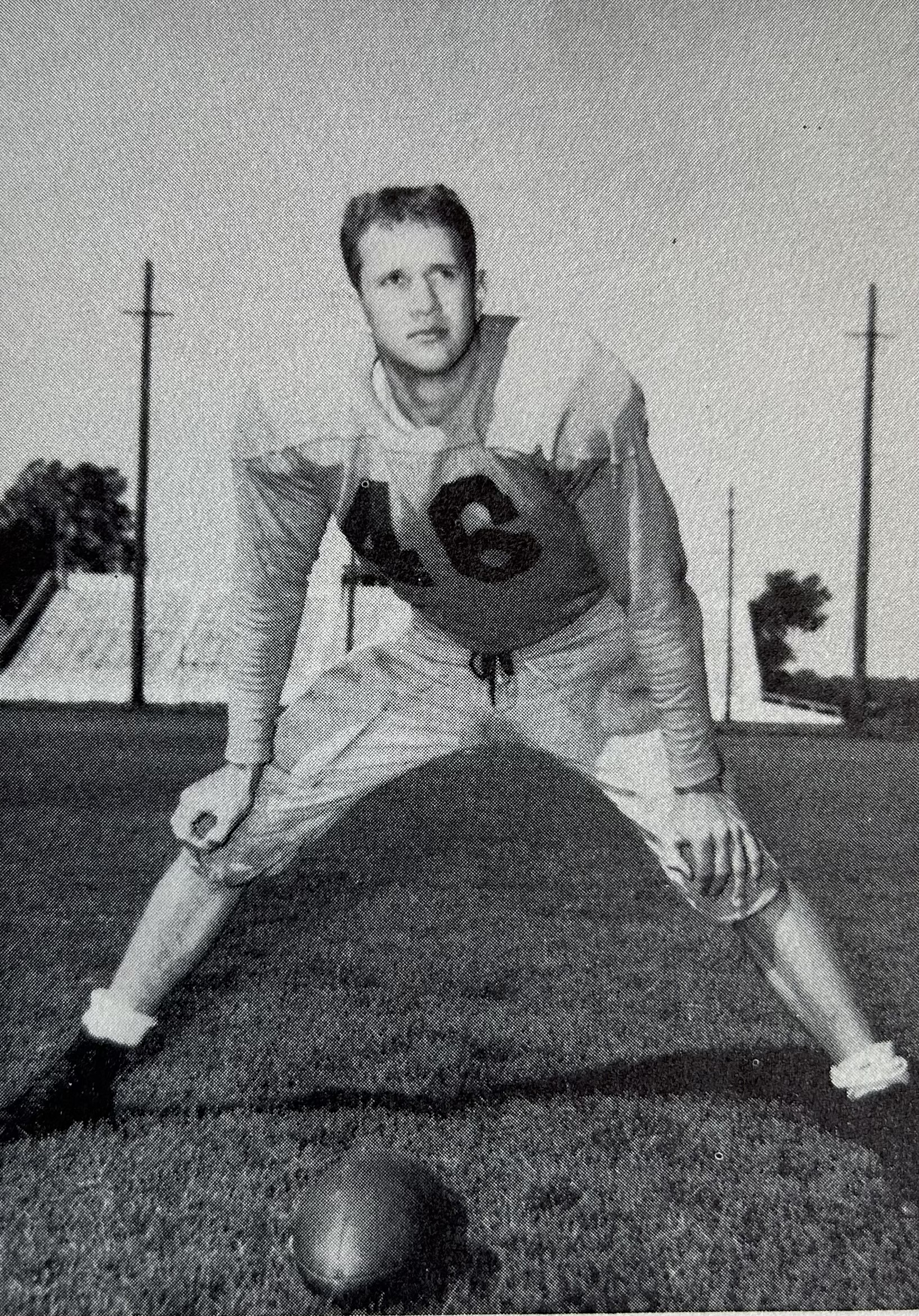
Center Kenneth Quist

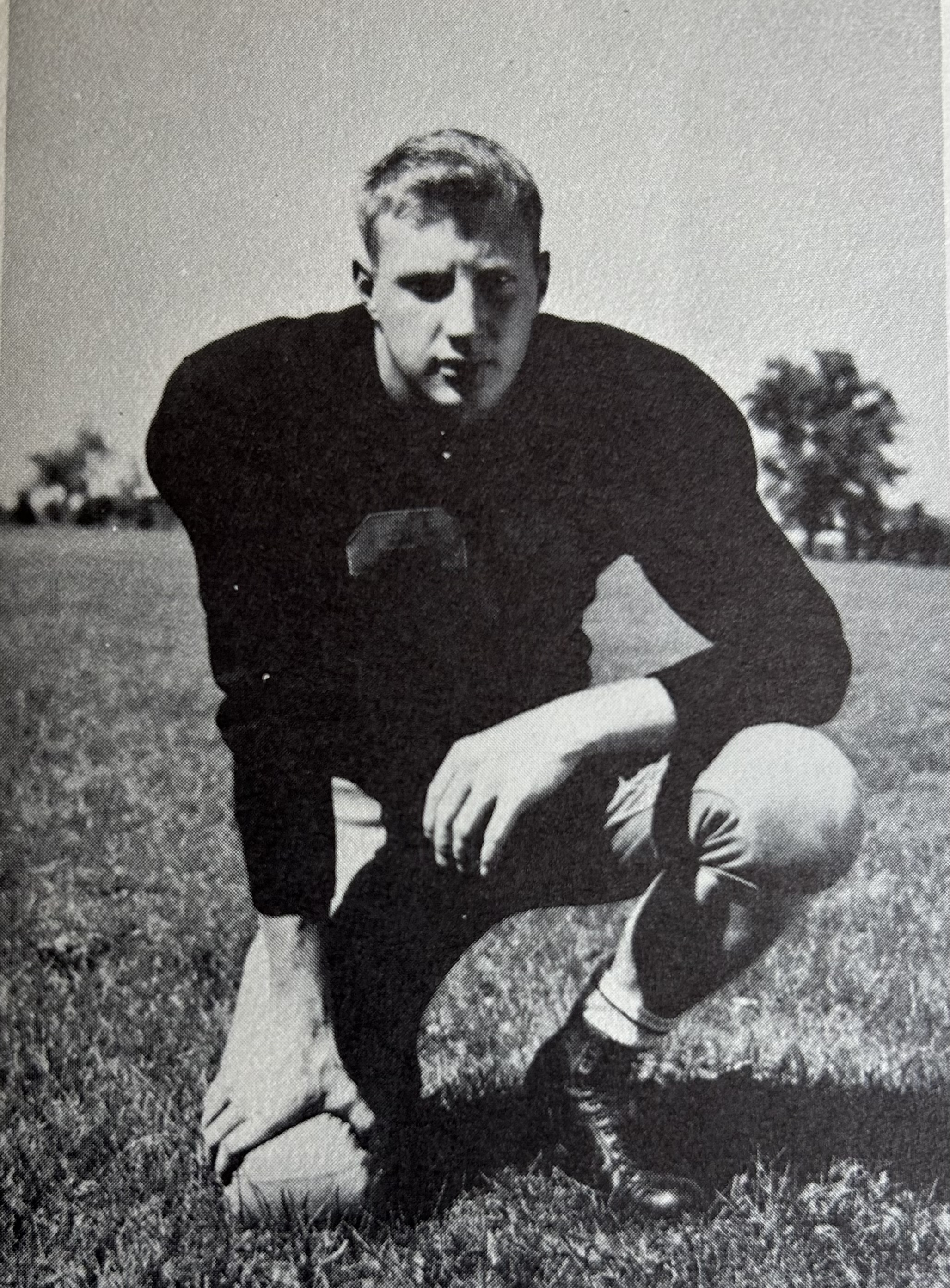
End Haldo Norman
