= 1950 Whitewater State Quakers football team =

American college football season

1950 Whitewater State Quakers football

WSTCC co-champion
- Conference: Wisconsin State Teachers College Conference
- Record: 6–0 (6–0 WSTCC)
- Head coach: Ed Schwager (6th season)
- Home stadium: Hamilton Field

1950 Wisconsin State Teachers College Conference football standings
| | Conf. | | | | | Overall |
| Team | W | | L | | T | W | | L | | T |
|---|---|---|---|---|---|---|---|---|---|---|
| La Crosse State + | 6 | – | 0 | – | 0 | 10 | – | 0 | – | 0 |
| Whitewater State + | 6 | – | 0 | – | 0 | 6 | – | 0 | – | 0 |
| Platteville State | 5 | – | 2 | – | 0 | 5 | – | 2 | – | 0 |
| Stout Institute | 3 | – | 2 | – | 1 | 5 | – | 2 | – | 1 |
| River Falls State | 2 | – | 3 | – | 1 | 3 | – | 3 | – | 2 |
| Milwaukee State | 2 | – | 3 | – | 1 | 3 | – | 4 | – | 1 |
| Stevens Point State | 2 | – | 4 | – | 0 | 3 | – | 4 | – | 1 |
| Superior State | 1 | – | 3 | – | 2 | 3 | – | 4 | – | 2 |
| Eau Claire State | 1 | – | 4 | – | 1 | 3 | – | 4 | – | 1 |
| Oshkosh State | 0 | – | 6 | – | 0 | 0 | – | 6 | – | 0 |
+ – Conference co-champions

The 1950 Whitewater State Quakers football team was an American football team that represented Whitewater State Teachers College (now known as the University of Wisconsin–Whitewater) as a member of the Wisconsin State Teachers College Conference (WSTCC) during the 1950 college football season. In their sixth year under head coach Ed Schwager, the Quakers compiled a perfect 6–0 record, was the WSTCC co-champion, and outscored opponents by a total of 158 to 25.

The team played its home games at Hamilton Field in Whitewater, Wisconsin.

== Schedule ==
| Date | Opponent | Site | Result | Source |
|---|---|---|---|---|
| September 30 | Platteville State | Hamilton Field; Whitewater, WI | W 13–7 | |
| October 9 | at Stevens Point State | Stevens Point, WI | W 26–12 | |
| October 14 | Milwaukee State | Hamilton Field; Whitewater, WI | W 33–6 | |
| October 20 | at Superior State | Hamilton Field; Superior, WI | W 28–0 | |
| October 28 | Eau Claire State | Hamilton Field; Whitewater, WI | W 17–0 | |
| November 4 | at Oshkosh State | Oshkosh, WI | W 41–0 | |
