= 1952 Abilene Christian Wildcats football team =

American college football season

1952 Abilene Christian Wildcats football

Texas Conference champion
- Conference: Texas Conference
- Record: 6–3–1 (4–0 Texas)
- Head coach: Garvin Beauchamp (3rd season)
- Captains: Wally Bullington; Don Smith
- Home stadium: Fair Park Stadium

1952 Texas Conference football standings
	Conf.					Overall
Team	W		L		T	W		L		T
Abilene Christian $	4	–	0	–	0	6	–	3	–	1
McMurry	3	–	1	–	0	4	–	4	–	1
Texas A&I	1	–	3	–	0	3	–	8	–	0
Howard Payne	1	–	3	–	0	3	–	6	–	0
Austin	1	–	3	–	0	2	–	7	–	0
$ – Conference champion

The 1952 Abilene Christian Wildcats football team represented Abilene Christian College—now known as Abilene Christian University—as a member of the Texas Conference during the 1952 college football season. Led by third-year head coach Garvin Beauchamp, the Wildcats compiled an overall record of 6–3–1 with a mark of 4–0 in conference play, winning the Texas Conference title for the third consecutive season.

== Schedule ==
Date	Time	Opponent	Site	Result	Attendance	Source
September 13		at Southwest Texas State*	Evans Field; San Marcos, TX	W 20–7		
September 19		East Texas State*	Fair Park Stadium; Abilene, TX	L 0–21	6,000	
September 26		at Chattanooga*	Chamberlain Field; Chattanooga, TN	L 0–28	8,000	
October 4		vs. Midwestern (TX)*	Stamford High School Stadium; Stamford, TX	W 21–0	3,000–4,000	
October 18	8:00 p.m.	at McMurry	Fair Park Stadium; Abilene, TX	W 26–0	8,000	
October 25		at West Texas State*	Buffalo Stadium; Canyon, TX	L 18–20	4,000	
November 1	2:00 p.m.	Texas A&I^{†}	Fair Park Stadium; Abilene, TX	W 48–13		
November 8	8:00 p.m.	at Austin	Sherman, TX	W 38–13		
November 15		at Fort Sam Houston*	Leonard Wood Field; San Antonio, TX	T 21–21	2,000	
November 27	2:00 p.m.	Howard Payne	Fair Park Stadium; Abilene, TX	W 62–6	2,500	
*Non-conference game; ^{†}Homecoming; All times are in Central time
