= Samuel D. Burton =

American football and basketball coach (1887–1933)

Biographical details
- Born: December 18, 1887; Weatherford, Oklahoma, U.S.
- Died: June 7, 1933 (aged 45); Canyon, Texas, U.S.

Playing career

Football
- 1910: Oklahoma
- 1912: Oklahoma

Coaching career (HC unless noted)

Football
- 1916–1917: Southwestern Normal (OK)
- 1921–1924: West Texas State
- 1931–1932: West Texas State

Basketball
- 1921–1933: West Texas State

Track
- ?–1933: West Texas State

Administrative career (AD unless noted)
- ?–1933: West Texas State

Head coaching record
- Overall: 26–37–4 (football); 210–42 (basketball)

Samuel David Burton (December 18, 1887 – June 7, 1933) was an American football and basketball coach. He served as the head football coach at Southwestern Oklahoma State University from 1916 to 1917 and at West Texas State Teachers College—now known as West Texas A&M University–from 1921 to 1924 and 1931 to 1932, compiling a career college football coaching record of 26–37–4. Burton was also the head basketball coach at West Texas State from 1921 to 1933, tallying mark of 210–42. He played college football at the University of Oklahoma in 1910 and 1912.

== Head coaching record ==
=== Football ===
Year	Team	Overall	Conference	Standing	Bowl/playoffs
Southwestern Normal Bulldogs (Oklahoma Intercollegiate Conference) (1916–1917)
1916	Southwestern Normal	2–7			
1917	Southwestern Normal	1–4			
Southwestern Normal:		3–11			
West Texas State Buffaloes (Independent) (1921)
1921	West Texas State	2–5–1			
West Texas State Buffaloes (Texas Intercollegiate Athletic Association) (1922–1924)
1922	West Texas State	2–8	0–2	T–9th	
1923	West Texas State	4–4–1	1–3	10th	
1924	West Texas State	5–4	2–2	T–6th	
West Texas State Buffaloes (Texas Intercollegiate Athletic Association) (1931–1932)
1931	West Texas State	6–3	2–2	T–3rd (Western)	
1932	West Texas State	4–2–2	3–0–1	T–2nd	
West Texas State:		23–26–4	8–9–1		
Total:		26–37–4			

=== Men's basketball ===
Record table
Season	Team	Overall	Conference	Standing	Postseason
West Texas State Buffaloes (Independent) (1921–1926)
1921–22	West Texas State	12–4			
1922–23	West Texas State	12–4			
1923–24	West Texas State	13–3			
1924–25	West Texas State	20–3			
1925–26	West Texas State	14–3			
West Texas State Buffaloes (Texas Intercollegiate Athletic Association) (1926–1932)
1926–27	West Texas State	23–3	9–1		
1927–28	West Texas State	19–4	9–1		
1928–29	West Texas State	21–5	7–3		
1929–30	West Texas State	17–4	9–1		
1930–31	West Texas State	18–2	8–1		
1931–32	West Texas State	20–3	6–0		AAU National Tournament
West Texas State Buffaloes (Independent) (1932–1933)
1932–33	West Texas State	19–4			
West Texas State:		208–42 (.832)	48–7 (.873)		
Total:		208–42 (.832)			
National champion Postseason invitational champion Conference regular season champion Conference regular season and conference tournament champion Division regular season champion Division regular season and conference tournament champion Conference tournament champion
