= 1951 Lamar Tech Cardinals football team =

American college football season

1951 Lamar Tech Cardinals football
- Conference: Lone Star Conference
- Record: 4–6 (2–3 LSC)
- Head coach: Stan Lambert (1st season)
- Home stadium: Greenie Stadium

1951 Lone Star Conference football standings
	Conf.					Overall
Team	W		L		T	W		L		T
East Texas State $	5	–	0	–	0	9	–	2	–	0
Southwest Texas State	2	–	2	–	1	6	–	3	–	1
Sam Houston State	2	–	2	–	1	4	–	4	–	1
Stephen F. Austin	2	–	3	–	0	4	–	4	–	1
Lamar Tech	2	–	3	–	0	4	–	6	–	0
Sul Ross	1	–	4	–	0	3	–	7	–	0
$ – Conference champion

The 1951 Lamar Tech Cardinals football team was an American football team that represented Lamar State College of Technology (now known as Lamar University) as a member of the Lone Star Conference (LSC) during the 1951 college football season. In their first year under head coach Stan Lambert, the Cardinals compiled an overall record of 4–6 with a mark of 2–3 in conference play, tying for fourth place in the LSC.

== Schedule ==
Date	Opponent	Site	Result	Attendance	Source
September 15	North Texas State*	Greenie Stadium; Beaumont, TX	L 6–54	5,400	
September 22	Southwestern Oklahoma State*	Greenie Stadium; Beaumont, TX	W 43–21		
September 29	at Northwestern State*	Demon Field; Natchitoches, LA	W 32–20		
October 6	Stephen F. Austin	Greenie Stadium; Beaumont, TX	W 26–14		
October 13	at East Texas State	Memorial Stadium; Commerce, TX	L 7–47		
October 20	at Sam Houston State	Pritchett Field; Huntsville, TX	L 14–33		
October 27	Trinity (TX)*	Greenie Stadium; Beaumont, TX	L 20–41		
November 3	Southwest Texas State	Greenie Stadium; Beaumont, TX	L 13–14		
November 10	at McNeese State*	Killen Field; Lake Charles, LA (rivalry)	L 7–13		
November 17	Sul Ross	Greenie Stadium; Beaumont, TX	W 28–27		
*Non-conference game
