= Les Cranfill =

American football, basketball, and baseball coach

Biographical details
- Born: May 18, 1899; Mitchell County, Texas, U.S.
- Died: July 29, 1983 (aged 84); Richardson, Texas, U.S.

Coaching career (HC unless noted)

Football
- 1924: Laneri HS (TX)
- 1925: TCU (freshmen)
- 1926: Simmons (TX) (backfield)
- 1930–1934: Simmons (TX) / Hardin–Simmons

Basketball
- 1930–1934: Simmons (TX) / Hardin–Simmons

Baseball
- 1927: Simmons (TX)

Head coaching record
- Overall: 21–22–4 (college football); 63–18 (college basketball); 10–5 (college baseball)

Accomplishments and honors

Championships
- Football; 1 Texas Conference (1931)

Leslie Willard Cranfill (May 18, 1899 – July 29, 1983) was an American football, basketball, and baseball coach. He served two stints as the head football coach at Hardin–Simmons University from 1930 to 1934, compiling a record of 21–22–4.

== Head coaching record ==
=== College football ===
Year	Team	Overall	Conference	Standing	Bowl/playoffs
Simmons/Hardin–Simmons Cowboys (Texas Conference) (1930–1934)
1930	Simmons	5–1–4	1–1–3	T–3rd	
1931	Simmons	6–5	4–1	T–1st	
1932	Simmons	4–5–1	1–2–1	T–3rd	
1933	Simmons	3–6–1	1–2–1	6th	
1934	Hardin–Simmons	3–5–2	2–2–1	5th	
Simmons / Hardin–Simmons:		21–22–4	9–8–6		
Total:		21–22–4			
National championship Conference title Conference division title or championship game berth
