= 1950 La Crosse State Indians football team =

American college football season

1950 La Crosse State Indians football

WSTCC co-champion

Cigar Bowl, W 47–14 vs. Valparaiso
- Conference: Wisconsin State Teachers College Conference
- Record: 10–0 (6–0 WSTCC)
- Head coach: Clark Van Galder (3rd season)
- Home stadium: Memorial Field

1950 Wisconsin State Teachers College Conference football standings
	Conf.					Overall
Team	W		L		T	W		L		T
La Crosse State +	6	–	0	–	0	10	–	0	–	0
Whitewater State +	6	–	0	–	0	6	–	0	–	0
Platteville State	5	–	2	–	0	5	–	2	–	0
Stout Institute	3	–	2	–	1	5	–	2	–	1
River Falls State	2	–	3	–	1	3	–	3	–	2
Milwaukee State	2	–	3	–	1	3	–	4	–	1
Stevens Point State	2	–	4	–	0	3	–	4	–	1
Superior State	1	–	3	–	2	3	–	4	–	2
Eau Claire State	1	–	4	–	1	3	–	4	–	1
Oshkosh State	0	–	6	–	0	0	–	6	–	0
+ – Conference co-champions

The 1950 La Crosse State Indians football team was an American football team that represented the University of Wisconsin–La Crosse as a member of the Wisconsin State Teachers College Conference (WSTCC) during the 1950 college football season. In their third season under head coach Clark Van Galder, the Indians compiled a perfect 10–0 record (6–0 against WSTCC opponents), outscored opponents by a total of 388 to 76, and won the WSTCC championship.

The team played its home games at Memorial Field in La Crosse, Wisconsin.

== Schedule ==
Date	Opponent	Site	Result	Attendance	Source
September 15	at Wartburg*	Waverly, IA	W 31–0		
September 21	Luther*	Memorial Field; La Crosse, WI	W 41–0		
September 29	Stevens Point State	Memorial Field; La Crosse, WI	W 29–13		
October 7	at River Falls State	River Falls, WI	W 19–0		
October 14	at Oshkosh State	Oshkosh, WI	W 56–6		
October 21	Stout Institute	Memorial Field; La Crosse, WI	W 33–18		
October 28	Superior State	Memorial Field; La Crosse, WI	W 72–0	6,000	
November 4	at Eau Claire State	Eau Claire, WI	W 40–12		
November 11	Gustavus Adolphus*	Memorial Field; La Crosse, WI	W 20–13	8,000	
January 1, 1951	vs. Valparaiso*	Phillips Field; Tampa, FL (Cigar Bowl)	W 47–14	12,000–12,500	
*Non-conference game
