= Bo Atterberry =

American football coach (born 1975)

Current position
- Title: Head coach
- Team: Southeastern Oklahoma State
- Conference: GAC
- Record: 48–41

Biographical details
- Born: February 21, 1975 (age 51)

Coaching career (HC unless noted)
- 2003: Southeastern Oklahoma State (DB)
- 2004–2006: Southeastern Oklahoma State (DC)
- 2007–2012: Texas A&M–Kingsville
- 2013: Southeastern Oklahoma State (AHC/DC)
- 2014–2018: Southeastern Oklahoma State
- 2019 (spring): Arkansas Tech
- 2021–2022: Paris HS (TX) (DC)
- 2023–present: Southeastern Oklahoma State

Head coaching record
- Overall: 89–69
- Bowls: 0–2
- Tournaments: 0–2 (NCAA D-II playoffs)

Accomplishments and honors

Championships
- 1 LSC (2009); 1 LSC South Division (2009)

Bo Atterberry (born February 21, 1975) is an American college football coach. He is the head football coach for Southeastern Oklahoma State University, a position he has held since 2023. This is his second stint with the school with his first being from 2013 to 2018. He served as the head football coach at Texas A&M University–Kingsville from 2007 to 2012. Atterberry was named the head football coach at Arkansas Tech University in December 2018, but stepped down from that post in March 2019 because of health reasons.

After taking over the Texas A&M–Kingsville Javelinas program in 2007, he compiled a 41–28 record over his tenure while guiding Texas A&M–Kingsville to a Lone Star Conference (LSC) championship in 2009 and back-to-back NCAA Division II playoff appearances. Atterberry earned LSC Coach of the Year honors in 2012, as well as AFCA Regional Coach of the Year honors in 2010, and was a finalist for the Liberty Mutual National Coach of the Year in 2009. Over his tenure he coached 22 first team All-LSC selections, 16 all-region honorees and 11 All-Americans. On December 4, 2013, Atterberry was introduced as the 19th head football coach in Southeastern Oklahoma State's history. Atterberry led the 2014 Southeastern team to their first winning season since 2009 in his first year as head coach.

== Head coaching record ==
Year	Team	Overall	Conference	Standing	Bowl/playoffs
Texas A&M–Kingsville Javelinas (Lone Star Conference) (2007–2012)
2007	Texas A&M–Kingsville	3–8	3–6 / 2–4	11th / 5th (South)	
2008	Texas A&M–Kingsville	7–4	6–3 / 3–3	T–3rd / T–3rd (South)	
2009	Texas A&M–Kingsville	9–3	7–2 / 4–2	T–1st / T–1st (South)	L NCAA Division II First Round
2010	Texas A&M–Kingsville	10–2	9–1 / 5–1	2nd / 2nd (South)	L NCAA Division II Second Round
2011	Texas A&M–Kingsville	6–5	4–4	5th	
2012	Texas A&M–Kingsville	6–6	5–3	T–3rd	L Kanza
Texas A&M–Kingsville:		41–28	34–19		
Southeastern Oklahoma State Savage Storm (Great American Conference) (2014–2018)
2014	Southeastern Oklahoma State	7–5	6–4	T–4th	L Live United
2015	Southeastern Oklahoma State	6–5	6–5	T–7th	
2016	Southeastern Oklahoma State	7–4	7–4	T–4th	
2017	Southeastern Oklahoma State	7–4	7–4	T–4th	
2018	Southeastern Oklahoma State	6–5	6–5	T–4th	
Southeastern Oklahoma State Savage Storm (Great American Conference) (2023–present)
2023	Southeastern Oklahoma State	5–6	5–6	T–7th	
2024	Southeastern Oklahoma State	5–6	5–6	T–5th	
2025	Southeastern Oklahoma State	5–6	5–6	8th	
2026	Southeastern Oklahoma State	0–0	0–0		
Southeastern Oklahoma State:		48–41	47–40		
Total:		89–69			
National championship Conference title Conference division title or championship game berth
