= 1951 Stephen F. Austin Lumberjacks football team =

American college football season

1951 Stephen F. Austin Lumberjacks football
- Conference: Lone Star Conference
- Record: 4–4–1 (2–3 LSC)
- Head coach: Ted Jefferies (5th season)
- Home stadium: Memorial Stadium

1951 Lone Star Conference football standings
	Conf.					Overall
Team	W		L		T	W		L		T
East Texas State $	5	–	0	–	0	9	–	2	–	0
Southwest Texas State	2	–	2	–	1	6	–	3	–	1
Sam Houston State	2	–	2	–	1	4	–	4	–	1
Stephen F. Austin	2	–	3	–	0	4	–	4	–	1
Lamar Tech	2	–	3	–	0	4	–	6	–	0
Sul Ross	1	–	4	–	0	3	–	7	–	0
$ – Conference champion

The 1951 Stephen F. Austin Lumberjacks football team represented Stephen F. Austin State College—now known as Stephen F. Austin State University—as a member of the Lone Star Conference (LSC) during the 1951 college football season. Led by fifth-year head coach Ted Jefferies, the Lumberjacks compiled an overall record of 4–4–1 with a mark of 2–3 in conference play, tying for fourth place in the LSC.

== Schedule ==
Date	Opponent	Site	Result	Attendance	Source
September 22	New Mexico A&M*	Memorial Stadium; Las Cruces, NM	W 27–7	5,000	
September 29	McNeese State*	Memorial Stadium; Nacogdoches, TX	T 14–14	5,000	
October 6	at Lamar Tech	Greenie Stadium; Beaumont, TX	L 41–26		
October 13	at Southeastern Louisiana*	Strawberry Stadium; Hammond, LA	W 14–6		
October 20	Southwest Texas State	Memorial Stadium; Nacogdoches, TX	W 27–20		
October 27	Southwestern Louisiana*	Memorial Stadium; Nacogdoches, TX	L 14–32		
November 3	at Sul Ross	Jackson Field; Alpine, TX	L 19–34		
November 10	at East Texas State	Memorial Stadium; Commerce, TX	L 19–21		
November 19	Sam Houston State	Memorial Stadium; Nacogdoches, TX (rivalry)	W 14–0	6,000	
*Non-conference game
