= 1951 East Texas State Lions football team =

American college football season

1951 East Texas State Lions football

LSC champion
- Conference: Lone Star Conference
- Record: 9–2 (5–0 LSC)
- Head coach: Milburn Smith (1st season)
- Home stadium: Memorial Stadium

1951 Lone Star Conference football standings
	Conf.					Overall
Team	W		L		T	W		L		T
East Texas State $	5	–	0	–	0	9	–	2	–	0
Southwest Texas State	2	–	2	–	1	6	–	3	–	1
Sam Houston State	2	–	2	–	1	4	–	4	–	1
Stephen F. Austin	2	–	3	–	0	4	–	4	–	1
Lamar Tech	2	–	3	–	0	4	–	6	–	0
Sul Ross	1	–	4	–	0	3	–	7	–	0
$ – Conference champion

The 1951 East Texas State Lions football team represented East Texas State Teachers College—now known as East Texas A&M University–as a member of the Lone Star Conference (LSC) during the 1951 college football season. Led by first-year head coach Milburn Smith, the Lions compiled an overall record of 9–2 with a mark of 5–0 in conference play, winning the LSC title.

== Schedule ==
Date	Opponent	Site	Result	Attendance	Source
September 22	Abilene Christian*	Memorial Stadium; Commerce, TX	L 6–14	7,000	
September 29	at Louisiana Tech*	Tech Stadium; Ruston, LA	W 27–7		
October 5	at Southwestern Louisiana*	Eagle Field; Denton, TX	L 7–48	7,500	
October 13	Lamar Tech	Memorial Stadium; Commerce, TX	W 47–7		
October 20	Midwestern (TX)*	Memorial Stadium; Commerce, TX	W 46–26	3,500	
October 27	at Sam Houston State	Pritchett Field; Huntsville, TX	W 53–21		
November 3	at Howard Payne*	Brownwood, TX	W 38–21		
November 10	Stephen F. Austin	Memorial Stadium; Commerce, TX	W 21–19		
November 17	at Southwest Texas State	Evans Field; San Marcos, TX	W 28–21		
November 24	at Austin*	Sherman High School field; Sherman, TX	W 12–7		
December 1	at Sul Ross	Jackson Field; Alpine, TX	W 47–21		
*Non-conference game
