= 1951 Sam Houston State Bearkats football team =

American college football season

1951 Sam Houston State Bearkats football
- Conference: Lone Star Conference
- Record: 4–4–1 (2–2–1 LSC)
- Head coach: Puny Wilson (11th season)
- Home stadium: Pritchett Field

1951 Lone Star Conference football standings
	Conf.					Overall
Team	W		L		T	W		L		T
East Texas State $	5	–	0	–	0	9	–	2	–	0
Southwest Texas State	2	–	2	–	1	6	–	3	–	1
Sam Houston State	2	–	2	–	1	4	–	4	–	1
Stephen F. Austin	2	–	3	–	0	4	–	4	–	1
Lamar Tech	2	–	3	–	0	4	–	6	–	0
Sul Ross	1	–	4	–	0	3	–	7	–	0
$ – Conference champion

The 1951 Sam Houston State Bearkats football team represented Sam Houston State Teachers College (now known as Sam Houston State University) as a member of the Lone Star Conference (LSC) during the 1951 college football season. Led by eleventh-year head coach Puny Wilson, the Bearkats compiled an overall record of 4–4–1 with a mark of 2–2–1 in conference play, and finished tied for second in the LSC.

== Schedule ==
Date	Opponent	Site	Result	Attendance	Source
September 15	at Louisiana College*	Alumni Field; Pineville, LA	L 6–12	5,000	
September 21	at Brooke Army Medical Center*	San Antonio, TX	L 21–54		
September 29	Howard Payne*	Pritchett Field; Huntsville, TX	W 27–19		
October 6	Sul Ross	Pritchett Field; Huntsville, TX	W 28–21		
October 20	Lamar Tech	Pritchett Field; Huntsville, TX	W 33–14		
October 27	East Texas State	Pritchett Field; Huntsville, TX	L 21–53		
November 3	McNeese State*	Pritchett Field; Huntsville, TX	W 20–13	2,500	
November 10	at Southwest Texas State	Evans Field; San Marcos, TX	T 20–20		
November 17	at Stephen F. Austin	Memorial Stadium; Nacogdoches, TX (rivalry)	L 0–14	6,000	
*Non-conference game
