= Ted Jefferies =

American football player and coach (1908–1985)

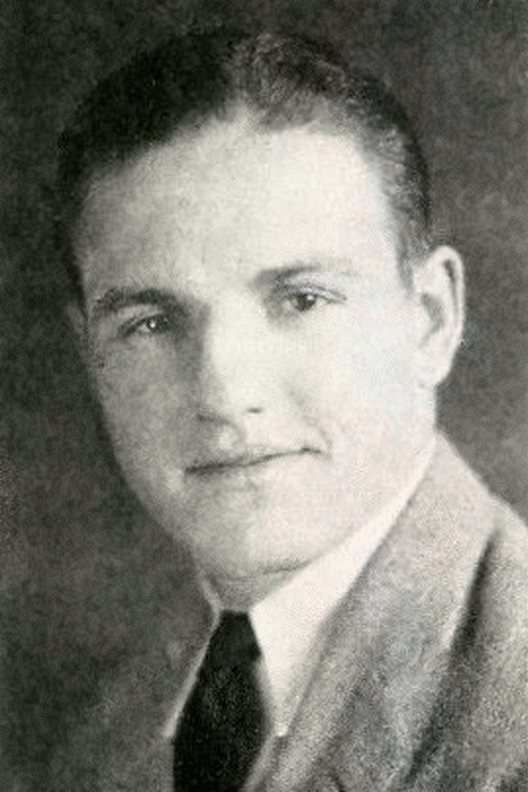
- Jeffries pictured in Yoncopin 1929, Centenary yearbook

Biographical details
- Born: November 8, 1908; Jacksonville, Texas, U.S.
- Died: January 2, 1985 (aged 76); Nacogdoches, Texas, U.S.
- Education: Centenary College of Louisiana (1929)

Playing career
- 1925–1928: Centenary

Coaching career (HC unless noted)
- 1933–1943: Wichita Falls HS (TX)
- 1946: Lamar
- 1947–1955: Stephen F. Austin

Administrative career (AD unless noted)
- 1947–1956: Stephen F. Austin

Head coaching record
- Overall: 41–40–3 (college); 83–33–8 (high school)

Theodore Lemuel Jefferies (November 8, 1908 – January 2, 1985) was an American football player and coach. Jefferies was an alumnus of the Centenary College of Louisiana, which he graduated from in 1929, as president of the student body and as "candidate for a B.S. degree. He served as head coach at Wichita Falls High School from 1933 to 1943, taking the school to its first state championship in 1941. Jefferies later coached at Lamar University, at a time when the school was still a junior college. In 1947, he became head coach at Stephen F. Austin University in Nacogdoches, Texas.

Among his former players was later Houston Oilers and New Orleans Saints coach Bum Phillips and Texas A&M University coach R. C. Slocum. Slocum played for Jefferies at Stark High School in Orange, Texas. Mr. Ted, as he was called, came out of retirement to coach in Orange. In Slocum's senior season, 1962, Jefferies took Orange to the state semifinals.

== Head coaching record ==
=== College ===
Year	Team	Overall	Conference	Standing	Bowl/playoffs
Stephen F. Austin Lumberjacks (Lone Star Conference) (1947–1955)
1947	Stephen F. Austin	3–6–1	2–3–1	5th	
1948	Stephen F. Austin	7–2–1	3–2–1	3rd	
1949	Stephen F. Austin	7–2	2–1	2nd	
1950	Stephen F. Austin	5–5	2–2	T–2nd	
1951	Stephen F. Austin	4–4–1	2–3	T–4th	
1952	Stephen F. Austin	3–6	1–4	T–4th	
1953	Stephen F. Austin	1–8	0–5	6th	
1954	Stephen F. Austin	6–3	3–3	T–3rd	
1955	Stephen F. Austin	5–4	2–4	T–4th	
Stephen F. Austin:		41–40–3	17–27–2		
Total:		41–40–3			
