= Ed Schwager =

American football player, coach, and administrator (1909–1992)

Biographical details
- Born: December 3, 1909
- Died: April 25, 1992 (aged 82)

Coaching career (HC unless noted)

Football
- 1942: Whitewater State
- 1946–1955: Whitewater State

Basketball
- 1942–1944: Whitewater State
- 1946–1948: Whitewater State

Baseball
- 1955–1959: Whitewater State

Track
- 1946–1953: Whitewater State

Administrative career (AD unless noted)
- 1942–1971: Whitewater State

Head coaching record
- Overall: 22–44–4 (football); 19–22 (basketball); 31–20 (baseball)

Accomplishments and honors

Championships
- Football; 1 WSCC (1950)

Edgar Howard Schwager (December 3, 1909 – April 25, 1992) was an American football player and coach and college athletics administrator. He was a star athlete at Whitewater State Teachers College, competing in basketball, football, and track and field. He led the basketball team in scoring three years in a row and was captain of Whitewater's 1929–30 basketball team. He was the head coach for the Whitewater football team in 1942 and from 1946 to 1955. He also served as the school's basketball coach from 1942 to 1944 and 1946 to 1948, baseball coach from 1955 to 1959, track coach from 1946 to 1953, and athletic director from 1942 to 1971. Prior to 1942, he had been a coach at Dodgeville and Oconomowoc High Schools. He served in the United States Navy during World War II. He died in 1992 and was posthumously inducted into the Wisconsin Intercollegiate Athletic Conference Hall of Fame in 2015.

== Head coaching record ==
=== Football ===
Year	Team	Overall	Conference	Standing	Bowl/playoffs
Whitewater State Quakers (Wisconsin State College Conference) (1942)
1942	Whitewater State	2–4	2–2	3rd (Southern)	
Whitewater State Quakers (Wisconsin State College Conference) (1946–1955)
1946	Whitewater State	0–6	0–4	5th (Southern)	
1947	Whitewater State	2–3–1	1–2–1	T–3rd (Southern)	
1948	Whitewater State	2–5–1	1–4–1	T–8th	
1949	Whitewater State	2–4–1	2–3–1	T–6th	
1950	Whitewater State	6–0	6–0	T–1st	
1951	Whitewater State	3–3	3–2	3rd	
1952	Whitewater State	2–4	1–3	7th	
1953	Whitewater State	2–4	2–3	T–6th	
1954	Whitewater State	0–7	0–5	T–9th	
1955	Whitewater State	1–4–1	1–3–1	7th	
Whitewater State:		22–44–4	19–32–4		
Total:		22–44–4			
National championship Conference title Conference division title or championship game berth
