= 1932 Simmons Cowboys football team =

American college football season

1932 Simmons Cowboys football
- Conference: Texas Conference
- Record: 4–5–1 (1–2–1 Texas)
- Head coach: Les Cranfill (3rd season)
- Captain: Harold Fitzgerald
- Home stadium: Parramore Field

1932 Texas Conference football standings
	Conf.					Overall
Team	W		L		T	W		L		T
Howard Payne $	4	–	0	–	0	7	–	1	–	0
Southwestern (TX)	3	–	1	–	0	3	–	3	–	3
Simmons (TX)	1	–	2	–	1	4	–	5	–	1
St. Edward's	1	–	2	–	1	3	–	5	–	2
Austin	0	–	4	–	0	0	–	9	–	0
$ – Conference champion

The 1932 Simmons Cowboys football team represented Simmons University—now known as Hardin–Simmons University—as a member of the Texas Conference during 1932 college football season. Led by Les Cranfill in his third season as head coach, the team went 4–5–1 overall, tying for third place in the Texas Conference with a mark of 1–2–1.

== Schedule ==
Date	Time	Opponent	Site	Result	Attendance	Source
September 23	8:00 p.m.	at West Texas State*	Buffalo Stadium; Canyon, TX	W 6–0		
September 29		at Jefferson (TX)*	Fair Park Stadium; Dallas, TX	L 0–20	5,000	
October 7		St. Edward's	Parramore Field; Abilene, TX	T 0–0		
October 14		at Texas Mines*	El Paso High School Stadium; El Paso, TX	L 2–13	4,000–5,000	
October 21		Trinity (TX)	Parramore Field; Abilene, TX	W 7–0		
October 28		at Southwestern (TX)	Snyder Field; Georgetown, TX	L 7–16		
November 4	8:00 p.m.	TCU*	Parramore Field; Abilene, TX	L 0–27	1,000	
November 11	7:45 p.m.	Howard Payne	Parramore Field; Abilene, TX	L 0–13		
November 18		at Austin	Sherman, TX	W 16–0		
November 24		at Texas Tech*	Tech Field; Lubbock, TX	W 13–12	4,000	
*Non-conference game; All times are in Central time
