= 1934 Howard Payne Yellow Jackets football team =

American college football season

1934 Howard Payne Yellow Jackets football

Texas Conference champion
- Conference: Texas Conference
- Record: 9–0–1 (5–0–1 Texas)
- Head coach: Joe Bailey Cheaney (7th season)
- Captains: Ray Taylor; Bob Sikes (co-captain)
- Home stadium: Howard Payne Field

1934 Texas Conference football standings
	Conf.					Overall
Team	W		L		T	W		L		T
Howard Payne $	5	–	0	–	1	9	–	0	–	1
St. Edward's	2	–	1	–	2	2	–	4	–	2
Daniel Baker	2	–	1	–	2	3	–	5	–	3
McMurry	2	–	1	–	3	3	–	3	–	3
Hardin–Simmons	2	–	2	–	1	3	–	5	–	2
Austin	2	–	4	–	2	3	–	5	–	2
Southwestern (TX)	2	–	4	–	1	3	–	5	–	2
Trinity (TX)	1	–	3	–	1	2	–	6	–	1
Abilene Christian	1	–	3	–	1	1	–	7	–	2
$ – Conference champion

The 1934 Howard Payne Yellow Jackets represented Howard Payne College—now known as Howard Payne University—as a member of the Texas Conference during the 1934 college football season. Led by seventh-year head coach Joe Bailey Cheaney, the Yellow Jackets compiled an overall record of 9–0–1 with a mark of 5–0–1 in conference play, winning the Texas Conference title for the sixth time in seven seasons.

== Schedule ==
Date	Time	Opponent	Site	Result	Attendance	Source
September 28		at Southwest Texas State*	Evans Field; San Marcos, TX	W 4–0		
October 5		Trinity (TX)	Brownwood, TX	W 28–0	3,000	
October 12		Texas Military College*	Brownwood, TX	W 20–0		
October 19		at Austin	Sherman, TX	T 7–7		
October 26	3:00 p.m.	at McMurry	Donaldson Field; Abilene, TX	W 13–7		
November 2		Abilene Christian	Brownwood, TX	W 12–0		
November 9		St. Edward's	Brownwood, TX	W 19–6		
November 17		Schreiner*	Howard Payne Field; Brownwood, TX	W 19–3		
November 22		Westmoreland*	Brownwood, TX	W 21–0 or 21–6		
November 29	2:30 p.m.	Southwestern (TX)^{†}	Brownwood, TX	W 14–0		
*Non-conference game; ^{†}Homecoming; All times are in Central time
