= 1950 Abilene Christian Wildcats football team =

American college football season

1950 Abilene Christian Wildcats football

Texas Conference champion Refrigerator Bowl champion

Refrigerator Bowl, W 13–7 vs. Gustavus Adolphus
- Conference: Texas Conference
- Record: 11–0 (4–0 Texas)
- Head coach: Garvin Beauchamp (1st season)
- Captains: Pete Ragus; Alton Green
- Home stadium: Fair Park Stadium

1950 Texas Conference football standings
	Conf.					Overall
Team	W		L		T	W		L		T
Abilene Christian $	5	–	0	–	0	11	–	0	–	0
Texas A&I	4	–	1	–	0	6	–	3	–	0
Southwestern (TX)	2	–	3	–	0	5	–	5	–	0
Howard Payne	2	–	3	–	0	4	–	5	–	1
McMurry	2	–	3	–	0	4	–	5	–	0
Austin	0	–	5	–	0	2	–	7	–	0
$ – Conference champion

The 1950 Abilene Christian Wildcats football team represented Abilene Christian College—now known as Abilene Christian University—as a member of the Texas Conference during the 1950 college football season. Led by first-year head coach Garvin Beauchamp, the Wildcats compiled an overall record of 11–0 with a mark of 5–0 in conference play, winning the Texas Conference title. Abilene Christian was invited to the Refrigerator Bowl, where the Wildcats defeated Gustavus Adolphus. The team played home games at Fair Park Stadium in Abilene, Texas.

== Schedule ==
Date	Time	Opponent	Site	Result	Attendance	Source
September 16	8:00 p.m.	Eastern New Mexico*	Fair Park Stadium; Abilene, TX	W 39–0	3,000	
September 23		vs. Sul Ross*	Midland, TX	W 34–0		
September 29		at Chattanooga*	Chamberlain Field; Chattanooga, TN	W 13–7	10,000	
October 7	2:30 p.m.	at Southwestern (TX)	Georgetown, TX	W 7–6	4,000	
October 14	8:00 p.m.	East Texas State*	Stamford High School Stadium; Stamford, TX	W 19–0	4,000	
October 21	8:00 p.m.	McMurry	Fair Park Stadium; Abilene, TX	W 26–14	11,000	
October 28	2:15 p.m.	at Midwestern (TX)*	Coyote Stadium; Wichita Falls, TX	W 13–0	11,000	
November 4	8:00 p.m.	Texas A&I	Fair Park Stadium; Abilene, TX	W 20–3		
November 11	8:30 p.m.	at Austin	Sherman, TX	W 20–3		
November 23	2:00 p.m.	Howard Payne	Fair Park Stadium; Abilene, TX	W 27–6	8,000	
December 2	8:00 p.m.	vs. Gustavus Adolphus*	Reitz Bowl; Evansville, IN (Refrigerator Bowl)	W 13–7	7,500–8,000	
*Non-conference game; All times are in Central time
