= 1951 Texas A&I Javelinas football team =

American college football season

1951 Texas A&I Javelinas football

Texas Conference co-champion
- Conference: Texas Conference
- Record: 5–4 (3–1 Texas)
- Head coach: Dewey Mayhew (6th season)
- Captains: A. J. Boese; Earl Turner
- Home stadium: Javelina Stadium

1951 Texas Conference football standings
	Conf.					Overall
Team	W		L		T	W		L		T
Abilene Christian +	3	–	1	–	0	6	–	4	–	0
Texas A&I +	3	–	1	–	0	5	–	4	–	0
Howard Payne +	3	–	1	–	0	4	–	4	–	0
McMurry	1	–	3	–	0	3	–	7	–	0
Austin	0	–	4	–	0	2	–	7	–	0
+ – Conference co-champions

The 1951 Texas A&I Javelinas football team represented the Texas College of Arts and Industries—now known as Texas A&M University–Kingsville—as a member of the Texas Conference during the 1951 college football season. Led by sixth-year head coach Dewey Mayhew, the Javelinas compiled an overall record of 5–4 with a mark of 3–1 in conference play, sharing the Texas Conference title with Abilene Christian and Howard Payne.

== Schedule ==
Date	Time	Opponent	Site	Result	Attendance	Source
September 17		Texas Lutheran*	Javelina Stadium; Kingsville, TX	W 37–7		
September 22		at Trinity (TX)*	Alamo Stadium; San Antonio, TX	L 7–34		
September 29		at Southwest Texas State*	Evans Field; San Marcos, TX	L 6–41		
October 6		Howard Payne	Javelina Stadium; Kingsville, TX	L 7–9		
October 13	8:00 p.m.	at McMurry	Indiana Stadium; Abilene, TX	W 20–14		
October 27		at Sul Ross*	Jackson Field; Alpine, TX	W 33–14	6,000	
November 3		Abilene Christian	Javelina Stadium; Kingsville, TX	W 14–13	4,000	
November 10	8:00 p.m.	Carswell Air Force Base*	Javelina Stadium; Kingsville, TX	L 0–40		
December 1		Austin^{†}	Javelina Stadium; Kingsville, TX	W 41–7		
*Non-conference game; ^{†}Homecoming; All times are in Central time
