= 1932 Howard Payne Yellow Jackets football team =

American college football season

1932 Howard Payne Yellow Jackets football

Texas Conference champion
- Conference: Texas Conference
- Record: 7–1 (4–0 Texas)
- Head coach: Joe Bailey Cheaney (5th season)

1932 Texas Conference football standings
	Conf.					Overall
Team	W		L		T	W		L		T
Howard Payne $	4	–	0	–	0	7	–	1	–	0
Southwestern (TX)	3	–	1	–	0	3	–	3	–	3
Simmons (TX)	1	–	2	–	1	4	–	5	–	1
St. Edward's	1	–	2	–	1	3	–	5	–	2
Austin	0	–	4	–	0	0	–	9	–	0
$ – Conference champion

The 1932 Howard Payne Yellow Jackets represented Howard Payne College (now known as Howard Payne University) as a member of the Texas Conference during the 1932 college football season. Led by fifth-year head coach Joe Bailey Cheaney, the Yellow Jackets compiled an overall record of 7–1 with a mark of 4–0 in conference play, and won the Texas Conference title for the fifth consecutive season.

== Schedule ==
Date	Time	Opponent	Site	Result	Attendance	Source
September 30		at Southwest Texas State*	Evans Field; San Marcos, TX	W 15–6		
October 7		at Texas Mines*	El Paso High School Stadium; El Paso, TX	L 6–19	2,500	
October 14		at Austin	Sherman, TX	W 47–13		
October 28		at Trinity (TX)*	Waxahachie, TX	W 13–0		
November 4		Abilene Christian*	Brownwood, TX	W 6–0		
November 11	7:45 p.m.	at Simmons (TX)	Parramore Field; Abilene, TX	W 13–0		
November 18		St. Edward's	Brownwood, TX	W 14–0		
November 24		Southwestern (TX)	Brownwood, TX	W 6–0		
*Non-conference game; All times are in Central time
