= 1951 Abilene Christian Wildcats football team =

American college football season

1951 Abilene Christian Wildcats football

Texas Conference co-champion
- Conference: Texas Conference
- Record: 6–4 (3–1 Texas)
- Head coach: Garvin Beauchamp (2nd season)
- Captains: Les Wheeler; Jerry Mullins
- Home stadium: Fair Park Stadium

1951 Texas Conference football standings
	Conf.					Overall
Team	W		L		T	W		L		T
Abilene Christian +	3	–	1	–	0	6	–	4	–	0
Texas A&I +	3	–	1	–	0	5	–	4	–	0
Howard Payne +	3	–	1	–	0	4	–	4	–	0
McMurry	1	–	3	–	0	3	–	7	–	0
Austin	0	–	4	–	0	2	–	7	–	0
+ – Conference co-champions

The 1951 Abilene Christian Wildcats football team represented Abilene Christian College—now known as Abilene Christian University—as a member of the Texas Conference during the 1951 college football season. Led by second-year head coach Garvin Beauchamp, the Wildcats compiled an overall record of 6–4 with a mark of 3–1 in conference play, sharing the Texas Conference title with Howard Payne and Texas A&I.

== Schedule ==
Date	Time	Opponent	Site	Result	Attendance	Source
September 14		at Drake*	Drake Stadium; Des Moines, IA	L 7–19	8,000	
September 22		at East Texas State*	Memorial Stadium; Commerce, TX	W 14–6	7,000	
September 28		at Chattanooga*	Chamberlain Field; Chattanooga, TN	L 7–33		
October 6		vs. Texas Western*	Midland Memorial Stadium; Midland, TX	W 20–13	5,000	
October 11		Carswell Air Force Base*	Fair Park Stadium; Abilene, TX	L 18–47		
October 20	8:00 p.m.	McMurry	Fair Park Stadium; Abilene, TX	W 58–13		
October 27	2:15 p.m.	at Midwestern (TX)*	Coyote Stadium; Wichita Falls, TX	W 21–13	6,000	
November 3		at Texas A&I	Javelina Stadium; Kingsville, TX	L 13–14	4,000	
November 10	2:00 p.m.	Austin^{†}	Fair Park Stadium; Abilene, TX	W 50–33	5,000	
November 22	2:00 p.m.	at Howard Payne	Lion Stadium; Brownwood, TX	W 34–14	6,500	
*Non-conference game; ^{†}Homecoming; All times are in Central time
