= Fred Jonas =

American football coach

Playing career
- 1955–1956: Hardin–Simmons

Coaching career (HC unless noted)
- 1958–1960: Lamesa HS (TX) (assistant)
- 1961–1965: Roy Miller HS (TX) (assistant)
- 1966: Richard King HS (TX)
- 1967–1968: Texas A&I (backfield)
- 1969–1976: Texas A&I (DC)
- 1977–1978: Texas A&I

Head coaching record
- Overall: 14–6–1 (college)

Accomplishments and honors

Championships
- 1 LSC (1977)

Fred Jonas is an American former football coach. He served as head football coach at Texas A&I University—now known as Texas A&M University–Kingsville—from 1977 to 1978, compiling a record of 14–6–1. Jonas was an assistant at Texas A&I for ten seasons under head coach Gil Steinke, during which time the Javelinas won five NAIA Football National Championships.

Jonas played college football at Hardin–Simmons University Abilene, Texas. He began his coaching career as an assistant at Lamesa High School in Lamesa, Texas from 1958 to 1960 and Roy Miller High School in Corpus Christi, Texas from 1961 to 1965. Jonas spent one year, in 1966, as the head football coach at Richard King High School in Corpus Christi before he was hired at Texas A&I in 1967. He resigned after two season at head coach at Texas A&I to enter private business in the Houston area.

== Head coaching record ==
=== College ===
Year	Team	Overall	Conference	Standing	Bowl/playoffs
Texas A&I Javelinas (Lone Star Conference) (1977–1978)
1977	Texas A&I	8–1–1	5–1–1	T–1st	
1978	Texas A&I	6–5	4–3	T–3rd	
Texas A&I:		14–6–1	9–4–1		
Total:		14–6–1			
National championship Conference title Conference division title or championship game berth
