= 1951 Howard Payne Yellow Jackets football team =

American college football season

1951 Howard Payne Yellow Jackets football

Texas Conference co-champion
- Conference: Texas Conference
- Record: 4–4 (3–1 Texas)
- Head coach: Carl Anderson (1st season)
- Home stadium: Lion Stadium

1951 Texas Conference football standings
| | Conf. | | | | | Overall |
| Team | W | | L | | T | W | | L | | T |
|---|---|---|---|---|---|---|---|---|---|---|
| Abilene Christian + | 3 | – | 1 | – | 0 | 6 | – | 4 | – | 0 |
| Texas A&I + | 3 | – | 1 | – | 0 | 5 | – | 4 | – | 0 |
| Howard Payne + | 3 | – | 1 | – | 0 | 4 | – | 4 | – | 0 |
| McMurry | 1 | – | 3 | – | 0 | 3 | – | 7 | – | 0 |
| Austin | 0 | – | 4 | – | 0 | 2 | – | 7 | – | 0 |
+ – Conference co-champions

The 1951 Howard Payne Yellow Jackets represented Howard Payne College—now known as Howard Payne University—as a member of the Texas Conference during the 1951 college football season. Led by first-year head coach Carl Anderson, the Yellow Jackets compiled an overall record of 4–4 with a mark of 3–1 in conference play, sharing the Texas Conference title with Abilene Christian and Texas A&I.

== Schedule ==
| Date | Time | Opponent | Site | Result | Attendance | Source |
|---|---|---|---|---|---|---|
| September 22 | | Louisiana Tech* | Lion Stadium; Brownwood, TX | L 27–34 | | |
| September 29 | | at Sam Houston State* | Pritchett Field; Huntsville, TX | L 19–27 | | |
| October 6 | | at Texas A&I | Javelina Stadium; Kingsville, TX | W 9–7 | | |
| October 13 | 8:00 p.m. | at Austin | Bearcat Stadium; Sherman, TX | W 35–20 | | |
| October 27 | | at Southwest Texas State* | Evans Field; San Marcos, TX | W 27–14 | | |
| November 3 | | East Texas State* | Brownwood, TX | L 21–38 | | |
| November 10 | 8:00 p.m. | at McMurry | Indiana Stadium; Abilene, TX | W 47–13 | | |
| November 22 | 2:00 p.m. | Abilene Christian | Lion Stadium; Brownwood, TX | L 14–34 | 6,500 | |
*Non-conference game; All times are in Central time
