= Texas A&M–Kingsville Javelinas football =

Intercollegiate American football team

- First season: 1925; 101 years ago
- Head coach: Scott Parr; 2nd season, 5–6 (.455)
- Location: Kingsville, Texas
- Stadium: Javelina Stadium (capacity: 15,000)
- NCAA division: Division II
- Conference: Lone Star Conference
- Division: South
- Colors: Blue and gold
- Bowl record: 10–3 (.769)

NAIA national championships
- NAIA: 1959, 1969 NAIA Division I: 1970, 1974, 1975, 1976, 1979

Conference championships
- 33 (27 LSC, 4 Alamo, 2 TCAA)

Division championships
- 7 LSC South
- Website: javelinaathletics.com

The Texas A&M–Kingsville Javelinas football program is the intercollegiate American football team for the Texas A&M University–Kingsville located in the U.S. state of Texas. The team competes in the Division II and is a member of the Lone Star Conference. The school's first football team was fielded in 1925. The team plays its home games at the 15,000-seat Javelina Stadium.

== History ==
In 1929, the school joined the original Texas Intercollegiate Athletic Association (TIAA). By the time that TIAA folded, the "Fighting Javelinas" had won two football championships. Following this, the school competed independently for several years. They moved from competing with junior colleges and teachers colleges to competing against larger schools throughout the state. One highlight of this period included a football game that pitted the Javelinas against the Aggies of Texas A&M at Kyle Field in College Station. The Javelinas led the game until the Aggies tied the game at 14 with three minutes left to play. The game ended in a tie. However, the Javelinas demonstrated that they could hold their own with a large football powerhouse. This further substantiated the team's nickname as "the toughest little team in the nation."

In 1934, the school participated in the Lone Star Conference on a probationary period. In 1935, the school joined the Alamo Conference. By 1937, the Javelinas captured their first Alamo Conference co-championship (with St. Mary's). The next year, the Javelinas won their first outright Alamo Conference football championship. This led to a string of football championships and the school's recognition as a football powerhouse.

For the 1954 season, A&I was finally inducted into the Lone Star Conference (LSC). By 1959, the Javelinas won the first in a long string of LSC championships. Since then, the school has remained a perennial conference powerhouse, winning 27 championships. During the years that the Lone Star Conference was a member of the National Association of Intercollegiate Athletics (NAIA), the Javelinas also picked up seven national championships. During the decade of the 1970s, the Javelinas won five NAIA national championships and went undefeated from the last game of 1973 through third game of 1977.

After the Lone Star Conference joined the National Collegiate Athletic Association's Division II in 1980, the Javelinas continued their conference, regional, and national success. The school changed its name from Texas A&I to Texas A&M-Kingsville in 1993. One year later, the Javelinas played in the 1994 NCAA Division II National Football Championship, only to lose to the University of North Alabama 16–10. The school has been in NCAA Division II since 1980, after being in the NAIA from 1955–1980.

=== Conference history ===
- 1925–1929: Independent
- 1930-1930: Texas Intercollegiate Athletic Association
- 1931–1938: Independent
- 1939–1940: Alamo Conference
- 1941–1948: Independent
- 1949–1953: Texas Collegiate Athletic Conference
- 1954–present: Lone Star Conference

=== List of head coaches ===
From 1942 to 1945, the Javelinas had no team due to World War II. Gil Steinke has the most victories coached as a Javelina. Steinke and Ron Harms are both in the College Football Hall of Fame.

- Lewis J. Smith (1925–1928): 16–10–1
- Bud McCallum (1929–1939, 1941): 65–31–9
- Dewey Mayhew (1940, 1946–1953): 46–38–1
- Gil Steinke (1954–1976): 182–61–4
- Fred Jonas (1977–1978): 14–6–1
- Ron Harms (1979–1999): 169–75
- Richard Cundiff (2000–2006): 52–28
- Bo Atterberry (2007–2012): 41–28
- David Calloway (2013–2014): 4–17
- Daren Wilkinson (2015–2019): 19–26
- Mike Salinas (2020–2024): 26–19
- Scott Parr (2025–present): 5–6

== Championships ==
=== National championships ===
While known as Texas A&I, the Javelinas won seven NAIA national championship titles.

Year	Coach	Record	Bowl
1959	Gil Steinke	12–1	W Holiday Bowl
1969	Gil Steinke	11–1	W Champion Bowl
1970	Gil Steinke	11–1	W Champion Bowl
1974	Gil Steinke	13–0	W Champion Bowl
1975	Gil Steinke	12–1	W Champion Bowl
1976	Gil Steinke	13–0	W Champion Bowl
1979	Ron Harms	12–1	W Palm Bowl

=== Conference championships ===
The Javelinas have won 33 conference titles since 1936.

Year	Conference	Coach	Overall record	Conference record
1936†	Alamo	Bud McCallum	6–4	1–1
1937†	Alamo	Bud McCallum	4–3–1	Unknown
1938	Alamo	Bud McCallum	7–3	Unknown
1939†	Alamo	Bud McCallum	6–1–3	1–0–1
1951†	Texas	Dewey Mayhew	5–4	3–1
1953†	Texas	Dewey Mayhew	4–5	3–1
1959†	Lone Star	Gil Steinke	12–1	6–1
1960	Lone Star	Gil Steinke	8–1–1	6–1
1962	Lone Star	Gil Steinke	9–0–1	7–0–1
1967	Lone Star	Gil Steinke	9–0	7–0
1968	Lone Star	Gil Steinke	10–2	6–1
1969†	Lone Star	Gil Steinke	11–1	6–1
1970	Lone Star	Gil Steinke	11–1	7–1
1974	Lone Star	Gil Steinke	13–0	8–0
1975	Lone Star	Gil Steinke	12–0	9–0
1976	Lone Star	Gil Steinke	13–0	7–0
1977†	Lone Star	Fred Jonas	8–1–1	5–1–1
1979	Lone Star	Ron Harms	12–1	6–1
1985	Lone Star	Ron Harms	8–3	5–0
1987†	Lone Star	Ron Harms	9–2	5–1
1988	Lone Star	Ron Harms	10–3	6–1
1989	Lone Star	Ron Harms	10–1	7–0
1992	Lone Star	Ron Harms	9–3	6–0
1993	Lone Star	Ron Harms	7–6	5–0
1994	Lone Star	Ron Harms	12–2	5–0
1995	Lone Star	Ron Harms	11–2	7–0
1996	Lone Star	Ron Harms	8–3	7–0
1997	Lone Star	Ron Harms	9–2	9–0
2001†	Lone Star	Richard Cundiff	9–2	8–1
2002	Lone Star	Richard Cundiff	10–3	7–1
2003	Lone Star	Richard Cundiff	11–2	8–0
2004	Lone Star	Richard Cundiff	9–2	8–1
2009†	Lone Star	Bo Atterberry	9–3	8–2

† Co-champions

=== Division championships ===
The Javelinas have won 7 Lone Star South Division titles since 1997.

Year	Coach	Overall record	Division record
1997	Ron Harms	9–2	7–0
1998	Ron Harms	11–3	7–0
2001†	Richard Cundiff	9–2–2	5–1
2002†	Richard Cundiff	10–3	5–1
2003	Richard Cundiff	11–2	6–0
2004†	Richard Cundiff	9–2	5–1
2009†	Bo Atterberry	9–3	4–2

† Co-champions

== Postseason appearances ==
=== Bowl games ===
Year	Bowl Name	Coach	Record	Opponent	Result
November 28, 1952	International Bowl	Dewey Mayhew	3–8	Herico Military Academy (Mexico)	W 49–0
December 12, 1959	NAIA Championship Game	Gil Steinke	12–1	Lenoir-Rhyne Bears	W 20–7
December 31, 1960	Great Southwest Bowl	Gil Steinke	8–1–1	Arkansas Tech Wonder Boys	W 45–14
December 14, 1968	NAIA Championship Game	Gil Steinke	10–2	Troy Trojans	L 35–43
December 13, 1969	NAIA Championship Game	Gil Steinke	11–1	Concordia-Moorhead Cobbers	W 32–7
December 12, 1970	NAIA Division I Championship Game	Gil Steinke	11–1	Wofford Terriers	W 38–7
December 14, 1974	NAIA Division I Championship Game	Gil Steinke	13–3	Henderson State Reddies	W 34–23
December 13, 1975	NAIA Division I Championship Game	Gil Steinke	12–3	Salem Tigers	W 37–0
December 11, 1976	NAIA Division I Championship Game	Gil Steinke	13–3	Central Arkansas Bears	W 26–0
December 15, 1979	NAIA Division I Championship Game	Ron Harms	12–1	Central Oklahoma Bronchos	W 20–14
November 25, 2012	Kanza Bowl	Bo Atterberry	6–5	Emporia State Hornets	L 38–45
December 3, 2016	Live United Texarkana Bowl	Daren Wilkinson	9–3	Southern Arkansas Muleriders	W 24–17
December 3, 2022	Heritage Bowl	Mike Salinas	7–5	East Central Tigers	L 21–38

=== NCAA Division II playoffs ===
The Javelinas have made twelve appearances in the NCAA Division II playoffs, with a combined record of 15–12.

Year	Round	Opponent	Result
1988	First Round; Quarterfinals; Semifinals	Mississippi College; Tennessee–Martin; Portland State	W, 39–15; W, 34–0; L, 27–35
1989	First Round	Mississippi College	L, 19–34
1992	First Round; Quarterfinals	Western State (CO); Portland State	W, 22–13; L, 30–35
1993	First Round; Quarterfinals; Semifinals	Portland State; UC Davis; North Alabama	W, 50–15; W, 51–28; L, 25–27
1994	First Round; Quarterfinals; Semifinals; National Championship	Western State (CO); Portland State; Indiana (PA); North Alabama	W, 43–7; W, 21–16; W, 46–20; L, 10–16
1995	First Round; Quarterfinals; Semifinals	Fort Hays State; Portland State; Pittsburg State	W, 59–28; W, 30–3; L, 25–28 ^{OT}
2001	First Round	UC Davis	L, 32–37
2002	First Round; Quarterfinals; Semifinals	Nebraska–Kearney; UC Davis; Valdosta State	W, 58–40; W, 27–20 ^{OT} L, 12–21
2003	First Round; Quarterfinals; Semifinals	Tarleton State; Central Oklahoma; Grand Valley State	W, 34–10; W, 49–6; L, 3–31
2004	First Round; Second Round	SE Oklahoma State; NW Missouri State	W, 40–30; L, 14–34
2009	First Round	Tarleton State	L, 56–57 ^{2OT}
2010	Second Round	NW Missouri State	L, 31–35

=== NAIA playoffs ===
Texas A&I made eight appearances in the NAIA playoffs, with a combined record of 16–1 and seven national championships.

Year	Round	Opponent	Result
1959	Semifinals; National Championship	Hillsdale; Lenoir–Rhyne	W, 20–0; W, 20–7
1968	Semifinals; National Championship	Northern State (SD); Troy State	W, 20–0; L, 35–43
1969	Semifinals; National Championship	New Mexico Highlands; Concordia Moorhead	W, 28–23; W, 32–7
1970	Semifinals; National Championship	Platteville State; Wofford	W, 16–0; W, 48–7
1974	Semifinals; National Championship	Cameron; Elon	W, 21–18; W, 34–23
1975	Semifinals; National Championship	Oregon College; Salem (WV)	W, 37–0; W, 37–0
1976	Semifinals; National Championship	Western State (CO); Central Arkansas	W, 56–14; W, 26–0
1979	Quarterfinals; Semifinals; National Championship	Western State (CO); Angelo State; Central State (OK)	W, 38–14; W, 22–19; W, 20–14

== Notable former players ==
Notable alumni include:

- Johnny Bailey
- Ed Dodds
- Earl Dotson
- Karl Douglas
- Mike Dyal
- Donovan Gans
- Roberto Garza
- Darrell Green (Pro Football Hall of Famer)
- James Guidry
- Al Harris
- Dwight Harrison
- James Jefferson
- Randy Johnson
- John Randle (Pro Football Hall of Famer)
- Heath Sherman
- Gene Upshaw (Pro Football Hall of Famer)
- Karl Williams
