= Daniel Baker College =

College in Brownwood, Texas, USA

Coordinates: 31.7106°N 98.9772°W

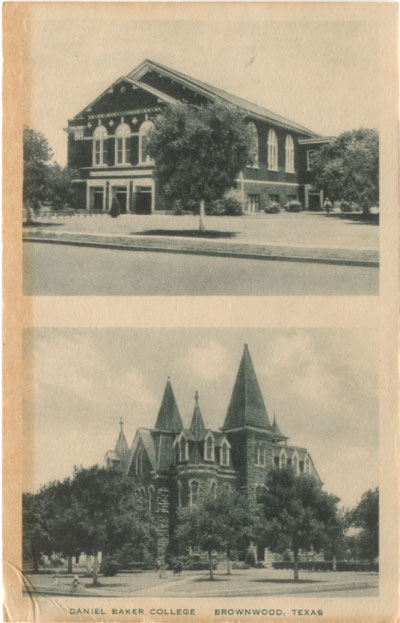
Daniel Baker College buildings

Daniel Baker College was founded April 5, 1889 in Brownwood, Texas, United States. It was named in memory of the Rev. Daniel Baker, a Presbyterian circuit-riding minister, who helped organize the first presbytery in Texas in 1840 and Austin College in 1849.

== History ==
Daniel Baker College was founded by Dr. B. T. McClelland, fulfilling the plans of the Austin Presbytery to open a Presbyterian college for west Texas.

The college's mascot was a goat named Hillbilly, which complemented their nickname, and its motto was Veritas et Humanitas, meaning "Truth and Humanity."

The institution was plagued with financial difficulties and was consolidated with nearby Howard Payne College (now Howard Payne University) in 1952. Its campus was taken over by Howard Payne University and the main building was renovated as the Guy D. Newman Honors Academy.

== Notable alumni ==
- Phil Baxter, songwriter, singer and band leader
- Frank Coker, American football player
- Novalyne Price Ellis, school teacher and speechwriter whose memoir was adapted into a movie
- Umphrey Lee, president of Southern Methodist University
