= Texas Conference =

- Founded: 1926
- Folded: 1956
- No. of teams: 5 (foundation, 1926); 9 (maximum, 1930s); 3 (dissolution, 1956)
- Region: Texas, New Mexico

The Texas Conference was a college athletic conference in the United States that existed from 1926 to 1956. During its existence, a total of 11 different colleges in Texas, and one from New Mexico, were members.

== History ==
The conference was created by a split within the Texas Intercollegiate Athletic Association (TIAA) between members who wanted to allow freshmen and transfers to play and schools that did not. This fault line also separated the teachers colleges that had joined over the years and the church-sponsored schools that had been founders. In May 1925, Austin College, Howard Payne University, Simmons University (now Hardin–Simmons University), Southwestern University, and Trinity University voted to leave the TIAA, but agreed to play out the fall 1925 football season within the TIAA. Play within the Texas Conference began with the 1926 basketball season. The five founding schools of the conference were all church-supported and agreed to ally themselves "along denominational lines."

At the end of 1926, St. Edward's University joined the conference. In 1932, Trinity University left to join other former members of the TIAA in the Lone Star Conference, while Abilene Christian, Daniel Baker College, and McMurry College joined the Texas Conference at the end of the year. Trinity returned at the end of 1933, giving the conference a high of nine teams. Hardin–Simmons left the conference in December 1935, reducing the conference to eight teams. In May 1937, Texas Wesleyan University was admitted to the conference, restoring total membership to nine. St. Edward's left the conference in December 1939, when it discontinued intercollegiate athletics.

Due to World War II, Daniel Baker did not field a football team in the fall of 1942, then in February 1943 ended its basketball season early. The conference suspended athletics in the spring of 1943, although Southwestern continued to field a football team, winning the 1944 Sun Bowl and 1945 Sun Bowl, after the college football seasons of 1943 and 1944, respectively. The Texas Conference reorganized in December 1945; at that time, Trinity University again departed and Daniel Baker did not return, leaving the conference with six teams: Abilene Christian, Austin, Howard Payne, McMurry, Southwestern, and Texas Wesleyan. At the end of 1946, Hardin–Simmons rejoined the conference. In 1947, Texas Wesleyan discontinued football, requiring it to quit the conference. In December 1948, Hardin–Simmons left in order to join the Lone Star Conference; they were effectively replaced by Texas A&I (now Texas A&M University–Kingsville), who joined the conference in February 1949, again giving the conference six teams.

In the early 1950s, the conference began to have trouble holding together. Southwestern discontinued its football program after the 1950 season, causing them to be dropped from the conference in 1951. Later, Eastern New Mexico University became the only school from outside of Texas to join the conference, with participation to start in the 1954 track season. But before they could start, in December 1953, the conference was cut from six members to three. Abilene Christian announced it would leave to become an independent, Texas A&I left to join the Lone Star Conference, and Austin College, because of an eligibility feud with other members, also left to become an independent. With three remaining members—Eastern New Mexico, Howard Payne, and McMurry—the conference disbanded in May 1956.

== Members ==
Key
Member at formation
Member at dissolution

Institution	Location	Founded	Nickname	Joined	Left	Current conference
Abilene Christian College	Abilene, Texas	1906	Wildcats	1933	1953	WAC (D-I) (Note: The Western Athletic Conference will rebrand as the United Athletic Conference in July 2026.)
Austin College	Sherman, Texas	1849	Kangaroos	1926	1953	SCAC (D-III)
Daniel Baker College	Brownwood, Texas	1888	Hillbillies	1933	1943	†
Eastern New Mexico University	Portales, New Mexico	1927	Greyhounds	1954	1956	LSC (D-II)
Hardin–Simmons University	Abilene, Texas	1891	Cowboys	1926	1935	ASC (D-III)
Hardin–Simmons University	Abilene, Texas	1891	Cowboys	1947	1948	ASC (D-III)
Howard Payne University	Brownwood, Texas	1889	Yellow Jackets	1926	1956	ASC (D-III)
McMurry College	Abilene, Texas	1923	Indians	1933	1956	ASC (D-III)
St. Edward's University	Austin, Texas	1877	Tigers / Crusaders	1927	1939	LSC (D-II)
Southwestern University	Georgetown, Texas	1840	Pirates	1926	1951	SCAC (D-III)
Texas A&I University	Kingsville, Texas	1925	Javelinas	1949	1953	LSC (D-II)
Texas Wesleyan University	Fort Worth, Texas	1890	Rams	1937	1947	SAC (NAIA)
Trinity University	San Antonio, Texas	1869	Tigers	1926	1932	SCAC (D-III)
Trinity University	San Antonio, Texas	1869	Tigers	1934	1945	SCAC (D-III)

† Daniel Baker was consolidated with Howard Payne in 1952.

== Football champions ==
- 1926 – Simmons
- 1927 – Southwestern (TX)
- 1928 – Howard Payne
- 1929 – Howard Payne
- 1930 – Howard Payne
- 1931 – Howard Payne and Simmons
- 1932 – Howard Payne
- 1933 – St. Edward's
- 1934 – Howard Payne
- 1935 – Austin
- 1936 – Howard Payne
- 1937 – Howard Payne
- 1938 – Howard Payne
- 1939 – Abilene Christian and St. Edward's
- 1940 – Abilene Christian, Howard Payne, and Texas Wesleyan
- 1941 – Howard Payne
- 1942 – Howard Payne
- 1943 – No season
- 1944 – No season
- 1945 – No season
- 1946 – Abilene Christian and Southwestern (TX)
- 1947 – Hardin and McMurry
- 1948 – McMurry
- 1949 – McMurry
- 1950 – Abilene Christian
- 1951 – Abilene Christian, Howard Payne, and Texas A&I
- 1952 – Abilene Christian
- 1953 – Abilene Christian, McMurry, Texas A&I
- 1954 – Howard Payne
- 1955 – McMurry

== Basketball champions ==
1939 – Trinity (TX)

== See also ==
- List of defunct college football conferences
- List of Texas Conference football standings
