= List of Arkansas Razorbacks football seasons =

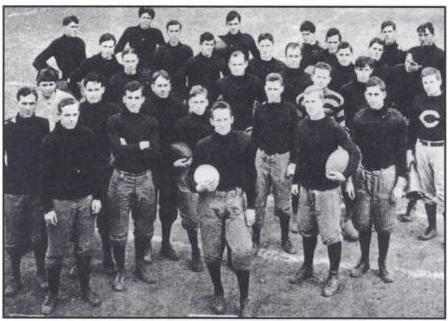
The undefeated Arkansas Cardinals team in 1909.

The Arkansas Razorbacks football team competes in the National Collegiate Athletic Association (NCAA) Division I Football Bowl Subdivision (FBS) representing the University of Arkansas in Fayetteville, Arkansas.

The University of Arkansas has continuously fielded an intercollegiate football team since the 1894 college football season. From 1894 to 1909, the team was known as the "Cardinals" and the school's mascot was a redbird. The team's name and mascot changed for the 1910 season after head coach Hugo Bezdek proclaimed the undefeated 1909 team played "like a wild band of razorback hogs."

The Razorbacks have been a member of only two athletic conferences. From 1894 through 1914, Arkansas competed as a football independent without any conference affiliation. In 1915, the Razorbacks became a charter member of the Southwest Conference (SWC). Arkansas won 13 conference championships before withdrawing from the SWC after the 1991 season. The Razorbacks became a charter member of the Western Division of the Southeastern Conference (SEC) in 1992. Since joining the SEC, the Razorbacks have won 4 division titles and appeared in the SEC Championship Game 3 times.

The Razorbacks have competed in 44 bowl games, the first was a tie in the 1934 Dixie Classic against Centenary College of Louisiana. The Razorbacks' first bowl game win came against the William & Mary Indians in the Dixie Bowl. The Razorbacks have received votes in the final rankings of the AP Poll in 28 seasons and the Coaches' Poll in 27 seasons. In 1964, the Razorbacks finished #2 in both the AP and Coaches' polls and were named national champions by the Football Writers Association of America, winning the Grantland Rice Trophy. The AP and Coaches' polls voted the Alabama Crimson Tide as their national champion in 1964 at the end of the regular season, but eventually stopped voting for their national champion until after the bowl games because Alabama lost to the Texas Longhorns in the Orange Bowl, a team Arkansas had beaten earlier that year in Austin. Arkansas went on to defeat the Nebraska Cornhuskers in the Cotton Bowl, becoming the only undefeated team left in major college football in 1964.

== Seasons ==
Year	Coach	Overall	Conference	Standing	Bowl/playoffs	Coaches^{#}	AP^{°}
John C. Futrall (Independent) (1894–1896)
1894	John C. Futrall	2–1					
1895	John C. Futrall	1–0					
1896	John C. Futrall	2–1					
B. N. Wilson (Independent) (1897–1898)
1897	B. N. Wilson	2–0–1					
1898	B. N. Wilson	2–1					
Colbert Searles (Independent) (1899–1900)
1899	Colbert Searles	3–1–1					
1900	Colbert Searles	2–1–1					
Charles Thomas (Independent) (1901–1902)
1901	Charles Thomas	3–5					
1902	Charles Thomas	6–3					
D. A. McDaniel (Independent) (1903)
1903	D. A. McDaniel	3–4					
A. D. Brown (Independent) (1904–1905)
1904	A. D. Brown	4–3					
1905	A. D. Brown	2–6					
Frank Longman (Independent) (1906–1907)
1906	Frank Longman	2–4–2					
1907	Frank Longman	4–4–1					
Hugo Bezdek (Independent) (1908–1912)
1908	Hugo Bezdek	5–4					
1909	Hugo Bezdek	7–0					
1910	Hugo Bezdek	7–1					
1911	Hugo Bezdek	6–2–1					
1912	Hugo Bezdek	4–6					
E. T. Pickering (Independent) (1913–1914)
1913	E. T. Pickering	7–2					
1914	E. T. Pickering	3–6 (Note: Arkansas claims Ole Miss used an ineligible player and considers this a forfeit.)					
T. T. McConnell (Southwest Conference) (1915–1916)
1915	T. T. McConnell	4–2–1	1–1	T–2nd			
1916	T. T. McConnell	4–4	0–2	T–5th			
Norman C. Paine (Southwest Conference) (1917–1918)
1917	Norman C. Paine	5–1–1	0–1–1	6th			
1918	Norman C. Paine	3–2	0–1	T–6th			
James B. Craig (Southwest Conference) (1919)
1919	James B. Craig	3–4	1–2	5th			
George McLaren (Southwest Conference) (1920–1921)
1920	George McLaren	3–2–2	2–0–1	2nd			
1921	George McLaren	5–3–1	2–1	3rd			
Francis Schmidt (Southwest Conference) (1922–1928)
1922	Francis Schmidt	4–5	1–3	6th			
1923	Francis Schmidt	6–2–1	2–2	T–4th			
1924	Francis Schmidt	7–2–1	1–2–1	7th			
1925	Francis Schmidt	4–4–1	2–2–1	T–4th			
1926	Francis Schmidt	5–5	2–2	T–3rd			
1927	Francis Schmidt	8–1	3–1	3rd			
1928	Francis Schmidt	7–2	3–1	3rd			
Fred Thomsen (Southwest Conference) (1929–1941)
1929	Fred Thomsen	7–2	3–2	5th			
1930	Fred Thomsen	3–6	2–2	5th			
1931	Fred Thomsen	3–5–1	0–4	7th			
1932	Fred Thomsen	1–6–2	1–4	7th			
1933	Fred Thomsen	7–3–1	4–1	1st (Note: Arkansas finished first the SWC, but because the Razorbacks has used an ineligible player, conference officials voted not to recognize a champion for the 1933 season. Ulysses "Heine" Schleuter had told coach Thomsen that he had remaining eligibility, but had played at the University of Nebraska in 1931 and 1932 and at the Kemper Military School. Schleuter's status came into question when a student at SMU saw a newspaper photograph of Schleuter and recognized him as a former Cornhusker.)	T Dixie Classic		
1934	Fred Thomsen	4–4–2	2–3–1	5th			
1935	Fred Thomsen	5–5	2–4	5th			
1936	Fred Thomsen	7–3	5–1	1st			18
1937	Fred Thomsen	6–2–2	3–2–1	3rd			14
1938	Fred Thomsen	2–7–1	1–5	T–6th			
1939	Fred Thomsen	4–5–1	2–3–1	5th			
1940	Fred Thomsen	4–6	1–5	6th			
1941	Fred Thomsen	3–7	0–6	7th			
George Cole (Southwest Conference) (1942)
1942	George Cole	3–7	0–6	7th			
John Tomlin (Southwest Conference) (1943)
1943	John Tomlin	2–7	1–4	T–5th			
Glen Rose (Southwest Conference) (1944–1945)
1944	Glen Rose	5–5–1	2–2–1	3rd			
1945	Glen Rose	3–7	1–5	7th			
John Barnhill (Southwest Conference) (1946–1949)
1946	John Barnhill	6–3–2	5–1	T–1st	T Cotton		16
1947	John Barnhill	6–4–1	1–4–1	T–5th	W Dixie		
1948	John Barnhill	5–5	2–4	5th			
1949	John Barnhill	5–5	2–4	6th			
Otis Douglas (Southwest Conference) (1950–1952)
1950	Otis Douglas	2–8	1–5	7th			
1951	Otis Douglas	5–5	2–4	6th			
1952	Otis Douglas	2–8	1–5	7th			
Bowden Wyatt (Southwest Conference) (1953–1954)
1953	Bowden Wyatt	3–7	2–4	5th			
1954	Bowden Wyatt	8–3	5–1	1st	L Cotton	8	10
Jack Mitchell (Southwest Conference) (1955–1957)
1955	Jack Mitchell	5–4–1	3–2–1	4th			
1956	Jack Mitchell	6–4	3–3	4th			
1957	Jack Mitchell	6–4	2–4	T–5th			
Frank Broyles (Southwest Conference) (1958–1976)
1958	Frank Broyles	4–6	2–4	T–5th			
1959	Frank Broyles	9–2	5–1	T–1st	W Gator	9	9
1960	Frank Broyles	8–3	6–1	1st	L Cotton	7	7
1961	Frank Broyles	8–3	6–1	T–1st	L Sugar	8	9
1962	Frank Broyles	9–2	6–1	2nd	L Sugar	6	6
1963	Frank Broyles	5–5	3–4	5th			
1964	Frank Broyles	11–0	7–0	1st	W Cotton	2	2
1965	Frank Broyles	10–1	7–0	1st	L Cotton	2	3
1966	Frank Broyles	8–2	5–2	T–2nd			
1967	Frank Broyles	4–5–1	3–3–1	5th			
1968	Frank Broyles	10–1	6–1	T–1st	W Sugar	9	6
1969	Frank Broyles	9–2	6–1	2nd	L Sugar	3	7
1970	Frank Broyles	9–2	6–1	2nd		12	11
1971	Frank Broyles	8–3–1	5–1–1	2nd	L Liberty	20	16
1972	Frank Broyles	6–5	3–4	T–4th			
1973	Frank Broyles	5–5–1	3–3–1	T–4th			
1974	Frank Broyles	6–4–1	3–3–1	T–4th			
1975	Frank Broyles	10–2	6–1	T–1st	W Cotton	6	7
1976	Frank Broyles	5–5–1	3–4–1	5th			
Lou Holtz (Southwest Conference) (1977–1983)
1977	Lou Holtz	11–1	7–1	2nd	W Orange	3	3
1978	Lou Holtz	9–2–1	6–2	T–2nd	T Fiesta	10	11
1979	Lou Holtz	10–2	6–1	T–1st	L Sugar	9	8
1980	Lou Holtz	7–5	3–5	T–6th	W Hall of Fame		
1981	Lou Holtz	8–4	5–3	4th	L Gator	16	
1982	Lou Holtz	9–2–1	5–2–1	3rd	W Bluebonnet	8	9
1983	Lou Holtz	6–5	4–4	5th			
Ken Hatfield (Southwest Conference) (1984–1989)
1984	Ken Hatfield	7–4–1	5–3	T–3rd	L Liberty		
1985	Ken Hatfield	10–2	6–2	T–2nd	W Holiday	12	12
1986	Ken Hatfield	9–3	6–2	T–2nd	L Orange	16	15
1987	Ken Hatfield	9–4	5–2	T–2nd	L Liberty		
1988	Ken Hatfield	10–2	7–0	1st	L Cotton	13	12
1989	Ken Hatfield	10–2	7–1	1st	L Cotton	13	13
Jack Crowe (Southwest Conference) (1990–1991)
1990	Jack Crowe	3–8	1–7	7th			
1991	Jack Crowe	6–6	5–3	T–2nd	L Independence		
Jack Crowe (Southeastern Conference) (1992)
1992	Jack Crowe (Note: Head coach Jack Crowe was fired after the first game, when Arkansas lost to FCS The Citadel. Joe Kines was promoted from defensive coordinator to interim head coach until the end of the season, when Danny Ford would be named head coach.)	3–7–1	3–4–1	4th (Western)			
Danny Ford (Southeastern Conference) (1993–1997)
1993	Danny Ford	6–4–1	4–3–1	T-2nd (Western)			
1994	Danny Ford	4–7	2–6	T–4th (Western)			
1995	Danny Ford	8–5	6–2	1st (Western)	L Carquest		
1996	Danny Ford	4–7	2–6	5th (Western)			
1997	Danny Ford	4–7	2–6	5th (Western)			
Houston Nutt (Southeastern Conference) (1998–2007)
1998	Houston Nutt	9–3	6–2	T–1st (Western)	L Florida Citrus	17	16
1999	Houston Nutt	8–4	4–4	T–3rd (Western)	W Cotton	19	17
2000	Houston Nutt	6–6	3–5	T–5th (Western)	L Las Vegas		
2001	Houston Nutt	7–5	4–4	T–3rd (Western)	L Cotton		
2002	Houston Nutt	9–5	5–3	T–2nd (Western) (Note: In 2002, Alabama finished first in Western Division of the Southeastern Conference (SEC) with a conference record of 6–2, but was ineligible for the division title or postseason play as part of a penalty for National Collegiate Athletic Association (NCAA) violations. Arkansas, Auburn, and LSU for second place, each with a 5–3 mark in the conference, and were named co-champions. Arkansas was awarded a berth in the SEC Championship Game by virtue of their head-to-head wins over Auburn and LSU.)	L Music City		
2003	Houston Nutt	9–4	4–4	4th (Western)	W Independence		
2004	Houston Nutt	5–6	3–5	T–3rd (Western)			
2005	Houston Nutt	4–7	2–6	4th (Western)			
2006	Houston Nutt	10–4	7–1	1st (Western)	L Capital One	16	15
2007	Houston Nutt (Note: Houston Nutt coached the first 12 games of the season and resigned before the Cotton Bowl and was replaced by interim head coach Reggie Herring.)	8–5	4–4	T–3rd (Western)	L Cotton		
Bobby Petrino (Southeastern Conference) (2008–2011)
2008	Bobby Petrino	5–7	2–6	T–5th (Western)			
2009	Bobby Petrino	8–5	3–5	T–4th (Western)	W Liberty		
2010	Bobby Petrino	10–3	6–2	T–2nd (Western)	L Sugar^{†}	12	12
2011	Bobby Petrino	11–2	6–2	3rd (Western)	W Cotton	5	5
John L. Smith (Southeastern Conference) (2012)
2012	John L. Smith	4–8	2–6	6th (Western)			
Bret Bielema (Southeastern Conference) (2013–2017)
2013	Bret Bielema	3–9	0–8	7th (Western)			
2014	Bret Bielema	7–6	2–6	7th (Western)	W Texas		
2015	Bret Bielema	8–5	5–3	3rd (Western)	W Liberty		
2016	Bret Bielema	7–6	3–5	5th (Western)	L Belk		
2017	Bret Bielema	4–8	1–7	7th (Western)			
Chad Morris (Southeastern Conference) (2018–2019)
2018	Chad Morris	2–10	0–8	7th (Western)			
2019	Chad Morris (Note: Chad Morris served as Arkansas's head coach for the first ten games of the 2019 season before he was fired. Barry Lunney Jr. was appointed as interim head coach for the last two games of the season. Arkansas finished the year with an overall record of 2–10 and a conference mark of 0–8.)	2–10	0–8	7th (Western)			
Sam Pittman (Southeastern Conference) (2020–2025)
2020	Sam Pittman	3–7	3–7	T–6th (Western)	CX Texas (Note: The 2020 Texas Bowl was canceled due to COVID-19 and ruled a no contest.)		
2021	Sam Pittman	9–4	4–4	T–3rd (Western)	W Outback	20	21
2022	Sam Pittman	7–6	3–5	5th (Western)	W Liberty		
2023	Sam Pittman	4–8	1–7	7th (Western)			
2024	Sam Pittman	7–6	3–5	11th	W Liberty		
2025	Sam Pittman (Note: Sam Pittman served as Arkansas's head coach for the first five games of the 2025 season before he was fired. Bobby Petrino was appointed as interim head coach for the remaining seven games of the season. Arkansas finished the year with an overall record of 2–10 and a conference mark of 0–8.)	2-10	0-8	16th			
Total:		748–557–40					
National championship Conference title Conference division title or championship game berth
^{†}Indicates Bowl Coalition, Bowl Alliance, BCS, or CFP / New Years' Six bowl.; ^{#}Rankings from final Coaches Poll.
