= 1937 Cotton Bowl Classic =

- 1st Cotton Bowl Classic
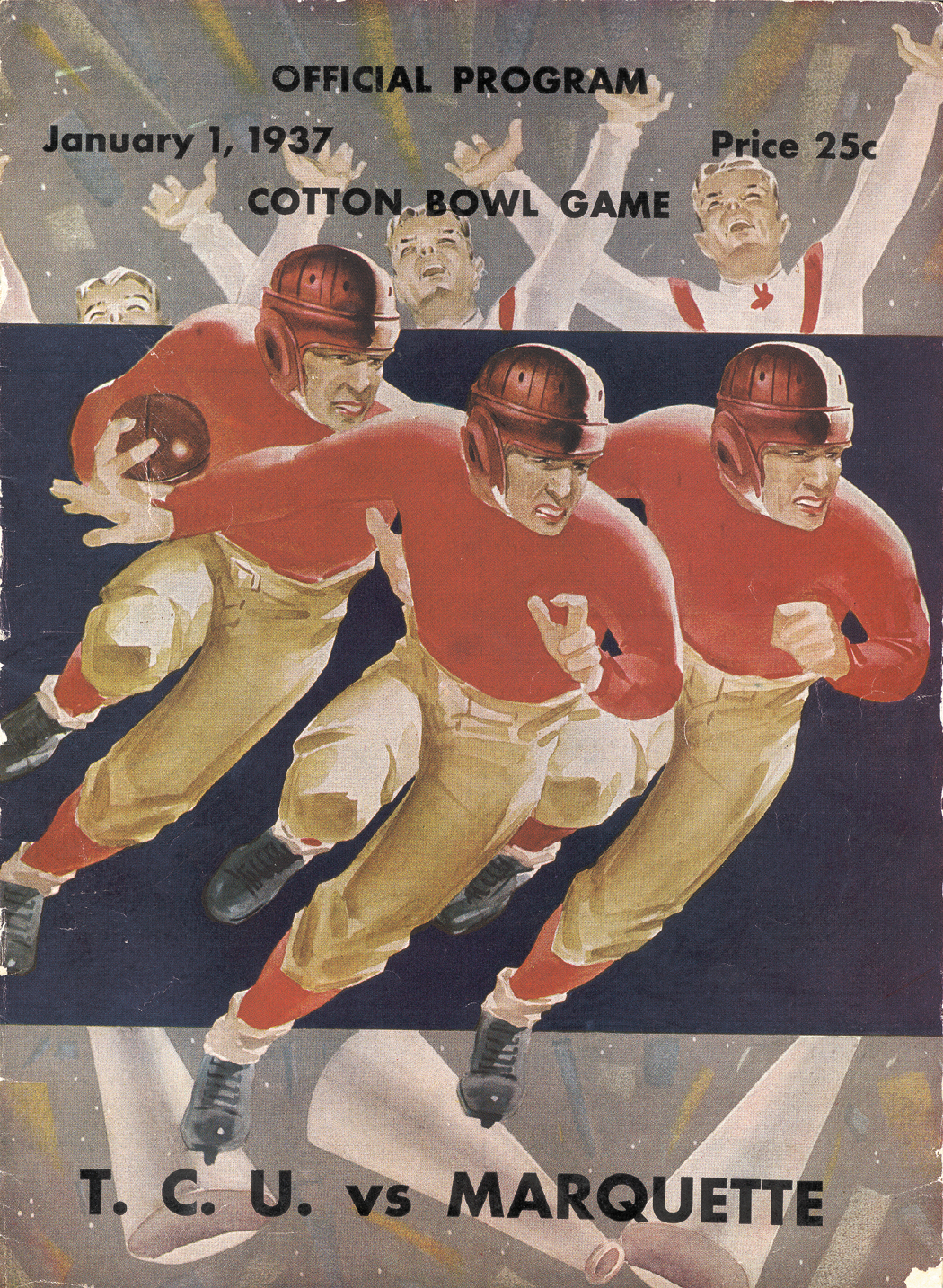
Marquette Golden Avalanche	TCU Horned Frogs
(7–1)	(8–2–2)
Independent	SWC
6	16
Head coach: Frank Murray	Head coach: Dutch Meyer
AP 20	AP 16
	1	2	3	4	Total
Marquette	6	0	0	0	6
TCU	10	6	0	0	16
- Date: January 1, 1937
- Season: 1936
- Stadium: Cotton Bowl
- Location: Dallas, Texas
- MVP: C Ki Aldrich (TCU); QB Sammy Baugh (TCU); E L. D. Meyer (TCU)
- Referee: Benny Boynton
- Attendance: 17,000

The Cotton Bowl in Dallas, Texas, hosted the Cotton Bowl Classic.

The 1937 Cotton Bowl Classic, the first Cotton Bowl Classic game and part of the 1936–37 bowl game season, took place on January 1, 1937, at the Cotton Bowl in Dallas, Texas. The competing teams were the Marquette Golden Avalanche, competing as a football independent, and the TCU Horned Frogs, representing the Southwest Conference (SWC) as conference champions. TCU won the inaugural contest, 16–6.

== Teams ==
=== Marquette ===
The 1936 Marquette squad finished the regular season with a 7–1 record after losing to Duquesne in their regular season finale. On December 9, Marquette accepted an invitation to play in the inaugural Cotton Bowl Classic on New Years Day. The appearance marked the first all-time bowl appearance for the Golden Avalanche. Marquette accepted the bid also in part to expand their brand into the Southern United States and make contacts with other southern football teams to schedule future contests. Marquette never again played in a bowl game and discontinued its football program after the 1960 season.

=== TCU ===
TCU finished the regular season with an 8–2–2 record with ties against Mississippi State and SMU and losses against Texas Tech and Texas A&M. After they defeated Santa Clara in their regular season finale, the Cotton Bowl extended TCU an invitation to the game over Arkansas. On December 16, the Horned Frogs were granted permission from the Southwest Conference to compete against the Golden Avalanche in the Cotton Bowl Classic. The appearance marked the third all-time bowl appearance for TCU.

== Game summary ==
L. D. Meyer scored the first points of the game when he successfully connected on a 33-yard field goal to give the Horned Frogs an early 3–0 lead. Marquette responded with their only points of the game later in the quarter when Arthur Guepe had a punt return of 60 yards for a touchdown. After a failed extra point attempt by Ward Cuff, the Golden Avalanche led 6–3. The Horned Frogs retook the lead for good at the end of the first quarter when Meyer caught a 55-yard Sammy Baugh touchdown pass, and with the extra point led 10–6. Meyer then scored his second touchdown of the game when the second quarter when Vic Montgomery threw him an 18-yard touchdown strike. Leading 16–6 entering the second half, neither team would score again giving TCU the victory. For their performances, Ki Aldrich, Baugh and Meyer were named the Most Valuable Players of the game.

Scoring summary

Quarter	Time	Drive			Team	Scoring information	Score	
Quarter	Time	Plays	Yards	TOP	Team	Scoring information	Marquette	TCU
1		7	40		TCU	33-yard field goal by L. D. Meyer	0	3
1		1	60		Marquette	Arthur Guepe 60-yard punt return for a touchdown, Ward Cuff no kick good	6	3
1		7	78		TCU	L. D. Meyer 55-yard touchdown reception from Sammy Baugh, L. D. Meyer kick good	6	10
2		8	62		TCU	L. D. Meyer 18-yard touchdown reception from Vic Montgomery, L. D. Meyer kick no good	6	16
"TOP" = time of possession. For other American football terms, see Glossary of American football.							6	16
