= 1934 Dixie Classic =

Arkansas Razorbacks	Centenary Gentlemen
(7–3)	(8–0–3)
SWC	SIAA
7	7
Head coach: Fred Thomsen	Head coach: Homer H. Norton
	1	2	3	4	Total
Arkansas	0	7	0	0	7
Centenary	0	7	0	0	7
- Date: January 1, 1934
- Season: 1933
- Stadium: Fair Park Stadium
- Location: Dallas, Texas
- Attendance: 12,000

The 1934 Dixie Classic was a post-season college football bowl game between the Arkansas Razorbacks and the Centenary Gentlemen. Arkansas and Centenary tied the game, 7–7. The 1934 edition was the final Dixie Classic, which was a precursor to the later post-season game in Fair Park, the Cotton Bowl Classic.

== Setting ==
The game was similar to the meeting at the end of 1932, when the two squads tied, 0–0, in Shreveport. Centenary came in unbeaten at 8–0–3, tying three straight games to LSU, Texas, and TCU. The team would disband after the 1941 season. The Hogs entered at 7–3, with losses at LSU, Rice, and Tulsa. Arkansas would remain a Division I program, and achieve over 30 bowl games.

== Game summary ==
The first quarter passed without scoring, before the Razorbacks lit up the scoreboard first, a Tom Murphy pass to Elvin Geiser, who then added the extra point. Centenary back Harold Olsin would haul in a pass from Manning Smith to cut the Hog lead to 7–6. The extra point by Chester Weidman was missed, which would've given Arkansas the win, but offside was called against the Razorbacks, and a retry resulted in a completed extra point. Arkansas would attempt a 14-yard field goal to win the game in the fourth quarter, but Geiser was wide right. The game ended in a tie.

Scoring summary

Quarter	Time	Drive			Team	Scoring information	Score	
Quarter	Time	Plays	Yards	TOP	Team	Scoring information	ARK	CEN
2					ARK	Elvin Geiser 24-yard touchdown reception from Tom Murphy, Elvin Geiser kick good	7	0
2					CEN	Harold Olsin 20-yard touchdown reception from Manning Smith, Chester Weidman kick good	7	7
"TOP" = time of possession. For other American football terms, see Glossary of American football.							7	7
