= 1936 Rice Owls football team =

American college football season

1936 Rice Owls football
- Conference: Southwest Conference
- Record: 5–7 (1–5 SWC)
- Head coach: Jimmy Kitts (3rd season)
- Home stadium: Rice Field

1936 Southwest Conference football standings
	Conf.					Overall
Team	W		L		T	W		L		T
No. 18 Arkansas $	5	–	1	–	0	7	–	3	–	0
No. 16 TCU	4	–	1	–	1	9	–	2	–	2
Texas A&M	3	–	2	–	1	8	–	3	–	1
Baylor	3	–	2	–	1	6	–	3	–	1
SMU	2	–	3	–	1	5	–	4	–	1
Rice	1	–	5	–	0	5	–	7	–	0
Texas	1	–	5	–	0	2	–	6	–	1
$ – Conference champion; Rankings from AP Poll

The 1936 Rice Owls football team was an American football team that represented Rice Institute as a member of the Southwest Conference (SWC) during the 1936 college football season. In its third season under head coach Jimmy Kitts, the team compiled a 5–7 record (1–5 against SWC opponents) and outscored opponents by a total of 127 to 108.

== Schedule ==
Date	Opponent	Site	Result	Attendance	Source
September 19	vs. Texas A&I*	Clark Field; Corpus Christi, TX	W 33–0	4,000	
September 26	at LSU*	Tiger Stadium; Baton Rouge, LA	L 7–20	25,000	
October 2	at Duquesne*	Forbes Field; Pittsburgh, PA	L 0–14	16,000	
October 10	Texas A&M	Rice Field; Houston, TX	L 0–3	14,000	
October 17	at Georgia*	Sanford Stadium; Athens, GA	W 13–6		
October 24	Texas	Rice Field; Houston, TX (rivalry)	W 7–0	17,000	
October 31	George Washington*	Rice Field; Houston, TX	W 12–6		
November 7	at Arkansas	The Hill; Fayetteville, AR	L 14–20	5,000	
November 14	Sam Houston State*	Rice Field; Houston, TX	W 34–7		
November 21	TCU	Rice Field; Houston, TX	L 0–13	15,000	
November 28	Baylor	Rice Field; Houston, TX	L 7–10		
December 5	SMU	Rice Field; Houston, TX (rivalry)	L 0–9		
*Non-conference game
