= 1934 SMU Mustangs football team =

American college football season

1934 SMU Mustangs football
- Conference: Southwest Conference
- Record: 8–2–2 (3–2–1 SWC)
- Head coach: Ray Morrison (15th season)
- Captain: Ray Fuqua
- Home stadium: Ownby Stadium, Fair Park Stadium

1934 Southwest Conference football standings
	Conf.					Overall
Team	W		L		T	W		L		T
No. 5 Rice $	5	–	1	–	0	9	–	1	–	1
Texas	4	–	1	–	1	7	–	2	–	1
SMU	3	–	2	–	1	8	–	2	–	2
TCU	3	–	3	–	0	8	–	4	–	0
Arkansas	2	–	3	–	1	4	–	4	–	2
Texas A&M	1	–	4	–	1	2	–	7	–	2
Baylor	1	–	5	–	0	3	–	7	–	0
$ – Conference champion; Rankings from Dickinson System

The 1934 SMU Mustangs football team represented Southern Methodist University (SMU) as a member of the Southwest Conference (SWC) during the 1934 college football season. Led by Ray Morrison in his 15th and final season as head coach, the Mustangs compiled an overall record of 8–2–2 with a mark of 3–2–1 in conference play, placing third in the SWC.

== Schedule ==
Date	Time	Opponent	Site	Result	Attendance	Source
September 22		North Texas State Teachers*	Ownby Stadium; University Park, TX (rivalry)	W 33–0		
September 29		at Austin*	Ownby Stadium; University Park, TX	W 33–0		
October 6		at LSU*	Tiger Stadium; Baton Rouge, LA	T 14–14		
October 13		at Rice	Rice Field; Houston, TX (rivalry)	L 0–9	14,000	
October 20		Oklahoma A&M*	Fair Park Stadium; Dallas, TX	W 41–0		
October 27		at Fordham*	Polo Grounds; New York, NY	W 26–14	25,000	
November 3		at Texas	War Memorial Stadium; Austin, TX	T 7–7		
November 10		Texas A&M	Ownby Stadium; University Park, TX	W 28–0	12,000	
November 17		Arkansas	Ownby Stadium; University Park, TX	W 10–6		
November 24		at Baylor	Carroll Field; Waco, TX	L 6–13		
December 1		TCU	Ownby Stadium; University Park, TX (rivalry)	W 19–0	9,000	
December 8	2:00 p.m.	at Washington University*	Walsh Stadium; St. Louis, MO	W 7–0	7,300	
*Non-conference game; All times are in Central time
