= 1936 Sam Houston State Bearkats football team =

American college football season

1936 Sam Houston State Bearkats football
- Conference: Lone Star Conference
- Record: 2–7 (0–4 LSC)
- Head coach: Henry O. Crawford (1st season)
- Home stadium: Pritchett Field

1936 Lone Star Conference football standings
	Conf.					Overall
Team	W		L		T	W		L		T
North Texas State $	4	–	0	–	0	6	–	2	–	1
East Texas State	3	–	1	–	0	8	–	2	–	0
Stephen F. Austin	2	–	2	–	0	4	–	3	–	1
Southwest Texas State	1	–	3	–	0	3	–	5	–	1
Sam Houston State	0	–	4	–	0	2	–	7	–	0
$ – Conference champion

The 1936 Sam Houston State Bearkats football team represented Sam Houston State Teachers College (now known as Sam Houston State University) as a member of the Lone Star Conference (LSC) during the 1936 college football season. Led by first-year head coach Henry O. Crawford, the Bearkats compiled an overall record of 2–7 with a mark of 0–4 in conference play, and finished fifth in the LSC.

== Schedule ==
Date	Opponent	Site	Result	Source
September 26	at Texas A&M*	Kyle Field; College Station, TX	L 6–39	
October 2	at East Central*	Ada, OK	W 28–0	
October 9	Lamar*	Pritchett Field; Huntsville, TX	W 14–0	
October 16	at East Texas State	Commerce, TX	L 0–27	
October 23	at Southwestern Louisiana*	Campus Athletic Field; Lafayette, LA	L 6–7	
October 30	North Texas State	Pritchett Field; Huntsville, TX	L 7–27	
November 6	Southwest Texas State	Pritchett Field; Huntsville, TX (rivalry)	L 0–14	
November 14	at Rice*	Rice Field; Houston, TX	L 7–34	
November 20	Stephen F. Austin	Pritchett Field; Huntsville, TX (rivalry)	L 6–7	
*Non-conference game
