= 1936 Texas Longhorns football team =

American college football season

1936 Texas Longhorns football
- Conference: Southwest Conference
- Record: 2–6–1 (1–5 SWC)
- Head coach: Jack Chevigny (3rd season)
- Captain: Clint Small
- Home stadium: War Memorial Stadium

1936 Southwest Conference football standings
	Conf.					Overall
Team	W		L		T	W		L		T
No. 18 Arkansas $	5	–	1	–	0	7	–	3	–	0
No. 16 TCU	4	–	1	–	1	9	–	2	–	2
Texas A&M	3	–	2	–	1	8	–	3	–	1
Baylor	3	–	2	–	1	6	–	3	–	1
SMU	2	–	3	–	1	5	–	4	–	1
Rice	1	–	5	–	0	5	–	7	–	0
Texas	1	–	5	–	0	2	–	6	–	1
$ – Conference champion; Rankings from AP Poll

The 1936 Texas Longhorns football team was an American football team that represented the University of Texas (now known as the University of Texas at Austin) as a member of the Southwest Conference (SWC) during the 1936 college football season. In their third year under head coach Jack Chevigny, the Longhorns compiled an overall record of 2–6–1, with a mark of 1–5 in conference play, and finished tied for sixth in the SWC.

== Schedule ==
Date	Opponent	Site	Result	Attendance	Source
October 3	LSU*	War Memorial Stadium; Austin, TX	T 6–6	15,000	
October 10	vs. Oklahoma*	Fair Park Stadium; Dallas, TX (rivalry)	W 6–0	25,000	
October 17	Baylor	War Memorial Stadium; Austin, TX (rivalry)	L 18–21		
October 24	at Rice	Rice Field; Houston, TX (rivalry)	L 0–7	17,000	
October 31	No. 15 SMU	War Memorial Stadium; Austin, TX	L 7–14	16,000	
November 7	at TCU	Amon G. Carter Stadium; Fort Worth, TX (rivalry)	L 6–27	12,000	
November 14	at No. 2 Minnesota*	Memorial Stadium; Minneapolis, MN	L 19–47	47,400	
November 26	Texas A&M	War Memorial Stadium; Austin, TX (rivalry)	W 7–0	35,000	
December 5	at Arkansas	Quigley Stadium; Little Rock, AR (rivalry)	L 0–6	7,000	
*Non-conference game; Rankings from AP Poll released prior to the game
