= 1934 TCU Horned Frogs football team =

American college football season

1934 TCU Horned Frogs football
- Conference: Southwest Conference
- Record: 8–4 (3–3 SWC)
- Head coach: Dutch Meyer (1st season)
- Offensive scheme: Meyer spread
- Home stadium: Amon G. Carter Stadium

1934 Southwest Conference football standings
	Conf.					Overall
Team	W		L		T	W		L		T
No. 5 Rice $	5	–	1	–	0	9	–	1	–	1
Texas	4	–	1	–	1	7	–	2	–	1
SMU	3	–	2	–	1	8	–	2	–	2
TCU	3	–	3	–	0	8	–	4	–	0
Arkansas	2	–	3	–	1	4	–	4	–	2
Texas A&M	1	–	4	–	1	2	–	7	–	2
Baylor	1	–	5	–	0	3	–	7	–	0
$ – Conference champion; Rankings from Dickinson System

The 1934 TCU Horned Frogs football team represented Texas Christian University (TCU) in the 1934 college football season. The Horned Frogs finished the season 8–4 overall and 3–3 in the Southwest Conference. The team was coached by Dutch Meyer in his first year as head coach. The Frogs played their home games in Amon G. Carter Stadium, which is located on campus in Fort Worth, Texas.

== Schedule ==
Date	Opponent	Site	Result	Attendance	Source
September 21	at Daniel Baker*	Brownwood, TX	W 33–7		
September 29	North Texas State Teachers*	Amon G. Carter Stadium; Fort Worth, TX	W 27–0	5,000	
October 6	Arkansas	Amon G. Carter Stadium; Fort Worth, TX	L 10–24	6,000	
October 13	at Tulsa*	Skelly Field; Tulsa, OK	W 14–12	10,000	
October 20	at Texas A&M	Kyle Field; College Station, TX (rivalry)	W 13–0		
October 27	at Centenary*	Louisiana State Fairgrounds; Shreveport, LA	L 0–13	8,000	
November 3	Baylor	Amon G. Carter Stadium; Fort Worth, TX (rivalry)	W 34–12		
November 10	at Loyola (LA)*	Loyola Stadium; New Orleans, LA	W 7–0		
November 17	Texas	Amon G. Carter Stadium; Fort Worth, TX	L 19–20		
November 24	at Rice	Rice Stadium; Houston, TX	W 7–2		
December 1	at SMU	Ownby Stadium; University Park, TX (rivalry)	L 0–19	9,000	
December 8	at Santa Clara*	Kezar Stadium; San Francisco, CA	W 9–7	3,500	
*Non-conference game
