= 1934 Rice Owls football team =

American college football season

1934 Rice Owls football

SWC champion
- Conference: Southwest Conference
- Record: 9–1–1 (5–1 SWC)
- Head coach: Jimmy Kitts (1st season)
- Home stadium: Rice Field

1934 Southwest Conference football standings
	Conf.					Overall
Team	W		L		T	W		L		T
No. 5 Rice $	5	–	1	–	0	9	–	1	–	1
Texas	4	–	1	–	1	7	–	2	–	1
SMU	3	–	2	–	1	8	–	2	–	2
TCU	3	–	3	–	0	8	–	4	–	0
Arkansas	2	–	3	–	1	4	–	4	–	2
Texas A&M	1	–	4	–	1	2	–	7	–	2
Baylor	1	–	5	–	0	3	–	7	–	0
$ – Conference champion; Rankings from Dickinson System

The 1934 Rice Owls football team was an American football team that represented Rice Institute as a member of the Southwest Conference (SWC) during the 1934 college football season. In its first season under head coach Jimmy Kitts, the team compiled a 9–1–1 record (5–1 against SWC opponents), won the conference championship, and outscored opponents by a total of 204 to 44.

== Schedule ==
Date	Opponent	Site	Result	Attendance	Source
September 22	at Loyola (LA)*	Loyola Stadium; New Orleans, LA	W 12–0	8,000	
September 29	LSU*	Rice Field; Houston, TX	T 9–9		
October 6	at Purdue*	Ross–Ade Stadium; West Lafayette, IN	W 14–0	12,000	
October 13	SMU	Rice Field; Houston, TX (rivalry)	W 9–0	14,000	
October 20	at Creighton*	Creighton Stadium; Omaha, NE	W 47–13	10,000	
October 27	Texas	Rice Field; Houston, TX (rivalry)	W 20–9	18,000	
November 3	Texas A&I*	Rice Field; Houston, TX	W 27–0	7,000	
November 10	at Arkansas	The Hill; Fayetteville, AR	W 7–0		
November 17	at Texas A&M	Kyle Field; College Station, TX	W 25–6		
November 24	TCU	Rice Field; Houston, TX	L 2–7		
December 1	at Baylor	Carroll Field; Waco, TX	W 32–0	8,000	
*Non-conference game
