= 1936 Baylor Bears football team =

American college football season

1936 Baylor Bears football
- Conference: Southwest Conference
- Record: 6–3–1 (3–2–1 SWC)
- Head coach: Morley Jennings (11th season)
- Captain: Lloyd Russell
- Home stadium: Waco Stadium

1936 Southwest Conference football standings
	Conf.					Overall
Team	W		L		T	W		L		T
No. 18 Arkansas $	5	–	1	–	0	7	–	3	–	0
No. 16 TCU	4	–	1	–	1	9	–	2	–	2
Texas A&M	3	–	2	–	1	8	–	3	–	1
Baylor	3	–	2	–	1	6	–	3	–	1
SMU	2	–	3	–	1	5	–	4	–	1
Rice	1	–	5	–	0	5	–	7	–	0
Texas	1	–	5	–	0	2	–	6	–	1
$ – Conference champion; Rankings from AP Poll

The 1936 Baylor Bears football team represented Baylor University in the Southwest Conference (SWC) during the 1936 college football season. In their 11th season under head coach Morley Jennings, the Bears compiled a 6–3–1 record (3–2–1 against conference opponents), tied for third place in the conference, and outscored opponents by a combined total of 128 to 90. They played their home games at Waco Stadium in Waco, Texas. Lloyd O. Russell was the team captain.

== Schedule ==
Date	Opponent	Site	Result	Attendance	Source
September 26	Hardin–Simmons*	Waco Stadium; Waco, TX	W 13–0		
October 3	vs. Centenary*	Rose Festival Stadium; Tyler, TX	L 0–10	12,000	
October 10	at Arkansas	The Hill; Fayetteville, AR	L 10–14		
October 17	at Texas	War Memorial Stadium; Austin, TX (rivalry)	W 21–18		
October 24	No. 14 Texas A&M^{†}	Waco Stadium; Waco, TX (rivalry)	T 0–0	7,000	
October 31	at TCU	Amon G. Carter Stadium; Fort Worth, TX (rivalry)	L 0–28	10,000	
November 7	Oklahoma City*	Waco Stadium; Waco, TX	W 48–6		
November 14	at Oklahoma A&M*	Lewis Field; Stillwater, OK	W 13–0		
November 21	SMU	Waco Stadium; Waco, TX	W 13–7		
November 28	at Rice	Rice Field; Houston, TX	W 10–7		
*Non-conference game; ^{†}Homecoming; Rankings from Coaches' Poll released prior to the game
