= 1934 Texas Longhorns football team =

American college football season

1934 Texas Longhorns football
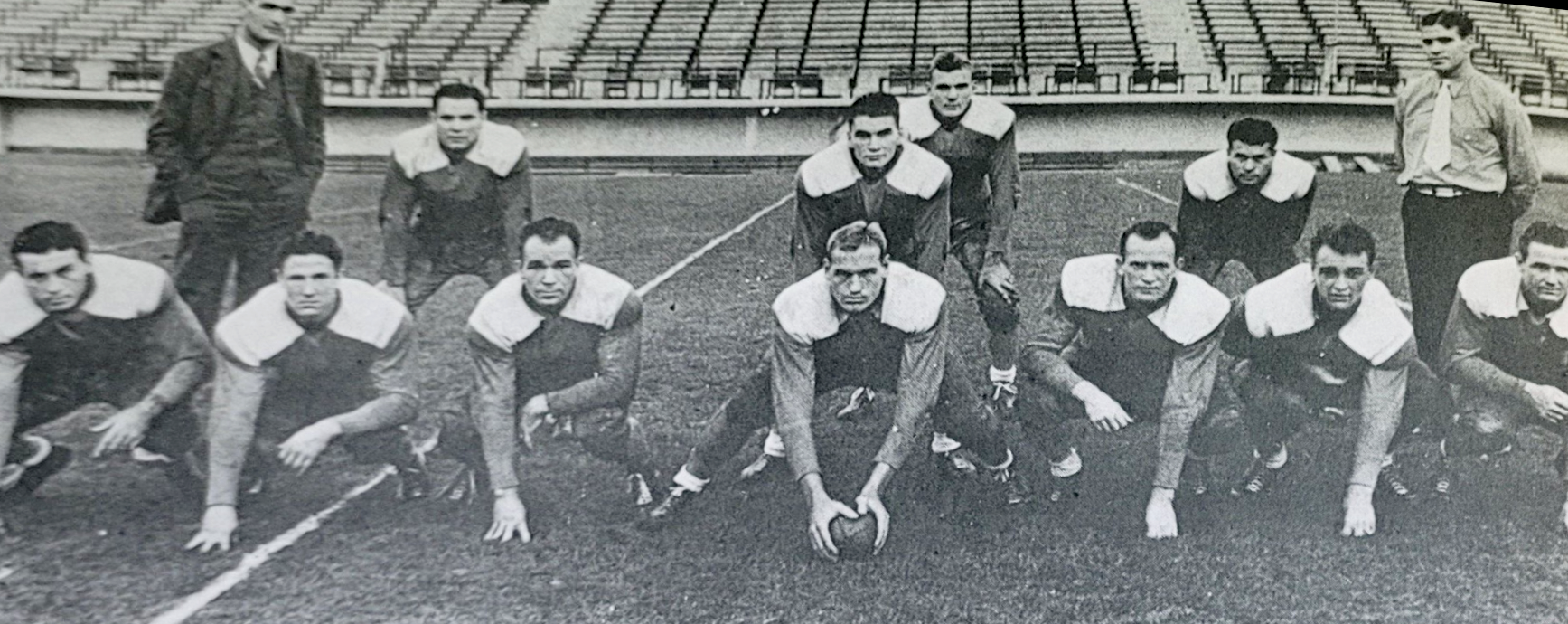
- Conference: Southwest Conference
- Record: 7–2–1 (4–1–1 SWC)
- Head coach: Jack Chevigny (1st season)
- Captains: Charles Coates; Bohn Hilliard
- Home stadium: War Memorial Stadium

1934 Southwest Conference football standings
	Conf.					Overall
Team	W		L		T	W		L		T
No. 5 Rice $	5	–	1	–	0	9	–	1	–	1
Texas	4	–	1	–	1	7	–	2	–	1
SMU	3	–	2	–	1	8	–	2	–	2
TCU	3	–	3	–	0	8	–	4	–	0
Arkansas	2	–	3	–	1	4	–	4	–	2
Texas A&M	1	–	4	–	1	2	–	7	–	2
Baylor	1	–	5	–	0	3	–	7	–	0
$ – Conference champion; Rankings from Dickinson System

The 1934 Texas Longhorns football team was an American football team that represented the University of Texas (now known as the University of Texas at Austin) as a member of the Southwest Conference (SWC) during the 1934 college football season. In their first year under head coach Jack Chevigny, the Longhorns compiled an overall record of 7–2–1, with a mark of 4–1–1 in conference play, and finished second in the SWC.

== Schedule ==
Date	Opponent	Site	Result	Attendance	Source
September 22	at Texas Tech*	Tech Field; Lubbock, TX (rivalry)	W 12–6	9,000	
October 6	at Notre Dame*	Notre Dame Stadium; Notre Dame, IN	W 7–6	33,000	
October 13	vs. Oklahoma*	Fair Park Stadium; Dallas, TX (rivalry)	W 19–0	21,000	
October 20	Centenary*	War Memorial Stadium; Austin, TX	L 6–9	10,000	
October 27	at Rice	Rice Field; Houston, TX (rivalry)	L 9–20	18,000	
November 3	SMU	War Memorial Stadium; Austin, TX	T 7–7		
November 10	Baylor	War Memorial Stadium; Austin, TX (rivalry)	W 25–6		
November 17	at TCU	Amon G. Carter Stadium; Fort Worth, TX (rivalry)	W 20–19		
November 23	at Arkansas	The Hill; Fayetteville, AR (rivalry)	W 19–12	4,000	
November 28	Texas A&M	War Memorial Stadium; Austin, TX (rivalry)	W 13–0	20,000	
*Non-conference game

== Season summary ==
=== Notre Dame ===
Week 2: Texas at Notre Dame

Team	1	2	3	4	Total
• Texas	7	0	0	0	7
Notre Dame	0	6	0	0	6

- Date: October 6
- Location: Notre Dame, IN
- Game attendance: 33,000
- Referee: Frank Birch (Earlham)

Scoring summary
Q1	TX	Bohn Hilliard 8-yard run (Hilliard Kick)	TEX 7–0
Q2	ND	George Melinkovich 1-yard run (Kick failed)	TEX 7–6

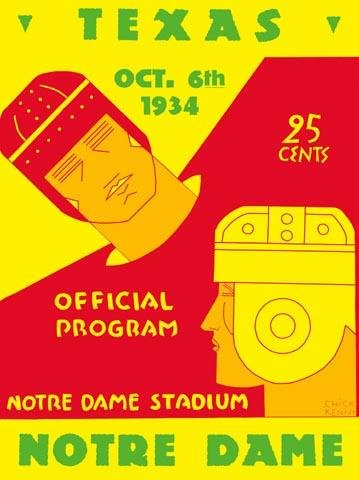
Program for the October 6 game vs. Notre Dame

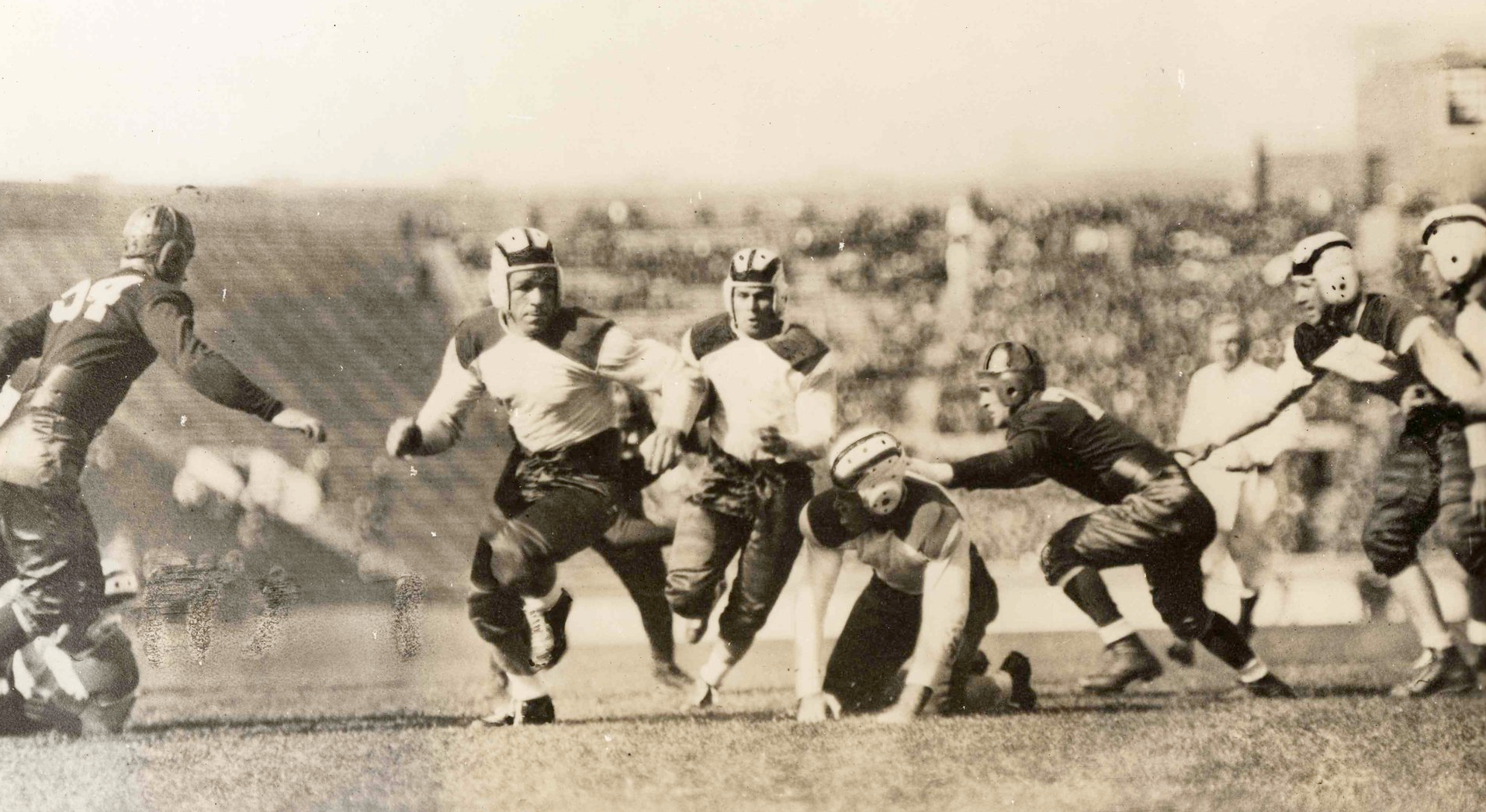
Bohn Hilliard scoring what proved to be the game winning touchdown.

On October 6, 1934, the Texas Longhorns and Notre Dame Fighting Irish played their third match up between the two programs, and the first since 1915. Notre Dame had offered the Horns $5,000 dollars for the showdown in South Bend which the athletic department accepted. Texas' new head coach Jack Chevigny was a Notre Dame alum and claimed that legendary coach Knute Rockne had wanted him to be the next coach of the Irish before his fatal plane crash but Chevigny never got the call. Prior to the game Chevigny rallied his players and delivered a fiery speech that invoked Rockne, Chevingy's ill father, deceased mother (who was buried not too far from South Bend), and that he "was the heir to the throne...that a great man's wish didn't come true...that [the team] could make up for it by defeating Notre Dame that day." J. Neils Thompson, a multi-sport athlete who was present during the 1934 game recalled "[We had] never heard anything like it. But the speech had its impact, and we all went out."

Prior to, the Horns had devised a plan to shock the Irish at the opening of the game. In the summer of 1934, Notre Dame's regular right halfback died and Coach Chevigny reasoned that his inexperienced replacement might be nervous during the season opener. In preparation, Texas practiced kickoffs to the deep return man hoping that in the real game he might make a mistake under the pressure.

In front of 33,000 fans, Texas won the toss and elected to kickoff. At the last second the Irish's star Back; George Melinkovich, switched positions with the newcomer but in his haste fumbled the return. Texas' Jack Gray captured the fumble at the Notre Dame 18. While Chevigny's gambit hadn't worked out the way it was planned the result was still the same and four plays later Bohn Hilliard followed guard Joe Smartt into the endzone for the touchdown and followed it up by kicking the extra point himself. The remainder of the game was a defensive struggle whose only interruption came midway through the second quarter when Notre Dame was punting the ball from their 32. The ball stuck the ground at Buster Baebel's, the Texas Quarterback, feet and while he picked it up he was rocked by a tackle from John Michuta, ND Tackle, and the ball flew out of his hands and was recovered by Notre Dame on the Texas 9 yard line. On fourth & one from the goal line, Melinkovich crashed over the line for what would've been the game tying touchdown, however Wayne Millner missed the ensuing extra point leaving Texas ahead 7-6. Halftime saw a dedication to the memory of Johnny Young, the ND halfback who had died that summer in Houston, Texas. Following halftime neither team found the end zone again but not due to lack of cohesion, the game was characterized by hard-hitting and fast running throughout.

The loss was Notre Dame's first season opening loss since 1896 to the Chicago Physicians and Texas' first ever victory over the Irish. This game and Rice's upset over Purdue the same day signaled the rise of Southwest football's golden age had arrived. The Texas starting lineup for the game against Notre Dame was Jack Gray (left end), Tolbert (left tackle), Woodrow Wier (left guard), Charles Coates (center), Joe Smartt (right guard), Louis Oliver (right tackle), Phil Sanger (right end), Jimmy Hadlock (quarterback), Bohn Hilliard (left halfback), Bill Pitzer Narick (right halfback) and Irwin Gilbreath (fullback). Substitutes appearing in the game for Texas were Buster Baebel, Gillem Ingerton, Hugh Wolfe, and Fred Beasley.
