= 1933 SMU Mustangs football team =

American college football season

1933 SMU Mustangs football
- Conference: Southwest Conference
- Record: 4–7–1 (2–4 SWC)
- Head coach: Ray Morrison (14th season)
- Captain: Ray Fuqua
- Home stadium: Ownby Stadium, Fair Park Stadium

1933 Southwest Conference football standings
	Conf.					Overall
Team	W		L		T	W		L		T
Arkansas	4	–	1	–	0	7	–	3	–	1
TCU	4	–	2	–	0	9	–	2	–	1
Baylor	4	–	2	–	0	6	–	4	–	0
Texas A&M	2	–	2	–	1	6	–	3	–	1
Texas	2	–	3	–	1	4	–	5	–	2
SMU	2	–	4	–	0	4	–	7	–	1
Rice	1	–	5	–	0	3	–	8	–	0
Because of an ineligible played used by Arkansas, no championship was awarded.

The 1933 SMU Mustangs football team represented Southern Methodist University (SMU) as a member of the Southwest Conference (SWC) during the 1933 college football season. Led by 14th-year head coach Ray Morrison, the Mustangs compiled an overall record of 4–7–1 with a mark of 2–4 in conference play, placing sixth in the SWC.

== Schedule ==
Date	Time	Opponent	Site	Result	Attendance	Source
September 23		North Texas State Teachers*	Ownby Stadium; University Park, TX (rivalry)	L 0–7		
September 29		at Texas Tech*	Tech Field; Lubbock, TX	W 14–0	6,000	
October 7		Texas Mines*	Ownby Stadium; University Park, TX	W 27–6	30,000	
October 14		at Rice	Rice Field; Houston, TX (rivalry)	W 13–7		
October 21	3:00 p.m.	Oklahoma A&M*	Fair Park Stadium; Dallas, TX	T 7–7		
October 28		at Arkansas	The Hill; Fayetteville, AR	L 0–3	6,000	
November 4		Texas	Ownby Stadium; University Park, TX	L 0–10		
November 11		at Texas A&M	Kyle Field; College Station, TX	W 19–0		
November 18		at Centenary*	Centenary College Stadium; Shreveport, LA	L 0–7	8,000	
November 25		Baylor	Ownby Stadium; University Park, TX	L 7–13		
December 2		at TCU	Amon G. Carter Stadium; Fort Worth, TX (rivalry)	L 6–26	10,000	
December 9		at Saint Mary's*	Kezar Stadium; San Francisco, CA	L 6–18	25,000	
*Non-conference game; All times are in Central time
