= 1933 Texas A&M Aggies football team =

American college football season

1933 Texas A&M Aggies football
- Conference: Southwest Conference
- Record: 6–3–1 (2–2–1 SWC)
- Head coach: Matty Bell (5th season)
- Home stadium: Kyle Field

1933 Southwest Conference football standings
| | Conf. | | | | | Overall |
| Team | W | | L | | T | W | | L | | T |
|---|---|---|---|---|---|---|---|---|---|---|
| Arkansas | 4 | – | 1 | – | 0 | 7 | – | 3 | – | 1 |
| TCU | 4 | – | 2 | – | 0 | 9 | – | 2 | – | 1 |
| Baylor | 4 | – | 2 | – | 0 | 6 | – | 4 | – | 0 |
| Texas A&M | 2 | – | 2 | – | 1 | 6 | – | 3 | – | 1 |
| Texas | 2 | – | 3 | – | 1 | 4 | – | 5 | – | 2 |
| SMU | 2 | – | 4 | – | 0 | 4 | – | 7 | – | 1 |
| Rice | 1 | – | 5 | – | 0 | 3 | – | 8 | – | 0 |
Because of an ineligible played used by Arkansas, no championship was awarded.

The 1933 Texas A&M Aggies football team represented the Agricultural and Mechanical College of Texas—now known as Texas A&M University—in the Southwest Conference (SWC) during the 1933 college football season. In its fifth season under head coach Matty Bell, the team compiled an overall record of 6–3–1, with a mark of 2–2–1 in conference play, and finished fourth in the SWC.

== Schedule ==
| Date | Opponent | Site | Result | Attendance | Source |
|---|---|---|---|---|---|
| September 23 | Trinity (TX)* | Kyle Field; College Station, TX | W 38–0 | | |
| September 30 | at Tulane* | Tulane Stadium; New Orleans, LA | W 13–6 | | |
| October 6 | at Sam Houston State* | Pritchett Field; Huntsville, TX | W 34–14 | | |
| October 13 | vs. Texas A&I* | Eagle Field; San Antonio, TX | W 17–0 | | |
| October 21 | at TCU | Amon G. Carter Stadium; Fort Worth, TX (rivalry) | L 7–13 | | |
| October 28 | Baylor | Kyle Field; College Station, TX (rivalry) | W 14–7 | 7,000 | |
| November 4 | at Centenary* | Centenary College Stadium; Shreveport, LA | L 0–20 | | |
| November 11 | SMU | Kyle Field; College Station, TX | L 0–19 | | |
| November 18 | at Rice | Rice Field; Houston, TX | W 27–0 | 10,000 | |
| November 30 | Texas | Kyle Field; College Station, TX (rivalry) | T 10–10 | | |
*Non-conference game
