= 1933 Simmons Cowboys football team =

American college football season

1933 Simmons Cowboys football
- Conference: Texas Conference
- Record: 3–6–1 (1–2–1 Texas)
- Head coach: Les Cranfill (3rd season)

1933 Texas Conference football standings
	Conf.					Overall
Team	W		L		T	W		L		T
St. Edward's $	5	–	1	–	0	7	–	2	–	0
Howard Payne	4	–	2	–	0	5	–	3	–	1
Abilene Christian *	2	–	1	–	2	5	–	3	–	2
McMurry	3	–	2	–	0	4	–	4	–	2
Austin	1	–	2	–	2	1	–	6	–	2
Simmons (TX)	1	–	2	–	1	4	–	5	–	1
Southwestern (TX)	1	–	4	–	1	1	–	8	–	2
Daniel Baker	0	–	4	–	2	0	–	7	–	2
$ – Conference champion; * – Abilene Christian's game against Texas A&I counted in conference standings even though Texas A&I was not a conference member.

The 1933 Simmons Cowboys football team represented Simmons University—now known as Hardin–Simmons University—as a member of the Texas Conference during 1933 college football season. Led by Les Cranfill in his fourth season as head coach, the team went 3–6–1 overall with a conference mark of 1–2–1.

== Schedule ==
Date	Time	Opponent	Site	Result	Attendance	Source
September 22		at Dixie (TX)*	Steer Stadium; Dallas, TX	W 17–6		
September 29		at West Texas State*	Buffalo Stadium; Canyon, TX	W 6–0		
October 6	8:00 p.m.	at St. Edward's	House Park; Austin, TX	L 0–13		
October 14		at TCU*	Amon G. Carter Stadium; Fort Worth, TX	L 0–20		
October 21		at Baylor*	Carroll Field; Waco, TX	L 0–21		
October 27		Southwestern (TX)	Parramore Field; Abilene, TX	W 23–0		
November 11		at Texas Tech*	Tech Field; Lubbock, TX	L 0–7	6,500	
November 18		at Texas Mines*	Kidd Field; El Paso, TX	L 0–10		
November 25		at Howard Payne	Brownwood, TX	L 0–6		
November 30		at Daniel Baker	Brownwood, TX	T 0–0		
*Non-conference game; All times are in Central time
