= L. D. Meyer =

American baseball player (1915–2003)

Dutch Meyer
- Second baseman
- Born: October 7, 1915; Waco, Texas, U.S.
- Died: January 19, 2003 (aged 87); Fort Worth, Texas, U.S.
- Batted: Right Threw: Right

MLB debut
- June 23, 1937, for the Chicago Cubs

Last MLB appearance
- September 22, 1946, for the Cleveland Indians

MLB statistics
- Batting average: .264
- Home runs: 10
- Runs batted in: 93
- Stats at Baseball Reference

Teams
- Chicago Cubs (1937); Detroit Tigers (1940–1942); Cleveland Indians (1945–1946)

Lambert Daniel "Little Dutch" Meyer (October 7, 1915 – January 19, 2003) was an American college football player and professional baseball player and manager, as well as the nephew of the famous and similarly named Texas Christian University football coach Leo "Dutch" Meyer.

A native of Waco, Texas, Meyer played baseball and football at TCU in the 1930s. On the gridiron, he was the favorite target of future Hall of Fame Quarterback Sammy Baugh. He kicked the winning field goal in the famous 3-2 TCU victory over LSU in the 1936 Sugar Bowl. The next year, he scored all the points in TCU's 16–6 victory over Marquette in the Cotton Bowl Classic.

Young Dutch took up a career in baseball upon graduating TCU. A right-handed batter and thrower, he stood 5 feet 10 inches (1.78 m) tall and weighed 181 pounds (82 kg). He split his first pro season, 1937, between the Knoxville Smokies of the Class A1 Southern Association and the Chicago Cubs of Major League Baseball. On June 23, he made his Major League debut as a pinch runner for the Cubs. The Detroit Tigers bought his contract in 1940, and he spent the next three seasons bouncing between Detroit and the minor league Buffalo Bisons.

In 1942, Meyer left baseball to serve in World War II, joining the U.S. Army Air Corps. When he was discharged in 1945, he rejoined the Tigers who traded him to the Cleveland Indians. That season was Dutch's best, as he led the Indians in hits with 153 with an average of .292. After the 1947 season, he was traded to the New York Yankees, who demoted him to the minors.

After a few more seasons playing in the minors, he became a manager, making stops in Gladewater, Texas, Dallas, Tulsa, Oklahoma, and Fayetteville, North Carolina. With the Dallas Eagles in 1952, he coached Dave Hoskins, the first African-American player in the minor league Texas League.

While managing in Tulsa in 1955, Meyer got into a serious argument with a young Roger Maris. Maris was in a terrible slump and Meyer devised a series of drills to help his youthful right fielder, but Maris refused to do them. Meyer kicked Maris off the team, and was subsequently fired. Six years later Maris would break Babe Ruth's single-season home run record with the Yankees.

After retiring from baseball in 1956, Meyer also had a career in the oil and Insurance businesses. He died on January 19, 2003, in Fort Worth, Texas.
