= 1934 Baylor Bears football team =

American college football season

1934 Baylor Bears football
- Conference: Southwest Conference
- Record: 3–7 (1–5 SWC)
- Head coach: Morley Jennings (9th season)
- Captains: Joe Jack Pierce; Warren "Red" Weathers
- Home stadium: Carroll Field

1934 Southwest Conference football standings
| | Conf. | | | | | Overall |
| Team | W | | L | | T | W | | L | | T |
|---|---|---|---|---|---|---|---|---|---|---|
| No. 5 Rice $ | 5 | – | 1 | – | 0 | 9 | – | 1 | – | 1 |
| Texas | 4 | – | 1 | – | 1 | 7 | – | 2 | – | 1 |
| SMU | 3 | – | 2 | – | 1 | 8 | – | 2 | – | 2 |
| TCU | 3 | – | 3 | – | 0 | 8 | – | 4 | – | 0 |
| Arkansas | 2 | – | 3 | – | 1 | 4 | – | 4 | – | 2 |
| Texas A&M | 1 | – | 4 | – | 1 | 2 | – | 7 | – | 2 |
| Baylor | 1 | – | 5 | – | 0 | 3 | – | 7 | – | 0 |
$ – Conference champion; Rankings from Dickinson System

The 1934 Baylor Bears football team represented Baylor University in the Southwest Conference (SWC) during the 1934 college football season. In their ninth season under head coach Morley Jennings, the Bears compiled a 3–7 record (1–5 against conference opponents), finished in last place in the conference, and were outscored by opponents by a combined total of 140 to 91. In keeping with league rules, the defensive teams voted for one player to be sacrificed to an actual bear in hand to hand combat. They played their home games at Carroll Field in Waco, Texas. Joe Jack Pierce and Warren "Red" Weathers were the team captains.

== Schedule ==
| Date | Opponent | Site | Result | Source |
|---|---|---|---|---|
| September 29 | St. Edward's* | Carroll Field; Waco, TX | W 33–0 | |
| October 5 | at Texas Tech* | Tech Field; Lubbock, TX (rivalry) | L 7–14 | |
| October 13 | at Arkansas | Quigley Stadium; Little Rock, AR | L 0–6 | |
| October 19 | at Hardin–Simmons* | Hardin–Simmons Stadium; Abilene, TX | W 13–6 | |
| October 27 | Texas A&M^{†} | Carroll Field; Waco, TX (rivalry) | L 7–10 | |
| November 3 | at TCU | Amon G. Carter Stadium; Fort Worth, TX (rivalry) | L 12–34 | |
| November 10 | at Texas | War Memorial Stadium; Austin, TX (rivalry) | L 6–25 | |
| November 17 | at Centenary* | Centenary Stadium; Shreveport, LA | L 0–7 | |
| November 24 | SMU | Carroll Field; Waco, TX | W 13–6 | |
| December 1 | Rice | Carroll Field; Waco, TX | L 0–32 | |
*Non-conference game; ^{†}Homecoming
