= 1936 Southwest Texas State Bobcats football team =

American college football season

1936 Southwest Texas State Bobcats football
- Conference: Lone Star Conference
- Record: 3–5–1 (1–3 LSC)
- Head coach: Joe Bailey Cheaney (2nd season)
- Home stadium: Evans Field

1936 Lone Star Conference football standings
	Conf.					Overall
Team	W		L		T	W		L		T
North Texas State $	4	–	0	–	0	6	–	2	–	1
East Texas State	3	–	1	–	0	8	–	2	–	0
Stephen F. Austin	2	–	2	–	0	4	–	3	–	1
Southwest Texas State	1	–	3	–	0	3	–	5	–	1
Sam Houston State	0	–	4	–	0	2	–	7	–	0
$ – Conference champion

The 1936 Southwest Texas State Bobcats football team was an American football team that represented Southwest Texas State Teachers College (now known as Texas State University) during the 1936 college football season as a member of the Lone Star Conference (LSC). In their second year under head coach Joe Bailey Cheaney, the team compiled an overall record of 3–5–1 with a mark of 1–3 in conference play.

== Schedule ==
Date	Opponent	Site	Result	Source
September 19	23rd Infantry*	Evans Field; San Marcos, TX	W 12–6	
September 25	Howard Payne*	Evans Field; San Marcos, TX	L 0–44	
October 2	Schreiner*	Evans Field; San Marcos, TX	L 6–36	
October 9	at Stephen F. Austin	Nacogdoches, TX	L 7–14	
October 16	Southwestern (TX)*	Evans Field; San Marcos, TX	W 13–0	
October 23	at Daniel Baker*	Brownwood, TX	T 6–6	
November 6	at Sam Houston State	Pritchett Field; Huntsville, TX (rivalry)	W 14–0	
November 14	East Texas State	Evans Field; San Marcos, TX	L 13–14	
November 20	at North Texas State Teachers	Eagle Field; Denton, TX	L 0–14	
*Non-conference game
