= 1936 North Texas State Teachers Eagles football team =

American college football season

1936 North Texas State Teachers Eagles football

LSC champion
- Conference: Lone Star Conference
- Record: 6–2–1 (4–0 LSC)
- Head coach: Jack Sisco (8th season)
- Home stadium: Eagle Field

1936 Lone Star Conference football standings
| | Conf. | | | | | Overall |
| Team | W | | L | | T | W | | L | | T |
|---|---|---|---|---|---|---|---|---|---|---|
| North Texas State $ | 4 | – | 0 | – | 0 | 6 | – | 2 | – | 1 |
| East Texas State | 3 | – | 1 | – | 0 | 8 | – | 2 | – | 0 |
| Stephen F. Austin | 2 | – | 2 | – | 0 | 4 | – | 3 | – | 1 |
| Southwest Texas State | 1 | – | 3 | – | 0 | 3 | – | 5 | – | 1 |
| Sam Houston State | 0 | – | 4 | – | 0 | 2 | – | 7 | – | 0 |
$ – Conference champion

The 1936 North Texas State Teachers Eagles football team was an American football team that represented the North Texas State Teachers College (now known as the University of North Texas) during the 1936 college football season as a member of the Lone Star Conference. In their eighth year under head coach Jack Sisco, the team compiled a 6–2–1 record.

== Schedule ==
| Date | Opponent | Site | Result | Source |
|---|---|---|---|---|
| September 26 | at SMU* | Ownby Stadium; University Park, TX (rivalry) | L 0–6 | |
| October 3 | at Southwestern (TX)* | Georgetown, TX | L 7–12 | |
| October 9 | Abilene Christian* | Eagle Field; Denton, TX | W 18–0 | |
| October 16 | Stephen F. Austin | Eagle Field; Denton, TX | W 27–7 | |
| October 22 | at Austin* | Sherman, TX | T 0–0 | |
| October 30 | at Sam Houston State | Pritchett Field; Huntsville, TX | W 27–7 | |
| November 6 | at East Texas State | Lion Stadium; Commerce, TX | W 6–0 | |
| November 13 | Trinity (TX)* | Eagle Field; Denton, TX | W 26–6 | |
| November 20 | Southwest Texas State | Eagle Field; Denton, TX | W 14–0 | |
*Non-conference game
