= 1936 Texas A&M Aggies football team =

American college football season

1936 Texas A&M Aggies football
- Conference: Southwest Conference
- Record: 8–3–1 (3–2–1 SWC)
- Head coach: Homer Norton (3rd season)
- Home stadium: Kyle Field

1936 Southwest Conference football standings
	Conf.					Overall
Team	W		L		T	W		L		T
No. 18 Arkansas $	5	–	1	–	0	7	–	3	–	0
No. 16 TCU	4	–	1	–	1	9	–	2	–	2
Texas A&M	3	–	2	–	1	8	–	3	–	1
Baylor	3	–	2	–	1	6	–	3	–	1
SMU	2	–	3	–	1	5	–	4	–	1
Rice	1	–	5	–	0	5	–	7	–	0
Texas	1	–	5	–	0	2	–	6	–	1
$ – Conference champion; Rankings from AP Poll

The 1936 Texas A&M Aggies football team represented the Agricultural and Mechanical College of Texas—now known as Texas A&M University—in the Southwest Conference (SWC) during the 1936 college football season. In its third season under head coach Homer Norton, the team compiled an overall record of 8–3–1, with a mark of 3–2–1 in conference play, and finished third in the SWC.

== Schedule ==
Date	Opponent	Rank	Site	Result	Attendance	Source
September 26	Sam Houston State*		Kyle Field; College Station, TX	W 39–6		
October 3	vs. Hardin–Simmons*		Coyote Stadium; Wichita Falls, TX	W 3–0	6,000	
October 10	at Rice		Rice Field; Houston, TX	W 3–0	14,000	
October 17	TCU		Kyle Field; College Station, TX (rivalry)	W 18–7		
October 24	at Baylor	No. 14	Waco Stadium; Waco, TX (rivalry)	T 0–0	7,000	
October 31	Arkansas		Kyle Field; College Station, TX (rivalry)	L 0–18		
November 7	at No. 12 SMU		Ownby Stadium; University Park, TX	W 22–6	26,000	
November 11	at San Francisco*	No. 15	Kezar Stadium; San Francisco, CA	W 38–14		
November 14	at Utah*	No. 15	Ute Stadium; Salt Lake City, UT	W 20–7		
November 21	at Centenary*	No. 14	Centenary Field; Shreveport, LA	L 0–3		
November 26	Texas		Kyle Field; College Station, TX (rivalry)	L 0–7		
December 5	vs. Manhattan*		Lion Stadium; Tyler, TX	W 13–6	6,000	
*Non-conference game; Rankings from AP Poll released prior to the game
