= 1933 Rice Owls football team =

American college football season

1933 Rice Owls football
- Conference: Southwest Conference
- Record: 3–8 (1–5 SWC)
- Head coach: Jack Meagher (5th season)
- Home stadium: Rice Field

1933 Southwest Conference football standings
	Conf.					Overall
Team	W		L		T	W		L		T
Arkansas	4	–	1	–	0	7	–	3	–	1
TCU	4	–	2	–	0	9	–	2	–	1
Baylor	4	–	2	–	0	6	–	4	–	0
Texas A&M	2	–	2	–	1	6	–	3	–	1
Texas	2	–	3	–	1	4	–	5	–	2
SMU	2	–	4	–	0	4	–	7	–	1
Rice	1	–	5	–	0	3	–	8	–	0
Because of an ineligible played used by Arkansas, no championship was awarded.

The 1933 Rice Owls football team was an American football team that represented Rice Institute as a member of the Southwest Conference (SWC) during the 1933 college football season. In its fifth and final season under head coach Jack Meagher, the team compiled a 3–8 record (1–5 against SWC opponents) and was outscored by a total of 137 to 56.

== Schedule ==
Date	Opponent	Site	Result	Attendance	Source
September 23	Texas A&I*	Rice Field; Houston, TX	W 7–0		
September 30	at LSU*	Tiger Stadium; Baton Rouge, LA	L 0–13		
October 7	Loyola (LA)*	Rice Field; Houston, TX	W 13–0	5,000	
October 14	SMU	Rice Field; Houston, TX (rivalry)	L 7–13		
October 21	at Creighton*	Creighton Stadium; Omaha, NE	L 13–14		
October 28	at Texas	War Memorial Stadium; Austin, TX (rivalry)	L 0–18		
November 4	at Santa Clara*	Kezar Stadium; San Francisco, CA	L 0–13	15,000	
November 11	Arkansas	Rice Field; Houston, TX	W 7–6		
November 18	Texas A&M	Rice Field; Houston, TX	L 0–27	10,000	
November 25	at TCU	Amon G. Carter Stadium; Fort Worth, TX	L 3–26		
December 2	at Baylor	Carroll Field; Waco, TX	L 6–7		
*Non-conference game
