= 1933 Arkansas Razorbacks football team =

American college football season

1933 Arkansas Razorbacks football

Dixie Classic, T 7–7 vs. Centenary
- Conference: Southwest Conference
- Record: 7–3–1 (4–1 SWC)
- Head coach: Fred Thomsen (5th season)
- Captain: Lewis Johnson
- Home stadium: The Hill, Quigley Stadium

1933 Southwest Conference football standings
	Conf.					Overall
Team	W		L		T	W		L		T
Arkansas	4	–	1	–	0	7	–	3	–	1
TCU	4	–	2	–	0	9	–	2	–	1
Baylor	4	–	2	–	0	6	–	4	–	0
Texas A&M	2	–	2	–	1	6	–	3	–	1
Texas	2	–	3	–	1	4	–	5	–	2
SMU	2	–	4	–	0	4	–	7	–	1
Rice	1	–	5	–	0	3	–	8	–	0
Because of an ineligible played used by Arkansas, no championship was awarded.

The 1933 Arkansas Razorbacks football team represented the University of Arkansas as a member of the Southwest Conference (SWC) during the 1933 college football season. In their fifth year under head coach Fred Thomsen, the Razorbacks compiled an overall record of 7–3–1 with a mark of 4–1 in conference play and outscored their opponents by a combined total of 213 to 61. Arkansas was invited to the Dixie Classic, where they tied Centenary.

Arkansas finished first in the SWC, but because the Razorbacks had used an ineligible player, conference officials voted not to recognize a champion for the 1933 season. Ulysses "Heine" Schlueter had told Coach Thomsen that he had remaining eligibility, but had played at the University of Nebraska in 1931 and at the Kemper Military School in 1932. Schlueter status came into question when a student at Southern Methodist University (SMU) saw a newspaper photograph of Schlueter and recognized him as a former Cornhusker.

== Schedule ==
Date	Opponent	Site	Result	Attendance	Source
September 23	Ozarks*	The Hill; Fayetteville, AR	W 40–0		
September 30	Oklahoma Baptist*	The Hill; Fayetteville, AR	W 42–7		
October 7	TCU	The Hill; Fayetteville, AR	W 13–0		
October 14	Baylor	Quigley Stadium; Little Rock, AR	W 19–7		
October 21	vs. LSU*	State Fair Stadium; Shreveport, LA (rivalry)	L 0–20	15,000	
October 28	SMU^{†}	The Hill; Fayetteville, AR	W 3–0	6,000	
November 11	at Rice	Rice Field; Houston, TX	L 6–7		
November 18	Hendrix*	The Hill; Fayetteville, AR	W 63–0		
November 24	at Texas	War Memorial Stadium; Austin, TX (rivalry)	W 20–6		
November 30	at Tulsa*	Skelly Field; Tulsa, OK	L 0–7	18,000	
January 1	vs. Centenary*	Fair Park; Dallas, TX (Dixie Classic)	T 7–7	8,000	
*Non-conference game; ^{†}Homecoming

== Dixie Classic ==
The Dixie Classic was the first bowl appearance in Arkansas Razorbacks history. Their opponent, Centenary, was undefeated in the regular season. The game, played in Dallas, was the final Dixie Classic, a predecessor to the Cotton Bowl Classic. The Razorbacks dented the scoreboard first, on a 24-yard hookup from Tom Murphy to Elvin Geiser in the second quarter. The Gentlemen returned with a 20-yard touchdown pass, but missed the extra point to give Arkansas a 7–6 lead. However, a Razorback was called offside, the down was replayed, and Centenary's kicker Chester Weidman's kick was true.

	1	2	3	4	Total
Razorbacks	0	7	0	0	7
Gentlemen	0	7	0	0	7

Scoring summary

Quarter	Time	Drive			Team	Scoring information	Score	
Quarter	Time	Plays	Yards	TOP	Team	Scoring information	ARK	CEN
2					ARK	Elvin Geiser 24-yard touchdown reception from Tom Murphy, Elvin Geiser kick good	7	0
2					CEN	Harold Olsin 20-yard touchdown reception from Manning Smith, Chester Weidman kick good	7	7
"TOP" = time of possession. For other American football terms, see Glossary of American football.							7	7
