= 1936 TCU Horned Frogs football team =

American college football season

1936 TCU Horned Frogs football

Cotton Bowl Classic champion

Cotton Bowl Classic, W 16–6 vs. Marquette
- Conference: Southwest Conference

Ranking
- AP: No. 16
- Record: 9–2–2 (4–1–1 SWC)
- Head coach: Dutch Meyer (3rd season)
- Offensive scheme: Meyer spread
- Home stadium: Amon G. Carter Stadium

1936 Southwest Conference football standings
	Conf.					Overall
Team	W		L		T	W		L		T
No. 18 Arkansas $	5	–	1	–	0	7	–	3	–	0
No. 16 TCU	4	–	1	–	1	9	–	2	–	2
Texas A&M	3	–	2	–	1	8	–	3	–	1
Baylor	3	–	2	–	1	6	–	3	–	1
SMU	2	–	3	–	1	5	–	4	–	1
Rice	1	–	5	–	0	5	–	7	–	0
Texas	1	–	5	–	0	2	–	6	–	1
$ – Conference champion; Rankings from AP Poll

The 1936 TCU Horned Frogs football team represented Texas Christian University (TCU) in the 1936 college football season. The team was coached by Dutch Meyer in his third year as coach, finishing the season 9–2–2 (4–1–1 SWC). Led by senior quarterback Sammy Baugh, the offense scored 160 points, while the defense allowed 58 points. The Frogs defeated Marquette in the inaugural Cotton Bowl Classic, played in Dallas.

The final AP poll was released in late November and TCU was sixteenth; they then defeated #6 Santa Clara on December 12, and #20 Marquette on New Year's Day. Baugh was a first round selection in the 1937 NFL Draft, taken sixth overall by the Boston Redskins, who moved south to Washington, D.C. prior to the 1937 season.

== Schedule ==
Date	Opponent	Rank	Site	Result	Attendance	Source
September 18	at Howard Payne*		Brownwood, TX	W 6–0		
September 26	at Texas Tech*		Tech Field; Lubbock, TX (rivalry)	L 0–7	12,000	
October 3	Arkansas		Amon G. Carter Stadium; Fort Worth, TX	W 18–14	12,000	
October 10	at Tulsa*		Skelly Field; Tulsa, OK	W 10–7	14,000	
October 17	at Texas A&M		Kyle Field; College Station, TX (rivalry)	L 7-18		
October 24	Mississippi State*		Cotton Bowl; Dallas, TX	T 0–0	6,000	
October 31	Baylor		Amon G. Carter Stadium; Fort Worth, TX (rivalry)	W 28–0	10,000	
November 7	at Texas		War Memorial Stadium; [Austin, TX (rivalry)	W 27–6	12,000	
November 14	Centenary*	No. 18	Amon G. Carter Stadium; Fort Worth, TX	W 26–0		
November 21	at Rice		Rice Field; Houston, TX	W 13–0	15,000	
November 28	at SMU	No. 18	Ownby Stadium; University Park, TX (rivalry)	T 0–0		
December 12	at No. 6 Santa Clara*	No. 16	Kezar Stadium; San Francisco, CA	W 9–0	45,000	
January 1, 1937	vs. No. 20 Marquette*	No. 16	Cotton Bowl; Dallas, TX (Cotton Bowl Classic)	W 16–6	15,000	
*Non-conference game; Rankings from AP Poll released prior to the game

== Team players drafted into the NFL ==
Player	Position	Round	Overall	NFL club
Sammy Baugh	Quarterback	1	6	Washington Redskins
Drew Ellis	Tackle	3	21	Philadelphia Eagles
Walt Roach	End	6	55	Pittsburgh Steelers
Marv Baldwin	Tackle	7	69	Green Bay Packers
Solon Holt	Guard	10	100	Los Angeles Rams

== Awards and honors ==
- Sammy Baugh, All-American selection
- Sammy Baugh, Cotton Bowl Classic Most Valuable Player
- Sammy Baugh, fourth in voting for the Heisman Trophy in 1936.
