= Fred Thomsen =

American football player and coach (1897–1986)

Biographical details
- Born: April 25, 1897; Minden, Nebraska, U.S.
- Died: January 7, 1986 (aged 88); Springfield, Missouri, U.S.

Playing career
- 1920–1923: Nebraska
- 1924: Rock Island Independents
- Position: End

Coaching career (HC unless noted)
- 1925–1926: Gothenburg HS (NE)
- 1927–1928: Arkansas (assistant)
- 1929–1941: Arkansas
- 1949–1952: Southwest Missouri State

Administrative career (AD unless noted)
- 1929–1942: Arkansas

Head coaching record
- Overall: 75–78–14 (college)
- Bowls: 0–0–1

Accomplishments and honors

Championships
- 1 SWC (1936); 1 MIAA (1951)

Fred Charles Thomsen (April 25, 1897 – January 7, 1986) was an American football player and coach. From 1929 to 1941, he was the head football coach at the University of Arkansas, compiling a record of 56–61–10. In 1949, he became the head football coach at Southwest Missouri State College, now Missouri State University, where he served until 1952. His record at Southwest Missouri State was 19–17–4. Thomsen's career record as a head coach was 75–78–4. Thomsen played for the Rock Island Independents in the National Football League (NFL) for one season in 1924.

== Arkansas ==
In 1933, Thomsen's Razorbacks had the best record in the Southwest Conference, but Arkansas had to forfeit their first conference championship because Thomsen played Heinie Schleuter, an ineligible athlete. Schleuter had told Thomsen he could play, but actually had no remaining eligibility. A member of the SMU Mustangs noticed him as a former Nebraska Cornhusker, forcing the Hogs to give up their first conference title. The Razorbacks won their first conference championship in 1936. However, TCU received the Southwest Conference's bid to the first Cotton Bowl, leaving Arkansas out of the bowl picture. Thomsen popularized the forward pass at Arkansas, attempting over 300 aerials, which caught fire across the Southwest Conference. Thomsen used two quarterbacks, Dwight Sloan for wet weather, and Jack Robbins for dry.

== Head coaching record ==
=== College ===
Year	Team	Overall	Conference	Standing	Bowl/playoffs	AP^{#}
Arkansas Razorbacks (Southwest Conference) (1929–1941)
1929	Arkansas	7–2	3–2	3rd		
1930	Arkansas	3–6	2–2	5th		
1931	Arkansas	3–5–1	0–4	7th		
1932	Arkansas	1–6–2	1–4	7th		
1933	Arkansas	7–3–1	4–1	1st (Note: Because of an ineligible player used by Arkansas, no championship was awarded by the Southwest Conference for the 1933 season.)	T Dixie Classic	
1934	Arkansas	4–4–2	2–3–1	5th		
1935	Arkansas	5–5	2–4	5th		
1936	Arkansas	7–3	5–1	1st		18
1937	Arkansas	6–2–2	3–2–1	3rd		14
1938	Arkansas	2–7–1	1–5	T–6th		
1939	Arkansas	4–5–1	2–3–1	5th		
1940	Arkansas	4–6	1–5	6th		
1941	Arkansas	3–7	0–6	7th		
Arkansas:		56–61–10	26–42–3			
Southwest Missouri State Bears (Missouri Intercollegiate Athletic Association) (1949–1952)
1949	Southwest Missouri State	5–4–1	3–1–1	T–2nd		
1950	Southwest Missouri State	5–4–2	3–1–1	2nd		
1951	Southwest Missouri State	6–3–1	4–0–1	T–1st		
1952	Southwest Missouri State	3–6	1–4	T–5th		
Southwest Missouri State:		19–17–4	11–6–3			
Total:		75–78–14				
National championship Conference title Conference division title or championship game berth
^{#}Rankings from final AP Poll.
