= 1933 Baylor Bears football team =

American college football season

1933 Baylor Bears football
- Conference: Southwest Conference
- Record: 6–4 (4–2 SWC)
- Head coach: Morley Jennings (8th season)
- Captains: Frank James; Jim Tom Petty
- Home stadium: Carroll Field

1933 Southwest Conference football standings
| | Conf. | | | | | Overall |
| Team | W | | L | | T | W | | L | | T |
|---|---|---|---|---|---|---|---|---|---|---|
| Arkansas | 4 | – | 1 | – | 0 | 7 | – | 3 | – | 1 |
| TCU | 4 | – | 2 | – | 0 | 9 | – | 2 | – | 1 |
| Baylor | 4 | – | 2 | – | 0 | 6 | – | 4 | – | 0 |
| Texas A&M | 2 | – | 2 | – | 1 | 6 | – | 3 | – | 1 |
| Texas | 2 | – | 3 | – | 1 | 4 | – | 5 | – | 2 |
| SMU | 2 | – | 4 | – | 0 | 4 | – | 7 | – | 1 |
| Rice | 1 | – | 5 | – | 0 | 3 | – | 8 | – | 0 |
Because of an ineligible played used by Arkansas, no championship was awarded.

The 1933 Baylor Bears football team represented Baylor University in the Southwest Conference (SWC) during the 1933 college football season. In their eighth season under head coach Morley Jennings, the Bears compiled a 6–4 record (4–2 against conference opponents), tied for second place in the conference, and outscored opponents by a combined total of 85 to 84. They played their home games at Carroll Field in Waco, Texas. Frank James and Jim Tom Petty were the team captains.

== Schedule ==
| Date | Opponent | Site | Result | Attendance | Source |
|---|---|---|---|---|---|
| September 30 | St. Edward's* | Carroll Field; Waco, TX | W 20–6 | | |
| October 7 | at Centenary* | Centenary College Stadium; Shreveport, LA | L 0–19 | 5,000 | |
| October 14 | at Arkansas | Quigley Stadium; Little Rock, AR | L 7–19 | | |
| October 21 | Simmons (TX)* | Carroll Field; Waco, TX | W 21–0 | | |
| October 28 | at Texas A&M | Kyle Field; College Station, TX (rivalry) | L 7–14 | 7,000 | |
| November 4 | TCU^{†} | Carroll Field; Waco, TX (rivalry) | W 7–0 | | |
| November 11 | at Texas | War Memorial Stadium; Austin, TX (rivalry) | W 3–0 | 11,000 | |
| November 17 | at Texas Tech* | Tech Field; Lubbock, TX (rivalry) | L 0–13 | 4,000 | |
| November 25 | at SMU | Ownby Stadium; University Park, TX | W 13–7 | | |
| December 2 | Rice | Carroll Field; Waco, TX | W 7–6 | | |
*Non-conference game; ^{†}Homecoming
