= Jack Chevigny =

American football player, coach, and administrator (1906–1945)

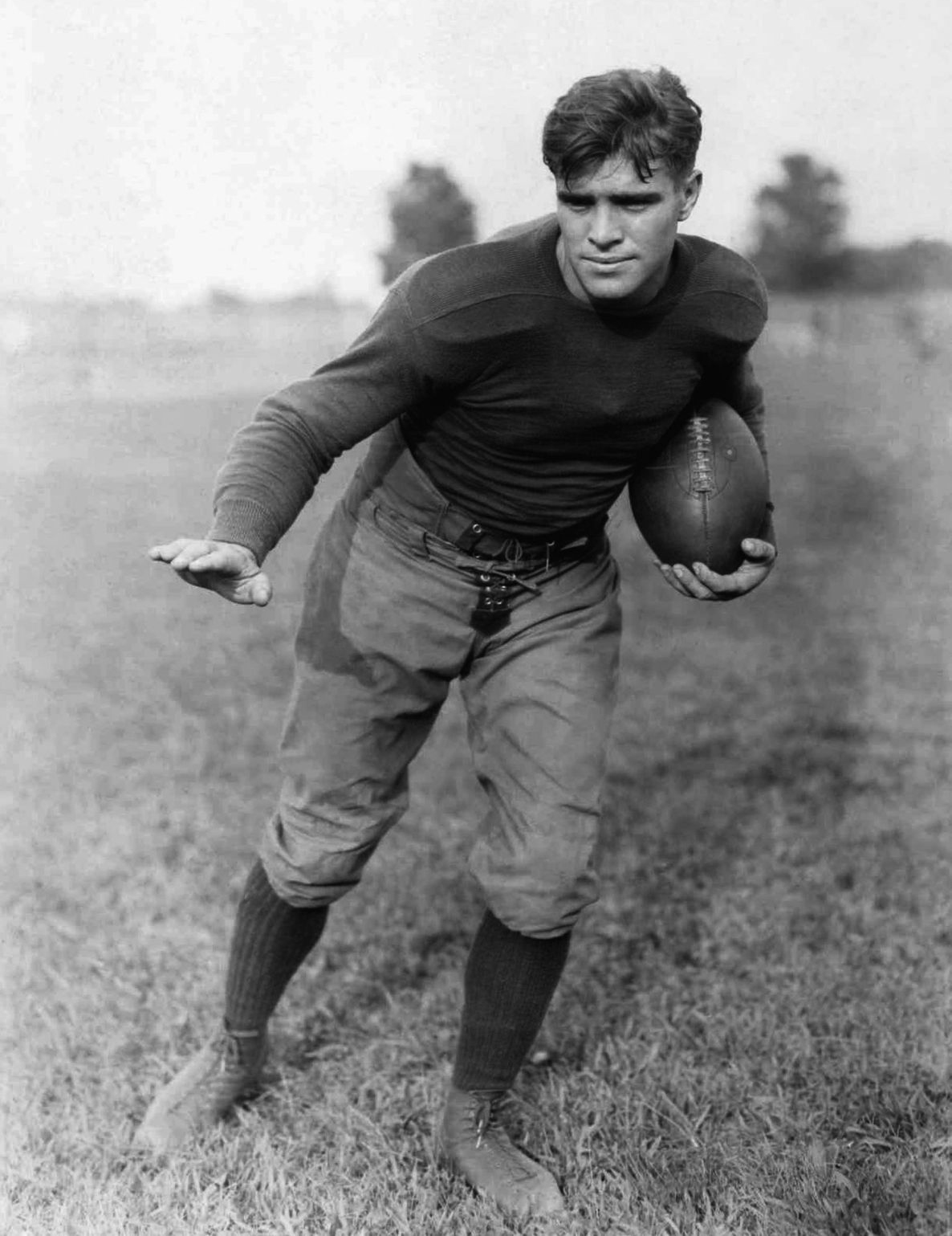

Biographical details
- Born: August 14, 1906; Dyer, Indiana, U.S.
- Died: February 19, 1945 (aged 38); Iwo Jima, Japan

Playing career
- 1926–1928: Notre Dame
- Position: Halfback

Coaching career (HC unless noted)
- 1929–1931: Notre Dame (assistant)
- 1932: Chicago Cardinals
- 1933: St. Edward's
- 1934–1936: Texas
- 1943: Camp Lejeune

Head coaching record
- Overall: 26–16–3 (college); 2–6–2 (NFL)

Accomplishments and honors

Championships
- 1 Texas Conference (1933)
- Military career
- Allegiance: United States
- Branch: United States Army; United States Marine Corps
- Service years: 1943–1945
- Rank: First Lieutenant
- Units: 27th Marine Regiment, 5th Marine Division, V Amphibious Corps
- Conflicts: World War II; Battle of Iwo Jima
- Awards: Purple Heart Medal; Combat Action Ribbon

John Edward Chevigny (August 14, 1906 – February 19, 1945) was an American football player, coach, lawyer, and United States Marine Corps officer who was killed in action on the first day of the Battle of Iwo Jima in World War II. He is best known for scoring the famous "that's one for Gipper" touchdown for Notre Dame on November 10, 1928, versus Army at Yankee Stadium. One of the Great Depression-era football stars, he was one of the best blocking backs for Knute Rockne's Notre Dame football team in the 1920s. Chevigny later served as the head coach of the Chicago Cardinals of the National Football League in 1932 and the head football coach at the University of Texas from 1934 to 1936.

On August 18, 1979, Chevigny was inducted posthumously into the Indiana Football Hall of Fame. He is also a member of the St. Edward's University Athletics Hall of Fame.

== Early life ==
Chevigny was born in Dyer, Indiana, the son of Julius Chevigny, a physician originally from the Canadian province of Quebec who had served in the U.S. Army, stationed in New York, during World War I, and Rose Ann Chevigny. He attended Catholic grade school in Dyer before moving to Hammond, Indiana, where he attended Hammond High School and played football at, and graduated president of his class in 1924. He had two brothers and two sisters.

=== University of Notre Dame ===
Part of the legend of Notre Dame football history was that Chevigny, who played three seasons as right halfback from 1926 to 1928, scored the winning touchdown against Army on November 10, 1928 (the 153rd birthday of the United States Marine Corps) in Yankee Stadium after Knute Rockne's famous "Win one for the Gipper" halftime speech (in memory of Notre Dame football great George Gipp) with Chevigny yelling, "That's one for the Gipper" as he crossed the goal line.

Knute Rockne had related the details about the famous game in an autobiography published in Collier's magazine in 1930. Actually, Chevigny scored the tying touchdown during the third quarter against undefeated Army (then 6–0), to even the score 6–6, and Johnny O'Brien, also inspired by Rockne's speech, ran for the 12–6 game-winning touchdown. However, it was because of that game and Chevigny's touchdown during that game, that the legend of "the Gipper" was born.

== Football coach and attorney ==
Chevigny became an assistant football coach under Rockne in 1929, and Notre Dame went undefeated that season and the next season winning two National Championships. Chevigny who received his Notre Dame law degree in 1931, left Notre Dame football after Rockne's death in an airplane crash March 31, 1931 and the 1931 football season.

He coached the Chicago Cardinals of the NFL to a 2–6–2 record in 1932, and left that position to become head coach at St. Edward's University, a sister school of Notre Dame, in Austin, Texas.

When the University of Texas began looking for a new coach in 1934, Chevigny was chosen for that position. He directed a 7–6 victory over his alma mater, Notre Dame, during the second game played in South Bend, Indiana. The Texas Longhorns finished the season at 7–2–1. The 1935 team didn't play as well and Chevigny finished his coaching career at the University of Texas with a 13–14–2 record in three seasons and was the only University of Texas head coach to have an overall losing record (a feat later matched by Charlie Strong).

In 1937, Chevigny resigned his Texas Longhorns coaching position and was appointed Deputy Attorney General of Texas. Following that, he worked in the oil industry in Texas.

== Military service ==
=== U.S. Army ===
In March 1943, Chevigny (then 36 years old) was drafted into the U.S. Army after trying to enlist and being rejected because of a football knee injury he received while playing at Notre Dame. He completed basic training at Fort Benjamin Harrison in Lawrence, Indiana. He was assigned afterwards to Fort Lawton in Seattle, Washington, a training and staging base. A corporal, he had requested and was granted service in the U.S. Marine Corps. He received an honorable discharge from the U.S. Army on June 10, 1943, in order to be released for service in the Marine Corps Reserve.

=== U.S. Marine Corps ===
Chevigny was directly commissioned a Marine Corps first lieutenant, going on active duty in the Marine Corps Reserve on June 11, 1943, in Seattle. The Marine Corps District Headquarters Induction and Recruitment Station in Seattle immediately used him in a public-relations enlistment poster photo wearing his summer officers service uniform. Afterwards, he was transferred to Officer Indoctrination and Physical Training schools at Camp Pendleton, California.

In September 1943, Chevigny was assigned to Camp Lejeune in Jacksonville, North Carolina, as a physical training instructor, athletic officer, and assistant coach of the Camp Lejeune football team. He soon became head coach, renaming the team (then 0–2–1) which was named the " Camp Lejeune All-Stars", to the "Camp Lejeune Leathernecks" (they finished 6–2–1). In late 1943, he requested an overseas combat assignment.

==== Iwo Jima and death ====
In January 1944, Chevigny reported for duty at Camp Pendleton, California. After brief duty as an instructor, he was assigned to Headquarters Company, Headquarters Battalion, 5th Marine Division, where he was sent to Camp Tarawa, Hawaii, to train for the assault of Iwo Jima (Operation Detachment) which would include two other Marine divisions of the V Amphibious Corps. He was reassigned for duty as a liaison officer of H&S Company, 27th Marine Regiment, 5th Marine Division. He went with his unit to Iwo Jima aboard the attack transport, USS Rutland. The 27th Marines landed on "Red Beach 1" and "Red Beach 2" on February 19, 1945 (D-Day). 1st Lt. Chevigny was one of the many hundreds of Marines and Navy corpsmen serving alongside them that were killed in action on the seven color-named and numbered landing zones, each 550 yards wide, that together stretched for two miles of beach on the southeast side of Iwo Jima.

Chevigny was buried in the 5th Marine Division Cemetery on Iwo Jima and later was reburied in the National Memorial Cemetery of the Pacific (called the "Punchbowl"; dedicated in 1949) in Honolulu, Hawaii. His tombstone is located in Section C, Site 508.

=== Japanese surrender ===
Another legend surrounding Chevigny is that he had been given a fountain pen with the inscription "To Jack Chevigny, a Notre Dame boy who beat Notre Dame" following the Chevigny-coached Texas Longhorns’ 7–6 upset of the Fighting Irish in 1934. On September 2, 1945, this pen was supposedly discovered in the hands of one of the Japanese officer envoys at the surrender of Japan on the battleship USS Missouri. The pen was sent back home, and the inscription was changed to read, "To Jack Chevigny, a Notre Dame boy who gave his life for his country in the spirit of old Notre Dame". The legend, which surfaced in 1945 in conjunction with the anniversary of the November 10, 1928 football game, has been a part of Notre Dame lore ever since. However, no one in the Chevigny family has seen or confirmed the existence of the pen, or that the inscription was changed.

== Head coaching record ==
=== College ===
| Year | Team | Overall | Conference | Standing | Bowl/playoffs |
|---|---|---|---|---|---|
St. Edward's Tigers (Texas Conference) (1933)
| 1933 | St. Edward's | 7–2 | 5–1 | 1st | |
| St. Edward's: | | 7–2 | 5–1 | | |
Texas Longhorns (Southwest Conference) (1934–1936)
| 1934 | Texas | 7–2–1 | 4–1–1 | 2nd | |
| 1935 | Texas | 4–6 | 1–5 | T–6th | |
| 1936 | Texas | 2–6–1 | 1–5 | T–6th | |
| Texas: | | 13–14–3 | 6–11–1 | | |
Camp Lejeune Marines (Independent) (1943)
| 1943 | Camp Lejeune | 6–0–1 (Note: Marvin Bell served as head coach of the Camp Lejeune Marines for the first two games of the 1943 season. Chevigny was appointed head coach on September 30. Camp Lejeune finished the season with a record of 6–2–1.) | | | |
| Camp Lejeune: | | 6–0–1 | | | |
| Total: | | 26–16–3 | | | |
National championship Conference title Conference division title or championship game berth

== Military awards ==
Chevigny's military decorations and awards:

| Purple Heart Medal | Combat Action Ribbon | Navy Presidential Unit Citation |
| American Campaign Medal | Asiatic-Pacific Campaign Medal with one 3/16" bronze star | World War II Victory Medal |
