= 1936 SMU Mustangs football team =

American college football season

1936 SMU Mustangs football
- Conference: Southwest Conference
- Record: 5–4–1 (2–3–1 SWC)
- Head coach: Matty Bell (2nd season)
- Captains: Paschal Scottino; Johnny Sprague
- Home stadium: Ownby Stadium, Cotton Bowl

1936 Southwest Conference football standings
	Conf.					Overall
Team	W		L		T	W		L		T
No. 18 Arkansas $	5	–	1	–	0	7	–	3	–	0
No. 16 TCU	4	–	1	–	1	9	–	2	–	2
Texas A&M	3	–	2	–	1	8	–	3	–	1
Baylor	3	–	2	–	1	6	–	3	–	1
SMU	2	–	3	–	1	5	–	4	–	1
Rice	1	–	5	–	0	5	–	7	–	0
Texas	1	–	5	–	0	2	–	6	–	1
$ – Conference champion; Rankings from AP Poll

The 1936 SMU Mustangs football team represented Southern Methodist University (SMU) as a member of the Southwest Conference (SWC) during the 1936 college football season. Led by second-year head coach Matty Bell, the Mustangs compiled an overall record of 5–4–1 with a mark of 2–3–1 in conference play, plaching fifth in the SWC. The team played home games at Ownby Stadium in Dallas.

Entering the season as defending co-national champion, SMU had high expectations once again. They lost their first regular season game in two years when were defeated by Fordham at the Polo Grounds. Nonetheless, SMU was ranked 19th in first ever AP Poll, released two weeks later, on October 19.

== Schedule ==
Date	Opponent	Rank	Site	Result	Attendance	Source
September 26	North Texas State Teachers*		Ownby Stadium; University Park, TX (rivalry)	W 6–0		
October 3	Texas A&I*		Ownby Stadium; University Park, TX	W 60–0	7,000	
October 10	at Fordham*		Polo Grounds; New York, NY	L 0–7	30,000	
October 17	Vanderbilt*		Cotton Bowl; Dallas, TX	W 16–0	20,000	
October 31	at Texas	No. 15	War Memorial Stadium; Austin, TX	W 14–7	16,000	
November 7	Texas A&M	No. 12	Ownby Stadium; University Park, TX	L 6–22	26,000	
November 14	Arkansas	No. 19	Ownby Stadium; University Park, TX	L 0–17		
November 21	at Baylor		Waco Stadium; Waco, TX	L 7–13		
November 28	No. 18 TCU		Ownby Stadium; University Park, TX (rivalry)	T 0–0		
December 5	at Rice		Rice Field; Houston, TX (rivalry)	W 9–0		
*Non-conference game; Rankings from AP Poll released prior to the game

== Rankings ==
Ranking movements Legend: ██ Increase in ranking ██ Decrease in ranking — = Not ranked т = Tied with team above or below
	Week						
Poll	1	2	3	4	5	6	Final
AP	19	15	12	19T	—	—	—
