= 1933 St. Edward's Tigers football team =

American college football season

1933 St. Edward's Tigers football

Texas Conference champion
- Conference: Texas Conference
- Record: 7–2 (5–1 Texas)
- Head coach: Jack Chevigny (1st season)
- Home stadium: House Park

1933 Texas Conference football standings
	Conf.					Overall
Team	W		L		T	W		L		T
St. Edward's $	5	–	1	–	0	7	–	2	–	0
Howard Payne	4	–	2	–	0	5	–	3	–	1
Abilene Christian *	2	–	1	–	2	5	–	3	–	2
McMurry	3	–	2	–	0	4	–	4	–	2
Austin	1	–	2	–	2	1	–	6	–	2
Simmons (TX)	1	–	2	–	1	4	–	5	–	1
Southwestern (TX)	1	–	4	–	1	1	–	8	–	2
Daniel Baker	0	–	4	–	2	0	–	7	–	2
$ – Conference champion; * – Abilene Christian's game against Texas A&I counted in conference standings even though Texas A&I was not a conference member.

The 1933 St. Edward's Tigers football team represented St. Edward's University as a member of the Texas Conference during 1933 college football season. Led by Jack Chevigny in his first and only season as head coach, the team went 3–6–1 overall, winning the Texas Conference title with a mark of 5–1.

== Schedule ==
Date	Time	Opponent	Site	Result	Attendance	Source
September 30		at Baylor*	Carroll Field; Waco, TX	L 6–20		
October 6	8:00 p.m.	Simmons (TX)	House Park; Austin, TX	W 13–0		
October 13		at Southwestern (TX)	Snyder Field; Georgetown, TX	W 18–0		
October 19		at Daniel Baker	Brownwood, TX	W 31–0		
October 27		Austin	Austin, TX	W 18–0		
November 4		at McMurry	Abilene, TX	L 6–7		
November 11		at Howard Payne	Brownwood, TX	W 7–0	5,000	
November 17		Schreiner*	Austin, TX	W 7–0	4,000	
November 25		vs. Texas Mines*	Eagle Field; San Antonio, TX	W 6–0	1,500	
*Non-conference game; All times are in Central time
