= 1934 Texas A&M Aggies football team =

American college football season

1934 Texas A&M Aggies football
- Conference: Southwest Conference
- Record: 2–7–2 (1–4–1 SWC)
- Head coach: Homer Norton (1st season)
- Home stadium: Kyle Field

1934 Southwest Conference football standings
	Conf.					Overall
Team	W		L		T	W		L		T
No. 5 Rice $	5	–	1	–	0	9	–	1	–	1
Texas	4	–	1	–	1	7	–	2	–	1
SMU	3	–	2	–	1	8	–	2	–	2
TCU	3	–	3	–	0	8	–	4	–	0
Arkansas	2	–	3	–	1	4	–	4	–	2
Texas A&M	1	–	4	–	1	2	–	7	–	2
Baylor	1	–	5	–	0	3	–	7	–	0
$ – Conference champion; Rankings from Dickinson System

The 1934 Texas A&M Aggies football team represented the Agricultural and Mechanical College of Texas—now known as Texas A&M University—in the Southwest Conference (SWC) during the 1934 college football season. In its first season under head coach Homer Norton, the team compiled an overall record of 2–7–2, with a mark of 1–4–1 in conference play, and finished sixth in the SWC.

== Schedule ==
Date	Opponent	Site	Result	Attendance	Source
September 22	Sam Houston State*	Kyle Field; College Station, TX	W 28–0	5,000	
September 29	Texas A&I*	Kyle Field; College Station, TX	T 14–14		
October 6	at Temple*	Temple Stadium; Philadelphia, PA	L 6–40	5,000	
October 13	vs. Centenary*	Purple Stadium; Beaumont, TX	L 0–13		
October 20	TCU	Kyle Field; College Station, TX (rivalry)	L 0–13		
October 27	at Baylor	Carroll Field; Waco, TX (rivalry)	W 10–7		
November 3	Arkansas	Kyle Field; College Station, TX (rivalry)	T 7–7		
November 10	at SMU	Ownby Stadium; University Park, TX	L 0–28	12,000	
November 17	Rice	Kyle Field; College Station, TX	L 6–25		
November 28	at Texas	War Memorial Stadium; Austin, TX (rivalry)	L 0–13	20,000	
December 8	vs. Michigan State*	Eagle Field; San Antonio, TX	L 13–26	8,000	
*Non-conference game
