= 1934 Arkansas Razorbacks football team =

American college football season

1934 Arkansas Razorbacks football
- Conference: Southwest Conference
- Record: 4–4–2 (2–3–1 SWC)
- Head coach: Fred Thomsen (6th season)
- Captain: W. R. Benton
- Home stadium: The Hill, Quigley Stadium

1934 Southwest Conference football standings
	Conf.					Overall
Team	W		L		T	W		L		T
No. 5 Rice $	5	–	1	–	0	9	–	1	–	1
Texas	4	–	1	–	1	7	–	2	–	1
SMU	3	–	2	–	1	8	–	2	–	2
TCU	3	–	3	–	0	8	–	4	–	0
Arkansas	2	–	3	–	1	4	–	4	–	2
Texas A&M	1	–	4	–	1	2	–	7	–	2
Baylor	1	–	5	–	0	3	–	7	–	0
$ – Conference champion; Rankings from Dickinson System

The 1934 Arkansas Razorbacks football team represented the University of Arkansas in the Southwest Conference (SWC) during the 1934 college football season. In their sixth year under head coach Fred Thomsen, the Razorbacks compiled a 4–4–2 record (2–3–1 against SWC opponents), finished in fifth place in the SWC, and outscored their opponents by a combined total of 95 to 76.

== Schedule ==
Date	Opponent	Site	Result	Attendance	Source
September 29	Ozarks*	The Hill; Fayetteville, AR	W 13–0		
October 6	at TCU	Amon G. Carter Stadium; Fort Worth, TX	W 24–10	6,000	
October 13	Baylor	Quigley Stadium; Little Rock, AR	W 6–0		
October 20	vs. LSU*	State Fair Stadium; Shreveport, LA (rivalry)	L 0–16	12,000	
October 27	Missouri Mines*	The Hill; Fayetteville, AR	W 20–0		
November 3	at Texas A&M	Kyle Field; College Station, TX (rivalry)	T 7–7		
November 10	Rice^{†}	The Hill; Fayetteville, AR	L 0–7		
November 17	at SMU	Ownby Stadium; University Park, TX	L 6–10		
November 23	Texas	The Hill; Fayetteville, AR (rivalry)	L 12–19	4,000	
November 29	at Tulsa*	Skelly Field; Tulsa, OK	T 7–7	7,000	
*Non-conference game; ^{†}Homecoming
