= 1933 Texas Longhorns football team =

American college football season

1933 Texas Longhorns football
- Conference: Southwest Conference
- Record: 4–5–2 (2–3–1 SWC)
- Head coach: Clyde Littlefield (7th season)
- Captain: Bill Smith
- Home stadium: War Memorial Stadium

1933 Southwest Conference football standings
	Conf.					Overall
Team	W		L		T	W		L		T
Arkansas	4	–	1	–	0	7	–	3	–	1
TCU	4	–	2	–	0	9	–	2	–	1
Baylor	4	–	2	–	0	6	–	4	–	0
Texas A&M	2	–	2	–	1	6	–	3	–	1
Texas	2	–	3	–	1	4	–	5	–	2
SMU	2	–	4	–	0	4	–	7	–	1
Rice	1	–	5	–	0	3	–	8	–	0
Because of an ineligible played used by Arkansas, no championship was awarded.

The 1933 Texas Longhorns football team was an American football team that represented the University of Texas (now known as the University of Texas at Austin) as a member of the Southwest Conference (SWC) during the 1933 college football season. In their seventh year under head coach Clyde Littlefield, the Longhorns compiled an overall record of 4–5–2, with a mark of 2–3–1 in conference play, and finished fifth in the SWC.

== Schedule ==
Date	Opponent	Site	Result	Attendance	Source
September 23	at Southwestern (TX)*	Snyder Field; Georgetown, TX	W 46–0	2,000	
September 30	Texas Mines*	War Memorial Stadium; Austin, TX	W 22–6		
October 7	at Nebraska*	Memorial Stadium; Lincoln, NE	L 0–26	18,000	
October 14	vs. Oklahoma*	Fair Park Stadium; Dallas, TX (rivalry)	L 0–9	20,000	
October 21	vs. Centenary*	Eagle Field; San Antonio, TX	T 0–0	10,000	
October 28	Rice	War Memorial Stadium; Austin, TX (rivalry)	W 18–0		
November 4	at SMU	Ownby Stadium; University Park, TX	W 10–0		
November 11	Baylor	War Memorial Stadium; Austin, TX (rivalry)	L 0–3	11,000	
November 18	TCU	War Memorial Stadium; Austin, TX (rivalry)	L 0–30		
November 24	Arkansas	War Memorial Stadium; Austin, TX (rivalry)	L 6–20		
November 30	at Texas A&M	Kyle Field; College Station, TX (rivalry)	T 10–10	25,000	
*Non-conference game
