= 1933 TCU Horned Frogs football team =

American college football season

1933 TCU Horned Frogs football
- Conference: Southwest Conference
- Record: 9–2–1 (4–2 SWC)
- Head coach: Francis Schmidt (5th season)
- Home stadium: Amon G. Carter Stadium

1933 Southwest Conference football standings
	Conf.					Overall
Team	W		L		T	W		L		T
Arkansas	4	–	1	–	0	7	–	3	–	1
TCU	4	–	2	–	0	9	–	2	–	1
Baylor	4	–	2	–	0	6	–	4	–	0
Texas A&M	2	–	2	–	1	6	–	3	–	1
Texas	2	–	3	–	1	4	–	5	–	2
SMU	2	–	4	–	0	4	–	7	–	1
Rice	1	–	5	–	0	3	–	8	–	0
Because of an ineligible played used by Arkansas, no championship was awarded.

The 1933 TCU Horned Frogs football team represented Texas Christian University (TCU) in the 1933 college football season. The Horned Frogs finished the season 9–2–1 overall and 4–2 in the Southwest Conference. The team was coached by Francis Schmidt in his fifth and final year as head coach. The Frogs played their home games in Amon G. Carter Stadium, which is located on campus in Fort Worth, Texas.

== Schedule ==
Date	Opponent	Site	Result	Attendance	Source
September 15	at Austin*	Sherman, TX	W 33–0		
September 22	at Daniel Baker*	Brownwood, TX	W 28–6		
September 29	at North Texas State Teachers*	Eagle Field; Denton, TX	W 13–0		
October 7	at Arkansas	The Hill; Fayetteville, AR	L 0–13		
October 14	Simmons (TX)*	Amon G. Carter Stadium; Fort Worth, TX	W 20–0		
October 21	Texas A&M	Amon G. Carter Stadium; Fort Worth, TX (rivalry)	W 13–7		
October 28	at Centenary*	State Fair Stadium; Shreveport, LA	T 0–0	7,000	
November 4	at Baylor	Carroll Field; Waco, TX (rivalry)	L 0–7		
November 11	North Dakota*	Amon G. Carter Stadium; Fort Worth, TX	W 19–7		
November 18	at Texas	War Memorial Stadium; Austin, TX (rivalry)	W 30–0		
November 25	Rice	Amon G. Carter Stadium; Fort Worth, TX	W 26–3		
December 2	SMU	Amon G. Carter Stadium; Fort Worth, TX (rivalry)	W 26–9	10,000	
*Non-conference game
