= 1936 Arkansas Razorbacks football team =

American college football season

1936 Arkansas Razorbacks football

SWC champion
- Conference: Southwest Conference

Ranking
- AP: No. 18
- Record: 7–3 (5–1 SWC)
- Head coach: Fred Thomsen (8th season)
- Captain: Clifford Van Sickle
- Home stadium: The Hill, Quigley Stadium

1936 Southwest Conference football standings
	Conf.					Overall
Team	W		L		T	W		L		T
No. 18 Arkansas $	5	–	1	–	0	7	–	3	–	0
No. 16 TCU	4	–	1	–	1	9	–	2	–	2
Texas A&M	3	–	2	–	1	8	–	3	–	1
Baylor	3	–	2	–	1	6	–	3	–	1
SMU	2	–	3	–	1	5	–	4	–	1
Rice	1	–	5	–	0	5	–	7	–	0
Texas	1	–	5	–	0	2	–	6	–	1
$ – Conference champion; Rankings from AP Poll

The 1936 Arkansas Razorbacks football team represented the University of Arkansas in the Southwest Conference (SWC) during the 1936 college football season. In their eighth year under head coach Fred Thomsen, the Razorbacks compiled a 7–3 record (5–1 against SWC opponents), finished in first place in the SWC, and outscored their opponents by a combined total of 178 to 87. The Razorbacks were known as the "passing-est team in the nation" by throwing a then un-imaginable 29 times per game.

The season is notable for being the first season that Arkansas finished ranked in the AP poll. Also notable this season, Arkansas played their first game against an AP ranked opponent in No. 13 LSU.

== Schedule ==
Date	Opponent	Site	Result	Attendance	Source
September 26	Pittsburg Teachers*	The Hill; Fayetteville, AR	W 53–0		
October 3	at TCU	Amon G. Carter Stadium; Fort Worth, TX	L 14–18	12,000	
October 10	Baylor	The Hill; Fayetteville, AR	W 14–10		
October 16	at George Washington*	Griffith Stadium; Washington, DC	L 6–13	16,000	
October 24	vs. No. 13 LSU*	State Fair Stadium; Shreveport, LA (rivalry)	L 7–19	15,000	
October 31	at Texas A&M	Kyle Field; College Station, TX (rivalry)	W 18–0		
November 7	Rice^{†}	The Hill; Fayetteville, AR	W 20–14	5,000	
November 14	at No. 19 SMU	Ownby Stadium; University Park, TX	W 17–0		
November 26	at Tulsa*	Skelly Field; Tulsa, OK	W 23–13	16,000	
December 5	Texas	Quigley Stadium; Little Rock, AR (rivalry)	W 6–0	7,000	
*Non-conference game; ^{†}Homecoming; Rankings from AP Poll released prior to the game

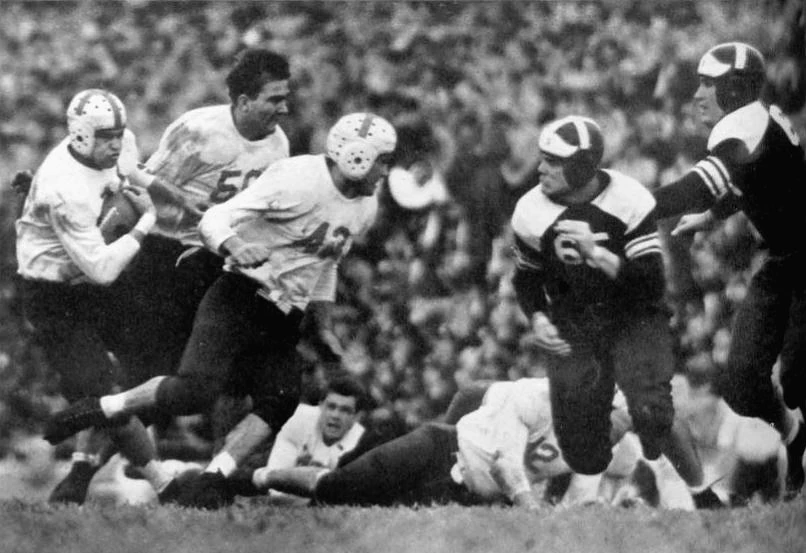
Arkansas thumped A&M to spark a mid-season turnaround
