= Wendel D. Ley Track and Holloway Field =

Sports stadium at Rice University, Houston, Texas

Coordinates: 29.712954°N 95.401907°W

- Interactive map of Wendel D. Ley Track and Holloway Field
- Location: 6100 South Main Street; Houston, Texas 77005
- Owner: Rice University
- Operator: Rice University
- Capacity: 1,500
- Surface: Grass

Construction
- Opened: 1950
- Renovated: 1966, 2011

Tenants
- Rice Owls Soccer (NCAA) (2001–present); Rice Owls Track & Field (NCAA) (1912-present)

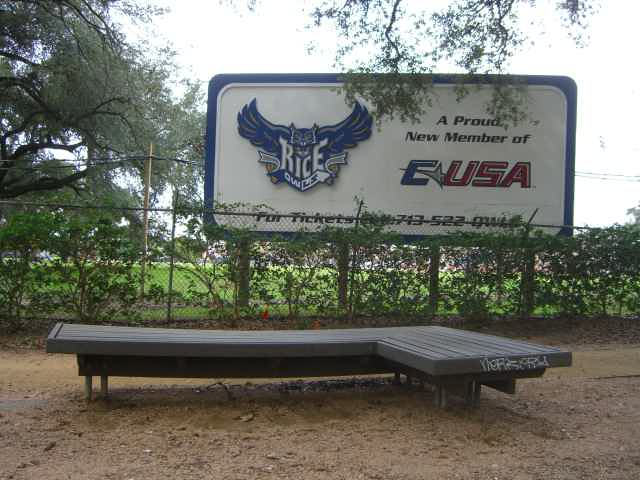
Rice Track/Soccer Stadium behind fence and sign.

Wendel D. Ley Track and Holloway Field is a stadium in Houston, Texas. It is primarily used for track and field and soccer for the Rice University Owls. It is bounded by Main Street (southeast), University Boulevard (southwest), Reckling Park baseball field (west) and open athletic fields (north).

The stadium sits on the location of Rice Field, Rice's old football stadium which opened in 1913 and was used until the opening of Rice Stadium in 1950. (Games in 1912 had been played at West End Park). The venue held less than 37,000 people for football. Today, it holds approximately 5,000 people. Part of the grandstand from the visitor's side of the old football stadium is used as the current grandstand, although the bleachers were removed. Today, there are about 100 permanent seats on the stone terracing.

The soccer field was installed in 2000-2001 after Rice added women's soccer as a varsity sport. In October 2002, the stadium hosted a WUSA exhibition match between the Washington Freedom (featuring Mia Hamm) and the Atlanta Beat. The event set the current stadium record with more than 5,000 tickets sold. The stadium hosted another WUSA exhibition in 2003 and has hosted two conference soccer tournaments: the Western Athletic Conference Tournament in 2002 and the Conference USA Tournament (won by Rice) in 2005. The WAC Outdoor Track & Field Championships were held there in 2002 and again in 2004. Following Rice's move to Conference USA in 2005, the C-USA Outdoor Track & Field Championships were hosted at the facility in 2007.

The stadium has also served as a practice venue for soccer teams visiting Houston, including the United States men's national team, Everton of the Premier League, the Colorado Rapids, the Republic of Ireland women's national football team, and the Argentina men's national football team.

The stadium has also hosted a series of summer all-comer track and field meets for more than 20 years, and notable athletes including Carl Lewis, Michael Johnson, Joanna Hayes and Bryan Bronson have competed.
