= List of UT Arlington Mavericks head football coaches =

The UT Arlington Mavericks football program was a college football team that represented the University of Texas at Arlington from the 1959 through 1985 seasons. Between 1919 through 1958, the team competed as a junior college.

The following is a list of UT Arlington Mavericks head football coaches. The first head coach of the program was L. William Caine, who began when the program was in its junior college phase. The final coach was Chuck Curtis.

== Key ==
Key to symbols in coaches list
General		Overall		Conference		Postseason (Note: Although the first Rose Bowl Game was played in 1902, it has been continuously played since the 1916 game, and is recognized as the oldest bowl game by the NCAA. "—" indicates any season prior to 1916 when postseason games were not played.)	
No.	Order of coaches (Note: A running total of the number of head coaches, with coaches who served separate tenures being counted only once. Interim head coaches are represented with "Int" and are not counted in the running total. "—" indicates the team played but either without a coach or no coach is on record. "X" indicates an interim year without play.)	GC	Games coached	CW	Conference wins	PW	Postseason wins
DC	Division championships	OW	Overall wins	CL	Conference losses	PL	Postseason losses
CC	Conference championships	OL	Overall losses	CT	Conference ties	PT	Postseason ties
NC	National championships	OT	Overall ties (Note: Overtime rules in college football were introduced in 1996, making ties impossible in the period since.)	C%	Conference winning percentage		
†	Elected to the College Football Hall of Fame	O%	Overall winning percentage (Note: When computing the win–loss percentage, a tie counts as half a win and half a loss.)				

== Coaches ==
No.	Name	Term	GC	OW	OL	OT	O%	CW	CL	CT	C%	PW	PL	CCs	NCs	Awards
1	L. William Caine	1919–1920	10	2	7	1	.250	—	—	—		0	0	0	0	
2	C. A. Duval	1921–1922	16	7	7	2	.500	—	—	—		0	0	0	0	
3	Charles M. Edens	1923–1924	18	9	7	2	.556	—	—	—		0	0	0	0	
4	John Calvin Moore	1925–1932	73	41	29	3	.582	—	—	—		0	0	0	0	
5	Eugene Lambert	1933–1934	21	12	4	5	.690	5	2	3	.650	1	0	0	0	
6	Klepto Holmes	1935–1950	149	77	67	5	.534	40	31	0	.563	0	0	3	0	
7	Al Milch	1951	9	4	4	1	.500	1	2	1	.375	0	0	0	0	
8	Willie Zapalac	1952	10	8	1	1	.850	3	0	1	.875	1	0	0	0	
9	Chena Gilstrap	1953–1965	128	85	40	3	.676	22	10	2	.676	2	0	3	1	1965 SLC CotY
10	Burley Bearden	1966–1970	51	27	24	0	.529	12	8	0	.600	1	0	2	0	1966 & 1967 SLC CotY
11	John Symank	1971–1973	32	11	21	0	.344	7	8	0	.467	0	0	0	0	
12	Harold Elliott	1974–1983	110	46	64	0	.418	25	26	0	.490	0	0	1	0	1981 SLC CotY
13	Chuck Curtis	1984–1985	22	11	10	1	.523	6	5	1	.542	0	0	0	0	
