= 1926 Sam Houston State Bearkats football team =

American college football season

1926 Sam Houston State Bearkats football
- Conference: Texas Intercollegiate Athletic Association
- Record: 5–3–1 (4–1 TIAA)
- Head coach: J. W. Jones (4th season)
- Home stadium: Pritchett Field

1926 Texas Intercollegiate Athletic Association football standings
	Conf.					Overall
Team	W		L		T	W		L		T
Daniel Baker $	4	–	0	–	0	7	–	2	–	1
North Texas State Teachers	4	–	1	–	0	5	–	3	–	1
Southwest Texas State	4	–	1	–	0	7	–	2	–	0
Sam Houston State	4	–	1	–	0	5	–	3	–	1
Abilene Christian	2	–	2	–	0	4	–	4	–	0
McMurry	1	–	2	–	0	1	–	9	–	0
Stephen F. Austin	1	–	3	–	0	5	–	5	–	0
St. Edward's	0	–	2	–	0	4	–	6	–	0
West Texas State	0	–	4	–	0	2	–	6	–	0
East Texas State	0	–	5	–	0	0	–	7	–	0
$ – Conference champion

The 1926 Sam Houston State Bearkats football team represented Sam Houston State Teachers College (now known as Sam Houston State University) as a member of the Texas Intercollegiate Athletic Association (TIAA) during the 1926 college football season. Led by fourth-year head coach J. W. Jones, the Bearkats compiled an overall record of 5–3–1 with a mark of 4–1 in conference play, tying for second place in the TIAA.

== Schedule ==
Date	Opponent	Site	Result	Source
September 24	Rusk College*	Pritchett Field; Huntsville, TX	W 7–0	
October 2	at Rice*	Rice Field; Houston, TX	L 0–20	
October 8	Abilene Christian	Pritchett Field; Huntsville, TX	W 26–7	
October 15	at Southwestern Louisiana*	Campus Athletic Field; Lafayette, LA	L 0–15	
October 23	McMurry	Pritchett Field; Huntsville, TX	W 19–6	
October 29	at East Texas State	Commerce, TX	W 9–8	
November 11	at Southwest Texas State	Evans Field; San Marcos, TX (rivalry)	L 0–9	
November 19	at Louisiana Tech*	Louisiana Tech Field; Ruston, LA	T 6–6	
November 26	Stephen F. Austin	Pritchett Field; Huntsville, TX (rivalry)	W 38–0	
*Non-conference game
