= 1927 Sam Houston State Bearkats football team =

American college football season

1927 Sam Houston State Bearkats football
- Conference: Texas Intercollegiate Athletic Association
- Record: 4–4–1 (3–1–1 TIAA)
- Head coach: J. W. Jones (5th season)
- Home stadium: Pritchett Field

1927 Texas Intercollegiate Athletic Association football standings
	Conf.					Overall
Team	W		L		T	W		L		T
McMurry $	3	–	0	–	2	4	–	1	–	2
Abilene Christian	4	–	1	–	0	6	–	1	–	1
Southwest Texas State	3	–	1	–	1	4	–	4	–	1
Sam Houston State	3	–	1	–	1	4	–	4	–	1
West Texas State	2	–	2	–	0	6	–	3	–	1
Daniel Baker	2	–	2	–	1	4	–	5	–	1
Stephen F. Austin	1	–	3	–	2	1	–	6	–	3
North Texas State Teachers	0	–	3	–	2	1	–	6	–	2
East Texas State	0	–	5	–	1	0	–	6	–	2
$ – Conference champion

The 1927 Sam Houston State Bearkats football team represented Sam Houston State Teachers College (now known as Sam Houston State University) as a member of the Texas Intercollegiate Athletic Association (TIAA) during the 1927 college football season. Led by fifth-year head coach J. W. Jones, the Bearkats compiled an overall record of 4–4–1 with a mark of 3–1–1 in conference play, tying for third place in the TIAA.

== Schedule ==
Date	Opponent	Site	Result	Source
September 24	at Centenary*	Centenary College Stadium; Shreveport, LA	L 0–27	
October 1	at Rice*	Rice Field; Houston, TX	L 13–20	
October 8	vs. Abilene Christian	Midwest Exhibition Grounds; Sweetwater, TX	L 0–12	
October 14	Southwestern Louisiana*	Pritchett Field; Huntsville, TX	W 25–0	
October 22	Daniel Baker	Pritchett Field; Huntsville, TX	W 14–0	
October 28	East Texas State	Pritchett Field; Huntsville, TX	W 78–0	
November 11	Southwest Texas State	Pritchett Field; Huntsville, TX (rivalry)	T 6–6	
November 19	at St. Mary's (TX)*	San Antonio, TX	L 0–6	
November 24	at Stephen F. Austin	Birdwell Field; Nacogdoches, TX (rivalry)	W 6–0	
*Non-conference game
