= 1931 Daniel Baker Hill Billies football team =

American college football season

1931 Daniel Baker Hill Billies football

TIAA Western Division champion

TIAA Championship Game, L 13–32 at North Texas State
- Conference: Texas Intercollegiate Athletic Association
- Western Division
- Record: 4–5 (3–2 TIAA)
- Head coach: R. E. Blair (3rd season)

1931 Texas Intercollegiate Athletic Association football standings
	Conf.					Overall
Team	W		L		T	W		L		T
Eastern Division
North Texas State Teachers x$	4	–	0	–	0	8	–	3	–	0
Texas A&I	4	–	0	–	0	8	–	1	–	0
Sam Houston State	3	–	2	–	0	4	–	5	–	0
Southwest Texas State	2	–	3	–	0	4	–	4	–	0
East Texas State	1	–	4	–	0	3	–	6	–	0
Stephen F. Austin	0	–	5	–	0	1	–	7	–	0
Western Division
Daniel Baker x	3	–	2	–	0	4	–	5	–	0
Abilene Christian	3	–	2	–	0	4	–	5	–	0
West Texas State	2	–	2	–	0	6	–	3	–	0
McMurry	2	–	2	–	0	2	–	6	–	0
Sul Ross	1	–	3	–	0	3	–	5	–	0
Championship: North Texas State Teachers 32, Daniel Baker 13
$ – Conference champion; x – Division champion/co-champions; y – Championship game participant

The 1931 Daniel Baker Hill Billies football team represented Daniel Baker College as a member of the Texas Intercollegiate Athletic Association (TIAA) during the 1931 college football season. Led by third–year head coach R. E. Blair, the Hill Billies compiled an overall record of 4–5 with a mark of 3–2 in conference play, winning the TIAA's Western Division title. Daniel Baker advanced to the TIAA Championship Game, where the Hill Billies lost to North Texas State.

== Schedule ==
Date	Opponent	Site	Result	Source
September 18	Simmons (TX)*	Brownwood, TX	L 0–6	
October 10	Howard Payne*	Brownwood, TX	W 19–0	
October 16	at West Texas State	Canyon, TX	W 40–19	
October 24	vs. Sul Ross	San Angelo, TX	L 0–12	
October 30	at John Tarleton*	Stephenville, TX	L 7–13	
November 11	at McMurry	Abilene, TX	L 6–7	
November 26	Abilene Christian	Brownwood TX	W 7–0	
December 5	at Abilene Christian	Abilene, TX	W 3–0	
December 9	at North Texas State*	Eagle Field; Denton, TX (TIAA Championship Game)	L 13–32	
*Non-conference game
