= 1929 North Texas State Teachers Eagles football team =

American college football season

1929 North Texas State Teachers Eagles football
- Conference: Texas Intercollegiate Athletic Association
- Record: 4–3–2 (2–0–2 TIAA)
- Head coach: Jack Sisco (1st season)
- Home stadium: Eagle Field

1929 Texas Intercollegiate Athletic Association football standings
	Conf.					Overall
Team	W		L		T	W		L		T
Southwest Texas State $	4	–	0	–	2	6	–	1	–	2
North Texas State Teachers	2	–	0	–	2	4	–	3	–	2
McMurry	3	–	1	–	1	4	–	1	–	3
Abilene Christian	2	–	1	–	1	6	–	1	–	1
Sam Houston State	2	–	1	–	1	6	–	3	–	1
West Texas State	2	–	2	–	0	6	–	3	–	1
Stephen F. Austin	1	–	3	–	1	1	–	7	–	2
Sul Ross	0	–	1	–	1	1	–	3	–	3
East Texas State	0	–	3	–	1	0	–	6	–	1
Daniel Baker	0	–	4	–	0	3	–	6	–	1
$ – Conference champion

The 1929 North Texas State Teachers Eagles football team was an American football team that represented the North Texas State Teachers College (now known as the University of North Texas) during the 1929 college football season as a member of the Texas Intercollegiate Athletic Association. In their first year under head coach Jack Sisco, the team compiled a 4–3–2 record.

== Schedule ==
Date	Opponent	Site	Result	Source
September 21	at SMU*	Ownby Stadium; University Park, TX (rivalry)	L 3–13	
September 28	at Baylor*	Carroll Field; Waco, TX	L 0–32	
October 4	Decatur Baptist*	Eagle Field; Denton, TX	W 98–0	
October 18	Stephen F. Austin	Eagle Field; Denton, TX	W 31–0	
October 26	at Trinity (TX)*	Yoakum Field; Waxahachie, TX	W 7–0	
November 2	at TCU*	Clark Field; Fort Worth, TX	L 0–25	
November 11	East Texas State	Eagle Field; Denton, TX	W 34–0	
November 18	Sam Houston State	Eagle Field; Denton, TX	T 6–6	
November 27	at Southwest Texas State	Evans Field; San Marcos, TX	T 0–0	
*Non-conference game
