= John B. Reid =

American football player and sports coach (1896–1963)

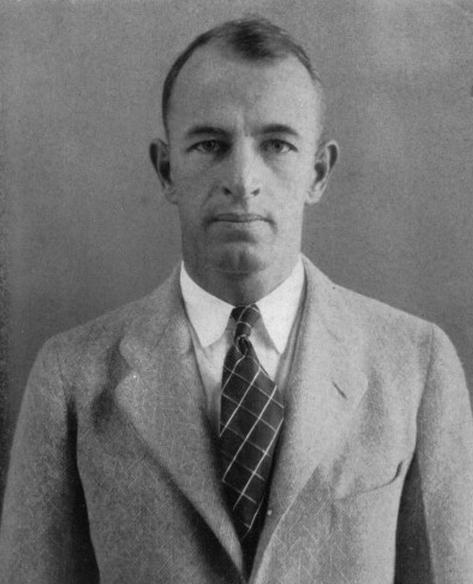
- Reid pictured in The Yucca 1928, North Texas State Teachers yearbook

Biographical details
- Born: February 25, 1896; Woodville, Texas, U.S.
- Died: December 21, 1963 (aged 67); Woodville, Texas, U.S.

Playing career

Football
- 1914–1915: Baylor
- 1917: Baylor

Coaching career (HC unless noted)

Football
- 1925–1928: North Texas State Teachers

Basketball
- 1924–1929: North Texas State Teachers
- 1929–1935: Texas A&M

Baseball
- 1925–1926: North Texas State Teachers

Head coaching record
- Overall: 16–18–3 (football); 144–84 (basketball); 7–11 (baseball)

John Bond Reid (February 25, 1896 – December 21, 1963) was an American football player and coach of football, basketball, and baseball. He served as head football coach at North Texas State Teachers College, now the University of North Texas, from 1925 to 1928, compiling a record of 16–18–3. Reid was also the head basketball coach at North Texas State Teachers from 1924 to 1929 and at Texas A&M University from 1929 to 1935, amassing a career college basketball record of 144–84. In addition, he was the head baseball coach at North Texas State Teachers College from 1925 to 1926, tallying a mark 7–11. He died of prostate cancer in 1963. He is interred at Magnolia Cemetery in Woodville.

== Head coaching record ==
=== Football ===
Year	Team	Overall	Conference	Standing	Bowl/playoffs
North Texas State Teachers Eagles (Texas Intercollegiate Athletic Association) (1925–1928)
1925	North Texas State Teachers	6–4	4–2	T–4th	
1926	North Texas State Teachers	5–3–1	4–1	T–2nd	
1927	North Texas State Teachers	1–6–2	0–3–2	T–9th	
1928	North Texas State Teachers	4–5	2–2	5th	
North Texas State Teachers:		16–18–3	10–8–2		
Total:		16–18–3			
