= 1931 Southwest Texas State Bobcats football team =

American college football season

1931 Southwest Texas State Bobcats football
- Conference: Texas Intercollegiate Athletic Association
- Record: 4–4 (2–3 TIAA)
- Head coach: Oscar W. Strahan (13th season)
- Home stadium: Evans Field

1931 Texas Intercollegiate Athletic Association football standings
	Conf.					Overall
Team	W		L		T	W		L		T
Eastern Division
North Texas State Teachers x$	4	–	0	–	0	8	–	3	–	0
Texas A&I	4	–	0	–	0	8	–	1	–	0
Sam Houston State	3	–	2	–	0	4	–	5	–	0
Southwest Texas State	2	–	3	–	0	4	–	4	–	0
East Texas State	1	–	4	–	0	3	–	6	–	0
Stephen F. Austin	0	–	5	–	0	1	–	7	–	0
Western Division
Daniel Baker x	3	–	2	–	0	4	–	5	–	0
Abilene Christian	3	–	2	–	0	4	–	5	–	0
West Texas State	2	–	2	–	0	6	–	3	–	0
McMurry	2	–	2	–	0	2	–	6	–	0
Sul Ross	1	–	3	–	0	3	–	5	–	0
Championship: North Texas State Teachers 32, Daniel Baker 13
$ – Conference champion; x – Division champion/co-champions; y – Championship game participant

The 1931 Southwest Texas State Bobcats football team was an American football team that represented Southwest Texas State Teachers College (now known as Texas State University) during the 1931 college football season as a member of the Texas Intercollegiate Athletic Association (TIAA). In their 13th year under head coach Oscar W. Strahan, the team compiled an overall record of 4–4 with a mark of 2–3 in conference play.

== Schedule ==
Date	Opponent	Site	Result	Source
October 2	at Howard Payne*	Brownwood, TX	L 0–6	
October 10	at Texas A&I	Kingsville, TX	L 0–7	
October 17	Stephen F. Austin	Evans Field; San Marcos, TX	W 19–0	
October 23	at Southwestern (TX)*	Snyder Field; Georgetown, TX	W 16–7	
October 30	Sam Houston State	Evans Field; San Marcos, TX (rivalry)	L 0–6	
November 6	McMurry*	Evans Field; San Marcos, TX	W 18–0	
November 18	at East Texas State	Commerce, TX	W 14–0	
November 25	North Texas State Teachers	Evans Field; San Marcos, TX	L 0–20	
*Non-conference game
