= 1926 Southwest Texas State Bobcats football team =

American college football season

1926 Southwest Texas State Bobcats football
- Conference: Texas Intercollegiate Athletic Association
- Record: 7–2 (4–1 TIAA)
- Head coach: Oscar W. Strahan (8th season)
- Home stadium: Evans Field

1926 Texas Intercollegiate Athletic Association football standings
	Conf.					Overall
Team	W		L		T	W		L		T
Daniel Baker $	4	–	0	–	0	7	–	2	–	1
North Texas State Teachers	4	–	1	–	0	5	–	3	–	1
Southwest Texas State	4	–	1	–	0	7	–	2	–	0
Sam Houston State	4	–	1	–	0	5	–	3	–	1
Abilene Christian	2	–	2	–	0	4	–	4	–	0
McMurry	1	–	2	–	0	1	–	9	–	0
Stephen F. Austin	1	–	3	–	0	5	–	5	–	0
St. Edward's	0	–	2	–	0	4	–	6	–	0
West Texas State	0	–	4	–	0	2	–	6	–	0
East Texas State	0	–	5	–	0	0	–	7	–	0
$ – Conference champion

The 1926 Southwest Texas State Bobcats football team was an American football team that represented Southwest Texas State Teachers College (now known as Texas State University) during the 1926 college football season as a member of the Texas Intercollegiate Athletic Association (TIAA). In their eighth year under head coach Oscar W. Strahan, the team compiled an overall record of 7–2 with a mark of 4–1 in conference play.

== Schedule ==
Date	Opponent	Site	Result	Source
September 25	South Texas State*	Evans Field; San Marcos, TX	W 13–2	
October 2	Stephen F. Austin	Evans Field; San Marcos, TX	W 7–0	
October 8	Howard Payne*	Evans Field; San Marcos, TX	L 25–28	
October 15	East Texas State	Evans Field; San Marcos, TX	W 34–0	
October 22	Trinity (TX)*	Evans Field; San Marcos, TX	W 28–7	
October 30	at St. Mary's (TX)	San Antonio, TX	W 36–0	
November 5	at St. Edward's*	Memorial Stadium; Austin, TX	W 7–6	
November 11	Sam Houston State	Evans Field; San Marcos, TX (rivalry)	W 9–0	
November 18	at North Texas State Teachers	Eagle Field; Denton, TX	L 12–13	
*Non-conference game
