= 1930 North Texas State Teachers Eagles football team =

American college football season

1930 North Texas State Teachers Eagles football
- Conference: Texas Intercollegiate Athletic Association
- Record: 5–4–1 (4–1 TIAA)
- Head coach: Jack Sisco (2nd season)
- Home stadium: Eagle Field

1930 Texas Intercollegiate Athletic Association football standings
	Conf.					Overall
Team	W		L		T	W		L		T
Sam Houston State $	5	–	0	–	0	9	–	1	–	0
West Texas State	4	–	0	–	1	6	–	3	–	1
North Texas State Teachers	4	–	1	–	0	5	–	4	–	1
Southwest Texas State	3	–	1	–	2	5	–	2	–	3
McMurry	3	–	2	–	1	3	–	4	–	2
Daniel Baker	2	–	2	–	2	2	–	7	–	2
Texas A&I	1	–	2	–	1	3	–	3	–	3
Abilene Christian	1	–	3	–	1	2	–	7	–	1
East Texas State	1	–	4	–	0	2	–	7	–	0
Sul Ross	0	–	3	–	0	1	–	7	–	0
Stephen F. Austin	0	–	6	–	0	1	–	7	–	1
$ – Conference champion

The 1930 North Texas State Teachers Eagles football team was an American football team that represented the North Texas State Teachers College (now known as the University of North Texas) during the 1930 college football season as a member of the Texas Intercollegiate Athletic Association. In their second year under head coach Jack Sisco, the team compiled a 5–4–1 record.

== Schedule ==
Date	Opponent	Site	Result	Source
September 19	TCU*	Eagle Field; Denton, TX	L 0–47	
September 27	at Baylor*	Cotton Palace; Waco, TX	L 0–33	
October 3	Austin*	Eagle Field; Denton, TX	L 0–6	
October 10	at Southwestern (TX)*	Georgetown, TX	T 13–13	
October 17	Trinity (TX)*	Eagle Field; Denton, TX	W 9–6	
October 24	at Abilene Christian	Abilene, TX	W 20–12	
November 1	at Stephen F. Austin	Birdwell Field; Nacogdoches, TX	W 13–6	
November 11	at East Texas State	Lion Stadium; Commerce, TX	W 19–0	
November 17	at Sam Houston State	Pritchett Field; Huntsville, TX	L 0–13	
November 24	Southwest Texas State	Eagle Field; Denton, TX	W 13–0	
*Non-conference game
