= 1927 Southwest Texas State Bobcats football team =

American college football season

1927 Southwest Texas State Bobcats football
- Conference: Texas Intercollegiate Athletic Association
- Record: 4–4–1 (3–1–1 TIAA)
- Head coach: Oscar W. Strahan (9th season)
- Home stadium: Evans Field

1927 Texas Intercollegiate Athletic Association football standings
	Conf.					Overall
Team	W		L		T	W		L		T
McMurry $	3	–	0	–	2	4	–	1	–	2
Abilene Christian	4	–	1	–	0	6	–	1	–	1
Southwest Texas State	3	–	1	–	1	4	–	4	–	1
Sam Houston State	3	–	1	–	1	4	–	4	–	1
West Texas State	2	–	2	–	0	6	–	3	–	1
Daniel Baker	2	–	2	–	1	4	–	5	–	1
Stephen F. Austin	1	–	3	–	2	1	–	6	–	3
North Texas State Teachers	0	–	3	–	2	1	–	6	–	2
East Texas State	0	–	5	–	1	0	–	6	–	2
$ – Conference champion

The 1927 Southwest Texas State Bobcats football team was an American football team that represented Southwest Texas State Teachers College (now known as Texas State University) during the 1927 college football season as a member of the Texas Intercollegiate Athletic Association (TIAA). In their ninth year under head coach Oscar W. Strahan, the team compiled an overall record of 4–4–1 with a mark of 3–1–1 in conference play.

== Schedule ==
Date	Opponent	Site	Result	Source
October 1	at Stephen F. Austin	Nacogdoches, TX	W 14–0	
October 7	at Howard Payne*	Brownwood, TX	L 0–20	
October 14	Daniel Baker	Evans Field; San Marcos, TX	L 0–13	
October 21	at Trinity (TX)*	Yoakum Field; Waxahachie, TX	L 0–20	
October 29	North Texas State Teachers	Evans Field; San Marcos, TX	W 38–0	
November 5	at St. Mary's (TX)*	San Antonio, TX	W 22–0	
November 11	at Sam Houston State	Pritchett Field; Huntsville, TX (rivalry)	T 6–6	
November 18	East Texas State	Evans Field; San Marcos, TX	W 40–0	
November 24	St. Edward's*	Evans Field; San Marcos, TX	L 7–12	
*Non-conference game
