= 1931 Sam Houston State Bearkats football team =

American college football season

1931 Sam Houston State Bearkats football
- Conference: Texas Intercollegiate Athletic Association
- Eastern Division
- Record: 3–6 (2–3 TIAA)
- Head coach: J. W. Jones (9th season)
- Home stadium: Pritchett Field

1931 Texas Intercollegiate Athletic Association football standings
| | Conf. | | | | | Overall |
| Team | W | | L | | T | W | | L | | T |
|---|---|---|---|---|---|---|---|---|---|---|
Eastern Division
| North Texas State Teachers x$ | 4 | – | 0 | – | 0 | 8 | – | 3 | – | 0 |
| Texas A&I | 4 | – | 0 | – | 0 | 8 | – | 1 | – | 0 |
| Sam Houston State | 3 | – | 2 | – | 0 | 4 | – | 5 | – | 0 |
| Southwest Texas State | 2 | – | 3 | – | 0 | 4 | – | 4 | – | 0 |
| East Texas State | 1 | – | 4 | – | 0 | 3 | – | 6 | – | 0 |
| Stephen F. Austin | 0 | – | 5 | – | 0 | 1 | – | 7 | – | 0 |
Western Division
| Daniel Baker x | 3 | – | 2 | – | 0 | 4 | – | 5 | – | 0 |
| Abilene Christian | 3 | – | 2 | – | 0 | 4 | – | 5 | – | 0 |
| West Texas State | 2 | – | 2 | – | 0 | 6 | – | 3 | – | 0 |
| McMurry | 2 | – | 2 | – | 0 | 2 | – | 6 | – | 0 |
| Sul Ross | 1 | – | 3 | – | 0 | 3 | – | 5 | – | 0 |
Championship: North Texas State Teachers 32, Daniel Baker 13
$ – Conference champion; x – Division champion/co-champions; y – Championship game participant

The 1931 Sam Houston State Bearkats football team represented Sam Houston State Teachers College (now known as Sam Houston State University) as a member of the Eastern Division of the Texas Intercollegiate Athletic Association (TIAA) during the 1931 college football season. Led by ninth-year head coach J. W. Jones, the Bearkats compiled an overall record of 3–6 with a mark of 2–3 in conference play, placing third in the TIAA's Eastern Division.

== Schedule ==
| Date | Opponent | Site | Result | Source |
|---|---|---|---|---|
| September 26 | at Rice* | Rice Field; Houston, TX | L 0–32 | |
| October 3 | at Southwestern (TX)* | Snyder Field; Georgetown, TX | L 0–20 | |
| October 9 | Trinity (TX)* | Pritchett Field; Huntsville, TX | W 13–0 | |
| October 16 | Schreiner* | Pritchett Field; Huntsville, TX | L 6–7 | |
| October 24 | East Texas State | Pritchett Field; Huntsville, TX | W 6–0 | |
| October 30 | at Southwest Texas State | Evans Field; San Marcos, TX (rivalry) | W 6–0 | |
| November 6 | Texas A&I | Pritchett Field; Huntsville, TX | L 0–33 | |
| November 16 | at North Texas State | Eagle Field; Denton, TX | L 0–19 | |
| November 23 | at Stephen F. Austin | Birdwell Field; Nacogdoches, TX (rivalry) | L 0–3 | |
*Non-conference game
