= 1926 North Texas State Teachers Eagles football team =

American college football season

1926 North Texas State Teachers Eagles football
- Conference: Texas Intercollegiate Athletic Association
- Record: 5–3–1 (4–1 TIAA)
- Head coach: John B. Reid (2nd season)
- Home stadium: Eagle Field

1926 Texas Intercollegiate Athletic Association football standings
	Conf.					Overall
Team	W		L		T	W		L		T
Daniel Baker $	4	–	0	–	0	7	–	2	–	1
North Texas State Teachers	4	–	1	–	0	5	–	3	–	1
Southwest Texas State	4	–	1	–	0	7	–	2	–	0
Sam Houston State	4	–	1	–	0	5	–	3	–	1
Abilene Christian	2	–	2	–	0	4	–	4	–	0
McMurry	1	–	2	–	0	1	–	9	–	0
Stephen F. Austin	1	–	3	–	0	5	–	5	–	0
St. Edward's	0	–	2	–	0	4	–	6	–	0
West Texas State	0	–	4	–	0	2	–	6	–	0
East Texas State	0	–	5	–	0	0	–	7	–	0
$ – Conference champion

The 1926 North Texas State Teachers Eagles football team was an American football team that represented the North Texas State Teachers College (now known as the University of North Texas) during the 1926 college football season as a member of the Texas Intercollegiate Athletic Association. In their second year under head coach John B. Reid, the team compiled a 5–3–1 record.

== Schedule ==
Date	Opponent	Site	Result	Source
September 24	at SMU*	Ownby Stadium; University Park, TX (rivalry)	L 0–42	
October 1	Decatur Baptist*	Eagle Field; Denton, TX	W 15–0	
October 16	at Stephen F. Austin	Birdwell Field; Nacogdoches, TX	W 9–6	
October 23	at Abilene Christian	Wildcat Field; Abilene, TX	L 10–13	
October 30	West Texas State	Eagle Field; Denton, TX	W 16–3	
November 5	Simmons (TX)*	Eagle Field; Denton, TX	T 7–7	
November 11	at East Texas State	Lion Stadium; Commerce, TX	W 21–7	
November 18	Southwest Texas State	Eagle Field; Denton, TX	W 13–12	
November 25	Trinity (TX)*	Eagle Field; Denton, TX	L 7–14	
*Non-conference game
