= 1930 Southwest Texas State Bobcats football team =

American college football season

1930 Southwest Texas State Bobcats football
- Conference: Texas Intercollegiate Athletic Association
- Record: 5–2–3 (3–1–2 TIAA)
- Head coach: Oscar W. Strahan (12th season)
- Home stadium: Evans Field

1930 Texas Intercollegiate Athletic Association football standings
	Conf.					Overall
Team	W		L		T	W		L		T
Sam Houston State $	5	–	0	–	0	9	–	1	–	0
West Texas State	4	–	0	–	1	6	–	3	–	1
North Texas State Teachers	4	–	1	–	0	5	–	4	–	1
Southwest Texas State	3	–	1	–	2	5	–	2	–	3
McMurry	3	–	2	–	1	3	–	4	–	2
Daniel Baker	2	–	2	–	2	2	–	7	–	2
Texas A&I	1	–	2	–	1	3	–	3	–	3
Abilene Christian	1	–	3	–	1	2	–	7	–	1
East Texas State	1	–	4	–	0	2	–	7	–	0
Sul Ross	0	–	3	–	0	1	–	7	–	0
Stephen F. Austin	0	–	6	–	0	1	–	7	–	1
$ – Conference champion

The 1930 Southwest Texas State Bobcats football team was an American football team that represented Southwest Texas State Teachers College (now known as Texas State University) during the 1930 college football season as a member of the Texas Intercollegiate Athletic Association (TIAA). In their 12th year under head coach Oscar W. Strahan, the team compiled an overall record of 5–2–3 with a mark of 3–1–2 in conference play.

== Schedule ==
Date	Opponent	Site	Result	Attendance	Source
September 20	at Texas*	War Memorial Stadium; Austin, TX	L 0–36	2,000	
September 27	at Stephen F. Austin	Nacogdoches, TX	W 6–0		
October 4	Howard Payne*	Evans Field; San Marcos, TX	T 0–0		
October 11	Schreiner*	Evans Field; San Marcos, TX	W 7–0		
October 18	at Abilene Christian	Abilene, TX	T 6–6		
October 25	Southwestern (TX)*	Evans Field; San Marcos, TX	W 13–0		
October 31	McMurry	Evans Field; San Marcos, TX	T 0–0		
November 11	vs. Sul Ross	Uvalde, TX	W 13–0		
November 17	at Daniel Baker	Brownwood, TX	W 6–0		
November 24	at North Texas State Teachers	Eagle Field; Denton, TX	L 0–13		
*Non-conference game
