= 1929 Sam Houston State Bearkats football team =

American college football season

1929 Sam Houston State Bearkats football
- Conference: Texas Intercollegiate Athletic Association
- Record: 5–3–1 (2–1–1 TIAA)
- Head coach: J. W. Jones (7th season)
- Home stadium: Pritchett Field

1929 Texas Intercollegiate Athletic Association football standings
	Conf.					Overall
Team	W		L		T	W		L		T
Southwest Texas State $	4	–	0	–	2	6	–	1	–	2
North Texas State Teachers	2	–	0	–	2	4	–	3	–	2
McMurry	3	–	1	–	1	4	–	1	–	3
Abilene Christian	2	–	1	–	1	6	–	1	–	1
Sam Houston State	2	–	1	–	1	6	–	3	–	1
West Texas State	2	–	2	–	0	6	–	3	–	1
Stephen F. Austin	1	–	3	–	1	1	–	7	–	2
Sul Ross	0	–	1	–	1	1	–	3	–	3
East Texas State	0	–	3	–	1	0	–	6	–	1
Daniel Baker	0	–	4	–	0	3	–	6	–	1
$ – Conference champion

The 1929 Sam Houston State Bearkats football team represented Sam Houston State Teachers College (now known as Sam Houston State University) as a member of the Texas Intercollegiate Athletic Association (TIAA) during the 1929 college football season. Led by seventh-year head coach J. W. Jones, the Bearkats compiled an overall record of 5–3–1 with a mark of 2–1–1 in conference play, tying for fourth place in the TIAA.

== Schedule ==
Date	Opponent	Site	Result	Source
September 27	Lon Morris*	Pritchett Field; Huntsville, TX	W 19–2	
October 5	at Rice*	Rice Field; Houston, TX	L 2–7	
October 11	Louisiana Normal*	Pritchett Field; Huntsville, TX	W 26–6	
October 19	at Centenary*	Fairgrounds Stadium; Shreveport, LA	L 0–35	
October 26	at Abilene Christian	Abilene Field; Abilene, TX	W 13–12	
November 1	East Texas State	Pritchett Field; Huntsville, TX	W 18–0	
November 11	South Texas State*	Pritchett Field; Huntsville, TX	W 19–0	
November 18	at North Texas State	Eagle Field; Denton, TX	T 6–6	
November 28	at Stephen F. Austin	Birdwell Field; Nacogdoches, TX (rivalry)	L 12–14	
*Non-conference game
