= 1927 North Texas State Teachers Eagles football team =

American college football season

1927 North Texas State Teachers Eagles football
- Conference: Texas Intercollegiate Athletic Association
- Record: 1–6–2 (0–3–2 TIAA)
- Head coach: John B. Reid (3rd season)
- Home stadium: Eagle Field

1927 Texas Intercollegiate Athletic Association football standings
	Conf.					Overall
Team	W		L		T	W		L		T
McMurry $	3	–	0	–	2	4	–	1	–	2
Abilene Christian	4	–	1	–	0	6	–	1	–	1
Southwest Texas State	3	–	1	–	1	4	–	4	–	1
Sam Houston State	3	–	1	–	1	4	–	4	–	1
West Texas State	2	–	2	–	0	6	–	3	–	1
Daniel Baker	2	–	2	–	1	4	–	5	–	1
Stephen F. Austin	1	–	3	–	2	1	–	6	–	3
North Texas State Teachers	0	–	3	–	2	1	–	6	–	2
East Texas State	0	–	5	–	1	0	–	6	–	2
$ – Conference champion

The 1927 North Texas State Teachers Eagles football team was an American football team that represented the North Texas State Teachers College (now known as the University of North Texas) during the 1927 college football season as a member of the Texas Intercollegiate Athletic Association. In their third year under head coach John B. Reid, the team compiled a 1–6–2 record.

== Schedule ==
Date	Opponent	Site	Result	Source
September 24	at SMU*	Ownby Stadium; University Park, TX (rivalry)	L 0–68	
October 1	at Simmons*	West Texas Fairgrounds; Abilene, TX	L 0–14	
October 7	Decatur Baptist*	Eagle Field; Denton, TX	W 12–0	
October 14	Stephen F. Austin	Eagle Field; Denton, TX	T 12–12	
October 21	Abilene Christian	Eagle Field; Denton, TX	L 0–33	
October 29	at Southwest Texas State	Evans Field; San Marcos, TX	L 0–38	
November 4	at McMurry	Fair Park Field; Abilene, TX	L 0–15	
November 11	East Texas State	Eagle Field; Denton, TX	T 7–7	
November 24	at Trinity (TX)*	Yoakum Field; Waxahachie, TX	L 0–37	
*Non-conference game
