= 1931 TCU Horned Frogs football team =

American college football season

1931 TCU Horned Frogs football
- Conference: Southwest Conference
- Record: 8–2–1 (4–1–1 SWC)
- Head coach: Francis Schmidt (3rd season)
- Home stadium: Amon G. Carter Stadium

1931 Southwest Conference football standings
	Conf.					Overall
Team	W		L		T	W		L		T
SMU $	5	–	0	–	1	9	–	1	–	1
TCU	4	–	1	–	1	8	–	2	–	1
Texas A&M	3	–	2	–	0	7	–	3	–	0
Rice	3	–	3	–	0	6	–	4	–	0
Texas	2	–	3	–	0	6	–	4	–	0
Baylor	1	–	5	–	0	3	–	6	–	0
Arkansas	0	–	4	–	0	3	–	5	–	1
$ – Conference champion

The 1931 TCU Horned Frogs football team represented Texas Christian University (TCU) in the 1931 college football season. The Horned Frogs finished the season 8–2–1 overall and 4–1–1 in the Southwest Conference. The team was coached by Francis Schmidt in his third year as head coach. The Frogs played their home games in Amon G. Carter Stadium, which is located on campus in Fort Worth, Texas.

== Schedule ==
Date	Opponent	Site	Result	Attendance	Source
September 19	North Texas State Teachers*	Amon G. Carter Stadium; Fort Worth, TX	W 33–6		
September 26	LSU*	Amon G. Carter Stadium; Fort Worth, TX	W 3–0		
October 3	at Tulsa*	Skelly Field; Tulsa, OK	L 0–13		
October 10	Austin*	Amon G. Carter Stadium; Fort Worth, TX	W 38–0		
October 17	Texas A&M	Amon G. Carter Stadium; Fort Worth, TX (rivalry)	W 6–0		
October 23	at Simmons (TX)*	Abilene, TX	W 6–0		
October 31	at Arkansas	The Hill; Fayetteville, AR	W 7–0	4,000	
November 7	Rice	Amon G. Carter Stadium; Fort Worth, TX	W 7–6		
November 14	at Texas	War Memorial Stadium; Austin, TX (rivalry)	L 0–10		
November 21	at Baylor	Carroll Field; Waco, TX (rivalry)	W 19–6		
November 28	SMU	Amon G. Carter Stadium; Fort Worth, TX (rivalry)	T 0–0	15,000	
*Non-conference game
