= 1935 Sam Houston State Bearkats football team =

American college football season

1935 Sam Houston State Bearkats football
- Conference: Lone Star Conference
- Record: 3–6 (0–4 LSC)
- Head coach: J. W. Jones (13th season)
- Home stadium: Pritchett Field

1935 Lone Star Conference football standings
	Conf.					Overall
Team	W		L		T	W		L		T
East Texas State +	3	–	1	–	0	6	–	2	–	1
North Texas State +	3	–	1	–	0	5	–	3	–	1
Stephen F. Austin +	3	–	1	–	0	4	–	5	–	0
Southwest Texas State	1	–	3	–	0	2	–	7	–	0
Sam Houston State	0	–	4	–	0	3	–	6	–	0
+ – Conference co-champions

The 1935 Sam Houston State Bearkats football team represented Sam Houston State Teachers College (now known as Sam Houston State University) as a member of the Lone Star Conference (LSC) during the 1935 college football season. Led by 13th-year head coach J. W. Jones, the Bearkats compiled an overall record of 3–6 with a mark of 0–4 in conference play, and finished fifth in the LSC.

== Schedule ==
Date	Opponent	Site	Result	Attendance	Source
September 20	Abilene Christian*	Pritchett Field; Huntsville, TX	W 32–0		
September 27	Texas A&M*	Pritchett Field; Huntsville, TX	L 0–25	4,000	
October 4	East Central*	Pritchett Field; Huntsville, TX	W 14–13		
October 19	East Texas State	Pritchett Field; Huntsville, TX	L 26–0		
October 26	at Lamar*	Greenie Stadium; Beaumont, TX	L 0–16		
November 1	at North Texas State	Eagle Field; Denton, TX	L 0–20		
November 8	at Southwest Texas State	Evans Field; San Marcos, TX (rivalry)	L 0–19		
November 15	Southwestern Louisiana*	Pritchett Field; Huntsville, TX	W 7–0		
November 23	at Stephen F. Austin	Birdwell Field; Nacogdoches, TX (rivalry)	L 0–33		
*Non-conference game
