= 1935 Southwest Texas State Bobcats football team =

American college football season

1935 Southwest Texas State Bobcats football
- Conference: Lone Star Conference
- Record: 2–7 (1–3 LSC)
- Head coach: Joe Bailey Cheaney (1st season)
- Home stadium: Evans Field

1935 Lone Star Conference football standings
| | Conf. | | | | | Overall |
| Team | W | | L | | T | W | | L | | T |
|---|---|---|---|---|---|---|---|---|---|---|
| East Texas State + | 3 | – | 1 | – | 0 | 6 | – | 2 | – | 1 |
| North Texas State + | 3 | – | 1 | – | 0 | 5 | – | 3 | – | 1 |
| Stephen F. Austin + | 3 | – | 1 | – | 0 | 4 | – | 5 | – | 0 |
| Southwest Texas State | 1 | – | 3 | – | 0 | 2 | – | 7 | – | 0 |
| Sam Houston State | 0 | – | 4 | – | 0 | 3 | – | 6 | – | 0 |
+ – Conference co-champions

The 1935 Southwest Texas State Bobcats football team was an American football team that represented Southwest Texas State Teachers College (now known as Texas State University) during the 1935 college football season as a member of the Lone Star Conference (LSC). In their first year under head coach Joe Bailey Cheaney, the team compiled an overall record of 2–7 with a mark of 1–3 in conference play.

== Schedule ==
| Date | Opponent | Site | Result | Source |
|---|---|---|---|---|
| September 27 | at Howard Payne* | Brownwood, TX | L 6–13 | |
| October 4 | at Schreiner* | Kerrville, TX | L 2–27 | |
| October 11 | Stephen F. Austin | Evans Field; San Marcos, TX | L 0–14 | |
| October 18 | at Southwestern (TX)* | Snyder Field; Georgetown, TX | W 12–0 | |
| October 25 | Daniel Baker* | Evans Field; San Marcos, TX | L 0–3 | |
| November 1 | Texas A&I* | Evans Field; San Marcos, TX | L 0–7 | |
| November 8 | Sam Houston State | Evans Field; San Marcos, TX (rivalry) | W 19–0 | |
| November 15 | at East Texas State | Commerce, TX | L 0–7 | |
| November 22 | North Texas State Teachers | Evans Field; San Marcos, TX | L 0–6 | |
*Non-conference game
