= 1934 Southwest Texas State Bobcats football team =

American college football season

1934 Southwest Texas State Bobcats football
- Conference: Lone Star Conference
- Record: 2–7–1 (3–1–1 LSC)
- Head coach: Oscar W. Strahan (16th season)
- Home stadium: Evans Field

1934 Lone Star Conference football standings
	Conf.					Overall
Team	W		L		T	W		L		T
East Texas State $	4	–	0	–	0	8	–	0	–	0
North Texas State	2	–	2	–	0	5	–	4	–	0
Sam Houston State	2	–	2	–	0	3	–	4	–	2
Stephen F. Austin	1	–	2	–	1	3	–	3	–	2
Southwest Texas State	0	–	3	–	1	2	–	7	–	1
$ – Conference champion

The 1934 Southwest Texas State Bobcats football team was an American football team that represented Southwest Texas State Teachers College (now known as Texas State University) during the 1934 college football season as a member of the Lone Star Conference (LSC). In their 16th year under head coach Oscar W. Strahan, the team compiled an overall record of 2–7–1 with a mark of 1–3–1 in conference play.

== Schedule ==
Date	Opponent	Site	Result	Attendance	Source
September 23	23rd Infantry*	Evans Field; San Marcos, TX	W 13–0		
September 28	Howard Payne*	Evans Field; San Marcos, TX	L 0–4		
October 6	Schreiner*	Evans Field; San Marcos, TX	L 7–20		
October 12	at Stephen F. Austin	Nacogdoches, TX	T 19–19		
October 20	Southwestern (TX)*	Evans Field; San Marcos, TX	L 7–14		
October 26	at Daniel Baker*	Brownwood, TX	L 7–13		
November 2	Trinity (TX)	Evans Field; San Marcos, TX	W 6–0		
November 9	at Sam Houston State	Pritchett Field; Huntsville, TX (rivalry)	L 0–6		
November 17	East Texas State^{†}	Evans Field; San Marcos, TX	L 6–12	3,500	
November 23	at North Texas State Teachers	Eagle Field; Denton, TX	L 0–3		
*Non-conference game; ^{†}Homecoming
