= 1929 Southwest Texas State Bobcats football team =

American college football season

1929 Southwest Texas State Bobcats football

TIAA champion
- Conference: Texas Intercollegiate Athletic Association
- Record: 6–1–2 (4–0–2 TIAA)
- Head coach: Oscar W. Strahan (11th season)
- Captain: Cotton Branum

1929 Texas Intercollegiate Athletic Association football standings
	Conf.					Overall
Team	W		L		T	W		L		T
Southwest Texas State $	4	–	0	–	2	6	–	1	–	2
North Texas State Teachers	2	–	0	–	2	4	–	3	–	2
McMurry	3	–	1	–	1	4	–	1	–	3
Abilene Christian	2	–	1	–	1	6	–	1	–	1
Sam Houston State	2	–	1	–	1	6	–	3	–	1
West Texas State	2	–	2	–	0	6	–	3	–	1
Stephen F. Austin	1	–	3	–	1	1	–	7	–	2
Sul Ross	0	–	1	–	1	1	–	3	–	3
East Texas State	0	–	3	–	1	0	–	6	–	1
Daniel Baker	0	–	4	–	0	3	–	6	–	1
$ – Conference champion

The 1929 Southwest Texas State Bobcats football team was an American football team that represented Southwest Texas State Teachers College—now known as Texas State University–as a member of the Texas Intercollegiate Athletic Association (TIAA) during the 1929 college football season. Led by 11th-year head coach Oscar W. Strahan, the Bobcats finished the season with an overall record of 6–1–2 and a conference mark of 4–0–2, winning the TIAA title. The team's captain was Cotton Branum.

== Schedule ==
Date	Opponent	Site	Result	Source
September 27	Stephen F. Austin	Evans Field; San Marcos, TX	W 24–7	
October 4	at Howard Payne*	Brownwood, TX	L 0–34	
October 12	Texas A&I*	Evans Field; San Marcos, TX	W 32–0	
October 19	Abilene Christian	Evans Field; San Marcos, TX	T 12–12	
October 25	vs. Sul Ross	Uvalde, TX	W 15–6	
November 2	at McMurry	Donaldson Field; Abilene, TX	W 13–7	
November 8	at Southwestern (TX)*	Georgetown, TX	W 12–9	
November 18	at Daniel Baker	Brownwood, TX	W 12–0	
November 27	North Texas State Teachers	Evans Field; San Marcos, TX	T 0–0	
*Non-conference game
