= 1926 Simmons Cowboys football team =

American college football season

1926 Simmons Cowboys football

Texas Conference champion
- Conference: Texas Conference
- Record: 6–1–3 (2–0–1 Texas)
- Head coach: Victor Payne (1st season)
- Home stadium: Parramore Field

1926 Texas Conference football standings
	Conf.					Overall
Team	W		L		T	W		L		T
Simmons (TX) $	2	–	0	–	1	6	–	3	–	1
Howard Payne	3	–	1	–	0	4	–	4	–	1
Trinity (TX)	2	–	1	–	1	3	–	5	–	2
Austin	1	–	2	–	0	4	–	5	–	0
Southwestern (TX)	0	–	4	–	0	0	–	9	–	0
$ – Conference champion

The 1926 Simmons Cowboys football team was an American football team that represented Simmons University—now known as Hardin–Simmons University—as a member of the Texas Conference during the 1926 college football season. In its first and only season under head coach Victor Payne, the team compiled a 6–1–3 record and outscored all opponents by a total of 85 to 46. The team played its home games at Parramore Field in Abilene, Texas. Simmons won the Texas Conference title with a mark of 2–0–1.

== Schedule ==
Date	Opponent	Site	Result	Attendance	Source
September 25	St. Mary's (TX)*	Parramore Field; Abilene, TX	W 13–2		
October 2	at St. Edward's*	Texas Memorial Stadium; Austin, TX	W 7–0		
October 8	at Southwestern (TX)	Georgetown, TX	W 5–0		
October 15	Texas Tech*	Parramore Field; Abilene, TX	T 0–0	3,000	
October 23	at West Texas State*	Buffalo Stadium; Canyon, TX	W 3–2		
October 30	Daniel Baker*	Parramore Field; Abilene, TX	L 7–27		
November 5	at North Texas State Teachers*	Eagle Field; Denton, TX	T 7–7		
November 11	Trinity (TX)	Parramore Field; Abilene, TX	T 0–0		
November 17	East Texas State*	Parramore Field; Abilene, TX	W 30–2		
November 25	at Howard Payne	Brownwood, TX	W 13–6		
*Non-conference game
