= 1933 Southwest Texas State Bobcats football team =

American college football season

1933 Southwest Texas State Bobcats football
- Conference: Lone Star Conference
- Record: 7–1–1 (3–1–1 LSC)
- Head coach: Oscar W. Strahan (15th season)
- Home stadium: Evans Field

1933 Lone Star Conference football standings
	Conf.					Overall
Team	W		L		T	W		L		T
East Texas State $	5	–	0	–	0	5	–	2	–	1
Southwest Texas State	3	–	1	–	1	7	–	1	–	1
North Texas State	2	–	2	–	1	3	–	4	–	2
Sam Houston State	1	–	2	–	2	3	–	4	–	2
Trinity (TX)	1	–	3	–	1	2	–	5	–	2
Stephen F. Austin	0	–	4	–	1	0	–	6	–	1
$ – Conference champion

The 1933 Southwest Texas State Bobcats football team was an American football team that represented Southwest Texas State Teachers College (now known as Texas State University) during the 1933 college football season as a member of the Lone Star Conference (LSC). In their 15th year under head coach Oscar W. Strahan, the team compiled an overall record of 7–1–1 with a mark of 3–1–1 in conference play.

== Schedule ==
Date	Opponent	Site	Result	Source
September 29	at Howard Payne*	Brownwood, TX	W 20–12	
October 6	Schreiner*	Evans Field; San Marcos, TX	W 13–0	
October 13	Stephen F. Austin	Evans Field; San Marcos, TX	W 27–0	
October 20	at Southwestern (TX)*	Snyder Field; Georgetown, TX	W 7–0	
October 27	Daniel Baker*	Evans Field; San Marcos, TX	W 7–6	
November 3	at Trinity (TX)	Yoakum Field; Waxahachie, TX	W 7–0	
November 10	Sam Houston State	Evans Field; San Marcos, TX (rivalry)	W 3–0	
November 17	at East Texas State	Commerce, TX	L 0–6	
November 24	North Texas State Teachers	Evans Field; San Marcos, TX	T 0–0	
*Non-conference game
