= 1933 Sam Houston State Bearkats football team =

American college football season

1933 Sam Houston State Bearkats football
- Conference: Lone Star Conference
- Record: 3–4–2 (1–2–2 LSC)
- Head coach: J. W. Jones (11th season)
- Home stadium: Pritchett Field

1933 Lone Star Conference football standings
	Conf.					Overall
Team	W		L		T	W		L		T
East Texas State $	5	–	0	–	0	5	–	2	–	1
Southwest Texas State	3	–	1	–	1	7	–	1	–	1
North Texas State	2	–	2	–	1	3	–	4	–	2
Sam Houston State	1	–	2	–	2	3	–	4	–	2
Trinity (TX)	1	–	3	–	1	2	–	5	–	2
Stephen F. Austin	0	–	4	–	1	0	–	6	–	1
$ – Conference champion

The 1933 Sam Houston State Bearkats football team represented Sam Houston State Teachers College (now known as Sam Houston State University) as a member of the Lone Star Conference (LSC) during the 1933 college football season. Led by 11th-year head coach J. W. Jones, the Bearkats compiled an overall record of 3–4–2 with a mark of 1–2–2 in conference play, and finished fourth in the LSC.

== Schedule ==
Date	Opponent	Site	Result	Source
September 22	Blinn*	Pritchett Field; Huntsville, TX	W 45–0	
September 29	at Southwestern (TX)*	Snyder Field; Georgetown, TX	W 10–6	
October 6	Texas A&M*	Pritchett Field; Huntsville, TX	L 14–34	
October 13	Trinity (TX)	Pritchett Field; Huntsville, TX	T 0–0	
October 20	East Texas State	Pritchett Field; Huntsville, TX	L 13–14	
October 27	Texas A&I*	Pritchett Field; Huntsville, TX	L 7–36	
November 3	at North Texas State	Eagle Field; Denton, TX	W 19–7	
November 10	at Southwest Texas State	Evans Field; San Marcos, TX (rivalry)	L 0–3	
November 25	at Stephen F. Austin	Birdwell Field; Nacogdoches, TX (rivalry)	T 6–6	
*Non-conference game
