= 1933 North Texas State Teachers Eagles football team =

American college football season

1933 North Texas State Teachers Eagles football
- Conference: Lone Star Conference
- Record: 3–4–2 (2–2–1 LSC)
- Head coach: Jack Sisco (5th season)
- Home stadium: Eagle Field

1933 Lone Star Conference football standings
	Conf.					Overall
Team	W		L		T	W		L		T
East Texas State $	5	–	0	–	0	5	–	2	–	1
Southwest Texas State	3	–	1	–	1	7	–	1	–	1
North Texas State	2	–	2	–	1	3	–	4	–	2
Sam Houston State	1	–	2	–	2	3	–	4	–	2
Trinity (TX)	1	–	3	–	1	2	–	5	–	2
Stephen F. Austin	0	–	4	–	1	0	–	6	–	1
$ – Conference champion

The 1933 North Texas State Teachers Eagles football team was an American football team that represented the North Texas State Teachers College (now known as the University of North Texas) during the 1933 college football season as a member of the Lone Star Conference. In their fifth year under head coach Jack Sisco, the team compiled a 3–4–2 record.

== Schedule ==
Date	Opponent	Site	Result	Attendance	Source
September 23	at SMU*	Ownby Stadium; University Park, TX (rivalry)	W 7–0		
September 29	TCU*	Eagle Field; Denton, TX	L 0–13	5,000	
October 6	Southwestern (TX)*	Eagle Field; Denton, TX	T 0–0		
October 13	Abilene Christian*	Eagle Field; Denton, TX	L 0–6		
October 27	at Stephen F. Austin	Nacogdoches, TX	W 22–6		
November 3	Sam Houston State	Eagle Field; Denton, TX	L 7–19		
November 11	East Texas State	Eagle Field; Denton, TX	L 0–6		
November 17	at Trinity (TX)	Waxahachie, TX	W 13–0		
November 24	at Southwest Texas State	Evans Field; San Marcos, TX	T 0–0		
*Non-conference game
