= Jack Sisco =

American football player, coach, and official (1904–1983)

- Sisco pictured in The Yucca 1940, North Texas State Teachers yearbook

Biographical details
- Born: November 2, 1904; Waco, Texas, U.S.
- Died: December 18, 1983 (aged 79); Navarro County, Texas, U.S.

Playing career
- 1924–1926: Baylor
- Position: Lineman

Coaching career (HC unless noted)

Football
- 1929–1941: North Texas State Teachers

Basketball
- 1933–1935: North Texas State Teachers

Head coaching record
- Overall: 74–37–10 (football); 15–27 (basketball)

Accomplishments and honors

Championships
- 1 TIAA (1931); 6 LSC (1932, 1935, 1936, 1939–1941); 1 TIAA Eastern Division (1931)

Robert Dickey "Jack" Sisco (November 2, 1904 – December 18, 1983) was an American football player, coach, and official. He served as head football coach at the University of North Texas from 1929 to 1941. With a record of 74–37–10, Sisco is the second winningest coach in school history, behind Odus Mitchell. His teams won seven conference championships and tied for three others.

A native of Waco, Texas, Sisco prepped at Waco High School playing under coach Paul Tyson. He went on to attend Baylor University, where he was a lineman on the 1924 Baylor Bears football team that won the Southwest Conference title.

After his coaching career, he became a college football referee best remembered for a controversial call in the 1947 Red River Shootout between the Texas Longhorns and Oklahoma Sooners. To this day, some Sooner fans refer to this as the "Sisco Game".

His great-granddaughter, Emilee Sisco, played volleyball at the University of Colorado.

== Head coaching record ==
=== Football ===
Year	Team	Overall	Conference	Standing	Bowl/playoffs
North Texas State Teachers Eagles (Texas Intercollegiate Athletic Association) (1929–1931)
1929	North Texas State Teachers	4–3–2	2–0–2	2nd	
1930	North Texas State Teachers	5–4–1	4–1	3rd	
1931	North Texas State Teachers	8–3	4–0	1st (Eastern)	
North Texas State Teachers Eagles (Lone Star Conference) (1932–1941)
1932	North Texas State Teachers	8–1–1	5–0	1st	
1933	North Texas State Teachers	3–4–2	2–2–1	3rd	
1934	North Texas State Teachers	5–4	2–2	T–2nd	
1935	North Texas State Teachers	5–3–1	3–1	T–1st	
1936	North Texas State Teachers	6–2–1	4–0	1st	
1937	North Texas State Teachers	4–4–2	2–1–1	2nd	
1938	North Texas State Teachers	7–4	2–2	3rd	
1939	North Texas State Teachers	6–1	4–0	1st	
1940	North Texas State Teachers	6–3	4–0	1st	
1941	North Texas State Teachers	7–1	4–0	1st	
North Texas State Teachers:		74–37–10	42–9–4		
Total:		74–37–10			
