= 1931 SMU Mustangs football team =

American college football season

1931 SMU Mustangs football

SWC champion
- Conference: Southwest Conference
- Record: 9–1–1 (5–0–1 SWC)
- Head coach: Ray Morrison (12th season)
- Captain: Alfred Neeley
- Home stadium: Ownby Stadium, Fair Park Stadium

1931 Southwest Conference football standings
| | Conf. | | | | | Overall |
| Team | W | | L | | T | W | | L | | T |
|---|---|---|---|---|---|---|---|---|---|---|
| SMU $ | 5 | – | 0 | – | 1 | 9 | – | 1 | – | 1 |
| TCU | 4 | – | 1 | – | 1 | 8 | – | 2 | – | 1 |
| Texas A&M | 3 | – | 2 | – | 0 | 7 | – | 3 | – | 0 |
| Rice | 3 | – | 3 | – | 0 | 6 | – | 4 | – | 0 |
| Texas | 2 | – | 3 | – | 0 | 6 | – | 4 | – | 0 |
| Baylor | 1 | – | 5 | – | 0 | 3 | – | 6 | – | 0 |
| Arkansas | 0 | – | 4 | – | 0 | 3 | – | 5 | – | 1 |
$ – Conference champion

The 1931 SMU Mustangs football team represented Southern Methodist University (SMU) as a member the Southwest Conference (SWC) during the 1931 college football season. Led by 12th head coach Ray Morrison, the Mustangs compiled and overall record of 9–1–1 with a mark of 5–0–1 in conference play, and finished as SWC champion.

== Schedule ==
| Date | Opponent | Site | Result | Attendance | Source |
|---|---|---|---|---|---|
| September 26 | North Texas State Teachers* | Ownby Stadium; University Park, TX (rivalry) | W 13–0 | | |
| October 3 | Simmons (TX)* | Ownby Stadium; University Park, TX | W 27–10 | | |
| October 10 | at Arkansas | The Hill; Fayetteville, AR | W 42–6 | | |
| October 17 | at Rice | Rice Field; Houston, TX (rivalry) | W 21–12 | | |
| October 24 | Centenary* | Fair Park Stadium; Dallas, TX | W 19–0 | | |
| October 31 | Texas | Ownby Stadium; University Park, TX | W 9–7 | 20,000–24,000 | |
| November 7 | at Texas A&M | Kyle Field; College Station, TX | W 8–0 | | |
| November 14 | Baylor | Fair Park Stadium; Dallas, TX | W 6–0 | | |
| November 21 | at Navy* | Thompson Stadium; Annapolis, MD (rivalry) | W 13–6 | 7,000 | |
| November 28 | at TCU | Amon G. Carter Stadium; Fort Worth, TX (rivalry) | T 0–0 | 15,000 | |
| December 5 | at Saint Mary's* | Kezar Stadium; San Francisco, CA | L 2–7 | 50,000 | |
*Non-conference game
