= 1934 Sam Houston State Bearkats football team =

American college football season

1934 Sam Houston State Bearkats football
- Conference: Lone Star Conference
- Record: 3–4–2 (2–2 LSC)
- Head coach: J. W. Jones (12th season)
- Home stadium: Pritchett Field

1934 Lone Star Conference football standings
	Conf.					Overall
Team	W		L		T	W		L		T
East Texas State $	4	–	0	–	0	8	–	0	–	0
North Texas State	2	–	2	–	0	5	–	4	–	0
Sam Houston State	2	–	2	–	0	3	–	4	–	2
Stephen F. Austin	1	–	2	–	1	3	–	3	–	2
Southwest Texas State	0	–	3	–	1	2	–	7	–	1
$ – Conference champion

The 1934 Sam Houston State Bearkats football team represented Sam Houston State Teachers College (now known as Sam Houston State University) as a member of the Lone Star Conference (LSC) during the 1934 college football season. Led by 12th-year head coach J. W. Jones, the Bearkats compiled an overall record of 3–4–2 with a mark of 2–2 in conference play, and finished tied for second in the LSC.

== Schedule ==
Date	Opponent	Site	Result	Attendance	Source
September 22	at Texas A&M*	Kyle Field; College Station, TX	L 0–28	5,000	
September 29	Southwestern (TX)*	Pritchett Field; Huntsville, TX	T 0–0		
October 5	at East Central*	Ada, OK	T 6–6		
October 19	at East Texas State	Commerce, TX	L 0–6		
October 27	Abilene Christian*	Pritchett Field; Huntsville, TX	W 13–0		
November 2	North Texas State	Pritchett Field; Huntsville, TX	W 7–0		
November 9	Southwest Texas State	Pritchett Field; Huntsville, TX (rivalry)	W 6–0		
November 16	vs. Southwestern Louisiana*	Lake Charles H. S. Stadium; Lake Charles, LA	L 7–20		
November 24	Stephen F. Austin	Pritchett Field; Huntsville, TX (rivalry)	L 6–7		
*Non-conference game
