= 1926 Daniel Baker Hill Billies football team =

American college football season

1926 Daniel Baker Hill Billies football

TIAA champion
- Conference: Texas Intercollegiate Athletic Association
- Record: 7–2–1 (4–0 TIAA)
- Head coach: Shorty Ransom (2nd season)
- Captain: Wyman McInnis

1926 Texas Intercollegiate Athletic Association football standings
	Conf.					Overall
Team	W		L		T	W		L		T
Daniel Baker $	4	–	0	–	0	7	–	2	–	1
North Texas State Teachers	4	–	1	–	0	5	–	3	–	1
Southwest Texas State	4	–	1	–	0	7	–	2	–	0
Sam Houston State	4	–	1	–	0	5	–	3	–	1
Abilene Christian	2	–	2	–	0	4	–	4	–	0
McMurry	1	–	2	–	0	1	–	9	–	0
Stephen F. Austin	1	–	3	–	0	5	–	5	–	0
St. Edward's	0	–	2	–	0	4	–	6	–	0
West Texas State	0	–	4	–	0	2	–	6	–	0
East Texas State	0	–	5	–	0	0	–	7	–	0
$ – Conference champion

The 1926 Daniel Baker Hill Billies football team represented Daniel Baker College as a member of the Texas Intercollegiate Athletic Association (TIAA) during the 1926 college football season. Led by Shorty Ransom in his second season as head coach, the team went 7–2–1. Daniel Baker won the TIAA title with a 4–0 mark in conference play.

== Schedule ==
Date	Opponent	Site	Result	Source
September 25	at TCU*	Clark Field; Fort Worth, TX	L 3–5	
October 1	McMurry	Brownwood, TX	W 30–0	
October 9	Austin*	Brownwood, TX	W 22–0	
October 16	at West Texas State	Canyon, TX	W 14–0	
October 23	St. Mary's (TX)*		W 7–0	
October 30	at Simmons (TX)*	Parramore Field; Abilene, TX	W 27–7	
November 5	Texas Tech*	Brownwood, TX	T 0–0	
November 11	St. Edward's	Daniel Baker Park; Brownwood, TX	W 10–0	
November 18	Schreiner*	Brownwood, TX	L 0–10	
November 25	Abilene Christian	Brownwood, TX	W 13–6	
*Non-conference game
