= 1931 Baylor Bears football team =

American college football season

1931 Baylor Bears football
- Conference: Southwest Conference
- Record: 3–6 (1–5 SWC)
- Head coach: Morley Jennings (6th season)
- Captain: Maurice S. Pierce
- Home stadium: Carroll Field

1931 Southwest Conference football standings
| | Conf. | | | | | Overall |
| Team | W | | L | | T | W | | L | | T |
|---|---|---|---|---|---|---|---|---|---|---|
| SMU $ | 5 | – | 0 | – | 1 | 9 | – | 1 | – | 1 |
| TCU | 4 | – | 1 | – | 1 | 8 | – | 2 | – | 1 |
| Texas A&M | 3 | – | 2 | – | 0 | 7 | – | 3 | – | 0 |
| Rice | 3 | – | 3 | – | 0 | 6 | – | 4 | – | 0 |
| Texas | 2 | – | 3 | – | 0 | 6 | – | 4 | – | 0 |
| Baylor | 1 | – | 5 | – | 0 | 3 | – | 6 | – | 0 |
| Arkansas | 0 | – | 4 | – | 0 | 3 | – | 5 | – | 1 |
$ – Conference champion

The 1931 Baylor Bears football team represented Baylor University in the Southwest Conference (SWC) during the 1931 college football season. In their sixth season under head coach Morley Jennings, the Bears compiled a 3–6 record (1–5 against conference opponents), finished in sixth place in the conference, and were outscored by opponents by a combined total of 134 to 100. They played their home games at Carroll Field in Waco, Texas. Maurice S. Pierce was the team captain.

== Schedule ==
| Date | Opponent | Site | Result | Source |
|---|---|---|---|---|
| October 3 | St. Edward's* | Carroll Field; Waco, TX | W 23–0 | |
| October 10 | at Centenary* | Fairgrounds Stadium; Shreveport, LA | L 13–24 | |
| October 17 | Arkansas | Carroll Field; Waco, TX | W 19–7 | |
| October 24 | at Texas A&M | Kyle Field; College Station, TX (rivalry) | L 7–33 | |
| October 31 | Texas Tech* | Carroll Field; Waco, TX (rivalry) | W 32–0 | |
| November 7 | at Texas | Memorial Stadium; Austin, TX (rivalry) | L 0–25 | |
| November 14 | at SMU | Ownby Stadium; University Park, TX | L 0–6 | |
| November 21 | TCU^{†} | Carroll Field; Waco, TX (rivalry) | L 6–19 | |
| November 28 | at Rice | Rice Field; Houston, TX | L 0–20 | |
*Non-conference game; ^{†}Homecoming
