= 1929 Texas A&M Aggies football team =

American college football season

1929 Texas A&M Aggies football
- Conference: Southwest Conference
- Record: 5–4 (2–3 SWC)
- Head coach: Matty Bell (1st season)
- Home stadium: Kyle Field

1929 Southwest Conference football standings
| | Conf. | | | | | Overall |
| Team | W | | L | | T | W | | L | | T |
|---|---|---|---|---|---|---|---|---|---|---|
| No. 8 TCU $ | 4 | – | 0 | – | 1 | 9 | – | 0 | – | 1 |
| No. 9 SMU | 3 | – | 0 | – | 2 | 6 | – | 0 | – | 4 |
| Arkansas | 3 | – | 2 | – | 0 | 7 | – | 2 | – | 0 |
| Texas | 2 | – | 2 | – | 2 | 5 | – | 2 | – | 2 |
| Baylor | 2 | – | 2 | – | 1 | 7 | – | 3 | – | 1 |
| Texas A&M | 2 | – | 3 | – | 0 | 5 | – | 3 | – | 0 |
| Rice | 0 | – | 5 | – | 0 | 2 | – | 7 | – | 0 |
$ – Conference champion; Rankings from Dickinson System

The 1929 Texas A&M Aggies football team represented the Agricultural and Mechanical College of Texas—now known as Texas A&M University—in the Southwest Conference (SWC) during the 1929 college football season. In its first season under head coach Matty Bell, the team compiled an overall record of 5–4, with a mark of 2–3 in conference play, and finished sixth in the SWC.

== Schedule ==
| Date | Opponent | Site | Result | Attendance | Source |
|---|---|---|---|---|---|
| September 28 | Southwestern (TX)* | Kyle Field; College Station, TX | W 54–7 | | |
| October 5 | at Tulane* | Tulane Stadium; New Orleans, LA | L 10–13 | | |
| October 12 | vs. Kansas State* | Fair Park Stadium; Dallas, TX | W 19–0 | | |
| October 19 | at TCU | Clark Field; Fort Worth, TX (rivalry) | L 7–13 | 14,000 | |
| October 26 | Arkansas | Kyle Field; College Station, TX (rivalry) | L 13–14 | | |
| November 2 | Stephen F. Austin* | Kyle Field; College Station, TX | W 54–0 | | |
| November 9 | SMU | Kyle Field; College Station, TX | L 7–12 | 6,000 | |
| November 16 | at Rice | Rice Field; Houston, TX | W 26–6 | | |
| November 28 | Texas | Kyle Field; College Station, TX (rivalry) | W 13–0 | | |
*Non-conference game
