= 1929 Texas Longhorns football team =

American college football season

1929 Texas Longhorns football
- Conference: Southwest Conference
- Record: 5–2–2 (2–2–2 SWC)
- Head coach: Clyde Littlefield (3rd season)
- Captain: Gordy Brown
- Home stadium: War Memorial Stadium

1929 Southwest Conference football standings
	Conf.					Overall
Team	W		L		T	W		L		T
No. 8 TCU $	4	–	0	–	1	9	–	0	–	1
No. 9 SMU	3	–	0	–	2	6	–	0	–	4
Arkansas	3	–	2	–	0	7	–	2	–	0
Texas	2	–	2	–	2	5	–	2	–	2
Baylor	2	–	2	–	1	7	–	3	–	1
Texas A&M	2	–	3	–	0	5	–	3	–	0
Rice	0	–	5	–	0	2	–	7	–	0
$ – Conference champion; Rankings from Dickinson System

The 1929 Texas Longhorns football team was an American football team that represented the University of Texas (now known as the University of Texas at Austin) as a member of the Southwest Conference (SWC) during the 1929 college football season. In their third year under head coach Clyde Littlefield, the Longhorns compiled an overall record of 5–2–2, with a mark of 2–2–2 in conference play, tying for fourth place in the SWC.

== Schedule ==
Date	Opponent	Site	Result	Source
September 28	St. Edwards*	War Memorial Stadium; Austin, TX	W 13–0	
October 5	Centenary*	War Memorial Stadium; Austin, TX	W 20–0	
October 12	at Arkansas	The Hill; Fayetteville, AR (rivalry)	W 27–0	
October 19	vs. Oklahoma*	Fair Park Stadium; Dallas, TX (rivalry)	W 21–0	
October 26	Rice	War Memorial Stadium; Austin, TX (rivalry)	W 39–0	
November 2	at SMU	Ownby Stadium; University Park, TX	T 0–0	
November 9	Baylor	War Memorial Stadium; Austin, TX (rivalry)	T 0–0	
November 16	TCU	War Memorial Stadium; Austin, TX (rivalry)	L 12–15	
November 28	at Texas A&M	Kyle Field; College Station, TX (rivalry)	L 0–13	
*Non-conference game
