= Oscar W. Strahan =

American sports coach and administrator (1891–1978)

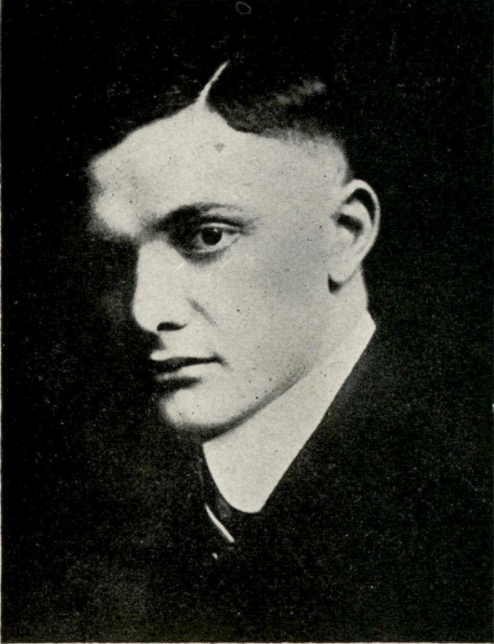
- Strahan pictured in The Pedagog 1921, Southwest Texas State yearbook

Biographical details
- Born: August 10, 1891
- Died: August 21, 1978 (aged 87)

Playing career

Football
- 1911–1913: Drake

Coaching career (HC unless noted)

Football
- 1919–1934: Southwest Texas State

Basketball
- 1920–1924: Southwest Texas State
- 1944–1946: Southwest Texas State

Administrative career (AD unless noted)
- 1919–1958: Southwest Texas State

Head coaching record
- Overall: 72–52–10 (college football); 22–68 (college basketball)

Accomplishments and honors

Championships
- Football; 1 TIAA (1929)

Oscar William Strahan (August 10, 1891 – August 21, 1978) was an American football, basketball, and track coach and college athletics administrator. He was a student-athlete at Drake University in Des Moines, Iowa where he was a recipient of the school's Double D Award.

After coaching high school athletics in Iowa for three years, he became the head football coach (1919–1934) and head basketball coach (1920–1924, 1944–1946) at Southwest Texas State University–now known as Texas State University. He also served as the school's athletic director until his retirement and coach track for 39 years.

Strahan died on August 21, 1978.

== Head coaching record ==
=== College football ===
Year	Team	Overall	Conference	Standing	Bowl/playoffs
Southwest Texas State Bobcats (Independent) (1919–1921)
1919	Southwest Texas State	4–4			
1920	Southwest Texas State	5–2–1			
1921	Southwest Texas State	7–0			
Southwest Texas State Bobcats (Texas Intercollegiate Athletic Association) (1922–1931)
1922	Southwest Texas State	3–3	0–3	T–9th	
1923	Southwest Texas State	4–4	3–4	9th	
1924	Southwest Texas State	5–3	4–2	T–3rd	
1925	Southwest Texas State	2–6–1	1–6	12th	
1926	Southwest Texas State	7–2	4–1	T–2nd	
1927	Southwest Texas State	4–4–1	3–1–1	T–3rd	
1928	Southwest Texas State	2–7	2–3	7th	
1929	Southwest Texas State	6–1–2	4–0–2	1st	
1930	Southwest Texas State	5–1–3	3–1–2	4th	
1931	Southwest Texas State	4–4	2–3	4th (Eastern)	
Southwest Texas State Bobcats (Lone Star Conference) (1932–1934)
1932	Southwest Texas State	5–3	3–1	2nd	
1933	Southwest Texas State	7–1–1	3–1–1	2nd	
1934	Southwest Texas State	2–7–1	0–3–1	5th	
Southwest Texas State:		72–52–10	32–29–7		
Total:		72–52–10			
National championship Conference title Conference division title or championship game berth
