= 1929 SMU Mustangs football team =

American college football season

1929 SMU Mustangs football
- Conference: Southwest Conference
- Record: 6–0–4 (3–0–2 SWC)
- Head coach: Ray Morrison (10th season)
- Captain: Vernon Tarrance
- Home stadium: Ownby Stadium, Fair Park Stadium

1929 Southwest Conference football standings
	Conf.					Overall
Team	W		L		T	W		L		T
No. 8 TCU $	4	–	0	–	1	9	–	0	–	1
No. 9 SMU	3	–	0	–	2	6	–	0	–	4
Arkansas	3	–	2	–	0	7	–	2	–	0
Texas	2	–	2	–	2	5	–	2	–	2
Baylor	2	–	2	–	1	7	–	3	–	1
Texas A&M	2	–	3	–	0	5	–	3	–	0
Rice	0	–	5	–	0	2	–	7	–	0
$ – Conference champion; Rankings from Dickinson System

The 1929 SMU Mustangs football team represented Southern Methodist University (SMU) as a member of the Southwest Conference (SWC) during the 1929 college football season. Led by 10th-year head coach Ray Morrison, the Mustangs compiled an overall record of 6–0–4 with a mark of 3–0–2 in conference play, placing second in the SWC.

== Schedule ==
Date	Opponent	Site	Result	Attendance	Source
September 21	North Texas State Teachers*	Ownby Stadium; University Park, TX (rivalry)	W 13–3		
September 28	Howard Payne*	Ownby Stadium; University Park, TX	T 13–13	3,500	
October 5	at Nebraska*	Memorial Stadium; Lincoln, NE	T 0–0		
October 11	Austin*	Ownby Stadium; University Park, TX	W 16–0		
October 26	Ole Miss*	Fair Park Stadium; Dallas, TX	W 52–0	8,000	
November 2	Texas	Ownby Stadium; University Park, TX	T 0–0		
November 9	at Texas A&M	Kyle Field; College Station, TX	W 12–7	6,000	
November 16	Baylor	Ownby Stadium; University Park, TX	W 25–6	18,000	
November 23	Rice	Ownby Stadium; University Park, TX (rivalry)	W 34–0		
November 30	at TCU	Clark Field; Fort Worth, TX (rivalry)	T 7–7	25,000	
*Non-conference game
