= 1934 East Texas State Lions football team =

American college football season

1934 East Texas State Lions football

LSC champion
- Conference: Lone Star Conference
- Record: 8–0 (4–0 LSC)
- Head coach: John W. Rollins (4th season)

1934 Lone Star Conference football standings
	Conf.					Overall
Team	W		L		T	W		L		T
East Texas State $	4	–	0	–	0	8	–	0	–	0
North Texas State	2	–	2	–	0	5	–	4	–	0
Sam Houston State	2	–	2	–	0	3	–	4	–	2
Stephen F. Austin	1	–	2	–	1	3	–	3	–	2
Southwest Texas State	0	–	3	–	1	2	–	7	–	1
$ – Conference champion

The 1934 East Texas State Lions football team represented East Texas State Teachers College—now known as East Texas A&M University–as a member of the Lone Star Conference (LSC) during the 1934 college football season. Led by John W. Rollins in his fourth and final season as head coach, the Lions compiled an overall record of 8–0 with a mark of 4–0 in conference play, winning the LSC title.

== Schedule ==
Date	Opponent	Site	Result	Source
September 28	at Louisiana Normal*	Normalite Field; Natchitoches, LA	W 14–0	
October 5	Stephen F. Austin	Commerce, TX	W 32–0	
October 12	McMurry*	Commerce, TX	W 19–0	
October 19	Sam Houston State	Commerce, TX	W 6–0	
October 26	at Trinity (TX)*	Waxahachie, TX	W 18–0	
November 2	at Southeastern Oklahoma State*	Durant, OK	W 12–0	
November 9	North Texas State Teachers	Commerce, TX	W 3–0	
November 17	at Southwest Texas State	Evans Field; San Marcos, TX	W 12–6	
*Non-conference game
