= 1931 Arkansas Razorbacks football team =

American college football season

1931 Arkansas Razorbacks football
- Conference: Southwest Conference
- Record: 3–5–1 (0–4 SWC)
- Head coach: Fred Thomsen (3rd season)
- Captain: Earl Secrest
- Home stadium: The Hill

1931 Southwest Conference football standings
	Conf.					Overall
Team	W		L		T	W		L		T
SMU $	5	–	0	–	1	9	–	1	–	1
TCU	4	–	1	–	1	8	–	2	–	1
Texas A&M	3	–	2	–	0	7	–	3	–	0
Rice	3	–	3	–	0	6	–	4	–	0
Texas	2	–	3	–	0	6	–	4	–	0
Baylor	1	–	5	–	0	3	–	6	–	0
Arkansas	0	–	4	–	0	3	–	5	–	1
$ – Conference champion

The 1931 Arkansas Razorbacks college football team season represented the University of Arkansas in the Southwest Conference (SWC) during the 1931 college football season. In their third season under head coach Fred Thomsen, the Razorbacks compiled a 3–5–1 record (0–4 against SWC opponents), finished in last place in the SWC, and were outscored by their opponents by a combined total of 126 to 82.

== Schedule ==
Date	Opponent	Site	Result	Attendance	Source
September 26	Ozarks*	The Hill; Fayetteville, AR	W 13–6		
October 3	Hendrix*	The Hill; Fayetteville, AR	W 19–0		
October 10	SMU	The Hill; Fayetteville, AR	L 6–42		
October 17	at Baylor	Carroll Field; Waco, TX	L 7–19		
October 24	vs. LSU*	State Fair Stadium; Shreveport, LA (rivalry)	L 6–13	9,000	
October 31	TCU^{†}	The Hill; Fayetteville, AR	L 0–7	4,000	
November 7	at Chicago*	Stagg Field; Chicago, IL	T 13–13	12,000	
November 21	at Rice	Rice Field; Houston, TX	L 12–26		
November 26	at Centenary*	State Fair Stadium; Shreveport, LA	W 6–0	5,000	
*Non-conference game; ^{†}Homecoming
