= 1931 Rice Owls football team =

American college football season

1931 Rice Owls football
- Conference: Southwest Conference
- Record: 6–4 (3–3 SWC)
- Head coach: Jack Meagher (3rd season)
- Home stadium: Rice Field

1931 Southwest Conference football standings
	Conf.					Overall
Team	W		L		T	W		L		T
SMU $	5	–	0	–	1	9	–	1	–	1
TCU	4	–	1	–	1	8	–	2	–	1
Texas A&M	3	–	2	–	0	7	–	3	–	0
Rice	3	–	3	–	0	6	–	4	–	0
Texas	2	–	3	–	0	6	–	4	–	0
Baylor	1	–	5	–	0	3	–	6	–	0
Arkansas	0	–	4	–	0	3	–	5	–	1
$ – Conference champion

The 1931 Rice Owls football team was an American football team that represented Rice Institute as a member of the Southwest Conference (SWC) during the 1931 college football season. In its third season under head coach Jack Meagher, the team compiled a 6–4 record (3–3 against SWC opponents) and was outscored by a total of 178 to 66.

== Schedule ==
Date	Opponent	Site	Result	Attendance	Source
September 19	Texas A&I*	Rice Field; Houston, TX	W 37–0		
September 26	Sam Houston State*	Rice Field; Houston, TX	W 32–0		
October 3	at Oklahoma*	Memorial Stadium; Norman, OK	L 6–19	10,000	
October 10	at Texas	Memorial Stadium; Austin, TX (rivalry)	W 7–0		
October 17	SMU	Rice Field; Houston, TX (rivalry)	L 12–21		
October 24	at Arizona*	Arizona Stadium; Tucson, AZ	W 32–0	4,000	
November 7	at TCU	Amon G. Carter Stadium; Fort Worth, TX	L 6–7		
November 14	Texas A&M	Rice Field; Houston, TX	L 0–7		
November 21	Arkansas	Rice Field; Houston, TX	W 26–12		
November 28	Baylor	Rice Field; Houston, TX	W 20–0		
*Non-conference game
