= 1929 TCU Horned Frogs football team =

American college football season

1929 TCU Horned Frogs football

SWC champion
- Conference: Southwest Conference
- Record: 9–0–1 (4–0–1 SWC)
- Head coach: Francis Schmidt (1st season)
- Home stadium: Clark Field

1929 Southwest Conference football standings
	Conf.					Overall
Team	W		L		T	W		L		T
No. 8 TCU $	4	–	0	–	1	9	–	0	–	1
No. 9 SMU	3	–	0	–	2	6	–	0	–	4
Arkansas	3	–	2	–	0	7	–	2	–	0
Texas	2	–	2	–	2	5	–	2	–	2
Baylor	2	–	2	–	1	7	–	3	–	1
Texas A&M	2	–	3	–	0	5	–	3	–	0
Rice	0	–	5	–	0	2	–	7	–	0
$ – Conference champion; Rankings from Dickinson System

The 1929 TCU Horned Frogs football team represented Texas Christian University (TCU) as a member the Southwest Conference (SWC) during the 1929 college football season. Led by first-year head coach Francis Schmidt, the Horned Frogs compiled and overall record of 9–0–1 overall with a mark of 4–0–1 in conference play, winning the SWC title. TCU played their home games at Clark Field, located on campus in Fort Worth, Texas.

== Schedule ==
Date	Opponent	Site	Result	Attendance	Source
September 28	Daniel Baker*	Clark Field; Fort Worth, TX	W 61–0		
October 5	vs. Simmons (TX)*	Buckaroo Stadium; Breckenridge, TX	W 20–0		
October 12	at Centenary*	Fairgrounds Stadium; Shreveport, LA	W 28–0	4,500	
October 19	Texas A&M	Clark Field; Fort Worth, TX (rivalry)	W 13–7	14,000	
October 26	at Texas Tech*	Tech Field; Lubbock, TX (rivalry)	W 22–0	6,500	
November 2	North Texas State Teachers*	Clark Field; Fort Worth, TX	W 25–0		
November 9	Rice	Clark Field; Fort Worth, TX	W 24–0		
November 16	at Texas	War Memorial Stadium; Austin, TX (rivalry)	W 15–12		
November 23	at Baylor	Cotton Palace; Waco, TX (rivalry)	W 34–7	15,000	
November 30	SMU	Clark Field; Fort Worth, TX (rivalry)	T 7–7	25,000	
*Non-conference game
