= 1931 Texas Longhorns football team =

American college football season

1931 Texas Longhorns football
- Conference: Southwest Conference
- Record: 6–4 (2–3 SWC)
- Head coach: Clyde Littlefield (5th season)
- Captain: Dutch Baumgarten
- Home stadium: War Memorial Stadium

1931 Southwest Conference football standings
| | Conf. | | | | | Overall |
| Team | W | | L | | T | W | | L | | T |
|---|---|---|---|---|---|---|---|---|---|---|
| SMU $ | 5 | – | 0 | – | 1 | 9 | – | 1 | – | 1 |
| TCU | 4 | – | 1 | – | 1 | 8 | – | 2 | – | 1 |
| Texas A&M | 3 | – | 2 | – | 0 | 7 | – | 3 | – | 0 |
| Rice | 3 | – | 3 | – | 0 | 6 | – | 4 | – | 0 |
| Texas | 2 | – | 3 | – | 0 | 6 | – | 4 | – | 0 |
| Baylor | 1 | – | 5 | – | 0 | 3 | – | 6 | – | 0 |
| Arkansas | 0 | – | 4 | – | 0 | 3 | – | 5 | – | 1 |
$ – Conference champion

The 1931 Texas Longhorns football team was an American football team that represented the University of Texas (now known as the University of Texas at Austin) as a member of the Southwest Conference during the 1931 college football season. In their fifth season under head coach Clyde Littlefield, Texas compiled an 6–4 record and finished fifth in the SWC.

== Schedule ==
| Date | Opponent | Site | Result | Attendance | Source |
|---|---|---|---|---|---|
| September 26 | Simmons (TX)* | War Memorial Stadium; Austin, TX | W 36–0 | | |
| October 3 | Missouri* | War Memorial Stadium; Austin, TX | W 31–0 | | |
| October 10 | Rice | War Memorial Stadium; Austin, TX (rivalry) | L 0–7 | | |
| October 17 | vs. Oklahoma* | Fair Park Stadium; Dallas, TX (Red River Rivalry) | W 3–0 | | |
| October 24 | at Harvard* | Harvard Stadium; Boston, MA | L 7–35 | | |
| October 31 | at SMU | Ownby Stadium; University Park, TX | L | 20,000–24,000 | |
| November 7 | Baylor | War Memorial Stadium; Austin, TX (rivalry) | W 25–0 | | |
| November 14 | TCU | War Memorial Stadium; Austin, TX (rivalry) | W 10–0 | | |
| November 20 | at Centenary* | Fairgrounds Stadium; Shreveport, LA | W 6–0 | | |
| November 26 | at Texas A&M | Kyle Field; College Station, TX (rivalry) | L 6–7 | | |
*Non-conference game
