= 1934 North Texas State Teachers Eagles football team =

American college football season

1934 North Texas State Teachers Eagles football
- Conference: Lone Star Conference
- Record: 5–4 (2–2 LSC)
- Head coach: Jack Sisco (6th season)
- Home stadium: Eagle Field

1934 Lone Star Conference football standings
| | Conf. | | | | | Overall |
| Team | W | | L | | T | W | | L | | T |
|---|---|---|---|---|---|---|---|---|---|---|
| East Texas State $ | 4 | – | 0 | – | 0 | 8 | – | 0 | – | 0 |
| North Texas State | 2 | – | 2 | – | 0 | 5 | – | 4 | – | 0 |
| Sam Houston State | 2 | – | 2 | – | 0 | 3 | – | 4 | – | 2 |
| Stephen F. Austin | 1 | – | 2 | – | 1 | 3 | – | 3 | – | 2 |
| Southwest Texas State | 0 | – | 3 | – | 1 | 2 | – | 7 | – | 1 |
$ – Conference champion

The 1934 North Texas State Teachers Eagles football team represented North Texas State Teachers College–now known as the University of North Texas—as a member of the Lone Star Conference (LSC) during the 1934 college football season. Led by sixth-year head coach Jack Sisco, the Eagles compiled an overall record of 5–4 with a mark of 2–2 in conference play, tying for second place in the LSC.

== Schedule ==
| Date | Time | Opponent | Site | Result | Attendance | Source |
|---|---|---|---|---|---|---|
| September 22 | | at SMU* | Ownby Stadium; University Park, TX | L 0–33 | | |
| September 29 | 3:00 p.m. | at TCU* | Amon G. Carter Stadium; Fort Worth, TX | L 0–27 | 5,000 | |
| October 5 | | at Southwestern (TX)* | Georgetown, TX | W 6–0 | | |
| October 15 | | Abilene Christian* | Eagle Field; Denton, TX | W 6–0 | | |
| October 26 | | Stephen F. Austin | Eagle Field; Denton, TX | W 14–0 | | |
| November 2 | | at Sam Houston State | Pritchett Field; Huntsville, TX | L 0–7 | | |
| November 9 | | at East Texas State | Commerce, TX | L 0–3 | | |
| November 16 | | Trinity (TX)* | Eagle Field; Denton, TX | W 21–9 | | |
| November 23 | | Southwest Texas State | Eagle Field; Denton, TX | W 3–0 | | |
*Non-conference game; All times are in Central time
