= 1929 Baylor Bears football team =

American college football season

1929 Baylor Bears football
- Conference: Southwest Conference
- Record: 7–3–1 (2–3–1 SWC)
- Head coach: Morley Jennings (4th season)
- Captain: Charles Weldon Lucas
- Home stadium: Carroll Field, Cotton Palace

1929 Southwest Conference football standings
	Conf.					Overall
Team	W		L		T	W		L		T
No. 8 TCU $	4	–	0	–	1	9	–	0	–	1
No. 9 SMU	3	–	0	–	2	6	–	0	–	4
Arkansas	3	–	2	–	0	7	–	2	–	0
Texas	2	–	2	–	2	5	–	2	–	2
Baylor	2	–	2	–	1	7	–	3	–	1
Texas A&M	2	–	3	–	0	5	–	3	–	0
Rice	0	–	5	–	0	2	–	7	–	0
$ – Conference champion; Rankings from Dickinson System

The 1929 Baylor Bears football team represented Baylor University in the Southwest Conference (SWC) during the 1929 college football season. In their fourth season under head coach Morley Jennings, the Bears compiled a 7–3–1 record (2–2–1 against conference opponents), finished in fifth place in the conference, and outscored opponents by a combined total of 291 to 106. They played their home games at Cotton Palace in Waco, Texas. Charles Weldon Lucas was the team captain.

== Schedule ==
Date	Opponent	Site	Result	Attendance	Source
September 21	Stephen F. Austin*	Carroll Field; Waco, TX	W 88–0		
September 28	North Texas State Teachers*	Carroll Field; Waco, TX	W 32–0		
October 5	Trinity (TX)*	Carroll Field; Waco, TX	W 43–0		
October 12	St. Edward's*	Carroll Field; Waco, TX	W 19–0		
October 19	Arkansas	Cotton Palace; Waco, TX	W 31–20	5,000	
October 26	at Centenary*	Fairgrounds Stadium; Shreveport, LA	L 12–27		
November 2	Texas Tech*	Cotton Palace; Waco, TX (rivalry)	W 34–0		
November 9	at Texas	War Memorial Stadium; Austin, TX (rivalry)	T 0–0		
November 16	at SMU	Ownby Stadium; University Park, TX	L 6–25	18,000	
November 23	TCU^{†}	Cotton Palace; Waco, TX (rivalry)	L 7–34	15,000	
November 30	at Rice	Rice Field; Houston, TX	W 19–0	4,000	
*Non-conference game; ^{†}Homecoming
