= 1929 Rice Owls football team =

American college football season

1929 Rice Owls football
- Conference: Southwest Conference
- Record: 2–7 (0–5 SWC)
- Head coach: Jack Meagher (1st season)
- Home stadium: Rice Field

1929 Southwest Conference football standings
	Conf.					Overall
Team	W		L		T	W		L		T
No. 8 TCU $	4	–	0	–	1	9	–	0	–	1
No. 9 SMU	3	–	0	–	2	6	–	0	–	4
Arkansas	3	–	2	–	0	7	–	2	–	0
Texas	2	–	2	–	2	5	–	2	–	2
Baylor	2	–	2	–	1	7	–	3	–	1
Texas A&M	2	–	3	–	0	5	–	3	–	0
Rice	0	–	5	–	0	2	–	7	–	0
$ – Conference champion; Rankings from Dickinson System

The 1929 Rice Owls football team was an American football team that represented Rice Institute as a member of the Southwest Conference (SWC) during the 1929 college football season. In its first season under head coach Jack Meagher, the team compiled a 2–7 record (0–5 against SWC opponents) and was outscored by a total of 208 to 34.

== Schedule ==
Date	Opponent	Site	Result	Attendance	Source
September 27	at Loyola (LA)*	Loyola Stadium; New Orleans, LA	L 0–33		
October 5	Sam Houston State*	Rice Field; Houston, TX	W 7–2		
October 12	Southwestern (TX)*	Rice Field; Houston, TX	W 14–6		
October 26	at Texas	War Memorial Stadium; Austin, TX	L 0–39		
November 2	St. Edward's*	Rice Field; Houston, TX	L 7–20		
November 9	at TCU	Clark Field; Fort Worth, TX	L 0–24		
November 16	Texas A&M	Rice Field; Houston, TX	L 6–26		
November 23	at SMU	Ownby Stadium; University Park, TX	L 0–34		
November 30	Baylor	Rice Field; Houston, TX	L 0–19	4,000	
*Non-conference game
