= 1930 Sam Houston State Bearkats football team =

American college football season

1930 Sam Houston State Bearkats football

TIAA champion
- Conference: Texas Intercollegiate Athletic Association
- Record: 9–1 (4–0 TIAA)
- Head coach: J. W. Jones (8th season)
- Home stadium: Pritchett Field

1930 Texas Intercollegiate Athletic Association football standings
	Conf.					Overall
Team	W		L		T	W		L		T
Sam Houston State $	5	–	0	–	0	9	–	1	–	0
West Texas State	4	–	0	–	1	6	–	3	–	1
North Texas State Teachers	4	–	1	–	0	5	–	4	–	1
Southwest Texas State	3	–	1	–	2	5	–	2	–	3
McMurry	3	–	2	–	1	3	–	4	–	2
Daniel Baker	2	–	2	–	2	2	–	7	–	2
Texas A&I	1	–	2	–	1	3	–	3	–	3
Abilene Christian	1	–	3	–	1	2	–	7	–	1
East Texas State	1	–	4	–	0	2	–	7	–	0
Sul Ross	0	–	3	–	0	1	–	7	–	0
Stephen F. Austin	0	–	6	–	0	1	–	7	–	1
$ – Conference champion

The 1930 Sam Houston State Bearkats football team was an American football team that represented Sam Houston State Teachers College (now known as Sam Houston State University) during the 1930 college football season as a member of the Texas Intercollegiate Athletic Association (TIAA). In their 8th year under head coach J. W. Jones, the Bearkats compiled an overall record of 9–1, with a mark of 4–0 in conference play, and finished as TIAA champion.

== Schedule ==
Date	Opponent	Site	Result	Source
September 19	Lon Morris*	Pritchett Field; Huntsville, TX	W 25–0	
September 27	at Rice*	Rice Field; Houston, TX	L 12–13	
October 4	Blinn*	Pritchett Field; Huntsville, TX	W 56–0	
October 11	at Louisiana Normal*	Demon Field; Natchitoches, LA	W 12–2	
October 18	East Central*	Pritchett Field; Huntsville, TX	W 21–15	
October 25	at East Texas State	Commerce, TX	W 21–0	
November 1	at St. Mary's (TX)*	San Antonio, TX	W 12–0	
November 8	at Texas A&I	Kingsville, TX	W 19–0	
November 17	North Texas State Teachers	Pritchett Field; Huntsville, TX	W 13–0	
November 24	Stephen F. Austin	Pritchett Field; Huntsville, TX (rivalry)	W 20–0	
*Non-conference game
