= 1931 Simmons Cowboys football team =

American college football season

1931 Simmons Cowboys football

Texas Conference co-champion
- Conference: Texas Conference
- Record: 6–5 (4–1 Texas)
- Head coach: Les Cranfill (2nd season)

1931 Texas Conference football standings
	Conf.					Overall
Team	W		L		T	W		L		T
Howard Payne +	4	–	1	–	0	6	–	2	–	0
Simmons (TX) +	4	–	1	–	0	6	–	5	–	0
Austin	3	–	2	–	0	3	–	5	–	1
Southwestern (TX)	2	–	3	–	0	4	–	6	–	0
St. Edward's	1	–	3	–	1	1	–	5	–	1
Trinity (TX)	0	–	4	–	1	2	–	6	–	1
+ – Conference co-champions

The 1931 Simmons Cowboys football team represented Simmons University—now known as Hardin–Simmons University—as a member of the Texas Conference during 1931 college football season. Led by Les Cranfill in his second season as head coach, the team went 6–5 overall, sharing the Texas Conference title with Howard Payne.

== Schedule ==
Date	Opponent	Site	Result	Source
September 18	at Daniel Baker*	Brownwood, TX	W 6–0	
September 26	at Texas*	War Memorial Stadium; Austin, TX	L 0–36	
October 3	at SMU*	Ownby Stadium; University Park, TX	L 10–27	
October 9	St. Edward's	Parramore Field; Abilene, TX	W 13–0	
October 17	at Texas Mines*	El Paso HS Stadium; El Paso, TX	W 45–0	
October 23	TCU*	Parramore Field; Abilene, TX	L 0–6	
October 30	Southwestern (TX)	Parramore Field; Abilene, TX	W 53–0	
November 11	at Trinity (TX)	Yoakum Field; Waxahachie, TX	W 46–0	
November 16	Austin	Parramore Field; Abilene, TX	W 20–0	
November 21	Howard Payne	Parramore Field; Abilene, TX	L 0–20	
November 26	Texas Tech*	Parramore Field; Abilene, TX	L 0–6	
*Non-conference game
