= 1929 Arkansas Razorbacks football team =

American college football season

1929 Arkansas Razorbacks football
- Conference: Southwest Conference
- Record: 7–2 (3–2 SWC)
- Head coach: Fred Thomsen (1st season)
- Captain: Clarence Gels
- Home stadium: The Hill

1929 Southwest Conference football standings
	Conf.					Overall
Team	W		L		T	W		L		T
No. 8 TCU $	4	–	0	–	1	9	–	0	–	1
No. 9 SMU	3	–	0	–	2	6	–	0	–	4
Arkansas	3	–	2	–	0	7	–	2	–	0
Texas	2	–	2	–	2	5	–	2	–	2
Baylor	2	–	2	–	1	7	–	3	–	1
Texas A&M	2	–	3	–	0	5	–	3	–	0
Rice	0	–	5	–	0	2	–	7	–	0
$ – Conference champion; Rankings from Dickinson System

The 1929 Arkansas Razorbacks football team represented the University of Arkansas in the Southwest Conference (SWC) during the 1929 college football season. In their first year under head coach Fred Thomsen, the Razorbacks compiled a 7–2 record (3–2 against SWC opponents), finished in sixth place in the SWC, and outscored their opponents by a combined total of 230 to 93.

College Football Hall of Famer Wear Schoonover intercepted an Arkansas record five passes against Texas A&M.

== Schedule ==
Date	Opponent	Site	Result	Attendance	Source
September 28	Ozarks*	The Hill; Fayetteville, AR	W 37–0		
October 5	Henderson State*	The Hill; Fayetteville, AR	W 30–7		
October 12	Texas	The Hill; Fayetteville, AR (rivalry)	L 0–27		
October 19	at Baylor	Cotton Palace; Waco, TX	L 20–31	5,000	
October 26	at Texas A&M	Kyle Field; College Station, TX (rivalry)	W 14–13		
November 2	vs. LSU^	State Fair Stadium; Shreveport, LA (rivalry)	W 32–0	10,000	
November 9	East Central*	The Hill; Fayetteville, AR	W 52–7		
November 16	Centenary*^{†}	The Hill; Fayetteville, AR	W 13–2	5,000	
November 28	at Oklahoma A&M^	Lewis Field; Stillwater, OK	W 32–6		
*Non-conference game; ^{†}Homecoming

^ indicates a designated conference game.

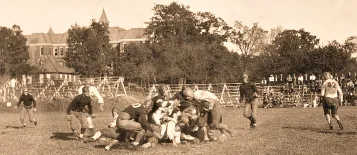
In 1929, Arkansas underwent its first major stadium expansion: adding bleachers to the sidelines
