= Shorty Ransom =

American football coach and administrator (1898–1959)

Biographical details
- Born: November 9, 1898; Butler County, Pennsylvania, U.S.
- Died: May 23, 1959 (aged 60); Lake Jackson, Texas, U.S.

Playing career
- c. 1920: Marietta
- Position: Quarterback

Coaching career (HC unless noted)
- c. 1924: Comanche HS (TX)
- 1925–1927: Daniel Baker
- 1938–1940: Daniel Baker

Administrative career (AD unless noted)
- 1938–?: Daniel Baker

Head coaching record
- Overall: 18–39–4

Accomplishments and honors

Championships
- 1 TIAA (1926)

Ira Edward "Shorty" Ransom (November 9, 1898 – May 23, 1959) was an American football coach and college athletics administrator. He served two stints as the head football coach at Daniel Baker College in Brownwood, Texas, from 1925 to 1927 and 1938 to 1940, compiling a record of 18–39–4. His 1926 Daniel Baker team won the Texas Intercollegiate Athletic Association (TIAA) championship.

Ransom played college football as a quarterback at Marietta College in Marietta, Ohio. He coached at Comanche High School in Comanche, Texas before first coming to Daniel Baker in 1925. In between his two stints at the Brownwood school, Ransom worked in bridge construction and the oil business. He returned to Daniel Baker in 1938 as head football coach and athletic director.

Ransom was a pilot during World War I and a flying instructor during World War II. He later worked in the instrument department at Dow Chemical Company. He died on May 23, 1959.

== Head coaching record ==
Year	Team	Overall	Conference	Standing	Bowl/playoffs
Daniel Baker Hill Billies (Texas Intercollegiate Athletic Association) (1925–1927)
1925	Daniel Baker	2–6–2	0–4–2	13th	
1926	Daniel Baker	7–2–1	4–0	1st	
1927	Daniel Baker	4–5–1	2–2–1	T–5th	
Daniel Baker Hill Billies (Texas Conference) (1938–1940)
1938	Daniel Baker	1–9	1–5	8th	
1939	Daniel Baker	4–6	3–4	7th	
1940	Daniel Baker	0–11	0–6	8th	
Daniel Baker:		18–39–4	10–21–3		
Total:		18–39–4			
National championship Conference title Conference division title or championship game berth
