= 1935 North Texas State Teachers Eagles football team =

American college football season

1935 North Texas State Teachers Eagles football

LSC co-champion
- Conference: Lone Star Conference
- Record: 5–3–1 (3–1 LSC)
- Head coach: Jack Sisco (7th season)
- Home stadium: Eagle Field

1935 Lone Star Conference football standings
| | Conf. | | | | | Overall |
| Team | W | | L | | T | W | | L | | T |
|---|---|---|---|---|---|---|---|---|---|---|
| East Texas State + | 3 | – | 1 | – | 0 | 6 | – | 2 | – | 1 |
| North Texas State + | 3 | – | 1 | – | 0 | 5 | – | 3 | – | 1 |
| Stephen F. Austin + | 3 | – | 1 | – | 0 | 4 | – | 5 | – | 0 |
| Southwest Texas State | 1 | – | 3 | – | 0 | 2 | – | 7 | – | 0 |
| Sam Houston State | 0 | – | 4 | – | 0 | 3 | – | 6 | – | 0 |
+ – Conference co-champions

The 1935 North Texas State Teachers Eagles football team was an American football team that represented the North Texas State Teachers College (now known as the University of North Texas) during the 1935 college football season as a member of the Lone Star Conference. In their seventh year under head coach Jack Sisco, the team compiled a 5–3–1 record.

== Schedule ==
| Date | Opponent | Site | Result | Attendance | Source |
|---|---|---|---|---|---|
| September 21 | at SMU* | Ownby Stadium; University Park, TX (rivalry) | L 0–39 | 7,000 | |
| September 28 | at TCU* | Amon G. Carter Stadium; Fort Worth, TX | L 11–28 | 5,000 | |
| October 4 | Southwestern (TX)* | Eagle Field; Denton, TX | W 34–0 | | |
| October 11 | at Abilene Christian* | Abilene, TX | T 13–13 | | |
| October 25 | at Stephen F. Austin | Nacogdoches, TX | L 7–9 | | |
| November 1 | Sam Houston State | Eagle Field; Denton, TX | W 20–0 | | |
| November 8 | East Texas State | Eagle Field; Denton, TX | W 30–6 | | |
| November 15 | at Trinity (TX)* | Waxahachie, TX | W 13–8 | | |
| November 22 | at Southwest Texas State | Evans Field; San Marcos, TX | W 6–0 | | |
*Non-conference game
