= 1931 North Texas State Teachers Eagles football team =

American college football season

1931 North Texas State Teachers Eagles football

TIAA champion TIAA Eastern Division champion

TIAA Championship Game, W 32–13 vs. Daniel Baker
- Conference: Texas Intercollegiate Athletic Association
- Eastern Division
- Record: 8–3 (4–0 TIAA)
- Head coach: Jack Sisco (3rd season)
- Home stadium: Eagle Field

1931 Texas Intercollegiate Athletic Association football standings
	Conf.					Overall
Team	W		L		T	W		L		T
Eastern Division
North Texas State Teachers x$	4	–	0	–	0	8	–	3	–	0
Texas A&I	4	–	0	–	0	8	–	1	–	0
Sam Houston State	3	–	2	–	0	4	–	5	–	0
Southwest Texas State	2	–	3	–	0	4	–	4	–	0
East Texas State	1	–	4	–	0	3	–	6	–	0
Stephen F. Austin	0	–	5	–	0	1	–	7	–	0
Western Division
Daniel Baker x	3	–	2	–	0	4	–	5	–	0
Abilene Christian	3	–	2	–	0	4	–	5	–	0
West Texas State	2	–	2	–	0	6	–	3	–	0
McMurry	2	–	2	–	0	2	–	6	–	0
Sul Ross	1	–	3	–	0	3	–	5	–	0
Championship: North Texas State Teachers 32, Daniel Baker 13
$ – Conference champion; x – Division champion/co-champions; y – Championship game participant

The 1931 North Texas State Teachers Eagles football team was an American football team that represented the North Texas State Teachers College (now known as the University of North Texas) during the 1931 college football season as a member of the Texas Intercollegiate Athletic Association. In their third year under head coach Jack Sisco, the team compiled a 8–3 record.

== Schedule ==
Date	Opponent	Site	Result	Source
September 19	at TCU*	Amon G. Carter Stadium; Fort Worth, TX	L 6–33	
September 26	at SMU*	Ownby Stadium; University Park, TX (rivalry)	L 0–13	
October 2	at Austin*	Sherman, TX	W 21–6	
October 9	Southwestern (TX)*	Eagle Field; Denton, TX	W 25–0	
October 16	at Trinity (TX)*	Yoakum Field; Waxahachie, TX	L 0–7	
October 23	Abilene Christian*	Eagle Field; Denton, TX	W 6–0	
October 31	at Stephen F. Austin	Birdwell Field; Nacogdoches, TX	W 33–0	
November 11	East Texas State	Eagle Field; Denton, TX	W 13–0	
November 16	Sam Houston State	Eagle Field; Denton, TX	W 19–0	
November 25	at Southwest Texas State	Evans Field; San Marcos, TX	W 20–0	
December 9	Daniel Baker*	Eagle Field; Denton, TX (TIAA Championship Game)	W 32–13	
*Non-conference game
