= J. W. Jones (American football) =

American athlete and coach (1894–1981)

Biographical details
- Born: October 5, 1894; Whitesboro, Texas, U.S.
- Died: February 3, 1981 (aged 86); Dallas, Texas, U.S.
- Education: Wentworth Military

Coaching career (HC unless noted)

Football
- 1915: Austin
- 1919–1921: Southwest Military Academy
- 1922: Wichita Falls HS (TX)
- 1923–1935: Sam Houston State

Basketball
- 1922–1936: Sam Houston State

Administrative career (AD unless noted)
- 1923–1936: Sam Houston State

Head coaching record
- Overall: 57–57–11 (college football); 111–109 (college basketball)

Accomplishments and honors

Championships
- Football; 1 TIAA (1930) Basketball; 1 TIAA regular season (1925); 1 LSC regular season (1934)

James William Jones Sr. (October 5, 1894 – February 3, 1981) was an American college football and basketball player and coach. He served as the head football coach at Austin College in 1915 and at Sam Houston State University from 1923 to 1935, compiling a career college football coaching record of 57–57–12. Jones was also the head basketball coach at Sam Houston State from 1922 to 1936, and the school's athletic director during the same span.

Joes played football at Wentworth Military Academy and Washington and Lee University.

== Head coaching record ==
=== College football ===
Year	Team	Overall	Conference	Standing	Bowl/playoffs
Austin Kangaroos (Texas Intercollegiate Athletic Association) (1915)
1915	Austin	3–4–2			
Austin:		3–4–2			
Sam Houston State Bearkats (Texas Intercollegiate Athletic Association) (1923–1931)
1923	Sam Houston State	4–4	3–3	T–7th	
1924	Sam Houston State	2–5–1	1–3–1	T–11th	
1925	Sam Houston State	5–4	1–2	T–8th	
1926	Sam Houston State	5–2–1	4–1	2nd	
1927	Sam Houston State	4–4–1	3–1–1	T–3rd	
1928	Sam Houston State	5–5	3–2	4th	
1929	Sam Houston State	6–3–1	4–1–1	3rd	
1930	Sam Houston State	9–1	5–0	1st	
1931	Sam Houston State	3–6	3–2	3rd (Eastern)	
Sam Houston State Bearkats (Lone Star Conference) (1932–1935)
1932	Sam Houston State	2–5–1	1–4	5th	
1933	Sam Houston State	3–4–2	1–2–2	4th	
1934	Sam Houston State	3–4–2	2–2	T–2nd	
1935	Sam Houston State	3–6	0–4	5th	
Sam Houston State:		54–53–9	31–27–5		
Total:		57–57–11			
National championship Conference title Conference division title or championship game berth
