= 1931 Texas A&M Aggies football team =

American college football season

1931 Texas A&M Aggies football
- Conference: Southwest Conference
- Record: 7–3 (3–2 SWC)
- Head coach: Matty Bell (3rd season)
- Home stadium: Kyle Field

1931 Southwest Conference football standings
	Conf.					Overall
Team	W		L		T	W		L		T
SMU $	5	–	0	–	1	9	–	1	–	1
TCU	4	–	1	–	1	8	–	2	–	1
Texas A&M	3	–	2	–	0	7	–	3	–	0
Rice	3	–	3	–	0	6	–	4	–	0
Texas	2	–	3	–	0	6	–	4	–	0
Baylor	1	–	5	–	0	3	–	6	–	0
Arkansas	0	–	4	–	0	3	–	5	–	1
$ – Conference champion

The 1931 Texas A&M Aggies football team represented the Agricultural and Mechanical College of Texas—now known as Texas A&M University—as a member the Southwest Conference (SWC) during the 1931 college football season. Led by third-year head coach Matty Bell, the Aggies compiled and overall record of 7–3, with a mark of 3–2 in conference play, placing third in the SWC.

== Schedule ==
Date	Opponent	Site	Result	Source
September 26	Southwestern (TX)*	Kyle Field; College Station, TX	W 33–0	
September 26	John Tarleton*	Kyle Field; College Station, TX	W 21–0	
October 3	at Tulane*	Tulane Stadium; New Orleans, LA	L 0–7	
October 10	vs. Iowa*	Fair Park Stadium; Dallas, TX	W 29–0	
October 17	at TCU	Amon G. Carter Stadium; Fort Worth, TX (rivalry)	L 0–6	
October 24	Baylor	Kyle Field; College Station, TX (rivalry)	W 33–7	
October 31	at Centenary*	State Fair Stadium; Shreveport, LA	W 7–0	
November 7	SMU	Kyle Field; College Station, TX	L 0–8	
November 14	at Rice	Rice Field; Houston, TX	W 7–0	
November 26	Texas	Kyle Field; College Station, TX (rivalry)	W 7–6	
*Non-conference game
