= L. William Caine =

American football coach

Biographical details
- Born: May 23, 1892; Iuka, Mississippi, U.S.
- Died: December 24, 1945 (aged 53); Austin, Texas, U.S.

Coaching career (HC unless noted)
- 1919–1920: Grubbs Vocational

Head coaching record
- Overall: 2–7–1

Leonard William Caine Jr. (May 23, 1892 – December 24, 1945) was an American college football coach. He was the first head football at Grubbs Vocational College—now known as the University of Texas at Arlington—serving for two seasons, from 1919 to 1920, and compiling a record of 2–7–1.

Caine died of tuberculosis in 1945.
