= Charles M. Edens =

American football, basketball and baseball coach (1897–1939)

Biographical details
- Born: September 17, 1897; Bertram, Texas, U.S.
- Died: July 29, 1939 (aged 41); Lake Buchanan, near Marble Falls, Texas, U.S.
- Education: Southwestern University (1919)

Coaching career (HC unless noted)

Football
- 1923–1924: North Texas Aggies
- 1925–1938: Southwestern (TX)

Basketball
- 1925–1939: Southwestern (TX)

Baseball
- 1926–1928: Southwestern (TX)

Head coaching record
- Overall: 47–75–15 (college football); 28–23–2 (college baseball); 9–7–2 (junior college football)

Accomplishments and honors

Championships
- Football; 1 TIAA (1925); 1 Texas Conference (1927)

Charles Messerey "Lefty" Edens (September 17, 1897 – July 29, 1939) was an American football, basketball, and baseball coach. He served as the head football coach at North Texas Agricultural College—now the University of Texas at Arlington—from 1923 to 1924 and at Southwestern University in Georgetown, Texas from 1925 to 1938. Edens was also the head basketball coach at Southwestern from 1925 to 1939 and the baseball coach at the school from 1926 to 1928.

Edens died when he drowned during a fishing trip to the Colorado River in July 1939.

== Head coaching record ==
=== College football ===
| Year | Team | Overall | Conference | Standing | Bowl/playoffs |
|---|---|---|---|---|---|
Southwestern Pirates (Texas Intercollegiate Athletic Association) (1925)
| 1925 | Southwestern | 5–3–1 | 4–0–1 | 1st | |
Southwestern Pirates (Texas Conference) (1926–1939)
| 1926 | Southwestern | 0–9 | 0–4 | 5th | |
| 1927 | Southwestern | 4–2–1 | 2–1–1 | 1st | |
| 1928 | Southwestern | 5–4 | 2–3 | T–4th | |
| 1929 | Southwestern | 2–8 | 0–5 | 6th | |
| 1930 | Southwestern | 3–4–4 | 3–1–1 | 2nd | |
| 1931 | Southwestern | 4–6 | 2–3 | 4th | |
| 1932 | Southwestern | 3–3–3 | 3–1 | 2nd | |
| 1933 | Southwestern | 1–8–2 | 1–4–1 | 7th | |
| 1934 | Southwestern | 3–5–2 | 2–4–1 | 7th | |
| 1935 | Southwestern | 1–8–1 | 1–4–1 | T–6th | |
| 1936 | Southwestern | 4–6–1 | 1–4–1 | T–5th | |
| 1937 | Southwestern | 6–5 | 2–4 | | |
| 1938 | Southwestern | 6–4 | 4–2 | T–2nd | |
| Southwestern: | | 47–75–15 | 27–40–7 | | |
| Total: | | 47–75–15 | | | |
National championship Conference title Conference division title or championship game berth

=== Junior college football ===
| Year | Team | Overall | Conference | Standing | Bowl/playoffs |
|---|---|---|---|---|---|
North Texas Aggies () (1923–1924)
| 1923 | North Texas Aggies | 7–2 | | | |
| 1924 | North Texas Aggies | 2–5–2 | | | |
| North Texas Aggies: | | 9–7–2 | | | |
| Total: | | 9–7–2 | | | |
