= C. A. Duval =

American football coach

Coaching career (HC unless noted)
- 1921–1922: Grubbs Vocational

Head coaching record
- Overall: 7–7–2

C. A. Duval was an American college football coach. He was the second head football at Grubbs Vocational College—now known as the University of Texas at Arlington—serving for two seasons, from 1921 to 1922, and compiling a record of 7–7–2.
