= Texas Intercollegiate Athletic Association =

College sport association (1909–1932)

- Founded: May 8, 1909
- Folded: 1932
- No. of teams: 7 (foundation, 1909)
- Region: Texas

The Texas Intercollegiate Athletic Association (TIAA) was a college sports association that operated from 1909 to 1932. All of its members were located in the US state of Texas.

== History ==
Founded in 1909 by Southwestern University, Austin College, Texas Christian University, Texas, Texas A&M, Baylor University and Trinity University the TIAA had a changing set of members that spun off into the Southwest Conference, Lone Star Conference and the Texas Conference. The league had been formed to rid college athletics of objectionable elements like gambling and place them entirely under the control of the schools. At first the league worked well, but soon the disparity in the sizes of the schools became an issue. The large state schools, with bigger stadiums and crowds, began to refuse to travel to the smaller schools and insisted on playing them at home.

This battle between the large and small schools led to the first big change in 1914, when Texas, A&M, Baylor and Southwestern left to form the Southwest Conference, with some considering themselves to be members of both. After two seasons, Southwestern left the Southwest conference and returned to the TIAA. The conferences became completely separate in 1917. In 1922, TIAA expanded by including North Texas. In 1923, TCU left to join the Southwest Conference and in 1924, Rice followed suit.

In 1925, the TIAA was split between members who wanted to allow freshmen and transfers to play and schools that did not. This fault line also separated the teachers colleges that had joined over the years and the church-sponsored schools that had been founders. In May 1925, those that wanted to allow them to play—Trinity, Simmons University (now Hardin–Simmons University), Austin College, Howard Payne, and Southwestern—left to form the Texas Conference, but they agreed to play out the fall 1925 football season within the TIAA. Play within the Texas Conference began with the 1926 basketball season. The five departing schools were all church supported and agreed to ally themselves "along denominational lines."

By 1930, the TIAA had expanded back to 11 members. This included teachers colleges such as Sul Ross, West Texas, East Texas, North Texas, Sam Houston, Stephen F. Austin, and Southwest Texas as well as Abilene Christian College, Daniel Baker, Texas A&I and McMurry. But in May 1931, five TIAA schools joined together to form the Lone Star Conference. These were Sam Houston, Stephen F. Austin, East Texas, Southwest Texas and North Texas. As a result, the conference was dissolved in 1932. Many of the members became independents and eventually wound up in the short-lived Alamo Conference.

== Championships ==
=== Football ===
		Record		
Year	Champion	Conference	Overall	Head coach
1909	Texas A&M	4–0–1	7–0–1	Charley Moran
1910	Texas A&M	5–0	8–1	Charley Moran
1911	Texas	3–0	5–2	Dave Allerdice
1912	Texas A&M	4–0	8–1	Charley Moran
1913	Texas	4–0	7–1	Dave Allerdice
1914	Texas	4–0	8–0	Dave Allerdice
1915	Baylor (vacated)	4–0	7–1	Charles Mosley
1916	Baylor	6–1	9–1	Charles Mosley
1917	Texas A&M	5–0	8–0	Dana X. Bible
1918	Texas	4–0	9–0	William Juneau
1919	Texas A&M	7–0	10–0	Dana X. Bible
1920	TCU	3–0	9–1	William L. Driver
1921	Rice	3–0	4–4–1	Philip Arbuckle
1922	Austin		6–2	Raymond Morehart, Dave Pena, & Charles Robertson
1923	Austin	4–0–1	7–2–1	Pete Cawthon
1924	Howard Payne	5–0	7–2	T. B. Amis
1925	Southwestern (TX)	4–0–1	5–3–1	Charles M. Edens
1926	Daniel Baker	4–0	7–2–1	Shorty Ransom
1927	McMurry	3–0–2	4–1–2	Randolph M. Medley
1928	Daniel Baker	4–0	5–3–2	Herman Clark
1929	Southwest Texas State	4–0–2	6–1–2	Oscar W. Strahan
1930	Sam Houston State	5–0	9–1	J. W. Jones
1931	North Texas State Teachers	4–0 (Eastern Division)	8–3	Jack Sisco
1932	Texas A&I	3–0	6–2	Bud McCallum
