= Texas Longhorns men's track and field =

- Founded: 1895
- University: University of Texas at Austin
- Athletic director: Chris Del Conte
- Head coach: Edrick Floréal (6th season)
- Conference: SEC
- Location: Austin, Texas, US
- Outdoor track: Mike A. Myers Stadium
- Nickname: Longhorns
- Colors: Burnt Orange and White

NCAA Indoor National Championships
- 2022

NCAA Indoor Tournament Appearances
- 1974, 1975, 1976, 1980, 1982, 1985, 1986, 1987, 1988, 1989, 1990, 1991, 1992, 1993, 1994, 1995, 1996, 1997, 1998, 1999, 2000, 2001, 2002, 2003, 2004, 2005, 2006, 2007, 2008, 2009, 2010, 2011, 2012, 2013, 2014, 2015, 2016, 2017, 2018, 2019, 2021, 2022, 2023

NCAA Outdoor Tournament Appearances
- 1927, 1928, 1932, 1934, 1936, 1937, 1938, 1939, 1940, 1941, 1942, 1943, 1945, 1946, 1947, 1948, 1950, 1952, 1953, 1954, 1955, 1956, 1957, 1958, 1959, 1960, 1961, 1962, 1966, 1968, 1969, 1972, 1973, 1974, 1975, 1976, 1977, 1979, 1980, 1981, 1982, 1983, 1984, 1985, 1986, 1987, 1988, 1989, 1990, 1991, 1992, 1993, 1994, 1995, 1996, 1997, 1998, 1999, 2000, 2001, 2002, 2003, 2004, 2005, 2006, 2007, 2008, 2009, 2010, 2011, 2012, 2013, 2014, 2015, 2016, 2017, 2018, 2019, 2021, 2022, 2023

Conference Indoor Championships
- SWC; 1974, 1975, 1992, 1993, 1994 Big 12; 1999, 2006, 2007, 2008, 2009, 2013, 2015, 2017, 2021, 2022

Conference Outdoor Championships
- SWC; 1915, 1916, 1920, 1923, 1924, 1925, 1926, 1927, 1932, 1933, 1934, 1935, 1936, 1937, 1940, 1941, 1942, 1944, 1945, 1946, 1950, 1954, 1955, 1956, 1957, 1958, 1959, 1961, 1966, 1968, 1969, 1972, 1973, 1974, 1975, 1976, 1977, 1979, 1986, 1987, 1992, 1993, 1994, 1995, 1996 Big 12; 1997, 1999, 2003, 2006, 2013, 2015, 2016, 2017, 2021, 2022, 2023

The Texas Longhorns men's track and field team represents the University of Texas at Austin in NCAA Division I intercollegiate men's track and field competition. The Longhorns competed in the Big 12 Conference through the 2024 season and moved to the Southeastern Conference (SEC) on July 1, 2024.

The program is coached by Edrick Floréal. The Longhorns won the NCAA indoor championship in 2022. The Longhorns were runners-up in the outdoor championships in 1987, 1988, and 1997 but have never won the outdoor title. Other notable coaches of the Texas men's program have included Bubba Thornton, who also coached the 2008 US Olympic team, Stan Huntsman (1986–95), who also coached the 1988 US Olympic team, and Clyde Littlefield (Texas coach, 1920–60), the 1925 co-founder of the annual Texas Relays. The men won four consecutive Big 12 Indoor Championships between 2006 and 2009. The men have won 41 individual titles, 10th most of all schools.

The Longhorn track and field programs have produced numerous Olympians for various nations. Male medalists include Ryan Crouser (United States, gold, shot put, 2016, 2020, 2024), Leonel Manzano (United States, silver, 1500 meters, 2012), Winthrop Graham (Jamaica, silver, 400m hurdles, 1992 and 4 × 400 m relay, 1988), Patrick Sang (Kenya, silver, 3000m steeplechase, 1992), Du'aine Ladejo (Great Britain, bronze, 4 × 400 m relay, 1992), Lam Jones (USA, gold, 4 × 100 m relay, 1976), Eddie Southern (USA, silver, 400m hurdles, 1956), and Dean Smith (sprinter) (USA, gold, 4 × 100 m relay, 1952). It has also produced other notable athletes, including Sam Hurley.

== Head coaches ==
#	Coach	Years	Seasons	Conference Championships	
#	Coach	Years	Seasons	Indoor	Outdoor
	no coach	1895–1899	5	0	0
1	F.H. Curtis	1900–1905	6	0	0
2	J.P. Howser	1906–1909	4	0	0
3	C.S. Snyder	1910	1	0	0
4	J. Burton Rix	1911	1	0	0
5	Carl C. Taylor	1912–1914	3	0	0
6	W. E. Metzenthin	1915–1916	2	0	2
7	W.J. Juneau	1918–1920	3	0	1
8	Clyde Littlefield	1921–1961	41	0	25
9	Froggie Lovern	1962–1963	2	0	0
10	Jack Patterson	1964–1970	7	0	3
11	Cleburn Price	1971–1985	15	2	7
12	Stan Huntsman	1986–1995	10	3	6
13	Bubba Thornton	1996–2013	18	6	6
14	Mario Sategna	2014–2017	4	2	3
15	Tonja Buford-Bailey	2018–2018	1	0	0
16	Edrick Floréal	2019–present	6	2	3
Total				SWC: 5 Big 12: 10	SWC: 45; Big 12: 11

== Yearly Record ==
Season	Coach	NCAA		Conference	
Season	Coach	Indoor	Outdoor	Indoor	Outdoor
Independent
1895	no coach				
1896	no coach				
1897	no coach				
1898	no coach				
1899	no coach				
1900	F.H. Curtis				
1901	F.H. Curtis				
1902	F.H. Curtis				
1903	F.H. Curtis				
1904	F.H. Curtis				
1905	F.H. Curtis				
1906	J.P. Howser				
1907	J.P. Howser				
1908	J.P. Howser				
1909	J.P. Howser				
1910	C.S. Snyder				
1911	J. Burton Rix				
1912	Carl C. Taylor				
1913	Carl C. Taylor				
1914	Carl C. Taylor				
Southwest Conference
1915	W. E. Metzenthin				1st
1916	W. E. Metzenthin				1st
1917	no team				
1918	W.J. Juneau				3rd
1919	W.J. Juneau				2nd
1920	W.J. Juneau				1st
1921	Clyde Littlefield				5th
1922	Clyde Littlefield				2nd
1923	Clyde Littlefield				1st
1924	Clyde Littlefield				1st
1925	Clyde Littlefield				1st
1926	Clyde Littlefield				1st
1927	Clyde Littlefield		2nd (14.75)		1st
1928	Clyde Littlefield		T-17th (8)		2nd
1929	Clyde Littlefield				2nd
1930	Clyde Littlefield				2nd
1931	Clyde Littlefield				3rd
1932	Clyde Littlefield		T-24th (6)		1st
1933	Clyde Littlefield				1st
1934	Clyde Littlefield		T-38th (1)		1st
1935	Clyde Littlefield				1st
1936	Clyde Littlefield		11th (12.5)		1st
1937	Clyde Littlefield		T-34th (1.5)		1st
1938	Clyde Littlefield		T-18th (9)		2nd
1939	Clyde Littlefield		8th (13)		2nd
1940	Clyde Littlefield		T-6th (20)		1st
1941	Clyde Littlefield		T-18th (6)		1st
1942	Clyde Littlefield		T-32nd (2)		1st
1943	Clyde Littlefield		T-9th (16)		2nd
1944	Clyde Littlefield				1st
1945	Clyde Littlefield		T-13th (10)		1st
1946	Clyde Littlefield		6th (18)		1st
1947	Clyde Littlefield		13th (11)		2nd
1948	Clyde Littlefield		3rd (35)		2nd
1949	Clyde Littlefield				2nd
1950	Clyde Littlefield		10th (14)		1st
1951	Clyde Littlefield				2nd
1952	Clyde Littlefield		40th (4)		2nd
1953	Clyde Littlefield		30th (4)		2nd
1954	Clyde Littlefield		4th (19)		1st
1955	Clyde Littlefield		15th (11)		1st
1956	Clyde Littlefield		T-29th (6)		1st
1957	Clyde Littlefield		11th (13)		1st
1958	Clyde Littlefield		T-11th (12)		1st
1959	Clyde Littlefield		14th (14)		1st
1960	Clyde Littlefield		T-25th (8)		2nd
1961	Clyde Littlefield		T-40th (2)		1st
1962	Froggie Lovern		45th (2)		2nd
1963	Froggie Lovern				5th
1964	Jack Patterson				2nd
1965	Jack Patterson				6th
1966	Jack Patterson		T-32nd (6)		1st
1967	Jack Patterson				4th
1968	Jack Patterson		T-38th (4)		1st
1969	Jack Patterson		T-25th (6)		1st
1970	Jack Patterson				2nd
1971	Cleburn Price				3rd
1972	Cleburn Price		T-50th (1)		1st
1973	Cleburn Price		T-8th (20)		1st
1974	Cleburn Price	T-38th (3)	14th (15)	1st	1st
1975	Cleburn Price	T-23rd (4)	17th (12)	1st	1st
1976	Cleburn Price	T-14th (6)	T-19th (10)	2nd	1st
1977	Cleburn Price		T-20th (8)	4th	1st
1978	Cleburn Price			6th	6th
1979	Cleburn Price		T-19th (10)	5th	1st
1980	Cleburn Price	T-54th (1)	9th (19)	6th	3rd
1981	Cleburn Price		T-53rd (1)	5th	6th
1982	Cleburn Price	31st (7)	10th (7)	2nd	3rd
1983	Cleburn Price		9th (49)	4th	2nd
1984	Cleburn Price		T-12th (43)	6th	2nd
1985	Cleburn Price	T-34th (4)	T-9th (25)	5th	2nd
1986	Stan Huntsman	T-5th (18)	3rd (47)	3rd	1st
1987	Stan Huntsman	12th (11)	2nd (28)	2nd	1st
1988	Stan Huntsman	T-51st (1)	2nd (41)	4th	2nd
1989	Stan Huntsman	15th (11)	5th (33)	4th	3rd
1990	Stan Huntsman	T-33rd (4)	14th (19.5)	7th	2nd
1991	Stan Huntsman	T-15th (10)	5th (27.5)	3rd	2nd
1992	Stan Huntsman	T-15th (12)	32nd (9)	1st	1st
1993	Stan Huntsman	T-36th (6)	T-36th (7)	1st	1st
1994	Stan Huntsman	T-33rd (6)	T-39th (7)	1st	1st
1995	Stan Huntsman	T-55th (1)	T-13th (19)	3rd	1st
1996	Bubba Thornton	T-14th (41)	5th (27)	2nd	1st
Big 12 Conference
1997	Bubba Thornton	T-15th (13)	2nd (42.5)	4th (80)	1st (130)
1998	Bubba Thornton	T-24th (8)	T-47th (5)	3rd (93)	3rd (93.5)
1999	Bubba Thornton	5th (25)	T-6th (30)	1st (113)	1st (151)
2000	Bubba Thornton	14th (13)	14th (18)	2nd (101)	2nd (127)
2001	Bubba Thornton	T-14th (14)	T-15th (19)	3rd (78.5)	2nd (120.5)
2002	Bubba Thornton	T-23rd (8)	T-9th (23)	2nd (97)	2nd (95.5)
2003	Bubba Thornton	T-9th (18)	T-21st (12)	2nd (131.5)	1st (132)
2004	Bubba Thornton	4th (31)	T-23rd (13)	4th (67)	4th (96)
2005	Bubba Thornton	T-10th (20)	8th (25)	2nd (87.33)	3rd (100.5)
2006	Bubba Thornton	4th (35)	3rd (36)	1st (127)	1st (135)
2007	Bubba Thornton	3rd (34)	14th (17)	T-1st (93)	3rd (96)
2008	Bubba Thornton	3rd (34)	4th (35)	1st (106)	3rd (96)
2009	Bubba Thornton	10th (22.5)	20th (13)	1st (115)	3rd (83.5)
2010	Bubba Thornton	T-60th (1)	T-17th (15)	6th (71)	7th (56)
2011	Bubba Thornton	10th (17)	T-12th (18)	4th (95)	2nd (103.5)
2012	Bubba Thornton	7th (22.5)	T-9th (22)	2nd (133.5)	2nd (131)
2013	Bubba Thornton	T-23rd (9)	6th (32)	1st (135)	1st (146.5)
2014	Mario Sategna	T-20th (11)	11th (19.5)	2nd (108.5)	2nd (125)
2015	Mario Sategna	6th (25)	7th (26)	1st (140)	1st (151)
2016	Mario Sategna	5th (25)	36th (6)	2nd (128.5)	1st (134)
2017	Mario Sategna	9th (21)	T-26th (10)	1st (123.5)	1st (153.5)
2018	Tonja Buford-Bailey	12th (17)	25th (12)	2nd (129)	2nd (117)
2019	Edrick Floréal	T-13th (16)	9th (26)	5th (69.5)	3rd (120.5)
2020	Edrick Floréal	—	—	3rd (118)	—
2021	Edrick Floréal	T-14th (12)	T-6th (29)	1st (141)	1st (173)
2022	Edrick Floréal	1st (47)	2nd (38)	1st (171)	1st (161)
2023	Edrick Floréal	19th (13)	12th (20)	3rd (105)	1st (134)
Southeastern Conference
2024	Edrick Floréal				
Total		1	0	SWC: 5 Big 12: 10	SWC: 45; Big 12: 11

Note: The 2020 season was canceled after the Big 12 Indoor Championships due to the Coronavirus Pandemic, the Big 12 Outdoor and NCAA Championships were not held.

== NCAA Individual Event Champions ==
Indoor
Year	Name	Event	Time/Mark
1986	James Lott	High Jump	7' 5"
1987	James Lott	High Jump	7' 6"
1999	Jacob Davis	Pole Vault	19' 2.25"
1999	Mark Boswell	High Jump	7' 7"
2000	Mark Boswell	High Jump	7' 7.75"
2004	Donovan Kilmartin	Heptathlon	6,136
2004	Andra Manson	High Jump	7' 3.25"
2006	Donovan Kilmartin	Heptathlon	6,048
2007	Donovan Kilmartin	Heptathlon	5,998
2007	Leo Manzano	Mile	3:59.90
2008	Leo Manzano	Mile	4:04.45
2008	Tevan Everett	Distance Medley	9:32.04
2008	Danzell Fortson	Distance Medley	9:32.04
2008	Jacob Hernandez	Distance Medley	9:32.04
2008	Leo Manzano	Distance Medley	9:32.04
2009	Jacob Hernandez	800 Meters	1:48.04
2014	Ryan Crouser	Shot Put	69' 7"
2016	Zack Bilderback	400m	46.03
2016	Ryan Crouser	Shot Put	69' 9.75"
2018	O'Brien Wasome	Triple Jump	55' 2.25"
2022	Cruz Gomez	Distance Medley	9:25.20
2022	Willington Wright	Distance Medley	9:25.20
2022	Crayton Carrozza	Distance Medley	9:25.20
2022	Yaseen Abdalla	Distance Medley	9:25.20
2023	Yusuf Bizimana	800 Meters	1:46.02

Outdoor
Year	Name	Event	Time/Mark
1925	Jim Reese	Mile	4:18.8
1926	Rufus Haggard	High Jump	6' 7.25"
1927	Garland Sheperd	High Jump	6' 5.5"
1939	Jud Atchison	Long Jump	24' 9.25"
1943	Jerry Thompson	Two Miles	9:29.9
1945	Earl Collins	220 Yards	22.4
1946	John Robertson	Long Jump	24' 10.5"
1947	Jerry Thompson	Two Miles	9:22.9
1948	Jerry Thompson	5,000 Meters	15:04.5
1950	Charley Parker	220 Yards	21.5
1954	Charlie Thomas	220 Yards	20.7
1959	Eddie Southern	440 Yards	46.4
1973	Robert Primeaux	440-Yard Hurdles	49.5
1975	Jim McGoldrick	Discus	190' 1"
1976	Dana LeDuc	Shot Put	65' 5.5"
1983	Einar Vilhjálmsson	Javelin	293' 1"
1984	Einar Vilhjálmsson	Javelin	294'
1986	Dag Wennlund	Javelin	259' 9"
1986	Eric Metcalf	Long Jump	27' .5"
1986	James Lott	High Jump	7' 3"
1987	Dag Wennlund	Javelin	252' 10.25"
1988	Eric Metcalf	Long Jump	27' 2"
1989	Winthrop Graham	400-Meter Hurdles	48.55
1989	Patrik Bodén	Javelin	255' 4"
1990	Patrik Bodén	Javelin	261' 10"
1991	Patrik Bodén	Javelin	260' 4"
1996	Richard Duncan	Long Jump	26' .25"
1997	Ivan Wagner	High Jump	7' 6.50"
1999	Jacob Davis	Pole Vault	18' 2.75"
1999	Mark Boswell	High Jump	7' 7.75"
2000	Mark Boswell	High Jump	7' 7.7"
2002	Brian Hunter	Pole Vault	18' 8.25"
2004	Andra Manson	High Jump	7' 7.25"
2005	Trey Hardee	Decathlon	7,881
2005	Leo Manzano	1,500 Meters	3:37.13
2008	Jacob Hernandez	800 Meters	1:45.31
2008	Leo Manzano	1,500 Meters	3:41.25
2008	Maston Wallace	Pole Vault	17' 6.5"
2010	Marquise Goodwin	Long Jump	26' 9"
2012	Marquise Goodwin	Long Jump	27'
2013	Ryan Crouser	Shot Put	66' 7.75"
2013	Johannes Hock	Decathlon	8,267
2014	Ryan Crouser	Shot Put	69' 3.5"
2019	Tripp Piperi	Shot Put	69' 3.25"
2022	Tripp Piperi	Shot Put	70' 7.25"
2023	Leo Neugebauer	Decathlon	8,836

== Conference Individual Event Champions ==
Source
As of Dec 3, 2024

Indoor
Event	Titles
60 Yards	1
60 Meters	5
55-Meter hurdles	1
60-Yard Hurdles	3
60-Meter Hurdles	9
200 Meters	4
400 Meters	6
440 yards	1
600 Yards	7
800 Meters	6
1,000 Yards	5
1,000 Meters	5
Mile	13
Two-Mile	1
3,000 Meters	3
5,000 Meters	7
4x400 Meter Relay	4
Mile Relay	2
Two-Mile Relay	2
Distance Medley Relay	7
High Jump	12
Pole Vault	12
Long Jump	8
Triple Jump	6
Shot Put	14
Heptathlon	10

Outdoor
Event	Titles
100 Yards	24
100 Meters	5
220 Yards	28
200 Meters	5
440 Yards	13
400 Meters	2
880 Yards	25
800 Meters	7
Mile	26
Three Miles	5
1,500 Meters	7
5,000 Meters	3
10,000 Meters	6
Steeplechase	15
120-Yard Hurdles	13
110-Meter Hurdles	5
440-Yard Hurdles	3
400-Meter Hurdles	10
4x100-Meter Relay	5
4x400-Meter Relay	1
440-Yard Relay	23
Mile Relay	31
High Jump	36
Pole Vault	33
Long Jump	28
Triple Jump	7
Shot Put	27
Discus	19
Javelin	28
Hammer Throw	2
Heptathlon	2
Decathlon	12

== See also ==
- Texas Longhorns women's track and field
- Texas Longhorns men's cross country
- Texas Longhorns women's cross country
