= Bubba Thornton =

American football player and sports coach (born 1947)

Biographical details
- Born: March 9, 1947 (age 79); Fort Worth, Texas, U.S.
- Education: Texas Christian University

Playing career

Track & Field
- 1967–1969: TCU

Football
- 1967–1969: TCU
- 1969: Buffalo Bills
- Position: Wide receiver

Coaching career (HC unless noted)
- 1982–1995: TCU
- 1996–2013: Texas

Accomplishments and honors

Championships
- Southwest Conference Outdoor (1996); 6× Big 12 Indoor (1999, 2006, 2007, 2008, 2009, 2013); 5× Big 12 Outdoor (1997, 1999, 2003, 2006, 2013)

Awards
- 5× Big 12 Coach of the Year – Indoor (1999, 2006, 2008, 2009, 2013); 5× Big 12 Coach of the Year – Outdoor (1997, 1999, 2003, 2006, 2013); 2× USTFCCCA South Central Region Indoor Coach of the Year (2006, 2007); USTFCCCA South Central Region Outdoor Coach of the Year (2006); NCAA District VI Coach of the Year (1999); 34 NCAA Individual (27) and Relay (7) Championships; Texas Track and Field Coaches Hall of Fame (2015)

Bubba Thornton (born March 9, 1947) is an American retired track and field coach. He coached Texas Christian University (TCU) from 1982 to 1995 and served as the Texas Longhorns men's track and field coach at the University of Texas at Austin from 1996 to 2013. He is also the former head coach for the USA Track & Field team, whom he coached for the 2008 Beijing Summer Olympics.

== College career ==
Thornton graduated from TCU in 1969 with a bachelor's degree in physical education. He participated in varsity football and track and field.

== Professional career ==
After graduating, he was drafted by the Buffalo Bills in the 14th round of the 1969 American Football League draft and started as a rookie wide receiver.

=== AFL career statistics ===
| Year | Team | Games | | Receiving | | | | | Rushing | | | | |
| Year | Team | GP | GS | Rec | Yds | Avg | Lng | TD | Att | Yds | Avg | Lng | TD |
|---|---|---|---|---|---|---|---|---|---|---|---|---|---|
| 1969 | BUF | 14 | 6 | 14 | 134 | 9.6 | 21 | 0 | 0 | 0 | 0.0 | 0 | 0 |
| Career | | 14 | 6 | 14 | 134 | 9.6 | 21 | 0 | 0 | 0 | 0.0 | 0 | 0 |

== Coaching career ==
He began his coaching career at Keller High School where he served as the athletics director and head football coach from 1977 to 1981.

In 1982, he became head coach of track and field at TCU where he coached 72 NCAA All-Americans and his men's team had five NCAA Top 10 finishes (1983, '87, '88, '89 and '91) and 11 Top 20 finishes. He also coached the TCU team to 39 major relay titles, including five NCAA 400-meter relay championships (1986, '87, '89, '91 and '95) and the 1983 1,600-meter relay national title.

In 1996, Thornton was hired as the head coach for the men's track and field team at Texas. In 17 seasons, his team finished in the top 15 at the NCAA Outdoor Championships 13 times, including finishing in the top five four times. He coached the UT team to 19 top 10 NCAA finishes and 11 Big 12 conference titles (six indoor, five outdoor) and 1 Southwest Conference outdoor title.

Thornton also served as a coach in the following capacities:

- Head coach USA, Men's Track and Field Team, USA Track & Field – 2008 Beijing Summer Olympic Games
- Head coach USA, World Outdoor Men's Track and Field, USA Track & Field – 2003 World Championships in Athletics
- Assistant coach USA, Men's Track and Field Team, USA Track & Field – 2000 Sydney Summer Olympics
- Head coach USA – 1996 World Junior Championships in Athletics

Thornton retired in 2013. He was inducted into the Texas Track and Field Coaches Hall of Fame, Class of 2015.

| School | Season | Indoor | Outdoor |
|---|---|---|---|
| UT | 2013 | T-23rd | 6th |
| UT | 2012 | 7th | T-9th |
| UT | 2011 | 10th | T-12th |
| UT | 2010 | T-60th | T-17th |
| UT | 2009 | 10th | 20th |
| UT | 2008 | 3rd | 4th |
| UT | 2007 | 3rd | 14th |
| UT | 2006 | 4th | 3rd |
| UT | 2005 | 70th | 8th |
| UT | 2004 | 4th | T-23rd |
| UT | 2003 | T-9th | T-21st |
| UT | 2002 | T-23rd | T-9th |
| UT | 2001 | T-14th | T-15th |
| UT | 2000 | 14th | 14th |
| UT | 1999 | 5th | T-6th |
| UT | 1998 | T-24th | T-47th |
| UT | 1997 | T-15th | 2nd |
| UT | 1996 | T-14th | 5th |
| TCU | 1995 | | 12th |
| TCU | 1994 | | 29th |
| TCU | 1993 | | T-34th |
| TCU | 1992 | | 22nd |
| TCU | 1991 | | 9th |
| TCU | 1989 | | 20th |
| TCU | 1988 | | 8th |
| TCU | 1987 | | 8th |
| TCU | 1986 | | 3rd |
| TCU | 1985 | | 12th |
| TCU | 1984 | | 15th |
| TCU | 1983 | | 10th |

== Post-playing honors ==
Thornton was inducted into the Navarro Bulldogs Hall of Fame. He was also inducted into the Texas Sports Hall of Fame. Thornton was additionally inducted into the U.S. Track & Field and Cross Country Coaches Association (USTFCCCA) Coaches Hall of Fame in Orlando, Florida.

== See also ==
- Texas Longhorns Track and Field
- 2008 Summer Olympics
- TCU Horned Frogs
- Buffalo Bills Players
- 1969 NFL/AFL draft
- List of American Football League players
