= 1932 Rice Owls football team =

American college football season

1932 Rice Owls football
- Conference: Southwest Conference
- Record: 7–3 (3–3 SWC)
- Head coach: Jack Meagher (4th season)
- Home stadium: Rice Field

1932 Southwest Conference football standings
	Conf.					Overall
Team	W		L		T	W		L		T
No. 10 TCU $	6	–	0	–	0	10	–	0	–	1
Texas	5	–	1	–	0	8	–	2	–	0
Rice	3	–	3	–	0	7	–	3	–	0
Texas A&M	1	–	2	–	2	4	–	4	–	2
Baylor	1	–	4	–	1	3	–	5	–	1
SMU	1	–	4	–	1	3	–	7	–	2
Arkansas	1	–	4	–	0	1	–	6	–	2
$ – Conference champion; Rankings from Dickinson System

The 1932 Rice Owls football team was an American football team that represented Rice Institute as a member of the Southwest Conference (SWC) during the 1932 college football season. In its fourth season under head coach Jack Meagher, the team compiled a 7–3 record (3–3 against SWC opponents) and was outscored by a total of 141 to 77.

== Schedule ==
Date	Opponent	Site	Result	Attendance	Source
September 24	Texas A&I*	Rice Field; Houston, TX	W 20–0		
October 1	LSU*	Rice Field; Houston, TX	W 10–8		
October 8	at SMU	Ownby Stadium; University Park, TX (rivalry)	W 13–0		
October 15	Loyola (LA)*	Rice Field; Houston, TX	W 14–7		
October 22	Texas	Rice Field; Houston, TX (rivalry)	L 6–18	15,000	
October 29	Creighton*	Rice Field; Houston, TX	W 41–7		
November 5	at Arkansas	The Hill; Fayetteville, AR	W 12–7		
November 11	at Texas A&M	Kyle Field; College Station, TX	L 7–14		
November 19	TCU	Rice Field; Houston, TX	L 6–16		
November 26	Baylor	Rice Field; Houston, TX	W 12–0		
*Non-conference game
