= 1932 Sam Houston State Bearkats football team =

American college football season

1932 Sam Houston State Bearkats football
- Conference: Lone Star Conference
- Record: 2–6–1 (1–4 LSC)
- Head coach: J. W. Jones (10th season)
- Home stadium: Pritchett Field

1932 Lone Star Conference football standings
	Conf.					Overall
Team	W		L		T	W		L		T
North Texas State $	5	–	0	–	0	8	–	1	–	1
Southwest Texas State	3	–	1	–	0	5	–	3	–	0
Trinity (TX)	2	–	1	–	1	5	–	2	–	1
East Texas State	2	–	2	–	1	3	–	4	–	1
Sam Houston State	1	–	4	–	0	2	–	6	–	1
Stephen F. Austin	0	–	5	–	0	2	–	7	–	0
$ – Conference champion

The 1932 Sam Houston State Bearkats football team represented Sam Houston State Teachers College (now known as Sam Houston State University) as a member of the Lone Star Conference (LSC) during the 1932 college football season. Led by 10th-year head coach J. W. Jones, the Bearkats compiled an overall record of 2–6–1 with a mark of 1–4 in conference play, and finished fifth in the LSC.

== Schedule ==
Date	Opponent	Site	Result	Source
September 23	Blinn*	Pritchett Field; Huntsville, TX	W 26–0	
September 30	Southwestern (TX)*	Pritchett Field; Huntsville, TX	T 0–0	
October 5	Texas A&M*	Pritchett Field; Huntsville, TX	L 0–26	
October 14	at Trinity (TX)	Yoakum Field; Waxahachie, TX	L 6–20	
October 21	at East Texas State	Commerce, TX	L 7–13	
October 29	at Texas A&I*	Kingsville, TX	L 6–12	
November 4	North Texas State	Pritchett Field; Huntsville, TX	L 6–7	
November 11	Southwest Texas State	Pritchett Field; Huntsville, TX (rivalry)	L 0–6	
November 18	Stephen F. Austin	Pritchett Field; Huntsville, TX (rivalry)	W 14–0	
*Non-conference game
