= 1932 SMU Mustangs football team =

American college football season

1932 SMU Mustangs football
- Conference: Southwest Conference
- Record: 3–7–2 (1–4–1 SWC)
- Head coach: Ray Morrison (13th season)
- Captain: Howard Sprague
- Home stadium: Ownby Stadium, Fair Park Stadium

1932 Southwest Conference football standings
	Conf.					Overall
Team	W		L		T	W		L		T
No. 10 TCU $	6	–	0	–	0	10	–	0	–	1
Texas	5	–	1	–	0	8	–	2	–	0
Rice	3	–	3	–	0	7	–	3	–	0
Texas A&M	1	–	2	–	2	4	–	4	–	2
Baylor	1	–	4	–	1	3	–	5	–	1
SMU	1	–	4	–	1	3	–	7	–	2
Arkansas	1	–	4	–	0	1	–	6	–	2
$ – Conference champion; Rankings from Dickinson System

The 1932 SMU Mustangs football team represented Southern Methodist University (SMU) as a member of the Southwest Conference (SWC) during the 1932 college football season. Led by 13th-year head coach Ray Morrison, the Mustangs compiled an overall record of 3–7–2 with a mark of 1–4–1 in conference play, tying for fifth place in the SWC.

== Schedule ==
Date	Opponent	Site	Result	Attendance	Source
September 24	North Texas State Teachers*	Ownby Stadium; University Park, TX (rivalry)	T 0–0		
October 1	at Texas Tech*	Tech Field; Lubbock, TX	L 0–6		
October 8	Rice	Ownby Stadium; University Park, TX (rivalry)	L 0–13		
October 15	at Syracuse*	Archbold Stadium; Syracuse, NY	W 16–6	15,000	
October 22	Centenary*	Fair Park Stadium; Dallas, TX	L 7–18		
October 29	at Texas	War Memorial Stadium; Austin, TX	L 6–14	20,000	
November 5	Texas A&M	Ownby Stadium; University Park, TX	T 0–0		
November 12	Arkansas	Ownby Stadium; University Park, TX	W 13–7		
November 19	at Baylor	Carroll Field; Waco, TX	L 0–19		
November 26	TCU	Ownby Stadium; University Park, TX (rivalry)	L 0–8		
December 3	Nebraska*	Ownby Stadium; University Park, TX	L 14–21	2,500	
January 2	at Texas Mines*	El Paso High School Stadium; El Paso, TX	W 26–0	5,000	
*Non-conference game
