= 1932 Texas Longhorns football team =

American college football season

1932 Texas Longhorns football
- Conference: Southwest Conference
- Record: 8–2 (5–1 SWC)
- Head coach: Clyde Littlefield (6th season)
- Captains: Wilson Cook; Ernie Koy
- Home stadium: War Memorial Stadium

1932 Southwest Conference football standings
	Conf.					Overall
Team	W		L		T	W		L		T
No. 10 TCU $	6	–	0	–	0	10	–	0	–	1
Texas	5	–	1	–	0	8	–	2	–	0
Rice	3	–	3	–	0	7	–	3	–	0
Texas A&M	1	–	2	–	2	4	–	4	–	2
Baylor	1	–	4	–	1	3	–	5	–	1
SMU	1	–	4	–	1	3	–	7	–	2
Arkansas	1	–	4	–	0	1	–	6	–	2
$ – Conference champion; Rankings from Dickinson System

The 1932 Texas Longhorns football team was an American football team that represented the University of Texas (now known as the University of Texas at Austin) as a member of the Southwest Conference (SWC) during the 1932 college football season. In their sixth year under head coach Clyde Littlefield, the Longhorns compiled an overall record of 8–2, with a mark of 5–1 in conference play, and finished second in the SWC.

== Schedule ==
Date	Opponent	Site	Result	Attendance	Source
September 24	Daniel Baker*	War Memorial Stadium; Austin, TX	W 26–0		
October 1	Centenary*	War Memorial Stadium; Austin, TX	L 6–13		
October 8	at Missouri*	Memorial Stadium; Columbia, MO	W 65–0		
October 15	vs. Oklahoma*	Fair Park Stadium; Dallas, TX (rivalry)	W 17–10		
October 22	at Rice	Rice Field; Houston, TX (rivalry)	W 18–6	15,000	
October 29	SMU	War Memorial Stadium; Austin, TX	W 14–6	20,000	
November 5	at Baylor	Carroll Field; Waco, TX (rivalry)	W 19–0		
November 11	at TCU	Amon G. Carter Stadium; Fort Worth, TX (rivalry)	L 0–14		
November 18	at Arkansas	The Hill; Fayetteville, AR (rivalry)	W 34–0	2,000	
November 24	Texas A&M	War Memorial Stadium; Austin, TX (rivalry)	W 21–0	30,000	
*Non-conference game
