= Clyde Littlefield =

American sports coach

Biographical details
- Born: October 6, 1892; Oil City, Pennsylvania, U.S.
- Died: May 20, 1981 (aged 88); Austin, Texas, U.S.

Playing career

Football
- 1912–1915: Texas

Coaching career (HC unless noted)

Football
- 1920–1926: Texas (assistant)
- 1927–1933: Texas
- 1936–1942: Texas (assistant)
- 1945–1948: Texas (assistant)

Track
- 1920–1961: Texas

Head coaching record
- Overall: 44–18–6 (football)

Accomplishments and honors

Championships
- Football; 2 SWC (1928, 1930); Track & Field; 25 SWC (1923–1927, 1932–1937, 1940, 1941, 1942, 1944, 1945, 1946, 1950, 1954–1959, 1961)

Clyde Littlefield (October 6, 1892 – May 20, 1981) was an American sports and athletics coach. The head track and field coach at The University of Texas from 1920 to 1961 as well as its football coach from 1927 to 1933. In his 41 years at Texas, his athletic teams won 25 Southwest Conference championships and in football the Longhorns had a 44–18–6 record and won two Southwest Conference championships. He was also on the US coaching staff at the 1952 Summer Olympics in Helsinki.

== Early life and education ==
Littlefield was born in Oil City, Pennsylvania, and raised in Sistersville, West Virginia, and Southeast Texas, where he graduated from South Park High School in Beaumont. He then attended Peacock Military Academy in San Antonio and Marshall Training School, and from 1912 to 1916 was a student at the University of Texas, where he earned twelve letters, in football, basketball, and track.

== Coaching career ==
Littlefield was head football coach at Greenville High School in Greenville for four years, and then in 1920 returned to the University of Texas as head track coach, freshman football coach, freshman basketball coach, and instructor in physical training. He remained there until 1961, winning 25 Southwest conference championships in track, and also serving as head football coach from 1927 to 1933, during which time the university won two Southwest Conference championships. He served as an instructor of an officers' training corps during World War I and was on the United States track and field coaching staff at the 1952 Helsinki Olympics.

He served for many years on the NCAA track and field rules committee and was president of the NCAA Track Coaches Association.

== Honors ==
Littlefield was awarded the Amos Alonzo Stagg Award and was inducted into the Longhorn Hall of Honor at the University of Texas, the Helms Foundation Hall of Fame, the Texas Sports Hall of Fame, and the National Track and Field Hall of Fame. The University of Texas has a plaque in his honor and named a graduate fellowship for him in 1963.

The Texas Relays, which he co-founded in 1925, were named the Clyde Littlefield Texas Relays in his honor.

== Private life and death ==
Littlefield married Henrietta Rabb in 1920; they had a son. He was a Freemason and Shriner. Littlefield died on May 20, 1981, at his home in Austin, Texas.

== Head coaching record ==
=== Football ===
Year	Team	Overall	Conference	Standing	Bowl/playoffs
Texas Longhorns (Southwest Conference) (1927–1933)
1927	Texas	6–2–1	2–2–1	4th	
1928	Texas	7–2	5–1	1st	
1929	Texas	5–2–2	2–2–2	T–4th	
1930	Texas	8–1–1	4–1	1st	
1931	Texas	6–4	2–3	5th	
1932	Texas	8–2	5–1	2nd	
1933	Texas	4–5–2	2–3–1	5th	
Texas:		44–18–6	22–13–4		
Total:		44–18–6			
National championship Conference title Conference division title or championship game berth
