= 1932 Arkansas Razorbacks football team =

American college football season

1932 Arkansas Razorbacks football
- Conference: Southwest Conference
- Record: 1–6–2 (1–4 SWC)
- Head coach: Fred Thomsen (4th season)
- Captain: Judson Irwin
- Home stadium: The Hill, Quigley Stadium

1932 Southwest Conference football standings
| | Conf. | | | | | Overall |
| Team | W | | L | | T | W | | L | | T |
|---|---|---|---|---|---|---|---|---|---|---|
| No. 10 TCU $ | 6 | – | 0 | – | 0 | 10 | – | 0 | – | 1 |
| Texas | 5 | – | 1 | – | 0 | 8 | – | 2 | – | 0 |
| Rice | 3 | – | 3 | – | 0 | 7 | – | 3 | – | 0 |
| Texas A&M | 1 | – | 2 | – | 2 | 4 | – | 4 | – | 2 |
| Baylor | 1 | – | 4 | – | 1 | 3 | – | 5 | – | 1 |
| SMU | 1 | – | 4 | – | 1 | 3 | – | 7 | – | 2 |
| Arkansas | 1 | – | 4 | – | 0 | 1 | – | 6 | – | 2 |
$ – Conference champion; Rankings from Dickinson System

The 1932 Arkansas Razorbacks football team represented the University of Arkansas in the Southwest Conference (SWC) during the 1932 college football season. In their fourth year under head coach Fred Thomsen, the Razorbacks compiled a 1–6–2 record (1–4 against SWC opponents), finished in last place in the SWC, and were outscored by their opponents by a combined total of 133 to 65.

== Schedule ==
| Date | Opponent | Site | Result | Attendance | Source |
|---|---|---|---|---|---|
| September 24 | Hendrix* | The Hill; Fayetteville, AR | T 0–0 | | |
| October 1 | Missouri Mines* | The Hill; Fayetteville, AR | L 19–20 | | |
| October 8 | at TCU | Amon G. Carter Stadium; Fort Worth, TX | L 12–34 | | |
| October 15 | Baylor | Quigley Stadium; Little Rock, AR | W 20–6 | | |
| October 22 | vs. LSU* | State Fair Stadium; Shreveport, LA (rivalry) | L 0–14 | | |
| November 5 | Rice^{†} | The Hill; Fayetteville, AR | L 7–12 | | |
| November 12 | at SMU | Ownby Stadium; University Park, TX | L 7–13 | | |
| November 18 | Texas | The Hill; Fayetteville, AR (rivalry) | L 0–34 | 2,000 | |
| November 24 | at Centenary* | Centenary Stadium; Shreveport, LA | T 0–0 | | |
*Non-conference game; ^{†}Homecoming
