= 1932 Texas A&M Aggies football team =

American college football season

1932 Texas A&M Aggies football
- Conference: Southwest Conference
- Record: 4–4–2 (1–2–2 SWC)
- Head coach: Matty Bell (4th season)
- Home stadium: Kyle Field

1932 Southwest Conference football standings
	Conf.					Overall
Team	W		L		T	W		L		T
No. 10 TCU $	6	–	0	–	0	10	–	0	–	1
Texas	5	–	1	–	0	8	–	2	–	0
Rice	3	–	3	–	0	7	–	3	–	0
Texas A&M	1	–	2	–	2	4	–	4	–	2
Baylor	1	–	4	–	1	3	–	5	–	1
SMU	1	–	4	–	1	3	–	7	–	2
Arkansas	1	–	4	–	0	1	–	6	–	2
$ – Conference champion; Rankings from Dickinson System

The 1932 Texas A&M Aggies football team represented the Agricultural and Mechanical College of Texas—now known as Texas A&M University—in the Southwest Conference (SWC) during the 1932 college football season. In its fourth season under head coach Matty Bell, the team compiled an overall record of 4–4–2, with a mark of 1–2–2 in conference play, and finished fourth in the SWC.

== Schedule ==
Date	Opponent	Site	Result	Attendance	Source
September 24	vs. Texas Tech*	Butler Field; Amarillo, TX (rivalry)	W 7–0	5,000	
October 1	at Tulane*	Tulane Stadium; New Orleans, LA	L 14–26		
October 5	at Sam Houston State*	Pritchett Field; Huntsville, TX	W 26–0		
October 8	Texas A&I*	Kyle Field; College Station, TX	W 14–0		
October 15	TCU	Kyle Field; College Station, TX (rivalry)	L 0–17		
October 22	at Baylor	Carroll Field; Waco, TX (rivalry)	T 0–0		
October 29	at Centenary*	State Fair Stadium; Shreveport, LA	L 0–7		
November 5	at SMU	Ownby Stadium; University Park, TX	T 0–0		
November 11	Rice	Kyle Field; College Station, TX	W 14–7		
November 24	at Texas	War Memorial Stadium; Austin, TX (rivalry)	L 0–21	30,000	
*Non-conference game
