= 1932 Texas A&I Javelinas football team =

American college football season

1932 Texas A&I Javelinas football

TIAA champion
- Conference: Texas Intercollegiate Athletic Association
- Record: 6–2 (3–0 TIAA)
- Head coach: Bud McCallum (4th season)
- Captains: Albert Cox; W. L. Harbin
- Home stadium: Hog Field

1932 Texas Intercollegiate Athletic Association football standings
	Conf.					Overall
Team	W		L		T	W		L		T
Texas A&I $	3	–	0	–	0	6	–	2	–	0
West Texas State	3	–	0	–	1	4	–	2	–	2
Sul Ross	3	–	0	–	1	?	–	?	–	?
McMurry	2	–	3	–	0	2	–	4	–	2
Abilene Christian	1	–	4	–	0	2	–	6	–	1
Daniel Baker	0	–	5	–	0	2	–	7	–	1
$ – Conference champion

The 1932 Texas A&I Javelinas football team represented Texas College of Arts and Industries—now known as Texas A&M University–Kingsville–as a member of the Texas Intercollegiate Athletic Association (TIAA) during the 1932 college football season. Led by fourth-year head coach Bud McCallum, the Javelinas compiled an overall record of 6–2 with a mark of 3–0 in conference play, winning the TIAA title. Albert Cox and W. L. Harbin were the team captains.

== Schedule ==
Date	Time	Opponent	Site	Result	Source
September 24		at Rice*	Rice Field; Houston, TX	L 0–20	
October 8		at Texas A&M*	Kyle Field; College Station, TX	L 0–14	
October 22		Kelly Field*	Kingsville, TX	W 44–0	
October 29		Sam Houston State*^{†}	Kingsville, TX	W 12–6	
November 5		at Daniel Baker	Brownwood, TX	W 19–13	
November 11	3:00 p.m.	Abilene Christian	Hog Field; Kingsville, TX	W 25–0	
November 18		Schreiner*	Kingsville, TX	W 13–0	
November 26	8:00 p.m.	vs. McMurry	Clark Field; Corpus Christi, TX	W 20–0	
*Non-conference game; ^{†}Homecoming; All times are in Central time
