= 1932 Southwest Texas State Bobcats football team =

American college football season

1932 Southwest Texas State Bobcats football
- Conference: Lone Star Conference
- Record: 5–3 (3–1 LSC)
- Head coach: Oscar W. Strahan (14th season)
- Home stadium: Evans Field

1932 Lone Star Conference football standings
| | Conf. | | | | | Overall |
| Team | W | | L | | T | W | | L | | T |
|---|---|---|---|---|---|---|---|---|---|---|
| North Texas State $ | 5 | – | 0 | – | 0 | 8 | – | 1 | – | 1 |
| Southwest Texas State | 3 | – | 1 | – | 0 | 5 | – | 3 | – | 0 |
| Trinity (TX) | 2 | – | 1 | – | 1 | 5 | – | 2 | – | 1 |
| East Texas State | 2 | – | 2 | – | 1 | 3 | – | 4 | – | 1 |
| Sam Houston State | 1 | – | 4 | – | 0 | 2 | – | 6 | – | 1 |
| Stephen F. Austin | 0 | – | 5 | – | 0 | 2 | – | 7 | – | 0 |
$ – Conference champion

The 1932 Southwest Texas State Bobcats football team was an American football team that represented Southwest Texas State Teachers College (now known as Texas State University) during the 1932 college football season as a member of the Lone Star Conference (LSC). In their 14th year under head coach Oscar W. Strahan, the team compiled an overall record of 5–3 with a mark of 3–1 in conference play.

== Schedule ==
| Date | Opponent | Site | Result | Source |
|---|---|---|---|---|
| September 30 | Howard Payne* | Evans Field; San Marcos, TX | L 6–14 | |
| October 7 | at Schreiner* | Kerrville, TX | W 20–0 | |
| October 11 | at Stephen F. Austin | Nacogdoches, TX | W 25–6 | |
| October 21 | Southwestern (TX)* | Evans Field; San Marcos, TX | W 12–0 | |
| October 28 | East Texas State | Evans Field; San Marcos, TX | W 6–0 | |
| November 4 | St. Edward's* | Evans Field; San Marcos, TX | L 7–13 | |
| November 11 | at Sam Houston State | Pritchett Field; Huntsville, TX (rivalry) | W 6–0 | |
| November 22 | at North Texas State Teachers | Eagle Field; Denton, TX | L 0–6 | |
*Non-conference game
