= 1932 North Texas State Teachers Eagles football team =

American college football season

1932 North Texas State Teachers Eagles football

LSC champion
- Conference: Lone Star Conference
- Record: 8–1–1 (5–0 LSC)
- Head coach: Jack Sisco (4th season)
- Home stadium: Eagle Field

1932 Lone Star Conference football standings
	Conf.					Overall
Team	W		L		T	W		L		T
North Texas State $	5	–	0	–	0	8	–	1	–	1
Southwest Texas State	3	–	1	–	0	5	–	3	–	0
Trinity (TX)	2	–	1	–	1	5	–	2	–	1
East Texas State	2	–	2	–	1	3	–	4	–	1
Sam Houston State	1	–	4	–	0	2	–	6	–	1
Stephen F. Austin	0	–	5	–	0	2	–	7	–	0
$ – Conference champion

The 1932 North Texas State Teachers Eagles football team was an American football team that represented the North Texas State Teachers College (now known as the University of North Texas) during the 1932 college football season as a member of the Lone Star Conference. In their fourth year under head coach Jack Sisco, the team compiled a 8–1–1 record.

== Schedule ==
Date	Opponent	Site	Result	Source
September 17	at TCU*	Amon G. Carter Stadium; Fort Worth, TX	L 2–14	
September 24	at SMU*	Ownby Stadium; University Park, TX (rivalry)	T 0–0	
October 1	Austin*	Eagle Field; Denton, TX	W 54–0	
October 7	at Southwestern (TX)*	Georgetown, TX	W 20–0	
October 14	Abilene Christian*	Eagle Field; Denton, TX	W 14–0	
October 28	Stephen F. Austin	Eagle Field; Denton, TX	W 31–0	
November 4	at Sam Houston State	Pritchett Field; Huntsville, TX	W 7–6	
November 11	at East Texas State	Lion Stadium; Commerce, TX	W 27–6	
November 17	Trinity (TX)	Eagle Field; Denton, TX	W 20–0	
November 22	Southwest Texas State	Eagle Field; Denton, TX	W 6–0	
*Non-conference game
