= 1932 TCU Horned Frogs football team =

American college football season

1932 TCU Horned Frogs football

SWC champion
- Conference: Southwest Conference
- Record: 10–0–1 (6–0 SWC)
- Head coach: Francis Schmidt (4th season)
- Home stadium: Amon G. Carter Stadium

1932 Southwest Conference football standings
	Conf.					Overall
Team	W		L		T	W		L		T
No. 10 TCU $	6	–	0	–	0	10	–	0	–	1
Texas	5	–	1	–	0	8	–	2	–	0
Rice	3	–	3	–	0	7	–	3	–	0
Texas A&M	1	–	2	–	2	4	–	4	–	2
Baylor	1	–	4	–	1	3	–	5	–	1
SMU	1	–	4	–	1	3	–	7	–	2
Arkansas	1	–	4	–	0	1	–	6	–	2
$ – Conference champion; Rankings from Dickinson System

The 1932 TCU Horned Frogs football team represented Texas Christian University (TCU) in the 1932 college football season. The Horned Frogs finished the season 10–0–1 overall and 6–0 in the Southwest Conference. The team was coached by Francis Schmidt in his fourth year as head coach. The Frogs played their home games in Amon G. Carter Stadium, which is located on campus in Fort Worth, Texas.

== Schedule ==
Date	Time	Opponent	Site	Result	Attendance	Source
September 17		North Texas State Teachers*	Amon G. Carter Stadium; Fort Worth, TX	W 14–2		
September 24		at LSU*	Tiger Stadium; Baton Rouge, LA	T 3–3		
October 1		Daniel Baker*	Amon G. Carter Stadium; Fort Worth, TX	W 55–0		
October 8		Arkansas	Amon G. Carter Stadium; Fort Worth, TX	W 34–12		
October 15		at Texas A&M	Kyle Field; College Station, TX (rivalry)	W 17–0		
October 22		Austin*	Amon G. Carter Stadium; Fort Worth, TX	W 68–0		
October 29		Baylor	Amon G. Carter Stadium; Fort Worth, TX (rivalry)	W 27–0		
November 4	8:00 p.m.	at Simmons (TX)*	Parramore Field; Abilene, TX	W 27–0	1,000	
November 11		Texas	Amon G. Carter Stadium; Fort Worth, TX (rivalry)	W 14–0		
November 19		at Rice	Rice Field; Houston, TX	W 16–9		
November 26		at SMU	Cotton Bowl; Dallas, TX (rivalry)	W 8–0		
*Non-conference game; All times are in Central time
