= 1932 Baylor Bears football team =

American college football season

1932 Baylor Bears football
- Conference: Southwest Conference
- Record: 3–5–1 (1–4–1 SWC)
- Head coach: Morley Jennings (7th season)
- Captain: Arthur "Dub" Norton
- Home stadium: Carroll Field

1932 Southwest Conference football standings
	Conf.					Overall
Team	W		L		T	W		L		T
No. 10 TCU $	6	–	0	–	0	10	–	0	–	1
Texas	5	–	1	–	0	8	–	2	–	0
Rice	3	–	3	–	0	7	–	3	–	0
Texas A&M	1	–	2	–	2	4	–	4	–	2
Baylor	1	–	4	–	1	3	–	5	–	1
SMU	1	–	4	–	1	3	–	7	–	2
Arkansas	1	–	4	–	0	1	–	6	–	2
$ – Conference champion; Rankings from Dickinson System

The 1932 Baylor Bears football team represented Baylor University in the Southwest Conference (SWC) during the 1932 college football season. In their seventh season under head coach Morley Jennings, the Bears compiled a 3–5–1 record (1–4–1 against conference opponents), tied for fifth place in the conference, and were outscored by opponents by a combined total of 92 to 77. They played their home games at Carroll Field in Waco, Texas. Arthur "Dub" Norton was the team captain.

== Schedule ==
Date	Opponent	Site	Result	Attendance	Source
October 1	St. Edward's (TX)*	Carroll Field; Waco, TX	W 32–0		
October 8	at Loyola (LA)*	Loyola Stadium; New Orleans, LA	W 18–0		
October 15	at Arkansas	Quigley Stadium; Little Rock, AR	L 6–20		
October 22	Texas A&M^{†}	Carroll Field; Waco, TX (rivalry)	T 0–0		
October 29	at TCU	Amon G. Carter Stadium; Fort Worth, TX (rivalry)	L 0–27		
November 5	Texas	Carroll Field; Waco, TX (rivalry)	L 0–19		
November 11	at Texas Tech*	Tech Field; Lubbock, TX (rivalry)	L 2–14	5,000–6,500	
November 19	SMU	Carroll Field; Waco, TX	W 19–0		
November 26	at Rice	Rice Field; Houston, TX	L 0–12		
*Non-conference game; ^{†}Homecoming
