= Jerry Thompson (athlete) =

American long-distance runner (1923–2021)

Jerald Stillwell "Jerry" Thompson (August 15, 1923 – August 26, 2021) was an American long-distance runner who competed in the 1948 Summer Olympics. Earlier in the year, he was NCAA Champion, though he was runner up to Curt Stone at the Olympic Trials. He was inducted into the Texas Track and Field Coaches Hall of Fame, Class of 2016. Thompson died in August 2021 at the age of 98.
