= List of Big 12 Conference champions =

Big 12 Conference
- Conference: NCAA
- Founded: February 25, 1994
- Commissioner: Brett Yormark (since 2022)
- Sports fielded: 25; men's: 10; women's: 15
- Division: Division I
- Subdivision: FBS
- No. of teams: 16
- Headquarters: Irving, Texas
- Region: South Atlantic; West North Central; West South Central
- Website: www.big12sports.com

Locations

The Big 12 Conference sponsors championships in 25 sports, 10 men's and 15 women's, with two women's sports to be added in the 2024–25 school year. The first conference championship awarded was the 1996 softball postseason tournament championship, which was won by Oklahoma.

From 2011 through 2016, the football champion was decided by regular-season play. Previously divisional titles were awarded based on regular-season conference results, with the teams with the best conference records from the North and South playing in the Big 12 Championship Game for the Big 12 title. Following changes in NCAA rules, the Big 12 will reinstate its football championship game in 2017, with the top two teams in the final conference standings advancing to the title game. Baseball, basketball, soccer, and tennis titles are awarded in both regular-season and tournament play. Cross country, golf, gymnastics, rowing, swimming and diving, track and field, and wrestling titles are awarded during an annual meet of participating teams. The volleyball and softball titles are awarded based on regular-season play. Softball previously held a post season tournament.

== Membership ==
=== Current membership ===
All-Time Big 12 Championships by University (through November 14, 2026)
University	Years	Regular Season	Postseason	Total
Arizona Wildcats	2024–present	2	4	6
Arizona State Sun Devils	2024–present	3	6	9
Baylor Bears	1996–present	48	41	89
BYU Cougars	2023–present	1	8	9
Cincinnati Bearcats	2023–present	0	0	0
Colorado Buffaloes	1996–2011, 2024–present	5	29	34
Houston Cougars	2023–present	2	1	3
Iowa State Cyclones	1996–present	4	28	32
Kansas Jayhawks	1996–present	26	21	47
Kansas State Wildcats	1996–present	11	7	18
Oklahoma State Cowboys	1996–present	16	91	107
TCU Horned Frogs	2012–present	17	12	29
Texas Tech Red Raiders	1996–present	17	28	45
UCF Knights	2023–present	2	2	4
Utah Utes	2024–present	2	2	4
West Virginia Mountaineers	2012–present	8	7	15

=== Former members ===
Team	Years	Regular season	Postseason	Total
Missouri Tigers	1996–2012	6	7	13
Nebraska Cornhuskers	1996–2011	33	47	80
Oklahoma Sooners	1996–2024	39	60	99
Texas Longhorns	1996–2024	67	158	225
Texas A&M Aggies	1996–2012	20	38	58

=== Affiliate members ===
Team	Years	Regular season	Postseason	Total
Denver Pioneers	2016-present	1	0	1
Florida Gators	2024-present	2	1	3
Florida State Seminoles	2026-present	0	1	1

Other current affiliate members:

- Beach volleyball
  - Boise State Broncos
  - South Carolina Gamecocks
- Women's equestrian
  - Fresno State Bulldogs
- Women's lacrosse
  - San Diego State Aztecs
  - UC Davis Aggies
  - Florida Gators
- Women's rowing
  - Old Dominion Monarchs
  - Tulsa Golden Hurricane
- Men's wrestling
  - Missouri Tigers
  - Northern Iowa Panthers
  - Oklahoma Sooners
  - Utah Valley Wolverines
  - Wyoming Cowboys

== Baseball ==
All current Big 12 members sponsor baseball except Iowa State, which dropped the sport after the 2001 season, and Colorado, which never sponsored baseball during its first conference tenure and still does not sponsor the sport.

Baseball titles by season
Season	Regular season	Tournament
1997	Texas Tech	Oklahoma
1998	Texas A&M	Texas Tech
1999	Texas A&M	Nebraska
2000	Baylor	Nebraska
2001	Nebraska	Nebraska
2002	Texas	Texas
2003	Nebraska	Texas
2004	Texas	Oklahoma State
2005	Baylor	Nebraska
2005	Nebraska	Nebraska
2006	Texas	Kansas
2007	Texas	Texas A&M
2008	Texas A&M	Texas
2009	Texas	Texas
2010	Texas	Texas A&M
2011	Texas	Texas A&M
2011	Texas A&M	Texas A&M
2012	Baylor	Missouri
2013	Kansas State	Oklahoma
2014	Oklahoma State	TCU
2015	TCU	Texas
2016	Texas Tech	TCU
2017	TCU	Oklahoma State
2017	Texas Tech	Oklahoma State
2018	Texas	Baylor
2019	Texas Tech	Oklahoma State
2020		
2021	TCU	TCU
2021	Texas	TCU
2022	TCU	Oklahoma
2023	Oklahoma State	TCU
2023	Texas	TCU
2023	West Virginia	TCU
2024	Oklahoma	Oklahoma State
2025	West Virginia	Arizona
2026	Kansas	Kansas
2027		

Baseball titles by school
Team	Seasons	Regular season	Tournament	Total
Arizona	2025–present	0	1	1
Arizona State	2025–present	0	0	0
Baylor	1997–present	3	1	4
BYU	2024–present	0	0	0
Cincinnati	2024–present	0	0	0
Houston	2024–present	0	0	0
Iowa State	1997–2001	0	0	0
Kansas	1997–present	1	2	3
Kansas State	1997–present	1	0	1
Oklahoma State	1997–present	2	4	6
TCU	2013–present	4	4	8
Texas Tech	1997–present	4	1	5
UCF	2024–present	0	0	0
Utah	2025–present	0	0	0
West Virginia	2013–present	2	0	2

Baseball titles by former school
Team	Seasons	Regular season	Tournament	Total
Missouri	1997–2012	0	1	1
Nebraska	1997–2011	3	4	7
Oklahoma	1997–2024	1	3	4
Texas	1997–2024	10	5	15
Texas A&M	1997–2012	4	3	7

== Men's basketball ==
Men's Basketball titles by season
Season	Regular season	Tournament
1997	Kansas	Kansas
1998	Kansas	Kansas
1999	Texas	Kansas
2000	Iowa State	Iowa State
2001	Iowa State	Oklahoma
2002	Kansas	Oklahoma
2003	Kansas	Oklahoma
2004	Oklahoma State	Oklahoma State
2005	Kansas^{†}	Oklahoma State
2005	Oklahoma^{†}	Oklahoma State
2006	Kansas^{†}	Kansas
2006	Texas^{†}	Kansas
2007	Kansas	Kansas
2008	Kansas^{†}	Kansas
2008	Texas^{†}	Kansas
2009	Kansas	Missouri
2010	Kansas	Kansas
2011	Kansas	Kansas
2012	Kansas	Missouri
2013	Kansas^{†}	Kansas
2013	Kansas State^{†}	Kansas
2014	Kansas	Iowa State
2015	Kansas	Iowa State
2016	Kansas	Kansas
2017	Kansas	Iowa State
2018	Kansas	Kansas
2019	Kansas State^{†}	Iowa State
2019	Texas Tech^{†}	Iowa State
2020	Kansas	
2021	Baylor	Texas
2022	Baylor^{†}	Kansas
2022	Kansas^{†}	Kansas
2023	Kansas	Texas
2024	Houston	Iowa State
2025	Houston	Houston
2026	Arizona	Arizona
2027		

Men's Basketball titles by school
Team	Season	Regular season	Tournament	Total
Arizona	2025–present	1	1	2
Arizona State	2025–present	0	0	0
Baylor	1997–present	2	0	2
BYU	2023–present	0	0	0
Cincinnati	2023–present	0	0	0
Colorado	1997–2011, 2025–present	0	0	0
Houston	2023–present	2	1	3
Iowa State	1997–present	2	6	8
Kansas	1997–present	21	12	33
Kansas State	1997–present	2	0	2
Oklahoma State	1997–present	1	2	3
TCU	2013–present	0	0	0
Texas Tech	1997–present	1	0	1
UCF	2023–present	0	0	0
Utah	2025–present	0	0	0
West Virginia	2013–present	0	0	0

Men's Basketball titles by former schools
Team	Season	Regular season	Tournament	Total
Missouri	1997–2012	0	2	2
Oklahoma	1997–2024	1	3	4
Texas	1997–2024	3	2	5
Texas A&M	1997–2012	0	0	0

== Women's basketball ==
Women's Basketball titles by season
Season	Regular season	Tournament
1997	Kansas	Colorado
1998	Texas Tech	Texas Tech
1999	Texas Tech	Texas Tech
2000	Iowa State^{†}	Iowa State
2000	Texas Tech^{†}	Iowa State
2000	Oklahoma^{†}	Iowa State
2001	Oklahoma	Iowa State
2002	Oklahoma	Oklahoma
2003	Texas	Texas
2004	Texas^{†}	Oklahoma
2004	Kansas State^{†}	Oklahoma
2005	Baylor	Baylor
2006	Oklahoma	Oklahoma
2007	Oklahoma^{†}	Oklahoma
2007	Texas A&M^{†}	Oklahoma
2008	Kansas State	Texas A&M
2009	Oklahoma	Baylor
2010	Nebraska	Texas A&M
2011	Baylor	Baylor
2012	Baylor	Baylor
2013	Baylor	Baylor
2014	Baylor^{†}	Baylor
2014	West Virginia^{†}	Baylor
2015	Baylor	Baylor
2016	Baylor	Baylor
2017	Baylor	West Virginia
2018	Baylor	Baylor
2019	Baylor	Baylor
2020	Baylor	
2021	Baylor	Baylor
2022	Baylor	Texas
2023	Texas^{†}	Iowa State
2023	Oklahoma^{†}	Iowa State
2024	Oklahoma	Texas
2025	TCU	TCU
2026	TCU	West Virginia
2027		

Women's basketball titles by school
Team	Seasons	Regular season	Tournament	Total
Arizona	2024–present	0	0	0
Arizona State	2024–present	0	0	0
Baylor	1997–present	13	11	23
BYU	2023–present	0	0	0
Cincinnati	2023–present	0	0	0
Colorado	1997–2011, 2024–present	0	1	1
Houston	2023–present	0	0	0
Iowa State	1997–present	1	3	4
Kansas	1997–present	1	0	1
Kansas State	1997–present	2	0	2
Oklahoma State	1997–present	0	0	0
TCU	2013–present	2	1	3
Texas Tech	1997–present	3	2	5
UCF	2023–present	0	0	0
Utah	2024–present	0	0	0
West Virginia	2013–present	1	2	3

Women's basketball titles by former school
Team	Seasons	Regular season	Tournament	Total
Nebraska	1997–2011	1	0	1
Oklahoma	1997–2024	8	4	12
Texas	1997–2024	3	3	6
Texas A&M	1997–2012	1	2	3

== Beach volleyball ==
Beach volleyball, organized by the NCAA only for women, is the first of two women's sports that were added in 2024–25. Established full member TCU was joined by incoming members Arizona, Arizona State, and Utah. The Big 12 planned to add other schools in that sport to meet the sponsorship level required for an automatic bid to the NCAA tournament, but gave no timetable for any additions. After the 2025 season, Utah dropped beach volleyball and the Big 12 added Boise State, Florida State, and South Carolina as new associates.

Women's Beach Volleyball titles by season
Season	Regular season	Tournament
2025		TCU
2026		Florida State
2027		

Women's Beach Volleyball titles by school
Team	Seasons	Regular season	Tournament	Total
Arizona	2025–present	0	0	0
Arizona State	2025–present	0	0	0
Boise State	2026–present	0	0	0
Florida State	2026–present	0	1	1
South Carolina	2026–present	0	0	0
TCU	2025–present	0	1	1
Utah	2025	0	0	0

== Men's cross country ==
All current Big 12 schools sponsor men's cross country except UCF, Utah, and West Virginia.

Men's Cross Country titles by season
Season	Champion
1996	Colorado
1997	Colorado
1998	Colorado
1999	Colorado
2000	Colorado
2001	Colorado
2002	Colorado
2003	Colorado
2004	Colorado
2005	Colorado
2006	Colorado
2007	Colorado
2008	Oklahoma State
2009	Oklahoma State
2010	Oklahoma State
2011	Oklahoma State
2012	Oklahoma State
2013	Oklahoma State
2014	Oklahoma State
2015	Oklahoma State
2016	Oklahoma State
2017	Iowa State
2018	Iowa State
2019	Iowa State
2020	Oklahoma State
2021	Oklahoma State
2022	Oklahoma State
2023	Oklahoma State
2024	BYU
2025	Oklahoma State
2026	Colorado

Men's Cross Country titles by school
Team	Championships
Arizona	0
Arizona	0
Baylor	0
BYU	1
Cincinnati	0
Colorado	13
Houston	0
Iowa State	3
Kansas	0
Kansas State	0
Oklahoma State	14
TCU	0
Texas Tech	0
Utah	0

== Women's cross country ==
All current Big 12 schools sponsor women's cross country.

Women's Cross Country titles by year
Season	Champion
1996	Colorado
1997	Colorado
1998	Kansas State
1999	Colorado
2000	Colorado
2001	Colorado
2002	Colorado
2003	Colorado
2004	Colorado
2005	Colorado
2006	Colorado
2007	Colorado
2008	Texas Tech
2009	Texas Tech
2010	Texas Tech
2011	Iowa State
2012	Iowa State
2013	Iowa State
2014	Iowa State
2015	Oklahoma State
2016	Iowa State
2017	Iowa State
2018	Iowa State
2019	Oklahoma State
2020	Iowa State
2021	Oklahoma State
2022	Oklahoma State
2023	BYU
2024	BYU
2025	BYU
2026	BYU

Women's Cross Country titles by school
Team	Championships
Arizona	0
Arizona State	0
Baylor	0
BYU	4
Cincinnati	0
Colorado	11
Houston	0
Iowa State	8
Kansas	0
Kansas State	1
Oklahoma State	4
TCU	0
Texas Tech	3
UCF	0
Utah	0
West Virginia	0

== Equestrian ==
Four schools participate in equestrian—full members Baylor, Oklahoma State, and TCU, plus associate member Fresno State. Kansas State discontinued its equestrian team after the 2016 season.

Equestrian titles by year
Season	Champion
2009	Oklahoma State
2010	Baylor
2011	Texas A&M
2012	Oklahoma State
2013	Oklahoma State
2014	Oklahoma State
2015	Baylor
2016	Oklahoma State
2017	Baylor
2018	Oklahoma State
2019	Baylor
2020	
2021	Oklahoma State
2022	Oklahoma State
2023	Oklahoma State
2024	Oklahoma State
2025	Oklahoma State
2026	Oklahoma State
2027	

Equestrian titles by school
Team	Championships
Baylor	4
Fresno State	0
Kansas State	0
Oklahoma State	12
TCU	0
Texas A&M	1

== Football ==
=== Current football members ===
Football titles by school
Team	Season	Division titles	Conference titles (champ. game)	Conference titles (regular season)	Total
Kansas State	1996–present	4	2	1	7
Colorado	1996–2010, 2024–present	4	1	0	5
Baylor	1996–present	0	1	2	3
Oklahoma State	1996–present	1	0	1	2
Iowa State	1996–present	1	0	0	1
Kansas	1996–present	1	0	0	1
Texas Tech	1996–present	1	1	0	2
TCU	2012–present	N/A	0	1	1
Arizona	2024–present	N/A	0	0	0
Arizona State	2024–present	N/A	1	0	1
BYU	2023–present	N/A	0	0	0
Cincinnati	2023–present	N/A	0	0	0
Houston	2023–present	N/A	0	0	0
UCF	2023–present	N/A	0	0	0
Utah	2024–present	N/A	0	0	0
West Virginia	2012–present	N/A	0	0	0

=== Previous football members ===
Football titles by school
Team	Seasons	Division titles	Conference titles (champ. game)	Conference titles (regular season)	Total
Oklahoma	1996–2023	8	11	3	21
Texas	1996–2023	7	4	0	11
Nebraska	1996–2010	9	2	0	11
Texas A&M	1996–2011	3	1	0	4
Missouri	1996–2011	3	0	0	3

This list reflects the official Big 12 totals by including division championships (1996–2010), conference championships won through a postseason championship game (1996–2010 and 2017–present), and conference championships won through the regular season (2011–2016).
The Big 12 counts shared division championships as a full championship for each school, regardless of what school went on to play in the Big 12 title game.

Big 12 Championship Game (1996–2010, 2017–present)
Season	North Division Representative	South Division Representative	Big 12 Champion
1996	Nebraska	Texas	Texas
1997	Nebraska	Texas A&M	Nebraska
1998	Kansas State	Texas A&M	Texas A&M
1999	Nebraska	Texas	Nebraska
2000	Kansas State	Oklahoma	Oklahoma
2001	Colorado	Texas	Colorado
2002	Colorado	Oklahoma	Oklahoma
2003	Kansas State	Oklahoma	Kansas State
2004	Colorado	Oklahoma	Oklahoma
2005	Colorado	Texas	Texas
2006	Nebraska	Oklahoma	Oklahoma
2007	Missouri	Oklahoma	Oklahoma
2008	Missouri	Oklahoma	Oklahoma
2009	Nebraska	Texas	Texas
2010	Nebraska	Oklahoma	Oklahoma
Season	#1 Seed	#2 Seed	Big 12 Champion
2017	Oklahoma	TCU	Oklahoma
2018	Oklahoma	Texas	Oklahoma
2019	Oklahoma	Baylor	Oklahoma
2020	Iowa State	Oklahoma	Oklahoma
2021	Oklahoma State	Baylor	Baylor
2022	TCU	Kansas State	Kansas State
2023	Texas	Oklahoma State	Texas
2024	Arizona State	Iowa State	Arizona State
2025	Texas Tech	BYU	Texas Tech
2026			

Note: While the team playing in the championship game from 1996 through 2010 was popularly regarded as the divisional champion, the Big 12 did officially recognize co-champions in football, just like it does in other sports. As a result, the following teams are also recognized as champions by the Big 12:
North Co-Champions: Kansas State (1999), Nebraska (2000, 2001, 2008), Iowa State (2004), Kansas (2007), Missouri (2010)
South Co-Champions: Texas (2002, 2008), Texas Tech (2008), Oklahoma State (2010), Texas A&M (2010)

2011–2016

When Nebraska and Colorado left the conference after the 2010 season, it left the conference with only 10 members. The conference did not replace the two teams and therefore eliminated the Big 12 Championship game. Under the new format, which remained in place through the 2016 season, every team played each other and the team with the best conference record won the Big 12 title. In the event of a tie between two teams or more teams for the best conference record, then they were determined co-champions. Through the 2013 season, the winner of the head-to-head game earned the BCS berth in the Fiesta Bowl. This was later changed and the league recognized a tie-breaker starting in 2015. The change was made after the B12 was left out of the inaugural four-team College Football Playoff in 2014. The B12 presented TCU and Baylor as co-champs to the College Football Committee in 2014, despite Baylor having the head-to-head win over TCU. The move was seen as a play by the conference to get two teams invited into the new format, which backfired, leaving both teams out.

Following a 2016 change in NCAA rules that allowed FBS conferences to stage championship games regardless of their membership numbers, the Big 12 announced it would reinstate its championship game starting in 2017. The conference continued to play a full round-robin conference schedule until it expanded to 14 members in 2023 (and to 16 in 2024). The top two teams at the end of the conference season (with tiebreakers used as needed) play in the championship game.

With the launch of the College Football Playoff (CFP) in 2014, which coincided with a reworking of bowl tie-ins, the Big 12 tie to the Fiesta Bowl ended.

- The Big 12's primary bowl partner is now the Sugar Bowl, In years when that game is not a CFP semifinal, the top teams from the Big 12 and SEC, as chosen by the CFP selection committee, will play one another. If either conference provides a team for the CFP semifinals, the top non-playoff team from that conference will go to the Sugar Bowl.
- When the Sugar Bowl is hosting a semifinal, the top Big 12 team not involved in the playoff will receive a berth in either the Cotton Bowl, Fiesta Bowl, or Peach Bowl.

Big 12 Champions (2011–2016)
Season	Big 12 Champion
2011	Oklahoma State
2012	Kansas State*; Oklahoma
2013	Baylor
2014	Baylor*; TCU
2015	Oklahoma
2016	Oklahoma

Note: * Head to head winner

== Men's golf ==
All current Big 12 members sponsor men's golf. The most recent school to add the sport while a Big 12 member is West Virginia, which added that sport starting in the 2015–16 season.

Men's Golf titles by year
Season	Champion
1997	Oklahoma State
1998	Oklahoma State
1999	Kansas
2000	Oklahoma State
2001	Baylor
2002	Texas
2003	Texas
2004	Texas
2005	Oklahoma State
2006	Oklahoma
2007	Oklahoma State
2008	Oklahoma State
2009	Oklahoma State
2010	Oklahoma State
2011	Oklahoma State
2012	Texas A&M
2013	Texas
2014	Texas
2015	Texas
2016	Texas
2017	Texas
2018	Oklahoma
2019	Oklahoma State
2020	
2021	Oklahoma State
2022	Oklahoma
2023	Oklahoma
2024	Texas
2025	Oklahoma State
2026	Oklahoma State
2027	

Men's Golf titles by school
Team	Championships
Arizona	0
Arizona State	0
Baylor	1
BYU	0
Cincinnati	0
Colorado	0
Houston	0
Iowa State	0
Kansas	1
Kansas State	0
Oklahoma State	13
TCU	0
Texas Tech	0
UCF	0
Utah	0
West Virginia	0

Men's Golf titles by former schools
Team	Championships
Oklahoma	4
Texas	9
Texas A&M	1

== Women's golf ==
All current Big 12 members sponsor women's golf except Utah and West Virginia.

Women's Golf titles by year
Season	Champion
1997	Texas
1998	Texas A&M
1999	Oklahoma State
2000	Oklahoma
2001	Oklahoma State
2002	Oklahoma State
2003	Oklahoma State
2004	Texas
2005	Oklahoma State
2006	Texas A&M
2007	Texas A&M
2008	Oklahoma State
2009	Oklahoma State
2010	Texas A&M
2011	Texas
2012	Oklahoma
2013	Oklahoma State
2014	Oklahoma
2015	Baylor
2016	Oklahoma State
2017	Texas
2018	Texas
2019	Texas
2020	
2021	Oklahoma State
2022	Texas
2023	Oklahoma State
2024	Texas
2025	Arizona
2026	Iowa State
2027	

Women's Golf titles by school
Team	Championships
Arizona	1
Arizona State	0
Baylor	1
BYU	0
Cincinnati	0
Colorado	0
Houston	0
Iowa State	1
Kansas	0
Kansas State	0
Oklahoma State	11
TCU	0
Texas Tech	0
UCF	0

Women's Golf titles by former schools
Team	Championships
Oklahoma	3
Texas	8
Texas A&M	4

== Women's gymnastics ==
The Big 12 currently has seven women's gymnastics members—full members Arizona, Arizona State, BYU, Iowa State, Utah and West Virginia, plus Denver, an affiliate since the 2015–16 season.

Women's Gymnastics titles by season
Season	Champion
1997	Nebraska
1998	Nebraska
1999	Nebraska
2000	Iowa State
2001	Nebraska
2002	Nebraska
2003	Nebraska
2004	Oklahoma
2005	Nebraska
2006	Iowa State
2007	Nebraska
2008	Oklahoma
2009	Oklahoma
2010	Oklahoma
2011	Nebraska
2012	Oklahoma
2013	Oklahoma
2014	Oklahoma
2015	Oklahoma
2016	Oklahoma
2017	Oklahoma
2018	Oklahoma
2019	Oklahoma
2020	
2021	Denver
2022	Oklahoma
2023	Oklahoma
2024	Oklahoma
2025	Utah
2026	Utah
2027	

Women's Gymnastics titles by school
Team	Championships
Arizona	0
Arizona State	0
BYU	0
Denver	1
Iowa State	2
Nebraska	9
Oklahoma	15
Utah	2
West Virginia	0

Women's Gymnastics titles by former schools
Team	Championships
Nebraska	9
Oklahoma	15

== Women's lacrosse ==
Women's lacrosse is the other women's sport added in 2024–25. At the time of announcement, Cincinnati was the only full member that sponsored the sport, joined by incoming members Arizona State and Colorado. As in the case of beach volleyball, the other new sport for 2024–25, the Big 12 planned to add other schools to meet the sponsorship level required for an automatic bid to the NCAA tournament, but gave no timetable for any additions. In February 2024, the conference announced the arrival of three associates for its first women's lacrosse season—Florida, San Diego State, and UC Davis.

Women's Lacrosse titles by season
Season	Regular season	Tournament
2025	Florida	Florida
2026	Florida	Colorado
2027		

Women's Lacrosse titles by school
Team	Seasons	Regular season	Tournament	Total
Arizona State	2025–present	0	0	0
Cincinnati	2025–present	0	0	0
Colorado	2025–present	0	1	1
Florida	2025–present	2	1	3
San Diego State	2025–present	0	0	0
UC Davis	2025–present	0	0	0

== Rowing ==
In the 2014–15 school year, rowing was the only Big 12 sport with affiliate members. Before that school year, the Big 12 and Conference USA (CUSA) had a rowing alliance in which all Big 12 rowing schools would participate in the CUSA championship as well as the Big 12 championship. CUSA dropped rowing after the departure of most of its rowing members for other conferences. The Big 12 then took in the three remaining schools from the CUSA rowing league (Alabama, Old Dominion, and Tennessee) as single-sport affiliates. Old Dominion left Big 12 rowing after the 2017–18 season to join the American Athletic Conference, but returned to Big 12 women's rowing in 2024–25. Full American Conference member Tulsa also joined for women's rowing in 2024–25.

Since 2015–16, the Big 12 has also had affiliates in women's gymnastics and men's wrestling, and now has affiliates in beach volleyball and women's equestrian as well.

The departure of Oklahoma and Texas in 2024 for the SEC allowed that conference to begin sponsoring women's rowing. Both schools that were affiliates in the 2023–24 season (Alabama and Tennessee) are charter SEC members, and SEC bylaws allow it to hold a championship in any sport sponsored by at least 25% of the full membership (four schools). The Big 12's announcement of the arrival of Old Dominion and Tulsa hinted at the departure of Alabama and Tennessee. Neither SEC member was included in the list of Big 12 rowing members for 2024–25, and the SEC indeed added rowing for 2024–25 with Alabama, Oklahoma, Tennessee, and Texas as the initial members.

Rowing titles by year
Season	Champion
2009	Texas
2010	Texas
2011	Texas
2012	Texas
2013	Oklahoma
2014	Oklahoma
2015	Texas
2016	Texas
2017	Texas
2018	Texas
2019	Texas
2020	
2021	Texas
2022	Texas
2023	Texas
2024	Texas
2025	UCF
2026	UCF
2027	

Rowing titles by school
Team	Championships
Alabama	0
Kansas	0
Kansas State	0
Oklahoma	2
Old Dominion	0
Tennessee	0
Texas	12
Tulsa	0
UCF	2
West Virginia	0

== Women's soccer ==
All current Big 12 members sponsor women's soccer. The most recent to add the sport was Kansas State, which announced in 2015 that it was adding the sport. The Wildcats played their first season in 2016 as an independent, and began playing a full Big 12 schedule in 2017.

Women's Soccer titles by season
Season	Regular season	Tournament
1996	Nebraska	Nebraska
1997	Texas A&M	Texas A&M
1998	Baylor	Nebraska
1999	Nebraska	Nebraska
2000	Nebraska	Nebraska
2001	Texas	Texas A&M
2002	Texas A&M	Nebraska
2003	Colorado	Oklahoma State
2004	Kansas^{†}	Texas A&M
2004	Texas A&M^{†}	Texas A&M
2005	Texas A&M	Texas A&M
2006	Texas A&M	Texas
2007	Texas A&M	Texas
2008	Oklahoma State	Missouri
2009	Missouri	Oklahoma State
2010	Texas A&M	Oklahoma State
2011	Oklahoma State	Texas A&M
2012	West Virginia	Baylor
2013	West Virginia	West Virginia
2014	West Virginia	West Virginia
2015	West Virginia	Texas Tech
2016	West Virginia	West Virginia
2017	Oklahoma State	Baylor
2018	Baylor	West Virginia
2019	Oklahoma State	Kansas
2020	TCU	
2021	TCU	TCU
2022	Texas	West Virginia
2023	Texas Tech	Texas
2024	TCU	Kansas
2025	TCU	BYU
2026	BYU	BYU

Women's Soccer titles by school
Team	Regular season	Tournament	Total
Arizona	0	0	0
Arizona State	0	0	0
Baylor	2	2	4
BYU	1	2	3
Cincinnati	0	0	0
Colorado	1	0	1
Houston	0	0	0
Iowa State	0	0	0
Kansas	1	2	3
Kansas State	0	0	0
Oklahoma State	4	3	7
TCU	4	1	5
Texas Tech	1	1	2
UCF	0	0	0
Utah	0	0	0
West Virginia	5	5	10

Women's Soccer titles by former schools
Team	Regular season	Tournament	Total
Missouri	1	1	2
Nebraska	3	5	8
Texas	2	3	5
Texas A&M	7	5	12

== Softball ==
Eleven Big 12 schools currently sponsor softball; Cincinnati, Colorado, Kansas State, TCU, and West Virginia do not.

Softball titles by season
Season	Regular season	Tournament
1996	Oklahoma	Oklahoma
1997	Missouri	Missouri
1998	Nebraska	Nebraska
1999	Oklahoma	Texas
2000	Oklahoma	Nebraska
2001	Nebraska	Oklahoma
2002	Texas	Texas
2003	Texas	Texas
2004	Nebraska	Nebraska
2005	Texas A&M	Texas
2006	Texas	Kansas
2007	Baylor	Oklahoma
2008	Texas A&M	Texas A&M
2009	Oklahoma	Missouri
2010	Texas	Oklahoma
2011	Missouri	No tournament
2012	Oklahoma	No tournament
2013	Oklahoma	No tournament
2014	Oklahoma	No tournament
2015	Oklahoma	No tournament
2016	Oklahoma	No tournament
2017	Oklahoma	Oklahoma
2018	Oklahoma	Oklahoma
2019	Oklahoma	— (Note: The 2019 conference tournament was canceled due to rain and resulting poor field conditions before pool play could be completed. Regular-season champion Oklahoma received the conference's automatic bid to the NCAA tournament.)
2020		
2021	Oklahoma	Oklahoma
2022	Oklahoma	Oklahoma State
2023	Oklahoma	Oklahoma
2024	Texas	Oklahoma
2025	Texas Tech	Texas Tech
2026	Texas Tech	Arizona State
2027		

Softball titles by school
Team	Regular season	Tournament	Total
Arizona	0	0	0
Arizona State	0	1	1
Baylor	1	0	1
BYU	0	0	0
Houston	0	0	0
Iowa State	0	0	0
Kansas	0	1	1
Oklahoma State	0	1	1
Texas Tech	2	1	3
Utah	0	0	0
UCF	0	0	0

Softball titles by former schools
Team	Regular season	Tournament	Total
Missouri	2	2	4
Nebraska	3	3	6
Oklahoma	15	9	24
Texas	5	4	9
Texas A&M	2	1	3

== Men's swimming & diving ==
Seven Big 12 schools currently sponsor men's swimming & diving: Arizona, Arizona State, BYU, Cincinnati, TCU, Utah, and West Virginia.

Men's Swim & Dive titles by season
Season	Champion
1997	Texas
1998	Texas
1999	Texas
2000	Texas
2001	Texas
2002	Texas
2003	Texas
2004	Texas
2005	Texas
2006	Texas
2007	Texas
2008	Texas
2009	Texas
2010	Texas
2011	Texas
2012	Texas
2013	Texas
2014	Texas
2015	Texas
2016	Texas
2017	Texas
2018	Texas
2019	Texas
2020	Texas
2021	Texas
2022	Texas
2023	Texas
2024	Texas
2025	Arizona State
2026	Arizona State
2027	

Men's Swim & Dive titles by school
Team	Championships
Arizona	0
Arizona State	2
BYU	0
Cincinnati	0
TCU	0
Utah	0
West Virginia	0

Men's Swim & Dive titles by former schools
Team	Championships
Texas	28

== Women's swimming & diving ==
Ten Big 12 schools currently sponsor women's swimming and diving: Arizona, Arizona State, BYU, Cincinnati, Houston, Iowa State, Kansas, TCU, Utah, and West Virginia.

Women's Swim & Dive titles by season
Season	Champion
1997	Nebraska
1998	Nebraska
1999	Texas
2000	Texas
2001	Texas
2002	Texas
2003	Texas
2004	Texas
2005	Texas
2006	Texas
2007	Texas A&M
2008	Texas A&M
2009	Texas
2010	Texas A&M
2011	Texas
2012	Texas A&M
2013	Texas
2014	Texas
2015	Texas
2016	Texas
2017	Texas
2018	Texas
2019	Texas
2020	Texas
2021	Texas
2022	Texas
2023	Texas
2024	Texas
2025	Arizona State
2026	Arizona State
2027	

Women's Swim & Dive titles by school
Team	Championships
Arizona	0
Arizona State	2
BYU	0
Cincinnati	0
Houston	0
Iowa State	0
Kansas	0
TCU	0
Utah	0
West Virginia	0

Women's Swim & Dive titles by former schools
Team	Championships
Nebraska	2
Texas	22
Texas A&M	4

== Men's tennis ==
Nine current Big 12 members sponsor men's tennis; Cincinnati, Colorado, Houston, Iowa State, the Kansas schools, and West Virginia do not.

Men's Tennis titles by season
Season	Regular season	Tournament
1997	Texas	Texas
1998	Texas	Texas A&M
1999	Texas	Texas
2000	Baylor	Texas A&M
2001	Texas A&M	Texas A&M
2002	Baylor	Baylor
2003	Baylor	Baylor
2004	Baylor	Baylor
2005	Baylor	Baylor
2006	Baylor^{†}	Texas
2006	Texas^{†}	Texas
2007	Baylor	Baylor
2008	Baylor^{†}	Baylor
2008	Texas^{†}	Baylor
2009	Baylor	Baylor
2010	Texas	Texas
2011	Baylor	Texas A&M
2012	Oklahoma	Oklahoma
2013	Baylor	Oklahoma
2014	Baylor^{†}	Baylor
2014	Texas^{†}	Baylor
2014	Oklahoma^{†}	Baylor
2015	Oklahoma^{†}	Oklahoma
2015	Baylor^{†}	Oklahoma
2016	TCU^{†}	TCU
2016	Texas Tech^{†}	TCU
2017	TCU	TCU
2018	TCU	Texas
2019	Texas	Baylor
2020		
2021	Baylor^{†}	Baylor
2021	TCU^{†}	Baylor
2021	Texas^{†}	Baylor
2022	TCU	Baylor
2023	Texas	TCU
2024	Texas	Texas
2025	TCU	Arizona
2026	Arizona	TCU
2027		

Men's Tennis titles by school
Team	Season	Regular season	Tournament	Total
Arizona	2025–present	1	1	2
Arizona State	2025–present	0	0	0
Baylor	1997–present	14	11	25
BYU	2024–present	0	0	0
Kansas	1997–2001	0	0	0
Oklahoma State	1997–present	0	0	0
TCU	2013–present	5	4	9
Texas Tech	1997–present	1	0	1
UCF	2024–present	0	0	0

Men's Tennis titles by former schools
Team	Season	Regular season	Tournament	Total
Oklahoma	1997–2024	3	3	6
Texas	1997–2024	12	6	18
Texas A&M	1997–2012	1	4	5

== Women's tennis ==
All current Big 12 members sponsor women's tennis.

Women's Tennis titles by season
Season	Regular season	Tournament
1997	Texas	Texas
1998	Texas	Texas
1999	Texas	Texas
2000	Texas	Texas
2001	Oklahoma State^{†}	Texas
2001	Texas^{†}	Texas
2002	Texas	Texas
2003	Baylor^{†}	Oklahoma State
2003	Texas A&M^{†}	Oklahoma State
2004	Texas	Texas A&M
2005	Baylor	Texas
2006	Baylor	Baylor
2007	Baylor^{†}	Baylor
2007	Texas^{†}	Baylor
2008	Baylor	Baylor
2009	Baylor	Baylor
2010	Baylor	Baylor
2011	Baylor	Baylor
2012	Texas Tech	Texas
2013	Baylor^{†}	Texas
2013	Texas Tech^{†}	Texas
2014	Baylor	Baylor
2015	Baylor	Baylor
2016	Oklahoma State	Oklahoma State
2017	Oklahoma State^{†}	Texas Tech
2017	Texas Tech^{†}	Texas Tech
2018	Texas	Texas
2019	Texas	Kansas
2020		
2021	Texas	Texas
2022	Oklahoma	Texas
2023	Texas^{†}	Texas
2023	Oklahoma^{†}	Texas
2024	Oklahoma State	Oklahoma State
2025	Oklahoma State^{†}	Texas Tech
2025	Texas Tech^{†}	Texas Tech
2025	UCF^{†}	Texas Tech
2026	UCF^{†}	TCU
2026	Arizona State^{†}	TCU
2027		

Women's Tennis titles by school
Team	Seasons	Regular season	Tournament	Total
Arizona	2025–present	0	0	0
Arizona State	2025–present	1	0	1
Baylor	1997–present	11	8	19
BYU	2024–present	0	0	0
Cincinnati	2024–present	0	0	0
Colorado	1997–2011, 2025–present	0	0	0
Houston	2024–present	0	0	0
Iowa State	1997–present	0	0	0
Kansas	1997–present	0	1	1
Kansas State	1997–present	0	0	0
Oklahoma State	1997–present	5	3	8
TCU	2013–present	0	1	1
Texas Tech	1997–present	4	2	6
Utah	2025–present	0	0	0
UCF	2024–present	2	0	2
West Virginia	2013–present	0	0	0

Women's Tennis titles by former schools
Team	Seasons	Regular season	Tournament	Total
Oklahoma	1997–2024	2	0	2
Texas	1997–2024	12	13	25
Texas A&M	1997–2012	1	1	2

== Men's track & field ==
All current Big 12 members sponsor men's track and field except UCF, Utah, and West Virginia.

Men's Track & Field titles by season
Season	Indoor Champion	Outdoor Champion
1997	Nebraska	Texas
1998	Nebraska	Nebraska
1999	Texas	Texas
2000	Nebraska	Nebraska
2001	Nebraska	Texas A&M
2002	Nebraska	Nebraska
2003	Nebraska	Texas
2004	Nebraska	Nebraska
2005	Nebraska	Texas Tech
2006	Texas	Texas
2007	Nebraska^{†}	Oklahoma
2007	Texas^{†}	Oklahoma
2008	Texas	Colorado
2009	Texas	Nebraska
2010	Oklahoma	Nebraska
2011	Texas A&M	Texas A&M
2012	Texas A&M	Texas A&M
2013	Texas	Texas
2014	Oklahoma State	Texas Tech
2015	Texas	Texas
2016	Oklahoma State	Texas
2017	Texas	Texas
2018	Texas Tech	Texas Tech
2019	Texas Tech	Texas Tech
2020	Iowa State	
2021	Texas	Texas
2022	Texas	Texas
2023	Texas Tech	Texas Tech
2024	Texas Tech	Texas
2025	Texas Tech	Texas Tech
2026	Texas Tech	Texas Tech
2027		

Men's Track & Field titles by school
Team	Indoor	Outdoor	Total
Arizona	0	0	0
Arizona State	0	0	0
Baylor	0	0	0
BYU	0	0	0
Cincinnati	0	0	0
Colorado	0	1	1
Houston	0	0	0
Iowa State	1	0	1
Kansas	0	0	0
Kansas State	0	0	0
Oklahoma State	2	0	2
TCU	0	0	0
Texas Tech	5	7	12

Men's Track & Field titles by former schools
Team	Indoor	Outdoor	Total
Nebraska	9	6	15
Oklahoma	1	1	2
Texas	10	10	20
Texas A&M	2	3	5

== Women's track & field ==
All current Big 12 members sponsor women's track and field.

Women's Track & Field titles by season
Season	Indoor Champion	Outdoor Champion
1997	Nebraska	Texas
1998	Texas	Texas
1999	Texas	Texas
2000	Nebraska	Nebraska
2001	Nebraska	Kansas State
2002	Texas	Kansas State
2003	Texas	Texas
2004	Nebraska	Texas
2005	Nebraska	Nebraska
2006	Texas	Texas
2007	Texas A&M	Texas A&M
2008	Texas A&M	Texas A&M
2009	Texas A&M	Texas A&M
2010	Texas A&M	Texas A&M
2011	Nebraska	Texas A&M
2012	Texas A&M	Texas
2013	Kansas	Kansas
2014	Texas	Texas
2015	Texas	Texas
2016	Texas	Texas
2017	Baylor	Kansas State
2018	Texas	Kansas State
2019	Texas	Texas
2020	Texas	
2021	Texas	Texas
2022	Texas	Texas
2023	Oklahoma State	Texas
2024	Texas	Texas
2025	Texas Tech	Texas Tech
2026	Texas Tech	Texas Tech
2027		

Women's Track & Field titles by school
Team	Indoor	Outdoor	Total
Arizona	0	0	0
Arizona State	0	0	0
Baylor	1	0	1
BYU	0	0	0
Cincinnati	0	0	0
Colorado	0	0	0
Houston	0	0	0
Iowa State	0	0	0
Kansas	1	1	2
Kansas State	0	4	4
Oklahoma State	1	0	1
TCU	0	0	0
Texas Tech	2	2	4
Utah	0	0	0
West Virginia	0	0	0

Women's Track & Field titles by former schools
Team	Indoor	Outdoor	Total
Nebraska	6	2	8
Texas	14	15	29
Texas A&M	5	5	10

== Volleyball ==
All current Big 12 members sponsor women's volleyball except Oklahoma State, which has never sponsored women's volleyball as a Big 12 member. With Vanderbilt reinstating women's volleyball in 2025 after a 45-year absence, Oklahoma State is the only Power Four conference member that does not sponsor women's volleyball. The only current member with a varsity men's team is BYU.

Volleyball titles by season
Season	Champion
1996	Nebraska
1997	Texas
1998	Nebraska
1999	Nebraska
2000	Nebraska
2001	Nebraska
2002	Nebraska
2003	Kansas State
2004	Nebraska
2005	Nebraska
2006	Nebraska
2007	Nebraska^{†}
2007	Texas^{†}
2008	Nebraska^{†}
2008	Texas^{†}
2009	Texas
2010	Nebraska
2011	Texas
2012	Texas
2013	Texas
2014	Texas
2015	Texas
2016	Kansas
2017	Texas
2018	Texas
2019	Baylor^{†}
2019	Texas^{†}
2020	Texas
2021	Texas
2022	Texas
2023	Texas
2024	Arizona State
2025	Arizona State
2026	BYU

Volleyball titles by school
Team	Championships
Arizona	0
Arizona State	2
Baylor	1
BYU	1
Cincinnati	0
Colorado	0
Houston	0
Iowa State	0
Kansas	1
Kansas State	1
TCU	0
Texas Tech	0
UCF	0
Utah	0
West Virginia	0

Volleyball titles by former schools
Team	Championships
Nebraska	12
Texas	16

== Men's wrestling ==
Men's wrestling crowned regular-season champions in 2011–12 and 2012–13 only.

In 2015, the Big 12 absorbed the Western Wrestling Conference, with that league's six final members becoming Big 12 affiliates effective with the 2015–16 school year. Fresno State and Northern Iowa became affiliates in 2017–18. Missouri became an affiliate during the 2021-22 season after Fresno State dropped its program, and California Baptist became an affiliate in 2022–23 once it completed its transition from NCAA Division II to Division I.

Oklahoma remained in Big 12 wrestling after otherwise joining the SEC, keeping that program together with the only other SEC member to sponsor the sport, former Big 12 member Missouri. Of the four schools that joined the Big 12 in 2024, only Arizona State sponsors wrestling. Five associate members left after the 2025–26 season—Cal Baptist dropped men's wrestling, and Air Force, North Dakota State, Northern Colorado, and South Dakota State left to become Pac-12 Conference affiliates.

Women's wrestling became an official NCAA championship sport in 2025–26, but no Big 12 member sponsors the sport. Iowa State will become the first such school in 2027–28.

Wrestling titles by season
Season	Regular season	Tournament
1997		Oklahoma State
1998		Oklahoma State
1999		Oklahoma
2000		Oklahoma State
2001		Oklahoma State
2002		Oklahoma
2003		Oklahoma State
2004		Oklahoma State
2005		Oklahoma State
2006		Oklahoma State
2007		Iowa State
2008		Iowa State
2009		Iowa State ^{†}
2009		Nebraska^{†}
2010		Oklahoma State
2011		Oklahoma State
2012	Oklahoma State	Missouri
2013	Oklahoma State	Oklahoma State
2014		Oklahoma State
2015		Oklahoma State
2016		Oklahoma State
2017		Oklahoma State
2018		Oklahoma State
2019		Oklahoma State
2020		Oklahoma State
2021		Oklahoma^{†}
2021		Oklahoma State ^{†}
2022		Missouri
2023		Missouri
2024		Iowa State
2025		Oklahoma State
2026		Oklahoma State
2027		

Wrestling titles by team
Team	Seasons	Regular season	Tournament	Total
Air Force	2016–2026	—	0	0
Arizona State	2025–present	—	0	0
California Baptist	2022–2026	—	0	0
Fresno State	2018–2021	—	0	0
Iowa State	1997–present	0	4	4
Missouri	1997–2012, 2021–present	—	3	3
Nebraska	1997–2011	—	1	1
North Dakota State	2016–2026	—	0	0
Northern Colorado	2016–2026	—	0	0
Northern Iowa	2018–present	—	0	0
Oklahoma	1997–present	0	3	3
Oklahoma State	1997–present	2	21	23
South Dakota State	2016–2026	—	0	0
Utah Valley	2016–present	—	0	0
West Virginia	2013–present	0	0	0
Wyoming	2016–present	—	0	0

== See also ==
- List of Big Eight Conference champions – previous conference of 8 charter members of Big 12
- List of Southwest Conference champions – previous conference of 4 charter members of Big 12

== Notes ==
^{†}denotes shared title
