= List of Southwest Conference champions =

This is a list of Southwest Conference champions.

== Baseball ==
=== Regular season ===
- Texas (64 titles, 56 outright): 1915, 1916, 1917, 1918, 1919, 1920, 1921, 1922, 1924, 1925, 1926, 1927, 1928, 1929, 1930, 1932, 1935, 1936, 1938, 1939, 1940, 1941, 1943*, 1945, 1946, 1947, 1948, 1949, 1950, 1951*, 1952, 1953*, 1954, 1957, 1958, 1960, 1961, 1962, 1963*, 1965, 1966*, 1967*, 1968, 1969, 1970, 1971, 1972*, 1973, 1974, 1975, 1976, 1979, 1980, 1981, 1982, 1983, 1984, 1985, 1986*, 1987, 1988, 1991, 1992, 1996
- Texas A&M (15, 10): 1931, 1934, 1937, 1942, 1943*, 1951*, 1955, 1959, 1964, 1966*, 1977, 1978, 1986*, 1989*, 1993
- TCU (7, 3): 1933, 1956, 1963*, 1966*, 1967*, 1972*, 1994
- Baylor (2, 1): 1923, 1966*
- Arkansas (2, 1): 1989*, 1990
- Texas Tech (1, 1): 1995
- SMU (1, 0): 1953*

* – Denotes shared title

Notes: No official champion in 1944 due to World War II.

Tiebreakers:

1943 – Texas and Texas A&M tied with a 2-2 record against each other.
1951 – Texas A&M advanced to NCAA tournament based on 2-1 record against Texas.
1953 – Texas advanced to NCAA tournament based on 2-1 record against SMU.
1963 – Texas advanced to NCAA tournament based on 2-1 record against TCU.
1966 – Texas advanced to NCAA tournament based on coin flip amongst Texas, Texas A&M, Baylor, and TCU.
1967 – Texas advanced to NCAA tournament based on 2-1 record against TCU.
1972 – Texas advanced to NCAA tournament based on 2-1 record against TCU.
1986 – Texas advanced to NCAA tournament based on 3-0 record against Texas A&M.

=== Tournament champions ===
- Texas (11 titles): 1979, 1980, 1981, 1982, 1983, 1984, 1987, 1988, 1990, 1991, 1994
- Baylor (3) 1977, 1978, 1993
- Texas A&M (2): 1986, 1989
- Arkansas (1): 1985
- Texas Tech (1): 1995
- Rice (1): 1996

Notes: Tournament started in 1977. No tournament in 1992.

Tournament Hosts:

- Austin, Texas (Texas): 1977, 1978, 1979, 1981, 1983, 1984, 1987, 1990, 1993, 1994
- College Station, Texas (Texas A&M): 1980, 1982, 1986, 1989, 1991, 1995
- Fayetteville, Arkansas (Arkansas): 1985, 1988
- Lubbock, Texas (Texas Tech): 1996

Additional references:

== Basketball ==
=== Men's ===
==== Regular season ====
- Arkansas (22 titles, 14 outright): 1926, 1927, 1928, 1929, 1930, 1935*, 1936, 1938, 1941, 1942*, 1944*, 1949*, 1950*, 1958*, 1977, 1978*, 1979*, 1981, 1982, 1989, 1990, 1991
- Texas (22, 12): 1915, 1916, 1917, 1919, 1924, 1933, 1939, 1943*, 1947, 1951*, 1954*, 1960, 1963, 1965*, 1972*, 1974, 1978*, 1979*, 1986*, 1992*, 1994, 1995*
- SMU (13, 8): 1935*, 1937, 1955, 1956, 1957, 1958*, 1962*, 1965*, 1966, 1967, 1972*, 1988, 1993
- Texas A&M (11, 9): 1920, 1921, 1922, 1923, 1951*, 1964, 1969, 1975, 1976, 1980, 1986*
- TCU (10, 8): 1931, 1934, 1951*, 1952, 1953, 1959, 1968, 1971, 1986*, 1987
- Rice (10, 4): 1918, 1935*, 1940, 1942*, 1943*, 1944*, 1945, 1949*, 1954*, 1970
- Texas Tech (6, 4): 1961, 1962*, 1973, 1985, 1995*, 1996
- Baylor (5, 3): 1932, 1946, 1948, 1949*, 1950*
- Houston (3, 2): 1983, 1984, 1992*
- Oklahoma State (1, 1): 1925 – as Oklahoma A&M

* – Denotes shared title

==== Tournament champions ====
- Arkansas (6 titles): 1977, 1979, 1982, 1989, 1990, 1991
- Texas Tech (5): 1976, 1985, 1986, 1993, 1996
- Houston (5): 1978, 1981, 1983, 1984, 1992
- Texas (2): 1994, 1995
- Texas A&M (2): 1980, 1987
- SMU (1): 1988

Additional reference:

Year	SWC Champion	Score	Runner-up	Most Outstanding Player	Venue (and city)
1976	Texas Tech	74-72	Texas A&M	Rick Bullock, Texas Tech	Moody Coliseum (Dallas, Texas)
1977	Arkansas	80-74	Houston	Ron Brewer, Arkansas	The Summit (Houston, Texas)
1978	Houston	92-90	Texas	Mike Schultz, Houston	The Summit (Houston, Texas)
1979	Arkansas	39-38	Texas	Sidney Moncrief, Arkansas	The Summit (Houston, Texas)
1980	Texas A&M	52-50	Arkansas	David Britton, Texas A&M	HemisFair Arena (San Antonio, Texas)
1981	Houston	84-59	Texas	Rob Williams, Houston	HemisFair Arena (San Antonio, Texas)
1982	Arkansas	84-69	Houston	Alvin Robertson, Arkansas	Reunion Arena (Dallas, Texas)
1983	Houston	62-59	TCU	Michael Young, Houston	Reunion Arena (Dallas, Texas)
1984	Houston	57-56	Arkansas	Akeem Olajuwon, Houston	The Summit (Houston, Texas)
1985	Texas Tech	67-64	Arkansas	Joe Kleine, Arkansas	Reunion Arena (Dallas, Texas)
1986	Texas Tech	67-63	Texas A&M	Tony Benford, Texas Tech	Reunion Arena (Dallas, Texas)
1987	Texas A&M	71-46	Baylor	Winston Crite, Texas A&M	Reunion Arena (Dallas, Texas)
1988	SMU	75-64	Baylor	Micheal Williams, Baylor	Reunion Arena (Dallas, Texas)
1989	Arkansas	100-76	Texas	Lenzie Howell, Arkansas	Reunion Arena (Dallas, Texas)
1990	Arkansas	96-84	Houston	Todd Day, Arkansas	Reunion Arena (Dallas, Texas)
1991	Arkansas	120-89	Texas	Oliver Miller, Arkansas	Reunion Arena (Dallas, Texas)
1992	Houston	91-72	Texas	Dexter Cambridge, Texas	Reunion Arena (Dallas, Texas)
1993	Texas Tech	88-76	Houston	Lance Hughes, Texas Tech	Reunion Arena (Dallas, Texas)
1994	Texas	87-62	Texas A&M	B. J. Tyler, Texas	Reunion Arena (Dallas, Texas)
1995	Texas	107-104 (OT)	Texas Tech	Terrence Rencher, Texas	Reunion Arena (Dallas, Texas)
1996	Texas Tech	75-73	Texas	Reggie Freeman, Texas	Reunion Arena (Dallas, Texas)

=== Regular season champions ===
School	Total titles	Winning Years
Texas	10 total titles 7 outright titles	1983, 1984, 1985, 1986, 1987, 1988, 1989, 1990*, 1993*, 1996*
Texas Tech	5 total titles 3 outright titles	1992, 1993*, 1994, 1995, 1996*
Arkansas	2 total titles 1 outright title	1990*, 1991

=== Tournament champions ===
School	Total titles	Winning Years
Texas	9	1983, 1984, 1985, 1986, 1987, 1988, 1989, 1990, 1994
Texas Tech	3	1992, 1993, 1995
Texas A&M	1	1996
Arkansas	1	1991

== Cross country ==
=== Men's ===
- Texas (33 titles, 32 outright): 1920, 1923, 1924, 1930, 1931, 1932, 1933*, 1934, 1935, 1936, 1937, 1938, 1939, 1940, 1941, 1942, 1943, 1944, 1945, 1946, 1947, 1954, 1955, 1960, 1963, 1964, 1965, 1967, 1969, 1972, 1973, 1991, 1993
- Arkansas (23, 23): 1951, 1956, 1957, 1958, 1959, 1966, 1974, 1975, 1976, 1977, 1978, 1979, 1980, 1981, 1982, 1983, 1984, 1985, 1986, 1987, 1988, 1989, 1990
- Texas A&M (13, 11): 1922, 1925, 1927, 1928*, 1929, 1933*, 1948, 1949, 1950, 1952, 1953, 1961, 1962
- SMU (4, 4): 1968, 1970, 1971, 1995
- Baylor (2, 2): 1992, 1994
- Rice (2, 1): 1926, 1928*
- Oklahoma State (1, 1): 1921 – as Oklahoma A&M

=== Women's ===
- Baylor (4 titles, 4 outright): 1990, 1991, 1992, 1993
- Texas (4, 3): 1985*, 1986 1987, 1989
- Houston (4, 3): 1982, 1983, 1984, 1985*
- SMU (1, 1): 1995
- Rice (1, 1): 1994
- Arkansas (1, 1): 1988

== Fencing (Men's) ==
- Texas (5): 1942, 1943, 1947, 1948, 1949
- Rice (3): 1950, 1951, 1956
- Baylor (3): 1939, 1940, 1941
- Texas A&M (3): 1952, 1954, 1955
- SMU (1): 1938

Competition was held every year beginning in 1938 and ending in 1956 except between 1944–1946 and 1953.

== Football ==
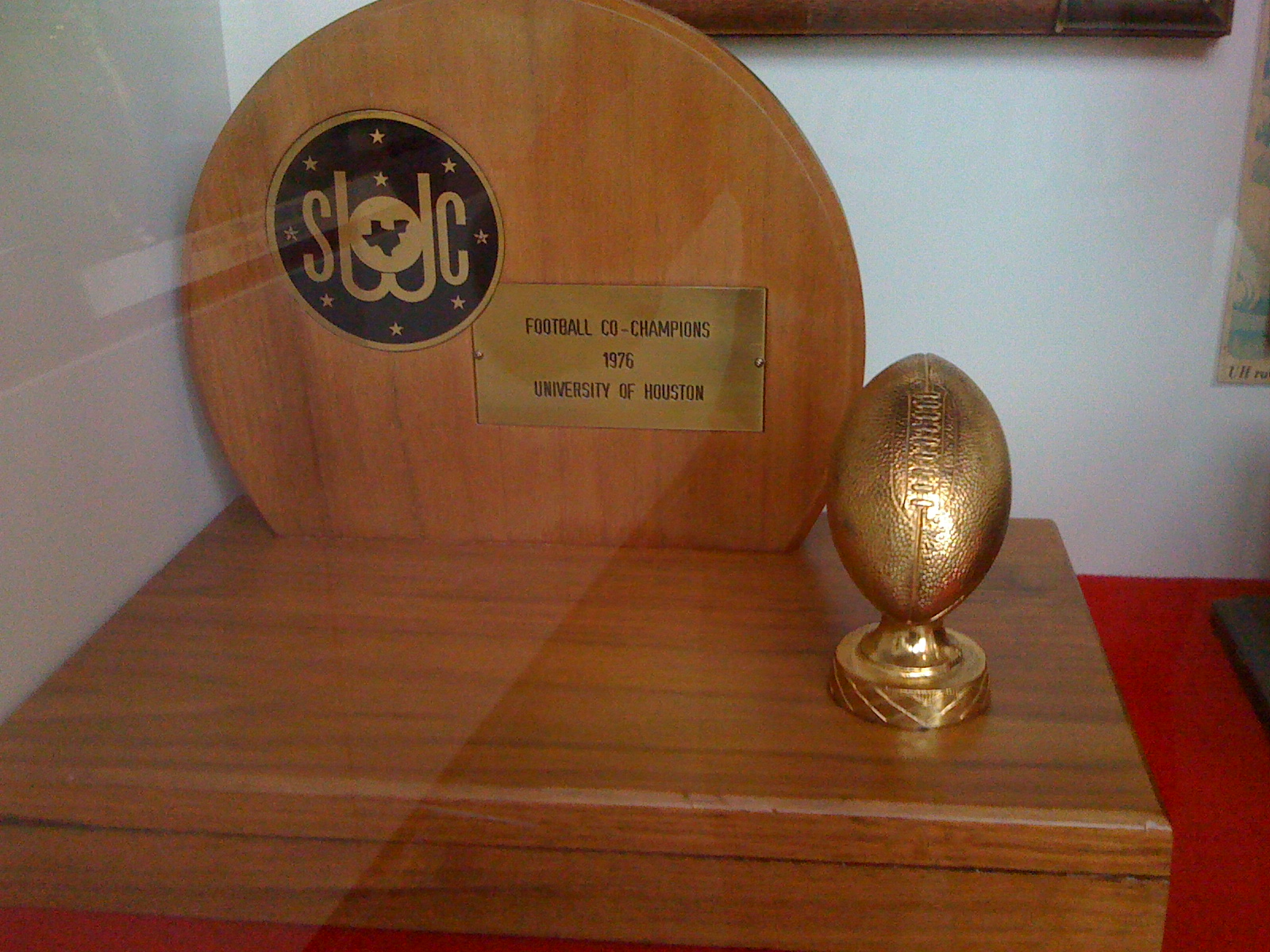
Houston's 1976 Southwest Conference football championship trophy

- Texas (27 titles, 19 outright): 1916, 1918, 1920, 1928, 1930, 1942, 1943, 1945, 1950, 1952, 1953*, 1959*, 1961*, 1962, 1963, 1968*, 1969, 1970, 1971, 1972, 1973, 1975*, 1977, 1983, 1990, 1994*, 1995
- Texas A&M (17, 15): 1917, 1919, 1921, 1925, 1927, 1939, 1940*, 1941, 1956, 1967, 1975*, 1985, 1986, 1987, 1991, 1992, 1993
- Arkansas (14, 7): 1933, 1936, 1946*, 1954, 1959*, 1960, 1961*, 1964, 1965, 1968*, 1975*, 1979*, 1988, 1989
- SMU (11, 9): 1923, 1926, 1931, 1935, 1940*, 1947, 1948, 1966, 1981, 1982, 1984*
- TCU (9, 7): 1929, 1932, 1938, 1944, 1951, 1955, 1958, 1959*, 1994*
- Baylor (7, 5): 1915*, 1916, 1922, 1924, 1974, 1980, 1994*
- Rice (7, 4): 1934, 1937, 1946*, 1949, 1953*, 1957, 1994*
- Houston (4, 1): 1976*, 1978, 1979*, 1984*
- Texas Tech (2, 0): 1976*, 1994*
- Oklahoma (1, 0): 1915*

* – Denotes shared title

Notes:

- Baylor forfeited its claim to a share of the 1915 title due to use of an ineligible player.
- Arkansas forfeited its claim to the 1933 title due to use of an ineligible player. No champion was named.
- No champions were named in 1916 and 1918. Baylor and Texas both finished the 1916 season tied for the best record.

In 1994, Texas A&M would have won the Southwest Conference title with a 6–0–1 record, but they were ruled ineligible for the conference title and postseason play due to NCAA sanctions. As such, the five teams which finished behind A&M with the same conference record of 4–3 were recognized as co-champions.

== Golf ==
=== Men's ===
- Texas (39 titles, 37 outright): 1927, 1928, 1932, 1933, 1934, 1935, 1936, 1937, 1938, 1940, 1941, 1942, 1943, 1944, 1945, 1946, 1947, 1949, 1950, 1951, 1952, 1954, 1964, 1965, 1968, 1970, 1972, 1973, 1974*, 1975*, 1981, 1983, 1989, 1990, 1991, 1992, 1993, 1994, 1995
- Texas A&M (10, 10): 1926, 1948, 1960, 1961, 1962, 1963, 1967, 1969, 1982, 1987
- Houston (9, 7): 1974*, 1975*, 1976, 1977, 1978, 1979, 1980, 1984, 1985
- SMU (5, 5): 1931, 1953, 1955, 1956, 1988
- Texas Tech (3, 3): 1959, 1971, 1996
- Rice (3, 3): 1929, 1930, 1939
- Baylor (2, 2): 1957, 1966
- TCU (1, 1): 1986
- Arkansas (1, 1): 1958

* – Denotes shared title

=== Women's ===
- Texas (10 titles): 1984, 1987, 1988, 1989, 1990, 1991, 1993, 1994, 1995, 1996
- SMU (2): 1986, 1992
- Texas A&M (1): 1985
- TCU (1): 1983

== Soccer ==
=== Men's ===
- TCU (2 titles): 1983, 1984

=== Women's ===
- SMU (1 title): 1995

== Swimming and diving ==
=== Men's ===
- Texas (38 titles, 37 outright): 1932, 1933, 1934, 1935, 1936, 1937, 1938, 1939, 1940, 1941, 1942, 1943, 1944*, 1946, 1947, 1948, 1949, 1950, 1951, 1952, 1955, 1980, 1981, 1982, 1983, 1984, 1985, 1986, 1987, 1988, 1989, 1990, 1991, 1992, 1993, 1994, 1995, 1996
- SMU (25, 25): 1953, 1954, 1957, 1958, 1959, 1960, 1961, 1962, 1963, 1964, 1965, 1966, 1967, 1968, 1969, 1970, 1971, 1972, 1973, 1974, 1975, 1976, 1977, 1978, 1979
- Texas A&M (3, 2): 1944*, 1945, 1956

* – Denotes shared title

=== Women's ===
- Texas (14 titles): 1983, 1984, 1985, 1986 1987, 1988, 1989, 1990, 1991, 1992, 1993, 1994, 1995, 1996

== Tennis ==
=== Men's ===
- Texas (14 titles, 13 outright): 1951, 1952, 1953, 1954, 1955, 1956, 1957, 1961, 1963, 1967, 1990, 1993, 1994*, 1995
- Rice (11, 11): 1958, 1959, 1962, 1964, 1965, 1966, 1968, 1969, 1970, 1971, 1972
- SMU (11, 11): 1960, 1973, 1975, 1977, 1978, 1979, 1982, 1983, 1985, 1986, 1987
- Arkansas (5, 4): 1980, 1981, 1984, 1988, 1989*
- TCU (5, 3): 1989*, 1991, 1992, 1994*, 1996
- Houston (2, 2): 1974, 1976
- Texas A&M (1, 0): 1994*

=== Men's tournament ===
- TCU (7): 1988, 1989, 1991, 1992, 1994, 1995 1996
- Texas (2): 1990, 1993

=== Women's ===
- Texas (12 titles, 11 outright): 1983, 1984, 1985, 1987, 1988*, 1989, 1990, 1992, 1993, 1994, 1995, 1996
- SMU (1, 0): 1988*
- Texas A&M (1, 1): 1986

=== Women's tournament ===
- Texas (9): 1988, 1989, 1990, 1991, 1992, 1993, 1994, 1995, 1996

* – Denotes shared title

== Track and field ==
=== Men's outdoor ===
- Texas (45 titles): 1915, 1916, 1920, 1923, 1924, 1925, 1926, 1927, 1932, 1933, 1934, 1935, 1936, 1937, 1940, 1941, 1942, 1944, 1945, 1946, 1950, 1954, 1955, 1956, 1957, 1958, 1959, 1961, 1966, 1968, 1969, 1972, 1973, 1974, 1975, 1976, 1977, 1979, 1986, 1987, 1992, 1993, 1994, 1995, 1996
- Texas A&M (15): 1921, 1922, 1929, 1930, 1943, 1947, 1948, 1949, 1951, 1952, 1953, 1970, 1978, 1980, 1981
- Arkansas (8): 1982, 1983, 1984, 1985, 1988, 1989, 1990, 1991
- Rice (8): 1928, 1931, 1938, 1939, 1964, 1965, 1967, 1971
- Baylor (3): 1960, 1962, 1963
- Oklahoma (2): 1918, 1919

Note: No competition was held in 1917

=== Men's indoor ===
- Arkansas (12 titles): 1979, 1981, 1982, 1983, 1984, 1985, 1986, 1987, 1988, 1989, 1990, 1991
- Texas (5): 1974, 1975, 1992, 1993, 1994
- Baylor (2): 1976, 1996
- Houston (2): 1977, 1978
- Rice (1): 1995
- Texas A&M (1): 1980

=== Women's outdoor ===
- Texas (11 titles): 1985, 1986, 1987, 1988, 1989, 1991, 1992, 1993, 1994, 1995, 1996
- Houston (3): 1983, 1984, 1990

=== Women's indoor ===
- Texas (12 titles): 1985, 1986, 1987*, 1988, 1989, 1990, 1991, 1992, 1993, 1994, 1995 1996
- Houston (3): 1983, 1984, 1987*

== Volleyball (women's) ==
=== Regular season ===
- Texas (13 titles): 1982, 1983, 1984, 1985, 1986, 1987, 1988, 1989, 1990, 1991, 1992, 1993, 1995
- Houston (1): 1994

=== Tournament champions ===
- Texas (3 titles): 1992, 1993, 1995
- Houston (1): 1994

== Wrestling ==
- Oklahoma State (6 titles): 1917, 1921, 1922, 1923, 1924, 1925 – as Oklahoma A&M

== See also ==
- List of Big 12 Conference champions
