= 1926 Texas A&M Aggies football team =

American college football season

1926 Texas A&M Aggies football
- Conference: Southwest Conference
- Record: 5–3–1 (1–3–1 SWC)
- Head coach: Dana X. Bible (9th season)
- Home stadium: Kyle Field

1926 Southwest Conference football standings
	Conf.					Overall
Team	W		L		T	W		L		T
SMU $	5	–	0	–	0	8	–	0	–	1
Baylor	3	–	1	–	1	6	–	3	–	1
TCU	1	–	1	–	2	6	–	1	–	2
Texas	2	–	2	–	0	5	–	4	–	0
Arkansas	2	–	2	–	0	5	–	5	–	0
Texas A&M	1	–	3	–	1	5	–	3	–	1
Rice	0	–	4	–	0	4	–	4	–	1
$ – Conference champion; Arkansas's games against Ole Miss, Centenary, and LSU counted in the conference standings.

The 1926 Texas A&M Aggies football team represented the Agricultural and Mechanical College of Texas—now known as Texas A&M University—in the Southwest Conference (SWC) during the 1926 college football season. In its ninth season under head coach Dana X. Bible, the team compiled an overall record of 5–3–1, with a mark of 1–3–1 in conference play, and finished sixth in the SWC. The Aggies outscored all opponents by a total of 184 to 59.

== Schedule ==
Date	Opponent	Site	Result	Attendance	Source
September 24	at Trinity (TX)*	Yoakum Field; Waxahachie, TX	W 26–0		
October 2	Southwestern (TX)*	Kyle Field; College Station, TX	W 35–0		
October 9	vs. Sewanee*	Fair Park Stadium; Dallas, TX	W 6–3		
October 16	New Mexico*	Kyle Field; College Station, TX	W 63–0		
October 23	at SMU	Fair Park Stadium; Dallas, TX	L 7–9	20,000	
October 30	at Baylor	Cotton Palace; Waco, TX (rivalry)	L 9–20		
November 5	TCU	Kyle Field; College Station, TX (rivalry)	T 13–13	5,000	
November 12	Rice	Kyle Field; College Station, TX	W 20–0		
November 25	at Texas	War Memorial Stadium; Austin, TX (rivalry)	L 5–14		
*Non-conference game
