= Rebsamen =

Rebsamen is a surname. Notable people with the surname include:

- François Rebsamen (born 1951), French politician
- Paul Rebsamen (1905–1947), American football player
- Rahel Rebsamen (born 1994), Swiss bobsledder
