= 1926 Baylor Bears football team =

American college football season

1926 Baylor Bears football
- Conference: Southwest Conference
- Record: 6–3–1 (3–1–1 SWC)
- Head coach: Morley Jennings (1st season)
- Captain: George Morris
- Home stadium: Carroll Field; Cotton Palace

1926 Southwest Conference football standings
	Conf.					Overall
Team	W		L		T	W		L		T
SMU $	5	–	0	–	0	8	–	0	–	1
Baylor	3	–	1	–	1	6	–	3	–	1
TCU	1	–	1	–	2	6	–	1	–	2
Texas	2	–	2	–	0	5	–	4	–	0
Arkansas	2	–	2	–	0	5	–	5	–	0
Texas A&M	1	–	3	–	1	5	–	3	–	1
Rice	0	–	4	–	0	4	–	4	–	1
$ – Conference champion; Arkansas's games against Ole Miss, Centenary, and LSU counted in the conference standings.

The 1926 Baylor Bears football team represented Baylor University in the Southwest Conference (SWC) during the 1926 college football season. In their first season under head coach Morley Jennings, the Bears compiled a 6–3–1 record (3–1–1 against conference opponents), finished in second place in the conference, and outscored opponents by a combined total of 103 to 93. They played their home games at Carroll Field and the Cotton Palace in Waco, Texas. George Morris was the team captain.

== Schedule ==
Date	Opponent	Site	Result	Source
September 25	Southwestern (TX)*	Carroll Field; Waco, TX	W 7–0	
October 2	at Loyola (LA)*	Loyola Stadium; New Orleans, LA	L 10–13	
October 12	vs. TCU	Fair Park Stadium; Dallas, TX (rivalry)	T 7–7	
October 16	Trinity (TX)*	Carroll Field; Waco, TX	W 14–0	
October 23	Howard Payne*	Cotton Palace; Waco, TX	W 23–7	
October 30	Texas A&M^{†}	Cotton Palace; Waco, TX (rivalry)	W 20–9	
November 6	Texas	Cotton Palace; Waco, TX (rivalry)	W 10–7	
November 13	at SMU	Ownby Stadium; University Park, TX	L 3–31	
November 18	St. Edward's*	Carroll Field; Waco, TX	L 0–12	
November 25	at Rice	Rice Field; Houston, TX	W 9–7	
*Non-conference game; ^{†}Homecoming
