= 1926 Rice Owls football team =

American college football season

1926 Rice Owls football
- Conference: Southwest Conference
- Record: 4–4–1 (0–4 SWC)
- Head coach: John Heisman (3rd season)
- Home stadium: Rice Field

1926 Southwest Conference football standings
| | Conf. | | | | | Overall |
| Team | W | | L | | T | W | | L | | T |
|---|---|---|---|---|---|---|---|---|---|---|
| SMU $ | 5 | – | 0 | – | 0 | 8 | – | 0 | – | 1 |
| Baylor | 3 | – | 1 | – | 1 | 6 | – | 3 | – | 1 |
| TCU | 1 | – | 1 | – | 2 | 6 | – | 1 | – | 2 |
| Texas | 2 | – | 2 | – | 0 | 5 | – | 4 | – | 0 |
| Arkansas | 2 | – | 2 | – | 0 | 5 | – | 5 | – | 0 |
| Texas A&M | 1 | – | 3 | – | 1 | 5 | – | 3 | – | 1 |
| Rice | 0 | – | 4 | – | 0 | 4 | – | 4 | – | 1 |
$ – Conference champion; Arkansas's games against Ole Miss, Centenary, and LSU counted in the conference standings.

The 1926 Rice Owls football team was an American football team that represented Rice Institute as a member of the Southwest Conference (SWC) during the 1926 college football season. In its third season under head coach John Heisman, the team compiled a 4–4–1 record (0–4 against SWC opponents) and outscored opponents by a total of 84 to 81.

== Schedule ==
| Date | Opponent | Site | Result | Source |
|---|---|---|---|---|
| September 25 | Stephen F. Austin* | Rice Field; Houston, TX | W 25–0 | |
| October 2 | Sam Houston State* | Rice Field; Houston, TX | W 20–0 | |
| October 9 | Trinity (TX)* | Rice Field; Houston, TX | T 6–6 | |
| October 16 | St. Edward's* | Rice Field; Houston, TX | W 19–0 | |
| October 23 | Texas | Rice Field; Houston, TX | L 0–20 | |
| October 30 | Southwestern (TX)* | Rice Field; Houston, TX | W 7–6 | |
| November 6 | SMU | Rice Field; Houston, TX | L 0–20 | |
| November 12 | at Texas A&M | Kyle Field; College Station, TX | L 0–20 | |
| November 25 | Baylor | Rice Field; Houston, TX | L 7–9 | |
*Non-conference game
