= 1926 Texas Longhorns football team =

American college football season

1926 Texas Longhorns football
- Conference: Southwest Conference
- Record: 5–4 (2–2 SWC)
- Head coach: E. J. Stewart (4th season)
- Captain: Mack Saxon
- Home stadium: War Memorial Stadium

1926 Southwest Conference football standings
	Conf.					Overall
Team	W		L		T	W		L		T
SMU $	5	–	0	–	0	8	–	0	–	1
Baylor	3	–	1	–	1	6	–	3	–	1
TCU	1	–	1	–	2	6	–	1	–	2
Texas	2	–	2	–	0	5	–	4	–	0
Arkansas	2	–	2	–	0	5	–	5	–	0
Texas A&M	1	–	3	–	1	5	–	3	–	1
Rice	0	–	4	–	0	4	–	4	–	1
$ – Conference champion; Arkansas's games against Ole Miss, Centenary, and LSU counted in the conference standings.

The 1926 Texas Longhorns football team was an American football team that represented the University of Texas (now known as the University of Texas at Austin) as a member of the Southwest Conference (SWC) during the 1926 college football season. In their fourth year under head coach E. J. Stewart, the Longhorns compiled an overall record of 5–4, with a mark of 2–2 in conference play, and finished tied for fourth in the SWC.

== Schedule ==
Date	Opponent	Site	Result	Source
September 25	Southwestern State (OK)*	War Memorial Stadium; Austin, TX	W 31–7	
October 2	at Kansas State*	Memorial Stadium; Manhattan, KS	L 3–13	
October 9	Phillips*	War Memorial Stadium; Austin, TX	W 27–0	
October 16	vs. Vanderbilt*	Fair Park Stadium; Dallas, TX	L 0–7	
October 23	at Rice	Rice Field; Houston, TX (rivalry)	W 20–0	
October 30	SMU	War Memorial Stadium; Austin, TX	L 17–21	
November 6	at Baylor	Cotton Palace; Waco, TX (rivalry)	L 7–10	
November 11	Southwestern (TX)*	War Memorial Stadium; Austin, TX	W 27–6	
November 25	Texas A&M	War Memorial Stadium; Austin, TX (rivalry)	W 14–5	
*Non-conference game
