= 1926 Oklahoma A&M Cowboys football team =

American college football season

1926 Oklahoma A&M Cowboys football

MVC champion
- Conference: Missouri Valley Conference
- Record: 3–4–1 (3–0–1 MVC)
- Head coach: John Maulbetsch (6th season)
- Home stadium: Lewis Field

1926 Missouri Valley Conference football standings
	Conf.					Overall
Team	W		L		T	W		L		T
Oklahoma A&M $	3	–	0	–	1	3	–	4	–	1
Nebraska	5	–	1	–	0	6	–	2	–	0
Missouri	4	–	1	–	0	5	–	1	–	2
Grinnell	3	–	1	–	1	6	–	1	–	1
Oklahoma	3	–	2	–	1	5	–	2	–	1
Kansas State	2	–	2	–	0	5	–	3	–	0
Iowa State	3	–	3	–	1	4	–	3	–	1
Drake	1	–	4	–	0	2	–	6	–	0
Kansas	1	–	5	–	0	2	–	6	–	0
Washington University	0	–	6	–	0	1	–	7	–	0
$ – Conference champion

The 1926 Oklahoma A&M Cowboys football team represented Oklahoma A&M College—now known as Oklahoma State University–Stillwater—as a member of the Missouri Valley Conference during the 1926 college football season. Led by sixth-year head coach John Maulbetsch, the Cowboys compiled an overall record of 3–4–1 with a mark of 3–0–1in conference play, winning the MVC title. Oklahoma A&M played home games at Lewis Field in Stillwater, Oklahoma.

== Schedule ==
Date	Opponent	Site	Result	Attendance	Source
October 2	at Michigan*	Ferry Field; Ann Arbor, MI	L 3–42	18,000	
October 9	at Iowa State	State Field; Ames, IA	W 13–0		
October 16	at Tulsa*	Tulsa, OK (rivalry)	L 0–28		
October 23	at TCU*	Clark Field; Fort Worth, TX	L 0–3		
November 6	Washington University	Lewis Field; Stillwater, OK	W 37–3		
November 13	Grinnell	Lewis Field; Stillwater, OK	W 10–0		
November 19	vs. Arkansas*	Lewis Field; Stillwater, OK	L 2–24		
November 25	Oklahoma^{†}	Lewis Field; Stillwater, OK (Bedlam)	T 14–14		
*Non-conference game; ^{†}Homecoming
