= 1926 Southwestern Louisiana Bulldogs football team =

American college football season

1926 Southwestern Louisiana Bulldogs football
- Conference: Southern Intercollegiate Athletic Association
- Record: 6–3–1 (2–2 SIAA)
- Head coach: T. R. Mobley (8th season)
- Home stadium: Campus Athletic Field

1926 Southern Intercollegiate Athletic Association football standings
	Conf.					Overall
Team	W		L		T	W		L		T
Centenary +	5	–	0	–	0	5	–	3	–	0
Chattanooga +	4	–	0	–	2	6	–	2	–	2
Presbyterian	5	–	1	–	0	7	–	2	–	0
Furman	3	–	1	–	1	8	–	1	–	1
Stetson	3	–	1	–	0	5	–	1	–	1
Georgetown (KY)	3	–	1	–	1	6	–	2	–	1
Louisiana Tech	3	–	1	–	0	5	–	2	–	2
Birmingham–Southern	3	–	1	–	2	5	–	3	–	2
Mercer	3	–	1	–	1	4	–	3	–	2
Mississippi College	5	–	2	–	0	6	–	3	–	0
Louisville	2	–	1	–	0	6	–	2	–	0
Centre	2	–	1	–	2	3	–	4	–	2
The Citadel	5	–	3	–	0	7	–	3	–	0
SW Louisiana	2	–	2	–	0	6	–	3	–	1
Transylvania	1	–	1	–	0	4	–	3	–	0
Southern College	2	–	2	–	0	4	–	4	–	0
Oglethorpe	3	–	4	–	1	3	–	7	–	1
Howard (AL)	2	–	3	–	1	4	–	4	–	1
Western Kentucky State Normal	1	–	2	–	1	4	–	4	–	1
Newberry	2	–	4	–	0	2	–	5	–	0
Millsaps	2	–	6	–	0	2	–	8	–	0
Wofford	1	–	3	–	0	2	–	8	–	0
Union (TN)	1	–	4	–	0	3	–	6	–	0
Louisiana College	0	–	4	–	0	3	–	5	–	0
Kentucky Wesleyan	0	–	4	–	0	3	–	6	–	0
Erskine	0	–	4	–	0	1	–	7	–	0
Rollins	0	–	4	–	0	0	–	6	–	0
+ – Conference co-champions

The 1926 Southwestern Louisiana Bulldogs football team was an American football team that represented the Southwestern Louisiana Institute of Liberal and Technical Learning (now known as the University of Louisiana at Lafayette) in the Southern Intercollegiate Athletic Association during the 1926 college football season. In their eighth year under head coach T. R. Mobley, the team compiled a 6–3–1 record.

== Schedule ==
Date	Opponent	Site	Result	Source
September 25	Mississippi State Teachers*	Campus Athletic Field; Lafayette, LA	W 33–6	
October 2	at LSU*	Tiger Stadium; Baton Rouge, LA	L 0–34	
October 9	at Millsaps	Athletic Field; Jackson, MS	L 0–12	
October 15	Sam Houston State*	Campus Athletic Field; Lafayette, LA	W 15–0	
October 23	South Park Junior College*	Campus Athletic Field; Lafayette, LA	W 19–0	
October 30	at Louisiana College	Alumni Field; Pineville, LA	W 33–7	
November 6	Louisiana Tech	Campus Athletic Field; Lafayette, LA (rivalry)	L 0–23	
November 12	Stephen F. Austin*	Campus Athletic Field; Lafayette, LA	W 33–0	
November 19	vs. Louisiana Normal*	City Park; Alexandria, LA	T 0–0	
November 25	Mississippi College	Campus Athletic Field; Lafayette, LA	W 20–16	
*Non-conference game
