= 1926 Oklahoma Sooners football team =

American college football season

1926 Oklahoma Sooners football
- Conference: Missouri Valley Conference
- Record: 5–2–1 (3–2–1 MVC)
- Head coach: Bennie Owen (22nd season)
- Offensive scheme: Single-wing
- Captain: Pollock Wallace
- Home stadium: Memorial Stadium

1926 Missouri Valley Conference football standings
| | Conf. | | | | | Overall |
| Team | W | | L | | T | W | | L | | T |
|---|---|---|---|---|---|---|---|---|---|---|
| Oklahoma A&M $ | 3 | – | 0 | – | 1 | 3 | – | 4 | – | 1 |
| Nebraska | 5 | – | 1 | – | 0 | 6 | – | 2 | – | 0 |
| Missouri | 4 | – | 1 | – | 0 | 5 | – | 1 | – | 2 |
| Grinnell | 3 | – | 1 | – | 1 | 6 | – | 1 | – | 1 |
| Oklahoma | 3 | – | 2 | – | 1 | 5 | – | 2 | – | 1 |
| Kansas State | 2 | – | 2 | – | 0 | 5 | – | 3 | – | 0 |
| Iowa State | 3 | – | 3 | – | 1 | 4 | – | 3 | – | 1 |
| Drake | 1 | – | 4 | – | 0 | 2 | – | 6 | – | 0 |
| Kansas | 1 | – | 5 | – | 0 | 2 | – | 6 | – | 0 |
| Washington University | 0 | – | 6 | – | 0 | 1 | – | 7 | – | 0 |
$ – Conference champion

The 1926 Oklahoma Sooners football team represented the University of Oklahoma as a member of the Missouri Valley Conference (MVC) during the 1926 college football season. In their 22nd and final season under head coach Bennie Owen, the Sooners compiled am overall record of 5–2–1 with a mark of 3–2–1 in conference play, placing fifth in the MVC, and outscored opponents by a combined total of 137 to 52.

No Sooners were recognized as All-Americans, but three Sooners received all-conference honors: end Roy LeCrone; back Frank Potts; and center Pollock Wallace.

== Schedule ==
| Date | Time | Opponent | Site | Result | Attendance | Source |
|---|---|---|---|---|---|---|
| October 9 | | Arkansas* | Memorial Stadium; Norman, OK | W 13–6 | | |
| October 16 | | at Drake | Drake Stadium; Des Moines, IA | W 11–0 | | |
| October 23 | | Kansas State | Memorial Stadium; Norman, OK | L 12–15 | | |
| October 30 | 2:30 p.m. | at Washington University | Francis Field; St. Louis, MO | W 21–0 | 7,500 | |
| November 6 | | Missouri | Memorial Stadium; Norman, OK (rivalry) | W 10–7 | | |
| November 13 | | at Kansas | Memorial Stadium; Lawrence, KS | L 9–10 | | |
| November 20 | | Saint Louis* | Memorial Stadium; Norman, OK | W 47–0 | | |
| November 25 | | at Oklahoma A&M | Lewis Field; Stillwater, OK (Bedlam) | T 14–14 | | |
*Non-conference game; All times are in Central time
