= Hugh E. Wilson =

American sports coach (1899–1962)

Biographical details
- Born: January 14, 1899; Ionia, Michigan, U.S.
- Died: April 6, 1962 (aged 63); Ann Arbor, Michigan, U.S.

Playing career

Football
- 1918–1921: Michigan
- Positions: Guard, tackle

Coaching career (HC unless noted)

Football
- 1926–1927: Louisiana Tech
- 1928–1929: Michigan State (assistant)

Basketball
- 1924–1925: LSU

Baseball
- 1927: Louisiana Tech

Head coaching record
- Overall: 8–7–2 (football); 10–7 (basketball); 7–8 (baseball)

Hugh Edward "Gob" Wilson II (January 14, 1899 – April 6, 1962) was an American college football and college baseball coach at Louisiana Tech University and a college basketball coach at Louisiana State University.

Wilson was an alumnus of the University of Michigan, where he played as a lineman for Hall of Fame Coach Fielding H. Yost's Michigan Wolverines football team from 1918 to 1921. He died in Ann Arbor, Michigan in 1962.

== Head coaching record ==
=== Football ===
Year	Team	Overall	Conference	Standing	Bowl/playoffs
Louisiana Tech Bulldogs (Southern Intercollegiate Athletic Association) (1926–1927)
1926	Louisiana Tech	5–2–2	3–1	T–4th	
1927	Louisiana Tech	3–5	1–3		
Louisiana Tech:		8–7–2	4–4		
Total:		8–7–2			

=== Basketball ===
Record table
Season	Team	Overall	Conference	Standing	Postseason
LSU Tigers (Southern Conference) (1924–1925)
1924–25	LSU	10–7	1–4		
LSU:		10–7 (.588)	1–4 (.200)		
Total:		10–7 (.588)			

=== Baseball ===
Record table
Season	Team	Overall	Conference	Standing	Postseason
Louisiana Tech Bulldogs (Southern Intercollegiate Athletic Association) (1927)
1927	Louisiana Tech	7–8			
Louisiana Tech:		7–8			
Total:		7–8			
