= 1926 Washington University Bears football team =

American college football season

1926 Washington University Bears football
- Conference: Missouri Valley Conference
- Record: 1–7 (0–6 MVC)
- Head coach: Bob Higgins (2nd season)
- Home stadium: Francis Field

1926 Missouri Valley Conference football standings
	Conf.					Overall
Team	W		L		T	W		L		T
Oklahoma A&M $	3	–	0	–	1	3	–	4	–	1
Nebraska	5	–	1	–	0	6	–	2	–	0
Missouri	4	–	1	–	0	5	–	1	–	2
Grinnell	3	–	1	–	1	6	–	1	–	1
Oklahoma	3	–	2	–	1	5	–	2	–	1
Kansas State	2	–	2	–	0	5	–	3	–	0
Iowa State	3	–	3	–	1	4	–	3	–	1
Drake	1	–	4	–	0	2	–	6	–	0
Kansas	1	–	5	–	0	2	–	6	–	0
Washington University	0	–	6	–	0	1	–	7	–	0
$ – Conference champion

The 1926 Washington University Bears football team represented Washington University in St. Louis as a member of the Missouri Valley Conference (MVC) during the 1926 college football season. Led by second-year head coach Bob Higgins, the Bears compiled an overall record of 1–7 with a mark of 0–6 in conference play, placing last out of ten teams in the MVC. Washington University played home games at Francis Field in St. Louis.

== Schedule ==
Date	Time	Opponent	Site	Result	Attendance	Source
October 4		Iowa State	Francis Field; St. Louis, MO	L 0–6		
October 9	2:30 p.m.	Missouri Mines*	Francis Field; St. Louis, MO	W 25–2	5,000	
October 16	2:30 p.m.	Nebraska*	Francis Field; St. Louis, MO	L 6–20	8,000–8,500	
October 23		at Grinnell	Grinnell, IA	L 0–7		
October 30	2:30 p.m.	Oklahoma^{†}	Francis Field; St. Louis, MO	L 0–21	7,500	
November 6		at Oklahoma A&M	Lewis Field; Stillwater, OK	L 3–37		
November 13		at Missouri	Memorial Stadium; Columbia, MO	L 6–45		
November 25	2:30 p.m.	Quantico Marines*	Francis Field; St. Louis, MO	L 0–13	7,500	
*Non-conference game; ^{†}Homecoming; All times are in Central time
