= Morley Jennings =

American athlete, coach, and administrator (1890–1985)

Biographical details
- Born: January 23, 1890; Holland, Michigan, U.S.
- Died: May 13, 1985 (aged 95); Lubbock, Texas, U.S.

Playing career

Football
- 1910–1911: Mississippi State

Coaching career (HC unless noted)

Football
- 1912–1925: Ouachita Baptist
- 1926–1940: Baylor

Baseball
- 1929–1938: Baylor

Administrative career (AD unless noted)
- 1941–1951: Texas Tech

Head coaching record
- Overall: 153–77–18 (football); 120–79 (baseball)
- College Football Hall of Fame; Inducted in 1973 (profile)

Baseball career
- Second baseman
- Batted: Right Threw: Right

MLB debut
- September 8, 1913, for the Washington Senators

Last MLB appearance
- September 9, 1913, for the Washington Senators

MLB statistics
- Batting average: .000
- At bats: 3
- Hits: 0
- Stats at Baseball Reference

Teams
- Washington Senators (1913)

William Morley "Jopsey" Jennings (January 23, 1890 – May 13, 1985) was an American football, basketball, and baseball player, coach, and college athletics administrator.

== Biography ==
Jennings attended college at Mississippi State University in Starkville, at which he participated in baseball, basketball, football, and track. Jennings served from 1912 to 1925 as the head football coach at Ouachita Baptist University in Arkadelphia, Arkansas, and then at Baylor University in Waco, Texas, from 1926 to 1940. He compiled a career college football record of 153–77–18. He was also the head baseball coach at Baylor from 1928 to 1939, where he tallied a mark of 120–79. From 1941 to 1951, Jennings served as the athletic director at Texas Tech University in Lubbock. He was inducted into the College Football Hall of Fame as a coach in 1973.

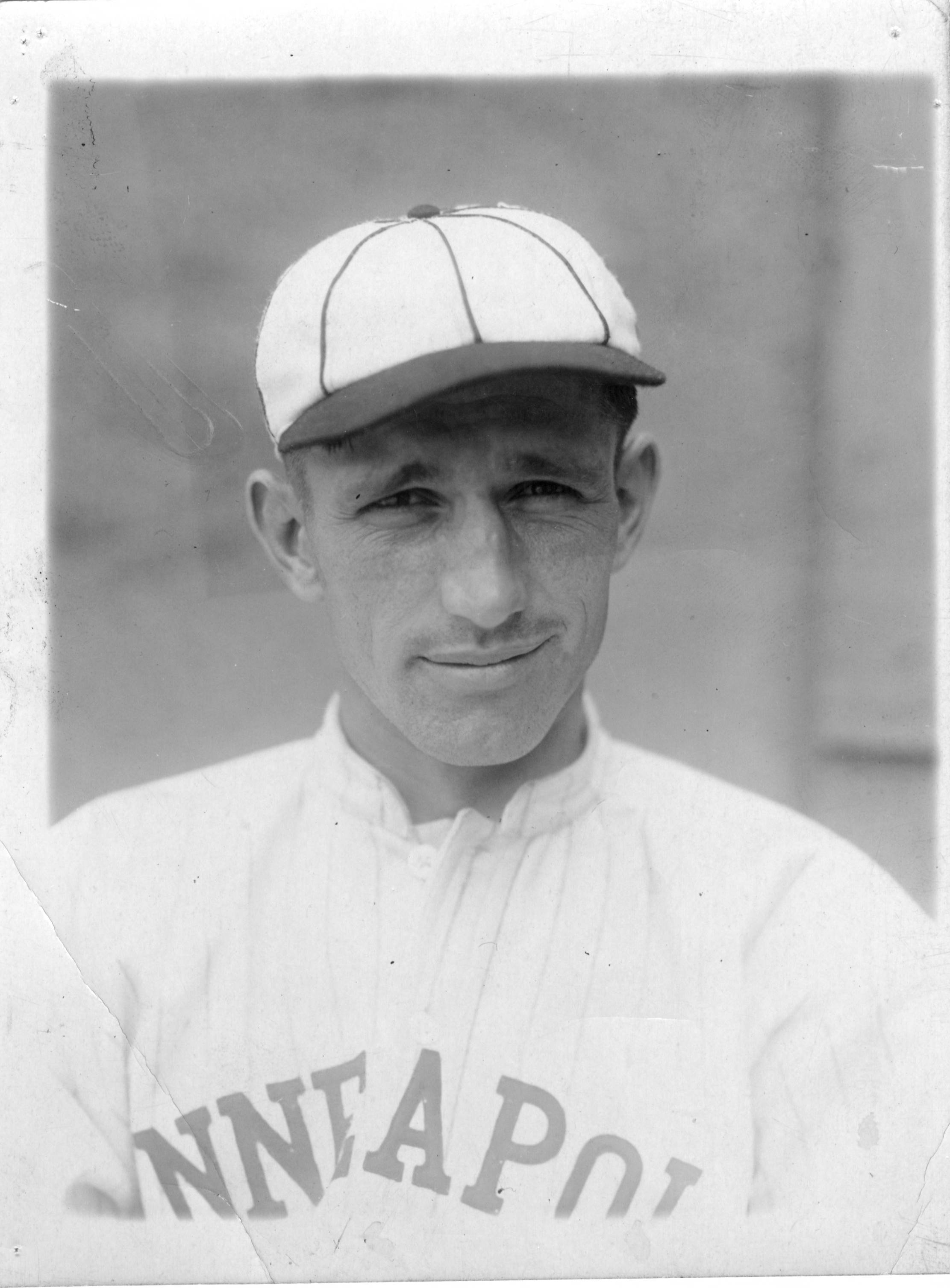
Jennings with the Minneapolis Millers minor league team, ca. 1920

Jennings was also a Major League Baseball second baseman. He played in two games for the Washington Senators in 1913, going 0-for-3.

Jennings and his wife, Elizabeth, had one son, Richard Autrey Jennings (1917–2019), who was born while the couple lived in Arkadelphia. In 1942, Richard Jennings obtained his Juris Doctor from George Washington Law School in Washington, D.C., where he worked on Capitol Hill for Texas U.S. Senator Tom Connally and operated an elevator in the Capitol. He subsequently practiced law in Lubbock for seventy-six years before moving to Corinth in Denton County, Texas, in his later years.

== Head coaching record ==
=== Football ===
| Year | Team | Overall | Conference | Standing | Bowl/playoffs |
|---|---|---|---|---|---|
Ouachita Baptist Tigers (Independent) (1912–1925)
| 1912 | Ouachita Baptist | 2–2–1 | | | |
| 1913 | Ouachita Baptist | 3–2–3 | | | |
| 1914 | Ouachita Baptist | 8–0–1 | | | |
| 1915 | Ouachita Baptist | 7–1 | | | |
| 1916 | Ouachita Baptist | 4–2 | | | |
| 1917 | Ouachita Baptist | 4–0 | | | |
| 1918 | Ouachita Baptist | 2–1 | | | |
| 1919 | Ouachita Baptist | 4–1–1 | | | |
| 1920 | Ouachita Baptist | 6–1–1 | | | |
| 1921 | Ouachita Baptist | 5–3 | | | |
| 1922 | Ouachita Baptist | 6–1–1 | | | |
| 1923 | Ouachita Baptist | 4–3–1 | | | |
| 1924 | Ouachita Baptist | 8–0–1 | | | |
| 1925 | Ouachita Baptist | 7–0–2 | | | |
| Ouachita Baptist: | | 70–17–12 | | | |
Baylor Bears (Southwest Conference) (1926–1940)
| 1926 | Baylor | 6–3–1 | 3–1–1 | 2nd | |
| 1927 | Baylor | 2–7 | 0–5 | 7th | |
| 1928 | Baylor | 8–2 | 3–2 | T–3rd | |
| 1929 | Baylor | 7–3–1 | 2–2–1 | 3rd | |
| 1930 | Baylor | 6–3–1 | 3–1–1 | 2nd | |
| 1931 | Baylor | 3–6 | 1–5 | 6th | |
| 1932 | Baylor | 3–5–1 | 1–3–1 | 5th | |
| 1933 | Baylor | 6–4 | 4–2 | T–2nd | |
| 1934 | Baylor | 3–7 | 1–5 | 7th | |
| 1935 | Baylor | 8–3 | 3–3 | T–3rd | |
| 1936 | Baylor | 6–3–1 | 3–2–1 | T–3rd | |
| 1937 | Baylor | 7–3 | 3–3 | 4th | |
| 1938 | Baylor | 7–2–1 | 3–2–1 | 3rd | |
| 1939 | Baylor | 7–3 | 4–2 | T–2nd | |
| 1940 | Baylor | 4–6 | 0–6 | 7th | |
| Baylor: | | 83–60–6 | 33–44–6 | | |
| Total: | | 153–77–18 | | | |
