= 1926 Arkansas Razorbacks football team =

American college football season

1926 Arkansas Razorbacks football
- Conference: Southwest Conference
- Record: 5–5 (2–2 SWC)
- Head coach: Francis Schmidt (5th season)
- Captain: Herman Boozman
- Home stadium: The Hill

1926 Southwest Conference football standings
	Conf.					Overall
Team	W		L		T	W		L		T
SMU $	5	–	0	–	0	8	–	0	–	1
Baylor	3	–	1	–	1	6	–	3	–	1
TCU	1	–	1	–	2	6	–	1	–	2
Texas	2	–	2	–	0	5	–	4	–	0
Arkansas	2	–	2	–	0	5	–	5	–	0
Texas A&M	1	–	3	–	1	5	–	3	–	1
Rice	0	–	4	–	0	4	–	4	–	1
$ – Conference champion; Arkansas's games against Ole Miss, Centenary, and LSU counted in the conference standings.

The 1926 Arkansas Razorbacks football team represented the University of Arkansas in the Southwest Conference (SWC) during the 1926 college football season. In their fifth year under head coach Francis Schmidt, the Razorbacks compiled an overall record of 5–5 record with a mark of 2–2 in conference play, placing in a three-way tie for third in the SWC. Arkansas's games against Ole Miss, Centenary, and LSU counted in the conference standings. The Razorbacks outscored all opponents by a combined total of 179 to 88.

== Schedule ==
Date	Opponent	Site	Result	Source
September 25	Arkansas State Teachers*	The Hill; Fayetteville, AR	W 60–0	
October 2	Ole Miss^	The Hill; Fayetteville, AR (rivalry)	W 21–6	
October 9	at Oklahoma*	Oklahoma Memorial Stadium; Norman, OK	L 6–13	
October 16	Hendrix*	Kavanaugh Field; Little Rock, AR	W 14–7	
October 23	Centenary^	The Hill; Fayetteville, AR	W 33–6	
October 30	at Kansas State*	Memorial Stadium; Manhattan, KS	L 7–16	
November 6	vs. LSU^	State Fair Stadium; Shreveport, LA (rivalry)	L 0–14	
November 12	TCU^{†}	The Hill; Fayetteville, AR	L 7–10	
November 19	at Oklahoma A&M*	Lewis Field; Stillwater, OK	W 24–2	
November 25	at Tulsa*	McNulty Park; Tulsa, OK	L 7–14	
*Non-conference game; ^{†}Homecoming

^ indicates a designated conference game.
