= 1926 Chattanooga Moccasins football team =

American college football season

1926 Chattanooga Moccasins football

SIAA co-champion
- Conference: Southern Intercollegiate Athletic Association
- Record: 6–2–2 (4–0–2 SIAA)
- Head coach: Frank Thomas (2nd season)
- Captain: Austin Smith
- Home stadium: Chamberlain Field

1926 Southern Intercollegiate Athletic Association football standings
	Conf.					Overall
Team	W		L		T	W		L		T
Centenary +	5	–	0	–	0	5	–	3	–	0
Chattanooga +	4	–	0	–	2	6	–	2	–	2
Presbyterian	5	–	1	–	0	7	–	2	–	0
Furman	3	–	1	–	1	8	–	1	–	1
Stetson	3	–	1	–	0	5	–	1	–	1
Georgetown (KY)	3	–	1	–	1	6	–	2	–	1
Louisiana Tech	3	–	1	–	0	5	–	2	–	2
Birmingham–Southern	3	–	1	–	2	5	–	3	–	2
Mercer	3	–	1	–	1	4	–	3	–	2
Mississippi College	5	–	2	–	0	6	–	3	–	0
Louisville	2	–	1	–	0	6	–	2	–	0
Centre	2	–	1	–	2	3	–	4	–	2
The Citadel	5	–	3	–	0	7	–	3	–	0
SW Louisiana	2	–	2	–	0	6	–	3	–	1
Transylvania	1	–	1	–	0	4	–	3	–	0
Southern College	2	–	2	–	0	4	–	4	–	0
Oglethorpe	3	–	4	–	1	3	–	7	–	1
Howard (AL)	2	–	3	–	1	4	–	4	–	1
Western Kentucky State Normal	1	–	2	–	1	4	–	4	–	1
Newberry	2	–	4	–	0	2	–	5	–	0
Millsaps	2	–	6	–	0	2	–	8	–	0
Wofford	1	–	3	–	0	2	–	8	–	0
Union (TN)	1	–	4	–	0	3	–	6	–	0
Louisiana College	0	–	4	–	0	3	–	5	–	0
Kentucky Wesleyan	0	–	4	–	0	3	–	6	–	0
Erskine	0	–	4	–	0	1	–	7	–	0
Rollins	0	–	4	–	0	0	–	6	–	0
+ – Conference co-champions

The 1926 Chattanooga Moccasins football team represented the University of Chattanooga as a member of the Southern Intercollegiate Athletic Association (SIAA) during the 1926 college football season. The team tied for the SIAA championship. Frank Thomas was head coach.

== Schedule ==
Date	Opponent	Site	Result	Source
September 25	at Auburn*	Drake Field; Auburn, AL	L 6–15	
October 2	Jacksonville State*	Chamberlain Field; Chattanooga, TN	W 71–3	
October 9	at The Citadel	College Park Stadium; Charleston, SC	W 6–3	
October 16	Oglethorpe	Chamberlain Field; Chattanooga, TN	T 14–14	
October 23	Birmingham–Southern	Chamberlain Field; Chattanooga, TN	T 7–7	
October 30	Emory and Henry*	Chamberlain Field; Chattanooga, TN	W 60–0	
November 6	Howard (AL)	Chamberlain Field; Chattanooga, TN	W 23–0	
November 13	Georgetown (KY)	Chamberlain Field; Chattanooga, TN	W 61–0	
November 25	Union (TN)	Chamberlain Field; Chattanooga, TN	W 24–0	
December 4	William & Mary*	Chamberlain Field; Chattanooga, TN	L 6–9	
*Non-conference game
