= 1926 Iowa State Cyclones football team =

American college football season

1926 Iowa State Cyclones football
- Conference: Missouri Valley Conference
- Record: 4–3–1 (3–3–1 MVC)
- Head coach: C. Noel Workman (1st season)
- Captain: Roland "Bud" Coe
- Home stadium: State Field

1926 Missouri Valley Conference football standings
	Conf.					Overall
Team	W		L		T	W		L		T
Oklahoma A&M $	3	–	0	–	1	3	–	4	–	1
Nebraska	5	–	1	–	0	6	–	2	–	0
Missouri	4	–	1	–	0	5	–	1	–	2
Grinnell	3	–	1	–	1	6	–	1	–	1
Oklahoma	3	–	2	–	1	5	–	2	–	1
Kansas State	2	–	2	–	0	5	–	3	–	0
Iowa State	3	–	3	–	1	4	–	3	–	1
Drake	1	–	4	–	0	2	–	6	–	0
Kansas	1	–	5	–	0	2	–	6	–	0
Washington University	0	–	6	–	0	1	–	7	–	0
$ – Conference champion

The 1926 Iowa State Cyclones football team represented Iowa State College of Agricultural and Mechanic Arts (later renamed Iowa State University) in the Missouri Valley Conference during the 1926 college football season. In their first season under head coach C. Noel Workman, the Cyclones compiled a 4–3–1 record (3–3–1 against conference opponents), finished in seventh place in the conference, and were outscored by opponents by a combined total of 60 to 51. They played their home games at State Field in Ames, Iowa.

Roland "Bud" Coe was the team captain. No Iowa State players were selected as first-team all-conference players.

The October 2 contest in St. Louis against Washington University was postponed to October 4 due to field conditions.

== Schedule ==
Date	Time	Opponent	Site	Result	Source
October 4	2:00 pm	at Washington University	Francis Field; St. Louis, MO	W 6–0	
October 9	2:30 pm	Oklahoma A&M	State Field; Ames, IA	L 0–13	
October 16	2:00 pm	at Grinnell	Ward Field; Grinnell, IA	T 0–0	
October 23	2:30 pm	Missouri	State Field; Ames, IA (rivalry)	L 3–7	
October 30	2:00 pm	at Nebraska	Memorial Stadium; Lincoln, NE (rivalry)	L 6–31	
November 13	2:00 pm	Drake^{†}	State Field; Ames, IA	W 13–7	
November 20	2:00 pm	at Kansas State	Memorial Stadium; Manhattan, KS (rivalry)	W 3–2	
November 27	4:00 pm	at Southern Branch*	Los Angeles Memorial Coliseum; Los Angeles, CA	W 20–0	
*Non-conference game; ^{†}Homecoming; All times are in Central time
