= 1926 Howard Bulldogs football team =

American college football season

1926 Howard Bulldogs football
- Conference: Southern Intercollegiate Athletic Association
- Record: 4–4–1 (2–3–1 SIAA)
- Head coach: Jenks Gillem (3rd season)
- Home stadium: Berry Field; Rickwood Field

1926 Southern Intercollegiate Athletic Association football standings
	Conf.					Overall
Team	W		L		T	W		L		T
Centenary +	5	–	0	–	0	5	–	3	–	0
Chattanooga +	4	–	0	–	2	6	–	2	–	2
Presbyterian	5	–	1	–	0	7	–	2	–	0
Furman	3	–	1	–	1	8	–	1	–	1
Stetson	3	–	1	–	0	5	–	1	–	1
Georgetown (KY)	3	–	1	–	1	6	–	2	–	1
Louisiana Tech	3	–	1	–	0	5	–	2	–	2
Birmingham–Southern	3	–	1	–	2	5	–	3	–	2
Mercer	3	–	1	–	1	4	–	3	–	2
Mississippi College	5	–	2	–	0	6	–	3	–	0
Louisville	2	–	1	–	0	6	–	2	–	0
Centre	2	–	1	–	2	3	–	4	–	2
The Citadel	5	–	3	–	0	7	–	3	–	0
SW Louisiana	2	–	2	–	0	6	–	3	–	1
Transylvania	1	–	1	–	0	4	–	3	–	0
Southern College	2	–	2	–	0	4	–	4	–	0
Oglethorpe	3	–	4	–	1	3	–	7	–	1
Howard (AL)	2	–	3	–	1	4	–	4	–	1
Western Kentucky State Normal	1	–	2	–	1	4	–	4	–	1
Newberry	2	–	4	–	0	2	–	5	–	0
Millsaps	2	–	6	–	0	2	–	8	–	0
Wofford	1	–	3	–	0	2	–	8	–	0
Union (TN)	1	–	4	–	0	3	–	6	–	0
Louisiana College	0	–	4	–	0	3	–	5	–	0
Kentucky Wesleyan	0	–	4	–	0	3	–	6	–	0
Erskine	0	–	4	–	0	1	–	7	–	0
Rollins	0	–	4	–	0	0	–	6	–	0
+ – Conference co-champions

The 1926 Howard Bulldogs football team was an American football team that represented Howard College, now known as the Samford University, as a member of the Southern Intercollegiate Athletic Association (SIAA) during the 1926 college football season. In their third year under head coach Jenks Gillem, the team compiled a 4–4–1 record.

== Schedule ==
Date	Opponent	Site	Result	Attendance	Source
September 24	Marion*	Berry Field; Birmingham, AL	W 7–0		
October 2	Oglethorpe	Rickwood Field; Birmingham, AL	W 23–0		
October 9	Auburn*	Rickwood Field; Birmingham, AL	L 14–33		
October 15	vs. Jacksonville State*	Anniston, AL (rivalry)	W 13–0		
October 23	at Mercer	Centennial Stadium; Macon, GA	L 0–3	7,000	
October 30	Mississippi College	Rickwood Field; Birmingham, AL	L 10–23	2,000	
November 6	at Chattanooga	Chamberlain Field; Chattanooga, TN	L 0–23		
November 20	vs. Birmingham–Southern	Rickwood Field; Birmingham, AL	T 7–7		
November 25	at Millsaps	State Fairgrounds; Jackson, MS	W 13–7		
*Non-conference game
