= 1926 Mississippi College Choctaws football team =

American college football season

1926 Mississippi College Choctaws football
- Conference: Southern Intercollegiate Athletic Association
- Record: 6–3 (5–2 SIAA)
- Head coach: George Bohler (4th season)
- Home stadium: Provine Field

1926 Southern Intercollegiate Athletic Association football standings
	Conf.					Overall
Team	W		L		T	W		L		T
Centenary +	5	–	0	–	0	5	–	3	–	0
Chattanooga +	4	–	0	–	2	6	–	2	–	2
Presbyterian	5	–	1	–	0	7	–	2	–	0
Furman	3	–	1	–	1	8	–	1	–	1
Stetson	3	–	1	–	0	5	–	1	–	1
Georgetown (KY)	3	–	1	–	1	6	–	2	–	1
Louisiana Tech	3	–	1	–	0	5	–	2	–	2
Birmingham–Southern	3	–	1	–	2	5	–	3	–	2
Mercer	3	–	1	–	1	4	–	3	–	2
Mississippi College	5	–	2	–	0	6	–	3	–	0
Louisville	2	–	1	–	0	6	–	2	–	0
Centre	2	–	1	–	2	3	–	4	–	2
The Citadel	5	–	3	–	0	7	–	3	–	0
SW Louisiana	2	–	2	–	0	6	–	3	–	1
Transylvania	1	–	1	–	0	4	–	3	–	0
Southern College	2	–	2	–	0	4	–	4	–	0
Oglethorpe	3	–	4	–	1	3	–	7	–	1
Howard (AL)	2	–	3	–	1	4	–	4	–	1
Western Kentucky State Normal	1	–	2	–	1	4	–	4	–	1
Newberry	2	–	4	–	0	2	–	5	–	0
Millsaps	2	–	6	–	0	2	–	8	–	0
Wofford	1	–	3	–	0	2	–	8	–	0
Union (TN)	1	–	4	–	0	3	–	6	–	0
Louisiana College	0	–	4	–	0	3	–	5	–	0
Kentucky Wesleyan	0	–	4	–	0	3	–	6	–	0
Erskine	0	–	4	–	0	1	–	7	–	0
Rollins	0	–	4	–	0	0	–	6	–	0
+ – Conference co-champions

The 1926 Mississippi College Choctaws football team was an American football team that represented Mississippi College as a member of the Southern Intercollegiate Athletic Association (SIAA) during the 1926 college football season. Led by George Bohler in his fourth season as head coach, the team compiled an overall record of 6–3, with a mark of 5–2 against SIAA competition.

== Schedule ==
Date	Opponent	Site	Result	Source
September 25	Clarke College (MS)*	Provine Field; Clinton, MS	W 23–0	
October 2	at Mississippi A&M*	Scott Field; Starkville, MS	L 0–41	
October 16	at Centenary	Centenary Field; Shreveport, LA	L 14–28	
October 22	vs. Millsaps	State Fairgrounds; Jackson, MS (rivalry)	W 43–13	
October 30	at Howard (AL)	Rickwood Field; Birmingham, AL	W 23–10	
November 5	Birmingham–Southern	Provine Field; Clinton, MS	W 26–14	
November 11	at Union (TN)	West Tennessee Fairgrounds; Jackson, TN	W 21–7	
November 19	Louisiana College	Provine Field; Clinton, MS	W 40–14	
November 25	at Southwestern Louisiana	Campus Athletic Field; Lafayette, LA	L 16–20	
*Non-conference game
