= 1926 Kansas Jayhawks football team =

American college football season

1926 Kansas Jayhawks football
- Conference: Missouri Valley Conference
- Record: 2–6 (1–5 MVC)
- Head coach: Franklin Cappon (1st season)
- Captain: Harold Zuber
- Home stadium: Memorial Stadium

1926 Missouri Valley Conference football standings
	Conf.					Overall
Team	W		L		T	W		L		T
Oklahoma A&M $	3	–	0	–	1	3	–	4	–	1
Nebraska	5	–	1	–	0	6	–	2	–	0
Missouri	4	–	1	–	0	5	–	1	–	2
Grinnell	3	–	1	–	1	6	–	1	–	1
Oklahoma	3	–	2	–	1	5	–	2	–	1
Kansas State	2	–	2	–	0	5	–	3	–	0
Iowa State	3	–	3	–	1	4	–	3	–	1
Drake	1	–	4	–	0	2	–	6	–	0
Kansas	1	–	5	–	0	2	–	6	–	0
Washington University	0	–	6	–	0	1	–	7	–	0
$ – Conference champion

The 1926 Kansas Jayhawks football team represented the University of Kansas in the Missouri Valley Conference during the 1926 college football season. In their first season under head coach Franklin Cappon, the Jayhawks compiled a 2–6 record (1–5 against conference opponents), finished in ninth place in the conference, and were outscored by opponents by a combined total of 135 to 34. They played their home games at Memorial Stadium in Lawrence, Kansas. Harold Zuber was the team captain.

== Schedule ==
Date	Opponent	Site	Result	Source
October 2	Washburn*	Memorial Stadium; Lawrence, KS	W 14–6	
October 9	at Wisconsin*	Camp Randall Stadium; Madison, WI	L 0–13	
October 16	at Kansas State	Ahearn Field; Manhattan, KS (rivalry)	L 0–27	
October 23	Nebraska^{†}	Memorial Stadium; Lawrence, KS (rivalry)	L 3–20	
October 30	at Drake	Drake Stadium; Des Moines, IA	L 0–13	
November 6	Grinnell	Memorial Stadium; Lawrence, KS	L 7–32	
November 11	Oklahoma	Memorial Stadium; Lawrence, KS	W 10–9	
November 20	at Missouri	Memorial Stadium; Columbia, MO (rivalry)	L 0–15	
*Non-conference game; ^{†}Homecoming
