= 1926 Western Kentucky State Normal Hilltoppers football team =

American college football season

1926 Western Kentucky State Normal Hilltoppers football
- Conference: Southern Intercollegiate Athletic Association
- Record: 4–4–1 (1–2–1 SIAA)
- Head coach: Edgar Diddle (5th season)
- Captain: Ual Killebrew
- Home stadium: Ogden Stadium

1926 Southern Intercollegiate Athletic Association football standings
	Conf.					Overall
Team	W		L		T	W		L		T
Centenary +	5	–	0	–	0	5	–	3	–	0
Chattanooga +	4	–	0	–	2	6	–	2	–	2
Presbyterian	5	–	1	–	0	7	–	2	–	0
Furman	3	–	1	–	1	8	–	1	–	1
Stetson	3	–	1	–	0	5	–	1	–	1
Georgetown (KY)	3	–	1	–	1	6	–	2	–	1
Louisiana Tech	3	–	1	–	0	5	–	2	–	2
Birmingham–Southern	3	–	1	–	2	5	–	3	–	2
Mercer	3	–	1	–	1	4	–	3	–	2
Mississippi College	5	–	2	–	0	6	–	3	–	0
Louisville	2	–	1	–	0	6	–	2	–	0
Centre	2	–	1	–	2	3	–	4	–	2
The Citadel	5	–	3	–	0	7	–	3	–	0
SW Louisiana	2	–	2	–	0	6	–	3	–	1
Transylvania	1	–	1	–	0	4	–	3	–	0
Southern College	2	–	2	–	0	4	–	4	–	0
Oglethorpe	3	–	4	–	1	3	–	7	–	1
Howard (AL)	2	–	3	–	1	4	–	4	–	1
Western Kentucky State Normal	1	–	2	–	1	4	–	4	–	1
Newberry	2	–	4	–	0	2	–	5	–	0
Millsaps	2	–	6	–	0	2	–	8	–	0
Wofford	1	–	3	–	0	2	–	8	–	0
Union (TN)	1	–	4	–	0	3	–	6	–	0
Louisiana College	0	–	4	–	0	3	–	5	–	0
Kentucky Wesleyan	0	–	4	–	0	3	–	6	–	0
Erskine	0	–	4	–	0	1	–	7	–	0
Rollins	0	–	4	–	0	0	–	6	–	0
+ – Conference co-champions

The 1926 Western Kentucky State Normal Hilltoppers football team represented Western Kentucky State Normal School and Teachers College (now known as Western Kentucky University) as a member of the Southern Intercollegiate Athletic Association during the 1926 college football season. They were coached by Edgar Diddle in his fifth year.

== Schedule ==
Date	Opponent	Site	Result	Source
September 25	Centre	Bowling Green, KY	T 0–0	
October 3	Bethel (TN)	Bowling Green, KY	W 21–6	
October 16	Western State Normal	Ogden Stadium; Bowling Green, KY	L 2–3	
October 23	Lambuth	Bowling Green, KY	W 29–13	
October 30	Kentucky Wesleyan	Bowling Green, KY	W 22–0	
November 6	at Louisville	Louisville, KY	L 10–26	
November 13	Transylvania	Bowling Green, KY	L 3–7	
November 20	Evansville	Bowling Green, KY	W 61–0	
November 27	Ozarks	Bowling Green, KY	L 3–14	
