= 1926 Millsaps Majors football team =

American college football season

1926 Millsaps Majors football
- Conference: Southern Intercollegiate Athletic Association
- Record: 2–8 (2–6 SIAA)
- Head coach: Herman F. Zimoski (5th season)

1926 Southern Intercollegiate Athletic Association football standings
	Conf.					Overall
Team	W		L		T	W		L		T
Centenary +	5	–	0	–	0	5	–	3	–	0
Chattanooga +	4	–	0	–	2	6	–	2	–	2
Presbyterian	5	–	1	–	0	7	–	2	–	0
Furman	3	–	1	–	1	8	–	1	–	1
Stetson	3	–	1	–	0	5	–	1	–	1
Georgetown (KY)	3	–	1	–	1	6	–	2	–	1
Louisiana Tech	3	–	1	–	0	5	–	2	–	2
Birmingham–Southern	3	–	1	–	2	5	–	3	–	2
Mercer	3	–	1	–	1	4	–	3	–	2
Mississippi College	5	–	2	–	0	6	–	3	–	0
Louisville	2	–	1	–	0	6	–	2	–	0
Centre	2	–	1	–	2	3	–	4	–	2
The Citadel	5	–	3	–	0	7	–	3	–	0
SW Louisiana	2	–	2	–	0	6	–	3	–	1
Transylvania	1	–	1	–	0	4	–	3	–	0
Southern College	2	–	2	–	0	4	–	4	–	0
Oglethorpe	3	–	4	–	1	3	–	7	–	1
Howard (AL)	2	–	3	–	1	4	–	4	–	1
Western Kentucky State Normal	1	–	2	–	1	4	–	4	–	1
Newberry	2	–	4	–	0	2	–	5	–	0
Millsaps	2	–	6	–	0	2	–	8	–	0
Wofford	1	–	3	–	0	2	–	8	–	0
Union (TN)	1	–	4	–	0	3	–	6	–	0
Louisiana College	0	–	4	–	0	3	–	5	–	0
Kentucky Wesleyan	0	–	4	–	0	3	–	6	–	0
Erskine	0	–	4	–	0	1	–	7	–	0
Rollins	0	–	4	–	0	0	–	6	–	0
+ – Conference co-champions

The 1926 Millsaps Majors football team was an American football team that represented Millsaps College as a member of the Southern Intercollegiate Athletic Association (SIAA) during the 1926 college football season. In their fifth year under head coach Herman F. Zimoski, the team compiled a 2–8 record.

== Schedule ==
Date	Opponent	Site	Result	Attendance	Source
September 24	at Alabama*	Denny Field; Tuscaloosa, AL	L 0–54	4,000	
October 2	Union (TN)	Fairgrounds; Jackson, MS	L 19–20		
October 9	Southwestern Louisiana	Athletic Field; Jackson, MS	W 12–0		
October 16	at Mississippi A&M*	Scott Field; Starkville, MS	L 0–34		
October 22	vs. Mississippi College	Jackson, MS (rivalry)	L 13–43		
October 30	Louisiana Tech	Jackson, MS	L 7–13		
November 7	Louisiana College	Jackson, MS	W 35–7		
November 12	at Birmingham–Southern	Munger Bowl; Birmingham, AL	L 0–41		
November 20	at Centenary	Centenary Field; Shreveport, LA	L 0–34	2,000	
November 25	Howard (AL)	Jackson, MS	L 7–13		
*Non-conference game
