= 1926 Birmingham–Southern Panthers football team =

American college football season

1926 Birmingham–Southern Panthers football
- Conference: Southern Intercollegiate Athletic Association
- Record: 5–3–2 (3–1–2 SIAA)
- Head coach: Harold Drew (3rd season)
- Home stadium: Munger Bowl

1926 Southern Intercollegiate Athletic Association football standings
	Conf.					Overall
Team	W		L		T	W		L		T
Centenary +	5	–	0	–	0	5	–	3	–	0
Chattanooga +	4	–	0	–	2	6	–	2	–	2
Presbyterian	5	–	1	–	0	7	–	2	–	0
Furman	3	–	1	–	1	8	–	1	–	1
Stetson	3	–	1	–	0	5	–	1	–	1
Georgetown (KY)	3	–	1	–	1	6	–	2	–	1
Louisiana Tech	3	–	1	–	0	5	–	2	–	2
Birmingham–Southern	3	–	1	–	2	5	–	3	–	2
Mercer	3	–	1	–	1	4	–	3	–	2
Mississippi College	5	–	2	–	0	6	–	3	–	0
Louisville	2	–	1	–	0	6	–	2	–	0
Centre	2	–	1	–	2	3	–	4	–	2
The Citadel	5	–	3	–	0	7	–	3	–	0
SW Louisiana	2	–	2	–	0	6	–	3	–	1
Transylvania	1	–	1	–	0	4	–	3	–	0
Southern College	2	–	2	–	0	4	–	4	–	0
Oglethorpe	3	–	4	–	1	3	–	7	–	1
Howard (AL)	2	–	3	–	1	4	–	4	–	1
Western Kentucky State Normal	1	–	2	–	1	4	–	4	–	1
Newberry	2	–	4	–	0	2	–	5	–	0
Millsaps	2	–	6	–	0	2	–	8	–	0
Wofford	1	–	3	–	0	2	–	8	–	0
Union (TN)	1	–	4	–	0	3	–	6	–	0
Louisiana College	0	–	4	–	0	3	–	5	–	0
Kentucky Wesleyan	0	–	4	–	0	3	–	6	–	0
Erskine	0	–	4	–	0	1	–	7	–	0
Rollins	0	–	4	–	0	0	–	6	–	0
+ – Conference co-champions

The 1926 Birmingham–Southern Panthers football team was an American football team that represented Birmingham–Southern College as a member of the Southern Intercollegiate Athletic Association during the 1926 college football season. In their third season under head coach Harold Drew, the team compiled a 5–3–2 record.

== Schedule ==
Date	Opponent	Site	Result	Source
September 25	Mississippi A&M*	Munger Bowl; Birmingham, AL	L 7–19	
October 1	at Marion*	Marion, AL	W 27–6	
October 9	at Southwestern (TN)*	Memphis, TN	L 14–16	
October 16	Southern College	Munger Bowl; Birmingham, AL	W 26–13	
October 23	at Chattanooga	Chamberlain Field; Chattanooga, TN	T 7–7	
October 29	vs. Jacksonville State*	Gadsden, AL	W 29–6	
November 5	at Mississippi College	Provine Field; Clinton, MS	L 14–26	
November 12	Millsaps	Munger Bowl; Birmingham, AL	W 41–0	
November 20	vs. Howard (AL)	Rickwood Field; Birmingham, AL	T 7–7	
November 25	at Rollins	Fairgrounds; Orlando, FL	W 33–0	
*Non-conference game
