= 1926 Louisville Cardinals football team =

American college football season

1926 Louisville Cardinals football
- Conference: Southern Intercollegiate Athletic Association
- Record: 6–2 (2–1 SIAA)
- Head coach: Tom King (2nd season)

1926 Southern Intercollegiate Athletic Association football standings
	Conf.					Overall
Team	W		L		T	W		L		T
Centenary +	5	–	0	–	0	5	–	3	–	0
Chattanooga +	4	–	0	–	2	6	–	2	–	2
Presbyterian	5	–	1	–	0	7	–	2	–	0
Furman	3	–	1	–	1	8	–	1	–	1
Stetson	3	–	1	–	0	5	–	1	–	1
Georgetown (KY)	3	–	1	–	1	6	–	2	–	1
Louisiana Tech	3	–	1	–	0	5	–	2	–	2
Birmingham–Southern	3	–	1	–	2	5	–	3	–	2
Mercer	3	–	1	–	1	4	–	3	–	2
Mississippi College	5	–	2	–	0	6	–	3	–	0
Louisville	2	–	1	–	0	6	–	2	–	0
Centre	2	–	1	–	2	3	–	4	–	2
The Citadel	5	–	3	–	0	7	–	3	–	0
SW Louisiana	2	–	2	–	0	6	–	3	–	1
Transylvania	1	–	1	–	0	4	–	3	–	0
Southern College	2	–	2	–	0	4	–	4	–	0
Oglethorpe	3	–	4	–	1	3	–	7	–	1
Howard (AL)	2	–	3	–	1	4	–	4	–	1
Western Kentucky State Normal	1	–	2	–	1	4	–	4	–	1
Newberry	2	–	4	–	0	2	–	5	–	0
Millsaps	2	–	6	–	0	2	–	8	–	0
Wofford	1	–	3	–	0	2	–	8	–	0
Union (TN)	1	–	4	–	0	3	–	6	–	0
Louisiana College	0	–	4	–	0	3	–	5	–	0
Kentucky Wesleyan	0	–	4	–	0	3	–	6	–	0
Erskine	0	–	4	–	0	1	–	7	–	0
Rollins	0	–	4	–	0	0	–	6	–	0
+ – Conference co-champions

The 1926 Louisville Cardinals football team was an American football team that represented the University of Louisville as a member of the Southern Intercollegiate Athletic Association (SIAA) during the 1926 college football season. In their second season under head coach Tom King, the Cardinals compiled a 6–2 record.

== Schedule ==
Date	Opponent	Site	Result	Source
October 2	at Ogden*	Bowling Green, KY	W 79–0	
October 9	Rose Poly*	Louisville, KY	W 49–0	
October 16	at St. Xavier*	Corcoran Field; Cincinnati, OH	L 7–20	
October 30	Centre	Louisville, KY	L 0–6	
November 6	Western Kentucky State Normal*	Louisville, KY	W 26–10	
November 13	at Kentucky Wesleyan	Owensboro, KY	W 25–12	
November 20	Marshall*	Louisville, KY	W 27–3	
November 25	at Southern College	Lakeland, FL	W 13–3	
*Non-conference game
