= 1926 The Citadel Bulldogs football team =

American college football season

1926 The Citadel Bulldogs football
- Conference: Southern Intercollegiate Athletic Association
- Record: 7–3 (5–3 SIAA)
- Head coach: Carl Prause (5th season)
- Home stadium: College Park Stadium

1926 Southern Intercollegiate Athletic Association football standings
	Conf.					Overall
Team	W		L		T	W		L		T
Centenary +	5	–	0	–	0	5	–	3	–	0
Chattanooga +	4	–	0	–	2	6	–	2	–	2
Presbyterian	5	–	1	–	0	7	–	2	–	0
Furman	3	–	1	–	1	8	–	1	–	1
Stetson	3	–	1	–	0	5	–	1	–	1
Georgetown (KY)	3	–	1	–	1	6	–	2	–	1
Louisiana Tech	3	–	1	–	0	5	–	2	–	2
Birmingham–Southern	3	–	1	–	2	5	–	3	–	2
Mercer	3	–	1	–	1	4	–	3	–	2
Mississippi College	5	–	2	–	0	6	–	3	–	0
Louisville	2	–	1	–	0	6	–	2	–	0
Centre	2	–	1	–	2	3	–	4	–	2
The Citadel	5	–	3	–	0	7	–	3	–	0
SW Louisiana	2	–	2	–	0	6	–	3	–	1
Transylvania	1	–	1	–	0	4	–	3	–	0
Southern College	2	–	2	–	0	4	–	4	–	0
Oglethorpe	3	–	4	–	1	3	–	7	–	1
Howard (AL)	2	–	3	–	1	4	–	4	–	1
Western Kentucky State Normal	1	–	2	–	1	4	–	4	–	1
Newberry	2	–	4	–	0	2	–	5	–	0
Millsaps	2	–	6	–	0	2	–	8	–	0
Wofford	1	–	3	–	0	2	–	8	–	0
Union (TN)	1	–	4	–	0	3	–	6	–	0
Louisiana College	0	–	4	–	0	3	–	5	–	0
Kentucky Wesleyan	0	–	4	–	0	3	–	6	–	0
Erskine	0	–	4	–	0	1	–	7	–	0
Rollins	0	–	4	–	0	0	–	6	–	0
+ – Conference co-champions

The 1926 The Citadel Bulldogs football team represented The Citadel, The Military College of South Carolina as a member of the Southern Intercollegiate Athletic Association (SIAA) the 1926 college football season. Carl Prause served as head coach for the fifth season. The Bulldogs played as members of the Southern Intercollegiate Athletic Association and played home games at College Park Stadium in Hampton Park.

== Schedule ==
Date	Opponent	Site	Result	Source
September 25	Stetson	College Park Stadium; Charleston, SC	W 14–7	
October 2	at Mercer	Centennial Stadium; Macon, GA	W 12–7	
October 9	Chattanooga	College Park Stadium; Charleston, SC	L 3–6	
October 16	Newberry	College Park Stadium; Charleston, SC	W 27–0	
October 23	at Wofford	Snyder Field; Spartanburg, SC (rivalry)	W 6–0	
October 28	vs. South Carolina*	County Fairgrounds; Orangeburg, SC	W 12–9	
November 6	Oglethorpe	College Park Stadium; Charleston, SC	W 10–0	
November 13	at Clemson*	Riggs Field; Calhoun, SC	W 15–6	
November 20	Furman	College Park Stadium; Charleston, SC (rivalry)	L 0–7	
November 25	Presbyterian	College Park Stadium; Charleston, SC	L 0–9	
*Non-conference game
