= 1926 Drake Bulldogs football team =

American college football season

1926 Drake Bulldogs football
- Conference: Missouri Valley Conference
- Record: 2–6 (1–4 MVC)
- Head coach: Ossie Solem (6th season)
- Home stadium: Drake Stadium

1926 Missouri Valley Conference football standings
	Conf.					Overall
Team	W		L		T	W		L		T
Oklahoma A&M $	3	–	0	–	1	3	–	4	–	1
Nebraska	5	–	1	–	0	6	–	2	–	0
Missouri	4	–	1	–	0	5	–	1	–	2
Grinnell	3	–	1	–	1	6	–	1	–	1
Oklahoma	3	–	2	–	1	5	–	2	–	1
Kansas State	2	–	2	–	0	5	–	3	–	0
Iowa State	3	–	3	–	1	4	–	3	–	1
Drake	1	–	4	–	0	2	–	6	–	0
Kansas	1	–	5	–	0	2	–	6	–	0
Washington University	0	–	6	–	0	1	–	7	–	0
$ – Conference champion

The 1926 Drake Bulldogs football team was an American football team that represented Drake University as a member of the Missouri Valley Conference (MVC) during the 1926 college football season. In their sixth season under head coach Ossie Solem, the Bulldogs compiled a 2–6 record (1–4 against MVC opponents), finished in eighth place out of ten teams in the MVC, and were outscored by a total of 118 to 60.

== Schedule ==
Date	Opponent	Site	Result	Attendance	Source
October 2	at Nebraska	Memorial Stadium; Lincoln, NE	L 0–21		
October 9	at Navy*	Thompson Stadium; Annapolis, MD	L 7–24		
October 16	Oklahoma	Drake Stadium; Des Moines, IA	L 0–11		
October 23	Ole Miss*	Drake Stadium; Des Moines, IA	W 33–15		
October 30	Kansas	Drake Stadium; Des Moines, IA	W 13–0		
November 13	at Iowa State	State Field; Ames, IA	L 7–13		
November 20	at Notre Dame*	Cartier Field; Notre Dame, IN	L 0–21	15,000	
November 25	at Grinnell	Grinnell, IA	L 0–13		
*Non-conference game
