= 1926 Kansas State Wildcats football team =

American college football season

1926 Kansas State Wildcats football
- Conference: Missouri Valley Conference
- Record: 5–3 (2–2 MVC)
- Head coach: Charlie Bachman (7th season)
- Offensive scheme: Notre Dame Box
- Home stadium: Memorial Stadium

1926 Missouri Valley Conference football standings
	Conf.					Overall
Team	W		L		T	W		L		T
Oklahoma A&M $	3	–	0	–	1	3	–	4	–	1
Nebraska	5	–	1	–	0	6	–	2	–	0
Missouri	4	–	1	–	0	5	–	1	–	2
Grinnell	3	–	1	–	1	6	–	1	–	1
Oklahoma	3	–	2	–	1	5	–	2	–	1
Kansas State	2	–	2	–	0	5	–	3	–	0
Iowa State	3	–	3	–	1	4	–	3	–	1
Drake	1	–	4	–	0	2	–	6	–	0
Kansas	1	–	5	–	0	2	–	6	–	0
Washington University	0	–	6	–	0	1	–	7	–	0
$ – Conference champion

The 1926 Kansas State Agricultural College Wildcats football team represented Kansas State Agricultural College in the 1926 college football season.

== Schedule ==
Date	Opponent	Site	Result	Source
October 2	Texas*	Memorial Stadium; Manhattan, KS	W 13–3	
October 9	at Creighton*	Creighton Stadium; Omaha, NE	W 12–0	
October 16	Kansas^{†}	Memorial Stadium; Manhattan, KS (rivalry)	W 27–0	
October 23	at Oklahoma	Oklahoma Memorial Stadium; Norman, OK	W 15–12	
October 30	Arkansas*	Memorial Stadium; Manhattan, KS	W 16–7	
November 6	at Marquette*	Marquette Stadium; Milwaukee, WI	L 0–14	
November 13	at Nebraska	Memorial Stadium; Lincoln, NE (rivalry)	L 0–3	
November 20	Iowa State	Memorial Stadium; Manhattan, KS (rivalry)	L 2–3	
*Non-conference game; ^{†}Homecoming
