= 1926 SMU Mustangs football team =

American college football season

1926 SMU Mustangs football

SWC champion
- Conference: Southwest Conference
- Record: 8–0–1 (5–0 SWC)
- Head coach: Ray Morrison (7th season)
- Captains: Stanley Dawson; Howard Wade
- Home stadium: Ownby Stadium, Fair Park Stadium

1926 Southwest Conference football standings
	Conf.					Overall
Team	W		L		T	W		L		T
SMU $	5	–	0	–	0	8	–	0	–	1
Baylor	3	–	1	–	1	6	–	3	–	1
TCU	1	–	1	–	2	6	–	1	–	2
Texas	2	–	2	–	0	5	–	4	–	0
Arkansas	2	–	2	–	0	5	–	5	–	0
Texas A&M	1	–	3	–	1	5	–	3	–	1
Rice	0	–	4	–	0	4	–	4	–	1
$ – Conference champion; Arkansas's games against Ole Miss, Centenary, and LSU counted in the conference standings.

The 1926 SMU Mustangs football team was an American football team that represented the Southern Methodist University (SMU) as a member of the Southwest Conference (SWC) during the 1926 college football season. In its seventh season under head coach Ray Morrison, the team compiled an 8–0–1 record, winning the SWC title. The Mustangs outscored opponents by a total of 229 to 47.

Coach Morrison brought the forward pass to the southwest during his time at SMU, using Gerald Mann as his passer.

== Schedule ==
Date	Opponent	Site	Result	Attendance	Source
September 24	North Texas State Teachers*	Ownby Stadium; University Park, TX (rivalry)	W 42–0		
October 2	Trinity (TX)*	Ownby Stadium; University Park, TX	W 48–0	8,000	
October 8	Centenary*	Ownby Stadium; University Park, TX	W 37–0		
October 16	at Missouri*	Memorial Stadium; Columbia, MO	T 7–7		
October 23	Texas A&M	Fair Park Stadium; Dallas, TX	W 9–7	20,000	
October 30	at Texas	War Memorial Stadium; Austin, TX	W 21-17		
November 6	at Rice	Rice Field; Houston, TX (rivalry)	W 20–0		
November 13	Baylor	Ownby Stadium; University Park, TX	W 31–3		
November 25	TCU	Ownby Stadium; University Park, TX (rivalry)	W 14–13	14,000	
*Non-conference game
