= 1926 TCU Horned Frogs football team =

American college football season

1926 TCU Horned Frogs football
- Conference: Southwest Conference
- Record: 6–1–2 (1–1–2 SWC)
- Head coach: Matty Bell (4th season)
- Home stadium: Clark Field

1926 Southwest Conference football standings
	Conf.					Overall
Team	W		L		T	W		L		T
SMU $	5	–	0	–	0	8	–	0	–	1
Baylor	3	–	1	–	1	6	–	3	–	1
TCU	1	–	1	–	2	6	–	1	–	2
Texas	2	–	2	–	0	5	–	4	–	0
Arkansas	2	–	2	–	0	5	–	5	–	0
Texas A&M	1	–	3	–	1	5	–	3	–	1
Rice	0	–	4	–	0	4	–	4	–	1
$ – Conference champion; Arkansas's games against Ole Miss, Centenary, and LSU counted in the conference standings.

The 1926 TCU Horned Frogs football team represented Texas Christian University (TCU) as a member the Southwest Conference (SWC) during the 1926 college football season. Led by fourth-year head coach Matty Bell, the Horned Frogs compiled and overall record of 6–1–2 overall with a mark of 1–1–2 in conference play, tying for third place. TCU played their home games at Clark Field, located on campus in Fort Worth, Texas.

== Schedule ==
Date	Opponent	Site	Result	Attendance	Source
September 25	Daniel Baker*	Clark Field; Fort Worth, TX	W 5–3		
October 2	Centenary*	Clark Field; Fort Worth, TX	W 24–14		
October 12	vs. Baylor	Fair Park Stadium; Dallas, TX (rivalry)	T 7–7		
October 16	Austin*	Clark Field; Fort Worth, TX	W 7–0		
October 23	Oklahoma A&M*	Clark Field; Fort Worth, TX	W 3–0		
October 30	Texas Tech*	Clark Field; Fort Worth, TX (rivalry)	W 28–16	5,000	
November 5	at Texas A&M	Kyle Field; College Station, TX (rivalry)	T 13–13	5,000	
November 12	at Arkansas	The Hill; Fayetteville, AR	W 10–7		
November 25	at SMU	Ownby Stadium; Dallas, TX (rivalry)	L 13–14	14,000	
*Non-conference game
