= 1926 Oglethorpe Stormy Petrels football team =

American college football season

1926 Oglethorpe Stormy Petrels football
- Conference: Southern Intercollegiate Athletic Association
- Record: 3–7–1 (3–4–1 SIAA)
- Head coach: Harry J. Robertson (3rd season)
- Home stadium: Spiller Field

1926 Southern Intercollegiate Athletic Association football standings
| | Conf. | | | | | Overall |
| Team | W | | L | | T | W | | L | | T |
|---|---|---|---|---|---|---|---|---|---|---|
| Centenary + | 5 | – | 0 | – | 0 | 5 | – | 3 | – | 0 |
| Chattanooga + | 4 | – | 0 | – | 2 | 6 | – | 2 | – | 2 |
| Presbyterian | 5 | – | 1 | – | 0 | 7 | – | 2 | – | 0 |
| Furman | 3 | – | 1 | – | 1 | 8 | – | 1 | – | 1 |
| Stetson | 3 | – | 1 | – | 0 | 5 | – | 1 | – | 1 |
| Georgetown (KY) | 3 | – | 1 | – | 1 | 6 | – | 2 | – | 1 |
| Louisiana Tech | 3 | – | 1 | – | 0 | 5 | – | 2 | – | 2 |
| Birmingham–Southern | 3 | – | 1 | – | 2 | 5 | – | 3 | – | 2 |
| Mercer | 3 | – | 1 | – | 1 | 4 | – | 3 | – | 2 |
| Mississippi College | 5 | – | 2 | – | 0 | 6 | – | 3 | – | 0 |
| Louisville | 2 | – | 1 | – | 0 | 6 | – | 2 | – | 0 |
| Centre | 2 | – | 1 | – | 2 | 3 | – | 4 | – | 2 |
| The Citadel | 5 | – | 3 | – | 0 | 7 | – | 3 | – | 0 |
| SW Louisiana | 2 | – | 2 | – | 0 | 6 | – | 3 | – | 1 |
| Transylvania | 1 | – | 1 | – | 0 | 4 | – | 3 | – | 0 |
| Southern College | 2 | – | 2 | – | 0 | 4 | – | 4 | – | 0 |
| Oglethorpe | 3 | – | 4 | – | 1 | 3 | – | 7 | – | 1 |
| Howard (AL) | 2 | – | 3 | – | 1 | 4 | – | 4 | – | 1 |
| Western Kentucky State Normal | 1 | – | 2 | – | 1 | 4 | – | 4 | – | 1 |
| Newberry | 2 | – | 4 | – | 0 | 2 | – | 5 | – | 0 |
| Millsaps | 2 | – | 6 | – | 0 | 2 | – | 8 | – | 0 |
| Wofford | 1 | – | 3 | – | 0 | 2 | – | 8 | – | 0 |
| Union (TN) | 1 | – | 4 | – | 0 | 3 | – | 6 | – | 0 |
| Louisiana College | 0 | – | 4 | – | 0 | 3 | – | 5 | – | 0 |
| Kentucky Wesleyan | 0 | – | 4 | – | 0 | 3 | – | 6 | – | 0 |
| Erskine | 0 | – | 4 | – | 0 | 1 | – | 7 | – | 0 |
| Rollins | 0 | – | 4 | – | 0 | 0 | – | 6 | – | 0 |
+ – Conference co-champions

The 1926 Oglethorpe Stormy Petrels football team represented Oglethorpe University as a member of the Southern Intercollegiate Athletic Association (SIAA) during the 1926 college football season. The highlight of the season was the 7 to 6 victory over Georgia Tech.

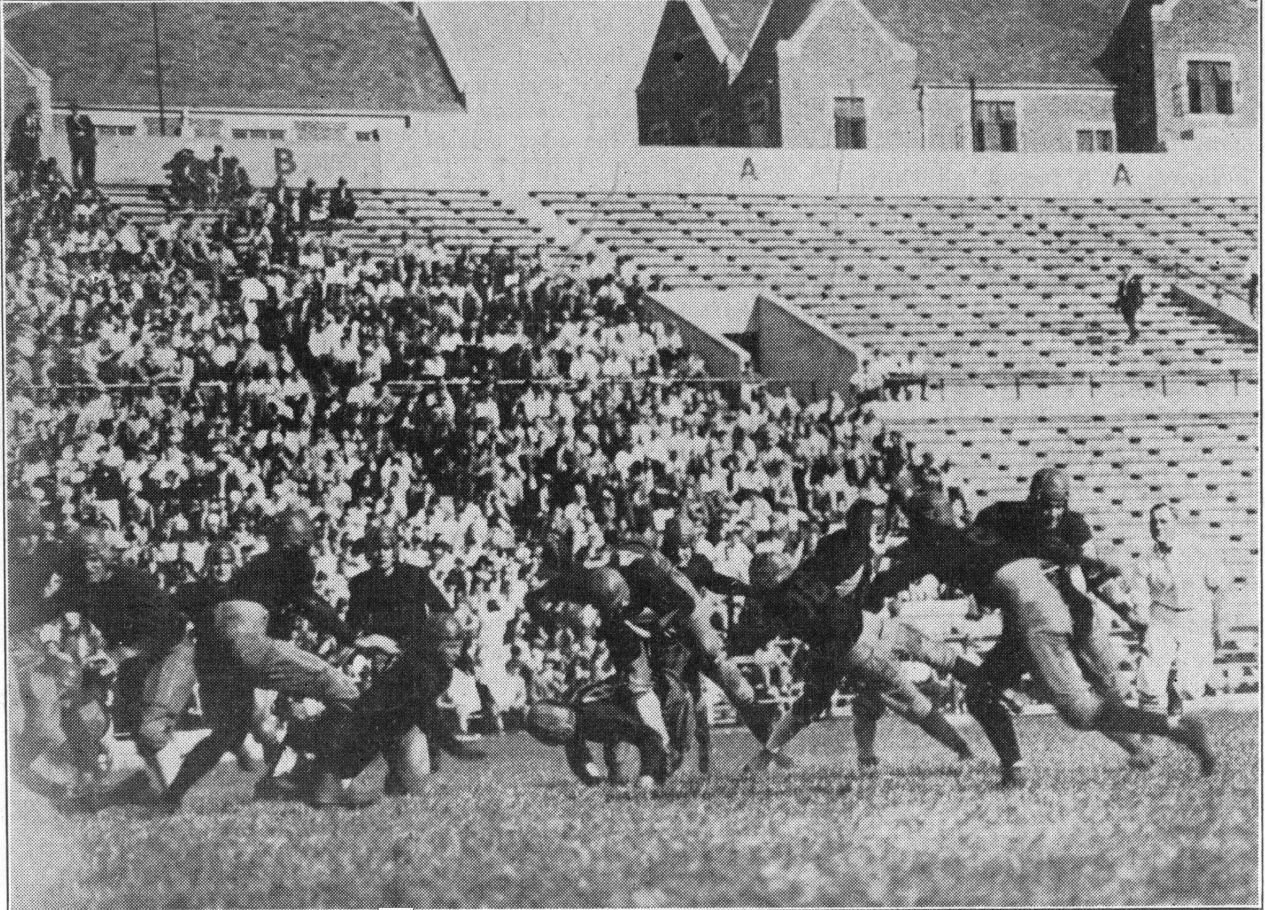
A scene from the Georgia Tech game

== Schedule ==
| Date | Time | Opponent | Site | Result | Attendance | Source |
|---|---|---|---|---|---|---|
| September 25 | | at Georgia Tech* | Grant Field; Atlanta, GA | W 7–6 | 10,000 | |
| October 2 | | at Howard (AL) | Rickwood Field; Birmingham, AL | L 0–23 | | |
| October 9 | | at Centre | Cheek Field; Danville, KY | W 12–0 | | |
| October 16 | | at Chattanooga | Chamberlain Field; Chattanooga, TN | T 14–14 | | |
| October 22 | | at Arkansas Tech* | Russellville, AR | L 0–26 | | |
| October 30 | 2:00 p.m. | Furman | Spiller Field; Atlanta, GA | W 12–11 | 3,000 | |
| November 6 | | at The Citadel | College Park Stadium; Charleston, SC | W 0–10 | | |
| November 20 | | Mercer | Spiller Field; Atlanta, GA | L 7–31 | | |
| November 25 | | at Centenary | Shreveport, LA | L 7–56 | 7,000 | |
| November 27 | | Presbyterian | Spiller Field; Atlanta, GA | L 13–18 | | |
| January 1 | | vs. Geneva* | Jacksonville, FL (Orange Blossom festival) | L 7–9 | 6,000 | |
*Non-conference game
