= 1926 Missouri Tigers football team =

American college football season

1926 Missouri Tigers football
- Conference: Missouri Valley Conference
- Record: 5–1–2 (4–1 MVC)
- Head coach: Gwinn Henry (4th season)
- Captain: Carl Bacchus
- Home stadium: Memorial Stadium

1926 Missouri Valley Conference football standings
	Conf.					Overall
Team	W		L		T	W		L		T
Oklahoma A&M $	3	–	0	–	1	3	–	4	–	1
Nebraska	5	–	1	–	0	6	–	2	–	0
Missouri	4	–	1	–	0	5	–	1	–	2
Grinnell	3	–	1	–	1	6	–	1	–	1
Oklahoma	3	–	2	–	1	5	–	2	–	1
Kansas State	2	–	2	–	0	5	–	3	–	0
Iowa State	3	–	3	–	1	4	–	3	–	1
Drake	1	–	4	–	0	2	–	6	–	0
Kansas	1	–	5	–	0	2	–	6	–	0
Washington University	0	–	6	–	0	1	–	7	–	0
$ – Conference champion

The 1926 Missouri Tigers football team was an American football team that represented the University of Missouri as a member of the Missouri Valley Conference (MVC) during the 1926 college football season. The team compiled an overall record of 5–1–2 with a mark of 4–1 against conference opponents, placed third in the MVC, and outscored all opponents by a combined total of 122 to 33. Gwinn Henry was the head coach for the fourth of nine seasons.

On October 2, 1926, the team played its first game at the new Memorial Stadium in Columbia, Missouri. The game, a scoreless tie with Tulane, was played in the rain before a crowd of 10,000 persons. The first Missouri touchdown at the new stadium was scored on October 16 on a pass from Emmett "Abe" Stuber to Bert Clark. The first Missouri victory in the new stadium was a 45–6 victory over Washington University on November 13.

== Schedule ==
Date	Opponent	Site	Result	Attendance	Source
October 2	Tulane*	Memorial Stadium; Columbia, MO	T 0–0	10,000	
October 9	at Nebraska	Memorial Stadium; Lincoln, NE (rivalry)	W 14–7		
October 16	SMU*	Memorial Stadium; Columbia, MO	T 7–7		
October 23	at Iowa State	State Field; Ames, IA (rivalry)	W 7–3		
October 30	at West Virginia*	Mountaineer Field; Morgantown, WV	W 27–0		
November 6	at Oklahoma	Memorial Stadium; Norman, OK (rivalry)	L 7–10		
November 13	Washington University	Memorial Stadium; Columbia, MO	W 45–6		
November 20	Kansas	Memorial Stadium; Columbia, MO (rivalry)	W 15–0		
*Non-conference game
