= 1926 Louisiana Tech Bulldogs football team =

American college football season

1926 Louisiana Tech Bulldogs football
- Conference: Southern Intercollegiate Athletic Association
- Record: 5–2–2 (3–1 SIAA)
- Head coach: Hugh E. Wilson (1st season)
- Captain: George B. Hogg
- Home stadium: Louisiana Tech Field

1926 Southern Intercollegiate Athletic Association football standings
	Conf.					Overall
Team	W		L		T	W		L		T
Centenary +	5	–	0	–	0	5	–	3	–	0
Chattanooga +	4	–	0	–	2	6	–	2	–	2
Presbyterian	5	–	1	–	0	7	–	2	–	0
Furman	3	–	1	–	1	8	–	1	–	1
Stetson	3	–	1	–	0	5	–	1	–	1
Georgetown (KY)	3	–	1	–	1	6	–	2	–	1
Louisiana Tech	3	–	1	–	0	5	–	2	–	2
Birmingham–Southern	3	–	1	–	2	5	–	3	–	2
Mercer	3	–	1	–	1	4	–	3	–	2
Mississippi College	5	–	2	–	0	6	–	3	–	0
Louisville	2	–	1	–	0	6	–	2	–	0
Centre	2	–	1	–	2	3	–	4	–	2
The Citadel	5	–	3	–	0	7	–	3	–	0
SW Louisiana	2	–	2	–	0	6	–	3	–	1
Transylvania	1	–	1	–	0	4	–	3	–	0
Southern College	2	–	2	–	0	4	–	4	–	0
Oglethorpe	3	–	4	–	1	3	–	7	–	1
Howard (AL)	2	–	3	–	1	4	–	4	–	1
Western Kentucky State Normal	1	–	2	–	1	4	–	4	–	1
Newberry	2	–	4	–	0	2	–	5	–	0
Millsaps	2	–	6	–	0	2	–	8	–	0
Wofford	1	–	3	–	0	2	–	8	–	0
Union (TN)	1	–	4	–	0	3	–	6	–	0
Louisiana College	0	–	4	–	0	3	–	5	–	0
Kentucky Wesleyan	0	–	4	–	0	3	–	6	–	0
Erskine	0	–	4	–	0	1	–	7	–	0
Rollins	0	–	4	–	0	0	–	6	–	0
+ – Conference co-champions

The 1926 Louisiana Tech Bulldogs football team was an American football team that represented the Louisiana Polytechnic Institute—now known as Louisiana Tech University—as a member of the Southern Intercollegiate Athletic Association (SIAA) during the 1926 college football season. Led by first-year head coach Hugh E. Wilson, Louisiana Tech compiled an overall record of 5–2–2. The team's captain was George B. Hogg.

== Schedule ==
Date	Time	Opponent	Site	Result	Attendance	Source
September 25		at Tulane*	New Orleans, LA	L 0–40	7,000	
October 2		Louisiana Normal*	Louisiana Tech Field; Ruston, LA (rivalry)	W 28–0		
October 16		Clarke College (MS)*	Louisiana Tech Field; Ruston, LA	W 36–0		
October 23	2:30 p.m.	Tennessee Docs*^{†}	Louisiana Tech Field; Ruston, LA	T 0–0		
October 30		at Millsaps	Jackson, MS	W 13–7		
November 6		at Southwestern Louisiana	Southwestern Stadium; Lafayette, LA (rivalry)	W 23–0		
November 11		at Centenary	Shreveport, LA	L 0–7	7,000	
November 19		Sam Houston State*	Louisiana Tech Field; Ruston, LA	T 6–6		
November 25		Louisiana College	Louisiana Tech Field; Ruston, LA	W 28–0		
*Non-conference game; ^{†}Homecoming; All times are in Central time
