= 1926 Mercer Bears football team =

American college football season

1926 Mercer Bears football
- Conference: Southern Intercollegiate Athletic Association
- Record: 4–3–2 (3–1–1 SIAA)
- Head coach: Bernie Moore (1st season)
- Home stadium: Centennial Stadium

1926 Southern Intercollegiate Athletic Association football standings
	Conf.					Overall
Team	W		L		T	W		L		T
Centenary +	5	–	0	–	0	5	–	3	–	0
Chattanooga +	4	–	0	–	2	6	–	2	–	2
Presbyterian	5	–	1	–	0	7	–	2	–	0
Furman	3	–	1	–	1	8	–	1	–	1
Stetson	3	–	1	–	0	5	–	1	–	1
Georgetown (KY)	3	–	1	–	1	6	–	2	–	1
Louisiana Tech	3	–	1	–	0	5	–	2	–	2
Birmingham–Southern	3	–	1	–	2	5	–	3	–	2
Mercer	3	–	1	–	1	4	–	3	–	2
Mississippi College	5	–	2	–	0	6	–	3	–	0
Louisville	2	–	1	–	0	6	–	2	–	0
Centre	2	–	1	–	2	3	–	4	–	2
The Citadel	5	–	3	–	0	7	–	3	–	0
SW Louisiana	2	–	2	–	0	6	–	3	–	1
Transylvania	1	–	1	–	0	4	–	3	–	0
Southern College	2	–	2	–	0	4	–	4	–	0
Oglethorpe	3	–	4	–	1	3	–	7	–	1
Howard (AL)	2	–	3	–	1	4	–	4	–	1
Western Kentucky State Normal	1	–	2	–	1	4	–	4	–	1
Newberry	2	–	4	–	0	2	–	5	–	0
Millsaps	2	–	6	–	0	2	–	8	–	0
Wofford	1	–	3	–	0	2	–	8	–	0
Union (TN)	1	–	4	–	0	3	–	6	–	0
Louisiana College	0	–	4	–	0	3	–	5	–	0
Kentucky Wesleyan	0	–	4	–	0	3	–	6	–	0
Erskine	0	–	4	–	0	1	–	7	–	0
Rollins	0	–	4	–	0	0	–	6	–	0
+ – Conference co-champions

The 1926 Mercer Bears football team was an American football team that represented Mercer University as a member of the Southern Intercollegiate Athletic Association (SIAA) during the 1926 college football season. In their first year under head coach Bernie Moore, the team compiled a 4–3–2 record.

== Schedule ==
Date	Opponent	Site	Result	Attendance	Source
September 25	at Georgia*	Sanford Field; Athens, GA	L 0–20	4,500	
October 2	The Citadel	Centennial Stadium; Macon, GA	L 7–12		
October 16	Florida*	Centennial Stadium; Macon, GA	W 6–3	6,000	
October 23	Howard (AL)	Centennial Stadium; Macon, GA	W 3–0	7,000	
October 30	at Fort Benning*	Columbus, GA	L 13–21		
November 6	at Furman	Manly Field; Greenville, SC	T 13–13		
November 11	at Rollins	Sanford, FL	W 55–0		
November 20	at Oglethorpe	Spiller Field; Atlanta, GA	W 31–7		
November 27	vs. Parris Island Marines*	Savannah, GA	T 0–0		
*Non-conference game
