= 1926 Nebraska Cornhuskers football team =

American college football season

1926 Nebraska Cornhuskers football
- Conference: Missouri Valley Conference
- Record: 6–2 (5–1 MVC)
- Head coach: Ernest Bearg (2nd season)
- Home stadium: Memorial Stadium

1926 Missouri Valley Conference football standings
| | Conf. | | | | | Overall |
| Team | W | | L | | T | W | | L | | T |
|---|---|---|---|---|---|---|---|---|---|---|
| Oklahoma A&M $ | 3 | – | 0 | – | 1 | 3 | – | 4 | – | 1 |
| Nebraska | 5 | – | 1 | – | 0 | 6 | – | 2 | – | 0 |
| Missouri | 4 | – | 1 | – | 0 | 5 | – | 1 | – | 2 |
| Grinnell | 3 | – | 1 | – | 1 | 6 | – | 1 | – | 1 |
| Oklahoma | 3 | – | 2 | – | 1 | 5 | – | 2 | – | 1 |
| Kansas State | 2 | – | 2 | – | 0 | 5 | – | 3 | – | 0 |
| Iowa State | 3 | – | 3 | – | 1 | 4 | – | 3 | – | 1 |
| Drake | 1 | – | 4 | – | 0 | 2 | – | 6 | – | 0 |
| Kansas | 1 | – | 5 | – | 0 | 2 | – | 6 | – | 0 |
| Washington University | 0 | – | 6 | – | 0 | 1 | – | 7 | – | 0 |
$ – Conference champion

The 1926 Nebraska Cornhuskers football team was an American football team that represented the University of Nebraska in the Missouri Valley Conference (MVC) during the 1926 college football season. In its second season under head coach Ernest Bearg, the team compiled a 6–2 record (5–1 against conference opponents), finished second in the MVC, and outscored opponents by a total of 123 to 46. The team played its home games at Memorial Stadium in Lincoln, Nebraska.

== Before the season ==
Coach Bearg started his second year with a substantially increased roster, up to 60 players from the 35 players on the 1925 roster. No specific game was recorded as the season's Homecoming game.

== Schedule ==
| Date | Time | Opponent | Site | Result | Attendance | Source |
|---|---|---|---|---|---|---|
| October 2 | 2:00 p.m. | Drake* | Memorial Stadium; Lincoln, NE | W 21–0 | | |
| October 9 | 2:00 p.m. | Missouri | Memorial Stadium; Lincoln, NE (rivalry) | L 7–14 | | |
| October 16 | 2:30 p.m. | at Washington University* | Francis Field; St. Louis, MO | W 20–6 | 8,000–8,500 | |
| October 23 | 2:00 p.m. | at Kansas | Memorial Stadium; Lawrence, KS (rivalry) | W 20–3 | | |
| October 30 | 2:00 p.m. | Iowa State | Memorial Stadium; Lincoln, NE (rivalry) | W 31–6 | | |
| November 13 | 2:00 p.m. | Kansas State | Memorial Stadium; Lincoln, NE (rivalry) | W 3–0 | | |
| November 20 | 2:00 p.m. | NYU* | Memorial Stadium; Lincoln, NE | W 15–7 | 15,000 | |
| November 25 | 3:30 p.m. | at Washington* | Husky Stadium; Seattle, WA | L 6–10 | 20,469 | |
*Non-conference game; All times are in Central time

== Roster ==
| Andrews, Ralph FB; Ashburn, Clifford E Ayres PLAYER; Beck, Victor FB; Betts PLAYER; Brant PLAYER; Brd PLAYER; Bronson, Willard QB; Brown, John QB; Burnham, Willard E Busby PLAYER; Carcoski PLAYER; Dailey, Frank HB; Drath, Walter G Durisch PLAYER; DuTeau G Fish PLAYER; Gates PLAYER; Grow, Lloyd C Hecht FB; Holm, Elmer G Holmes PLAYER; Hooper PLAYER; Howell, Edward FB; Hunt PLAYER; James, Theodore E Johnson PLAYER; Lawson, Vinton E Lee, Evard E Lindell, Don QB | Lucas, Leroy T Mandery, Avard HB; Mandery, Roy E Marrow, Wallace QB; McMullen, Dan G Mielenz, Frank HB; Molzen, Cecil G Morrison, Paul C Nimmo PLAYER; Oehlrich, Arnold FB; Peaker, Harold QB; Presnell, Glenn HB; Raish, Clarence LG; Randels, Ray T Reeves, Joe C Reller PLAYER; Schews PLAYER; Schulz, William G Shaner, George E Sprague, Leon E Staats PLAYER; Stephens, Robert QB; Stiner, Lonnie T Sturak PLAYER; Voris, Earl HB; Weir, Joe E Whitmore, Robert G Wickman HB; Wyatt PLAYER; Zuver, Merle G |

== Coaching staff ==
| Coach | Position | First year | Alma mater |
|---|---|---|---|
| Ernest Bearg | Head coach | 1925 | Washburn |
| Leo Sherer | Ends coach | 1923 | Nebraska |
| Charlie T. Black | Backfield coach | 1926 | Kansas |
| Bunny Oakes | Line coach | 1926 | Illinois |
| Ed Weir | Assistant line coach | 1926 | Nebraska |
| Harold Hutchison | | 1926 | Nebraska |

== Game summaries ==
=== Drake ===
Drake at Nebraska

| Team | 1 | 2 | Total |
|---|---|---|---|
| Drake | | | 0 |
| • Nebraska | | | 21 |

- Date: October 2
- Location: Memorial Stadium • Lincoln, Nebraska

Nebraska opened the 1926 season by trouncing conference foe Drake in Lincoln, in a game where nearly every player on the large roster found playing time, as the Cornhuskers avenged the surprise loss handed to them by Drake in 1925. This was the last game played between Nebraska and Drake, closing out one of the oldest series in Nebraska football history, dating back to 1898, with Nebraska dominating the matchup 6–2 all-time.

=== Missouri ===
Missouri at Nebraska

| Team | 1 | 2 | Total |
|---|---|---|---|
| • Missouri | | | 14 |
| Nebraska | | | 7 |

- Date: October 9
- Location: Memorial Stadium • Lincoln, Nebraska

Nebraska stumbled early in the season when Missouri came into Lincoln and shut down the Cornhuskers despite their quick jump to an early 7–0 lead. Those would be the last points scored in the game, as Missouri managed 14 in response. Nebraska produced respectable offensive output over the course of the game, but was unable to create any points for their efforts. Missouri's win helped them chip away at the series lead held by the Cornhuskers, moving them to 5–14–1.

=== Washington University ===
Nebraska at Washington University

| Team | 1 | 2 | Total |
|---|---|---|---|
| • Nebraska | | | 20 |
| Washington University | | | 6 |

- Date: October 16
- Location: Francis Field • St. Louis County, Missouri

This game amounted to a win for both teams. Nebraska scored the points to carry the outcome in their third conference game of the season, while the Washington Bears were pleased to have scored points at all against conference heavyweight Nebraska. Although the Washington Bears and Nebraska Cornhuskers had shared the same conference since 1907 (except for 1919–1920 when Nebraska was an independent), this was only the second game played between these programs. It was also the last, with a split final record of 1–1 after accounting for Nebraska's loss to the Bears back in 1918.

=== Kansas ===
Nebraska at Kansas

| Team | 1 | 2 | Total |
|---|---|---|---|
| • Nebraska | | | 20 |
| Kansas | | | 3 |

- Date: October 23
- Location: Memorial Stadium • Lawrence, Kansas

After a slow start where Nebraska was only able to come up with a single score in the first half, the Cornhuskers pulled away to notch another conference win for the year, and padded their series lead over Kansas to 22–9–2.

=== Iowa State ===
Iowa State at Nebraska

| Team | 1 | 2 | Total |
|---|---|---|---|
| Iowa State | | | 6 |
| • Nebraska | | | 31 |

- Date: October 30
- Location: Memorial Stadium • Lincoln, Nebraska

The Cornhuskers scored first early on in the opening minutes of the game, but a lost Nebraska fumble not long after made it look like a battle was forming up. Iowa State capitalized on the turnover for what would be their only score of the day, as the Cornhuskers eventually rolled up 31 points to secure their fourth win of the season. The Cyclones slid further behind in the series, to 4–16–1.

=== Kansas State ===
Kansas State at Nebraska

| Team | 1 | 2 | 3 | 4 | Total |
|---|---|---|---|---|---|
| Kansas State | 0 | 0 | 0 | 0 | 0 |
| • Nebraska | 0 | 0 | 3 | 0 | 3 |

- Date: November 13
- Location: Memorial Stadium • Lincoln, Nebraska

The Kansas State Aggies gave Nebraska the biggest battle of the season, perhaps emboldened by nearly winning against the Cornhuskers in 1925 for the first time prior to settling for a tie that year. Somehow the Cornhuskers were able to hang onto the game and fight back. Repeatedly, Kansas State attempted field goals which were summarily blocked by Nebraska, and the Cornhuskers themselves were frequently on their heels and forced to punt out of trouble. Nebraska managed one field goal in the third quarter, which was the only score of the game for either side. Kansas State was sent back to Manhattan in disappointment and still winless against the Cornhuskers in eleven tries.

=== New York University ===
New York University at Nebraska

| Team | 1 | 2 | Total |
|---|---|---|---|
| New York University | | | 7 |
| • Nebraska | | | 15 |

- Date: November 20
- Location: Memorial Stadium • Lincoln, Nebraska

New York University, in their first ever game against Nebraska, drew first blood with an early touchdown, but the game was controlled by the Cornhuskers for the rest of the contest as Nebraska closed out the last home game of 1926 with a win.

=== Washington ===
Nebraska at Washington

| Team | 1 | 2 | Total |
|---|---|---|---|
| Nebraska | | | 6 |
| • Washington | | | 10 |

- Date: November 25
- Location: Husky Stadium • Seattle, Washington

Reciprocating for last year, the Cornhuskers traveled to Seattle to play there for the first time. Both teams had been waiting for this rematch of the 1925 game which had ended in a 6–6 tie. With the Huskies barely holding a four-point lead in the final minutes, Nebraska marched down the field in a series recorded as one of the best ever to date put together by the Cornhuskers. As the seconds ticked away, Nebraska arrived at the Washington 8-yard line with a first down. On their fourth subsequent attempt to steal the win, time ran out as Nebraska's last effort fell short at the 3. Washington sent Nebraska home with their victory denied, and was left holding a tenuous 1–0–1 lead in the series.

== After the season ==
Coach Bearg's second season was an improvement over 1925, as Nebraska finished 2nd in the conference, and his career record improved to 10–4–2 (.688). The program's overall record was nudged slightly upward to 207–71–19 (.729), while Nebraska's conference winning percentage all-time remained unchanged at 45–7–5 (.833).
