= 1926 Furman Purple Hurricane football team =

American college football season

1926 Furman Purple Hurricane football
- Conference: Southern Intercollegiate Athletic Association
- Record: 8–1–1 (3–1–1 SIAA)
- Head coach: Billy Laval (12th season)
- Captain: Troy Thomas
- Home stadium: Manly Field

1926 Southern Intercollegiate Athletic Association football standings
	Conf.					Overall
Team	W		L		T	W		L		T
Centenary +	5	–	0	–	0	5	–	3	–	0
Chattanooga +	4	–	0	–	2	6	–	2	–	2
Presbyterian	5	–	1	–	0	7	–	2	–	0
Furman	3	–	1	–	1	8	–	1	–	1
Stetson	3	–	1	–	0	5	–	1	–	1
Georgetown (KY)	3	–	1	–	1	6	–	2	–	1
Louisiana Tech	3	–	1	–	0	5	–	2	–	2
Birmingham–Southern	3	–	1	–	2	5	–	3	–	2
Mercer	3	–	1	–	1	4	–	3	–	2
Mississippi College	5	–	2	–	0	6	–	3	–	0
Louisville	2	–	1	–	0	6	–	2	–	0
Centre	2	–	1	–	2	3	–	4	–	2
The Citadel	5	–	3	–	0	7	–	3	–	0
SW Louisiana	2	–	2	–	0	6	–	3	–	1
Transylvania	1	–	1	–	0	4	–	3	–	0
Southern College	2	–	2	–	0	4	–	4	–	0
Oglethorpe	3	–	4	–	1	3	–	7	–	1
Howard (AL)	2	–	3	–	1	4	–	4	–	1
Western Kentucky State Normal	1	–	2	–	1	4	–	4	–	1
Newberry	2	–	4	–	0	2	–	5	–	0
Millsaps	2	–	6	–	0	2	–	8	–	0
Wofford	1	–	3	–	0	2	–	8	–	0
Union (TN)	1	–	4	–	0	3	–	6	–	0
Louisiana College	0	–	4	–	0	3	–	5	–	0
Kentucky Wesleyan	0	–	4	–	0	3	–	6	–	0
Erskine	0	–	4	–	0	1	–	7	–	0
Rollins	0	–	4	–	0	0	–	6	–	0
+ – Conference co-champions

The 1926 Furman Purple Hurricane football team represented Furman University as a member of the Southern Intercollegiate Athletic Association (SIAA) during the 1926 college football season. Led by 12th-year head coach Billy Laval, the Purple Hurricane compiled an overall record of 8–1–1 with a mark of 3–1–1 in SIAA play. The team was coached by Billy Laval.

== Schedule ==
Date	Time	Opponent	Site	Result	Attendance	Source
September 25		Newberry	Manly Field; Greenville, SC	W 30–0		
October 2		at NC State*	Riddick Stadium; Raleigh, NC	W 31–0		
October 9		Wake Forest*	Manly Field; Greenville, SC	W 10–0		
October 16		at Georgia*	Sanford Field; Athens, GA	W 14–7		
October 23		Presbyterian	Manly Field; Greenville, SC	W 13–7		
October 30	2:00 p.m.	at Oglethorpe	Spiller Field; Atlanta, GA	L 11–12	3,000	
November 6		Mercer	Manly Field; Greenville, SC	T 6–6		
November 13		at South Carolina*	Melton Field; Columbia, SC	W 10–7		
November 20		The Citadel	College Park Stadium; Charleston, SC (rivalry)	W 7–0		
November 25		Clemson*	Manly Field; Greenville, SC	W 30–0		
*Non-conference game
