= Paul Rebsamen =

American football player (1905–1947)

Profile
- Position: Center

Personal information
- Born: January 29, 1905; Fort Smith, Arkansas, U.S.
- Died: March 13, 1947 (aged 42); Hot Springs, Arkansas, U.S.
- Listed height: 6 ft 0 in (1.83 m)
- Listed weight: 188 lb (85 kg)

Career information
- College: Centenary

Career history
- Pottsville Maroons (1927)
- Stats at Pro Football Reference

Paul Myer Rebsamen (January 29, 1905 – March 13, 1947) was an American professional football player from Fort Smith, Arkansas who played one season in the National Football League (NFL). He attended Centenary College of Louisiana and made his NFL debut in 1927 with the Pottsville Maroons.
