= 1926 Centenary Gentlemen football team =

American college football season

1926 Centenary Gentlemen football

SIAA champion
- Conference: Southern Intercollegiate Athletic Association
- Record: 6–3 (5–0 SIAA)
- Head coach: Homer Norton (1st season)
- Captain: Paul Rebsamen
- Home stadium: Centenary Field

1926 Southern Intercollegiate Athletic Association football standings
	Conf.					Overall
Team	W		L		T	W		L		T
Centenary +	5	–	0	–	0	5	–	3	–	0
Chattanooga +	4	–	0	–	2	6	–	2	–	2
Presbyterian	5	–	1	–	0	7	–	2	–	0
Furman	3	–	1	–	1	8	–	1	–	1
Stetson	3	–	1	–	0	5	–	1	–	1
Georgetown (KY)	3	–	1	–	1	6	–	2	–	1
Louisiana Tech	3	–	1	–	0	5	–	2	–	2
Birmingham–Southern	3	–	1	–	2	5	–	3	–	2
Mercer	3	–	1	–	1	4	–	3	–	2
Mississippi College	5	–	2	–	0	6	–	3	–	0
Louisville	2	–	1	–	0	6	–	2	–	0
Centre	2	–	1	–	2	3	–	4	–	2
The Citadel	5	–	3	–	0	7	–	3	–	0
SW Louisiana	2	–	2	–	0	6	–	3	–	1
Transylvania	1	–	1	–	0	4	–	3	–	0
Southern College	2	–	2	–	0	4	–	4	–	0
Oglethorpe	3	–	4	–	1	3	–	7	–	1
Howard (AL)	2	–	3	–	1	4	–	4	–	1
Western Kentucky State Normal	1	–	2	–	1	4	–	4	–	1
Newberry	2	–	4	–	0	2	–	5	–	0
Millsaps	2	–	6	–	0	2	–	8	–	0
Wofford	1	–	3	–	0	2	–	8	–	0
Union (TN)	1	–	4	–	0	3	–	6	–	0
Louisiana College	0	–	4	–	0	3	–	5	–	0
Kentucky Wesleyan	0	–	4	–	0	3	–	6	–	0
Erskine	0	–	4	–	0	1	–	7	–	0
Rollins	0	–	4	–	0	0	–	6	–	0
+ – Conference co-champions

The 1926 Centenary Gentlemen football team represented the Centenary College of Louisiana as a member of the Southern Intercollegiate Athletic Association (SIAA) during the 1926 college football season. The team was led by first-year head coach Homer Norton.

== Schedule ==
Date	Time	Opponent	Site	Result	Attendance	Source
September 25		Union (TN)	Centenary Field; Shreveport, LA	W 47–7	3,000	
October 2		at TCU*	Clark Field; Fort Worth, TX	L 14–24		
October 8		at SMU*	Ownby Stadium; University Park, TX	L 0–37		
October 16		Mississippi College	Shreveport, LA	W 28–14		
October 23		at Arkansas*	The Hill; Fayetteville, AR	L 6–33		
October 30		Central State Teachers*	State Fair Grounds; Shreveport, LA	W 14–10	3,000	
November 11		Louisiana Tech	Shreveport, LA	W 7–0	7,000	
November 20	2:30 p.m.	Millsaps	Centenary Field; Shreveport, LA	W 34–0	2,000	
November 25		Oglethorpe	Shreveport, LA	W 56–7	7,000	
*Non-conference game; All times are in Central time
