= List of Southwest Conference football standings =

This is a list of yearly Southwest Conference football standings.

== Southwest standings ==
1915 Southwest Conference football standings
	Conf.					Overall
Team	W		L		T	W		L		T
Oklahoma $	3	–	0	–	0	10	–	0	–	0
Baylor	3	–	0	–	0	7	–	1	–	0
Texas A&M	1	–	1	–	0	6	–	2	–	0
Texas	2	–	2	–	0	6	–	3	–	0
Arkansas	1	–	1	–	0	4	–	2	–	1
Rice	1	–	2	–	0	5	–	3	–	0
Oklahoma A&M	0	–	3	–	0	4	–	5	–	1
Southwestern (TX)	0	–	2	–	0	4	–	3	–	0
Baylor forfeited claim to co-champion for using ineligible player.

1916 Southwest Conference football standings
	Conf.					Overall
Team	W		L		T	W		L		T
Texas	5	–	1	–	0	7	–	2	–	0
Baylor	3	–	1	–	0	9	–	1	–	0
Rice	2	–	1	–	0	6	–	1	–	2
Oklahoma	2	–	1	–	0	6	–	5	–	0
Texas A&M	1	–	2	–	0	6	–	3	–	0
Arkansas	0	–	2	–	0	4	–	4	–	0
Oklahoma A&M	0	–	3	–	0	4	–	4	–	0
Southwestern (TX)	0	–	4	–	0	3	–	5	–	1
No champion recognized

1917 Southwest Conference football standings
	Conf.					Overall
Team	W		L		T	W		L		T
Texas A&M $	3	–	0	–	0	8	–	0	–	0
Baylor	2	–	1	–	0	6	–	2	–	1
Rice	1	–	1	–	0	7	–	1	–	0
Oklahoma	1	–	1	–	1	6	–	4	–	1
Texas	2	–	4	–	0	4	–	4	–	0
Oklahoma A&M	1	–	2	–	0	4	–	4	–	0
Arkansas	0	–	1	–	1	5	–	1	–	1
$ – Conference champion

1918 Southwest Conference football standings
	Conf.					Overall
Team	W		L		T	W		L		T
Texas	4	–	0	–	0	9	–	0	–	0
Oklahoma	2	–	0	–	0	6	–	0	–	0
Texas A&M	1	–	1	–	0	6	–	1	–	0
Rice	1	–	1	–	0	1	–	5	–	1
SMU	1	–	2	–	0	4	–	2	–	0
Arkansas	0	–	1	–	0	3	–	2	–	0
Oklahoma A&M	0	–	2	–	0	4	–	2	–	0
Baylor	0	–	2	–	0	0	–	6	–	0
No champion recognized; Rankings from AP Poll

1919 Southwest Conference football standings
	Conf.					Overall
Team	W		L		T	W		L		T
Texas A&M $	4	–	0	–	0	10	–	0	–	0
Rice	3	–	1	–	0	8	–	1	–	0
Oklahoma	2	–	1	–	0	5	–	2	–	3
Texas	3	–	2	–	0	6	–	3	–	0
Arkansas	1	–	2	–	0	3	–	4	–	0
SMU	0	–	2	–	1	5	–	4	–	1
Oklahoma A&M	0	–	2	–	0	3	–	3	–	2
Baylor	0	–	3	–	1	5	–	3	–	1
$ – Conference champion

1920 Southwest Conference football standings
	Conf.					Overall
Team	W		L		T	W		L		T
Texas $	5	–	0	–	0	9	–	0	–	0
Texas A&M	5	–	1	–	0	6	–	1	–	1
Arkansas	2	–	0	–	1	3	–	2	–	2
Rice	2	–	2	–	1	4	–	2	–	2
Baylor	1	–	2	–	1	4	–	4	–	1
SMU	0	–	4	–	1	3	–	5	–	2
Phillips	0	–	3	–	0	4	–	4	–	2
Oklahoma A&M	0	–	3	–	0	0	–	7	–	1
$ – Conference champion

1921 Southwest Conference football standings
	Conf.					Overall
Team	W		L		T	W		L		T
Texas A&M $	3	–	0	–	2	6	–	1	–	2
Texas	1	–	0	–	1	6	–	1	–	1
Arkansas	2	–	1	–	0	5	–	3	–	1
Baylor	2	–	2	–	0	8	–	3	–	0
Oklahoma A&M	1	–	1	–	0	5	–	4	–	1
Rice	1	–	2	–	1	4	–	4	–	1
SMU	0	–	4	–	0	1	–	6	–	1
$ – Conference champion

1922 Southwest Conference football standings
	Conf.					Overall
Team	W		L		T	W		L		T
Baylor $	5	–	0	–	0	8	–	3	–	0
Texas	2	–	1	–	0	7	–	2	–	0
SMU	2	–	2	–	0	6	–	3	–	1
Texas A&M	2	–	2	–	0	5	–	4	–	1
Oklahoma A&M	2	–	3	–	0	4	–	4	–	1
Arkansas	1	–	3	–	0	4	–	5	–	0
Rice	1	–	4	–	0	4	–	4	–	0
$ – Conference champion

1923 Southwest Conference football standings
	Conf.					Overall
Team	W		L		T	W		L		T
SMU $	5	–	0	–	0	9	–	0	–	0
Texas	2	–	0	–	1	8	–	0	–	1
TCU	2	–	1	–	0	4	–	5	–	0
Baylor	1	–	1	–	2	5	–	1	–	2
Arkansas	2	–	2	–	0	6	–	2	–	1
Oklahoma A&M	1	–	3	–	0	2	–	8	–	0
Rice	1	–	4	–	0	3	–	5	–	0
Texas A&M	0	–	3	–	1	5	–	3	–	1
$ – Conference champion

1924 Southwest Conference football standings
	Conf.					Overall
Team	W		L		T	W		L		T
Baylor $	4	–	0	–	1	7	–	2	–	1
SMU	2	–	0	–	4	5	–	0	–	4
Rice	2	–	2	–	0	4	–	4	–	0
Texas A&M	2	–	2	–	1	7	–	2	–	1
Oklahoma A&M	1	–	1	–	1	6	–	1	–	2
Texas	2	–	3	–	0	5	–	3	–	1
Arkansas	1	–	2	–	1	7	–	2	–	1
TCU	1	–	5	–	0	4	–	5	–	0
$ – Conference champion

1925 Southwest Conference football standings
	Conf.					Overall
Team	W		L		T	W		L		T
Texas A&M $	4	–	1	–	0	7	–	1	–	1
TCU	2	–	0	–	1	7	–	1	–	1
Texas	2	–	1	–	1	6	–	2	–	1
SMU	1	–	1	–	2	5	–	2	–	2
Rice	1	–	2	–	1	4	–	4	–	1
Arkansas	1	–	2	–	1	4	–	4	–	1
Baylor	0	–	3	–	2	3	–	5	–	2
$ – Conference champion

1926 Southwest Conference football standings
	Conf.					Overall
Team	W		L		T	W		L		T
SMU $	5	–	0	–	0	8	–	0	–	1
Baylor	3	–	1	–	1	6	–	3	–	1
TCU	1	–	1	–	2	6	–	1	–	2
Texas	2	–	2	–	0	5	–	4	–	0
Arkansas	2	–	2	–	0	5	–	5	–	0
Texas A&M	1	–	3	–	1	5	–	3	–	1
Rice	0	–	4	–	0	4	–	4	–	1
$ – Conference champion; Arkansas's games against Ole Miss, Centenary, and LSU counted in the conference standings.

1927 Southwest Conference football standings
	Conf.					Overall
Team	W		L		T	W		L		T
No. 11 Texas A&M $	4	–	0	–	1	8	–	0	–	1
SMU	4	–	1	–	0	7	–	2	–	0
Arkansas	2	–	1	–	0	8	–	1	–	0
Texas	2	–	2	–	1	6	–	2	–	1
TCU	1	–	2	–	2	4	–	3	–	2
Rice	1	–	3	–	0	2	–	6	–	1
Baylor	0	–	5	–	0	2	–	7	–	0
$ – Conference champion; Rankings from Dickinson System

1928 Southwest Conference football standings
	Conf.					Overall
Team	W		L		T	W		L		T
Texas $	5	–	1	–	0	7	–	2	–	0
Arkansas	2	–	1	–	0	7	–	2	–	0
Baylor	3	–	2	–	0	8	–	2	–	0
TCU	3	–	2	–	0	8	–	2	–	0
SMU	2	–	2	–	1	6	–	3	–	1
Texas A&M	1	–	3	–	1	5	–	4	–	1
Rice	0	–	5	–	0	2	–	7	–	0
$ – Conference champion

1929 Southwest Conference football standings
	Conf.					Overall
Team	W		L		T	W		L		T
No. 8 TCU $	4	–	0	–	1	9	–	0	–	1
No. 9 SMU	3	–	0	–	2	6	–	0	–	4
Arkansas	3	–	2	–	0	7	–	2	–	0
Texas	2	–	2	–	2	5	–	2	–	2
Baylor	2	–	2	–	1	7	–	3	–	1
Texas A&M	2	–	3	–	0	5	–	3	–	0
Rice	0	–	5	–	0	2	–	7	–	0
$ – Conference champion; Rankings from Dickinson System

1930 Southwest Conference football standings
	Conf.					Overall
Team	W		L		T	W		L		T
Texas $	4	–	1	–	0	8	–	1	–	1
Baylor	3	–	1	–	1	6	–	3	–	1
TCU	4	–	2	–	0	9	–	2	–	1
SMU	2	–	2	–	1	6	–	3	–	1
Arkansas	2	–	2	–	0	3	–	6	–	0
Rice	2	–	4	–	0	8	–	4	–	0
Texas A&M	0	–	5	–	0	2	–	7	–	0
$ – Conference champion

1931 Southwest Conference football standings
	Conf.					Overall
Team	W		L		T	W		L		T
SMU $	5	–	0	–	1	9	–	1	–	1
TCU	4	–	1	–	1	8	–	2	–	1
Texas A&M	3	–	2	–	0	7	–	3	–	0
Rice	3	–	3	–	0	6	–	4	–	0
Texas	2	–	3	–	0	6	–	4	–	0
Baylor	1	–	5	–	0	3	–	6	–	0
Arkansas	0	–	4	–	0	3	–	5	–	1
$ – Conference champion

1932 Southwest Conference football standings
	Conf.					Overall
Team	W		L		T	W		L		T
No. 10 TCU $	6	–	0	–	0	10	–	0	–	1
Texas	5	–	1	–	0	8	–	2	–	0
Rice	3	–	3	–	0	7	–	3	–	0
Texas A&M	1	–	2	–	2	4	–	4	–	2
Baylor	1	–	4	–	1	3	–	5	–	1
SMU	1	–	4	–	1	3	–	7	–	2
Arkansas	1	–	4	–	0	1	–	6	–	2
$ – Conference champion; Rankings from Dickinson System

1933 Southwest Conference football standings
	Conf.					Overall
Team	W		L		T	W		L		T
Arkansas	4	–	1	–	0	7	–	3	–	1
TCU	4	–	2	–	0	9	–	2	–	1
Baylor	4	–	2	–	0	6	–	4	–	0
Texas A&M	2	–	2	–	1	6	–	3	–	1
Texas	2	–	3	–	1	4	–	5	–	2
SMU	2	–	4	–	0	4	–	7	–	1
Rice	1	–	5	–	0	3	–	8	–	0
Because of an ineligible played used by Arkansas, no championship was awarded.

1934 Southwest Conference football standings
	Conf.					Overall
Team	W		L		T	W		L		T
No. 5 Rice $	5	–	1	–	0	9	–	1	–	1
Texas	4	–	1	–	1	7	–	2	–	1
SMU	3	–	2	–	1	8	–	2	–	2
TCU	3	–	3	–	0	8	–	4	–	0
Arkansas	2	–	3	–	1	4	–	4	–	2
Texas A&M	1	–	4	–	1	2	–	7	–	2
Baylor	1	–	5	–	0	3	–	7	–	0
$ – Conference champion; Rankings from Dickinson System

1935 Southwest Conference football standings
	Conf.					Overall
Team	W		L		T	W		L		T
No. 2 SMU $	6	–	0	–	0	12	–	1	–	0
No. 4 TCU	5	–	1	–	0	12	–	1	–	0
Baylor	3	–	3	–	0	8	–	3	–	0
Rice	3	–	3	–	0	8	–	3	–	0
Arkansas	2	–	4	–	0	5	–	5	–	0
Texas A&M	1	–	5	–	0	3	–	7	–	0
Texas	1	–	5	–	0	4	–	6	–	0
$ – Conference champion; Rankings from United Press

1936 Southwest Conference football standings
	Conf.					Overall
Team	W		L		T	W		L		T
No. 18 Arkansas $	5	–	1	–	0	7	–	3	–	0
No. 16 TCU	4	–	1	–	1	9	–	2	–	2
Texas A&M	3	–	2	–	1	8	–	3	–	1
Baylor	3	–	2	–	1	6	–	3	–	1
SMU	2	–	3	–	1	5	–	4	–	1
Rice	1	–	5	–	0	5	–	7	–	0
Texas	1	–	5	–	0	2	–	6	–	1
$ – Conference champion; Rankings from AP Poll

1937 Southwest Conference football standings
	Conf.					Overall
Team	W		L		T	W		L		T
No. 18 Rice $	4	–	1	–	1	6	–	3	–	2
No. 16 TCU	3	–	1	–	2	4	–	4	–	2
No. T–14 Arkansas	3	–	2	–	1	6	–	2	–	2
Baylor	3	–	3	–	0	7	–	3	–	0
Texas A&M	2	–	2	–	2	5	–	2	–	2
SMU	2	–	4	–	0	5	–	6	–	0
Texas	1	–	5	–	0	2	–	6	–	1
$ – Conference champion; Rankings from AP Poll

1938 Southwest Conference football standings
	Conf.					Overall
Team	W		L		T	W		L		T
No. 1 TCU $	6	–	0	–	0	11	–	0	–	0
SMU	4	–	2	–	0	6	–	4	–	0
Baylor	3	–	2	–	1	7	–	2	–	1
Rice	3	–	3	–	0	4	–	6	–	0
Texas A&M	2	–	3	–	1	4	–	4	–	1
Arkansas	1	–	5	–	0	2	–	7	–	1
Texas	1	–	5	–	0	1	–	8	–	0
$ – Conference champion; Rankings from AP Poll

1939 Southwest Conference football standings
	Conf.					Overall
Team	W		L		T	W		L		T
No. 1 Texas A&M $	6	–	0	–	0	11	–	0	–	0
Baylor	4	–	2	–	0	7	–	3	–	0
SMU	4	–	2	–	0	6	–	3	–	1
Texas	3	–	3	–	0	5	–	4	–	0
Arkansas	2	–	3	–	1	4	–	5	–	1
TCU	1	–	5	–	0	3	–	7	–	0
Rice	0	–	5	–	1	1	–	9	–	1
$ – Conference champion; Rankings from AP Poll

1940 Southwest Conference football standings
	Conf.					Overall
Team	W		L		T	W		L		T
No. 6 Texas A&M $	5	–	1	–	0	9	–	1	–	0
No. 16 SMU	5	–	1	–	0	8	–	1	–	1
Texas	4	–	2	–	0	8	–	2	–	0
Rice	4	–	2	–	0	7	–	3	–	0
TCU	2	–	4	–	0	3	–	7	–	0
Arkansas	1	–	5	–	0	4	–	6	–	0
Baylor	0	–	6	–	0	4	–	6	–	0
$ – Conference champion; Rankings from AP Poll

1941 Southwest Conference football standings
	Conf.					Overall
Team	W		L		T	W		L		T
No. 9 Texas A&M $	5	–	1	–	0	9	–	2	–	0
No. 4 Texas	4	–	1	–	1	8	–	1	–	1
TCU	4	–	1	–	1	7	–	3	–	1
Rice	3	–	2	–	1	6	–	3	–	1
SMU	2	–	4	–	0	5	–	5	–	0
Baylor	1	–	4	–	1	3	–	6	–	1
Arkansas	0	–	6	–	0	3	–	7	–	0
$ – Conference champion; Rankings from AP Poll

1942 Southwest Conference football standings
	Conf.					Overall
Team	W		L		T	W		L		T
No. 11 Texas $	5	–	1	–	0	9	–	2	–	0
Rice	4	–	1	–	1	7	–	2	–	1
TCU	4	–	2	–	0	7	–	3	–	0
Baylor	3	–	2	–	1	6	–	4	–	1
Texas A&M	2	–	3	–	1	4	–	5	–	1
SMU	1	–	4	–	1	3	–	6	–	2
Arkansas	0	–	6	–	0	3	–	7	–	0
Rankings from AP Poll

1943 Southwest Conference football standings
	Conf.					Overall
Team	W		L		T	W		L		T
No. 14 Texas $	5	–	0	–	0	7	–	1	–	1
Texas A&M	4	–	1	–	0	7	–	2	–	1
Rice	2	–	3	–	0	3	–	7	–	0
SMU	2	–	3	–	0	2	–	7	–	0
TCU	1	–	4	–	0	2	–	6	–	0
Arkansas	1	–	4	–	0	2	–	7	–	0
$ – Conference champion; Rankings from AP Poll

1944 Southwest Conference football standings
	Conf.					Overall
Team	W		L		T	W		L		T
TCU $	3	–	1	–	1	7	–	3	–	1
Texas	3	–	2	–	0	5	–	4	–	0
Arkansas	2	–	2	–	1	5	–	5	–	1
Texas A&M	2	–	3	–	0	7	–	4	–	0
SMU	2	–	3	–	0	5	–	5	–	0
Rice	2	–	3	–	0	5	–	6	–	0
$ – Conference champion

1945 Southwest Conference football standings
	Conf.					Overall
Team	W		L		T	W		L		T
No. 10 Texas $	5	–	1	–	0	10	–	1	–	0
SMU	4	–	2	–	0	5	–	6	–	0
TCU	3	–	3	–	0	5	–	5	–	0
Rice	3	–	3	–	0	5	–	6	–	0
Texas A&M	3	–	3	–	0	6	–	4	–	0
Baylor	2	–	4	–	0	5	–	5	–	1
Arkansas	1	–	5	–	0	3	–	7	–	0
$ – Conference champion; Rankings from AP Poll

1946 Southwest Conference football standings
	Conf.					Overall
Team	W		L		T	W		L		T
No. 10 Rice +	5	–	1	–	0	9	–	2	–	0
No. 16 Arkansas +	5	–	1	–	0	6	–	3	–	2
No. 15 Texas	4	–	2	–	0	8	–	2	–	0
Texas A&M	4	–	2	–	0	4	–	6	–	0
SMU	2	–	4	–	0	4	–	5	–	1
TCU	2	–	4	–	0	2	–	7	–	1
Baylor	0	–	6	–	0	1	–	8	–	0
+ – Conference co-champions; Rankings from AP Poll

1947 Southwest Conference football standings
	Conf.					Overall
Team	W		L		T	W		L		T
No. 3 SMU $	5	–	0	–	1	9	–	0	–	2
No. 5 Texas	5	–	1	–	0	10	–	1	–	0
No. 18 Rice	4	–	2	–	0	6	–	3	–	1
TCU	2	–	3	–	1	4	–	5	–	2
Arkansas	1	–	4	–	1	6	–	4	–	1
Texas A&M	1	–	4	–	1	3	–	6	–	1
Baylor	1	–	5	–	0	5	–	5	–	0
$ – Conference champion; Rankings from AP Poll

1948 Southwest Conference football standings
	Conf.					Overall
Team	W		L		T	W		L		T
No. 10 SMU $	5	–	0	–	1	9	–	1	–	1
Texas	4	–	1	–	1	7	–	3	–	1
Baylor	3	–	2	–	1	6	–	3	–	2
Rice	3	–	2	–	1	5	–	4	–	1
Arkansas	2	–	4	–	0	5	–	5	–	0
TCU	1	–	4	–	1	4	–	5	–	1
Texas A&M	0	–	5	–	1	0	–	9	–	1
$ – Conference champion; Rankings from AP Poll

1949 Southwest Conference football standings
	Conf.					Overall
Team	W		L		T	W		L		T
No. 5 Rice $	6	–	0	–	0	10	–	1	–	0
No. 20 Baylor	4	–	2	–	0	8	–	2	–	0
TCU	3	–	3	–	0	6	–	3	–	1
Texas	3	–	3	–	0	6	–	4	–	0
SMU	2	–	3	–	1	5	–	4	–	1
Arkansas	2	–	4	–	0	5	–	5	–	0
Texas A&M	0	–	5	–	1	1	–	8	–	1
$ – Conference champion; Rankings from AP Poll

1950 Southwest Conference football standings
	Conf.					Overall
Team	W		L		T	W		L		T
No. 3 Texas $	6	–	0	–	0	9	–	2	–	0
Baylor	4	–	2	–	0	7	–	3	–	0
Texas A&M	3	–	3	–	0	7	–	4	–	0
TCU	3	–	3	–	0	5	–	5	–	0
Rice	2	–	4	–	0	6	–	4	–	0
SMU	2	–	4	–	0	6	–	4	–	0
Arkansas	1	–	5	–	0	2	–	8	–	0
$ – Conference champion; Rankings from AP Poll

1951 Southwest Conference football standings
	Conf.					Overall
Team	W		L		T	W		L		T
No. 11 TCU $	5	–	1	–	0	6	–	5	–	0
No. 9 Baylor	4	–	1	–	1	8	–	2	–	1
Texas	3	–	3	–	0	7	–	3	–	0
Rice	3	–	3	–	0	5	–	5	–	0
Texas A&M	1	–	3	–	2	5	–	3	–	2
Arkansas	2	–	4	–	0	5	–	5	–	0
SMU	1	–	4	–	1	3	–	6	–	1
$ – Conference champion; Rankings from AP poll

1952 Southwest Conference football standings
	Conf.					Overall
Team	W		L		T	W		L		T
No. 10 Texas $	6	–	0	–	0	9	–	2	–	0
Rice	4	–	2	–	0	5	–	5	–	0
SMU	3	–	2	–	1	4	–	5	–	1
TCU	2	–	2	–	2	4	–	4	–	2
Baylor	1	–	3	–	2	4	–	4	–	2
Texas A&M	1	–	4	–	1	3	–	6	–	1
Arkansas	1	–	5	–	0	2	–	8	–	0
$ – Conference champion; Rankings from AP Poll

1953 Southwest Conference football standings
	Conf.					Overall
Team	W		L		T	W		L		T
No. 6 Rice +	5	–	1	–	0	9	–	2	–	0
No. 11 Texas +	5	–	1	–	0	7	–	3	–	0
Baylor	4	–	2	–	0	7	–	3	–	0
SMU	3	–	3	–	0	5	–	5	–	0
Arkansas	2	–	4	–	0	3	–	7	–	0
Texas A&M	1	–	5	–	0	4	–	5	–	1
TCU	1	–	5	–	0	3	–	7	–	0
+ – Conference co-champions; Rankings from AP Poll

1954 Southwest Conference football standings
	Conf.					Overall
Team	W		L		T	W		L		T
No. 10 Arkansas $	5	–	1	–	0	8	–	3	–	0
SMU	4	–	1	–	1	6	–	3	–	1
No. 19 Rice	4	–	2	–	0	7	–	3	–	0
No. 18 Baylor	4	–	2	–	0	7	–	4	–	0
Texas	2	–	3	–	1	4	–	5	–	1
TCU	1	–	5	–	0	4	–	6	–	0
Texas A&M	0	–	6	–	0	1	–	9	–	0
$ – Conference champion; Rankings from AP Poll

1955 Southwest Conference football standings
	Conf.					Overall
Team	W		L		T	W		L		T
No. 6 TCU $	5	–	1	–	0	9	–	2	–	0
No. 17 Texas A&M	4	–	1	–	1	7	–	2	–	1
Texas	4	–	2	–	0	5	–	5	–	0
Arkansas	3	–	2	–	1	5	–	4	–	1
Baylor	2	–	4	–	0	5	–	5	–	0
SMU	2	–	4	–	0	4	–	6	–	0
Rice	0	–	6	–	0	2	–	7	–	1
$ – Conference champion; Rankings from AP Poll

1956 Southwest Conference football standings
	Conf.					Overall
Team	W		L		T	W		L		T
No. 5 Texas A&M $	6	–	0	–	0	9	–	0	–	1
No. 14 TCU	5	–	1	–	0	8	–	3	–	0
No. 11 Baylor	4	–	2	–	0	9	–	2	–	0
Arkansas	3	–	3	–	0	6	–	4	–	0
SMU	2	–	4	–	0	4	–	6	–	0
Rice	1	–	5	–	0	4	–	6	–	0
Texas	0	–	6	–	0	1	–	9	–	0
$ – Conference champion; Rankings from AP Poll

1957 Southwest Conference football standings
	Conf.					Overall
Team	W		L		T	W		L		T
No. 8 Rice $	5	–	1	–	0	7	–	4	–	0
No. 11 Texas	4	–	1	–	1	6	–	4	–	1
No. 9 Texas A&M	4	–	2	–	0	8	–	3	–	0
SMU	3	–	3	–	0	4	–	5	–	1
Arkansas	2	–	4	–	0	6	–	4	–	0
TCU	2	–	4	–	0	5	–	4	–	1
Baylor	0	–	5	–	1	3	–	6	–	1
$ – Conference champion; Rankings from AP Poll

1958 Southwest Conference football standings
	Conf.					Overall
Team	W		L		T	W		L		T
No. 10 TCU $	5	–	1	–	0	8	–	2	–	1
No. 18 SMU	4	–	2	–	0	6	–	4	–	0
Rice	4	–	2	–	0	5	–	5	–	0
Texas	3	–	3	–	0	7	–	3	–	0
Arkansas	2	–	4	–	0	4	–	6	–	0
Texas A&M	2	–	4	–	0	4	–	6	–	0
Baylor	1	–	5	–	0	3	–	7	–	0
$ – Conference champion; Rankings from AP Poll

1959 Southwest Conference football standings
	Conf.					Overall
Team	W		L		T	W		L		T
No. 9 Arkansas +	5	–	1	–	0	9	–	2	–	0
No. 4 Texas +	5	–	1	–	0	9	–	2	–	0
No. 7 TCU +	5	–	1	–	0	8	–	3	–	0
SMU	2	–	3	–	1	5	–	4	–	1
Baylor	2	–	4	–	0	4	–	6	–	0
Rice	1	–	4	–	1	1	–	7	–	2
Texas A&M	0	–	6	–	0	3	–	7	–	0
+ – Conference co-champions; Rankings from AP Poll

1960 Southwest Conference football standings
	Conf.					Overall
Team	W		L		T	W		L		T
No. 7 Arkansas $	6	–	1	–	0	8	–	3	–	0
No. 12 Baylor	5	–	2	–	0	8	–	3	–	0
Texas	5	–	2	–	0	7	–	3	–	1
Rice	5	–	2	–	0	7	–	4	–	0
TCU	3	–	3	–	1	4	–	4	–	2
Texas Tech	1	–	5	–	1	3	–	6	–	1
Texas A&M	0	–	4	–	3	1	–	6	–	3
SMU	0	–	6	–	1	0	–	9	–	1
$ – Conference champion; Rankings from AP Poll

1961 Southwest Conference football standings
	Conf.					Overall
Team	W		L		T	W		L		T
No. 3 Texas +	6	–	1	–	0	10	–	1	–	0
No. 9 Arkansas +	6	–	1	–	0	8	–	3	–	0
Rice	5	–	2	–	0	7	–	4	–	0
Texas A&M	3	–	4	–	0	4	–	5	–	1
TCU	2	–	4	–	1	3	–	5	–	2
Baylor	2	–	5	–	0	6	–	5	–	0
Texas Tech	2	–	5	–	0	4	–	6	–	0
SMU	1	–	5	–	1	2	–	7	–	1
+ – Conference co-champions; Rankings from AP Poll

1962 Southwest Conference football standings
	Conf.					Overall
Team	W		L		T	W		L		T
No. 4 Texas $	6	–	0	–	1	9	–	1	–	1
No. 6 Arkansas	6	–	1	–	0	9	–	2	–	0
TCU	5	–	2	–	0	6	–	4	–	0
Texas A&M	3	–	4	–	0	3	–	7	–	0
Baylor	3	–	4	–	0	4	–	6	–	0
Rice	2	–	4	–	1	2	–	6	–	2
SMU	2	–	5	–	0	2	–	8	–	0
Texas Tech	0	–	7	–	0	1	–	9	–	0
$ – Conference champion; Rankings from AP Poll

1963 Southwest Conference football standings
	Conf.					Overall
Team	W		L		T	W		L		T
No. 1 Texas $	7	–	0	–	0	11	–	0	–	0
Baylor	6	–	1	–	0	8	–	3	–	0
Rice	4	–	3	–	0	6	–	4	–	0
Arkansas	3	–	4	–	0	5	–	5	–	0
TCU	2	–	4	–	1	4	–	5	–	1
Texas Tech	2	–	5	–	0	5	–	5	–	0
SMU	2	–	5	–	0	4	–	7	–	0
Texas A&M	1	–	5	–	1	2	–	7	–	1
$ – Conference champion; Rankings from AP Poll

1964 Southwest Conference football standings
	Conf.					Overall
Team	W		L		T	W		L		T
No. 2 Arkansas $	7	–	0	–	0	11	–	0	–	0
No. 5 Texas	6	–	1	–	0	10	–	1	–	0
Baylor	4	–	3	–	0	5	–	5	–	0
Texas Tech	3	–	3	–	1	6	–	4	–	1
Rice	3	–	3	–	1	4	–	5	–	1
TCU	3	–	4	–	0	4	–	6	–	0
Texas A&M	1	–	6	–	0	1	–	9	–	0
SMU	0	–	7	–	0	1	–	9	–	0
$ – Conference champion; Rankings from AP Poll

1965 Southwest Conference football standings
	Conf.					Overall
Team	W		L		T	W		L		T
No. 3 Arkansas $	7	–	0	–	0	10	–	1	–	0
Texas Tech	5	–	2	–	0	8	–	3	–	0
TCU	5	–	2	–	0	6	–	5	–	0
Texas	3	–	4	–	0	6	–	4	–	0
Baylor	3	–	4	–	0	5	–	5	–	0
SMU	3	–	4	–	0	4	–	5	–	1
Texas A&M	1	–	6	–	0	3	–	7	–	0
Rice	1	–	6	–	0	2	–	8	–	0
$ – Conference champion; Rankings from AP Poll

1966 Southwest Conference football standings
	Conf.					Overall
Team	W		L		T	W		L		T
No. 10 SMU $	6	–	1	–	0	8	–	3	–	0
Arkansas	5	–	2	–	0	8	–	2	–	0
Texas	5	–	2	–	0	7	–	4	–	0
Texas A&M	4	–	3	–	0	4	–	5	–	1
Baylor	3	–	4	–	0	5	–	5	–	0
Texas Tech	2	–	5	–	0	4	–	6	–	0
TCU	2	–	5	–	0	2	–	8	–	0
Rice	1	–	6	–	0	2	–	8	–	0
$ – Conference champion; Rankings from AP Poll

1967 Southwest Conference football standings
	Conf.					Overall
Team	W		L		T	W		L		T
Texas A&M $	6	–	1	–	0	7	–	4	–	0
Texas Tech	5	–	2	–	0	6	–	4	–	0
Texas	4	–	3	–	0	6	–	4	–	0
TCU	4	–	3	–	0	4	–	6	–	0
Arkansas	3	–	3	–	1	4	–	5	–	1
SMU	3	–	4	–	0	3	–	7	–	0
Rice	2	–	5	–	0	4	–	6	–	0
Baylor	0	–	6	–	1	1	–	8	–	1
$ – Conference champion

1968 Southwest Conference football standings
	Conf.					Overall
Team	W		L		T	W		L		T
No. 6 Arkansas +	6	–	1	–	0	10	–	1	–	0
No. 3 Texas +	6	–	1	–	0	9	–	1	–	1
No. 14 SMU	5	–	2	–	0	8	–	3	–	0
Texas Tech	4	–	3	–	0	5	–	3	–	2
Baylor	3	–	4	–	0	3	–	7	–	0
Texas A&M	2	–	5	–	0	3	–	7	–	0
TCU	2	–	5	–	0	3	–	7	–	0
Rice	0	–	7	–	0	0	–	9	–	1
+ – Conference co-champions; Rankings from AP Poll

1969 Southwest Conference football standings
	Conf.					Overall
Team	W		L		T	W		L		T
No. 1 Texas $	7	–	0	–	0	11	–	0	–	0
No. 7 Arkansas	6	–	1	–	0	9	–	2	–	0
Texas Tech	4	–	3	–	0	5	–	5	–	0
TCU	4	–	3	–	0	4	–	6	–	0
SMU	3	–	4	–	0	3	–	7	–	0
Rice	2	–	5	–	0	3	–	7	–	0
Texas A&M	2	–	5	–	0	3	–	7	–	0
Baylor	0	–	7	–	0	0	–	10	–	0
$ – Conference champion; Rankings from AP Poll

1970 Southwest Conference football standings
	Conf.					Overall
Team	W		L		T	W		L		T
No. 3 Texas $	7	–	0	–	0	10	–	1	–	0
No. 11 Arkansas	6	–	1	–	0	9	–	2	–	0
Texas Tech	5	–	2	–	0	8	–	4	–	0
Rice	3	–	4	–	0	5	–	5	–	0
SMU	3	–	4	–	0	5	–	6	–	0
TCU	3	–	4	–	0	4	–	6	–	1
Baylor	1	–	6	–	0	2	–	9	–	0
Texas A&M	0	–	7	–	0	2	–	9	–	0
$ – Conference champion; Rankings from AP Poll

1971 Southwest Conference football standings
	Conf.					Overall
Team	W		L		T	W		L		T
No. 18 Texas $	6	–	1	–	0	8	–	3	–	0
No. 16 Arkansas	5	–	1	–	1	8	–	3	–	1
TCU	5	–	2	–	0	6	–	4	–	1
Texas A&M	4	–	3	–	0	5	–	6	–	0
SMU	3	–	4	–	0	4	–	7	–	0
Rice	2	–	4	–	1	3	–	7	–	1
Texas Tech	2	–	5	–	0	4	–	7	–	0
Baylor	0	–	7	–	0	1	–	9	–	0
$ – Conference champion; Rankings from AP Poll

1972 Southwest Conference football standings
	Conf.					Overall
Team	W		L		T	W		L		T
No. 3 Texas $	7	–	0	–	0	10	–	1	–	0
Texas Tech	4	–	3	–	0	8	–	4	–	0
SMU	4	–	3	–	0	7	–	4	–	0
Arkansas	3	–	4	–	0	6	–	5	–	0
Rice	3	–	4	–	0	5	–	5	–	1
Baylor	3	–	4	–	0	5	–	6	–	0
TCU	2	–	5	–	0	5	–	6	–	0
Texas A&M	2	–	5	–	0	3	–	8	–	0
$ – Conference champion; Rankings from AP Poll

1973 Southwest Conference football standings
	Conf.					Overall
Team	W		L		T	W		L		T
No. 14 Texas $	7	–	0	–	0	8	–	3	–	0
No. 11 Texas Tech	6	–	1	–	0	11	–	1	–	0
Rice	4	–	3	–	0	5	–	6	–	0
SMU	3	–	3	–	1	6	–	4	–	1
Arkansas	3	–	3	–	1	5	–	5	–	1
Texas A&M	3	–	4	–	0	5	–	6	–	0
TCU	1	–	6	–	0	3	–	8	–	0
Baylor	0	–	7	–	0	2	–	9	–	0
$ – Conference champion; Rankings from AP Poll

1974 Southwest Conference football standings
	Conf.					Overall
Team	W		L		T	W		L		T
No. 14 Baylor $	6	–	1	–	0	8	–	4	–	0
No. 17 Texas	5	–	2	–	0	8	–	4	–	0
No. 16 Texas A&M	5	–	2	–	0	8	–	3	–	0
Arkansas	3	–	3	–	1	6	–	4	–	1
SMU	3	–	3	–	1	6	–	4	–	1
Texas Tech	3	–	4	–	0	6	–	4	–	2
Rice	2	–	5	–	0	2	–	8	–	1
TCU	0	–	7	–	0	1	–	10	–	0
$ – Conference champion; Rankings from AP Poll

1975 Southwest Conference football standings
	Conf.					Overall
Team	W		L		T	W		L		T
No. 7 Arkansas +	6	–	1	–	0	10	–	2	–	0
No. 6 Texas +	6	–	1	–	0	10	–	2	–	0
No. 11 Texas A&M +	6	–	1	–	0	10	–	2	–	0
Texas Tech	4	–	3	–	0	6	–	5	–	0
Baylor	2	–	5	–	0	3	–	6	–	2
SMU	2	–	5	–	0	4	–	7	–	0
Rice	1	–	6	–	0	2	–	9	–	0
TCU	1	–	6	–	0	1	–	10	–	0
+ – Conference co-champions; Rankings from AP Poll

1976 Southwest Conference football standings
	Conf.					Overall
Team	W		L		T	W		L		T
No. 4 Houston +	7	–	1	–	0	10	–	2	–	0
No. 13 Texas Tech +	7	–	1	–	0	10	–	2	–	0
No. 7 Texas A&M	6	–	2	–	0	10	–	2	–	0
Baylor	4	–	3	–	1	7	–	3	–	1
Texas	4	–	4	–	0	5	–	5	–	1
Arkansas	3	–	4	–	1	5	–	5	–	1
Rice	2	–	6	–	0	3	–	8	–	0
SMU	2	–	6	–	0	3	–	8	–	0
TCU	0	–	8	–	0	0	–	11	–	0
+ – Conference co-champions; Rankings from AP Poll

1977 Southwest Conference football standings
	Conf.					Overall
Team	W		L		T	W		L		T
No. 4 Texas $	8	–	0	–	0	11	–	1	–	0
No. 3 Arkansas	7	–	1	–	0	11	–	1	–	0
Texas A&M	6	–	2	–	0	8	–	4	–	0
Houston	4	–	4	–	0	6	–	5	–	0
Texas Tech	4	–	4	–	0	7	–	5	–	0
Baylor	3	–	5	–	0	5	–	6	–	0
SMU	3	–	5	–	0	4	–	7	–	0
TCU	1	–	7	–	0	2	–	9	–	0
Rice	0	–	8	–	0	1	–	10	–	0
$ – Conference champion; Rankings from AP Poll

1978 Southwest Conference football standings
	Conf.					Overall
Team	W		L		T	W		L		T
No. 10 Houston $	7	–	1	–	0	9	–	3	–	0
No. 11 Arkansas	6	–	2	–	0	9	–	2	–	1
No. 9 Texas	6	–	2	–	0	9	–	3	–	0
Texas Tech	5	–	3	–	0	7	–	4	–	0
No. 19 Texas A&M	4	–	4	–	0	8	–	4	–	0
SMU	3	–	5	–	0	4	–	6	–	1
Baylor	3	–	5	–	0	3	–	8	–	0
Rice	2	–	6	–	0	2	–	9	–	0
TCU	0	–	8	–	0	2	–	9	–	0
$ – Conference champion; Rankings from AP Poll

1979 Southwest Conference football standings
	Conf.					Overall
Team	W		L		T	W		L		T
No. 5 Houston +	7	–	1	–	0	11	–	1	–	0
No. 8 Arkansas +	7	–	1	–	0	10	–	2	–	0
No. 12 Texas	6	–	2	–	0	9	–	3	–	0
No. 14 Baylor	5	–	3	–	0	8	–	4	–	0
Texas A&M	4	–	4	–	0	6	–	5	–	0
SMU	3	–	5	–	0	5	–	6	–	0
Texas Tech	2	–	5	–	1	3	–	6	–	2
TCU	1	–	6	–	1	2	–	8	–	1
Rice	0	–	8	–	0	1	–	10	–	0
+ – Conference co-champions; Rankings from AP Poll

1980 Southwest Conference football standings
	Conf.					Overall
Team	W		L		T	W		L		T
No. 14 Baylor $	8	–	0	–	0	10	–	2	–	0
No. 20 SMU	5	–	3	–	0	8	–	4	–	0
Houston	5	–	3	–	0	7	–	5	–	0
Texas	4	–	4	–	0	7	–	5	–	0
Rice	4	–	4	–	0	5	–	6	–	0
Arkansas	3	–	5	–	0	7	–	5	–	0
Texas A&M	3	–	5	–	0	4	–	7	–	0
Texas Tech	3	–	5	–	0	5	–	6	–	0
TCU	1	–	7	–	0	1	–	10	–	0
$ – Conference champion; Rankings from AP Poll

1981 Southwest Conference football standings
	Conf.					Overall
Team	W		L		T	W		L		T
No. 5 SMU $	7	–	1	–	0	10	–	1	–	0
No. 2 Texas	6	–	1	–	1	10	–	1	–	1
Houston	5	–	2	–	1	7	–	4	–	1
Arkansas	5	–	3	–	0	8	–	4	–	0
Texas A&M	4	–	4	–	0	7	–	5	–	0
Rice	3	–	5	–	0	4	–	7	–	0
Baylor	3	–	5	–	0	5	–	6	–	0
TCU	1	–	6	–	1	2	–	7	–	2
Texas Tech	0	–	7	–	1	1	–	9	–	1
$ – Conference champion; Rankings from AP Poll

1982 Southwest Conference football standings
	Conf.					Overall
Team	W		L		T	W		L		T
No. 2 SMU $	7	–	0	–	1	11	–	0	–	1
No. 17 Texas	7	–	1	–	0	9	–	3	–	0
No. 9 Arkansas	5	–	2	–	1	9	–	2	–	1
Houston	4	–	3	–	1	5	–	5	–	1
Baylor	3	–	4	–	1	4	–	6	–	1
Texas Tech	3	–	5	–	0	4	–	7	–	0
Texas A&M	3	–	5	–	0	5	–	6	–	0
TCU	2	–	6	–	0	3	–	8	–	0
Rice	0	–	8	–	0	0	–	11	–	0
$ – Conference champion; Rankings from AP Poll

1983 Southwest Conference football standings
	Conf.					Overall
Team	W		L		T	W		L		T
No. 5 Texas $	8	–	0	–	0	11	–	1	–	0
No. 12 SMU	7	–	1	–	0	10	–	2	–	0
Baylor	4	–	3	–	1	7	–	4	–	1
Texas A&M	4	–	3	–	1	5	–	5	–	1
Arkansas	4	–	4	–	0	6	–	5	–	0
Texas Tech	3	–	4	–	1	3	–	7	–	1
Houston	3	–	5	–	0	4	–	7	–	0
TCU	1	–	6	–	1	1	–	8	–	2
Rice	0	–	8	–	0	1	–	10	–	0
$ – Conference champion; Rankings from AP Poll

1984 Southwest Conference football standings
	Conf.					Overall
Team	W		L		T	W		L		T
No. 8 SMU +	6	–	2	–	0	10	–	2	–	0
Houston +	6	–	2	–	0	7	–	5	–	0
TCU	5	–	3	–	0	8	–	4	–	0
Arkansas	5	–	3	–	0	7	–	4	–	1
Texas	5	–	3	–	0	7	–	4	–	1
Baylor	4	–	4	–	0	5	–	6	–	0
Texas A&M	3	–	5	–	0	6	–	5	–	0
Texas Tech	2	–	6	–	0	4	–	7	–	0
Rice	0	–	8	–	0	1	–	10	–	0
+ – Conference co-champions; Rankings from AP Poll

1985 Southwest Conference football standings
	Conf.					Overall
Team	W		L		T	W		L		T
No. 6 Texas A&M $	7	–	1	–	0	10	–	2	–	0
No. 12 Arkansas	6	–	2	–	0	10	–	2	–	0
No. 17 Baylor	6	–	2	–	0	9	–	3	–	0
Texas	6	–	2	–	0	8	–	4	–	0
SMU	5	–	3	–	0	6	–	5	–	0
Houston	3	–	5	–	0	4	–	7	–	0
Rice	2	–	6	–	0	3	–	8	–	0
Texas Tech	1	–	7	–	0	4	–	7	–	0
TCU	0	–	8	–	0	3	–	8	–	0
$ – Conference champion; Rankings from AP Poll

1986 Southwest Conference football standings
	Conf.					Overall
Team	W		L		T	W		L		T
No. 13 Texas A&M $	7	–	1	–	0	9	–	3	–	0
No. 15 Arkansas	6	–	2	–	0	9	–	3	–	0
No. 12 Baylor	6	–	2	–	0	9	–	3	–	0
Texas Tech	5	–	3	–	0	7	–	5	–	0
SMU	5	–	3	–	0	6	–	5	–	0
Texas	4	–	4	–	0	5	–	6	–	0
Rice	2	–	6	–	0	4	–	7	–	0
TCU	1	–	7	–	0	3	–	8	–	0
Houston	0	–	8	–	0	1	–	10	–	0
$ – Conference champion; Rankings from AP Poll

1987 Southwest Conference football standings
	Conf.					Overall
Team	W		L		T	W		L		T
No. 10 Texas A&M $	6	–	1	–	0	10	–	2	–	0
Arkansas	5	–	2	–	0	9	–	4	–	0
Texas	5	–	2	–	0	7	–	5	–	0
Texas Tech	3	–	3	–	1	6	–	4	–	1
Baylor	3	–	4	–	0	6	–	5	–	0
TCU	3	–	4	–	0	5	–	6	–	0
Houston	2	–	4	–	1	4	–	6	–	1
Rice	0	–	8	–	0	2	–	9	–	0
$ – Conference champion; Rankings from AP Poll

1988 Southwest Conference football standings
	Conf.					Overall
Team	W		L		T	W		L		T
No. 12 Arkansas $	7	–	0	–	0	10	–	2	–	0
Texas A&M*	6	–	1	–	0	7	–	5	–	0
No. 18 Houston	5	–	2	–	0	9	–	3	–	0
Texas Tech	4	–	3	–	0	5	–	6	–	0
Baylor	2	–	5	–	0	6	–	5	–	0
Texas	2	–	5	–	0	4	–	7	–	0
TCU	2	–	5	–	0	4	–	7	–	0
Rice	0	–	7	–	0	0	–	11	–	0
$ – Conference champion; *- Ineligible for conference championship and postseason bowl games due to NCAA sanctions.; Rankings from AP Poll

1989 Southwest Conference football standings
	Conf.					Overall
Team	W		L		T	W		L		T
No. 13 Arkansas $	7	–	1	–	0	10	–	2	–	0
No. 20 Texas A&M	6	–	2	–	0	8	–	4	–	0
No. 14 Houston	6	–	2	–	0	9	–	2	–	0
No. 19 Texas Tech	5	–	3	–	0	9	–	3	–	0
Baylor	4	–	4	–	0	5	–	6	–	0
Texas	4	–	4	–	0	5	–	6	–	0
TCU	2	–	6	–	0	4	–	7	–	0
Rice	2	–	6	–	0	2	–	8	–	1
SMU	0	–	8	–	0	2	–	9	–	0
$ – Conference champion; Rankings from AP Poll

1990 Southwest Conference football standings
	Conf.					Overall
Team	W		L		T	W		L		T
No. 12 Texas $	8	–	0	–	0	10	–	2	–	0
No. 10 Houston	7	–	1	–	0	10	–	1	–	0
No. 15 Texas A&M	5	–	2	–	1	9	–	3	–	1
Baylor	5	–	2	–	1	6	–	4	–	1
Rice	3	–	5	–	0	5	–	6	–	0
TCU	3	–	5	–	0	5	–	6	–	0
Texas Tech	3	–	5	–	0	4	–	7	–	0
Arkansas	1	–	7	–	0	3	–	8	–	0
SMU	0	–	8	–	0	1	–	10	–	0
$ – Conference champion; Rankings from AP Poll

1991 Southwest Conference football standings
	Conf.					Overall
Team	W		L		T	W		L		T
No. 12 Texas A&M $	8	–	0	–	0	10	–	2	–	0
Baylor	5	–	3	–	0	8	–	4	–	0
Texas Tech	5	–	3	–	0	6	–	5	–	0
Arkansas	5	–	3	–	0	6	–	6	–	0
TCU	4	–	4	–	0	7	–	4	–	0
Texas	4	–	4	–	0	5	–	6	–	0
Houston	3	–	5	–	0	4	–	7	–	0
Rice	2	–	6	–	0	4	–	7	–	0
SMU	0	–	8	–	0	1	–	10	–	0
$ – Conference champion; Rankings from AP Poll

1992 Southwest Conference football standings
	Conf.					Overall
Team	W		L		T	W		L		T
No. 7 Texas A&M $	7	–	0	–	0	12	–	1	–	0
Baylor	4	–	3	–	0	7	–	5	–	0
Rice	4	–	3	–	0	6	–	5	–	0
Texas	4	–	3	–	0	6	–	5	–	0
Texas Tech	4	–	3	–	0	5	–	6	–	0
SMU	2	–	5	–	0	5	–	6	–	0
Houston	2	–	5	–	0	4	–	7	–	0
TCU	1	–	6	–	0	2	–	8	–	1
$ – Conference champion; Rankings from AP Poll

1993 Southwest Conference football standings
	Conf.					Overall
Team	W		L		T	W		L		T
No. 9 Texas A&M $	7	–	0	–	0	10	–	2	–	0
Texas	5	–	2	–	0	5	–	5	–	1
Texas Tech	5	–	2	–	0	6	–	6	–	0
Rice	3	–	4	–	0	6	–	5	–	0
Baylor	3	–	4	–	0	5	–	6	–	0
TCU	2	–	5	–	0	4	–	7	–	0
SMU	1	–	5	–	1	2	–	7	–	2
Houston	1	–	5	–	1	1	–	9	–	1
$ – Conference champion; Rankings from AP Poll

1994 Southwest Conference football standings
	Conf.					Overall
Team	W		L		T	W		L		T
No. 8 Texas A&M *	6	–	0	–	1	10	–	0	–	1
No. 25 Texas +	4	–	3	–	0	8	–	4	–	0
Baylor +	4	–	3	–	0	7	–	5	–	0
TCU +	4	–	3	–	0	7	–	5	–	0
Texas Tech +	4	–	3	–	0	6	–	6	–	0
Rice +	4	–	3	–	0	5	–	6	–	0
Houston	1	–	6	–	0	1	–	10	–	0
SMU	0	–	6	–	1	1	–	9	–	1
+ – Conference co-champions; * – ineligible for championship and postseason due to NCAA sanctions; Rankings from AP Poll

1995 Southwest Conference football standings
	Conf.					Overall
Team	W		L		T	W		L		T
No. 14 Texas $	7	–	0	–	0	10	–	2	–	1
No. 15 Texas A&M	5	–	2	–	0	9	–	3	–	0
No. 23 Texas Tech	5	–	2	–	0	9	–	3	–	0
Baylor	5	–	2	–	0	7	–	4	–	0
TCU	3	–	4	–	0	6	–	5	–	0
Houston	2	–	5	–	0	2	–	9	–	0
Rice	1	–	6	–	0	2	–	8	–	1
SMU	0	–	7	–	0	1	–	10	–	0
$ – Conference champion; Rankings from AP Poll
