= 1918 Southwest Conference football season =

- Sport: Football
- Duration: September 28 – December 7, 1918
- Number of teams: 8
- Champion: none recognized

SWC seasons
- ← 1917 1919 →

1918 Southwest Conference football standings
	Conf.					Overall
Team	W		L		T	W		L		T
Texas	4	–	0	–	0	9	–	0	–	0
Oklahoma	2	–	0	–	0	6	–	0	–	0
Texas A&M	1	–	1	–	0	6	–	1	–	0
Rice	1	–	1	–	0	1	–	5	–	1
SMU	1	–	2	–	0	4	–	2	–	0
Arkansas	0	–	1	–	0	3	–	2	–	0
Oklahoma A&M	0	–	2	–	0	4	–	2	–	0
Baylor	0	–	2	–	0	0	–	6	–	0
No champion recognized; Rankings from AP Poll

The 1918 Southwest Conference football season was the fourth season of college football played by the member schools of the Southwest Conference (SWC) and was a part of the 1918 college football season. The Texas Longhorns finished in 1st place but, similar to 1916, were not recognized as conference champions for an unknown reason.

== Results and team statistics ==
Conf. rank	Team	Head coach	Overall record	Conf. record	PPG	PAG
1	Texas	William Juneau	9–0–0 (1.000)	4–0–0 (1.000)	21.6	1.6
2	Oklahoma	Bennie Owen	6–0–0 (1.000)	2–0–0 (1.000)	46.3	1.2
3	Texas A&M	D. V. Graves	6–1–0 (.857)	1–1–0 (.500)	17.6	2.7
4	Rice	John E. Anderson	1–5–1 (.214)	1–1–0 (.500)	1.9	8.9
5	SMU	J. Burton Rix	4–2–0 (.667)	1–2–0 (.333)	7.8	9.0
6	Arkansas	Norman C. Paine	3–2–0 (.600)	0–1–0 (.000)	8.2	24.2
7	Oklahoma A&M	Earl A. Pritchard	4–2–0 (.667)	0–2–0 (.000)	18.2	12.2
7	Baylor	Charles Mosley	0–6–0 (.000)	0–2–0 (.000)	3.2	15.3

Key
PPG = Average of points scored per game
PAG = Average of points allowed per game

== Schedules ==
Index to colors and formatting
Non-conference matchup; SWC member won
Non-conference matchup; SWC member lost
Non-conference matchup; tie
SWC teams in **bold**

=== Week One ===
Date	Visiting team	Home team	Site	Result	Attendance	Ref.
September 28	TCU	**Texas**	Clark Field • Austin, TX (rivalry)	**W** 19–0		

Week	No Game						
1	Oklahoma	Baylor	Rice	Texas A&M	Arkansas	Oklahoma A&M	SMU

=== Week Two ===
Date	Visiting team	Home team	Site	Result	Attendance	Ref.
October 5	Camp Logan	**Rice**	Rice Field • Houston, TX	**L** 0–10		
October 5	Haskell	**Oklahoma A&M**	Lewis Field • Stillwater, OK	**W** 19–6		

Week	No Game					
2	Texas	Oklahoma	Texas A&M	SMU	Arkansas	Baylor

=== Week Three ===
Date	Visiting team	Home team	Site	Result	Attendance	Ref.
October 12	Penn Radio School	**Texas**	Clark Field • Austin, TX	**W** 25–0		

Week	No Game					
3	Oklahoma	Texas A&M	SMU	Arkansas	Oklahoma A&M	Baylor

=== Week Four ===
Date	Visiting team	Home team	Site	Result	Attendance	Ref.
October 18	McArthur Field	**Baylor**	Carroll Field • Waco, TX	**L** 6–7		
October 19	Central State Normal	**Oklahoma**	Boyd Field • Norman, OK	**W** 44–0		
October 19	Park Place Flyers	**Rice**	Rice Field • Houston, TX	**L** 0–7		
October 19	Austin	**SMU**	Armstrong Field • Dallas, TX	**W** 19–0		

Week	No Game			
4	Texas	Texas A&M	Arkansas	Oklahoma A&M

=== Week Five ===
Date	Visiting team	Home team	Site	Result	Attendance	Ref.
October 26	Penn Radio School	**Texas**	Clark Field • Austin, TX	**W** 22–7		
October 26	Ream Field (TX)	**Texas A&M**	Kyle Field • College Station, TX	**W** 6-0		
October 26	Camp Logan	**Rice**	Rice Field • Houston, TX	**T** 0–0		
October 26	TCU	**SMU**	Armstrong Field • Dallas, TX (rivalry)	**W** 1–0 (forfeit)		
October 26	Barron Field	**Baylor**	Carroll Field • Waco, TX	**L** 0–27		

Week	No Game		
5	Oklahoma	Arkansas	Oklahoma A&M

=== Week Six ===
Date	Visiting team	Home team	Site	Result	Attendance	Ref.
November 2	Ream Field	Texas	Clark Field • Austin, TX	**W** 26–2		
November 2	Post Field	Oklahoma	Boyd Field • Norman, OK	**W** 58–0		
November 2	Camp Travis	Texas A&M	Kyle Field • College Station, TX	**W** 12-6		
November 2	Kelly Field	Rice	Rice Field • Houston, TX	**L** 0–28		
November 2	Love Field	SMU	Armstrong Field • Dallas, TX	**W** 6–0		
November 2	Camp Pike	Arkansas	The Hill • Fayetteville, AR	**L** 0–6		
November 2	Central State (OK)	Oklahoma A&M	Lewis Field • Stillwater, OK	**W** 26–6		

Week	No Game
6	Baylor

=== Week Seven ===
Date	Visiting team	Home team	Site	Result	Attendance	Ref.
November 9	**Oklahoma A&M**	**Texas**	Clark Field • Austin, TX	**UT** 27-5		
November 9	**Oklahoma**	Kansas	McCook Field • Lawrence, KS	**W** 33–0		
November 9	**Texas A&M**	**Baylor**	Cotton Palace • Waco, TX (rivalry)	**TAMU** 19–0		
November 9	Park Place Flyers	**Rice**	Rice Field • Houston, TX	**L** 0–3		
November 9	Missouri Mines	**Arkansas**	The Hill • Fayetteville, AR	**W** 7–0		

Week	No Game
7	SMU

=== Week Eight ===
Date	Visiting team	Home team	Site	Result	Attendance	Ref.
November 13	Camp Mabry	Texas	Clark Field • Austin, TX	**W** 22–0		
November 16	**Texas**	Rice	Rice Field • Houston, TX (rivalry)	**UT** 14–0		
November 16	**Arkansas**	Oklahoma	Boyd Field • Norman, OK	**OU** 103–0		
November 16	Southwestern (TX)	Texas A&M	Kyle Field • College Station, TX	**W** 7–0		
November 16	**Baylor**	SMU	Armstrong Field • Dallas, TX	**SMU** 14–0		
November 16	Fairmount	Oklahoma A&M	Lewis Field • Stillwater, OK	**W** 26–7		

=== Week Nine ===
Date	Visiting team	Home team	Site	Result	Attendance	Ref.
November 23	**SMU**	**Texas**	Clark Field • Austin, TX	**UT** 32–0		
November 23	**Oklahoma**	Phillips	Alton Field • Enid, OK	**W** 13–7		
November 23	Camp Mabry	**Texas A&M**	Kyle Field • College Station, TX	**W** 19–6		
November 23	Springfield Normal	**Arkansas**	The Hill • Fayetteville, AR	**W** 12-6		
November 23	**Oklahoma A&M**	Kendall	Lee school stadium • Tulsa, OK (rivalry)	**W** 34–0		
November 23	Southwestern (TX)	**Baylor**	Carroll Field • Waco, TX	**L** 6–14		

Week	No Game
9	Rice

=== Week Ten ===
Date	Visiting team	Home team	Site	Result	Attendance	Ref.
November 28	**Texas A&M**	**Texas**	Clark Field • Austin, TX	**UT** 7–0		
November 28	**Oklahoma A&M**	**Oklahoma**	Fair Park • Oklahoma City, OK (rivalry)	27–0	3,000	
November 28	**Arkansas**	Kendall	Kendall gridiron • Tulsa, OK	**W** 23–6		
November 28	TCU	**Baylor**	Carroll Field • Waco, TX (rivalry)	**L** 7-12		
November 30	**SMU**	**Rice**	Rice Field • Houston, TX (rivalry)	**RICE** 13-0		

=== Week Eleven ===
Date	Visiting team	Home team	Site	Result	Attendance	Ref.
December 7	Camp Travis Remount	**Texas A&M**	Kyle Field • College Station, TX	**W** 60–0		

Week	No Game						
11	Texas	Oklahoma	Rice	SMU	Arkansas	Oklahoma A&M	Baylor
