= 1919 TCU Horned Frogs football team =

American college football season

1919 TCU Horned Frogs football
- Conference: Texas Intercollegiate Athletic Association
- Record: 1–7 (1–4 TIAA)
- Head coach: Ted D. Hackney (1st season)
- Captain: Will Hill Acker
- Home stadium: TCU gridiron

1919 Texas Intercollegiate Athletic Association football standings
	Conf.					Overall
Team	W		L		T	W		L		T
Texas A&M $	7	–	0	–	0	10	–	0	–	0
Rice	6	–	1	–	0	8	–	1	–	0
Texas	4	–	1	–	0	6	–	4	–	0
Baylor	3	–	3	–	1	5	–	3	–	1
Howard Payne	2	–	3	–	0	6	–	3	–	0
Austin	2	–	3	–	0	4	–	3	–	1
SMU	2	–	4	–	1	5	–	4	–	1
Southwestern (TX)	2	–	5	–	0	3	–	5	–	0
TCU	1	–	4	–	0	1	–	7	–	0
Trinity (TX)	0	–	5	–	0	2	–	6	–	0
$ – Conference champion

The 1919 TCU Horned Frogs football team represented Texas Christian University (TCU) as a member of the Texas Intercollegiate Athletic Association (TIAA) during the 1919 college football season. Led by Ted D. Hackney in his first and only year as head coach, the Horned Frogs compiled an overall record of 1–7. The team's captain was Will Hill Acker, who played tackle.

== Schedule ==
Date	Opponent	Site	Result	Attendance	Source
October 4	North Texas State Normal*	TCU campus; Fort Worth, TX	L 6–14		
October 10	at Decatur Baptist*	Decatur, TX	L 0–20		
October 17	Oklahoma A&M*	TCU field; Fort Worth, TX	L 7–14		
October 25	Southwestern (TX)	Y. M. C. A. Park; Fort Worth, TX	L 0–10		
November 1	at Trinity (TX)	Waxahachie, TX	W 7–0		
November 7	at Austin	Sherman, TX	L 0–6		
November 15	Texas A&M	Y. M. C. A. Park; Fort Worth, TX (rivalry)	L 0–48		
November 27	Baylor	TCU campus; Fort Worth, TX (rivalry)	L 0–7	2,000	
*Non-conference game
