= List of Rice Owls football seasons =

The following is a list of Rice Owls football seasons for the football team that has represented Rice University in NCAA competition.

== Seasons ==
Year	Coach	Overall	Conference	Standing	Bowl/playoffs	Coaches^{#}	AP^{°}
Philip Arbuckle (Independent) (1912)
1912	Philip Arbuckle	3–2					
Philip Arbuckle (Texas Intercollegiate Athletic Association) (1913–1914)
1913	Philip Arbuckle	4–0					
1914	Philip Arbuckle	3–2–3					
Philip Arbuckle (Southwest Conference / Texas Intercollegiate Athletic Association) (1915–1917)
1915	Philip Arbuckle	5–3	1–2	6th			
1916	Philip Arbuckle	6–1–2	2–1	T–3rd			
1917	Philip Arbuckle	7–1	1–1	T–3rd			
John E. Anderson (Southwest Conference) (1918)
1918	John E. Anderson	1–5–1	1–1	T–3rd			
John E. Anderson:		1–5–1	1–1				
Philip Arbuckle (Southwest Conference / Texas Intercollegiate Athletic Association) (1919–1923)
1919	Philip Arbuckle	8–1	3–1	2nd			
1920	Philip Arbuckle	4–2–2	2–2–1	4th			
1921	Philip Arbuckle	4–4–1	1–2–1 / 3–0	6th / 1st			
1922	Philip Arbuckle	4–4	1–4 / 1–0	7th			
1923	Philip Arbuckle	3–5	1–4 / 2–1	7th / T–3rd			
Philip Arbuckle:		51–25–8	18–18–2				
John Heisman (Southwest Conference / Texas Intercollegiate Athletic Association) (1924)
1924	John Heisman	4–4	2–2 / 2–1	T–3rd / T–3rd			
John Heisman (Southwest Conference) (1925–1927)
1925	John Heisman	4–4–1	1–2–1	5th			
1926	John Heisman	4–4–1	0–4	7th			
1927	John Heisman	2–6–1	1–3	6th			
John Heisman:		14–18–3	6–12–1				
Claude Rothgeb (Southwest Conference) (1928)
1928	Claude Rothgeb	2–7	0–5	7th			
Claude Rothgeb:		2–7	0–5				
Jack Meagher (Southwest Conference) (1929–1933)
1929	Jack Meagher	2–7	0–5	7th			
1930	Jack Meagher	8–4	2–4	6th			
1931	Jack Meagher	6–4	3–3	4th			
1932	Jack Meagher	7–3	3–3	3rd			
1933	Jack Meagher	3–8	1–5	7th			
Jack Meagher:		26–26	9–20				
Jimmy Kitts (Southwest Conference) (1934–1939)
1934	Jimmy Kitts	9–1–1	5–1	1st			12
1935	Jimmy Kitts	8–3	3–3	T–3rd			
1936	Jimmy Kitts	5–7	1–5	T–6th			
1937	Jimmy Kitts	6–3–2	4–1–1	1st	W Cotton		18
1938	Jimmy Kitts	4–6	3–3	4th			
1939	Jimmy Kitts	1–9–1	0–5–1	7th			
Jimmy Kitts:		33–29–4	16–18–2				
Jess Neely (Southwest Conference) (1940–1966)
1940	Jess Neely	7–3	4–2	T–3rd			
1941	Jess Neely	6–3–1	3–2–1	4th			
1942	Jess Neely	7–2–1	4–1–1	2nd			
1943	Jess Neely	3–7	2–3	T–3rd			
1944	Jess Neely	5–6	2–3	T–4th			
1945	Jess Neely	5–6	3–3	T–3rd			
1946	Jess Neely	9–2	5–1	T–1st	W Orange		10
1947	Jess Neely	6–3–1	4–2	3rd			18
1948	Jess Neely	5–4–1	3–2–1	T–3rd			
1949	Jess Neely	10–1	6–0	1st	W Cotton		5
1950	Jess Neely	6–4	2–4	T–5th			
1951	Jess Neely	5–5	3–3	T–3rd			
1952	Jess Neely	5–5	4–2	2nd			
1953	Jess Neely	9–2	5–1	T–1st	W Cotton	6	6
1954	Jess Neely	7–3	4–2	T–3rd		19	19
1955	Jess Neely	2–7–1	0–6	7th			
1956	Jess Neely	4–6	1–5	5th			
1957	Jess Neely	7–4	5–1	1st	L Cotton	7	8
1958	Jess Neely	5–5	4–2	T–2nd			
1959	Jess Neely	1–7–2	1–4–1	6th			
1960	Jess Neely	7–4	5–2	T–2nd	L Sugar		
1961	Jess Neely	7–4	5–2	3rd	L Bluebonnet		
1962	Jess Neely	2–6–2	2–4–1	6th			
1963	Jess Neely	6–4	4–3	3rd			
1964	Jess Neely	4–5–1	3–3–1	T–4th			
1965	Jess Neely	2–8	1–6	T–7th			
1966	Jess Neely	2–8	1–6	8th			
Jess Neely:		144–124–10	86–75–6				
Bo Hagan (Southwest Conference) (1967–1970)
1967	Bo Hagan	4–6	2–5	7th			
1968	Bo Hagan	0–9–1	0–7	8th			
1969	Bo Hagan	3–7	2–5	T–6th			
1970	Bo Hagan	5–5	3–4	T–4th			
Bo Hagan:		12–27–1	7–21				
Bill Peterson (Southwest Conference) (1971)
1971	Bill Peterson	3–7–1	2–4–1	6th			
Bill Peterson:		3–7–1	2–4–1				
Al Conover (Southwest Conference) (1972–1975)
1972	Al Conover	5–5–1	3–4	T–4th			
1973	Al Conover	5–6	4–3	3rd			
1974	Al Conover	2–8–1	2–5	7th			
1975	Al Conover	2–9†	1–6	T–7th			
Al Conover:		14–28–2†	10–18				
Homer Rice (Southwest Conference) (1976–1977)
1976	Homer Rice	3–8	2–6	T–7th			
1977	Homer Rice	1–10	0–8	9th			
Homer Rice:		4–18	2–14				
Ray Alborn (Southwest Conference) (1978–1983)
1978	Ray Alborn	2–9	2–6	8th			
1979	Ray Alborn	1–10	0–8	9th			
1980	Ray Alborn	5–6	4–4	T–4th			
1981	Ray Alborn	4–7	3–5	T–6th			
1982	Ray Alborn	0–11	0–8	9th			
1983	Ray Alborn	1–10	0–8	9th			
Ray Alborn:		13–53	8–40				
Watson Brown (Southwest Conference) (1984–1985)
1984	Watson Brown	1–10	0–8	9th			
1985	Watson Brown	3–8	2–6	7th			
Watson Brown:		4–18	2–14				
Jerry Berndt (Southwest Conference) (1986–1988)
1986	Jerry Berndt	4–7	2–6	7th			
1987	Jerry Berndt	2–9	0–7	8th			
1988	Jerry Berndt	0–11	0–7	8th			
Jerry Berndt:		6–27	2–20				
Fred Goldsmith (Southwest Conference) (1989–1993)
1989	Fred Goldsmith	2–8–1	2–6	T–7th			
1990	Fred Goldsmith	5–6	3–5	T–5th			
1991	Fred Goldsmith	4–7	2–6	8th			
1992	Fred Goldsmith	6–5	4–3	T–2nd			
1993	Fred Goldsmith	6–5	3–4	T–4th			
Fred Goldsmith:		23–31–1	14–24				
Ken Hatfield (Southwest Conference) (1994–1995)
1994	Ken Hatfield	5–6	4–3	T–1st			
1995	Ken Hatfield	2–8–1	1–6	7th			
Ken Hatfield (Western Athletic Conference) (1996–2004)
1996	Ken Hatfield	7–4	6–2	T–2nd (Mountain)			
1997	Ken Hatfield	7–4	5–3	T–2nd (Mountain)			
1998	Ken Hatfield	5–6	5–3	T–3rd (Mountain)			
1999	Ken Hatfield	5–6	4–3	4th			
2000	Ken Hatfield	3–8	2–6	T–6th			
2001	Ken Hatfield	8–4	5–3	T–4th			
2002	Ken Hatfield	4–7	3–5	T–6th			
2003	Ken Hatfield	5–7	5–3	T–4th			
2004	Ken Hatfield	3–8	2–6	9th			
Ken Hatfield (Conference USA) (2005)
2005	Ken Hatfield	1–10	1–7	T–5th (West)			
Ken Hatfield:		55–78–1	43–50				
Todd Graham (Conference USA) (2006)
2006	Todd Graham	7–6	6–2	2nd (West)			
Todd Graham:		7–6	6–2				
David Bailiff (Conference USA) (2007–2017)
2007	David Bailiff	3–9	3–5	5th (West)			
2008	David Bailiff	10–3	7–1	T–1st (West)	W Texas		
2009	David Bailiff	2–10	2–6	T–5th (West)			
2010	David Bailiff	4–8	3–5	T–4th (West)			
2011	David Bailiff	4–8	3–5	4th (West)			
2012	David Bailiff	7–6	4–4	T–3rd (West)	W Armed Forces		
2013	David Bailiff	10–4	7–1	1st (West)	L Liberty		
2014	David Bailiff	8–5	5–3	T–2nd (West)	W Hawaii		
2015	David Bailiff	5–7	3–5	5th (West)			
2016	David Bailiff	3–9	2–6	T–5th (West)			
2017	David Bailiff	1–11	1–7	6th (West)			
David Bailiff:		57–80	40–48				
Mike Bloomgren (Conference USA) (2018–2022)
2018	Mike Bloomgren	2–11	1–7	T–6th (West)			
2019	Mike Bloomgren	3–9	3–5	T–4th (West)			
2020	Mike Bloomgren	2–3	2–3	5th (West)			
2021	Mike Bloomgren	4–8	3–5	5th (West)			
2022	Mike Bloomgren	5–8	3–5	T–7th	L LendingTree		
Mike Bloomgren (American Athletic Conference) (2023–2024)
2023	Mike Bloomgren	6–7	4–4	T–5th	L First Responder		
2024	Mike Bloomgren / Pete Alamar	4–8	3–5	T–9th			
Mike Bloomgren:		24–52	17–32				
Pete Alamar:		2–2	2–2				
Scott Abell (American Athletic Conference) (2025–present)
2025	Scott Abell	5–8	2–6	T–11th	L Armed Forces		
Scott Abell:		5–8	2–6				
Total:		501–668–32 (.430)					
National championship Conference title Conference division title or championship game berth
^{#}Rankings from final Coaches Poll.; ^{°}Rankings from final AP Poll.

† 3–8 in 1975 and 15–27–2 overall per NCAA due to forfeit win over Mississippi State.
