= 1917 Kendall Orange and Black football team =

American college football season

1917 Kendall Orange and Black football
- Conference: Oklahoma Intercollegiate Conference
- Record: 0–8–1 ( OIC)
- Head coach: Hal Mefford (1st season)
- Home stadium: Association Park

The 1917 Kendall Orange and Black football team represented Henry Kendall College (later renamed the University of Tulsa) during the 1917 college football season. In their first and only year under head coach Hal Mefford, the Orange and Black compiled a 0–8–1 record and were outscored by their opponents by a total of 221 to 61.

== Schedule ==
Date	Opponent	Site	Result	Source
October 6	Drury	Association Park; Tulsa, OK	L 13–14	
October 13	Haskell	Association Park; Tulsa, OK	L 7–12	
October 20	Pittsburg Normal	Association Park; Tulsa, OK	T 0–0	
October 27	at Arkansas	The Hill; Fayetteville, AR	L 7–19	
November 3	at Camp Funston	Camp Funston; Fort Riley, KS	L 6–15	
November 10	Denver	Association Park; Tulsa, OK	L 19–20	
November 17	at Oklahoma A&M	Lewis Field; Stillwater, OK (rivalry)	L 2–41	
November 24	at Oklahoma	Boyd Field; Norman, OK	L 0–80	
November 29	Phillips	Association Park; Tulsa, OK	L 7–20	
