= 1919 Kendall Orange and Black football team =

American college football season

1919 Kendall Orange and Black football

OIC champion
- Conference: Oklahoma Intercollegiate Conference
- Record: 8–0–1 (5–0–1 OIC)
- Head coach: Francis Schmidt (1st season)
- Home stadium: McNulty Park

The 1919 Kendall Orange and Black football team represented Henry Kendall College, which was renamed the University of Tulsa on 1920, during the 1919 college football season. In their first year under head coach Francis Schmidt, the Orange and Black compiled an 8–0–1 record, won the Oklahoma Intercollegiate Conference championship, and outscored their opponents by a total of 591 to 27. The team opened the season with a 152–0 victory over Oklahoma Baptist and shut out five of nine opponents. Schmidt was later inducted into the College Football Hall of Fame.

== Schedule ==
Date	Opponent	Site	Result	Source
September 27	Oklahoma Baptist	McNulty Park; Tulsa, OK	W 155–0	
October 4	East Central	McNulty Park; Tulsa, OK	W 60–0	
October 11	at Oklahoma	Boyd Field; Norman, OK	W 27–0	
October 18	Central State Teachers	McNulty Park; Tulsa, OK	W 67–6	
October 25	Northwestern Oklahoma State	McNulty Park; Tulsa, OK	W 75–0	
November 1	at Arkansas*	The Hill; Fayetteville, AR	W 63–7	
November 8	Trinity (TX)*	McNulty Park; Tulsa, OK	W 70–0	
November 15	Burleson College*	McNulty Park; Tulsa, OK	W 70–7	
November 21	at Oklahoma A&M	Lewis Field; Stillwater, OK (rivalry)	T 7–7	
*Non-conference game
