= William Murrah =

American football player (1900–1956)

Profile
- Position: Offensive lineman

Personal information
- Born: September 5, 1900; Plano, Texas, U.S.
- Died: June 1, 1956 (aged 55); San Antonio, Texas, U.S.
- Listed height: 5 ft 10 in (1.78 m)
- Listed weight: 215 lb (98 kg)

Career information
- College: Texas A&M University

Career history
- Canton Bulldogs (1922); St. Louis All-Stars (1923)

Awards and highlights
- NFL champion (1922); National champion (1919)
- Stats at Pro Football Reference

William Ervin "Cap" Murrah (September 5, 1900 – June 1, 1956) was a professional football player who spent two years of the National Football League (NFL) with the Canton Bulldogs and the St. Louis All-Stars. Murrah was a part of the Bulldogs' 1922 NFL championship team. In 1923, he played for the All-Stars. He played college football at Texas A&M University. Cap later was inducted into the Texas A&M Hall of Fame. While at A&M, Murrah helped the Aggies win the 1922 Dixie Classic, when he recovered the football at the Centre College Praying Colonels' thirty-three yard line, setting up a touchdown on the possession.
