= 1918 TCU Horned Frogs football team =

American college football season

1918 TCU Horned Frogs football
- Conference: Texas Intercollegiate Athletic Association
- Record: 4–3 (2–0 TIAA)
- Head coach: Ernest M. Tipton (1st season)
- Captain: Bryan Miller
- Home stadium: TCU gridiron

The 1918 TCU Horned Frogs football team represented Texas Christian University (TCU) as a member of the Texas Intercollegiate Athletic Association (TIAA) during the 1918 college football season. Led by Ernest M. Tipton in his first and only year as head coach, the Horned Frogs compiled an overall record of 4–3. The team's captain was Bryan Miller, who played quarterback

== Schedule ==
Date	Time	Opponent	Site	Result	Source
September 28		at Texas*	Clark Field; Austin, TX (rivalry)	L 0–19	
October 5	3:30 p.m.	Carruthers Field*	TCU gridiron; Fort Worth, TX	L 6–7	
October 26		at SMU	Armstrong Field; Dallas, TX	L 0–1 (forfeit)	
November 2		at Southwestern (TX)	Georgetown, TX	W 14–6	
November 9		North Texas State Normal*	TCU gridiron; Fort Worth, TX	W 39–0	
November 16		Austin	Fort Worth, TX	W 25–0	
November 28		at Baylor*	Carroll Field; Waco, TX (rivalry)	W 12–7	
*Non-conference game; All times are in Central time
