= Jack Mahan =

American javelin thrower (1898–1955)

John H. Mahan (July 22, 1898 – September 2, 1955) was an American track and field athlete who competed in the 1920 Summer Olympics. He was born in Gainesville, Texas.

Mahan a fullback and kicker on the national champion 1919 Texas A&M Aggies football team under head coach Dana X. Bible. Mahan also placed for the Texas A&M Aggies track and field team at the inaugural 1921 NCAA Track and Field Championships.

In 1920, he finished twelfth in the javelin throw competition.
