= Earl A. Pritchard =

American coach

Earl Pritchard
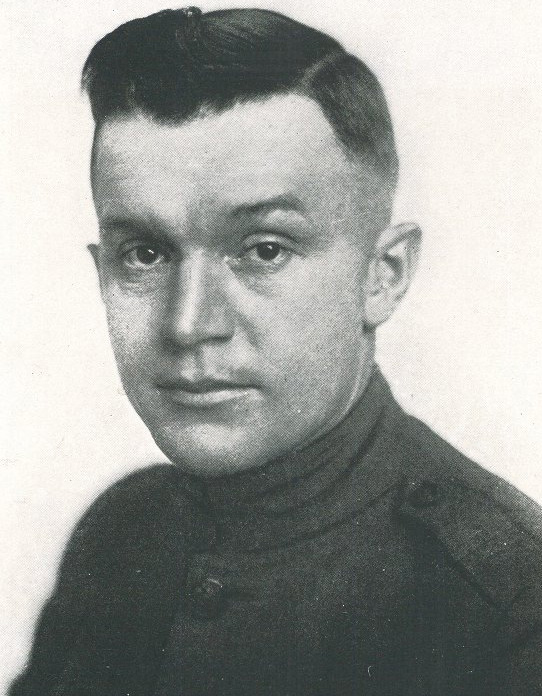
- Pritchard pictured in The Redskin 1919, OSU yearbook

Biographical details
- Born: October 6, 1884; Kansas City, Kansas, U.S.
- Died: January 20, 1951
- Education: University of Illinois

Coaching career (HC unless noted)

Football
- 1917–1918: Oklahoma A&M

Basketball
- 1917–1919: Oklahoma A&M

Baseball
- 1917–1918: Oklahoma A&M

Head coaching record
- Overall: 8–7 (football); 11–15 (basketball); 3–13 (baseball)

Earl Adrel Pritchard (October 6, 1884 – January 20, 1951) was an American football, basketball, and baseball coach.

He served as the head football coach at Oklahoma Agricultural and Mechanical College, now Oklahoma State University–Stillwater, for two seasons, from 1917 to 1918, compiling record of 8–7. Oklahoma A&M was then a member of the Southwest Conference. On Thanksgiving weekend of 1917, Pritchard led the Aggies to a 9–0 victory over their in-state rivals, the Oklahoma Sooners. Pritchard was also the head basketball coach at Oklahoma A&M from 1917 to 1919, tallying a mark of 11–15, and the head baseball coach at the school from 1917 to 1918, notching a record of 3–13.

== Head coaching record ==
=== Football ===
Year	Team	Overall	Conference	Standing
Oklahoma A&M Aggies (Southwest Conference) (1917–1918)
1917	Oklahoma A&M	4–5	1–2	T–5th
1918	Oklahoma A&M	4–2	0–2	T–7th
Oklahoma A&M:		8–7	1–4	
Total:		8–7		
