= Hal Mefford =

American football player and sports coach (1882–1932)

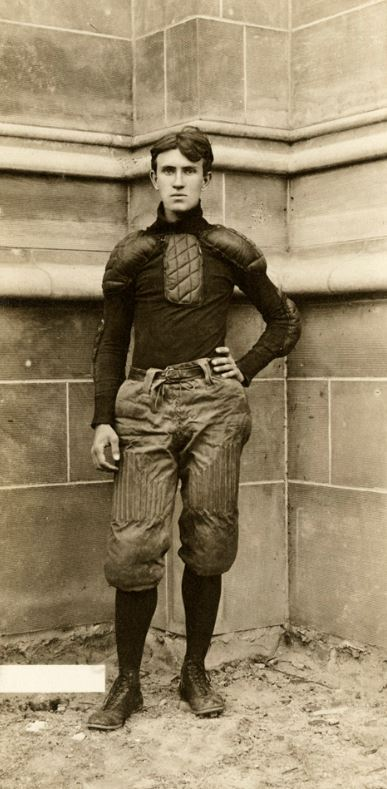

Biographical details
- Born: June 18, 1882; Robinson, Illinois, U.S.
- Died: December 24, 1932 (aged 50); Palestine, Illinois, U.S.

Playing career

Football
- 1904–1906: Chicago
- Positions: End, halfback

Coaching career (HC unless noted)

Football
- 1916: Rose Polytechnic
- 1917: Kendall

Basketball
- 1917–1918: Kendall

Head coaching record
- Overall: 2–14–1 (football); 1–5 (basketball)

Accomplishments and honors

Championships
- National (1905)

Harry Lee "Hal" Mefford (June 18, 1882 – December 24, 1932) was an American football player, coach of football and basketball, and college athletics administrator.

Mefford played for the Chicago Maroons football team, principally at the end position, in 1905 and 1906.

Mefford was hired in January 1916 as athletic director of the Rose Polytechnic Institute in Terre Haute, Indiana. He was the school's first athletic director. He was also the head football coach at Rose Poly for the 1916 season.

Mefford was the head football and basketball coach and athletic director at Henry Kendall College (later renamed the University of Tulsa) during the 1917–18 academic year. In his only season as the head coach, the Kendall football team compiled a 0–8–1 record and were outscored by their opponents by a total of 221 to 61. He resigned his position as Kendall's coach in February 1918.

He also spent a year in the diplomatic service as a consular agent in Germany in 1904. He later entered the sporting goods business in Robinson, Illinois. He died in December 1932 at age 50 at the Ikemire Clinic in Palestine, Illinois after two years of failing health.

== Head coaching record ==
=== Football ===
Year	Team	Overall	Conference	Standing	Bowl/playoffs
Rose Polytechnic (Independent) (1916)
1916	Rose Polytechnic	2–6			
Rose Polytechnic:		2–6			
Kendall Orange and Black (Oklahoma Intercollegiate Conference) (1917)
1917	Kendall	0–8–1			
Kendall:		0–8–1			
Total:		2–14–1			

=== Basketball ===
Record table
Season	Team	Overall	Conference	Standing	Postseason
Kendall Orange and Black (Oklahoma Intercollegiate Conference) (1917–1918)
1917–18	Kendall	1–6			
Kendall:		1–6 (.143)			
Total:		1–6 (.143)			
