= 1918 Texas Longhorns football team =

American college football season

1918 Texas Longhorns football

SWC champion TIAA champion
- Conference: Southwest Conference
- Record: 9–0 (4–0 SWC)
- Head coach: William Juneau (2nd season)
- Captain: Dave Pena
- Home stadium: Clark Field

1918 Southwest Conference football standings
	Conf.					Overall
Team	W		L		T	W		L		T
Texas	4	–	0	–	0	9	–	0	–	0
Oklahoma	2	–	0	–	0	6	–	0	–	0
Texas A&M	1	–	1	–	0	6	–	1	–	0
Rice	1	–	1	–	0	1	–	5	–	1
SMU	1	–	2	–	0	4	–	2	–	0
Arkansas	0	–	1	–	0	3	–	2	–	0
Oklahoma A&M	0	–	2	–	0	4	–	2	–	0
Baylor	0	–	2	–	0	0	–	6	–	0
No champion recognized; Rankings from AP Poll

The 1918 Texas Longhorns football team was an American football team that represented the University of Texas (now known as the University of Texas at Austin) as a member of the Southwest Conference (SWC) during the 1918 college football season. In their second year under head coach William Juneau, the Longhorns compiled an overall record of 9–0, and 4–0 in conference, and finished as SWC champion.

== Schedule ==
Date	Opponent	Site	Result	Source
September 28	TCU*	Clark Field; Austin, TX (rivalry)	W 19–0	
October 12	Penn Radio School*	Clark Field; Austin, TX	W 25–0	
October 26	Penn Radio School*	Clark Field; Austin, TX	W 22–7	
November 2	Ream Field*	Clark Field; Austin, TX	W 26–2	
November 9	Oklahoma A&M	Clark Field; Austin, TX	W 27–5	
November 13	Camp Mabry*	Clark Field; Austin, TX	W 22–0	
November 16	at Rice	Rice Field; Houston, TX (rivalry)	W 14–0	
November 23	SMU	Clark Field; Austin, TX	W 32–0	
November 28	Texas A&M	Clark Field; Austin, TX (rivalry)	W 7–0	
*Non-conference game
