= 1919 Oklahoma Sooners football team =

American college football season

1919 Oklahoma Sooners football
- Conference: Southwest Conference
- Record: 5–2–3 (2–1 SWC)
- Head coach: Bennie Owen (15th season)
- Captain: Erl Deacon
- Home stadium: Boyd Field

1919 Southwest Conference football standings
	Conf.					Overall
Team	W		L		T	W		L		T
Texas A&M $	4	–	0	–	0	10	–	0	–	0
Rice	3	–	1	–	0	8	–	1	–	0
Oklahoma	2	–	1	–	0	5	–	2	–	3
Texas	3	–	2	–	0	6	–	3	–	0
Arkansas	1	–	2	–	0	3	–	4	–	0
SMU	0	–	2	–	1	5	–	4	–	1
Oklahoma A&M	0	–	2	–	0	3	–	3	–	2
Baylor	0	–	3	–	1	5	–	3	–	1
$ – Conference champion

The 1919 Oklahoma Sooners football team represented the University of Oklahoma in the 1919 college football season. In their 15th year under head coach Bennie Owen, the Sooners compiled a 5–2–3 record (2–1 against conference opponents), and outscored their opponents by a combined total of 275 to 63.

No Sooners were recognized as All-Americans.

Four Sooners received All-Southwest Conference honors: Paul Johnston, Hugh McDermott, Sol Swatek, Claude Tyler.

== Schedule ==
Date	Opponent	Site	Result	Source
September 27	Central State Teachers*	Boyd Field; Norman, OK	W 40–0	
October 4	Kingfisher*	Boyd Field; Norman, OK	W 157–0	
October 11	Kendall*	Boyd Field; Norman, OK	L 0–27	
October 18	Texas	Fair Park Stadium; Dallas, TX (rivalry)	W 12–7	
October 25	vs. Nebraska*	Rourke Park; Omaha, NE (rivalry)	T 7–7	
November 1	Missouri*	Boyd Field; Norman, OK (rivalry)	T 6–6	
November 8	at Kansas*	McCook Field; Lawrence, KS	T 0–0	
November 15	at Arkansas	The Hill; Fayetteville, AR	L 6–7	
November 22	at Kansas State*	Ahearn Field; Manhattan, KS	W 14–3	
November 27	vs. Oklahoma A&M	Western League Park; Oklahoma City, OK (Bedlam)	W 33–6	
*Non-conference game
