= 1917 Texas A&M Aggies football team =

American college football season

1917 Texas A&M Aggies football

SWC champion
- Conference: Southwest Conference
- Record: 8–0 (3–0 SWC)
- Head coach: Dana X. Bible (1st season)
- Home stadium: Kyle Field

1917 Southwest Conference football standings
	Conf.					Overall
Team	W		L		T	W		L		T
Texas A&M $	3	–	0	–	0	8	–	0	–	0
Baylor	2	–	1	–	0	6	–	2	–	1
Rice	1	–	1	–	0	7	–	1	–	0
Oklahoma	1	–	1	–	1	6	–	4	–	1
Texas	2	–	4	–	0	4	–	4	–	0
Oklahoma A&M	1	–	2	–	0	4	–	4	–	0
Arkansas	0	–	1	–	1	5	–	1	–	1
$ – Conference champion

The 1917 Texas A&M Aggies football team represented the Agricultural and Mechanical College of Texas (now known as Texas A&M University) as a member of the Southwest Conference (SWC) during the 1917 college football season. Led by first-year head coach Dana X. Bible, the Aggies compiled an overall record of 8–0, with a mark of 3–0 in conference play. Texas A&M played home games at Kyle Field in College Station, Texas.

== Schedule ==
Date	Opponent	Site	Result	Source
October 5	Austin*	Kyle Field; College Station, TX	W 66–0	
October 12	Dallas*	Kyle Field; College Station, TX	W 98–0	
October 22	Southwestern (TX)*	Kyle Field; College Station, TX	W 20–0	
October 27	vs. LSU*	League Park; San Antonio, TX (rivalry)	W 27–0	
November 2	Tulane*	Kyle Field; College Station, TX	W 35–0	
November 10	at Baylor	Cotton Palace; Waco, TX (rivalry)	W 7–0	
November 20	Texas	Kyle Field; College Station, TX (rivalry)	W 7–0	
November 29	at Rice	Rice Field; Houston, TX	W 10–0	
*Non-conference game
