= 1919 Baylor Bears football team =

American college football season

1919 Baylor Bears football
- Conference: Southwest Conference
- Record: 5–3–1 (0–3–1 SWC)
- Head coach: Charles Mosley (6th season)
- Captain: Howard C. Wilson
- Home stadium: Carroll Field, Cotton Palace

1919 Southwest Conference football standings
	Conf.					Overall
Team	W		L		T	W		L		T
Texas A&M $	4	–	0	–	0	10	–	0	–	0
Rice	3	–	1	–	0	8	–	1	–	0
Oklahoma	2	–	1	–	0	5	–	2	–	3
Texas	3	–	2	–	0	6	–	3	–	0
Arkansas	1	–	2	–	0	3	–	4	–	0
SMU	0	–	2	–	1	5	–	4	–	1
Oklahoma A&M	0	–	2	–	0	3	–	3	–	2
Baylor	0	–	3	–	1	5	–	3	–	1
$ – Conference champion

The 1919 Baylor Bears football team was an American football team that represented Baylor University as a member of the Southwest Conference (SWC) during the 1919 college football season. In its sixth season under head coach Charles Mosley, the team compiled a 5–3–1 record and was outscored by a total of 92 to 19.

== Schedule ==
Date	Opponent	Site	Result	Attendance	Source
October 4	Rusk Junior College*	Carroll Field; Waco, TX	W 61–0		
October 11	Rice	Carroll Field; Waco, TX	L 0–8		
October 17	Austin*	Carroll Field; Waco, TX	W 17–12		
October 25	at Texas	Clark Field; Austin, TX (rivalry)	L 13–29		
November 1	Southwestern (TX)*	Cotton Palace; Waco, TX	W 20–0		
November 8	Texas A&M	Cotton Palace; Waco, TX (rivalry)	L 0–10	> 12,000	
November 17	Sewanee*	Carroll Field; Waco, TX	W 21–7	8,000	
November 22	SMU	Carroll Field; Waco, TX	T 7–7		
November 27	TCU*	TCU campus; Fort Worth, TX (rivalry)	W 7–0	2,000	
*Non-conference game
