= Shirley Brick =

American football player (1898–1929)

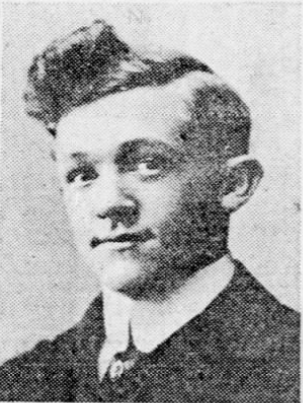
- Shirley Brick, c. 1915

Profile
- Position: End

Personal information
- Born: June 20, 1898; San Antonio, Texas, U.S.
- Died: January 3, 1929 (aged 30); Salamanca, New York, U.S.
- Listed height: 5 ft 8 in (1.73 m)
- Listed weight: 165 lb (75 kg)

Career information
- High school: North Side (TX)
- College: Rice

Career history
- Buffalo All-Americans (1920)

Career statistics
- Games played: 1
- Stats at Pro Football Reference

Shirley Eclipse Brick (June 20, 1898 – January 3, 1929) was an American football end who played college football for Rice and one game in the American Professional Football Association (APFA) for the Buffalo All-Americans.

== Early life and education ==
Shirley Brick was born on June 20, 1898, in San Antonio, Texas. He attended North Side High School in Fort Worth, Texas, and was president of his class. At the time of his graduation, Brick was the youngest ever graduate of the school, at age 16, and also posted their highest average with 94.2. He joined Rice University in 1915, seeing immediate playing time as a freshman on the football team. Following his junior year, Brick was named first-team all-state at the left-end position. Shortly after the selection, the team unanimously elected him team captain for the 1918 season. An article in The Houston Post said the following:

Not a few critic[s] call Shirley Brick the best end in Texas football. Hardly an all-state selection has or will be minus his name. If he is not the best he is so close to it that the difference is small. But his fellow players were thinking little of his playing when they chose him captain of the 1918 Owl team. The stocky little player is now in San Antonio and he is trying to get in th[e] aviation service ... Brick was away when his fellow players met last Tuesday night for a banquet. But his absence had nothing to do with the vote. It was unanimous. The Owls have never produced a more popular player. As he is a wonderful end, he is chock full of spirit.

Brick was a member of the Kelly Field military service team in 1918 rather than Rice, scoring two touchdowns in a victory against his former team.

He returned to Rice for his senior year of 1919, and named team captain after the resignation of Emmett McFarland. In addition to playing end, Brick handled the team's kicking duties.

== Professional career ==
After graduation, Brick was named assistant coach at his alma mater of Rice University; however, he changed his mind shortly before the season started. Instead, he moved to East Aurora, New York, and played professional football for the Buffalo All-Americans in the American Professional Football Association (APFA). Brick appeared in one game with the team, a 43–7 victory over the Columbus Panhandles as a substitute. He did not return to the team in 1921.

== Death ==
Brick was burned to death in a fire at Salamanca, New York, on January 3, 1929. He was 30 at the time of his death.
