= 1919 Texas A&M Aggies football team =

American college football season

1919 Texas A&M Aggies football
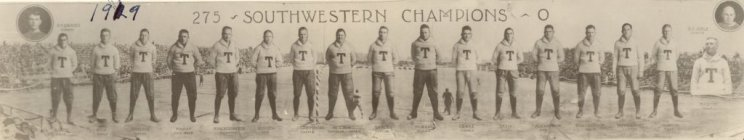

National champion (Billingsley MOV) Co-national champion (NCF) SWC champion TIAA champion
- Conference: Southwest Conference
- Record: 10–0 (4–0 SWC)
- Head coach: Dana X. Bible (2nd season)

1919 Southwest Conference football standings
	Conf.					Overall
Team	W		L		T	W		L		T
Texas A&M $	4	–	0	–	0	10	–	0	–	0
Rice	3	–	1	–	0	8	–	1	–	0
Oklahoma	2	–	1	–	0	5	–	2	–	3
Texas	3	–	2	–	0	6	–	3	–	0
Arkansas	1	–	2	–	0	3	–	4	–	0
SMU	0	–	2	–	1	5	–	4	–	1
Oklahoma A&M	0	–	2	–	0	3	–	3	–	2
Baylor	0	–	3	–	1	5	–	3	–	1
$ – Conference champion

1919 Texas Intercollegiate Athletic Association football standings
	Conf.					Overall
Team	W		L		T	W		L		T
Texas A&M $	7	–	0	–	0	10	–	0	–	0
Rice	6	–	1	–	0	8	–	1	–	0
Texas	4	–	1	–	0	6	–	4	–	0
Baylor	3	–	3	–	1	5	–	3	–	1
Howard Payne	2	–	3	–	0	6	–	3	–	0
Austin	2	–	3	–	0	4	–	3	–	1
SMU	2	–	4	–	1	5	–	4	–	1
Southwestern (TX)	2	–	5	–	0	3	–	5	–	0
TCU	1	–	4	–	0	1	–	7	–	0
Trinity (TX)	0	–	5	–	0	2	–	6	–	0
$ – Conference champion

The 1919 Texas A&M Aggies football team was an American football team that represented Texas A&M University in the Southwest Conference during the 1919 college football season. In their second season under head coach Dana X. Bible, the Aggies compiled a 10–0, won the Southwest Conference championship, did not allow a single point during the season, and outscored opponents by a total of 275 to 0. Texas A&M began the season with a doubleheader in College Station and scored a combined 105 points.

There was no contemporaneous system in 1919 for determining a national champion. However, Texas A&M was retroactively named as the national champion for 1919 by the Billingsley Report (using its alternate "margin of victory" methodology) and as a co-national champion with Harvard and Notre Dame by the National Championship Foundation.

== Schedule ==
Date	Opponent	Site	Result	Attendance	Source
October 3	Sam Houston Normal*	Kyle Field; College Station, TX	W 77–0		
October 3	Southwest Texas State*	Kyle Field; College Station, TX	W 28–0		
October 11	at SMU	Gardner Park; Dallas, TX	W 16–0		
October 18	Howard Payne*	Kyle Field; College Station, TX	W 12–0		
October 24	Trinity (TX)*	Kyle Field; College Station, TX	W 42–0		
November 1	Oklahoma A&M	Kyle Field; College Station, TX	W 28–0		
November 8	at Baylor	Cotton Palace; Waco, TX (Battle of the Brazos)	W 10–0	> 12,000	
November 15	at TCU*	Y. M. C. A. Park; Fort Worth, TX (rivalry)	W 48–0		
November 20	Southwestern (TX)*	Kyle Field; College Station, TX	W 7–0		
November 27	Texas	Kyle Field; College Station, TX (rivalry)	W 7–0	7,500	
*Non-conference game

== Roster ==
- Alexander, E
- Anglin, C
- Askey, FB
- Ballard, E
- Barnett, E
- Carruthers, T
- Davis, T
- Drake, T
- Frazier, FB
- R. Henry Harrison, HB
- Roswell G. Higginbotham, HB
- Keen, T
- King
- Arthur B. Knickerbocker, QB
- Jack Mahan, FB
- Martin, HB
- Morris, QB
- Murgen, G
- William Murrah, G
- Pattillo, G
- Jonnie Pierce, E
- Schudder, G
- Tom, T
- Touchstone, E
- Vandervoort, C
- Weir, HB
- Wendt, G
- Wilson, G
