= 1917 Oklahoma A&M Aggies football team =

American college football season

1917 Oklahoma A&M Aggies football
- Conference: Southwest Conference
- Record: 4–5 (1–2 SWC)
- Head coach: Earl A. Pritchard (1st season)
- Home stadium: Lewis Field

1917 Southwest Conference football standings
	Conf.					Overall
Team	W		L		T	W		L		T
Texas A&M $	3	–	0	–	0	8	–	0	–	0
Baylor	2	–	1	–	0	6	–	2	–	1
Rice	1	–	1	–	0	7	–	1	–	0
Oklahoma	1	–	1	–	1	6	–	4	–	1
Texas	2	–	4	–	0	4	–	4	–	0
Oklahoma A&M	1	–	2	–	0	4	–	4	–	0
Arkansas	0	–	1	–	1	5	–	1	–	1
$ – Conference champion

The 1917 Oklahoma A&M Aggies football team represented Oklahoma A&M College in the 1917 college football season. This was the 17th year of football at A&M and the first under Earl A. Pritchard. The Aggies played their home games at Lewis Field in Stillwater, Oklahoma. They finished the season 4–5 and 1–2 in the Southwest Conference.

== Schedule ==
Date	Opponent	Site	Result	Attendance	Source
October 6	at Kansas State*	Ahearn Field; Manhattan, KS	L 0–23		
October 13	Phillips*	Lewis Field; Stillwater, OK	L 0–6		
October 20	at Baylor	Carroll Field; Waco, TX	L 0–17		
October 27	Warrensburg Normal*	Lewis Field; Stillwater, OK	W 27–0		
November 3	at Central State Normal*	Edmond, OK	W 13–0		
November 10	at Texas	Clark Field; Austin, TX	L 3–7		
November 17	Kendall*	Lewis Field; Stillwater, OK (rivalry)	W 41–2		
November 24	at Camp MacArthur (32nd Infantry Division)*	Cotton Palace; Waco, TX	L 0–39		
November 29	vs. Oklahoma	Fair Park; Oklahoma City, OK (rivalry)	W 9–0	5,000	
*Non-conference game
