= 1917 Texas Longhorns football team =

American college football season

1917 Texas Longhorns football
- Conference: Southwest Conference
- Record: 4–4 (2–4 SWC)
- Head coach: William Juneau (1st season)
- Captain: Billy Trabue
- Home stadium: Clark Field

1917 Southwest Conference football standings
	Conf.					Overall
Team	W		L		T	W		L		T
Texas A&M $	3	–	0	–	0	8	–	0	–	0
Baylor	2	–	1	–	0	6	–	2	–	1
Rice	1	–	1	–	0	7	–	1	–	0
Oklahoma	1	–	1	–	1	6	–	4	–	1
Texas	2	–	4	–	0	4	–	4	–	0
Oklahoma A&M	1	–	2	–	0	4	–	4	–	0
Arkansas	0	–	1	–	1	5	–	1	–	1
$ – Conference champion

The 1917 Texas Longhorns football team was an American football team that represented the University of Texas (now known as the University of Texas at Austin) as a member of the Southwest Conference (SWC) during the 1917 college football season. In their first year under head coach William Juneau, the Longhorns compiled an overall record of 4–4, and 2–4 in the SWC.

== Schedule ==
Date	Opponent	Site	Result	Source
October 6	Trinity (TX)*	Clark Field; Austin, TX	W 27–0	
October 13	Southwestern (TX)*	Clark Field; Austin, TX	W 35–0	
October 20	vs. Oklahoma	Fair Park Stadium; Dallas, TX (rivalry)	L 0–14	
October 27	Rice	Clark Field; Austin, TX (rivalry)	L 0–13	
November 3	at Baylor	Carroll Field; Waco, TX (rivalry)	L 0–3	
November 10	Oklahoma A&M	Clark Field; Austin, TX	W 7–3	
November 20	at Texas A&M	Kyle Field; College Station, TX (rivalry)	L 0–7	
November 29	Arkansas	Clark Field; Austin, TX (rivalry)	W 20–0	
*Non-conference game
