= 1919 Oklahoma A&M Aggies football team =

American college football season

1919 Oklahoma A&M Aggies football
- Conference: Southwest Conference
- Record: 3–3–2 (0–2 SWC)
- Head coach: Jim Pixlee (1st season)
- Home stadium: Lewis Field

1919 Southwest Conference football standings
	Conf.					Overall
Team	W		L		T	W		L		T
Texas A&M $	4	–	0	–	0	10	–	0	–	0
Rice	3	–	1	–	0	8	–	1	–	0
Oklahoma	2	–	1	–	0	5	–	2	–	3
Texas	3	–	2	–	0	6	–	3	–	0
Arkansas	1	–	2	–	0	3	–	4	–	0
SMU	0	–	2	–	1	5	–	4	–	1
Oklahoma A&M	0	–	2	–	0	3	–	3	–	2
Baylor	0	–	3	–	1	5	–	3	–	1
$ – Conference champion

The 1919 Oklahoma A&M Aggies football team represented Oklahoma A&M College in the 1919 college football season. This was the 19th year of football at A&M and the second under Jim Pixlee. The Aggies played their home games at Lewis Field in Stillwater, Oklahoma. They finished the season 3–3–2 overall and 0–2 in the Southwest Conference.

== Schedule ==
Date	Opponent	Site	Result	Attendance	Source
October 4	Southwestern State (OK)*	Lewis Field; Stillwater, OK	W 37–0		
October 11	Haskell*	Lewis Field; Stillwater, OK	L 3–12		
October 17	at TCU*	TCU field; Fort Worth, TX	W 14–7		
November 1	at Texas A&M	Kyle Field; College Station, TX	L 0–28		
November 8	Central State Teachers*	Lewis Field; Stillwater, OK	W 52–0	3,000	
November 15	Phillips*	Lewis Field; Stillwater, OK	T 7–7		
November 21	Kendall*	Lewis Field; Stillwater, OK (rivalry)	T 7–7	5,000	
November 27	vs. Oklahoma	Western League Park; Oklahoma City, OK (Bedlam)	L 6–33		
*Non-conference game
