= 1919 Arkansas Razorbacks football team =

American college football season

1919 Arkansas Razorbacks football
- Conference: Southwest Conference
- Record: 3–4 (1–2 SWC)
- Head coach: James B. Craig (1st season)
- Captain: James W. Coleman
- Home stadium: The Hill

1919 Southwest Conference football standings
	Conf.					Overall
Team	W		L		T	W		L		T
Texas A&M $	4	–	0	–	0	10	–	0	–	0
Rice	3	–	1	–	0	8	–	1	–	0
Oklahoma	2	–	1	–	0	5	–	2	–	3
Texas	3	–	2	–	0	6	–	3	–	0
Arkansas	1	–	2	–	0	3	–	4	–	0
SMU	0	–	2	–	1	5	–	4	–	1
Oklahoma A&M	0	–	2	–	0	3	–	3	–	2
Baylor	0	–	3	–	1	5	–	3	–	1
$ – Conference champion

The 1919 Arkansas Razorbacks football team represented the University of Arkansas in the Southwest Conference (SWC) during the 1919 college football season. In their first and only year under head coach James B. Craig, the Razorbacks compiled a 3–4 record (1–2 against SWC opponents), finished in fifth place in the SWC, and were outscored by their opponents by a combined total of 164 to 55. After losing to Oklahoma by a 103–0 score in 1918, the Razorbacks defeated Oklahoma by a 7–6 score in Norman.

In August 1919, Arkansas hired Craig, a former All-American halfback at Michigan, as the school's athletic director and football and baseball coach. Craig had recently returned from military service in France. Under Craig's leadership, the Razorbacks football team suffered its first losing season since 1914. Craig served only one year, announcing his resignation in March 1920, effective at the end of the college year.

== Schedule ==
Date	Time	Opponent	Site	Result	Source
October 11		Hendrix*	The Hill; Fayetteville, AR	W 7–0	
October 18		Missouri Mines*	The Hill; Fayetteville, AR	W 20–0	
October 25		vs. LSU*	Fair Grounds; Shreveport, LA (rivalry)	L 0–20	
November 1		Kendall*	The Hill; Fayetteville, AR	L 7–63	
November 8		at Texas	Clark Field; Austin, TX (rivalry)	L 7–35	
November 15		Oklahoma	The Hill; Fayetteville, AR	W 7–6	
November 27	3:00 p.m.	at Rice	Rice Field; Houston, TX	L 7–40	
*Non-conference game; All times are in Central time
