= Will Hill Acker =

American football player and coach

Biographical details
- Born: December 17, 1899; Texas, U.S.
- Died: July 28, 1951 (aged 51); Greenville, Texas, U.S.

Playing career

Football
- 1918–1920: TCU
- Position: Tackle

Coaching career (HC unless noted)

Football
- 1922–1927: East Texas State (assistant)
- 1929–1930: East Texas State

Basketball
- 1928–1930: East Texas State

Administrative career (AD unless noted)
- 1930–1949: East Texas State

Head coaching record
- Overall: 2–13–1 (football); 49–19 (basketball)

Will Hill Acker (December 17, 1899 – July 28, 1951) was an American football player and coach and college athletics administrator. He served as the head football coach at East Texas State Teachers College—now known as East Texas A&M University—from 1929 to 1930. Acker was also head basketball coach at East Texas State from 1928 to 1930 and the school's athletic director from 1930 to 1949.

== Personal life ==
Acker was born December 17, 1899, in Ellis County, Texas, to Walter L. Acker and Pearl Hill.

In 1918, during World War I, Acker belonged to the Student Army Training Corps while at Christian College of North Texas.

Acker died on July 28, 1951, at a hospital in Greenville, Texas, from injuries he sustained four days earlier in an automobile accident.

== Head coaching record ==
=== Football ===
Year	Team	Overall	Conference	Standing	Bowl/playoffs
East Texas State Lions (Texas Intercollegiate Athletic Association) (1929–1930)
1929	East Texas State	0–6–1	0–3–1	9th	
1930	East Texas State	2–7	1–4	9th	
East Texas State:		2–13–1	1–7–1		
Total:		2–13–1			
