= 1917 Baylor Bears football team =

American college football season

1917 Baylor Bears football
- Conference: Southwest Conference
- Record: 6–2–1 (2–1 SWC)
- Head coach: Charles Mosley (4th season)
- Captain: Jack Roach
- Home stadium: Carroll Field

1917 Southwest Conference football standings
	Conf.					Overall
Team	W		L		T	W		L		T
Texas A&M $	3	–	0	–	0	8	–	0	–	0
Baylor	2	–	1	–	0	6	–	2	–	1
Rice	1	–	1	–	0	7	–	1	–	0
Oklahoma	1	–	1	–	1	6	–	4	–	1
Texas	2	–	4	–	0	4	–	4	–	0
Oklahoma A&M	1	–	2	–	0	4	–	4	–	0
Arkansas	0	–	1	–	1	5	–	1	–	1
$ – Conference champion

The 1917 Baylor Bears football team was an American football team that represented Baylor University as a member of the Southwest Conference (SWC) during the 1917 college football season. In its fourth season under head coach Charles Mosley, the team compiled a 6–2–1 record and outscored opponents by a total of 221 to 41.

== Schedule ==
Date	Opponent	Site	Result	Source
September 29	Howard Payne*	Carroll Field; Waco, TX	W 17–0	
October 13	vs. Trinity (TX)*	Fair Park; Dallas, TX	W 55–0	
October 20	Oklahoma A&M	Carroll Field; Waco, TX	W 17–0	
October 27	Simmons (TX)*	Carroll Field; Waco, TX	W 103–0	
November 3	Texas	Cotton Palace; Waco, TX (rivalry)	W 3–0	
November 10	Texas A&M	Cotton Palace; Waco, TX (rivalry)	L 0–7	
November 17	at SMU*	Armstrong Field; Dallas, TX	T 0–0	
November 23	at Southwestern (TX)*	Snyder Field; Georgetown, TX	W 26–0	
November 29	at TCU*	TCU gridiron; Fort Worth, TX (rivalry)	L 0–34	
*Non-conference game
