= 1917 Arkansas Razorbacks football team =

American college football season

1917 Arkansas Razorbacks football
- Conference: Southwest Conference
- Record: 5–1–1 (0–1–1 SWC)
- Head coach: Norman C. Paine (1st season)
- Captain: Gene Davidson
- Home stadium: The Hill

1917 Southwest Conference football standings
	Conf.					Overall
Team	W		L		T	W		L		T
Texas A&M $	3	–	0	–	0	8	–	0	–	0
Baylor	2	–	1	–	0	6	–	2	–	1
Rice	1	–	1	–	0	7	–	1	–	0
Oklahoma	1	–	1	–	1	6	–	4	–	1
Texas	2	–	4	–	0	4	–	4	–	0
Oklahoma A&M	1	–	2	–	0	4	–	4	–	0
Arkansas	0	–	1	–	1	5	–	1	–	1
$ – Conference champion

The 1917 Arkansas Razorbacks football team represented the University of Arkansas in the Southwest Conference (SWC) during the 1917 college football season. In their first year under head coach Norman C. Paine, the Razorbacks compiled a 5–1–1 record (0–1–1 against SWC opponents), finished in last place in the SWC, and outscored their opponents by a combined total of 125 to 36.

== Schedule ==
Date	Opponent	Site	Result	Source
October 6	Warrensburg Normal*	The Hill; Fayetteville, AR	W 34–9	
October 13	Hendrix*	The Hill; Fayetteville, AR	W 19–0	
October 20	Missouri Mines*	The Hill; Fayetteville, AR	W 39–0	
October 27	Kendall*	The Hill; Fayetteville, AR	W 19–7	
November 3	vs. LSU*	Fair Grounds; Shreveport, LA (rivalry)	W 14–0	
November 17	vs. Oklahoma	Fort Smith, AR	T 0–0	
November 29	at Texas	Clark Field; Austin, TX (rivalry)	L 0–20	
*Non-conference game
