= William Juneau =

American football player and coach (1879–1949)

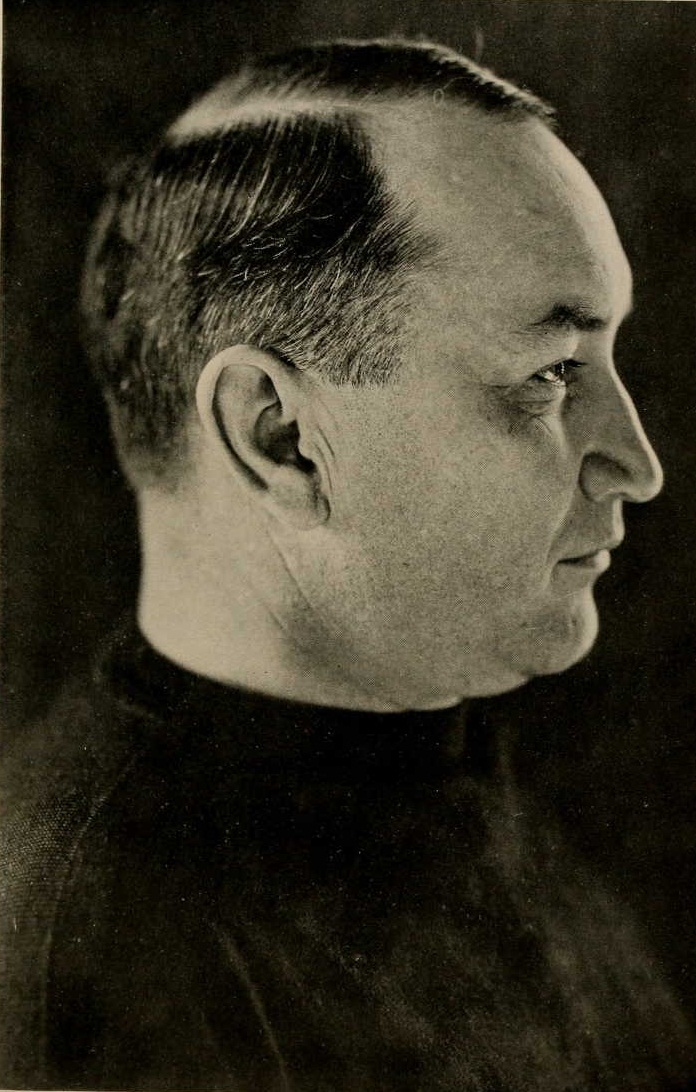
- Juneau from The Cactus, 1918

Biographical details
- Born: February 24, 1879; Milwaukee, Wisconsin, U.S.
- Died: October 9, 1949 (aged 70); Milwaukee, Wisconsin, U.S.

Playing career

Football
- 1899–1902: Wisconsin
- Positions: End, halfback

Coaching career (HC unless noted)

Football
- 1903: Fort Atkinson HS (WI)
- 1904: Colorado College
- 1906–1907: South Dakota State
- 1908–1911: Marquette
- 1912–1915: Wisconsin
- 1917–1919: Texas
- 1920–1922: Kentucky

Basketball
- 1905–1907: South Dakota State

Baseball
- 1906–1908: South Dakota State
- 1913: Wisconsin

Head coaching record
- Overall: 86–39–10 (college football); 7–5 (basketball); 15–12–1 (baseball)

Accomplishments and honors

Championships
- Football; 1 Western (1912); 1 SWC (1918)

William J. Juneau (February 24, 1879 – October 9, 1949) was an American football player and coach of football, basketball, and baseball. He served as the head football coach at Colorado College (1904), South Dakota State College of Agricultural and Mechanic Arts (1906–1907), Marquette University (1908–1911), the University of Wisconsin–Madison (1912–1915), the University of Texas at Austin (1917–1919), and the University of Kentucky (1920–1922), compiling a career college football record of 86–39–10. Juneau was also the head basketball coach at South Dakota State for two seasons from 1905 to 1907, tallying a mark of 7–5. He coached baseball at South Dakota State in 1906 and 1908 and at Wisconsin in 1913, amassing a career college baseball record of 15–12–1.

== Biography ==
Juneau was the grandnephew of Solomon Juneau (1793–1856), a fur trader, land speculator, and politician who helped found the city of Milwaukee, Wisconsin. Juneau played football at Wisconsin as an end and halfback from 1899 to 1902 and captained the Wisconsin Badgers football team in 1902. He began his coaching career in 1903 at Fort Atkinson High School in Fort Atkinson, Wisconsin. Juneau retired from coaching 1923 and entered the real estate business.

He died on October 9, 1949, at the age of 70 in Milwaukee, Wisconsin.

== Head coaching record ==
=== College football ===
Year	Team	Overall	Conference	Standing	Bowl/playoffs
Colorado College Tigers (Colorado Football Association) (1904)
1904	Colorado College	6–3–1	1–2–1	4th	
Colorado College:		6–3–1	1–2–1		
South Dakota State (Independent) (1906–1907)
1906	South Dakota State	3–1			
1907	South Dakota State	5–2			
South Dakota State:		8–3			
Marquette Blue and Gold (Independent) (1909–1911)
1908	Marquette	4–2–1			
1909	Marquette	2–2–1			
1910	Marquette	6–1–2			
1911	Marquette	7–0–2			
Marquette:		19–5–6			
Wisconsin Badgers (Western Conference) (1912–1915)
1912	Wisconsin	7–0	5–0	1st	
1913	Wisconsin	3–3–1	1–2–1	6th	
1914	Wisconsin	4–2–1	2–2–1	T–4th	
1915	Wisconsin	4–3	2–3	6th	
Wisconsin:		18–8–2	10–7–2		
Texas Longhorns (Southwest Conference) (1917–1919)
1917	Texas	4–4	2–4	T–5th	
1918	Texas	9–0	4–0	T–1st	
1919	Texas	6–3	3–2	4th	
Texas:		19–7	9–6		
Kentucky Wildcats (Southern Intercollegiate Athletic Association) (1920–1921)
1920	Kentucky	3–4–1	0–3–1	19th	
1921	Kentucky	4–3–1	1–3–1	20th	
Kentucky Wildcats (Southern Conference) (1922)
1922	Kentucky	6–3	1–2	T–11th	
Kentucky:		13–10–2	2–8–2		
Total:		86–39–10			
National championship Conference title Conference division title or championship game berth
