= 1918 Kendall Orange and Black football team =

American college football season

1918 Kendall Orange and Black football
- Conference: Oklahoma Intercollegiate Conference
- Record: 1–2 (1–0 OIC)
- Head coach: Arthur F. Smith (1st season)
- Home stadium: Lee school stadium, Kendall gridiron

The 1918 Kendall Orange and Black football team represented Henry Kendall College (later renamed the University of Tulsa) during the 1918 college football season. In their first and only year under head coach Arthur Smith, the Orange and Black compiled a 1–2 record and were outscored by their opponents by a total of 56 to 9.

== Schedule ==
Date	Time	Opponent	Site	Result	Source
November 2		at East Central	Ada, OK	W 3–0	
November 23	3:00 p.m.	Oklahoma A&M*	Lee school stadium; Tulsa, OK (rivalry)	L 0–34	
November 28		Arkansas*	Kendall gridiron; Tulsa, OK	L 6–23	
*Non-conference game; All times are in Central time
