= John E. Anderson (American football) =

American football player and coach

John Anderson
Playing career
- 1906–1907: Chicago
- Position: Center

Coaching career (HC unless noted)
- 1908: Chicago (assistant)
- 1910: Morgan Park Military Academy (IL)
- 1917: Knox (IL)
- 1918: Rice

Head coaching record
- Overall: 5–7–2 (college)

John Emil Anderson was an American football coach. He served as head football coach at Knox College in Galesburg, Illinois in 1917 and Rice University in 1918, compiling a career college football coaching record of 5–7–2. Anderson played college football at the University of Chicago under Amos Alonzo Stagg. He was an assistant coach at Chicago under Stagg in 1908 and coached at Morgan Park Military Academy in 1910.

== Head coaching record ==
Year	Team	Overall	Conference	Standing	Bowl/playoffs
Knox Old Siwash (Independent) (1917)
1917	Knox	4–2–1			
Knox:		4–2–1			
Rice Owls (Southwest Conference) (1918)
1918	Rice	1–5–1	1–1	T–3rd	
Rice:		1–5–1	1–1		
Total:		5–7–2			
