= 1918 Baylor Bears football team =

American college football season

1918 Baylor Bears football
- Conference: Southwest Conference
- Record: 0–6 (0–2 SWC)
- Head coach: Charles Mosley (5th season)
- Captain: Ross M. Sams
- Home stadium: Carroll Field

1918 Southwest Conference football standings
	Conf.					Overall
Team	W		L		T	W		L		T
Texas	4	–	0	–	0	9	–	0	–	0
Oklahoma	2	–	0	–	0	6	–	0	–	0
Texas A&M	1	–	1	–	0	6	–	1	–	0
Rice	1	–	1	–	0	1	–	5	–	1
SMU	1	–	2	–	0	4	–	2	–	0
Arkansas	0	–	1	–	0	3	–	2	–	0
Oklahoma A&M	0	–	2	–	0	4	–	2	–	0
Baylor	0	–	2	–	0	0	–	6	–	0
No champion recognized; Rankings from AP Poll

The 1918 Baylor Bears football team was an American football team that represented Baylor University as a member of the Southwest Conference (SWC) during the 1918 college football season. In its fifth season under head coach Charles Mosley, the team compiled a 0–6 record and was outscored by a total of 92 to 19.

== Schedule ==
Date	Opponent	Site	Result	Source
October 18	McArthur Field*	Carroll Field; Waco, TX	L 6–7	
October 26	Barron Field*	Carroll Field; Waco, TX	L 0–27	
November 9	Texas A&M	Cotton Palace; Waco, TX (rivalry)	L 0–19	
November 16	at SMU	Armstrong Field; University Park, TX	L 0–14	
November 23	Southwestern (TX)*	Carroll Field; Waco, TX	L 6–14	
November 28	TCU*	Carroll Field; Waco, TX (rivalry)	L 7–12	
*Non-conference game
