= 1918 Arkansas Razorbacks football team =

American college football season

1918 Arkansas Razorbacks football
- Conference: Southwest Conference
- Record: 3–2 (0–1 SWC)
- Head coach: Norman C. Paine (2nd season)
- Captain: Paul Gold
- Home stadium: The Hill

1918 Southwest Conference football standings
	Conf.					Overall
Team	W		L		T	W		L		T
Texas	4	–	0	–	0	9	–	0	–	0
Oklahoma	2	–	0	–	0	6	–	0	–	0
Texas A&M	1	–	1	–	0	6	–	1	–	0
Rice	1	–	1	–	0	1	–	5	–	1
SMU	1	–	2	–	0	4	–	2	–	0
Arkansas	0	–	1	–	0	3	–	2	–	0
Oklahoma A&M	0	–	2	–	0	4	–	2	–	0
Baylor	0	–	2	–	0	0	–	6	–	0
No champion recognized; Rankings from AP Poll

The 1918 Arkansas Razorbacks football team represented the University of Arkansas in the Southwest Conference (SWC) during the 1918 college football season. In their second and final year under head coach Norman C. Paine, the Razorbacks compiled a 3–2 record (0–1 against SWC opponents), finished in seventh place out of eight teams in the SWC, and were outscored by their opponents by a combined total of 121 to 42. The start of the season was delayed until November because of the Spanish flu. On November 16, the Razorbacks sustained the worst defeat in the program's history, losing to Oklahoma by a 103 to 0 score.

== Schedule ==
Date	Opponent	Site	Result	Source
November 2	Camp Pike*	The Hill; Fayetteville, AR	L 0–6	
November 9	Missouri Mines*	The Hill; Fayetteville, AR	W 7–0	
November 16	at Oklahoma	Boyd Field; Norman, OK	L 0–103	
November 23	Springfield Normal*	The Hill; Fayetteville, AR	W 12–6	
November 28	at Kendall*	Kendall gridiron; Tulsa, OK	W 23–6	
*Non-conference game
