= 1917 Oklahoma Sooners football team =

American college football season

1917 Oklahoma Sooners football
- Conference: Southwest Conference
- Record: 6–4–1 (1–1–1 SWC)
- Head coach: Bennie Owen (13th season)
- Captain: Frank McCain
- Home stadium: Boyd Field

1917 Southwest Conference football standings
	Conf.					Overall
Team	W		L		T	W		L		T
Texas A&M $	3	–	0	–	0	8	–	0	–	0
Baylor	2	–	1	–	0	6	–	2	–	1
Rice	1	–	1	–	0	7	–	1	–	0
Oklahoma	1	–	1	–	1	6	–	4	–	1
Texas	2	–	4	–	0	4	–	4	–	0
Oklahoma A&M	1	–	2	–	0	4	–	4	–	0
Arkansas	0	–	1	–	1	5	–	1	–	1
$ – Conference champion

The 1917 Oklahoma Sooners football team represented the University of Oklahoma in the 1917 college football season. In their 13th year under head coach Bennie Owen, the Sooners compiled a 6–4–1 record (1–1–1 against conference opponents), and outscored their opponents by a combined total of 451 to 103.

No Sooners were recognized as All-Americans.

Two Sooner received All-Southwest Conference honors: Walt Abbott and W.E. Durant.

== Schedule ==
Date	Opponent	Site	Result	Attendance	Source
September 22	vs. Central State Normal*	Fair Park; Oklahoma City, OK	W 99–0		
September 29	Kingfisher*	Boyd Field; Norman, OK	W 179–0		
October 6	Phillips*	Boyd Field; Norman, OK	W 52–9		
October 13	at Illinois*	Illinois Field; Champaign, IL	L 0–44		
October 20	vs. Texas	Fair Park Stadium; Dallas, TX (rivalry)	W 14–0		
November 3	at Missouri*	Rollins Field; Columbia, MO (rivalry)	W 14–7		
November 10	Kansas*	Boyd Field; Norman, OK	L 6–13		
November 17	vs. Arkansas	Municipal Stadium; Fort Smith, AR	T 0–0		
November 24	Kendall*	Boyd Field; Norman, OK	W 80–0		
November 29	vs. Oklahoma A&M	Fair Park; Oklahoma City, OK (rivalry)	L 0–9	5,000	
December 15	vs. Camp Doniphan*	Fair Park; Oklahoma City, OK	L 7–21		
*Non-conference game
