= 1917 Rice Owls football team =

American college football season

1917 Rice Owls football
- Conference: Southwest Conference
- Record: 7–1 (1–1 SWC)
- Head coach: Philip Arbuckle (6th season)
- Captain: J. W. McFarland
- Home stadium: Rice Field

1917 Southwest Conference football standings
	Conf.					Overall
Team	W		L		T	W		L		T
Texas A&M $	3	–	0	–	0	8	–	0	–	0
Baylor	2	–	1	–	0	6	–	2	–	1
Rice	1	–	1	–	0	7	–	1	–	0
Oklahoma	1	–	1	–	1	6	–	4	–	1
Texas	2	–	4	–	0	4	–	4	–	0
Oklahoma A&M	1	–	2	–	0	4	–	4	–	0
Arkansas	0	–	1	–	1	5	–	1	–	1
$ – Conference champion

The 1917 Rice Owls football team was an American football team that represented Rice Institute as a member of the Southwest Conference (SWC) during the 1917 college football season. In its sixth season under head coach Philip Arbuckle, the team compiled a 7–1 record (1–1 against SWC opponents), and outscored opponents by a total of 228 to 55.

== Schedule ==
Date	Time	Opponent	Site	Result	Source
October 6		Illinois Medical*	Rice Field; Houston, TX	W 31–6	
October 13	3:00 p.m.	TCU*	Rice Field; Houston, TX	W 26–0	
October 19		Austin*	Rice Field; Houston, TX	W 53–13	
October 27		at Texas	Clark Field; Austin, TX (rivalry)	W 13–0	
November 3		Haskell*	Rice Field; Houston, TX	W 55–13	
November 10		Southwestern (TX)*	Rice Field; Houston, TX	W 34–13	
November 17		at Tulane*	Tulane Stadium; New Orleans, LA	W 16–0	
November 29		Texas A&M	Rice Field; Houston, TX	L 0–10	
*Non-conference game; All times are in Central time
