= 1919 Texas Longhorns football team =

American college football season

1919 Texas Longhorns football
- Conference: Southwest Conference
- Record: 6–3 (3–2 SWC)
- Head coach: William Juneau (3rd season)
- Captain: Ghent Graves
- Home stadium: Clark Field

1919 Southwest Conference football standings
	Conf.					Overall
Team	W		L		T	W		L		T
Texas A&M $	4	–	0	–	0	10	–	0	–	0
Rice	3	–	1	–	0	8	–	1	–	0
Oklahoma	2	–	1	–	0	5	–	2	–	3
Texas	3	–	2	–	0	6	–	3	–	0
Arkansas	1	–	2	–	0	3	–	4	–	0
SMU	0	–	2	–	1	5	–	4	–	1
Oklahoma A&M	0	–	2	–	0	3	–	3	–	2
Baylor	0	–	3	–	1	5	–	3	–	1
$ – Conference champion

The 1919 Texas Longhorns football team was an American football team that represented the University of Texas (now known as the University of Texas at Austin) as a member of the Southwest Conference (SWC) during the 1919 college football season. In their third year under head coach William Juneau, the Longhorns compiled an overall record of 6–3 and a mark of 3–2 in conference play, and finished fourth in the SWC.

== Schedule ==
Date	Opponent	Site	Result	Source
September 27	Howard Payne*	Clark Field; Austin, TX	W 26–0	
October 4	Southwestern (TX)*	Clark Field; Austin, TX	W 39–0	
October 11	Phillips*	Clark Field; Austin, TX	L 0–10	
October 18	vs. Oklahoma	Fair Park Stadium; Dallas, TX (rivalry)	L 7–12	
October 25	Baylor	Clark Field; Austin, TX (rivalry)	W 29–13	
November 1	Rice	Clark Field; Austin, TX (rivalry)	W 32–6	
November 8	Arkansas	Clark Field; Austin, TX (rivalry)	W 35–7	
November 14	Haskell*	Clark Field; Austin, TX	W 13–7	
November 27	at Texas A&M	Kyle Field; College Station, TX (rivalry)	L 0–7	
*Non-conference game
