= 1918 Oklahoma Sooners football team =

American college football season

1918 Oklahoma Sooners football
- Conference: Southwest Conference
- Record: 6–0 (2–0 SWC)
- Head coach: Bennie Owen (14th season)
- Captain: Hugh McDermott
- Home stadium: Boyd Field

1918 Southwest Conference football standings
	Conf.					Overall
Team	W		L		T	W		L		T
Texas	4	–	0	–	0	9	–	0	–	0
Oklahoma	2	–	0	–	0	6	–	0	–	0
Texas A&M	1	–	1	–	0	6	–	1	–	0
Rice	1	–	1	–	0	1	–	5	–	1
SMU	1	–	2	–	0	4	–	2	–	0
Arkansas	0	–	1	–	0	3	–	2	–	0
Oklahoma A&M	0	–	2	–	0	4	–	2	–	0
Baylor	0	–	2	–	0	0	–	6	–	0
No champion recognized; Rankings from AP Poll

The 1918 Oklahoma Sooners football team represented the University of Oklahoma in the 1918 college football season. In their 14th year under head coach Bennie Owen, the Sooners compiled a 6–0 record (2–0 against conference opponents), and outscored their opponents by a combined total of 278 to 7.

No Sooners were recognized as All-Americans.

No Sooners received All-Southwest Conference honors.

== Schedule ==
Date	Opponent	Site	Result	Attendance	Source
October 19	Central State Normal*	Boyd Field; Norman, OK	W 44–0		
November 2	Post Field*	Boyd Field; Norman, OK	W 58–0		
November 9	at Kansas*	McCook Field; Lawrence, KS	W 33–0		
November 16	Arkansas	Boyd Field; Norman, OK	W 103–0		
November 23	at Phillips*	Alton Field; Enid, OK	W 13–7		
November 28	vs. Oklahoma A&M	Fair Park; Oklahoma City, OK (rivalry)	W 27–0	3,000	
*Non-conference game
