= 1918 Oklahoma A&M Aggies football team =

American college football season

1918 Oklahoma A&M Aggies football
- Conference: Southwest Conference
- Record: 4–2 (0–2 SWC)
- Head coach: Earl A. Pritchard (2nd season)
- Home stadium: Lewis Field

1918 Southwest Conference football standings
	Conf.					Overall
Team	W		L		T	W		L		T
Texas	4	–	0	–	0	9	–	0	–	0
Oklahoma	2	–	0	–	0	6	–	0	–	0
Texas A&M	1	–	1	–	0	6	–	1	–	0
Rice	1	–	1	–	0	1	–	5	–	1
SMU	1	–	2	–	0	4	–	2	–	0
Arkansas	0	–	1	–	0	3	–	2	–	0
Oklahoma A&M	0	–	2	–	0	4	–	2	–	0
Baylor	0	–	2	–	0	0	–	6	–	0
No champion recognized; Rankings from AP Poll

The 1918 Oklahoma A&M Aggies football team represented Oklahoma A&M College in the 1918 college football season. This was the 18th year of football at A&M and the second under Earl A. Pritchard. The Aggies played their home games at Lewis Field in Stillwater, Oklahoma. They finished the season 4–2, 0–2 in the Southwest Conference.

== Schedule ==
Date	Time	Opponent	Site	Result	Attendance	Source
October 5		Haskell*	Lewis Field; Stillwater, OK	W 19–6		
November 2		Central State Normal*	Lewis Field; Stillwater, OK	W 26–6		
November 9		at Texas	Clark Field; Austin, TX	L 5–27		
November 16		Fairmount*	Lewis Field; Stillwater, OK	W 26–7		
November 23	3:00 p.m.	at Kendall*	Lee school stadium; Tulsa, OK (rivalry)	W 34–0		
November 28		vs. Oklahoma	Fair Park; Oklahoma City, OK (rivalry)	L 0–27	3,000	
*Non-conference game; All times are in Central time
