= 1918 Texas A&M Aggies football team =

American college football season

1918 Texas A&M Aggies football
- Conference: Southwest Conference
- Record: 6–1 (1–1 SWC)
- Head coach: D. V. Graves (1st season)
- Home stadium: Kyle Field

1918 Southwest Conference football standings
	Conf.					Overall
Team	W		L		T	W		L		T
Texas	4	–	0	–	0	9	–	0	–	0
Oklahoma	2	–	0	–	0	6	–	0	–	0
Texas A&M	1	–	1	–	0	6	–	1	–	0
Rice	1	–	1	–	0	1	–	5	–	1
SMU	1	–	2	–	0	4	–	2	–	0
Arkansas	0	–	1	–	0	3	–	2	–	0
Oklahoma A&M	0	–	2	–	0	4	–	2	–	0
Baylor	0	–	2	–	0	0	–	6	–	0
No champion recognized; Rankings from AP Poll

The 1918 Texas A&M Aggies football team represented the Agricultural and Mechanical College of Texas (now known as Texas A&M University) as a member of the Southwest Conference (SWC) during the 1918 college football season. Led by first-year head coach D. V. Graves, the Aggies compiled an overall record of 6–1, with a mark of 1–1 in conference play. Texas A&M played home games at Kyle Field in College Station, Texas. Graves coached the Aggies for a year while Dana X. Bible served in the war.

== Schedule ==
Date	Opponent	Site	Result	Source
October 26	Ream Field (TX)*	Kyle Field; College Station, TX	W 6–0	
November 2	Camp Travis*	Kyle Field; College Station, TX	W 12–6	
November 9	at Baylor	Cotton Palace; Waco, TX (rivalry)	W 19–0	
November 16	Southwestern (TX)*	Kyle Field; College Station, TX	W 7–0	
November 23	Camp Mabry*	Kyle Field; College Station, TX	W 19–6	
November 28	at Texas	Clark Field; Austin, TX (rivalry)	L 0–7	
December 7	Camp Travis Remount*	Kyle Field; College Station, TX	W 60–0	
*Non-conference game
