= 1918 SMU Mustangs football team =

American college football season

1918 SMU Mustangs football
- Conference: Southwest Conference
- Record: 4–2 (1–2 SWC)
- Head coach: J. Burton Rix (2nd season)
- Captain: Horace Renshaw

1918 Southwest Conference football standings
	Conf.					Overall
Team	W		L		T	W		L		T
Texas	4	–	0	–	0	9	–	0	–	0
Oklahoma	2	–	0	–	0	6	–	0	–	0
Texas A&M	1	–	1	–	0	6	–	1	–	0
Rice	1	–	1	–	0	1	–	5	–	1
SMU	1	–	2	–	0	4	–	2	–	0
Arkansas	0	–	1	–	0	3	–	2	–	0
Oklahoma A&M	0	–	2	–	0	4	–	2	–	0
Baylor	0	–	2	–	0	0	–	6	–	0
No champion recognized; Rankings from AP Poll

The 1918 SMU Mustangs football team was an American football team that represented Southern Methodist University (SMU) as a member of the Southwest Conference (SWC) during the 1918 college football season. In its second season under head coach J. Burton Rix, the team compiled an overall record of 4–2 with a mark of 1–2 in conference play, placing fifth in the SWC. The Mustangs were outscored by a total of 45 to 39 on the season.

== Schedule ==
Date	Opponent	Site	Result	Source
October 19	Austin*	Armstrong Field; Dallas, TX	W 19–0	
October 26	TCU*	Armstrong Field; Dallas, TX (rivalry)	W 1–0 (forfeit)	
November 2	Love Field*	Armstrong Field; Dallas, TX	W 6–0	
November 16	Baylor	Armstrong Field; Dallas, TX	W 14–0	
November 23	at Texas	Clark Field; Austin, TX	L 0–32	
November 30	at Rice	Rice Field; Houston, TX (rivalry)	L 0–13	
*Non-conference game
