= 1919 SMU Mustangs football team =

American college football season

1919 SMU Mustangs football
- Conference: Southwest Conference
- Record: 5–4–1 (0–2–1 SWC)
- Head coach: J. Burton Rix (3rd season)
- Captain: Graham L. Pierce
- Home stadium: Armstrong Field, Gardner Park

1919 Southwest Conference football standings
| | Conf. | | | | | Overall |
| Team | W | | L | | T | W | | L | | T |
|---|---|---|---|---|---|---|---|---|---|---|
| Texas A&M $ | 4 | – | 0 | – | 0 | 10 | – | 0 | – | 0 |
| Rice | 3 | – | 1 | – | 0 | 8 | – | 1 | – | 0 |
| Oklahoma | 2 | – | 1 | – | 0 | 5 | – | 2 | – | 3 |
| Texas | 3 | – | 2 | – | 0 | 6 | – | 3 | – | 0 |
| Arkansas | 1 | – | 2 | – | 0 | 3 | – | 4 | – | 0 |
| SMU | 0 | – | 2 | – | 1 | 5 | – | 4 | – | 1 |
| Oklahoma A&M | 0 | – | 2 | – | 0 | 3 | – | 3 | – | 2 |
| Baylor | 0 | – | 3 | – | 1 | 5 | – | 3 | – | 1 |
$ – Conference champion

The 1919 SMU Mustangs football team was an American football team that represented Southern Methodist University (SMU) as a member of the Southwest Conference (SWC) during the 1919 college football season. In its third season under head coach J. Burton Rix, the team compiled an overall record of 5–4–1 record with a mark of 0–2–1 in conference play, placing sixth in the SWC. The Mustangs outscored their opponents by a total of 162 to 86 on the season.

== Schedule ==
| Date | Time | Opponent | Site | Result | Source |
|---|---|---|---|---|---|
| September 27 | 3:30 p.m. | Burleson* | Dallas, TX | W 26–6 | |
| October 4 | | Wesley* | Dallas, TX | W 7–6 | |
| October 11 | | Texas A&M | Gardner Park; Dallas, TX | L 0–16 | |
| October 18 | | at Daniel Baker* | Brownwood, TX | W 6–0 | |
| October 25 | 3:30 p.m. | Howard Payne* | Dallas, TX | L 9–14 | |
| November 1 | | Austin* | Armstrong Field; Dallas, TX | W 41–0 | |
| November 8 | 3:30 p.m. | at Rice | Rice Field; Houston, TX | L 14–21 | |
| November 15 | | Trinity (TX)* | Armstrong Field; Dallas, TX | W 46–6 | |
| November 22 | | at Baylor | Carroll Field; Waco, TX | T 7–7 | |
| November 27 | | at Southwestern (TX)* | Georgetown, TX | L 6–10 | |
*Non-conference game; All times are in Central time
