= 1919 Rice Owls football team =

American college football season

1919 Rice Owls football
- Conference: Southwest Conference
- Record: 8–1 (3–1 SWC)
- Head coach: Philip Arbuckle (7th season)
- Captain: Shirley Brick
- Home stadium: Rice Field

1919 Southwest Conference football standings
	Conf.					Overall
Team	W		L		T	W		L		T
Texas A&M $	4	–	0	–	0	10	–	0	–	0
Rice	3	–	1	–	0	8	–	1	–	0
Oklahoma	2	–	1	–	0	5	–	2	–	3
Texas	3	–	2	–	0	6	–	3	–	0
Arkansas	1	–	2	–	0	3	–	4	–	0
SMU	0	–	2	–	1	5	–	4	–	1
Oklahoma A&M	0	–	2	–	0	3	–	3	–	2
Baylor	0	–	3	–	1	5	–	3	–	1
$ – Conference champion

The 1919 Rice Owls football team was an American football team that represented Rice Institute as a member of the Southwest Conference (SWC) during the 1919 college football season. In its seventh season under head coach Philip Arbuckle, the team compiled an 8–1 record (3–1 against SWC opponents), and outscored opponents by a total of 190 to 60.

== Schedule ==
Date	Time	Opponent	Site	Result	Source
October 4		Trinity (TX)*	Rice Field; Houston, TX	W 12–0	
October 11	3:30 p.m.	at Baylor	Carroll Field; Waco, TX	W 8–0	
October 18		Southwestern (TX)*	Rice Field; Houston, TX	W 22–0	
October 24		Austin*	Rice Field; Houston, TX	W 54–0	
November 1		at Texas	Clark Field; Austin, TX (rivalry)	L 7–32	
November 8	3:30 p.m.	SMU	Rice Field; Houston, TX (rivalry)	W 21–14	
November 15		Sewanee*	Rice Field; Houston, TX	W 19–7	
November 21		Howard Payne*	Rice Field; Houston, TX	W 7–0	
November 27	3:00 p.m.	Arkansas	Rice Field; Houston, TX	W 40–7	
*Non-conference game; All times are in Central time
