= 1918 Rice Owls football team =

American college football season

1918 Rice Owls football
- Conference: Southwest Conference
- Record: 1–5–1 (1–1 SWC)
- Head coach: John E. Anderson (1st season)
- Captain: LeRoy Bell
- Home stadium: Rice Field

1918 Southwest Conference football standings
	Conf.					Overall
Team	W		L		T	W		L		T
Texas	4	–	0	–	0	9	–	0	–	0
Oklahoma	2	–	0	–	0	6	–	0	–	0
Texas A&M	1	–	1	–	0	6	–	1	–	0
Rice	1	–	1	–	0	1	–	5	–	1
SMU	1	–	2	–	0	4	–	2	–	0
Arkansas	0	–	1	–	0	3	–	2	–	0
Oklahoma A&M	0	–	2	–	0	4	–	2	–	0
Baylor	0	–	2	–	0	0	–	6	–	0
No champion recognized; Rankings from AP Poll

The 1918 Rice Owls football team was an American football team that represented Rice Institute as a member of the Southwest Conference (SWC) during the 1918 college football season. In its first season under head coach John E. Anderson, the team compiled a 1–5–1 record (1–1 against SWC opponents) and was outscored by a total of 62 to 13.

== Schedule ==
Date	Opponent	Site	Result	Source
October 5	Camp Logan*	Rice Field; Houston, TX	L 0–10	
October 19	Park Place Flyers*	Rice Field; Houston, TX	L 0–7	
October 26	Camp Logan*	Rice Field; Houston, TX	T 0–0	
November 2	Kelly Field*	Rice Field; Houston, TX	L 0–28	
November 9	Park Place Flyers*	Rice Field; Houston, TX	L 0–3	
November 16	Texas	Rice Field; Houston, TX (rivalry)	L 0–14	
November 30	SMU	Rice Field; Houston, TX (rivalry)	W 13–0	
*Non-conference game
