= TCU–Texas football rivalry =

American college football rivalry

- TCU Horned Frogs Texas Longhorns
- First meeting: November 3, 1897; Texas 18, TCU 10
- Latest meeting: November 11, 2023; Texas 29, TCU 26

Statistics
- Total meetings: 94
- All-time series: Texas leads, 65–28–1
- Largest victory: TCU: 46–0 (1956); Texas: 72–0 (1915)
- Longest win streak: Texas: 24 (1968–1991)
- Current win streak: Texas: 1 (2023–present)

Locations of TCU and Texas

The TCU–Texas football rivalry is a college football rivalry game between the Horned Frogs of Texas Christian University and the Longhorns of the University of Texas.

== History ==
The two Texas universities have a long history between each other. They first met on the football field on November 3, 1897, with Texas winning the contest 18–10. In 1898, the schools met twice, with Texas winning both games. The schools were members of the old Southwest Conference together from 1923 to 1995. Between the turn of the century and 1924, the Horned Frogs and Longhorns met nine times, with Texas emerging victorious each game. The largest margin of victory in the series occurred in 1915, with Texas obliterating TCU 72–0. The only tie in the series occurred in 1927, when TCU and Texas finished deadlocked at 0. Two years later in 1929, TCU recorded its first win over Texas, 15–12. Between 1932 and 1938, TCU defeated Texas six out of seven years.

After trading wins and losses during the 1940s through the 1960s, the Longhorns began their long run of dominance over the Frogs. Beginning in 1968, Texas defeated TCU in 24 consecutive matchups. The second largest margin of victory in the series occurred in 1974, with the Horns destroying the Frogs 81–16. On November 7, 1992, TCU ended the long, frustrating losing streak by defeating Texas 23–14. After a 27–19 Texas victory in 1995, the squads didn't meet again until 2007, when the Longhorns defeated the Horned Frogs 34–13.

When TCU joined the Big 12 Conference in 2012, their conference scheduling ensured that TCU and Texas will play every year on the football field. Since joining the Big 12, TCU has defeated Texas in eight of the twelve matchups, with the only UT victories in that stretch coming in 2013, 2018, 2021 and 2023.

Texas left the Big 12 Conference after the 2023 season to join the SEC beginning in 2024. No future games are currently scheduled between the two teams.

== Game results ==
TCU victories	Texas victories	Tie games

No.	Date	Location	Winning team		Losing team	
1	November 3, 1897	Waco	Texas	18	TCU	10
2	October 15, 1898	Waco	Texas	16	TCU	0
3	November 5, 1898	Austin	Texas	29	TCU	0
4	October 8, 1904	Austin	Texas	40	TCU	0
5	October 7, 1905	Austin	Texas	11	TCU	0
6	October 13, 1906	Austin	Texas	22	TCU	0
7	October 10, 1908	Austin	Texas	11	TCU	6
8	October 30, 1909	Austin	Texas	24	TCU	0
9	October 5, 1912	Austin	Texas	30	TCU	10
10	October 2, 1915	Austin	Texas	72	TCU	0
11	September 28, 1918	Austin	Texas	19	TCU	0
12	November 15, 1924	Fort Worth	Texas	13	TCU	0
13	October 1, 1927	Austin	Tie	0	Tie	0
14	November 17, 1928	Fort Worth	Texas	6	TCU	0
15	November 16, 1929	Austin	TCU	15	Texas	12
16	November 15, 1930	Fort Worth	Texas	7	TCU	0
17	November 14, 1931	Austin	Texas	10	TCU	0
18	November 11, 1932	Fort Worth	TCU	14	Texas	0
19	November 18, 1933	Austin	TCU	30	Texas	0
20	November 17, 1934	Fort Worth	Texas	20	TCU	19
21	November 16, 1935	Austin	TCU	28	Texas	0
22	November 7, 1936	Austin	TCU	27	Texas	6
23	November 13, 1937	Austin	TCU	14	Texas	0
24	November 12, 1938	Fort Worth	#1 TCU	28	Texas	6
25	November 18, 1939	Austin	Texas	25	TCU	19
26	November 16, 1940	Fort Worth	Texas	21	TCU	14
27	November 15, 1941	Austin	TCU	14	#2 Texas	7
28	November 14, 1942	Fort Worth	TCU	13	#8 Texas	7
29	November 13, 1943	Austin	#16 Texas	46	TCU	7
30	November 18, 1944	Fort Worth	TCU	7	Texas	6
31	November 17, 1945	Austin	#17 Texas	20	TCU	0
32	November 16, 1946	Fort Worth	TCU	14	#6 Texas	0
33	November 15, 1947	Austin	#7 Texas	20	TCU	0
34	November 13, 1948	Fort Worth	Texas	14	TCU	7
35	November 12, 1949	Austin	TCU	14	#13 Texas	13
36	November 18, 1950	Fort Worth	#6 Texas	21	TCU	7
37	November 17, 1951	Austin	#15 Texas	32	#13 TCU	21
38	November 15, 1952	Fort Worth	#9 Texas	14	TCU	7
39	November 14, 1953	Austin	#10 Texas	13	TCU	3
40	November 13, 1954	Fort Worth	Texas	35	TCU	34
41	November 12, 1955	Austin	#8 TCU	47	Texas	20
42	November 17, 1956	Fort Worth	TCU	46	Texas	0
43	November 16, 1957	Austin	Texas	14	#17 TCU	2
44	November 15, 1958	Fort Worth	#9 TCU	22	Texas	8
45	November 14, 1959	Austin	#18 TCU	14	#2 Texas	9
46	November 12, 1960	Fort Worth	Texas	3	TCU	2
47	November 18, 1961	Austin	TCU	6	#1 Texas	0
48	November 17, 1962	Fort Worth	#5 Texas	14	TCU	0

No.	Date	Location	Winning team		Losing team	
49	November 16, 1963	Austin	#1 Texas	17	TCU	0
50	November 14, 1964	Fort Worth	#5 Texas	28	TCU	13
51	November 13, 1965	Austin	TCU	25	Texas	10
52	November 12, 1966	Fort Worth	Texas	13	TCU	3
53	November 18, 1967	Austin	TCU	24	Texas	17
54	November 16, 1968	Fort Worth	#8 Texas	47	TCU	21
55	November 15, 1969	Austin	#2 Texas	69	TCU	7
56	November 14, 1970	Fort Worth	#2 Texas	58	TCU	0
57	November 13, 1971	Austin	#13 Texas	31	TCU	0
58	November 18, 1972	Fort Worth	#7 Texas	27	TCU	0
59	November 17, 1973	Austin	#11 Texas	52	TCU	7
60	November 16, 1974	Fort Worth	Texas	81	TCU	16
61	November 15, 1975	Austin	#7 Texas	27	TCU	11
62	November 13, 1976	Fort Worth	Texas	34	TCU	7
63	November 12, 1977	Austin	#1 Texas	44	TCU	14
64	November 18, 1978	Fort Worth	#9 Texas	41	TCU	0
65	November 17, 1979	Austin	#6 Texas	35	TCU	10
66	November 15, 1980	Fort Worth	Texas	51	TCU	26
67	November 14, 1981	Austin	#10 Texas	31	TCU	15
68	November 13, 1982	Fort Worth	#20 Texas	38	TCU	21
69	November 12, 1983	Austin	#2 Texas	20	TCU	14
70	November 17, 1984	Fort Worth	#10 Texas	44	#12 TCU	23
71	November 16, 1985	Austin	Texas	20	TCU	0
72	November 15, 1986	Fort Worth	Texas	45	TCU	16
73	November 14, 1987	Austin	Texas	24	TCU	21
74	November 12, 1988	Fort Worth	Texas	30	TCU	21
75	November 18, 1989	Austin	Texas	31	TCU	17
76	November 17, 1990	Fort Worth	#7 Texas	38	TCU	10
77	November 16, 1991	Austin	Texas	32	TCU	0
78	November 7, 1992	Fort Worth	TCU	23	#20 Texas	14
79	November 13, 1993	Austin	Texas	24	TCU	3
80	September 24, 1994	Fort Worth	#15 Texas	34	TCU	18
81	November 18, 1995	Austin	#10 Texas	27	TCU	19
82	September 8, 2007	Austin	#7 Texas	34	#19 TCU	13
83	November 22, 2012	Austin	TCU	20	#18 Texas	13
84	October 26, 2013	Fort Worth	Texas	30	TCU	7
85	November 27, 2014	Austin	#6 TCU	48	Texas	10
86	October 3, 2015	Fort Worth	#4 TCU	50	Texas	7
87	November 25, 2016	Austin	TCU	31	Texas	9
88	November 4, 2017	Fort Worth	#10 TCU	24	Texas	7
89	September 22, 2018	Austin	Texas	31	#17 TCU	16
90	October 26, 2019	Fort Worth	TCU	37	#15 Texas	27
91	October 3, 2020	Austin	TCU	33	#9 Texas	31
92	October 2, 2021	Fort Worth	Texas	32	TCU	27
93	November 12, 2022	Austin	#4 TCU	17	#18 Texas	10
94	November 11, 2023	Fort Worth	#7 Texas	29	TCU	26
Series: Texas leads 65–28–1

=== Results by location ===
As of November 11, 2023

City	Games	Texas victories	TCU victories	Ties
Austin	52	34	17	1
Fort Worth	40	29	11	0
Waco	2	2	0	0

== See also ==
- List of NCAA college football rivalry games
- Most consecutive NCAA football wins over one opponent
