= 1916 Southwest Conference football season =

- Sport: Football
- Duration: September 23 – December 1, 1916
- Teams: 8
- Champion: none recognized

SWC seasons
- ← 1915 1917 →

1916 Southwest Conference football standings
	Conf.					Overall
Team	W		L		T	W		L		T
Texas	5	–	1	–	0	7	–	2	–	0
Baylor	3	–	1	–	0	9	–	1	–	0
Rice	2	–	1	–	0	6	–	1	–	2
Oklahoma	2	–	1	–	0	6	–	5	–	0
Texas A&M	1	–	2	–	0	6	–	3	–	0
Arkansas	0	–	2	–	0	4	–	4	–	0
Oklahoma A&M	0	–	3	–	0	4	–	4	–	0
Southwestern (TX)	0	–	4	–	0	3	–	5	–	1
No champion recognized

The 1916 Southwest Conference football season was the second season of college football played by the member schools of the Southwest Conference (SWC) and was a part of the 1916 college football season. Despite finishing in 1st place, the University of Texas Longhorns were not recognized as conference champions for an unknown reason. This was also Southwestern's final year in the conference as they returned to the TIAA after the 1916 season.

== Results and team statistics ==
Conf. rank	Team	Head coach	Overall record	Conf. record	PPG	PAG
1	Texas	Eugene Van Gent	7–2–0 (.778)	5–1–0 (.833)	24.2	3.9
2	Baylor	Charles Mosley	9–1–0 (.900)	3–1–0 (.750)	31.6	2.7
3	Rice	Philip Arbuckle	6–1–2 (.778)	2–1–0 (.667)	38.4	6.9
4	Oklahoma	Bennie Owen	6–5–0 (.545)	2–1–0 (.667)	42.9	10.5
5	Texas A&M	Edwin Harlan	6–3–0 (.667)	1–2–0 (.333)	20.9	7.3
6	Arkansas	T. T. McConnell	4–4–0 (.500)	0–2–0 (.000)	32.6	15.4
7	Oklahoma A&M	John G. Griffith	4–4–0 (.500)	0–3–0 (.000)	36.3	11.9
8	Southwestern	J. Burton Rix	3–5–1 (.389)	0–4–0 (.000)	8.6	19.9

Key
PPG = Average of points scored per game
PAG = Average of points allowed per game

== Schedules ==
Index to colors and formatting
Non-conference matchup; SWC member won
Non-conference matchup; SWC member lost
Non-conference matchup; tie
SWC teams in **bold**

=== Week One ===
Date	Visiting team	Home team	Site	Result	Attendance	Ref.
September 23	**Oklahoma**	Central State Normal	Fair Park • Oklahoma City, OK	**W** 27–0		

Week	No Game						
1	Texas	Baylor	Rice	Texas A&M	Arkansas	Oklahoma A&M	Southwestern

=== Week Two ===
Date	Visiting team	Home team	Site	Result	Attendance	Ref.
September 29	Howard Payne	**Southwestern**	Snyder Field • Georgetown, TX	**W** 9–0		
September 30	SMU	**Texas**	Clark Field • Austin, TX	**W** 74–0	2,400	
September 30	San Marcos Baptist Academy	**Baylor**	Carroll Field • Waco, TX	**W** 76–0		
September 30	Oklahoma Catholic	**Oklahoma**	Boyd Field • Norman, OK	**W** 107–0		
September 30	Pittsburg Normal	**Arkansas**	The Hill • Fayetteville, AR	**W** 34–20		

Week	No Game		
2	Texas A&M	Southwestern	Oklahoma A&M

=== Week Three ===
Date	Visiting team	Home team	Site	Result	Attendance	Ref.
October 6	**Southwestern**	Texas A&M	Kyle Field • College Station, TX	**TAMU** 6–0		
October 7	**Rice**	Texas	Clark Field • Austin, TX (rivalry)	**UT** 16–2		
October 7	SMU	Baylor	Carroll Field • Waco, TX	**W** 61–0		
October 7	Southwestern Normal	Oklahoma	Boyd Field • Norman, OK	**W** 140–0		
October 7	Hendrix	Arkansas	The Hill • Fayetteville, AR	**W** 58–0		
October 7	Northwestern Territorial Normal	Oklahoma A&M	Lewis Field • Stillwater, OK	**W** 90–0		

=== Week Four ===
Date	Visiting team	Home team	Site	Result	Attendance	Ref.
October 13	**Oklahoma A&M**	**Texas**	League Park • San Antonio, TX	**UT** 14–6	5,000	
October 13	Austin	**Rice**	Rice Field • Houston, TX	**W** 40–0		
October 13	Daniel Baker	**Southwestern**	Snyder Field • Georgetown, TX	**L** 0–7		
October 14	**Baylor**	Trinity (TX)	Fair Park • Dallas, TX	**W** 37–0		
October 14	Kendall	**Oklahoma**	Boyd Field • Norman, OK	**L** 0–16		
October 14	LSU	**Texas A&M**	Galveston, TX (rivalry)	**L** 0–13		
October 14	Oklahoma Mines	**Arkansas**	The Hill • Fayetteville, AR	**W** 82–0		

=== Week Five ===
Date	Visiting team	Home team	Site	Result	Attendance	Ref.
October 19	**Baylor**	Howard Payne	Brownwood, TX	**W** 47–0		
October 21	**Texas**	**Oklahoma**	Fair Park Stadium • Dallas, TX	**UT** 21–7		
October 21	**Southwestern**	**Rice**	Rice Field • Houston, TX	**RICE** 54–0		
October 21	Missouri Mines	**Arkansas**	The Hill • Fayetteville, AR	**W** 60–0		
October 21	Southwestern Normal	**Oklahoma A&M**	Lewis Field • Stillwater, OK	**W** 117–0		
October 23	SMU	**Texas A&M**	Kyle Field • College Station, TX	**W** 62–0		

=== Week Six ===
Date	Visiting team	Home team	Site	Result	Attendance	Ref.
October 27	**Rice**	TCU	TCU gridiron • Fort Worth, TX	**T** 7–7		
October 27	Austin	**Southwestern**	Snyder Field • Georgetown, TX	**W** 20–7		
October 28	**Baylor**	**Texas**	Clark Field • Austin, TX	**BAY** 7–3		
October 28	Missouri	**Oklahoma**	Boyd Field • Norman, OK (rivalry)	**L** 14–23		
October 28	Haskell	**Texas A&M**	Fair Park • Dallas, TX	**W** 13–6		
October 28	Warrensburg	**Oklahoma A&M**	Lewis Field • Stillwater, OK	**W** 16–7		

Week	No Game
6	Arkansas

=== Week Seven ===
Date	Visiting team	Home team	Site	Result	Attendance	Ref.
November 4	Texas	Missouri	Rollins Field • Columbia, MO	**L** 0–3		
November 4	Southwestern	**Baylor**	Cotton Palace • Waco, TX	**BAY** 20–0		
November 4	Texas A&M	**Rice**	West End Park • Houston, TX	**RICE** 20–0		
November 4	Oklahoma	Kansas	McCook Field • Lawrence, KS	**L** 13–21		
November 4	Arkansas	LSU	Fair Grounds • Shreveport, LA	**L** 7–17		
November 4	Oklahoma A&M	Kendall	Association Park • Tulsa, OK (rivalry)	**L** 13–17	3,000	

=== Week Eight ===
Date	Visiting team	Home team	Site	Result	Attendance	Ref.
November 10	TCU	**Southwestern**	Snyder Field • Georgetown, TX	**W** 41–13		
November 11	**Texas A&M**	**Baylor**	Cotton Palace • Waco, TX (rivalry)	**TAMU** 3–0	2,000	
November 11	Tulane	**Rice**	Rice Field • Houston, TX	**W** 23–13		
November 11	Kingfisher	**Oklahoma**	Boyd Field • Norman, OK	**W** 96–0		
November 11	Central State Normal	**Oklahoma A&M**	Lewis Field • Stillwater, OK	**L** 34–6		

Week	No Game	
8	Texas	Arkansas

=== Week Nine ===
Date	Visiting team	Home team	Site	Result	Attendance	Ref.
November 14	**Arkansas**	**Texas**	Clark Field • Austin, TX (rivalry)	**UT** 52–0		
November 17	SMU	**Rice**	Rice Field • Houston, TX (rivalry)	**W** 146–3		
November 17	Missouri Mines	**Texas A&M**	Kyle Field • College Station, TX	**W** 77–0		
November 18	**Baylor**	**Oklahoma A&M**	Lewis Field • Stillwater, OK	**W** **BAY** 10-7		
November 18	Kansas State	**Oklahoma**	Boyd Field • Norman, OK	**L** 13–14		

Week	No Game
9	Southwestern

=== Week Ten ===
Date	Visiting team	Home team	Site	Result	Attendance	Ref.
November 21	**Southwestern**	**Texas**	Clark Field • Austin, TX	**UT** 17–3		
November 24	Austin	**Baylor**	Carroll Field • Waco, TX	**W** 26–0		
November 24	**Rice**	LSU	State Field • Baton Rouge, LA	**T** 7–7		
November 25	**Oklahoma**	**Arkansas**	Municipal Stadium • Fort Smith, AR	**OU** 14-13		

Week	No Game	
9	Oklahoma A&M	Texas A&M

=== Week Eleven ===
Date	Visiting team	Home team	Site	Result	Attendance	Ref.
November 30	**Texas A&M**	**Texas**	Clark Field • Austin, TX (rivalry)	**UT** 21–7	15,000	
November 30	**Baylor**	TCU	TCU Gridiron • Fort Worth, TX (rivalry)	**W** 32–14	4,500	
November 30	Arizona	**Rice**	Rice Field • Houston, TX	**W** 47–16		
November 30	**Oklahoma A&M**	**Oklahoma**	Fair Park • Oklahoma City, OK (rivalry)	**OU** 41-7	7,500	
November 30	**Arkansas**	Mississippi A&M	Russwood Park • Memphis, TN	**L** 7-20		
December 1	SMU	**Southwestern**	Snyder Field • Georgetown, TX	**T** 9-9		
