= 1917–18 Baylor Bears basketball team =

American college basketball season

1917–18 Baylor Bears men's basketball
- Conference: Southwest Conference
- Record: 2-15 (2-7 SWC)
- Head coach: Charles Mosley

1917–18 Southwest Conference men's basketball standings
| | Conf. | | | | Overall |
| Team | W | | L | PCT | W | | L | PCT |
|---|---|---|---|---|---|---|---|---|
| Rice | 7 | – | 3 | .700 | 10 | – | 4 | .714 |
| Texas | 8 | – | 4 | .667 | 14 | – | 5 | .737 |
| Texas A&M | 7 | – | 7 | .500 | 9 | – | 9 | .500 |
| Baylor | 2 | – | 7 | .222 | 2 | – | 15 | .118 |
| Oklahoma A&M | 1 | – | 4 | .200 | 6 | – | 10 | .375 |

The 1917-18 Baylor Bears basketball team represented the Baylor University during the 1917-18 college men's basketball season.

== Schedule ==
| Date time, TV | Opponent | Result | Record | Site city, state |
|---|---|---|---|---|
| * | Decatur College | L 21-39 | 0-1 | Waco, TX |
| * | Texas | W 36-32 | 1-1 | Waco, TX |
| * | SMU | L 9-16 | 1-2 | Waco, TX |
| | at Texas | L 15-31 | 1-3 | Austin, TX |
| | Texas A&M | W 23-14 | 2-3 | Waco, TX |
| | Texas A&M | L 9-19 | 2-4 | Waco, TX |
| * | Hardin–Simmons | L 15-32 | 2-5 | Waco, TX |
| * | Hardin-Simmons | L 17-29 | 2-6 | Waco, TX |
| | Oklahoma A&M | L 20-24 | 2-7 | Waco, TX |
| | Texas A&M | L 25-31 | 2-8 | Waco, TX |
| | Texas A&M | L 15-23 | 2-9 | Waco, TX |
| | Rice | L 21-52 | 2-10 | Waco, TX |
| | Rice | L 20-53 | 2-11 | Waco, TX |
| * | TCU | L 30-36 | 2-12 | Waco, TX |
| * | Hardin-Simmons | L 10-17 | 2-13 | Waco, TX |
| * | Hardin-Simmons | L 16-27 | 2-14 | Waco, TX |
| * | at SMU | L 5-20 | 2-15 | Dallas, TX |
*Non-conference game. (#) Tournament seedings in parentheses.
