= 1914–15 Baylor Bears basketball team =

American college basketball season

1914–15 Baylor Bears men's basketball
- Conference: Southwest Conference
- Record: 1-10 (0-7 SWC)
- Head coach: Charles Mosley

1914–15 Southwest Conference men's basketball standings
	Conf.				Overall
Team	W		L	PCT	W		L	PCT
Texas	5	–	0	1.000	14	–	0	1.000
Rice	5	–	1	.833	8	–	1	.889
Texas A&M	4	–	1	.800	13	–	2	.867
Southwestern (Tex.)	1	–	5	.167	1	–	5	.167
Baylor	0	–	8	.000	1	–	9	.100

The 1914-15 Baylor Bears basketball team represented the Baylor University during the 1914-15 college men's basketball season.

== Schedule ==
Date time, TV	Opponent	Result	Record	Site city, state
	Waco HS	W 46-19	1-0	Waco, TX
	Decatur College	L 25-34	1-1	Waco, TX
	Rice	L 10-45	1-2	Waco, TX
	Texas A&M	L 14-39	1-3	Waco, TX
	at Texas	L 16-52	1-4	Austin, TX
	at TCU	L 14-28	1-5	Fort Worth, TX
	Rice	L 20-40	1-6	Waco, TX
	Texas A&M	L 23-35	1-7	Waco, TX
	Texas	L 29-57	1-8	Waco, TX
	Texas	L 19-57	1-9	Waco, TX
	Waco YMCA	L 29-44	1-10	Waco, TX
*Non-conference game. (#) Tournament seedings in parentheses.
