= 1918–19 Baylor Bears basketball team =

American college basketball season

1918–19 Baylor Bears men's basketball
- Conference: Southwest Conference
- Record: 2-11 (2-8 SWC)
- Head coach: Charles Mosley

1918–19 Southwest Conference men's basketball standings
	Conf.				Overall
Team	W		L	PCT	W		L	PCT
Texas	11	–	2	.846	17	–	3	.850
Texas A&M	7	–	3	.700	14	–	4	.778
SMU	5	–	6	.455	7	–	8	.467
Rice	2	–	8	.200	4	–	10	.286
Baylor	2	–	8	.200	2	–	9	.182

The 1918-19 Baylor Bears basketball team represented the Baylor University during the 1918-19 college men's basketball season.

== Schedule ==
Date time, TV	Opponent	Result	Record	Site city, state
*	North Texas State	L 20-21	0-1	Waco, TX
	Texas	L 13-21	0-2	Waco, TX
*	Decatur College	L 25-40	0-3	Waco, TX
	SMU	W 30-28	1-3	Waco, TX
	at Rice	L 20-28	1-4	Houston, TX
	at Rice	L 24-32	1-5	Houston, TX
	at Texas A&M	L 26-36	1-6	College Station, TX
	at Texas A&M	L 22-32	1-7	College Station, TX
	Texas A&M	L 22-30	1-8	Waco, TX
	Texas A&M	W 26-24	2-8	Waco, TX
	at Texas	L 7-40	2-9	Austin, TX
*	at Baylor Medical School	L 20-28	2-10	Houston, TX
	at SMU	L 28-30	2-11	Dallas, TX
*Non-conference game. (#) Tournament seedings in parentheses.
