= 1915–16 Baylor Bears basketball team =

American college basketball season

1915–16 Baylor Bears men's basketball
- Conference: Southwest Conference
- Record: 8-9 (0-8 SWC)
- Head coach: Charles Mosley

1915–16 Southwest Conference men's basketball standings
	Conf.				Overall
Team	W		L	PCT	W		L	PCT
Texas	6	–	0	1.000	12	–	0	1.000
Texas A&M	6	–	2	.750	11	–	2	.846
Rice	5	–	3	.625	12	–	5	.706
Southwestern (Tex.)	0	–	4	.000	0	–	4	.000
Baylor	0	–	8	.000	8	–	9	.471

The 1915-16 Baylor Bears basketball team represented the Baylor University during the 1915-16 college men's basketball season.

== Schedule ==
Date time, TV	Opponent	Result	Record	Site city, state
	Waco YMCA	W 25-21	1-0	Waco, TX
	Texas	L 22-44	1-1	Waco, TX
	at Texas	L 19-22	1-2	Austin, TX
	at Rice	L 19-35	1-3	Houston, TX
	at Rice	L 15-34	1-4	Houston, TX
	at Texas A&M	L 9-39	1-5	College Station, TX
	at Texas A&M	L 6-34	1-6	College Station, TX
	Hardin–Simmons	W 35-19	2-6	Waco, TX
	Hardin-Simmons	W 48-35	3-6	Waco, TX
	TCU	W 44-27	4-6	Waco, TX
	Tulane	L 24-35	4-7	Waco, TX
	Tulane	W 20-19	5-7	Waco, TX
	Texas A&M	L 14-28	5-8	Waco, TX
	Texas A&M	L 22-24	5-9	Waco, TX
	at Hardin-Simmons	W 27-15	6-9	Abilene, TX
	at Hardin-Simmons	W 18-16	7-9	Abilene, TX
	Waco YMCA	W 50-28	8-9	Waco, TX
*Non-conference game. (#) Tournament seedings in parentheses.
