= 1916 Baylor Bears football team =

American college football season

1916 Baylor Bears football
- Conference: Southwest Conference
- Record: 9–1 (3–1 SWC)
- Head coach: Charles Mosley (3rd season)
- Captain: Theron J. Fouts
- Home stadium: Carroll Field, Cotton Palace

1916 Southwest Conference football standings
	Conf.					Overall
Team	W		L		T	W		L		T
Texas	5	–	1	–	0	7	–	2	–	0
Baylor	3	–	1	–	0	9	–	1	–	0
Rice	2	–	1	–	0	6	–	1	–	2
Oklahoma	2	–	1	–	0	6	–	5	–	0
Texas A&M	1	–	2	–	0	6	–	3	–	0
Arkansas	0	–	2	–	0	4	–	4	–	0
Oklahoma A&M	0	–	3	–	0	4	–	4	–	0
Southwestern (TX)	0	–	4	–	0	3	–	5	–	1
No champion recognized

The 1916 Baylor Bears football team was an American football team that represented Baylor University 1st season as a member of the Southwest Conference (SWC) during the 1916 college football season. In its third season under head coach Charles Mosley, the team compiled a Baylor claims a 9–1 record (3–1 against SWC opponents) and outscored opponents by a total of 316 to 27. Baylor claims a conference championship for the 1916 season.

== Schedule ==
Date	Opponent	Site	Result	Attendance	Source
September 30	San Marcos Baptist Academy*	Carroll Field; Waco, TX	W 76–0		
October 7	SMU*	Carroll Field; Waco, TX	W 61–0		
October 14	vs. Trinity (TX)*	Fair Park; Dallas, TX	W 37–0		
October 19	at Howard Payne*	Brownwood, TX	W 47–0		
October 28	at Texas	Clark Field; Austin, TX (rivalry)	W 7–3		
November 4	Southwestern (TX)	Cotton Palace; Waco, TX	W 20–0		
November 11	Texas A&M	Cotton Palace; Waco, TX (rivalry)	L 0–3	2,000	
November 18	at Oklahoma A&M	Lewis Field; Stillwater, OK	W 10–7		
November 24	Austin*	Carroll Field; Waco, TX	W 26–0		
November 30	at TCU*	TCU gridiron; Fort Worth, TX (rivalry)	W 32–14	4,500	
*Non-conference game
