= 1916–17 Baylor Bears basketball team =

American college basketball season

1916–17 Baylor Bears men's basketball
- Conference: Southwest Conference
- Record: 7-10 (0-6 SWC)
- Head coach: Charles Mosley

1916–17 Southwest Conference men's basketball standings
	Conf.				Overall
Team	W		L	PCT	W		L	PCT
Texas	7	–	1	.875	13	–	3	.813
Texas A&M	3	–	3	.500	11	–	8	.579
Baylor	0	–	6	.000	7	–	10	.412

The 1916-17 Baylor Bears basketball team represented the Baylor University during the 1916-17 college men's basketball season.

== Schedule ==
Date time, TV	Opponent	Result	Record	Site city, state
	Southwest Texas State	W 38-11	1-0	Waco, TX
	Hardin–Simmons	W 24-16	2-0	Waco, TX
	Hardin Simmons	W 22-19	3-0	Waco, TX
	Decatur College	L 21-39	3-1	Waco, TX
	Durrant (Okla.)	W 38-13	4-1	Waco, TX
	Durrant (Okla.)	W 24-18	5-1	Waco, TX
	Texas A&M	L 8-31	5-2	Waco, TX
	Texas A&M	L 13-20	5-3	Waco, TX
	at Texas	L 19-27	5-4	Austin, TX
	at Texas	L 11-19	5-5	Austin, TX
	at Southwestern	W 26-8	6-5	Waco, TX
	Oklahoma	L 28-42	6-6	Waco, TX
	Southwestern	W 46-8	7-6	Waco, TX
	Texas	L 15-32	7-7	Waco, TX
	Texas	L 25-31	7-8	Waco, TX
	at Hardin-Simmons	L 20-22	7-9	Abilene, TX
	at Hardin-Simmons	L 15-21	7-10	Abilene, TX
*Non-conference game. (#) Tournament seedings in parentheses.
