= 1916 Washington University Pikers football team =

American college football season

1916 Washington University Pikers football
- Conference: Missouri Valley Conference
- Record: 3–3–1 (0–2 MVC)
- Head coach: William P. Edmunds (4th season)
- Home stadium: Francis Field

1916 Missouri Valley Conference football standings
	Conf.					Overall
Team	W		L		T	W		L		T
Nebraska $	3	–	1	–	0	6	–	2	–	0
Missouri	3	–	1	–	1	6	–	1	–	1
Iowa State	2	–	1	–	1	5	–	2	–	1
Kansas State	1	–	1	–	1	6	–	1	–	1
Kansas	1	–	2	–	1	4	–	3	–	1
Drake	1	–	3	–	0	3	–	5	–	0
Washington University	0	–	2	–	0	3	–	3	–	1
$ – Conference champion

The 1916 Washington University Pikers football team represented Washington University in St. Louis as a member of the Missouri Valley Conference (MVC) during the 1916 college football season. Led by William P. Edmunds in his fourth and final season as head coach, the Pikers compiled an overall record of 3–3–1 with a mark of 0–2 in conference play, placing last out of seven teams in the MVC. Washington University played home games at Francis Field in St. Louis.

== Schedule ==
Date	Time	Opponent	Site	Result	Attendance	Source
October 7	3:00 p.m.	Rose Polytechnic*	Francis Field; St. Louis, MO	W 14–0	1,200	
October 14	3:00 p.m.	at Missouri	Rollins Field; Columbia, MO	L 0–13		
October 21	3:00 p.m.	Drake	Francis Field; St. Louis, MO	L 0–13		
October 28	3:00 p.m.	Missouri Mines*	Francis Field; St. Louis, MO	W 7–6		
November 4	2:30 p.m.	at Michigan*	Ferry Field; Ann Arbor, MI	L 7–66		
November 11	2:30 p.m.	Knox*	Francis Field; St. Louis, MO	T 7–7		
November 30		Saint Louis*	Francis Field; St. Louis, MO	W 0–13	9,000	
*Non-conference game
