= Nebraska Cornhuskers football =

University of Nebraska–Lincoln football team

| 2026 Nebraska Cornhuskers football team |
- First season: 1890; 136 years ago
- Athletic director: Troy Dannen
- Head coach: Matt Rhule; 4th season, 26–23 (.531)
- Location: Lincoln, Nebraska
- Stadium: Memorial Stadium (capacity: 85,458)
- NCAA division: Division I FBS
- Conference: Big Ten
- Colors: Scarlet and cream
- All-time record: 938–440–40 (.676)
- Bowl record: 27–28 (.491)

National championships
- Claimed: 1970, 1971, 1994, 1995, 1997
- Unclaimed: 1915, 1980, 1981, 1982, 1983, 1984, 1993

National finalist
- Poll era: 1965, 1971, 1983
- Bowl Coalition: 1993, 1994
- Bowl Alliance: 1995, 1997
- BCS: 2001

Conference championships
- WIUFA: 1894, 1895, 1897 MVIAA: 1907, 1910, 1911, 1912, 1913, 1914, 1915, 1916, 1917, 1921, 1922, 1923 Big Eight: 1928, 1929, 1931, 1932, 1933, 1935, 1936, 1937, 1940, 1963, 1964, 1965, 1966, 1969, 1970, 1971, 1972, 1975, 1978, 1981, 1982, 1983, 1984, 1988, 1991, 1992, 1993, 1994, 1995 Big 12: 1997, 1999

Division championships
- Big 12 North: 1996, 1997, 1999, 2000, 2001, 2006, 2008, 2009, 2010 Big Ten Legends: 2012
- Heisman winners: Johnny Rodgers – 1972; Mike Rozier – 1983; Eric Crouch – 2001
- Consensus All-Americans: 65
- Rivalries: Iowa (rivalry); Minnesota (rivalry); Wisconsin (rivalry); Oklahoma (rivalry); Colorado (rivalry); Missouri (rivalry); Iowa State (rivalry); Kansas (rivalry); Kansas State (rivalry); Miami (FL) (rivalry)

Uniforms
- Fight song: Hail Varsity
- Mascot: Herbie Husker; Lil' Red
- Marching band: Cornhusker Marching Band
- Outfitter: Adidas
- Website: huskers.com

The Nebraska Cornhuskers football team competes as part of the NCAA Division I Football Bowl Subdivision, representing the University of Nebraska–Lincoln in the Big Ten Conference. Nebraska has played its home games at Memorial Stadium since 1923 and sold out every game at the venue since 1962.

Nebraska is among the most storied programs in college football history and has the eighth-most all-time victories among FBS teams. NU has won forty-six conference championships and five national championships (1970, 1971, 1994, 1995, 1997), along with seven unclaimed national titles. Its 1971 and 1995 teams are considered among the best ever. Heisman Trophy winners Johnny Rodgers, Mike Rozier, and Eric Crouch join twenty-four other Cornhuskers in the College Football Hall of Fame.

The program's first extended period of success came early in the twentieth century. Between 1900 and 1916, Nebraska had five undefeated seasons and a stretch of thirty-four games without a loss. The Cornhuskers won twenty-four conference championships prior to World War II but struggled through the postwar years until Bob Devaney was hired in 1962. Devaney built Nebraska into a national power, winning two national championships and eight conference titles in eleven seasons as head coach. Offensive coordinator Tom Osborne was named Devaney's successor in 1973 and over the next twenty-five years established himself as one of the best coaches in college football history with his trademark I formation offense and revolutionary strength, conditioning, and nutrition programs. Following Osborne's retirement in 1997, Nebraska cycled through five head coaches before hiring Matt Rhule in 2023.

== Conference affiliations ==
- Independent (1890–1891, 1898–1906, 1919–1920)
- Western Interstate University Football Association (1892–1897)
- Missouri Valley Intercollegiate Athletic Association / Big Eight Conference (1907–1918, 1921–1995) (Note: In 1928, the ten member schools of the Missouri Valley Intercollegiate Athletic Association agreed to a splintering of the conference – Iowa State, Kansas, Kansas State, Missouri, Nebraska, and Oklahoma retained the MVIAA name and Drake, Grinnell, Oklahoma A&M (now Oklahoma State), and Washington University formed the Missouri Valley Conference. The MVIAA became commonly known as the Big Six, and later the Big Seven and Big Eight. Its name was officially changed to the Big Eight in 1964.)
- Big 12 Conference (1996–2010)
  - North Division
- Big Ten Conference (2011–present)
  - Legends Division (2011–2012)
  - West Division (2013–2023)

== Head coaches ==
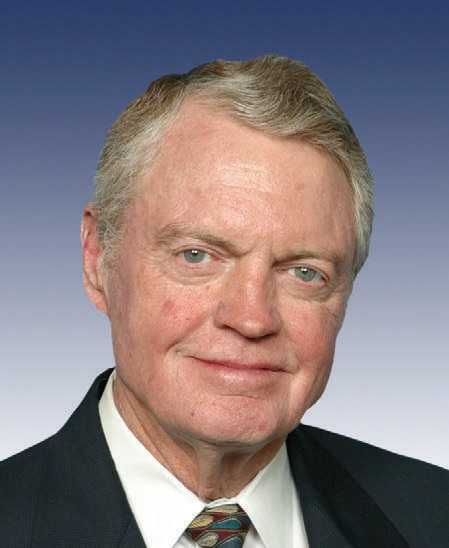
Tom Osborne coached Nebraska from 1973 to 1997, winning 255 games and three major-poll national championships

Nebraska has had thirty-one head coaches in its history, with five others coaching at least one game on a non-permanent basis. Eight have been inducted into the College Football Hall of Fame: Edward N. Robinson, Fielding H. Yost, Dana X. Bible, Biff Jones, Pete Elliott, (Note: Pete Elliott was inducted into the College Football Hall of Fame for his playing career as a quarterback at Michigan.) Bob Devaney, Tom Osborne, and Frank Solich. Osborne is the program's leader in most categories and holds the fifth-highest career win percentage in major college football history.

NU's earliest coaching history is unclear, as several men were appointed to assist or oversee the young program in an unofficial capacity. The school recognizes Frank Crawford, hired in 1893, as its first official head coach. Early in the twentieth century, Nebraska became a regional power under Walter C. Booth – during a twenty-four-game win streak from 1901 to 1904, it was written that Booth could "weep with Alexander the Great because there are no more teams to conquer," given Nebraska's difficulty finding competitive and willing opposition in the Midwest. Twenty-four-year-old Ewald O. "Jumbo" Stiehm was hired in 1911 as the school's first full-time coach. Stiehm lost just two games in five seasons and his 8–0 1915 team was retroactively awarded a national championship.

Dana X. Bible and Biff Jones guided Nebraska to eight conference championships through the 1920s and 1930s, and Jones took the program to its first bowl game before being recalled to serve in World War II. Seven head coaches had little success in the postwar years until Bob Devaney was hired in 1962. Devaney turned Nebraska into a national power by the end of the decade, winning national championships in 1970 and 1971. Offensive coordinator Tom Osborne succeeded Devaney in 1973, beginning a twenty-five-year tenure that established him as one of college football's greatest coaches. Despite remarkable consistency – Osborne's teams never won fewer than nine games and were nationally ranked for 304 of his 307 games – he did not break through and win a major-poll national championship until 1994. Osborne retired in 1997 after two more titles and turned the program over to longtime assistant Frank Solich.

Solich took Nebraska to the 2002 BCS National Championship Game, but dropped to 7–7 the next year and was fired in 2003. After a lengthy coaching search, Nebraska settled on Bill Callahan, who overhauled the program in four turbulent years before being fired in 2007 and replaced by Bo Pelini. Pelini won at least nine games in each of his seven seasons, but frequent clashes with school administration (and some with program supporters) led to his firing. Nebraska suffered its worst eight-year stretch in over sixty years under Mike Riley and Scott Frost before hiring Matt Rhule in 2023.

== Championships ==
=== National championships ===
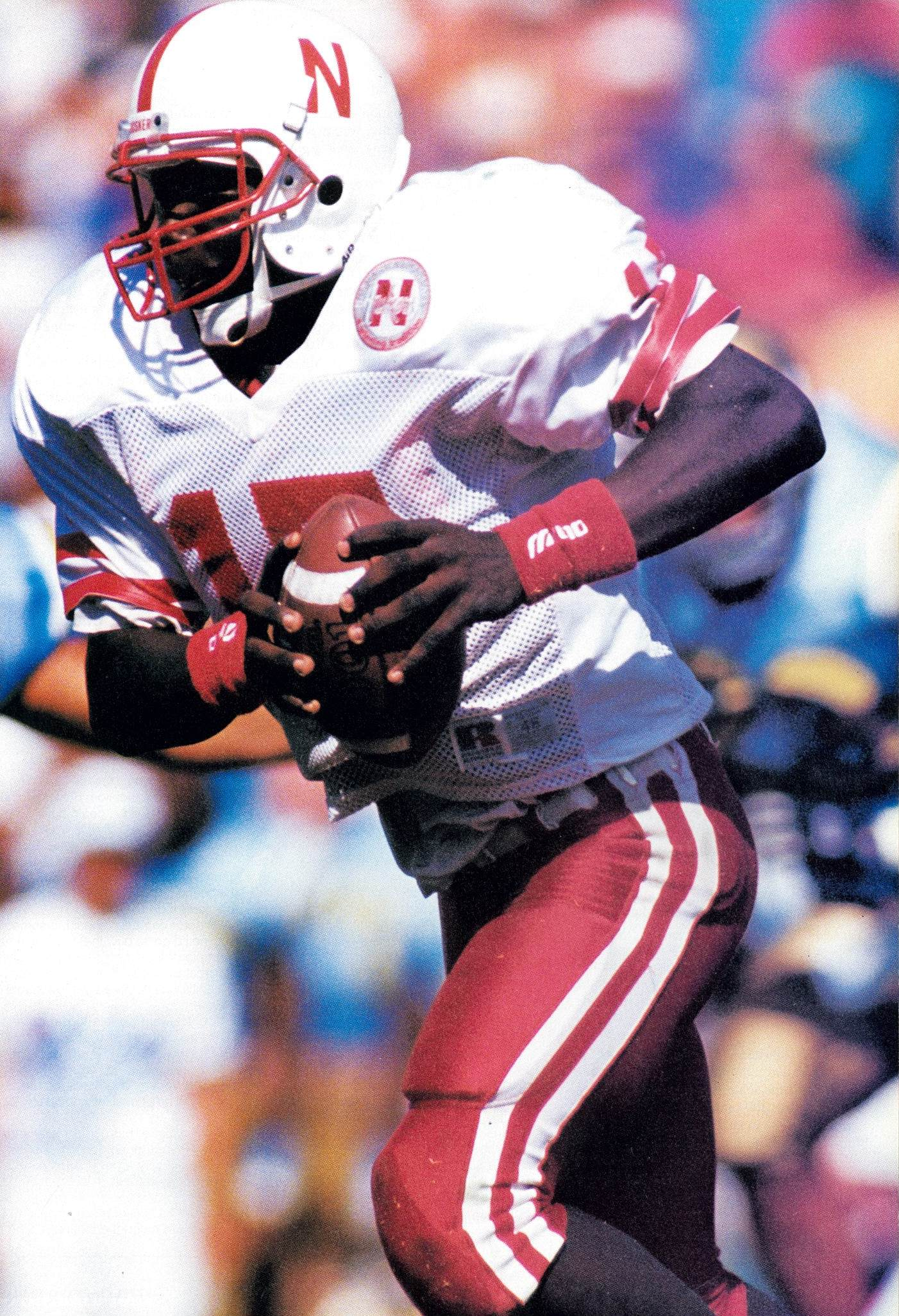
Tommie Frazier was named most valuable player of three consecutive national championship games

Nebraska claims five national championships, each awarded by the AP poll or the Coaches poll.

1970 and 1971

Nebraska's first titles came less than a decade into Bob Devaney's tenure. Devaney used a quarterback rotation between Jerry Tagge and Van Brownson throughout 1970, and the two led NU to nine consecutive wins after a tie at USC. On New Year's Day, bowl losses by No. 1 Texas and No. 2 Ohio State allowed No. 3 Nebraska to claim the national title with an Orange Bowl win over LSU. Trailing 12–10 in the fourth quarter, Tagge led a sixty-seven-yard drive to give NU a lead it would not relinquish. Nebraska was the presumptive title favorite over one-loss Notre Dame, but Devaney still campaigned after the game: "even the Pope would have to vote us number one." The next day Nebraska was elected national champion, its first from a major selector.

With Tagge as the unquestioned starter, Nebraska spent most of 1971 as the country's number-one team, winning each of its first eleven games by at least twenty-four points to set up a Thanksgiving Day meeting with No. 2 Oklahoma. The headline matchup of "The Game of the Century" was Nebraska's defense (allowing 6.4 points per game) against Oklahoma's wishbone offense (scoring 44.6 points per game). Nebraska's 35–31 victory was viewed by fifty-five million people in the United States, the largest college football audience ever. NU beat Alabama 38–6 in the Orange Bowl to defend its national title, becoming the first champion to defeat the No. 2, No. 3, and No. 4 finishers in the AP poll. NU's 1971 team is considered among the best in college football history.

1994, 1995, and 1997

After twenty years of close calls and a last-second title game loss in 1993, Tom Osborne entered the 1994 season still seeking his first consensus national championship as a head coach. Star quarterback Tommie Frazier was ruled out indefinitely in September and backup Brook Berringer led Nebraska through most of an undefeated regular season, including a 24–7 win over No. 2 Colorado. Frazier returned to start the 1995 Orange Bowl against Miami; a pair of fourth-quarter Cory Schlesinger touchdowns against a worn-down Hurricanes defensive front gave Osborne his first consensus title. Frazier and freshman I-back Ahman Green led NU through a turbulent 1995 season, defeating three top-ten opponents in a four-week stretch by an average of 28.3 points. Nebraska intercepted Danny Wuerffel three times in a 62–24 domination of Florida in the 1996 Fiesta Bowl. Frazier rushed for 199 of NU's 629 yards and was named most valuable player of a third consecutive national championship game. Nebraska's 1995 team, considered among the best ever, set a college football record with 53.2 points per game and is the only national champion to win every game by at least fourteen points.

Nebraska opened 1997 outside the national top five, but quarterback Scott Frost weathered early-season struggles to lead NU to a win at second-ranked Washington. The Cornhuskers were not tested until a November trip to Columbia – No. 1 Nebraska beat Missouri in overtime after a game-tying touchdown that was deflected in the end zone (the "Flea Kicker"), but dropped in the AP and Coaches polls. A month later Nebraska beat Texas A&M 54–15 for its first Big 12 title. NU still trailed Michigan in both polls, but its Orange Bowl matchup with Tennessee was the designated Bowl Alliance national championship game. The Cornhuskers controlled the first half and put the game away with three long third-quarter touchdown drives, after which Frost gave an emotional speech lobbying for Nebraska to be voted number one. Nebraska narrowly passed Michigan in the Coaches poll to claim its third national title in four years.

| Year | Coach | Record | Bowl | Result | AP | Coaches |
|---|---|---|---|---|---|---|
| 1970 | Bob Devaney | 11–0–1 | Orange | W 17–12 vs. LSU | No. 1 | No. 3 (Note: Until 1974, the final Coaches Poll was published at the conclusion of the regular season.) |
| 1971 | Bob Devaney | 13–0 | Orange | W 38–6 vs. Alabama | No. 1 | No. 1 |
| 1994 | Tom Osborne | 13–0 | Orange (BC NCG) | W 24–17 vs. Miami (FL) | No. 1 | No. 1 |
| 1995 | Tom Osborne | 12–0 | Fiesta (BA NCG) | W 62–24 vs. Florida | No. 1 | No. 1 |
| 1997 | Tom Osborne | 13–0 | Orange (BA NCG) | W 42–17 vs. Tennessee | No. 2 | No. 1 |

Unclaimed national championships

Nebraska has been awarded seven other national championships from NCAA-designated major selectors the school does not claim.

| Year | Coach | Record | Bowl | Result | AP | Coaches | Selector |
|---|---|---|---|---|---|---|---|
| 1915 | Ewald O. Stiehm | 8–0 | None | | N/A | | BR |
| 1980 | Tom Osborne | 10–2 | Sun | W 31–17 vs. Mississippi State | No. 7 | No. 7 | FACT |
| 1981 | Tom Osborne | 9–3 | Orange | L 22–15 vs. Clemson | No. 11 | No. 9 | NCF |
| 1982 | Tom Osborne | 12–1 | Orange | W 21–20 vs. LSU | No. 3 | No. 3 | B(QPRS) |
| 1983 | Tom Osborne | 12–1 | Orange | L 31–30 vs. Miami (FL) | No. 2 | No. 2 | B(QPRS), DeS, FACT, L, MGR, PS, SR |
| 1984 | Tom Osborne | 10–2 | Sugar | W 28–10 vs. LSU | No. 4 | No. 3 | L |
| 1993 | Tom Osborne | 11–1 | Orange (BC NCG) | L 18–16 vs. Florida State | No. 3 | No. 3 | NCF |

=== Conference championships ===
Nebraska has won forty-six conference championships, second-most of any FBS school. The earliest came in the short-lived Western Interstate University Football Association, one of college football's first conferences, which NU participated in for six seasons with Iowa, Kansas, and Missouri. The conference dissolved in 1897 and NU spent the next decade as an independent until the Missouri Valley Intercollegiate Athletic Association was founded in 1907. Nebraska dominated the MVIAA in its early years, winning twenty-one titles before 1940 despite playing several seasons as an independent. After Biff Jones departed the school to serve in World War II, the program went twenty-two seasons without a conference championship.

Devaney was hired in 1962 and quickly ended Nebraska's drought, winning eight titles in eleven years as head coach. Osborne succeeded him in 1973 and won thirteen conference championships; the Thanksgiving-weekend meeting between Nebraska and Oklahoma often became a de facto Big Eight championship game, as the two schools won at least a share of the conference thirty-three times in its final thirty-six years. Nebraska won the second Big 12 Championship Game in 1997, Osborne's final season, and again two years later.

| Year | Coach | Overall | Conference |
|---|---|---|---|
WIUFA (1892–1897)
| 1894† | Frank Crawford | 6–2 | 2–1 |
| 1895† | Charles Thomas | 6–3 | 2–1 |
| 1897 | Edward N. Robinson | 5–1 | 3–0 |
MVIAA / Big Eight Conference (1907–1918, 1921–1995)
| 1907† | William C. Cole | 8–2 | 1–0 |
| 1910 | William C. Cole | 7–1 | 2–0 |
| 1911† | Ewald O. Stiehm | 5–1–2 | 2–0–1 |
| 1912† | Ewald O. Stiehm | 7–1 | 2–0 |
| 1913† | Ewald O. Stiehm | 8–0 | 3–0 |
| 1914 | Ewald O. Stiehm | 7–0–1 | 3–0 |
| 1915 | Ewald O. Stiehm | 8–0 | 4–0 |
| 1916 | E. J. Stewart | 6–2 | 3–1 |
| 1917 | E. J. Stewart | 5–2 | 2–0 |
| 1921 | Fred Dawson | 7–1 | 3–0 |
| 1922 | Fred Dawson | 7–1 | 5–0 |
| 1923 | Fred Dawson | 4–2–2 | 3–0–2 |
| 1928 | Ernest Bearg | 7–1–1 | 4–0 |
| 1929 | Dana X. Bible | 4–1–3 | 3–0–2 |
| 1931 | Dana X. Bible | 8–2 | 5–0 |
| 1932 | Dana X. Bible | 7–1–1 | 5–0 |
| 1933 | Dana X. Bible | 8–1 | 5–0 |
| 1935 | Dana X. Bible | 6–2–1 | 4–0–1 |
| 1936 | Dana X. Bible | 7–2 | 5–0 |
| 1937 | Biff Jones | 6–1–2 | 3–0–2 |
| 1940 | Biff Jones | 8–2 | 5–0 |
| 1963 | Bob Devaney | 10–1 | 7–0 |
| 1964 | Bob Devaney | 9–2 | 6–1 |
| 1965 | Bob Devaney | 10–1 | 7–0 |
| 1966 | Bob Devaney | 9–2 | 6–1 |
| 1969† | Bob Devaney | 9–2 | 6–1 |
| 1970 | Bob Devaney | 11–0–1 | 7–0 |
| 1971 | Bob Devaney | 13–0 | 7–0 |
| 1972 (Note: In early 1973, Oklahoma forfeited eight wins from the previous season when it was discovered the Sooners had used players ineligible under NCAA rules, which gave second-place Nebraska the 1972 Big Eight title. Decades later, Oklahoma reversed course and recognized these wins. Both schools claim the championship.) | Bob Devaney | 9–2–1 | 5–1–1 |
| 1975† | Tom Osborne | 10–2 | 6–1 |
| 1978† | Tom Osborne | 9–3 | 6–1 |
| 1981 | Tom Osborne | 9–3 | 7–0 |
| 1982 | Tom Osborne | 12–1 | 7–0 |
| 1983 | Tom Osborne | 12–1 | 7–0 |
| 1984† | Tom Osborne | 10–2 | 6–1 |
| 1988 | Tom Osborne | 11–2 | 7–0 |
| 1991† | Tom Osborne | 9–2–1 | 6–0–1 |
| 1992 | Tom Osborne | 9–3 | 6–1 |
| 1993 | Tom Osborne | 11–1 | 7–0 |
| 1994 | Tom Osborne | 13–0 | 7–0 |
| 1995 | Tom Osborne | 12–0 | 7–0 |
Big 12 Conference (1996–2010)
| 1997 | Tom Osborne | 13–0 | 8–0 |
| 1999 | Frank Solich | 12–1 | 7–1 |

† Co-champion

=== Division championships ===
Nebraska won ten division championships. Nine were in the Big 12's North Division, which NU played in from the Big 12's inception in 1996 until departing for the Big Ten in 2011 (the Big Eight never used divisions). Nebraska won one division title across thirteen seasons in the Big Ten's Leaders Division and West Division; the conference disbanded its division system in 2024.

| Year | Coach | Overall | Conference | Conference championship game |
|---|---|---|---|---|
Big 12 Conference (North Division) (1996–2010)
| 1996 | Tom Osborne | 11–2 | 8–0 | L 37–27 vs. Texas |
| 1997 | Tom Osborne | 13–0 | 8–0 | W 54–15 vs. Texas A&M |
| 1999 | Frank Solich | 12–1 | 7–1 | W 22–6 vs. Texas |
| 2000† | Frank Solich | 10–2 | 6–2 | Lost tiebreaker to Kansas State |
| 2001† | Frank Solich | 11–2 | 7–1 | Lost tiebreaker to Colorado |
| 2006 | Bill Callahan | 9–5 | 6–2 | L 21–7 vs. Oklahoma |
| 2008† | Bo Pelini | 9–4 | 5–3 | Lost tiebreaker to Missouri |
| 2009 | Bo Pelini | 10–4 | 6–2 | L 13–12 vs. Texas |
| 2010† | Bo Pelini | 10–4 | 6–2 | L 23–20 vs. Oklahoma |
Big Ten Conference (Legends Division) (2011–2013)
| 2012 | Bo Pelini | 10–4 | 7–1 | L 70–31 vs. Wisconsin |

† Co-champion

== Bowl games ==
Nebraska has played in 55 bowl games, including a record thirty-five straight from 1969 to 2003, with a record of 27–28. (Note: Florida State reached a bowl game in thirty-six consecutive seasons from 1982 to 2017, but its 2006 Emerald Bowl appearance was vacated by the NCAA, which recognizes Nebraska as the record holder.)

In 1915, Nebraska was invited to face Northwest Conference champion Washington State in the second bowl game ever played, but university officials balked at the cost of sending the team to Pasadena and declined. NU played its first bowl game in the 1941 Rose Bowl, losing to eventual national champion Stanford. Nebraska was invited to the 1955 Orange Bowl despite its 6–4 record (conference rules prevented champion Oklahoma from appearing in consecutive seasons), falling to Duke 34–7 at Burdine Stadium (later the Miami Orange Bowl) in its first of seventeen Orange Bowl appearances.

Bob Devaney's inaugural season ended with the first bowl victory in program history, a 36–34 win over Miami in the 1962 Gotham Bowl. Three years later, he took Nebraska to its first national championship game (though it was not yet an official designation) against Alabama in the 1966 Orange Bowl; Bear Bryant's Crimson Tide won 39–28 in the first of three bowl meetings between the coaches. Nebraska did not appear in a bowl game in 1967 or 1968, but returned to postseason play in 1969 and began an NCAA-record streak of thirty-five consecutive seasons with a bowl appearance. NU won eight of its first nine games in this stretch under Devaney and Osborne, including two national championships. Nebraska regularly featured in the Orange Bowl due to the Big Eight's bowl affiliations; its 1984 defeat to Miami is considered one of college football's greatest games.

NU lost seven straight bowl games two decades into Osborne's tenure, many of them uncompetitive defeats to southeastern opposition. After a controversial championship game loss in 1993, he won his first major-poll national championship in 1994, avenging three previous Orange Bowl losses to Miami. Osborne retired after taking Nebraska to seven straight New Year's Six bowl games. NU's lengthy bowl streak continued through Frank Solich's tenure but ended in 2004.

Nebraska missed a bowl game in 2017 for the first time in ten years, beginning a seven-year stretch without postseason play that covered Scott Frost's entire tenure as head coach. Nebraska returned to a bowl game in 2024.

== Venues ==
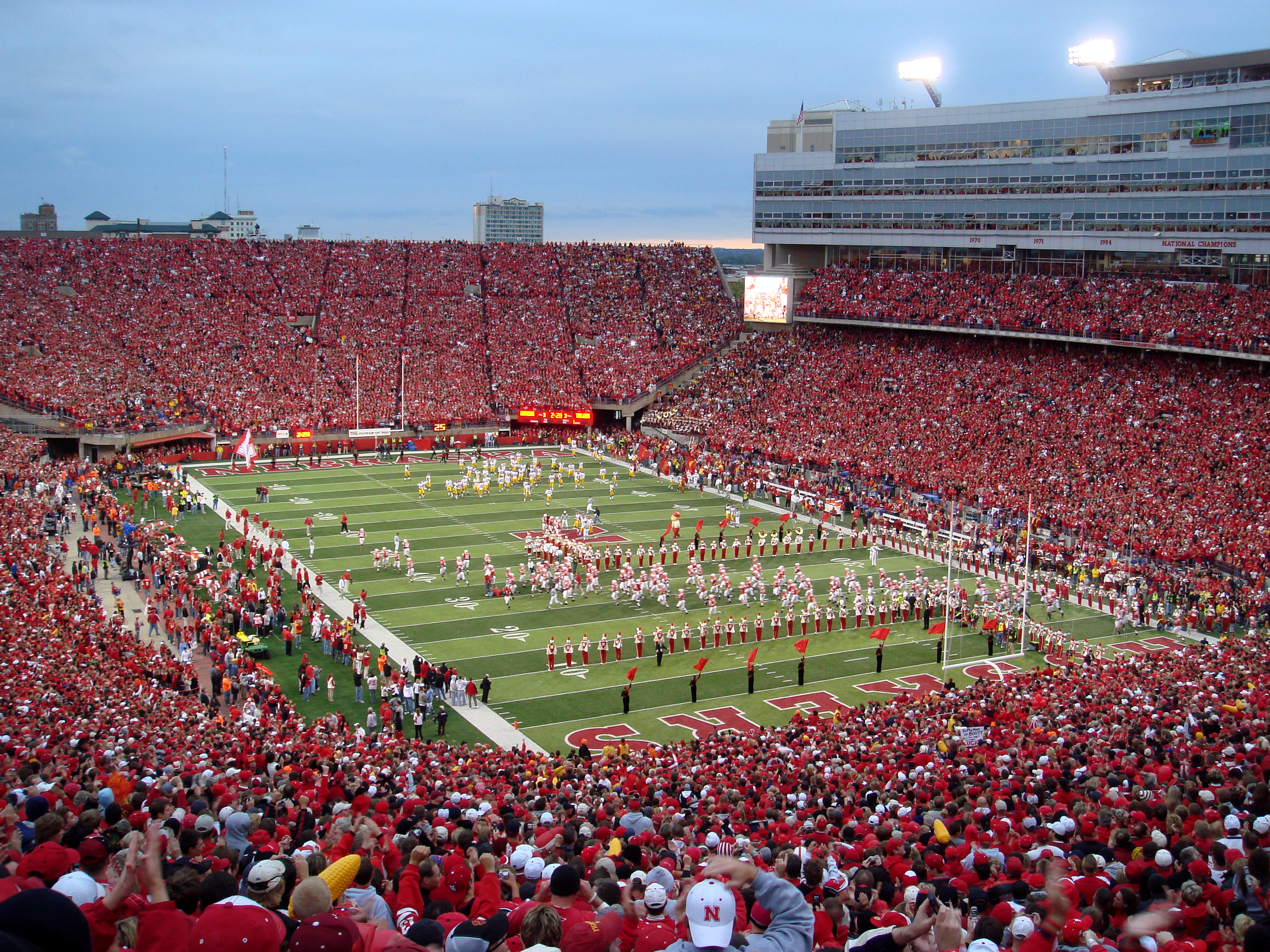
Nebraska has played at Memorial Stadium since 1923 and sold out every game at the venue since 1962

=== Nebraska Field ===
Prior to 1908, Nebraska played home games at Antelope Field, a makeshift football venue that was "either as hard as a pavement or a sea of mud." Earl Eager, the school's second manager of athletics, prepared much of the land for the new stadium, which opened at the corner of North 10th and T Street in 1909. Nebraska Field's main seating area was a wooden grandstand on its south sideline with bleachers along both sides.

NU was 28–0–2 at Nebraska Field under Jumbo Stiehm, who was subject to such frequent outbursts that the school established a women's sitting section far from the home sideline. By 1915, there was considerable momentum toward a steel-and-concrete stadium due to the program's success and the already-deteriorating state of Nebraska Field. Stiehm's departure and American entry into World War I temporarily slowed this momentum, but by the early 1920s, with "the present athletic field as inadequate now as the old one was in 1907," the university began plans to build a new stadium. The final game at the stadium was a 14–6 NU victory over Notre Dame on November 30, 1922. Nebraska Field was torn down in early 1923 and Memorial Stadium was constructed on the site.

=== Memorial Stadium ===
Memorial Stadium, nicknamed "The Sea of Red," has served as Nebraska's home venue since 1923. The university began planning a new stadium complex shortly after World War I to replace the outdated Nebraska Field. Construction began in mid-1923 after a lengthy fundraising campaign and several design iterations. The unfinished Memorial Stadium opened on October 13, 1923, dedicated to honor Nebraskans who served in the American Civil War, the Spanish–American War, and World War I. The stadium was built with grandstands along its east and west sidelines; its capacity of 31,080 was unchanged until end zone bleachers were installed decades later. Major expansions of East, West, and North Stadium between 1999 and 2013 raised capacity to 85,458 and completely enclosed the original superstructure, which remains largely intact. Attendance regularly exceeded 90,000 in the past, though proposed future renovations will likely reduce capacity.

Nebraska has sold out 417 consecutive games at Memorial Stadium, an NCAA record for any sport that dates to 1962. In 2023, Memorial Stadium hosted "Volleyball Day in Nebraska" – the announced attendance of 92,003 was a stadium record and the highest ever recorded for a women's sporting event. The venue's listed capacity of 85,458 is thirteenth-highest among collegiate stadiums and twenty-fifth worldwide. Memorial Stadium is often listed among the best venues in college football.

== Traditions ==
=== Gameday traditions ===
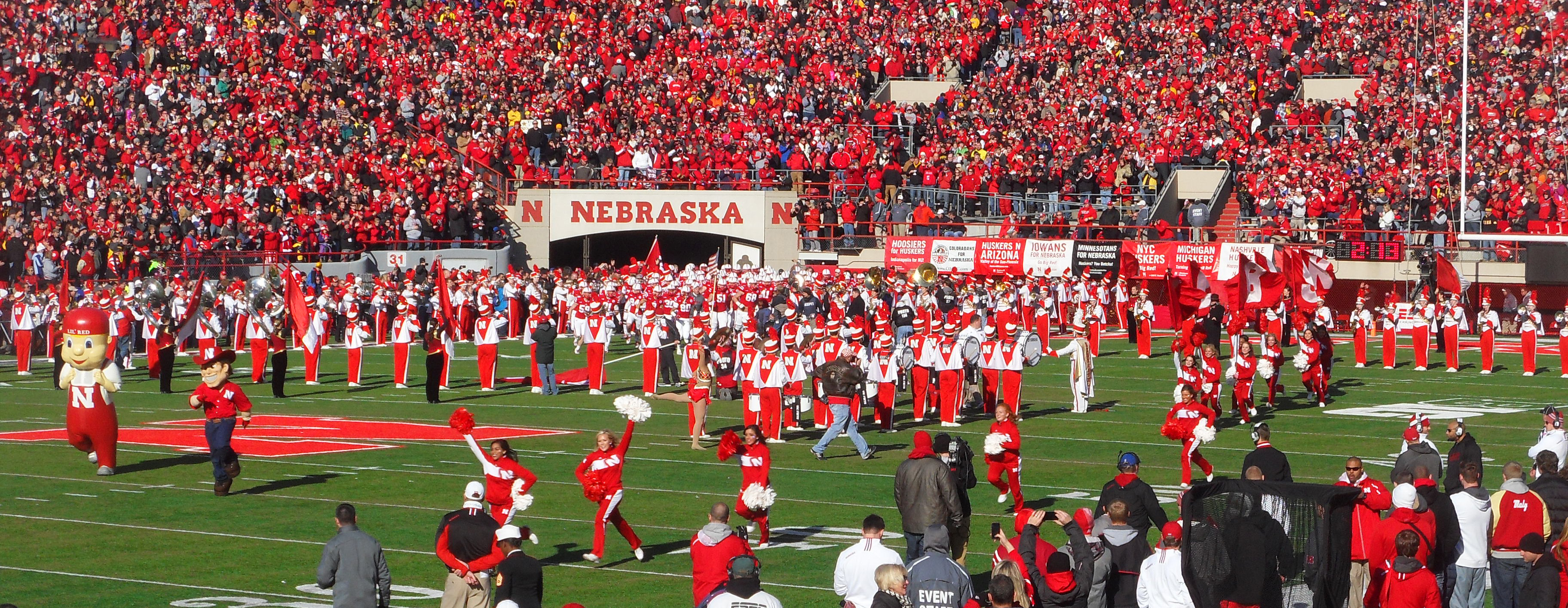
The Tunnel Walk on Nov. 29, 2013

Since 1994, Nebraska's home games have opened with the "Tunnel Walk" as the team takes the field before kickoff, typically to the Alan Parsons Project instrumental "Sirius." The team historically emerged from the southwest corner of the field; the entrance moved to the northwest corner upon completion of the Osborne Athletic Complex in 2006, and again to the northeast corner when the home locker room was moved to the Osborne Legacy Complex in 2023. The Tunnel Walk is preceded by a "Husker Power" chant – half the crowd chants "Husker" in unison and the other half responds with "Power." The Cornhusker Marching Band, nicknamed "The Pride of All Nebraska," performs prior to every home game. As part of the pre-game show, the band plays the fight song of the visiting team, with the announcer saying beforehand, "We welcome our friends from [school's name]."

Fans at Memorial Stadium have released red helium balloons when Nebraska scores its first points since the 1960s, though the tradition was seen as early as 1932. Global helium shortages and environmental concerns have threatened the tradition, which was paused in 2012 and 2022.

The Memorial Stadium crowd has historically applauded the visiting team as it exits the field, regardless of the game's outcome.

=== Walk-on program ===
Nebraska accepted its first walk-ons in the early 1960s and began an official program in 1973 when the NCAA reduced the number of scholarships schools could offer. Nebraska stocked its program with walk-ons from across the region through Tom Osborne and Frank Solich's tenures, and its rosters were often unusually large. Osborne credited his walk-ons with allowing flexibility to better scout future opponents and provided them the same access to training facilities and academic counseling as players on scholarship. Though the expansive walk-on program is most often associated with Osborne, the school typically maintained larger-than-usual rosters for years after his retirement. Traditional walk-on programs were essentially ended when the NCAA began limiting roster sizes in 2024.

Six former Nebraska walk-ons have become All-Americans and 25 have been drafted into the National Football League.

=== Uniform history ===
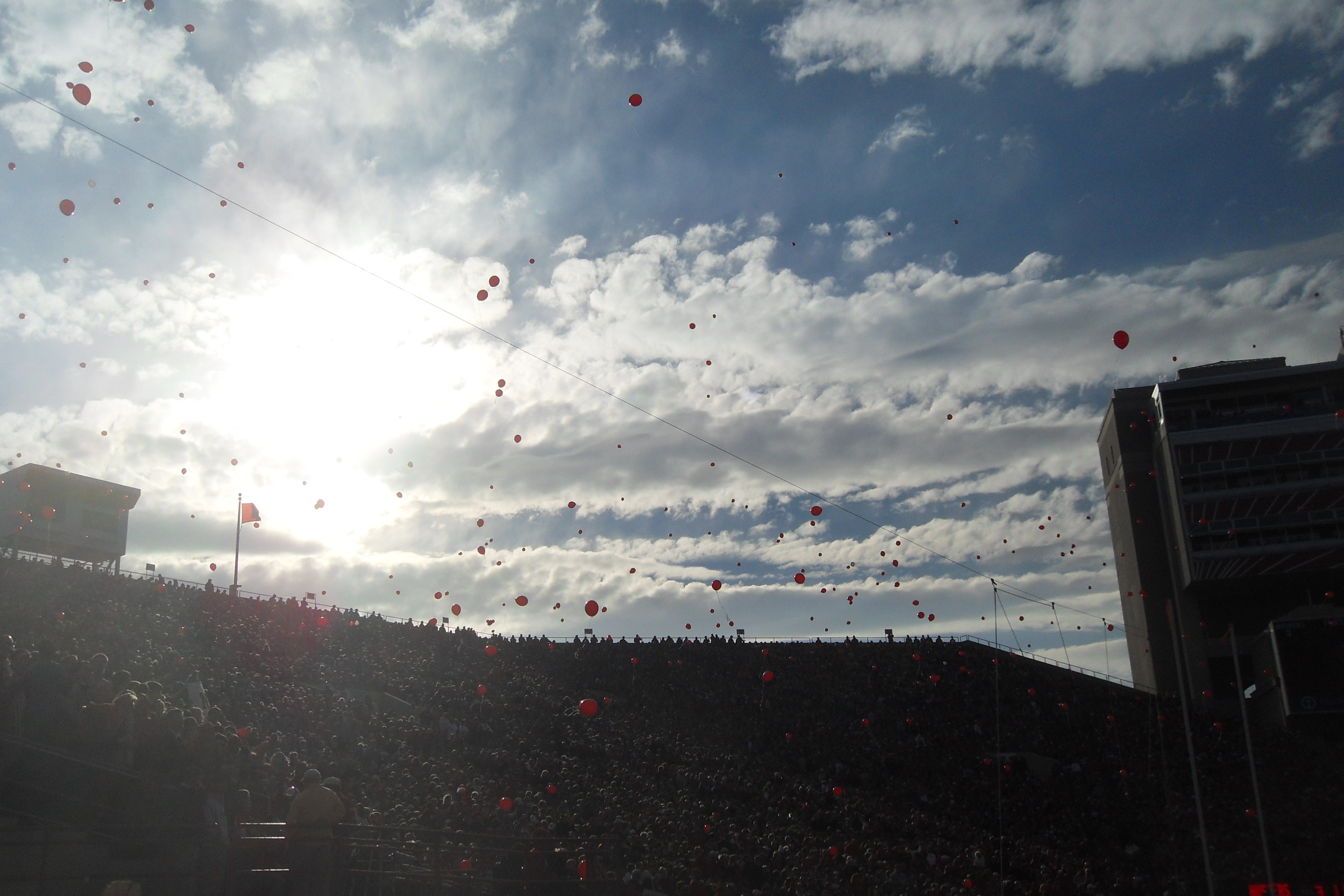
Fans release red helium balloons to celebrate a Nebraska field goal on Nov. 17, 2012

Helmets

Nebraska alternated between plain white or red helmets as early as 1930, adding a single stripe in 1953 and jersey numbers in 1957. In the 1960s the red helmets were eliminated and the numbers replaced by a red, offset "NU." In 1970, a shortage of "U" stickers necessitated the use of the now-familiar single "N"; the change was made permanent after a national championship season. Aside from a facemask swap from gray to red, the helmet design is unchanged since.

Jerseys

In its early days, Nebraska frequently swapped jersey designs and colors on a season-by-season (or game-by-game) basis. They were usually red or scarlet in color and sometimes featured a single "N" on the chest, but no consistent design was used until jersey numbers were added to solid-colored uniforms in 1933.

Small sleeve stripes were added in 1946, increasing in size in the late 1950s until being phased out as mesh and tearaway material became popular. From 1980 to 1983, Nebraska's jerseys featured just an "N" on the sleeves. Stripes and TV numbers were permanently re-added in 1984, although both decreased in size as sleeves shortened. In 1989, a patch was added to the left shoulder to commemorate the hundredth season of Nebraska football; it remained for future seasons and was altered to read "Nebraska Football: A Winning Tradition." Player last names appeared on jerseys for bowl games starting with the 1971 Orange Bowl and for road games in 1980, but home jerseys remained nameless except for seniors playing their final home game. Last names were permanently affixed to all jerseys in 1988.

Nebraska's defense is often referred to as the "Blackshirts," a reference to the black jerseys worn by starting defensive players during practice. The tradition originated in 1964 (the first season of free substitution) when Bob Devaney wanted a way to more quickly distinguish between various units. Depictions of the Blackshirts often include a skull and crossbones.

Pants

Nebraska's pants had two stripes down each side from 1968 through 1994 before being removed in 1995. In 2002, Nebraska featured large side panels on its jersey and pants, and wore all-white in every road game – the changes were unpopular among fans and most were reverted, which included the return of pant stripes. Pant stripes were again removed during Scott Frost's tenure as head coach as a tribute to the style from his playing career, and returned under Matt Rhule.

Nebraska traditionally wears white pants at home and red on the road, with rare exceptions. The team donned red pants with red jerseys for its 1986 contest with Oklahoma, but the combination was unofficially retired after a Nebraska loss. Nebraska first wore all-white uniforms in the 1991 Florida Citrus Bowl and its first three road games of 1992; NU lost three of these games and "surrender suits" have been used sporadically in the decades since.

Alternate uniforms

The first documented instance of Nebraska wearing non-standard uniforms was against South Dakota in 1920 – the Cornhuskers were forced into blue practice jerseys when the visiting Coyotes mistakenly brought their home reds to Lincoln. Three years later, Nebraska again wore blue against Oklahoma in the first-ever game at Memorial Stadium. Nebraska celebrated the stadium's hundredth anniversary in 2023, wearing blue-trimmed jerseys to commemorate the occasion.

Nebraska has worn alternate uniforms for one game in most seasons since 2009. Many of these were throwback or "fauxback" uniforms to commemorate past events or championships. Nebraska and Wisconsin played the first "Adidas Unrivaled" game in 2012; both schools wore uniforms featuring block letters instead of front numbers. NU wore non-throwback alternate designs several times over the following decade, including Blackshirts-themed uniforms in 2019 and 2020.

Adidas has been Nebraska's official shoe and uniform sponsor since 1996. In 2017, the school and sponsor signed an eleven-year, $128-million apparel deal.

== Sellout streak ==
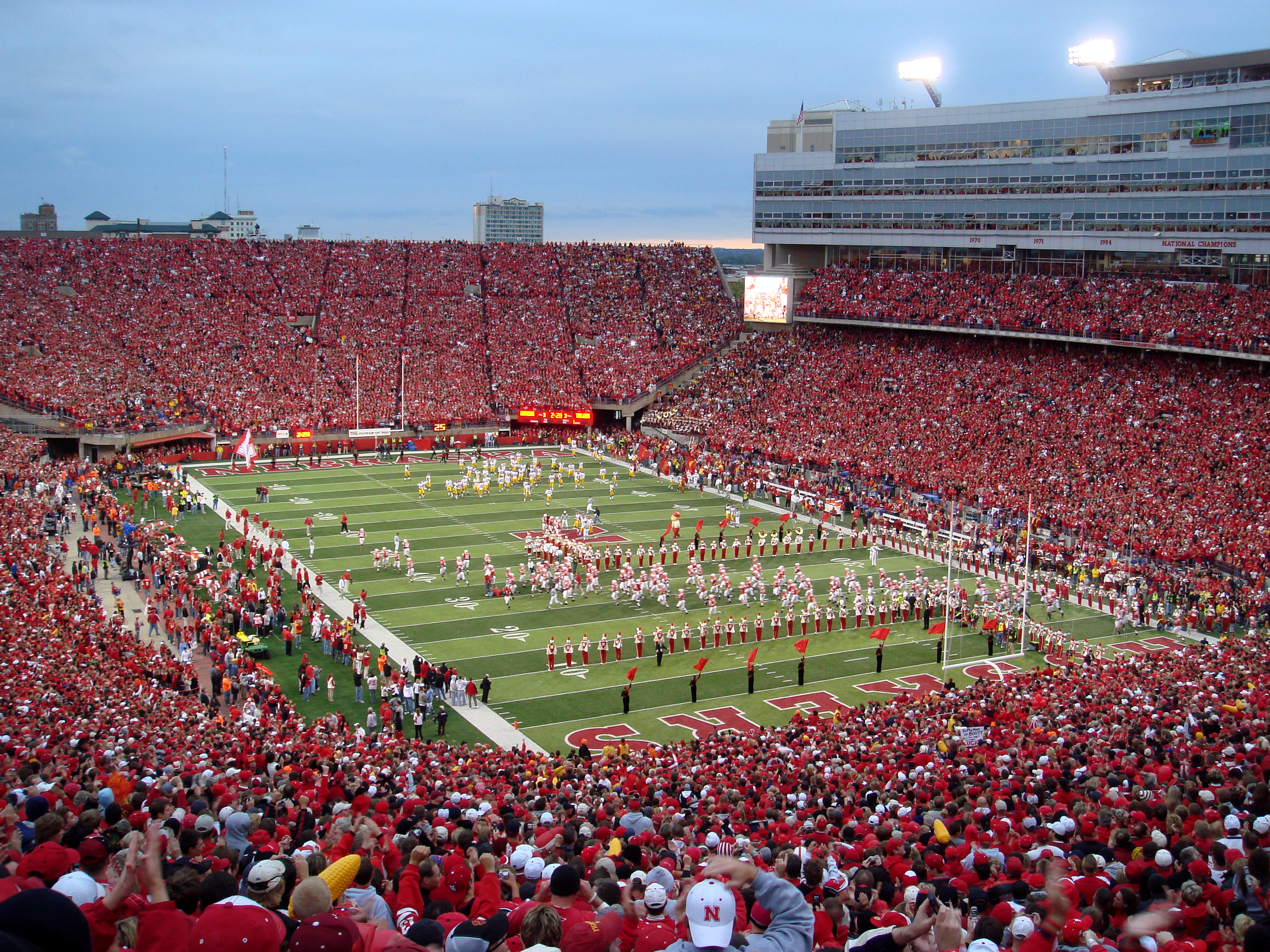
Memorial Stadium, the site of Nebraska's NCAA-record sellout streak

Nebraska has sold out 411 consecutive home games at Memorial Stadium, an NCAA record for any sport that dates to 1962. The team's record during the streak is 327–77.

Early dominance

Bob Devaney was hired in 1962 and quickly turned around Nebraska's program, which struggled for two decades following World War II. The sellout streak began on November 3 of Devaney's first season, a 16–7 Missouri victory over Nebraska in front of a crowd of 36,501. After back-to-back 6–4 seasons in the late 1960s (Devaney later expressed surprise the streak survived this stretch) he established a national power, leading separate home win streaks of twenty and twenty-three games before his retirement in 1972.

Under Devaney's successor Tom Osborne, Nebraska celebrated its hundredth consecutive sellout on September 15, 1979, against Utah State, though this was actually number ninety-nine, an error that wasn't discovered for nearly a decade. Sellout 100 came two weeks later, a 42–17 win over Penn State. The streak persisted relatively untested through most of Osborne's tenure, but was threatened in 1990 when declining enrollment meant Nebraska nearly did not sell its entire allotment of student tickets. The school enlisted local businesses to ensure the streak's survival.

The streak reached 200 on October 29, 1994, a win over second-ranked Colorado in the middle of a forty-seven-game home win streak, third-longest in major college football history. The win streak ended in 1998, Frank Solich's first season as head coach, when Texas became the first unranked team to win in Lincoln since 1978. Solich's team began another lengthy home win streak, highlighted by a 2001 win over Oklahoma in the first regular season No. 1 versus No. 2 game in BCS history. (Note: Oklahoma was ranked first and Nebraska second by the BCS, but both were ranked behind eventual national champion Miami in the AP and Coaches polls.) Solich was fired in 2003 after a 38–9 loss to Kansas State, NU's first home loss by more than two possessions since the sellout streak began.

Close calls and criticism

The sellout streak, traditionally a source of pride for the program and its supporters, has been criticized in the years since Solich's dismissal as Nebraska has struggled on the field and occasionally in the stands. Nebraska ended several 2007 games to thousands of empty seats, prompting Osborne to worry about the streak's survival: "they're relatively loyal, more than most any place around the country. But they're human. If you have sustained losing seasons, anybody gets discouraged." The university considers a game a sellout as long as every ticket is sold, regardless of actual usage, and has been forced to sell large groups of tickets to donors and corporate sponsors to keep the streak intact.

Nebraska went 12–20 at home between 2017 and 2022 under Scott Frost, and the number of tickets scanned was often far below capacity. The sellout streak survived Frost's tenure thanks largely to a donor purchase of 2,400 discounted tickets against Fordham in 2021; though many of these were returned from Fordham's allotment, it was one of several bulk sales required to keep the streak alive. The tickets were distributed to local youth in what athletic director Trev Alberts called the "Red Carpet Experience." Months after Frost's firing a year later, Alberts publicly stated the sellout streak was on "life support" prior to Nebraska's 2022 game against Indiana.

The sellout streak reached 400 in 2024, a 31–24 overtime loss to Illinois in the first matchup of ranked teams at Memorial Stadium since 2013. At 411, Nebraska's sellout streak is over twice as long as the country's second-longest.

Milestone games

| Nebraska win | Nebraska loss |

| No. | Date | Winning team | | Losing team | | Attendance |
|---|---|---|---|---|---|---|
| 1 | Nov. 3, 1962 | Missouri | 16 | Nebraska | 7 | 36,501 |
| 50 | Oct. 2, 1971 | No. 1 Nebraska | 42 | Utah State | 6 | 67,421 |
| 100 | Sep. 29, 1979 | No. 6 Nebraska | 42 | No. 18 Penn State | 17 | 76,151 |
| 150 | Sep. 12, 1987 | No. 2 Nebraska | 42 | No. 3 UCLA | 33 | 76,313 |
| 200 | Oct. 29, 1994 | No. 3 Nebraska | 24 | No. 2 Colorado | 7 | 76,131 |
| 250 | Sep. 7, 2002 | No. 9 Nebraska | 44 | Utah State | 13 | 78,176 |
| 300 | Sep. 26, 2009 | No. 25 Nebraska | 55 | Louisiana–Lafayette | 0 | 86,304 |
| 350 | Sep. 17, 2016 | Nebraska | 35 | No. 22 Oregon | 32 | 90,414 |
| 400 | Sep. 20, 2024 | No. 24 Illinois | 31 | No. 22 Nebraska | 24 | 86,936 |

== Rivalries ==
=== Colorado ===
Nebraska and Colorado first met on November 17, 1898, a 23–10 Nebraska win in Boulder, and began playing regularly when CU joined the MVIAA in 1948. A bison head named Mr. Chip was presented to the victor throughout the 1950s; the exchange ended when Colorado's Heart and Dagger Society misplaced the trophy. The rivalry gained traction in 1982 when Bill McCartney declared Nebraska to be CU's primary rival to much ridicule, as the Buffaloes were among the country's worst programs at the time. McCartney rebuilt Colorado, defeating NU in 1986, 1989 and 1990 to become the first program since World War II to wrest control of the Big Eight from Nebraska and Oklahoma in consecutive seasons.

Colorado replaced Oklahoma as Nebraska's traditional Thanksgiving weekend opponent when the Big 12 was established in 1996 (the Cornhuskers and Buffaloes were placed in the North Division with four other Big Eight members; the Sooners, Oklahoma State and the Texas schools were placed in the South Division, meaning Nebraska and Oklahoma would not meet every season). Nebraska regained control of the series in the 1990s with nine straight wins, many of them nationally significant. Colorado ended this streak in 2001 with a 62–36 win over No. 1 Nebraska that led to one of the first BCS controversies when one-loss NU was selected to play in the national championship game over two-loss CU, which defeated Texas in the Big 12 championship game. The teams no longer play annually but have met four times since each departed the Big 12 in 2010 (Colorado rejoined in 2024).

Nebraska leads the series 50–21–2. No future meetings are scheduled.

=== Iowa ===
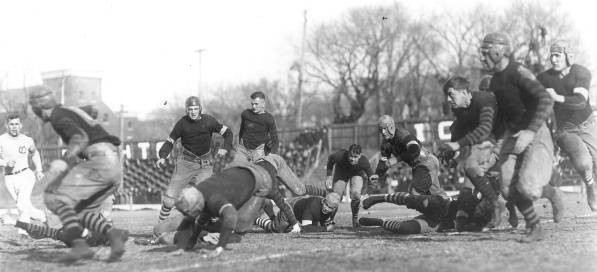
Nebraska vs. Iowa at Iowa Field on Nov. 25, 1916

Nebraska and Iowa first met on November 26, 1891, a 22–0 Hawkeyes win in Omaha that was NU's first game against an out-of-state opponent. A year later the schools became founding members of the Western Interstate University Football Association and played annually in Omaha (or suburb Council Bluffs) until Iowa joined the Big Nine (now the Big Ten) in 1900. Due to the ease of travel between Lincoln and Iowa City, Nebraska and Iowa played regularly as out-of-conference opponents until shortly after World War II.

NU won five of just six games in the series from 1947 through 2010, though a 10–7 upset of No. 7 Nebraska in 1981 was instrumental in Hayden Fry's Iowa rebuild. The teams have played annually for the Heroes Trophy since Nebraska joined the Big Ten in 2011.

Following Big Ten expansion in 2024, the Hawkeyes are the Cornhuskers' only permanent conference opponent; Nebraska is one of three for Iowa, along with Minnesota and Wisconsin. Since joining the Big Ten, Nebraska has gone 4–11 against Iowa, losing 10 of the last 11 as of the 2025 season.

Nebraska leads the series 30–23–3. Iowa holds the Heroes Trophy after its 2025 win in Lincoln. The teams will play next in 2026.

=== Iowa State ===
Nebraska and Iowa State first met on November 19, 1896, a 12–4 Cornhuskers win in Lincoln. The schools were founding members of the Missouri Valley Intercollegiate Athletic Association (later the Big Eight) in 1907. From 1926 to 2010, the two schools played each other uninterrupted as they moved from the Big Eight to the Big 12. The series has been largely dominated by Nebraska, who during the 85-year consecutive playing streak, recorded their largest win over the Cyclones, a 77–14 win in Lincoln in 1997, when Tom Osborne won his last national title. The series ended in 2010, when Nebraska joined the Big Ten. The Cornhuskers won the last game in Ames, 31–30 in overtime.

Nebraska leads the series 85–18–2. No future games are scheduled.

=== Kansas ===
Nebraska and Kansas first met on November 12, 1892, a 12–0 Jayhawks win in Lincoln. The schools were founding members of the WIUFA in 1892 and the MVIAA (later the Big Eight) in 1907. Nebraska and Kansas played every season from 1906 to 2010, once the longest uninterrupted streak in Division I. The series, evenly matched in its early years, was largely dominated by Nebraska. The Cornhuskers won thirty-six straight games from 1969 to 2004, the second-longest win streak over an opponent in college football history. The series ended when Nebraska joined the Big Ten in 2010; Kansas sought entry as well but was denied.

Nebraska leads the series 91–23–3. No future games are scheduled.

=== Kansas State ===
Nebraska and Kansas State first met on October 14, 1911, a 59–0 Cornhuskers win in Lincoln. KSU joined the MVIAA in 1913 and threatened to boycott its game in Lincoln due to the presence of a black player on Nebraska's roster. Aggies head coach Guy Lowman claimed a gentlemen's agreement throughout the conference disallowed black athletes, but Nebraska denied this and the game was played as scheduled. Nebraska's 1939 trip to Manhattan was televised locally, the second televised college football game.

Nebraska dominated the rivalry for most of its duration, but the series intensified when KSU hired Bill Snyder. The teams met in Tokyo in the 1992 Mirage Bowl, a 38–24 Cornhuskers victory in Snyder's fourth season. Kansas State never defeated Tom Osborne, but ended its twenty-nine-year losing streak to Nebraska after his retirement; No. 2 KSU's 40–30 victory in 1998 was among the biggest wins in school history. KSU defeated NU four more times until the Cornhuskers left the Big 12 in 2010. With only 135 miles separating the schools, they were the nearest cross-border rivals in the Big Eight and Big 12.

Nebraska leads the series 78–15–2. No future games are scheduled.

=== Miami (FL) ===
Nebraska and Miami first met on November 30, 1951, a 19–7 Hurricanes win in Miami. Nebraska beat Miami for its first bowl victory in the 1962 Gotham Bowl, the first of six bowl meetings between the rivals. The 1984 Orange Bowl, considered among the best games in college football history, became a de facto national title game after a chaotic 1983 bowl season. Nebraska trailed most of the game until scoring with less than a minute remaining to make the score 31–30. Instead of attempting an extra point to tie the game and win the national championship, Tom Osborne elected to go for two and the outright win; Turner Gill's conversion pass fell incomplete and Miami won its first title. Miami established a dynasty and convincingly defeated Nebraska in the 1989 and 1992 Orange Bowl.

The teams met again in the 1995 Orange Bowl, the third Bowl Coalition-designated national championship game. Tommie Frazier led two fourth-quarter touchdown drives to give Osborne his first consensus national title as a head coach after decades of frustration. Seven years later, Nebraska was controversially selected to face Miami in the 2002 BCS national championship game; the favored Hurricanes won 37–14.

The series is tied 6–6. No future games are scheduled.

=== Minnesota ===
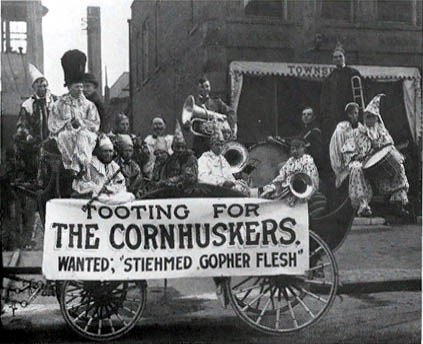
Supporters before Nebraska's game against Minnesota on Oct. 18, 1913

Nebraska and Minnesota first met on November 29, 1900, a 20–12 Golden Gophers win in Lincoln. The teams played annually through 1913, when Minnesota head coach Henry L. Williams, upset with Nebraska for its use of the "Minnesota shift," discontinued the series. It resumed in 1932 and was dominated by Minnesota until Nebraska hired Bob Devaney in 1962. The Cornhuskers won sixteen straight games over the Gophers under Devaney and Tom Osborne, including an 84–13 victory in Minneapolis in 1983.

The teams have played regularly since Nebraska joined the Big Ten in 2011. In 2014, the $5 Bits of Broken Chair Trophy was created out of a Twitter exchange between the official account for Minnesota mascot Goldy Gopher and the satirical "Faux Pelini." After publicized on-field exchanges in 2014 and 2015, the trophy disappeared without acknowledgement. It was reestablished by fans as an annual fundraiser for the University of Minnesota Masonic Children's Hospital and the Team Jack Foundation, without official association with either university.

Minnesota leads the series 38–25–2 and holds the $5 Bits of Broken Chair Trophy after its 2025 win in Minneapolis. The teams will play next in 2027.

=== Missouri ===
Nebraska and Missouri first met on November 5, 1892, a 1–0 (Note: Nebraska lists the final score as 1–0, while Missouri lists it as 6–0. The schools agree the result was a victory for Nebraska via Missouri forfeit.) forfeit win for Nebraska in Omaha after the Tigers refused to play against African-American George Flippin. The schools were founding members of the WIUFA in 1892 and the MVIAA in 1907. The Missouri–Nebraska Bell (commonly referred to as the Victory Bell) has been awarded to the victor since 1927. The bell, stolen from a Seward church in 1892, was contested by University of Nebraska fraternities for decades before becoming a rivalry trophy.

Missouri defeated Nebraska on November 3, 1962, the first game of NU's NCAA-record sellout streak. Nebraska gradually took control of the series as it became a national power, but several Missouri upsets in the early years of Tom Osborne's tenure took the Cornhuskers out of national title contention. After a shocking 1978 Missouri win in Lincoln—which came one week after the Huskers upended No. 1 Oklahoma—Nebraska won 24 consecutive games over the Tigers, highlighted by the "Flea Kicker" in 1997. The series ended when Nebraska joined the Big Ten in 2011. Missouri, which pushed for Big Ten membership, joined the SEC the following year.

Nebraska leads the series 65–36–3 and holds the Victory Bell after its 2010 win in Lincoln. No future games are scheduled.

=== Oklahoma ===
Nebraska and Oklahoma first met on November 23, 1912, a 13–9 Cornhuskers win in Lincoln. Oklahoma joined the MVIAA in 1920 and the teams began an annual series when Nebraska rejoined in 1921. NU and OU regularly met on Thanksgiving weekend in their ninety years as conference rivals. The series has long been considered one of college football's great rivalries.

Nebraska opened Memorial Stadium in 1923 with a 24–0 win over Oklahoma and dominated the series until 1942, losing just three of the first twenty-two meetings. Bud Wilkinson established a dynasty at OU in the 1940s and 1950s, defeating Nebraska for sixteen straight seasons until a 1959 upset that also ended OU's seventy-four-game conference win streak. In Bob Devaney's second season, NU ended a thirty-two-year conference title drought by beating OU in the last week of the regular season. The first of eighteen top-ten matchups between Nebraska and Oklahoma was nearly canceled due to the assassination of John F. Kennedy the day prior. Wilkinson was a personal friend of Kennedy's and received permission from his brother Robert to play the game.

On November 25, 1971, the teams met in "The Game of the Century." Highlighted by a Johnny Rodgers punt return, top-ranked Nebraska beat No. 2 Oklahoma 35–31 in Norman. Sportswriter Dan Jenkins suggested postgame "it was the greatest collegiate football battle ever," a sentiment that has been maintained since. Tom Osborne took over as Nebraska's head coach in 1973, the same year Barry Switzer was promoted in Norman. Switzer controlled the rivalry through the 1970s, defeating Osborne in eight of their first nine matchups; he coined the term "Sooner Magic" to describe OU's uncanny success in these games. NU's victory over No. 1 OU late in the 1978 regular season was quickly avenged in the 1979 Orange Bowl. The rivals continued their Big Eight dominance in the 1980s until Switzer abruptly resigned from Oklahoma in 1989 in the wake of sweeping NCAA sanctions. Nebraska won seven consecutive matchups following Switzer's departure.

The rivals were placed in different divisions when the Big Eight and Southwest merged in 1996, meaning they would not play annually for the first time since 1927. NU or OU won at least a share of seventy-one out of eighty-nine MVIAA and Big Eight championships. Bob Stoops was hired at Oklahoma in 1999 and quickly revived the program – his Sooners beat top-ranked Nebraska in 2000 on the way to the national championship. The following year, the teams played the first regular-season No. 1 versus No. 2 game in BCS history. (Note: Oklahoma was ranked first and Nebraska second by the BCS, but both were ranked behind eventual national champion Miami in the AP and Coaches polls.) NU won 20–10 and a long touchdown pass to quarterback Eric Crouch ("Black 41 Flash Reverse") became the iconic moment of his Heisman Trophy-winning season. The schools met twice in the Big 12 Championship Game, both OU victories, before Nebraska departed the conference in 2010. Oklahoma joined the SEC in 2024.

Oklahoma leads the series 47–38–3. The teams will play next on September 15, 2029.

=== Wisconsin ===
Nebraska and Wisconsin first met on November 2, 1901, an 18–0 Badgers win in Milwaukee. The teams played just four other times before Nebraska joined the Big Ten in 2011. Wisconsin has won ten of twelve conference matchups, including a dominant upset of Nebraska in the 2012 Big Ten Championship Game. The Freedom Trophy has been awarded to the game's winner since 2014, the first year the Cornhuskers and Badgers were division rivals in the Big Ten West.

Wisconsin leads the series 13–5. Nebraska holds the Freedom Trophy after its 2024 win in Lincoln. The teams will play next in 2027.

== Honors and awards ==
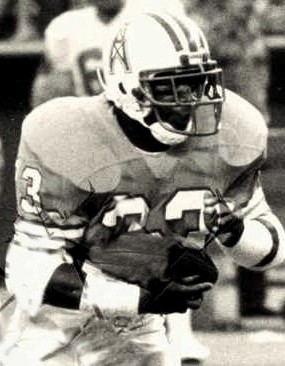
I-back Mike Rozier won the Heisman Trophy, Walter Camp Award, and Maxwell Award in 1983

=== Major award winners ===
- Heisman Trophy: Johnny Rodgers (1972), Mike Rozier (1983), Eric Crouch (2001)
- Bronko Nagurski Trophy: Ndamukong Suh (2009)
- Butkus Award: Trev Alberts (1993)
- Chuck Bednarik Award: Ndamukong Suh (2009)
- Davey O'Brien Award: Eric Crouch (2001)
- Johnny Unitas Golden Arm Award: Tommie Frazier (1995)
- Lombardi Award: Rich Glover (1972), Dave Rimington (1982), Dean Steinkuhler (1983), Grant Wistrom (1997), Ndamukong Suh (2009)
- Maxwell Award: Mike Rozier (1983)
- Outland Trophy: Larry Jacobson (1971), Rich Glover (1972), Dave Rimington (1981, 1982), Dean Steinkuhler (1983), Will Shields (1992), Zach Wiegert (1994), Aaron Taylor (1997), Ndamukong Suh (2009)
- Rimington Trophy: Dominic Raiola (2000)
- Walter Camp Award: Johnny Rodgers (1972), Mike Rozier (1983), Eric Crouch (2001)

=== College Football Hall of Fame ===
Twenty-seven Nebraska players and coaches have been inducted into the College Football Hall of Fame. Three Cornhuskers – tackle Ed Weir and head coaches Dana X. Bible and Fielding H. Yost – were members of the Hall's inaugural class in 1951. Bob Brown, Guy Chamberlin, and Will Shields are also enshrined in the Pro Football Hall of Fame.

=== Retired numbers and jerseys ===
Nebraska has permanently retired the number of two players: Tom Novak, the only four-time all-conference selection in Nebraska history; and Bob Brown, the first All-American coached by Bob Devaney. Novak's no. 60 and Brown's no. 64 have not been worn since being retired. (Note: Novak also wore no. 68 and no. 61 during his career, which are not retired. Brown's no. 64 was worn by many players prior to its retirement in 2004, most recently by offensive lineman Kurt Mann.)

Nebraska has retired the jersey of twenty-three other players, allowing the numbers to remain in circulation. The name and number of each honoree is displayed below the North Stadium press box at Memorial Stadium. Each major award winner has his jersey retired, typically in an on-field ceremony following the end of his collegiate career. In 2017, the school recognized eight early College Football Hall of Fame inductees, including Guy Chamberlin, whose career predated the use of numbers on jerseys.

| No. | Player | Position | Career | Retired (Note: The year the player's jersey or number was retired by the university.) |
Retired numbers
| 60 | Tom Novak | C | 1946–1949 | 1949 |
| 64 | Bob Brown | OT | 1961–1963 | 2004 |
Retired jerseys
| 1 | Clarence Swanson | E | 1918–1921 | 2017 |
| 7 | Eric Crouch | QB | 1998–2001 | 2002 |
| 12 | Bobby Reynolds | HB | 1950–1952 | 2017 |
| 15 | Tommie Frazier | QB | 1992–1995 | 1996 |
| 20 | Johnny Rodgers | WB | 1970–1972 | 1972 |
| 25 | George Sauer | FB | 1931–1933 | 2017 |
| 30 | Mike Rozier | IB | 1981–1983 | 1983 |
| 33 | Forrest Behm | OT | 1938–1940 | 2017 |
| 34 | Trev Alberts | LB | 1990–1993 | 1994 |
| 35 | Ed Weir | OT | 1923–1925 | 2017 |
| 38 | Sam Francis | FB | 1934–1936 | 2017 |
| 50 | Dave Rimington | C | 1979–1982 | 1982 |
| 54 | Dominic Raiola | C | 1998–2000 | 2002 |
| 66 | Wayne Meylan | MG | 1965–1967 | 2017 |
| 67 | Aaron Taylor | OG | 1994–1997 | 1998 |
| 71 | Dean Steinkuhler | OG | 1980–1983 | 1983 |
| 72 | Zach Wiegert | OT | 1991–1994 | 1995 |
| 75 | Larry Jacobson | DT | 1969–1971 | 1994 |
| 75 | Will Shields | OG | 1989–1992 | 1994 |
| 79 | Rich Glover | MG | 1970–1972 | 1972 |
| 93 | Ndamukong Suh | DT | 2005–2009 | 2010 |
| 98 | Grant Wistrom | DE | 1994–1997 | 1998 |
| | Guy Chamberlin | E | 1913–1915 | 2017 |

== In the NFL ==
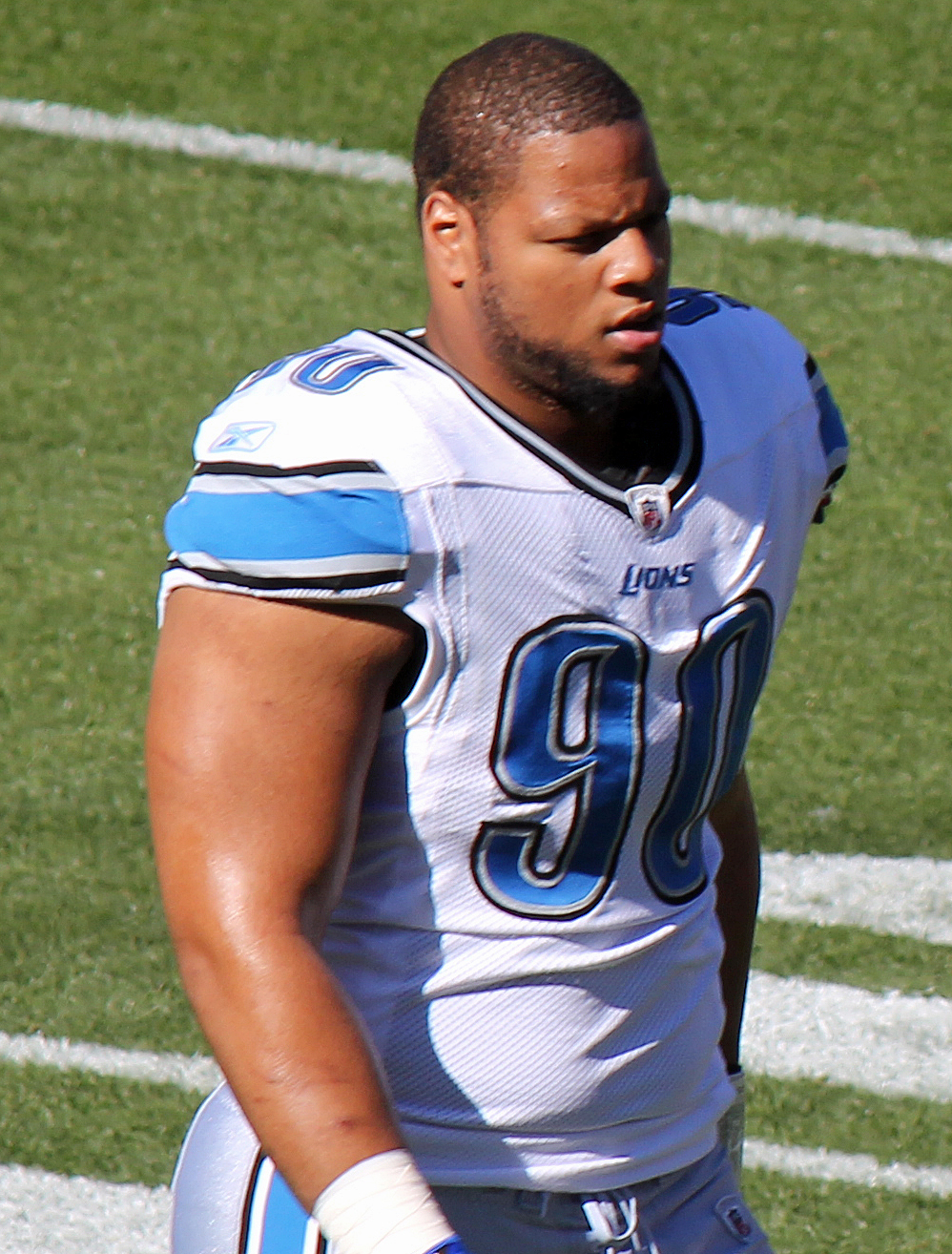
Ndamukong Suh was drafted second overall by the Detroit Lions in 2010

Nebraska has had 368 former players drafted into the National Football League, including thirty-four first-round picks, two players selected first overall (Sam Francis in 1937 and Irving Fryar in 1984), and one player selected with the last pick of the draft (Stan Hegener in 1971).

Guy Chamberlin, Nebraska's first consensus All-American, signed with the Decatur Staleys (now the Chicago Bears) in 1920 and a year later, scored the winning touchdown in the controversial "Staley Swindle" game. Chamberlin won four more APFA/NFL championships as a player and coach and has the highest win percentage of any coach in NFL history among those with at least fifty wins.

Former Nebraska I-back Roger Craig became the first player to score three touchdowns in a Super Bowl in Super Bowl XIX. The following season, he became the first player with 1,000 rushing yards and 1,000 receiving yards in a single NFL season, and in 1988 was named Offensive Player of the Year. Craig and fullback Tom Rathman, another former Cornhusker, played five seasons together on a high-powered San Francisco 49ers offense, winning two more Super Bowls.

Rams quarterback Vince Ferragamo became the only former Cornhusker to start at quarterback in a Super Bowl in Super Bowl XIV. Zac Taylor, another former Nebraska quarterback, was named head coach of the Cincinnati Bengals in 2019 and took the team to Super Bowl LVI in his third season. NU was represented by at least one player in each Super Bowl from 1993 until 2019, the longest active streak of any school at the time it was snapped. (Note: This includes Zaire Anderson as Nebraska's representative in Super Bowl 50, though Anderson was on Denver's practice squad when the game was played.)

=== Pro Football Hall of Fame ===
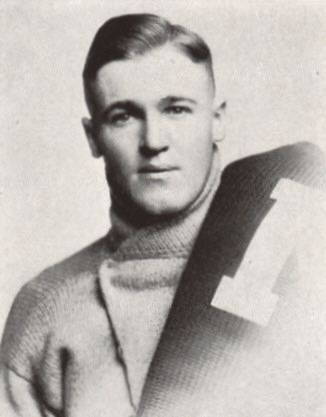
Guy Chamberlin was elected to the Pro Football Hall of Fame in 1965

| Name | Position | Tenure | Inducted |
|---|---|---|---|
| Link Lyman | OT | 1918–1919, 1921 | 1964 |
| Guy Chamberlin | E | 1913–1915 | 1965 |
| Bob Brown | OT | 1961–1963 | 2004 |
| Will Shields | OG | 1989–1992 | 2015 |
| Mick Tingelhoff | C | 1959–1961 | 2015 |
| Roger Craig | RB | 1979-1982 | 2026 |

=== Active players ===
There are eleven former Cornhuskers on NFL rosters, along with three coaches.

Players

- Ameer Abdullah – RB, JAC
- Maliek Collins – DL, CLE
- Thomas Fidone – TE, NYG
- Luke Gifford – LB, SF
- Cam Jurgens – OL, BAL
- Emmett Johnson – RB, KC
- Jordon Riley – DL, GB
- Ty Robinson – DL, PHI
- Wan'Dale Robinson – WR, TEN
- Isaiah Stalbird – LB, NO
- Cam Taylor-Britt – CB, IND

Coaches

- Daniel Bullocks – cornerbacks, GB
- Carlos Polk – asst. special teams, DAL
- Zac Taylor – head coach, CIN

== Future schedule ==
Nebraska annually faces one protected rival (Iowa) in the Big Ten's current scheduling format. The remaining eight conference games rotate through the Big Ten's sixteen other teams.

| Year | Non-conference opponents | Home conference opponents | Away conference opponents |
|---|---|---|---|
| 2026 | Ohio, Bowling Green, North Dakota | Indiana, Maryland, Ohio State, Washington | Illinois, Iowa, Michigan State, Oregon, Rutgers |
| 2027 | Northern Illinois, Miami (OH)(Arrowhead Stadium, Kansas City, Mo), Northern Iowa | Iowa, Minnesota, Oregon, Purdue, Rutgers | Northwestern, Ohio State, Washington, Wisconsin |
| 2028 | UTEP, South Dakota State, Arizona | Northwestern, Penn State, UCLA, Wisconsin | Iowa, Michigan, Minnesota, Purdue, USC |
| 2029 | Nevada, at Oklahoma | TBA | TBA |
| 2030 | South Dakota State, Oklahoma | TBA | TBA |
| 2031 | Miami (OH), at Arizona | TBA | TBA |
| 2032 | Notre Dame | TBA | TBA |
| 2033 | Cincinnati, at Notre Dame | TBA | TBA |
| 2034 | Oklahoma State | TBA | TBA |
| 2035 | at Oklahoma State | TBA | TBA |
