= 1916 SMU Mustangs football team =

American college football season

1916 SMU Mustangs football
- Conference: Texas Intercollegiate Athletic Association
- Record: 0–8–2 ( TIAA)
- Head coach: Ray Morrison (2nd season)
- Captain: B. C. Glenn
- Home stadium: State Fair grounds

The 1916 SMU Mustangs football team was an American football team that represented the Southern Methodist University (SMU) as a member of the Texas Intercollegiate Athletic Association (TIAA) during the 1916 college football season. In its second season under head coach Ray Morrison, the team compiled an overall record of 0–8–2 and was outscored by a total of 455 to 27.

== Schedule ==
| Date | Opponent | Site | Result | Source |
|---|---|---|---|---|
| September 30 | at Texas | Clark Field; Austin, TX | L 0–74 | |
| October 7 | at Baylor | Carroll Field; Waco, TX | L 0–61 | |
| October 18 | vs. TCU | State Fair grounds; Dallas, TX (rivalry) | L 3–48 | |
| October 23 | at Texas A&M | Kyle Field; College Station, TX | L 0–62 | |
| October 30 | Dallas | Armstrong Field; Dallas, TX | L 6–14 | |
| November 4 | Austin | Armstrong Field; Dallas, TX | T 0–0 | |
| November 11 | Daniel Baker | Armstrong Field; Dallas, TX | L 0–27 | |
| November 17 | at Rice | Rice Field; Houston, TX (rivalry) | L 3–146 | |
| November 24 | Trinity (TX) | Armstrong Field; Dallas, TX | L 6–14 | |
| December 1 | at Southwestern (TX) | Snyder Field; Georgetown, TX | T 9–9 | |
