= Tunnel Walk =

Team entrance at Nebraska Cornhuskers football games

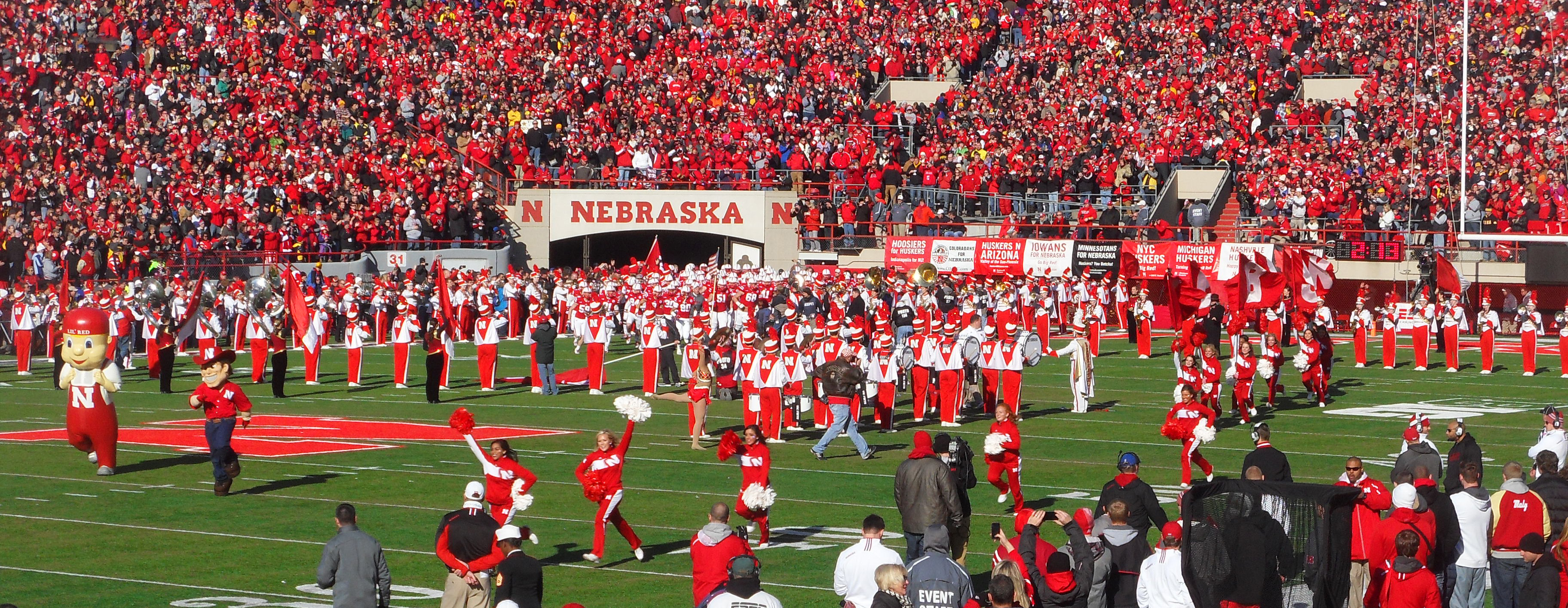
The Tunnel Walk on Nov. 29, 2013

The Tunnel Walk is the pregame entrance of the Nebraska Cornhuskers football team prior to its home games at Memorial Stadium in Lincoln, Nebraska. The tradition began in 1994 and typically features the Alan Parsons Project instrumental "Sirius."

== History ==
The Tunnel Walk debuted on September 17, 1994, prior to Nebraska's first home game following the installation of two large video boards (termed "HuskerVision") and a path constructed of commemorative bricks purchased by fans and donors. The team emerged from Memorial Stadium's southwest corner to the Alan Parsons Project instrumental "Sirius." Nebraska won its first thirty games after the establishment of the Tunnel Walk.

Nebraska hosted Rice on September 20, 2001, the first college football game played after the September 11 attacks, with soldiers, policemen, and firefighters walking out of the tunnel. It is the only time the Tunnel Walk did not feature a Nebraska coach or player leading the team; to commemorate the twentieth anniversary of the attacks, a group of first responders led by linebacker Damian Jackson, a former Navy SEAL, took the field during the Tunnel Walk. The team's entrance moved to the northwest corner of Memorial Stadium when the Osborne Athletic Complex was completed in 2006.

In 2014, Nebraska head coach Bo Pelini led the spring game Tunnel Walk while holding a cat, a recurring joke of the satirical Twitter account "FauxPelini." During the regular season months later, a pyrotechnics display during the Tunnel Walk led to several calls to the police. The school replaced "Sirius" during the 2018 spring game, but it was reinstated for the regular season.

The team's entrance moved to the northwest corner of Memorial Stadium when the Osborne Legacy Complex was completed in 2023. Players take the field under an arch reading "I Play for Nebraska," which was relocated to the new tunnel, as were the bricks laid down when the tradition was established in 1994.

== Composition ==
The video preceding the Tunnel Walk changes each year, but always begins with a flashing light as Sirius starts to play. In its early years, the entrance only featured a lights sequence, later expanding to use three-dimensional cartoon effects including flying Coaches' Trophies and laser beams. In the mid-2000s, live actors (including players and coaches) were used to portray military personnel and construction workers. Since Steve Pederson's firing as athletic director in 2007, videos typically feature highlights of past games and pump-up music, deemphasizing animated and scripted sequences.

The Tunnel Walk is preceded by a chant which has half the crowd yell "Husker" in unison and the other half respond with "Power."

== Other uses ==
"Sirius" was used as part of a pregame presentation for the Kansas City Chiefs throughout the 1980s, and was later made famous by the Chicago Bulls. Some Nebraska fans have suggested replacing "Sirius" during the Tunnel Walk to avoid comparisons to the Bulls, but its use remains generally popular among program supporters.

Nebraska uses a variation of the Tunnel Walk for several of its other sports, most notably volleyball. During Volleyball Day in Nebraska at Memorial Stadium, Nebraska head coach John Cook led the team onto the field, the final time the southwest tunnel was used for a Tunnel Walk.
