= 1916 Arkansas Razorbacks football team =

American college football season

1916 Arkansas Razorbacks football
- Conference: Southwest Conference
- Record: 4–4 (0–2 SWC)
- Head coach: T. T. McConnell (2nd season)
- Captain: Chris Reichardt
- Home stadium: The Hill

1916 Southwest Conference football standings
	Conf.					Overall
Team	W		L		T	W		L		T
Texas	5	–	1	–	0	7	–	2	–	0
Baylor	3	–	1	–	0	9	–	1	–	0
Rice	2	–	1	–	0	6	–	1	–	2
Oklahoma	2	–	1	–	0	6	–	5	–	0
Texas A&M	1	–	2	–	0	6	–	3	–	0
Arkansas	0	–	2	–	0	4	–	4	–	0
Oklahoma A&M	0	–	3	–	0	4	–	4	–	0
Southwestern (TX)	0	–	4	–	0	3	–	5	–	1
No champion recognized

The 1916 Arkansas Razorbacks football team represented the University of Arkansas in the Southwest Conference (SWC) during the 1916 college football season. In their second and final year under head coach T. T. McConnell, the Razorbacks compiled a 4–4 record (0–2 against SWC opponents), finished in sixth place in the SWC, and outscored their opponents by a combined total of 261 to 124.

== Schedule ==
Date	Opponent	Site	Result	Source
September 30	Pittsburg Normal*	The Hill; Fayetteville, AR	W 34–20	
October 7	Hendrix*	The Hill; Fayetteville, AR	W 58–0	
October 14	Oklahoma Mines*	The Hill; Fayetteville, AR	W 82–0	
October 21	Missouri Mines*	The Hill; Fayetteville, AR	W 60–0	
November 4	vs. LSU*	Fair Grounds; Shreveport, LA (rivalry)	L 7–17	
November 14	at Texas	Clark Field; Austin, TX (rivalry)	L 0–52	
November 25	vs. Oklahoma	Municipal Stadium; Fort Smith, AR	L 13–14	
November 30	vs. Mississippi A&M*	Russwood Park; Memphis, TN	L 7–20	
*Non-conference game
