= 1916 Rice Owls football team =

American college football season

1916 Rice Owls football
- Conference: Southwest Conference
- Record: 6–1–2 (2–1 SWC)
- Head coach: Philip Arbuckle (5th season)
- Captain: W. E. Brown
- Home stadium: Rice Field

1916 Southwest Conference football standings
	Conf.					Overall
Team	W		L		T	W		L		T
Texas	5	–	1	–	0	7	–	2	–	0
Baylor	3	–	1	–	0	9	–	1	–	0
Rice	2	–	1	–	0	6	–	1	–	2
Oklahoma	2	–	1	–	0	6	–	5	–	0
Texas A&M	1	–	2	–	0	6	–	3	–	0
Arkansas	0	–	2	–	0	4	–	4	–	0
Oklahoma A&M	0	–	3	–	0	4	–	4	–	0
Southwestern (TX)	0	–	4	–	0	3	–	5	–	1
No champion recognized

The 1916 Rice Owls football team was an American football team that represented Rice Institute as a member of the Southwest Conference (SWC) during the 1916 college football season. In its fifth season under head coach Philip Arbuckle, the team compiled a 6–1–2 record (2–1 against SWC opponents) and outscored opponents by a total of 346 to 62.

On November 17, 1916, the team scored 146 points against SMU. This remains the single-game scoring record for a Rice football team. Rice scored 23 touchdowns in the game, including six by left halfback Griffith Vance. The Houston Daily Post wrote that Vance's work was the "outstanding feature of the game", describing a "wonderful side step" and "quick change of pace" that enabled him to run through the entire SMU team several times for touchdowns.

== Schedule ==
Date	Opponent	Site	Result	Source
October 7	at Texas	Clark Field; Austin, TX (rivalry)	L 2–16	
October 13	Austin*	Rice Field; Houston, TX	W 40–0	
October 21	Southwestern (TX)	Rice Field; Houston, TX	W 54–0	
October 27	at TCU*	TCU gridiron; Fort Worth, TX	T 7–7	
November 4	Texas A&M	West End Park; Houston, TX	W 20–0	
November 11	Tulane*	Rice Field; Houston, TX	W 23–13	
November 17	SMU*	Rice Field; Houston, TX (rivalry)	W 146–3	
November 24	at LSU*	State Field; Baton Rouge, LA	T 7–7	
November 30	Arizona*	Rice Field; Houston, TX	W 47–16	
*Non-conference game
