= 1916 Iowa State Cyclones football team =

American college football season

1916 Iowa State Cyclones football
- Conference: Missouri Valley Conference
- Record: 5–2–1 (2–1–1 MVC)
- Head coach: Charles Mayser (2nd season)
- Captain: Dury Moss
- Home stadium: State Field

1916 Missouri Valley Conference football standings
	Conf.					Overall
Team	W		L		T	W		L		T
Nebraska $	3	–	1	–	0	6	–	2	–	0
Missouri	3	–	1	–	1	6	–	1	–	1
Iowa State	2	–	1	–	1	5	–	2	–	1
Kansas State	1	–	1	–	1	6	–	1	–	1
Kansas	1	–	2	–	1	4	–	3	–	1
Drake	1	–	3	–	0	3	–	5	–	0
Washington University	0	–	2	–	0	3	–	3	–	1
$ – Conference champion

The 1916 Iowa State Cyclones football team represented Iowa State College of Agricultural and Mechanic Arts (later renamed Iowa State University) in the Missouri Valley Conference during the 1916 college football season. In their second season under head coach Charles Mayser, the Cyclones compiled a 5–2–1 record (2–1–1 against conference opponents), finished in third place in the conference, shut out five of eight opponents, and outscored opponents by a combined total of 107 to 36. They played their home games at State Field in Ames, Iowa. Dury Moss was the team captain.

== Schedule ==
Date	Opponent	Site	Result	Attendance	Source
September 30	Iowa State Teachers*	State Field; Ames, IA	W 19–0		
October 7	Highland Park*	State Field; Ames, IA	W 19–0		
October 14	Kansas	State Field; Ames, IA	W 13–0	5,200	
October 21	at Missouri	Rollins Field; Columbia, MO (rivalry)	T 0–0		
November 4	at Nebraska	Nebraska Field; Lincoln, NE (rivalry)	L 0–3		
November 11	at Morningside*	Sioux City, IA	W 7–0		
November 18	Iowa*^{†}	State Field; Ames, IA (rivalry)	L 16–19		
November 30	Drake	State Field; Ames, IA	W 32–14		
*Non-conference game; ^{†}Homecoming
