= 1916 Nebraska Cornhuskers football team =

American college football season

1916 Nebraska Cornhuskers football

MVC champion
- Conference: Missouri Valley Conference
- Record: 6–2 (3–1 MVC)
- Head coach: E. J. Stewart (1st season)
- Home stadium: Nebraska Field

1916 Missouri Valley Conference football standings
	Conf.					Overall
Team	W		L		T	W		L		T
Nebraska $	3	–	1	–	0	6	–	2	–	0
Missouri	3	–	1	–	1	6	–	1	–	1
Iowa State	2	–	1	–	1	5	–	2	–	1
Kansas State	1	–	1	–	1	6	–	1	–	1
Kansas	1	–	2	–	1	4	–	3	–	1
Drake	1	–	3	–	0	3	–	5	–	0
Washington University	0	–	2	–	0	3	–	3	–	1
$ – Conference champion

The 1916 Nebraska Cornhuskers football team represented the University of Nebraska in the 1916 college football season. The team was coached by first-year head coach E. J. Stewart and played its home games at Nebraska Field in Lincoln, Nebraska. They competed as members of the Missouri Valley Conference. Nebraska's loss to Kansas in November ended NU's 34-game unbeaten streak. Stewart, hired to replace the outgoing Ewald O. Stiehm, also served as Nebraska's basketball coach and athletic director.

== Schedule ==
Date	Time	Opponent	Site	Result	Attendance	Source
October 7	2:30 p.m.	Drake	Nebraska Field; Lincoln, NE	W 53–0		
October 14	2:30 p.m.	Kansas State	Nebraska Field; Lincoln, NE (rivalry)	W 14–0		
October 21	4:30 p.m.	at Oregon Agricultural*	Multnomah Field; Portland, OR	W 17–7		
October 28	2:30 p.m.	Nebraska Wesleyan*	Nebraska Field; Lincoln, NE	W 21–0		
November 4	2:30 p.m.	Iowa State	Nebraska Field; Lincoln, NE (rivalry)	W 3–0		
November 18	2:30 p.m.	Kansas^{†}	Nebraska Field; Lincoln, NE (rivalry)	L 3–7	6,000	
November 25	2:00 p.m.	at Iowa*	Iowa Field; Iowa City, IA (rivalry)	W 34–17		
November 30	2:30 p.m.	Notre Dame*	Nebraska Field; Lincoln, NE (rivalry)	L 0–20		
*Non-conference game; ^{†}Homecoming

== Coaching staff ==
Coach	Position	First year	Alma mater
E. J. Stewart	Head coach	1916	Mount Union
Richard Rutherford	Assistant coach	1916	Nebraska
Vic Halligan	Assistant coach	1916	Nebraska
Jack Best	Trainer	1890	Nebraska

== Roster ==
Caley, Loren E
Cameron, Robert RT
Cook, John QB
Corey, Tim T
Dale, Ben G
Dobson, Paul HB
Doyle, Raymond FB
Gardiner, Jimmy HB
Kositsky, Ed T
Moser, Ellsworth C
Norris, William T
Otopalik, Hugo HB
Rhodes, Roscoe E
Riddell, Ted E
Selzer, Milton HB
Shaw, Edson T
Wilder, Harold T

== Game summaries ==
=== Drake ===
Drake at Nebraska

Team	1	2	Total
Drake			0
• Nebraska			53

- Date: October 7
- Location: Nebraska Field, Lincoln, NE
- Game start: 2:30 p.m.

=== Kansas State ===
Kansas State at Nebraska

Team	1	2	Total
Kansas State			0
• Nebraska			14

- Date: October 14
- Location: Nebraska Field, Lincoln, NE
- Game start: 2:30 p.m.

=== At Oregon Agricultural ===
Nebraska at Oregon State

Team	1	2	Total
• Nebraska			17
Oregon Agricultural			7

- Date: October 21
- Location: Multnomah Field, Portland, OR
- Game start: 4:30 p.m.

Nebraska traveled by train through Seattle and Spokane, making frequent publicity stops on the way to Portland to face head coach E. J. Stewart's former team. The university's annual yearbook predicted this would be the last time Nebraska's football team traveled so far from home. The Cornhuskers' 17–7 win gave the program its first West-Coast victory.

=== Nebraska Wesleyan ===
Nebraska Wesleyan at Nebraska

Team	1	2	Total
Nebraska Wesleyan			0
• Nebraska			21

- Date: October 28
- Location: Nebraska Field, Lincoln, NE
- Game start: 2:30 p.m.

=== Iowa State ===
Iowa State at Nebraska

Team	1	2	Total
Iowa State			0
• Nebraska			3

- Date: November 4
- Location: Nebraska Field, Lincoln, NE
- Game start: 2:30 p.m.

=== Kansas ===
Kansas at Nebraska

Team	1	2	3	4	Total
• Kansas	0	0	7	0	7
Nebraska	0	3	0	0	3

- Date: November 18
- Location: Nebraska Field, Lincoln, NE
- Game start: 2:30 p.m.

The Jayhawks held Nebraska to just a second-quarter field goal and used a series of big plays in the third to end Nebraska's 34-game unbeaten streak and 39-game home unbeaten streak. It was Nebraska's second loss in eight seasons at Nebraska Field, both to Kansas.

=== At Iowa ===
Nebraska at Iowa

Team	1	2	Total
• Nebraska			34
Iowa			17

- Date: November 25
- Location: Iowa Field, Iowa City, IA
- Game start: 2:00 p.m.

=== Notre Dame ===
Notre Dame at Nebraska

Team	1	2	Total
• Notre Dame			20
Nebraska			0

- Date: November 30
- Location: Nebraska Field, Lincoln, NE
- Game start: 2:30 p.m.

Notre Dame's 20–0 defeat of Nebraska was the first time NU had been shutout in five seasons. The Irish were led by assistant Knute Rockne, as head coach Jesse Harper could not attend due to an annual coach's meeting in Chicago.
