= 1916 Oklahoma Sooners football team =

American college football season

1916 Oklahoma Sooners football
- Conference: Southwest Conference
- Record: 6–5 (2–1 SWC)
- Head coach: Bennie Owen (12th season)
- Captain: Homer Montgomery
- Home stadium: Boyd Field

1916 Southwest Conference football standings
	Conf.					Overall
Team	W		L		T	W		L		T
Texas	5	–	1	–	0	7	–	2	–	0
Baylor	3	–	1	–	0	9	–	1	–	0
Rice	2	–	1	–	0	6	–	1	–	2
Oklahoma	2	–	1	–	0	6	–	5	–	0
Texas A&M	1	–	2	–	0	6	–	3	–	0
Arkansas	0	–	2	–	0	4	–	4	–	0
Oklahoma A&M	0	–	3	–	0	4	–	4	–	0
Southwestern (TX)	0	–	4	–	0	3	–	5	–	1
No champion recognized

The 1916 Oklahoma Sooners football team represented the University of Oklahoma in the 1916 college football season. In their 12th year under head coach Bennie Owen, the Sooners compiled a 6–5 record (2–1 against conference opponents), and outscored their opponents by a combined total of 472 to 115.

No Sooners were recognized as All-Americans.

One Sooner received All-Southwest Conference honors: Willis Hott.

== Schedule ==
Date	Opponent	Site	Result	Attendance	Source
September 23	vs. Central State Normal*	Fair Park; Oklahoma City, OK	W 27–0		
September 30	Oklahoma Catholic*	Boyd Field; Norman, OK	W 107–0		
October 7	Southwestern Normal*	Boyd Field; Norman, OK	W 140–0		
October 14	Kendall*	Boyd Field; Norman, OK	L 0–16		
October 21	Texas	Fair Park Stadium; Dallas, TX (rivalry)	L 7–21		
October 28	Missouri*	Boyd Field; Norman, OK (rivalry)	L 14–23		
November 4	at Kansas*	McCook Field; Lawrence, KS	L 13–21		
November 11	Kingfisher*	Boyd Field; Norman, OK	W 96–0		
November 18	Kansas State*	Boyd Field; Norman, OK	L 13–14		
November 25	vs. Arkansas	Municipal Stadium; Fort Smith, AR	W 14–13		
November 30	vs. Oklahoma A&M	Fair Park; Oklahoma City, OK (rivalry)	W 41–7	7,500	
*Non-conference game
