= 1916 Southwestern Pirates football team =

American college football season

1916 Southwestern Pirates football
- Conference: Southwest Conference
- Record: 3–5–1 (0–4 SWC)
- Head coach: J. Burton Rix (3rd season)
- Captain: Marvin Marsh
- Home stadium: Snyder Field

1916 Southwest Conference football standings
	Conf.					Overall
Team	W		L		T	W		L		T
Texas	5	–	1	–	0	7	–	2	–	0
Baylor	3	–	1	–	0	9	–	1	–	0
Rice	2	–	1	–	0	6	–	1	–	2
Oklahoma	2	–	1	–	0	6	–	5	–	0
Texas A&M	1	–	2	–	0	6	–	3	–	0
Arkansas	0	–	2	–	0	4	–	4	–	0
Oklahoma A&M	0	–	3	–	0	4	–	4	–	0
Southwestern (TX)	0	–	4	–	0	3	–	5	–	1
No champion recognized

The 1916 Southwestern Pirates football team represented Southwestern University as a member of the Southwest Conference (SWC) during the 1916 college football season. Led third-year head coach J. Burton Rix, Southwestern compiled an overall record of 3–5–1 with a mark of 0–4 in SWC play.

== Schedule ==
Date	Opponent	Site	Result	Source
September 29	Howard Payne*	Snyder Field; Georgetown, TX	W 9–0	
October 6	at Texas A&M	Kyle Field; College Station, TX	L 0–6	
October 13	Daniel Baker*	Snyder Field; Georgetown, TX	L 0–7	
October 21	at Rice	Rice Field; Houston, TX	L 0–54	
October 27	Austin*	Snyder Field; Georgetown, TX	W 20–7	
November 4	at Baylor	Cotton Palace; Waco, TX	L 0–20	
November 10	TCU*	Snyder Field; Georgetown, TX	W 41–13	
November 21	at Texas	Clark Field; Austin, TX	L 3–17	
December 1	SMU*	Snyder Field; Georgetown, TX	T 9–9	
*Non-conference game
