= 1916 Kansas State Farmers football team =

American college football season

1916 Kansas State Farmers football
- Conference: Missouri Valley Conference
- Record: 6–1–1 (1–1–1 MVC)
- Head coach: Zora Clevenger (1st season)
- Home stadium: Ahearn Field

1916 Missouri Valley Conference football standings
	Conf.					Overall
Team	W		L		T	W		L		T
Nebraska $	3	–	1	–	0	6	–	2	–	0
Missouri	3	–	1	–	1	6	–	1	–	1
Iowa State	2	–	1	–	1	5	–	2	–	1
Kansas State	1	–	1	–	1	6	–	1	–	1
Kansas	1	–	2	–	1	4	–	3	–	1
Drake	1	–	3	–	0	3	–	5	–	0
Washington University	0	–	2	–	0	3	–	3	–	1
$ – Conference champion

The 1916 Kansas State Farmers football team represented Kansas State Agricultural College—now known as Kansas State University—as a member of the Missouri Valley Conference (MVC) during the 1916 college football season. Led by first-year head coach Zora Clevenger, the Farmers compiled an overall record of 6–1–1 with a mark of 1–1–1 in conference play, placing fourth in the MVC.

== Schedule ==
Date	Opponent	Site	Result	Source
September 30	Baker*	Ahearn Field; Manhattan, KS	W 20–0	
October 6	Southwestern (KS)*	Ahearn Field; Manhattan, KS	W 53–0	
October 14	at Nebraska	Nebraska Field; Lincoln, NE (rivalry)	L 0–14	
October 21	Kansas State Normal*	Ahearn Field; Manhattan, KS	W 13–3	
October 28	at Kansas	McCook Field; Lawrence, KS (rivalry)	T 0–0	
November 11	Missouri^{†}	Ahearn Field; Manhattan, KS	W 7–6	
November 17	at Oklahoma*	Boyd Field; Norman, OK	W 14–13	
November 23	Washburn*	Ahearn Field; Manhattan, KS	W 47–0	
*Non-conference game; ^{†}Homecoming
