= 1916 Texas A&M Aggies football team =

American college football season

1916 Texas A&M Aggies football
- Conference: Southwest Conference
- Record: 6–3 (1–2 SWC)
- Head coach: Edwin Harlan (2nd season)
- Home stadium: Kyle Field

1916 Southwest Conference football standings
	Conf.					Overall
Team	W		L		T	W		L		T
Texas	5	–	1	–	0	7	–	2	–	0
Baylor	3	–	1	–	0	9	–	1	–	0
Rice	2	–	1	–	0	6	–	1	–	2
Oklahoma	2	–	1	–	0	6	–	5	–	0
Texas A&M	1	–	2	–	0	6	–	3	–	0
Arkansas	0	–	2	–	0	4	–	4	–	0
Oklahoma A&M	0	–	3	–	0	4	–	4	–	0
Southwestern (TX)	0	–	4	–	0	3	–	5	–	1
No champion recognized

The 1916 Texas A&M Aggies football team represented the Agricultural and Mechanical College of Texas (now known as Texas A&M University) as a member of the Southwest Conference (SWC) during the 1916 college football season. Led by second-year head coach Edwin Harlan, the Aggies compiled an overall record of 6–3, with a mark of 1–2 in conference play. Texas A&M played home games at Kyle Field in College Station, Texas.

== Schedule ==
Date	Opponent	Site	Result	Source
October 6	Southwestern (TX)	Kyle Field; College Station, TX	W 6–0	
October 14	vs. LSU*	Galveston, TX (rivalry)	L 0–13	
October 23	SMU*	Kyle Field; College Station, TX	W 62–0	
October 28	vs. Haskell*	Fair Park Athletic Field; Dallas, TX	W 13–6	
November 4	at Rice	West End Park; Houston, TX	L 0–20	
November 11	at Baylor	Cotton Palace; Waco, TX (rivalry)	W 3–0	
November 17	Missouri Mines*	Kyle Field; College Station, TX	W 77–0	
November 23	Dallas*	Kyle Field; College Station, TX	W 20–6	
November 30	at Texas	Clark Field; Austin, TX (rivalry)	L 7–21	
*Non-conference game
