= 1916 Texas Longhorns football team =

American college football season

1916 Texas Longhorns football
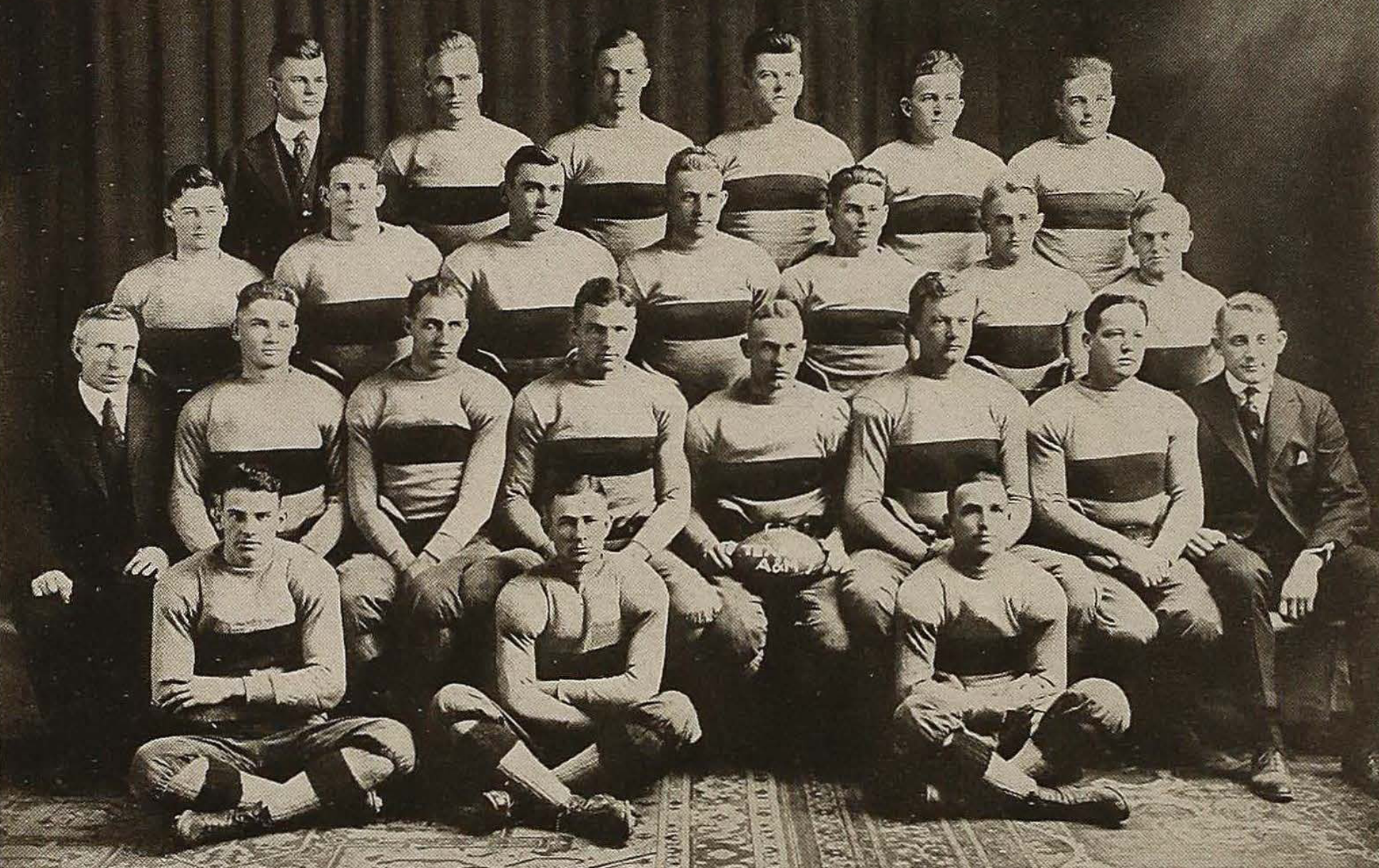

SWC champion
- Conference: Southwest Conference
- Record: 7–2 (6–1 SWC)
- Head coach: Eugene Van Gent (1st season)
- Captain: Pig Dittmar
- Home stadium: Clark Field

1916 Southwest Conference football standings
	Conf.					Overall
Team	W		L		T	W		L		T
Texas	5	–	1	–	0	7	–	2	–	0
Baylor	3	–	1	–	0	9	–	1	–	0
Rice	2	–	1	–	0	6	–	1	–	2
Oklahoma	2	–	1	–	0	6	–	5	–	0
Texas A&M	1	–	2	–	0	6	–	3	–	0
Arkansas	0	–	2	–	0	4	–	4	–	0
Oklahoma A&M	0	–	3	–	0	4	–	4	–	0
Southwestern (TX)	0	–	4	–	0	3	–	5	–	1
No champion recognized

The 1916 Texas Longhorns football team was an American football team that represented the University of Texas (now known as the University of Texas at Austin) as a member of the Southwest Conference (SWC) during the 1916 college football season. In their first year under head coach Eugene Van Gent, the team compiled an overall record of 7–2, and 6–1 in the SWC. During the A&M game the first Bevo was unveiled.

== Schedule ==
Date	Opponent	Site	Result	Attendance	Source
September 30	SMU*	Clark Field; Austin, TX	W 74–0	2,400	
October 7	Rice	Clark Field; Austin, TX (rivalry)	W 16–2		
October 13	vs. Oklahoma A&M	League Park; San Antonio, TX	W 14–6	5,000	
October 21	vs. Oklahoma	Fair Park Stadium; Dallas, TX (rivalry)	W 21–7		
October 28	Baylor	Clark Field; Austin, TX (rivalry)	L 3–7		
November 4	at Missouri*	Rollins Field; Columbia, MO	L 0–3		
November 14	Arkansas	Clark Field; Austin, TX (rivalry)	W 52–0		
November 21	Southwestern (TX)	Clark Field; Austin, TX	W 17–3		
November 30	Texas A&M	Clark Field; Austin, TX (rivalry)	W 21–7	15,000	
*Non-conference game
