= 1916 Missouri Tigers football team =

American college football season

1916 Missouri Tigers football
- Conference: Missouri Valley Conference
- Record: 6–1–1 (3–1–1 MVC)
- Head coach: Henry Schulte (3rd season)
- Captain: Harry S. Lansing
- Home stadium: Rollins Field

1916 Missouri Valley Conference football standings
	Conf.					Overall
Team	W		L		T	W		L		T
Nebraska $	3	–	1	–	0	6	–	2	–	0
Missouri	3	–	1	–	1	6	–	1	–	1
Iowa State	2	–	1	–	1	5	–	2	–	1
Kansas State	1	–	1	–	1	6	–	1	–	1
Kansas	1	–	2	–	1	4	–	3	–	1
Drake	1	–	3	–	0	3	–	5	–	0
Washington University	0	–	2	–	0	3	–	3	–	1
$ – Conference champion

The 1916 Missouri Tigers football team was an American football team that represented the University of Missouri in the Missouri Valley Conference (MVC) during the 1916 college football season. The team compiled a 6–1–1 record (3–1–1 against MVC opponents), finished in second place in the conference, and was outscored by all opponents by a combined total of 112 to 21. Henry Schulte was the head coach for the third of four seasons. The team played its home games at Rollins Field in Columbia, Missouri.

== Schedule ==
Date	Time	Opponent	Site	Result	Attendance	Source
October 7		Central (MO)*	Rollins Field; Columbia, MO	W 40–0		
October 14	3:00 p.m.	Washington University	Rollins Field; Columbia, MO	W 13–0		
October 21		Iowa State	Rollins Field; Columbia, MO (rivalry)	T 0–0		
October 28		at Oklahoma*	Boyd Field; Norman, OK (rivalry)	W 23–14		
November 4		Texas*	Rollins Field; Columbia, MO	W 3–0		
November 11		at Kansas State	Ahearn Field; Manhattan, KS	L 6–7		
November 18		Drake	Rollins Field; Columbia, MO	W 14–0		
November 30		at Kansas	McCook Field; Lawrence, KS (rivalry)	W 13–0	12,000	
*Non-conference game
