= 1916 TCU Horned Frogs football team =

American college football season

1916 TCU Horned Frogs football
- Conference: Texas Intercollegiate Athletic Association
- Record: 6–2–1 (3–0 TIAA)
- Head coach: Milton Daniel (1st season)
- Captain: John Nelson
- Home stadium: TCU gridiron

The 1916 TCU Horned Frogs football team represented Texas Christian University (TCU) as a member of the Texas Intercollegiate Athletic Association (TIAA) during the 1916 college football season. Led by Milton Daniel in his first year as head coach, the Horned Frogs compiled an overall record of 6–2–1. The team's captain was John Nelson, who played quarterback.

== Schedule ==
Date	Opponent	Site	Result	Attendance	Source
September 30	at Meridian College*	Meridian, TX	W 7–0		
October 7	Austin	TCU gridiron; Fort Worth, TX	W 28–2		
October 18	vs. SMU*	State Fair grounds; Dallas, TX (rivalry)	W 48–3		
October 27	Rice*	TCU gridiron; Fort Worth, TX	T 7–7		
November 6	Trinity (TX)*	TCU gridiron; Fort Worth, TX	W 35–0		
November 10	at Southwestern (TX)*	Snyder Field; Georgetown, TX	L 13–41		
November 18	at Daniel Baker	Brownwood, TX	W 23–0		
November 20	at Howard Payne	Brownwood, TX	W 42–0		
November 30	Baylor*	Fort Worth, TX (rivalry)	L 14–32	4,500	
*Non-conference game
