= 1916 Kansas Jayhawks football team =

American college football season

1916 Kansas Jayhawks football
- Conference: Missouri Valley Intercollegiate Athletic Association
- Record: 4–3–1 (1–2–1 MVIAA)
- Head coach: Herman Olcott (2nd season)
- Captain: Adrian Lindsey
- Home stadium: McCook Field

1916 Missouri Valley Conference football standings
	Conf.					Overall
Team	W		L		T	W		L		T
Nebraska $	3	–	1	–	0	6	–	2	–	0
Missouri	3	–	1	–	1	6	–	1	–	1
Iowa State	2	–	1	–	1	5	–	2	–	1
Kansas State	1	–	1	–	1	6	–	1	–	1
Kansas	1	–	2	–	1	4	–	3	–	1
Drake	1	–	3	–	0	3	–	5	–	0
Washington University	0	–	2	–	0	3	–	3	–	1
$ – Conference champion

The 1916 Kansas Jayhawks football team was an American football team that represented the University of Kansas as a member of the Missouri Valley Conference during the 1916 college football season. In their second season under head coach Herman Olcott, the Jayhawks compiled a 4–3–1 record (1–2–1 against conference opponents), finished in fifth place in the MVIAA, and were outscored by a total of 72 to 68. The team's November 18 victory over Nebraska snapped a 34-game unbeaten streak for the Cornhuskers. The Jayhawks played their home games at McCook Field in Lawrence, Kansas. Adrian Lindsey was the team captain.

== Schedule ==
Date	Opponent	Site	Result	Attendance	Source
September 30	Kansas State Normal*	McCook Field; Lawrence, KS	W 13–0		
October 7	at Illinois*	Illinois Field; Champaign, IL	L 0–30	3,788	
October 14	at Iowa State	State Field; Ames, IA	L 0–13	5,200	
October 28	Kansas State	McCook Field; Lawrence, KS (rivalry)	T 0–0		
November 4	Oklahoma*	McCook Field; Lawrence, KS	W 21–13		
November 11	at Washburn*	Topeka, KS	W 27–0		
November 18	at Nebraska	Nebraska Field; Lincoln, NE (rivalry)	W 7–3	6,000	
November 30	Missouri^{†}	McCook Field; Lawrence, KS (rivalry)	L 0–13	12,000	
*Non-conference game; ^{†}Homecoming
