= 1916 Oklahoma A&M Aggies football team =

American college football season

1916 Oklahoma A&M Aggies football
- Conference: Southwest Conference
- Record: 4–4 (0–3 SWC)
- Head coach: John G. Griffith (2nd season)
- Home stadium: Lewis Field

1916 Southwest Conference football standings
	Conf.					Overall
Team	W		L		T	W		L		T
Texas	5	–	1	–	0	7	–	2	–	0
Baylor	3	–	1	–	0	9	–	1	–	0
Rice	2	–	1	–	0	6	–	1	–	2
Oklahoma	2	–	1	–	0	6	–	5	–	0
Texas A&M	1	–	2	–	0	6	–	3	–	0
Arkansas	0	–	2	–	0	4	–	4	–	0
Oklahoma A&M	0	–	3	–	0	4	–	4	–	0
Southwestern (TX)	0	–	4	–	0	3	–	5	–	1
No champion recognized

The 1916 Oklahoma A&M Aggies football team represented Oklahoma A&M College in the 1916 college football season. This was the 16th year of football at A&M and the second under John G. Griffith. The Aggies played their home games at Lewis Field in Stillwater, Oklahoma. They finished the season 4–4, 0–3 in the Southwest Conference.

== Schedule ==
Date	Opponent	Site	Result	Attendance	Source
October 7	Northwestern Territorial Normal*	Lewis Field; Stillwater, OK	W 90–0		
October 13	vs. Texas	League Park; San Antonio, TX	L 7–14	5,000	
October 21	Southwestern Normal*	Lewis Field; Stillwater, OK	W 117–0		
October 28	Warrensburg*	Lewis Field; Stillwater, OK	W 16–7		
November 4	at Kendall*	Association Park; Tulsa, OK (rivalry)	L 13–17	3,000	
November 11	Central State Normal*	Lewis Field; Stillwater, OK	W 34–6		
November 18	Baylor	Lewis Field; Stillwater, OK	L 7–10		
November 30	vs. Oklahoma	Fair Park; Oklahoma City, OK (rivalry)	L 7–41	7,500	
*Non-conference game
