= Charles Mosley (coach) =

American athlete and coach (1888–1968)

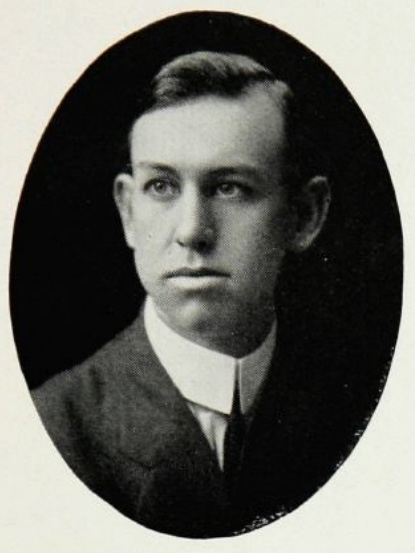
- Mosley pictured in The Round-Up 1915, Baylor yearbook

Biographical details
- Born: March 24, 1888; Sulphur Springs, Texas, U.S.
- Died: August 25, 1968 (aged 80); Tyler, Texas, U.S.

Playing career

Football
- 1909–1912: Baylor

Basketball
- 1910–1913: Baylor

Baseball
- 1909–1913: Baylor
- 1911: Corpus Christi Pelicans
- 1913: Dallas Giants
- 1914–1915: Fort Smith Twins
- 1916: Terrell Terrors
- 1917: Ennis Tigers
- 1920: Oklahoma City Indians
- 1920: Pawhuska Huskers
- Position: First baseman (baseball)

Coaching career (HC unless noted)

Football
- 1914–1919: Baylor
- 1924–1925: Wichita Falls JC
- 1931: Allen Academy (TX) (assistant)
- 1942: Jacksonville HS (TX)

Basketball
- 1914–1920: Baylor

Baseball
- 1914–1919: Baylor
- 1915: Fort Smith Twins

Head coaching record
- Overall: 30–18–4 (college football); 28–65 (college basketball); 47–60 (college baseball); 4–8–2 (junior college football)

Accomplishments and honors

Championships
- Football; 1 SWC (1915)

Charles Philip "Bubs" Mosley (March 24, 1888 – August 25, 1968) was an American football, basketball, and baseball player and coach, sports administrator, and educator. He served as the head football coach at Baylor University from 1914 to 1919 and Wichita Falls Junior College—now Midwestern State University—from 1924 to 1925. Mosley was also the head basketball coach at Baylor from 1914 to 1920, tallying a mark of 28–65, and the school's head baseball coach from 1914 to 1919, amassing a record of 47–60.

As the head football coach at Baylor, Mosley compiled a 30–18–4 (.615) record in six seasons. His 1916 team ranked as one of the best in school history. The Bears finished the season 9–1, with wins over Texas, and Oklahoma A&M. The team's only loss that season was by three points to Texas A&M. The Bears outscored opponents 315–27 during the season, winning seven of the games by 15 points or more.

In 1915, Mosley managed Fort Smith Twins of the Western Association. He resigned in early August and was succeeded by Ted Schultz. In 1931, Mosley was hired as an assistant coach at Allen Academy in Bryan, Texas under head coach Puny Wilson. He also coached at Rusk College in Rusk, Texas and was president of the East Texas Baseball League for three years. In 1941, Mosely joined the faculty at Jacksonville High School in Jacksonville, Texas. The following year, he was appointed as physical education director and head coach of all sports at the school.

A native of Sulphur Springs, Texas, he died on August 25, 1968, at a hospital in Tyler, Texas, after a long illness.

== Head coaching record ==
=== College football ===
Year	Team	Overall	Conference	Standing	Bowl/playoffs
Baylor Bears (Texas Intercollegiate Athletic Association) (1914)
1914	Baylor	3–5–2			
Baylor Bears (Southwest Conference) (1915–1919)
1915	Baylor	7–1	3–0	T–1st	
1916	Baylor	9–1	3–1	2nd	
1917	Baylor	6–2–1	2–1	2nd	
1918	Baylor	0–6	0–2	T–7th	
1919	Baylor	5–3–1	0–3–1	7th	
Baylor:		30–18–4			
Total:		30–18–4			

=== Junior college football ===
Year	Team	Overall	Conference	Standing	Bowl/playoffs
Wichita Falls Junior College (Independent) (1924–1925)
1924	Wichita Falls Junior College	1–4			
1925	Wichita Falls Junior College	3–4–2			
Wichita Falls Junior College:		4–8–2			
Total:		4–8–2			
