= Clark Field (1887) =

Defunct stadium in Texas, US

- Clark Field I
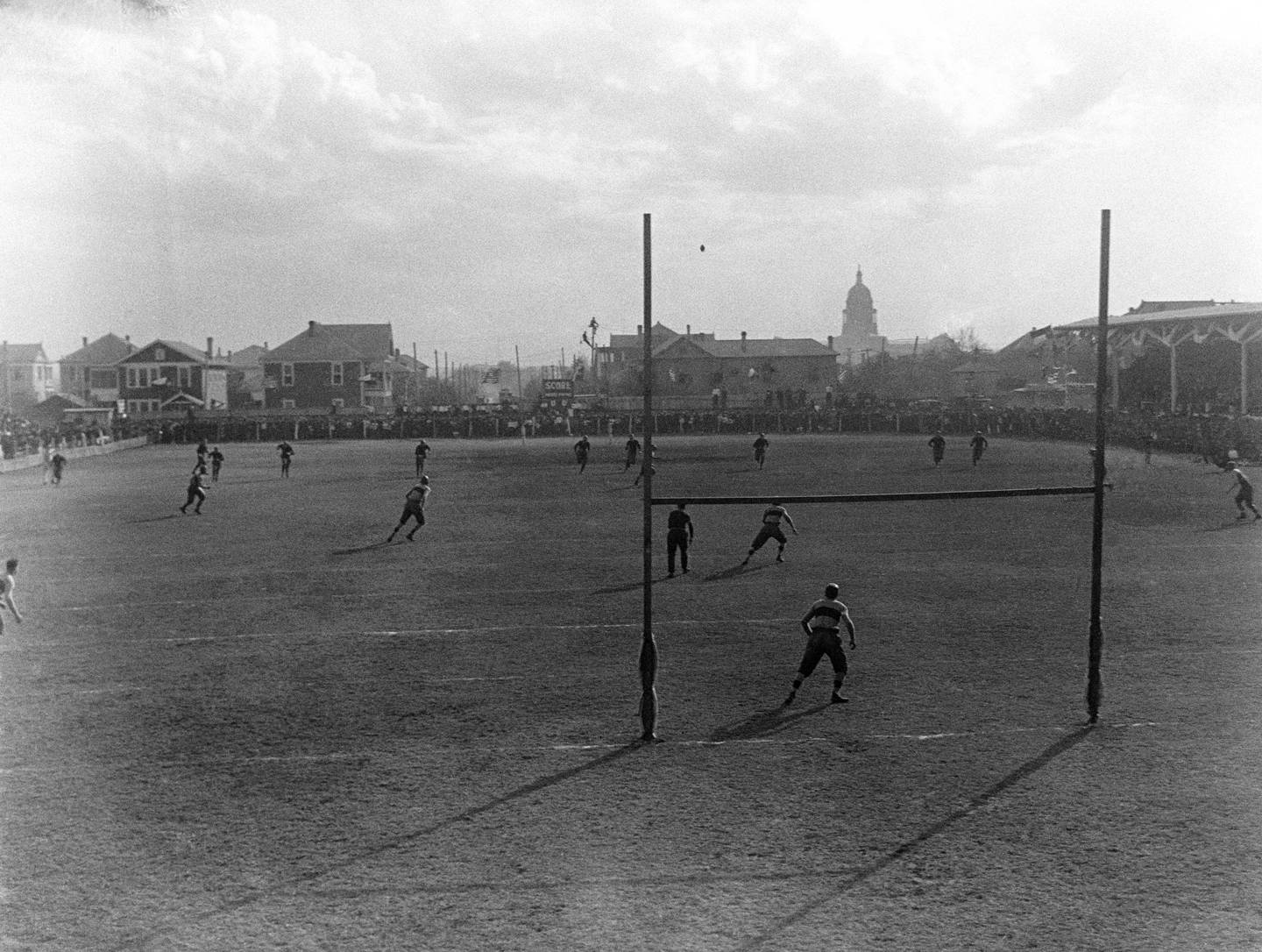
- Interactive map of Clark Field
- Former names: Varsity Athletic Field (1887–1904)
- Location: Austin, Texas
- Coordinates: 30°17′14″N 97°44′13″W
- Owner: University of Texas at Austin
- Operator: University of Texas at Austin
- Capacity: 20,000

Construction
- Opened: 1887
- Closed: 1928

Tenants
- Texas Longhorns football (1896–1924); Texas Longhorns baseball (1894–1927); Texas Longhorns men's basketball (1905–1917)

Clark Field, originally known as Varsity Athletic Field, was a stadium on the campus of the University of Texas at Austin. Clark Field hosted the Texas Longhorns football and track teams until they moved to the newly constructed Memorial Stadium in 1924. It also hosted the Texas baseball team until it moved to the second Clark Field in 1928 and the Texas Longhorns men's basketball team until it moved next door to the new Men's Gym in 1917.

The stadium opened in 1887 on part of the land at the southeast corner of 24th Street and Speedway At its peak of activity, the facility's wooden bleachers held 20,000 spectators. In 1904 it was named after former University of Texas regent, James Benjamin Clark.

In 1923, UT athletics director L. Theo Bellmont secured approval from the university's board of regents for construction of a permanent concrete stadium as a dual-purpose facility for the Texas football and track teams. Memorial Stadium, completed the following year, was built a short distance to the southeast of Clark Field. Following the 1927 baseball season, the university decided to develop the land and construct the Engineering Building, Taylor Hall, on the site of Clark Field, and the baseball team moved a short distance east to the second Clark Field.

The outdoor basketball court at the southwest corner of Clark Field, site of UT basketball home games from 1906 to 1916

From 1896 to 1924 Texas Football had a 135–23–3 record at Clark Field.
