= 1922 Southwest Conference football season =

- Sport: Football
- Duration: September 29 – December 9, 1922
- Teams: 7
- Champion: Baylor

SWC seasons
- 1921 1923

1922 Southwest Conference football standings
	Conf.					Overall
Team	W		L		T	W		L		T
Baylor $	5	–	0	–	0	8	–	3	–	0
Texas	2	–	1	–	0	7	–	2	–	0
SMU	2	–	2	–	0	6	–	3	–	1
Texas A&M	2	–	2	–	0	5	–	4	–	1
Oklahoma A&M	2	–	3	–	0	4	–	4	–	1
Arkansas	1	–	3	–	0	4	–	5	–	0
Rice	1	–	4	–	0	4	–	4	–	0
$ – Conference champion

The 1922 Southwest Conference football season was the eighth season of college football played by the member schools of the Southwest Conference (SWC) and was a part of the 1922 college football season. The Baylor Bears won their first conference championship and went undefeated in conference play.

== Results and team statistics ==
Conf. rank	Team	Head coach (s)	Overall record	Conf. record	PPG	PAG
1	Baylor	Frank Bridges	8–3–0 (.727)	5–0–0 (1.000)	26.8	11.6
2	Texas	Berry Whitaker	7–2–0 (.778)	2–1–0 (.667)	22.4	7.6
3	SMU	Ray Morrison & Ewing Y. Freeland	6–3–1 (.650)	2–2–0 (.500)	23.5	6.9
4	Texas A&M	Dana X. Bible	5–4–0 (.556)	2–2–0 (.500)	18.4	7.7
5	Oklahoma A&M	John Maulbetsch	4–4–1 (.500)	2–3–0 (.400)	14.4	9.6
6	Arkansas	Francis Schmidt	4–5–0 (.444)	1–3–0 (.250)	15.9	15.1
7	Phillips	Philip Arbuckle	4–4–0 (.500)	1–4–0 (.200)	12.0	16.0

Key
PPG = Average of points scored per game
PAG = Average of points allowed per game

== Schedules ==
Index to colors and formatting
Non-conference matchup; SWC member won
Non-conference matchup; SWC member lost
Non-conference matchup; tie
SWC teams in **bold**

=== Week One ===
Date	Visiting team	Home team	Site	Result	Attendance	Ref.
September 29	Austin	Texas	Clark Field • Austin, TX	**W** 19–0		
September 29	Howard Payne	Texas A&M	Kyle Field • College Station, TX	**L** 7–13		
September 30	North Texas State Normal	Baylor	Carroll Field • Waco, TX	**W** 55–0		
September 30	SMU freshmen (Note: prior to 1972 Freshmen were not allowed to play Varsity football in college and many teams operated their own freshmen team in conjunction with their varsity one)	SMU	Armstrong Field • Dallas, TX	**W** 16–0		
September 30	Northwestern Oklahoma State	Oklahoma A&M	Lewis Field • Stillwater, OK	**W** 49–0		
September 30	Hendrix	Arkansas	The Hill • Fayetteville, AR	**W** 39–0		

Week	No Game
1	Rice

=== Week Two ===
Date	Visiting team	Home team	Site	Result	Attendance	Ref.
October 7	Simmons (TX)	Baylor	Carroll Field • Waco, TX	**W** 42–0		
October 7	Phillips	Texas	Clark Field • Austin, TX	**W** 41–10		
October 7	North Texas State Normal	SMU	Armstrong Field • Dallas, TX (rivalry)	**W** 66–0		
October 7	Central State Teachers	Oklahoma A&M	Lewis Field • Stillwater, OK	**W** 17–0		
October 7	Drury	Arkansas	The Hill • Fayetteville, AR	**W** 22–0		
October 7	Sam Houston Normal	Rice	Rice Field • Houston, TX	**W** 23–3		

Week	No Game
2	Texas A&M

=== Week Three ===
Date	Visiting team	Home team	Site	Result	Attendance	Ref.
October 14	**Baylor**	**Rice**	Rice Field • Houston, TX	**BAY** 31-0		
October 14	**Oklahoma A&M**	**Texas**	Clark Field • Austin, TX	**UT** 19-7		
October 14	LSU	**SMU**	Fair Park Stadium • Dallas, TX	**W** 51-0		
October 14	Southwestern (TX)	**Texas A&M**	Kyle Field • College Station, TX	**W** 33-0		
October 14	Ouachita Baptist	**Arkansas**	Kavanaugh Field • Little Rock, AR	**L** 7-13		

=== Week Four ===
Date	Visiting team	Home team	Site	Result	Attendance	Ref.
October 20	Austin	**SMU**	Fair Park Stadium • Dallas, TX	**L** 7–10	5,000	
October 20	LSU	**Texas A&M**	Kyle Field • College Station, TX (rivalry)	**W** 47–0		
October 21	**Arkansas**	**Baylor**	Carroll Field • Waco, TX	**BAY** 60-13		
October 21	Vanderbilt	**Texas**	Fair Park Stadium • Dallas, TX	**L** 10–20	11,000	
October 21	**Rice**	**Oklahoma A&M**	Lewis Field • Stillwater, OK	**OAMU** 21–0		

=== Week Five ===
Date	Visiting team	Home team	Site	Result	Attendance	Ref.
October 27	Ouachita Baptist	**Texas A&M**	Kyle Field • Dallas, TX	**W** 19–6		
October 28	Mississippi College	**Baylor**	Cotton Palace • Waco, TX	**W** 40-7		
October 28	Alabama	**Texas**	Clark Field • Austin, TX	**W** 19-10		
October 28	**Oklahoma A&M**	**SMU**	Fair Park Stadium • Dallas, TX	**SMU** 32-6		
October 28	**Arkansas**	LSU	Fair Grounds • Shreveport, LA (rivalry)	**W** 40–6		
October 28	Southwestern (TX)	**Rice**	Rice Field • Houston, TX	**W** 28–6		

=== Week Six ===
Date	Visiting team	Home team	Site	Result	Attendance	Ref.
November 4	**Texas A&M**	**Baylor**	Carroll Field • Waco, TX (rivalry)	**BAY** 13–7		
November 4	**Texas**	**Rice**	Rice Field • Houston, TX (rivalry)	**UT** 29–0		
November 4	Southwestern (TX)	**SMU**	Armstrong Field • Dallas, TX	**W** 46–14		
November 4	**Oklahoma A&M**	TCU	Panther Park • Fort Worth, TX	**L** 14-22		
November 4	Tulsa	**Arkansas**	The Hill • Fayetteville, AR	**L** 6–13		

=== Week Seven ===
Date	Visiting team	Home team	Site	Result	Attendance	Ref.
November 11	**Baylor**	Boston College	Braves Field • Boston, MA	**L** 0-33		
November 11	Southwestern (TX)	**Texas**	Clark Field • Austin, TX	**W** 26-0		
November 11	**Texas A&M**	**SMU**	Fair Park Stadium • Dallas, TX	**SMU** 17-6	9,000	
November 11	Tulsa	**Oklahoma A&M**	Lewis Field • Stillwater, OK (rivalry)	Cancelled		
November 11	**Arkansas**	**Rice**	Rice Field • Houston, TX	**RICE** 31-7		

=== Week Eight ===
Date	Visiting team	Home team	Site	Result	Attendance	Ref.
November 18	**Baylor**	**Oklahoma A&M**	Lewis Field • Stillwater, OK	**BAY** 10–0		
November 18	**Texas**	Oklahoma	Boyd Field • Norman, OK (rivalry)	**W** 32-7		
November 18	**SMU**	**Arkansas**	The Hill • Fayetteville, AR	**ARK** 6-0		
November 18	**Rice**	**Texas A&M**	Kyle Field • College Station, TX	**TAMU** 24–0		

=== Week Nine ===
Date	Visiting team	Home team	Site	Result	Attendance	Ref.
November 25	Arizona	**Rice**	Rice Field • Houston, TX	**W** 14-7		
November 25	Oklahoma	**Oklahoma A&M**	Lewis Field • Stillwater, OK (rivalry)	**T** 3-3		

Week	No Game				
9	Baylor	Texas	SMU	Texas A&M	Arkansas

=== Week Ten ===
Date	Visiting team	Home team	Site	Result	Attendance	Ref.
November 30	**Baylor**	**SMU**	Fair Park Stadium • Dallas, TX	**BAY** 24-0		
November 30	**Texas A&M**	**Texas**	Clark Field • Austin, TX (rivalry)	**TAMU** 14–7	20,000	
November 30	**Oklahoma A&M**	**Arkansas**	Ft. Smith, AR	**OAMU** 13-0		

Week	No Game
10	Rice

=== Week Eleven ===
Date	Visiting team	Home team	Site	Result	Attendance	Ref.
December 9	Haskell	**Baylor**	Schwaub Field • San Antonio, TX	**L** 20-21		
December 9	**SMU**	TCU	Panther Park • Fort Worth, TX (rivalry)	**T** 0-0		

Week	No Game				
11	Texas	Texas A&M	Oklahoma A&M	Arkansas	Rice
