= 1923 SMU Mustangs football team =

American college football season

1923 SMU Mustangs football

SWC champion
- Conference: Southwest Conference
- Record: 9–0 (5–0 SWC)
- Head coach: Ray Morrison (4th season) & Ewing Y. Freeland (2nd season)
- Captain: Wilton J. Daniel
- Home stadium: Ownby Oval, Fair Park Stadium

1923 Southwest Conference football standings
	Conf.					Overall
Team	W		L		T	W		L		T
SMU $	5	–	0	–	0	9	–	0	–	0
Texas	2	–	0	–	1	8	–	0	–	1
TCU	2	–	1	–	0	4	–	5	–	0
Baylor	1	–	1	–	2	5	–	1	–	2
Arkansas	2	–	2	–	0	6	–	2	–	1
Oklahoma A&M	1	–	3	–	0	2	–	8	–	0
Rice	1	–	4	–	0	3	–	5	–	0
Texas A&M	0	–	3	–	1	5	–	3	–	1
$ – Conference champion

The 1923 SMU Mustangs football team represented Southern Methodist University (SMU) as a member of the Southwest Conference (SWC) during the 1923 college football season. Led by co-head coaches Ray Morrison and Ewing Y. Freeland, the Mustangs compiled and overall record of 9–0 with a mark of 5–0 in conference play, winning the SWC title.

== Schedule ==
Date	Time	Opponent	Site	Result	Attendance	Source
September 29		North Texas State Teachers*	Ownby Oval; Dallas, TX (rivalry)	W 41–0		
October 5		Henderson-Brown*	Ownby Oval; Dallas, TX	W 33–0		
October 10		Austin*	Ownby Oval; Dallas, TX	W 10–3		
October 16		Missouri Mines*	Fair Park Stadium; Dallas, TX	W 35–0		
October 26		at Texas A&M	Kyle Field; College Station, TX	W 10–0	4,000	
November 3	3:00 p.m.	TCU	Fair Park Stadium; Dallas, TX (rivalry)	W 40–0		
November 10		Arkansas	Fair Park Stadium; Dallas, TX	W 13–6		
November 17		Oklahoma A&M	Ownby Oval; Dallas, TX	W 9–0		
November 29		Baylor	Fair Park Stadium; Dallas, TX	W 16–0	17,000	
*Non-conference game
