= 1922 SMU Mustangs football team =

American college football season

1922 SMU Mustangs football
- Conference: Southwest Conference
- Record: 6–3–1 (2–2 SWC)
- Head coach: Ray Morrison (3rd season) & Ewing Y. Freeland (1st season)
- Captain: John McLean Brooks
- Home stadium: Armstrong Field, Fair Park Stadium

1922 Southwest Conference football standings
	Conf.					Overall
Team	W		L		T	W		L		T
Baylor $	5	–	0	–	0	8	–	3	–	0
Texas	2	–	1	–	0	7	–	2	–	0
SMU	2	–	2	–	0	6	–	3	–	1
Texas A&M	2	–	2	–	0	5	–	4	–	1
Oklahoma A&M	2	–	3	–	0	4	–	4	–	1
Arkansas	1	–	3	–	0	4	–	5	–	0
Rice	1	–	4	–	0	4	–	4	–	0
$ – Conference champion

The 1922 SMU Mustangs football team represented Southern Methodist University (SMU) as a member of the Southwest Conference (SWC) during the 1922 college football season. Led by co-head coaches Ray Morrison and Ewing Y. Freeland, the Mustangs compiled and overall record of 6–3–1 with a mark of 2–2 in conference play, tying for third in the SWC.

== Schedule ==
Date	Opponent	Site	Result	Attendance	Source
September 30	SMU freshmen*	Armstrong Field; Dallas, TX	W 16–0		
October 7	North Texas State Normal*	Armstrong Field; Dallas, TX (rivalry)	W 66–0		
October 14	LSU*	Fair Park Stadium; Dallas, TX	W 51–0	7,000	
October 20	Austin*	Fair Park Stadium; Dallas, TX	L 7–10	5,000	
October 28	Oklahoma A&M	Fair Park Stadium; Dallas, TX	W 32–6		
November 4	Southwestern (TX)*	Armstrong Field; Dallas, TX	W 46–14		
November 11	Texas A&M	Fair Park Stadium; Dallas, TX	W 17–6	9,000	
November 18	at Arkansas	The Hill; Fayetteville, AR	L 0–6		
November 30	Baylor	Fair Park Stadium; Dallas, TX	L 0–24		
December 9	at TCU*	Panther Park; Fort Worth, TX (rivalry)	T 0–0		
*Non-conference game
