= 1923 North Texas State Teachers Eagles football team =

American college football season

1923 North Texas State Teachers Eagles football
- Conference: Texas Intercollegiate Athletic Association
- Record: 3–5 (3–2 TIAA)
- Head coach: Theron J. Fouts (4th season)
- Home stadium: Eagle Field

1923 Texas Intercollegiate Athletic Association football standings
	Conf.					Overall
Team	W		L		T	W		L		T
Austin $	4	–	0	–	1	7	–	2	–	1
Howard Payne	3	–	1	–	2	4	–	3	–	2
Simmons (TX)	2	–	1	–	2	3	–	5	–	2
Rice	2	–	1	–	0	3	–	5	–	0
Southwestern (TX)	2	–	1	–	1	2	–	5	–	1
North Texas State Teachers	3	–	2	–	0	3	–	5	–	0
Trinity (TX)	3	–	3	–	0	6	–	3	–	0
Sam Houston State	3	–	3	–	0	4	–	4	–	0
Southwest Texas State	3	–	4	–	0	4	–	4	–	0
West Texas State	1	–	3	–	0	4	–	4	–	1
East Texas State	1	–	4	–	0	2	–	6	–	0
Daniel Baker	1	–	5	–	0	1	–	6	–	0
$ – Conference champion

The 1923 North Texas State Teachers Eagles football team was an American football team that represented the North Texas State Teachers College (now known as the University of North Texas) during the 1924 college football season as a member of the Texas Intercollegiate Athletic Association (TIAA). In their fourth year under head coach Theron J. Fouts, the team compiled an overall record of 3–5 with a mark of 3–2 in conference play, placing sixth in the TIAA.

== Schedule ==
Date	Opponent	Site	Result	Source
September 29	at SMU*	Ownby Oval; University Park, TX (rivalry)	L 0–41	
October 6	at Baylor*	Carroll Field; Waco, TX	L 7–33	
October 25	North Texas Aggies*	Eagle Field; Denton, TX	L 13–34	
November 2	at Trinity (TX)	Yoakum Field; Waxahachie, TX	L 0–6	
November 10	Sam Houston State	Eagle Field; Denton, TX	W 18–6	
November 17	West Texas State	Eagle Field; Denton, TX	W 14–6	
November 22	at Austin	Cashion Field; Sherman, TX	L 0–28	
November 29	at Southwest Texas State	Evans Field; San Marcos, TX	W 12–7	
*Non-conference game
