= 1923 Baylor Bears football team =

American college football season

1923 Baylor Bears football
- Conference: Southwest Conference
- Record: 5–1–2 (1–1–2 SWC)
- Head coach: Frank Bridges (4th season)
- Captain: Roy Carter Williamson
- Home stadium: Carroll Field, Cotton Palace

1923 Southwest Conference football standings
	Conf.					Overall
Team	W		L		T	W		L		T
SMU $	5	–	0	–	0	9	–	0	–	0
Texas	2	–	0	–	1	8	–	0	–	1
TCU	2	–	1	–	0	4	–	5	–	0
Baylor	1	–	1	–	2	5	–	1	–	2
Arkansas	2	–	2	–	0	6	–	2	–	1
Oklahoma A&M	1	–	3	–	0	2	–	8	–	0
Rice	1	–	4	–	0	3	–	5	–	0
Texas A&M	0	–	3	–	1	5	–	3	–	1
$ – Conference champion

The 1923 Baylor Bears football team represented Baylor University in the Southwest Conference (SWC) during the 1923 college football season. In its fourth and final season under head coach Frank Bridges, the Baylor football team compiled a 5–1–2 record (1–1–2 against conference opponents), finished in fourth place in the conference, and outscored opponents by a combined total of 104 to 39. The team's sole loss was to SMU by a 16–0 score in the final game of the season.

The team played its home games at Carroll Field in Waco, Texas. Roy Carter Williamson was the team captain.

== Schedule ==
Date	Opponent	Site	Result	Attendance	Source
September 29	at Simmons (TX)*	West Texas Fairgrounds; Abilene, TX	W 14–0	5,000	
October 6	North Texas State Teachers*	Carroll Field; Waco, TX	W 33–7		
October 13	Howard Payne*	Carroll Field; Waco, TX	W 20–6		
October 20	at Arkansas	The Hill; Fayetteville, AR	W 14–0		
October 27	Ouachita*	Cotton Palace; Waco, TX	W 16–3		
November 3	Texas A&M	Cotton Palace; Waco, TX (rivalry)	T 0–0		
November 10	Texas	Cotton Palace; Waco, TX (rivalry)	T 7–7		
November 29	at SMU	Fair Park Stadium; Dallas, TX	L 0–16	17,000	
*Non-conference game
