= 1923 Texas A&M Aggies football team =

American college football season

1923 Texas A&M Aggies football
- Conference: Southwest Conference
- Record: 5–3–1 (0–3–1 SWC)
- Head coach: Dana X. Bible (6th season)
- Home stadium: Kyle Field

1923 Southwest Conference football standings
	Conf.					Overall
Team	W		L		T	W		L		T
SMU $	5	–	0	–	0	9	–	0	–	0
Texas	2	–	0	–	1	8	–	0	–	1
TCU	2	–	1	–	0	4	–	5	–	0
Baylor	1	–	1	–	2	5	–	1	–	2
Arkansas	2	–	2	–	0	6	–	2	–	1
Oklahoma A&M	1	–	3	–	0	2	–	8	–	0
Rice	1	–	4	–	0	3	–	5	–	0
Texas A&M	0	–	3	–	1	5	–	3	–	1
$ – Conference champion

The 1923 Texas A&M Aggies football team represented the Agricultural and Mechanical College of Texas—now known as Texas A&M University—as a member of the Southwest Conference (SWC) during the 1923 college football season. In their sixth year under head coach Dana X. Bible, the team compiled an overall record of 5–3–1, with a mark of 0–3–1 in conference play, and finished eighth in the SWC.

== Schedule ==
Date	Opponent	Site	Result	Attendance	Source
September 22	Sam Houston State*	Kyle Field; College Station, TX	W 53–0		
September 28	Howard Payne*	Kyle Field; College Station, TX	W 21–0		
October 5	Southwestern (TX)*	Kyle Field; College Station, TX	W 13–0		
October 13	vs. Sewanee*	Fair Park Stadium; Dallas, TX	W 14–0		
October 20	at LSU*	State Field; Baton Rouge, LA (rivalry)	W 28–0		
October 26	SMU	Kyle Field; College Station, TX	L 0–10	4,000	
November 3	at Baylor	Cotton Palace; Waco, TX (rivalry)	T 0–0		
November 17	at Rice	Rice Field; Houston, TX	L 6–7		
November 29	Texas	Kyle Field; College Station, TX (rivalry)	L 0–6		
*Non-conference game
