= 1923 Texas Longhorns football team =

American college football season

1923 Texas Longhorns football
- Conference: Southwest Conference
- Record: 8–0–1 (2–0–1 SWC)
- Head coach: E. J. Stewart (1st season)
- Captains: Ed Bluestein; Buddy Tynes
- Home stadium: Clark Field

Uniform
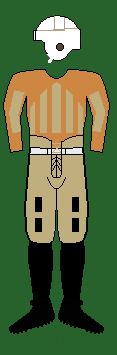

1923 Southwest Conference football standings
	Conf.					Overall
Team	W		L		T	W		L		T
SMU $	5	–	0	–	0	9	–	0	–	0
Texas	2	–	0	–	1	8	–	0	–	1
TCU	2	–	1	–	0	4	–	5	–	0
Baylor	1	–	1	–	2	5	–	1	–	2
Arkansas	2	–	2	–	0	6	–	2	–	1
Oklahoma A&M	1	–	3	–	0	2	–	8	–	0
Rice	1	–	4	–	0	3	–	5	–	0
Texas A&M	0	–	3	–	1	5	–	3	–	1
$ – Conference champion

The 1923 Texas Longhorns football team was an American football team that represented the University of Texas (now known as the University of Texas at Austin) as a member of the Southwest Conference (SWC) during the 1923 college football season. In their first year under head coach E. J. Stewart, the Longhorns compiled an overall record of 8–0–1 and a mark of 2–0–1 in conference play, and finished second in the SWC. Texas shutout seven of nine opponents and outscored all opponents by a collective total of 241 to 21

Texas upset a powerful Vanderbilt squad 16 to 0 at the State Fair. The highlight of the game was a run by Oscar Eckhardt, running over multiple Vanderbilt tacklers and regaining his balance with a hand on the ground at the 8-yard line.

== Schedule ==
Date	Opponent	Site	Result	Attendance	Source
September 28	Austin*	Clark Field; Austin, TX	W 31–0		
October 6	Phillips*	Clark Field; Austin, TX	W 51–0		
October 13	vs. Tulane*	Magnolia Ballpark; Beaumont, TX	W 33–0	8,000	
October 20	vs. Vanderbilt*	Fair Park Stadium; Dallas, TX	W 16–0	15,000	
October 27	Southwestern (TX)*	Clark Field; Austin, TX	W 44–0		
November 3	Rice	Clark Field; Austin, TX (rivalry)	W 27–0		
November 10	at Baylor	Cotton Palace; Waco, TX (rivalry)	T 7–7		
November 17	Oklahoma*	Clark Field; Austin, TX (rivalry)	W 26–14		
November 29	at Texas A&M	Kyle Field; College Station, TX (rivalry)	W 6–0		
*Non-conference game
