= 1923 TCU Horned Frogs football team =

American college football season

1923 TCU Horned Frogs football
- Conference: Southwest Conference
- Record: 4–5 (2–1 SWC)
- Head coach: Matty Bell (1st season)
- Captain: Blair Cherry
- Home stadium: Panther Park

1923 Southwest Conference football standings
	Conf.					Overall
Team	W		L		T	W		L		T
SMU $	5	–	0	–	0	9	–	0	–	0
Texas	2	–	0	–	1	8	–	0	–	1
TCU	2	–	1	–	0	4	–	5	–	0
Baylor	1	–	1	–	2	5	–	1	–	2
Arkansas	2	–	2	–	0	6	–	2	–	1
Oklahoma A&M	1	–	3	–	0	2	–	8	–	0
Rice	1	–	4	–	0	3	–	5	–	0
Texas A&M	0	–	3	–	1	5	–	3	–	1
$ – Conference champion

The 1923 TCU Horned Frogs football team represented Texas Christian University (TCU) as a member of the Southwest Conference (SWC) during the 1923 college football season. Led by first-year head coach Matty Bell, the Horned Frogs compiled an overall 4–5 record with a conference mark of 2–1, placing third in their inaugural year as members of the Southwest Conference. TCU played their home games at Panther Park in Fort Worth, Texas. The team's captain was Blair Cherry, who played end.

== Schedule ==
Date	Time	Opponent	Site	Result	Attendance	Source
October 6		at Oklahoma A&M	Lewis Field; Stillwater, OK	W 7–6		
October 13	3:00 p.m.	Simmons (TX)*	Panther Park; Fort Worth, TX	W 16–0		
October 20	3:00 p.m.	Daniel Baker*	Panther Park; Fort Worth, TX	W 47–6	2,000	
October 27	3:00 p.m.	Centenary*	Panther Park; Fort Worth, TX	L 0–23		
November 3	3:00 p.m.	at SMU	Fair Park Stadium; Dallas, TX (rivalry)	L 0–40		
November 12	3:00 p.m.	Austin*	Panther Park; Fort Worth, TX	L 0–27		
November 17		at Howard Payne*	Brownwood, TX	L 7–20		
November 23	3:00 p.m.	Trinity (TX)*	Panther Park; Fort Worth, TX	L 10–16		
November 29		at Rice	Rice Field; Houston, TX	W 6–0		
*Non-conference game; All times are in Central time
