= 1924 Iowa State Cyclones football team =

American college football season

1924 Iowa State Cyclones football
- Conference: Missouri Valley Conference
- Record: 4–3–1 (3–2 MVC)
- Head coach: Sam Willaman (3rd season)
- Captain: Harry Schmidt
- Home stadium: State Field

1924 Missouri Valley Conference football standings
	Conf.					Overall
Team	W		L		T	W		L		T
No. 10 Missouri $	5	–	1	–	0	7	–	2	–	0
Nebraska	3	–	1	–	0	5	–	3	–	0
Drake	3	–	1	–	1	5	–	2	–	1
Grinnell	2	–	1	–	0	3	–	3	–	0
Iowa State	3	–	2	–	0	4	–	3	–	1
Oklahoma	2	–	3	–	1	2	–	5	–	1
Kansas	2	–	4	–	1	2	–	5	–	1
Kansas State	1	–	4	–	1	3	–	4	–	1
Washington University	0	–	4	–	0	4	–	4	–	0
$ – Conference champion; Rankings from Dickinson System

The 1924 Iowa State Cyclones football team represented Iowa State College of Agricultural and Mechanic Arts (later renamed Iowa State University) in the Missouri Valley Conference during the 1924 college football season. In their third season under head coach Sam Willaman, the Cyclones compiled a 4–3–1 record (3–2 against conference opponents), finished in fifth place in the conference, and outscored opponents by a combined total of 87 to 68. They played their home games at State Field in Ames, Iowa.

Harry Schmidt was the team captain. Schmidt and Norton Behm were selected as first-team all-conference players.

== Schedule ==
Date	Time	Opponent	Site	Result	Attendance
September 27	2:30 pm	Nebraska Wesleyan*	State Field; Ames, IA	W 23–13	
October 4	2:30 pm	at Wisconsin*	Camp Randall Stadium; Madison, WI	L 0–17	
October 11	2:30 pm	at Kansas	Memorial Stadium; Lawrence, KS	W 13–10	
October 18	2:30 pm	Missouri^{†}	State Field; Ames, IA (rivalry)	L 0–7	
November 1	2:30 pm	at Kansas State	Memorial Stadium; Manhattan, KS (rivalry)	W 21–0	
November 8	2:30 pm	at Minnesota*	Memorial Stadium; Minneapolis, MN	T 7–7	12,000
November 15	2:30 pm	at Grinnell	Ward Field; Grinnell, IA	L 13–14	
November 22	2:00 pm	Drake	State Field; Ames, IA	W 10–0	
*Non-conference game; ^{†}Homecoming

== Roster ==
1924 Iowa State Cyclones football roster
- 1 Harry Schmidt - Guard (Senior) (C)
- 2 Johnny Behm - Quarterback (Junior)
- 3 G. Zeke Roberts - Halfback (Senior)
- 4 William "Bill" Anderson - Tackle (Junior)
- 5 R. Malone
- 6 Norman "Bud" Thomas (Sophomore)
- 7 Frank "Tiny" Mayer - Tackle (Junior)
- 8 R. "Casey" Shawhan - End (Sophomore)
- 9 F. W. Greenlee
- 10 R. C. Walling - End
- 11 R. C. Greenlee - Quarterback
- 12 C. "Win" Wingert - Fullback (Senior)
- 13 R. A. Prunty
- 14 W. Sulzback - Center
- 15 E. Easley
- 16 Wm. Graham
- 17 N. Symonds - End (Sophomore)
- 20 W. Berger
- 21 C. M. Wheeler
- 22 R. Reighard
- 23 E. "Swede" Larson - Guard (Senior)
- 25 Raymond H. Galbraith - Tackle (Sophomore)
- 26 E. J. Anderson - End
- 28 Karl "Petey" Bond - End (Senior)
- 30 E. Sage - Halfback
- 31 Norton Behm - Halfback (Junior)
- 33 C. "Hick" Palm - Fullback (Senior)
- 34 John Rasmess - Guard (Junior)
- 35 Roy "Shorty" Longstreet - Center (Senior)
- 36 H. Owen - Halfback
- 37 F. L. Tawzer - Guard/Tackle
- 38 M. Vifquain - End
- 39 L. W. Grimes - End (Sophomore)
- 40 E. Weimer - End
- 41 Wm. "Spike" Nave - Tackle/End (Junior)
- 42 R. J. "Bob" Fisher - Halfback (Sophomore)
- 43 Alvin Thornberg - Guard (Junior)
- 44 Ed Hill - Fullback (Sophomore)
- 44/45 Chuck Hill - Fullback (Junior)
- 45 W. W. Zellers
- 46 R. Heinton - Guard
- 47 Roland "Bud" Coe - Fullback (Sophomore)
- 48 A. C. Burt
- 49 Phil Petty
- 50 R. Storvick
- 51 G. Brockmeyer - Tackle
- 52 Powek - Center
- 60 F. M. Bondor - Fullback
- 61 D. Chesneau
- 62 P. Konecky
- 63 Woodhull - Halfback
- Axelson
- Beard
- Buchanan
- Green
- H. Hill
- Richey
- Simons

== Coaching staff ==
Name	Position	Year at Iowa State	Previous job
Sam Willaman	Head coach	3rd	East Tech HS (OH)
George Hauser	Line Coach	1st	Minnesota
Snyder			
McPhee			
Peckinpaugh			
Bill Chandler			
Bill Aslin	Freshman Coach		
Frank Willaman	Freshman Coach		
