= 1924 Washington University Pikers football team =

American college football season

1924 Washington University Pikers football
- Conference: Missouri Valley Conference
- Record: 4–4 (0–4 MVC)
- Head coach: Byron Wimberly (2nd season)
- Home stadium: Francis Field

1924 Missouri Valley Conference football standings
	Conf.					Overall
Team	W		L		T	W		L		T
No. 10 Missouri $	5	–	1	–	0	7	–	2	–	0
Nebraska	3	–	1	–	0	5	–	3	–	0
Drake	3	–	1	–	1	5	–	2	–	1
Grinnell	2	–	1	–	0	3	–	3	–	0
Iowa State	3	–	2	–	0	4	–	3	–	1
Oklahoma	2	–	3	–	1	2	–	5	–	1
Kansas	2	–	4	–	1	2	–	5	–	1
Kansas State	1	–	4	–	1	3	–	4	–	1
Washington University	0	–	4	–	0	4	–	4	–	0
$ – Conference champion; Rankings from Dickinson System

The 1924 Washington University Pikers football team represented Washington University in St. Louis as a member of the Missouri Valley Conference (MVC) during the 1924 college football season. Led by Byron Wimberly in his second and final season as head coach, the Pikers compiled an overall record of 4–4 with a mark of 0–4 in conference play, placing last out of nine teams in the MVC. Washington University played home games at Francis Field in St. Louis.

== Schedule ==
Date	Time	Opponent	Site	Result	Attendance	Source
October 4	3:00 p.m.	Drury*	Francis Field; St. Louis, MO	W 7–0		
October 11		at Grinnell	Grinnell, IA	L 0–14		
October 25	2:30 p.m.	Missouri Mines*	Francis Field; St. Louis, MO	W 13–0	5,000	
November 1	2:30 p.m.	Kansas^{†}	Francis Field; St. Louis, MO	L 0–48	6,000	
November 8	2:30 p.m.	Millikin*	Francis Field; St. Louis, MO	W 10–0	2,000	
November 15		at Missouri	Rollins Field; Columbia, MO	L 0–35		
November 22	2:00 p.m.	Oklahoma	Francis Field; St. Louis, MO	L 0–7	6,000	
November 27	2:00 p.m.	Mississippi A&M*	Francis Field; St. Louis, MO	W 12–3	5,000	
*Non-conference game; ^{†}Homecoming; All times are in Central time
