= 1922 TCU Horned Frogs football team =

American college football season

1922 TCU Horned Frogs football
- Conference: Texas Intercollegiate Athletic Association
- Record: 2–5–3 (0–3–2 TIAA)
- Head coach: John McKnight (1st season)
- Captain: Aubrey D. "Judge" Green
- Home stadium: Panther Park

1922 Texas Intercollegiate Athletic Association football standings
| | Conf. | | | | | Overall |
| Team | W | | L | | T | W | | L | | T |
|---|---|---|---|---|---|---|---|---|---|---|
| Austin $ | 5 | – | 1 | – | 0 | 6 | – | 2 | – | 0 |
| North Texas State Normal | 3 | – | 0 | – | 0 | 5 | – | 2 | – | 1 |
| Rice | 1 | – | 0 | – | 0 | 4 | – | 4 | – | 0 |
| Simmons (TX) | 4 | – | 1 | – | 1 | 5 | – | 3 | – | 1 |
| Howard Payne | 4 | – | 2 | – | 1 | 6 | – | 2 | – | 1 |
| Trinity (TX) | 2 | – | 2 | – | 2 | 3 | – | 2 | – | 3 |
| Southwestern (TX) | 2 | – | 3 | – | 0 | 4 | – | 6 | – | 0 |
| Daniel Baker | 2 | – | 4 | – | 0 | 2 | – | 6 | – | 0 |
| East Texas State | 0 | – | 2 | – | 0 | 4 | – | 5 | – | 0 |
| West Texas State | 0 | – | 2 | – | 0 | 2 | – | 8 | – | 0 |
| Southwest Texas State | 0 | – | 3 | – | 0 | 3 | – | 3 | – | 0 |
| TCU | 0 | – | 3 | – | 2 | 2 | – | 5 | – | 3 |
$ – Conference champion

The 1922 TCU Horned Frogs football team represented Texas Christian University (TCU) as a member of the Texas Intercollegiate Athletic Association (TIAA) during the 1922 college football season. Led by John McKnight in his first and only year as head coach, the Horned Frogs compiled an overall record of 2–5–3 with a mark of 0–3–2 in TIAA play. TCU played their home games at Panther Park in Fort Worth, Texas. The team's captain was Aubrey D. "Judge" Green, who played end.

== Season summary ==
The 1922 season was John McKnight's only season as head coach of the TCU Horned Frogs. The team finished with a 2–5–3 record and was outscored by its opponents, 113 to 91. The Horned Frogs opened the season with a win over Burleson and later defeated East Texas State, but did not record another victory during the remainder of the season.

== Schedule ==
| Date | Time | Opponent | Site | Result | Attendance | Source |
|---|---|---|---|---|---|---|
| October 7 | | at Dallas* | Gardner Park; Dallas, TX | W 21–6 | | |
| October 14 | | vs. Simmons (TX) | Athletic Park; Wichita Falls, TX | T 7–7 | 1,000 | |
| October 21 | | Daniel Baker | Panther Park; Fort Worth, TX | L 13–21 | | |
| October 28 | | at Tulsa* | Lee Stadium; Tulsa, OK | L 0–21 | | |
| November 4 | 3:00 p.m. | Oklahoma A&M* | Panther Park; Fort Worth, TX | W 22–14 | | |
| November 11 | | at Austin | Sherman, TX | L 7–20 | 3,000 | |
| November 18 | | Howard Payne | Panther Park; Fort Worth, TX | L 14–26 | | |
| November 24 | | at Trinity (TX) | Yoakum Stadium; Waxahachie, TX | T 7–7 | 3,000 | |
| November 30 | | at Kansas State* | Memorial Stadium; Manhattan, KS | L 0–45 | | |
| December 9 | | SMU* | Panther Park; Fort Worth, TX (rivalry) | T 0–0 | | |
*Non-conference game; All times are in Central time
