= 1922 Southwest Texas State Bobcats football team =

American college football season

1922 Southwest Texas State Bobcats football
- Conference: Texas Intercollegiate Athletic Association
- Record: 3–3 (0–3 TIAA)
- Head coach: Oscar W. Strahan (4th season)
- Home stadium: Evans Field

1922 Texas Intercollegiate Athletic Association football standings
	Conf.					Overall
Team	W		L		T	W		L		T
Austin $	5	–	1	–	0	6	–	2	–	0
North Texas State Normal	3	–	0	–	0	5	–	2	–	1
Rice	1	–	0	–	0	4	–	4	–	0
Simmons (TX)	4	–	1	–	1	5	–	3	–	1
Howard Payne	4	–	2	–	1	6	–	2	–	1
Trinity (TX)	2	–	2	–	2	3	–	2	–	3
Southwestern (TX)	2	–	3	–	0	4	–	6	–	0
Daniel Baker	2	–	4	–	0	2	–	6	–	0
East Texas State	0	–	2	–	0	4	–	5	–	0
West Texas State	0	–	2	–	0	2	–	8	–	0
Southwest Texas State	0	–	3	–	0	3	–	3	–	0
TCU	0	–	3	–	2	2	–	5	–	3
$ – Conference champion

The 1922 Southwest Texas State Bobcats football team was an American football team that represented the Southwest Texas State Normal College (now known as Texas State University) during the 1922 college football season as a member of the Texas Intercollegiate Athletic Association (TIAA). In their fourth year under head coach Oscar W. Strahan, the team compiled an overall record of 3–3 with a mark of 0–3 in conference play.

== Schedule ==
Date	Opponent	Site	Result	Source
October 7	at Southwestern (TX)	Snyder Field; Georgetown, TX	L 0–20	
October 21	Sam Houston Normal*	Evans Field; San Marcos, TX (rivalry)	W 22–0	
October 28	Tarleton Agricultural*	Evans Field; San Marcos, TX	W 24–0	
November 11	Howard Payne	Evans Field; San Marcos, TX	L 6–24	
November 18	Dallas*	Evans Field; San Marcos, TX	W 27–13	
November 30	at North Texas State Normal	Eagle Field; Denton, TX	L 13–16	
*Non-conference game
