= 1924 Oklahoma Sooners football team =

American college football season

1924 Oklahoma Sooners football
- Conference: Missouri Valley Conference
- Record: 2–5–1 (2–3–1 MVC)
- Head coach: Bennie Owen (20th season)
- Offensive scheme: Single-wing
- Captain: Obie Bristow
- Home stadium: Owen Field

1924 Missouri Valley Conference football standings
| | Conf. | | | | | Overall |
| Team | W | | L | | T | W | | L | | T |
|---|---|---|---|---|---|---|---|---|---|---|
| No. 10 Missouri $ | 5 | – | 1 | – | 0 | 7 | – | 2 | – | 0 |
| Nebraska | 3 | – | 1 | – | 0 | 5 | – | 3 | – | 0 |
| Drake | 3 | – | 1 | – | 1 | 5 | – | 2 | – | 1 |
| Grinnell | 2 | – | 1 | – | 0 | 3 | – | 3 | – | 0 |
| Iowa State | 3 | – | 2 | – | 0 | 4 | – | 3 | – | 1 |
| Oklahoma | 2 | – | 3 | – | 1 | 2 | – | 5 | – | 1 |
| Kansas | 2 | – | 4 | – | 1 | 2 | – | 5 | – | 1 |
| Kansas State | 1 | – | 4 | – | 1 | 3 | – | 4 | – | 1 |
| Washington University | 0 | – | 4 | – | 0 | 4 | – | 4 | – | 0 |
$ – Conference champion; Rankings from Dickinson System

The 1924 Oklahoma Sooners football team represented the University of Oklahoma as a member of the Missouri Valley Conference (MVC) during the 1924 college football season. In their 20th season under head coach Bennie Owen, the Sooners compiled an overall record of 2–5–1 with a mark of 2–3–1 in conference placing, placing sixth in the MVC, and were outscored by opponents by a combined total of 80 to 28.

No Sooners were recognized as All-Americans, and back Obie Bristow was the only Sooner to receive all-conference honors.

== Schedule ==
| Date | Time | Opponent | Site | Result | Attendance | Source |
|---|---|---|---|---|---|---|
| October 4 | | Central State Teachers* | Owen Field; Norman, OK | L 0–2 | | |
| October 11 | | Nebraska | Owen Field; Norman, OK (rivalry) | W 14–7 | | |
| October 25 | | at Drake | Drake Stadium; Des Moines, IA | L 0–28 | | |
| November 1 | | at Oklahoma A&M* | Lewis Field; Stillwater, OK (Bedlam) | L 0–6 | | |
| November 8 | | Missouri | Owen Field; Norman, OK (rivalry) | L 0–10 | | |
| November 15 | | at Kansas | Memorial Stadium; Lawrence, KS | L 0–20 | | |
| November 22 | 2:00 p.m. | at Washington University | Francis Field; St. Louis, MO | W 7–0 | 6,000 | |
| November 26 | | Kansas State | Owen Field; Norman, OK | T 7–7 | | |
*Non-conference game; All times are in Central time

== Roster ==
1924 Oklahoma Sooners Football
| Dale Arbuckle; Obie Bristow; Ed Brockman; Roy Guffey; Glen Hartford; Earl Hendricks | Viene Hendricks; E.B. Johnson; Roy Lamb; Ram Morrison; William Patterson; James Pennick | Herbert Schaefer; Elmer Slough; James Thompson; Pollock Wallace; Lazelle White |
