= 1923 Nebraska Cornhuskers football team =

American college football season

1923 Nebraska Cornhuskers football

MVC co-champion
- Conference: Missouri Valley Conference
- Record: 4–2–2 (3–0–2 MVC)
- Head coach: Fred Dawson (3rd season)
- Home stadium: Memorial Stadium

1923 Missouri Valley Conference football standings
	Conf.					Overall
Team	W		L		T	W		L		T
Kansas +	3	–	0	–	3	5	–	0	–	3
Nebraska +	3	–	0	–	2	4	–	2	–	2
Drake	3	–	1	–	0	5	–	2	–	0
Iowa State	3	–	2	–	1	4	–	3	–	1
Kansas State	2	–	2	–	2	4	–	2	–	2
Oklahoma	2	–	4	–	0	3	–	5	–	0
Missouri	1	–	3	–	2	2	–	3	–	3
Grinnell	1	–	3	–	0	2	–	6	–	0
Washington University	1	–	4	–	0	3	–	5	–	0
+ – Conference co-champions

The 1923 Nebraska Cornhuskers football team was an American football team that represented the University of Nebraska in the Missouri Valley Conference (MVC) during the 1923 college football season. In its third season under head coach Fred Dawson, the team compiled a 4–2–2 record (3–0–2 against conference opponents), won the MVC championship, and outscored opponents by a total of 112 to 71. The team played its home games at Memorial Stadium in Lincoln, Nebraska.

== Before the season ==
Coach Dawson returned for his third season with two conference championships to his credit and a new home playing field following the completion of Memorial Stadium, but it was a hard start to the season. The most pronounced change was the absence of Jack Best, the team's trainer of the previous 32 seasons dating to the beginning of the program, who had died shortly after the end of the 1922 season. The first team on the schedule was not the typical tune-up patsy scrimmage of most seasons past, as coach Dawson had arranged an opening battle on the road against Illinois in order to infuse his team with a heavy dose of experience early in the year. Making things additionally rough to start the year, only nine starters from last season's title team were returning to play for the Cornhuskers.

== Schedule ==
Date	Time	Opponent	Site	Result	Attendance	Source
October 6	3:00 p.m.	at Illinois*	Memorial Stadium; Champaign, IL	L 7–24		
October 13	2:00 p.m.	Oklahoma	Memorial Stadium; Lincoln, NE (rivalry)	W 24–0		
October 20	2:00 p.m.	Kansas^{†}	Memorial Stadium; Lincoln, NE (rivalry)	T 0–0	20,000+	
October 27	2:30 p.m.	at Missouri	Rollins Field; Columbia, MO (rivalry)	T 7–7		
November 10	2:00 p.m.	Notre Dame*	Memorial Stadium; Lincoln, NE (rivalry)	W 14–7	30,000	
November 17	2:30 p.m.	at Iowa State	State Field; Ames, IA (rivalry)	W 26–14		
November 24	2:00 p.m.	Syracuse*	Memorial Stadium; Lincoln, NE	L 0–7	35,000	
November 29	2:00 p.m.	Kansas State	Memorial Stadium; Lincoln, NE (rivalry)	W 34–12		
*Non-conference game; ^{†}Homecoming; All times are in Central time

== Roster ==
Bassett, Henry (Sr.)T; Berquist, Joy (Sr.)RG; Bloodgood, Elbert (So.) QB; Collins, Melvin (So.) E Dewitz, Herbert (Sr.)HB; Dewitz, Rufus (Jr.) HB; Gately QB; Halberslaben G Hartman, Cecil (Sr.)FB; Hendrickson, Emil (Jr.) G Hill T Hubka, Ladimer (So.) E Hutchinson, Harold (So.) C Lewellen, Verne (Sr.)QB; Locke, Roland (So.) HB; Mackey C	McAllister, Eugene (Jr.) E McGlasson, Ross (Sr.)G; Myers, Douglas (So.) E Noble, Dave (Sr.)HB; Ogden, Warren (So.) G Packer, Bloyce G Popelar E Pospisil, Frank G Randolph, George HB; Reed G Rhodes, John (So.) E Robertson, Rob (So.) E Rorby, Noel C Weir, Ed (Jr.) T Wostoupel, Joseph (So.) E

== Coaching staff ==
Coach	Position	First year	Alma mater
Fred Dawson	Head coach	1921	Princeton
Henry Schulte	Line coach	1921	Michigan
Owen Frank	Backfield coach	1921	Nebraska
Bill Day	Centers coach	1921	Nebraska
Leo Sherer	Ends coach	1923	Nebraska
Hartley	Backfield coach	1923	Unknown
James Tyson	Manager	1923	Nebraska

== Game summaries ==
=== Illinois ===
Nebraska at Illinois

Team	1	2	Total
Nebraska			7
• Illinois			24

- Date: October 6
- Location: Memorial Stadium • Champaign, Illinois

Nebraska had not faced Illinois since 1905, but had racked up victories in every contest against the Fighting Illini to date. This time, however, the game was to be played in Champaign instead of Lincoln, and the Cornhuskers had only two weeks of practice to prepare for this opening contest. The game was held close, and the outcome was in doubt until the fourth quarter, when Illinois finally overpowered Nebraska and pulled away for the win. The Cornhuskers went home with an opening loss, but held the series advantage at 4–1.

=== Oklahoma ===
Oklahoma at Nebraska

Team	1	2	Total
Oklahoma			0
• Nebraska			24

- Date: October 13
- Location: Memorial Stadium • Lincoln, Nebraska

The Cornhuskers hosted Oklahoma for the first game played at the new Memorial Stadium in Lincoln. To prevent confusion due to the similarity of Oklahoma's red uniforms, Nebraska wore blue in this game. The lopsided score does not tell the tale of the game, which was a bitter contest of near equals except for the breaks that fell in favor of the Cornhuskers. The Sooners repeatedly threatened to score and were thwarted by untimely errors, and the final Nebraska score came on another near-touchdown by Oklahoma that was turned over and returned 90 yards. Oklahoma remained winless in the series, trailing Nebraska 0–4–1.

=== Kansas ===
Kansas at Nebraska

Team	1	2	3	4	Total
Kansas	0	0	0	0	0
Nebraska	0	0	0	0	0

- Date: October 20
- Location: Memorial Stadium • Lincoln, Nebraska
- Game attendance: 20,000+

Although this was not the first game to be played at the new Memorial Stadium, this was the game associated with the official dedication of the facility, scheduled to coincide with homecoming. According to the Nebraska yearbook, there was apparently a streak of home field losses for area teams dedicating new stadiums at about this time, and although Nebraska did not drop this game, they also failed to get a win against visiting Kansas. Where Nebraska had the offense to move the ball, Kansas produced some stingy goal line stands to keep the Cornhuskers off the board for all four quarters, leaving both teams scoreless at the final whistle. Nebraska's overall lead in the series thus remained unchanged, at 19–9–2.

=== Missouri ===
Nebraska at Missouri

Team	1	2	Total
Nebraska			7
Missouri			7

- Date: October 27
- Location: Rollins Field • Columbia, Missouri

For a consecutive game, Nebraska came out looking solid and played strong football, only to be met by an equally strong team opposing them. It was not a game filled with errors and mishaps, but rather two well-coached teams that matched up equally. As a result, the game ended in a 7–7 tie, the second consecutive tie game for Nebraska. The only other time Nebraska had tied two consecutive games was in 1919, and it never happened again. Missouri still had a long way to go if they hoped to catch up the series, as they still lagged behind 3–13–1.

=== Notre Dame ===
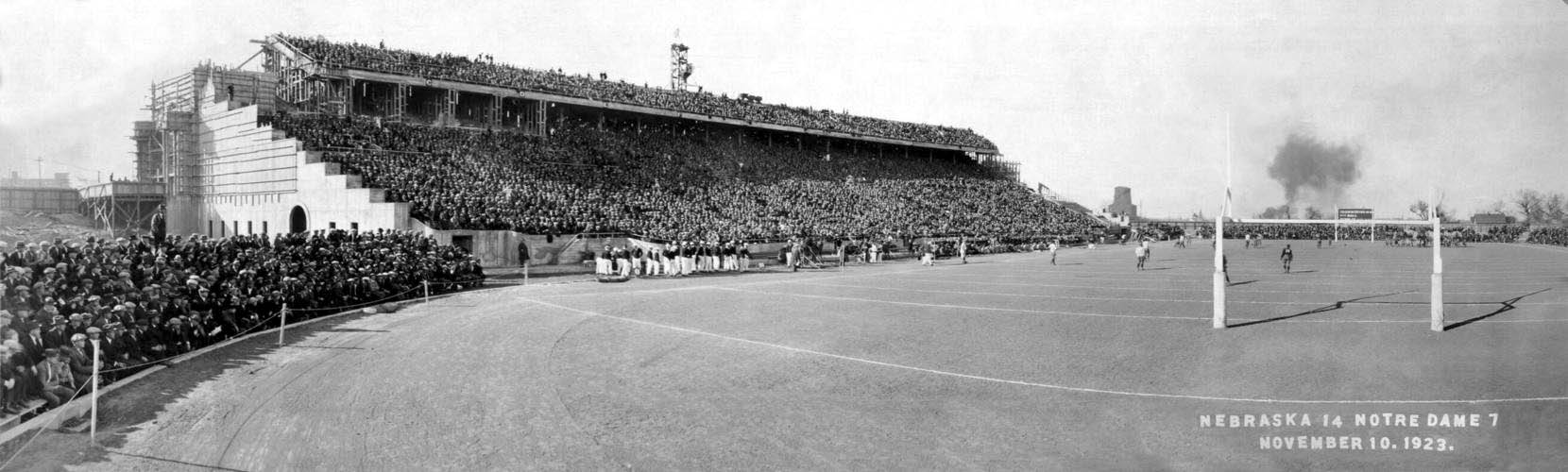
Notre Dame at Nebraska, November, 10 1923

Notre Dame at Nebraska

Team	1	2	3	4	Total
Notre Dame	0	0	0	7	7
• Nebraska	7	7	0	0	14

- Date: November 10
- Location: Memorial Stadium • Lincoln, Nebraska
- Game attendance: 30,000

Nebraska's season began rather weakly as the Cornhuskers managed to scrape up to a 1–1–2 record to date. Unsurprisingly, things looked grim for the home team as the undefeated Notre Dame team returned to Lincoln with a 6–0 record, having prevented all opponents from scoring more than a single touchdown in each game. The Four Horsemen of Notre Dame were looking to exact revenge for the defeat handed them by Nebraska the previous year. The game opened with Notre Dame shocked at their struggle to gain the upper hand. Nebraska scored once, and then again, going up 14–0 by halftime, stunning the crowd entirely – both those rooting for Notre Dame and for Nebraska. Knute Rockne finally managed to coach his team to a single fourth-quarter touchdown, but the day belonged to the Cornhuskers. For the second consecutive time, Nebraska handed the Four Horsemen a loss, which was also only the second time they had lost to any team. Notre Dame went on to win the next three games, finishing their season with just the one loss in Lincoln, again not allowing any of those other opponents more than 7 points per game. The Nebraska win caught them up with the Fighting Irish, to 4–4–1 all time.

=== Iowa State ===
Nebraska at Iowa State

Team	1	2	Total
• Nebraska			26
Iowa State			14

- Date: November 17
- Location: Clyde Williams Field • Ames, Iowa

Nebraska ran right out to a 26–0 lead, never seriously being challenged by Iowa State for most of the game despite a hard-fought and physical battle on the field. In the fourth quarter, however, injuries and substitutions disrupted the rhythm of the Cornhuskers, which allowed Iowa State to come to life and put in a late 14 points. Iowa State's record against Nebraska fell to 4–15–1.

=== Syracuse ===
Syracuse at Nebraska

Team	1	2	Total
• Syracuse			7
Nebraska			0

- Date: November 24
- Location: Memorial Stadium • Lincoln, Nebraska

Nebraska had some players still out from injury, while many who stayed in were slowed by various problems still carried since the Iowa State game. In another battle against a strong eastern team, both squads fought to a standstill for most of the game. Near the end, however, as in the previous week, the Cornhuskers began to bend and then finally allowed Syracuse a single touchdown, which was enough for to Syracuse to be the first visiting team to win in Nebraska's new stadium. Nebraska's frustration against the Orangemen was extended as they fell to 1–3 against Syracuse all time.

=== Kansas State ===
Kansas State at Nebraska

Team	1	2	Total
Kansas State			12
• Nebraska			34

- Date: November 29
- Location: Memorial Stadium • Lincoln, Nebraska

Nebraska found success in the final game of the season by controlling the time of the possession, with a punishing ground game that prevented Kansas State from opportunities to touch the ball. Although the final score implied a convincing win, the Kansas State squad threatened to score throughout the entire game when they were able to get the ball, and the outcome was not decided until late in the day. The Nebraska win extended the futility of the Kansas State squad in the series, as they remained winless in all eight games played to date.

== After the season ==
After two very successful seasons, coach Dawson's third year experienced a setback in the program's record, but still came away with several successes. Although Nebraska tied two conference games, they were also unbeaten in conference play and had one less tie game than Kansas, which handed Dawson his third consecutive league title. Bigger than that was the defeat of Notre Dame in Lincoln. Notre Dame was now undefeated for two consecutive seasons – except for the two losses handed down to them by the Cornhuskers. Coach Dawson's career record suffered from the relatively weak showing on the year, falling to 18–4–2 (.792) as the program's overall record slipped to 192–64–17 (.734). Nebraska's conference record also fell slightly, despite taking home the title again, to 35–3–4 (.881).
