= 1924 Missouri Tigers football team =

American college football season

1924 Missouri Tigers football

MVC champion

Los Angeles Christmas Festival, L 7–20 vs. USC
- Conference: Missouri Valley Conference
- Record: 7–2 (5–1 MVC)
- Head coach: Gwinn Henry (2nd season)
- Captain: Arthur D. Bond
- Home stadium: Rollins Field

1924 Missouri Valley Conference football standings
	Conf.					Overall
Team	W		L		T	W		L		T
No. 10 Missouri $	5	–	1	–	0	7	–	2	–	0
Nebraska	3	–	1	–	0	5	–	3	–	0
Drake	3	–	1	–	1	5	–	2	–	1
Grinnell	2	–	1	–	0	3	–	3	–	0
Iowa State	3	–	2	–	0	4	–	3	–	1
Oklahoma	2	–	3	–	1	2	–	5	–	1
Kansas	2	–	4	–	1	2	–	5	–	1
Kansas State	1	–	4	–	1	3	–	4	–	1
Washington University	0	–	4	–	0	4	–	4	–	0
$ – Conference champion; Rankings from Dickinson System

The 1924 Missouri Tigers football team was an American football team that represented the University of Missouri in the Missouri Valley Intercollegiate Athletic Association (Missouri Valley) during the 1924 college football season. The team compiled a 7–2 record (5–1 against Missouri Valley opponents), won the Missouri Valley championship, and outscored all opponents by a combined total of 110 to 41. Gwinn Henry was the head coach for the second of nine seasons. The team played its home games at Rollins Field in Columbia, Missouri.

== Schedule ==
Date	Opponent	Site	Result	Attendance	Source
October 4	at Chicago*	Stagg Field; Chicago, IL	W 3–0		
October 11	Missouri Wesleyan*	Rollins Field; Columbia, MO	W 14–0		
October 18	at Iowa State	State Field; Ames, IA (rivalry)	W 7–0		
October 25	Kansas State	Rollins Field; Columbia, MO	W 14–7		
November 1	at Nebraska	Memorial Stadium; Lincoln, NE (rivalry)	L 6–14		
November 8	at Oklahoma	Owen Field; Norman, OK (rivalry)	W 10–0		
November 15	Washington University	Rollins Field; Columbia, MO	W 35–0		
November 27	Kansas	Rollins Field; Columbia, MO (rivalry)	W 14–0		
December 25	at USC*	Los Angeles Memorial Coliseum; Los Angeles, CA (Christmas Festival)	L 7–20	47,000	
*Non-conference game
