= 1924 Drake Bulldogs football team =

American college football season

1924 Drake Bulldogs football
- Conference: Missouri Valley Conference
- Record: 5–2–1 (3–1–1 MVC)
- Head coach: Ossie Solem (4th season)
- Home stadium: Drake Stadium

1924 Missouri Valley Conference football standings
	Conf.					Overall
Team	W		L		T	W		L		T
No. 10 Missouri $	5	–	1	–	0	7	–	2	–	0
Nebraska	3	–	1	–	0	5	–	3	–	0
Drake	3	–	1	–	1	5	–	2	–	1
Grinnell	2	–	1	–	0	3	–	3	–	0
Iowa State	3	–	2	–	0	4	–	3	–	1
Oklahoma	2	–	3	–	1	2	–	5	–	1
Kansas	2	–	4	–	1	2	–	5	–	1
Kansas State	1	–	4	–	1	3	–	4	–	1
Washington University	0	–	4	–	0	4	–	4	–	0
$ – Conference champion; Rankings from Dickinson System

The 1924 Drake Bulldogs football team was an American football team that represented Drake University as a member of the Missouri Valley Conference (MVC) during the 1924 college football season. In its fourth season under head coach Ossie Solem, the team compiled a 5–2–1 record (3–1–1 against MVC opponents), placed third in the MVC, and outscored its opponents by a total of 106 to 56.

== Schedule ==
Date	Opponent	Site	Result	Attendance	Source
October 4	at Utah*	Cummings Field; Salt Lake City, UT	W 33–14		
October 11	Knox*	Drake Stadium; Des Moines, IA	W 19–10		
October 18	Grinnell	Drake Stadium; Des Moines, IA	W 13–0		
October 25	Oklahoma	Drake Stadium; Des Moines, IA	W 28–0		
November 8	Kansas	Drake Stadium; Des Moines, IA	T 6–6	> 7,000	
November 15	at Kansas State	Memorial Stadium; Manhattan, KS	W 7–6		
November 22	at Iowa State	State Field; Ames, IA	L 0–10		
November 27	at Florida*	Fleming Field; Gainesville, FL	L 0–10		
*Non-conference game
