= 1923 Kansas Jayhawks football team =

American college football season

1923 Kansas Jayhawks football

MVC co-champion
- Conference: Missouri Valley Conference
- Record: 5–0–3 (3–0–3 MVC)
- Head coach: Potsy Clark (3rd season)
- Captain: Charles Black
- Home stadium: Memorial Stadium

1923 Missouri Valley Conference football standings
	Conf.					Overall
Team	W		L		T	W		L		T
Kansas +	3	–	0	–	3	5	–	0	–	3
Nebraska +	3	–	0	–	2	4	–	2	–	2
Drake	3	–	1	–	0	5	–	2	–	0
Iowa State	3	–	2	–	1	4	–	3	–	1
Kansas State	2	–	2	–	2	4	–	2	–	2
Oklahoma	2	–	4	–	0	3	–	5	–	0
Missouri	1	–	3	–	2	2	–	3	–	3
Grinnell	1	–	3	–	0	2	–	6	–	0
Washington University	1	–	4	–	0	3	–	5	–	0
+ – Conference co-champions

The 1923 Kansas Jayhawks football team represented the University of Kansas in the Missouri Valley Conference (MVC) during the 1923 college football season. In their third season under head coach Potsy Clark, the Jayhawks compiled an overall record of 5–0–3 record with a mark of 3–0–3 against conference opponents, shared the MVC title with Nebraska, and were outscored by opponents by a combined total of 68 to 30. The season is, as of 2018, the last season the Jayhawks finished undefeated. They played their home games at Memorial Stadium in Lawrence, Kansas. Charles Black was the team captain.

== Schedule ==
Date	Opponent	Site	Result	Attendance	Source
October 6	Creighton*	Memorial Stadium; Lawrence, KS	W 6–0		
October 13	Oklahoma A&M*	Memorial Stadium; Lawrence, KS	W 9–0		
October 20	at Nebraska	Nebraska Field; Lincoln, NE (rivalry)	T 0–0		
October 27	Kansas State	Memorial Stadium; Lawrence, KS (rivalry)	T 0–0		
November 3	at Oklahoma	Owen Field; Norman, OK	W 7–3		
November 10	Washington University	Memorial Stadium; Lawrence, KS	W 83–0		
November 17	Drake	Memorial Stadium; Lawrence, KS	W 17–0		
November 29	Missouri^{†}	Memorial Stadium; Lawrence, KS (rivalry)	T 3–3	20,992	
*Non-conference game; ^{†}Homecoming
