= 1923 Arkansas Razorbacks football team =

American college football season

1923 Arkansas Razorbacks football
- Conference: Southwest Conference
- Record: 6–2–1 (2–2 SWC)
- Head coach: Francis Schmidt (2nd season)
- Captain: Sam Coleman
- Home stadium: The Hill

1923 Southwest Conference football standings
	Conf.					Overall
Team	W		L		T	W		L		T
SMU $	5	–	0	–	0	9	–	0	–	0
Texas	2	–	0	–	1	8	–	0	–	1
TCU	2	–	1	–	0	4	–	5	–	0
Baylor	1	–	1	–	2	5	–	1	–	2
Arkansas	2	–	2	–	0	6	–	2	–	1
Oklahoma A&M	1	–	3	–	0	2	–	8	–	0
Rice	1	–	4	–	0	3	–	5	–	0
Texas A&M	0	–	3	–	1	5	–	3	–	1
$ – Conference champion

The 1923 Arkansas Razorbacks football team represented the University of Arkansas in the Southwest Conference (SWC) during the 1923 college football season. In their second year under head coach Francis Schmidt, the Razorbacks compiled a 6–2–1 record (2–2 against SWC opponents), finished in fifth place in the SWC, and outscored their opponents by a combined total of 158 to 40.

== Schedule ==
Date	Opponent	Site	Result	Attendance	Source
September 29	Arkansas State Normal*	The Hill; Fayetteville, AR	W 32–0		
October 6	Drury*	The Hill; Fayetteville, AR	W 26–0		
October 13	Rice	Kavanaugh Field; Little Rock, AR	W 23–0		
October 20	Baylor	The Hill; Fayetteville, AR	L 0–14		
October 27	vs. LSU*	Fair Grounds; Shreveport, LA (rivalry)	W 26–13	5,000	
November 3	Ouachita*^{†}	The Hill; Fayetteville, AR	T 0–0		
November 10	at SMU	Fair Park Stadium; Dallas, TX	L 6–13		
November 23	at Phillips*	Athletic Park; Muskogee, OK	W 32–0	4,000	
November 28	vs. Oklahoma A&M	Andrews Field; Fort Smith, AR	W 13–0		
*Non-conference game; ^{†}Homecoming
