= 1922 Oklahoma A&M Aggies football team =

American college football season

1922 Oklahoma A&M Aggies football
- Conference: Southwest Conference, Oklahoma Intercollegiate Conference
- Record: 4–4–1 (2–3 SWC, 2–0 OIC)
- Head coach: John Maulbetsch (2nd season)
- Home stadium: Lewis Field

1922 Oklahoma Intercollegiate Conference football standings
	Conf.					Overall
Team	W		L		T	W		L		T
Phillips +	5	–	0	–	0	7	–	1	–	0
Tulsa +	4	–	0	–	0	8	–	0	–	0
Southeastern Oklahoma State +	3	–	1	–	0	7	–	1	–	1
Oklahoma A&M	2	–	0	–	0	4	–	4	–	1
Central State Teachers	5	–	3	–	0	7	–	4	–	0
Southwestern State	4	–	3	–	0	5	–	4	–	0
East Central	2	–	3	–	0	5	–	3	–	1
Northwestern Oklahoma State	1	–	4	–	1	3	–	4	–	1
Oklahoma Baptist	1	–	6	–	1	2	–	7	–	1
Oklahoma City	0	–	7	–	0	0	–	9	–	0
$ – Conference champion

1922 Southwest Conference football standings
	Conf.					Overall
Team	W		L		T	W		L		T
Baylor $	5	–	0	–	0	8	–	3	–	0
Texas	2	–	1	–	0	7	–	2	–	0
SMU	2	–	2	–	0	6	–	3	–	1
Texas A&M	2	–	2	–	0	5	–	4	–	1
Oklahoma A&M	2	–	3	–	0	4	–	4	–	1
Arkansas	1	–	3	–	0	4	–	5	–	0
Rice	1	–	4	–	0	4	–	4	–	0
$ – Conference champion

The 1922 Oklahoma A&M Aggies football team represented Oklahoma A&M College as a member of the Oklahoma Intercollegiate Conference (OIC) and the Southwest Conference (SWC) during the 1922 college football season. This was the 22nd year of football at A&M and the second under John Maulbetsch. The Aggies played their home games at Lewis Field in Stillwater, Oklahoma. They finished the season 4–4–1 overall, 2–0 in OIC play, and 2–3 in the SWC play.

== Schedule ==
Date	Time	Opponent	Site	Result	Attendance	Source
September 30		Northwestern Oklahoma State	Lewis Field; Stillwater, OK	W 49–0		
October 7		Central State Teachers	Lewis Field; Stillwater, OK	W 17–0	5,000	
October 14		at Texas	Clark Field; Austin, TX	L 7–19		
October 21		Rice	Lewis Field; Stillwater, OK	W 21–0		
October 28		at SMU	Fair Park Stadium; Dallas, TX	L 6–32		
November 4	3:00 p.m.	at TCU	Panther Park; Fort Worth, TX	L 14–22		
November 11		Tulsa	Lewis Field; Stillwater, OK (rivalry)	Cancelled†		
November 18		Baylor	Lewis Field; Stillwater, OK	L 0–10		
November 24		Oklahoma*^{†}	Lewis Field; Stillwater, OK (Bedlam)	T 3–3		
November 30		vs. Arkansas	Andrews Field; Fort Smith, AR	W 13–0		
*Non-conference game; ^{†}Homecoming; All times are in Central time

† Tulsa states "Mutually agreed not to play the game," while Oklahoma State deems this a "mutual forfeit."
