= 1923 Southwest Texas State Bobcats football team =

American college football season

1923 Southwest Texas State Bobcats football
- Conference: Texas Intercollegiate Athletic Association
- Record: 4–4 (3–4 TIAA)
- Head coach: Oscar W. Strahan (5th season)
- Home stadium: Evans Field

1923 Texas Intercollegiate Athletic Association football standings
	Conf.					Overall
Team	W		L		T	W		L		T
Austin $	4	–	0	–	1	7	–	2	–	1
Howard Payne	3	–	1	–	2	4	–	3	–	2
Simmons (TX)	2	–	1	–	2	3	–	5	–	2
Rice	2	–	1	–	0	3	–	5	–	0
Southwestern (TX)	2	–	1	–	1	2	–	5	–	1
North Texas State Teachers	3	–	2	–	0	3	–	5	–	0
Trinity (TX)	3	–	3	–	0	6	–	3	–	0
Sam Houston State	3	–	3	–	0	4	–	4	–	0
Southwest Texas State	3	–	4	–	0	4	–	4	–	0
West Texas State	1	–	3	–	0	4	–	4	–	1
East Texas State	1	–	4	–	0	2	–	6	–	0
Daniel Baker	1	–	5	–	0	1	–	6	–	0
$ – Conference champion

The 1923 Southwest Texas State Bobcats football team was an American football team that represented Southwest Texas State Teachers College (now known as Texas State University) during the 1923 college football season as a member of the Texas Intercollegiate Athletic Association (TIAA). In their fifth year under head coach Oscar W. Strahan, the team compiled an overall record of 4–4 with a mark of 3–4 in conference play.

== Schedule ==
Date	Opponent	Site	Result	Source
October 6	Stephen F. Austin*	Evans Field; San Marcos, TX	W 47–0	
October 12	Southwestern (TX)	Evans Field; San Marcos, TX	L 0–18	
October 20	at Sam Houston State	Pritchett Field; Huntsville, TX (rivalry)	L 0–6	
October 27	at Rice	Rice Field; Houston, TX	W 19–6	
November 3	East Texas State	Evans Field; San Marcos, TX	W 40–0	
November 12	at Howard Payne	Brownwood, TX	L 13–25	
November 23	at Daniel Baker	Brownwood, TX	W 31–0	
November 29	North Texas State Teachers	Evans Field; San Marcos, TX	L 7–12	
*Non-conference game
