= 1922 Texas A&M Aggies football team =

American college football season

1922 Texas A&M Aggies football
- Conference: Southwest Conference
- Record: 5–4 (2–2 SWC)
- Head coach: Dana X. Bible (5th season)
- Home stadium: Kyle Field

1922 Southwest Conference football standings
	Conf.					Overall
Team	W		L		T	W		L		T
Baylor $	5	–	0	–	0	8	–	3	–	0
Texas	2	–	1	–	0	7	–	2	–	0
SMU	2	–	2	–	0	6	–	3	–	1
Texas A&M	2	–	2	–	0	5	–	4	–	1
Oklahoma A&M	2	–	3	–	0	4	–	4	–	1
Arkansas	1	–	3	–	0	4	–	5	–	0
Rice	1	–	4	–	0	4	–	4	–	0
$ – Conference champion

The 1922 Texas A&M Aggies football team represented the Agricultural and Mechanical College of Texas—now known as Texas A&M University—as a member of the Southwest Conference (SWC) during the 1922 college football season. In their fifth year under head coach Dana X. Bible, the team compiled an overall record of 5–4, with a mark of 2–2 in conference play, and finished tied for third in the SWC.

== Schedule ==
Date	Opponent	Site	Result	Attendance	Source
September 29	Howard Payne*	Kyle Field; College Station, TX	L 7–13		
October 10	vs. Tulsa*	Fair Park Stadium; Dallas, TX	L 10–13		
October 14	Southwestern (TX)*	Kyle Field; College Station, TX	W 32–0		
October 20	LSU*	Kyle Field; College Station, TX (rivalry)	W 46–0		
October 27	Ouachita Baptist*	Kyle Field; College Station, TX	W 19–6		
November 4	at Baylor	Cotton Palace; Waco, TX (rivalry)	L 7–13		
November 11	at SMU	Fair Park Stadium; Dallas, TX	L 6–17	9,000	
November 18	Rice	Kyle Field; College Station, TX	W 24–0		
November 30	at Texas	Clark Field; Austin, TX (rivalry)	W 14–7	20,000	
*Non-conference game
