= 1922 North Texas State Normal Eagles football team =

American college football season

1922 North Texas State Normal Eagles football
- Conference: Texas Intercollegiate Athletic Association
- Record: 5–2–1 (3–0 TIAA)
- Head coach: Theron J. Fouts (3rd season)
- Home stadium: Eagle Field

1922 Texas Intercollegiate Athletic Association football standings
	Conf.					Overall
Team	W		L		T	W		L		T
Austin $	5	–	1	–	0	6	–	2	–	0
North Texas State Normal	3	–	0	–	0	5	–	2	–	1
Rice	1	–	0	–	0	4	–	4	–	0
Simmons (TX)	4	–	1	–	1	5	–	3	–	1
Howard Payne	4	–	2	–	1	6	–	2	–	1
Trinity (TX)	2	–	2	–	2	3	–	2	–	3
Southwestern (TX)	2	–	3	–	0	4	–	6	–	0
Daniel Baker	2	–	4	–	0	2	–	6	–	0
East Texas State	0	–	2	–	0	4	–	5	–	0
West Texas State	0	–	2	–	0	2	–	8	–	0
Southwest Texas State	0	–	3	–	0	3	–	3	–	0
TCU	0	–	3	–	2	2	–	5	–	3
$ – Conference champion

The 1922 North Texas State Normal Eagles football team was an American football team that represented the North Texas State Normal College (now known as the University of North Texas) during the 1923 college football season as a member of the Texas Intercollegiate Athletic Association (TIAA). In their third year under head coach Theron J. Fouts, the team compiled an overall record of 5–2–1 with a mark of 3–0 in conference play.

== Schedule ==
Date	Opponent	Site	Result	Attendance	Source
September 30	at Baylor*	Carroll Field; Waco, TX	L 0–55		
October 7	at SMU*	Armstrong Field; Dallas, TX (rivalry)	L 0–66		
October 20	at Burleson*	Greenville, TX	W 13–9		
October 27	at Grubbs Vocational*	Arlington, TX	T 7–7		
November 11	East Texas State	Eagle Field; Denton, TX	W 30–0	3,000	
November 17	Trinity (TX)	Eagle Field; Denton, TX	W 13–6		
November 23	Grubbs Vocational*	Eagle Field; Denton, TX	W 6–0		
November 30	Southwest Texas State	Eagle Field; Denton, TX	W 16–13		
*Non-conference game
