= 1923 Iowa State Cyclones football team =

American college football season

1923 Iowa State Cyclones football
- Conference: Missouri Valley Conference
- Record: 4–3–1 (3–2–1 MVC)
- Head coach: Sam Willaman (2nd season)
- Captain: Ira Young
- Home stadium: State Field

Uniform
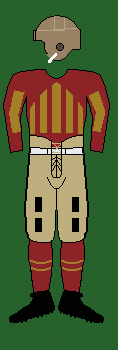

1923 Missouri Valley Conference football standings
	Conf.					Overall
Team	W		L		T	W		L		T
Kansas +	3	–	0	–	3	5	–	0	–	3
Nebraska +	3	–	0	–	2	4	–	2	–	2
Drake	3	–	1	–	0	5	–	2	–	0
Iowa State	3	–	2	–	1	4	–	3	–	1
Kansas State	2	–	2	–	2	4	–	2	–	2
Oklahoma	2	–	4	–	0	3	–	5	–	0
Missouri	1	–	3	–	2	2	–	3	–	3
Grinnell	1	–	3	–	0	2	–	6	–	0
Washington University	1	–	4	–	0	3	–	5	–	0
+ – Conference co-champions

The 1923 Iowa State Cyclones football team represented Iowa State College of Agricultural and Mechanic Arts (later renamed Iowa State University) in the Missouri Valley Conference during the 1923 college football season. In their second season under head coach Sam Willaman, the Cyclones compiled a 4–3–1 record (3–2–1 against conference opponents), finished in fourth place in the conference, and outscored opponents by a combined total of 121 to 93. They played their home games at State Field in Ames, Iowa. Ira Young was the team captain.

On October 8, two days after the Minnesota game, tackle Jack Trice died due to hemorrhaged lungs and internal bleeding stemming from injuries he sustained during the game.

== Schedule ==
Date	Time	Opponent	Site	Result	Attendance	Source
September 29	2:30 pm	Simpson*	State Field; Ames, IA	W 14–6		
October 6	2:30 pm	at Minnesota*	Northrop Field; Minneapolis, MN	L 17–20	12,000	
October 13	2:30 pm	at Missouri	Rollins Field; Columbia, MO (rivalry)	W 2–0		
October 20	2:15 pm	Kansas State	State Field; Ames, IA (rivalry)	T 7–7		
October 27	3:00 pm	at Washington University	Francis Field; St. Louis, MO	W 54–7	3,500	
November 3	2:00 pm	at Drake	Drake Stadium; Des Moines, IA	L 0–21		
November 17	2:30 pm	Nebraska^{†}	State Field; Ames, IA (rivalry)	L 14–26		
November 24	2:00 pm	Grinnell	State Field; Ames, IA	W 13–6		
*Non-conference game; ^{†}Homecoming; All times are in Central time

== Roster ==
1923 Iowa State Cyclones football roster
- 1 Ira Young – End (C)
- 2 Frederick J. Crawford – Halfback
- 3 Harry G. Neynesch – Halfback
- 4 Norton Behm – Halfback
- 5 Johnny Behm – Halfback
- 6 Cliff S. Cody – End
- 7 R. J. "Bob" Fisher – Halfback
- 8 Alvin Thornberg – Guard
- 9 Lyman A. Sanders – Halfback
- 11 Leonard T. Raff – Halfback
- 12 William "Bill" George – Halfback
- 13 William L. Nave – End
- 14 Guy T. Roberts – Quarterback
- 20 Jim E. Snyder – End
- 22 Claire M. "Win" Wingert – Fullback
- 25 Joe Anderson – Fullback
- 27 Herb P. Sindt – Center/Guard
- 28 Eugene "Swede" Larson – Guard
- 29 Charles K. Hill – Fullback
- 33 W. O. Cotter – Tackle
- 34 Harold S. Smith – Guard
- 36 Harry J. Schmidt – Guard
- 37 Jack Trice – Tackle
- 38 Cleal T. Watts – Tackle
- 39 John Buchanan – Guard
- 40 Frank F. "Tiny" Mayer – Tackle
- 41 William "Bill" Anderson – Fullback
- 42 John F. Travis – Guard
- 43 Roy W. "Shorty" Longstreet – Center
- 45 Walter C. Berger – Guard
- 53 Elmer A. Anderson – Guard
