= 1924 Kansas Jayhawks football team =

American college football season

1924 Kansas Jayhawks football
- Conference: Missouri Valley Conference
- Record: 2–5–1 (2–4–1 MVC)
- Head coach: Potsy Clark (4th season)
- Captain: Harold Burt
- Home stadium: Memorial Stadium

1924 Missouri Valley Conference football standings
	Conf.					Overall
Team	W		L		T	W		L		T
No. 10 Missouri $	5	–	1	–	0	7	–	2	–	0
Nebraska	3	–	1	–	0	5	–	3	–	0
Drake	3	–	1	–	1	5	–	2	–	1
Grinnell	2	–	1	–	0	3	–	3	–	0
Iowa State	3	–	2	–	0	4	–	3	–	1
Oklahoma	2	–	3	–	1	2	–	5	–	1
Kansas	2	–	4	–	1	2	–	5	–	1
Kansas State	1	–	4	–	1	3	–	4	–	1
Washington University	0	–	4	–	0	4	–	4	–	0
$ – Conference champion; Rankings from Dickinson System

The 1924 Kansas Jayhawks football team represented the University of Kansas in the Missouri Valley Conference during the 1924 college football season. In their fourth season under head coach Potsy Clark, the Jayhawks compiled a 2–5–1 record (2–4–1 against conference opponents), finished in seventh place in the conference, and were outscored by opponents by a combined total of 68 to 30. They played their home games at Memorial Stadium in Lawrence, Kansas. Harold Burt was the team captain.

== Schedule ==
Date	Time	Opponent	Site	Result	Attendance	Source
October 4		Oklahoma A&M*	Memorial Stadium; Lawrence, KS	L 0–3		
October 11		Iowa State	Memorial Stadium; Lawrence, KS	L 10–13		
October 18		at Kansas State	Ahearn Field; Manhattan, KS (Sunflower Showdown)	L 0–6		
October 25		Nebraska^{†}	Memorial Stadium; Lawrence, KS (rivalry)	L 7–14		
November 1	2:30 p.m.	at Washington University	Francis Field; St. Louis, MO	W 48–0	6,000	
November 8		at Drake	Drake Stadium; Des Moines, IA	T 6–6		
November 15		Oklahoma	Memorial Stadium; Lawrence, KS	W 20–0		
November 27		at Missouri	Rollins Field; Columbia, MO (Border War)	L 0–14		
*Non-conference game; ^{†}Homecoming; All times are in Central time
