= 1923 Sam Houston State Bearkats football team =

American college football season

1923 Sam Houston State Bearkats football
- Conference: Texas Intercollegiate Athletic Association
- Record: 4–4 (3–3 TIAA)
- Head coach: J. W. Jones (1st season)
- Home stadium: Pritchett Field

1923 Texas Intercollegiate Athletic Association football standings
| | Conf. | | | | | Overall |
| Team | W | | L | | T | W | | L | | T |
|---|---|---|---|---|---|---|---|---|---|---|
| Austin $ | 4 | – | 0 | – | 1 | 7 | – | 2 | – | 1 |
| Howard Payne | 3 | – | 1 | – | 2 | 4 | – | 3 | – | 2 |
| Simmons (TX) | 2 | – | 1 | – | 2 | 3 | – | 5 | – | 2 |
| Rice | 2 | – | 1 | – | 0 | 3 | – | 5 | – | 0 |
| Southwestern (TX) | 2 | – | 1 | – | 1 | 2 | – | 5 | – | 1 |
| North Texas State Teachers | 3 | – | 2 | – | 0 | 3 | – | 5 | – | 0 |
| Trinity (TX) | 3 | – | 3 | – | 0 | 6 | – | 3 | – | 0 |
| Sam Houston State | 3 | – | 3 | – | 0 | 4 | – | 4 | – | 0 |
| Southwest Texas State | 3 | – | 4 | – | 0 | 4 | – | 4 | – | 0 |
| West Texas State | 1 | – | 3 | – | 0 | 4 | – | 4 | – | 1 |
| East Texas State | 1 | – | 4 | – | 0 | 2 | – | 6 | – | 0 |
| Daniel Baker | 1 | – | 5 | – | 0 | 1 | – | 6 | – | 0 |
$ – Conference champion

The 1923 Sam Houston State Bearkats football team represented Sam Houston State Teachers College (now known as Sam Houston State University) as a member of the Texas Intercollegiate Athletic Association (TIAA) during the 1923 college football season. Led by first-year head coach J. W. Jones, the Bearkats compiled an overall record of 4–4 with a mark of 3–3 in conference play, and finished tied for seventh place in the TIAA.

== Schedule ==
| Date | Opponent | Site | Result | Source |
|---|---|---|---|---|
| September 22 | at Texas A&M* | Kyle Field; College Station, TX | L 0–53 | |
| October 6 | at Rice | Rice Field; Houston, TX | L 0–10 | |
| October 20 | Southwest Texas State | Pritchett Field; Huntsville, TX (rivalry) | W 6–0 | |
| October 27 | East Texas State | Pritchett Field; Huntsville, TX | W 16–0 | |
| November 3 | at Southwestern (TX) | Snyder Field; Georgetown, TX | L 0–21 | |
| November 10 | at North Texas State | Eagle Field; Denton, TX | L 6–18 | |
| November 17 | Stephen F. Austin* | Pritchett Field; Huntsville, TX (rivalry) | W 19–6 | |
| November 29 | at Daniel Baker | Brownwood, TX | W 21–18 | |
*Non-conference game
