= 1922 Arkansas Razorbacks football team =

American college football season

1922 Arkansas Razorbacks football
- Conference: Southwest Conference
- Record: 4–5 (1–3 SWC)
- Head coach: Francis Schmidt (1st season)
- Captain: Clarence Smith
- Home stadium: The Hill

1922 Southwest Conference football standings
	Conf.					Overall
Team	W		L		T	W		L		T
Baylor $	5	–	0	–	0	8	–	3	–	0
Texas	2	–	1	–	0	7	–	2	–	0
SMU	2	–	2	–	0	6	–	3	–	1
Texas A&M	2	–	2	–	0	5	–	4	–	1
Oklahoma A&M	2	–	3	–	0	4	–	4	–	1
Arkansas	1	–	3	–	0	4	–	5	–	0
Rice	1	–	4	–	0	4	–	4	–	0
$ – Conference champion

The 1922 Arkansas Razorbacks football team represented the University of Arkansas in the Southwest Conference (SWC) during the 1922 college football season. In their first year under head coach Francis Schmidt, the Razorbacks compiled a 4–5 record (1–3 against SWC opponents), finished in sixth place in the SWC, and outscored their opponents by a combined total of 143 to 136.

== Schedule ==
Date	Opponent	Site	Result	Source
September 30	Hendrix*	The Hill; Fayetteville, AR	W 39–0	
October 7	Drury*	The Hill; Fayetteville, AR	W 22–0	
October 14	Ouachita*	Kavanaugh Field; Little Rock, AR	L 7–13	
October 21	at Baylor	Cotton Palace; Waco, TX	L 13–60	
October 28	vs. LSU*	Fair Grounds; Shreveport, LA (rivalry)	W 40–6	
November 4	Tulsa*	The Hill; Fayetteville, AR	L 6–13	
November 11	at Rice	Rice Field; Houston, TX	L 7–31	
November 18	SMU^{†}	The Hill; Fayetteville, AR	W 9–0	
November 30	vs. Oklahoma A&M	Andrews Field; Fort Smith, AR	L 0–13	
*Non-conference game; ^{†}Homecoming
