= 1923 Oklahoma A&M Aggies football team =

American college football season

1923 Oklahoma A&M Aggies football
- Conference: Southwest Conference
- Record: 2–8 (1–3 SWC)
- Head coach: John Maulbetsch (3rd season)
- Home stadium: Lewis Field

1923 Southwest Conference football standings
	Conf.					Overall
Team	W		L		T	W		L		T
SMU $	5	–	0	–	0	9	–	0	–	0
Texas	2	–	0	–	1	8	–	0	–	1
TCU	2	–	1	–	0	4	–	5	–	0
Baylor	1	–	1	–	2	5	–	1	–	2
Arkansas	2	–	2	–	0	6	–	2	–	1
Oklahoma A&M	1	–	3	–	0	2	–	8	–	0
Rice	1	–	4	–	0	3	–	5	–	0
Texas A&M	0	–	3	–	1	5	–	3	–	1
$ – Conference champion

The 1923 Oklahoma A&M Aggies football team represented Oklahoma A&M College in the 1923 college football season. This was the 20th year of football at A&M and the third under John Maulbetsch. The Aggies played their home games at Lewis Field in Stillwater, Oklahoma. They finished the season 2–8, 1–3 in the Southwest Conference.

== Schedule ==
Date	Opponent	Site	Result	Source
September 29	at Iowa*	Iowa Field; Iowa City, IA	L 0–20	
October 6	TCU	Lewis Field; Stillwater, OK	L 6–7	
October 13	at Kansas*	Memorial Stadium; Lawrence, KS	L 0–9	
October 20	at Rice	Rice Field; Houston, TX	W 13–0	
October 27	at Oklahoma*	Boyd Field; Norman, OK (Bedlam)	L 0–12	
November 3	Phillips*	Lewis Field; Stillwater, OK	W 13–0	
November 10	Central State Teachers*	Lewis Field; Stillwater, OK	L 6–14	
November 17	at SMU	Ownby Oval; Dallas, TX	L 0–9	
November 24	Creighton*^{†}	Lewis Field; Stillwater, OK	L 2–13	
November 28	vs. Arkansas	Andrews Field; Fort Smith, AR	L 0–13	
*Non-conference game; ^{†}Homecoming
