= 1924 Kansas State Wildcats football team =

American college football season

1924 Kansas State Wildcats football
- Conference: Missouri Valley Conference
- Record: 3–4–1 (1–4–1 MVC)
- Head coach: Charlie Bachman (5th season)
- Offensive scheme: Notre Dame Box
- Captain: Lyle Munn
- Home stadium: Memorial Stadium

1924 Missouri Valley Conference football standings
	Conf.					Overall
Team	W		L		T	W		L		T
No. 10 Missouri $	5	–	1	–	0	7	–	2	–	0
Nebraska	3	–	1	–	0	5	–	3	–	0
Drake	3	–	1	–	1	5	–	2	–	1
Grinnell	2	–	1	–	0	3	–	3	–	0
Iowa State	3	–	2	–	0	4	–	3	–	1
Oklahoma	2	–	3	–	1	2	–	5	–	1
Kansas	2	–	4	–	1	2	–	5	–	1
Kansas State	1	–	4	–	1	3	–	4	–	1
Washington University	0	–	4	–	0	4	–	4	–	0
$ – Conference champion; Rankings from Dickinson System

The 1924 Kansas State Wildcats football team represented Kansas State Agricultural College in the 1924 college football season.

== Schedule ==
Date	Opponent	Site	Result
October 3	at Washburn*	Topeka, KS	W 23–0
October 10	Kansas State Teachers*	Memorial Stadium; Manhattan, KS	W 19–6
October 18	Kansas	Memorial Stadium; Manhattan, KS (rivalry)	W 6–0
October 25	at Missouri	Rollins Field; Columbia, MO	L 7–14
November 1	Iowa State	Memorial Stadium; Manhattan, KS (rivalry)	L 0–21
November 15	Drake	Memorial Stadium; Manhattan, KS	L 6–7
November 22	Nebraska^{†}	Memorial Stadium; Manhattan, KS (rivalry)	L 0–24
November 26	at Oklahoma	Oklahoma Memorial Stadium; Norman, OK	T 7–7
*Non-conference game; ^{†}Homecoming
