= 1923 Washington University Pikers football team =

American college football season

1923 Washington University Pikers football
- Conference: Missouri Valley Conference
- Record: 3–5 (1–4 MVC)
- Head coach: Byron Wimberly (1st season)
- Home stadium: Francis Field

1923 Missouri Valley Conference football standings
| | Conf. | | | | | Overall |
| Team | W | | L | | T | W | | L | | T |
|---|---|---|---|---|---|---|---|---|---|---|
| Kansas + | 3 | – | 0 | – | 3 | 5 | – | 0 | – | 3 |
| Nebraska + | 3 | – | 0 | – | 2 | 4 | – | 2 | – | 2 |
| Drake | 3 | – | 1 | – | 0 | 5 | – | 2 | – | 0 |
| Iowa State | 3 | – | 2 | – | 1 | 4 | – | 3 | – | 1 |
| Kansas State | 2 | – | 2 | – | 2 | 4 | – | 2 | – | 2 |
| Oklahoma | 2 | – | 4 | – | 0 | 3 | – | 5 | – | 0 |
| Missouri | 1 | – | 3 | – | 2 | 2 | – | 3 | – | 3 |
| Grinnell | 1 | – | 3 | – | 0 | 2 | – | 6 | – | 0 |
| Washington University | 1 | – | 4 | – | 0 | 3 | – | 5 | – | 0 |
+ – Conference co-champions

The 1923 Washington University Pikers football team represented Washington University in St. Louis as a member of the Missouri Valley Conference (MVC) during the 1923 college football season. Led by first-year head coach Byron Wimberly, the Pikers compiled an overall record of 3–5 with a mark of 1–4 in conference play, placing last out of nine teams in the MVC. Washington University played home games at Francis Field in St. Louis.

== Schedule ==
| Date | Time | Opponent | Site | Result | Attendance | Source |
|---|---|---|---|---|---|---|
| October 6 | | Missouri Mines* | Francis Field; St. Louis, MO | W 7–0 | | |
| October 13 | 3:00 p.m. | Grinnell | Francis Field; St. Louis, MO | L 2–16 | | |
| October 20 | 2:30 p.m. | at Oklahoma | Owen Field; Norman, OK | L 7–62 | | |
| October 27 | 3:00 p.m. | Iowa State | Francis Field; St. Louis, MO | L 7–54 | 3,500 | |
| November 3 | 2:30 p.m. | Drury* | Francis Field; St. Louis, MO | W 6–0 | | |
| November 10 | | at Kansas | Memorial Stadium; Lawrence, KS | L 0–83 | | |
| November 17 | 2:30 p.m. | Missouri | Francis Field; St. Louis, MO | L 13–7 | 9,000 | |
| November 29 | | at Tulane* | Tulane Stadium; New Orleans, LA | L 8–19 | 3,000 | |
*Non-conference game; All times are in Central time
