= 1923 Drake Bulldogs football team =

American college football season

1923 Drake Bulldogs football
- Conference: Missouri Valley Conference
- Record: 5–2 (3–1 MVC)
- Head coach: Ossie Solem (3rd season)
- Home stadium: Drake Stadium

1923 Missouri Valley Conference football standings
	Conf.					Overall
Team	W		L		T	W		L		T
Kansas +	3	–	0	–	3	5	–	0	–	3
Nebraska +	3	–	0	–	2	4	–	2	–	2
Drake	3	–	1	–	0	5	–	2	–	0
Iowa State	3	–	2	–	1	4	–	3	–	1
Kansas State	2	–	2	–	2	4	–	2	–	2
Oklahoma	2	–	4	–	0	3	–	5	–	0
Missouri	1	–	3	–	2	2	–	3	–	3
Grinnell	1	–	3	–	0	2	–	6	–	0
Washington University	1	–	4	–	0	3	–	5	–	0
+ – Conference co-champions

The 1923 Drake Bulldogs football team was an American football team that represented Drake University as a member of the Missouri Valley Conference (MVC) during the 1923 college football season. In its third season under head coach Ossie Solem, the team compiled a 5–2 record (3–1 against MVC opponents), placed third in the MVC, and outscored its opponents by a total of 168 to 49.

Halfback Bill Boelter was the team captain. Other key players included quarterback Sam Orebaugh.

== Schedule ==
Date	Opponent	Site	Result	Attendance	Source
October 6	Cornell (IA)*	Drake Stadium; Des Moines, IA	W 20–0		
October 13	Missouri Mines*	Drake Stadium; Des Moines, IA	W 54–0		
October 27	at Grinnell	Grinnell, IA	W 41–0		
November 3	Iowa State	Drake Stadium; Des Moines, IA	W 21–0	11,000	
November 10	Coe*	Drake Stadium; Des Moines, IA	L 6–12		
November 17	at Kansas	Memorial Stadium; Lawrence, KS	L 0–17		
November 29	at Oklahoma	Owen Field; Norman, OK	W 26–20		
*Non-conference game
