= 1924 Nebraska Cornhuskers football team =

American college football season

1924 Nebraska Cornhuskers football
- Conference: Missouri Valley Conference
- Record: 5–3 (3–1 MVC)
- Head coach: Fred Dawson (4th season)
- Captain: Ed Weir
- Home stadium: Memorial Stadium

1924 Missouri Valley Conference football standings
	Conf.					Overall
Team	W		L		T	W		L		T
No. 10 Missouri $	5	–	1	–	0	7	–	2	–	0
Nebraska	3	–	1	–	0	5	–	3	–	0
Drake	3	–	1	–	1	5	–	2	–	1
Grinnell	2	–	1	–	0	3	–	3	–	0
Iowa State	3	–	2	–	0	4	–	3	–	1
Oklahoma	2	–	3	–	1	2	–	5	–	1
Kansas	2	–	4	–	1	2	–	5	–	1
Kansas State	1	–	4	–	1	3	–	4	–	1
Washington University	0	–	4	–	0	4	–	4	–	0
$ – Conference champion; Rankings from Dickinson System

The 1924 Nebraska Cornhuskers football team was an American football team that represented the University of Nebraska in the Missouri Valley Conference (MVC) during the 1924 college football season. In its fourth and final season under head coach Fred Dawson, the team compiled a 5–3 record (3–1 against conference opponents), finished second in the MVC, and outscored opponents by a total of 118 to 77. The team played its home games at Memorial Stadium in Lincoln, Nebraska.

== Before the season ==
Despite a bit of a performance dropoff last season, compared to 1921 and 1922, Nebraska was still riding on a wave of success: Three straight conference titles, two straight defeats of Notre Dame's Four Horsemen (which were also Notre Dame's only losses over the past two seasons), and a modern, new stadium to play their games in. Coach Dawson was returning for his fourth year, which met or exceeded the length of tenure of all but two of the fifteen coaches preceding him.

== Schedule ==
Date	Time	Opponent	Site	Result	Attendance	Source
October 4	2:00 p.m.	Illinois*	Memorial Stadium; Lincoln, NE	L 6–9	25,000	
October 11	2:30 p.m.	at Oklahoma	Owen Field; Norman, OK (rivalry)	L 7–14		
October 18	2:00 p.m.	Colgate*^{†}	Memorial Stadium; Lincoln, NE	W 35–7	20,000	
October 25	2:30 p.m.	at Kansas	Memorial Stadium; Lawrence, KS (rivalry)	W 14–7		
November 1	2:00 p.m.	Missouri	Memorial Stadium; Lincoln, NE (rivalry)	W 14–6		
November 15	2:00 p.m.	at Notre Dame*	Cartier Field; Notre Dame, IN (rivalry)	L 6–34	26,000	
November 22	2:00 p.m.	at Kansas State	Memorial Stadium; Manhattan, KS (rivalry)	W 24–0		
November 27	2:00 p.m.	Oregon Agricultural*	Memorial Stadium; Lincoln, NE	W 14–0		
*Non-conference game; ^{†}Homecoming; All times are in Central time

== Roster ==
Bloodgood, Elbert QB; Bronson, Willard QB; Burnham, Willard E Collins, Melvin E Dailey, Frank FB; DuTeau G Ford, Gail PLAYER; Ford, Norman PLAYER; Grow, Lloyd C Hubka, Ladimer E Hutchinson, Harold C Kamm, Paul PLAYER; Kriemelmeyer, Walter T Locke, Roland HB; Mandery, Avard HB	Mandery, Roy E Mielenz, Frank HB; Molzen, Cecil G Myers, Douglas FB; Ogden, Warren G Pospisil, Frank G Rhodes, John HB; Robertson, Rob E Scholz, Walter RG; Swearingen, Joe PLAYER; Thomsen, Fred E Weir, Ed T Weir, Joe E Wostoupel, Joseph E

== Coaching staff ==
Coach	Position	First year	Alma mater
Fred Dawson	Head coach	1921	Princeton
Henry Schulte	Line coach	1921	Michigan
Owen Frank	Backfield coach	1921	Nebraska
Bill Day	Centers coach	1921	Nebraska
Leo Sherer	Ends coach	1923	Nebraska
William G. Kline		1924	Illinois
Stemen	Manager		
Gish	Assistant manager		

== Game summaries ==
=== Illinois ===
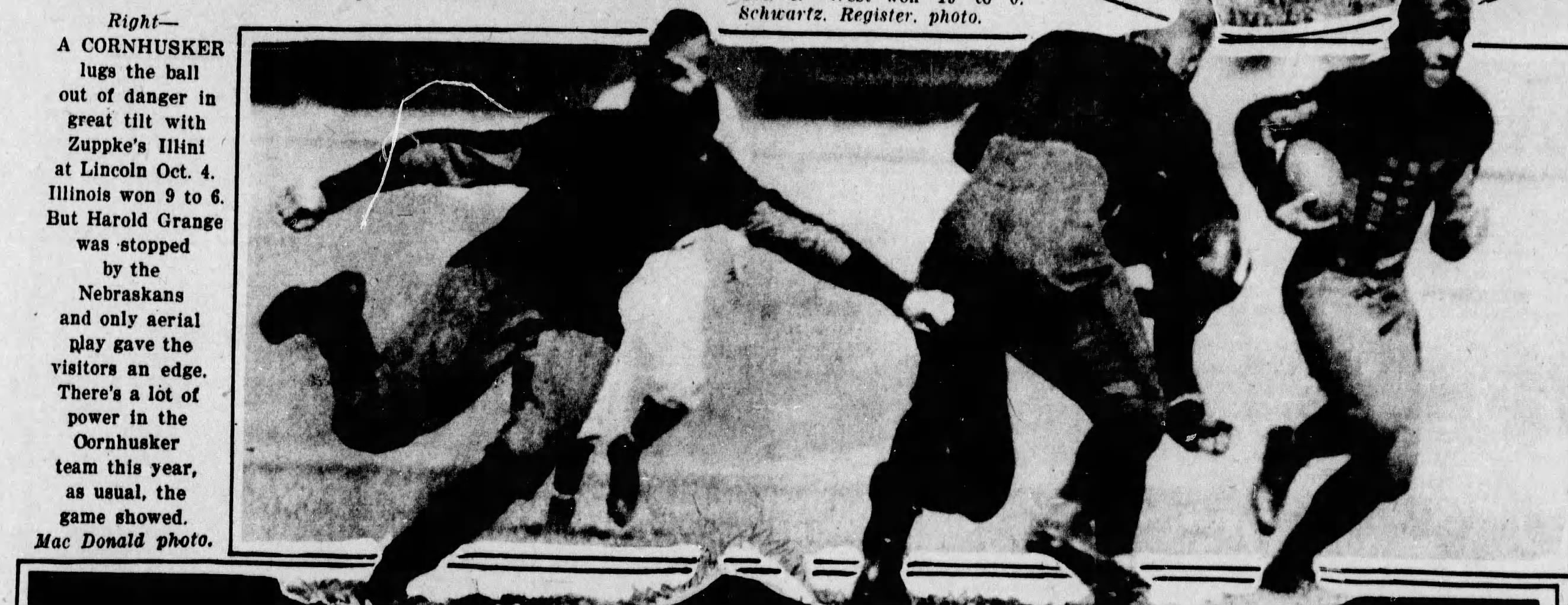
A Cornhusker running the ball in the game vs. Illinois

Illinois at Nebraska

Team	1	2	Total
• Illinois			9
Nebraska			6

- Date: October 4
- Location: Memorial Stadium • Lincoln, Nebraska
- Game attendance: 25,000

Nebraska brought Big 10 co-champion Illinois to Lincoln with aims to make up for losing in Champaign last year. The game plan focused on stopping Red Grange, who ran all over the Cornhuskers for three touchdowns last year. The plan was a success, and Grange was mostly neutralized. Both teams scored early before shutting each other down, and the 6–6 tie continued until late in the fourth quarter. Finally, Illinois managed a field goal to escape Lincoln with a narrow victory, and narrowed the gap in their series with Nebraska to 2–4.

=== Oklahoma ===
Nebraska at Oklahoma

Team	1	2	Total
Nebraska			7
• Oklahoma			14

- Date: October 11
- Location: Oklahoma Memorial Stadium • Norman, Oklahoma

The Cornhuskers still had some confidence coming into this game; after the strong showing against the powerhouse Illinois team last week, the Sooners were the better-prepared team this day, they shut down every aspect of Nebraska's efforts and went ahead 14–0 by the half. The Cornhuskers tried to recover later in the game but could only come up with 7, and dropped their first game ever to Oklahoma in five meetings.

=== Colgate ===
Colgate at Nebraska

Team	1	2	Total
Colgate			7
• Nebraska			35

- Date: October 18
- Location: Memorial Stadium • Lincoln, Nebraska
- Game attendance: 20,000

Nebraska was awakened by the stunning loss to Oklahoma and came to life when Colgate came calling at Memorial Stadium as one of the season's eastern opponents. The Raiders were outplayed and outclassed in nearly every aspect of the game, and the Cornhuskers sent Colgate home in disappointment. This was the only game ever played between these programs.

=== Kansas ===
Nebraska at Kansas

Team	1	2	3	4	Total
• Nebraska	0	0	14	0	14
Kansas	0	0	0	7	7

- Date: October 25
- Location: Memorial Stadium • Lawrence, Kansas

One of the oldest series in Nebraska history was continued when the Cornhuskers arrived in Lawrence to battle the Jayhawks. For the entire first half, both teams held each other off, but Kansas finally was overcome in the second half. The string of frustration that Kansas had endured, never yet winning a home game against Nebraska, was continued yet another year as Kansas fell farther behind in the series to 9–20–2.

=== Missouri ===
Missouri at Nebraska

Team	1	2	3	4	Total
Missouri	6	0	0	0	6
• Nebraska	0	7	0	7	14

- Date: November 1
- Location: Memorial Stadium • Lincoln, Nebraska

In one of the most challenging games of the season, Nebraska battled back from an early deficit to topple Missouri in Lincoln. The Cornhuskers struggled with the Missouri onslaught for most of the first half but somehow kept the Tigers from putting much on the scoreboard for the rest of the game while tacking on some touchdowns of their own. Although the Tigers went on to win the conference championship, the Cornhuskers were able to lay claim to being the only conference team to hand Missouri a loss, which extended Nebraska's series lead to 14–3–1.

=== Notre Dame ===
Nebraska at Notre Dame

Team	1	2	3	4	Total
Nebraska	6	0	0	0	6
• Notre Dame	0	14	14	6	34

- Date: November 15
- Location: Carter Field • Notre Dame, Indiana

The series between these teams was becoming legendary, and Knute Rockne's unbeaten Fighting Irish had been waiting all year to avenge their only two losses of the previous two season, both delivered by Nebraska. It was the final season for the Four Horsemen of Notre Dame, and Nebraska was the one trophy they had yet to win. Initially it appeared to the Fighting Irish that Nebraska still had their number, as the Cornhuskers jumped to a 6–0 lead in the first quarter. Following that score, however, Notre Dame focused on shutting down star tackle Ed Weir in order to put points up, and the plan worked as they were able to score 34 straight unanswered points to end Nebraska's winning streak and finally grant the Horsemen a win against the only team ever to defeat them in their entire college careers. Notre Dame took the series lead. 5–4–1.

=== Kansas State ===
Nebraska at Kansas State

Team	1	2	Total
• Nebraska			24
Kansas State			0

- Date: November 22
- Location: Memorial Stadium • Manhattan, Kansas

The Cornhuskers bounced right back from the trouncing delivered by Notre Dame, as they easily handled Kansas State in Manhattan and held them to no points on the day. The Aggies attempted to find success by emulating the playing styles used by the Fighting Irish to success against Nebraska to no avail, and remained winless in all nine games played between these teams.

=== Oregon State ===
Oregon State at Nebraska

Team	1	2	3	4	Total
Oregon State	0	0	0	0	0
• Nebraska	0	0	0	14	14

- Date: November 27
- Location: Memorial Stadium • Lincoln, Nebraska

Oregon State traveled a great distance for this Thanksgiving Day contest, and put up quite a fight against the Cornhuskers. After three quarters, both teams still stood without a score, but Nebraska finally broke through in the fourth quarter and managed two touchdowns to silence the visitors, holding them scoreless until the end. This was the second time these teams had met, the previous contest a 1916 game in Portland, both victories for Nebraska.

== After the season ==
Nebraska and Missouri both ended the season with just a single loss in conference play, and Missouri's only conference loss was dealt to them by the Cornhuskers, however Missouri played more conference games on the season and collected five league wins compared to Nebraska's three, resulting in Missouri claiming the conference title for 1924. Coach Dawson's final season with Nebraska brought his four-year record to 23–7–2 (.750), a bit of a disappointment from his first two seasons that each had a winning percentage of .875, but his tenure was nonetheless one of a winning coach. The program's record fell to 197–67–17 (.734), and the conference record fell to 38–4–4 (.870). Nebraska soon found a new coach, hiring assistant Ernest Bearg from Illinois, who had defeated Nebraska in this and the previous season under the leadership of Robert Zuppke.
