= 1923 Missouri Tigers football team =

American college football season

1923 Missouri Tigers football
- Conference: Missouri Valley Conference
- Record: 2–3–3 (1–3–2 MVC)
- Head coach: Gwinn Henry (1st season)
- Captain: Clyde Smith
- Home stadium: Rollins Field

1923 Missouri Valley Conference football standings
| | Conf. | | | | | Overall |
| Team | W | | L | | T | W | | L | | T |
|---|---|---|---|---|---|---|---|---|---|---|
| Kansas + | 3 | – | 0 | – | 3 | 5 | – | 0 | – | 3 |
| Nebraska + | 3 | – | 0 | – | 2 | 4 | – | 2 | – | 2 |
| Drake | 3 | – | 1 | – | 0 | 5 | – | 2 | – | 0 |
| Iowa State | 3 | – | 2 | – | 1 | 4 | – | 3 | – | 1 |
| Kansas State | 2 | – | 2 | – | 2 | 4 | – | 2 | – | 2 |
| Oklahoma | 2 | – | 4 | – | 0 | 3 | – | 5 | – | 0 |
| Missouri | 1 | – | 3 | – | 2 | 2 | – | 3 | – | 3 |
| Grinnell | 1 | – | 3 | – | 0 | 2 | – | 6 | – | 0 |
| Washington University | 1 | – | 4 | – | 0 | 3 | – | 5 | – | 0 |
+ – Conference co-champions

The 1923 Missouri Tigers football team was an American football team that represented the University of Missouri in the Missouri Valley Intercollegiate Athletic Association (Missouri Valley) during the 1923 college football season. The team compiled a 2–3–3 record (1–3–2 against Missouri Valley opponents), finished in eighth place in the Missouri Valley conference, and was outscored by all opponents by a combined total of 40 to 31. Gwinn Henry was the head coach for the first of nine seasons. The team played its home games at Rollins Field in Columbia, Missouri.

== Schedule ==
| Date | Time | Opponent | Site | Result | Attendance | Source |
|---|---|---|---|---|---|---|
| October 6 | | Southwest Missouri State* | Rollins Field; Columbia, MO | W 10–0 | | |
| October 13 | | Iowa State | Rollins Field; Columbia, MO (rivalry) | L 0–2 | | |
| October 20 | | at Saint Louis* | Sportsman's Park; St. Louis, MO | T 0–0 | 8,000–10,000 | |
| October 27 | | Nebraska | Rollins Field; Columbia, M (rivalry) | T 7–7 | | |
| November 3 | | at Kansas State | Memorial Stadium; Manhattan, KS | W 4–2 | | |
| November 10 | | Oklahoma | Rollins Field; Columbia, MO (rivalry) | L 0–13 | | |
| November 17 | 2:30 p.m. | at Washington University | Francis Field; St. Louis, MO | L 7–13 | 9,000 | |
| November 29 | | at Kansas | Memorial Stadium; Lawrence, KS (rivalry) | T 3–3 | 20,992 | |
*Non-conference game; All times are in Central time
