= 1923 Kansas State Wildcats football team =

American college football season

1923 Kansas State Wildcats football
- Conference: Missouri Valley Conference
- Record: 4–2–2 (2–2–2 MVC)
- Head coach: Charlie Bachman (4th season)
- Offensive scheme: Notre Dame Box
- Home stadium: Memorial Stadium

1923 Missouri Valley Conference football standings
	Conf.					Overall
Team	W		L		T	W		L		T
Kansas +	3	–	0	–	3	5	–	0	–	3
Nebraska +	3	–	0	–	2	4	–	2	–	2
Drake	3	–	1	–	0	5	–	2	–	0
Iowa State	3	–	2	–	1	4	–	3	–	1
Kansas State	2	–	2	–	2	4	–	2	–	2
Oklahoma	2	–	4	–	0	3	–	5	–	0
Missouri	1	–	3	–	2	2	–	3	–	3
Grinnell	1	–	3	–	0	2	–	6	–	0
Washington University	1	–	4	–	0	3	–	5	–	0
+ – Conference co-champions

The 1923 Kansas State Wildcats football team represented Kansas State Agricultural College in the 1923 college football season.

== Schedule ==
Date	Opponent	Site	Result
October 5	Washburn*	Memorial Stadium; Manhattan, KS	W 25–0
October 13	Creighton*	Memorial Stadium; Manhattan, KS	W 6–0
October 20	at Iowa State	State Field; Ames, IA (rivalry)	T 7–7
October 27	at Kansas	Memorial Stadium; Lawrence, KS (rivalry)	T 0–0
November 3	Missouri^{†}	Memorial Stadium; Manhattan, KS	L 2–4
November 10	at Grinnell	Grinnell, IA	W 34–7
November 23	Oklahoma	Memorial Stadium; Manhattan, KS	W 21–20
November 29	Nebraska	Memorial Stadium; Lincoln, NE (rivalry)	L 12–34
*Non-conference game; ^{†}Homecoming
