= 1923 Oklahoma Sooners football team =

American college football season

1923 Oklahoma Sooners football
- Conference: Missouri Valley Conference
- Record: 3–5 (2–4 MVC)
- Head coach: Bennie Owen (19th season)
- Offensive scheme: Single-wing
- Captain: Pete Hammert
- Home stadium: Owen Field

1923 Missouri Valley Conference football standings
	Conf.					Overall
Team	W		L		T	W		L		T
Kansas +	3	–	0	–	3	5	–	0	–	3
Nebraska +	3	–	0	–	2	4	–	2	–	2
Drake	3	–	1	–	0	5	–	2	–	0
Iowa State	3	–	2	–	1	4	–	3	–	1
Kansas State	2	–	2	–	2	4	–	2	–	2
Oklahoma	2	–	4	–	0	3	–	5	–	0
Missouri	1	–	3	–	2	2	–	3	–	3
Grinnell	1	–	3	–	0	2	–	6	–	0
Washington University	1	–	4	–	0	3	–	5	–	0
+ – Conference co-champions

The 1923 Oklahoma Sooners football team represented the University of Oklahoma as a member of the Missouri Valley Conference (MVC) during the 1923 college football season. In their 19th season under head coach Bennie Owen, the Sooners compiled an overall record of 3–5 with a mark of 2–4 in conference play, placing seventh in the MVC, and outscored opponents by a combined total of 144 to 111.

No Sooners were recognized as All-Americans, and end King Price was the only Sooner to receive all-conference honors.

== Schedule ==
Date	Time	Opponent	Site	Result	Source
October 13		at Nebraska	Memorial Stadium; Lincoln, NE (rivalry)	L 0–24	
October 20	2:30 p.m.	Washington University	Owen Field; Norman, OK	W 62–7	
October 27		Oklahoma A&M*	Owen Field; Norman, OK (Bedlam)	W 12–0	
November 3		Kansas	Owen Field; Norman, OK	L 3–7	
November 10		at Missouri	Rollins Field; Columbia, MO (rivalry)	W 13–0	
November 17		at Texas*	Clark Field; Austin, TX (rivalry)	L 14–26	
November 24		at Kansas State	Memorial Stadium; Manhattan, KS	L 20–21	
November 29		Drake	Owen Field; Norman, OK	L 20–26	
*Non-conference game; All times are in Central time
