= Byron Wimberly =

American football player and sports coach (1892–1956)

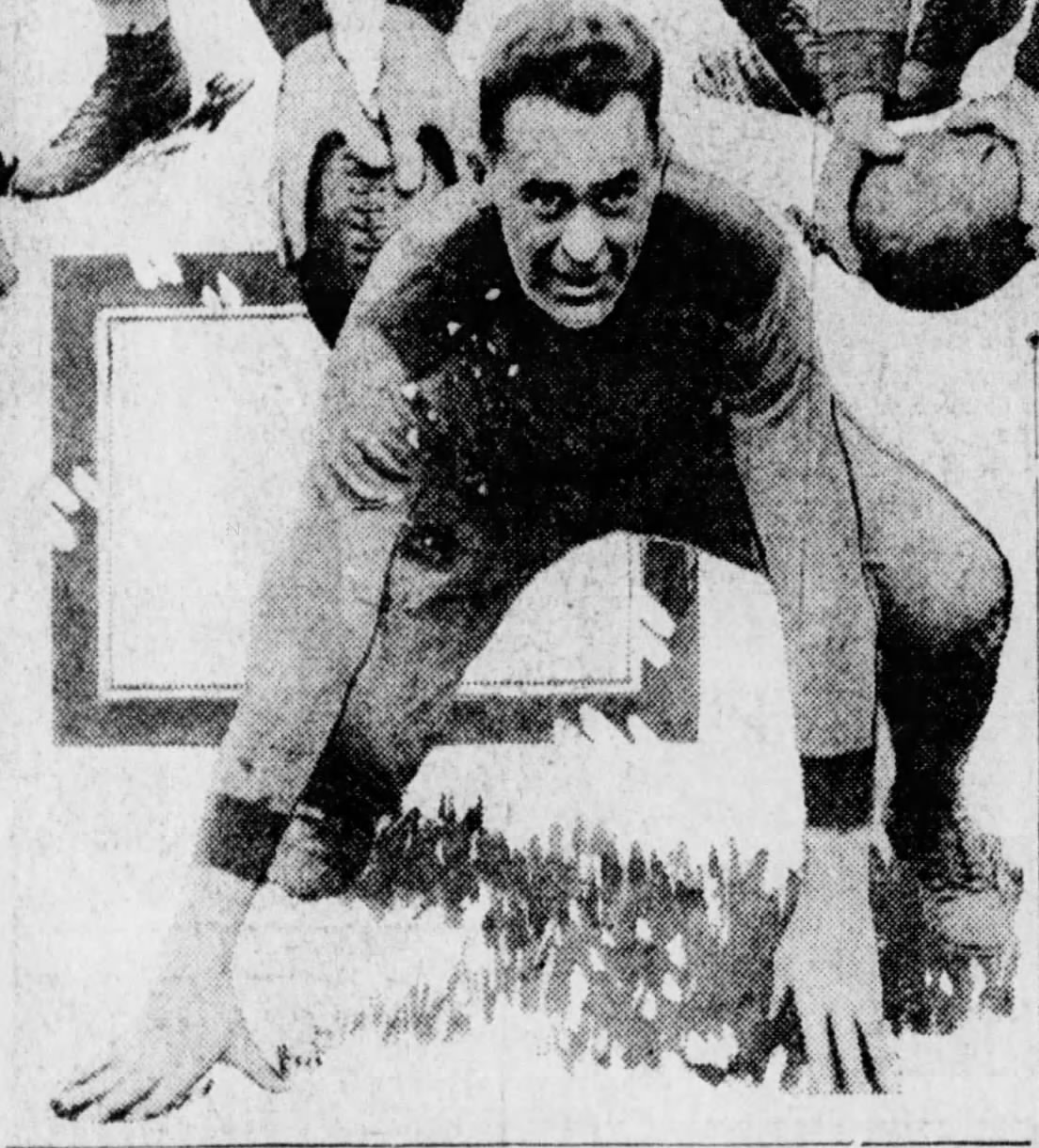
- Wimberly in 1925

Biographical details
- Born: September 3, 1892; Stevenson, Alabama, U.S.
- Died: May 12, 1956 (aged 63); Detroit, Michigan, U.S.

Playing career

Football
- 1916–1918: Washington & Jefferson
- 1925: Detroit Panthers
- Positions: Guard, tackle

Coaching career (HC unless noted)

Football
- 1919: Westminster (PA)
- 1921–1922: Illinois Wesleyan
- 1923–1924: Washington University

Basketball
- 1921–1923: Illinois Wesleyan

Baseball
- 1922: Illinois Wesleyan
- 1925: Illinois Wesleyan

Head coaching record
- Overall: 19–18–4 (football); 30–11 (basketball); 14–10 (baseball)

Adlai Byron "By" Wimberly (September 3, 1892 – May 12, 1956) was an American football player and coach of football, basketball, and baseball. He played college football at Washington & Jefferson College and professionally for the Detroit Panthers of the National Football League (NFL). Wimberly served as the head football coach at Westminster College in New Wilmington, Pennsylvania (1919), Illinois Wesleyan University (1921–1922), and Washington University in St. Louis (1923–1924), compiling a career college football coaching record of 19–18–4. He was also the head basketball coach at Illinois Wesleyan from 1921 to 1923, tallying a mark of 30–11, and the baseball coach at the school in 1922 and 1925. Wimberly later worked as a manufacturer's representative. He died on May 12, 1956, in Detroit, Michigan.

== Head coaching record ==
=== Football ===
Year	Team	Overall	Conference	Standing
Westminster Titans () (1919)
1919	Westminster	2–3–2		
Westminster:		2–3–2		
Illinois Wesleyan Titans (Illinois Intercollegiate Athletic Conference) (1921–1922)
1921	Illinois Wesleyan	4–3–2		
1922	Illinois Wesleyan	6–3		
Illinois Wesleyan:		10–6–2		
Washington University Pikers (Missouri Valley Conference) (1923–1924)
1923	Washington University	3–5	1–4	9th
1924	Washington University	4–4	0–4	9th
Washington University:		7–9	1–8	
Total:		19–18–4		
