= 1922 Baylor Bears football team =

American college football season

1922 Baylor Bears football

SWC champion
- Conference: Southwest Conference
- Record: 8–3 (5–0 SWC)
- Head coach: Frank Bridges (3rd season)
- Captain: Wes Bradshaw
- Home stadium: Carroll Field, Cotton Palace

1922 Southwest Conference football standings
	Conf.					Overall
Team	W		L		T	W		L		T
Baylor $	5	–	0	–	0	8	–	3	–	0
Texas	2	–	1	–	0	7	–	2	–	0
SMU	2	–	2	–	0	6	–	3	–	1
Texas A&M	2	–	2	–	0	5	–	4	–	1
Oklahoma A&M	2	–	3	–	0	4	–	4	–	1
Arkansas	1	–	3	–	0	4	–	5	–	0
Rice	1	–	4	–	0	4	–	4	–	0
$ – Conference champion

The 1922 Baylor Bears football team was an American football team that represented Baylor University as a member of the Southwest Conference (SWC) during the 1922 college football season. In its second season under head coach Frank Bridges, the team compiled an 8–3 record (5–0 against SWC opponents), won the conference championship, and outscored opponents by a total of 295 to 128.

== Schedule ==
Date	Time	Opponent	Site	Result	Attendance	Source
September 30		North Texas State Normal*	Carroll Field; Waco, TX	W 55–0		
October 7		Simmons (TX)*	Carroll Field; Waco, TX	W 42–0		
October 14		at Rice	Rice Field; Houston, TX	W 31–0		
October 21		Arkansas	Cotton Palace; Waco, TX	W 60–13		
October 21		at Phillips*	Alton Field; Enid, OK	L 0–47	2,000	
October 28		Mississippi College*	Cotton Palace; Waco, TX	W 40–7		
November 4		Texas A&M	Cotton Palace; Waco, TX (rivalry)	W 13–7		
November 11	1:00 p.m.	at Boston College*	Braves Field; Boston, MA	L 0–33		
November 18		at Oklahoma A&M	Lewis Field; Stillwater, OK	W 10–0		
November 30		at SMU	Fair Park Stadium; Dallas, TX	W 24–0		
December 9	3:00 p.m.	vs. Haskell*	Schwab Field; San Antonio, TX	L 20–21		
*Non-conference game; All times are in Central time
