= 1923 Rice Owls football team =

American college football season

1923 Rice Owls football
- Conference: Southwest Conference, Texas Intercollegiate Athletic Association
- Record: 3–5 (1–4 SWC, 2–1 TIAA)
- Head coach: Philip Arbuckle (11th season)
- Home stadium: Rice Field

1923 Southwest Conference football standings
	Conf.					Overall
Team	W		L		T	W		L		T
SMU $	5	–	0	–	0	9	–	0	–	0
Texas	2	–	0	–	1	8	–	0	–	1
TCU	2	–	1	–	0	4	–	5	–	0
Baylor	1	–	1	–	2	5	–	1	–	2
Arkansas	2	–	2	–	0	6	–	2	–	1
Oklahoma A&M	1	–	3	–	0	2	–	8	–	0
Rice	1	–	4	–	0	3	–	5	–	0
Texas A&M	0	–	3	–	1	5	–	3	–	1
$ – Conference champion

1923 Texas Intercollegiate Athletic Association football standings
	Conf.					Overall
Team	W		L		T	W		L		T
Austin $	4	–	0	–	1	7	–	2	–	1
Howard Payne	3	–	1	–	2	4	–	3	–	2
Simmons (TX)	2	–	1	–	2	3	–	5	–	2
Rice	2	–	1	–	0	3	–	5	–	0
Southwestern (TX)	2	–	1	–	1	2	–	5	–	1
North Texas State Teachers	3	–	2	–	0	3	–	5	–	0
Trinity (TX)	3	–	3	–	0	6	–	3	–	0
Sam Houston State	3	–	3	–	0	4	–	4	–	0
Southwest Texas State	3	–	4	–	0	4	–	4	–	0
West Texas State	1	–	3	–	0	4	–	4	–	1
East Texas State	1	–	4	–	0	2	–	6	–	0
Daniel Baker	1	–	5	–	0	1	–	6	–	0
$ – Conference champion

The 1923 Rice Owls football team was an American football team that represented Rice Institute as a member of the Southwest Conference (SWC) during the 1923 college football season. In its eleventh season under head coach Philip Arbuckle, the team compiled a 3–5 record (1–4 against SWC opponents) and was outscored by a total of 94 to 35.

== Schedule ==
Date	Opponent	Site	Result	Source
October 6	Sam Houston State	Rice Field; Houston, TX	W 10–0	
October 13	at Arkansas	Kavanaugh Field; Little Rock, AR	L 0–23	
October 20	Oklahoma A&M	Rice Field; Houston, TX	L 0–13	
October 27	Southwest Texas State	Rice Field; Houston, TX	L 6–19	
November 3	at Texas	Clark Field; Austin, TX (rivalry)	L 0–27	
November 10	Southwestern (TX)	Rice Field; Houston, TX	W 12–0	
November 17	Texas A&M	Rice Field; Houston, TX	W 7–6	
November 29	TCU	Rice Field; Houston, TX	L 0–6	
