= 1922 Rice Owls football team =

American college football season

1922 Rice Owls football
- Conference: Southwest Conference, Texas Intercollegiate Athletic Association
- Record: 4–4 (1–4 SWC, 1–0 TIAA)
- Head coach: Philip Arbuckle (10th season)
- Home stadium: Rice Field

1922 Southwest Conference football standings
	Conf.					Overall
Team	W		L		T	W		L		T
Baylor $	5	–	0	–	0	8	–	3	–	0
Texas	2	–	1	–	0	7	–	2	–	0
SMU	2	–	2	–	0	6	–	3	–	1
Texas A&M	2	–	2	–	0	5	–	4	–	1
Oklahoma A&M	2	–	3	–	0	4	–	4	–	1
Arkansas	1	–	3	–	0	4	–	5	–	0
Rice	1	–	4	–	0	4	–	4	–	0
$ – Conference champion

1922 Texas Intercollegiate Athletic Association football standings
	Conf.					Overall
Team	W		L		T	W		L		T
Austin $	5	–	1	–	0	6	–	2	–	0
North Texas State Normal	3	–	0	–	0	5	–	2	–	1
Rice	1	–	0	–	0	4	–	4	–	0
Simmons (TX)	4	–	1	–	1	5	–	3	–	1
Howard Payne	4	–	2	–	1	6	–	2	–	1
Trinity (TX)	2	–	2	–	2	3	–	2	–	3
Southwestern (TX)	2	–	3	–	0	4	–	6	–	0
Daniel Baker	2	–	4	–	0	2	–	6	–	0
East Texas State	0	–	2	–	0	4	–	5	–	0
West Texas State	0	–	2	–	0	2	–	8	–	0
Southwest Texas State	0	–	3	–	0	3	–	3	–	0
TCU	0	–	3	–	2	2	–	5	–	3
$ – Conference champion

The 1922 Rice Owls football team was an American football team that represented Rice Institute as a member of the Southwest Conference (SWC) during the 1922 college football season. In its tenth season under head coach Philip Arbuckle, the team compiled a 4–4 record (1–4 against SWC opponents) and was outscored by a total of 128 to 96.

== Schedule ==
Date	Opponent	Site	Result	Source
October 7	Sam Houston Normal*	Rice Field; Houston, TX	W 23–3	
October 14	Baylor	Rice Field; Houston, TX	L 0–31	
October 21	at Oklahoma A&M	Lewis Field; Stillwater, OK	L 0–21	
October 28	Southwestern (TX)	Rice Field; Houston, TX	W 28–6	
November 4	Texas	Rice Field; Houston, TX (rivalry)	L 0–29	
November 11	Arkansas	Rice Field; Houston, TX	W 31–7	
November 18	at Texas A&M	Kyle Field; College Station, TX	L 0–24	
November 25	Arizona*	Rice Field; Houston, TX	W 14–7	
*Non-conference game
