= 1922 Texas Longhorns football team =

American college football season

1922 Texas Longhorns football
- Conference: Southwest Conference
- Record: 7–2 (2–1 SWC)
- Head coach: Berry Whitaker (3rd season)
- Captain: A. M. G. Swenson
- Home stadium: Clark Field

1922 Southwest Conference football standings
	Conf.					Overall
Team	W		L		T	W		L		T
Baylor $	5	–	0	–	0	8	–	3	–	0
Texas	2	–	1	–	0	7	–	2	–	0
SMU	2	–	2	–	0	6	–	3	–	1
Texas A&M	2	–	2	–	0	5	–	4	–	1
Oklahoma A&M	2	–	3	–	0	4	–	4	–	1
Arkansas	1	–	3	–	0	4	–	5	–	0
Rice	1	–	4	–	0	4	–	4	–	0
$ – Conference champion

The 1922 Texas Longhorns football team represented the University of Texas at Austin in the 1922 college football season. In their third and final year under head coach Berry Whitaker, the Longhorns compiled a 7–2 record and outscored all opponents by a collective total of 202 to 68.

== Schedule ==
Date	Opponent	Site	Result	Attendance	Source
September 29	Austin*	Clark Field; Austin, TX	W 19–0		
October 7	Phillips*	Clark Field; Austin, TX	W 41–10		
October 14	Oklahoma A&M	Clark Field; Austin, TX	W 19–7		
October 21	vs. Vanderbilt*	Fair Park Stadium; Dallas, TX	L 10–20	11,000	
October 28	Alabama*	Clark Field; Austin, TX	W 19–10		
November 4	at Rice	Rice Field; Houston, TX (rivalry)	W 29–0		
November 11	Southwestern (TX)*	Clark Field; Austin, TX	W 26–0		
November 18	at Oklahoma*	Boyd Field; Norman, OK (rivalry)	W 32–7		
November 30	Texas A&M	Clark Field; Austin, TX (rivalry)	L 7–14	20,000	
*Non-conference game
