= Panther Park =

Ballparks in Fort Worth, Texas

Panther Park was the name of two ballparks located in Fort Worth, Texas. They were the home fields of the Fort Worth Panthers from 1911 to 1925 and from 1926 onward, respectively.

Newly-built Morris Park

The first park was initially called Morris Park, after club owner J. Walter Morris. The facility replaced Haines Park which existed from 1902 through 1910. By November 1914, after four seasons, Morris sold his interest in the club, and the new owner renamed it Panther Park.

Morris/Panther Park (I) seated only 4,000 fans. The third base grandstand initially did not have a canopy to protect the fans from the relentless heat. The first base grandstand had a canopy, and the third base side later had a canopy added. The park was located on the "west side of North Main Street between 6th and 7th Streets". Its more precise location, per the 1925 news article, was North Throckmorton Street (northeast, third base), which is two blocks southeast of Main; Northwest 6th Street (southeast, left field); Northwest 7th Street (northwest, first base); and railroad tracks (southwest, right field).

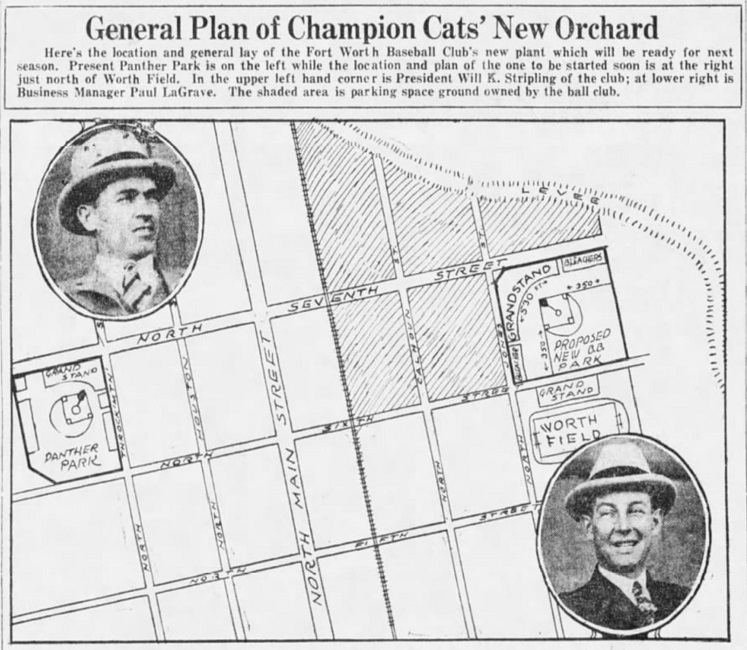
Old and new Panther Parks in 1925 newspaper

The Panthers won six consecutive Texas League crowns from 1920 to 1925. In 1919, they were the runners-up to Shreveport as they lost four games to two in the championship series even though they finished the regular season at the top of the standings. In 1925, they swept the Dallas Steers in a best-of-five series to determine the second half champion, clinching the Texas League title in the process.

The field was replaced in 1926 by a new Panther Park (II). That park was located on the east side of North Main Street, five short blocks (Houston, Main, Commerce, Calhoun and Jones Streets) directly east-northeast of the original Panther Park. It seated about 13,000 fans. After the death of Panthers' owner Paul LaGrave in 1929, the second Panther Park was renamed LaGrave Field.

== Sources ==
- "Baseball in the Lone Star State: Texas League's Greatest Hits," Tom Kayser and David King, Trinity University Press 2005
- "When Panthers Roared: The Fort Worth Cats and Minor League Baseball," Jeff Guinn with Bobby Bragan, c.1999
- "Baseball in Fort Worth," Mark Presswood and Chris Holoday, c.2004
