= Safeway Bowl =

American college football rivalry

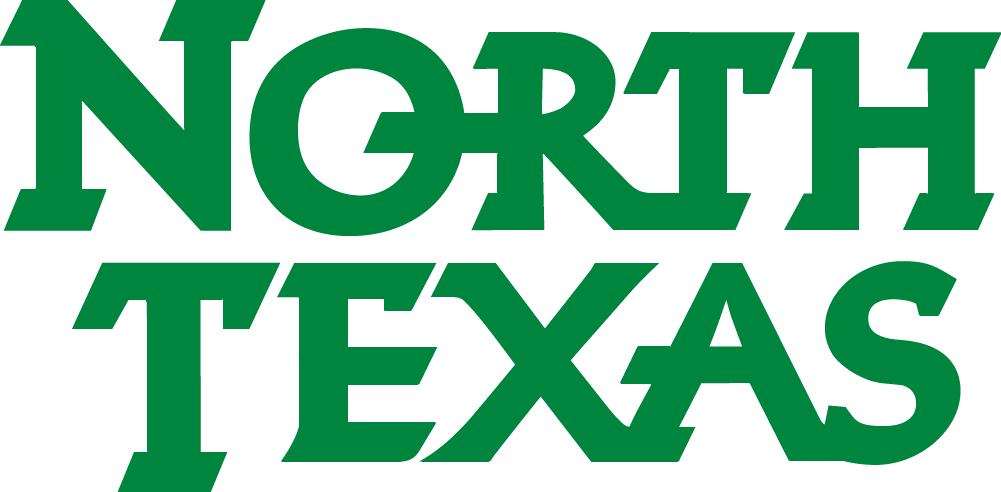
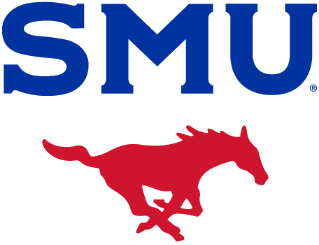
- North Texas Mean Green SMU Mustangs
- Sport: Football
- First meeting: October 7, 1922; SMU 66, North Texas State Normal 0
- Latest meeting: November 10, 2023; SMU 45, North Texas 21

Statistics
- Total meetings: 43
- All-time series: SMU leads 36–6–1 (.849)
- Largest victory: North Texas, 43–6 (2014); SMU, 68–0 (1927)
- Longest win streak: SMU, 11 (1934–1976)
- Current win streak: SMU, 5 (2019–present)

Locations of North Texas and SMU

The Safeway Bowl is the name given to the North Texas–SMU football rivalry. It is a college football rivalry game between the Southern Methodist University Mustangs football team and the University of North Texas Mean Green football team. The two universities are in the Dallas–Fort Worth metroplex.

== History ==
The two teams first met in 1922, with a 66–0 win for SMU over North Texas. The match-up has geographic relevance, as North Texas and SMU are the largest public and private universities in the DFW area respectively. As bitter cross-Metroplex rivals, the two teams have met 41 times in total.

Its name is derived from a challenge from former UNT head coach Matt Simon, who after a two year break in the series, stated "I'd like to play because I think we could beat them, and my players feel the same way. If they'd like to play on a Safeway parking lot ... just give us a date and time."

SMU leads the series 36–6–1, as the series had three major hiatuses since its original start. The series has been ongoing since its renewal in 2013, and was expected to continue as North Texas joined the American Athletic Conference in 2023, which SMU has previously been a member of. However, on September 1, 2023, it was announced that SMU would be joining the Atlantic Coast Conference in 2024.

== Game results ==
SMU victories	North Texas victories	Tie games

No.	Date	Location	Winner	Score
1	October 7, 1922	Armstrong Field	SMU	66–0
2	September 29, 1923	Armstrong Field	SMU	41–0
3	September 27, 1924	Armstrong Field	SMU	7–0
4	September 26, 1925	Armstrong Field	SMU	48–0
5	September 24, 1926	Ownby Stadium	SMU	42–0
6	September 24, 1927	Ownby Stadium	SMU	68–0
7	September 22, 1928	Ownby Stadium	SMU	60–6
8	September 21, 1929	Ownby Stadium	SMU	13–3
9	September 26, 1931	Ownby Stadium	SMU	13–0
10	September 24, 1932	Ownby Stadium	Tie	0–0
11	September 23, 1933	Ownby Stadium	North Texas State Teachers	7–0
12	September 22, 1934	Ownby Stadium	SMU	33–0
13	September 21, 1935	Ownby Stadium	SMU	39–0
14	September 26, 1936	Ownby Stadium	SMU	6–0
15	September 25, 1937	Ownby Stadium	SMU	14–0
16	September 24, 1938	Ownby Stadium	SMU	34–7
17	October 7, 1939	Ownby Stadium	SMU	16–0
18	October 5, 1940	Ownby Stadium	SMU	20–0
19	September 27, 1941	Ownby Stadium	SMU	54–0
20	September 26, 1942	Ownby Stadium	SMU	26–7
21	September 14, 1974	Cotton Bowl	SMU	7–6
22	September 25, 1976	Cotton Bowl	SMU	38–31

No.	Date	Location	Winner	Score
23	September 17, 1977	Texas Stadium	North Texas State	24–13
24	September 22, 1979	Texas Stadium	#18 SMU	20–9
25	September 13, 1980	Texas Stadium	SMU	28–9
26	September 12, 1981	Texas Stadium	SMU	34–7
27	October 2, 1982	Texas Stadium	#7 SMU	38–10
28	September 22, 1984	Texas Stadium	#13 SMU	24–6
29	October 28, 1989	Ownby Stadium	SMU	35–9
30	October 6, 1990	Fouts Field	North Texas	14–7
31	September 12, 1992	Ownby Stadium	SMU	28–14
32	September 9, 2006	Fouts Field	North Texas	24–6
33	September 8, 2007	Gerald J. Ford Stadium	SMU	45–31
34	September 6, 2014	Apogee Stadium	North Texas	43–6
35	September 12, 2015	Gerald J. Ford Stadium	SMU	31–13
36	September 3, 2016	Apogee Stadium	SMU	34–21
37	September 9, 2017	Gerald J. Ford Stadium	SMU	54–32
38	September 1, 2018	Apogee Stadium	North Texas	46–23
39	September 7, 2019	Gerald J. Ford Stadium	SMU	49–27
40	September 19, 2020	Apogee Stadium	SMU	65–35
41	September 11, 2021	Gerald J. Ford Stadium	SMU	35–12
42	September 3, 2022	Apogee Stadium	SMU	48–10
43	November 10, 2023	Gerald J. Ford Stadium	SMU	45–21
Series: SMU leads 36–6–1

== Notes ==
• Despite having their home games at the Cotton Bowl for 46 years, North Texas played SMU there just twice. The first 21 games of the series came before the arrival of Doak Walker to SMU, whose play attracted the large crowds that prompted the school to move its home games out of Ownby Stadium to the larger venue in Fair Park.
• Of the 39 games played between the two schools, just five of those have taken place in Denton. Ownby Stadium was seen as the far superior venue to the tiny Eagle Field that North Texas played on before 1952, which sat just 5,000 people to Ownby's 23,000. When the series resumed in the 1970s, the Cotton Bowl and Texas Stadium both held vastly more fans than Fouts Field could. Only after SMU moved its home games back on campus following the death penalty did the schools start playing games in Denton. Fouts Field hosted its first Safeway Bowl in 1990, which North Texas won to snap a six-game losing streak in the series.
• Both schools have largely had success in the series when playing on their campuses. North Texas holds a 4–3–0 record in games played at Fouts Field or Apogee Stadium, while SMU holds a remarkable 23–1–1 record in games played at Armstrong Field, Ownby Stadium, or Ford Stadium. SMU's only win on UNT's campus came on September 3, 2016, while UNT's only win on SMU's campus came on September 23, 1933. SMU leads the series 7–1–0 when the game was played at either the Cotton Bowl or Texas Stadium.
• 16 of the 40 contests have ended with a shutout (40%), including the 1932 game which ended in a scoreless tie. North Texas was on the losing end of all of those shutouts except the tie and a 7–0 win in 1933 (UNT's most recent win on SMU's campus). The first six games of the series, all won by SMU, were also shutouts.
