= Cotton Palace =

Exhibition ground in Waco, Texas, US

Coordinates: 31.5461°N 97.1342°W

Texas Cotton Palace
- A postcard depicting the Cotton Palace
- Interactive map of Texas Cotton Palace
- Record attendance: 117,208

A post card of the Cotton Palace grounds from the Baylor University Texas Collection

The Cotton Palace was an exhibition ground in the area of Clay Avenue, Dutton Avenue and South Sixteenth Street in Waco, Texas, from 1895 to 1930. It was built to highlight cotton-growing activities in the area.

== First Cotton Palace ==
The choice to establish a cotton exhibition in Waco was likely a result of Waco's role as one of the largest cotton markets in the region, with over 120,000 bales of cotton traded in the city in 1883. The city's location near the Bosque and Brazos rivers gave it a fertile environment for cotton production.

Following a campaign where Waco residents raised $40,000 to build the facility, plans were drawn up in 1894 for the Texas Cotton Palace in Padgitt Park. Construction was swift, and on November 8, 1894, the first Cotton Palace exhibition was opened by Texas governor James Hogg, which began a month of festivities. The building itself was short-lived and, on January 19, 1895, burned to the ground.

== Second Cotton Palace ==
Despite the popularity of the first Cotton Palace exhibition, a movement to rebuild the Cotton Palace did not occur for 15 years. In 1910, the Young Man's Business League of Waco sold stock and raised over $100,000 to build a second, significantly expanded, Cotton Palace, with Albert C. Clifton, YMBL president, also serving as president of the board of the directors for the new Cotton Palace. The Cotton Palace's supporters purchased Padgitt Park from its namesake, Tom Padgitt, and expanded beyond the building itself to build a 10,000-seat arena, a racetrack, an auditorium, a zoo, carnival grounds, and a football field. This second Cotton Palace lasted for 21 consecutive years of autumn exhibitions, with no interruption for World War I. During this period, over eight million visitors attended the exhibitions.

The exhibition over those 21 years included a wide variety of events, including parades, livestock shows, art exhibits, and, in 1918, mock battles and an air show involving 148 planes. Every year the exhibition held the Queen's Ball, Waco's largest social event of the year. The record daily attendance of 117,208 visitors was recorded on November 3, 1923.

The exposition closed permanently on October 19, 1930, due to the decline of the cotton market as well as the Great Depression.

After years in disrepair, the buildings were demolished. The City of Waco sold the material for $10,265 to Morrow Wrecking, who on Monday, February 8, 1943, razed the buildings, dug out the foundations, graded the ground and hauled the scrap away. The only remaining structure was the stage area from the coliseum, which served as the changing rooms for the Sun Pool. The structure was destroyed in the devastating tornado that struck downtown Waco on May 11, 1953, killing two lifeguards that were sheltering in the underground locker rooms.

The cornerstone of the original Cotton Palace building is mounted at Lover's Leap in Waco's Cameron Park.
