= 1920 Southwest Conference football season =

- Sport: Football
- Duration: September 25 – November 27, 1920
- Number of teams: 8
- Champion: Texas

SWC seasons
- ← 1919 1921 →

1920 Southwest Conference football standings
	Conf.					Overall
Team	W		L		T	W		L		T
Texas $	5	–	0	–	0	9	–	0	–	0
Texas A&M	5	–	1	–	0	6	–	1	–	1
Arkansas	2	–	0	–	1	3	–	2	–	2
Rice	2	–	2	–	1	4	–	2	–	2
Baylor	1	–	2	–	1	4	–	4	–	1
SMU	0	–	4	–	1	3	–	5	–	2
Phillips	0	–	3	–	0	4	–	4	–	2
Oklahoma A&M	0	–	3	–	0	0	–	7	–	1
$ – Conference champion

The 1920 Southwest Conference football season was the sixth season of college football played by the member schools of the Southwest Conference (SWC) and was a part of the 1920 college football season. The Texas Longhorns won their first officially recognized conference championship (they won in 1916 and 1918 but were never crowned champions officially) and went undefeated in season play. This was also the first SWC without Oklahoma as they joined the MVIAA at the end of 1919 and the first season with Phillips.

== Results and team statistics ==
Conf. rank	Team	Head coach	Overall record	Conf. record	PPG	PAG
1	Texas	Berry Whitaker	9–0–0 (1.000)	5–0–0 (1.000)	31.3	1.4
2	Texas A&M	Dana X. Bible	6–1–1 (.813)	5–1–0 (.833)	28.6	0.9
3	Arkansas	George McLaren	3–2–2 (.571)	2–0–1 (.833)	6.0	3.1
4	Rice	Philip Arbuckle	4–2–2 (.625)	2–2–1 (.500)	13.1	3.5
5	Baylor	Frank Bridges	4–4–1 (.500)	1–2–1 (.375)	7.2	9.9
6	SMU	J. Burton Rix	3–5–2 (.400)	0–4–1 (.100)	12.5	9.0
7	Phillips	John Maulbetsch	4–4–2 (.500)	0–3–0 (.000)	8.9	12.4
8	Oklahoma A&M	Jim Pixlee	0–7–1 (.063)	0–3–0 (.000)	4.4	25.0

Key
PPG = Average of points scored per game
PAG = Average of points allowed per game

== Schedules ==
Index to colors and formatting
Non-conference matchup; SWC member won
Non-conference matchup; SWC member lost
Non-conference matchup; tie
SWC teams in **bold**

=== Week One ===
Date	Visiting team	Home team	Site	Result	Attendance	Ref.
September 25	Simmons (TX)	**Texas**	Clark Field • Austin, TX	**W** 63–0		
September 25	Austin	**Baylor**	Carroll Field • Waco, TX	**W** 9–0		
September 25	Daniel Baker	**SMU**	Armstrong Field • Dallas, TX	**W** 70–0		
September 25	Southwestern Normal (OK)	**Phillips**	Association Park • Enid, OK	**W** 35–0		

Week	No Game			
1	Texas A&M	Arkansas	Rice	Oklahoma A&M

=== Week Two ===
Date	Visiting team	Home team	Site	Result	Attendance	Ref.
October 1	Daniel Baker	**Texas A&M**	Kyle Field • College Station, TX	**W** 110–0		
October 1	**Phillips**	Northwestern Normal (OK)	Enid, OK	**W** 27–7		
October 2	Southwestern (TX)	**Texas**	Clark Field • Austin, TX	**W** 27–8		
October 2	Simmons (TX)	**SMU**	Armstrong Field • Dallas, TX	**T** 0–0		

Week	No Game			
2	Arkansas	Rice	Baylor	Oklahoma A&M

=== Week Three ===
Date	Visiting team	Home team	Site	Result	Attendance	Ref.
October 8	Haskell	**Phillips**	Enid, OK	**W** 7–6		
October 9	Howard Payne	**Texas**	Clark Field • Austin, TX	**W** 41–7		
October 9	**Texas A&M**	**SMU**	Armstrong Field • Dallas, TX	**TAMU** 3–0		
October 9	Hendrix	**Arkansas**	The Hill • Fayetteville, AR	**T** 0-0		
October 9	**Baylor**	**Rice**	Rice Field • Houston, TX	**RICE** 28-0		
October 9	**Oklahoma A&M**	Kendall	McNulty Park • Tulsa, OK (rivalry)	**L** 14-20	5,000	

=== Week Four ===
Date	Visiting team	Home team	Site	Result	Attendance	Ref.
October 15	LSU	**Texas A&M**	Kyle Field • College Station, TX (rivalry)	**T** 0–0		
October 15	Howard Payne	**SMU**	Armstrong Field • Dallas, TX	**W** 14–0		
October 16	**Oklahoma A&M**	**Texas**	Fair Park Stadium • Dallas, TX	**UT** 21-0	8,000	
October 16	TCU	**Arkansas**	The Hill • Fayetteville, AR	**L** 2–19		
October 16	**Rice**	Tulane	Heinemann Park • New Orleans, LA	**T** 0–0		
October 16	Trinity (TX)	**Baylor**	Carroll Field • Waco, TX	**W** 20–6		
October 16	Simmons (TX)	**Phillips**	Alton Field • Enid, OK	**W** 13–7		

=== Week Five ===
Date	Visiting team	Home team	Site	Result	Attendance	Ref.
October 22	Austin	**Texas**	Clark Field • Austin, TX	**W** 54–0		
October 22	**Phillips**	**Texas A&M**	Kyle Field • College Station, TX	**TAMU** 47-0		
October 22	**Baylor**	**Oklahoma A&M**	Lewis Field • Stillwater, OK	**BAY** 7–0		
October 23	**Arkansas**	**SMU**	State Fair gridiron • Dallas, TX	**ARK** 6-0		
October 23	Southwestern (TX)	**Rice**	Rice Field • Houston, TX	**W** 19–0		

=== Week Six ===
Date	Visiting team	Home team	Site	Result	Attendance	Ref.
October 30	**Texas**	**Rice**	Rice Field • Houston, TX (rivalry)	**UT** 21–0		
October 30	**Texas A&M**	**Oklahoma A&M**	Lewis Field • Stillwater, OK	**TAMU** 35–0		
October 30	Missouri Mines	**Arkansas**	The Hill • Fayetteville, AR	**W** 14–0		
October 30	Southwestern (TX)	**Baylor**	Carroll Field • Waco, TX	**L** 0-7		
October 30	Trinity (TX)	**SMU**	Armstrong Field • Dallas, TX	**W** 38–7		
October 30	**Phillips**	TCU	Panther Park • Fort Worth, TX	**L** 0–3		

=== Week Seven ===
Date	Visiting team	Home team	Site	Result	Attendance	Ref.
November 5	**Phillips**	**Texas**	Clark Field • Austin, TX	**UT** 27-0		
November 6	**Texas A&M**	**Baylor**	Carroll Field • Waco, TX (rivalry)	**TAMU** 24–0		
November 6	**Arkansas**	LSU	Fair Grounds • Shreveport, LA (rivalry)	**L** 0-3		
November 6	**Rice**	**SMU**	Armstrong Field • University Park, TX (rivalry)	**RICE** 10–0		

Week	No Game
7	Oklahoma A&M

=== Week Eight ===
Date	Visiting team	Home team	Site	Result	Attendance	Ref.
November 13	**SMU**	**Texas**	Clark Field • Austin, TX	**UT** 63–0		
November 13	**Arkansas**	**Phillips**	Enid, OK	**ARK** 20–0		
November 13	TCU	**Baylor**	Cotton Palace • Waco, TX (rivalry)	**L** 9–21		
November 13	Oklahoma	**Oklahoma A&M**	Lewis Field • Stillwater, OK (rivalry)	**L** 0–36		

Week	No Game	
8	Texas A&M	Rice

=== Week Nine ===
Date	Visiting team	Home team	Site	Result	Attendance	Ref.
November 16	**Rice**	**Texas A&M**	Kyle Field • College Station, TX	**TAMU** 6–0		
November 19	Southwest Texas State	**Rice**	Rice Field • Houston, TX	**W** 48–0		
November 19	Kendall	**Phillips**	Alton Field • Enid, OK	**T** 0–0		
November 20	Howard Payne	**Baylor**	Carroll Field • Waco, TX	**W** 20-3		
November 20	Austin	**SMU**	Armstrong Field • Dallas, TX	**L** 0–43		
November 20	**Oklahoma A&M**	Haskell	Assosciation Park • Kansas City, MO	**L** 7-33	5,000	

Week	No Game	
9	Texas	Arkansas

=== Week Ten ===
Date	Visiting team	Home team	Site	Result	Attendance	Ref.
November 25	**Texas A&M**	**Texas**	Clark Field • Austin, TX (rivalry)	**UT** 7–3	20,000	
November 25	**Arkansas**	**Rice**	Rice Field • Houston, TX	**T** 0–0	5,000	
November 25	Central State Teachers	**Phillips**	Enid, OK	**T** 7–7		
November 25	Colorado	**Oklahoma A&M**	Western League Park • Oklahoma City, OK	**L** 7-40		
November 27	**Baylor**	**SMU**	Armstrong Field • University Park, TX	**T** 0-0		
