= List of Oklahoma State Cowboys football seasons =

This is a list of Oklahoma State Cowboys football seasons. The Cowboys are part of the National Collegiate Athletic Association (NCAA) Division I Football Bowl Subdivision (FBS). Since their inception in 1901, the Cowboys have played in over 1,100 games through over a century of play along with 28 bowl games, with one interruption occurring in 1902.

== Year-by-year records ==
Year	Coach	Overall	Conference	Standing	Bowl/playoffs	Coaches^{#}	AP^{°}
Independent (1901–1904)
1901	No coach	2–3					
1902	Unofficial team	1–0					
1903	No coach	0–2–2					
1904	No coach	0–4–1					
Frank A. McCoy (Independent) (1905)
1905	Frank A. McCoy	1–3–2					
Boyd Hill (Independent) (1906)
1906	Boyd Hill	1–4–2					
Ed Parry (Independent) (1907–1908)
1907	Ed Parry	1–3–1					
1908	Ed Parry	4–3					
Paul J. Davis (Independent) (1909–1914)
1909	Paul J. Davis	5–3					
1910	Paul J. Davis	3–4					
1911	Paul J. Davis	5–2					
1912	Paul J. Davis	6–2					
1913	Paul J. Davis	4–3					
1914	Paul J. Davis	6–2–1					
John G. Griffith (Southwest Conference) (1915–1916)
1915	John G. Griffith	4–5–1	0–3	7th			
1916	John G. Griffith	4–4	0–3	T–7th			
E.A. Pritchard (Southwest Conference) (1917–1918)
1917	E.A. Pritchard	4–5	1–2	6th			
1918	E.A. Pritchard	4–2	0–2	T–7th			
Jim Pixlee (Southwest Conference) (1919–1920)
1919	Jim Pixlee	3–3–2	0–2	7th			
1920	Jim Pixlee	0–7–1	0–3	T–7th			
John Maulbetsch (Southwest Conference) (1921–1924)
1921	John Maulbetsch	5–4–1	1–1	5th			
1922	John Maulbetsch	4–4–1	2–3	5th			
1923	John Maulbetsch	2–8	1–3	6th			
1924	John Maulbetsch	6–1–2	1–1–1	5th			
John Maulbetsch (Missouri Valley Conference) (1925–1928)
1925	John Maulbetsch	2–5–1	0–3–1	10th			
1926	John Maulbetsch	3–4–1	3–0–1	1st			
1927	John Maulbetsch	4–4	2–1	3rd			
1928	John Maulbetsch	1–7	0–1	5th			
Pappy Waldorf (Missouri Valley Conference) (1929–1933)
1929	Pappy Waldorf	4–3–2	1–1	3rd			
1930	Pappy Waldorf	7–2–1	2–0	T–1st			
1931	Pappy Waldorf	8–2–1	1–0	T-1st			
1932	Pappy Waldorf	9–1–2	3–0	1st			
1933	Pappy Waldorf	6–2–1	2–0	1st			
Albert Exendine (Missouri Valley Conference) (1934–1935)
1934	Albert Exendine	4–5–1	1–1	3rd			
1935	Albert Exendine	3–7	0–3	7th			
Ted Cox (Missouri Valley Conference) (1936–1938)
1936	Ted Cox	1–9	1–2	5th			
1937	Ted Cox	4–6	2–2	T–4th			
1938	Ted Cox	2–8	0–4	8th			
Jim Lookabaugh (Missouri Valley Conference) (1939–1949)
1939	Jim Lookabaugh	5–4–1	3–1	2nd			
1940	Jim Lookabaugh	6–3–1	4–1	2nd			
1941	Jim Lookabaugh	5–4	3–1	2nd			
1942	Jim Lookabaugh	6–3–1	4–1	2nd			
1943	Jim Lookabaugh	3–4	0–1	2nd			
1944	Jim Lookabaugh	8–1	1–0	1st	W Cotton		
1945	Jim Lookabaugh	9–0	1–0	1st	W Sugar		5
1946	Jim Lookabaugh	3–7–1	1–1	T–3rd			
1947	Jim Lookabaugh	3–7	0–2	5th			
1948	Jim Lookabaugh	6–4	2–0	1st	L Delta		
1949	Jim Lookabaugh	4–4–2	2–1–1	3rd			
J.B. Whitworth (Missouri Valley Conference) (1950–1954)
1950	J.B. Whitworth	4–6–1	1–2–1	T–4th			
1951	J.B. Whitworth	3–7	3–2	2nd			
1952	J.B. Whitworth	3–7	2–2	3rd			
1953	J.B. Whitworth	7–3	3–1	T–1st			
1954	J.B. Whitworth	5–4–1	2–2	3rd			
Cliff Speegle (Missouri Valley Conference) (1955–1956)
1955	Cliff Speegle	2–8	1–3	T–4th			
1956	Cliff Speegle	3–5–2	2–1–1	T–2nd			
Cliff Speegle (Independent) (1957–1959)
1957	Cliff Speegle	6–3–1					
1958	Cliff Speegle	8–3			W Bluegrass		19
1959	Cliff Speegle	6–4					
Cliff Speegle (Big Eight Conference) (1960–1962)
1960	Cliff Speegle	3–7	2–5	T–6th			
1961	Cliff Speegle	4–6	2–5	T–6th			
1962	Cliff Speegle	4–6	2–5	6th			
Phil Cutchin (Big Eight Conference) (1963–1968)
1963	Phil Cutchin	1–8	0–6	8th			
1964	Phil Cutchin	4–6	3–4	T–5th			
1965	Phil Cutchin	3–7	2–5	T–6th			
1966	Phil Cutchin	4–5–1	4–2–1	T–3rd			
1967	Phil Cutchin	4–5–1	3–4	T–5th			
1968	Phil Cutchin	3–7	2–5	T–6th			
Floyd Gass (Big Eight Conference) (1969–1971)
1969	Floyd Gass	5–5	3–4	T–5th			
1970	Floyd Gass	4–7	2–5	T–6th			
1971	Floyd Gass	4–6–1	2–5	T–5th			
Dave Smith (Big Eight Conference) (1972)
1972	Dave Smith	6–5	4–3	T–3rd			
Jim Stanley (Big Eight Conference) (1973–1978)
1973	Jim Stanley	5–4–2	2–3–2	5th			
1974	Jim Stanley	7–5	4–3	4th	W Fiesta		
1975	Jim Stanley	7–4	3–4	T–5th			
1976	Jim Stanley	9–3	5–2	T–1st	W Tangerine	14	14
1977	Jim Stanley	4–7	2–5	7th			
1978	Jim Stanley	3–8	3–4	T–5th			
Jimmy Johnson (Big Eight Conference) (1979–1983)
1979	Jimmy Johnson	7–4	5–2	3rd			
1980	Jimmy Johnson	3–7–1	2–4–1	5th			
1981	Jimmy Johnson	7–5	4–3	T–3rd	L Independence		
1982	Jimmy Johnson	4–5–2	3–2–2	3rd			
1983	Jimmy Johnson	8–4	3–4	T–4th	W Bluebonnet	18	
Pat Jones (Big Eight Conference) (1984–1994)
1984	Pat Jones	10–2	5–2	3rd	W Gator	5	7
1985	Pat Jones	8–4	4–3	T–3rd	L Gator		
1986	Pat Jones	6–5	4–3	4th			
1987	Pat Jones	10–2	5–2	3rd	W Sun	12	11
1988	Pat Jones	10–2	5–2	3rd	W Holiday	11	11
1989	Pat Jones	4–7	3–4	5th			
1990	Pat Jones	4–7	2–5	T–6th			
1991	Pat Jones	0–10–1	0–6–1	8th			
1992	Pat Jones	4–6–1	2–4–1	5th			
1993	Pat Jones	3–8	0–7	8th			
1994	Pat Jones	3–7–1	0–6–1	T–7th			
Bob Simmons (Big Eight Conference) (1995)
1995	Bob Simmons	4–8	2–5	T–5th			
Bob Simmons (Big 12 Conference) (1996–2000)
1996	Bob Simmons	5–6	2–6	5th (South)			
1997	Bob Simmons	8–4	5–3	T–2nd (South)	L Alamo	24	24
1998	Bob Simmons	5–6	3–5	T–4th (South)			
1999	Bob Simmons	5–6	3–5	5th (South)			
2000	Bob Simmons	3–8	1–7	5th (South)			
Les Miles (Big 12 Conference) (2001–2004)
2001	Les Miles	4–7	2–6	5th (South)			
2002	Les Miles	8–5	5–3	T–3rd (South)	W Houston		
2003	Les Miles	9–4	5–3	3rd (South)	L Cotton		
2004	Les Miles	7–5	4–4	5th (South)	L Alamo		
Mike Gundy (Big 12 Conference) (2005–present)
2005	Mike Gundy	4–7	1–7	6th (South)			
2006	Mike Gundy	7–6	3–5	T–5th (South)	W Independence		
2007	Mike Gundy	7–6	4–4	T–3rd (South)	W Insight		
2008	Mike Gundy	9–4	5–3	4th (South)	L Holiday	18	16
2009	Mike Gundy	9–4	6–2	2nd (South)	L Cotton	25	
2010	Mike Gundy	11–2	6–2	T–1st (South)	W Alamo	10	13
2011	Mike Gundy	12–1	8–1	1st	W Fiesta^{†}	3	3
2012	Mike Gundy	8–5	5–4	T–3rd	W Heart of Dallas		
2013	Mike Gundy	10–3	7–2	T–2nd	L Cotton	17	17
2014	Mike Gundy	7–6	4–5	7th	W Cactus		
2015	Mike Gundy	10–3	7–2	T–2nd	L Sugar^{†}	19	20
2016	Mike Gundy	10–3	7–2	T–2nd	W Alamo	11	11
2017	Mike Gundy	10–3	6–3	3rd	W Camping World	14	14
2018	Mike Gundy	7–6	3–6	T–7th	W Liberty		
2019	Mike Gundy	8–5	5–4	T–3rd	L Texas		
2020	Mike Gundy	8–3	6–3	3rd	W Cheez-It	19	20
2021	Mike Gundy	12–2	8–1	2nd	W Fiesta^{†}	7	7
2022	Mike Gundy	7–6	4–5	5th	L Guaranteed Rate		
2023	Mike Gundy	10–4	7–2	2nd	W Texas	16	16
2024	Mike Gundy	3–9	0–9	16th			
2025	Mike Gundy (Note: Mike Gundy was fired three games into the 2025 season. Offensive coordinator Doug Meacham served as interim head coach for the remainder of the season.)	1–11	0–9	16th			
Total:		648–575–49					
National championship Conference title Conference division title or championship game berth
^{†}Indicates Bowl Coalition, Bowl Alliance, BCS, or CFP / New Years' Six bowl.; ^{#}Rankings from final Coaches Poll.
