= Arbuckle =

Arbuckle may refer to:

== People ==
- Arbuckle (surname)
- William Arbuckle Reid (1933–2015), British educationalist

== Places ==
=== United Kingdom ===
- Arbuckle railway station, Scotland

=== United States ===
- Arbuckle, California
- Arbuckle, Pennsylvania
- Arbuckle, West Virginia
- The Arbuckle Mountains, Oklahoma
- Arbuckle Reservoir, Oklahoma
- Fort Arbuckle (Oklahoma), Garvin County, Oklahoma
- Fort Arbuckle (Florida)
- Lake of the Arbuckles, Oklahoma
- Old Fort Arbuckle, Tulsa County, Oklahoma

== Other uses ==
- Arbuckle (band), headed by musician and actor Danny Cooksey
- Arbuckle, play by Cintra Wilson
- Fatty Arbuckle's, restaurant chain in the UK
- Iggy Arbuckle, fictional pig in an animated program of the same name
- Moreland and Arbuckle, American blues duo
- NQ Arbuckle, Canadian alternative country band
- Jon Arbuckle, fictional character

== See also ==
- Arbuckle House (disambiguation)
