= 1920 Texas Longhorns football team =

American college football season

1920 Texas Longhorns football

SWC champion
- Conference: Southwest Conference
- Record: 9–0 (5–0 SWC)
- Head coach: Berry Whitaker (1st season)
- Captain: Maxey Hart
- Home stadium: Clark Field

Uniform
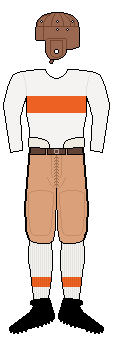

1920 Southwest Conference football standings
	Conf.					Overall
Team	W		L		T	W		L		T
Texas $	5	–	0	–	0	9	–	0	–	0
Texas A&M	5	–	1	–	0	6	–	1	–	1
Arkansas	2	–	0	–	1	3	–	2	–	2
Rice	2	–	2	–	1	4	–	2	–	2
Baylor	1	–	2	–	1	4	–	4	–	1
SMU	0	–	4	–	1	3	–	5	–	2
Phillips	0	–	3	–	0	4	–	4	–	2
Oklahoma A&M	0	–	3	–	0	0	–	7	–	1
$ – Conference champion

The 1920 Texas Longhorns football team represented the University of Texas at Austin in the 1920 college football season. In their first year under head coach Berry Whitaker, the Longhorns compiled an undefeated 9–0 record, shut out six of nine opponents, and outscored all opponents by a collective total of 282 to 13.

The meeting of Texas and Texas A&M in 1920 is said to have really started the rivalry. Both teams were undefeated and the game featured the largest crowd in state history. Texas won 7–3. The game turned on a play where the Longhorns' tackle declared himself eligible for a pass.

== Schedule ==
Date	Opponent	Site	Result	Attendance	Source
September 25	Simmons (TX)*	Clark Field; Austin, TX	W 63–0		
October 2	at Southwestern (TX)*	Clark Field; Austin, TX	W 27–8		
October 9	Howard Payne*	Clark Field; Austin, TX	W 41–7		
October 16	vs. Oklahoma A&M	Fair Park Stadium; Dallas, TX	W 21–0	8,000	
October 22	Austin	Clark Field; Austin, TX	W 54–0		
October 30	at Rice	Rice Field; Houston, TX (rivalry)	W 21–0		
November 5	Phillips	Clark Field; Austin, TX	W 27–0		
November 13	SMU	Clark Field; Austin, TX	W 21–3		
November 25	Texas A&M	Clark Field; Austin, TX (rivalry)	W 7–3	20,000	
*Non-conference game

== Game summaries ==
=== Vs. Simmons ===
The Longhorns opened the season against the Simmons Cowboys at Clark Field on September 25, shutting out the Cowboys with a score of 63-0. The Longhorns dominated the game which took place under intense heat that affected the players of both teams. The quarters were only 12 minutes in length.

=== Vs. Southwestern ===
In the second week of the season, the Longhorns defeated the Southwestern Pirates 27-8 at Clark Field on October 2nd. Despite the score the Longhorns were marred with penalties and, combined with a superb defensive performance by the Pirates, the score was much closer than initially expected. A bright spot on the Longhorns offense were the performances by Left Halfback Francisco Dominguez and Fullback A.Y. McCallum, both of whom often broke through the Pirates defense for large gains. Captain and Left End Maxey Hart also recovered a fumble returning it 45 yards for a touchdown.

=== Vs. Howard Payne ===
The Longhorns defeated Arnold L. Kirkpatrick's Howard Payne Yellow Jackets 41-7 on October 9th at Clark Field. Coach Whitaker played the starters for only a short amount of time and five starters (Elam, Ellis, McCulloch, and Green) never even entered the game, as they were resting for the Oklahoma A&M game the next week. The Longhorn's performance was noticeably different when the backups took over and multiple fumbles were lost but a poor offensive showing by Howard Payne allowed the Longhorns to find their footing. Howard Payne Quarterback J. Woodward scored their only touchdown of the game after a short line drive in the third quarter, and would be the only team to do so against Texas all season long.

=== Vs. Oklahoma A&M ===
Texas vs. Oklahoma A&M

Team	1	2	3	4	Total
Oklahoma A&M	0	0	0	0	0
• Texas	7	0	0	14	21

- Date: October 16
- Location: Fair Park Stadium
  Dallas, Texas
- Game attendance: 8,000

On October 16th the Longhorns defeated Jim Pixlee's Oklahoma A&M Aggies 21-0 at Fair Park Stadium in Dallas in front of a crowd of around 8,000 onlookers. After numerous offsides penalties the Longhorns scored near the end of the first quarter with a quick march down the field which McCallum ended by dashing off the right end for the touchdown. The second and third quarters did not see any scoring. The Aggies came close in each quarter, even reaching the Texas 20, but couldn't sustain their drives long enough to make any big plays.

Kyle Elam scored the second touchdown of the game in the fourth quarter to bring the score to 14-0. With five minutes left in the game, the Aggies had advanced the ball down to the Texas 35 yardline. Texas' Left Halfback Rat Watson intercepted the following pass and returned it 40 yards to the Aggie 45. Quarterback Kyle Elam then "brought the entire 8,000 spectators to their feet" on the next play when he broke through all of the Oklahoma defenders to score the final touchdown of the game.

The Longhorn Band performed before the game and during the halftime.

=== Vs. Austin College ===
Texas vs. Austin College

Team	1	2	3	4	Total
Austin College	0	0	0	0	0
• Texas	20	13	14	7	54

- Date: October 23
- Location: Clark Field
  Austin, Texas

On October 23rd the Longhorns faced Ewing Y. Freeland's Austin Kangaroos at Clark Field and trounced them 54-0. Left Halfback Rat Watson scored the first touchdown after a 30 yard run. At the end of the first quarter, with the score 20-0, Coach Whitaker pulled the starters and put in the backups. Hart, Tynes, Morgan, Watson, Elam, and Vowell scored the remaining touchdowns in the game.

=== At Rice ===
Texas at Rice

Team	1	2	3	4	Total
• Texas	0	14	0	7	21
Rice	0	0	0	0	0

- Date: October 30
- Location: Rice Field
  Houston, TX

The Longhorns traveled to Rice Field in Houston on October 30th and manhandled Philip Arbuckle's Rice Owls 21-0 in a game where Rice only obtained two first downs. The Longhorns dominated the rushing and passing game but struggled to find in the end zone in the first quarter. McCallum opened up the second quarter with a rushing touchdown from the Rice 5 yardline and Watson ended it with another touchdown after breaking through a gap in the Rice defensive line.

During halftime both teams students paraded on the field. The Texas students were accompanied by their band.

After another scoreless quarter the Owls began the fourth with the ball on their own 20. After completing a 25 yard pass they lined up for another pass play. Rice quarterback Dyer's pass was intercepted by McCallum who returned it over 60 yards for a pick-six after breaking numerous tackles. The only place where the Owls outperformed the Longhorns was in the punting game.

=== Vs. Phillips ===
Texas vs. Phillips

Team	1	2	3	4	Total
Phillips	0	0	0	0	0
• Texas	0	7	7	13	27

- Date: November 5
- Location: Clark Field
  Austin, TX

On November 5th the Longhorns beat John Maulbetsch's Phillips Haymakers 27-0 in a home game at Clark Field. The final score was in no way indicative of the grit showed by the Haymakers on the field and the Phillips team put up the toughest fight the Longhorns had faced at that point. After a scoreless first quarter, Lane Tynes carried the ball into the endzone after a series of end runs in the second quarter and did so again in similar fashion in the third.

The fourth quarter began with Longhorn possession of the ball at the Phillips 12 yardline. After a short drive Texas Quarterback Rat Watson rushed in to the endzone for the third touchdown of the game. At this point the Haymakers starters were exhausted and seeing this Coach Whitaker put in fresh backups on defense. This paid off perfectly when backup Fullback William Barry intercepted a Phillips forward pass and set up the last scoring drive of the game. The Longhorns marched down the field in quick fashion and the backup QB dashed in to the endzone but the extra point attempt was missed leaving the score at 27-0.

=== Vs. SMU ===
On November 13th the Longhorns beat J. Burton Rix's SMU Mustangs 21-3 in another home game at Clark Field. Texas quarterback Rat Watson was ejected from the game at the beginning of the second quarter for unnecessary roughness and was replaced by Kyle Elam. The Mustangs only scoring drive came off of an intercepted pass on the Texas 30 yardline, which ended in a successful Field goal.

=== Vs. Texas A&M ===
Texas vs. Texas A&M

Team	1	2	3	4	Total
Texas A&M	0	3	0	0	3
• Texas	0	0	0	7	7

- Date: November 25
- Location: Clark Field
  Austin, TX
- Game attendance: 20,000

On Thanksgiving day (November 25th) the Longhorns met Dana X. Bible's Texas A&M Aggies at Clark Field in Austin for what was considered the defacto Southwest Conference championship game since both teams were undefeated in conference play. The Aggies held a two year record of shutouts and hadn't allowed any points against them since the 1918 season.

The Aggies won the toss and elected to receive in the north endzone with the wind. The first quarter was a punting game and the only significant play was when the Longhorns recovered a blocked punt on the Aggie 40 yardline. The ensuing drive brought them all the way to the Aggie 20 but they failed to convert on fourth and the Aggies took possession. Texas' Rat Watson fumbled the next punt return in midfield and Aggie End Gouger recovered the ball as the quarter ended. At the beginning of the second quarter Texas stuffed three rushes and A&M Right Halfback Higginbotham kicked a field goal from the Texas 23 to take the lead 3-0. A series of disastrously executed punts followed on both sides of the ball but neither the Longhorns or Aggies could get far enough to put more points on the board

Texas received the ball to start the second half but lost control of the ball on a fumble and the Aggies took possession. After a turnover on downs the Longhorns ended up punting as well and both teams continued to punt back and forth for the remainder of the third quarter. With the beginning of the fourth the Longhorns still trailed by three. After receiving the punt on the 45 they marched down the field in three quick first downs off the back of Left Halfback Dominguez and quarterback Watson's electric rushing, along with a "brilliant" 9 yard pass from Right Halfback William Barry to Right Tackle Tom Dennis, who had declared himself eligible for a pass and caught the ball with one hand. Francisco Dominguez then barreled through the A&M Center for a 3 yard touchdown to take the lead 7-3. The Aggies attempted to gain yards on the kick return but got nothing, punting once again. The Longhorns once again marched down the field and missed a Field Goal attempt as time expired.

This game was said to be the one that truly started the Rivalry between Texas and Texas A&M.

== Personnel ==
=== Depth chart ===
Because players often switched between positions during the season, this chart represents the offensive lineup as it was during the 1920 game with A&M.

LE
Maxey Hart (C)
Joe Moore

LT	LG	C	RG	RT
George Green	Hawley Jones	Swede Swenson	George Hill	Tom Dennis
	Jack Vowell			

RE
George McCulloch

QB
Kyle Elam
Rat Watson

LH
Lane Tynes
F. Dominguez

FB
A. Y. McCallum
Rube Leissner

RH
Joe Ellis
William Barry

- In addition to this roster, two players (Archie Gray and Hawley Jones) were general substitutes.
