= Rat Watson =

American football player (1894–1965)

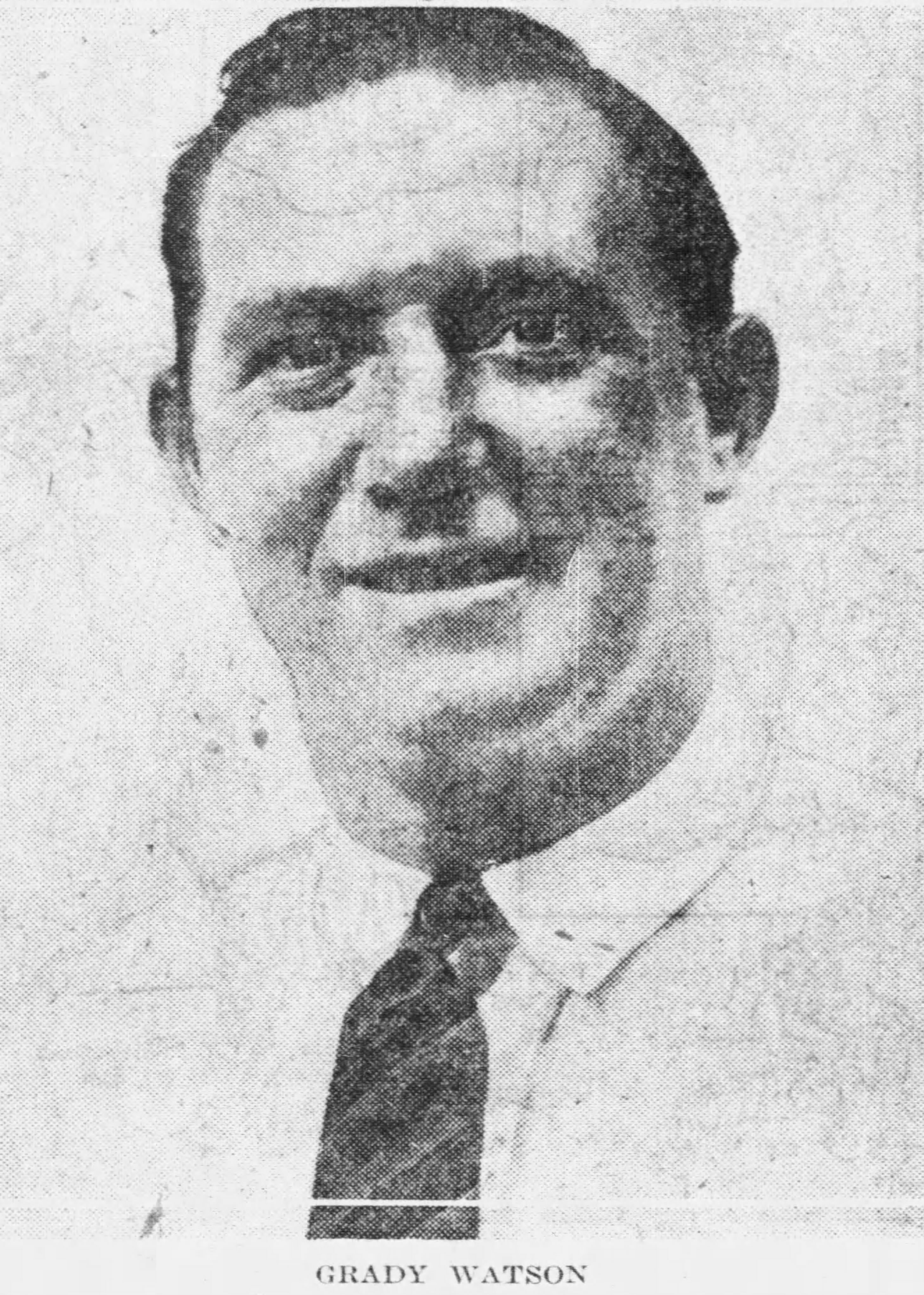
- Watson in 1925

No. 2
- Position: Quarterback

Personal information
- Born: February 10, 1894; Hemphill, Texas, U.S.
- Died: June 15, 1965 (aged 71); Houston, Texas, U.S.
- Listed height: 5 ft 10 in (1.78 m)
- Listed weight: 181 lb (82 kg)

Career information
- High school: Orange (Texas)
- College: Southwestern, Texas

Career history
- Toledo Maroons (1922–1923); Kansas City Blues (1924); Hammond Pros (1924–1925); Buffalo Bisons (1927)

Career NFL statistics
- Games played: 20
- Stats at Pro Football Reference

Alfred Grady "Rat" Watson (February 10, 1894 – June 15, 1965), sometimes referenced as Rats Watson, was an American football player. He was the quarterback of the 1916 Second Texas Infantry football team and also played for the 36th Infantry team and survived a gas attack during World War I. He also played college football for the Texas Longhorns in 1913 and 1919 to 1921, leading their 1920 team to a perfect 9–0 record and the Southwest Conference championship. He also played professional football as a quarterback for the Toledo Maroons, Kansas City Blues, Hammond Pros, and Buffalo Bisons in the National Football League (NFL) from 1922 to 1927.

After his football career ended, Watson worked from 1936 to 1959 as an agent for the Texas Liquor Board.

== Early life ==
Watson was born in 1894 in Hemphill, Texas. He attended and played football for Orange High School in Texas. As a senior in 1912, he led his team against the collegiate team from Rice Institute. Although Rice defeated Orange, Watson impressed Rice coach Philip Arbuckle who warned his players at halftime to "quit trying to tackle that little guy's legs."

In 1913, Watson played for the University of Texas freshman team. It was during his freshman year at Texas that he received the nickname "Rat": When Watson broke free during a scrimmage, a defensive teammate Mike Massey yelled, "Catch that rat!" After a dispute over grades, Watson transferred to Southwestern. He played for the Southwestern "scrub" team in 1915.

== Military football ==
=== Second Texas Infantry ===
In 1916, Watson, weighing only 141 pounds (64 kg), played at the quarterback position for the Second Texas Infantry football team that outscored opponents by a total of 432 to 6. Watson received a tarantula bite on his left foot on one game day and was forced to wear an 11-1/2 shoe on the swollen foot. When national guard units mobilized to the Mexican border as part of the Pancho Villa Expedition, the Second Texas Infantry won by a 69–0 score over a New York team featuring stars of Harvard, Yale, and Princeton, including eight or nine Walter Camp All-Americans. Watson scored two touchdowns against the Eastern stars.

The Second Texas Infantry team was referred to by Texans as "the greatest football team ever assembled in Texas." Watson later said of the Texas Infantry team: "I never expect to see again the perfect coordination there was on the Second Texas team. We ate together, slept together, and practiced every day for hours."

Bill Birge, who played guard for the Second Texas Infantry, said of Watson: "He's just the greatest quarterback who ever cleated a Southern gridiron."

=== 36th Infantry ===
When the United States entered World War I, Watson enlisted in the 36th Infantry Division and played for the unit's championship football team. During his wartime service, Watson was injured in a gas attack in the Argonne forest, spending 90 days in the hospital.

== Texas Longhorns ==
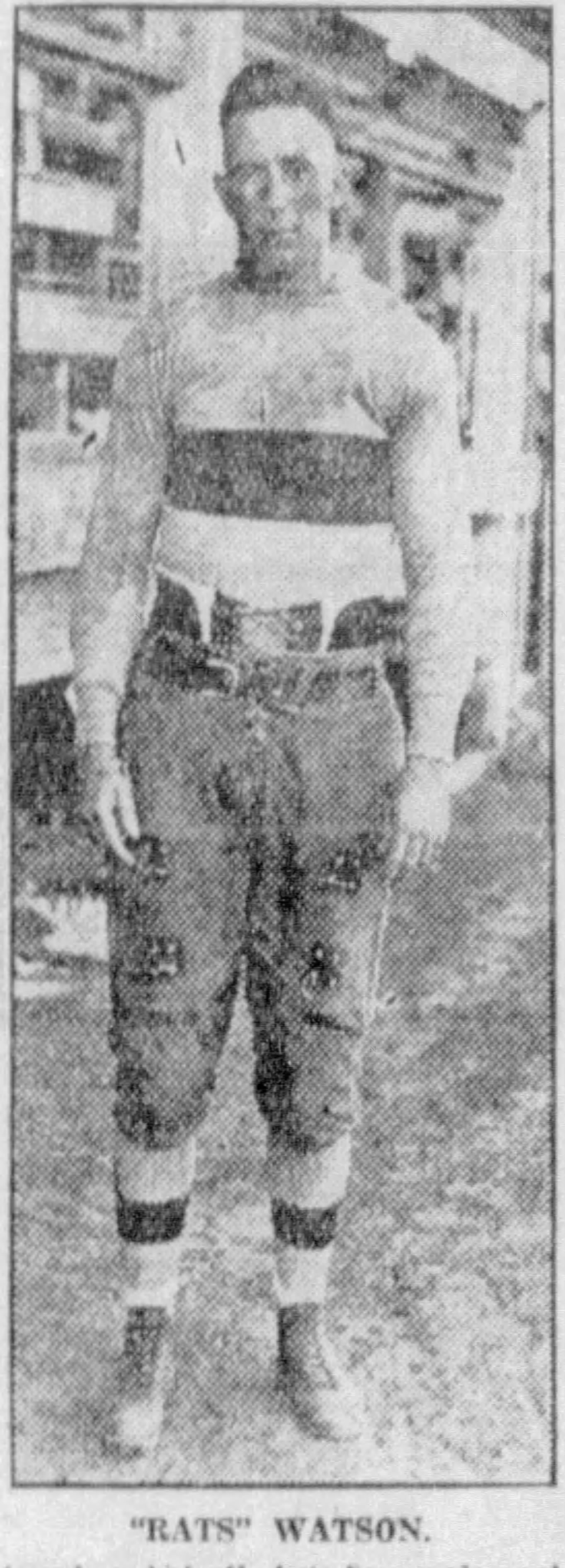
Rat Watson, 1920

Watson began the 1919 season with the Texas Longhorns varsity but was declared ineligible due to transfer rules. He played instead on the Texas "B" team in 1919, known as the "Shorthorns".

Watson then played at halfback on both offense and defense for the 1920 Texas Longhorns football team, leading the unit to a perfect 9–0 record and the Southwest Conference championship. The season ended before the largest crowd to date in Texas football history with a 7–3 victory over a Texas A&M team that had not lost a game or allowed a point since 1918. Watson led a fourth-quarter touchdown drive that gave Texas the victory. Watson was described as "one of the most consistent ground-gainers the university ever had and records which he made still stand unequalled." Another Texas player recalled: "When Rats hit an open field, it was like dropping cottontail on a stove."

Aside from speed and elusiveness, Watson was known for his self confidence and determination. Texas coach Berry Whitaker later recalled, "[T]hey all remember Rats Watson. Maybe we've had better quarterbacks, but he had something.... Grady had a lot—well, quite a lot of confidence, and he'd go out and get things done." On the subject of confidence, Watson said: "I was cocky. Yes, plenty cocky. They say the good ones have to have confidence. Well, I never lacked it." In an odd strategy, Whitaker did not play Watson at the start of games. Whitaker justified his strategy, noting that "when I send Watson in, it's like a shot in the arm to the team."

While playing at Texas, Watson was also credited with opening up the forward passing game in the Southwest Conference. His favorite receiver was Hook McCullough.

Injuries limited Watson's playing time for Texas in 1921.

== Professional football ==
Watson played professional football as a quarterback for the Toledo Maroons, Kansas City Blues, Hammond Pros, and Buffalo Bisons in the National Football League (NFL). He appeared in 20 NFL games, 12 as a starter, from 1922 to 1927.

Watson also joined Jim Thorpe as part of a barnstorming group that toured the southwest United States after the 1922 season.

== Family and later years ==
After his football career ended, Watson held jobs as a salesman, football official, and justice of the peace. In 1936, he began working as an agent for the Texas Liquor Board. He began the job in the "still days" and became known as a "still expert." He was the liquor board's district supervisor at Beaumont, Texas, from 1936 to 1952. He was then reassigned to lead the Waco division. He retired from the liquor board in 1959 due to ill health.

Watson's health declined in later years, his lungs never fully recovering from the World War I gas attack. In 1959, when Watson was age 65, it was reported that "a short walk can leave him out of breath." In retirement, Watson lived in Galveston, Texas. His wife Loretta Watson predeceased him in 1961. Watson died in 1965 at age 71 at the Veterans Administration Hospital in Houston.
