= Arbuckle (surname) =

Arbuckle is a surname. Notable people with the surname include:

- Andrew Arbuckle (actor) (1887–1938), American actor, brother of Macklyn and cousin of Roscoe
- Andrew Arbuckle (politician) (1944–2025), Scottish journalist and Liberal Democrat politician
- Charles Arbuckle (born 1968), American football player
- David Arbuckle (born 1973), Scottish footballer
- Dick Arbuckle (born 1939), American college football coach
- Ernest C. Arbuckle (1912–1986), American business leader
- Gary Arbuckle (born 1984), Scottish football player
- James Arbuckle (1700 – c. 1742), Irish poet
- John Arbuckle (businessman) (1838–1912), American businessman
- John Arbuckle (politician), see 15th General Assembly of Prince Edward Island
- Jon Arbuckle, fictional owner of Garfield the cat
- Macklyn Arbuckle (1866–1931), American actor, brother of Andrew and cousin of Roscoe
- Matthew Arbuckle Sr. (1740–1781), American military officer of the 18th Century
- Matthew Arbuckle Jr. (1778–1851), American military officer of the 19th Century
- Phillip Arbuckle (1883–1932), American football coach
- Roscoe "Fatty" Arbuckle (1887–1933), American silent film comedian
- Samuel Arbuckle (1804–1874), Californian politician
- Steve Arbuckle, Canadian actor
- Tiffany Arbuckle, the name of Christian singer Plumb
