= Arbuckle House =

Arbuckle House may refer to:

== United States ==
- Alexander W. Arbuckle I House, historic home located near Lewisburg, Greenbrier County, West Virginia, NRHP-listed
- Arbuckle Place, Assawoman, Virginia, NRHP-listed
- George Arbuckle House, Salt Lake City, Utah, NRHP-listed
- John E. Arbuckle House, historic home located at Glenville, Gilmer County, West Virginia, NRHP-listed

== See also ==
- Arbuckle (disambiguation)
