= 1920 Rice Owls football team =

American college football season

1920 Rice Owls football
- Conference: Southwest Conference
- Record: 4–2–2 (2–2–1 SWC)
- Head coach: Philip Arbuckle (8th season)
- Captain: Jim Dain
- Home stadium: Rice Field

1920 Southwest Conference football standings
	Conf.					Overall
Team	W		L		T	W		L		T
Texas $	5	–	0	–	0	9	–	0	–	0
Texas A&M	5	–	1	–	0	6	–	1	–	1
Arkansas	2	–	0	–	1	3	–	2	–	2
Rice	2	–	2	–	1	4	–	2	–	2
Baylor	1	–	2	–	1	4	–	4	–	1
SMU	0	–	4	–	1	3	–	5	–	2
Phillips	0	–	3	–	0	4	–	4	–	2
Oklahoma A&M	0	–	3	–	0	0	–	7	–	1
$ – Conference champion

The 1920 Rice Owls football team was an American football team that represented Rice Institute as a member of the Southwest Conference (SWC) during the 1920 college football season. In its eighth season under head coach Philip Arbuckle, the team compiled a 4–2–2 record (2–2–1 against SWC opponents), and outscored opponents by a total of 105 to 28.

== Schedule ==
Date	Opponent	Site	Result	Attendance	Source
October 9	Baylor	Rice Field; Houston, TX	W 28–0		
October 16	at Tulane*	Heinemann Park; New Orleans, LA	T 0–0		
October 23	Southwestern (TX)*	Rice Field; Houston, TX	W 19–0		
October 30	Texas	Rice Field; Houston, TX (rivalry)	L 0–21		
November 6	at SMU	Armstrong Field; Dallas, TX (rivalry)	W 10–0	3,000	
November 15	at Texas A&M	Kyle Field; College Station, TX	L 0–7		
November 19	Southwest Texas State*	Rice Field; Houston, TX	W 48–0		
November 25	Arkansas	Rice Field; Houston, TX	T 0–0	5,000	
*Non-conference game
