= Fort Arbuckle =

Fort Arbuckle may refer to:

- Fort Arbuckle (Oklahoma) in Garvin County, Oklahoma
- Fort Arbuckle (Florida)
- Old Fort Arbuckle in Tulsa County, Oklahoma
