= 1920 Baylor Bears football team =

American college football season

1920 Baylor Bears football
- Conference: Southwest Conference
- Record: 4–4–1 (1–2–1 SWC)
- Head coach: Frank Bridges (1st season)
- Captain: E. M. Dotson
- Home stadium: Carroll Field, Cotton Palace

1920 Southwest Conference football standings
	Conf.					Overall
Team	W		L		T	W		L		T
Texas $	5	–	0	–	0	9	–	0	–	0
Texas A&M	5	–	1	–	0	6	–	1	–	1
Arkansas	2	–	0	–	1	3	–	2	–	2
Rice	2	–	2	–	1	4	–	2	–	2
Baylor	1	–	2	–	1	4	–	4	–	1
SMU	0	–	4	–	1	3	–	5	–	2
Phillips	0	–	3	–	0	4	–	4	–	2
Oklahoma A&M	0	–	3	–	0	0	–	7	–	1
$ – Conference champion

The 1920 Baylor Bears football team was an American football team that represented Baylor University as a member of the Southwest Conference (SWC) during the 1920 college football season. In its first season under head coach Frank Bridges, the team compiled a 4–4–1 record and was outscored by a total of 89 to 65.

== Schedule ==
Date	Opponent	Site	Result	Source
October 2	Austin*	Carroll Field; Waco, TX	W 9–0	
October 9	at Rice	Rice Field; Houston, TX	L 0–28	
October 16	Trinity (TX)*	Carroll Field; Waco, TX	W 20–6	
October 22	at Oklahoma A&M	Lewis Field; Stillwater, OK	W 7–0	
October 30	Southwestern (TX)*	Cotton Palace; Waco, TX	L 0–7	
November 6	Texas A&M	Cotton Palace; Waco, TX (rivalry)	L 0–24	
November 13	TCU*	Cotton Palace; Waco, TX (rivalry)	L 9–21	
November 19	Howard Payne*	Carroll Field; Waco, TX	W 20–3	
November 25	at SMU	Armstrong Field; Dallas, TX	T 0–0	
*Non-conference game
