= 1920 SMU Mustangs football team =

American college football season

1920 SMU Mustangs football
- Conference: Southwest Conference
- Record: 3–5–2 (0–4–1 SWC)
- Head coach: J. Burton Rix (4th season)
- Captain: John Lee Brooks
- Home stadium: Armstrong Field, State Fair gridiron

1920 Southwest Conference football standings
	Conf.					Overall
Team	W		L		T	W		L		T
Texas $	5	–	0	–	0	9	–	0	–	0
Texas A&M	5	–	1	–	0	6	–	1	–	1
Arkansas	2	–	0	–	1	3	–	2	–	2
Rice	2	–	2	–	1	4	–	2	–	2
Baylor	1	–	2	–	1	4	–	4	–	1
SMU	0	–	4	–	1	3	–	5	–	2
Phillips	0	–	3	–	0	4	–	4	–	2
Oklahoma A&M	0	–	3	–	0	0	–	7	–	1
$ – Conference champion

The 1920 SMU Mustangs football team was an American football team that represented Southern Methodist University (SMU) as a member of the Southwest Conference (SWC) during the 1920 college football season. In its fourth season under head coach J. Burton Rix, the team compiled an overall record of 3–5–2 record with a mark of 0–4–1 in conference play and outscored opponents by a total of 125 to 90. The team played its home games at Armstrong Field in Dallas.

== Schedule ==
Date	Opponent	Site	Result	Attendance	Source
September 25	Daniel Baker*	Armstrong Field; Dallas, TX	W 70–0		
October 2	Simmons (TX)*	Armstrong Field; Dallas, TX	T 0–0		
October 9	Texas A&M	Armstrong Field; Dallas, TX	L 0–3		
October 15	Howard Payne*	Armstrong Field; Dallas, TX	W 14–0		
October 23	Arkansas	State Fair gridiron; Dallas, TX	L 0–6		
October 30	Trinity (TX)*	Armstrong Field; Dallas, TX	W 38–7		
November 6	Rice	Armstrong Field; Dallas, TX (rivalry)	L 0–10	3,000	
November 13	at Texas	Clark Field; Austin, TX	L 3–21		
November 18	Austin*	Armstrong Field; Dallas, TX	L 0–42		
November 25	Baylor	Armstrong Field; Dallas, TX	T 0–0		
*Non-conference game
