= John E. Arbuckle House =

Historic house in West Virginia, United States

- U.S. National Register of Historic Places
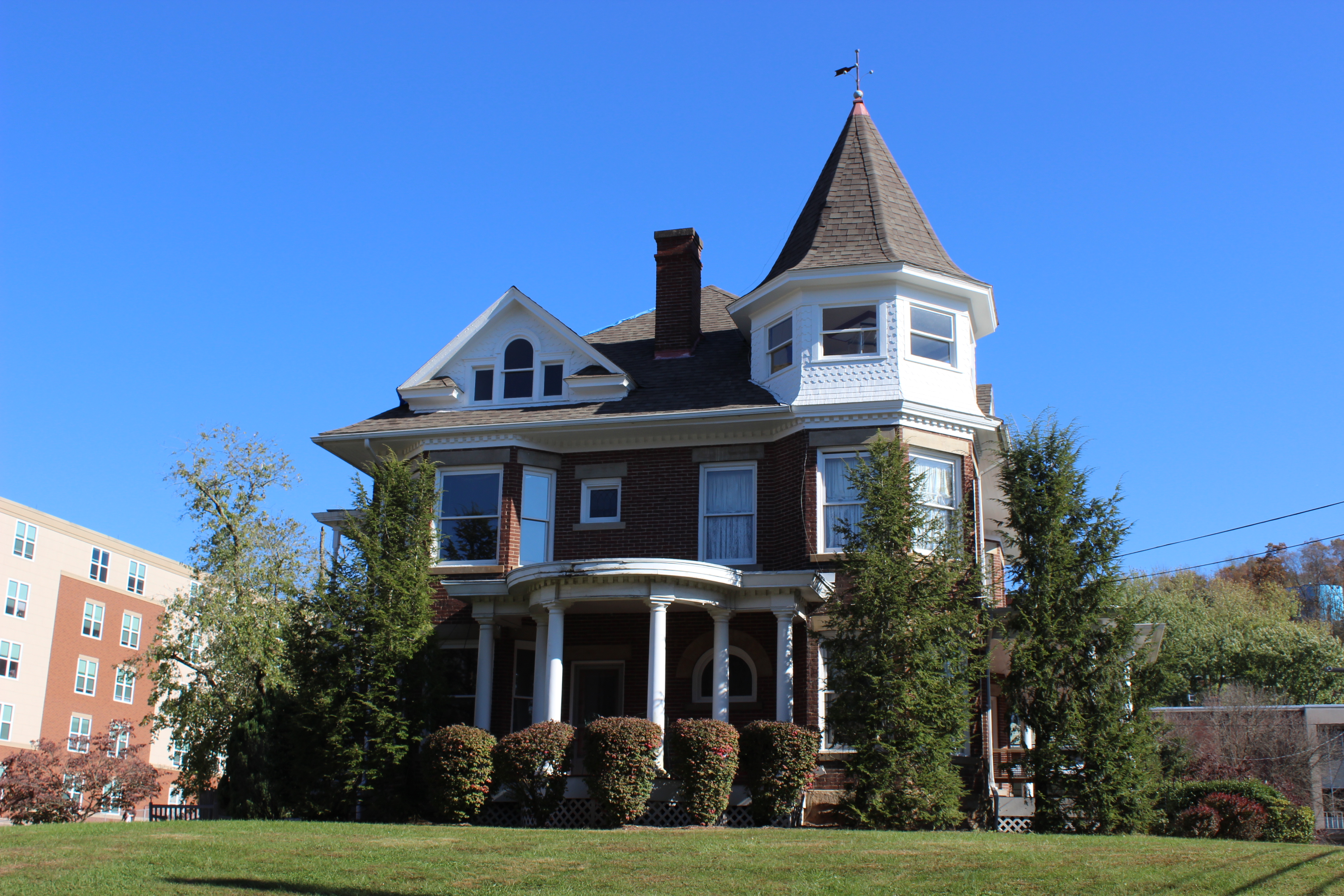

- Location within West Virginia Location within the United States
- Location: 213 Court St., Glenville, West Virginia
- Coordinates: 38°56′5″N 80°50′8″W
- Area: less than one acre
- Architect: West, A.N.
- Architectural style: Queen Anne
- NRHP reference No.: 91001729
- Added to NRHP: November 21, 1991

John E. Arbuckle House, also known as Glenville State University Alumni Center, is a historic home located at Glenville, Gilmer County, West Virginia. It was built in 1910, and is a 2 1/2-story Queen Anne-style building. It is a wood-frame structure, with a brick veneer. It features an octagonal tower and classical porches.

It was listed on the National Register of Historic Places in 1991.
