= David Arbuckle =

Scottish footballer (born 1973)

Personal information
- Full name: David Arbuckle
- Date of birth: 12 August 1973 (age 53)
- Place of birth: Bellshill, Scotland
- Position: Midfielder

Youth career
- Rutherglen Glencairn

Senior career*
Years	Team	Apps	(Gls)
1992	Airdrieonians	0	(0)
- Gartferry Amateurs
1995–1998	Queen's Park	101	(8)
1998–2001	Arbroath	71	(7)
- Shotts Bonn Accord
- * Club domestic league appearances and goals

David Arbuckle (born 12 August 1973) is a Scottish retired footballer who made over 100 appearances as a midfielder in the Scottish League for Queen's Park.

== Honours ==
Arbroath

- Scottish League Second Division second-place promotion: 2000–01
