= 1920 Texas A&M Aggies football team =

American college football season

1920 Texas A&M Aggies football
- Conference: Southwest Conference
- Record: 6–1–1 (5–1 SWC)
- Head coach: Dana X. Bible (3rd season)
- Home stadium: Kyle Field

1920 Southwest Conference football standings
	Conf.					Overall
Team	W		L		T	W		L		T
Texas $	5	–	0	–	0	9	–	0	–	0
Texas A&M	5	–	1	–	0	6	–	1	–	1
Arkansas	2	–	0	–	1	3	–	2	–	2
Rice	2	–	2	–	1	4	–	2	–	2
Baylor	1	–	2	–	1	4	–	4	–	1
SMU	0	–	4	–	1	3	–	5	–	2
Phillips	0	–	3	–	0	4	–	4	–	2
Oklahoma A&M	0	–	3	–	0	0	–	7	–	1
$ – Conference champion

The 1920 Texas A&M Aggies football team represented the Agricultural and Mechanical College of Texas—now known as Texas A&M University—as a member of the Southwest Conference (SWC) during the 1920 college football season. In their third year under head coach Dana X. Bible, the team compiled an overall record of 6–1–1, with a mark of 5–1 in conference play, and finished second in the SWC.

== Schedule ==
Date	Opponent	Site	Result	Attendance	Source
October 1	Daniel Baker*	Kyle Field; College Station, TX	W 110–0		
October 9	at SMU	Armstrong Field; Dallas, TX	W 3–0		
October 15	LSU*	Kyle Field; College Station, TX (rivalry)	T 0–0		
October 22	Phillips	Kyle Field; College Station, TX	W 47–0		
October 30	at Oklahoma A&M	Lewis Field; Stillwater, OK	W 35–0		
November 6	at Baylor	Cotton Palace; Waco, TX (rivalry)	W 24–0	15,000	
November 15	Rice	Kyle Field; College Station, TX	W 7–0		
November 25	at Texas	Clark Field; Austin, TX (rivalry)	L 3–7		
*Non-conference game
