= Dick Arbuckle =

American football player and coach (born 1939)

Biographical details
- Born: May 15, 1939 (age 87); Los Angeles, California, U.S.
- Education: University of Oregon (1961)

Playing career

Football
- 1959–1960: Oregon
- Positions: Quarterback, safety

Coaching career (HC unless noted)
- 1961–1962: North Eugene HS (OR) (assistant)
- 1963–1964: Oregon City HS (OR)
- 1966–1973: Sheldon HS (OR)
- 1974–1976: Oregon (OLB)
- 1977–1980: Sheldon HS (OR)
- 1981–1982: Oregon Tech
- 1983–1984: Western Oregon
- 1985–1986: Oregon State (OL)
- 1987–1989: Boise State (OC)
- 1990–1991: California (WR/ST)
- 1992–2000: Arizona State (TE/ST)
- 2005–2009: Sheldon HS (OR) (assistant)
- 2010: Montana (ST)

Head coaching record
- Overall: 20–17–2 (college)

Accomplishments and honors

Championships
- 2 Evergreen (1981–1982)

Dick Arbuckle (born May 15, 1939) is an American former football coach. He served as the head football coach at Western Oregon University and Oregon Institute of Technology, Klamath Falls.

Arbuckle's Sheldon High School teams had notable success, including the 1980 team that finished undefeated in District 5AAA play, and whose only loss came to eventual state champion Beaverton, on the way to a 12-1 season.

Arbuckle served as the head football coach at Oregon Tech from 1981 to 1982, compiling a record of 14–5. He then served as the Western Oregon head coach from 1983 to 1984, earning a record of 6–12–2.

He would later go on to serve on a number Division I staffs, including two stints as an assistant for Bruce Snyder at Cal and Arizona State.

== Head coaching record ==
=== College ===
Year	Team	Overall	Conference	Standing	Bowl/playoffs
Oregon Tech Hustlin' Owls (Evergreen Conference) (1981–1982)
1981	Oregon Tech	7–2	5–0	1st	
1982	Oregon Tech	7–2	4–1	T–1st	
Oregon Tech:		14–5	9–1		
Western Oregon Wolves (Evergreen Conference) (1983–1984)
1983	Western Oregon	3–7	2–5	T–6th	
1984	Western Oregon	3–5–2	3–4	T–5th	
Western Oregon:		6–12–2	5–9		
Total:		20–17–2			
National championship Conference title Conference division title or championship game berth
