= 1920 Arkansas Razorbacks football team =

American college football season

1920 Arkansas Razorbacks football
- Conference: Southwest Conference
- Record: 3–2–2 (2–0–1 SWC)
- Head coach: George McLaren (1st season)
- Captain: J. Tate McGill
- Home stadium: The Hill

1920 Southwest Conference football standings
	Conf.					Overall
Team	W		L		T	W		L		T
Texas $	5	–	0	–	0	9	–	0	–	0
Texas A&M	5	–	1	–	0	6	–	1	–	1
Arkansas	2	–	0	–	1	3	–	2	–	2
Rice	2	–	2	–	1	4	–	2	–	2
Baylor	1	–	2	–	1	4	–	4	–	1
SMU	0	–	4	–	1	3	–	5	–	2
Phillips	0	–	3	–	0	4	–	4	–	2
Oklahoma A&M	0	–	3	–	0	0	–	7	–	1
$ – Conference champion

The 1920 Arkansas Razorbacks football team represented the University of Arkansas in the Southwest Conference (SWC) during the 1920 college football season. In their first year under head coach George McLaren, the Razorbacks compiled a 3–2–2 record (2–0–1 against SWC opponents), finished in third place in the SWC, shut out five of their nine opponents, and outscored all opponents by a combined total of 42 to 22.

== Schedule ==
Date	Time	Opponent	Site	Result	Attendance	Source
October 9		Hendrix*	The Hill; Fayetteville, AR	T 0–0		
October 16		TCU*	The Hill; Fayetteville, AR	L 2–19		
October 23	3:00 p.m.	at SMU	State Fair gridiron; Dallas, TX	W 6–0		
October 30		Missouri Mines*	The Hill; Fayetteville, AR	W 14–0		
November 6		vs. LSU*	Fair Grounds; Shreveport, LA (rivalry)	L 0–3		
November 13		at Phillips	Alton Field; Enid, OK	W 20–0		
November 25		at Rice	Rice Field; Houston, TX	T 0–0	5,000	
*Non-conference game; All times are in Central time
