= George Arbuckle House =

Historic house in Salt Lake City, Utah, U.S.

- U.S. National Register of Historic Places
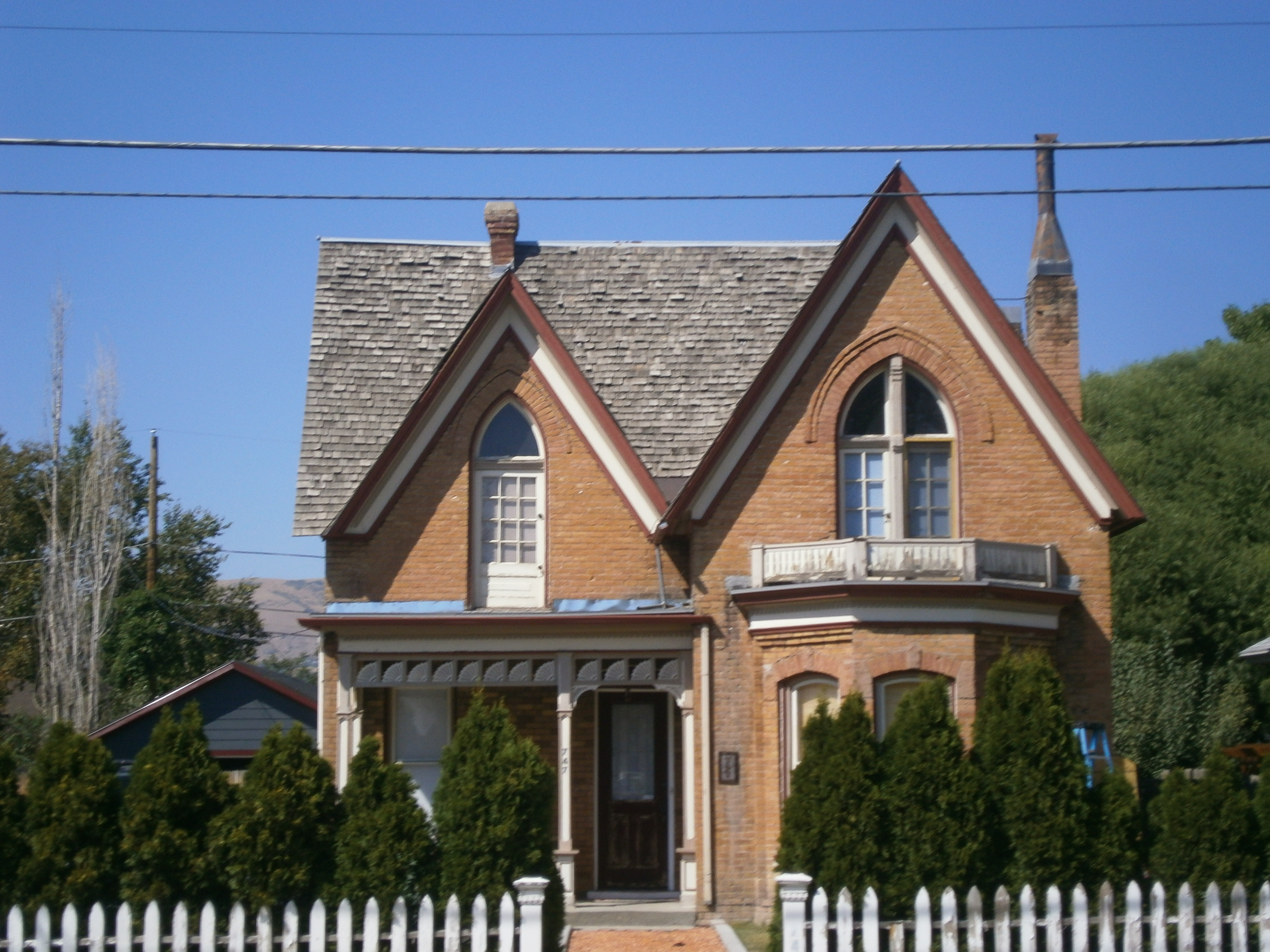

- Location within Utah Location within the United States
- Location: 747 E. 17th South, Salt Lake City, Utah
- Coordinates: 40°44′02″N 111°52′08″W
- Area: less than one acre
- Built: c.1890
- Architectural style: Late Gothic Revival
- NRHP reference No.: 82004130
- Added to NRHP: February 12, 1982

The George Arbuckle House, at 747 E. 17th South in Salt Lake City, Utah, was built around 1890. It was listed on the National Register of Historic Places in 1982.

It is a one-and-a-half-story brick, Late Gothic Revival-style house, with two steep front-facing gables.

It is located in the Sugar House neighborhood.
