= 1920 Phillips Haymakers football team =

American college football season

1920 Phillips Haymakers football
- Conference: Southwest Conference
- Record: 4–4–2 (0–3 SWC)
- Head coach: John Maulbetsch (4th season)
- Captain: Ted Kurtz
- Home stadium: Alton Field

1920 Southwest Conference football standings
	Conf.					Overall
Team	W		L		T	W		L		T
Texas $	5	–	0	–	0	9	–	0	–	0
Texas A&M	5	–	1	–	0	6	–	1	–	1
Arkansas	2	–	0	–	1	3	–	2	–	2
Rice	2	–	2	–	1	4	–	2	–	2
Baylor	1	–	2	–	1	4	–	4	–	1
SMU	0	–	4	–	1	3	–	5	–	2
Phillips	0	–	3	–	0	4	–	4	–	2
Oklahoma A&M	0	–	3	–	0	0	–	7	–	1
$ – Conference champion

The 1920 Phillips Haymakers football team represented Phillips University during the 1920 college football season. John Maulbetsch coached the team. Phillips joined the Southwest Conference for the 1920 season and was outscored 97–0 in conference play against Texas A&M (47–0), Texas (27–0), and Arkansas (20–0). The Galveston Daily News noted that Maulbetsch's 1920 team could not "compare with the strong team" he surprised Texas with in 1919. At the end of the 1920 season, Phillips withdrew from the Southwest Conference, and Maulbetsch accepted a new position at Oklahoma A&M.

In December 1919, Ted Kurtz was selected as captain of the 1920 team.

== Schedule ==
Date	Time	Opponent	Site	Result	Source
September 25		Southwestern Normal (OK)*	Association Park; Enid, OK	W 35–0	
October 1		at Northwestern Normal (OK)*	Enid, OK	W 27–7	
October 8		Haskell*	Enid, OK	W 7–6	
October 16		Simmons (TX)*	Alton Field; Enid, OK	W 13–7	
October 22		at Texas A&M	Kyle Field; College Station, TX	L 0–47	
October 30	3:00 p.m.	at TCU*	Panther Park; Fort Worth, TX	L 0–3	
November 5		at Texas	Clark Field; Austin, TX	L 0–27	
November 13		Arkansas	Enid, OK	L 0–20	
November 19		Kendall*	Alton Field; Enid, OK	T 0–0	
November 25		Central State Normal*	Enid, OK	T 7–7	
*Non-conference game; All times are in Central time
