= 1920 Kendall Orange and Black football team =

American college football season

1920 Kendall Orange and Black football

OIC champion
- Conference: Oklahoma Intercollegiate Conference
- Record: 10–0–1 (6–0–1 OIC)
- Head coach: Francis Schmidt (2nd season)
- Home stadium: McNulty Park

The Kendall Orange and Black football team represented Henry Kendall College, which was renamed the University of Tulsa on 1920, during the 1920 college football season. In their second year under head coach Francis Schmidt, the Orange and Black compiled a 10–0–1 record, won the Oklahoma Intercollegiate Conference championship, and outscored their opponents by a total of 621 to 21. The team won its first two games by scores of 121–0 over St. Gregory's and 151–0 over Northeastern Oklahoma A&M and shut out nine of eleven opponents. Schmidt was later inducted into the College Football Hall of Fame.

== Schedule ==
Date	Opponent	Site	Result	Attendance	Source
September 25	St. Gregory's*	McNulty Park; Tulsa, OK	W 121–0		
September 29	Northeastern Oklahoma A&M*	McNulty Park; Tulsa, OK	W 151–0		
October 2	Chilocco*	McNulty Park; Tulsa, OK	W 88–0		
October 9	Oklahoma A&M	McNulty Park; Tulsa, OK (rivalry)	W 20–14	5,000	
October 16	at East Central	Ada, OK	W 10–0		
October 23	at Central State Teachers	Edmond, OK	W 3–0		
October 30	Northwestern Oklahoma State	McNulty Park; Tulsa, OK	W 14–7		
November 6	Oklahoma Baptist	McNulty Park; Tulsa, OK	W 81–0		
November 11	Kingfisher	McNulty Park; Tulsa, OK	W 88–0		
November 19	at Phillips	Alton Field; Enid, OK	T 0–0		
November 26	Missouri Mines*	McNulty Park; Tulsa, OK	W 45–0		
*Non-conference game
