= Arbuckle, Pennsylvania =

Unincorporated community in Pennsylvania, US

- Unincorporated community
- Location within Pennsylvania Location within the United States
- Coordinates: 41°58′58″N 79°51′50″W
- Country: United States
- State: Pennsylvania
- County: Erie
- Elevation: 1,280 ft (390 m)
- Time zone: UTC-5 (Eastern (EST))
  - Summer (DST): UTC-4 (EDT)
- Area code: 814
- GNIS feature ID: 1168368

Arbuckle is an unincorporated community in Erie County, Pennsylvania, United States.

== Geography ==
Arbuckle is located in Erie County in northwestern Pennsylvania, within the Lake Erie region of the state. The community lies at an elevation of approximately 1,280 feet (390 m) above sea level and falls within the 814 area code region.
