= 1920 Oklahoma A&M Aggies football team =

American college football season

1920 Oklahoma A&M Aggies football
- Conference: Southwest Conference
- Record: 0–7–1 (0–3 SWC)
- Head coach: Jim Pixlee (2nd season)
- Captain: Carl M. Voyles
- Home stadium: Lewis Field

1920 Southwest Conference football standings
| | Conf. | | | | | Overall |
| Team | W | | L | | T | W | | L | | T |
|---|---|---|---|---|---|---|---|---|---|---|
| Texas $ | 5 | – | 0 | – | 0 | 9 | – | 0 | – | 0 |
| Texas A&M | 5 | – | 1 | – | 0 | 6 | – | 1 | – | 1 |
| Arkansas | 2 | – | 0 | – | 1 | 3 | – | 2 | – | 2 |
| Rice | 2 | – | 2 | – | 1 | 4 | – | 2 | – | 2 |
| Baylor | 1 | – | 2 | – | 1 | 4 | – | 4 | – | 1 |
| SMU | 0 | – | 4 | – | 1 | 3 | – | 5 | – | 2 |
| Phillips | 0 | – | 3 | – | 0 | 4 | – | 4 | – | 2 |
| Oklahoma A&M | 0 | – | 3 | – | 0 | 0 | – | 7 | – | 1 |
$ – Conference champion

The 1920 Oklahoma A&M Aggies football team represented Oklahoma A&M College in the 1920 college football season. This was the 20th year of football at A&M and the second under Jim Pixlee. The Aggies played their home games at Lewis Field in Stillwater, Oklahoma. They finished the season 0–7–1, 0–3 in the Southwest Conference.

== Schedule ==
| Date | Time | Opponent | Site | Result | Attendance | Source |
|---|---|---|---|---|---|---|
| October 2 | | Southwestern (KS)* | Lewis Field; Stillwater, OK | T 7–7 | | |
| October 9 | | at Kendall* | McNulty Park; Tulsa, OK (rivalry) | L 14–20 | 5,000 | |
| October 16 | | vs. Texas | Fair Park Stadium; Dallas, TX | L 0–21 | 8,000 | |
| October 22 | | Baylor | Lewis Field; Stillwater, OK | L 0–7 | | |
| October 30 | | Texas A&M^{†} | Lewis Field; Stillwater, OK | L 0–35 | | |
| November 13 | | Oklahoma* | Lewis Field; Stillwater, OK (Bedlam) | L 0–36 | | |
| November 20 | 2:30 p.m. | vs. Haskell* | Association Park; Kansas City, MO | L 7–33 | 5,000 | |
| November 25 | | vs. Colorado* | Western League Park; Oklahoma City, OK | L 7–40 | | |
*Non-conference game; ^{†}Homecoming
