= Berry Whitaker =

American football and basketball coach (1890–1984)

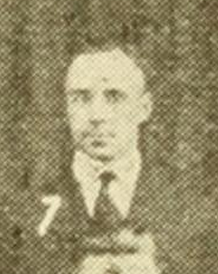
- Whitaker c. 1921 at Texas

Biographical details
- Born: October 22, 1890; Anderson, Indiana, U.S.
- Died: January 10, 1984 (aged 93); San Antonio, Texas, U.S.

Playing career

Football
- 1911–1913: Indiana

Coaching career (HC unless noted)

Football
- 1914–1916: Stephen F. Austin HS (TX)
- 1919: Texas (assistant)
- 1920–1922: Texas

Basketball
- 1919–1920: Texas

Head coaching record
- Overall: 22–3–1 (college football); 10–6 (college basketball)

Accomplishments and honors

Championships
- Football; 1 SWC (1920)

Berry M. Whitaker (October 22, 1890 – January 10, 1984) was an American college football and college basketball coach. He also organized one of the nation's first university intramural programs at The University of Texas at Austin. Whitaker served as the school's football head coach from 1920 to 1922 and as its basketball head coach for the 1920 season. Whitaker retired from coaching after the 1922 season, citing the physical toll that the stress of defeats took on him and also his desire to return to the work he most enjoyed—directing the university's intramural sports program, which he would do until 1960. The UT intramural fields were named in Whitaker's honor following their relocation and expansion in 1967. Whitaker was inducted into the Longhorn Hall of Honor in 1977.

A native of Anderson, Indiana, Whitaker played college football at Indiana University Bloomington.

== Head coaching record ==
=== College football ===
Year	Team	Overall	Conference	Standing	Bowl/playoffs
Texas Longhorns (Southwest Conference) (1920–1922)
1920	Texas	9–0	5–0	1st	
1921	Texas	6–1–1	1–0–1	2nd	
1922	Texas	7–2	2–1	2nd	
Texas:		22–3–1	8–1–1		
Total:		22–3–1			
National championship Conference title Conference division title or championship game berth

=== College basketball ===
Record table
Season	Team	Overall	Conference	Standing	Postseason
Texas Longhorns (Southwest Conference) (1920)
1919–20	Texas	10–6	4–6	3rd	
Texas:		10–6 (.625)	4–6 (.400)		
Total:		10–6 (.625)			
