= Fort Arbuckle (Florida) =

Fort Arbuckle was a fort in Florida. Built in 1850, it was "part of the ring of civilian and military posts created to protect settlers in the interior of southwest Florida." The fort was named after Brigadier General Matthew Arbuckle, an Oklahoma fort commander. During the removal of the native Seminoles, 60 men, women, and children were brought to the fort and put on the steamer Fashion to be sent to New Orleans in February 1850. On May 15, 1850, the military withdrew all troops from the fort and it was abandoned. The site of the fort is now part of Avon Park Air Force Range; the exact location of the fort is unverified.
