= Jim Pixlee =

American football player and sports coach (1889–1967)

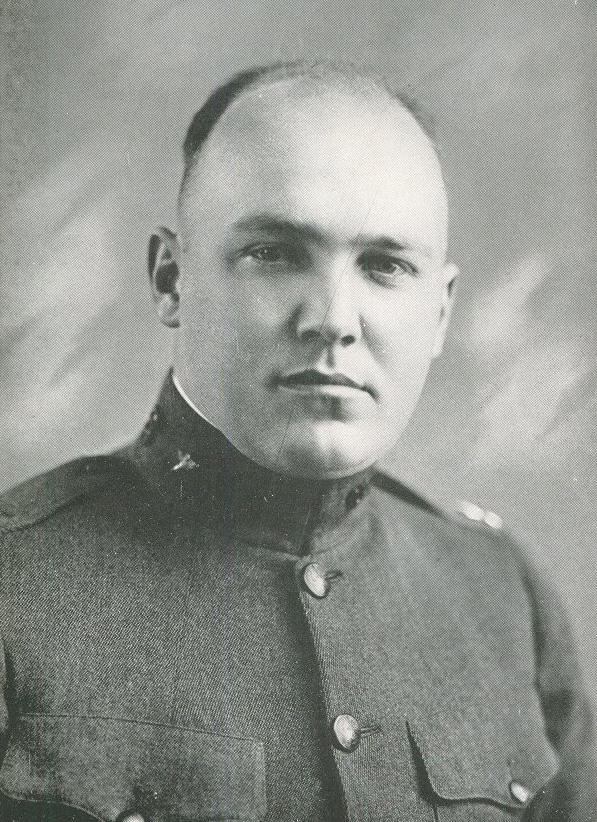
- Pixlee pictured in The Redskin 1920, Oklahoma A&M yearbook

Biographical details
- Born: March 29, 1889; Missouri, U.S.
- Died: February 17, 1967 (aged 77); Cameron, Missouri, U.S.

Playing career

Football
- 1909: Missouri
- 1911–1912: Missouri
- Position: End

Coaching career (HC unless noted)

Football
- 1914–1916: Missouri Wesleyan
- 1919–1920: Oklahoma A&M
- 1922–1928: Westminster (MO)
- 1929–1937: George Washington

Basketball
- 1919–1921: Oklahoma A&M
- 1922–1929: Westminster (MO)
- 1930–1932: George Washington
- 1934–1935: George Washington

Administrative career (AD unless noted)
- 1914–1917: Missouri Wesleyan
- 1929–1938: George Washington

Accomplishments and honors

Championships
- Football; 1 MIAA (1914); 2 MCAU (1924, 1926)

James Ebenezzar "Possum Jim" Pixlee (March 29, 1889 – February 17, 1967) was an American college football and college basketball coach and athletics administrator. He served as the head football coach at Missouri Wesleyan College from 1914 to 1916, Oklahoma Agricultural and Mechanical College—now known as Oklahoma State University–Stillwater— frin 1919 to 1920, Westminster College in Fulton, Missouri from 1922 to 1928, and George Washington University from 1929 to 1937. Pixlee was also the head basketball coach at Oklahoma A&M (1919–1921), Westminster (1922–1929), and George Washington (1930–1932).

Pixlee attended the University of Missouri, where he lettered in football during the 1909, 1911, and 1912 seasons. He was head coach of the Oklahoma A&M Aggies for the 1919 and 1920 football seasons. During this period, the team won three of their 16 games. By 1929 Pixlee was director of athletics at Missouri's Westminster College.

In 1929, Pixlee took over the head coaching position of the George Washington Colonials, starting with an 0–8 season. He went on to win more football games than any other coach in George Washington's history, leading the Colonials to records crowds and coaching Alphonse "Tuffy" Leemans, whom David Holt described as "perhaps GW's greatest athlete ever". Pixlee left that position in 1937.

Pixlee was married to Blossom Pixlee. He died on February 17, 1967, at his home in Cameron, Missouri.

== Head coaching record ==
=== Football ===
Year	Team	Overall	Conference	Standing
Missouri Wesleyan Owls (Missouri Intercollegiate Athletic Association) (1914–1916)
1914	Missouri Wesleyan	6–2		
1915	Missouri Wesleyan		2–1–1	4th
1916	Missouri Wesleyan		2–3	5th
Missouri Wesleyan:				
Oklahoma A&M Aggies (Southwest Conference) (1919–1920)
1919	Oklahoma A&M	3–3–2	0–2	8th
1920	Oklahoma A&M	0–7–1	0–4	T–7th
Oklahoma A&M:		3–10–3	0–6	
Westminster Blue Jays (Missouri Intercollegiate Athletic Association) (1922–1923)
1922	Westminster	0–5–2	0–4–2	T–13th
1923	Westminster	3–5	2–5	9th
Westminster Blue Jays (Missouri College Athletic Union) (1924–1928)
1924	Westminster	9–0	7–0	1st
1925	Westminster	5–2	5–2	4th
1926	Westminster	7–1	7–0	1st
1927	Westminster	2–4–1	2–1	4th
1928	Westminster	6–2–1	3–1–1	3rd
Westminster:		32–19–4	26–13–1	
George Washington Colonials (Independent) (1929–1937)
1929	George Washington	0–8		
1930	George Washington	4–4–1		
1931	George Washington	5–2–1		
1932	George Washington	6–2–1		
1933	George Washington	5–3–1		
1934	George Washington	6–3–1		
1935	George Washington	6–3		
1936	George Washington	7–1–1		
1937	George Washington	3–4–1		
George Washington:		42–30–7		
Total:				
National championship Conference title Conference division title or championship game berth
