= Rice–Texas football rivalry =

American college football rivalry

- Rice Owls Texas Longhorns
- First meeting: October 17, 1914; Texas 41, Rice 0
- Latest meeting: September 2, 2023; Texas 37, Rice 10
- Next meeting: TBA

Statistics
- Total meetings: 97
- All-time series: Texas leads, 75–21–1
- Largest victory: Texas, 59–0 (1915)
- Longest win streak: Texas, 28 (1966–1993)
- Current win streak: Texas, 16 (1995–present)

Locations of Rice and Texas

The Rice–Texas football rivalry is an American college football rivalry between the Rice Owls and Texas Longhorns. Texas leads the series 75–21–1 through the 2023 season. The teams were conference rivals for 81 seasons in the Southwest Conference from 1915 through 1995. The Longhorns have largely dominated the series, as Rice has won only twice since 1960. 17 of the 21 Rice wins came between 1930 and 1960, a span over which it enjoyed a slight edge over the Longhorns.

== Game results ==
| Rice victories | Texas victories | Tie games |

| No. | Date | Location | Winner | Score |
|---|---|---|---|---|
| 1 | October 17, 1914 | Austin, TX | Texas | 41–0 |
| 2 | October 16, 1915 | Austin, TX | Texas | 59–0 |
| 3 | October 7, 1916 | Austin, TX | Texas | 16–2 |
| 4 | October 27, 1917 | Austin, TX | Rice | 13–0 |
| 5 | November 16, 1918 | Houston, TX | Texas | 14–0 |
| 6 | November 1, 1919 | Austin, TX | Texas | 32–7 |
| 7 | October 30, 1920 | Houston, TX | Texas | 21–0 |
| 8 | October 29, 1921 | Austin, TX | Texas | 56–0 |
| 9 | November 4, 1922 | Houston, TX | Texas | 29–0 |
| 10 | November 3, 1923 | Austin, TX | Texas | 27–0 |
| 11 | November 1, 1924 | Houston, TX | Rice | 19–6 |
| 12 | October 24, 1925 | Austin, TX | Texas | 27–6 |
| 13 | October 23, 1926 | Houston, TX | Texas | 20–0 |
| 14 | October 22, 1927 | Austin, TX | Texas | 27–0 |
| 15 | October 27, 1928 | Houston, TX | Texas | 13–6 |
| 16 | October 26, 1929 | Austin, TX | Texas | 29–0 |
| 17 | October 25, 1930 | Houston, TX | Rice | 6–0 |
| 18 | October 10, 1931 | Austin, TX | Rice | 7–0 |
| 19 | October 22, 1932 | Houston, TX | Texas | 18–6 |
| 20 | October 28, 1933 | Austin, TX | Texas | 18–0 |
| 21 | October 27, 1934 | Houston, TX | Rice | 20–9 |
| 22 | October 26, 1935 | Austin, TX | Rice | 28–19 |
| 23 | October 24, 1936 | Houston, TX | Rice | 7–0 |
| 24 | October 23, 1937 | Austin, TX | Rice | 14–7 |
| 25 | October 22, 1938 | Houston, TX | Rice | 13–6 |
| 26 | October 28, 1939 | Austin, TX | Texas | 26–12 |
| 27 | October 26, 1940 | Houston, TX | Rice | 13–0 |
| 28 | October 25, 1941 | Austin, TX | #2 Texas | 40–0 |
| 29 | October 24, 1942 | Houston, TX | #15 Texas | 12–7 |
| 30 | October 23, 1943 | Austin, TX | #16 Texas | 58–0 |
| 31 | October 28, 1944 | Houston, TX | Rice | 7–0 |
| 32 | October 27, 1945 | Austin, TX | Rice | 7–6 |
| 33 | October 26, 1946 | Houston, TX | #16 Rice | 18–13 |
| 34 | October 25, 1947 | Austin, TX | #3 Texas | 12–0 |
| 35 | October 23, 1948 | Houston, TX | Texas | 20–7 |
| 36 | October 22, 1949 | Austin, TX | #9 Rice | 17–15 |
| 37 | October 28, 1950 | Houston, TX | #7 Texas | 35–7 |
| 38 | October 27, 1951 | Austin, TX | #10 Texas | 14–6 |
| 39 | October 25, 1952 | Houston, TX | #20 Texas | 20–7 |
| 40 | October 24, 1953 | Austin, TX | Rice | 18–13 |
| 41 | October 23, 1954 | Houston, TX | Rice | 13–7 |
| 42 | October 22, 1955 | Austin, TX | Texas | 32–14 |
| 43 | October 27, 1956 | Houston, TX | Rice | 28–7 |
| 44 | October 26, 1957 | Austin, TX | #19 Texas | 19–14 |
| 45 | October 25, 1958 | Houston, TX | Rice | 34–7 |
| 46 | October 24, 1959 | Austin, TX | #3 Texas | 28–6 |
| 47 | October 22, 1960 | Houston, TX | #20 Rice | 7–0 |
| 48 | October 28, 1961 | Austin, TX | #3 Texas | 34–7 |
| 49 | October 27, 1962 | Houston, TX | Tie | 14–14 |

| No. | Date | Location | Winner | Score |
|---|---|---|---|---|
| 50 | October 26, 1963 | Austin, TX | #1 Texas | 10–6 |
| 51 | October 24, 1964 | Houston, TX | #6 Texas | 6–3 |
| 52 | October 23, 1965 | Austin, TX | Rice | 20–17 |
| 53 | October 22, 1966 | Houston, TX | Texas | 14–6 |
| 54 | October 28, 1967 | Austin, TX | Texas | 28–6 |
| 55 | October 26, 1968 | Houston, TX | #13 Texas | 38–14 |
| 56 | October 25, 1969 | Austin, TX | #2 Texas | 31–0 |
| 57 | October 24, 1970 | Houston, TX | #2 Texas | 45–21 |
| 58 | October 23, 1971 | Austin, TX | #16 Texas | 39–10 |
| 59 | October 28, 1972 | Houston, TX | #10 Texas | 45–9 |
| 60 | October 27, 1973 | Austin, TX | #19 Texas | 55–13 |
| 61 | October 26, 1974 | Houston, TX | #13 Texas | 27–6 |
| 62 | October 25, 1975 | Austin, TX | #8 Texas | 41–9 |
| 63 | October 2, 1976 | Houston, TX | Texas | 42–15 |
| 64 | October 1, 1977 | Austin, TX | #8 Texas | 72–15 |
| 65 | September 16, 1978 | Houston, TX | #7 Texas | 34–0 |
| 66 | October 6, 1979 | Austin, TX | #4 Texas | 26–9 |
| 67 | October 4, 1980 | Houston, TX | #5 Texas | 41–28 |
| 68 | September 12, 1981 | Austin, TX | #8 Texas | 31–3 |
| 69 | October 2, 1982 | Houston, TX | #15 Texas | 34–7 |
| 70 | October 1, 1983 | Austin, TX | #2 Texas | 42–6 |
| 71 | October 6, 1984 | Houston, TX | #1 Texas | 38–13 |
| 72 | October 5, 1985 | Austin, TX | #20 Texas | 44–16 |
| 73 | October 4, 1986 | Houston, TX | Texas | 17–14 |
| 74 | October 3, 1987 | Austin, TX | Texas | 45–26 |
| 75 | October 1, 1988 | Houston, TX | Texas | 20–13 |
| 76 | October 7, 1989 | Austin, TX | Texas | 31–30 |
| 77 | October 6, 1990 | Houston, TX | Texas | 26–10 |
| 78 | October 5, 1991 | Austin, TX | Texas | 28–7 |
| 79 | October 3, 1992 | Houston, TX | Texas | 23–21 |
| 80 | October 2, 1993 | Austin, TX | Texas | 55–38 |
| 81 | October 16, 1994 | Houston, TX | Rice | 19–17 |
| 82 | October 7, 1995 | Austin, TX | #20 Texas | 37–13 |
| 83 | September 27, 1997 | Houston, TX | Texas | 38–31 |
| 84 | September 26, 1998 | Austin, TX | Texas | 59–21 |
| 85 | September 18, 1999 | Austin, TX | Texas | 18–13 |
| 86 | September 20, 2003 | Houston, TX | #13 Texas | 48–7 |
| 87 | September 25, 2004 | Austin, TX | #5 Texas | 35–13 |
| 88 | September 17, 2005 | Austin, TX | #2 Texas | 51–10 |
| 89 | September 16, 2006 | Houston, TX | #8 Texas | 52–7 |
| 90 | September 22, 2007 | Austin, TX | #7 Texas | 58–14 |
| 91 | September 20, 2008 | Austin, TX | #7 Texas | 52–10 |
| 92 | September 4, 2010 | Houston, TX | #5 Texas | 34–17 |
| 93 | September 3, 2011 | Austin, TX | #24 Texas | 34–9 |
| 94 | September 12, 2015 | Austin, TX | Texas | 42–28 |
| 95 | September 14, 2019 | Houston, TX | #12 Texas | 48–13 |
| 96 | September 18, 2021 | Austin, TX | Texas | 58–0 |
| 97 | September 2, 2023 | Austin, TX | #11 Texas | 37–10 |
Series: Texas leads 75–21–1

=== Results by location ===
As of November 3, 2023

| City | Games | Texas victories | Rice victories | Ties |
|---|---|---|---|---|
| Austin | 53 | 45 | 8 | 0 |
| Houston | 44 | 30 | 13 | 1 |

== John F. Kennedy speech ==
On September 12, 1962, Rice Stadium hosted the speech in which President John F. Kennedy challenged Americans to meet his goal, set the previous year, to send a man to the Moon by the end of the decade. In the speech, he used a reference to the Rice-Texas rivalry to help frame his rhetoric:

But why, some say, the Moon? Why choose this as our goal? And they may well ask, why climb the highest mountain? Why, 35 years ago, fly the Atlantic? Why does Rice play Texas? We choose to go to the Moon! We choose to go to the Moon in this decade and do the other things, not because they are easy, but because they are hard, because that goal will serve to organize and measure the best of our energies and skills, because that challenge is one that we are willing to accept, one we are unwilling to postpone, and one which we intend to win, and the others, too.

Ironically, at the time of the speech the rivalry had been relatively close to even, as Texas had won 28 of the games up to that point compared to 19 Rice victories. But the soundbite proved to be rather prescient, as unranked and winless Rice would play undefeated #1 Texas to a 14 to 14 tie just over a month later in Houston. Rice would get their first win since the quote a few seasons later, upsetting #5 Texas in Austin. Following that victory however, Texas would win the next 28 games in the series, which is tied for the ninth-longest streak in NCAA Division I history and tied for the sixth-longest between conference opponents. Rice would finally snap the streak in 1994 with a 19–17 victory. Two seasons later, the Southwest Conference dissolved and the rivals joined separate conferences (Texas to the Big 12 and Rice to the WAC). The teams have played intermittently since 1995, with Texas winning each of the 15 contests as of 2023.

== See also ==
- List of NCAA college football rivalry games
