= John Maulbetsch =

American football player and multi-sport coach (1890–1950)

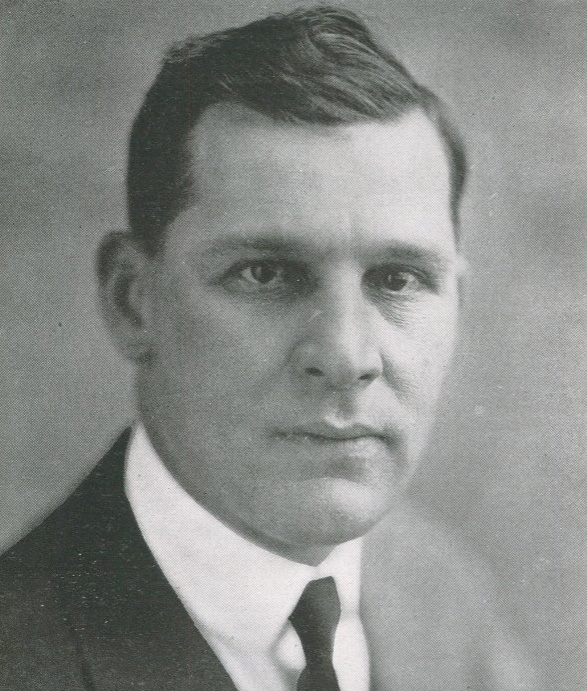
- Maulbetsch pictured in The Redskin 1923, Oklahoma A&M yearbook

Biographical details
- Born: June 20, 1890; Ann Arbor, Michigan, U.S.
- Died: September 14, 1950 (aged 60); Ann Arbor, Michigan, U.S.

Playing career

Football
- 1911: Adrian
- 1914–1916: Michigan
- Position: Halfback

Coaching career (HC unless noted)

Football
- 1917–1920: Phillips
- 1921–1928: Oklahoma A&M
- 1929–1930: Marshall

Basketball
- 1921–1929: Oklahoma A&M

Baseball
- 1922–1929: Oklahoma A&M

Head coaching record
- Overall: 61–52–11 (football); 75–75 (basketball); 61–59 (baseball)

Accomplishments and honors

Championships
- Football; 1 MVIAA (1926)

Awards
- Consensus All-American (1914); 2× First-team All-Western (1914, 1915)
- College Football Hall of Fame; Inducted in 1973 (profile)

John Frederick Maulbetsch (June 20, 1890 – September 14, 1950) was an All-American football player at Adrian College in 1911 and for the University of Michigan Wolverines from 1914 to 1916. A halfback, he is also a member of the College Football Hall of Fame.

After playing with an independent football team in Ann Arbor and at Adrian College, Maulbetsch became one of the most famous American football players in 1914 while playing for the University of Michigan. Maulbetsch was known as the "Human Bullet" because of his unusual low, line-plunging style of play, and as the "Featherweight Fullback" because of his light weight and small size. After his performance against Harvard in 1914, in which some reports indicated he gained more than 300 yards, eastern writers, including Damon Runyon, wrote articles touting Maulbetsch. Maulbetsch was also selected by Walter Camp to his All-American team.

In 1915, Maulbetsch underwent surgery for appendicitis and did not perform to the same level as he had in 1914. He made a comeback as a senior in 1916 and was again one of the leading players in college football.

Between 1917 and 1920, Maulbetsch was the head football coach at Phillips University. With Maulbetsch's name recognition, he was able to recruit big name talent to Phillips, including future Pro Football Hall of Famer Steve Owen, and future United States Olympic Committee President Doug Roby. Maulbetsch quickly turned Phillips into one of the top programs in the southwest, as his teams beat Oklahoma and Texas and lost only one game in the 1918 and 1919 seasons. Maulbetsch was later the football coach at Oklahoma A&M (later known as Oklahoma State) and Marshall College in the 1920s. He has been inducted into the College Football Hall of Fame, and the University of Michigan awards the John F. Maulbetsch Award each year to a freshman football player based on desire, character, and capacity for leadership and future success both on and off the football field.

== Ann Arbor High School and the Independents ==
Maulbetsch was born and grew up in Ann Arbor, Michigan. He attended Ann Arbor High School where he led the football team to consecutive state championships in 1908 and 1909. One account of the 1908 playoffs noted: "Ann Arbor's smashing play in the first half was wholly due to Maulbetsch, Ann Arbor's fullback, and his terrific line bucking. He clearly outshone his team mates."

After graduating from high school, Maulbetsch joined the Ann Arbor Independents, a football team made up of Michigan "varsity eligibles" and "townies." Maulbetsch was once reportedly called upon to drive across the goal line for the Independents in a game in which a large crowd, including a farmer with his plow-horse, gathered in the end zone. "Head down and legs working like piston rods, Maulbetsch plowed ahead until head struck the plow horse amidships. Down went the horse Mauly on top of him."

== College football player ==
=== Transfer from Adrian College ===
Maulbetsch started his college football career at age 21, leading Adrian College to an 8–0 record in 1911, including a 15–0 win over the University of Michigan freshman team. Maulbetsch's performance drew the attention of Michigan Coach Fielding H. Yost. After watching Maulbetsch dominate Michigan's freshman team, Yost concluded: "If I could get that kid into Michigan and keep him up in his studies I'd make an All-American place for him his first year." Yost persuaded Maulbetsch to transfer, and he played with "the scrubs" in 1912. Yost told the press at the time he had "another (Willie) Heston" in Maulbetsch.

=== 1914 season ===
Maulbetsch did not play for the varsity team until the fall of 1914 when he was 24 years old. Before the season began, Maulbetsch was "touted as one of the fastest halfbacks who ever donned moleskins. He weighs 155 pounds, is built low, has a powerful pair of shoulders and his dashes are characterized by lightning speed." Another pre-season account said he was "a wonder as a line plunger and a wizard in the open field." From the outset, considerable attention was paid to his unusual running style. Observers noted "the peculiar manner in which he runs. . . . He has a corkscrew style of dashing, and even when tackled squarely has such a sturdy pair of legs that his assailant is usually carried back several yards."

The 1914 Michigan Wolverines football team opened the season with a 58–0 win over DePauw, followed by a 69–0 victory over Case. Maulbetsch was the offensive star against Case, as he twice "carried several would-be tackles across the goal." Playing Vanderbilt the following week, Maulbetsch had runs of 25 and 35 yards, scored two touchdowns, "was worked overtime and probably advanced the pigskin more than any two other players." After starting the season 5–0, Michigan lost three of four games against top eastern schools: Syracuse, Harvard, Penn, and Cornell.

=== 1914 Harvard game ===
Maulbetsch's breakthrough came on October 31, 1914, in front of 30,000 fans at Harvard Stadium. The game was one of the most anticipated matches of the year. A special train brought Michigan fans to Cambridge, Massachusetts, and hundreds of Michigan alumni from the East were on hand as "reinforcements." Though Harvard prevailed, 7–0, Maulbetsch was the big story in papers across the country. Writers from Ring Lardner to Damon Runyon told the story of Maulbetsch's performance. Lardner said: "If anyone tells you the East plays the best brand of football, Maulbetsch shot that theory full of holes." According to Runyon, the Wolverines used "the mighty Maulbetsch as their battering ram", and he "gained enough ground against Harvard to bury a German army corps." Football writer Frank G. Menke said: "No westerner ever created half the stir in the east as did this Michigander . . . His peculiar, baffling style of attack, backed by phenomenal strength almost always earned for him gains of 5 to 20 yards every time he was called upon to carry the ball." Another writer noted Maulbetsch's skill as a "line breaker" as he "carried the ball repeatedly through the Harvard line and into the secondary defense with bullet-like rushes that upset tackler after tackler." Maulbetsch was responsible for four-fifths of Michigan's ground gains, and on several occasions his dives reportedly "had so much power that he dove right through a double line of crimson players and went sprawling on the ground twelve to twenty feet clear of the double line."

While every report indicates that Maulbetsch had a big day, the accounts vary dramatically as to exactly how many yards he gained. Frank Menke reported after the game that Maulbetsch gained 300 yards. A 1938 newspaper account said he "gained 350 yards from scrimmage." Yet, his 1951 obituary indicated he gained 133 yards in 30 attempts.

Despite Maulbetsch's efforts, Michigan was never able to punch the ball across the goal line. Many blamed Michigan's quarterback who switched to another back every time after Maulbetsch "took the ball to the shadow of the Crimson goal posts." In answer to the question why Michigan was unable to score, Frank Menke said: "Ask the fellow who quarterbacked for Michigan that day. His actions were too mystifying for the spectators to figure out."

When Harvard reneged on an agreement to play a game in Ann Arbor in 1915, sports writers concluded it was to avoid facing Maulbetsch again. Said one reporter: "When faih Hahvahd [sic] saw what Maulbetsch did in the first clash, it decided it cared to see no more of him. He was too rough."

=== "Human Bullet" ===
Much of the attention on Maulbetsch focused on his diminutive size and unique running style. At 5 ft 7 in (1.70 m), and 155 lb (70 kg), Maulbetsch was a small back, even by the standards of his day. And his running style saw him bend his torso and propel himself like a projectile into the opposing line. Indeed, he won several nicknames based on his size, running style, and fighting spirit, including the "Human Bullet," "Mauly", the "Human Shrapnel", the "Featherweight Fullback", the "Michigan Cannon Ball," and the "German bullet." Comparisons of Maulbetsch to military armaments were common. In addition to the "bullet", "shrapnel", and "cannonball" nicknames, the Syracuse Herald observed: "Standing up in front of a Krupp gun has its dangers, but it is not to be compared with the dangers of standing in front of Maulbetsch when he is going full speed ahead."

Maulbetsch's style was described as "line-plunging." A New York newspaper noted: "When the ball is snapped to him he almost doubles himself up, and, with his head aimed at the knees of the opposing line, he dives head first. Those who have seen Maulbetsch in action marvel at the great momentum he can get up in two or three steps." Noted football writer Walter Eckersall said: "Mauly is a little fellow, being built close to the ground. They say that when he plunges at the line his head is almost on a level with his shoe tops – that he hits so low that it's well nigh impossible to stop him." An Iowa newspaper wondered how it was possible "for a man to smash into a line of human bodies with the force that Maulbetsch does and come out of the game without a broken neck."

Maulbetsch was said to run "so low that he could dash under an ordinary table without losing his feet." At a coaching conference in the 1920s, a coach doubted the table-ducking story and challenged Maulbetsch. The doubter later recalled: "I began ribbing him about this table-ducking stuff and finally offered to bet him he couldn’t do it. Well, we got a table up in a room, Johnny tucked a water pitcher under his arm and backed against the wall. Darned if he didn’t do it, the only thing, that water pitcher broke in a million pieces." Asked about the incident, Maulbetsch said it was true, except one part. Maulbetsch insisted there wasn’t a nick on the pitcher.

=== Maulbetsch makes All-American ===
After the loss to Harvard in 1914, Michigan rebounded with a 34–3 win over Penn. Walter Eckersall reported that the Wolverines were "led by the redoubtable Johnny Maulbetsch." Despite being "a marked man" by the Penn defense, he was not thrown for a loss in the entire game, and he scored three touchdowns. Before Michigan lost to Cornell in the final game of the season, a scandal arose when it was revealed that the owner of an Ann Arbor pool room, Joe Reinger, had written a letter intimating that he could buy Maulbetsch and Michigan's quarterback to throw the Cornell game, and win US$50,000 from students willing to bet on Michigan. The letter was turned in to the Michigan athletic officials, and Reinger went to the athletic office "to try to hush the matter up." Reinger became abusive and was thrown out of the office by Coach Yost. The incident caused "the biggest stir of the season on the campus," as students demolished Reinger's pool room, and police had to guard Reinger's residence against threatening demonstrations that continued to "a late hour." Although Michigan did lose to Cornell, Maulbetsch was said to be "practically the only successful ground gainer for Michigan." Over the course of the 1914 season, Maulbetsch was said to have scored about half of Michigan's 252 points. A Wisconsin newspaper noted that, "when it comes time to write a resume of the 1914 football season", Maulbetsch's play "will live in the minds of men . . . for years to come." As a reward for his efforts, Maulbetsch was named a first-team All-American at the end of the 1914 season.

=== Pie and coffee diet ===
As public attention focused on Maulbetsch as "the greatest line-plunger of a decade," the press could not get enough of Maulbetsch, even interviewing his family. His sister revealed that Maulbetsch had a fondness for home cooking and received permission from the team trainer to eat at his family's Ann Arbor home. "Now, Johnny's sister explains that each day his mother baked two pies for the athlete's supper, and that in addition he had everything else his appetite craved, including coffee." Confronted by reporters about the revelation, Maulbetsch replied: "The story was slightly exaggerated. I rarely ate more than one and one half pies for dinner." Joking references to Maulbetsch's diet continued when it was reported in 1915 that he was suffering from "acute indigestion." One reporter quipped, "Those much advertised pies of his maw's evidently aren’t as great training dope as they were cracked up to be." It turned out that the indigestion was appendicitis, and Maulbetsch was hospitalized at St. Joseph's Sanitarium in Ann Arbor in April 1915, where he underwent an operation.

=== 1915 season ===
As the 1915 season was set to get underway, Coach Yost reported, "Johnny told me he was feeling fine when I saw him recently, although he doesn’t weigh as much as he used to." Despite Yost's hopes, Maulbetsch fell far short of the prior year's performance in 1915. He was several pounds lighter after the illness and surgery, and it was noted that "a few pounds means much to a man of Maulbetsch's weight." In the opening game against Lawrence, Maulbetsch scored three touchdowns, but he was "woefully weak on interference." Playing against Mount Union, Maulbetsch made several big gains, including a 50-yard touchdown run in the third quarter. His difficulties returned in the season's third game against Marietta, as "Maulbetsch was powerless to stop the Marietta forward pass, all of the successful ones being directed toward his side of the line."

After The Michigan Daily criticized his performance following the Marietta game, Maulbetsch "threatened to desert the Michigan squad and give up football for good." It reportedly took Yost several hours to coax Maulbetsch to report for practice again, and in the next game against Case, Maulbetsch did not play until the third quarter. In the season's first big game, Michigan was soundly beaten by Michigan Agricultural College, 24–0, and most of Maulbetsch's runs "didn’t even get as far as his own line." In the final four games of the season, matters got worse for Michigan and Maulbetsch, as the team went 0–3–1, scoring only 14 points in four games.

In Maulbetsch's defense, some writers noted the weakness of the Michigan line, often allowing rushers into the backfield before Maulbetsch even had the ball. But some of those same observers noted that "Mauly" was not carrying the ball "at his usual pace." Sports writer Frank Menke described Maulbetsch's 1915 performance this way: "[The] Wolverine halfback skidded from the heights of greatness to the level of mediocre. . . . The lines that he had crumpled like eggshells a year before stood up under his charges, often dumping him back for losses. The once 'unstoppable' Maulbetsch not only was stopped but forced to retract." Despite the subpar performance in 1915, Michigan's varsity letter-winners elected him captain of the team for 1916.

=== 1916 comeback ===
Maulbetsch made a strong comeback in 1916. Instead of spending the summer recovering from appendicitis, he spent the summer working as an assistant barkeeper on a steamship plying between Chicago and St. Joseph, Michigan. Maulbetsch spent his afternoons swimming and running sprints up and down the beach. On one trip, a giant coal passer claimed to be the strongest man in the world, and Maulbetsch agreed to a wrestling match on the boat. "The coal passer rushed the stripling, who ducked, caught his opponent about the waist and crushed him to the deck. When the giant woke, he wanted to know if the boat hit a rock." As the season started, The New York Times wrote: "Michigan's come-back football team, headed by Bullet Maulbetsch, is going to be an eleven to be reckoned with on the gridiron this Fall." Maulbetsch returned to his prior form, and one of the writers who had criticized him in 1915 said "the great Michigander using the same method of attack, has repeatedly broken in fragments this year the lines that he couldn’t dent in 1915."

== Professional football ==
After the 1916 football season ended, Maulbetsch considered his options. There was a report that he had been engaged as a high school football coach (and math instructor) in Toledo, Ohio. Even more prevalent were reports that he had signed to play for a professional football team. Professional football was still in its infancy in 1917, and landing a well-known star would have been a boost to any of the budding franchises. In January 1917 newspapers reported that Maulbetsch had signed a contract to play professional football for Detroit Tigers owner, Frank Navin. Navin was supporting efforts to organize a professional football league in all the important Midwestern cities, including a Detroit franchise to play at Navin Field. As late as November 1917, newspapers reported Maulbetsch had played professional football after graduating and was offered "a handsome fee" to play with the Akron Burkhardts in November 1917. Although professional football records prior to 1920 are scarce, it appears unlikely that Maulbetsch played professional football, as press accounts show he was working as a college football coach starting in 1917.

== Head football coach ==
=== Building Phillips University into a football power (1917–1920) ===
In June 1917, Maulbetsch announced that he had accepted a position as the football coach (and professor of chemistry) at Phillips University in Enid, Oklahoma. Phillips was a small, private school without a well-known athletic program. In the fall, Enid residents were "leaving their work every afternoon to watch [Maulbetsch] and his husky young Oklahoma youths work out on campus." Within a year, Maulbetsch turned Phillips into one of the strongest teams in the southwest.

Maulbetsch landed his first big recruit before leaving Ann Arbor. While playing at Michigan, Maulbetsch became friends with Doug Roby, a football player at the Michigan Military Academy, and one of the state's top recruits. Roby followed Maulbetsch to Phillips and later went on to become a member of the International Olympic Committee in the 1950s and 1960s and president of the United States Olympic Committee from 1965 to 1968. Maulbetsch's next find was future Pro Football Hall of Famer Steve Owen, who later spent 23 years with the New York Giants. Maulbetsch saw Owen watching football practice from under a tree and told him: "A fellow your size ought to be out for the squad." Owen showed up the next day and, when Maulbetsch used him to illustrate blocking fundamentals, Owen threw a block into Maulbetsch that threw him five yards through the air. Maulbetsch was satisfied, and Owen had a spot on the team. Because Phillips was not part of a conference, it was not subject to any eligibility limitations, an advantage Maulbetsch was accused of exploiting. A third key player recruited by Maulbetsch was a Native American halfback named Levi, and dubbed "Big Chief" by Phillips fans.

Having recruited top talent to Enid, Maulbetsch's teams lost only one game in 1918 and 1919, including a 10–0–1 record in 1919. In 1917 and 1918, Phillips came into the limelight when they beat the Oklahoma Sooners and the Henry Kendricks College team that had swept the west without allowing another team to score. Maulbetsch arranged a game against the Texas Longhorns in 1919, the first meeting between the schools. When the game was announced The San Antonio Light reported: "Phillips University has one of the strongest teams in the Southwest. The only team to beat them in the past two years is Oklahoma and last year Phillips beat the Sooners 13–7." The report credited Maulbetsch for securing success at an institution little known in athletics before he arrived. The University of Texas had not lost a game since 1917 when the Phillips "Haymakers" arrived in Austin, Texas on October 11, 1919. Maulbetsch's team shocked the Longhorns, holding them scoreless and winning the contest, 10–0. One Texas newspaper reported that Phillips had "whitewashed the Longhorns in their own corral."

Others in Texas concluded that Phillips' success was the result of lax or non-existent eligibility policies. The lack of eligibility rules almost certainly did play a part in Phillips’ success. When Phillips joined the Southwest Conference in 1920, it became bound by the conference's eligibility rules, and the team was outscored 97–0 in conference play against Texas A&M (47–0), Texas (27–0), Arkansas (20–0), and Texas Christian (3–0). The Galveston Daily News noted that Maulbetsch's 1920 team could not "compare with the strong team" he surprised Texas with in 1919. At the end of the 1920 season, Phillips withdrew from the Southwest Conference, and Maulbetsch accepted a new position at Oklahoma A&M.

=== Head coach at Oklahoma A&M (1921–1928) ===
In January 1921, Maulbetsch was hired as the head coach at Oklahoma Agricultural and Mechanical College (now Oklahoma State University) in Stillwater, Oklahoma. He served as the coach at Oklahoma A&M from 1921 to 1928, where his teams posted a 28–37–6 (.437) record. In 1924, his team went 6–1–2 and shut out Oklahoma (6–0), Arkansas (20–0) and Kansas (3–0). Maulbetsch's Aggies also shut out Phillips that year, 13–0. After the season, attempts were made to lure him to Washington University in St. Louis, Missouri, but Maulbetsch said he was satisfied with his position in Stillwater.

Maulbetsch arranged a game in Ann Arbor against his alma mater to start the 1926 season. Michigan beat the Aggies, 42–3. Despite an overall record of 3–4–1, Oklahoma A&M won its first conference football championship by going 3–0–1 in games against Missouri Valley Intercollegiate Athletic Association opponents. Maulbetsch also drew attention in 1926 for his disciplinary methods. When the team lost two games due to fumbles, he ordered eight of his backfield players to carry footballs with them to classes throughout the week and instructed other team members to try knocking the balls from under their arms. The penalty for losing a ball was "a hard run around the stadium." He also ordered one of his ends to wear boxing gloves after he poked an opposing player in the eye.

The Aggies won only one game against seven defeats in 1928. In late November, the day after a 46–0 loss to Oklahoma, newspapers reported that "reliable sources" had said Maulbetsch intended to resign. Maulbetsch immediately denied the rumor, saying: "I have not resigned. I am aware that a faction here is trying to get me out, but I do not intend to throw up the sponge."

In December, pressure to fire Maulbetsch grew, and one Oklahoma newspaper observed: "Coach Maulbetsch of the A. & M. football team is the object of attacks from many sides because of the rather poor showing made by his team during the past season. They are looking for a goat and just now Johnnie is cast in that role. Regardless of his past record, those who demand victory at any price and by any means whatsoever, are insisting that he be fired forthwith and a man be placed in the position who, by fair means or foul, will gather in a team that will win victories and never lose a game." Ultimately, Maulbetsch resigned at the end of May 1929 as Oklahoma A&M's coach in football, baseball, and basketball. It was announced that he would spend the remaining year of his contract on a leave of absence at half pay.

=== Head coach at Marshall College (1929–1930) ===
In July 1929, Maulbetsch was hired by Marshall College in Huntington, West Virginia to become head coach in charge of football and track. When Marshall's "Thundering Herd" got off to a 4–1 start, Maulbetsch won praise in the West Virginia press, but Marshall finished the season 1–2–1 in the second half. And in 1930, the Marshall team went 3–5–1, including a 65–0 loss to Penn State. Maulbetsch resigned as Marshall's coach in January 1931; his only comment at the time was that he had "other plans."

== Later years and legacy ==
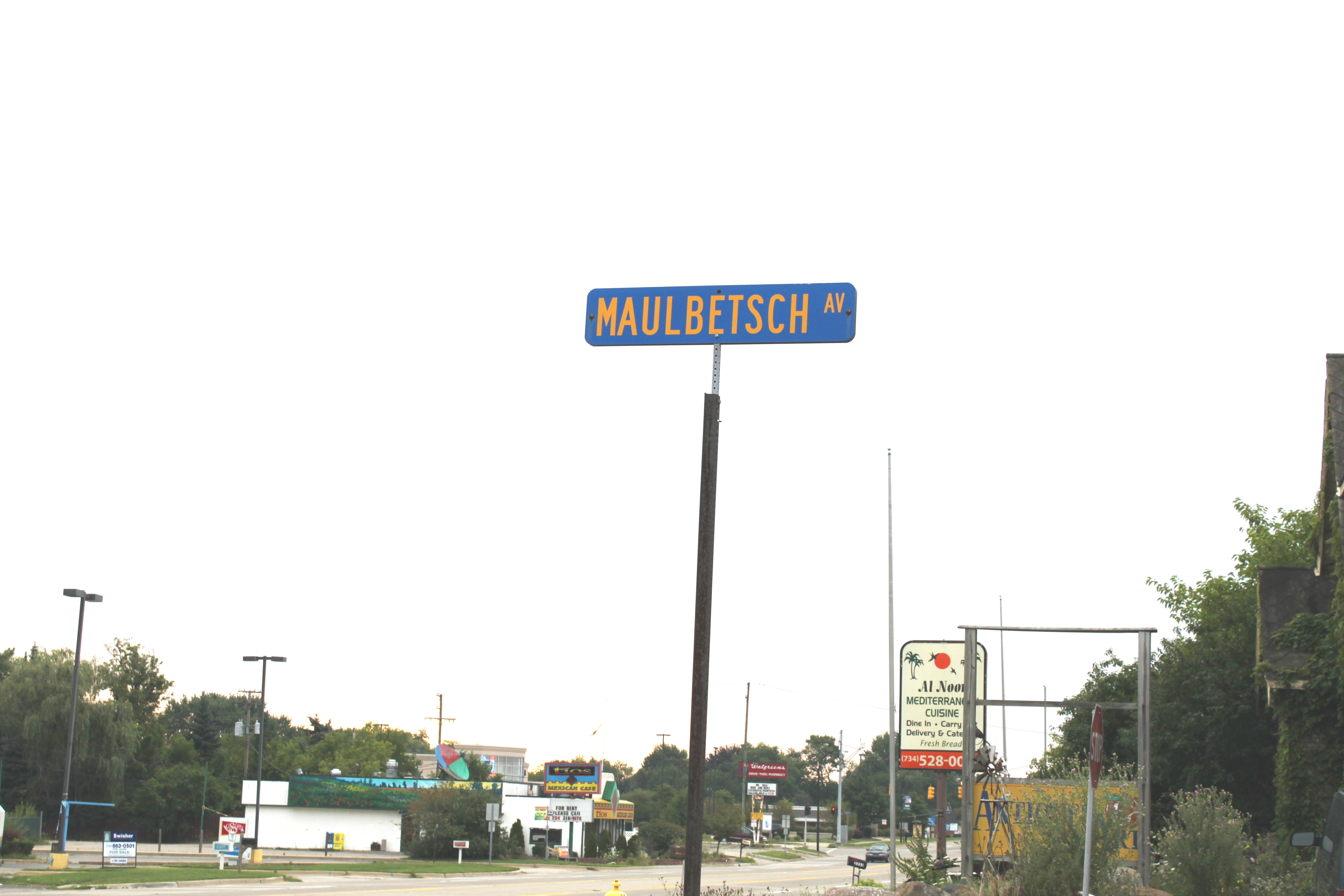
Maulbetsch Ave. street sign

After retiring from football, Maulbetsch bought a drug store in Huntington, West Virginia. During World War II, Maulbetsch took a job building B-24 Liberator bombers at Ford Motor Company's famed Willow Run Plant near Ypsilanti, Michigan. From 1946 until his death, he owned an automobile sales company in Adrian, Michigan. Maulbetsch died of cancer in 1950 at his home in Ann Arbor. He was survived by his widow, Ida, a son John Maulbetsch, and a daughter Barbara. Maulbetsch had been married to Ida (maiden name Ida Elizabeth Cappon) since May 27, 1917.

Maulbetsch was inducted posthumously into the College Football Hall of Fame in 1973. Since 1956, the John F. Maulbetsch Award has been given at the University of Michigan after spring practice to a freshman football candidate on the basis of desire, character, capacity for leadership and future success both on and off the football field. The award was established by Frederick C. Matthaei – a former classmate of Maulbetsch who went on to become a Regent of the University. The award has been a good indicator of future success, as past recipients include Jim Mandich (1967), Rick Leach (1976), Charles Woodson (1996), Marlin Jackson (2002), and Jake Long (2004). Maulbetsch Avenue in Ypsilanti Township is presumably named after Maulbetsch.

== Head coaching record ==
=== Football ===
Year	Team	Overall	Conference	Standing	Bowl/playoffs
Phillips Haymakers (Independent) (1917–1919)
1917	Phillips	8–1			
1918	Phillips	4–2			
1919	Phillips	10–0–1			
Phillips Haymakers (Southwest Conference) (1920)
1920	Phillips	4–4–2	0–3	T–7th	
Phillips:		26–7–3	0–3		
Oklahoma A&M Aggies/Cowboys (Southwest Conference) (1921–1924)
1921	Oklahoma A&M	5–4–1	1–1	T–4th	
1922	Oklahoma A&M	4–4–1	2–3	5th	
1923	Oklahoma A&M	2–8	1–3	6th	
1924	Oklahoma A&M	6–1–2	1–1–1	T–3rd	
Oklahoma A&M Cowboys (Missouri Valley Intercollegiate Athletic Association) (1925–1927)
1925	Oklahoma A&M	2–5–1	0–3–1	10th	
1926	Oklahoma A&M	3–4–1	3–0–1	1st	
1927	Oklahoma A&M	4–4	2–1	3rd	
Oklahoma A&M Cowboys (Missouri Valley Conference) (1928)
1928	Oklahoma A&M	1–7	0–1	T–4th	
Oklahoma A&M:		27–37–6	10–13–3		
Marshall Thundering Herd (West Virginia Intercollegiate Athletic Conference) (1929–1930)
1929	Marshall	5–3–1	4–1	T–4th	
1930	Marshall	3–5–1	3–0–1	T–2nd	
Marshall:		8–8–2	7–1–1		
Total:		61–52–11			
National championship Conference title Conference division title or championship game berth

=== Basketball ===
Record table
Season	Team	Overall	Conference	Standing	Postseason
Oklahoma A&M Aggies (Southwest Conference) (1921–1925)
1921–22	Oklahoma A&M	5–16	1–4	5th	
1922–23	Oklahoma A&M	12–11	7–8	T–3rd	
1922–23	Oklahoma A&M	14–6	9–5	3rd	
1924–25	Oklahoma A&M	15–3	12–2	1st	
Oklahoma A&M Aggies (Missouri Valley Intercollegiate Athletic Association) (1925–1928)
1925–26	Oklahoma A&M	9–9	5–6	8th	
1926–27	Oklahoma A&M	8–9	6–6	T–5th	
1927–28	Oklahoma A&M	11–8	11–7	3rd	
Oklahoma A&M Aggies (Missouri Valley Conference) (1928–1929)
1928–29	Oklahoma A&M	1–14	0–4	4th	
Oklahoma A&M:		75–75 (.500)	51–42 (.548)		
Total:		75–75 (.500)			
National champion Postseason invitational champion Conference regular season champion Conference regular season and conference tournament champion Division regular season champion Division regular season and conference tournament champion Conference tournament champion

=== Baseball ===
Record table
Season	Team	Overall	Conference	Standing	Postseason
Oklahoma A&M Aggies/Cowboys () (1922–1929)
1922	Oklahoma A&M	8–7			
1923	Oklahoma A&M	8–6			
1924	Oklahoma A&M	10–8			
1925	Oklahoma A&M	6–8			
1926	Oklahoma A&M	6–9			
1927	Oklahoma A&M	6–10			
1928	Oklahoma A&M	12–4			
1929	Oklahoma A&M	5–7			
Oklahoma A&M:		61–59			
Total:		61–59			
National champion Postseason invitational champion Conference regular season champion Conference regular season and conference tournament champion Division regular season champion Division regular season and conference tournament champion Conference tournament champion

== See also ==
- List of Michigan Wolverines football All-Americans
