= Armstrong Field =

Baseball park in Dallas, Texas, US

Coordinates: 32.839733°N 96.782317°W

Armstrong Field was a baseball park located in Dallas, Texas, on the campus of Southern Methodist University located where Washburne Soccer and Track Stadium now stands. It first hosted SMU football from 1915 through 1925 (Ownby Stadium opened in 1926). It was the home of the SMU baseball team (1919–1980) for many years though at least the final four seasons were played off campus. The Mustangs, Southwest Conference participants, were a team of futility during their time at Armstrong Field, scarcely in competition to win the conference. Armstrong Field did have the advantage of being located next to an outdoor school swimming pool. Legend has it that collegians would sit in the two rows at the top of the stands to see the women at the pool instead of watching the ballgame. Some were hit with foul balls due to their concentration on the women at the pool. The pool helped augment attendance by 40%. Armstrong Field was closed after the 1976 season, but before the last game the players stole home plate and concealed it in the storage area of Ownby Stadium. The plate was signed by the players and ended up in the SMU sports information division. The final four years (1977–1980) of SMU Mustangs baseball were played at Reverchon Park before the baseball program was phased out.

== Sources ==
- "Southwest Conference's Greatest Hits," Neal Farmer, c.1996
