= Philip Arbuckle =

American sports coach and college athletics administrator

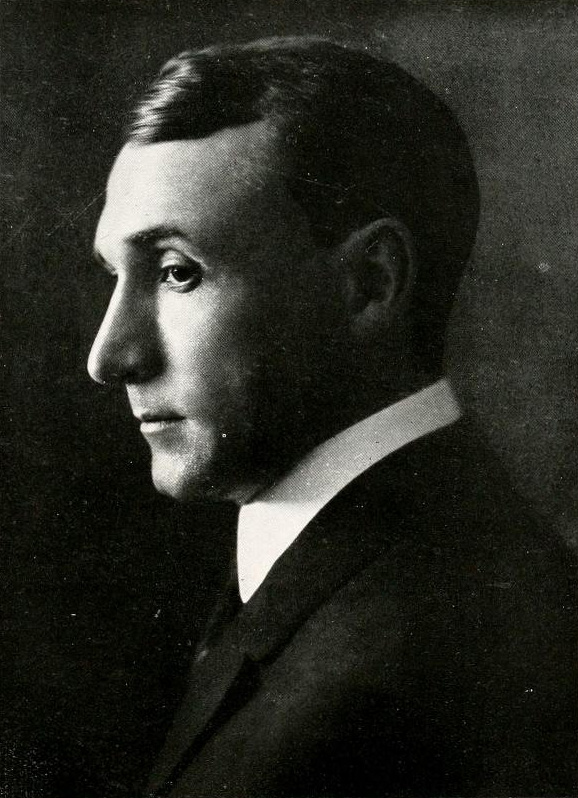

Biographical details
- Born: September 6, 1882; Kingston, Illinois, U.S.
- Died: June 11, 1932 (aged 49); Houston, Texas, U.S.

Coaching career (HC unless noted)

Football
- 1906: Shurtleff
- 1908–1911: Southwestern (TX)
- 1912–1917: Rice
- 1919–1923: Rice
- 1924: Louisiana Tech

Basketball
- 1910–1912: Southwestern (TX)
- 1922–1923: Rice

Baseball
- 1908–1911: Southwestern (TX)
- 1913–1917: Rice

Administrative career (AD unless noted)
- 1908–1912: Southwestern (TX)
- 1912–1924: Rice

Head coaching record
- Overall: 62–48–16 (football); 13–10 (basketball); 71–75–8 (baseball)

Accomplishments and honors

Championships
- Football; TIAA (1921)

Philip Heckman Arbuckle (September 6, 1882 – June 11, 1932) was an American football, basketball, and baseball coach and college athletics administrator. He served as the head football coach at Shurtleff College in Alton, Illinois in 1906, Southwestern University in Georgetown, Texas from 1908 to 1911, Rice University from 1912 to 1917 and 1919 to 1923, and Louisiana Tech University in 1924. At Rice he tallied a 51–25–8 record. His 1919 Rice team went 8–1, to mark his best season. His only losing season at Rice came in 1923. In 1924, he coached at Louisiana Tech, where he compiled a 1–6–1 record.

== Coaching career ==
In 1906, Arbuckle began his coaching career at Western Military Academy in Alton, Illinois and also coached the football team at Shurtleff College, located in the same city.

=== Rice ===
Arbuckle served as Rice University's first athletic director and football coach in 1912. His teams played against local high schools until Rice joined the Southwest Conference in 1914. Arbuckle also served as the head coach of the baseball, basketball and track teams and taught English and history. He was succeeded by John Heisman in 1924 and inducted into the Rice Athletic Hall of Fame in 1975.

== Death ==
Arbuckle died in Houston, Texas on June 11, 1932, of cardiovascular disease.

== Head coaching record ==
=== Football ===
Year	Team	Overall	Conference	Standing	Bowl/playoffs
Shurtleff (Independent) (1906)
1906	Shurtleff	2–4–2			
Shurtleff:		2–4–2			
Southwestern Pirates (Independent) (1908–1911)
1908	Southwestern	3–2			
1909	Southwestern	1–4–2			
1910	Southwestern	2–4–1			
1911	Southwestern	2–3–2			
Southwestern:		8–13–5			
Rice Grays (Independent) (1912)
1912	Rice	3–2			
Rice Grays/Owls (Texas Intercollegiate Athletic Association) (1913–1914)
1913	Rice	4–0			
1914	Rice	3–2–3			
Rice Owls (Southwest Conference / Texas Intercollegiate Athletic Association) (1915–1917)
1915	Rice	5–3	1–2	6th	
1916	Rice	6–1–2	2–1	T–3rd	
1917	Rice	7–1	1–1	T–3rd	
Rice Owls (Southwest Conference / Texas Intercollegiate Athletic Association) (1919–1923)
1919	Rice	8–1	3–1	2nd	
1920	Rice	4–2–2	2–2–1	4th	
1921	Rice	4–4–1	1–2–1 / 3–0	6th / 1st	
1922	Rice	4–4	1–4 / 1–0	7th	
1923	Rice	3–5	1–4 / 2–1	7th / T–3rd	
Rice:		51–25–8			
Louisiana Tech Bulldogs (Louisiana Intercollegiate Athletic Association) (1924)
1924	Louisiana Tech	1–6–1	0–1		
Louisiana Tech:		1–6–1	0–1		
Total:		62–48–16			
National championship Conference title Conference division title or championship game berth

=== Basketball ===
Record table
Season	Team	Overall	Conference	Standing	Postseason
Rice Owls (Southwest Conference) (1922–1923)
1922–23	Rice	10–9			
Rice:		10–9			
Total:		10–9			

=== Baseball ===
Record table
Season	Team	Overall	Conference	Standing	Postseason
Rice Owls (Independent) (1913)
1913	Rice	3–3			
Rice Owls (Southwest Conference) (1914–1917)
1914	Rice	8–8–1			
1915	Rice	5–13			
1916	Rice	2–9	2–9		
1917	Rice	8–5–1			
Rice:		26–38–2	8–24–1		
Total:		26–38–2			

== See also ==
- List of college football head coaches with non-consecutive tenure
