= 1923 Howard Bulldogs football team =

American college football season

1923 Howard Bulldogs football
- Conference: Southern Intercollegiate Athletic Association
- Record: 3–4–3 (1–3–1 SIAA)
- Head coach: Harris G. Cope (2nd season)
- Home stadium: Berry Field; Rickwood Field

1923 Southern Intercollegiate Athletic Association football standings
	Conf.					Overall
Team	W		L		T	W		L		T
Furman $	4	–	1	–	0	9	–	2	–	0
Centre	2	–	0	–	0	7	–	1	–	1
Vanderbilt*	2	–	0	–	0	5	–	2	–	1
Western Kentucky	2	–	0	–	0	3	–	4	–	0
Mississippi College	3	–	0	–	1	5	–	1	–	2
The Citadel	2	–	1	–	1	5	–	3	–	1
Presbyterian	2	–	1	–	1	4	–	3	–	1
Louisville	2	–	1	–	0	5	–	2	–	0
Sewanee	3	–	2	–	0	5	–	4	–	1
Oglethorpe	3	–	3	–	0	4	–	6	–	0
Chattanooga	1	–	3	–	1	3	–	4	–	2
Howard (AL)	1	–	3	–	1	3	–	4	–	3
Wofford	1	–	3	–	0	6	–	3	–	0
Mercer	2	–	2	–	0	4	–	5	–	0
Millsaps	0	–	1	–	1	0	–	1	–	1
Louisiana College	0	–	1	–	0	0	–	1	–	0
Georgetown (KY)	0	–	1	–	0	0	–	3	–	0
Transylvania	0	–	3	–	0	0	–	3	–	0
Newberry	0	–	4	–	0	2	–	8	–	0
$ – Conference champion; * – co-member of SoCon

The 1923 Howard Bulldogs football team was an American football team that represented Howard College (now known as the Samford University) as a member of the Southern Intercollegiate Athletic Association (SIAA) during the 1923 college football season. In their second year under head coach Harris G. Cope, the team compiled a 3–4–3 record.

== Schedule ==
Date	Opponent	Site	Result	Source
September 22	Marion*	Berry Field; Birmingham, AL	W 19–0	
September 29	at Sewanee	Hardee Field; Sewanee, TN	L 2–3	
October 6	at Vanderbilt	Dudley Field; Nashville, TN	L 0–27	
October 13	at Auburn*	Drake Field; Auburn, AL	L 0–30	
October 19	at Mississippi College	State Fairgrounds; Jackson, MS	L 3–7	
October 27	at Union (TN)*	Jackson Athletic Park; Jackson, TN	T 0–0	
November 3	Millsaps	Rickwood Field; Birmingham, AL	W 14–6	
November 10	vs. Jacksonville State*	Anniston, AL (rivalry)	W 27–0	
November 17	at Chattanooga	Chamberlain Field; Chattanooga, TN	T 0–0	
November 24	vs. Birmingham–Southern*	Rickwood Field; Birmingham, AL	T 6–6	
*Non-conference game
