= 1923 Mississippi College Choctaws football team =

American college football season

1923 Mississippi College Choctaws football
- Conference: Southern Intercollegiate Athletic Association
- Record: 5–1–2 (3–0–1 SIAA)
- Head coach: George Bohler (1st season)
- Home stadium: Provine Field; State Fairgrounds

1923 Southern Intercollegiate Athletic Association football standings
| | Conf. | | | | | Overall |
| Team | W | | L | | T | W | | L | | T |
|---|---|---|---|---|---|---|---|---|---|---|
| Furman $ | 4 | – | 1 | – | 0 | 9 | – | 2 | – | 0 |
| Centre | 2 | – | 0 | – | 0 | 7 | – | 1 | – | 1 |
| Vanderbilt* | 2 | – | 0 | – | 0 | 5 | – | 2 | – | 1 |
| Western Kentucky | 2 | – | 0 | – | 0 | 3 | – | 4 | – | 0 |
| Mississippi College | 3 | – | 0 | – | 1 | 5 | – | 1 | – | 2 |
| The Citadel | 2 | – | 1 | – | 1 | 5 | – | 3 | – | 1 |
| Presbyterian | 2 | – | 1 | – | 1 | 4 | – | 3 | – | 1 |
| Louisville | 2 | – | 1 | – | 0 | 5 | – | 2 | – | 0 |
| Sewanee | 3 | – | 2 | – | 0 | 5 | – | 4 | – | 1 |
| Oglethorpe | 3 | – | 3 | – | 0 | 4 | – | 6 | – | 0 |
| Chattanooga | 1 | – | 3 | – | 1 | 3 | – | 4 | – | 2 |
| Howard (AL) | 1 | – | 3 | – | 1 | 3 | – | 4 | – | 3 |
| Wofford | 1 | – | 3 | – | 0 | 6 | – | 3 | – | 0 |
| Mercer | 2 | – | 2 | – | 0 | 4 | – | 5 | – | 0 |
| Millsaps | 0 | – | 1 | – | 1 | 0 | – | 1 | – | 1 |
| Louisiana College | 0 | – | 1 | – | 0 | 0 | – | 1 | – | 0 |
| Georgetown (KY) | 0 | – | 1 | – | 0 | 0 | – | 3 | – | 0 |
| Transylvania | 0 | – | 3 | – | 0 | 0 | – | 3 | – | 0 |
| Newberry | 0 | – | 4 | – | 0 | 2 | – | 8 | – | 0 |
$ – Conference champion; * – co-member of SoCon

The 1923 Mississippi College Choctaws football team was an American football team that represented Mississippi College as a member of the Southern Intercollegiate Athletic Association (SIAA) in the 1923 college football season. Led by George Bohler in his first season as head coach, the team compiled an overall record of 5–1–2, with a mark of 3–0–1 against SIAA competition. Bohler was hired in June 1923 as head coach after Stanley L. Robinson left the Choctaws to become head coach at Mercer.

== Schedule ==
| Date | Opponent | Site | Result | Source |
|---|---|---|---|---|
| October 6 | at Tulane* | Tulane Stadium; New Orleans, LA | L 3–18 | |
| October 13 | at Birmingham–Southern* | Rickwood Field; Birmingham, AL | W 19–0 | |
| October 19 | Howard (AL) | State Fairgrounds; Jackson, MS | W 7–3 | |
| October 27 | Louisiana College | Provine Field; Clinton, MS | W 3–0 | |
| November 2 | vs. LSU* | Vicksburg Fairgrounds; Vicksburg, MS | T 0–0 | |
| November 10 | vs. Ole Miss* | Mississippi-Alabama Fair Grounds; Meridian, MS | W 6–0 | |
| November 17 | Mercer | Provine Field; Clinton, MS | W 15–0 | |
| November 29 | vs. Millsaps | State Fairgrounds; Jackson, MS (Rivalry) | T 0–0 | |
*Non-conference game
