= 1923 Clemson Tigers football team =

American college football season

1923 Clemson Tigers football
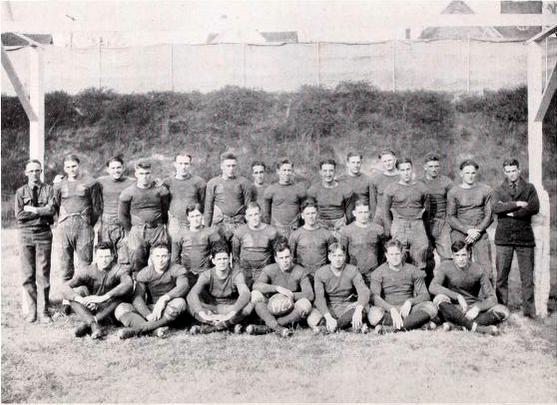
- Conference: Southern Conference
- Record: 5–2–1 (1–1–1 SoCon)
- Head coach: Bud Saunders (1st season)
- Captain: Butch Holohan
- Home stadium: Riggs Field

1923 Southern Conference football standings
| | Conf. | | | | | Overall |
| Team | W | | L | | T | W | | L | | T |
|---|---|---|---|---|---|---|---|---|---|---|
| Washington & Lee + | 4 | – | 0 | – | 1 | 6 | – | 3 | – | 1 |
| Vanderbilt * + | 3 | – | 0 | – | 1 | 5 | – | 2 | – | 1 |
| VPI | 4 | – | 1 | – | 0 | 6 | – | 3 | – | 0 |
| Alabama | 4 | – | 1 | – | 1 | 7 | – | 2 | – | 1 |
| Maryland | 2 | – | 1 | – | 0 | 7 | – | 2 | – | 1 |
| Florida | 1 | – | 0 | – | 2 | 6 | – | 1 | – | 2 |
| North Carolina | 2 | – | 1 | – | 1 | 5 | – | 3 | – | 1 |
| Georgia | 3 | – | 2 | – | 0 | 5 | – | 3 | – | 1 |
| Mississippi A&M | 2 | – | 1 | – | 2 | 5 | – | 2 | – | 2 |
| Tennessee | 4 | – | 3 | – | 0 | 5 | – | 4 | – | 1 |
| Tulane | 2 | – | 2 | – | 1 | 6 | – | 3 | – | 1 |
| Clemson | 1 | – | 1 | – | 1 | 5 | – | 2 | – | 1 |
| Georgia Tech | 0 | – | 0 | – | 4 | 3 | – | 2 | – | 4 |
| NC State | 1 | – | 4 | – | 0 | 3 | – | 7 | – | 0 |
| Auburn | 0 | – | 1 | – | 3 | 3 | – | 3 | – | 3 |
| Kentucky | 0 | – | 2 | – | 2 | 4 | – | 3 | – | 2 |
| Virginia | 0 | – | 3 | – | 1 | 3 | – | 5 | – | 1 |
| LSU | 0 | – | 3 | – | 0 | 3 | – | 5 | – | 1 |
| Ole Miss | 0 | – | 4 | – | 0 | 4 | – | 6 | – | 0 |
| South Carolina | 0 | – | 4 | – | 0 | 4 | – | 6 | – | 0 |
+ – Conference co-champions; * co-member of SIAA

The 1923 Clemson Tigers football team represented Clemson College—now known as Clemson University—as a member of the Southern Conference (SoCon) during the 1923 college football season. Led by first-year head coach Bud Saunders, the Tigers compiled an overall record of 5–2–1 with a mark of 1–1–1 in conference play, tying for 11th place in the SoCon.

== Schedule ==
| Date | Time | Opponent | Site | Result | Source |
|---|---|---|---|---|---|
| September 29 | | Auburn | Riggs Field; Calhoun, SC (rivalry) | T 0–0 | |
| October 6 | | Newberry* | Riggs Field; Calhoun, SC | W 32–0 | |
| October 12 | 3:30 p.m. | at Centre* | Cheek Field; Danville, KY | L 7–28 | |
| October 25 | | at South Carolina | State Fairgrounds; Columbia, SC (rivalry) | W 7–6 | |
| November 3 | | at VPI | Miles Field; Blacksburg, VA | L 6–25 | |
| November 9 | | Davidson* | Riggs Field; Calhoun, SC | W 12–0 | |
| November 17 | | Presbyterian* | Riggs Field; Calhoun, SC | W 20–0 | |
| November 29 | | at Furman* | Manly Field; Greenville, SC | W 7–6 | |
*Non-conference game; All times are in Eastern time
