= 1923 Florida Gators football team =

American college football season

1923 Florida Gators football
- Conference: Southern Conference
- Record: 6–1–2 (1–0–2 SoCon)
- Head coach: James Van Fleet (1st season)
- Offensive scheme: Notre Dame Box
- Captain: W. M. Robinson
- Home stadium: Fleming Field

Uniform
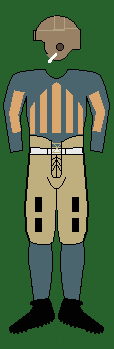

1923 Southern Conference football standings
	Conf.					Overall
Team	W		L		T	W		L		T
Washington & Lee +	4	–	0	–	1	6	–	3	–	1
Vanderbilt * +	3	–	0	–	1	5	–	2	–	1
VPI	4	–	1	–	0	6	–	3	–	0
Alabama	4	–	1	–	1	7	–	2	–	1
Maryland	2	–	1	–	0	7	–	2	–	1
Florida	1	–	0	–	2	6	–	1	–	2
North Carolina	2	–	1	–	1	5	–	3	–	1
Georgia	3	–	2	–	0	5	–	3	–	1
Mississippi A&M	2	–	1	–	2	5	–	2	–	2
Tennessee	4	–	3	–	0	5	–	4	–	1
Tulane	2	–	2	–	1	6	–	3	–	1
Clemson	1	–	1	–	1	5	–	2	–	1
Georgia Tech	0	–	0	–	4	3	–	2	–	4
NC State	1	–	4	–	0	3	–	7	–	0
Auburn	0	–	1	–	3	3	–	3	–	3
Kentucky	0	–	2	–	2	4	–	3	–	2
Virginia	0	–	3	–	1	3	–	5	–	1
LSU	0	–	3	–	0	3	–	5	–	1
Ole Miss	0	–	4	–	0	4	–	6	–	0
South Carolina	0	–	4	–	0	4	–	6	–	0
+ – Conference co-champions; * co-member of SIAA

The 1923 Florida Gators football team represented the University of Florida during the 1923 Southern Conference football season. This was Major James Van Fleet's first of two seasons as the head coach of the Florida Gators football team. Van Fleet was a serving officer in the U.S. Army and a professor of military tactics in the university's Reserve Officer Training Corps (ROTC) program, and had been a standout fullback on the undefeated West Point Cadets team of 1914. Van Fleet's 1923 Florida Gators finished 6–1–2 overall, and 1–0–2 in the Southern Conference, placing third of twenty-one teams in the conference standings.

Notably, Florida alumni and students celebrated their first-ever homecoming with a 19–7 victory over the Mercer Baptists. The Gators tied the defending SoCon champion Georgia Tech Golden Tornado, and the highlight of the 1923 season was a 16–6 upset of coach Wallace Wade's previously undefeated Alabama Crimson Tide on a muddy, rain-soaked field in Birmingham, Alabama in the final game of the year.

== Before the season ==
The 1923 team was built on sophomores. The 1922 Florida freshmen won the southern crown for freshmen squads. The team included Cy Williams, Goldy Goldstein, Edgar Jones, and Bill Middlekauff.

One preseason account reads: "Big Cy Williams, star Freshman tackle of last year and probably the Varsity tackle of this year, was the immediate cause of the 'dummy's' downfall for when he dove into the lifeless foe, it collapsed and Cy was deluged with sawdust. A new 'dummy' was brought out but it is predicted that it will not last long under the fierce tackling of the Gators gridders."

== Schedule ==
Date	Opponent	Site	Result	Attendance	Source
October 6	at Army*	The Plain; West Point, NY	L 0–20		
October 13	at Georgia Tech	Grant Field; Atlanta, GA	T 7–7	12,000	
October 19	Rollins*	Fleming Field; Gainesville, FL	W 28–0		
October 27	vs. Wake Forest	Plant Field; Tampa, FL	W 16–7	7,000	
November 3	Mercer*^{†}	Fleming Field; Gainesville, FL	W 19–7	5,000	
November 10	at Stetson*	DeLand, FL	W 27–0		
November 17	vs. Southern College*	Adair Field; Lakeland, FL	W 53–0		
November 24	vs. Mississippi A&M	Barrs Field; Jacksonville, FL	T 13–13		
November 29	at Alabama	Rickwood Field; Birmingham, AL (rivalry)	W 16–6	10,000	
*Non-conference game; ^{†}Homecoming

== Game summaries ==
=== Week 1: at Army ===
Week 1: Florida at Army

Team	1	2	3	4	Total
Florida	0	0	0	0	0
• Army	0	0	14	6	20

- Date: October 6
- Location: West Point, NY

In the season's first game, the Gators to the surprise of many held coach John McEwan's Army team scoreless in the first half, but managed to lose the game 20–0 in the second.

Edgar Garbisch missed two first-half field goals. In the third quarter Army's passing game began to work, leading to a touchdown by William H. Wood. A blocked punt led to another Wood score. In the fourth quarter, Tiny Hewitt broke through the line for a 35-yard run, leading to the final score by quarterback George Smythe.

The starting lineup was: Lightsey (left end), Williams (left tackle), Goldstein (left guard), Cornwall (center), Norton (right guard), Robinson (right tackle), Merrin (right end), Newton (quarterback), Middlekauff (left halfback), Case (right halfback), Jones (fullback).

=== Week 2: at Georgia Tech ===
Week 2: Florida at Georgia Tech

Team	1	2	3	4	Total
Florida	7	0	0	0	7
Ga. Tech	0	0	0	7	7

- Date: October 13
- Location: Grant Field
  Atlanta, GA
- Game attendance: 12,000

The Gators contest with coach Bill Alexander's Georgia Tech Golden Tornado brought interest after the prior week's game with Army. In front of 12,000 at Grant Field, the Gators were up 7–0 until a rush of substitutes in the fourth quarter got Tech the tying score. The tie "knocked the Golden Tornado...off of its pedestal as the top team in Southern football." The tie excited fans and "provided more positive national for Florida football than it had ever received."

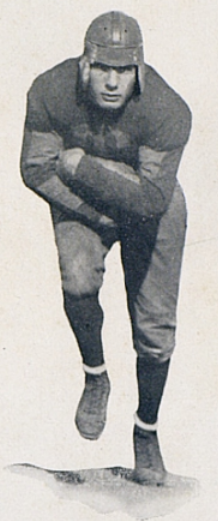
Bill Middlekauff

Florida scored after a 25-yard Ark Newton interception return. A Newton pass to Edgar C. Jones then got the ball to Tech's 3-yard line. From there, Bill Middlekauff hit the line for a touchdown.

The starting lineup was: Lightsey (left end), Williams (left tackle), Norton (left guard), Cornwall (center), Goldstein (right guard), Robinson (right tackle), Merwin (right end), Jones (quarterback), Brown (left halfback), Newton (right halfback), Middlekauff (fullback).

=== Week 3: Rollins ===
Week 3: Rollins at Florida

Team	1	2	3	4	Total
Rollins	0	0	0	0	0
• Florida	21	0	7	0	28

- Date: October 19
- Referee: Ted Arnold

Florida scored three touchdowns in the first quarter against the Rollins Tars and eased up afterwards, winning 28–0. The big score was as expected. The Stetson Collegiate said the Gators "rank as the best in the South."

Rollins did not manage a first down the entire first half.

The starting lineup was: Merrin (left end), Williams (left tackle), Smith (left guard), Cornwall (center), Goldstein (right guard), Robinson (right tackle), Lightsey (right end), Jones (quarterback), Brown (left halfback), Pomeroy (right halfback), Middlekauff (fullback).

=== Week 4: Wake Forest ===
Week 4: Wake Forest at Florida

Team	1	2	3	4	Total
Wake	0	0	7	0	7
• Florida	9	7	0	0	16

- Date: October 27
- Location: Plant Field
  Tampa, FL
- Game attendance: 7,000
- Referee: Ted Arnold

On Plant Field in Tampa, the Gators defeated the Wake Forest Demon Deacons 16–7. Wake Forest was held scoreless in the first half while Florida scored two touchdowns with one extra point and a field goal.

The Demon Deacons scored in the third quarter on a series of runs and forward passes. They again threatened the goal in the fourth quarter, but were stopped at the 2-yard line on downs.

The starting lineup was: Lightsey (left end), Williams (left tackle), Smith (left guard), Cornwall (center), Goldstein (right guard), Robinson (right tackle), Merrin (right end), Jones (quarterback), Newton (left halfback), Pomeroy (right halfback), Middlekauff (fullback).

=== Week 5: Mercer ===
Week 5: Mercer at Florida

Team	1	2	3	4	Total
Mercer	7	0	0	0	7
• Florida	0	7	6	6	19

- Date: November 4
- Location: Fleming Field
  Gainesville, FL
- Game attendance: 5,000

In front of the largest crowd yet to see a game in Gainesville (5,000), Florida defeated coach Stanley L. Robinson's Mercer Baptists at its first ever homecoming 19–7. Florida had 18 first downs to Mercer's 2.

Mercer's touchdown came in the first quarter on the recovery of an Ark Newton punt blocked by Mercer's Crook Smith. Mercer's Kid Cecil also had many spectacular runs. A 28-yard pass from Edgar C. Jones to Spec Lightsey got the Gators' first touchdown. Another touchdown came on a Bill Middlekauff run as the third quarter closed, after a drive utilizing both the run and the pass. The final score came on a run around end by Dick Brown.

Middlekauff said after the game, "Mercer's line is the strongest one I have seen this year–and I have plunged the Army's and Tech's."

=== Week 6: Stetson ===
Week 6: Stetson at Florida

Team	1	2	3	4	Total
Stetson	0	0	0	0	0
• Florida	7	0	13	7	27

- Date: November 10
- Location: Fleming Field
  Gainesville, FL

In the sixth week of play, the Gators defeated the Stetson Hatters 27–0.

Florida opened the game expecting to need only substitutes. This was quickly recognized as foolish; and a mix of substitutes and starters scored the first touchdown. Stetson's offense then got going, with a run of 28 yards and 55 yards resulting in a touchdown if not for a holding penalty. Then the Gators sent in the varsity. Still, Stetson outperformed Florida in the second quarter. The lack of reserves wore on Stetson, and Florida opened up the contest in the second half.

=== Week 7: Southern College ===
In the seventh week of play, Florida rolled up the largest score of the season on Southern College in Lakeland, 53–0.

=== Week 8: Mississippi A&M ===
Week 8: Mississippi A&M at Florida

Team	1	2	3	4	Total
Miss A&M	7	6	0	0	13
Florida	7	0	6	0	13

- Date: November 24
- Location: Barrs Field
  Jacksonville, FL

The Gators and coach Earl Abell's Mississippi A&M Aggies fought to a 13–13 tie. The Aggies also tied conference champion Vanderbilt.

In the first minutes of play, Luckett scored for Mississippi A&M. The Gators answered with a touchdown on a pass from Jones to Ark Newton. In the second quarter, from his own 1-yard line, Newton had a 96-yard punt, topping his previous record of 92. It went 65 yards in the air.

The Gators failed to capitalize on the long punt, and fumbled at the 7-yard line on its next possession. After an exchange of punts, Luckett ran for 53 yards on a double pass play, setting up another Aggie touchdown.

After another exchange of punts, two passes set up the tying score: Newton to Lightsey and Jones to Newton. Bill Middlekauff then made the tying score from the 5-yard line with four line plunges. Newton missed the extra point.

The starting lineup was: Lightsey (left end), Williams (left tackle), Norton (left guard), Cornwall (center), Goldstein (right guard), Robinson (right tackle), Merwin (right end), Jones (quarterback), Newton (left halfback), Pomeroy (right halfback), Middlekauff (fullback).

=== Week 9: at Alabama ===
Week 9: Florida at Alabama

Team	1	2	3	4	Total
• Florida	0	0	9	7	16
Alabama	0	6	0	0	6

- Date: November 29
- Location: Rickwood Field
  Birmingham, AL
- Game attendance: 10,000
- Game weather: Rain

On a muddy field with pools of water, the Gators upset the previously undefeated Alabama Crimson Tide with a comeback, 16–6 victory on Thanksgiving Day, putting the Florida program in the national spotlight for the first time. It was the Tide's first year under head coach Wallace Wade. The upset gave his previous school of Vanderbilt the SoCon title. In an attempt to drum up publicity, Champ Pickens photographed a stuffed alligator and drew tiny Crimsons swarming around it.

Florida back Edgar C. Jones scored all of his team's points. The Gator scores by Jones came on runs of 10 yards around right end, a 12-yard place kick, and a 20-yard run around right end. The punting of Ark Newton and the line play of captain Robbie Robinson (in his final game) and Goldy Goldstein also helped the Gators get the victory.

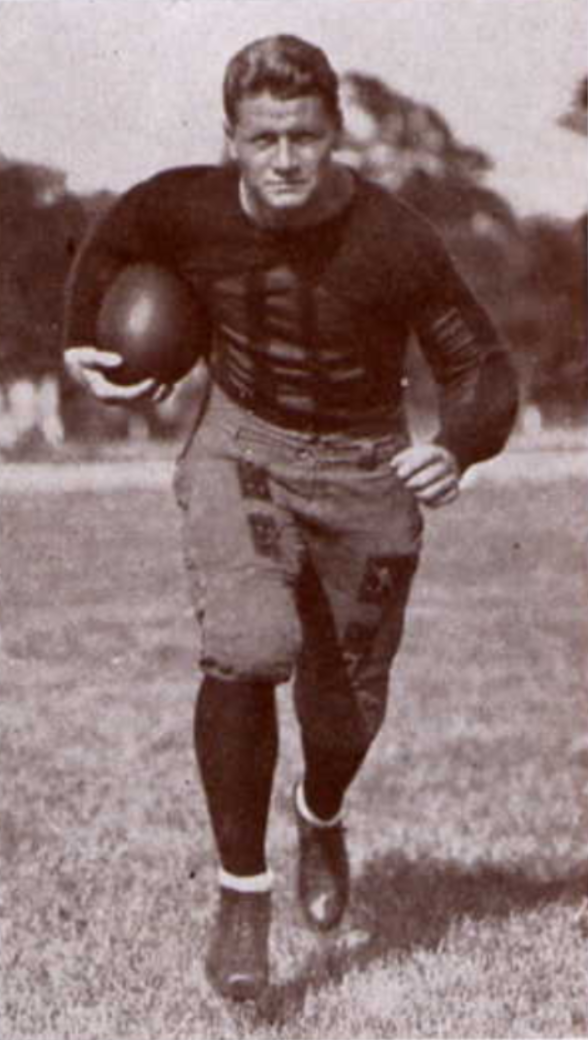
Edgar C. Jones.

In the first half, Alabama's Grant Gillis won the punting battle and Florida was on the defensive, turning back multiple scoring threats from inside the 10-yard line. Pooley Hubert scored first. The Gators eschewed their stockings in the second half, due to the rain and mud, and waited until the last minute to come out for the kickoff, while Alabama was already lined up. Because of this maneuver, Wade never spoke to coach Van Fleet again.

A few minutes into the second half, Newton complete a 12-yard pass to Dick Brown, down at Alabama's 20-yard line. Brown went around left end for 9 yards; then Jones went around right end for 10 yards and the tying touchdown. Newton missed the extra point. Moments later Newton kicked a punt of 60 yards, from his own 20-yard line to the same of Alabama's. Gillis botched the ensuing Alabama punt. Bill Middlekauff ran behind left guard twice, and Newton ran behind right tackle once, netting 8 yards in three plays. From the 12-yard line, Jones converted a placekick. Newton continued to punt well, and attempted a 53-yard field goal which barely missed. He also tried a 60-yard field goal which was blocked, recovered by Florida's Joe Merrin on Alabama's 20-yard line. Runs at the line failed, and Jones went around right end for 20 yards and the final touchdown.

After the game, Van Fleet said "Tom Sebring helped in that game with an idea. Ark needed a little more time (to punt) than most. Sebring proposed we worry only about the kick and not the runback, leaving an extra blocker for Ark. It worked."

The starting lineup was: Lightsey (left end), Williams (left tackle), Norton (left guard), Cornwall (center), Goldstein (right guard), Robinson (right tackle), Merrin (right end), Jones (quarterback), Newton (left halfback), Brown (right halfback), Middlekauff (fullback).

== Postseason ==
Robbie Robinson, Goldy Goldstein and Ark Newton became the first Gators to make the composite All-Southern team. Edgar C. Jones and Bill Middlekauff made Billy Evans's "Southern Honor Roll". Robinson and Goldstein made Evans' National Honor Roll.

== Personnel ==
=== Depth chart ===
The following chart provides a visual depiction of Florida's lineup during the 1923 season with games started at the position reflected in parentheses. The chart mimics a Notre Dame Box on offense.

LE
Spec Lightsey (5)
Joe Merrin (1)

LT	LG	C	RG	RT
Cy Williams (6)	Clyde Norton (3)	Sam Cornwall (6)	Goldy Goldstein (5)	Robbie Robinson (6)
	Horse Smith (2)		Clyde Norton (1)	
	Goldy Goldstein (1)			

RE
Joe Merrin (5)
Spec Lightsey (1)

QB
Edgar C. Jones (5)
Ark Newton (1)

RHB
Stewart Pomeroy (3)
Lawrence Case (1)
Dick Brown (1)
Ark Newton (1)

LHB
Ark Newton (3)
Dick Brown (2)
Bill Middlekauff (1)

FB
Bill Middlekauff (5)
Edgar C. Jones (1)

=== Line ===
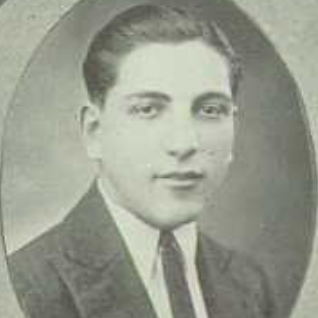
Goldy Goldstein.

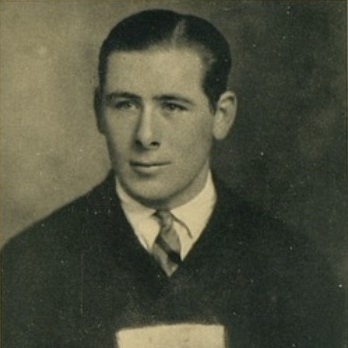
Captain Robinson.

==== Starters ====
Player	Position	Games started	Hometown	Prep school	Height	Weight	Age
Sam Cornwall	center						
Goldy Goldstein	guard		Jacksonville, Florida	Duval High	6'3"	210	19
Spec Lightsey	end						
Joe Merrin	end						
Clyde Norton	guard						
Robbie Robinson	tackle		Mobile, Alabama		6'0"	180	21
Horace Smith	guard						
Cy Williams	tackle		Sopchoppy, Florida		6'0"	200	

==== Subs ====
Player	Position	Hometown	Prep school	Height	Weight	Age
Alexander	guard					
Boyd	end					
Ralph Champlin	guard					
Fowler	guard					
Hamilton	end					
Cadillac Harry	guard					
Hartridge	end					
Morris	tackle					
Mervin Mounts	end					
Nielsen	end					
Nolte	center					
Ezra Raasch	guard					
J. R. Rose	end					
Edgar Todd	end					
Towles	end					
Wyatt	end					

=== Backfield ===
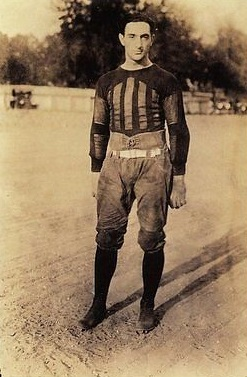
Ark Newton.

==== Starters ====
Player	Position	Games started	Hometown	Prep school	Height	Weight	Age
Richard Brown	halfback						
Edgar C. Jones	quarterback		Jacksonville, Florida				19
Bill Middlekauff	fullback		Miami, Florida		6'2"	200	19
Ark Newton	halfback		Camden, Arkansas	Camden High	6'1"	185	20
Stewart Pomeroy	halfback						

==== Subs ====
Player	Position	Hometown	Prep school	Height	Weight	Age
Osmond Bie	halfback					
Robert Brumby	quarterback					
Lawrence Case	halfback					
Flood	halfback					
J. Johnson	halfback					
Jack Matthews	fullback					
John Murphree	quarterback					
Owen Pittman	halfback					
Randall	quarterback					
Sibert	halfback					
George Stanley	quarterback					
Yetter	halfback					

=== Coaching staff ===
- Head coach: James Van Fleet
- Assistants: Tom Sebring, Everett Yon, George Weber, Rex Farrior (freshmen)
- Manager: Frank Evans

== See also ==
- 1923 College Football All-Southern Team

== Bibliography ==
- Carlson, Norm (2007). University of Florida Football Vault: The History of the Florida Gators. Atlanta, Georgia: Whitman Publishing, LLC. ISBN 978-0-7948-2298-9.
- University of Florida (1924). The Seminole. Vol. 15.
- Woodruff, Fuzzy (1928). A History of Southern Football 1890–1928. Vol. 2.
