= 1923 Virginia Cavaliers football team =

American college football season

1923 Virginia Cavaliers football
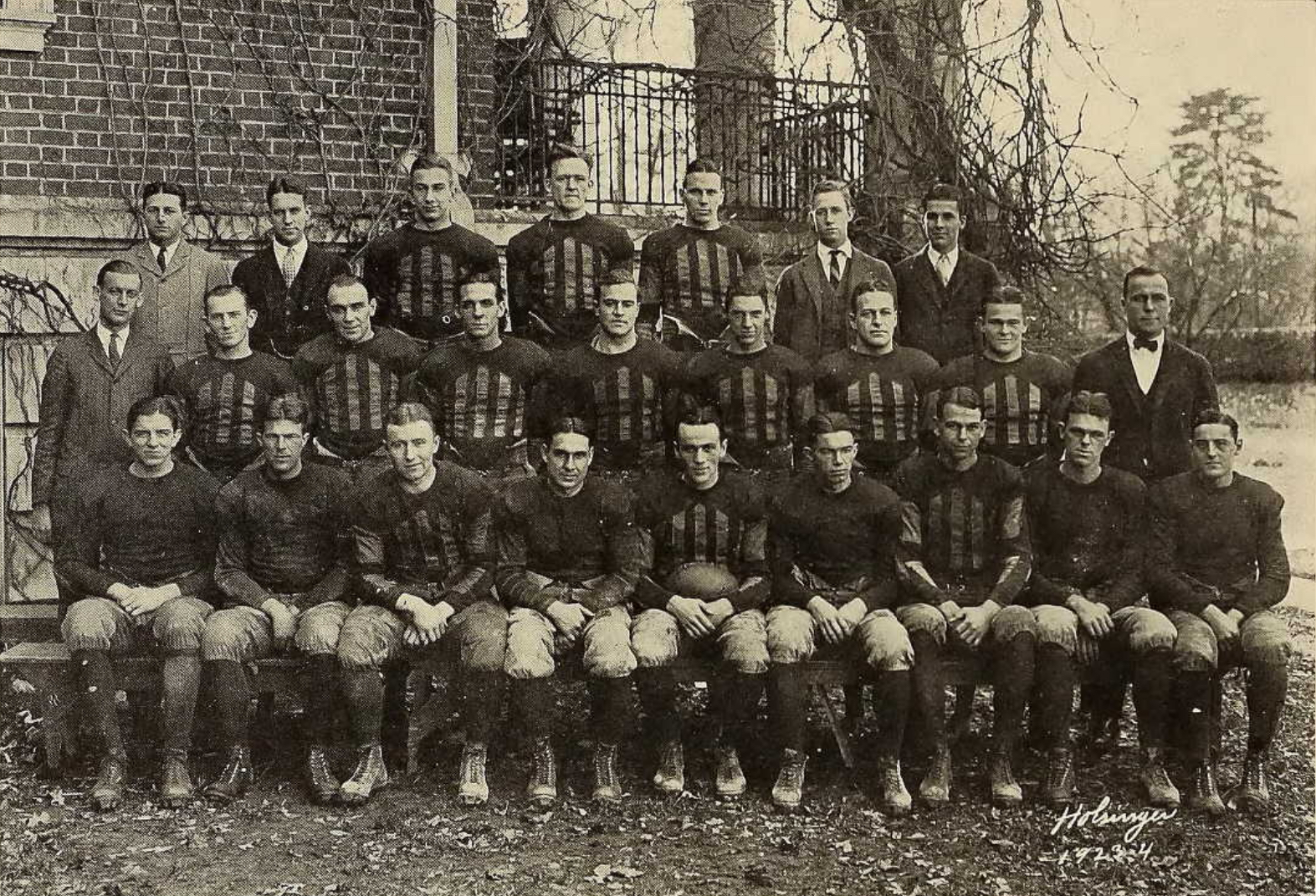
- Conference: Southern Conference
- Record: 3–5–1 (0–3–1 SoCon)
- Head coach: Greasy Neale (1st season)
- Home stadium: Lambeth Field

1923 Southern Conference football standings
	Conf.					Overall
Team	W		L		T	W		L		T
Washington & Lee +	4	–	0	–	1	6	–	3	–	1
Vanderbilt * +	3	–	0	–	1	5	–	2	–	1
VPI	4	–	1	–	0	6	–	3	–	0
Alabama	4	–	1	–	1	7	–	2	–	1
Maryland	2	–	1	–	0	7	–	2	–	1
Florida	1	–	0	–	2	6	–	1	–	2
North Carolina	2	–	1	–	1	5	–	3	–	1
Georgia	3	–	2	–	0	5	–	3	–	1
Mississippi A&M	2	–	1	–	2	5	–	2	–	2
Tennessee	4	–	3	–	0	5	–	4	–	1
Tulane	2	–	2	–	1	6	–	3	–	1
Clemson	1	–	1	–	1	5	–	2	–	1
Georgia Tech	0	–	0	–	4	3	–	2	–	4
NC State	1	–	4	–	0	3	–	7	–	0
Auburn	0	–	1	–	3	3	–	3	–	3
Kentucky	0	–	2	–	2	4	–	3	–	2
Virginia	0	–	3	–	1	3	–	5	–	1
LSU	0	–	3	–	0	3	–	5	–	1
Ole Miss	0	–	4	–	0	4	–	6	–	0
South Carolina	0	–	4	–	0	4	–	6	–	0
+ – Conference co-champions; * co-member of SIAA

The 1923 Virginia Cavaliers football team represented the University of Virginia as a member of the Southern Conference (SoCon) during the 1923 college football season. Led by first-year head coach Greasy Neale, the Cavaliers compiled an overall record of 3–5–1 with a mark of 0–3–1 in conference play, placing 17th in the SoCon.

== Schedule ==
Date	Time	Opponent	Site	Result	Attendance	Source
September 29		Furman*	Lambeth Field; Charlottesville, VA	L 10–13		
October 6		Richmond*	Lambeth Field; Charlottesville, VA	W 9–0		
October 13		St. John's (MD)*	Lambeth Field; Charlottesville, VA	W 32–7		
October 20		VMI*	Lambeth Field; Charlottesville, VA	L 0–35	9,000	
October 27		Trinity (NC)*	Lambeth Field; Charlottesville, VA	W 33–0		
November 3		at Washington and Lee	Wilson Field; Lexington, VA	L 0–7	7,500	
November 10		Georgia	Lambeth Field; Charlottesville, VA	L 0–13		
November 17	2:30 p.m.	VPI^{†}	Lambeth Field; Charlottesville, VA (rivalry)	L 3–6	6,000	
November 29		North Carolina	Emerson Field; Chapel Hill, NC (rivalry)	T 0–0	14,231	
*Non-conference game; ^{†}Homecoming
