= Bill McAllester =

American baseball player (1888–1970)

- Catcher
- Born: December 29, 1888; Chattanooga, Tennessee, U.S.
- Died: March 3, 1970 (aged 81); Chattanooga, Tennessee, U.S.
- Batted: Right Threw: Right

MLB debut
- May 2, 1913, for the St. Louis Browns

Last MLB appearance
- October 5, 1913, for the St. Louis Browns

MLB statistics
- Batting average: .153
- Home runs: 0
- Runs batted in: 6
- Stats at Baseball Reference

Teams
- St. Louis Browns (1913)

William Lusk McAllester (December 29, 1888 – March 3, 1970) was an American catcher in Major League Baseball. He played for the St. Louis Browns in 1913.

== Head coaching record ==
Year	Team	Overall	Conference	Standing	Bowl/playoffs
Chattanooga Moccasins (Southern Intercollegiate Athletic Association) (1922–1924)
1922	Chattanooga	6–2–1	3–1	7th	
1923	Chattanooga	3–4–2	1–3–1	T–11th	
1924	Chattanooga	1–7–1	0–5	20th	
Chattanooga:		9–13–4	4–9–1		
Total:		9–13–4			
