= 1923 VPI Gobblers football team =

American college football season

1923 VPI Gobblers football
- Conference: Southern Conference
- Record: 6–3 (4–1 SoCon)
- Head coach: B. C. Cubbage (3rd season)
- Captain: Harry McMullen Sutton
- Home stadium: Miles Field

1923 Southern Conference football standings
	Conf.					Overall
Team	W		L		T	W		L		T
Washington & Lee +	4	–	0	–	1	6	–	3	–	1
Vanderbilt * +	3	–	0	–	1	5	–	2	–	1
VPI	4	–	1	–	0	6	–	3	–	0
Alabama	4	–	1	–	1	7	–	2	–	1
Maryland	2	–	1	–	0	7	–	2	–	1
Florida	1	–	0	–	2	6	–	1	–	2
North Carolina	2	–	1	–	1	5	–	3	–	1
Georgia	3	–	2	–	0	5	–	3	–	1
Mississippi A&M	2	–	1	–	2	5	–	2	–	2
Tennessee	4	–	3	–	0	5	–	4	–	1
Tulane	2	–	2	–	1	6	–	3	–	1
Clemson	1	–	1	–	1	5	–	2	–	1
Georgia Tech	0	–	0	–	4	3	–	2	–	4
NC State	1	–	4	–	0	3	–	7	–	0
Auburn	0	–	1	–	3	3	–	3	–	3
Kentucky	0	–	2	–	2	4	–	3	–	2
Virginia	0	–	3	–	1	3	–	5	–	1
LSU	0	–	3	–	0	3	–	5	–	1
Ole Miss	0	–	4	–	0	4	–	6	–	0
South Carolina	0	–	4	–	0	4	–	6	–	0
+ – Conference co-champions; * co-member of SIAA

The 1923 VPI Gobblers football team represented Virginia Polytechnic Institute in the 1923 college football season. The team was led by their head coach B. C. Cubbage and finished with a record of six wins and three losses (6–3).

In November 1923, VPI's fieldhouse, which held all of their football equipment, was destroyed by a fire. Coach Cubbage had to go to Philadelphia to get replacement equipment.

== Schedule ==
Date	Time	Opponent	Site	Result	Attendance	Source
September 29		Hampden–Sydney*	Miles Field; Blacksburg, VA	W 29–0		
October 6		Davidson*	Miles Field; Blacksburg, VA	W 7–0		
October 13		at 3rd Army Corps*	Baltimore Stadium; Baltimore, MD	L 17–21		
October 20		vs. Maryland	Griffith Stadium; Washington, DC	W 16–7	5,000	
October 27		at Washington and Lee	Fair Grounds; Lynchburg, VA	L 0–12	5,000–7,000	
November 3		Clemson	Miles Field; Blacksburg, VA	W 25–6		
November 10	2:45 p.m.	vs. NC State	League Park; Norfolk, VA	W 16–0		
November 17	2:30 p.m.	at Virginia	Lambeth Field; Charlottesville, VA (rivalry)	W 6–3	6,000	
November 29	2:30 p.m.	vs. VMI*	Fair Grounds; Roanoke, VA (rivalry)	L 0–6	14,000–18,000	
*Non-conference game; All times are in Eastern time

== Before the season ==
The 1922 VPI Gobblers football team compiled a 8–1–1 record and were led by B. C. Cubbage in his second season as head coach.

== Game summaries ==
=== Hampden–Sydney ===
VPI's first game of the season was a victory over Hampden–Sydney at Miles Field.

The starting lineup for VPI was: Rhodes (left end), Baker (left tackle), Ray (left guard), Moran (center), Hammock (right guard), Graham (right tackle), Holly (right end), Sutton (quarterback), Rutherford (left halfback), Flory (right halfback), Buchanan (fullback). The substitutes were: Bailey, Beck, DeLaBarre, Ebert, Gaines, Greene, Liebrecht, Moss, Nutter, Pumphrey, Roberts, Whitt and Wood.

The starting lineup for Hampden–Sydney was: Edwin Ott (left end), William Fuqua (left tackle), Kent (left guard), Alfred Dudley (center), Cecil Blankenship (right guard), Edward Sager (right tackle), Hurt (right end), Robert Brenaman (quarterback), Bailey Tyson (left halfback), A. A. Adkins (right halfback), Claiborne Carter (fullback). The substitutes were: Gold, W. Nace, William Richardson and William Venable.

=== Davidson ===
Davidson vs. VPI

Team	1	2	3	4	Total
Davidson	0	0	0	0	0
• VPI	0	7	0	0	7

- Date: October 6, 1923
- Location: Miles Field
  Blacksburg, VA
- Referee: Ernest Sampson (St. Albans)

After their victory over Hampden–Sydney, VPI played Davidson College at Miles Field.

The starting lineup for VPI was: Greene (left end), Baker (left tackle), Rea (left guard), Moran (center), Hammock (right guard), Graham (right tackle), Holly (right end), Roberts (quarterback), Sutton (left halfback), Buchanan (right halfback), DeLaBarre (fullback). The substitutes were: Beck, Flory, Liebrecht, Moss, Nutter, Pumphrey and Rhodes.

The starting lineup for Davidson was: Charles Davis (left end), Charles Hodgin (left tackle), William Long (left guard), Mason Field (center), Ralph Boggs (right guard), Samuel Summers (right tackle), Elias Faison (right end), James Hendrix (quarterback), W. M. Black (left halfback), W. S. Shepherd (right halfback), James DeArmon (fullback). The substitutes were: Thompson Baker, John Covington, Warren Cox, John Hunt, Red Laird, Harry Lindamood, Nevin Sappenfield and Harry Vance.

=== 3rd Army Corps ===
VPI at 3rd Army Corps

Team	1	2	3	4	Total
VPI	0	0	7	10	17
• 3rd	0	7	14	0	21

- Date: October 13, 1923
- Location: Baltimore Stadium
  Baltimore, MD
- Referee: Morice (Penn)

The starting lineup for VPI was: Rhodes (left end), Greene (left tackle), Rea (left guard), Baker (center), Moran (right guard), Graham (right tackle), Holly (right end), Sutton (quarterback), Rutherford (left halfback), Moss (right halfback), Buchanan (fullback). The substitutes were: Bailey, DeLaBarre, Flory, Gaines, Hammock and Roberts.

The starting lineup for 3rd Army Corps was: H. E. Tyler (left end), O'Farrell Knight (left tackle), Moore (left guard), Francis Greene (center), John Stokes (right guard), Franz von Schilling (right tackle), White (right end), Cornman Hahn (quarterback), Dodd (left halfback), Pishon (right halfback), Vic Noyes (fullback). The substitutes were: Jared and Arthur Rogers.

=== Maryland ===
Maryland vs. VPI

Team	1	2	3	4	Total
Maryland	0	0	7	0	7
• VPI	9	0	0	7	16

- Date: October 20, 1923
- Location: Griffith Stadium
  Washington, DC
- Game attendance: 5,000
- Referee: Pat Barry (Georgetown)

The starting lineup for VPI was: Rhodes (left end), Greene (left tackle), Rea (left guard), Moran (center), Hammock (right guard), Graham (right tackle), Holly (right end), Sutton (quarterback), Rutherford (left halfback), Moss (right halfback), Buchanan (fullback). The substitutes were: Bailey, Baker, DeLaBarre, Flory, Ray and Roberts.

The starting lineup for Maryland was: Bill Supplee (left end), Walter Bromley (left tackle), Irving Hall (left guard), Cecil Branner (center), John Hough (right guard), Joseph C. Burger (right tackle), John R. Lanigan (right end), Kirkland Besley (quarterback), Ed Pugh (left halfback), George Heine (right halfback), Jack McQuade (fullback). The substitutes were: Mac Brewer, John Groves and George Pollock.

=== Washington and Lee ===
VPI at Washington & Lee

Team	1	2	3	4	Total
VPI	0	0	0	0	0
• W&L	12	0	0	0	12

- Date: October 27, 1923
- Location: Fair Grounds
  Lynchburg, VA
- Game attendance: 5,000–7,000
- Game weather: "Beautiful"
- Referee: Jack Gass

The starting lineup for VPI was: Rhodes (left end), Greene (left tackle), Rea (left guard), Baker (center), Hammock (right guard), Graham (right tackle), Holly (right end), Sutton (quarterback), Rutherford (left halfback), Moss (right halfback), Buchanan (fullback). The substitutes were: Bailey, DeLaBarre, Flory, Nutter, Ray and Roberts.

The starting lineup for Washington and Lee was: Ralph Daves (left end), Warren E. Tilson (left tackle), Douglas Bemis (left guard), Preston Hatcher (center), Merrell Budnick (right guard), Leslie Stemmons (right tackle), James Kay Thomas (right end), Everett Burke (quarterback), Robert Frew (left halfback), Mayo Hamilton (right halfback), Eddie Cameron (fullback). The substitutes were: Thomas Bemis, Harry Dawson and Henry McMillan.

=== Clemson ===
The starting lineup for VPI was: Rhodes (left end), Greene (left tackle), Rea (left guard), Moran (center), Ray (right guard), Graham (right tackle), Bailey (right end), Sutton (quarterback), Rutherford (left halfback), Flory (right halfback), Moss (fullback). The substitutes were: Ebert, Gaines, Hammock, Holly, Liebrecht, Nutter, Pumphrey, Roberts, Sanders, Saunders and Wood.

The starting lineup for Clemson was: Gary Finklea (left end), Strother (left tackle), Wilson (left guard), Wertz (center), Sam Jackson (right guard), Butch Holohan (right tackle), Garrison (right end), Dotterer (quarterback), Charlie Robinson (left halfback), Pat Harmon (right halfback), Bratton Williams (fullback). The substitutes were: Charlie Tennant and Wray.

=== NC State ===
NC State vs. VPI

Team	1	2	3	4	Total
NC State	0	0	0	0	0
• VPI	0	0	10	6	16

- Date: November 10, 1923
- Location: League Park
  Norfolk, VA
- Game start: 2:45 p.m.
- Referee: Rip Major

The starting lineup for VPI was: Rhodes (left end), Greene (left tackle), Rea (left guard), Moran (center), Ray (right guard), Graham (right tackle), Holly (right end), Sutton (quarterback), Rutherford (left halfback), Flory (right halfback), Moss (fullback). The substitutes were: Bailey, Beck, DeLaBarre, Gaines, Hammock, Nutter, Roberts, Saunders and Williams.

The starting lineup for NC State was: Elms (left end), William Cox (left tackle), Henry Seawell (left guard), Thomas Bostian (center), Percy Beatty (right guard), G. Randolph Logan (right tackle), Samuel Wallis (right end), Sprague (quarterback), Shuford (left halfback), Alfred Johnston (right halfback), Gaither Lassiter (fullback). The substitutes were: Beasley, Johnson, Joseph Ripple and William White.

=== Virginia ===
VPI at Virginia

Team	1	2	3	4	Total
• VPI	0	0	0	6	6
UVA	3	0	0	0	3

- Date: November 17, 1923
- Location: Lambeth Field
  Charlottesville, VA
- Game start: 2:30 p.m.
- Game attendance: 6,000
- Referee: Paul Magoffin

The starting lineup for VPI was: Rhodes (left end), Greene (left tackle), Rea (left guard), Moran (center), Ray (right guard), Graham (right tackle), Holly (right end), Sutton (quarterback), Flory (left halfback), Rutherford (right halfback), Moss (fullback). The substitutes were: Bailey, Baker, Buchanan, Hammock, and Nutter.

The starting lineup for Virginia was: William Deitrick (left end), Mul Holland (left tackle), Thomas Hall (left guard), Fred Thesmar (center), George Baldwin (right guard), James Winston (right tackle), Donald Darby (right end), George Arnold (quarterback), Garland Hubbard (left halfback), Samuel Maphis (right halfback), Paul Walp (fullback). The substitutes were: Walter Brown, Henry Foster, Loth, Thomas McCoy, Taylor, Coleman Walker and Maitland Wilson.

=== VMI ===
VMI vs. VPI

Team	1	2	3	4	Total
• VMI	0	0	6	0	6
VPI	0	0	0	0	0

- Date: November 29, 1923
- Location: Fair Grounds
  Roanoke, VA
- Game start: 2:30 p.m.
- Game attendance: 14,000–18,000
- Game weather: "Steady downpour"
- Referee: Ed Thorpe (De LaSalle)

The starting lineup for VPI was: Rhodes (left end), Liebrecht (left tackle), Moran (left guard), Baker (center), Hammock (right guard), Graham (right tackle), Nutter (right end), Sutton (quarterback), Flory (left halfback), Rutherford (right halfback), Moss (fullback). The substitutes were: Buchanan, Greene, Rea and Roberts.

The starting lineup for VMI was: Mortimer Watkins (left end), Charlie Barbour (left tackle), Thomas McCracken (left guard), Francis Ferguson (center), Carl Hammond (right guard), Frank Clements (right tackle), Eugene Carlton (right end), Worthington Faulkner (quarterback), Paul Caldwell (left halfback), Edward Ryder (right halfback), Khleber Attwell (fullback). The substitutes were: Windy White.

== Players ==
=== Roster ===
VPI 1923 roster
Adams; Samuel Bailey; Robert Baker; C. O. Beck; Brown; Raymond Buchanan; Bullock; Byrd; Harry White Culbreth; Cecil Franzen DeLaBarre; P. R. Ebert; Charles Flory; Edwin Ruthven Gaines; Glaze; Samuel Graham; Arthur Greene; Lawrence Hammock	Hart; Forrest Holly; Johnson; Edward Frank Liebrecht; Joseph Moran; Jack Moss; Oscar Nutter; James Ray; Robert Rea; Charles Rhodes; Arthur Roberts; Rumphrey; Donald Rutherford; Stennette; Harry McMullen Sutton (Capt.); Williams; Wood

=== Monogram Club members ===
Seventeen players received monograms for their participation on the 1923 VPI team.

Player	Hometown	Notes
Robert Lindsay Baker	Norfolk, Virginia	
C. O. Beck	Erwin, Tennessee	
Raymond Madison Buchanan	Saltville, Virginia	
Samuel Russell "Pop" Bailey	Farmville, Virginia	
Charles Laurence Flory	Porterville, California	
Samuel Oscar Graham	Hamilton, Virginia	
Arthur Trevilian Greene		
Lawrence Atkins Hammock		
Forrest William Holly		
Joseph Henry Moran	Radford, Virginia	
Jack Wellford Moss	Roanoke, Virginia	United States Army Corps of Engineers. During World War II, he developed methods for crossing rice paddies in the Philippines in planning for the invasion of Japan. He was also the chief engineer in charge of plans, design and construction of Washington National Airport and Andrews Air Force Base.
Oscar Price Nutter	Blacksburg, Virginia	2nd Lieutenant, Army.
James Edward "Teddy" Ray	Fredericksburg, Virginia	
Robert James Rea		
Charles Douglas Rhodes	Bristol, Virginia	World War I veteran (Navy).
Arthur Roberts, Jr.	East Radford, Virginia	
Donald Hurt Rutherford	Bristol, Virginia	

== Coaching and training staff ==
- Head coach: B. C. Cubbage
- Assistant coach: John Graham "Rip" Wallace
- Manager: J. F. Baker
- Freshman head coach: Henry Redd
- Freshman Managers
  - William Thomas Johns, Jr.
  - Carroll
