= 1923 Tennessee Volunteers football team =

American college football season

1923 Tennessee Volunteers football
- Conference: Southern Conference
- Record: 5–4–1 (4–3 SoCon)
- Head coach: M. B. Banks (3rd season)
- Captain: Tarzan Holt
- Home stadium: Shields–Watkins Field

1923 Southern Conference football standings
	Conf.					Overall
Team	W		L		T	W		L		T
Washington & Lee +	4	–	0	–	1	6	–	3	–	1
Vanderbilt * +	3	–	0	–	1	5	–	2	–	1
VPI	4	–	1	–	0	6	–	3	–	0
Alabama	4	–	1	–	1	7	–	2	–	1
Maryland	2	–	1	–	0	7	–	2	–	1
Florida	1	–	0	–	2	6	–	1	–	2
North Carolina	2	–	1	–	1	5	–	3	–	1
Georgia	3	–	2	–	0	5	–	3	–	1
Mississippi A&M	2	–	1	–	2	5	–	2	–	2
Tennessee	4	–	3	–	0	5	–	4	–	1
Tulane	2	–	2	–	1	6	–	3	–	1
Clemson	1	–	1	–	1	5	–	2	–	1
Georgia Tech	0	–	0	–	4	3	–	2	–	4
NC State	1	–	4	–	0	3	–	7	–	0
Auburn	0	–	1	–	3	3	–	3	–	3
Kentucky	0	–	2	–	2	4	–	3	–	2
Virginia	0	–	3	–	1	3	–	5	–	1
LSU	0	–	3	–	0	3	–	5	–	1
Ole Miss	0	–	4	–	0	4	–	6	–	0
South Carolina	0	–	4	–	0	4	–	6	–	0
+ – Conference co-champions; * co-member of SIAA

The 1923 Tennessee Volunteers football team (variously "Tennessee", "UT" or the "Vols") represented the University of Tennessee in the 1923 college football season. Playing as a member of the Southern Conference (SoCon), the team was led by head coach M. B. Banks, in his third year, and played their home games at Shields–Watkins Field in Knoxville, Tennessee. The 1922 Vols won five, lost four, and tied one game (5–4–1 overall, 4–3 in the SoCon). The 1923 Vols were outscored by their opponents 167 to 82 and were shut out three times.

== Schedule ==
Date	Opponent	Site	Result	Source
September 29	at Army*	The Plain; West Point, NY	L 0–41	
October 6	Maryville (TN)*	Shields–Watkins Field; Knoxville, TN	T 14–14	
October 13	Georgetown (KY)*	Shields–Watkins Field; Knoxville, TN	W 13–6	
October 20	Georgia	Shields–Watkins Field; Knoxville, TN (rivalry)	L 0–17	
October 27	vs. Mississippi A&M	Russwood Park; Memphis, TN	W 7–3	
November 3	Tulane	Shields–Watkins Field; Knoxville, TN	W 13–2	
November 10	at Vanderbilt	Dudley Field; Nashville, TN (rivalry)	L 7–51	
November 17	VMI	Shields–Watkins Field; Knoxville, TN	L 0–33	
November 24	Ole Miss	Shields–Watkins Field; Knoxville, TN (rivalry)	W 10–0	
November 29	at Kentucky	Stoll Field; Lexington, KY (rivalry)	W 18–0	
*Non-conference game
