= 1923 NC State Wolfpack football team =

American college football season

1923 NC State Wolfpack football
- Conference: Southern Conference
- Record: 3–7 (1–4 SoCon)
- Head coach: Harry Hartsell (4th season)
- Home stadium: Riddick Stadium

1923 Southern Conference football standings
	Conf.					Overall
Team	W		L		T	W		L		T
Washington & Lee +	4	–	0	–	1	6	–	3	–	1
Vanderbilt * +	3	–	0	–	1	5	–	2	–	1
VPI	4	–	1	–	0	6	–	3	–	0
Alabama	4	–	1	–	1	7	–	2	–	1
Maryland	2	–	1	–	0	7	–	2	–	1
Florida	1	–	0	–	2	6	–	1	–	2
North Carolina	2	–	1	–	1	5	–	3	–	1
Georgia	3	–	2	–	0	5	–	3	–	1
Mississippi A&M	2	–	1	–	2	5	–	2	–	2
Tennessee	4	–	3	–	0	5	–	4	–	1
Tulane	2	–	2	–	1	6	–	3	–	1
Clemson	1	–	1	–	1	5	–	2	–	1
Georgia Tech	0	–	0	–	4	3	–	2	–	4
NC State	1	–	4	–	0	3	–	7	–	0
Auburn	0	–	1	–	3	3	–	3	–	3
Kentucky	0	–	2	–	2	4	–	3	–	2
Virginia	0	–	3	–	1	3	–	5	–	1
LSU	0	–	3	–	0	3	–	5	–	1
Ole Miss	0	–	4	–	0	4	–	6	–	0
South Carolina	0	–	4	–	0	4	–	6	–	0
+ – Conference co-champions; * co-member of SIAA

The 1923 NC State Wolfpack football team was an American football team that represented the North Carolina State College of Agriculture and Engineering (now known as North Carolina State University) as a member of the Southern Conference (SoCon) during the 1923 college football season. In their fourth season under head coach Harry Hartsell, NC State compiled a 3–7 record.

== Schedule ==
Date	Time	Opponent	Site	Result	Attendance	Source
September 29		Roanoke*	Riddick Stadium; Raleigh, NC	W 6–0		
October 6		at Penn State*	New Beaver Field; University Park, PA	L 0–16	3,000	
October 13		South Carolina	Riddick Stadium; Raleigh, NC	W 7–0		
October 18		North Carolina	Riddick Stadium; Raleigh, NC (rivalry)	L 0–14	10,895	
October 27		at VMI*	VMI Parade Ground; Lexington, VA	L 7–22		
November 3		vs. Davidson*	Wearn Field; Charlotte, NC	W 12–6		
November 10	2:45 p.m.	vs. VPI	League Park; Norfolk, VA	L 0–16		
November 17		Maryland	Riddick Stadium; Raleigh, NC	L 12–26		
November 24		at Wake Forest*	Gore Field; Wake Forest, NC (rivalry)	L 0–14	4,000	
November 29		vs. Washington and Lee	League Park; Norfolk, VA	L 12–20		
*Non-conference game
