= 1923 Auburn Tigers football team =

American college football season

1923 Auburn Tigers football
- Conference: Southern Conference
- Record: 3–3–3 (0–1–3 SoCon)
- Head coach: Boozer Pitts (1st season)
- Captain: Rip Reagan
- Home stadium: Drake Field; Rickwood Field; Cramton Bowl

1923 Southern Conference football standings
	Conf.					Overall
Team	W		L		T	W		L		T
Washington & Lee +	4	–	0	–	1	6	–	3	–	1
Vanderbilt * +	3	–	0	–	1	5	–	2	–	1
VPI	4	–	1	–	0	6	–	3	–	0
Alabama	4	–	1	–	1	7	–	2	–	1
Maryland	2	–	1	–	0	7	–	2	–	1
Florida	1	–	0	–	2	6	–	1	–	2
North Carolina	2	–	1	–	1	5	–	3	–	1
Georgia	3	–	2	–	0	5	–	3	–	1
Mississippi A&M	2	–	1	–	2	5	–	2	–	2
Tennessee	4	–	3	–	0	5	–	4	–	1
Tulane	2	–	2	–	1	6	–	3	–	1
Clemson	1	–	1	–	1	5	–	2	–	1
Georgia Tech	0	–	0	–	4	3	–	2	–	4
NC State	1	–	4	–	0	3	–	7	–	0
Auburn	0	–	1	–	3	3	–	3	–	3
Kentucky	0	–	2	–	2	4	–	3	–	2
Virginia	0	–	3	–	1	3	–	5	–	1
LSU	0	–	3	–	0	3	–	5	–	1
Ole Miss	0	–	4	–	0	4	–	6	–	0
South Carolina	0	–	4	–	0	4	–	6	–	0
+ – Conference co-champions; * co-member of SIAA

The 1923 Auburn Tigers football team represented Auburn University in the 1923 college football season. It was the Tigers' 32nd overall and they competed as a member of the Southern Conference (SoCon). The team was led by head coach Boozer Pitts, in his first year, and played their home games at Drake Field in Auburn, Alabama. They finished with a record of three wins, three losses and three ties (3–3–3 overall, 0–1–3 in the SoCon).

== Schedule ==
Date	Opponent	Site	Result	Source
September 29	at Clemson	Riggs Field; Clemson, SC	T 0–0	
October 6	Birmingham–Southern*	Cramton Bowl; Montgomery, AL	W 20–0	
October 13	Howard (AL)*	Drake Field; Auburn, AL	W 30–0	
October 20	at Army*	The Plain; West Point, NY	L 6–28	
October 27	Fort Benning*	Drake Field; Auburn, AL	W 34–0	
November 3	vs. Georgia	Memorial Stadium; Columbus, GA (rivalry)	L 0–7	
November 10	Tulane	Cramton Bowl; Montgomery, AL (rivalry)	T 6–6	
November 17	Centre*	Rickwood Field; Birmingham, AL	L 0–17	
November 29	at Georgia Tech	Grant Field; Atlanta, GA (rivalry)	T 0–0	
*Non-conference game
