= 1923 Tulane Green Wave football team =

American college football season

1923 Tulane Green Wave football
- Conference: Southern Conference
- Record: 6–3–1 (2–2–1 SoCon)
- Head coach: Clark Shaughnessy (8th season)
- Offensive scheme: Single-wing
- Captain: Harry Talbot
- Home stadium: Second Tulane Stadium

1923 Southern Conference football standings
	Conf.					Overall
Team	W		L		T	W		L		T
Washington & Lee +	4	–	0	–	1	6	–	3	–	1
Vanderbilt * +	3	–	0	–	1	5	–	2	–	1
VPI	4	–	1	–	0	6	–	3	–	0
Alabama	4	–	1	–	1	7	–	2	–	1
Maryland	2	–	1	–	0	7	–	2	–	1
Florida	1	–	0	–	2	6	–	1	–	2
North Carolina	2	–	1	–	1	5	–	3	–	1
Georgia	3	–	2	–	0	5	–	3	–	1
Mississippi A&M	2	–	1	–	2	5	–	2	–	2
Tennessee	4	–	3	–	0	5	–	4	–	1
Tulane	2	–	2	–	1	6	–	3	–	1
Clemson	1	–	1	–	1	5	–	2	–	1
Georgia Tech	0	–	0	–	4	3	–	2	–	4
NC State	1	–	4	–	0	3	–	7	–	0
Auburn	0	–	1	–	3	3	–	3	–	3
Kentucky	0	–	2	–	2	4	–	3	–	2
Virginia	0	–	3	–	1	3	–	5	–	1
LSU	0	–	3	–	0	3	–	5	–	1
Ole Miss	0	–	4	–	0	4	–	6	–	0
South Carolina	0	–	4	–	0	4	–	6	–	0
+ – Conference co-champions; * co-member of SIAA

The 1923 Tulane Green Wave football team was an American football team that represented Tulane University as a member of the Southern Conference (SoCon) during the 1923 college football season. In its eighth year under head coach Clark Shaughnessy, Tulane compiled a 6–3–1 record (2–2–1 in conference games), finished in 11th place on the SoCon, and outscored opponents by a total of 117 to 89.

== Schedule ==
Date	Opponent	Site	Result	Attendance	Source
September 29	Southwestern Louisiana*	Tulane Stadium; New Orleans, LA	W 20–2		
October 6	Mississippi College*	Tulane Stadium; New Orleans, LA	W 18–3		
October 13	vs. Texas*	Magnolia Ballpark; Beaumont, TX	L 0–33	8,000	
October 20	Louisiana Tech*	Tulane Stadium; New Orleans, LA	W 13–7		
October 27	at Vanderbilt	Dudley Field; Nashville, TN	L 0–17	10,000	
November 3	at Tennessee	Shields–Watkins Field; Knoxville, TN	L 2–13		
November 10	at Auburn	Cramton Bowl; Montgomery, AL (rivalry)	T 6–6		
November 17	Ole Miss	Tulane Stadium; New Orleans, LA (rivalry)	W 19–0		
November 24	LSU	Tulane Stadium; New Orleans, LA (Battle for the Rag)	W 20–0	14,000	
November 29	Washington University*	Tulane Stadium; New Orleans, LA	W 19–8	3,000	
*Non-conference game
