= 1923 LSU Tigers football team =

American college football season

1923 LSU Tigers football
- Conference: Southern Conference
- Record: 3–5–1 (0–3 SoCon)
- Head coach: Mike Donahue (1st season)
- Captain: E. L. "Tubby" Ewen
- Home stadium: State Field

1923 Southern Conference football standings
	Conf.					Overall
Team	W		L		T	W		L		T
Washington & Lee +	4	–	0	–	1	6	–	3	–	1
Vanderbilt * +	3	–	0	–	1	5	–	2	–	1
VPI	4	–	1	–	0	6	–	3	–	0
Alabama	4	–	1	–	1	7	–	2	–	1
Maryland	2	–	1	–	0	7	–	2	–	1
Florida	1	–	0	–	2	6	–	1	–	2
North Carolina	2	–	1	–	1	5	–	3	–	1
Georgia	3	–	2	–	0	5	–	3	–	1
Mississippi A&M	2	–	1	–	2	5	–	2	–	2
Tennessee	4	–	3	–	0	5	–	4	–	1
Tulane	2	–	2	–	1	6	–	3	–	1
Clemson	1	–	1	–	1	5	–	2	–	1
Georgia Tech	0	–	0	–	4	3	–	2	–	4
NC State	1	–	4	–	0	3	–	7	–	0
Auburn	0	–	1	–	3	3	–	3	–	3
Kentucky	0	–	2	–	2	4	–	3	–	2
Virginia	0	–	3	–	1	3	–	5	–	1
LSU	0	–	3	–	0	3	–	5	–	1
Ole Miss	0	–	4	–	0	4	–	6	–	0
South Carolina	0	–	4	–	0	4	–	6	–	0
+ – Conference co-champions; * co-member of SIAA

The 1923 LSU Tigers football team represented Louisiana State University (LSU) as a member of the Southern Conference (SoCon) during the 1923 college football season. Led by first-year head coach Mike Donahue, the Tigers compiled an overall record of 3–5–1 with a mark of 0–3 in conference play. Doc Fenton and Moon Ducote were assistant coaches.

== Schedule ==
Date	Opponent	Site	Result	Attendance	Source
September 29	Louisiana Normal*	State Field; Baton Rouge, LA	W 40–0		
October 6	Southwestern Louisiana*	State Field; Baton Rouge, LA	W 7–3	3,000	
October 13	Spring Hill*	State Field; Baton Rouge, LA	W 33–0	3,500	
October 20	Texas A&M*	State Field; Baton Rouge, LA (rivalry)	L 0–28		
October 27	vs. Arkansas*	Fair Grounds; Shreveport, LA (rivalry)	L 13–26	5,000	
November 2	at Mississippi College*	Vicksburg Fairgrounds; Vicksburg, MS	T 0–0		
November 16	at Alabama	Cramton Bowl; Montgomery, AL (rivalry)	L 3–30		
November 24	at Tulane	Tulane Stadium; New Orleans, LA (Battle for the Rag)	L 0–20	14,000	
December 1	at Mississippi A&M	Scott Field; Starkville, MS (rivalry)	L 7–14	5,000	
*Non-conference game
