= 1923 Georgia Tech Golden Tornado football team =

American college football season

1923 Georgia Tech Golden Tornado football
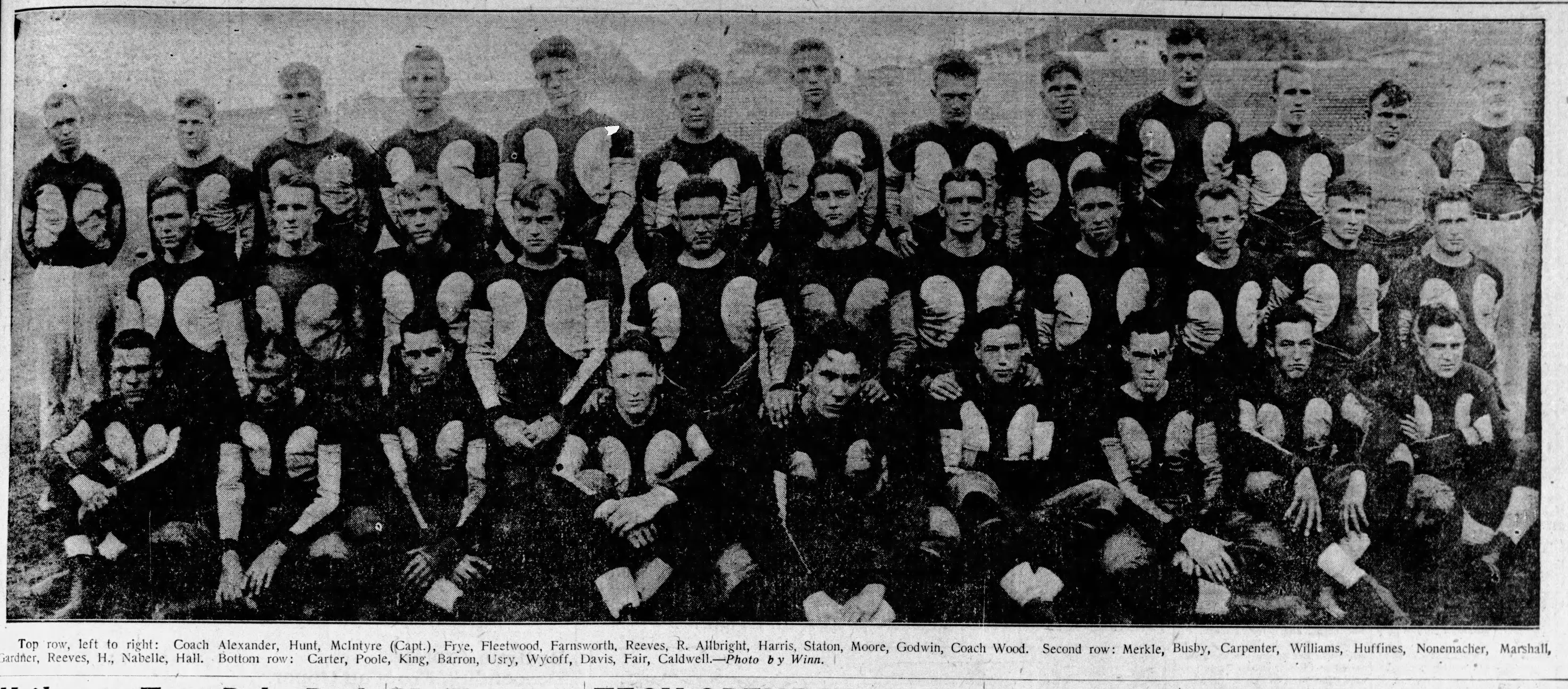
- Conference: Southern Conference
- Record: 3–2–4 (0–0–4 SoCon)
- Head coach: William Alexander (4th season)
- Offensive scheme: Jump shift
- Captain: John McIntyre
- Home stadium: Grant Field

Uniform
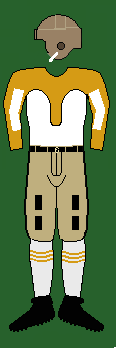

1923 Southern Conference football standings
	Conf.					Overall
Team	W		L		T	W		L		T
Washington & Lee +	4	–	0	–	1	6	–	3	–	1
Vanderbilt * +	3	–	0	–	1	5	–	2	–	1
VPI	4	–	1	–	0	6	–	3	–	0
Alabama	4	–	1	–	1	7	–	2	–	1
Maryland	2	–	1	–	0	7	–	2	–	1
Florida	1	–	0	–	2	6	–	1	–	2
North Carolina	2	–	1	–	1	5	–	3	–	1
Georgia	3	–	2	–	0	5	–	3	–	1
Mississippi A&M	2	–	1	–	2	5	–	2	–	2
Tennessee	4	–	3	–	0	5	–	4	–	1
Tulane	2	–	2	–	1	6	–	3	–	1
Clemson	1	–	1	–	1	5	–	2	–	1
Georgia Tech	0	–	0	–	4	3	–	2	–	4
NC State	1	–	4	–	0	3	–	7	–	0
Auburn	0	–	1	–	3	3	–	3	–	3
Kentucky	0	–	2	–	2	4	–	3	–	2
Virginia	0	–	3	–	1	3	–	5	–	1
LSU	0	–	3	–	0	3	–	5	–	1
Ole Miss	0	–	4	–	0	4	–	6	–	0
South Carolina	0	–	4	–	0	4	–	6	–	0
+ – Conference co-champions; * co-member of SIAA

The 1923 Georgia Tech Golden Tornado football team (Note: Although Georgia Tech's teams are officially known as the "Yellow Jackets", northern writers called the team the "Golden Tornado" in 1917; the name was commonly used until 1928 and for many years afterwards as an alternate nickname. It may have been coined by Morgan Blake.) represented the Georgia Tech Golden Tornado of the Georgia Institute of Technology during the 1923 college football season. Tech had ties in every one of its conference games, and had its worst season in years.

== Before the season ==
Tech used a starting backfield, including sophomore Doug Wycoff, and a "pony backfield" full of smaller, fast substitutes such as Jerry Albright and Frank Harris.

== Schedule ==
Date	Opponent	Site	Result	Attendance	Source
September 29	Oglethorpe*	Grant Field; Atlanta, GA	W 28–13		
October 6	VMI*	Grant Field; Atlanta, GA	W 10–7		
October 13	Florida	Grant Field; Atlanta, GA	T 7–7	12,000	
October 20	Georgetown*	Grant Field; Atlanta, GA	W 20–10	10,000	
October 27	at Notre Dame*	Cartier Field; South Bend, IN (rivalry)	L 7–35	20,000	
November 3	Alabama	Grant Field; Atlanta, GA (rivalry)	T 0–0	10,000	
November 10	at Penn State*	New Beaver Field; State College, PA	L 0–7	10,000	
November 17	Kentucky	Grant Field; Atlanta, GA	T 3–3		
November 29	Auburn	Grant Field; Atlanta, GA (rivalry)	T 0–0	25,000	
*Non-conference game

== Game summaries ==
=== Week 1: Oglethorpe ===
Week 1: Oglethorpe at Georgia Tech

Team	1	2	3	4	Total
Oglethorpe	7	6	0	0	13
• Ga. Tech	7	0	14	7	28

- Date: October 13
- Location: Grant Field
  Atlanta, GA

Oglethorpe led at the half on Tech, but Tech came back to win 28–13.

The starting lineup was: Staton (left end), Carpenter (left tackle), McIntyre (left guard), Frye (center), McConnell (right guard), Usry (right tackle), Gardner (right end), Carter (quarterback), Hunt (left halfback), Reeves (right halfback), Wycoff (fullback).

=== Week 2: VMI ===
Tech beat VMI 10–7. Both teams touchdowns came on interceptions. The starting lineup was: Staton (left end), Merkle (left tackle), McConnell (left guard), Frye (center), McIntyre (right guard), Usry (right tackle), Gardner (right end), I. Williams (quarterback), Hunt (left halfback), Reeves (right halfback), Wycoff (fullback).

=== Week 3: Florida ===
Week 3: Florida at Georgia Tech

Team	1	2	3	4	Total
Florida	7	0	0	0	7
Ga. Tech	0	0	0	7	7

- Date: October 13
- Location: Grant Field
  Atlanta, GA
- Game attendance: 12,000

The game with the Florida Gators brought considerable interest. In front of 12,000 at Grant Field, the Gators were up 7 to 0 until a rush of substitutes in the fourth quarter got the Yellow Jackets the tying score.

The starting lineup was: Staton (left end), Merkle (left tackle), McIntyre (left guard), Frye (center), McConnell (right guard), Usry (right tackle), Gardner (right end), Carter (quarterback), Hunt (left halfback), Farnsworth (right halfback), Wycoff (fullback).

=== Week 4: Georgetown ===
Week 4: Georgetown at Georgia Tech

Team	1	2	3	4	Total
Georgetown	7	3	0	0	10
• Ga. Tech	0	0	14	6	20

- Date: October 20
- Location: Grant Field
  Atlanta, GA

Georgetown led 10–0 at the half, but Tech won 20–10. The starting lineup was: Staton (left end), Merkle (left tackle), McIntyre (left guard), Frye (center), McConnell (right guard), Huffines (right tackle), Gardner (right end), Hunt (quarterback), Williams (left halfback), Reeves (right halfback), Wycoff (fullback).

=== Week 5: at Notre Dame ===
Week 5: Georgia Tech at Notre Dame

Team	1	2	3	4	Total
Ga. Tech	0	0	7	0	7
• Notre Dame	7	7	14	7	35

- Location: South Bend, IN
- Game attendance: 20,000+

Rockne's Notre Dame Fighting Irish subs ran up a 35–7 score. Over 20,000 fans were in attendance. The starting lineup was: Staton (left end), Merrin (left tackle), McIntyre (left guard), Frye (center), McConnell (right guard), Huffines (right tackle), Gardner (right end), Hunt (quarterback), Albright (left halfback), Reeves (right halfback), Wycoff (fullback).

=== Week 6: Alabama ===
Week 6: Alabama at Georgia Tech

Team	1	2	3	4	Total
Alabama	0	0	0	0	0
Ga. Tech	0	0	0	0	0

- Location: Grant Field
  Atlanta, GA
- Game attendance: 10,000

In a driving rain, Tech and Alabama under first year coach Wallace Wade played to a scoreless tie.

=== Week 7: at Penn State ===
Week 7: Georgia Tech at Penn State

Team	1	2	3	4	Total
Ga. Tech	0	0	0	0	0
• Penn State	7	0	0	0	7

- Date: November 10
- Location: State College, PA
- Game start: 2:30 p. m.

Penn State beat Georgia Tech 7–0. The Atlanta Constitution's Paul Warwick protested "these eastern and western invasions."

The starting lineup was: Staton (left end), Usry (left tackle), McIntyre (left guard), Frye (center), McConnell (right guard), Huffines (right tackle), Gardner (right end), Davis (quarterback), Williams (left halfback), Reeves (right halfback), Wycoff (fullback).

=== Week 8: Kentucky ===
Tech used every backfield man in a 3–3 tie to Kentucky.

=== Week 9: Auburn ===
Week 9: Auburn at Georgia Tech

Team	1	2	3	4	Total
Auburn	0	0	0	0	0
Ga. Tech	0	0	0	0	0

- Location: Grant Field
  Atlanta, GA

In awfully muddy conditions, Auburn and Tech fought to a scoreless tie.

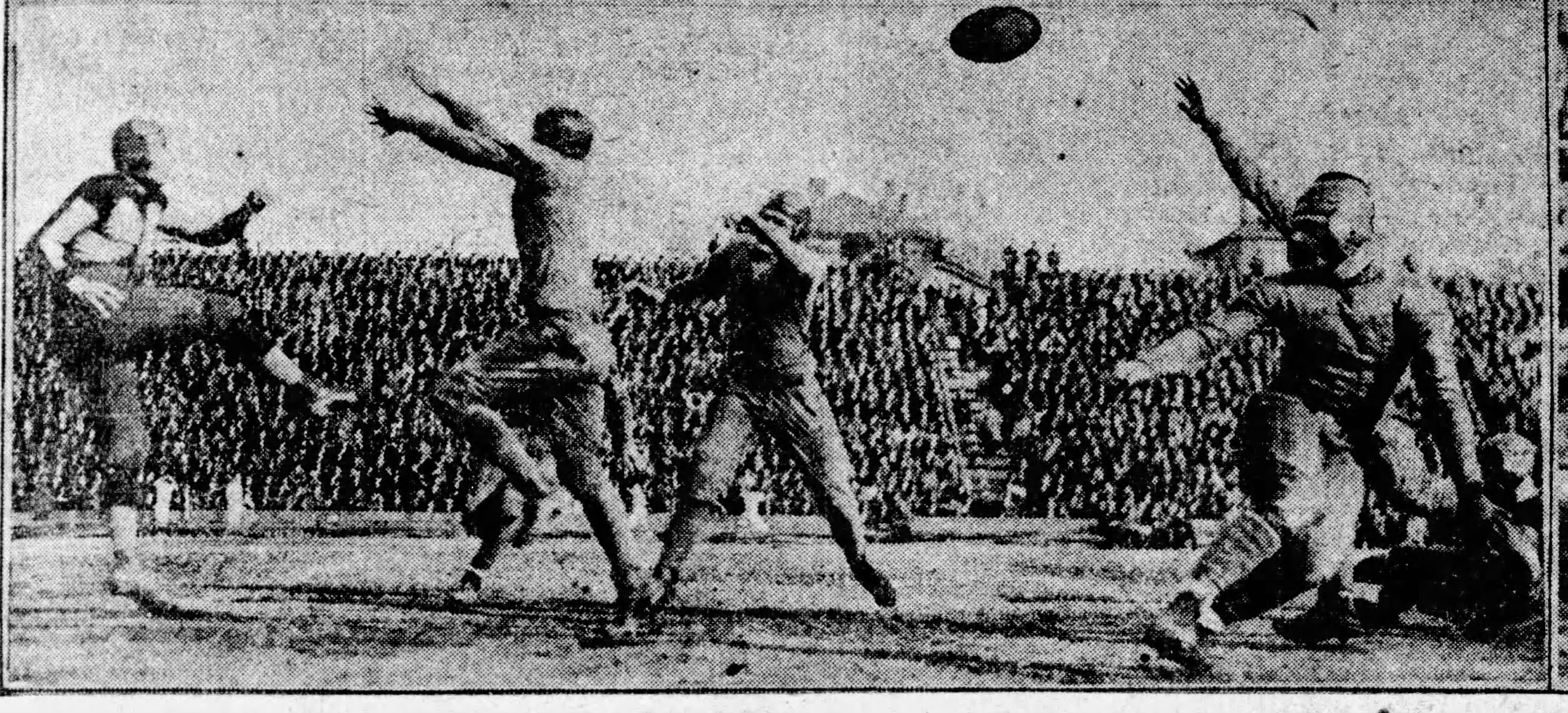
Doug Wycoff punting in the game against Kentucky

== Personnel ==
=== Depth chart ===
The following chart provides a visual depiction of Tech's lineup during the 1923 season with games started at the position reflected in parentheses. The chart mimics the offense after the jump shift has taken place.

LE
John Staton (6)

LT	LG	C	RG	RT
Gus Merkle (3)	John McIntyre (5)	Claire Frye (6)	F. McConnell (5)	Usry (3)
Merrin (1)	F. McConnell (1)		John McIntyre (1)	Huffines(3)
Six Carpenter (1)
Usry (1)				

RE
Gardner (6)

QB
Pinkey Hunt (2)
Carter (2)
Davis (1)
Ike Williams (1)

RHB
Reeves (5)
Bip Farnsworth (1)

FB
Doug Wycoff (6)

LHB
Pinkey Hunt (3)
Ike Williams (2)
Jerry Albright (1)
