= 1923 Oglethorpe Stormy Petrels football team =

American college football season

1923 Oglethorpe Stormy Petrels football
- Conference: Southern Intercollegiate Athletic Association
- Record: 4–6 (3–3 SIAA)
- Head coach: Jim Robertson (1st season)
- Captain: "Jug" Brown

1923 Southern Intercollegiate Athletic Association football standings
	Conf.					Overall
Team	W		L		T	W		L		T
Furman $	4	–	1	–	0	9	–	2	–	0
Centre	2	–	0	–	0	7	–	1	–	1
Vanderbilt*	2	–	0	–	0	5	–	2	–	1
Western Kentucky	2	–	0	–	0	3	–	4	–	0
Mississippi College	3	–	0	–	1	5	–	1	–	2
The Citadel	2	–	1	–	1	5	–	3	–	1
Presbyterian	2	–	1	–	1	4	–	3	–	1
Louisville	2	–	1	–	0	5	–	2	–	0
Sewanee	3	–	2	–	0	5	–	4	–	1
Oglethorpe	3	–	3	–	0	4	–	6	–	0
Chattanooga	1	–	3	–	1	3	–	4	–	2
Howard (AL)	1	–	3	–	1	3	–	4	–	3
Wofford	1	–	3	–	0	6	–	3	–	0
Mercer	2	–	2	–	0	4	–	5	–	0
Millsaps	0	–	1	–	1	0	–	1	–	1
Louisiana College	0	–	1	–	0	0	–	1	–	0
Georgetown (KY)	0	–	1	–	0	0	–	3	–	0
Transylvania	0	–	3	–	0	0	–	3	–	0
Newberry	0	–	4	–	0	2	–	8	–	0
$ – Conference champion; * – co-member of SoCon

The 1923 Oglethorpe Stormy Petrels football team represented Oglethorpe University in the sport of American football during the 1923 college football season. The 1923 season was not without its challenges. The Petrels did not do well in out of conference games, but amassed a decent conference record.

One game of note is the Mercer game. Mercer scored in the opening drive on an 85-yard touchdown run by Kid Cecil, the third longest in southern football history, but missed the extra point. Oglethorpe held Mercer for the whole game until almost the end of the fourth quarter. Oglethorpe scored, which brought the score to 7–6 for Oglethorpe. The tired Oglethorpe team knew the game was not over and tried to fight on. Mercer edged its way to the 15-yard line, but Oglethorpe was able to stop them as the time ran out, securing a Petrel win.

== Schedule ==
Date	Opponent	Site	Result	Source
September 29	at Georgia Tech*	Grant Field; Atlanta, GA	L 13–28	
October 6	at Georgia*	Sanford Field; Athens, GA	L 6–20	
October 20	at Centre	Cheek Field; Danville, KY	L 0–29	
October 27	Sewanee	Grant Field; Atlanta, GA	L 0–13	
November 1	at Wofford	Spartanburg County Fairgrounds; Spartanburg, SC	W 32–0	
November 3	at Furman	Manly Field; Greenville, SC	L 0–29	
November 10	Mercer	Grant Field; Atlanta, GA	W 7–6	
November 17	at Fort Benning*	Driving Park Stadium; Columbus, GA	W 36–0	
November 24	Centenary*	Grant Field; Atlanta, GA	L 0–14	
November 29	at Chattanooga	Chamberlain Field; Chattanooga, TN	W 12–0	
*Non-conference game
