= 1923 Georgia Bulldogs football team =

American college football season

1923 Georgia Bulldogs football
- Conference: Southern Conference
- Record: 5–3–1 (3–2 SoCon)
- Head coach: George Cecil Woodruff (1st season)
- Captain: Joe Bennett
- Home stadium: Sanford Field

1923 Southern Conference football standings
| | Conf. | | | | | Overall |
| Team | W | | L | | T | W | | L | | T |
|---|---|---|---|---|---|---|---|---|---|---|
| Washington & Lee + | 4 | – | 0 | – | 1 | 6 | – | 3 | – | 1 |
| Vanderbilt * + | 3 | – | 0 | – | 1 | 5 | – | 2 | – | 1 |
| VPI | 4 | – | 1 | – | 0 | 6 | – | 3 | – | 0 |
| Alabama | 4 | – | 1 | – | 1 | 7 | – | 2 | – | 1 |
| Maryland | 2 | – | 1 | – | 0 | 7 | – | 2 | – | 1 |
| Florida | 1 | – | 0 | – | 2 | 6 | – | 1 | – | 2 |
| North Carolina | 2 | – | 1 | – | 1 | 5 | – | 3 | – | 1 |
| Georgia | 3 | – | 2 | – | 0 | 5 | – | 3 | – | 1 |
| Mississippi A&M | 2 | – | 1 | – | 2 | 5 | – | 2 | – | 2 |
| Tennessee | 4 | – | 3 | – | 0 | 5 | – | 4 | – | 1 |
| Tulane | 2 | – | 2 | – | 1 | 6 | – | 3 | – | 1 |
| Clemson | 1 | – | 1 | – | 1 | 5 | – | 2 | – | 1 |
| Georgia Tech | 0 | – | 0 | – | 4 | 3 | – | 2 | – | 4 |
| NC State | 1 | – | 4 | – | 0 | 3 | – | 7 | – | 0 |
| Auburn | 0 | – | 1 | – | 3 | 3 | – | 3 | – | 3 |
| Kentucky | 0 | – | 2 | – | 2 | 4 | – | 3 | – | 2 |
| Virginia | 0 | – | 3 | – | 1 | 3 | – | 5 | – | 1 |
| LSU | 0 | – | 3 | – | 0 | 3 | – | 5 | – | 1 |
| Ole Miss | 0 | – | 4 | – | 0 | 4 | – | 6 | – | 0 |
| South Carolina | 0 | – | 4 | – | 0 | 4 | – | 6 | – | 0 |
+ – Conference co-champions; * co-member of SIAA

The 1923 Georgia Bulldogs football team represented the University of Georgia during the 1923 college football season; the 30th season of football played at Georgia since the football program started in 1892 (no football was played in 1917 or 1918 during World War I). Led by first-year head coach and former player George Cecil Woodruff, the Bulldogs completed the season with a 5–3–1 record. One of the assistant coaches was Harry Mehre, who was to succeed Woodruff as head coach in 1928. Bulldogs tackle and captain Joe Bennett was named an All-American for the second year in 1923, becoming the first two-time All-American in Georgia Bulldogs football history.

== Schedule ==
| Date | Opponent | Site | Result | Attendance | Source |
|---|---|---|---|---|---|
| September 29 | Mercer* | Sanford Field; Athens, GA | W 7–0 | | |
| October 6 | Oglethorpe* | Sanford Field; Athens, GA | W 20–0 | | |
| October 13 | at Yale* | Yale Bowl; New Haven, CT | L 0–40 | | |
| October 20 | Tennessee | Shields–Watkins Field; Knoxville, TN (rivalry) | W 17–0 | | |
| November 3 | vs. Auburn | Memorial Stadium; Columbus, GA (rivalry) | W 7–0 | | |
| November 10 | Virginia^{†} | Sanford Field; Athens, GA | W 13–0 | | |
| November 17 | at Vanderbilt | Dudley Field; Nashville, TN (rivalry) | L 7–35 | 15,000 | |
| November 24 | at Alabama | Cramton Bowl; Montgomery, AL (rivalry) | L 0–36 | | |
| December 1 | Centre* | Sanford Field; Athens, GA | T 3–3 | | |
*Non-conference game; ^{†}Homecoming
