= 1923 Washington and Lee Generals football team =

American college football season

1923 Washington and Lee Generals football

SoCon co-champion
- Conference: Southern Conference
- Record: 6–2–1 (4–0–1 SoCon)
- Head coach: Jimmy DeHart (2nd season)
- Captain: Marv Mattox
- Home stadium: Wilson Field

1923 Southern Conference football standings
	Conf.					Overall
Team	W		L		T	W		L		T
Washington & Lee +	4	–	0	–	1	6	–	3	–	1
Vanderbilt * +	3	–	0	–	1	5	–	2	–	1
VPI	4	–	1	–	0	6	–	3	–	0
Alabama	4	–	1	–	1	7	–	2	–	1
Maryland	2	–	1	–	0	7	–	2	–	1
Florida	1	–	0	–	2	6	–	1	–	2
North Carolina	2	–	1	–	1	5	–	3	–	1
Georgia	3	–	2	–	0	5	–	3	–	1
Mississippi A&M	2	–	1	–	2	5	–	2	–	2
Tennessee	4	–	3	–	0	5	–	4	–	1
Tulane	2	–	2	–	1	6	–	3	–	1
Clemson	1	–	1	–	1	5	–	2	–	1
Georgia Tech	0	–	0	–	4	3	–	2	–	4
NC State	1	–	4	–	0	3	–	7	–	0
Auburn	0	–	1	–	3	3	–	3	–	3
Kentucky	0	–	2	–	2	4	–	3	–	2
Virginia	0	–	3	–	1	3	–	5	–	1
LSU	0	–	3	–	0	3	–	5	–	1
Ole Miss	0	–	4	–	0	4	–	6	–	0
South Carolina	0	–	4	–	0	4	–	6	–	0
+ – Conference co-champions; * co-member of SIAA

The 1923 Washington and Lee Generals football team represented Washington and Lee University during the 1923 college football season. The Generals competed in the Southern Conference (SoCon) and were coached by Jimmy DeHart in his second year as head coach, compiling a 6–2–1 record overall with a 4–0–1 mark in SoCon play.

The Generals were scheduled to play at Washington & Jefferson on October 6. This game was canceled after Washington and Lee refused to take the field after Washington & Jefferson declined to keep African-American halfback Charles Fremont West out of the game.

== Schedule ==
Date	Opponent	Site	Result	Attendance	Source
September 29	Western Maryland*	Wilson Field; Lexington, VA	W 19–7		
October 6	at Washington & Jefferson*	College Field; Washington, PA	Canceled		
October 13	at Kentucky	Stoll Field; Lexington, KY	T 6–6		
October 20	St. John's (MD)*	Wilson Field; Lexington, VA	W 28–0		
October 27	vs. VPI	Fairgrounds; Lynchburg, VA	W 12–0		
November 3	Virginia	Wilson Field; Lexington, VA	W 7–0	7,500	
November 10	vs. West Virginia*	Laidley Field; Charleston, WV	L 0–63		
November 17	at South Carolina	University Field; Columbia, SC	W 13–7		
November 24	vs. Centre*	Parkway Field; Louisville, KY	L 0–19	12,000	
November 29	vs. NC State	League Park; Norfolk, VA	W 20–12		
*Non-conference game
