= 1923 North Carolina Tar Heels football team =

American college football season

1923 North Carolina Tar Heels football
- Conference: Southern Conference
- Record: 5–3–1 (2–1–1 SoCon)
- Head coach: Bob Fetzer & Bill Fetzer (3rd season)
- Captain: Roy Morris
- Home stadium: Emerson Field

1923 Southern Conference football standings
	Conf.					Overall
Team	W		L		T	W		L		T
Washington & Lee +	4	–	0	–	1	6	–	3	–	1
Vanderbilt * +	3	–	0	–	1	5	–	2	–	1
VPI	4	–	1	–	0	6	–	3	–	0
Alabama	4	–	1	–	1	7	–	2	–	1
Maryland	2	–	1	–	0	7	–	2	–	1
Florida	1	–	0	–	2	6	–	1	–	2
North Carolina	2	–	1	–	1	5	–	3	–	1
Georgia	3	–	2	–	0	5	–	3	–	1
Mississippi A&M	2	–	1	–	2	5	–	2	–	2
Tennessee	4	–	3	–	0	5	–	4	–	1
Tulane	2	–	2	–	1	6	–	3	–	1
Clemson	1	–	1	–	1	5	–	2	–	1
Georgia Tech	0	–	0	–	4	3	–	2	–	4
NC State	1	–	4	–	0	3	–	7	–	0
Auburn	0	–	1	–	3	3	–	3	–	3
Kentucky	0	–	2	–	2	4	–	3	–	2
Virginia	0	–	3	–	1	3	–	5	–	1
LSU	0	–	3	–	0	3	–	5	–	1
Ole Miss	0	–	4	–	0	4	–	6	–	0
South Carolina	0	–	4	–	0	4	–	6	–	0
+ – Conference co-champions; * co-member of SIAA

The 1923 North Carolina Tar Heels football team represented the University of North Carolina (now known as the University of North Carolina at Chapel Hill) during the 1924 college football season as a member of the Southern Conference (SoCon). The Tar Heels were led by head coaches Bob Fetzer and Bill Fetzer in their third season and finished with a record of five wins, three losses, and one tie (5–3–1 overall, 2–1–1 in the SoCon).

== Schedule ==
Date	Time	Opponent	Site	Result	Attendance	Source
September 29		Wake Forest	Emerson Field; Chapel Hill, NC (rivalry)	W 22–0	3,401	
October 6	3:00 p.m.	at Yale*	Yale Bowl; New Haven, CT	L 0–53	20,000	
October 12	3:00 p.m.	at Trinity (NC)*	Hanes Field; Durham, NC (rivalry)	W 14–6	4,000	
October 18	2:30 p.m.	at NC State	Riddick Field; Raleigh, NC (rivalry)	W 14–0	10,895	
October 27	2:30 p.m.	at Maryland	Byrd Stadium; College Park, MD	L 0–14	2,000	
November 3		at South Carolina	University Field; Columbia, SC (rivalry)	W 13–0	3,500	
November 10	2:30 p.m.	vs. VMI*	Mayo Island Park; Richmond, VA	L 0–9	7,971	
November 17		Davidson*	Emerson Field; Chapel Hill, NC	W 14–3	2,694	
November 29	2:00 p.m.	Virginia	Emerson Field; Chapel Hill, NC (rivalry)	T 0–0	14,231	
*Non-conference game; All times are in Eastern time
