= 1923 South Carolina Gamecocks football team =

American college football season

1923 South Carolina Gamecocks football
- Conference: Southern Conference
- Record: 4–6 (0–4 SoCon)
- Head coach: Sol Metzger (4th season)
- Captain: W. J. Wheeler
- Home stadium: University Field

1923 Southern Conference football standings
	Conf.					Overall
Team	W		L		T	W		L		T
Washington & Lee +	4	–	0	–	1	6	–	3	–	1
Vanderbilt * +	3	–	0	–	1	5	–	2	–	1
VPI	4	–	1	–	0	6	–	3	–	0
Alabama	4	–	1	–	1	7	–	2	–	1
Maryland	2	–	1	–	0	7	–	2	–	1
Florida	1	–	0	–	2	6	–	1	–	2
North Carolina	2	–	1	–	1	5	–	3	–	1
Georgia	3	–	2	–	0	5	–	3	–	1
Mississippi A&M	2	–	1	–	2	5	–	2	–	2
Tennessee	4	–	3	–	0	5	–	4	–	1
Tulane	2	–	2	–	1	6	–	3	–	1
Clemson	1	–	1	–	1	5	–	2	–	1
Georgia Tech	0	–	0	–	4	3	–	2	–	4
NC State	1	–	4	–	0	3	–	7	–	0
Auburn	0	–	1	–	3	3	–	3	–	3
Kentucky	0	–	2	–	2	4	–	3	–	2
Virginia	0	–	3	–	1	3	–	5	–	1
LSU	0	–	3	–	0	3	–	5	–	1
Ole Miss	0	–	4	–	0	4	–	6	–	0
South Carolina	0	–	4	–	0	4	–	6	–	0
+ – Conference co-champions; * co-member of SIAA

The 1923 South Carolina Gamecocks football team represented the University of South Carolina during the 1923 Southern Conference football season. Led by fourth-year head coach Sol Metzger, the Gamecocks compiled an overall record of 4–6 with a mark of 0–4 in conference play, tying for 19th place in the SoCon.

== Schedule ==
Date	Opponent	Site	Result	Attendance	Source
September 29	Erskine*	University Field; Columbia, SC	W 35–0	2,000	
October 6	Presbyterian*	University Field; Columbia, SC	L 3–7	2,000	
October 13	at NC State	Riddick Stadium; Raleigh, NC	L 0–7		
October 19	Newberry*	University Field; Columbia, SC	W 24–0		
October 25	Clemson	State Fairgrounds; Columbia, SC (rivalry)	L 6–7		
November 3	North Carolina	University Field; Columbia, SC (rivalry)	L 0–13		
November 10	at Furman*	Manly Field; Greenville, SC	L 3–23	3,500	
November 15	vs. The Citadel*	County Fairgrounds; Orangeburg, SC	W 12–0		
November 17	Washington and Lee	University Field; Columbia, SC	L 7–13		
November 29	Wake Forest*	University Field; Columbia, SC	W 14–7		
*Non-conference game
