= 1923 Ole Miss Rebels football team =

American college football season

1923 Ole Miss Rebels football
- Conference: Southern Conference
- Record: 4–6 (0–4 SoCon)
- Head coach: Roland Cowell (2nd season)
- Home stadium: Hemingway Stadium

1923 Southern Conference football standings
	Conf.					Overall
Team	W		L		T	W		L		T
Washington & Lee +	4	–	0	–	1	6	–	3	–	1
Vanderbilt * +	3	–	0	–	1	5	–	2	–	1
VPI	4	–	1	–	0	6	–	3	–	0
Alabama	4	–	1	–	1	7	–	2	–	1
Maryland	2	–	1	–	0	7	–	2	–	1
Florida	1	–	0	–	2	6	–	1	–	2
North Carolina	2	–	1	–	1	5	–	3	–	1
Georgia	3	–	2	–	0	5	–	3	–	1
Mississippi A&M	2	–	1	–	2	5	–	2	–	2
Tennessee	4	–	3	–	0	5	–	4	–	1
Tulane	2	–	2	–	1	6	–	3	–	1
Clemson	1	–	1	–	1	5	–	2	–	1
Georgia Tech	0	–	0	–	4	3	–	2	–	4
NC State	1	–	4	–	0	3	–	7	–	0
Auburn	0	–	1	–	3	3	–	3	–	3
Kentucky	0	–	2	–	2	4	–	3	–	2
Virginia	0	–	3	–	1	3	–	5	–	1
LSU	0	–	3	–	0	3	–	5	–	1
Ole Miss	0	–	4	–	0	4	–	6	–	0
South Carolina	0	–	4	–	0	4	–	6	–	0
+ – Conference co-champions; * co-member of SIAA

The 1923 Ole Miss Rebels football team was an American football team that represented the University of Mississippi (Ole Miss) in the Southern Conference during the 1923 college football season. In their second season under head coach Roland Cowell, the Rebels compiled a 4–6 record (0–4 against conference opponents).

== Schedule ==
Date	Opponent	Site	Result	Attendance	Source
September 29	Bethel (TN)*	Hemingway Stadium; Oxford, MS	W 14–6		
October 6	at Alabama	Denny Field; Tuscaloosa, AL	L 0–56		
October 13	Southwestern Presbyterian*	Hemingway Stadium; Oxford, MS	W 33–0		
October 20	vs. Mississippi A&M	State Fairgrounds; Jackson, MS	L 6–13	8,000	
October 27	at Saint Louis*	Sportsman's Park; St. Louis, MO	L 3–28	5,000	
November 3	Birmingham–Southern*	Hemingway Stadium; Oxford, MS	W 6–0		
November 10	vs. Mississippi College*	Mississippi-Alabama Fair Grounds; Meridian, MS	L 0–6		
November 17	at Tulane	Tulane Stadium; New Orleans, LA	L 0–19		
November 24	at Tennessee	Shields–Watkins Field; Knoxville, TN (rivalry)	L 0–10		
December 1	at Fort Benning*	Driving Park Stadium; Columbus, GA	W 19–7		
*Non-conference game
