= M. S. Bennett =

American athlete and politician (1881-1964)

Biographical details
- Born: April 10, 1881; Montgomery County, Pennsylvania, U.S.
- Died: December 26, 1964 (aged 83); Bristol Township, Pennsylvania, U.S.

Playing career

Football
- 1900–1903: Penn

Basketball
- 1900–1904: Penn
- Position: End (football)

Coaching career (HC unless noted)

Football
- 1914–1921: Haverford
- 1923–1928: Sewanee

Basketball
- 1919–1921: Haverford
- 1924–1926: Sewanee

Baseball
- 1917–1921: Haverford

Administrative career (AD unless noted)
- 1923–1930: Sewanee

Head coaching record
- Overall: 39–54–10 (football); 2–29 (baseball)

Michael Smith Bennett (April 10, 1881 – December 26, 1964) was an American college football, college basketball, and college baseball player, coach, athletics administrator, dentist, and politician.

== Early life ==
Bennett was born in Montgomery County, Pennsylvania, near Willow Grove and Fitzwatertown, on April 10, 1881. He was one of the eight children, the fourth son, of Elias Roland Bennett and Catherine Carolan. His father came from a family of Bucks County farmers. Elias served during the Civil War in the 1st New Jersey Cavalry Regiment and deserted after the Grand Review to marry Catherine Carolan, an Irish immigrant and refugee of the Great Hunger. He met her while working on a farm near Willow Grove. Michael Bennett's mother, Catherine, was born in Springville, Kells Parish, County Meath, Ireland, and came to the U.S. at age four in 1847 aboard the Patrick Henry. Michael Bennett was likely named for his mother's great-grandfather, a flax grower, and her brother, a blacksmith and horseshoer in Dreshertown, Feltonville and Franklinville, respectively.

== Dentistry, athletics, politics ==
Bennett graduated from the University of Pennsylvania with a Doctor of Dental Surgery degree in 1905. He practiced dentistry most of his life in the Olney neighborhood of Philadelphia.

He married Lucy A. Stumpf and they had two sons: Michael John Bennett, M.D., and George Penniman Bennett, M.D.

He played college football, baseball and basketball for the Penn Quakers. Afterward, he coached football at Mercersburg Academy and Chestnut Hill College. Later, he was named the director of athletics and head football coach at Sewanee: The University of the South.

Bennett served on the Philadelphia City Council from 1916 to 1917 and was elected in 1917 as a Republican to the Pennsylvania House of Representatives. He did not seek reelection in 1918.

In 1929, he visited the Mexican president to promote American collegiate football.

Bennett died on December 26, 1964.

== Head coaching record ==
=== Football ===
Year	Team	Overall	Conference	Standing	Bowl/playoffs
Haverford (Independent) (1914–1921)
1914	Haverford	3–3–1			
1915	Haverford	5–3			
1916	Haverford	5–0–3			
1917	Haverford	1–5–2			
1918	No team—World War I				
1919	Haverford	2–4–1			
1920	Haverford	1–5–1			
1921	Haverford	1–5–1			
Haverford:		18–25–9			
Sewanee Tigers (Southern Intercollegiate Athletic Association) (1923)
1923	Sewanee	5–4–1	3–2	9th	
Sewanee Tigers (Southern Conference / Southern Intercollegiate Athletic Association) (1924)
1924	Sewanee	6–4	3–2 / 2–1	T–6th / T–6th	
Sewanee Tigers (Southern Conference) (1925–1928)
1923	Sewanee	4–4–1	1–4	T–16th	
1926	Sewanee	2–6	0–5	22nd	
1927	Sewanee	2–6	1–4	20th	
1928	Sewanee	2–7	0–5	21st	
Sewanee:		21–29–1	9–23		
Total:		39–54–10			
