= 1926 Sewanee Tigers football team =

American college football season

1926 Sewanee Tigers football
- Conference: Southern Conference
- Record: 2–6 (0–5 SoCon)
- Head coach: M. S. Bennett (4th season)
- Captain: Jack Todd
- Home stadium: Hardee Field

1926 Southern Conference football standings
	Conf.					Overall
Team	W		L		T	W		L		T
No. 7 Alabama $	8	–	0	–	0	9	–	0	–	1
Tennessee	5	–	1	–	0	8	–	1	–	0
Vanderbilt	4	–	1	–	0	8	–	1	–	0
South Carolina	4	–	2	–	0	6	–	4	–	0
Georgia	4	–	2	–	0	5	–	4	–	0
Virginia	4	–	2	–	1	6	–	2	–	2
VPI	3	–	2	–	1	5	–	3	–	1
Washington and Lee	3	–	2	–	1	4	–	3	–	2
Georgia Tech	4	–	3	–	0	4	–	5	–	0
North Carolina	3	–	3	–	0	4	–	5	–	0
Auburn	3	–	3	–	0	5	–	4	–	0
LSU	3	–	3	–	0	6	–	3	–	0
Ole Miss	2	–	2	–	0	5	–	4	–	0
Mississippi A&M	2	–	3	–	0	5	–	4	–	0
VMI	2	–	4	–	0	5	–	5	–	0
Tulane	2	–	4	–	0	3	–	5	–	1
Maryland	1	–	3	–	1	5	–	4	–	1
Clemson	1	–	3	–	0	2	–	7	–	0
Florida	1	–	4	–	1	2	–	6	–	2
Kentucky	1	–	4	–	1	2	–	6	–	1
NC State	0	–	4	–	0	4	–	6	–	0
Sewanee	0	–	5	–	0	2	–	6	–	0
$ – Conference champion; Rankings from Dickinson System

The 1926 Sewanee Tigers football team was an American football team that represented the Sewanee: The University of the South as a member of the Southern Conference during the 1926 college football season. Led by M. S. Bennett in his fourth season as head coach, the Tigers compiled an overall record of 2–6 with a mark of 0–5 in conference play. Guard and fullback Orin Helvey held Alabama to just two points.

== Schedule ==
Date	Opponent	Site	Result	Source
September 25	Bryson College*	Hardee Field; Sewanee, TN	W 15–6	
October 2	Middle Tennessee State Teachers*	Hardee Field; Sewanee, TN	W 48–0	
October 9	at Texas A&M*	Fair Park Stadium; Dallas, TX	L 3–6	
October 23	at Alabama	Rickwood Field; Birmingham, AL	L 0–2	
October 30	at Auburn	Cramton Bowl; Montgomery, AL	L 0–9	
November 6	at Tennessee	Shields–Watkins Field; Knoxville, TN	L 0–12	
November 13	at Tulane	Tulane Stadium; New Orleans, LA	L 7–19	
November 25	at Vanderbilt	Dudley Field; Nashville, TN (rivalry)	L 0–13	
*Non-conference game
