= 1923 Chattanooga Moccasins football team =

American college football season

1923 Chattanooga Moccasins football
- Conference: Southern Intercollegiate Athletic Association
- Record: 3–4–2 (1–3–1 SIAA)
- Head coach: Bill McAllester (2nd season)
- Captain: Harry Cate
- Home stadium: Chamberlain Field

1923 Southern Intercollegiate Athletic Association football standings
	Conf.					Overall
Team	W		L		T	W		L		T
Furman $	4	–	1	–	0	9	–	2	–	0
Centre	2	–	0	–	0	7	–	1	–	1
Vanderbilt*	2	–	0	–	0	5	–	2	–	1
Western Kentucky	2	–	0	–	0	3	–	4	–	0
Mississippi College	3	–	0	–	1	5	–	1	–	2
The Citadel	2	–	1	–	1	5	–	3	–	1
Presbyterian	2	–	1	–	1	4	–	3	–	1
Louisville	2	–	1	–	0	5	–	2	–	0
Sewanee	3	–	2	–	0	5	–	4	–	1
Oglethorpe	3	–	3	–	0	4	–	6	–	0
Chattanooga	1	–	3	–	1	3	–	4	–	2
Howard (AL)	1	–	3	–	1	3	–	4	–	3
Wofford	1	–	3	–	0	6	–	3	–	0
Mercer	2	–	2	–	0	4	–	5	–	0
Millsaps	0	–	1	–	1	0	–	1	–	1
Louisiana College	0	–	1	–	0	0	–	1	–	0
Georgetown (KY)	0	–	1	–	0	0	–	3	–	0
Transylvania	0	–	3	–	0	0	–	3	–	0
Newberry	0	–	4	–	0	2	–	8	–	0
$ – Conference champion; * – co-member of SoCon

The 1923 Chattanooga Moccasins football team was an American football team that represented the University of Chattanooga (now known as the University of Tennessee at Chattanooga) as a member of the Southern Intercollegiate Athletic Association (SIAA) during the 1923 college football season. In their second year under head coach Bill McAllester, the team compiled a 3–4–2 record.

== Schedule ==
Date	Opponent	Site	Result	Source
September 28	Bryson College*	Chamberlain Field; Chattanooga, TN	W 35–0	
October 6	at Centenary*	State Fairgrounds; Shreveport, LA	L 7–46	
October 13	Cumberland (TN)*	Chamberlain Field; Chattanooga, TN	T 19–19	
October 20	at Mercer	Centennial Field; Macon, GA	L 3–18	
October 27	at Transylvania	Thomas Field; Lexington, KY	W 6–3	
November 3	Sewanee	Chamberlain Field; Chattanooga, TN	L 0–26	
November 9	vs. Birmingham–Southern*	Dwight Park; Gadsden, AL	W 19–0	
November 17	Howard (AL)	Chamberlain Field; Chattanooga, TN	T 0–0	
November 29	Oglethorpe	Chamberlain Field; Chattanooga, TN	L 0–12	
*Non-conference game
