= 1923 Sewanee Tigers football team =

American college football season

1923 Sewanee Tigers football
- Conference: Southern Intercollegiate Athletic Association
- Record: 5–4–1 (3–2 SIAA)
- Head coach: M. S. Bennett (1st season)
- Captain: Cooper Litton
- Home stadium: Hardee Field

1923 Southern Intercollegiate Athletic Association football standings
	Conf.					Overall
Team	W		L		T	W		L		T
Furman $	4	–	1	–	0	9	–	2	–	0
Centre	2	–	0	–	0	7	–	1	–	1
Vanderbilt*	2	–	0	–	0	5	–	2	–	1
Western Kentucky	2	–	0	–	0	3	–	4	–	0
Mississippi College	3	–	0	–	1	5	–	1	–	2
The Citadel	2	–	1	–	1	5	–	3	–	1
Presbyterian	2	–	1	–	1	4	–	3	–	1
Louisville	2	–	1	–	0	5	–	2	–	0
Sewanee	3	–	2	–	0	5	–	4	–	1
Oglethorpe	3	–	3	–	0	4	–	6	–	0
Chattanooga	1	–	3	–	1	3	–	4	–	2
Howard (AL)	1	–	3	–	1	3	–	4	–	3
Wofford	1	–	3	–	0	6	–	3	–	0
Mercer	2	–	2	–	0	4	–	5	–	0
Millsaps	0	–	1	–	1	0	–	1	–	1
Louisiana College	0	–	1	–	0	0	–	1	–	0
Georgetown (KY)	0	–	1	–	0	0	–	3	–	0
Transylvania	0	–	3	–	0	0	–	3	–	0
Newberry	0	–	4	–	0	2	–	8	–	0
$ – Conference champion; * – co-member of SoCon

The 1923 Sewanee Tigers football team represented Sewanee: The University of the South during the 1923 college football season as a member of the Southern Intercollegiate Athletic Association (SIAA). The Tigers were led by head coach M. S. Bennett in his first season and finished with a record of five wins, four losses, and one tie (5–4–1 overall, 3–2 in the SIAA).

== Schedule ==
Date	Opponent	Site	Result	Attendance	Source
September 22	Carson–Newman*	Hardee Field; Sewanee, TN	T 0–0		
September 29	Howard (AL)	Hardee Field; Sewanee, TN	W 3–2		
October 6	Southwestern Presbyterian*	Hardee Field; Sewanee, TN (rivalry)	W 34–0		
October 13	vs. Texas A&M*	Fair Park Stadium; Dallas, TX	L 0–14		
October 20	at Alabama*	Rickwood Field; Birmingham, AL	L 0–7	10,000	
October 27	at Oglethorpe	Grant Field; Atlanta, GA	W 13–0		
November 3	at Chattanooga	Chamberlain Field; Chattanooga, TN	W 26–0		
November 10	vs. Centre	Russwood Park; Memphis, TN	L 6–20	10,000	
November 17	Maryville (TN)*	Hardee Field; Sewanee, TN	W 20–0		
November 29	at Vanderbilt	Dudley Field; Nashville, TN (rivalry)	L 0–7	15,000–17,500	
*Non-conference game
