= 1923 Maryland Aggies football team =

American college football season

1923 Maryland Aggies football
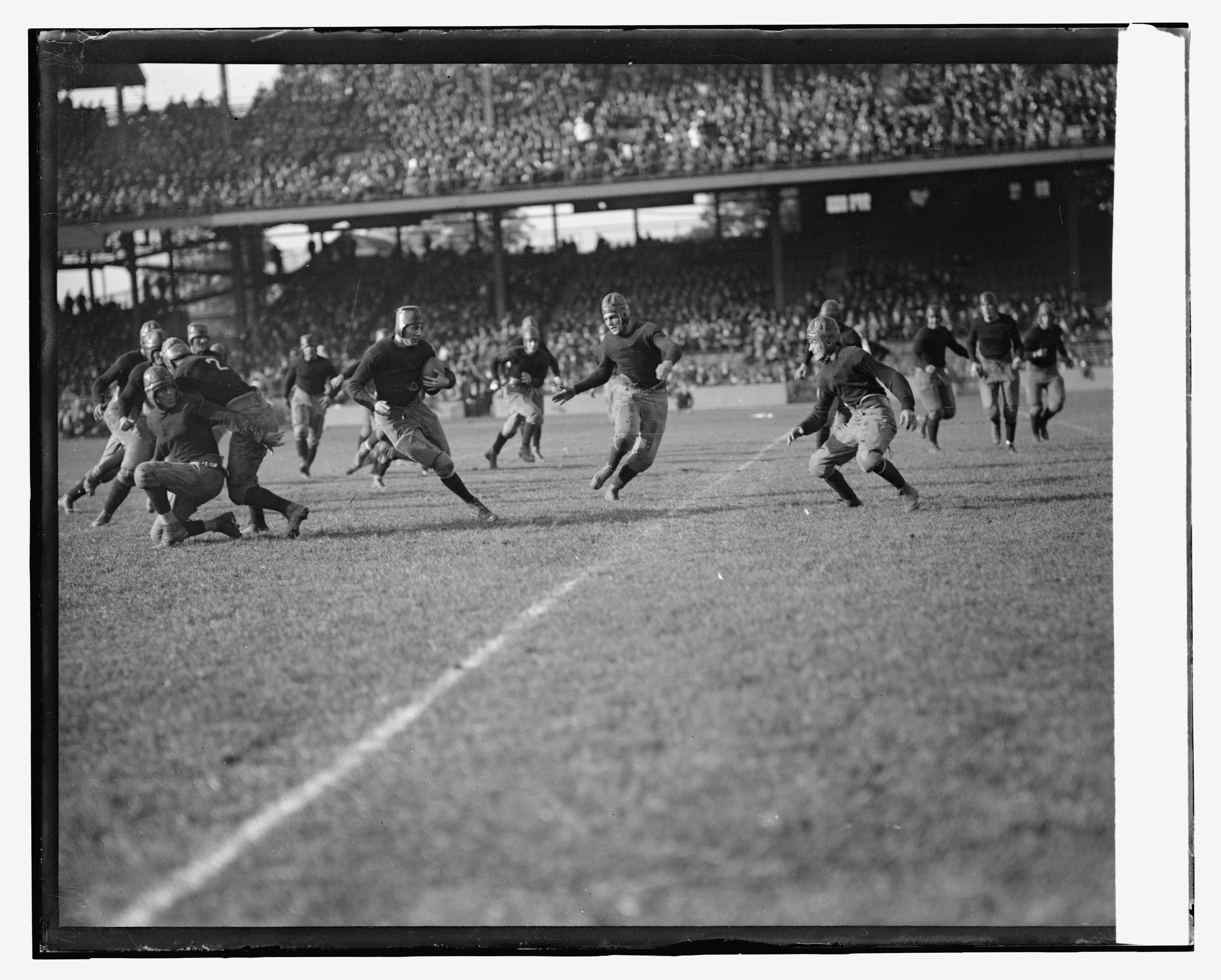
- Maryland Aggies vs. VPI Gobblers (20 October 1923)
- Conference: Southern Conference
- Record: 7–2–1 (2–1 SoCon)
- Head coach: Curley Byrd (13th season)
- Home stadium: Byrd Stadium (original)

1923 Southern Conference football standings
	Conf.					Overall
Team	W		L		T	W		L		T
Washington & Lee +	4	–	0	–	1	6	–	3	–	1
Vanderbilt * +	3	–	0	–	1	5	–	2	–	1
VPI	4	–	1	–	0	6	–	3	–	0
Alabama	4	–	1	–	1	7	–	2	–	1
Maryland	2	–	1	–	0	7	–	2	–	1
Florida	1	–	0	–	2	6	–	1	–	2
North Carolina	2	–	1	–	1	5	–	3	–	1
Georgia	3	–	2	–	0	5	–	3	–	1
Mississippi A&M	2	–	1	–	2	5	–	2	–	2
Tennessee	4	–	3	–	0	5	–	4	–	1
Tulane	2	–	2	–	1	6	–	3	–	1
Clemson	1	–	1	–	1	5	–	2	–	1
Georgia Tech	0	–	0	–	4	3	–	2	–	4
NC State	1	–	4	–	0	3	–	7	–	0
Auburn	0	–	1	–	3	3	–	3	–	3
Kentucky	0	–	2	–	2	4	–	3	–	2
Virginia	0	–	3	–	1	3	–	5	–	1
LSU	0	–	3	–	0	3	–	5	–	1
Ole Miss	0	–	4	–	0	4	–	6	–	0
South Carolina	0	–	4	–	0	4	–	6	–	0
+ – Conference co-champions; * co-member of SIAA

The 1923 Maryland Aggies football team was an American football team that represented the University of Maryland in the Southern Conference during the 1923 college football season. In their 13th season under head coach Curley Byrd, the Aggies compiled a 7–2–1 record (2–1 in conference), finished seventh in the conference, and outscored opponents by a total of 214 to 56. The team shutout five of its opponents and held Johns Hopkins and Catholic to just six points apiece.

In 1923, the original Byrd Stadium, for which coach Byrd had petitioned for funding, was completed at a cost of $60,000 with a maximum capacity of 10,000. Burton Shipley, former quarterback and future basketball coach, was an assistant coach. The only losses came at Yale and against Virginia Tech. Maryland led Yale, 14–12, at halftime, but a referee ruled incomplete a drop kick that Byrd claimed was good by a "country mile". Yale won the game, 16–14. Mainly for his performance against Yale and Penn, end Bill "Zeke" Supplee was named an All-American by the Associated Press. He was the first Maryland player honored as such.

== Schedule ==
Date	Opponent	Site	Result	Attendance	Source
September 29	Randolph–Macon*	Byrd Stadium; College Park, MD	W 53–0		
October 6	at Penn*	Franklin Field; Philadelphia, PA	W 3–0	40,000	
October 13	Richmond*	Byrd Stadium; College Park, MD	W 23–0		
October 20	vs. VPI	Griffith Stadium; Washington, DC	L 7–16		
October 27	North Carolina	Byrd Stadium; College Park, MD	W 14–0		
November 3	St. John's (MD)*	Byrd Stadium; College Park, MD	W 28–0		
November 10	at Yale*	Yale Bowl; New Haven, CT	L 14–16	20,000	
November 17	at NC State	Riddick Stadium; Raleigh, NC	W 26–12		
November 24	Catholic University*	Byrd Stadium; College Park, MD	W 40–6	> 5,000	
November 29	Johns Hopkins*	Baltimore Stadium; Baltimore, MD	T 6–6	20,000	
*Non-conference game
