= 1923 Furman Purple Hurricane football team =

American college football season

1923 Furman Purple Hurricane football

SIAA champion
- Conference: Southern Intercollegiate Athletic Association
- Record: 9–2 (4–1 SIAA)
- Head coach: Billy Laval (9th season)
- Captain: Blackie Carter
- Home stadium: Manly Field

1923 Southern Intercollegiate Athletic Association football standings
	Conf.					Overall
Team	W		L		T	W		L		T
Furman $	4	–	1	–	0	9	–	2	–	0
Centre	2	–	0	–	0	7	–	1	–	1
Vanderbilt*	2	–	0	–	0	5	–	2	–	1
Western Kentucky	2	–	0	–	0	3	–	4	–	0
Mississippi College	3	–	0	–	1	5	–	1	–	2
The Citadel	2	–	1	–	1	5	–	3	–	1
Presbyterian	2	–	1	–	1	4	–	3	–	1
Louisville	2	–	1	–	0	5	–	2	–	0
Sewanee	3	–	2	–	0	5	–	4	–	1
Oglethorpe	3	–	3	–	0	4	–	6	–	0
Chattanooga	1	–	3	–	1	3	–	4	–	2
Howard (AL)	1	–	3	–	1	3	–	4	–	3
Wofford	1	–	3	–	0	6	–	3	–	0
Mercer	2	–	2	–	0	4	–	5	–	0
Millsaps	0	–	1	–	1	0	–	1	–	1
Louisiana College	0	–	1	–	0	0	–	1	–	0
Georgetown (KY)	0	–	1	–	0	0	–	3	–	0
Transylvania	0	–	3	–	0	0	–	3	–	0
Newberry	0	–	4	–	0	2	–	8	–	0
$ – Conference champion; * – co-member of SoCon

The 1923 Furman Purple Hurricane football team represented the Furman University as a member of the Southern Intercollegiate Athletic Association (SIAA) during the 1923 college football season. Led by ninth-year head coach Billy Laval, the Purple Hurricane compiled an overall record of 9–2 with a mark of 4–1 in conference play, winning the SIAA title for the second consecutive season. Blackie Carter was the team captain.

== Schedule ==
Date	Opponent	Site	Result	Attendance	Source
September 29	at Virginia*	Lambeth Field; Charlottesville, VA	W 13–10		
October 6	at Mercer	Alumni Field; Macon, GA	L 3–6		
October 13	Presbyterian	Manly Field; Greenville, SC	W 20–0		
October 20	The Citadel	Manly Field; Greenville, SC (rivalry)	W 30–14		
October 24	vs. Davidson*	State Fairgrounds; Columbia, SC	W 30–0		
October 27	at Richmond*	Stadium Field; Richmond, VA	W 22–7		
November 3	Oglethorpe	Manly Field; Greenville, SC	W 29–0		
November 10	South Carolina*	Manly Field; Greenville, SC	W 23–3	3,500	
November 16	Newberry	Manly Field; Greenville, SC	W 35–0		
November 24	Erskine*	Manly Field; Greenville, SC	W 63–0		
November 29	Clemson*	Manly Field; Greenville, SC	L 6–7		
*Non-conference game
