= 1923 The Citadel Bulldogs football team =

American college football season

1923 The Citadel Bulldogs football
- Conference: Southern Intercollegiate Athletic Association
- Record: 5–3–1 (2–1–1 SIAA)
- Head coach: Carl Prause (2nd season)
- Home stadium: College Park Stadium

1923 Southern Intercollegiate Athletic Association football standings
	Conf.					Overall
Team	W		L		T	W		L		T
Furman $	4	–	1	–	0	9	–	2	–	0
Centre	2	–	0	–	0	7	–	1	–	1
Vanderbilt*	2	–	0	–	0	5	–	2	–	1
Western Kentucky	2	–	0	–	0	3	–	4	–	0
Mississippi College	3	–	0	–	1	5	–	1	–	2
The Citadel	2	–	1	–	1	5	–	3	–	1
Presbyterian	2	–	1	–	1	4	–	3	–	1
Louisville	2	–	1	–	0	5	–	2	–	0
Sewanee	3	–	2	–	0	5	–	4	–	1
Oglethorpe	3	–	3	–	0	4	–	6	–	0
Chattanooga	1	–	3	–	1	3	–	4	–	2
Howard (AL)	1	–	3	–	1	3	–	4	–	3
Wofford	1	–	3	–	0	6	–	3	–	0
Mercer	2	–	2	–	0	4	–	5	–	0
Millsaps	0	–	1	–	1	0	–	1	–	1
Louisiana College	0	–	1	–	0	0	–	1	–	0
Georgetown (KY)	0	–	1	–	0	0	–	3	–	0
Transylvania	0	–	3	–	0	0	–	3	–	0
Newberry	0	–	4	–	0	2	–	8	–	0
$ – Conference champion; * – co-member of SoCon

The 1923 The Citadel Bulldogs football team represented The Citadel, The Military College of South Carolina in the 1923 college football season. Carl Prause served as head coach for the second season. The Bulldogs played as members of the Southern Intercollegiate Athletic Association and played home games at College Park Stadium in Hampton Park.

== Schedule ==
Date	Opponent	Site	Result	Source
September 29	Fort Bragg*	College Park Stadium; Charleston, SC	W 31–0	
October 6	Erskine	College Park Stadium; Charleston, SC	W 26–0	
October 13	at Davidson*	Richardson Field; Davidson, NC	L 0–7	
October 20	at Furman	Manly Field; Greenville, SC (rivalry)	L 14–30	
October 27	at Presbyterian	Clinton, SC	T 0–0	
November 3	Newberry	College Park Stadium; Charleston, SC	W 21–7	
November 15	vs. South Carolina*	County Fairgrounds; Orangeburg, SC	L 0–12	
November 23	Southern College (FL)*	College Park Stadium; Charleston, SC	W 18–3	
November 29	at Wofford	Snyder Field; Spartanburg, SC (rivalry)	W 9–0	
*Non-conference game
