= 1923 Centre Praying Colonels football team =

American college football season

1923 Centre Praying Colonels football
- Conference: Southern Intercollegiate Athletic Association
- Record: 7–1–1 (2–0 SIAA)
- Head coach: Charley Moran (7th season)
- Offensive scheme: Single-wing
- Captain: Ed Kubale
- Home stadium: Cheek Field

Uniform
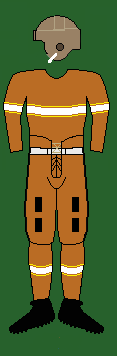

1923 Southern Intercollegiate Athletic Association football standings
| | Conf. | | | | | Overall |
| Team | W | | L | | T | W | | L | | T |
|---|---|---|---|---|---|---|---|---|---|---|
| Furman $ | 4 | – | 1 | – | 0 | 9 | – | 2 | – | 0 |
| Centre | 2 | – | 0 | – | 0 | 7 | – | 1 | – | 1 |
| Vanderbilt* | 2 | – | 0 | – | 0 | 5 | – | 2 | – | 1 |
| Western Kentucky | 2 | – | 0 | – | 0 | 3 | – | 4 | – | 0 |
| Mississippi College | 3 | – | 0 | – | 1 | 5 | – | 1 | – | 2 |
| The Citadel | 2 | – | 1 | – | 1 | 5 | – | 3 | – | 1 |
| Presbyterian | 2 | – | 1 | – | 1 | 4 | – | 3 | – | 1 |
| Louisville | 2 | – | 1 | – | 0 | 5 | – | 2 | – | 0 |
| Sewanee | 3 | – | 2 | – | 0 | 5 | – | 4 | – | 1 |
| Oglethorpe | 3 | – | 3 | – | 0 | 4 | – | 6 | – | 0 |
| Chattanooga | 1 | – | 3 | – | 1 | 3 | – | 4 | – | 2 |
| Howard (AL) | 1 | – | 3 | – | 1 | 3 | – | 4 | – | 3 |
| Wofford | 1 | – | 3 | – | 0 | 6 | – | 3 | – | 0 |
| Mercer | 2 | – | 2 | – | 0 | 4 | – | 5 | – | 0 |
| Millsaps | 0 | – | 1 | – | 1 | 0 | – | 1 | – | 1 |
| Louisiana College | 0 | – | 1 | – | 0 | 0 | – | 1 | – | 0 |
| Georgetown (KY) | 0 | – | 1 | – | 0 | 0 | – | 3 | – | 0 |
| Transylvania | 0 | – | 3 | – | 0 | 0 | – | 3 | – | 0 |
| Newberry | 0 | – | 4 | – | 0 | 2 | – | 8 | – | 0 |
$ – Conference champion; * – co-member of SoCon

The 1923 Centre Praying Colonels football team represented Centre College as a member of the Southern Intercollegiate Athletic Association (SIAA) during the 1923 college football season. Led by Charley Moran in his seventh and final season as head coach, the Praying Colonels compiled an overall record of 7–1–1 with a mark of 2–0 in SIAA play. They scored 140 points while allowing 40 points. The team played home games at the newly opened stadium at Cheek Field in Danville, Kentucky.

== Schedule ==
| Date | Time | Opponent | Site | Result | Attendance | Source |
|---|---|---|---|---|---|---|
| October 6 | | Carson–Newman* | Cheek Field; Danville, KY | W 14–0 | | |
| October 13 | 2:30 p.m. | Clemson* | Cheek Field; Danville, KY | W 28–7 | | |
| October 20 | | Oglethorpe | Cheek Field; Danville, KY | W 29–0 | | |
| October 27 | | at Penn* | Franklin Field; Philadelphia, PA | L 0–24 | 40,000 | |
| November 3 | | Kentucky* | Cheek Field; Danville, KY (rivalry) | W 10–0 | 12,000 | |
| November 10 | | at Sewanee | Russwood Park; Memphis, TN | W 20–6 | 10,000 | |
| November 17 | | at Auburn* | Rickwood Field; Birmingham, AL | W 17–0 | | |
| November 24 | | vs. Washington and Lee* | Parkway Field; Louisville, KY | W 19–0 | 12,000 | |
| December 1 | | at Georgia* | Sanford Field; Athens, GA | T 3–3 | | |
*Non-conference game; All times are in Central time
