= 1923 Mercer Baptists football team =

American college football season

1923 Mercer Baptists football
- Conference: Southern Intercollegiate Athletic Association
- Record: 4–5 (2–2 SIAA)
- Head coach: Stanley L. Robinson (1st season)
- Home stadium: Alumni Field

1923 Southern Intercollegiate Athletic Association football standings
	Conf.					Overall
Team	W		L		T	W		L		T
Furman $	4	–	1	–	0	9	–	2	–	0
Centre	2	–	0	–	0	7	–	1	–	1
Vanderbilt*	2	–	0	–	0	5	–	2	–	1
Western Kentucky	2	–	0	–	0	3	–	4	–	0
Mississippi College	3	–	0	–	1	5	–	1	–	2
The Citadel	2	–	1	–	1	5	–	3	–	1
Presbyterian	2	–	1	–	1	4	–	3	–	1
Louisville	2	–	1	–	0	5	–	2	–	0
Sewanee	3	–	2	–	0	5	–	4	–	1
Oglethorpe	3	–	3	–	0	4	–	6	–	0
Chattanooga	1	–	3	–	1	3	–	4	–	2
Howard (AL)	1	–	3	–	1	3	–	4	–	3
Wofford	1	–	3	–	0	6	–	3	–	0
Mercer	2	–	2	–	0	4	–	5	–	0
Millsaps	0	–	1	–	1	0	–	1	–	1
Louisiana College	0	–	1	–	0	0	–	1	–	0
Georgetown (KY)	0	–	1	–	0	0	–	3	–	0
Transylvania	0	–	3	–	0	0	–	3	–	0
Newberry	0	–	4	–	0	2	–	8	–	0
$ – Conference champion; * – co-member of SoCon

The 1923 Mercer Baptists football team was an American football team that represented Mercer University as a member of the Southern Intercollegiate Athletic Association (SIAA) during the 1923 college football season. In their first year under head coach Stanley L. Robinson, the team compiled a 4–5 record. Robinson was hired from Mississippi College in March 1923 to replace Josh Cody who resigned to become an assistant coach at Vanderbilt.

== Schedule ==
Date	Opponent	Site	Result	Attendance	Source
September 29	at Georgia*	Sanford Field; Athens, GA	L 0–7		
October 6	Furman	Alumni Field; Macon, GA	W 6–3		
October 13	Camp Benning*	Alumni Field; Macon, GA	W 7–0		
October 20	Chattanooga	Alumni Field; Macon, GA	W 18–3		
October 26	Birmingham–Southern*	Alumni Field; Macon, GA	W 12–0		
November 3	at Florida*	Fleming Field; Gainesville, FL	L 7–19	5,000	
November 10	at Oglethorpe	Grant Field; Atlanta, GA	L 6–7		
November 17	at Mississippi College	Provine Field; Clinton, MS	L 0–15		
November 24	Carson–Newman*	Alumni Field; Macon, GA	L 0–12		
*Non-conference game
