= Stanley L. Robinson =

American football player and coach (1890–1967)

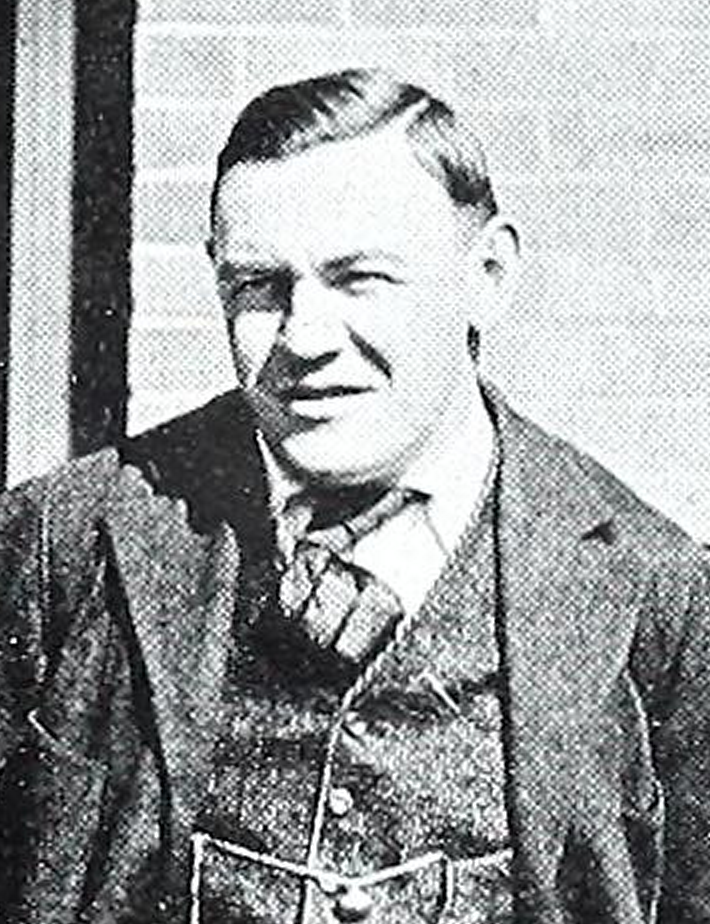
- Robinson pictured in Reveille 1918, Mississippi State yearbook

Biographical details
- Born: November 17, 1890; Michigan, U.S.
- Died: July 2, 1967 (aged 76); Clinton, Mississippi, U.S.

Playing career
- 1911–1914: Colgate
- Position: Back

Coaching career (HC unless noted)

Football
- 1915: Vermont
- 1917–1919: Mississippi A&M
- 1920–1922: Mississippi College
- 1923–1925: Mercer
- 1928–1953: Mississippi College

Baseball
- 1918: Mississippi A&M

Administrative career (AD unless noted)
- 1923–1926: Mercer
- 1928–1961: Mississippi College

Head coaching record
- Overall: 148–88–16 (football); 11–7 (baseball)

Accomplishments and honors

Championships
- Football; 1 Dixie (1940)

Stanley Lewis "Robbie" Robinson (November 17, 1890 – July 2, 1967) was an American college football player and coach. He served as the head football coach the University of Vermont in 1915, Mississippi A&M (now known as Mississippi State University) from 1917 through the 1919, Mercer University from 1923 to 1925, and Mississippi College from 1920 to 1922 and again from 1928 to 1953, compiling a career college football coaching record of 148–88–16. During his three-season tenure at Mississippi A&M, Robinson compiled an overall record of sixteen wins and five losses (16–5). He also spent one season (1919) as the Mississippi A&M baseball coach. Robinson-Hale Stadium at Mississippi College is named in Robinson's honor.

Robinson died on July 2, 1967, at his home in Clinton, Mississippi.

== Head coaching record ==
=== Football ===
Year	Team	Overall	Conference	Standing	Bowl/playoffs
Vermont Green and Gold (Independent) (1915)
1915	Vermont	1–4–2			
Vermont:		1–4–2			
Mississippi A&M Aggies (Southern Intercollegiate Athletic Association) (1917–1919)
1917	Mississippi A&M	6–1	3–1	4th	
1918	Mississippi A&M	3–2	2–0	3rd	
1919	Mississippi A&M	6–2	5–2	5th	
Mississippi A&M:		15–5	10–3		
Mississippi College Collegians/Choctaws (Southern Intercollegiate Athletic Association) (1920–1923)
1920	Mississippi College	3–5	1–4	16th	
1921	Mississippi College	7–2–1	3–1–1	6th	
1922	Mississippi College	6–3	2–0	T–2nd	
Mercer Bears (Southern Intercollegiate Athletic Association) (1923–1925)
1923	Mercer	4–5	2–2	14th	
1924	Mercer	5–3–2	4–1–1	5th	
1925	Mercer	3–6	3–2	T–9th	
Mercer:		12–14–2			
Mississippi College Choctaws (Southern Intercollegiate Athletic Association) (1928–1930)
1928	Mississippi College	7–1–2	6–1–2	2nd	
1929	Mississippi College	3–6–1	1–4–1	27th	
1930	Mississippi College	7–2	4–1	T–7th	
Mississippi College Choctaws (Dixie Conference / Southern Intercollegiate Athletic Association) (1931–1941)
1931	Mississippi College	5–4	1–1 / 4–3	T–4th / T–12th	
1932	Mississippi College	4–4	2–1 / 4–1	T–3rd / T–7th	
1933	Mississippi College	3–4–1	1–1–1 / 2–3	T–5th / T–17th	
1934	Mississippi College	5–4	2–2 / 4–2	T–4th / T–11th	
1935	Mississippi College	2–6–1	1–4–1	9th	
1936	Mississippi College	5–3–1	2–2	T–5th	
1937	Mississippi College	3–6–1	2–1–1	4th	
1938	Mississippi College	7–2	4–1	2nd	
1939	Mississippi College	6–1–1	3–1–1	3rd	
1940	Mississippi College	5–1–1	3–0–1	T–1st	
1941	Mississippi College	5–3	3–1	3rd	
Mississippi College Choctaws (Independent) (1946–1947)
1946	Mississippi College	7–2			
1947	Mississippi College	5–2–1			
Mississippi College Choctaws (Dixie Conference) (1948–1953)
1948	Mississippi College	4–5	2–1	2nd	
1949	Mississippi College	4–5	2–2	T–3rd	
1950	Mississippi College	6–2			
1951	Mississippi College	1–6			
1952	Mississippi College	5–3			
1953	Mississippi College	5–2–1			
Mississippi College:		120–65–12			
Total:		148–88–16			
National championship Conference title Conference division title or championship game berth

^^Mississippi College did not field teams from 1942 to 1945 due to World War II

=== Baseball ===
Record table
Season	Team	Overall	Conference	Standing	Postseason
Mississippi A&M Aggies (Southern Intercollegiate Athletic Association) (1919)
1919	Mississippi A&M	11–7			
Mississippi A&M:		11–7			
Total:		11–7			
