= Farris Stadium =

Multi-purpose stadium in Danville, Kentucky, United States

Andy Frye Stadium
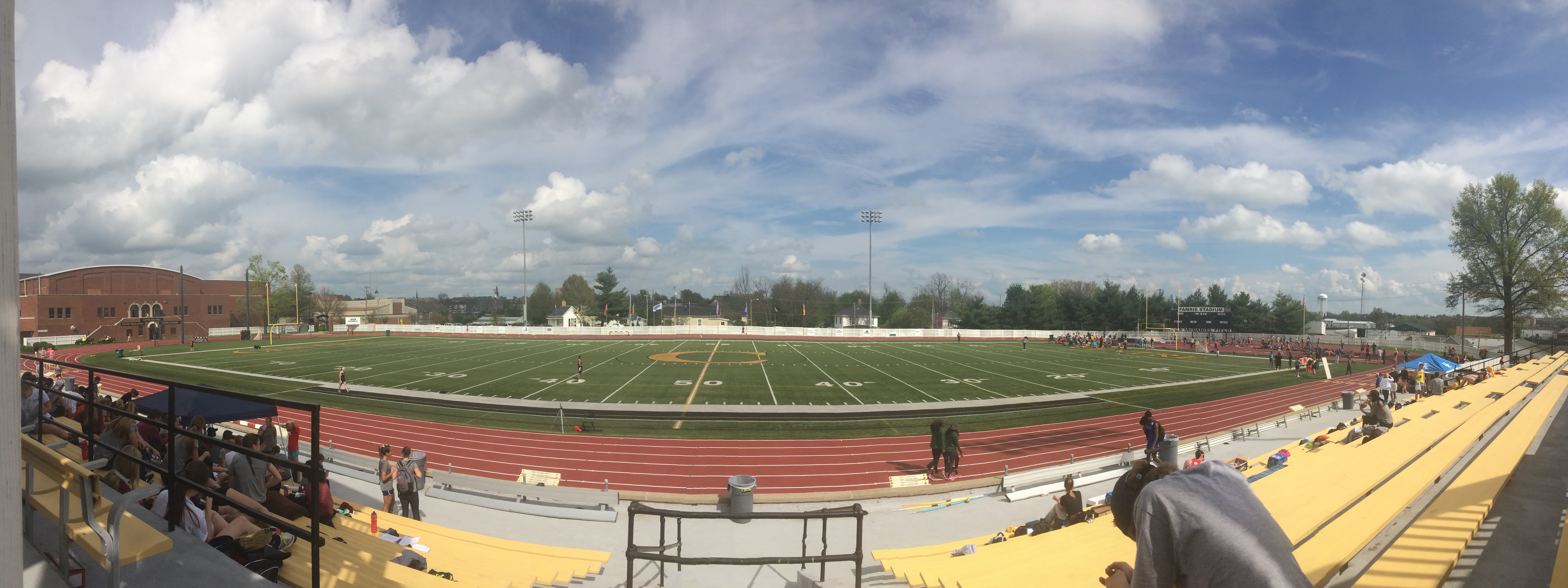
- View of the stadium in 2015
- Interactive map of Andy Frye Stadium
- Address: Danville, KY; United States
- Coordinates: 37.642755°N 84.779751°W
- Owner: Centre College
- Operator: Centre College Athletics
- Type: Stadium
- Surface: Artificial turf
- Current use: Football; Field hockey Lacrosse; Track and field

Construction
- Opened: November 3, 1923
- Demolished: 2022; 4 years ago

Tenants
- Centre Colonels (NCAA) teams: football, field hockey, lacrosse, track and field

Joe McDaniel Field at Farris Stadium was a stadium in Danville, Kentucky, located on the campus of the Centre College. It was the home of the Centre Colonels Centre Colonels football, field hockey, lacrosse, and track teams, in addition to various intramural teams.

== History ==
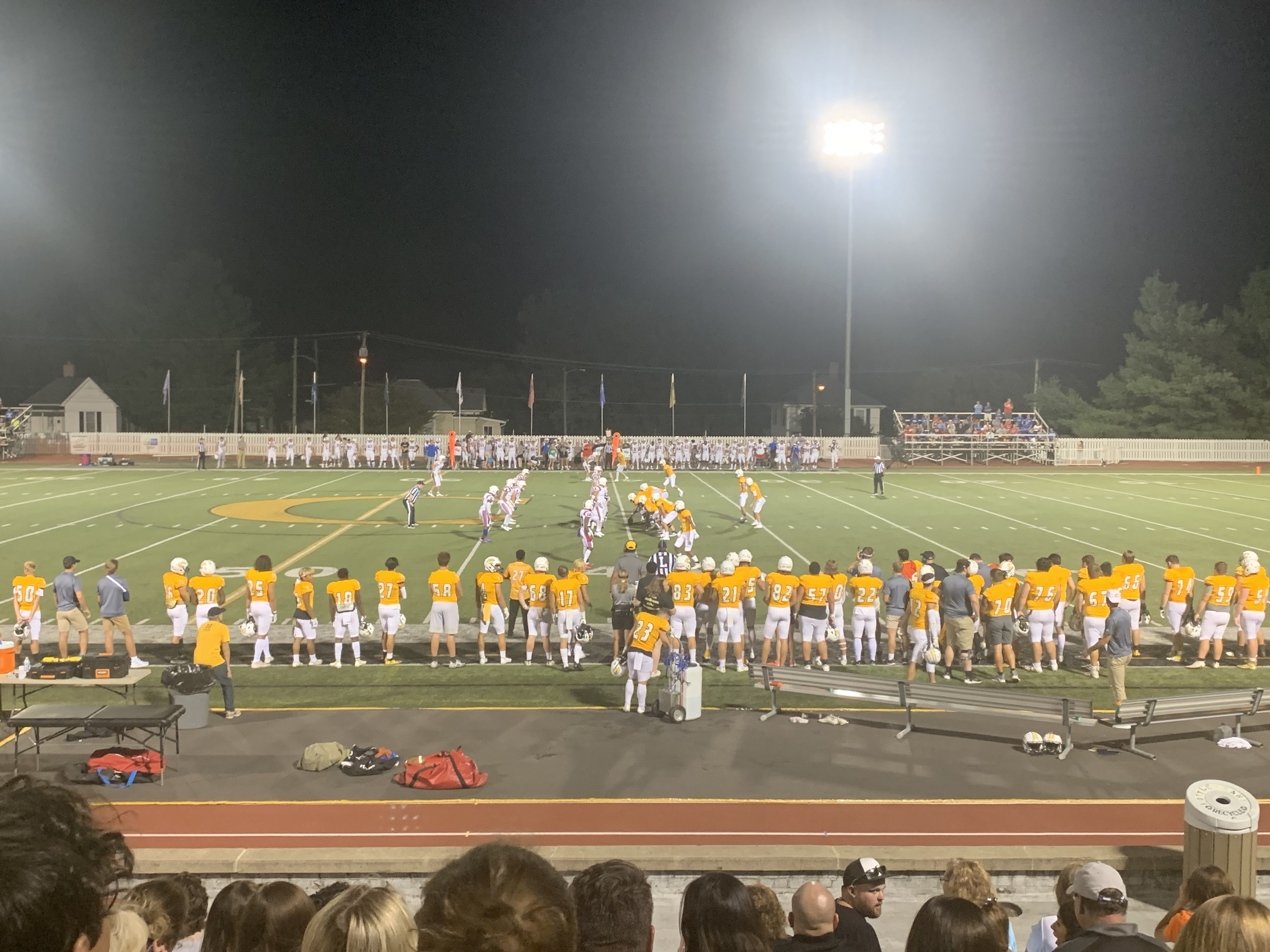
The stadium during a game between Centre and Hanover College, Sep 2021

The stadium was built in 1923. The 1923 Centre Praying Colonels football team opened it season at the new stadium against Carson–Newman on October 6. The stadium was dedicated on November 3 of that year when Centre defeated Kentucky, 10–0, in front of 12,000 fans.

Originally known as Cheek Field, the stadium was renamed in 1934 in honor of Maurice J. Farris III, a 1915 graduate of the college. Upon his death in 1934, he left $25,000 to the college for the improvement of the playing surface and stadium with the provision that the name "Farris Stadium" be adopted.

The field was re-surfaced with synthetic turf in the summer of 2009, though this process was significantly delayed due to poor weather. The stadium was demolished to build Andy Frye Stadium, opened in 2022.
