= Ark Newton =

American football player (1903–1974)

Profile
- Positions: Halfback, Guard (basketball)

Personal information
- Born: January 31, 1903; Camden, Arkansas, U.S.
- Died: January 1974; Nashville, Tennessee, U.S.
- Listed height: 6 ft 1 in (1.85 m)
- Listed weight: 185 lb (84 kg)

Career information
- High school: Camden
- College: Hendrix (1920); Florida (1921–1924)

Awards and highlights
- Southeastern Pentathlon championship; SIAA broad jump record (22' 5"); All-Southern (1922, 1923); University of Florida Athletic Hall of Fame

Robert Dee "Ark" Newton, Jr. (January 31, 1903 – January 1974) was an American college football player for the Florida Gators football team of the University of Florida. Newton was also a member of the Florida Gators baseball, basketball and track teams.

== Early life ==
=== Arkansas ===
Newton was born on January 31, 1903, in Camden, Arkansas, to Robert Dee Newton, Sr. and Cornelia Ellen Newton. His father was a real estate agent.

Newton was called "Ark" by his college teammates because he came from Arkansas; before and after college, he was known as "Bud" to his Arkansas friends. He first starred as an all-state tackle at Camden High School in Camden. While there he worked as a derrick man and driver of an eight-wheeled truck in the oil fields of Arkansas. The first university Newton attended was Hendrix College in Conway, Arkansas. He was a member of the football, baseball, basketball, and track teams, earning a medal as the best all-around athlete at the school.

=== Mississippi ===
Upon leaving Hendrix at the age of 18, Newton worked for the government on the Mississippi River between Vicksburg and Natchez as a foreman of a group of laborers building willow mattresses for use in levee construction. Many of the engineers he worked with had attended the University of Florida, and their praise intrigued Newton enough to come.

== University of Florida ==
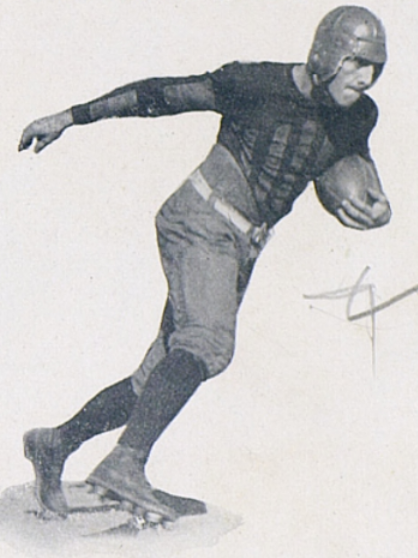
Newton in action.

Newton was an engineering major before changing to law. He won a total of 14 varsity letters at Florida and twice lettered in football, baseball, basketball and track in the same year. At the time he set a Southern Intercollegiate Athletic Association (SIAA) record in the broad jump at 22 feet, 5 inches (also reported as 22 feet, 9 inches). He also once held the Southeastern Pentathlon championship.

=== College football ===
Newton was a prominent halfback for coach William G. Kline and James Van Fleet's Florida Gators football team from 1921 to 1924. "The coming of coach Kline (and heavy pressure from the alumni for a winning football team)" brought players from "the University of Oklahoma and the western states" such as Ferdinand H. Duncan and Newton. Newton allegedly first attended a practice just to watch, and the mere sight of him was so impressive, he was offered a uniform and coaxed onto the field by captain Tootie Perry. Newton's punts sailed over the head of the return men, and brought the attention of the coaches.

I'd have to judge him my best.

— Gators head football coach James Van Fleet, on Ark Newton

Former Tampa Tribune sports editor Pete Norton called Newton "Florida's greatest football player" and "the greatest all-round athlete of the past decade in Florida." Coach Van Fleet said of Newton: "I'd have to judge him my best...He had an unorthodox style, and we tried to change it. That was a mistake. He went back to his own style, and was often a savior to us."

==== 1921 ====
Newton booted a 92-yard punt against Goat Hale led Mississippi College. He made two extra points in a win over Oglethorpe.

==== 1922 ====
Newton

In 1922, Florida suffered a setback early with a 7–6 loss on opening day to Furman due to Newton's missed extra point. The 1922 season featured the Gators first game against a traditional northeastern power as the team traveled to play Harvard. Newton was one of the standouts in the 24–0 loss. In a 58–0 defeat of the Mississippi College Choctaws, the highlight of the game was Newton's run of 72 yards in the second quarter.

One sportswriter claimed Newton threw 13 completions in a row in a 27–6 win at Tulane. "Newton gave the greatest halfback exhibition this season in New Orleans." In a 12–0 victory over Oglethorpe, "Albeit Duncan did the damage...most of the credit for the victory should go to Newton." A description of the football game with Clemson reads "The whistle frequently found Ark Newton, Florida's star on his feet with four or five of the Carolinians clinging around him and the others smothered under the Florida poundage."

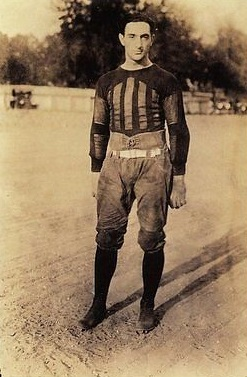
Newton in 1923

The 1922 Spalding's Football Guide ranked Florida as the best forward passing team in the country. Newton was selected for the All-Southern team of Ed Hebert of the Times-Picayune in 1922.

==== 1923 ====
In 1923, Newton got the interception leading to the tying touchdown on Georgia Tech. In a 13–13 tie with Earl Abell's Mississippi A&M Aggies, he had a 96-yard punt, topping his previous record of 92.

Newton was a starter for the 16 to 6 upset victory in the rain over Alabama at a soggy Rickwood Field. His punting, including one of at least 60 yards, along with the running of Edgar C. Jones, got the win. After the game, Van Fleet said "Tom Sebring helped in that game with an idea. Ark needed a little more time (to punt) than most. Sebring proposed we worry only about the kick and not the runback, leaving an extra blocker for Ark. It worked." With multiple votes, Newton was deemed All-Southern. Newton, captain Robbie Robinson and Goldy Goldstein were the first Gators ever to make the composite All-Southern team.

==== 1924 ====
He was elected captain of Florida's 1924 team. Newton caught a pass from Edgar Jones to tie Georgia Tech.

Van Fleet later explained that Texas coach Doc Stewart did not like Florida's former coach William G. Kline, and thus accused Florida of harboring a pro team, demanding verification of ages and accusing Newton of being a professional. Florida scored on an illegal play which went unnoticed, a pass from Edgar Jones to Spec Lightsey, who had lined up at tackle. Texas scored on the last of the first half, after the clock had run out already and officials ruled to give Texas another play.

Newton ran the second-half kickoff back for a 102-yard touchdown against Army at West Point. Of Newton's kick return, Van Fleet said thereby Newton "carved his name in the football hall of fame." Newton had a 25-yard field goal from placement in the victory over Drake.

== Professional football career ==
In 1926 Newton played with the Newark Bears of the American Football League. The team was notable for the number of players from Georgia Tech, but also included two fellow former Gators, linemen Cy Williams and Goldy Goldstein. The Bears are remembered for the team's financially weak ownership group, which led to the folding of the team mid-season.

== Marriage, later life, and honors ==
On June 20, 1926, Newton married one Ora Belle Simmons of Conway, whom he dubbed "the prettiest girl in Arkansas." He later worked as a sheriff in Arkansas, and as a salesman and manager for various companies in the south.

Newton has been inducted into the University of Florida Athletic Hall of Fame as a "Gator Great".

== See also ==
- History of the University of Florida
- List of University of Florida Athletic Hall of Fame members
