= Ferdinand H. Duncan =

American football player (1896–1976)

Florida Gators
- Position: End

Personal information
- Born: June 7, 1896; Sioux City, Iowa, U.S.
- Died: September 8, 1976 (aged 80); Richmond, Virginia, U.S.
- Listed height: 6 ft 2 in (1.88 m)
- Listed weight: 200 lb (91 kg)

Career information
- College: South Dakota (1914–1916); Florida (1921–1922)

Awards and highlights
- All-time Florida team (1935)

Ferdinand Henry "Ferd" "Dunc" Duncan (June 7, 1896 – September 8, 1976) was an American college football player. He was later a traveling salesman.

Duncan played football at the University of South Dakota, where he was captain of the 1916 team. He was a prominent end for the Florida Gators of the University of Florida. Coach William G. Kline brought in players from "the University of Oklahoma and the western states" such as Duncan and Ark Newton upon his arrival. He scored all of Florida's points in one of the programs first big victories, over Alabama in 1921. Coach Stegeman of Georgia wrote in Spalding's Football Guide that year "Florida, for the first time, had a strong team."

Duncan was then captain of the 1922 Florida team, ranked by Spalding's Football Guide as the best forward passing team in the country. It was also the first Florida team to play Harvard. In that game, "Robinson and Duncan stood out all afternoon." He scored all of the points in the win over Oglethorpe. An all-time Florida team selected by George Trevor in 1935 puts Duncan at first team end, opposite Dale Van Sickel. Duncan was also a forward on the basketball team.
