= Eugene McCaslin =

American football player and coach (born 1977)

No. 56
- Position: Linebacker

Personal information
- Born: July 12, 1977 (age 49); Tampa, Florida, U.S.
- Listed height: 6 ft 1 in (1.85 m)
- Listed weight: 226 lb (103 kg)

Career information
- High school: Chamberlain (Tampa)
- College: Florida (1996–1999)
- NFL draft: 2000: 7th round, 249th overall pick

Career history
- Green Bay Packers (2000); Tampa Bay Buccaneers (2001)*; Detroit Lions (2001)*; Tampa Bay Buccaneers (2002)
- * Offseason or practice squad member only

Awards and highlights
- Bowl Alliance national champion (1996)
- Stats at Pro Football Reference

Eugene William McCaslin, Jr. (born July 12, 1977) is an American former professional football player who was a linebacker for a single season in the National Football League (NFL). He played college football for the Florida Gators. He was selected late in the seventh round of the 2000 NFL draft, and played professionally for the NFL's Green Bay Packers. McCaslin was also a member of the Detroit Lions and Tampa Bay Buccaneers but did not appear in any games for either team.

== Early life ==
McCaslin was born in Tampa, Florida. He attended Jesuit High School in Tampa, but later transferred to Chamberlain High School and played high school football for the Chamberlain Chiefs, and won the title of Homecoming King.

== College career ==
McCaslin accepted an athletic scholarship to attend the University of Florida, where he played for coach Steve Spurrier's Florida Gators football team from 1996 to 1999. As a freshman in 1996, he was a member of the Gators team that defeated the Florida State Seminoles 52–20 in the Sugar Bowl to win the Bowl Alliance national championship. Used mostly as a blocking back, he had two games where he rushed for 100 yards or more during the first three seasons of his college career. Prior to his senior season in 1999, he switched to defense and became a starting linebacker.

== Professional career ==
The Green Bay Packers selected McCaslin 249th overall in the seventh round of the 2000 NFL draft. He officially signed with the team on July 10. He was waived on August 27 and signed to the team's practice squad on August 29. McCaslin was promoted to the active roster on December 15 and played in one regular season game for the Packers during the 2000 season. He was waived on July 22, 2001.

McCaslin was signed to the practice squad of the Tampa Bay Buccaneers on November 14, 2001. He was waived on November 23, 2001.

He was signed to the Detroit Lions' practice squad on December 26, 2001. He became a free agent after the season.

McCaslin signed with the Buccaneers on February 4, 2002. He was waived/injured on July 17 and reverted to injured reserve, where he spent the entire 2002 season. He became a free agent after the season but did not sign with another NFL team.

== See also ==
- Florida Gators football, 1990–99
- List of Florida Gators in the NFL draft
