= Carl Perry =

Carl Perry may refer to:

- Tootie Perry (Carl Esmond Perry, 1896–1946), American college football player
- Carl E. Perry, American politician from South Dakota
