= Dennis Lundy =

American football player (born 1972)

No. 40, 43
- Position: Running back

Personal information
- Born: July 6, 1972 (age 54); Tampa, Florida, U.S.
- Listed height: 5 ft 8 in (1.73 m)
- Listed weight: 187 lb (85 kg)

Career information
- High school: Chamberlain (Tampa)
- College: Northwestern (1991–1994)
- NFL draft: 1995: undrafted

Career history
- Houston Oilers (1995); Chicago Bears (1995)

Career NFL statistics
- Receptions: 1
- Receiving yards: 11
- Return yards: 35
- Stats at Pro Football Reference

Dennis Leonard Lundy (born July 6, 1972) is an American former professional football player who was a running back for one season in the National Football League (NFL) with the Houston Oilers and Chicago Bears. He played college football for the Northwestern Wildcats.

== Early life and college ==
Dennis Leonard Lundy was born on July 6, 1972, in Tampa, Florida. He attended George D. Chamberlain High School in Tampa.

Lundy played college football for the Wildcats of Northwestern University from 1991 to 1994. He rushed 142 times for 568 yards and two touchdowns in 1991 while also catching 16 passes for 78 yards. In 1992, he totaled 164 carries for 688 yards and four touchdowns, and 30 receptions for 260 yards. As a junior in 1993, Lundy rushed 170 times for 617 yards and six touchdowns while catching 23 passes for 166 yards and one touchdown. His senior year in 1994, he recorded 260 rushing attempts for a career-high 1,189 yards and eight touchdowns, and 11 receptions for 114 yards.

== Professional career ==
Lundy signed with the Houston Oilers on May 3, 1995, after going undrafted in the 1995 NFL draft. He was released on August 22 but later re-signed on September 6. He was released again on November 21, signed again on November 30, and released again on December 6, 1995. Overall, Lundy played in seven games for the Oilers during the 1995 season, totaling one catch for 11 yards on one target, two kick returns for 28 yards, and one fumble recovery for 18 yards.

Lundy was claimed off waivers by the Chicago Bears on December 76, 1995. He played in two games for the Bears in 1995, returning one kick for 11 yards and one punt for negative four yards while also fumbling once. He was released by the Bears on July 26, 1996.

== Personal life ==
Lundy was sentenced to one month in prison and two years probation on May 5, 1999 for lying to a federal grand jury investigating gambling by Northwestern athletes. Lundy admitted that he gambled on five games, while also deliberately fumbling the ball on the 1-yard line in a 1994 game against Iowa. He testified that the fumble was designed to win a $400 bet that the Wildcats wouldn't cover the point spread.
