= 1965 All-SEC football team =

American college football all-star team

The 1965 All-SEC football team consisted of American football players selected to the All-Southeastern Conference (SEC) chosen by various selectors for the 1965 NCAA University Division football season.

== Offensive selections ==
=== Ends ===
- Charles Casey, Florida (AP-1, UPI)
- Tommy Tolleson, Alabama (AP-1)
- Rick Kestner, Kentucky (UPI)
- Barry Brown, Florida (AP-2)
- Pat Hodgson, Georgia (AP-2)

=== Tackles ===
- Sam Ball, Kentucky (AP-1, UPI)
- Dave McCormick, LSU (AP-1, UPI)
- Jim Harvey, Ole Miss (AP-2)
- Andy Gress, Auburn (AP-2)

=== Guards ===
- Stan Hindman, Ole Miss (AP-1, UPI)
- Larry Beckman, Florida (AP-1, UPI)
- Doug Davis, Kentucky (AP-2)
- Bobby Gratz, Tennessee (AP-2)

=== Centers ===
- Paul Crane, Alabama (AP-1, UPI)
- Forrest Blue, Auburn (AP-2)

=== Quarterbacks ===
- Steve Spurrier, Florida (College Football Hall of Fame) (AP-1, UPI)
- Steve Sloan, Alabama (AP-2)

=== Halfbacks ===
- Steve Bowman, Alabama (AP-1, UPI)
- Rodger Bird, Kentucky (AP-1, UPI)
- Joe Labruzzo, LSU (AP-2)
- Larry Seiple, Kentucky (AP-2)

=== Fullbacks ===
- Mike Dennis, Ole Miss (AP-1, UPI)
- Hoyle Granger, Miss. St. (AP-2)

== Defensive selections ==
=== Ends ===
- Creed Gilmer, Alabama (AP-1, UPI)
- Bobby Frazier, Tennessee (AP-1, UPI)
- Lynn Matthews, Florida (AP-2)
- Lane Wolbe, Vanderbilt (AP-2)

=== Tackles ===
- Jim Urbanek, Ole Miss (AP-1, UPI)
- Jack Thornton, Auburn (AP-1)
- George Rice, LSU (AP-2)
- Dick Lemay, Vanderbilt (AP-2)

=== Middle guards ===
- George Patton, Georgia (AP-1, UPI [as DT])
- Larry Gagner, Florida (UPI)
- Grady Bolton, Miss. St. (AP-2)

=== Linebackers ===
- Frank Emanuel, Tennessee (AP-1, UPI)
- Bill Goss, Tulane (AP-1, UPI)
- Bill Cody, Auburn (AP-1, UPI)
- Tom Fisher, Tennessee (AP-2)
- Mike McGraw, Kentucky (AP-2)
- Tim Bates, Alabama (AP-2)

=== Backs ===
- Bobby Johns, Alabama (AP-1, UPI)
- Lynn Hughes, Georgia (AP-1, UPI)
- Bruce Bennett, Florida (AP-1, UPI)
- Marvin Cornelius, Miss. St. (AP-2)
- Terry Beadles, Kentucky (AP-2)
- Bobby Beaird, Auburn (AP-2)

== Key ==
AP = Associated Press

UPI = United Press International

Bold = Consensus first-team selection by both AP and UPI

== See also ==
- 1965 College Football All-America Team
