= Charles Casey (American football) =

American football player (born 1944)

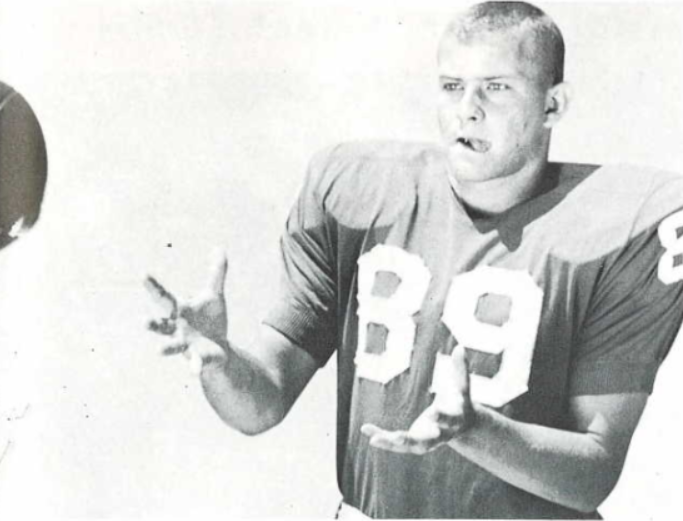
- Casey in 1965 Seminole yearbook

No. 89
- Position: End

Personal information
- Born: February 1, 1944; Atlanta, Georgia, U.S.

Career information
- High school: Brown (Atlanta)
- College: Florida (1963–1965)

Awards and highlights
- First-team All-American (1965); Second-team All-American (1964); 2× First-team All-SEC (1964, 1965); University of Florida Athletic Hall of Fame

Charles A. Casey (born February 1, 1944) is an American former football player. He played at the end position at the University of Florida. He was selected as a first-team All-American in 1965 and set Florida single-season records for receptions (58), receiving yards (809), and receiving touchdowns (8). At the end of his collegiate career, he was the leading receiver in Southeastern Conference (SEC) history with career totals of 114 receptions and 1,612 receiving yards.

== Early life ==
Casey grew up in Atlanta, Georgia. He attended Brown High School where he was a star athlete in baseball, basketball and football. He was offered a $10,000 signing bonus to play baseball by the Milwaukee Braves and scholarships to play basketball by Navy, Louisville and other schools. Pepper Rodgers, who also attended Atlanta's Brown High, recruited Casey to play football at the University of Florida where Rodgers was an assistant coach.

== University of Florida ==
Casey enrolled at the University of Florida and played at the end position for head coach Ray Graves' Florida Gators football teams from 1963 to 1965. After catching nine passes as a sophomore in 1963, Casey gained notice during a March 1964 scrimmage when he caught six passes. During the 1964 season, and despite being routinely double-teamed, Casey was the SEC's leading receiver, and he broke Florida's single-season records with 47 receptions and 673 receiving yards.

As a senior in 1965, Casey broke his own single-season receiving records. In his second season teaming up with Florida quarterback Steve Spurrier, Casey was again the leading receiver in the SEC with 58 receptions for 809 yards and eight touchdowns. He ended his college career as the leading receiver in SEC history. After the 1965 season, he was selected as a first-team All-American offensive end by the American Football Coaches Association (AFCA) and the Associated Press (AP). He also was selected to play in the Senior Bowl, and received the Daytona Beach Quarterback Club's award as the outstanding senior college football player in the State of Florida. Casey received 13 of 17 first-place votes for the award. The Gators coaching staff named him as the recipient of the team's Fergie Ferguson Award, as the "senior football player who displays outstanding leadership, character and courage."

== Later life ==
Casey was selected by the Atlanta Falcons in the sixth round (81st overall pick) of the 1966 NFL draft. He signed a two-year contract for approximately $125,000, but he was released by the Falcons in August 1966 without appearing in any regular season NFL games.

Casey was inducted into the University of Florida Athletic Hall of Fame as a "Gator Great".

== See also ==
- 1965 College Football All-America Team
- List of Florida Gators football All-Americans
- List of University of Florida Athletic Hall of Fame members
