= Larry Seiple =

American football player and coach (born 1945)

No. 20
- Positions: Punter, Halfback, Tight end

Personal information
- Born: February 14, 1945 (age 81); Allentown, Pennsylvania, U.S.
- Listed height: 6 ft 0 in (1.83 m)
- Listed weight: 214 lb (97 kg)

Career information
- High school: William Allen (Allentown)
- College: Kentucky
- NFL draft: 1967: 7th round, 163rd overall pick

Career history
- Miami Dolphins (1967-1977)

Awards and highlights
- 2× Super Bowl champion (VII, VIII); Second-team All-SEC (1965); Inducted into KY Pro Football HOF (2014)

Career NFL/AFL statistics
- Receptions: 73
- Receiving yards: 934
- Receiving touchdowns: 7
- Punts: 633
- Punting yards: 25,347
- Longest punt: 73
- Stats at Pro Football Reference

Larry Robert Seiple (born February 14, 1945) is an American former professional football player and coach. He played college football for the Kentucky Wildcats. He played professionally as a punter for the Miami Dolphins of the American Football League (AFL) from 1967 through 1969, and the NFL's Dolphins from 1970 through 1977. He was selected by the Dolphins in the seventh round of the 1967 NFL draft.

With the Dolphins, Seiple was a part of two Super Bowl-winning teams, Super Bowl VII in 1972, when the Dolphins posted the only undefeated regular and post-season record to date in NFL history, and in Super Bowl VIII in 1973.

== Early life and education ==
Seiple was born in Allentown, Pennsylvania, where he played football for William Allen High School.

He played collegiate football at the University of Kentucky, where he was a wide receiver and running back for the Wildcats, and also handled punts, kickoffs, and kickoff returns for the team. He was a second-team All-Southeastern Conference selection in his junior season, averaging 4.3 yards per carry while also scoring nine touchdowns and gaining 1,081 yards of offense. In three seasons, Seiple gained 2,137 yards from scrimmage and scored 18 touchdowns, and set school records for average yards per catch, both in a season (23.5 in 1965) and in a career (19.8). He had four receptions of at least 70 yards, and once converted a 4th and 41 with a 70 yard touchdown on a fake punt.

== Career ==
=== National Football League ===
Seiple entered the 1967 NFL/AFL draft and was selected by the Miami Dolphins in the seventh round with the 163rd overall selection. Unlike most punters, Seiple also caught and carried the ball on occasion for the Dolphins. His most prolific year was 1969 when he netted 577 yards and scored five touchdowns, leading the Dolphins in both categories that year. Seiple was often able to rush for yards instead of punting. That type of risk paid dividends for the Dolphins in a 1972 playoff game against the Pittsburgh Steelers in which he ran for a 37-yard gain, keeping a drive alive. Miami would go on to win that game and the Super Bowl that year, completing a perfect season of 17–0, the only perfect season by an NFL team in the league's history.

=== Coaching career ===
Seiple was offensive coordinator for Florida Atlantic University in Boca Raton, Florida under then head coach Howard Schnellenberger, who also played college football at the University of Kentucky.

Seiple was the assistant coach for quarterbacks for the Miami Dolphins from 1998 to 1999 and their assistant coach for wide receivers from 1988 to 1997. From 1985 to 1986, he was assistant coach for wide receivers for the Tampa Bay Buccaneers and for the Detroit Lions from 1980 to 1984.

== Awards ==
In June 2014, the University of Kentucky announced that Seiple would be inducted into the Kentucky Pro Football Hall of Fame.
