= Lynn Matthews =

American football player (born 1944)

No. 84 – Florida Gators
- Position: Defensive end
- Class: Graduate (B.A. 1966)

Personal information
- Born: 1944 (age 81–82); Tampa, Florida, U.S.
- Listed height: 6 ft 2 in (1.88 m)
- Listed weight: 214 lb (97 kg)

Career information
- High school: Chamberlain High School
- College: Florida (1963–1965)

Awards and highlights
- First-team All-American (1965); 2× Second-team All-SEC (1964, 1965); University of Florida Athletic Hall of Fame

Lynn Otto Matthews (born 1944) is an American former college football player who was recognized as an All-American. Matthews later became a newspaper publishing executive.

== Early life ==
Matthews was born in Tampa, Florida. He attended Chamberlain High School in Tampa, and he played high school football as Captain for the Chamberlain Chiefs, earning a spot on the All-City, All-Conference, and All-State Football Teams.

== All-American college football career ==
Matthews accepted an athletic scholarship to attend the University of Florida in Gainesville, Florida, where he played defensive end for coach Ray Graves' Florida Gators football team from 1963 to 1965. he initially played both ways, at tight end and defensive end, but played defense exclusively after his sophomore year. He was a three-year letterman and was the defensive hero for the Gators in a 14–0 win over the Auburn Tigers in 1964. He was selected as a second-team All-Southeastern Conference (SEC) selection in 1964 and 1965, and a first-team All-American in 1965. He was known as a big-play maker and is regarded as one of the finest defensive ends for the Gators, and helped lead the Gators to their first New Year's Day bowl game, the 1966 Sugar Bowl. Matthews graduated from the university with a bachelor's degree in 1966, and was later inducted into the University of Florida Athletic Hall of Fame as a "Gator Great." In 1999, he was chosen as a second-team selection to the University of Florida's All-Century Team, and the Gators' All-Time Team in 1983.

== Newspaper publisher ==
At different times during his career, Matthews served as the publisher of the Ocala Star-Banner (Ocala, Florida), The Ledger (Lakeland, Florida), The Press Democrat (Santa Rosa, California) and the Sarasota Herald-Tribune (Sarasota, Florida). In 1999, he was promoted to be the president and chief operating officer of the Times Regional Newspaper Group, then consisting of twenty-one Times newspapers located mostly in the southeastern United States, including the Herald-Tribune and The Ledger. Matthews retired from the Times Regional Newspaper Group at the end of 2002, after nearly thirty years with the company.

== See also ==
- 1965 College Football All-America Team
- Florida Gators
- Florida Gators football, 1960–69
- List of Florida Gators football All-Americans
- List of University of Florida alumni
- List of University of Florida Athletic Hall of Fame members
