= George D. Chamberlain High School =

Public high school in Florida, United States

Location
- 9401 North Boulevard; Tampa, (Hillsborough County), Florida 33612; United States; 28°02′05″N 82°28′01″W

Information
- Type: Public secondary school
- Established: 1956; 70 years ago
- School district: Hillsborough County Public Schools
- Principal: Jake Russell
- Teaching staff: 64.50 (FTE)
- Grades: 9–12
- Enrollment: 1,262 (2022–2023)
- Student to teacher ratio: 19.57
- Campus: Urban
- Colors: Green and gold
- Team name: Storm (formerly Chiefs 1956-2020)
- Newspaper: The Chieftain
- Yearbook: The Totem
- Website: www.hillsboroughschools.org/o/chamberlain

George D. Chamberlain High School is a public high school in Tampa, Florida, United States. It was opened in 1956 on North Boulevard (on the corner of Busch Boulevard). The school is named in honor of George D. Chamberlain, who served for several years as a trustee for the Hillsborough County School System.

== Demographics ==
In the 2022–2023 academic year, the student population numbered 1,243. The ethnic makeup was as follows:

- 50.93% Hispanic
- 30.01% Black
- 12.15% White
- 4.67% Multi-racial
- 2.25% Asian

== Athletics ==
Chamberlain is a member of the Florida High School Athletic Association and competes as the Storm in these sports:

- Boys: baseball, (Note: The school lists these varsity sports, but the FHSAA does not.) basketball, cross country, football, golf, soccer, swimming, wrestling
- Girls: basketball, cheerleading, cross country, flag football, golf, soccer, softball, swimming, volleyball, wrestling

Florida state championships

- Golf (Boys): 1959
- Golf (Girls): 1999 Spring, 1999 Fall, 2000
- Softball: 2003, 2012

== Notable alumni ==
- Dennis Aust, MLB pitcher.
- Forrest Blue, NFL offensive lineman.
- Brodrick Bunkley, NFL nose tackle.
- Bob Burns, NFL running back.
- Ken Hagan (Class of 1985), Hillsborough County Commissioner and Chair of the Hillsborough County Board of County Commissioners
- Jane Castor (Class of 1977), Mayor of Tampa
- Kathy Castor, U.S. Representative, Florida - District 14.
- Brian Clark, NFL wide receiver.
- Joe Clermond, NFL defensive end.
- Elijah Dukes, MLB outfielder.
- Robert Gant, actor and producer.
- Steve Garvey, MLB first baseman.
- Chip Glass, NFL tight end.
- Jay Gruden, Head coach, Washington Redskins.
- Bob Hall (Class of 1960), Republican member of the Texas State Senate
- James Harrell, NFL linebacker.
- Kevin House, Jr., NFL cornerback.
- Oliver Hoyte, NFL linebacker/fullback.
- Lauren Hutton (known then as Mary Hall), model-actress.
- Jimmy Jordan, NFL running back.
- Greg Lee, NFL wide receiver.
- Dentarius Locke, American Track and field sprinter.
- Dennis Lundy, NFL running back.
- Aasif Mandvi, actor
- Lynn Matthews, college football player and newspaper publisher.
- Dean May, NFL quarterback.
- Eugene McCaslin, NFL linebacker.
- Mike Mekelburg, professional soccer midfielder.
- Dave Miley, MLB manager for the Cincinnati Reds.
- Sherrie Rose, actress
- Ron Selesky, NFL player/Arena Football League coach.
- Shock G, rapper.
- Bobby Sprowl, MLB pitcher for Boston Red Sox and Houston Astros
- Liz Vassey, actress.
- Johnny Walker Jr., college football player.
- Tom Walker, MLB pitcher.
