= Tootie Perry =

American football player (1896–1946)

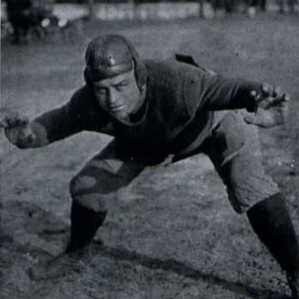
- Perry c. 1921

Profile
- Position: Guard/Center
- Class: Graduate

Personal information
- Born: February 4, 1896; Rochelle, Florida, U.S.
- Died: August 9, 1946 (aged 50); Gainesville, Florida, U.S.
- Listed height: 5 ft 9 in (1.75 m)
- Listed weight: 210 lb (95 kg)

Career information
- High school: Gainesville
- College: Florida (1916; 1919-21)

Awards and highlights
- All-Southern (1921); University of Florida Athletic Hall of Fame

Carl Esmond "Tootie" Perry (February 4, 1896 – August 9, 1946) was an American college football player. He played at the guard position and was the first All-Southern player for the Florida Gators football program of the University of Florida.

== Early life ==
Perry was born in Rochelle, Florida, in 1896. His parents were Thomas Jefferson Perry and Laura Jane (Sparkman) Perry.

== University of Florida ==
Perry twice enrolled in the University of Florida in Gainesville; first in 1916, and again in 1919. He initially played for coach C. J. McCoy's Florida Gators football team in 1916, but returned at age 23 to play for coach William G. Kline's Gators teams from 1919 to 1921. Perry was five feet, ten inches tall, and at his largest weighed 235 pounds while playing at the guard and center position for the Gators. In a 16–0 loss to Georgia in 1919, "through Perry's ability to handle Day, the Georgia star center, Florida outbucked Georgia..."

In 1921, Perry was a first-team All-Southern selection of the Chattanooga News, Columbus Enquirer-Sun and Nashville Banner, becoming the first All-Southern player at Florida, and also the senior team captain on Florida's team. An account of the Mercer game reads "Capt. Tootie Perry was again the star on defense." The 1922 Seminole, the University of Florida yearbook, called Perry the Gators' "jolly captain" and "Dixie's greatest guard" who played every minute of every game for two years and "developed into a wizard at blocking punts."

While attending Florida, Perry worked during the summers shoveling coal as a fireman on locomotives for the Atlantic Coast Line between Jacksonville and Leesburg, Florida. Shortly before Christmas in 1921, and after the football season had ended, he left school to return to his work on the railroad.

== Later life ==
Perry later went into the ice cream and dairy business in Gainesville. He married, and he and his wife, Ethelyn, had two daughters, Mary Ethelyn (born c. 1924) and Elizabeth Carter (born c. 1926).

Perry also remained active with the Florida football program after graduating. In 1925, he moved back to Gainesville and became a fixture on the sidelines at Florida football games, serving as the team's water boy. He gained national media notoriety as the "All-American Waterboy," and he also hosted an annual Homecoming barbecue and Brunswick stew banquet for alumni.

Perry died in 1946 at age 50 in Gainesville and was buried in the local Evergreen Cemetery. In 1949, the University of Florida named a new baseball field "Perry Field" in his honor, built on land donated to the university by his family.

He was posthumously inducted into the University of Florida Athletic Hall of Fame as a "Gator Great" in 1992.

== See also ==
- Florida Gators
- History of Florida Gators football
- List of University of Florida Athletic Hall of Fame members
