= Edgar C. Jones =

American athlete and banker (1903–1980)

Edgar Jones
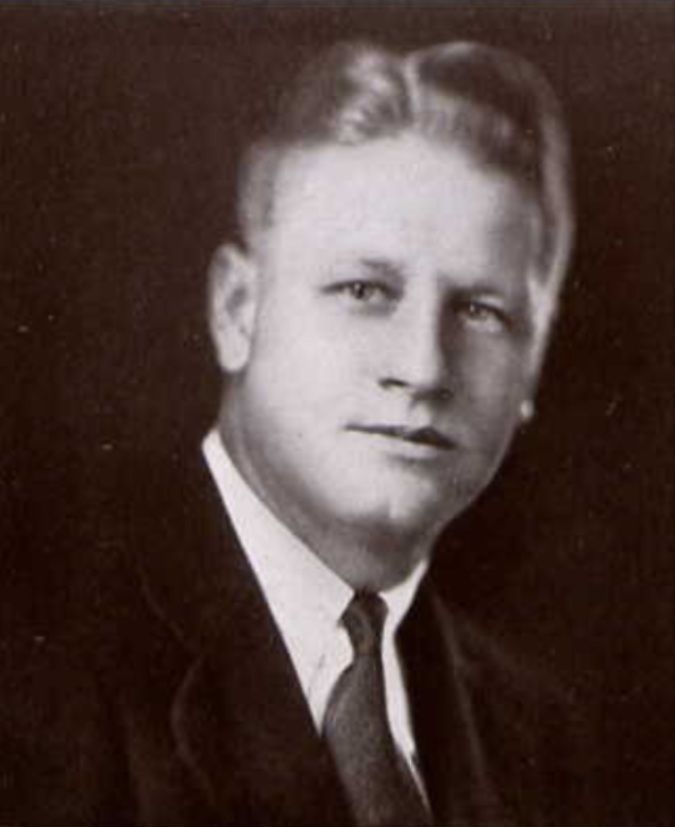
- Jones from 1931 Seminole yearbook

Biographical details
- Born: December 29, 1903; Jacksonville, Florida, U.S.
- Died: October 27, 1980 (aged 76)

Playing career

Football
- 1923–1925: Florida

Basketball
- 1924–1925: Florida
- Position: Halfback/Quarterback (football)

Administrative career (AD unless noted)
- 1930–1936: Florida

Accomplishments and honors

Awards
- 2x All-Southern (1924, 1925); University of Florida Athletic Hall of Fame

Edgar Charles Jones (December 29, 1903 – October 27, 1980) was an American football and basketball player, college athletic director and banker. He played both sports at the University of Florida in the 1920s and set a Florida Gators football single-season scoring record (108 points) that stood for 44 years. He was the university's athletic director from 1930 to 1936. He later served as executive vice president of Miami Federal Savings and Loan.

== Early years ==
Jones was a Florida native who graduated from Duval High School in 1922. While in high school, he was a member of the school's football, basketball, baseball, and track teams. He received varsity letters in football all four years and was an all-state player in his senior year. He lettered in basketball during his junior and senior years and was an all-state player as a senior. As a senior, he was also Duval High School's individual point leader in track. It is also important to note that the 1921 Duval High School football team (graduating class of 1922) was named State and National Champions for the 1921 season.

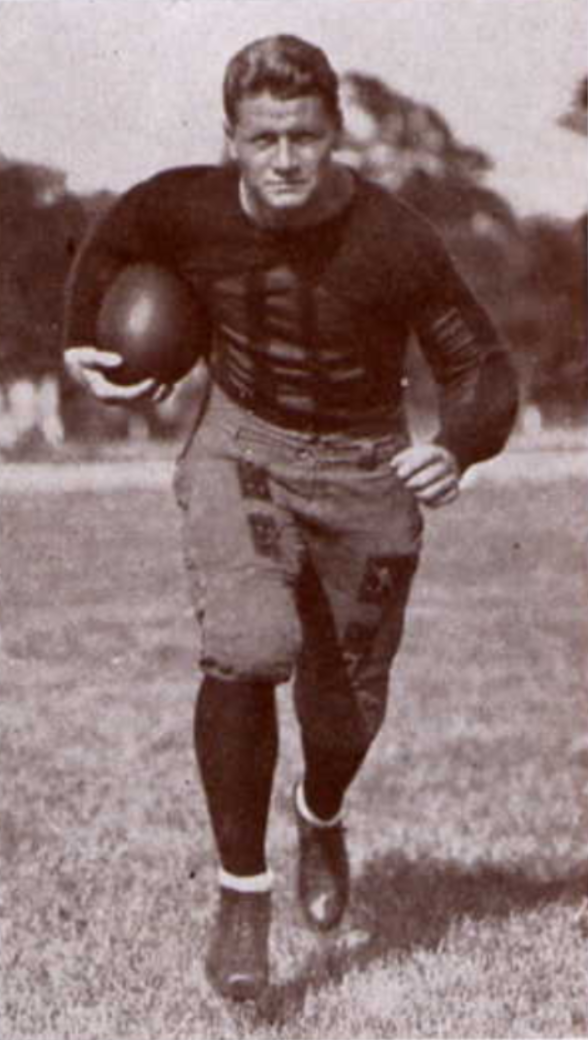
Jones of Florida

== University of Florida ==
After graduating from high school, Jones enrolled at the University of Florida in Gainesville. He played at the halfback position for coach James Van Fleet and coach Tom Sebring's Florida Gators football teams from 1923 to 1925. In his first season on the freshman team, the team won the southern crown for freshmen squads. Memorably, he scored all of the Gators' points in a 16 to 6, second-half comeback victory in the rain over the Alabama Crimson Tide in 1923. The scores came on runs of 10 yards around right end, a 12-yard place kick, and a 20-yard run around right end. During his three seasons on the Gators varsity, the team compiled a win–loss–tie record of 20–5–2, the best three-year stretch in team history. As a senior in 1925, he was the captain of the Gators team that compiled an 8–2 record – the best record in the first twenty seasons of the Gators football team. That year, Jones scored a total of 16 touchdowns – eight rushing, six receiving and two kick returns; his 108 points remained a Gators single-season record for 44 years. The single season scoring record was broken by Tommy Durrance (by 2 points in the final game of an 11 game season), whereas Jones's record of 108 points occurred in only a 10 game season. Jones's single season record from the 1925 season still remains in the top five of Florida players single season records for points scored. After the conclusion of the 1925 season, he was invited to play in the inaugural East–West Shrine Game, the first Gator ever invited to a post-season all-star bowl game.

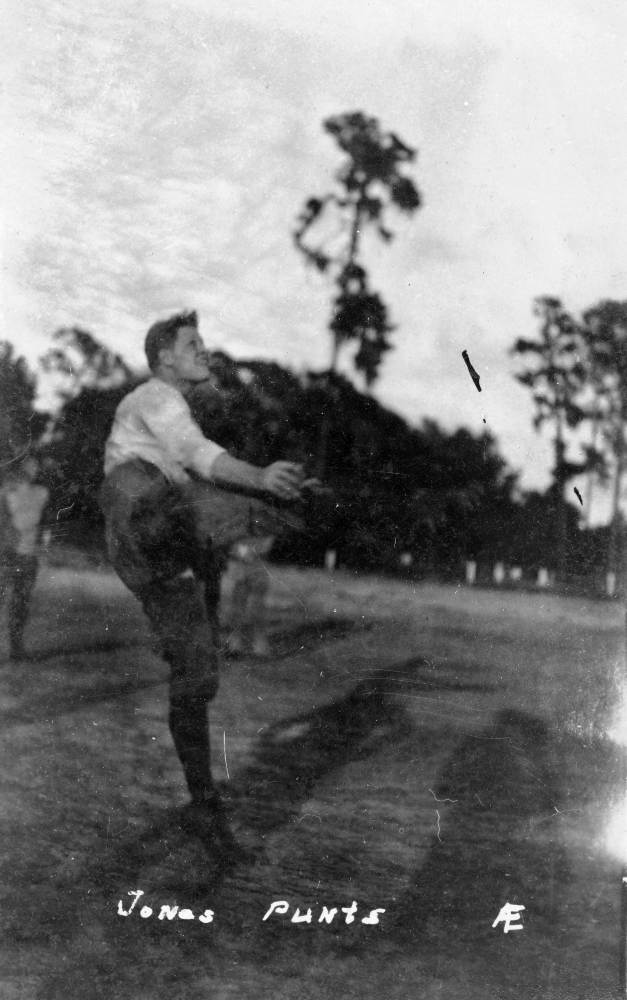
Edgar Jones punting.

Jones also played for coach James White's Florida Gators men's basketball team in 1924 and 1925, and was twice selected as the team captain, after first serving as the team manager for two years. He graduated from the University of Florida with a Bachelor of Laws degree (LL.B.) in 1926, and was later inducted into the University of Florida Athletic Hall of Fame as a "Gator Great."

== Business and athletic administration career ==
After earning his law degree, Jones began practicing law in the law office of Giles Patterson. From 1927 to 1930, Jones was employed by the Atlantic National Bank of Jacksonville as publicity director and statistician.

In June 1930, Jones became the University of Florida's athletic director, a position he held until May 1936. While serving as athletic director, he agreed to reimburse bus fare for sports broadcaster Red Barber to give a 15-minute talks on WJAX before Florida football games. Barber later wrote that his arrangement with Jones was the first "fee" he ever received for broadcasting on a commercial station.

In May 1936, Jones left the University of Florida to accept a position as executive vice president with Miami Federal Savings and Loan. In December 1941 (just after the Japanese attack on Pearl Harbor) Lt. Commander Edgar C. Jones USNR activated his United States Navy Reserves status and was assigned as Commander (Head of United States Naval Law Enforcement) of the United States Navy Shore Patrol unit at the Naval Base in Charleston, SC. In 1948 Jones became General Manager of Claude Nolan Cadillac in Jacksonville, FL and then in June 1951 was promoted to become Vice President and General Manager of the (Claude Nolan) Nolan Brown Cadillac dealership offices in Miami and Miami Beach. He was also active in politics and was a supporter and Campaign Manager for Florida Governor Daniel T. McCarty, and served as a surrogate speaker for McCarty during his initial, unsuccessful campaign for governor in 1948.

== See also ==
- Florida Gators
- History of the University of Florida
- List of Levin College of Law graduates
- List of University of Florida faculty and administrators
- List of University of Florida Athletic Hall of Fame members
