= W. M. Robinson =

American football player (1902–1982)

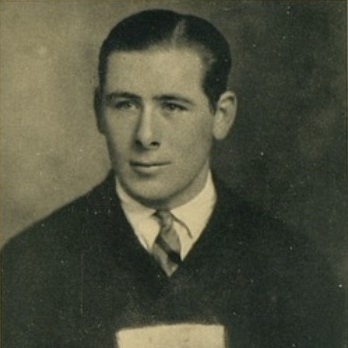
- Robinson c. 1923 "Robbie"

Profile
- Position: Tackle

Personal information
- Born: September 5, 1902; Bessemer, Alabama, U.S.
- Died: July 29, 1982 (aged 79); Evanston, Illinois, U.S.
- Listed height: 6 ft 0 in (1.83 m)
- Listed weight: 180 lb (82 kg)

Career information
- College: Florida (1921–1923)

Awards and highlights
- All-Southern (1923)

Winthrop Marston "Robbie" Robinson (September 5, 1902 – July 29, 1982) was an American college football player and insurance salesman.

== Early life ==
While he played at UF he was said to be from Mobile, Alabama.

== University of Florida ==
Robinson was a prominent tackle for the Florida Gators of the University of Florida from 1921 to 1923.

=== 1922 ===
The first time the Gators ever traveled to the East, Harvard subs overwhelmed Florida 24 to 0 in front of the largest crowd yet to see the Gators play. Despite the loss, Robinson, "who at times stood Harvard's backs on their heads," played well. "Robinson and Duncan stood out all afternoon."

=== 1923 ===
He was the captain of the 1923 team which upset the Alabama Crimson Tide on Thanksgiving Day 16 to 6. On that game he said, "Psychology did the trick and turned the tables on the Crimson, for the word went the rounds on the campus that "they can't do it"'–referring to Alabama's chances of walking on the Florida team. He also remarked on the many goal line stands by Florida. Robinson was selected All-Southern in 1923.

== Professional football ==
On January 16, the Tampa Cardinals' fourth game was a 3–0 win over a Sarasota team of collegians constructed by Robinson. Jim Thorpe provided the only score on a 40-yard drop kick field goal.

== See also ==
- Tampa Cardinals
