= Florida Gators football =

Team representing the University of Florida in American college football

2026 Florida Gators football team
- First season: 1906; 120 years ago
- Athletic director: Scott Stricklin
- General manager: David Caldwell
- Head coach: Jon Sumrall; 1st season, 7–4 (.636)
- Location: Gainesville, Florida
- Stadium: Ben Hill Griffin Stadium (capacity: 88,548)
- Field: Steve Spurrier–Florida Field
- NCAA division: Division I FBS
- Conference: SEC
- Colors: Orange and blue
- All-time record: 778–463–40 (.623)
- Bowl record: 25–24 (.510)

National championships
- Claimed: 1996, 2006, 2008
- Unclaimed: 1984, 1985

National finalist
- Bowl Alliance: 1995, 1996
- BCS: 2006, 2008

Conference championships
- SEC: 1991, 1993, 1994, 1995, 1996, 2000, 2006, 2008

Division championships
- SEC East: 1992, 1993, 1994, 1995, 1996, 1999, 2000, 2003, 2006, 2008, 2009, 2012, 2015, 2016, 2020
- Heisman winners: Steve Spurrier – 1966; Danny Wuerffel – 1996; Tim Tebow – 2007
- Consensus All-Americans: 34 (Note: The NCAA records for "consensus" All-Americans do not reflect the total number of All-American honors received by Gators football players, only those players who received a majority of the various first-team All-American selections at their position in any given season. The Gators' first consensus All-American was quarterback Steve Spurrier in 1966; the thirty-fourth and most recent was offensive guard O'Cyrus Torrence in 2022.)
- Rivalries: Florida State (rivalry); Georgia (rivalry); Auburn (rivalry); Kentucky (rivalry); LSU (rivalry); Tennessee (rivalry); Alabama (rivalry); Miami (rivalry)

Uniforms
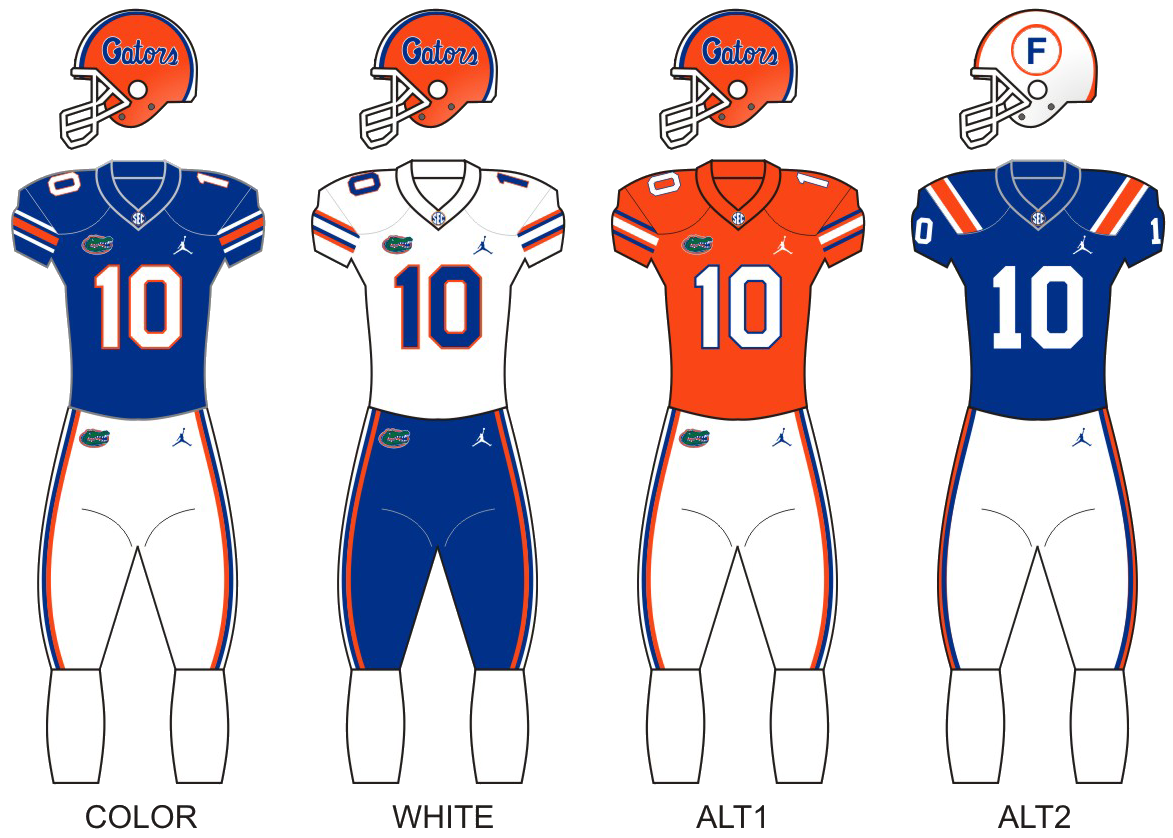
- Fight song: "The Orange and Blue"
- Mascot: Albert and Alberta
- Marching band: Pride of the Sunshine
- Outfitter: Jordan Brand
- Website: FloridaGators.com

The Florida Gators football program represents the University of Florida (UF) in American college football. Florida competes in the Football Bowl Subdivision (FBS) of the National Collegiate Athletic Association (NCAA) and the Southeastern Conference (SEC). They play their home games on Steve Spurrier-Florida Field at Ben Hill Griffin Stadium on the university's Gainesville campus.

Florida's football program was established along with the university in 1906. It took on the "Gators" nickname in 1911, began playing in newly constructed Florida Field in 1930, and joined the Southeastern Conference as a founding member in 1932. On the field, the Gators found intermittent success during the first half of the 20th century, with a highlight being the 1928 squad that went 8–1 and led the nation in scoring. Florida football enjoyed its first sustained success in the 1960s under head coach Ray Graves. After having appeared in only two sanctioned bowl games up to that time, Grave's Gators won four during the decade, and quarterback Steve Spurrier became the school's first Heisman Trophy winner in 1966.

Spurrier returned to his alma mater as the Gators' "head ball coach" in 1990, and the program has been among the top in college football since then. Since 1990, Florida has won three national championships (in 1996 under Spurrier and in 2006 and 2008 under Urban Meyer), eight conference titles, fifteen SEC East division titles, and seventeen bowl games, and Florida squads have finished the season ranked in the top-10 fifteen times. In addition, quarterbacks Danny Wuerffel and Tim Tebow won the Heisman in 1996 and 2007, respectively.

== History ==
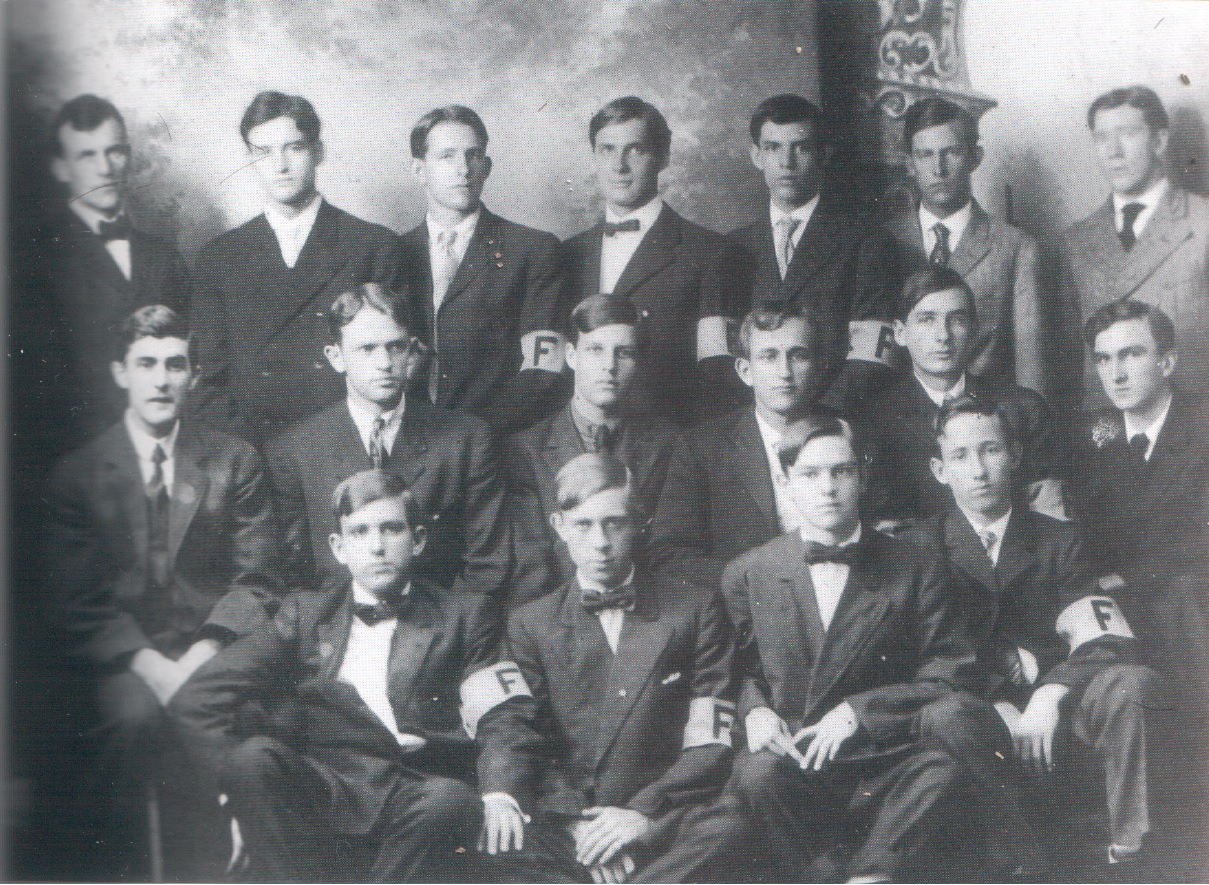
1907 UF football team

The University of Florida was established in Gainesville in 1906 and fielded its first official varsity football team that fall. Since then, Florida Gator football squads have played in over 40 bowl games; won three national championships (1996, 2006 and 2008) and eight Southeastern Conference championships (1991, 1993, 1994, 1995, 1996, 2000, 2006 and 2008) and have produced three Heisman Trophy winners, over 90 first-team All-Americans and 50 National Football League (NFL) first-round draft choices.

Discounting interim coaches, there have been twenty-five head coaches in program history, including three who were inducted into the College Football Hall of Fame for their coaching success. Florida's first head coach was Pee Wee Forsythe, and its current head coach is Jon Sumrall.

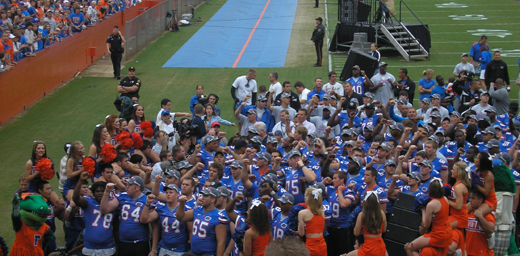
Celebration following the 2009 BCS National Championship Game

=== Conference affiliations ===
Florida competed for its first several seasons as an independent before joining the Southern Intercollegiate Athletic Association in 1912. They moved to the Southern Conference in 1922, then joined with a dozen other schools to establish the Southeastern Conference (SEC) in 1932, where it has remained ever since.

==== Yearly schedule ====
The SEC allowed considerable leeway with regard to conference schedules for several decades after its founding in 1932. Like most members, Florida played a few conference foes every season but would not play other schools for several years at a time until the conference attempted to balance schedules by establishing a rotation of sorts in the late 1960s and formalizing it in 1972.

Schedules were further standardized in 1992 when the SEC expanded to twelve teams, established two divisions, and set eight team conference schedule plus a championship game between the two division winners. Florida was placed in the SEC Eastern Division and played every division foe every season. From 2012 until 2023, the Gators' annual conference slate consisted of Georgia, South Carolina, Tennessee, Kentucky, Missouri and Vanderbilt along with permanent Western Division opponent LSU plus another Western Division team on a rotating schedule.

In 2024, the SEC expanded to 16 schools and abolished divisions, though it temporarily retained the eight-game conference schedule. Beginning in 2026, the league will move to a nine-game conference schedule which will controversially end some annual rivalries, including some involving Florida.

Florida's key conference rivals include Georgia (played in Jacksonville usually around Halloween), Tennessee (historically played in mid-September, although the series was not played annually until 1992), and LSU (usually in early to mid-October, but played in November in 2024 and September in 2025). These contests were played annually for many years, but once the SEC moves to a nine-game conference schedule in 2026, Florida will play LSU and Tennessee every other year.

Florida has played in-state rival Florida State every year since 1958 except for the pandemic-altered 2020 season. The Gators and Seminoles have faced off around Thanksgiving since the 1970s, and their emergence as perennial football powers during the 1990s helped build the Florida–Florida State rivalry into a game that often had national-title implications. In-state rival Miami was once another annual opponent. However, the rivalry was dropped when the SEC expanded its yearly schedule in the late 1980s, and the Florida–Miami rivalry has been renewed on an infrequent basis since then, and will be scheduled even less frequently due to the SEC and ACC each expanding to nine conference games in 2026. The remaining dates on Florida's regular schedule are filled by non-conference opponents which vary from year to year.

=== Home fields ===
The University of Florida's campus did not include sports facilities when it opened in 1906, so UF's first several football and baseball squads played their home games at The Ballpark, a primitive municipal facility near downtown Gainesville. In 1911, the school purchased the bleachers from the city and moved them to University Athletic Field, a newly cleared patch of land on the west side of campus along University Avenue. Larger bleachers were installed in 1915, when the facility was renamed Fleming Field.

The football program first gained national recognition in the late 1920s, prompting UF president John J. Tigert to initiate plans for a modern stadium. A shallow ravine just south of Fleming Field was the chosen site, and 20,000 seat Florida Field opened in 1930. The facility underwent major expansions in the mid-1960s, early 1980s, and early 1990s to increase stadium capacity to about 90,000, the largest in the state. Its name was extended to "Florida Field at Ben Hill Griffin Stadium" in 1989 to honor UF benefactor Ben Hill Griffin, and the field was rechristened "Steve Spurrier-Florida Field" in 2016 to honor Gator player and coach Steve Spurrier. Spurrier also coined the stadium's nickname of "The Swamp" in 1992, early in his tenure as head football coach.

== Conference affiliations ==
Florida has been a member of the Southeastern Conference since its founding in 1932.

Florida's football program is a charter member of the Southeastern Conference, which began play in 1933. Before that, the Gators were affiliated with two different conferences after having founded the program without a conference affiliation.

- Independent (1906–1911)
- Southern Intercollegiate Athletic Association (1912–1921)
- Southern Conference (1922–1932)
- Southeastern Conference (1932–present)

== Championships ==
=== National championships ===
The Florida Gators have been named national champions five times by NCAA-designated major selectors.

==== Claimed national championships ====
Florida claims three national championships, for the 1996, 2006 and 2008 seasons. At the end of each season the Gators were ranked No. 1 in both the final AP and Coaches polls and were recognized as consensus national champions after winning a designated national championship bowl game.

Year	Coach	Selector	Record	Bowl	Opponent	Result	Final AP	Final Coaches
1996	Steve Spurrier	AP, Coaches	12–1	Sugar Bowl (Bowl Alliance National Championship Game)	Florida State	W 52–20	No. 1	No. 1
2006	Urban Meyer	AP, Coaches, BCS	13–1	BCS National Championship Game	Ohio State	W 41–14	No. 1	No. 1
2008	Urban Meyer	AP, Coaches, BCS	13–1	BCS National Championship Game	Oklahoma	W 24–14	No. 1	No. 1

==== Unclaimed national championships ====
Florida has been named national champion by NCAA-designated "major selectors" in two additional years, 1984 and 1985. Partially because the football program was on NCAA probation in the mid-1980s, the university has never claimed a share of the national championship for either season.

Year	Coach	Selector	Record	Final AP	Final Coaches
1984	Charley Pell, Galen Hall	DeS, DuS, MGR, NYT, R(FACT), SN, SR	9–1–1	No. 3	No. 7
1985	Galen Hall	SR	9–1–1	No. 5	

=== Conference championships ===
Florida has won eight officially recognized SEC football championships. The Gators won their first championship with a conference record of 5–0–1 in 1984, but the title was vacated several months after the season by the SEC university presidents because of NCAA infractions by the Florida coaching staff under Charley Pell. The 1985 and 1990 teams also finished atop the standings with conference records of 5–1 and 6–1, respectively, but Florida was ineligible for the championship due to its NCAA probation for rule violations by previous coaching staffs. The Gators won their first official SEC football championship in 1991.

Season	Conference	Coach	Overall Record	Conference Record
1991	SEC	Steve Spurrier	10–2	7–0
1993	SEC	Steve Spurrier	11–2	7–1
1994	SEC	Steve Spurrier	10–2–1	7–1
1995	SEC	Steve Spurrier	12–1	8–0
1996	SEC	Steve Spurrier	12–1	8–0
2000	SEC	Steve Spurrier	10–3	7–1
2006	SEC	Urban Meyer	13–1	7–1
2008	SEC	Urban Meyer	13–1	7–1

=== Division championships ===
With the addition of Arkansas and South Carolina to the Southeastern Conference in 1992, the conference split into eastern and western divisions and a game between the division winners determined the SEC champion. Florida has made thirteen appearances in the SEC Championship Game, most recently in 2020. The Gators have a 7–6 record all-time in SEC Championship Games. With the additions of Texas and Oklahoma to the SEC in 2024, the conference eliminated divisions that year.

Season	Division	Coach	Opponent	CG result
1992†	SEC; East	Steve Spurrier	Alabama	L 21–28
1993	SEC; East	Steve Spurrier	Alabama	W 28–13
1994	SEC; East	Steve Spurrier	Alabama	W 24–23
1995	SEC; East	Steve Spurrier	Arkansas	W 34–3
1996	SEC; East	Steve Spurrier	Alabama	W 45–30
1999	SEC; East	Steve Spurrier	Alabama	L 7–34
2000	SEC; East	Steve Spurrier	Auburn	W 28–6
2003†	SEC; East	Ron Zook	–	–
2006	SEC; East	Urban Meyer	Arkansas	W 38–28
2008	SEC; East	Urban Meyer	Alabama	W 31–20
2009	SEC; East	Urban Meyer	Alabama	L 13–32
2012†	SEC; East	Will Muschamp	–	–
2015	SEC; East	Jim McElwain	Alabama	L 15–29
2016	SEC; East	Jim McElwain	Alabama	L 16–54
2020	SEC; East	Dan Mullen	Alabama	L 46–52

†Florida tied with Georgia atop the SEC east during the 1992 season and played in the 1992 SEC Championship Game by virtue of its head-to-head victory. Florida, Georgia, and Tennessee ended the regular season in a 3-way tie in 2003, but Georgia advanced to the 2003 SEC Championship Game due to its higher BCS ranking. Florida and Georgia again tied atop the SEC East in 2012 but Georgia advanced to the 2012 SEC Championship Game by virtue of its head-to-head victory.

=== Current Coaching Staff ===
Florida Gators
Name	Position	Consecutive season at Florida in current position	Previous position
Buster Faulkner	Offensive Coordinator	1st	Georgia Tech – Offensive Coordinator
Brad White	Defensive Coordinator	1st	Kentucky – Defensive Coordinator / Outside Linebackers
Gerald Chatman	Assistant Head Coach / Defensive Line	3rd	Tulane – Defensive Line
Phil Trautwein	Offensive Line	1st	Penn State – Offensive Line
Marcus Davis	Outside Wide receivers	1st	Auburn – Wide Receivers
Trent McKnight	Passing Game Coordinator / Inside Wide Receivers	1st	Georgia Tech – Wide Receivers
Joe Craddock	Quarterbacks	1st	Tulane – Offensive Coordinator and Quarterbacks
Chris Foster	Running Back	1st	Duke - Running Backs
Evan McKissack	Tight Ends	1st	Tulane – Co-Offensive Coordinator / Offensive Line
Brandon Harris	Cornerbacks	1st	UCF – Defensive Backs
Chris Collins	Safeties	1st	Kentucky – Co-Defensive Coordinator and Defensive Backs
Greg Gasparato	Linebackers	1st	Tulane – Defensive Coordinator / Safeties
Bam Hardmon	Outside Linebackers	1st	Tulane – Running Game Coordinator / Outside Linebackers
Johnathan Galante	Special Teams Coordinator	1st	Tulane – Special Teams Coordinator
Rusty Whitt	Director of Football Performance	1st	Tulane – Director of Strength and Conditioning

== Head coaches ==
Years Coached	Seasons	Name	Record
1906 – 1908	3	Jack Forsythe	14–6–2
1909 – 1913	5	George Pyle	26–7–3
1914 – 1916	3	C.J. McCoy	9–10–0
1917 – 1919	3	Al Buser	7–8–0
1920 – 1922	3	William Kline	19–8–2
1923 – 1924	2	James Van Fleet	12–3–4
1925 – 1927	3	Tom Sebring	17–11–2
1928 – 1932	5	Charlie Bachman	27–18–3
1933 – 1935	3	Dutch Stanley	14–13–2
1936 – 1939	4	Josh Cody	17–24–2
1940 – 1942, 1944 – 1945	5	Tom Lieb	20–26–1
1946 – 1949	4	Raymond Wolf	13–24–2
1950 – 1959	10	Bob Woodruff	53–42–6
1960 – 1969	10	Ray Graves	70–31–4
1970 – 1978	9	Doug Dickey	58–43–2
1979 – 1984	6	Charley Pell	33–26–3
1984 – 1989	6	Galen Hall	40–18–1
1989	1	Gary Darnell*	3–4–0
1990 – 2001	12	Steve Spurrier	122–27–1
2002 – 2004	3	Ron Zook	23–14
2004	1	Charlie Strong*	0–1
2005 – 2010	6	Urban Meyer	65–15
2011 – 2014	4	Will Muschamp	28–21
2014	1	D.J. Durkin*	1–0
2015 – 2017	3	Jim McElwain	22–12
2017	1	Randy Shannon*	1–3
2018 – 2021	4	Dan Mullen	34–15
2021	1	Greg Knox*	1–1
2022 – 2025	4	Billy Napier	22–23
2025	1	Billy Gonzales*	1–4
2026	1	Jon Sumrall	6–4
*indicates interim/acting head coach

== Bowl games ==
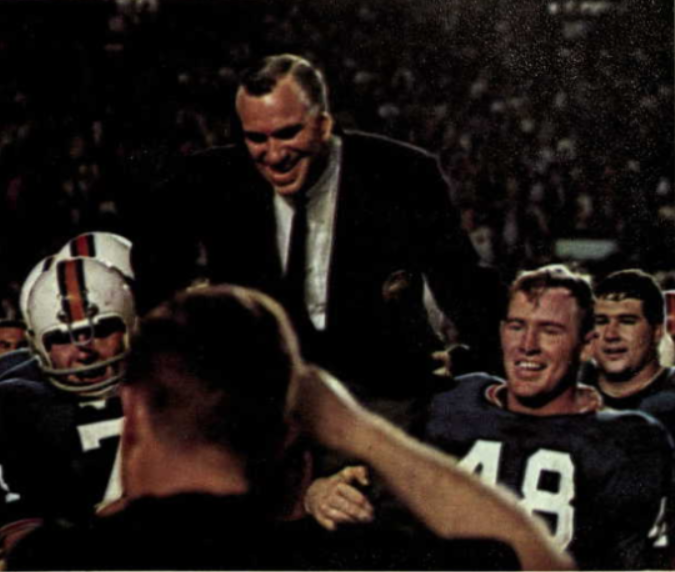
Ray Graves is carried from the field by his players after the 1967 Orange Bowl victory.

Florida has appeared in 49 NCAA-sanctioned bowl games, garnering a 25–24 record. This includes a streak of 22 consecutive bowl-game appearances from 1991 through 2012, the fifth-longest in college football history. Four of their bowl games were for a National Championship, with two under the Bowl Alliance and two in the Bowl Championship Series. Florida is 3–1 in national championship games.

Season	Coach	Bowl	Opponent	Result
1912	George E. Pyle	Bacardi Bowl†	Vedado Athletic Club	W 28–0
1952	Bob Woodruff	Gator Bowl	Tulsa	W 14–13
1958	Bob Woodruff	Gator Bowl	Mississippi	L 3–7
1960	Ray Graves	Gator Bowl	Baylor	W 13–12
1962	Ray Graves	Gator Bowl	Penn State	W 17–7
1965	Ray Graves	Sugar Bowl	Missouri	L 18–20
1966	Ray Graves	Orange Bowl	Georgia Tech	W 27–12
1969	Ray Graves	Gator Bowl	Tennessee	W 14–13
1973	Doug Dickey	Tangerine Bowl	Miami (OH)	L 7–16
1974	Doug Dickey	Sugar Bowl	Nebraska	L 10–13
1975	Doug Dickey	Gator Bowl	Maryland	L 0–13
1976	Doug Dickey	Sun Bowl	Texas A&M	L 14–37
1980	Charley Pell	Tangerine Bowl	Maryland	W 35–20
1981	Charley Pell	Peach Bowl	West Virginia	L 6–26
1982	Charley Pell	Astro-Bluebonnet Bowl	Arkansas	L 24–28
1983	Charley Pell	Gator Bowl	Iowa	W 14–6
1987	Galen Hall	Aloha Bowl	UCLA	L 16–20
1988	Galen Hall	All-American Bowl	Illinois	W 14–10
1989	Gary Darnell (interim)	Freedom Bowl	Washington	L 7–34
1991	Steve Spurrier	Sugar Bowl‡	Notre Dame	L 28–39
1992	Steve Spurrier	Gator Bowl	NC State	W 27–10
1993	Steve Spurrier	Sugar Bowl‡	West Virginia	W 41–7
1994	Steve Spurrier	Sugar Bowl‡	Florida State	L 17–23
1995	Steve Spurrier	Fiesta Bowl‡	Nebraska	L 24–62
1996	Steve Spurrier	Sugar Bowl‡	Florida State	W 52–20
1997	Steve Spurrier	Florida Citrus Bowl	Penn State	W 21–6
1998	Steve Spurrier	Orange Bowl‡	Syracuse	W 31–10
1999	Steve Spurrier	Florida Citrus Bowl	Michigan State	L 34–37
2000	Steve Spurrier	Sugar Bowl‡	Miami (FL)	L 20–37
2001	Steve Spurrier	Orange Bowl‡	Maryland	W 56–23
2002	Ron Zook	Outback Bowl	Michigan	L 30–38
2003	Ron Zook	Outback Bowl	Iowa	L 17–37
2004	Charlie Strong (interim)	Peach Bowl	Miami (FL)	L 10–27
2005	Urban Meyer	Outback Bowl	Iowa	W 31–24
2006	Urban Meyer	BCS National Championship Game‡	Ohio State	W 41–14
2007	Urban Meyer	Capital One Bowl	Michigan	L 35–41
2008	Urban Meyer	BCS National Championship Game‡	Oklahoma	W 24–14
2009	Urban Meyer	Sugar Bowl‡	Cincinnati	W 51–24
2010	Urban Meyer	Outback Bowl	Penn State	W 37–24
2011	Will Muschamp	Gator Bowl	Ohio State	W 24–17
2012	Will Muschamp	Sugar Bowl‡	Louisville	L 23–33
2014	D. J. Durkin (interim)	Birmingham Bowl	East Carolina	W 28–20
2015	Jim McElwain	Citrus Bowl	Michigan	L 7–41
2016	Jim McElwain	Outback Bowl	Iowa	W 30–3
2018	Dan Mullen	Peach Bowl‡	Michigan	W 41–15
2019	Dan Mullen	Orange Bowl‡	Virginia	W 36–28
2020	Dan Mullen	Cotton Bowl‡	Oklahoma	L 20–55
2021	Greg Knox (interim)	Gasparilla Bowl	UCF	L 17–29
2022	Billy Napier	Las Vegas Bowl	Oregon State	L 3–30
2024	Billy Napier	Gasparilla Bowl	Tulane	W 33–8

† The 1912 Bacardi Bowl held in Havana, Cuba was not sanctioned by the NCAA and was intended to be one half of a two-game event which was not completed due to a dispute over the rules of the game. As such, the University of Florida Athletic Association does not include the contest in the Gators' official bowl record.
‡ Coalition, Alliance, BCS or New Year's Six Bowl game.

Records by Bowl Game
Bowl	Record	Appearances	Last appearance	Winning %
All-American Bowl	1–0	1	1988	1.000
Aloha Bowl	0–1	1	1987	.000
Astro-Bluebonnet Bowl	0–1	1	1982	.000
BCS National Championship Game	2–0	2	2008	1.000
Birmingham Bowl	1–0	1	2014	1.000
Citrus Bowl (Capital One Bowl)	2–4	6	2015	.333
Cotton Bowl	0–1	1	2020	.000
Fiesta Bowl	0–1	1	1995	.000
Freedom Bowl	0–1	1	1989	.000
Gasparilla Bowl	1–1	2	2024	.500
Gator Bowl	7–2	9	2011	.778
Las Vegas Bowl	0–1	1	2022	–
Outback Bowl	3–2	5	2016	.600
Orange Bowl	4–0	4	2019	1.000
Peach Bowl	1–2	3	2018	.333
Sugar Bowl	3–6	9	2012	.333
Sun Bowl	0–1	1	1976	.000

== Records against SEC and in-state opponents ==
=== Conference schedule and all-time record against current SEC teams ===
The Southeastern Conference was established in 1932. For the next several decades, member schools arranged their own football schedules, resulting in situations in which some played annually while others would go many years without playing. In Florida's case, the Gators began an annual rivalry with Georgia in the early 1930s, and LSU, Auburn, and Kentucky became regular opponents after World War 2. However, primarily due to the expense and slow pace of train travel across the south at the time, Florida's schedule rarely included SEC foes Tennessee, Alabama, or Mississippi over the first 50 years of league play.

In 1992, the SEC expanded to 12 teams, split into two divisions, and established a standardized eight game league schedule. Florida was placed in the East Division along with Georgia, Kentucky, South Carolina, Tennessee, and Vanderbilt. For the next twenty seasons, Florida's schedule included games against all five division opponents, annual match-ups with cross-division rivals Auburn and LSU, and a game against another West Division opponent on a multi-year rotation. When the conference expanded to 14 teams in 2012, new East Division member Missouri was added to Florida's annual slate and Auburn was dropped as a yearly opponent.

Conference schedules dramatically changed again in 2024, when the SEC expanded to 16 teams. The league eliminated divisions and, after school leaders could not agree on a proposal to move to a nine game slate, established a stop-gap eight game schedule which attempted to preserve most traditional conference rivalries. Though the league attempted to create balanced schedules, many sports media observers opined that, with the addition of non-conference rivals Miami and FSU, Florida's 2024 slate was the most challenging in the nation, and perhaps one of the most challenging schedules in college football history. The Gators faced the same conference opponents in 2025, as the SEC simply reversed the sites of every 2024 game to create home-and-home competitions over the course of two seasons.

For 2026, the SEC moved to a nine game schedule and set a three year rotation which would see every team face off against every other conference foe at least once during that period. However, this came at the expense at some traditional rivalries; in 2026, Tennessee was missing from Florida's schedule for the first time since 1989, and LSU was missing for the first time since 1970.

The table below includes non-conference meetings played either before the founding of the SEC or before Florida's opponent joined the conference.

Opponent	Won	Lost	Tied	Percentage	Streak	First	Last	Next
Alabama	14	28	0	.333	Lost 8	1916	2021	2027
Arkansas	10	3	0	.769	Lost 1	1982	2023	2027
Auburn	40	43	2	.482	Won 2	1912	2026	2028
Georgia	44	58	2	.433	Lost 6	1915	2026	2027
Kentucky	55	22	0	.714	Won 1	1917	2026	2027
LSU	34	35	3	.493	Lost 1	1937	2025	2027
Mississippi State	36	19	2	.649	Won 3	1923	2025	2027
Missouri	6	8	0	.429	Lost 2	1966	2026	2028
Oklahoma	1	2	0	.333	Lost 2	2009	2026	2028
Ole Miss	14	13	1	.518	Won 1	1926	2026	2028
South Carolina	31	11	3	.722	Lost 1	1911	2026	2027
Tennessee	32	23	0	.582	Lost 1	1916	2025	2027
Texas	2	3	1	.417	Won 2	1940	2026	2028
Texas A&M	3	5	0	.375	Lost 2	1962	2025	2027
Vanderbilt	44	11	2	.789	Won 1	1945	2023	2026
Totals	364	280	16	.564				

Records as of October 22, 2026.

=== All-time record against former SEC teams ===
The Southeastern Conference was founded in 1932 by thirteen member institutions. Three original members had left by 1966 and six were added from 1992 onwards. The following table includes some games played before, during, and after the opponents' SEC tenure.

Opponent	Left SEC	Won	Lost	Tied	Percentage	Streak	First	Last	Next
Georgia Tech	1964	9	23	6	.316	Won 1	1912	1981	TBD
Sewanee	1940	7	2	0	.778	Won 7	1914	1938	N/A
Tulane	1966	14	6	2	.682	Won 12	1915	2024	TBD

Records as of the end of the 2024 season.

=== All-time record against in-state opponents ===
Between the establishment of the university's athletic program in 1906 and the beginning of SEC play in 1933, Florida football teams played irregular schedules which mostly featured contests against in-state private colleges, some of which became rivals. Of those early opponents, Florida Southern, Tampa, and Rollins no longer sponsor intercollegiate football programs, and after dropping the sport for half a century, Stetson competes in a lower division. Florida also scheduled occasional games against teams organized by amateur athletic clubs or military bases during the first half of the 20th century, but the Gators have not faced off against a non-collegiate opponent since 1945.

Florida began an annual rivalry with the Miami Hurricanes in 1938 that continued uninterrupted until 1987. The teams have met on an occasional basis since then and are still considered rivals. Florida State established a football program in 1947 and first faced Florida in 1958, beginning an annual series that has been uninterrupted except for the COVID-19 shortened 2020 season.

Opponent	Won	Lost	Tied	Percentage	Streak	First	Last	Next
FIU	1	0	0	1.000	Won 1	2009	2009	TBD
Florida A&M	1	0	0	1.000	Won 1	2003	2003	2030
Florida Atlantic	5	0	0	1.000	Won 5	2007	2026	TBD
Florida Southern	13	1	0	.929	Won 7	1913	1930	N/A
Florida State	39	28	2	.580	Won 2	1958	2025	2026
Miami	27	31	0	.466	Lost 2	1938	2025	TBD
Rollins	13	2	1	.844	Won 11	1906	1948	N/A
South Florida	3	1	0	.750	Lost 1	2010	2025	TBD
Stetson	15	2	2	.842	Won 3	1908	1953	TBD
Tampa	5	0	0	1.000	Won 5	1938	1942	N/A
UCF	3	1	0	.750	Won 1	1999	2024	2030
Totals	125	66	5	.651				

Records as of September 5, 2026.

== Rivalries ==
=== Alabama ===
Although the series started in 1916, many consider the rivalry between Florida and Alabama to have started in 1992, with the advent of the SEC Championship Game. Florida has appeared in 13 of the 30 conference championship games with Alabama appearing in 14. 10 of those matches were against each other, the most common matchup so far. Alabama leads the conference championship match-up 6–4, following the most recent match-up between both programs, the 2020 SEC Championship Game, which saw Alabama beat Florida 52–46.

Alabama leads the series 28–14 since the end of the 2021 season.

=== Auburn ===
Auburn and Florida played annually from 1945 to 2002. In the overall series won-lost record, Auburn is Florida's most evenly matched SEC opponent. Beginning in the 1980s, one team was usually highly ranked coming into the game and it had conference- and national-title implications. The series has had several notable upsets. Auburn defeated previously unbeaten Florida teams in 1993, 1994, 2001, 2006 and 2007, although the Gators won SEC championships in 1993, 1994 and 2006.

The annual series ended in 2002, when the SEC adjusted its football schedules so each team played one permanent and two rotating opponents from the opposite SEC division every year (instead of one rotating and two permanent teams). Due to Auburn having a much longer history vs. Georgia ("Deep South's Oldest Rivalry"), the Tigers and Bulldogs kept each other as their permanent crossover foe.

When Texas A&M and Missouri joined the conference in 2012, the schedule was changed again; each team played one permanent and one rotating opponent from the opposite division every year. LSU was designated as Florida's annual SEC Western Division opponent, and Florida and Auburn play two regular-season games every 12 years. Auburn leads the series 43–40–2 through the 2026 season.

=== Florida State ===
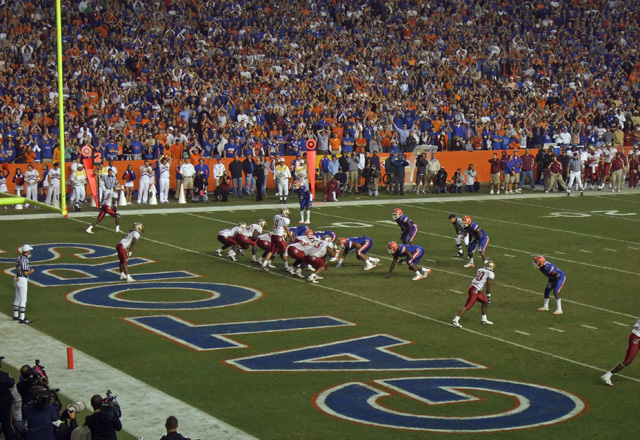
2007 Florida State game

The University of Florida and the Florida State College for Women became co-educational in 1947. The new Florida State Seminoles football team began playing small colleges, moving up to the major-college ranks in 1955. Almost immediately, Florida State students and supporters called for the teams of Florida's two largest universities to play each other annually.

Contrary to popular belief, Florida's state legislature did not decree that Florida and Florida State should meet on the field; a bill mandating the game was rejected by the Florida Senate. Prodding by Florida governor LeRoy Collins facilitated an agreement between the two universities to begin an annual series in 1958. Due to Florida State's smaller stadium, the first six games were played at Florida Field. The series has alternated between the campuses since 1964, when Doak Campbell Stadium in Tallahassee was expanded. The Florida–Florida State game has had national-championship implications since 1990, and both teams have entered the game with top-10 rankings thirteen times. Among these was the Sugar Bowl rematch at the end of the 1996 season, when Florida avenged its only regular-season loss and won its first national championship 52–20.

Florida dominated the early series with a 16–2–1 record through 1976. Both teams have produced significant winning streaks, and the series is nearly tied over the past four decades; Florida State holds a 21–20–1 advantage since 1980. Since 2000, the teams share 10-10 records against one another. Florida leads the all-time series 39–28–2 through the 2025 season.

=== Georgia ===
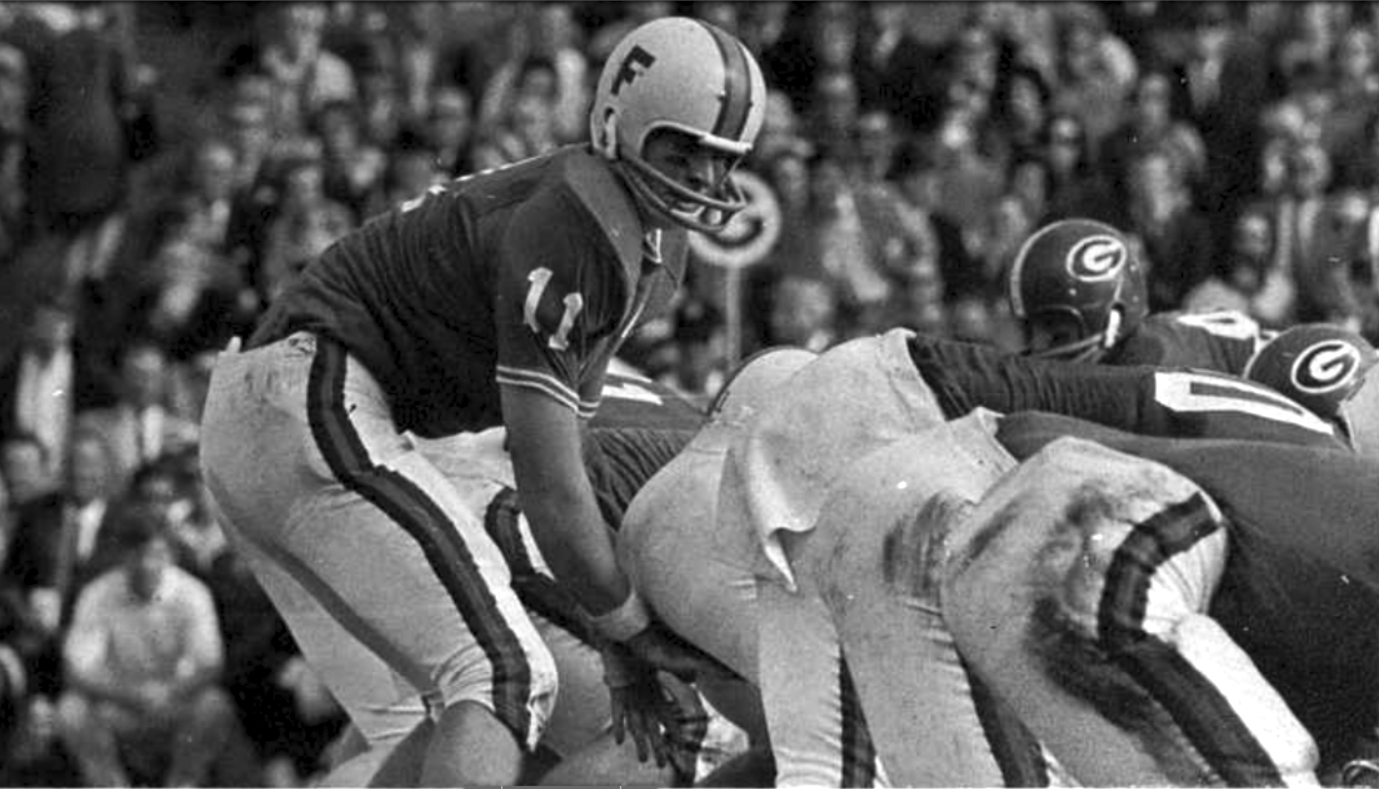
Steve Spurrier under center v. Georgia, 1966

Historically, Florida's most hated and fierce rival has been the Georgia Bulldogs. Previously known as "The World's Largest Outdoor Cocktail Party," and now most commonly called the "Florida–Georgia game" by Gator fans, this rivalry often decides the SEC East and has national implications. The game is held at EverBank Stadium in Jacksonville, Florida, usually on the last Saturday in October or the first Saturday in November. The designated "home" team alternates, with ticket distribution split evenly between the schools. Since 2009, the Okefenokee Oar has been awarded to the winner of the Florida-Georgia game.

In the rivalry's early years, games rotated among locations in Savannah, Tampa, Jacksonville and, occasionally, Gainesville and Athens. Since 1933 the game has been played in Jacksonville, except for in 1994 and 1995 when the teams played a pair of home-and-home games at their respective stadiums, and in 2026 (Mercedes-Benz Stadium in Atlanta) and 2027 (Raymond James Stadium in Tampa) due to ongoing renovations at EverBank Stadium. Georgia had early success in the rivalry, winning the first six games and holding a 21–5–1 series lead before 1950. After the 2018 game Florida has won 21 out of the most-recent 31 games, and holds a 38–32–1 advantage in the series since 1950. Georgia lead the series overall 58–44–2 through the 2026 season.

=== Kentucky ===
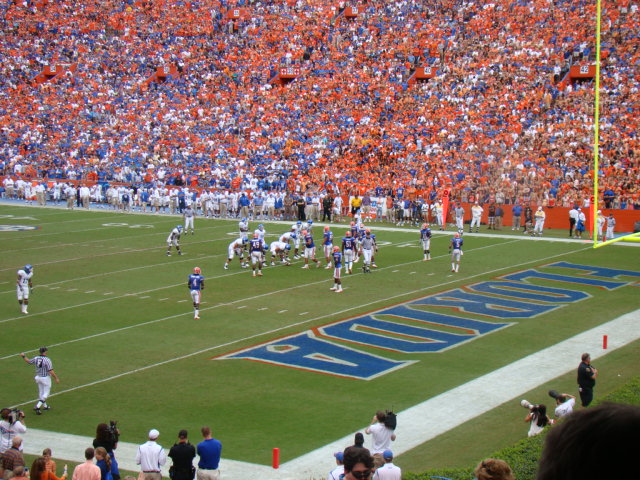
Ben Hill Griffin Stadium during the 2008 Florida–Kentucky game in which Florida would win 63–5.

When the Southeastern Conference split into geographical divisions in 1992, Florida and Kentucky were both placed in the SEC East. This guarantees that both teams play each other every season, which they have done consecutively since 1967. The Gators and Wildcats will meet in 2024 despite the end of SEC divisions after the 2023 season. The two teams have played 77 times, with Florida holding a 55–22 lead in the series. From 1987 to 2017, Florida won every single game between the two schools. This 31-year streak was the third longest in FBS history, and the longest in the Southeastern Conference's history. Since 2017, the series has become incredibly competitive with a 4–3 split between the two teams with the winning margin being 11.4 points on average. Because of these factors, this rivalry is relatively new even though the series dates back to 1917.

Former Florida head coach Steve Spurrier was notable for having a particular disdain for Kentucky. During his tenure at Florida, he was known for running up the score in non-competitive games. In his 12 years coaching the Gators, Spurrier never lost to Kentucky, winning by an average score of 32.7 points. Spurrier was famous for the comments he made about his opponents (often referred to as "Spurrierisms") but he poked fun at Kentucky the most. Even after leaving Florida, Steve Spurrier would go out of his way to make comments at Kentucky's expense. In November 2004, Steve Spurrier accepted the head coaching job at the University of South Carolina. In 2006, the South Carolina Gamecocks upset their rival, the Clemson Tigers. In the following week, Clemson would go on to lose to Kentucky in the 2006 Music City Bowl. Following the bowl game, Steve Spurrier said" "We thought we had done something good beating Clemson. And then Kentucky beat 'em."

=== LSU ===
Florida and LSU first met on the football field in 1937, and have been annual opponents since 1971. From 1992-2023, LSU was Florida's permanent inter-divisional rival from the SEC Western Division (the Gators also played Auburn yearly from 1992-2001 when the SEC assigned each team two permanent crossover opponents). The winner of the Florida–LSU game went on to win the Bowl Championship Series (BCS) national championship game in the 2006, 2007, 2008, and 2019 seasons. This rivalry has been known recently for close games, with both teams highly ranked. Florida leads the all-time series 34–32–3 through the 2025 season; the series will take a year off in 2026 and return in 2027. Three LSU wins (2013, '14 and '15) were vacated in 2023.

=== Miami ===
Miami is Florida's only pre-World War II in-state rival that still plays major college football. The schools first met on the gridiron in 1938 and again every season until 1987, when the SEC's expansion of its conference schedule to seven games precluded the annual matchup. A contract to renew the annual rivalry in the 1990s fell through when the SEC expanded its schedule again to eight games, and the Florida and Miami did not play again until the 2001 Sugar Bowl. The home and home series briefly resumed in 2002 and 2003, and they played again in the 2004 Peach Bowl. Since then, the schools have played intermittently during the regular season, with home and home series split across several years.

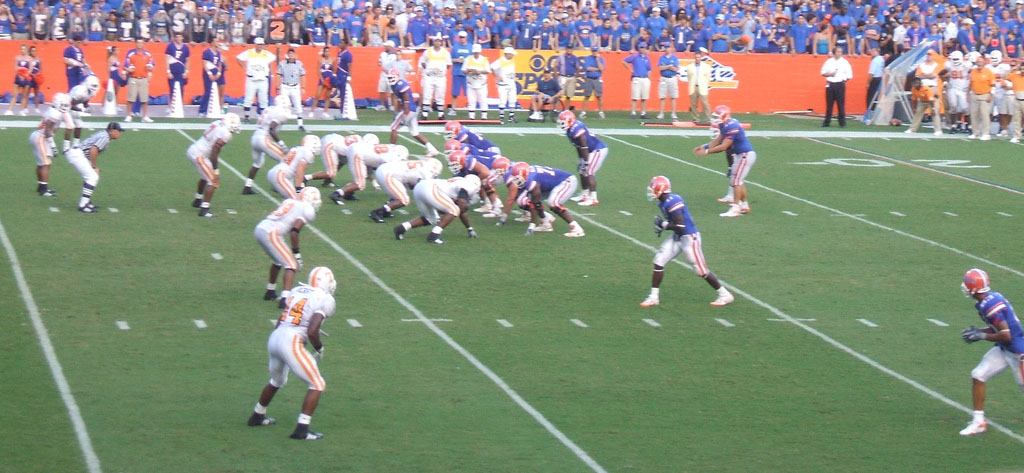
Tim Tebow in the spread v. Tennessee, 2007

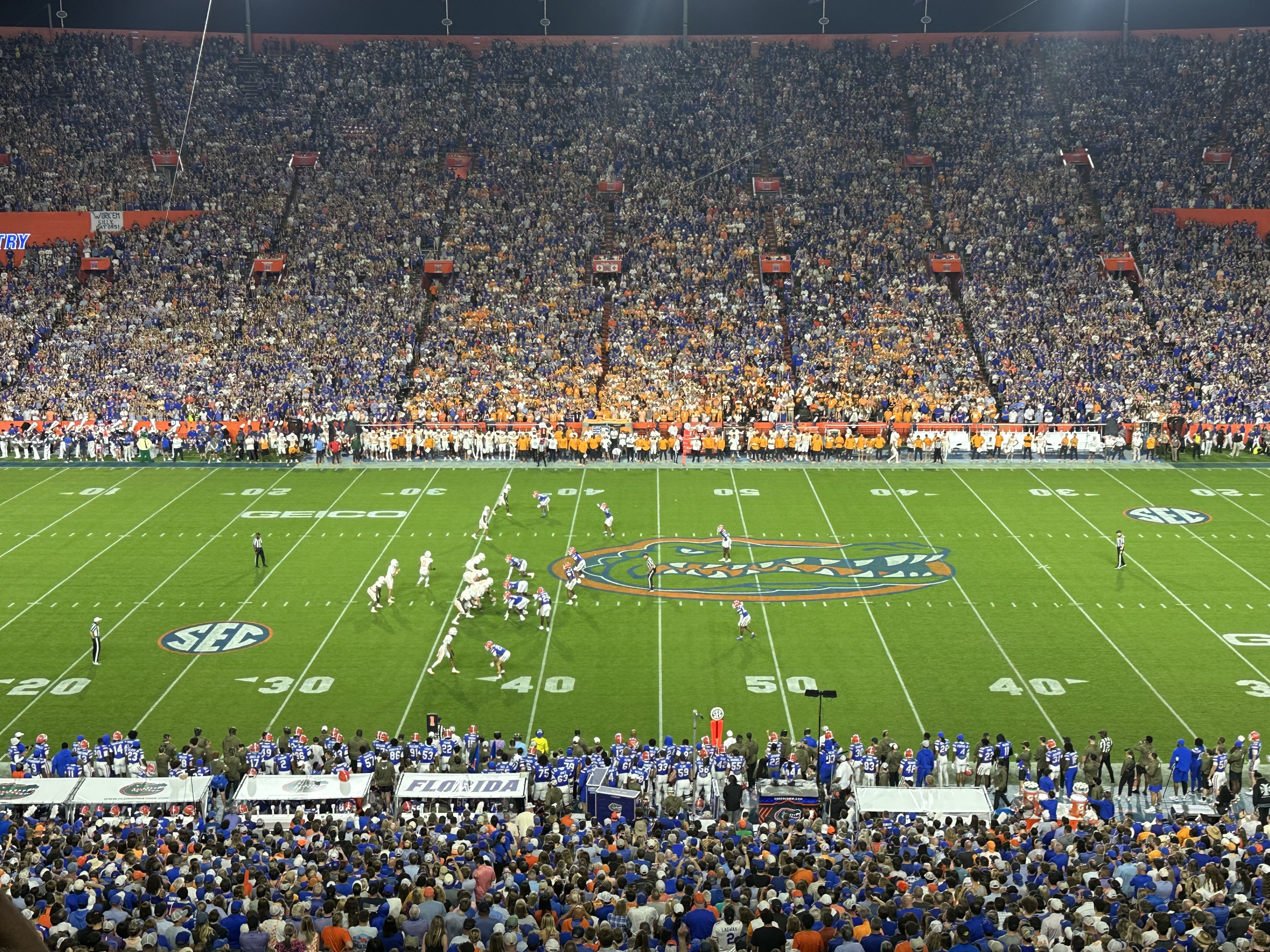
Ben Hill Griffin Stadium during a Florida Gators football game against the Tennessee Volunteers in November 2025.

Miami leads the series 30–27 through the 2024 season. The next scheduled matchup between the schools will be in Miami Gardens on September 20, 2025.

=== Tennessee ===
Although Florida and Tennessee are charter members of the SEC, irregular conference scheduling resulted in the teams meeting infrequently for many years. Tennessee won the first ten games between 1916 and 1954, when Florida finally defeated the Volunteers. In 1969, Florida hired Tennessee head coach (and former Florida quarterback) Doug Dickey to replace the retiring Ray Graves immediately after their teams met in the Gator Bowl.

The rivalry reached a peak during the 1990s. In 1992, the SEC expanded to twelve schools and split into two divisions. Florida and Tennessee (in the Eastern Division) have met every year since, usually in mid-September for both teams' first conference game of the season. Led by coaches Steve Spurrier and Phillip Fulmer and featuring players such as Danny Wuerffel and Peyton Manning, both teams were regularly ranked in the top 10 when they met, giving the rivalry conference and national title implications. Florida and Tennessee combined to win six SEC titles and two national championships during the 1990s.

Since becoming annual opponents in 1992, the Gators and Volunteers have combined to represent the Eastern Division in the SEC Championship Game 16 times. Florida had an 11-game winning streak against Tennessee (2005–2015) and leads the series 33–21 following the 2024 season.

== Future opponents ==
=== Conference opponents ===
Starting in 2026, the SEC will move to a 9-game conference schedule, with three permanent opponents.

The SEC announced the opponents and sites for Florida's conference games for the 2026–2029 seasons. Florida's annual opponents through the 2029 season are Georgia, South Carolina, and Kentucky. The other six conference games will rotate through other conference opponents, playing each opponent at least once every two years.

==== 2026 Conference Schedule ====
Opponent	Site	Result
vs. No. 3 Georgia	Mercedes-Benz Stadium; Atlanta, GA (rivalry)	L 27–8
at No. 13 Kentucky	Kroger Field; Lexington, KY (rivalry)	W 21-14
at Auburn	Jordan–Hare Stadium; Auburn, AL (rivalry)	W 44–39
No. 4 Ole Miss	Ben Hill Griffin Stadium; Gainesville, FL	W 52–28
at No. 25 Missouri	Faurot Field at Memorial Stadium; Columbia, MO	L 17–45
South Carolina	Ben Hill Griffin Stadium; Gainesville, FL	L 19–38
Oklahoma	Ben Hill Griffin Stadium; Gainesville, FL	L 23–7
at No. 6 Texas	Darrell K Royal–Texas Memorial Stadium; Austin, TX	W 27–24
Vanderbilt	Ben Hill Griffin Stadium; Gainesville, FL	
Rankings from Coaches' Poll released prior to the game

==== 2027 Conference Schedule ====
Opponent	Site	Result
vs. Georgia	Raymond James Stadium; Tampa, FL (rivalry)	
Kentucky	Ben Hill Griffin Stadium; Gainesville, FL (rivalry)	
at Mississippi State	Davis Wade Stadium; Starkville, MS	
LSU	Ben Hill Griffin Stadium; Gainesville, FL (rivalry)	
at Tennessee	Neyland Stadium; Knoxville, TN (rivalry)	
Arkansas	Ben Hill Griffin Stadium; Gainesville, FL	
Texas A&M	Ben Hill Griffin Stadium; Gainesville, FL	
at Alabama	Bryant–Denny Stadium; Tuscaloosa, AL (rivalry)	
at South Carolina	Williams–Brice Stadium; Columbia, SC	

==== 2028 Conference Schedule ====
Opponent	Site	Result
vs. Georgia	TIAA Bank Field; Jacksonville, FL (rivalry)	
at Kentucky	Kroger Field; Lexington, KY (rivalry)	
at Vanderbilt	FirstBank Stadium; Nashville, TN	
Auburn	Ben Hill Griffin Stadium; Gainesville, FL (rivalry)	
South Carolina	Ben Hill Griffin Stadium; Gainesville, FL	
at Ole Miss	Vaught-Hemingway Stadium; Oxford, MS	
Texas	Ben Hill Griffin Stadium; Gainesville, FL	
Missouri	Ben Hill Griffin Stadium; Gainesville, FL	
at Oklahoma	Gaylord Family Oklahoma Memorial Stadium; Norman, OK	

==== 2029 Conference Schedule ====
Opponent	Site	Result
vs. Georgia	TIAA Bank Field; Jacksonville, FL (rivalry)	
at Arkansas	Donald W. Reynolds Razorback Stadium; Fayetteville, AR	
at LSU	Tiger Stadium; Baton Rouge, LA (rivalry)	
Mississippi State	Ben Hill Griffin Stadium; Gainesville, FL	
at South Carolina	Williams–Brice Stadium; Columbia, SC	
Tennessee	Ben Hill Griffin Stadium; Gainesville, FL (rivalry)	
Kentucky	Ben Hill Griffin Stadium; Gainesville, FL (rivalry)	
at Texas A&M	Kyle Field; College Station, TX	
Alabama	Ben Hill Griffin Stadium; Gainesville, FL (rivalry)	

=== Non-conference opponents ===
Florida has played a continuous series against in-state rival Florida State (FSU) since 1958. While the eight game SEC slate (nine games starting in 2026) plus the annual matchup with FSU are set years in advance, the schedule allows for two additional non-conference games against various opponents that are usually played in Gainesville for revenue purposes. In recent years, Florida has been also invited to participate in several season opening non-conference neutral-site games which do not count against the NCAA cap on regular season games.

Announced opponents and dates are as of November 10, 2026. One scheduled non-conference game in 2028 must be postponed.

2026	2027	2028	2029	2030	2031	2032	2033
Florida Atlantic; Sep 5	South Alabama; Aug 28	Furman; Sep 2	at Colorado; Sep 8	Florida A&M; Aug 31	Arizona State; Sep 13		UCF; Sep 3
Campbell; Sep 12	Charleston Southern; Sep 11	Colorado; Sep 9		at UCF; Sep 14			
		at Arizona State; Sep 16					
at Florida State; Nov 28	Florida State; Nov 27	at Florida State; Nov 25	Florida State; Nov 24	at Florida State; Nov 30	Florida State; Nov 29	at Florida State; Nov 27	Florida State; Nov 26

== Individual award winners ==
- Heisman Trophy

Steve Spurrier (1966)
Danny Wuerffel (1996)
Tim Tebow (2007)

- Maxwell Award

Danny Wuerffel (1996)
Tim Tebow (2007, 2008)

- Walter Camp Award

Danny Wuerffel (1996)

- Sammy Baugh Trophy

John Reaves (1971)
Danny Wuerffel (1995)

- Davey O'Brien Award

Danny Wuerffel (1995, 1996)
Tim Tebow (2007)

- Rimington Trophy

Maurkice Pouncey (2009)

- Ray Guy Award

Chas Henry (2010)

- Jim Thorpe Award

Lawrence Wright (1996)

- Johnny Unitas Golden Arm Award

Danny Wuerffel (1996)

- Chic Harley Award

Steve Spurrier (1966)
Tim Tebow (2007)

- Lou Groza Award

Judd Davis (1993)

- John Mackey Award

Aaron Hernandez (2009)
Kyle Pitts (2020)

- Draddy Trophy

Brad Culpepper (1991)
Danny Wuerffel (1996)
Tim Tebow (2009)

- Wuerffel Trophy

Tim Tebow (2008)

- Manning Award

Tim Tebow (2008)

- Rhodes Scholarship

William McRae (1933)
Bill Kynes (1977)

=== College Football Hall of Fame members ===
Fifteen people associated with Florida have been inducted into the College Football Hall of Fame, six as head coaches and ten as players*.

Name	Position	Florida years	Inducted	Ref.
Carlos Alvarez	WR	1969–1971	2011	
Charlie Bachman	Coach	1928–1932	1978	
Lomas Brown	OT	1981–1984	2020	
Wes Chandler	WR	1974–1977	2015	
Doug Dickey	Coach	1970–1978	2003	
Ray Graves	Coach	1960–1969	1990	
Marcelino Huerta	Coach	1947–1949	2002	
Wilber Marshall	LB	1980–1983	2008	
Urban Meyer	Coach	2005–2010	2025	
Emmitt Smith	RB	1987–1989	2006	
Steve Spurrier	QB, Coach	1963–1966; 1990–2001	1986; 2017	
Dale Van Sickel	End	1927–1929	1975	
Tim Tebow	QB	2006-2009	2023	
Danny Wuerffel	QB	1993–1996	2013	
Jack Youngblood	DE	1967–1970	1992	

- Steve Spurrier was inducted into the Hall of Fame in 1986 for his record as Florida's Heisman Trophy-winning quarterback from 1964 to 1966 and again in 2017 for his head coaching achievements at Duke, Florida, and South Carolina. He is one of four members of the College Football Hall of Fame inducted as both a player and a coach.
- Doug Dickey, Florida's quarterback in 1951 and 1952, was inducted into the Hall of Fame in 2003 for his record as head coach of the Tennessee Volunteers from 1964 to 1969 and the Gators from 1970 to 1978.
- Marcelino Huerta, a standout Gator lineman from 1947 to 1949, was inducted in 2002 for his record as head coach of the Tampa Spartans, Wichita State Shockers and Parson Wildcats.

=== All-Americans ===
Since Florida's first season in 1906, 89 players have received one or more selections as first-team All-Americans. This includes 32 consensus All-Americans, of which six were unanimous. The first Florida first-team All-American was end Dale Van Sickel, a member of the 1928 team. Florida's first consensus All-American was quarterback Steve Spurrier, the winner of the Heisman Trophy for the 1966 Gators.

=== SEC Legends ===
Since 1994, the Southeastern Conference has annually designated one former football player from each SEC member school as an "SEC Legend." Through 2026, the following Gators have been named SEC Legends:

- Carlos Alvarez
- Jack Youngblood
- Kerwin Bell
- John Reaves
- Neal Anderson
- Nat Moore
- Glenn Cameron
- Huey Richardson
- Brad Culpepper
- Larry Smith
- Lomas Brown
- Trace Armstrong
- Louis Oliver
- Ralph Ortega
- Reidel Anthony
- Errict Rhett
- Kevin Carter
- Ike Hilliard
- Steve Tannen
- Wes Chandler
- Lito Sheppard
- Fred Taylor
- Steve Spurrier
- Danny Wuerffel
- Lawrence Wright
- Jevon Kearse
- Alex Brown
- Shane Matthews
- Rex Grossman
- Brandon Spikes
- Chris Doering

=== Fergie Ferguson Award ===
The Fergie Ferguson Award is given in memory of one of the University of Florida's finest athletes, Forest K. Ferguson. Ferguson was an All-SEC end for Florida in 1941 and state boxing champion in 1942. Subsequently, a second lieutenant in the U.S. Army, he led an infantry platoon during the D-Day landings in Normandy on June 6, 1944. Ferguson helped clear the way for his troops to advance on the Axis position, and was severely wounded leading his men in the assault. A recipient of the Distinguished Service Cross for his actions, he died from war-related injuries in 1954. The award, a trophy, is given to the senior football player who most displays "leadership, character, and courage."

=== Ring of Honor ===
The University of Florida Athletic Association established the Florida Football Ring of Honor in 2006 to recognize the program's greatest players and coaches during the 100th year of Gator football. (The Gators do not have any retired jersey numbers. Although Steve Spurrier's (11) and Scot Brantley's (55) numbers were retired in the 1970s, Spurrier reissued them when he was Florida's head coach, and numbers worn by all members of the Ring of Honor are available for use by current players.)

Ring of Honor | North end zone

Originally, members of the Ring of Honor had their jersey painted on the endzone facade at Ben Hill Griffin Stadium. When expanded video screens were installed in that location a few years later, inductees were each recognized with an 18-foot wide sign perched atop the north endzone grandstand. Five honorees were inducted in 2006 and 2007, with Tim Tebow added in 2018and former head coach Urban Meyer in 2026.

Name	Position	No.	Florida years	Inducted
Emmitt Smith	RB	22	1987–1989	2006
Steve Spurrier	QB	11	1964–1966 (player); 1990–2001 (coach)	2006
Danny Wuerffel	QB	7	1993–1996	2006
Jack Youngblood	DE	74	1967–1970	2006
Wilber Marshall	LB	88	1980–1983	2007
Tim Tebow	QB	15	2006–2009	2018
Urban Meyer	HC		2005–2010	2026

To be considered for induction into the Ring of Honor, a former player or coach must be absent from the university for five seasons, be in good standing, and meet at least one of the following criteria:

- Heisman Trophy winner (Spurrier, Wuerffel, Tebow)
- Former All-Americans inducted into the Pro Football Hall of Fame as players (Smith, Youngblood)
- Former All-Americans who are NFL career category leaders (Smith)
- College-career category leaders (Tebow)
- Coaches with one or more national championship (Spurrier)
- Coaches with three or more SEC championships (Spurrier)
- Players with two or more consensus All-America honors who were also named national offensive or defensive player of the year (Marshall, Tebow)

=== All-Time teams ===
A Florida Football All-Time Team was compiled by the Florida Alumnus, the official publication of the Florida alumni, in 1927.

First team
QB – Rammy Ramsdell
HB – Dummy Taylor
HB – Ed Jones
FB – Bill Middlekauff
E – Ferdinand H. Duncan
T – Cy Williams
G – Goldy Goldstein
C – Bo Gator Storter
G – Tootie Perry
T – Jim Coarsy
E – Joe Swanson

Second team
QB – Bob Shackleford
HB – Ark Newton
HB – Harvey Hester
FB – Ray Dickson
E – G. P. Wood
T – Pus Hancock
G – Arthur Doty
C – Lamar Sarra
G – Ed Meisch
T – Robbie Robinson
E – Frank Oosterhoudt

Another University of Florida all-time team was chosen by the Miami Herald according to a fan vote in August 1983.

First Team Offense
QB – Steve Spurrier
RB – Larry Smith
RB – Nat Moore
WR – Cris Collinsworth
WR – Wes Chandler
TE – Jim Yarbrough
OT – Randy Jackson
OT – Mike Williams
OG – Burton Lawless
OG – Guy Dennis
C – Bill Carr
PK – David Posey

First Team Defense
DL – Jack Youngblood
DL – Scott Hutchinson
DL – David Galloway
DL – Charlie LaPradd
LB – Ralph Ortega
LB – Scot Brantley
LB – Wilber Marshall
LB – Glenn Cameron
DB – Steve Tannen
DB – Jackie Simpson
DB – Bernie Parrish
P – Bobby Joe Green

Second Team Offense
QB – John Reaves
RB – Rick Casares
RB – James Jones
WR – Carlos Alvarez
WR – Charles Casey
TE – Chris Faulkner
OT – Mac Steen
OT – Charlie Mitchell
OG – Larry Beckman
OG – John Barrow
C – Steve DeLaTorre
PK – Brian Clark

Second Team Defense
DL – Robin Fisher
DL – Joe D'Agostino
DL – Lynn Matthews
DL – Vel Heckman
LB – David Little
LB – Fred Abbott
LB – Sammy Green
DB – Bruce Bennett
DB – Tony Lilly
DB – Hagood Clarke
P – Don Chandler

==== All-Century Team ====
The Florida Football All-Century Team, chosen by Gator fans, was compiled by The Gainesville Sun in the fall of 1999.

First Team Offense
QB – Danny Wuerffel (1993–96)
RB – Neal Anderson (1982–85)
RB – Emmitt Smith (1987–89)
WR – Carlos Alvarez (1969–71)
WR – Wes Chandler (1974–77)
TE – Jim Yarbrough (1966–68)
OT – Lomas Brown (1981–84)
OT – David Williams (1985–88)
OG – Burton Lawless (1972–74)
OG – Donnie Young (1993–96)
OC – Jeff Mitchell (1993–96)
PK – Judd Davis (1992–94)
KR – Jacquez Green (1995–97)

First Team Defense
DE – Jack Youngblood (1968–70)
DE – Kevin Carter (1991–94)
DT – Brad Culpepper (1988–91)
DT – Ellis Johnson (1991–94)
LB – Wilber Marshall (1980–83)
LB – Scot Brantley (1976–79)
LB – David Little (1977–80)
CB – Steve Tannen (1967–69)
CB – Jarvis Williams (1984–87)
S – Louis Oliver (1985–88)
S – Bruce Bennett (1963–65)
P – Bobby Joe Green (1958–59)

Second Team Offense
QB – Steve Spurrier (1964–66)
RB – Rick Casares (1951–53)
RB – James Jones (1979–82)
WR – Reidel Anthony (1994–96)
WR – Ike Hilliard (1994–96)
TE – Kirk Kirkpatrick (1987–90)
OT – Jason Odom (1992–95)
OT – Mike Williams (1973–75)
OG – Larry Gagner (1963–65)
OG – Jeff Zimmerman (1983–86)
OC – Phil Bromley (1981–84)
PK – David Posey (1973–76)
KR – Jack Jackson (1992–94)

Second Team Defense
DE – David Ghesquiere (1967–69)
DE – Lynn Matthews (1963–65)
DT – David Galloway (1979–81)
DT – Charlie LaPradd (1950–52)
LB – Sammy Green (1972–75)
LB – Alonzo Johnson (1983–85)
LB – Ralph Ortega (1972–74)
CB – Fred Weary (1994–97)
CB – Richard Fain (1987–90)
S – Tony Lilly (1980–83)
S – Wayne Fields (1972–75)
P – Ray Criswell (1982–85)

==== 100th-Anniversary Team ====
The 100th-Anniversary Florida Team was selected in 2006 to celebrate a century of Florida football. Fans voted by mail and online.

Offense
QB – Danny Wuerffel (1993–1996)
RB – Errict Rhett (1990–1993)
RB – Emmitt Smith (1987–1989)
RB – Fred Taylor (1994–1997)
WR – Carlos Alvarez (1969–1971)
WR – Cris Collinsworth (1977–1980)
WR – Chris Doering (1992–1995)
WR – Ike Hilliard (1994–1996)
OL – Lomas Brown (1981–1984)
OL – Mike Degory (2002–2005)
OL – Jeff Mitchell (1993–1996)
OL – Jason Odom (1992–1995)
PK – Jeff Chandler (1998–2001)

Defense
DL – Trace Armstrong (1988)
DL – Alex Brown (1998–2001)
DL – Kevin Carter (1991–1994)
DL – Brad Culpepper (1988–1991)
DL – Jack Youngblood (1968–1970)
LB – Scot Brantley (1976–1979)
LB – Channing Crowder (2003–2004)
LB – Jevon Kearse (1996–1998)
LB – Wilber Marshall (1980–1983)
DB – Louis Oliver (1985–1988)
DB – Lito Sheppard (1999–2001)
DB – Fred Weary (1994–1997)
P – Shayne Edge (1991–1994)

== Gators in the NFL ==
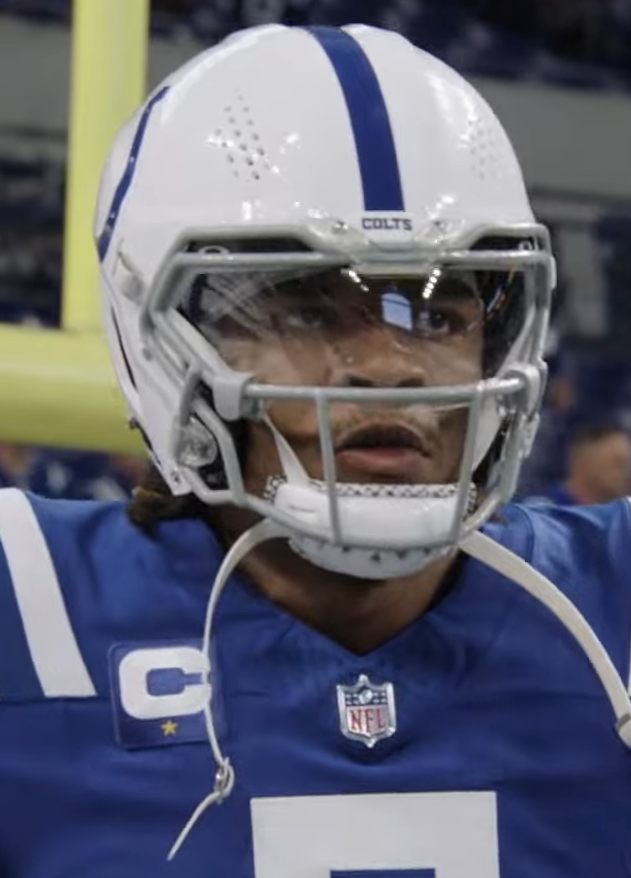
Anthony Richardson, selected fourth overall in the 2023 NFL draft

Florida has produced dozens of NFL draft selections, including 59 first-round picks, among the most in college football. At least one Gator has been selected in every NFL draft since 1967, the longest active streak by an SEC program. In the 2026 NFL draft, Florida had seven players selected, with at least one pick in each of the seven rounds, a first in program history.

=== Active NFL ===
As of August 2026, 55 former Florida players on NFL rosters.

- Alex Anzalone, Tampa Bay Buccaneers
- Caleb Banks, Minnesota Vikings
- Austin Barber, Cleveland Browns
- Trikweze Bridges, Dallas Cowboys
- Trent Brown, Houston Texans
- Jonathan Bullard, Dallas Cowboys
- Amari Burney, Jacksonville Jaguars
- Zachary Carter, Arizona Cardinals
- Brenton Cox Jr., Green Bay Packers
- Jeremy Crawshaw, Denver Broncos
- Brandon Crenshaw-Dickson, Tennessee Titans
- Malik Davis, Dallas Cowboys
- Trey Dean III, Green Bay Packers
- Gervon Dexter, Chicago Bears
- Chimere Dike, Tennessee Titans
- Tommy Doman, Buffalo Bills
- Kingsley Eguakun, Cleveland Browns
- Kaiir Elam, Kansas City Chiefs
- Stone Forsythe, Carolina Panthers
- Dante Fowler, Seattle Seahawks
- C. J. Gardner-Johnson, Buffalo Bills
- Jonathan Greenard, Philadelphia Eagles
- George Gumbs Jr., Indianapolis Colts
- C. J. Henderson, Atlanta Falcons
- D. J. Humphries, Washington Commanders
- Cam Jackson, Carolina Panthers
- Shemar James, Dallas Cowboys
- Van Jefferson, Washington Commanders
- Fred Johnson, Philadelphia Eagles
- Jason Marshall Jr., Miami Dolphins
- Evan McPherson, Cincinnati Bengals
- Graham Mertz, Houston Texans
- Ventrell Miller, Jacksonville Jaguars
- Jeremiah Moon, Carolina Panthers
- Devin Moore, Dallas Cowboys
- Ricky Pearsall, San Francisco 49ers
- Dameon Pierce, Philadelphia Eagles
- Eddy Piñeiro, San Francisco 49ers
- Kyle Pitts, Atlanta Falcons
- Anthony Richardson, Indianapolis Colts
- Demarcus Robinson, San Francisco 49ers
- Tyreak Sapp, Cleveland Browns
- David Sharpe, Baltimore Ravens
- Justin Shorter, Las Vegas Raiders
- Jake Slaughter, Los Angeles Chargers
- T. J. Slaton, Cincinnati Bengals
- Trey Smack, Green Bay Packers
- J. Michael Sturdivant, Green Bay Packers
- Jawaan Taylor, Atlanta Falcons
- O'Cyrus Torrence, Buffalo Bills
- Tommy Townsend, Tennessee Titans
- Kyle Trask, Carolina Panthers
- Rocco Underwood, Philadelphia Eagles
- Marco Wilson, Cincinnati Bengals

== Uniforms ==
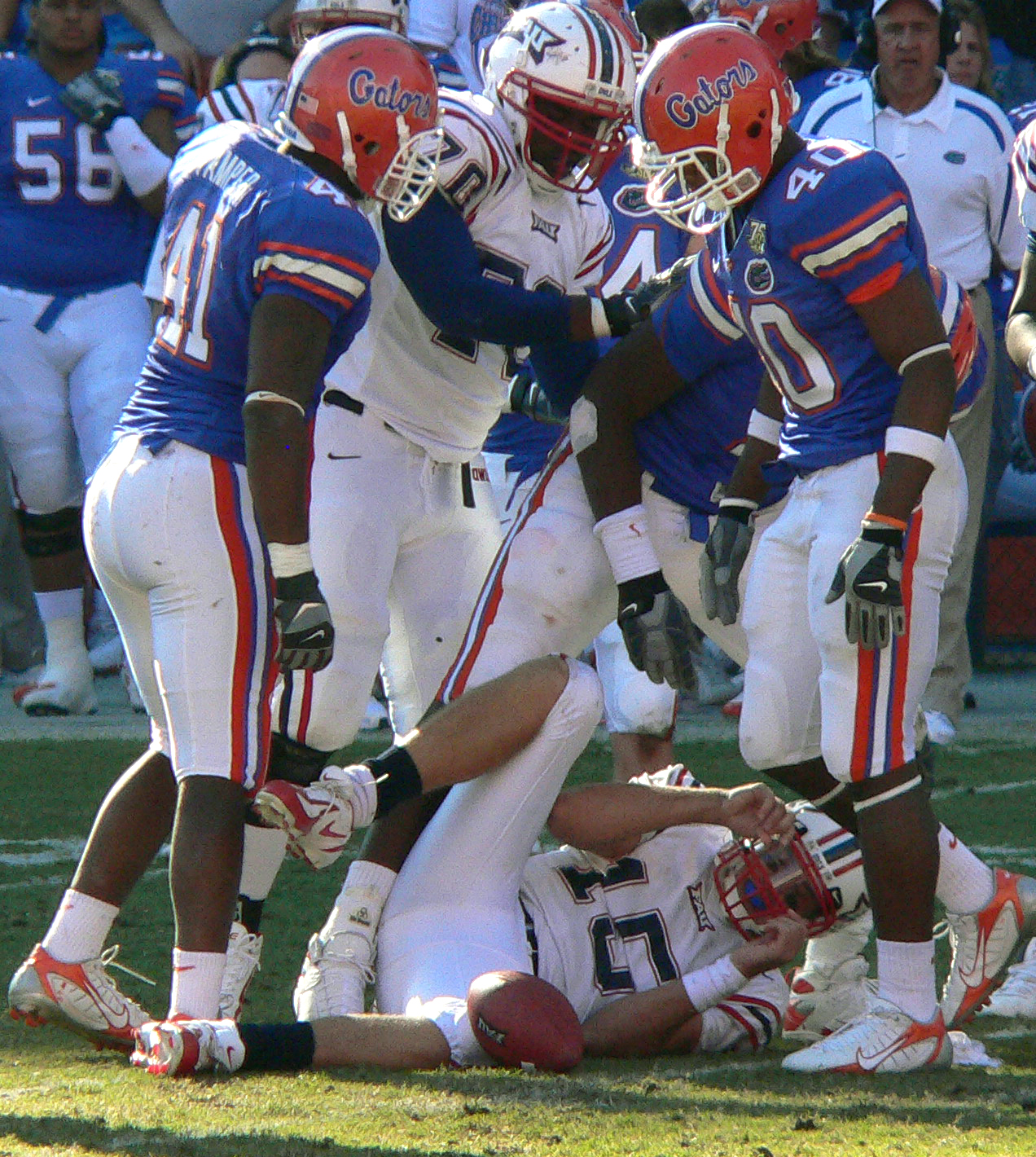
Florida's most common home uniform since 1990

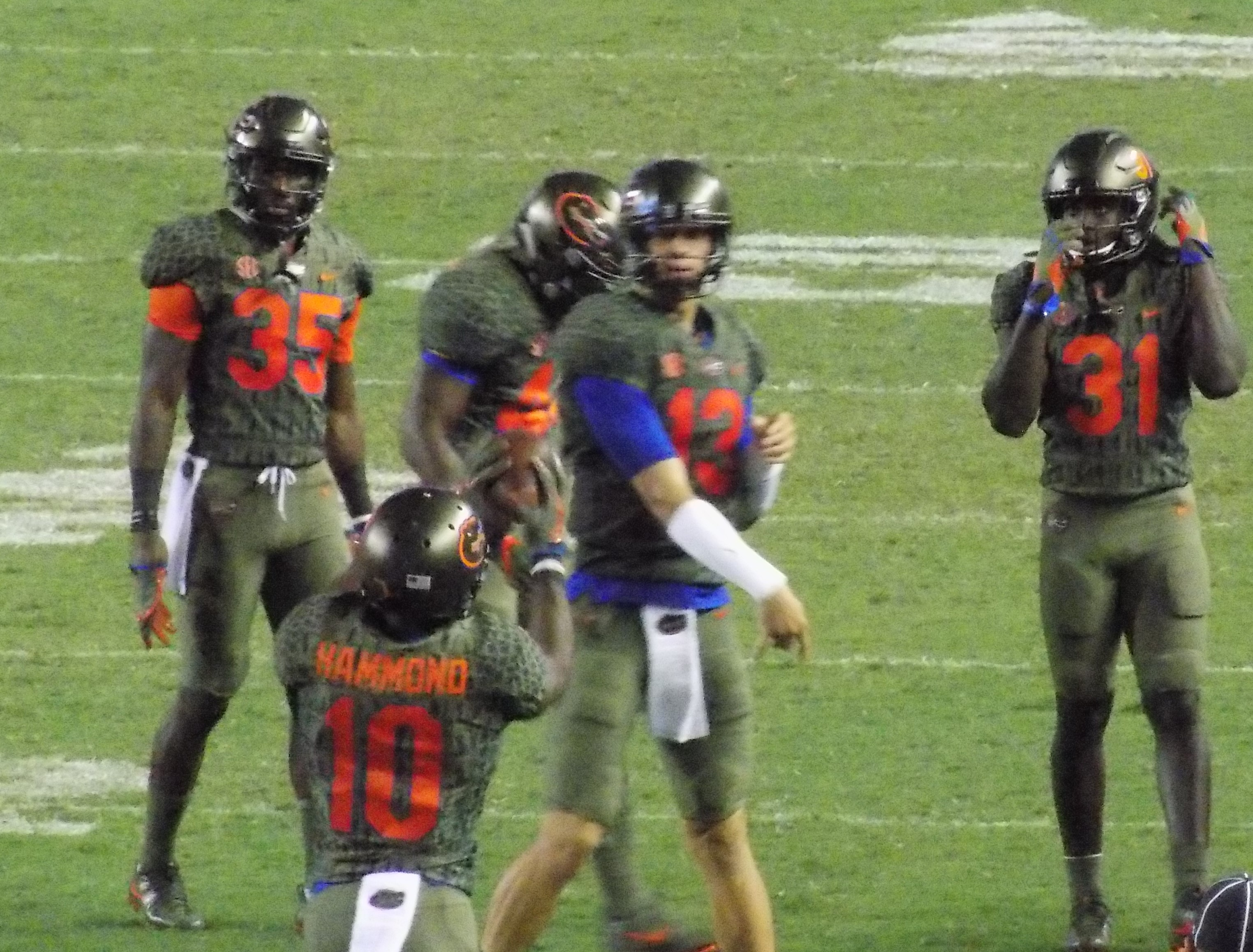
Florida's "Swamp green" alternative uniforms, October 2017

The Florida football team has worn a home uniform of blue jerseys (usually a variation of royal blue) with white pants for most of the program's history. The most notable exception was a decade-long period from 1979 until 1989, when at the suggestion of coach Charley Pell, the Gators switched to orange home jerseys. For road games, Florida wears white jerseys with blue, orange, or white pants, depending on the colors of the opponent or the choice of the players that week.

Steve Spurrier restored the home blue jerseys when he became the Gators' head ball coach in 1990. From 1990 until 2014, Florida's primary home uniforms were blue jerseys with white pants, with blue pants an option for high-profile games, especially at night. Former coach Jim McElwain usually allowed his senior players to decide which uniform combination the team wore for each game. Since this practice began during the 2015 season, the Gators have worn many different combinations of blue or orange jerseys along with blue, orange, or white pants.

Florida has occasionally worn alternative uniforms, which are usually similar to current or former uniforms and used an orange and blue color scheme. One exception were the "swamp green" uniforms used at a home game against Texas A&M in October 2017. These used a dark green theme for the entire uniform from shoes to helmet that was inspired by the appearance of actual alligators. The uniform marked the 25th anniversary of former coach Steve Spurrier introducing the Swamp nickname for Florida Field.

For the first time in program history, Florida debuted an all black uniform on November 4, 2023 in its contest against the Arkansas Razorbacks to honor members of the armed forces, veterans and local first responders. In lieu of their names, each player's nameplate displayed one of five words that are "synonymous with the principles embodied by those who serve." The five words were Commitment, Courage, Excellence, Honor and Integrity.

=== Helmets ===
Florida has had a number of helmet designs, especially early in the program's history. Since the end of the leather helmet era, base colors have alternated between orange, white, and (occasionally) blue, and logos have included the "Gators" script font, an interlocking "UF", a simple "F", and the player number.

From 1979 until 2006, Florida wore orange helmets with a script "Gators" logo in all contests. To commemorate the 100th year of the football program in 2006, the Gators played one game wearing throwback uniforms modeled after their mid-1960s uniforms which included white helmets with a simple "F" logo. In 2009 the Gators participated in Nike's Pro Combat uniform campaign, wearing specially designed blue uniforms and white helmets with a slant-F logo. These uniforms were worn for the last regular-season game against Florida State, and the white helmets were worn again the following week against Alabama in the SEC Championship Game with white jerseys and pants. Florida introduced a different white alternative helmet in 2015 which featured the script "Gators" logo on one side and the slant-F logo on the other, and in 2018 replaced the slant-F with script "Gators" on both sides. In 2017, the Gators wore "swamp green" helmets for one game. These dark green helmets featured a color-altered Gator head logo on one side and the player's number in orange on the other.

For the 2019 homecoming game versus Auburn, Florida wore the same mid-1960s throwback uniforms, including the white helmets with the blue "F" logo within an orange circular outline. The Gators wore the blue helmets for two games in 2020: the tweaked 1960s version with the orange "F" logo within an orange circular outline for their home game against Missouri, and the traditional version with the "Gators" script in orange font for their road game at Tennessee. The team wore the 1960s throwback uniforms again for their 2021 homecoming game versus Vanderbilt, but with orange helmets including the interlocking "UF" logo.

To commemorate the 20th anniversary of the September 11 attacks, the Gators wore white helmets with the red, white, and blue American flag styled "Gators" script for their 2021 road contest at the University of South Florida.

=== Team logos ===
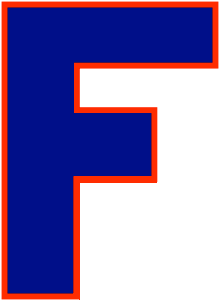
Gator helmet logo during the mid-1960s

Primary helmet logo since 1979

Alternate Florida Athletics logo since the early 2000s

== See also ==
- List of University of Florida Athletic Hall of Fame members
- University Athletic Association
- American football in the United States
- College football
