= William G. Kline =

American sports coach

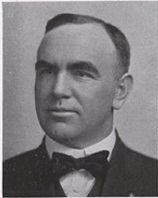
- Kline from 1919 Cornhusker

Biographical details
- Born: June 21, 1882; Salem, Illinois, U.S.
- Died: Unknown

Playing career
- ?–1905: Illinois
- Positions: Halfback (football); Hurdler (track & field)

Coaching career (HC unless noted)

Football
- 1911–1917: Nebraska Wesleyan
- 1918: Nebraska
- 1919: Cotner
- 1920–1922: Florida
- 1926: Hastings

Basketball
- 1911–1918: Nebraska Wesleyan
- 1920–1922: Florida
- 1923–1925: Nebraska

Baseball
- 1912: Nebraska Wesleyan
- 1917: Nebraska Wesleyan
- 1921: Florida
- 1924–1925: Nebraska

Administrative career (AD unless noted)
- 1911–1918: Nebraska Wesleyan
- 1920–1923: Florida

Head coaching record
- Overall: 125–54 (basketball); 37–27 (baseball)

William Gordon Kline (June 21, 1882 – after 1942) was an American college football, baseball and basketball coach. At different times, Kline served as the head coach of the Nebraska Cornhuskers baseball, basketball and football teams, as well as the Florida Gators baseball, basketball and football teams.

== Early life ==
Kline was born in Salem, Illinois in 1882, and graduated from Amboy High School in Amboy, Illinois. He attended the University of Illinois at Urbana-Champaign, where he played halfback for the Illinois Fighting Illini football team and was also a hurdler for the Illini track & field team. He graduated with a Bachelor of Arts degree in literature and arts in 1906.

== Professor, coach and author ==
Kline was a professor at the former Hedding College in Abingdon, Illinois from 1908 to 1911. From 1911 to 1918, he was the athletic director at Nebraska Wesleyan University in Lincoln, Nebraska. He attended law school at the University of Michigan in Ann Arbor, Michigan in 1917, and earned a Bachelor of Laws degree from the University of Nebraska in Lincoln.

In 1918, Kline was a professor at the University of Nebraska, and he became the head coach of the war-time depleted Nebraska Cornhuskers football team. Because of World War I and the 1918 influenza pandemic, the 1918 Huskers did not play their usual Missouri Valley Conference schedule, and, in fact, played the teams from two military training installations. Kline's Huskers posted a 2–3–1 record. The highlight of his season coaching Nebraska came when the Huskers played the Notre Dame Fighting Irish football team to a scoreless tie.

In 1919, Kline was the head football coach at Cotner College in Bethany, Nebraska. From 1919 to 1923, Kline was a law professor at the University of Florida College of Law in Gainesville, Florida, while also serving as the head coach of the Florida Gators football team in 1920, 1921 and 1922. While teaching U.S. Constitutional Law, Federal Procedure and Bankruptcy, and several other commercial law classes, he compiled a 19–8–2 record in three seasons as the Gators football coach. During his time at Florida, he also coached the Gators baseball team for one 4–10 season in 1921, and the Gators basketball team from 1920 to 1922, tallying an overall record in two seasons of 10–11.

In 1923, he returned to the University of Nebraska, where he became the Cornhuskers basketball coach and compiled a 23–12 record in his two seasons there, finishing third and second in the conference standings. In 1924 and 1925, he also coached the Cornhuskers baseball team, and posted an 18–15 record.

Kline wrote several sports-related books, including The All-American Football Coaching Course (1929), The Varsity Football Play Set (1933), The All-America Basketball Coaching Course (1933), and Football for Fans (1934).

== Head coaching record ==
=== Football ===
Year	Team	Overall	Conference	Standing	Bowl/playoffs
Nebraska Wesleyan Coyotes (Independent) (1911–1917)
1911	Nebraska Wesleyan	7–0			
1912	Nebraska Wesleyan	5–2–1			
1913	Nebraska Wesleyan	4–3–1			
1914	Nebraska Wesleyan	7–1			
1915	Nebraska Wesleyan	6–3			
1916	Nebraska Wesleyan	5–4–1			
1917	Nebraska Wesleyan	3–5			
Nebraska Wesleyan:		37–18–3			
Nebraska Cornhuskers (Missouri Valley Intercollegiate Athletic Association) (1918)
1918	Nebraska	2–3–1	0–0		
Nebraska:		2–3–1	0–0		
Cotner Bulldogs (Nebraska Intercollegiate Conference) (1919)
1919	Cotner		2–4	T–5th	
Cotner:			2–4		
Florida Gators (Southern Intercollegiate Athletic Association) (1920–1921)
1920	Florida	6–3	1–3	T–14th	
1921	Florida	6–3–2	4–1–2	6th	
Florida Gators (Southern Conference) (1922)
1922	Florida	7–2	2–0	5th	
Florida:		19–8–2	7–4–2		
Hastings Broncos (Nebraska College Athletic Conference) (1926)
1926	Hastings	4–4	4–3	T–6th	
Hastings:		4–4	4–3		
Total:					

== See also ==
- List of University of Florida faculty and administrators
- List of University of Illinois at Urbana–Champaign people
