= List of Southern Conference football champions =

Southern Conference football champions
- Conference Football Champions
- Southern Conference logo
- Sport: College football
- Conference: Southern Conference
- Played: 1933–present
- Current champion: Mercer (2)
- Most championships: Furman (15)
- TV partner(s): SportSouth; American Sports Network
- Official website: SoConSports.com Football

The list of Southern Conference football champions includes 20 distinct teams that have won the college football championship awarded by the Southern Conference since its creation. In total, forty-one teams have sponsored football in the conference. Only Western Carolina has never won a Southern Conference football championship.

The conference was formed in 1921 when fourteen members from the Southern Intercollegiate Athletic Association (SIAA) met in Atlanta, Georgia with the purpose of creating a workable number of conference games for each member. The Southern Conference is notable for having spawned two other major conferences. In 1933, thirteen schools located south and west of the Appalachians (Alabama, Auburn, Florida, Georgia, Georgia Tech, Kentucky, LSU, Mississippi, Mississippi State, Sewanee, Tennessee, Tulane, and Vanderbilt) departed to form the Southeastern Conference. Twenty years later, in 1953, seven schools (Clemson, Duke, Maryland, North Carolina, North Carolina State, South Carolina, and Wake Forest) withdrew to form the Atlantic Coast Conference.

Currently the conference competes at the National Collegiate Athletic Association (NCAA) Division I level in athletics, with the football teams playing in the Football Championship Subdivision (FCS). There are nine football playing members of the Southern Conference: Chattanooga, The Citadel, East Tennessee State, Furman, Mercer, Samford, Virginia Military Institute, Western Carolina, and Wofford. Southern Conference teams have been successful in the NCAA Division I FCS Playoffs, leading all conferences with an 87–49 (.640) record. Current and former Southern Conference teams have won a total of 12 national championships.

== Champions by year ==
=== Conference Champions: 1922–1981 ===
Year	Team(s)	Conference record	Notes
1922	Georgia Tech; North Carolina; Vanderbilt	4–0; 5–0; 3–0	This was the inaugural Southern Conference football season with 20 teams participating. Vanderbilt was also a member of the SIAA until 1924, and defeated both Sewanee and Mercer. Vanderbilt tied Michigan 0-0 at the dedication of Dudley Field. Auburn upset Centre, previously undefeated in conference play. Vanderbilt end Lynn Bomar and Tech running back Red Barron were unanimous All-Southern and Walter Camp All-America second-team.
1923	Vanderbilt; Washington and Lee	3–0–1; 4–0–1	Florida upset Alabama, previously undefeated in conference play. Board of sportswriters awarded Vanderbilt the Champ Pickens Cup as Southern champions.
1924	Alabama	5–0	Board of sportswriters awarded Alabama the Champ Pickens Cup as Southern champions.
1925	Alabama; Tulane	7–0; 5–0	Alabama wins national championship; the first Southern team to win a Rose Bowl. Board of sportswriters awarded Alabama the Champ Pickens Cup as Southern champions.
1926	Alabama	8–0	Alabama wins national championship. Board of sportswriters awarded Alabama the Champ Pickens Cup as Southern champions.
1927	NC State	4–0	NC State wins conference title with undefeated and untied record.
1928	Georgia Tech	7–0	Georgia Tech finishes No. 3.
1929	Tulane	6–0	
1930	Alabama; Tulane	8–0; 5–0	Alabama wins national championship.
1931	Tulane	8–0	Tulane lost the Rose Bowl to USC.
1932	Auburn; LSU; Tennessee	6–0–1; 4–0; 7–0–1	Thirteen teams leave after this season to form the Southeastern Conference.
1933	Duke; South Carolina	4–0; 3–0	
1934	Washington and Lee	4–0	
1935	Duke	5–0	
1936	Duke	7–0	The Citadel, Furman, George Washington, and Richmond join the Southern Conference.
1937	Maryland	2–0	Virginia leaves the Southern Conference before the start of the 1937 season.
1938	Duke	5–0	
1939	Duke	5–0	
1940	Clemson	4–0	
1941	Duke; South Carolina	5–0; 4-0-1	
1942	William & Mary	5–0	
1943	Duke	4–0	
1944	Duke	4–0	
1945	Duke	4–0	
1946	North Carolina	4–0–1	
1947	William & Mary	7–1	
1948	Clemson	5–0	
1949	North Carolina	5–0	
1950	Washington and Lee	6–0	West Virginia joins the Southern Conference.
1951	Maryland; VMI	5–0	
1952	Duke	5–0	Seven teams leave after this season to form the Atlantic Coast Conference.
1953	West Virginia	4–0	
1954	West Virginia	3–0	
1955	West Virginia	4–0	
1956	West Virginia	5–0	
1957	VMI	6–0	
1958	West Virginia	4–0	Washington and Lee leaves the Southern Conference.
1959	VMI	6–0–1	
1960	VMI	4–1	
1961	The Citadel	5–1	
1962	VMI	6–0	
1963	Virginia Tech	5–0	
1964	West Virginia	5–0	East Carolina joins the Southern Conference.
1965	West Virginia	4–0	Virginia Tech leaves the Southern Conference.
1966	East Carolina; William & Mary	4–1–1	
1967	West Virginia	4–0–1	
1968	Richmond	6–0	West Virginia leaves the Southern Conference.
1969	Davidson; Richmond	5–1	
1970	William & Mary	3–1	George Washington leaves the Southern Conference.
1971	Richmond	5–1	Appalachian State joins the Southern Conference.
1972	East Carolina	7–0	
1973	East Carolina	7–0	
1974	VMI	5–1	
1975	Richmond	5–1	
1976	East Carolina	4–1	Chattanooga, Marshall, and Western Carolina join the Southern Conference. East Carolina and Richmond leave the Southern Conference.
1977	Chattanooga; VMI	4–1	William & Mary leaves the Southern Conference.
1978	Furman; Chattanooga	4–1	Division I splits into I-A and I-AA subdivisions. East Tennessee State joins the Southern Conference.
1979	Chattanooga	5–1	
1980	Furman	7–0	
1981	Furman	5–2	

=== Conference Champions: 1982–present ===
In 1978 Division I football was split into two classifications: the Football Bowl Subdivision (formerly I-A) and Football Championship Subdivision (formerly I-AA). The Southern Conference initially was classified in the upper subdivision, but in 1982, moved to the FCS, where its members compete for the NCAA Division I Football Championship.

Year	Champion(s)	Conference record	Notes
1982	Furman	6–1	Southern Conference drops from I-A to the I-AA classification in football.
1983	Furman	6–0–1	
1984	Chattanooga	5–1	
1985	Furman	6–0	
1986	Appalachian State	6–0–1	
1987	Appalachian State	7–0	
1988	Furman; Marshall	6–1	Furman wins NCAA Division I-AA national championship.
1989	Furman	7–0	
1990	Furman	6–1	
1991	Appalachian State	6–1	Georgia Southern joins the Southern Conference.
1992	The Citadel	6–1	Marshall wins NCAA Division I-AA national championship.
1993	Georgia Southern	7–1	
1994	Marshall	7–1	
1995	Appalachian State	8–0	
1996	Marshall	8–0	Marshall wins NCAA Division I-AA national championship.
1997	Georgia Southern	7–1	Marshall leaves the Southern Conference. Wofford joins the Southern Conference.
1998	Georgia Southern	8–0	
1999	Furman; Georgia Southern; Appalachian State	7–1	Georgia Southern wins NCAA Division I-AA national championship.
2000	Georgia Southern	7–1	Georgia Southern wins NCAA Division I-AA national championship.
2001	Georgia Southern; Furman	7–1	
2002	Georgia Southern	7–1	
2003	Wofford	8–0	Elon joins the Southern Conference. VMI leaves the Southern Conference.
2004	Furman; Georgia Southern	6–1	
2005	Appalachian State	6–1	Appalachian State wins NCAA Division I-AA national championship. East Tennessee State leaves the Southern Conference.
2006	Appalachian State	7–0	Appalachian State wins NCAA Division I FCS national championship.
2007	Wofford; Appalachian State	5–2	Appalachian State wins NCAA Division I FCS national championship.
2008	Appalachian State	8–0	Samford joins the Southern Conference.
2009	Appalachian State	8–0	
2010	Appalachian State; Wofford	7–1	
2011	Georgia Southern	7–1	
2012	Appalachian State; Georgia Southern; Wofford	6–2	
2013	Furman; Chattanooga; Samford	6–2	Appalachian State, Elon, and Georgia Southern leave the Southern Conference.
2014	Chattanooga	7–0	Mercer joins the Southern Conference. East Tennessee State and VMI rejoin the Southern Conference. East Tennessee State to resume football in 2015.
2015	Chattanooga; The Citadel	6–1	East Tennessee State plays as FCS independent in first year of program return.
2016	The Citadel	8–0	East Tennessee State rejoins conference in football.
2017	Wofford	7–1	
2018	East Tennessee State; Wofford; Furman	6–2	
2019	Wofford	7–1	
2020	VMI	6–1	Due to the COVID-19 pandemic, the 2020 conference season was conducted from February 20 - April 17, 2021.
2021	East Tennessee State	7–1	
2022	Samford	8–0	
2023	Furman	7–1	
2024	Mercer	7–1	
2025	Mercer	8–0	
2026	Mercer	7–1	

== Championships by team ==
School	Championships	Years
Furman	15	2023, 2018, 2013, 2004, 2001, 1999, 1990, 1989, 1988, 1985, 1983, 1982, 1981, 1980, 1978
Duke†	10	1952, 1945, 1944, 1943, 1941, 1939, 1938, 1936, 1935, 1933
VMI	8	2020, 1977, 1974, 1962, 1960, 1959, 1957, 1951
West Virginia†	8	1967, 1965, 1964, 1958, 1956, 1955, 1954, 1953
Chattanooga	7	2015, 2014, 2013, 1984, 1979, 1978, 1977
Wofford	7	2019, 2018, 2017, 2012, 2010, 2007, 2003
Alabama†	4	1930, 1926, 1925, 1924
The Citadel	4	2016, 2015, 1992, 1961
East Carolina†	4	1976, 1973, 1972, 1966
Richmond†	4	1975, 1971, 1969, 1968
Tulane†	4	1931, 1930, 1929, 1925
William & Mary†	4	1970, 1966, 1947, 1942
Mercer	3	2026, 2025, 2024
North Carolina†	3	1949, 1946, 1922
Washington and Lee†	3	1950, 1934, 1923
East Tennessee State	2	2021, 2018
Samford	2	2022, 2013
Clemson†	2	1948, 1940
Georgia Tech†	2	1928, 1922
Maryland†	2	1951, 1937
South Carolina†	2	1941, 1933
Vanderbilt†	2	1923, 1922
Auburn†	1	1932
Davidson†	1	1969
LSU†	1	1932
NC State†	1	1927
Tennessee†	1	1932
Virginia Tech†	1	1963

Former members' rows are shaded and have a † symbol.
