= 1923 Alabama Crimson Tide football team =

American college football season

1923 Alabama Crimson Tide football
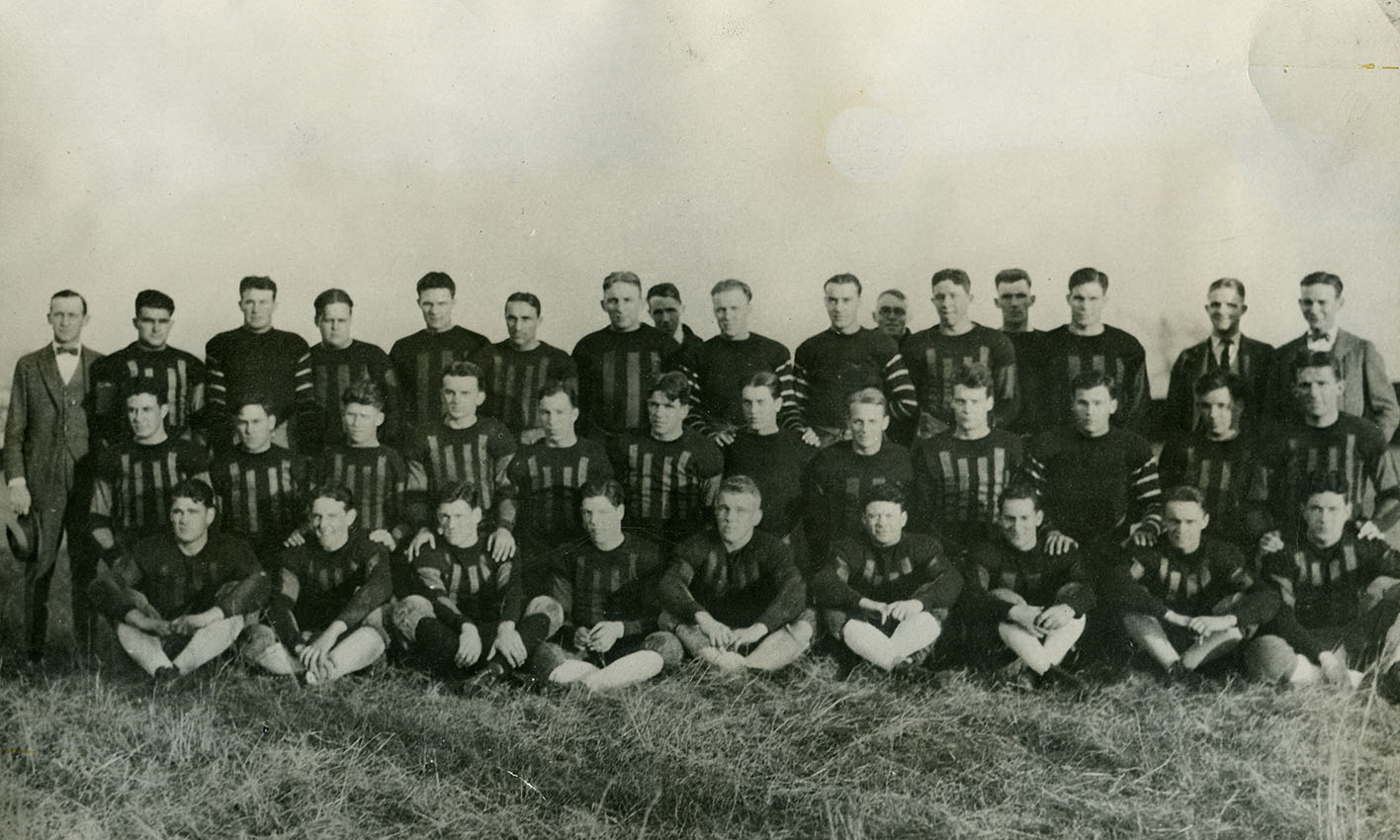
- Conference: Southern Conference
- Record: 7–2–1 (4–1–1 SoCon)
- Head coach: Wallace Wade (1st season)
- Offensive scheme: Single-wing
- Captain: Al Clemens
- Home stadium: Denny Field; Rickwood Field; Cramton Bowl

Uniform
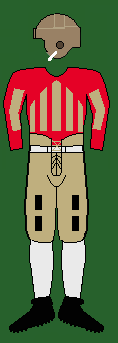

1923 Southern Conference football standings
	Conf.					Overall
Team	W		L		T	W		L		T
Washington & Lee +	4	–	0	–	1	6	–	3	–	1
Vanderbilt * +	3	–	0	–	1	5	–	2	–	1
VPI	4	–	1	–	0	6	–	3	–	0
Alabama	4	–	1	–	1	7	–	2	–	1
Maryland	2	–	1	–	0	7	–	2	–	1
Florida	1	–	0	–	2	6	–	1	–	2
North Carolina	2	–	1	–	1	5	–	3	–	1
Georgia	3	–	2	–	0	5	–	3	–	1
Mississippi A&M	2	–	1	–	2	5	–	2	–	2
Tennessee	4	–	3	–	0	5	–	4	–	1
Tulane	2	–	2	–	1	6	–	3	–	1
Clemson	1	–	1	–	1	5	–	2	–	1
Georgia Tech	0	–	0	–	4	3	–	2	–	4
NC State	1	–	4	–	0	3	–	7	–	0
Auburn	0	–	1	–	3	3	–	3	–	3
Kentucky	0	–	2	–	2	4	–	3	–	2
Virginia	0	–	3	–	1	3	–	5	–	1
LSU	0	–	3	–	0	3	–	5	–	1
Ole Miss	0	–	4	–	0	4	–	6	–	0
South Carolina	0	–	4	–	0	4	–	6	–	0
+ – Conference co-champions; * co-member of SIAA

The 1923 Alabama Crimson Tide football team (variously "Alabama", "UA" or "Bama") represented the University of Alabama in the 1923 Southern Conference football season. It was the Crimson Tide's 30th overall and 2nd season as a member of the Southern Conference (SoCon). The team was led by head coach Wallace Wade, in his first year, and played their home games at Denny Field in Tuscaloosa, at Rickwood Field in Birmingham and at the Cramton Bowl in Montgomery, Alabama. They finished the season with a record of seven wins, two losses and one tie (7–2–1 overall, 4–1–1 in the SoCon).

1923 marked the first season for new head coach Wallace Wade, a former assistant at Vanderbilt. One year after Alabama's triumphal trip to Penn, the Tide went on another northeast roadtrip with a different outcome, losing to Syracuse 23–0. Against Georgia Tech, Alabama was very lucky to escape with a 0–0 tie. After defeating Georgia, the Tide was the favorite for a Southern title. A season-ending, 16–6 upset loss to coach James Van Fleet's Florida Gators cost coach Wade and the Tide the Southern Conference championship.

== Schedule ==
Date	Opponent	Site	Result	Attendance	Source
September 29	Union (TN)*	Denny Field; Tuscaloosa, AL	W 12–0		
October 6	Ole Miss	Denny Field; Tuscaloosa, AL (rivalry)	W 56–0		
October 13	at Syracuse*	Archbold Stadium; Syracuse, NY	L 0–23	9,000	
October 20	Sewanee*	Rickwood Field; Birmingham, AL	W 7–0	10,000	
October 27	at Spring Hill*	Monroe Park; Mobile, AL	W 59–0	2,600	
November 3	at Georgia Tech	Grant Field; Atlanta, GA (rivalry)	T 0–0	10,000	
November 10	Kentucky^{†}	Denny Field; Tuscaloosa, AL	W 16–8	7,000–8,000	
November 16	LSU	Cramton Bowl; Montgomery, AL (rivalry)	W 30–3		
November 24	Georgia	Cramton Bowl; Montgomery, AL (rivalry)	W 36–0		
November 29	Florida	Rickwood Field; Birmingham, AL (rivalry)	L 6–16	10,000	
*Non-conference game; ^{†}Homecoming

== Before the season ==
On November 6, 1922, Alabama head coach Xen C. Scott announced his resignation as head coach of the Crimson Tide as a result of his deteriorating health. On December 16, 1922, the University Athletic Council announced that Vanderbilt athletic director and assistant football coach Wallace Wade had been hired to serve as both head football coach and athletic director at Alabama. On the hiring, the Athletic Council stated:

Mr. Wade's experience as a football coach has been brilliant and successful. He comes to us with the highest recommendation not only from Vanderbilt and Brown authorities, but also from many of the leading football experts of the South and indeed the entire country. If we rely on expert testimony, the University is fortunate securing a man of Mr. Wade's character, experience, and achievements."

Prior to his being hired at Alabama, Kentucky also bid for his services as head coach of the Wildcats. After Kentucky kept Wade too long at a meeting, Alabama hired him, and Wade then vowed he would never lose a game to Kentucky.

== Game summaries ==
=== Union (TN) ===
Week 1: Union at Alabama

Team	1	2	3	4	Total
Union	0	0	0	0	0
• Alabama	0	0	0	12	12

- Date: September 29
- Location: Denny Field
  Tuscaloosa, AL
- Referee: Stricker Coles

Alabama opened their 1923 season against Union University at Denny Field, and defeated the Bulldogs 12–0 in what was Wallace Wade's first game as head coach of the Crimson Tide. In a game dominated by both defenses, Alabama did not score any points until the fourth quarter. Pooley Hubert scored first on a one-yard run and was followed by a six-yard Allen Graham MacCartee touchdown pass to Ben Hudson with only 00:15 left in the game.

The starting lineup was Al Clemens (left end), Bill Buckler (left tackle), Pete Camp (left guard), Clyde Propst (center), Bruce Jones (right guard), Ben E. Compton (right tackle), Ben Hudson (right end), Graham McClintock (quarterback), Red Barnes (left halfback), Johnny Mack Brown (right halfback), Pooley Hubert (fullback).

=== Ole Miss ===
Week 2: Ole Miss at Alabama

Team	1	2	3	4	Total
Ole Miss	0	0	0	0	0
• Alabama	14	14	28	0	56

- Date: October 6
- Location: Denny Field
  Tuscaloosa, AL
- Referee: Morfarity (St. Mary's)

Alabama opened conference play against Ole Miss, and defeated the Rebels 56–0 at Denny Field. The Crimson Tide scored eight touchdowns in the contest. In addition to Pete Camp scoring a pair after he recovered blocked Rebels kicks in the end zone, touchdowns were also scored twice by Red Barnes and one each by Ben Hudson, Pooley Hubert, Allen MacCartee and Johnny Mack Brown.

The starting lineup was Al Clemens (left end), Bill Buckler (left tackle), Jack Langhorne (left guard), Clyde Propst (center), Pete Camp (right guard), Ben E. Compton (right tackle), Ben Hudson (right end), Grant Gillis (quarterback), Red Barnes (left halfback), Johnny Mack Brown (right halfback), Pooley Hubert (fullback).

=== Syracuse ===
Week 3: Alabama at Syracuse

Team	1	2	3	4	Total
Alabama	0	0	0	0	0
• Syracuse	3	0	6	14	23

- Date: October 13
- Location: Archbold Stadium
  Syracuse, NY
- Referee: E. J. O'Brien

For their third game, Alabama played an intersectional contest at Syracuse University, and were defeated by the Orangemen 23–0 at Archbold Stadium. Syracuse took a 3–0 lead in the first quarter behind a 15-yard John McBride field goal. The Orangemen extended their lead in the third to 9–0 after Evander MacRae recovered a fumble and returned it 35-yards for a touchdown. Syracuse then closed the game with a pair of fourth quarter touchdowns on a 65-yard punt return by Chester Bowman on a McBride run.

The starting lineup was Al Clemens (left end), Bill Buckler (left tackle), Jack Langhorne (left guard), Clyde Propst (center), Pete Camp (right guard), Ben E. Compton (right tackle), Ben Hudson (right end), Grant Gillis (quarterback), Red Barnes (left halfback), Johnny Mack Brown (right halfback), Pooley Hubert (fullback).

=== Sewanee ===
Week 4: Sewanee at Alabama

Team	1	2	3	4	Total
Sewanee	0	0	0	0	0
• Alabama	0	0	0	7	7

- Date: October 20
- Location: Rickwood Field
  Birmingham, AL
- Game attendance: 10,000
- Referee: Branch Bocock

A week after their first loss of the season, Alabama defeated the Sewanee Tigers 7–0 at Rickwood Field. The game was a defensive struggle with neither team scoring until late in the fourth quarter. With under two minutes left in the contest, Johnny Mack Brown intercepted a Tiger pass and returned it to their 48-yard line. Pooley Hubert then led Alabama down the field and scored the game-winning touchdown on a short run. Sewanee had time to run only two plays before the game ended.

The starting lineup was Al Clemens (left end), Bill Buckler (left tackle), Bruce Jones (left guard), Clyde Propst (center), Pete Camp (right guard), Ben E. Compton (right tackle), Hulet Whitaker (right end), Grant Gillis (quarterback), Country Oliver (left halfback), Allen MacCartee (right halfback), Pooley Hubert (fullback).

=== Spring Hill ===
Before 2,600 fans at Monroe Park at Mobile, the Crimson Tide shutout the Spring Hill Badgers 59–0. In the Game Alabama touchdowns were made by Hubert (3), Barnes (2), Hudson, Baty, Gillis, and Cohen.

The starting lineup was Al Clemens (left end), Bill Buckler (left tackle), Bruce Jones (left guard), Clyde Propst (center), Pete Camp (right guard), Ben E. Compton (right tackle), Hulet Whitaker (right end), Grant Gillis (quarterback), Red Barnes (left halfback), W. S. Oliver (right halfback), Pooley Hubert (fullback).

=== Georgia Tech ===
Week 6: Alabama at Georgia Tech

Team	1	2	3	4	Total
Alabama	0	0	0	0	0
Georgia Tech	0	0	0	0	0

- Date: November 3
- Location: Grant Field
  Atlanta, GA
- Game attendance: 10,000
- Game weather: Rain
- Referee: Springer

In a driving rain, Georgia Tech and Alabama played to a scoreless tie, "one of the weirdest games ever seen on a football field." Tech had 18 first downs to none for Alabama, and the Tide never advanced the ball beyond its own 27-yard line. Sixteen punts from Grant Gillis helped Bama to hold Tech scoreless, and Tech drives stalled on the Alabama 2, 8, and 11-yard lines. The Golden Tornado also missed on the lone field goal attempt by H. L. Reeves from 45 yards out.

The starting lineup was Al Clemens (left end), Bill Buckler (left tackle), Bruce Jones (left guard), Clyde Propst (center), Pete Camp (right guard), Ben E. Compton (right tackle), Hulet Whitaker (right end), Grant Gillis (quarterback), Red Barnes (left halfback), William Baty (right halfback), Pooley Hubert (fullback).

=== Kentucky ===
Week 7: Kentucky at Alabama

Team	1	2	3	4	Total
Kentucky	0	0	0	8	8
• Alabama	9	0	0	7	16

- Date: November 10
- Location: Denny Field
  Tuscaloosa, AL
- Game attendance: 7,000–8,000
- Referee: Kittleman (Wisconsin)

On homecoming at Tuscaloosa, a 16–8 victory over Kentucky saw a late surge by the Wildcats. Alabama scored first when Ben Compton kicked a 33-yard field goal. Pooley Hubert bucked over for a touchdown later in the first period after a 30-yard, end run by Grant Gillis that made the score 9–0.

In the fourth quarter, Gillis intercepted a pass which led to his one-yard touchdown on the subsequent play that extended the Alabama lead to 16–0. Later in the quarter, Kentucky scored their only touchdown on a 60-yard Len Tracy run that cut the Alabama lead to 16–6. The final margin of 16–8 resulted after Graham McClintock was tackled for a safety after a bad snap on a punt attempt.

The starting lineup was Al Clemens (left end), Bill Buckler (left tackle), Jack Langhorne (left guard), Clyde Propst (center), Pete Camp (right guard), Ben E. Compton (right tackle), Newton (right end), Allen McCartee (quarterback), Red Barnes (left halfback), William Baty (right halfback), Pooley Hubert (fullback).

=== LSU ===
Week 8: LSU at Alabama

Team	1	2	3	4	Total
LSU	3	0	0	0	3
• Alabama	9	7	7	7	30

- Date: November 16
- Location: Cramton Bowl
  Montgomery, AL
- Referee: Stricker Coles

On a Friday evening at the Cramton Bowl, Alabama defeated LSU under first-year head coach Mike Donahue by a 30–3 score. LSU scored their only points on a first quarter, 27-yard field goal from William Pitcher. Alabama responded with a 20-yard Ben Compton field goal on the drive that ensured and tied the game 3–3. Later in the quarter, a Pitcher fumble was recovered by Ben Compton for a touchdown and 9–3 Crimson Tide lead. Alabama extended their lead to 16–3 at the half after Tom Newton intercepted a LSU pass and returned it 40-yard for a touchdown.

In the third quarter, a Pooley Hubert interception led to his two-yard touchdown run on the drive that ensued for a 23–3 lead. William Baty then made the final score 30–3 with his short touchdown run late in the fourth quarter. Of note, the game marked the first since their 1920 season that Al Clemens was not in the starting lineup for Alabama.

The starting lineup was Hulet Whitaker (left end), Jack Langhorne (left tackle), Bruce Jones (left guard), Clyde Propst (center), Pete Camp (right guard), Tom Newton (right end), Grant Gillis (quarterback), Allen McCartee (left halfback), William Baty (right halfback), Pooley Hubert (fullback).

=== Georgia ===
Week 9: Georgia at Alabama

Team	1	2	3	4	Total
Georgia	0	0	0	0	0
• Alabama	0	10	7	19	36

- Date: November 24
- Location: Cramton Bowl
  Montgomery, AL
- Referee: Springer (Penn)

At the Cramton Bowl for their second consecutive game, Alabama defeated the Georgia Bulldogs 36–0 and were dubbed unofficial Southern champions. After a scoreless first quarter, Alabama scored their first points on a 50-yard Allen McCartee touchdown pass to Grant Gillis for a 7–0 lead. They extended their halftime lead to 10–0 behind a 25-yard Ben Compton field goal.

Alabama's third-quarter touchdown was set up after Clyde Propst recovered a Georgia fumble deep in Bulldog territory. Two plays later, Pooley Hubert scored on a short run for a 17–0 Crimson Tide lead. Alabama closed the game with a trio of fourth quarter touchdowns for the 36–0 victory. The first came on a Red Barnes run, a Propst interception return and on a blocked punt recovered by Hulet Whitaker for the final points of the game.

The starting lineup was Al Clemens (left end), Bill Buckler (left tackle), Bruce Jones (left guard), Clyde Propst (center), Pete Camp (right guard), Jack Langhorne (right tackle), Tom Newton (right end), Grant Gillis (quarterback), Allen McCartee (left halfback), William Baty (right halfback), Pooley Hubert (fullback).

=== Florida ===
Week 10: Florida at Alabama

Team	1	2	3	4	Total
• Florida	0	0	9	7	16
Alabama	0	6	0	0	6

- Date: November 29
- Location: Rickwood Field
  Birmingham, AL
- Game attendance: 10,000
- Game weather: Rain

On a muddy field with pools of water, the Florida Gators upset the Tide with a comeback, 16–6 victory on Thanksgiving Day, putting the Florida program in the national spotlight for the first time. The upset gave Wade's previous school of Vanderbilt the SoCon title. In an attempt to drum up publicity, Champ Pickens photographed a stuffed alligator and drew tiny Crimsons swarming around it.

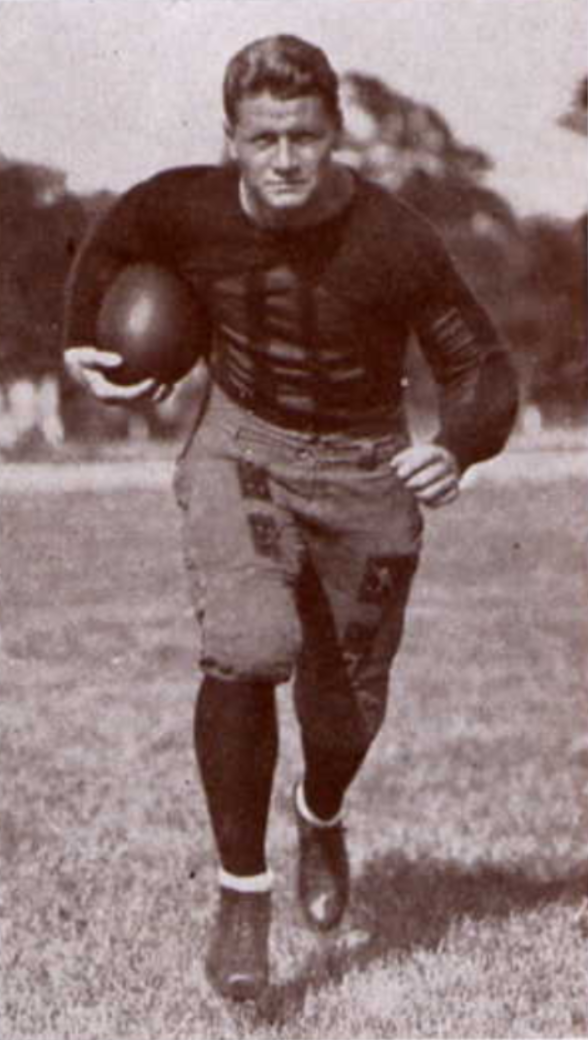
Florida's Edgar C. Jones.

Florida back Edgar C. Jones scored all of his team's points. The Gator scores by Jones came on runs of 10 yards around right end, a 12-yard place kick, and a 20-yard run around right end. The punting of Ark Newton and the line play of captain Robbie Robinson (in his final game) and Goldy Goldstein also helped the Gators get the victory.

In the first half, Alabama's Grant Gillis won the punting battle and Florida was on the defensive, turning back multiple scoring threats from inside the 10-yard line. Pooley Hubert scored first. The Gators eschewed their stockings in the second half, due to the rain and mud, and waited until the last minute to come out for the kickoff, while Alabama was already lined up. Because of this maneuver, Wade never spoke to coach Van Fleet again.

A few minutes into the second half, Newton complete a 12-yard pass to Dick Brown, down at Alabama's 20-yard line. Brown went around left end for 9 yards; then Jones went around right end for 10 yards and the tying touchdown. Newton missed the extra point. Moments later Newton kicked a punt of 60 yards, from his own 20-yard line to the same of Alabama's. Gillis botched the ensuing Alabama punt. Bill Middlekauff ran behind left guard twice, and Newton ran behind right tackle once, netting 8 yards in three plays. From the 12-yard line, Jones converted a placekick. Newton continued to punt well, and attempted a 53-yard field goal which barely missed. He also tried a 60-yard field goal which was blocked, recovered by Florida's Joe Merrin on Alabama's 20-yard line. Runs at the line failed, and Jones went around right end for 20 yards and the final touchdown.

== Postseason ==
After much controversy over whom to give the Champ Pickens Trophy, it was awarded to Vanderbilt over Florida.

== Personnel ==
=== Varsity letter winners ===
==== Line ====
Player	Hometown	Position	Games started	Prep school	Height	Weight	Age
Bill Buckler	Saint Paul, Minnesota	Guard	4				
Joseph "Pete" Camp	Manchester, Alabama	Tackle	4				
Al Clemens	Scottsboro, Alabama	End	4				
Ben E. Compton	Greensboro, Alabama	Guard	4				
Ernest Cooper	St. Stephens, Alabama	Tackle					
Elmer Wilbur Dany	Cleveland, Ohio	End					
Ben Hudson	Montgomery, Alabama	End	3				
Bruce Jones	Jasper, Alabama	Guard	2				
Jack Langhorne	Uniontown, Alabama	Tackle	2				
Graham McClintock	Laurel, Mississippi	End/Back	1				
Clyde "Shorty" Propst	Ohatchee, Alabama	Center	4				

==== Backfield ====
Player	Hometown	Position	Games started	Prep school	Height	Weight	Age
William C. Baty	Bessemer, Alabama	Halfback					
Johnny Mack Brown	Dothan, Alabama	Halfback	3	Dothan High	5'11"	160	19
Andy Cohen	El Paso, Texas	Back			5'8"	155	19
Grant Gillis	Grove Hill, Alabama	Quarterback	3		5'10	165	22
Robert Poole Hinton	Uniontown, Alabama	Back					
Allison "Pooley" Hubert	Meridian, Mississippi	Fullback	4	Meridian High	5'10"	190	22
Allen Graham MacCartee	Washington, D.C.	Halfback	1				
W. S. "Country" Oliver	Panola, Alabama	Back/Tackle	1				
L. O. Wesley	Guin, Alabama	Quarterback					

==== Other ====
Name	Hometown	Position
Clifford Inglis		Manager

=== Coaching staff ===
Name	Position	Seasons at Alabama	Alma Mater
Wallace Wade	Head coach	1	Brown (1917)
Hank Crisp	Assistant coach	3	VPI (1920)
Russell Cohen	Assistant coach	1	Vanderbilt (1916)
William T. Van de Graaff	Assistant coach	3	Alabama (1916)
