= Southern Conference Championship =

Southern Conference Championship or Southern Conference Tournament may refer to:

- List of Southern Conference football champions, the college football champions
- List of Southern Conference men's basketball champions, the men's basketball champions of tournament and regular season
- Southern Conference baseball tournament, the baseball championship tournament
