= 1923 Kentucky Wildcats football team =

American college football season

1923 Kentucky Wildcats football
- Conference: Southern Conference
- Record: 4–3–2 (0–2–2 SoCon)
- Head coach: Jack Winn (1st season)
- Captain: Dell Ramsey
- Home stadium: Stoll Field

1923 Southern Conference football standings
	Conf.					Overall
Team	W		L		T	W		L		T
Washington & Lee +	4	–	0	–	1	6	–	3	–	1
Vanderbilt * +	3	–	0	–	1	5	–	2	–	1
VPI	4	–	1	–	0	6	–	3	–	0
Alabama	4	–	1	–	1	7	–	2	–	1
Maryland	2	–	1	–	0	7	–	2	–	1
Florida	1	–	0	–	2	6	–	1	–	2
North Carolina	2	–	1	–	1	5	–	3	–	1
Georgia	3	–	2	–	0	5	–	3	–	1
Mississippi A&M	2	–	1	–	2	5	–	2	–	2
Tennessee	4	–	3	–	0	5	–	4	–	1
Tulane	2	–	2	–	1	6	–	3	–	1
Clemson	1	–	1	–	1	5	–	2	–	1
Georgia Tech	0	–	0	–	4	3	–	2	–	4
NC State	1	–	4	–	0	3	–	7	–	0
Auburn	0	–	1	–	3	3	–	3	–	3
Kentucky	0	–	2	–	2	4	–	3	–	2
Virginia	0	–	3	–	1	3	–	5	–	1
LSU	0	–	3	–	0	3	–	5	–	1
Ole Miss	0	–	4	–	0	4	–	6	–	0
South Carolina	0	–	4	–	0	4	–	6	–	0
+ – Conference co-champions; * co-member of SIAA

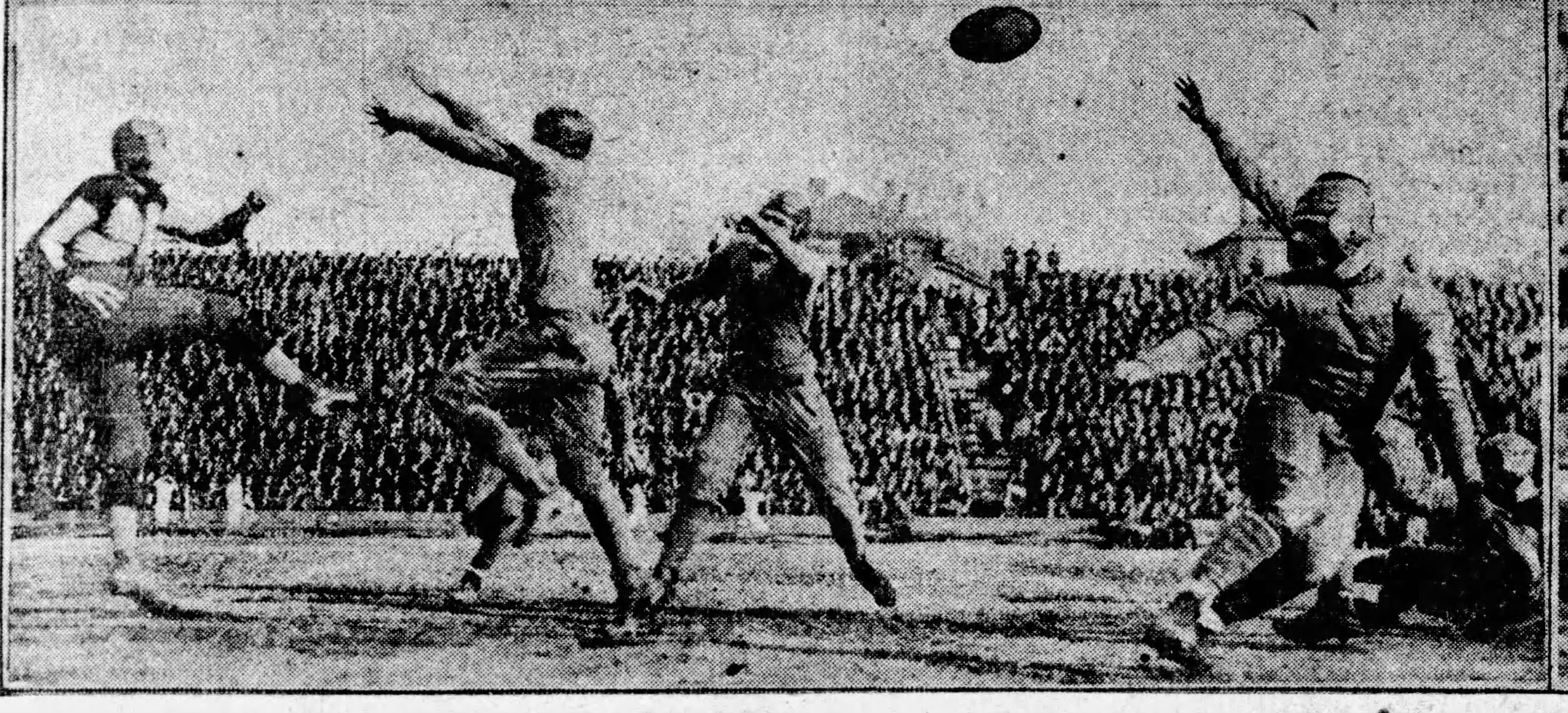

The 1923 Kentucky Wildcats football team was an American football team that represented the University of Kentucky as a member of the Southern Conference (SoCon) during the 1923 college football season. Led by Jack Winn in his first and only season as head coach, the team compiled an overall record of 4–3–2 with a mark of 0–2–2 in conference play, placing 17th in the SoCon.

== Schedule ==
Date	Time	Opponent	Site	Result	Attendance	Source
September 29		Marshall*	Stoll Field; Lexington, KY	W 41–0		
October 6	2:30 p.m.	at Cincinnati*	Carson Field; Cincinnati, OH	W 14–0		
October 13		Washington and Lee	Stoll Field; Lexington, KY	T 6–6		
October 20		Maryville (TN)*	Stoll Field; Lexington, KY	W 28–0		
October 27		Georgetown (KY)*	Stoll Field; Lexington, KY	W 35–0		
November 3		at Centre*	Cheek Field; Danville, KY (rivalry)	L 0–10	12,000	
November 10		at Alabama	Denny Field; Tuscaloosa, AL	L 8–16	7,000–8,000	
November 17		at Georgia Tech	Grant Field; Atlanta, GA	T 3–3		
November 29		Tennessee	Stoll Field; Lexington, KY	L 0–18		
*Non-conference game; All times are in Eastern time
