= Jack Winn =

American football player, coach, and circuit judge

Biographical details
- Born: February 7, 1898
- Died: February 16, 1974; Mount Sterling, Kentucky, U.S.

Playing career
- 1917: Princeton

Coaching career (HC unless noted)
- 1920: Princeton (ends)
- 1922: Kentucky (line)
- 1923: Kentucky
- 1932: Transylvania
- 1943: Wright Field (assistant)

Head coaching record
- Overall: 7–8–3

John Jacob Winn (February 7, 1898 – February 16, 1974) was an American college football player and coach and circuit judge. He served as the head football coach at the University of Kentucky for one season in 1923, compiling a record of 4–3–2. Winn graduated from Princeton University in 1918. He played football there and was captain of the 1917 Princeton Tigers football team. He was the ends coach at his alma mater in 1920. Winn joined the Kentucky Wildcats football team in 1922 as a line coach under William Juneau. Winn served as a lieutenant in the United States Army Air Forces during World War II and was an assistant coach for the 1943 Wright Field Kittyhawks football team.

== Head coaching record ==
Year	Team	Overall	Conference	Standing	Bowl/playoffs
Kentucky Wildcats (Southern Conference) (1923)
1923	Kentucky	4–3–2	0–2–2	17th	
Kentucky:		4–3–2	0–2–2		
Transylvania Pioneers (Southern Intercollegiate Athletic Association) (1932)
1932	Transylvania	3–5–1	1–3–1	T–19th	
Transylvania:		3–5–1	1–3–1		
Total:		7–8–3			
