= Champ Pickens =

Football expert

- Pickens in 1958
- Born: May 31, 1877
- Died: September 18, 1963 (aged 86)
- Known for: Namesake of Champ Pickens Cup; Manager of 1896 Alabama team Coined Alabama's "Million Dollar Band"; Founded Blue–Gray Football Classic

William C. "Champ" Pickens (May 31, 1877 – September 18, 1963) was a prominent figure in Alabama and Southern football, the namesake of the Champ Pickens Cup awarded to the winner of the Southern Conference from 1923 to 1926. Pickens developed the idea for the Blue–Gray Football Classic, played between stars of the South versus the North from 1939 to 2003. He gave Alabama's band its name of the "Million Dollar Band." He wrote two of the earliest books on Alabama football. Pickens was manager of the 1896 Alabama team.

== Million Dollar Band ==
Pickens bestowed the name "Million Dollar Band" after the 1922 football game against Georgia Tech. Though accounts vary, it is reported that in order for the band to attend the game they had to solicit funds from local businesses. They were able to collect enough funds to ride in a tourist sleeper to the game. After the game, which Alabama lost 33–7, an Atlanta sportswriter commented to Pickens, "You don't have much of a team; what do you have at Alabama?" Pickens replied, "A Million Dollar Band."
