= 1923 Mississippi A&M Aggies football team =

American college football season

1923 Mississippi A&M Aggies football
- Conference: Southern Conference
- Record: 5–2–2 (2–1–2 SoCon)
- Head coach: Earl Abell (1st season)
- Home stadium: Scott Field

1923 Southern Conference football standings
	Conf.					Overall
Team	W		L		T	W		L		T
Washington & Lee +	4	–	0	–	1	6	–	3	–	1
Vanderbilt * +	3	–	0	–	1	5	–	2	–	1
VPI	4	–	1	–	0	6	–	3	–	0
Alabama	4	–	1	–	1	7	–	2	–	1
Maryland	2	–	1	–	0	7	–	2	–	1
Florida	1	–	0	–	2	6	–	1	–	2
North Carolina	2	–	1	–	1	5	–	3	–	1
Georgia	3	–	2	–	0	5	–	3	–	1
Mississippi A&M	2	–	1	–	2	5	–	2	–	2
Tennessee	4	–	3	–	0	5	–	4	–	1
Tulane	2	–	2	–	1	6	–	3	–	1
Clemson	1	–	1	–	1	5	–	2	–	1
Georgia Tech	0	–	0	–	4	3	–	2	–	4
NC State	1	–	4	–	0	3	–	7	–	0
Auburn	0	–	1	–	3	3	–	3	–	3
Kentucky	0	–	2	–	2	4	–	3	–	2
Virginia	0	–	3	–	1	3	–	5	–	1
LSU	0	–	3	–	0	3	–	5	–	1
Ole Miss	0	–	4	–	0	4	–	6	–	0
South Carolina	0	–	4	–	0	4	–	6	–	0
+ – Conference co-champions; * co-member of SIAA

The 1923 Mississippi A&M Aggies football team was an American football team that represented the Agricultural and Mechanical College of the State of Mississippi (now known as Mississippi State University) as a member of the Southern Conference (SoCon) during the 1923 college football season. In their first season under head coach Earl Abell, Mississippi A&M compiled a 5–2–2 record.

== Schedule ==
Date	Opponent	Site	Result	Attendance	Source
October 6	Millsaps*	Scott Field; Starkville, MS	W 28–6		
October 13	Ouachita Baptist*	Scott Field; Starkville, MS	W 6–0		
October 20	vs. Ole Miss	State Fairgrounds; Jackson, MS (rivalry)	W 13–6	8,000	
October 27	vs. Tennessee	Russwood Park; Memphis, TN	L 3–7		
November 3	at Vanderbilt	Dudley Field; Nashville, TN	T 0–0		
November 10	Union (TN)*	Scott Field; Starkville, MS	W 6–0		
November 17	at Illinois*	Memorial Stadium; Champaign, IL	L 0–27	25,000	
November 24	at Florida	Barrs Field; Jacksonville, FL	T 13–13		
December 1	LSU	Scott Field; Starkville, MS (rivalry)	W 14–7	5,000	
*Non-conference game
