= Al Clemens =

American gridiron football player (1898–1993)

Biographical details
- Born: November 1, 1898; Scottsboro, Alabama, U.S.
- Died: May 19, 1993 (aged 94); Hollywood, Florida, U.S.

Playing career

Football
- 1920–1923: Alabama
- Position: End

Coaching career (HC unless noted)

Football
- 1924–1925: Huntsville JC
- 1926–1928: Jacksonville State
- 1930–1931: Tuscaloosa HS (AL)
- c. 1934–1942: Vicksburg Central HS (MS)
- 1946–1950: Southwestern (TN)

Basketball
- 1927–1928: Jacksonville State

Baseball
- 1927–1928: Jacksonville State

Administrative career (AD unless noted)
- 1926–1928: Southwestern (TN)
- 1942–1950: Jacksonville State

Accomplishments and honors

Awards
- 2× All-Southern (1920, 1923)

Albert Hobson "Silent Al" Clemens (November 1, 1898 – May 19, 1993) was an American football, basketball, and baseball player and coach and college athletics administrator.

== Playing career ==
Clemens played football, basketball, and baseball at the University of Alabama. He also threw the javelin on the track team.

=== Football ===
Clemens was a prominent end for the Alabama Crimson Tide football team. He was captain of the 1921 team under Xen C. Scott and again captain of the 1923 team—the first season under Wallace Wade.

==== 1920 ====
Clemens was chosen All-Southern in 1920 by various selectors.

==== 1921 ====
Clemens was one of only two returning starters in 1921, serving as captain.

==== 1922 ====
Clemens played during one of Alabama's first great victories in 1922, over Penn.

==== 1923 ====
In Wallace Wade's first season as head coach and Clemens' second as captain he was again selected All-Southern.

== Coaching career ==
=== Huntsville Junior College ===
Out of university he coached for Huntsville Junior College.

=== Jacksonville State Teachers College ===
Before 1930, Clemens was coach and athletic director at the Jacksonville State Teachers College in Jacksonville, Alabama. He boldly scheduled Southern Intercollegiate Athletic Association elevens, and only ever lost two games to junior colleges. Across all sports he won 7 junior college titles in 3 seasons.

=== Tuscaloosa High ===
Clemens was head coach and athletic director of the Tuscaloosa High School Black Bears. He took the position in 1930. After 1931 the team had been unbeaten for seven years (63 games). Coach Clemens challenged any high school in the nation to a game.

=== Vicksburg Central High ===
He was head coach and athletic director at Vicksburg's Carr Central High "where his teams were the terror of the Big Eight Conference." Clemens resigned to take the job at Southwestern. He was replaced by former Mississippi State football player Gene Chadwick.

=== Southwestern ===
Clemens was coach and athletic director at Southwestern Presbyterian University—now known as Rhodes College—from 1942 to 1950. Eight of his basketball players organized a strike against him in 1950.
