= Blue–Gray Football Classic =

Annual college football all-star game

Blue–Gray Football Classic (defunct)
- Ticket to the 1941 game
- Stadium: Movie Gallery Stadium (2003); Cramton Bowl (1939–2001)
- Location: Troy, Alabama (2003); Montgomery, Alabama (1939–2001)
- Operated: 1939–2001, 2003

Sponsors
- Kelly Springfield Tire Company

The Blue–Gray Football Classic was an annual American college football all-star game held in Alabama, usually in late December and often on Christmas Day. The brainchild of Alabama college football legend Champ Pickens, the contest began in 1939 and was held annually through 2001, with the exception of 1943 due to World War II.

All of the games, except for the final contest, were played at the Cramton Bowl in Montgomery, Alabama, under the auspices of the Montgomery Lions Club. The game was not contested in 2002, then was revived briefly in 2003 at Movie Gallery Stadium in Troy, Alabama. Lacking a major television sponsor, the game was discontinued thereafter.

== History ==
The format pitted players who attended college in the states of the former Confederacy, the "Grays", who wore white jerseys, against players who attended school in the northern half of the country, the "Blues", who wore blue jerseys, and also sometimes including players from western teams. Both teams wore gray pants. Only seniors played in this game, because it was their first venture into professional football, as they were paid for their participation.

The game was almost always the first major college all-star game of the year. For this reason, it was difficult to get some of the collegiate stars, because many of them were preparing at the same time for bowl games with their regular teams. Also, many potential players preferred to spend Christmas at home. In the game's later years, most of the players came from teams with losing records and from smaller schools which do not play NCAA Division I football. The Classic gave these players an opportunity to be noticed by NFL scouts and others who may not have had the opportunity to observe them previously. Most such players now attend the NFL Combine for evaluation.

Owing to its location in the Deep South, the game was slow to desegregate. In 1963, NBC, which had televised the game for much of its run, dropped it from the schedule when the Lions Club refused to integrate it. The game finally desegregated in 1965, which in turn convinced CBS to acquire broadcasting rights. From then on, the Classic showcased many African American stars from smaller, lesser-known schools (including many historically black colleges and universities). Jerry Rice played in the 1984 game and was named the Most Valuable Player.

However, civil rights leaders complained that forcing African-American players from southern colleges and universities to represent the former Confederacy was both insensitive and offensive. Also in the late 1960s, as a result of growing public dissension over the Vietnam War, peace activists decried the contest as glorifying war and militarism. A large sit-in for peace was staged before the 1969 game that effectively blocked the gates at the stadium which resulted in protesters being forcibly removed, brutally beaten and arrested by the police. The start of the game was delayed for over an hour, and only part of the game was televised. For the next three years, troops of the Alabama National Guard were deployed to the stadium to keep order, on the orders of Governor George Wallace.

The Classic also made many concessions to make it more television-friendly. In 1975, Mizlou Television Network, which carried the game that year, cut three minutes off the game clock by shortening the first quarter to 12 minutes long. The Classic's committee, angered by the change (and an accusation that the clock had been slowed to allow a game-winning rally), asserted control over the game clock for future games so that such an incident could not happen again. The game also used a "rally rule": after either team scored (by way of safety, touchdown, field goal, or returning blocked PAT attempts), if one of the two teams was losing by ten or more points, they would receive the kickoff, in order to keep the game close and prevent the loss of viewership which often occurs in lopsided games. From 1979 onward (and occasionally before that), the game was played on Christmas Day, which may have tended to limit the live attendance, but ensured it was on television at a time when potential viewership was great.

The game was not played in 2002 after longtime sponsor Kelly Springfield Tire (a subsidiary of the Goodyear Tire and Rubber Company), under pressure by civil rights leaders who threatened a boycott, decided to discontinue its sponsorship, and the Lions Club was unable to find a new sponsor in time. However, it was unlikely in any event the game would have been played that year due to the poor condition of the Cramton Bowl: the stadium, built in 1923, had not been well maintained over the years, and by this time it was literally crumbling.

The Lions Club was instrumental in reviving the game at Troy University's Movie Gallery Stadium (now Veterans Memorial Stadium), 50 miles south of Montgomery. It was generally thought that the Lions Club and others would have liked to return the game to Montgomery, but opted not to do so because it was unable to find a suitable replacement venue in the Montgomery area.

The Cramton Bowl was ultimately renovated in 2011; new ASU Stadium was also constructed at the same time. In December 2014, the Cramton Bowl began hosting the Camellia Bowl—the 2020 edition was held on Christmas Day, returning college football to the venue on the holiday for the first time in 19 years.

== Game results ==
64 Blue–Gray Football Classics were played: Gray winning 33 games, Blue winning 29 games, and two games being tied. All were played in Montgomery, Alabama, except the 2003 game, played in Troy, Alabama.

#	Date	Winner	Score
1	January 1, 1939	Blue	7–0
2	December 30, 1939	Gray	33–20
3	December 28, 1940	Blue	14–12
4	December 27, 1941	Gray	16–0
5	December 26, 1942	Gray	24–0
6	December 30, 1944	Gray	24–7
7	December 29, 1945	Blue	26–0
8	December 28, 1946	Gray	20–13
9	December 27, 1947	Gray	33–6
10	December 25, 1948	Blue	19–13
11	December 31, 1949	Gray	27–13
12	December 30, 1950	Gray	31–6
13	December 29, 1951	Gray	20–14
14	December 27, 1952	Gray	28–7
15	December 26, 1953	Gray	40–20
16	December 25, 1954	Blue	14–7
17	December 31, 1955	Gray	20–19
18	December 29, 1956	Blue	14–0
19	December 28, 1957	Gray	21–20
20	December 27, 1958	Blue	16–0
21	December 26, 1959	Blue	20–8
22	December 31, 1960	Blue	35–7

#	Date	Winner	Score
23	December 30, 1961	Gray	9–7
24	December 29, 1962	Blue	10–6
25	December 28, 1963	Gray	21–14
26	December 26, 1964	Blue	10–6
27	December 25, 1965	Gray	23–19
28	December 24, 1966	Blue	14–9
29	December 30, 1967	Blue	22–16
30	December 28, 1968	Gray	28–7
31	December 27, 1969	Tie	6–6
32	December 28, 1970	Gray	9–0
33	December 28, 1971	Gray	27–15
34	December 27, 1972	Gray	20–14
35	December 18, 1973	Blue	20–14
36	December 17, 1974	Blue	29–24
37	December 19, 1975	Blue	14–13
38	December 24, 1976	Gray	31–10
39	December 30, 1977	Blue	20–16
40	December 29, 1978	Gray	28–24
41	December 25, 1979	Blue	22–13
42	December 25, 1980	Blue	24–23
43	December 25, 1981	Blue	21–9
44	December 25, 1982	Gray	20–10

#	Date	Winner	Score
45	December 25, 1983	Gray	17–13
46	December 25, 1984	Gray	33–6
47	December 25, 1985	Blue	27–20
48	December 25, 1986	Blue	31–7
49	December 25, 1987	Gray	12–10
50	December 25, 1988	Blue	22–21
51	December 25, 1989	Gray	28–10
52	December 25, 1990	Blue	17–14
53	December 25, 1991	Gray	20–12
54	December 25, 1992	Gray	27–17
55	December 25, 1993	Gray	17–10
56	December 25, 1994	Blue	38–27
57	December 25, 1995	Blue	26–7
58	December 25, 1996	Blue	44–34
59	December 25, 1997	Gray	31–24
60	December 25, 1998	Gray	31–24
61	December 25, 1999	Tie	22–22
62	December 25, 2000	Gray	40–37
63	December 25, 2001	Blue	28–10
64	December 25, 2003	Blue	31–24

== See also ==
- List of college bowl games
