= Champ Pickens Cup =

1920s award to the champion of the Southern Conference

- Awarded for: Champion of the Southern Conference
- Country: United States
- Presented by: Board of sportswriters

The Champ Pickens Cup was a trophy awarded to the champion of the Southern Conference as selected by a board of sportswriters from 1923 to 1926. The cup was donated and awarded by Alabama's Champ Pickens.

== List of trophy winners ==
| Year | Trophy recipient | Conference record | Notes |
|---|---|---|---|
| 1923 | Vanderbilt | 3–0–1 | Florida upset Alabama, previously undefeated in conference play. |
| 1924 | Alabama | 5–0 | Wallace Wade's first conference title. |
| 1925 | Alabama | 7–0 | The first Southern team to win a Rose Bowl. |
| 1926 | Alabama | 8–0 | Alabama wins national championship. |
