= 1923 Vanderbilt Commodores football team =

American college football season

1923 Vanderbilt Commodores football
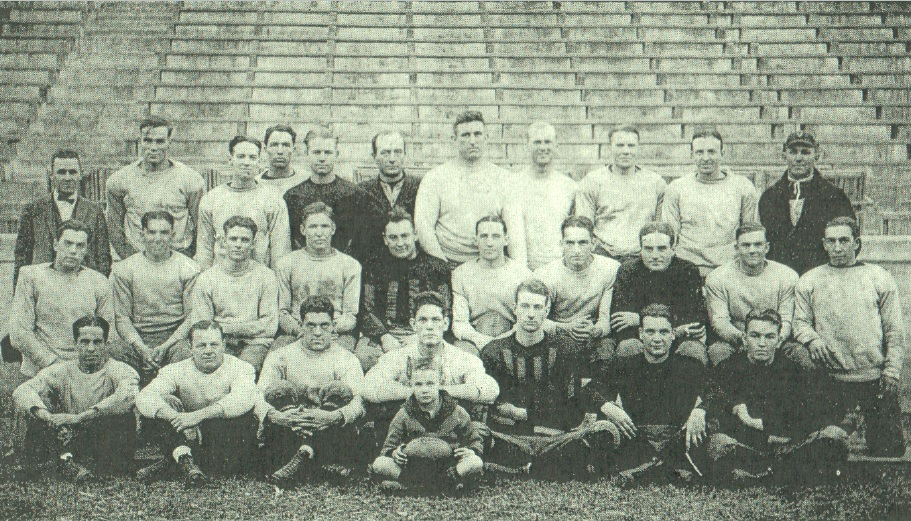

SoCon co-champion
- Conference: Southern Conference, Southern Intercollegiate Athletic Association
- Record: 5–2–1 (3–0–1 SoCon, 2–0 SIAA)
- Head coach: Dan McGugin (19th season)
- Offensive scheme: Short punt
- Captain: Oliver Kuhn
- Home stadium: Dudley Field

Uniform
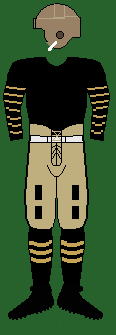

1923 Southern Conference football standings
	Conf.					Overall
Team	W		L		T	W		L		T
Washington & Lee +	4	–	0	–	1	6	–	3	–	1
Vanderbilt * +	3	–	0	–	1	5	–	2	–	1
VPI	4	–	1	–	0	6	–	3	–	0
Alabama	4	–	1	–	1	7	–	2	–	1
Maryland	2	–	1	–	0	7	–	2	–	1
Florida	1	–	0	–	2	6	–	1	–	2
North Carolina	2	–	1	–	1	5	–	3	–	1
Georgia	3	–	2	–	0	5	–	3	–	1
Mississippi A&M	2	–	1	–	2	5	–	2	–	2
Tennessee	4	–	3	–	0	5	–	4	–	1
Tulane	2	–	2	–	1	6	–	3	–	1
Clemson	1	–	1	–	1	5	–	2	–	1
Georgia Tech	0	–	0	–	4	3	–	2	–	4
NC State	1	–	4	–	0	3	–	7	–	0
Auburn	0	–	1	–	3	3	–	3	–	3
Kentucky	0	–	2	–	2	4	–	3	–	2
Virginia	0	–	3	–	1	3	–	5	–	1
LSU	0	–	3	–	0	3	–	5	–	1
Ole Miss	0	–	4	–	0	4	–	6	–	0
South Carolina	0	–	4	–	0	4	–	6	–	0
+ – Conference co-champions; * co-member of SIAA

1923 Southern Intercollegiate Athletic Association football standings
	Conf.					Overall
Team	W		L		T	W		L		T
Furman $	4	–	1	–	0	9	–	2	–	0
Centre	2	–	0	–	0	7	–	1	–	1
Vanderbilt*	2	–	0	–	0	5	–	2	–	1
Western Kentucky	2	–	0	–	0	3	–	4	–	0
Mississippi College	3	–	0	–	1	5	–	1	–	2
The Citadel	2	–	1	–	1	5	–	3	–	1
Presbyterian	2	–	1	–	1	4	–	3	–	1
Louisville	2	–	1	–	0	5	–	2	–	0
Sewanee	3	–	2	–	0	5	–	4	–	1
Oglethorpe	3	–	3	–	0	4	–	6	–	0
Chattanooga	1	–	3	–	1	3	–	4	–	2
Howard (AL)	1	–	3	–	1	3	–	4	–	3
Wofford	1	–	3	–	0	6	–	3	–	0
Mercer	2	–	2	–	0	4	–	5	–	0
Millsaps	0	–	1	–	1	0	–	1	–	1
Louisiana College	0	–	1	–	0	0	–	1	–	0
Georgetown (KY)	0	–	1	–	0	0	–	3	–	0
Transylvania	0	–	3	–	0	0	–	3	–	0
Newberry	0	–	4	–	0	2	–	8	–	0
$ – Conference champion; * – co-member of SoCon

The 1923 Vanderbilt Commodores football team represented Vanderbilt University in the sport of college football during the 1923 Southern Conference football season. The team's head coach was Dan McGugin, who served his 19th year in that capacity. The Commodores played six home games at Dudley Field in Nashville, Tennessee. Vanderbilt finished the season with a record of 5–2–1 overall and 3–0–1 in SoCon play, outscoring opponents 137–33. The team suffered its losses to the national champion Michigan Wolverines and the undefeated Texas Longhorns.

The Vanderbilt team was members of the Southern Conference (SoCon) as well as co-members of the Southern Intercollegiate Athletic Association (SIAA). They won the conference title for the third straight year, tying with Washington & Lee for the SoCon championship. Most sportswriters listed the Commodores as the best team in the South and winners of the championship outright, resulting in their receiving the Champ Pickens Trophy. It is still to date the most recent conference title for Vanderbilt football.

The offense was led by captain and quarterback Oliver Kuhn and All-Southern halfback Gil Reese. The defense, which allowed and average of 2.33 points per game at home, was anchored by All-Southern ends Lynn Bomar and Hek Wakefield. As was common in 1923 and the days of one platoon football, both Bomar and Wakefield also featured heavily on offense and the kicking game. Bomar was also a consensus All-American, even selected for Walter Camp's first team, a rarity for a player from the South. Of Wakefield's performance during the Michigan game, Michigan head coach Fielding Yost said "I never saw a greater exhibition of end play."

== Schedule ==
Date	Opponent	Site	Result	Attendance	Source
October 6	Howard (AL)*	Dudley Field; Nashville, TN	W 27–0		
October 13	at Michigan*	Ferry Field; Ann Arbor, MI	L 0–3	30,000	
October 20	at Texas*	Fair Park Stadium; Dallas, TX	L 0–16	15,000	
October 27	Tulane	Dudley Field; Nashville, TN	W 17–0	10,000	
November 3	Mississippi A&M	Dudley Field; Nashville, TN	T 0–0		
November 10	Tennessee	Dudley Field; Nashville, TN (rivalry)	W 51–7		
November 17	Georgia	Dudley Field; Nashville, TN (rivalry)	W 35–7	15,000	
November 29	Sewanee*	Dudley Field; Nashville, TN (rivalry)	W 7–0	15,000–17,500	
*Non-conference game

== Before the season ==
Following two unbeaten seasons, Wallace Wade left his position at assistant coach to be head coach at Alabama, where he went on to win three national and four SoCon titles. He was replaced at Vanderbilt with former All-American tackle and Vanderbilt alumnus Josh Cody. (Note: He was named by the Football Writers Association to the 1869–1918 Early Era All-American Team in 1969) Vanderbilt faced a hard schedule through the month of October.

Quarterback Oliver Kuhn was elected captain at the end of last year. Returning players included Kuhn, Lynn Bomar, Tuck Kelly, Red Rountree, Gil Reese, and Fatty Lawrence; who composed "the nucleus around which Dan McGugin and his assistant "Josh" Cody are forming the 1923 eleven."

Lengthy end Tot McCullough was ruled ineligible for the coming season. Those who played for baseball in the South Georgia league, or any other unrecognized one, were disallowed from participating in varsity athletics in the Southern Conference. Tot had played with the Albany club.

== Game summaries ==
=== Week 1: Howard (AL) ===
The Commodores opened the season at Dudley Field against the Howard Bulldogs on October 6 and were considered heavy favorites. Vanderbilt won by a score of 27–0. The regulars played only in the first quarter, scoring 20 points. Captain Doc Kuhn returned the opening kickoff 60 yards and Tom Ryan ran in the first touchdown. Gil Reese went over for the second touchdown, but fumbled, recovered by Kuhn. Kuhn returned the next kickoff 80 yards for a touchdown. One source said it was the best return on Dudley Field since Lee Tolley's punt return in 1913. Substitute quarterback Alvin Bell got the final touchdown.

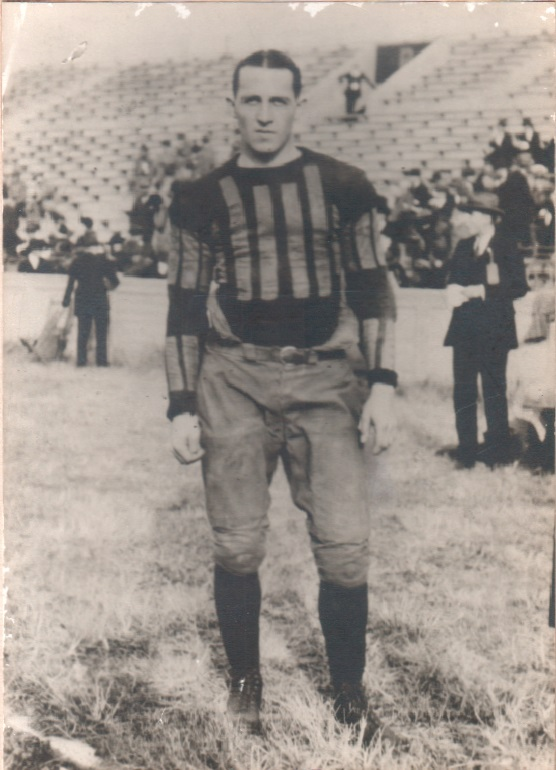
Captain Oliver Kuhn on opening day.

Vanderbilt's starting lineup for the Howard game: Bomar (left end), Reeves (left tackle), Lawrence (left guard), Sharp (center), Kelley (right guard), Walker (right tackle), Wakefield (right end), Kuhn (quarterback), S. T. Porter (left halfback), Reese (right halfback), Ryan (fullback).

To the woe of Commodore fans, tackle Tex Bradford was ruled ineligible on October 10; on grounds of having already played four years of college athletics. His loss was lamented so near the eve of the Michigan game, for his line work against them was "materially responsible" for the 0 to 0 tie of last year.

=== Week 2: at Michigan ===
Week 2: Vanderbilt at Michigan

Team	1	2	3	4	Total
Vanderbilt	0	0	0	0	0
• Michigan	0	3	0	0	3

- Date: October 13
- Location: Ferry Field
  Ann Arbor, MI
- Game start: 3:00 p.m.
- Game attendance: 30,000
- Referee: McDonald

In the second week of play, Vanderbilt traveled to Ann Arbor for a rematch of last year's scoreless tie with the Michigan Wolverines. There was much optimism among the Vanderbilt faithful, for last year its team had many injuries when it tied Michigan; and this year the squad was healthy. Michigan's A. J. Sturzenegger had scouted Vanderbilt shortly before the game, and found the Commodores to have good reason for thinking they could win. He was not alone in this view, the Commodores were "regarded as having fully as strong an aggregation as last year."

Vanderbilt lost the hard-fought game 3–0, handing the Commodores their first loss in two years. Much like last year, the game featured little offense and stalwart defense. Vanderbilt "handcuffed the Wolverines' running and passing game" and "had a defense which became nothing less than a stone wall whenever her goal was threatened." Both Commodore halfback Gil Reese and Wolverine halfback Harry Kipke were "marked men"; and Vanderbilt's offense never crossed the 35-yard line. Reese and Doc Kuhn were said to raise fans to their feet with the showcase of speed, but the Wolverines kept it confined to sideways runs of little gain. A wire service account of the game noted the defensive play, "Both played crafty football, the fumbling that tended to mar the game being more than offset by swift, dashing interception of passes while the work of the linesmen on both sides was at top form."

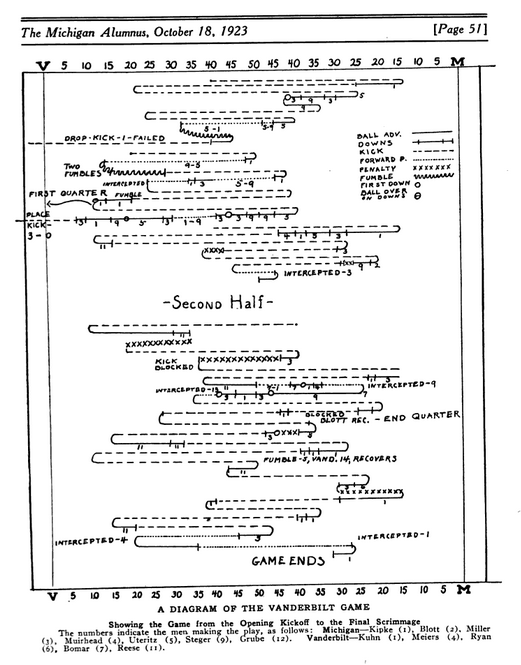
Diagram of the game.

The lone score of the game came on a 15-yard field goal by consensus first-team All-American Jack Blott in the second quarter. Play was in Vanderbilt territory for all of the first half. After Michigan had reached the Vanderbilt 7-yard line, two drives at the line failed, resulting in lost yardage. On third down, Jack Blott was called into the backfield from his normal position at center and kicked a field goal. Two field goal attempts by Kipke failed. One was blocked and another rolled under the cross bar. The one other long gain of the day was a 20-yard run late in the third quarter from Herb Steger. The run came just after Vanderbilt had advanced its furthest into Michigan territory and had its drive ended by a Steger interception. Vanderbilt never advanced far enough to attempt a field goal.

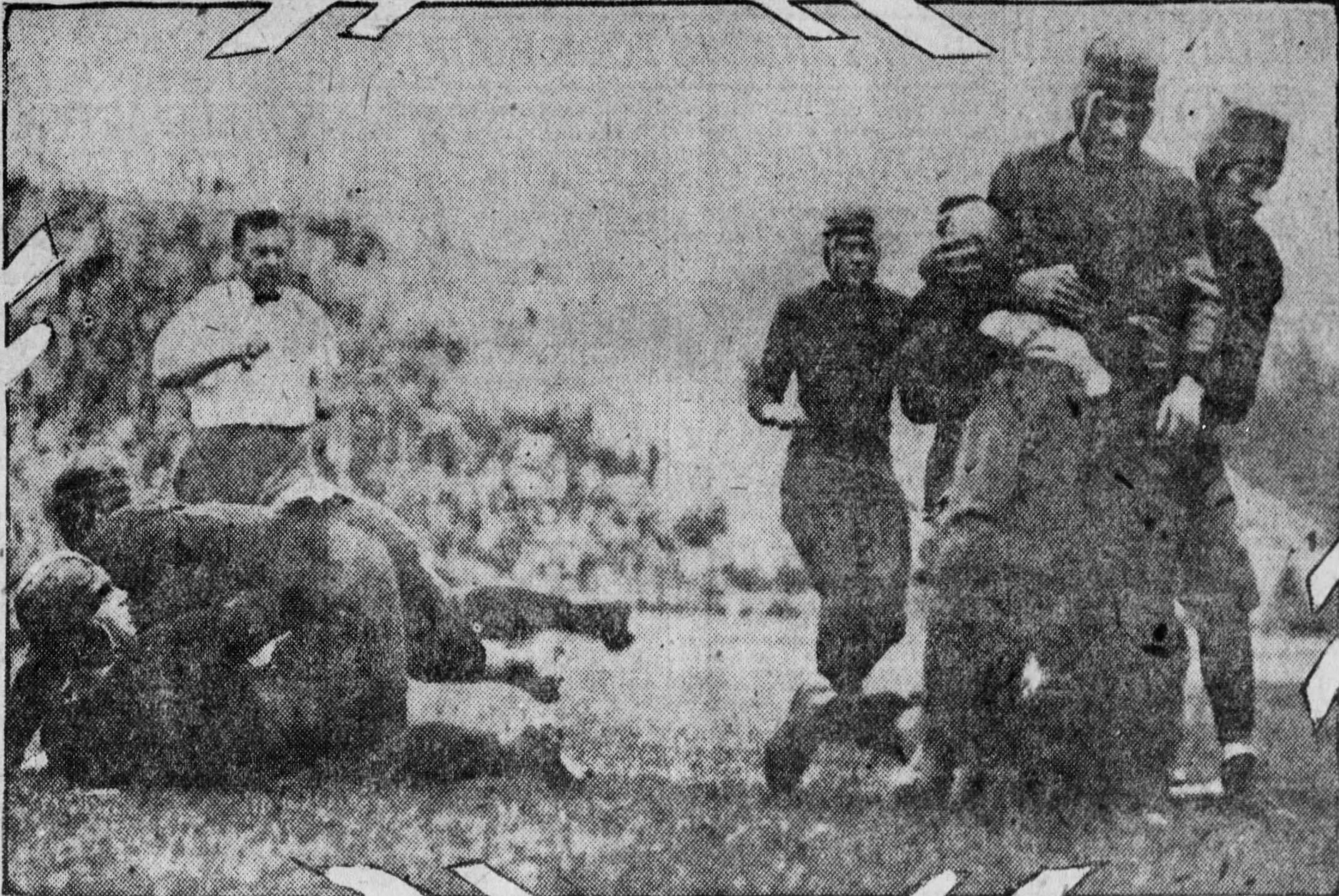
Michigan quarterback Uteritz sacked by Vanderbilt.

Vanderbilt's best player that day was Hek Wakefield, showcasing his skill in tackling Michigan's runners. "I never saw a greater exhibition of end play," said Fielding Yost, referring to Wakefield. The Kingsport Times reported that governor Austin Peay had given Hek praise for his play that day. Thomas Ryan also had a fine game, out-punting the famed Harry Kipke. The Michigan Alumnus attributed this to Ryan's superior line, claiming Kipke was under constant threat of a blocked punt. The Alumnus also said Kipke could not seek to return punts, for fear of fumbling. As soon as he received the ball, Vanderbilt ends Hek Wakefield or Lynn Bomar would crash into him. After the game, the referee McDonald approached guard Tuck Kelly and told him, "You are the first individual I've complimented after a game in which I officiated, but I want to tell you that I never saw a better guard than you are." Steger was Michigan's best runner that day. The Wolverines' backfield having three men who could pass the ball in Kipke, Steger, and Uteritz, was said to help them throughout the game by vexing Vanderbilt's secondary.

The Michigan Alumnus summarized the game thus: "Never surely was a game more lacking in spectacular features and thrills. For a good part of the time it gave one the same sort of feeling which was so common during the Great War, when a gain of a few yards was a matter for rejoicing, and it was hard to believe that even the most dashing attack could accomplish any lasting results." The game featured few penalties, no injuries, and few substitutions. Michigan made only three substitutions, and Vanderbilt not a one. Michigan completed 5 out of 16 passes for 90 yards. Vanderbilt completed just 1 of 5 for a 9-yard gain. A diagram of the game says this one pass was from Kuhn to Bomar.

Michigan and Red Grange's Illinois both finished the 1923 season undefeated and share both Big Ten and national titles.

Vanderbilt's starting lineup for the Michigan game: Bomar (left end), Bradford (left tackle), Lawrence (left guard), Sharp (center), Kelly (right guard), Rives (right tackle), Wakefield (right end), Kuhn (quarterback), Meiers (left halfback), Reese (right halfback), Ryan (fullback).

=== Week 3: at Texas ===
Week 3: Vanderbilt at Texas

Team	1	2	3	4	Total
Vanderbilt	0	0	0	0	0
• Texas	6	0	3	7	16

- Date: October 20
- Location: Fair Park Stadium
  Dallas, TX

The third week of play saw the lone upset that week in the South, as Vanderbilt lost to the Texas Longhorns in Dallas. Before the game, the Mexia Daily News reported "that Vandy outweighs Texas about fifteen pounds to the man but remember the saying "the bigger they are the harder they fall"' The Longhorns were coached by Ed Stewart. In the first period Vanderbilt drove to within a few yards of the goal, but Texas held. Lane Tynes and Oscar Eckhardt led the Texas drive which ended in a score. In the third quarter, Robert Robertson kicked a 45-yard field goal. A 12-yard run by Oscar Eckhardt over left tackle in the fourth quarter was the final score. Onlookers said Oscar Eckhardt "flattened tacklers like dominoes," until almost down at the 8-yard line. He regained his balance with one hand and plowed over for the score that led to a 16–0 victory. Said the Fort Worth Star-Telegram of Eckhardt's run, "Eckhardt, knocked to earth, rose like a phoenix and blazed down the line until he crossed the thin white marker. In all, he drove 20 yards through the gold and black to put his name in the Texas Varsity hall of fame." Blinkey Horn, sportswriter for the Nashville Tennessean, wrote "In Texas, Oscar Eckhardt has displaced Davy Crockett, Sam Houston, and the Alamo. If there are any more institutions in the new country, he has set them aside. Texas beat its first six opponents by a combined score of 202-0, and finish the year undefeated at 8-0-1. This was Vanderbilt's first loss to a southern team since 1920. The travel, to Texas four days after returning from Michigan, was cited as a reason for the loss. One writer put it as "the cross-country trip was too much for the stamina of the team."

Hugh McDermott, scouting for the Oklahoma Sooners, said the kicks from Eckhardt in the '23 Texas-Vandy game featured the best kicking he had ever seen. He recounted, "Once Eckhardt put the ball in play from his 15-yard line following a fair catch and punted 65 yards on the fly over the entire Vanderbilt team."

=== Week 4: Tulane ===
Week 4: Tulane at Vanderbilt

Team	1	2	3	4	Total
Tulane	0	0	0	0	0
• Vanderbilt	7	3	0	7	17

- Date: October 27
- Location: Dudley Field
  Nashville, TN
- Game attendance: 10,000

The next week saw a match back at Nashville between two teams which had lost to Texas — Vanderbilt and Tulane. Tulane had lost to Texas on October 13, 33–0. Vanderbilt beat Tulane 17–0 with scores mostly due to blocked punts.

Tulane showed considerable optimism going into its road trip with Vanderbilt, Tennessee, and Auburn. Ed Hebert of the Times-Picayune wrote of underdog Tulane, "Handicapped through the absence of their captain "Little Eva" Talbot, through an injury, the Greenbacks have become more determined to upset the dope kettle and completely bathe the Vandy eleven in a contest that points every way to a victory for the powerful crew that held the Michigan Wolverines to a 3–0 victory recently at Ann Arbor." On having played similar foes in Texas, he went on, "Thus if Vandy can be so outclassed by a club that Tulane has already fought every inch of the way it stands that there is going to be fur-flying in copious quantities when the Commodores and Greenbacks meet Saturday." Tulane had a renowned backfield of Lester Lautenschlaeger, Brother Brown, Ellis Henican, and Peggy Flournoy. The "Greenies" were coached by Clark Shaughnessy.

Vanderbilt was without its quarterback and captain Doc Kuhn as well as halfback Gil Reese. Reese had hurt his knee, and during the previous week's game against the Texas Longhorns, Kuhn was hit on the head and had still yet to gain his mental composure. Hek Wakefield was shifted to quarterback. Red Rountree took Reese's place.

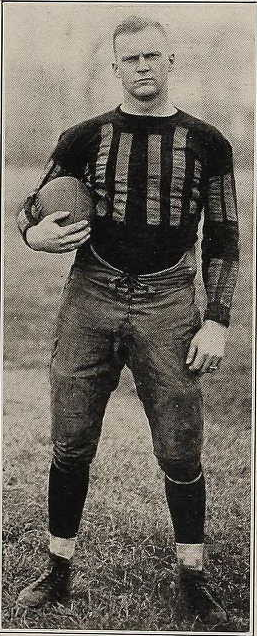
Lynn Bomar

The first score came on a punt off the toe of Flournoy. Vanderbilt drove all the way to Tulane's 7-yard line before four unsuccessful runs at Tulane's line by Rountree gave the Greenbacks the ball back deep in their territory. On the ensuing punt, Tulane's line was broken by Tom Ryan, Bob Rives, Bo Rowland, and Lynn Bomar. Bomar blocked the kick. In the ensuing scramble, Alfred Sharp dove to recover the football in the end zone. The second came when Lynn Bomar helped Vanderbilt run to the 33-yard line, where Wakefield drop kicked a field goal. After this Tulane drove right down to Vanderbilt's 5-yard line when the whistle sounded to end the half.

In the fourth quarter, Vanderbilt got the ball due to a Tulane fumble. Bomar ran for many yards, and Vanderbilt was at Tulane's 1-yard line. Four dives at the line from Bomar were all for naught and again Tulane had the ball near its own goal. Bomar again blocked the punt, but Henican recovered and rushed to the 20-yard line before being stopped. On the next punt, Flournoy fumbled the ball and fell on it at his own 5-yard line. From there Rountree got the score on fourth down.

Lynn Bomar's play was exemplary. "Take Bomar out of the Vandy lineup", said Hebert, "and Tulane would have won the game by three touchdowns." Bob Rives was also given praise, called "No. 1 gallant in the line." Blinkey Horn of the Nashville Tennessean, wrote of the outcome, "Back up the slope the Commodores have started. They did not scale the rim in their 17-0 triumph over Tulane, but they shook from their feet much of the muck which mired them in Texas. They did not reach the splendor of the sunlight, in harvesting two touchdowns and a field goal out of the fog. Vision of the peak is denied the Commodores but no longer is there so thick a blur over the binoculars."

Vanderbilt's starting lineup for Tulane: Roland (left end), Rives (left tackle), Kelly (left guard), Sharp (center), Lawrence (right guard), Walker (right tackle), Bomar (right end), Wakefield (quarterback), Meiers (left halfback), Rountree (right halfback), Ryan (fullback).

=== Week 5: Mississippi A & M ===
Week 5: Mississippi A & M at Vanderbilt

Team	1	2	3	4	Total
Miss. A & M	0	0	0	0	0
Vanderbilt	0	0	0	0	0

- Date: November 3
- Location: Dudley Field
  Nashville, TN
- Game weather: Rain
- Referee: Stewart (Dartmouth)

In a cold drizzle and a well soaked field, Vanderbilt and the Mississippi A&M Aggies played to a scoreless tie. The outcome was much a result of Mississippi A & M's defense and Vanderbilt's fumbles. The Aggies were coached by Earl Abell.

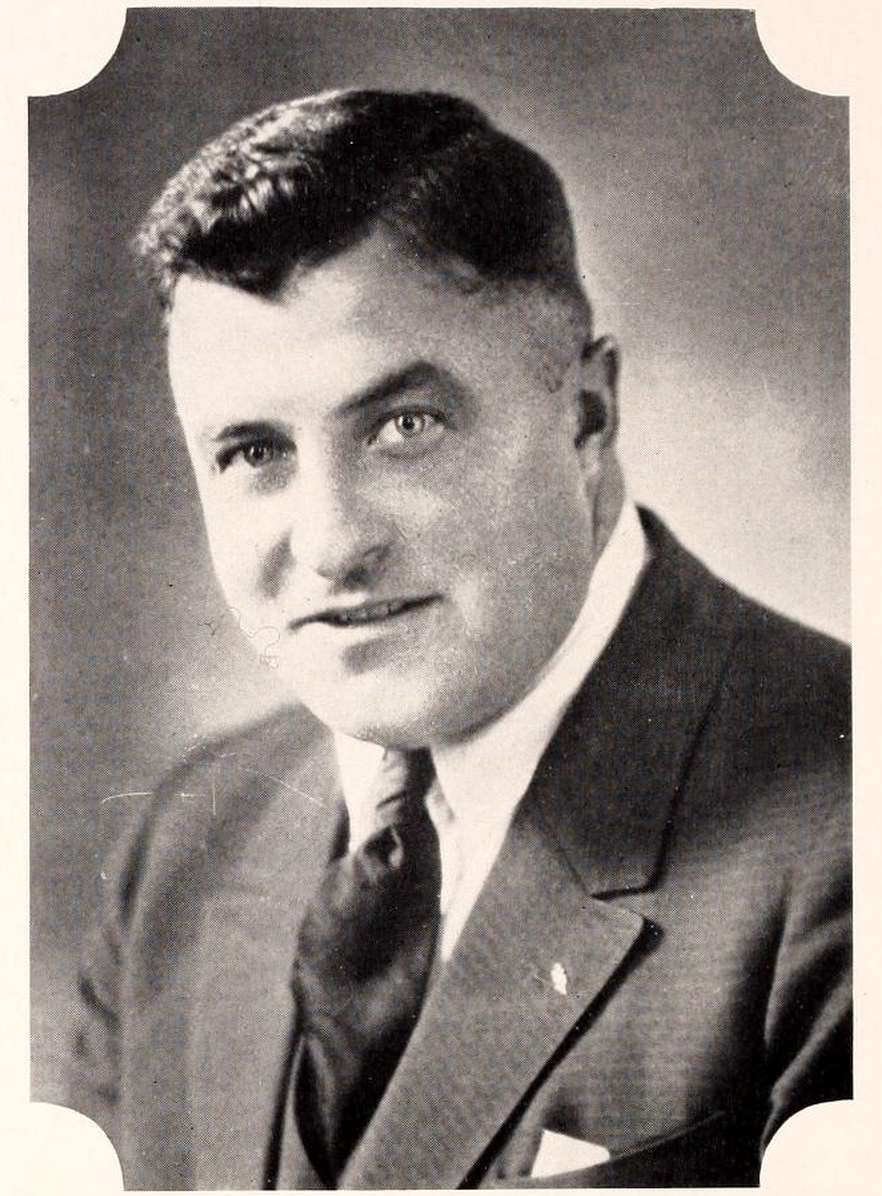
Mississippi A & M head coach Earl Abell.

The kickoff from Lynn Bomar went to P. E. Stephens at the Aggies' 5-yard line, who returned it for 10 yards. The Aggies would punt. Gil Reese went around end for an 11-yard run, getting the ball to Mississippi's 15-yard line. There, the Commodores were held. Later in the first quarter, Oliver Kuhn ran around the left end for a 43-yard gain. On a fourth down, a pass from Hek Wakefield to Kuhn was incomplete, and the ball went over on downs. The Aggies then started to advance the ball for the first time, until throwing an interception to Gil Reese at Vanderbilt's 40-yard line. Reese returned the ball to Mississippi's 25-yard line. But again, the Aggies' defense stood tall.

The second quarter started with the Aggies' offense advancing. They went from their own 25-yard line to midfield using the run game. The Aggies punted to Vanderbilt's 25-yard line. Wakefield netted a long punt over the Aggies' safety man back to their own 20-yard line. A pass of 15 yards had the Aggies' driving until stopped at the 43-yard line. On the next possession for Vandy, Reese lost 15 yards in an attempt to go around the right end. Vanderbilt was getting the upper-hand in field position from the series of punts, but Kuhn fumbled with the Aggies recovering at their own 40-yard line. On the next possession for Vanderbilt there was again another lost fumble, this time by Tom Ryan at Mississippi's 45-yard line.

Bomar again kicked to the Aggies, who would punt it back. Gil Reese made a return of 30 yards to his own 45-yard line. Ryan ran up the middle for 15 yards, and Reese lost 7. From here the advance was stymied, and Wakefield attempted the 31-yard drop kick. A heavy, slick ball missed. Reese against lost considerable yardage Vandy's next possession, being thrown back 19 yards on an attempted end run. This again hurt what they had gained in the punt exchanges. The fourth quarter started with Vanderbilt driving into Mississippi territory, working from the 40-yard line to the 25, before being held. Later, a 25-yard end run from Reese was called back due to Vandy committing an offside penalty. Melfere then passed to Kuhn for a 15-yard gain. Another pass worked, Kuhn to Bomar for 20 yards more. The Commodores fumbled, and the Aggies recovered at the 10-yard line. After another punt Vanderbilt tried desperately its passes near midfield, but was unsuccessful. The game ended with Mississippi A & M having the ball near midfield.

The Aggies played their best game all season. The Times-Picayune noted, "Entering that game doped to lose the Aggies played a defensive game punting almost every time the pigskin was obtained by them. But even with defensive tactics letting Vandy hold the ball the majority of the time they scored half as many first downs as did the Commodores." Gil Reese was the biggest feature of Vanderbilt's offense, as Bomar, Wakefield, and Kenneth Bryan were given praise on the defensive side of the ball. Halfbacks Stephens and H. G. Perkins were offensive standouts for Mississippi A & M. The Aggies went on to also tie Florida, their only Southern loss coming against Tennessee the week before the Vandy game.

The starting lineup for the Mississippi A&M game was the following: Bomar (left end), Rives (left tackle), Lawrence (left guard), Sharp (center), Bryan (right guard), Walker (right tackle), Wakefield (right end), Kuhn (quarterback), Reese (left halfback), Rountree (right halfback), Ryan (fullback).

=== Week 6: Tennessee ===
Week 6: Tennessee at Vanderbilt

Team	1	2	3	4	Total
Tennessee	0	0	0	7	7
• Vanderbilt	27	10	0	14	51

- Date: November 10
- Location: Dudley Field
  Nashville, TN
- Referee: Babcock

With a 51–7 victory over the Tennessee Volunteers, the Commodores regained "all the power and smoothness with which it had started the 1923 season." Ralph McGill reflected the sentiment, "All the pent-up fury of misunderstanding and disappointment burst out like a flood. The Vols might as well have flung themselves in the way of a runaway train. It was a machine that found itself. The power was there and the Commodores took a fierce joy in using it." The Volunteers were led by M. B. Banks, in his third year as head coach.

Vanderbilt gained 455 yards of total offense. Gil Reese rushed for 214 yards, as well as 95 yards on punt returns. Reese scored five times, with touchdown runs of 70 yards, 45 yards, and 29 yards respectively. Red Rountree scored another, a 63-yard run. Captain Kuhn got the other touchdown, and Wakefield made a drop kick. Lynn Bomar, Alfred Sharp, and Bob Rives on defense helped hold the Volunteers to only 7. With the win Vanderbilt was still a contender for the Southern title. Lowe played best for Tennessee, getting its lone touchdown.

Vanderbilt's starting lineup for Tennessee: Bomar (left end), Rives (left tackle), Lawrence (left guard), Sharp (center), Bryan (right guard), Walker (right tackle), Wakefield (right end), Kuhn (quarterback), Reese (left halfback), Rountree (right halfback), Ryan (fullback).

=== Week 7: Georgia ===
Week 7: Georgia at Vanderbilt

Team	1	2	3	4	Total
Georgia	0	0	0	7	7
• Vanderbilt	0	14	14	7	35

- Date: November 17
- Location: Dudley Field
  Nashville, TN
- Game attendance: 15,000
- Referee: Jogger Elcock

On November 17, the Commodores beat the Georgia Bulldogs at Dudley Field by a lopsided score of 35 to 7. Fred Russell said this was when "the Gold and Black hit the season's peak." Morgan Blake, sportswriter in the Atlanta Journal, wrote "No southern team has given the Georgia Bulldogs such a licking in a decade." Georgia was labeled "Dixie's top team;" its only loss coming against traditional powerhouse Yale. Georgia's defense had previously shut out all its Southern Conference opponents, with no southern team crossing the Bulldogs' 20 or 25 yard line. Vanderbilt halfback Gil Reese starred in this game, including two punt returns for touchdowns. A History of the University of Georgia tells us, "it was no difficulty to stop all the players except one. That one was Gil Reese, and he went pretty much wherever he wanted to."

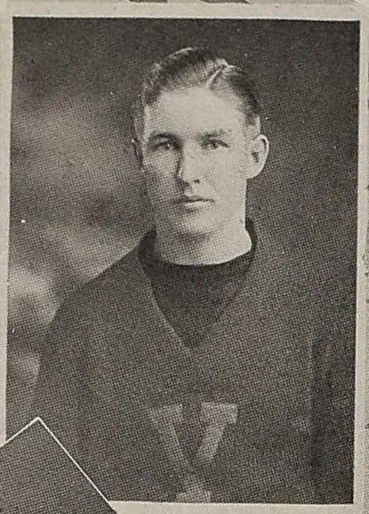
Gil Reese.

Early on in the first quarter, Gil Reese fumbled a punt from Georgia's Joe Bennett; and the Bulldogs' own Jim Taylor recovered it on Vanderbilt's 25-yard line. The Commodores' defense stood tall, and Georgia was unable to score. At some point during the first quarter, Gil Reese foreshadowed what was to come with a 23-yard run. Later on, the Commodores were to get their first score. With the first quarter just about to end, Bennett dropped back to pass. The ball hit off his receiver's finger tips, into the hands of Alfred Sharp for the interception. Sharp was tackled on Georgia's 30-yard line; the pass coming from somewhere inside the 25-yard line. On the ensuing Vanderbilt possession, Red Rountree ran up the middle for a 7-yard gain. Thomas Ryan ran through for 4 more yards and the first down. Ryan ran three more times in a row to close out the quarter, netting another first down on the third carry. This carried the Commodores to the 7-yard line before the quarter closed and teams had to switch sides.

After a 2-yard run from Ryan, Reese ran in for a touchdown behind guard Tuck Kelly. Hek Wakefield missed the field goal for the extra point, but an offside penalty from the Bulldogs awarded the Commodores the point. Punts were exchanged by both teams in the next few possessions. Then Gil Reese returned a punt for 63 yards and the touchdown. Reese started the return by running wide to the right; seven Georgia players were in hot pursuit. Reese stopped in his tracks, causing two Georgia defenders to go past him. Running down the sideline and weaving through the rest of the defenders' missed tackles, eventually Reese was beyond them all and ran in for the score. Morgan Blake says this score was what broke the Bulldogs' will. He further lamented,"when you say that Mr. Reese is a combination of a greyhound, rabbit, antelope, and greased pig you only mildly do this young gentleman justice." Wakefield kicked goal. The first half ended with Vanderbilt up 14 to 0. The Bulldogs had not yet managed a single first down.

In the third quarter, quarterback Oliver Kuhn completed a 45-yard pass to end Hek Wakefield, caught at Georgia's 4-yard line. From there Vandy scored with a line buck from Ryan. Later in the third quarter, Gil Reese ran for 30 yards on a sneak play. It "not only fooled the Bulldogs but everyone in the stands." It seems there was a moment of not knowing where the ball was, until Reese shot out the other side of the line. Punishing runs off tackle then led the Commodores to another touchdown.

Georgia finally put together a drive in the fourth quarter. The drive of 85 yards included 8 first downs; likely a result of a change in strategy, "the Bulldogs decided to quit using the shift and try the old fashioned punt formation. From this formation the Bulldogs ran their ends well and did some deadly forward passing." The Bulldogs completed five forward passes during the drive, for a total of 44 yards. The end runs of Cleckley, Wiehrs, and Nelson also contributed to the Bulldogs' lone touchdown. It was said Cleckley, coming in during the final quarter, who performed the best of all of them. Nelson ran it in for the score, Bennett kicked goal.

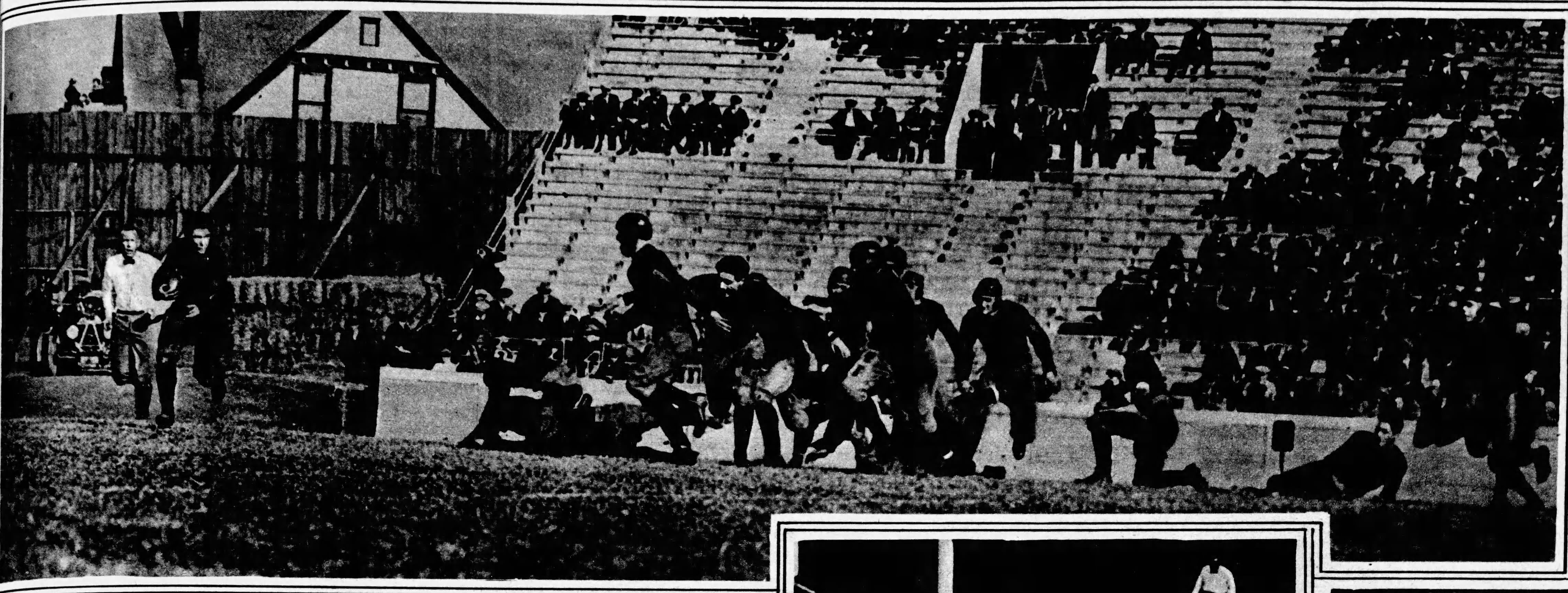
Part of Reese's 81-yard run for a touchdown

Soon afterwards, Gil Reese ran for an 81-yard touchdown. He did it running up the middle of the field, and "behind great interference furnished by the entire Vandy team, and especially Bomar and Kuhn." Former Vanderbilt coach Wallace Wade, who was at the game scouting Georgia, said the Commodores that day were "the smartest I ever saw." Reese ran for over 200 yards for the second week in a row, with 232 yards on his five largest plays and over 300 total yards. Along with Reese's play, Lynn Bomar's and Bob Rives' defensive play were cited as highlights for Vanderbilt. For Georgia, the tackling of Sam Richardson and Jake Butler was "spasmodically brilliant." Also, Jim Taylor and Joe Bennett played well on both sides of the ball.

The victory over Georgia, as well as the surprising tie of Georgia Tech by Kentucky, made the contest for the Southern Conference a three team race between Vanderbilt, Washington & Lee, and Alabama. All of those teams had gone 3-0-1 in conference play to that point.

Vanderbilt starting lineup for the Georgia game: Bomar (left end), Rives (left tackle), Lawrence (left guard), Sharp (center), Kelly (right guard), Walker (right tackle), Wakefield (right end), Kuhn (quarterback), Reese (left halfback), Rountree (right halfback), Ryan (fullback).

=== Week 8: Sewanee ===
Week 8: Sewanee at Vanderbilt

Team	1	2	3	4	Total
Sewanee	0	0	0	0	0
• Vanderbilt	7	0	0	0	7

- Date: November 29
- Location: Dudley Field
  Nashville, TN
- Game attendance: 15,000–17,500
- Referee: Harry Springer (Penn)

The season ended against Vanderbilt's traditional Thanksgiving Day rival Sewanee. Vanderbilt was favored by more than two touchdowns, but the stout Sewanee team and the steady rain made for a close game. Vanderbilt won on a soggy field by the score of 7 to 0. Hay had been placed over the field in an attempt to absorb the rain, but it helped little. The rain had fallen for nearly 24 hours.

Vanderbilt won the toss and elected to defend the north goal, making it so Sewanee had to kick against the wind to open the game. The short punts from Sewanee's Sanders led to a score. Sewanee got the kickoff and punted the ball just 19 yards after two runs failed. Vanderbilt got a first down, but then Hek Wakefield fumbled the ball with Sewanee recovering at the 10-yard line. The ensuing punt from Sewanee's Sanders just went 14 yards. After one first down, Sewanee's defense again stiffened, and the ball was turned over on downs at the 7-yard line. Sewanee got off another short punt; this time of 10 yards. The Commodores were unable to get through the line on its first three downs, but on fourth down Oliver Kuhn hit Gil Reese on a pass, and Reese scampered across the goal line. Wakefield kicked goal. This was the game's first and only scoring drive; the rest of the game marred by punts with few plays in opposing team's side of the field. In the second quarter Gil Reese broke off the longest run of the day for some 40 yards, but Vanderbilt could not use it to score.

Combined the teams would punt 31 times. The game was said to be "mired in the muck of a miserable field." However, one sports fan called the game's only touchdown his "greatest sports thrill". The best players for Sewanee this game were its captain, Litton, on defense, and Gene Harris on offense. On this same Thanksgiving Day, the Florida Gators beat the Alabama Crimson Tide in the rain to help ensure a Southern title for the Commodores. Then Florida players Cy Williams, Goldy Goldstein, and Ark Newton later teamed up with Vanderbilt tackle Bob Rives in 1926, on the Newark Bears of the American Football League.

Vanderbilt's starting lineup for the Sewanee game: Bomar (left end), Rives (left tackle), Lawrence (left guard), Sharp (center), Kelly (right guard), Walker (right tackle), Wakefield (right end), Kuhn (quarterback), Rountree (right halfback), Barker (left halfback), Ryan (fullback).

== Postseason ==
=== Princeton game ===
Princeton at Vanderbilt

Team	1	2	3	4	Total
Princeton	0	7	0	0	7
Vanderbilt	0	7	0	0	7

- Date: December 8
- Location: Dudley Field
  Nashville, TN
- Game attendance: 10,000
- Referee: Bradley Walker

In a postseason contest played for the benefit of local charitable institutions, Vanderbilt played a cast of Princeton varsity stars on December 8. Among the stars were Stan Keck, Frank Murrey, Hank Garrity, John P. Gorman, Ralph Gilroy, A. Barr Snively and Herb Treat. It was the first showcase of Eastern football in Nashville in many years. The Commodores tied the Ex-Tigers, 7-7. Both scores occurred within five minutes of each other.

The one player on Vanderbilt's roster not from the 1923 varsity team was Hek Wakefield's younger brother Robert Allen "Jack" Wakefield. He was a highly renowned back of the freshman team; "One would hardly be wrong in calling Jack Wakefield, Vanderbilt fullback, the greatest player in Southern freshman football for the past season." It was the only game he ever played with a varsity team at Vanderbilt. He soon left to play professional baseball with the Saint Louis Cardinals. Jack twice broke his leg in preliminary work with the Cardinals, leaving him out for the season. On December 10, 1924, after a quarrel with his fiancee, Jack went to the house of a friend in Memphis and committed suicide with a pistol. By all accounts he played an inspired game, "he cut an all Princeton line into shreds of Black and Orange. He threw all America tackles aside as he would throw sacks of straw, and trampled great names into the turf." Then Centre head coach Charley Moran called Jack "the greatest football player I ever saw, barring nobody."

Vanderbilt outplayed the Princeton Tigers to start the second quarter, driving to their 18-yard line. Captain Oliver Kuhn threw a pass to Lynn Bomar, who ran across the goal line for the touchdown. Hek Wakefield kicked goal. Princeton seemed to have awaken after the ensuing kickoff. A 33-yard pass from Snively to Gorman got the Tigers to midfield. Then on a pass which did not go so far in the air, Gorman caught it and ran to the end zone. Gorman made the try, and the game ended as a tie.

Murrey, who organized the meeting, missed three drop kicks in the game. In the first quarter Princeton drove 60 yards down the field, until Murrey missed the kick. Another time in the fourth quarter, Princeton went nearly 80 yards and Murrey's kick was just short. Some time before this last kick was the other missed attempt. Gilroy made a play which was said to resemble his play against Harvard in 1921, wherein he turned a short pass into a 65-yard touchdown, but it was called back due to an offside penalty.

The game raised $6,000 to be divided equally between a home for old ladies and a home for crippled orphan children, the latter known as the Nashville Children's Home. Princeton passed for 134 yards, and made 10 first downs to Vandy's 7.

Vanderbilt's starting lineup for the Princeton game: Bomar (left end), Rives (left tackle), Bryan (left guard), Sharp (center), Kelly (right guard), Walker (right tackle), Wakefield (right end), Kuhn (quarterback), Reese (left halfback), Rountree (right halfback), Ryan (fullback).

=== Southern champions ===
Vanderbilt and Washington & Lee finished the season as co-champions of the Southern Conference. A poll of sportswriters elected the Commodores as best team in the south, awarding them the Champ Pickens Trophy. 12 of 14 votes put Vanderbilt in first place, with 1 each for Washington & Lee and VMI. 6 votes had Washington & Lee in second place, and 2 had Florida in second. This was Vanderbilt's third Southern football title in a row. The trophy was presented at the annual football banquet on December 4, held at the Commercial Club, to captain Oliver Kuhn, by brother Jordan Stokes.

=== All-Southern and All-American ===
Both ends of the All-Southern team came from Vanderbilt, Hek Wakefield and Lynn Bomar. Bomar, who was a consensus All-American in 1923, was the only Southern player selected for Walter Camp's All-American team– and one of the first All-Americans selected for his first team from the South, as well as the last. Georgia athletic director Herman Stegeman called Wakefield "the best player in the South." Coach Dan McGugin ranked Wakefield as the best end he ever had in his long career at Vanderbilt.

In the polling done by the Atlanta Journal, halfback Gil Reese received the second most votes of any All-Southern player with 25. The most went to Douglas Wycoff, fullback at Georgia Tech, who faced little competition. Guard Tuck Kelly was also selected for the All-Southern squad. Tuck was selected at year's end to captain the team next year.

== Personnel ==
=== Coaching staff ===
- Dan McGugin (Michigan '03), head coach
- Josh Cody (Vanderbilt '19), assistant coach
- Lewie Hardage (Vanderbilt '12), backfield coach
- Tommy Zerfoss (Vanderbilt '19), assistant and freshman coach
- Felix K. Grasty, manager

=== Varsity letterwinners ===
==== Line ====
Number	Player	Position	Games started	Hometown	Prep school	Height	Weight	Age
7	Lynn Bomar	End		Gallatin, Tennessee	Fitzgerald and Clarke School	6'1"	200	22
	Bill Bryan	End		Dellrose, Tennessee	Massey Military School			
	Kenneth Bryan	Guard			Hume-Fogg H. S.			
13	Tuck Kelly	Guard		Whitesville, Kentucky	University of Kentucky	6'0"	170	25
	Paul Lindsay	Guard		Jacksonville, Florida	Duval H.S.			
8	Fatty Lawrence	Guard		Nashville, Tennessee	Hume-Fogg H.S.	5'7"	195	19
17	Sam Neill	Guard		North Carrollton, Mississippi	Mississippi A & M			
21	Perry Orr	Tackle		Hartselle, Alabama	Morgan County H.S.			
12	Slim Porter	Center		Nashville, Tennessee	Morgan School			
5	Bob Rives	Tackle		Hopkinsville, Kentucky	Hopkinsville H.S.	6'1"	200	19
18	Bo Rowland	End		Arkadelphia, Arkansas	Arkadelphia H.S			20
2	Alfred Sharp	Center		Nashville, Tennessee	Hume-Fogg H.S	6'4"	180	21
14	Hek Wakefield	End		Petersburg, Tennessee	Fitzgerald and Clarke School	5'10"	180	24
10	Jim Walker	Tackle		Birmingham, Alabama				

==== Backfield ====
Number	Player	Position	Games started	Hometown	Prep school	Height	Weight	Age
19	Alvin Bell	Quarterback		Little Rock, Arkansas	Little Rock H. S.		150	22
	Manning Brown	Halfback						
1	Oliver Kuhn	Quarterback	7	Nashville, Tennessee	Montgomery Bell Academy	5'8"	155	25
4	Freddie Meiers	Halfback		Nashville, Tennessee	Georgia Military Academy			
15	S. T. Porter	Fullback		Nashville, Tennessee	Peabody Demonstration School			
11	Gil Reese	Halfback	7	Tupelo, Mississippi	Tupelo H.S.		155	22
20	Red Rountree	Halfback		Hartselle, Alabama	Morgan County H.S.		145	
6	Tom Ryan	Fullback		Houston, Texas	Central H.S	6'1"	190	
	George Waller	Halfback		Bessemer, Alabama	Bessemer H.S.			

=== Scoring leaders ===
Player	Touchdowns	Extra points	Field goals	Points
Gil Reese	10	0	0	60
Hek Wakefield	0	16	2	22
Oliver Kuhn	3	0	0	18
Red Rountree	2	0	0	12
Thomas Ryan	2	0	0	12
Alvin Bell	1	0	0	6
Alfred Sharp	1	0	0	6
S. T. Porter	0	1	0	1
TOTAL	19	17	2	137

=== Depth chart ===
The following chart provides a visual depiction of Vanderbilt's lineup during the 1923 season with games started at the position reflected in parentheses. The chart mimics a short punt formation while on offense, with the quarterback under center.

LE
Lynn Bomar (5)
Bo Rowland (1)
Charles Whitnel (0)

LT	LG	C	RG	RT
Bob Rives (5)	Fatty Lawrence (5)	Alfred Sharp (6)	Tuck Kelly (3)	Jim Walker (5)
Perry Orr (0)	Tuck Kelly (1)	William E. Porter (0)	Kenneth Bryan (2)	Bob Rives (1)
	Paul Lindsay (0)	Albert Roberts (0)	Fatty Lawrence (1)	Francis Council (0)
	John Neil (0)		Sam Neill (0)	

RE
Hek Wakefield (5)
Lynn Bomar (1)
Bill Bryan (0)

QB
Oliver Kuhn (5)
Hek Wakefield (1)
Pep Bell (0)

LHB	RHB
Gil Reese (3)	Red Rountree (5)
Froggie Meiers (2)	Gil Reese (1)
Barker (1)	Manning Brown (0)
Bill Stack (0)	George Waller (0)
Jonas Coverdale (0)	Everett Gibson (0)
Tootie Hughes (0)	Leonard Kirkes (0)
Ray Foster (0)	

FB
Tom Ryan (6)
S. T. Porter (0)

-
