= 1923 Southern Conference football season =

- League: NCAA
- Sport: College football
- Duration: September 29, 1923 through December 1, 1923
- Number of teams: 20

Regular Season
- Season champions: Vanderbilt; Washington & Lee

Football seasons
- ← 1922 1924 →

1923 Southern Conference football standings
	Conf.					Overall
Team	W		L		T	W		L		T
Washington & Lee +	4	–	0	–	1	6	–	3	–	1
Vanderbilt * +	3	–	0	–	1	5	–	2	–	1
VPI	4	–	1	–	0	6	–	3	–	0
Alabama	4	–	1	–	1	7	–	2	–	1
Maryland	2	–	1	–	0	7	–	2	–	1
Florida	1	–	0	–	2	6	–	1	–	2
North Carolina	2	–	1	–	1	5	–	3	–	1
Georgia	3	–	2	–	0	5	–	3	–	1
Mississippi A&M	2	–	1	–	2	5	–	2	–	2
Tennessee	4	–	3	–	0	5	–	4	–	1
Tulane	2	–	2	–	1	6	–	3	–	1
Clemson	1	–	1	–	1	5	–	2	–	1
Georgia Tech	0	–	0	–	4	3	–	2	–	4
NC State	1	–	4	–	0	3	–	7	–	0
Auburn	0	–	1	–	3	3	–	3	–	3
Kentucky	0	–	2	–	2	4	–	3	–	2
Virginia	0	–	3	–	1	3	–	5	–	1
LSU	0	–	3	–	0	3	–	5	–	1
Ole Miss	0	–	4	–	0	4	–	6	–	0
South Carolina	0	–	4	–	0	4	–	6	–	0
+ – Conference co-champions; * co-member of SIAA

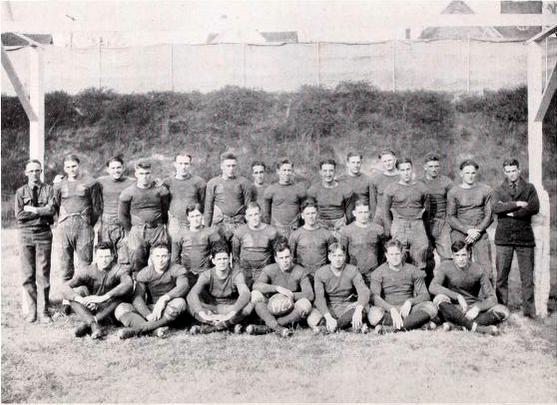
1923 Clemson Tigers football team

The 1923 Southern Conference football season was the college football games played by the member schools of the Southern Conference as part of the 1923 college football season. The season began on September 29. Conference play began with Auburn hosting Clemson. The game was fought to a scoreless tie.

Vanderbilt and Washington & Lee finished the season as conference co-champions. A poll of sportswriters elected Vanderbilt as best team in the south, awarding it the Champ Pickens Trophy.

Vanderbilt end Lynn Bomar was the last of the few southern players selected a first-team All-American by Walter Camp.

Florida's upset of Alabama under new head coach Wallace Wade in the rain opened the door for Vanderbilt's claim to the SoCon title.

== Season overview ==
=== Results and team statistics ===
Conf. Rank	Team	Head coach	Overall record	Conf. record	PPG	PAG
1 (tie)	Washington and Lee	James DeHart	6–3–1	4–0–1	11.7	12.7
1 (tie)	Vanderbilt	Dan McGugin	5–2–1	3–0–1	17.1	**4.1**
3	Florida	James Van Fleet	6–1–2	1–0–2	19.9	6.7
4	VPI	Ben Cubbage	6–3	4–1	12.9	6.1
5	Alabama	Wallace Wade	7–2–1	5–1–1	**22.2**	5.0
6	Tennessee	M. B. Banks	5–4–1	4–3	8.2	16.7
7	Maryland	Curley Byrd	7–2–1	2–1	21.4	5.6
8	Mississippi A&M	Earl Abell	5–2–2	2–1–2	9.2	7.3
9	North Carolina	Bob Fetzer/Bill Fetzer	5–3–1	2–1–1	8.6	9.4
10	Georgia	Kid Woodruff	5–3–1	3–2	8.2	13.3
11	Tulane	Clark Shaughnessy	6–3–1	2–2–1	11.7	8.9
12	Clemson	Bud Saunders	5–2–1	1–1–1	11.4	8.1
13	Georgia Tech	William Alexander	3–2–4	0–0–4	8.3	9.1
14	NC State	Harry Hartsell	3–7	1–4	5.6	13.4
15	Auburn	Boozer Pitts	3–3–3	0–1–3	10.7	6.4
16	Kentucky	J. J. Winn	4–3–2	0–2–2	15.0	5.9
17	Virginia	Greasy Neale	3–5–1	0–3–1	9.7	9.0
18	LSU	Mike Donahue	3–5–1	0–3	11.4	13.4
19 (tie)	Ole Miss	Roland Cowell	4–6	0–4	8.1	14.5
19 (tie)	South Carolina	Sol Metzger	4–6	0–4	10.4	7.7

Key

PPG = Average of points scored per game
PAG = Average of points allowed per game

=== Regular season ===
Index to colors and formatting
Non-conference matchup; SoCon member won
Non-conference matchup; SoCon member lost
Non-conference matchup; tie
Conference matchup

SoCon teams in bold.

==== Week One ====
Date	Visiting team	Home team	Site	Result	Attendance	Reference
September 29	Union (TN)	Alabama	Denny Field • Tuscaloosa, Alabama	**W** 12–0		
September 29	**Auburn**	Clemson	Riggs Field • Calhoun, South Carolina	**T** 0–0		
September 29	Mercer	Georgia	Sanford Field • Athens, Georgia	**W** 7–0		
September 29	Oglethorpe	Georgia Tech	Grant Field • Atlanta	**W** 28–13		
September 29	Marshall	Kentucky	Stoll Field • Lexington, Kentucky	**W** 41–0		
September 29	Northwestern State	LSU	State Field • Baton Rouge, Louisiana	**W** 40–0		
September 29	Randolph-Macon	Maryland	College Park, Maryland	**W** 53–0		
September 29	Wake Forest	North Carolina	Emerson Field • Chapel Hill, North Carolina	**W** 22–0		
September 29	Roanoke	North Carolina State	Riddick Stadium • Raleigh, North Carolina	**W** 6–0		
September 29	Bethel	Ole Miss	Hemingway Stadium • Oxford, Mississippi	**W** 14–6		
September 29	Erskine	South Carolina	Columbia, South Carolina	**W** 35–0		
September 29	Army	Tennessee	Shields–Watkins Field • Knoxville, Tennessee	**L** 41–0		
September 29	Louisiana-Lafayette	Tulane	New Orleans, Louisiana	**W** 20–2		
September 29	Furman	Virginia	Lambeth Field • Charlottesville, Virginia	**L** 13–0		
September 29	Hampden-Sydney	VPI	Blacksburg, Virginia	**W** 29–0		
September 29	McDaniel	Washington & Lee	Wilson Field • Lexington, Virginia	**W** 19–7		

==== Week Two ====
Date	Visiting team	Home team	Site	Result	Attendance	Reference
October 6	**Ole Miss**	**Alabama**	Denny Field • Tuscaloosa, Alabama	**ALA** 56–0		
October 6	Birmingham–Southern	**Auburn**	Montgomery, Alabama	**W** 20–0		
October 6	Newberry	**Clemson**	Riggs Field • Calhoun, South Carolina	**W** 32–0		
October 6	**Florida**	Army	West Point, New York	**L** 20–0		
October 6	Oglethorpe	**Georgia**	Sanford Field • Athens, Georgia	**W** 20–6		
October 6	VMI	**Georgia Tech**	Grant Field • Atlanta	**W** 10–7		
October 6	**Kentucky**	Cincinnati	Cincinnati	**W** 14–0		
October 6	Louisiana-Lafayette	**LSU**	State Field • Baton Rouge, Louisiana	**L** 7–3		
October 6	**Maryland**	Penn	Franklin Field • Philadelphia	**W** 3–0		
October 6	Millsaps	**Mississippi A&M**	Davis Wade Stadium • Starkville, Mississippi	**W** 28–6		
October 6	**North Carolina State**	Penn State	New Beaver Field • University Park, Pennsylvania	**L** 16–0		
October 6	Presbyterian	**South Carolina**	Columbia, South Carolina	**L** 7–3		
October 6	Maryvile	**Tennessee**	Shields–Watkins Field • Knoxville, Tennessee	**T** 14–14		
October 6	Mississippi College	**Tulane**	Second Tulane Stadium • New Orleans, Louisiana	**W** 18–3		
October 6	Howard	**Vanderbilt**	Dudley Field • Nashville, Tennessee	**W** 27–0		
October 6	Richmond	**Virginia**	Lambeth Field • Charlottesville, Virginia	**W** 9–0		
October 6	Davidson	**VPI**	Blacksburg, Virginia	**W** 7–0		

==== Week Three ====
Date	Visiting team	Home team	Site	Result	Attendance	Reference
October 12	**North Carolina**	Duke	Durham, North Carolina	**W** 14–6		
October 13	**Alabama**	Syracuse	Archbold Stadium • Syracuse, New York	**L** 23–0		
October 13	Howard	**Auburn**	Drake Field • Auburn, Alabama	**W** 30–0		
October 13	**Clemson**	Centre	Danville, Kentucky	**L** 28–7		
October 13	**Florida**	**Georgia Tech**	Grant Field • Atlanta	**T** 7–7		
October 13	**Georgia**	Yale	Yale Bowl • New Haven, Connecticut	**L** 40–0		
October 13	Spring Hill	**LSU**	State Field • Baton Rouge, Louisiana	**W** 33–0		
October 13	Richmond	**Maryland**	Washington, D. C.	**W** 23–0		
October 13	Rhodes	**Ole Miss**	Hemingway Stadium • Oxford, Mississippi	**W** 33–0		
October 13	Ouachita	**Mississippi A&M**	Davis Wade Stadium • Starkville, Mississippi	**W** 6–0		
October 13	**South Carolina**	**North Carolina State**	Riddick Stadium • Raleigh, North Carolina	**NCST** 7–0		
October 13	Georgetown (KY)	**Tennessee**	Shields–Watkins Field • Knoxville, Tennessee	**W** 13–6		
October 13	**Tulane**	Texas	Beaumont, Texas	**L** 33–0		
October 13	**Vanderbilt**	Michigan	Ferry Field • Ann Arbor, Michigan	**L** 3–0	30,000	
October 13	St. John's	**Virginia**	Lambeth Field • Charlottesville, Virginia	**W** 32–7		
October 13	**Washington & Lee**	**Kentucky**	Stoll Field • Lexington, Kentucky	**T** 6–6		

==== Week Four ====
Date	Visiting team	Home team	Site	Result	Attendance	Reference
October 18	**North Carolina**	**North Carolina State**	Riddick Stadium • Raleigh, North Carolina	**UNC** 14–0		
October 19	Newberry	**South Carolina**	Columbia, South Carolina	**W** 24–0		
October 20	Sewanee	**Alabama**	Rickwood Field • Birmingham, Alabama	**W** 7–0		
October 20	**Auburn**	Army	Parade Ground • West Point, New York	**L** 28–6		
October 20	Rollins	**Florida**	Fleming Field • Gainesville, Florida	**W** 28–0		
October 20	**Georgia**	**Tennessee**	Shields–Watkins Field • Knoxville, Tennessee	**UGA** 17–0		
October 20	Georgetown	**Georgia Tech**	Grant Field • Atlanta	**W** 20–10		
October 20	Maryville	**Kentucky**	Stoll Field • Lexington, Kentucky	**W** 28–0		
October 20	**VPI**	**Maryland**	Washington, D. C.	**VPI** 16–7		
October 20	**Ole Miss**	**Mississippi A&M**	Jackson, Mississippi	**MSA&M** 13–6		
October 20	Louisiana Tech	**Tulane**	Second Tulane Stadium • New Orleans, Louisiana	**W** 13–7		
October 20	**Vanderbilt**	Texas	Fair Park Stadium • Dallas	**L** 16–0		
October 20	VMI	**Virginia**	Lambeth Field • Charlottesville, Virginia	**L** 35–0		
October 20	St. John's	**Washington & Lee**	Wilson Field • Lexington, Virginia	**W** 28–0		

==== Week Five ====
Date	Visiting team	Home team	Site	Result	Attendance	Reference
October 25	**Clemson**	**South Carolina**	Columbia, South Carolina	**CLEM** 7–6		
October 27	**Alabama**	Spring Hill	Murphy High School Stadium • Mobile, Alabama	**W** 59–0		
October 27	Fort Benning	**Auburn**	Drake Field • Auburn, Alabama	**W** 34–0		
October 27	Wake Forest	**Florida**	Tampa, Florida	**W** 16–7		
October 27	**Georgia Tech**	Notre Dame	South Bend, Indiana	**L** 35–7		
October 27	Georgetown (KY)	**Kentucky**	Stoll Field • Lexington, Kentucky	**W** 35–0		
October 27	Arkansas	**LSU**	Fair Grounds Field • Shreveport, Louisiana	**L** 26–13		
October 27	**Maryland**	**North Carolina**	Emerson Field • Chapel Hill, North Carolina	**MD** 14–0		
October 27	Saint Louis	**Ole Miss**	Hemingway Stadium • Oxford, Mississippi	**L** 28–3		
October 27	**Mississippi A&M**	**Tennessee**	Memphis, Tennessee	**TENN** 7–3		
October 27	**Tulane**	**Vanderbilt**	Dudley Field • Nashville, Tennessee	**VAN** 17–0	10,000	
October 27	Duke	**Virginia**	Lambeth Field • Charlottesville, Virginia	**W** 33–0		
October 27	**North Carolina State**	VMI		**L** 22–7		
October 27	**VPI**	**Washington & Lee**	Lynchburg, Virginia	**W&L** 12–0		

==== Week Six ====
Date	Visiting team	Home team	Site	Result	Attendance	Reference
November 2	**LSU**	Mississippi College	Vicksburg, Mississippi	**T** 0–0		
November 3	**Alabama**	**Georgia Tech**	Grant Field • Atlanta	**T** 0–0		
November 3	**Auburn**	**Georgia**	Memorial Stadium • Columbus, Georgia	**UGA** 7–0		
November 3	Mercer	**Florida**	Fleming Field • Gainesville, Florida	**W** 19–7		
November 3	**Kentucky**	Centre	Danville, Kentucky	**L** 10–0		
November 3	St. John's	**Maryland**	College Park, Maryland	**W** 28–0		
November 3	Birmingham–Southern	**Ole Miss**	Hemingway Stadium • Oxford, Mississippi	**W** 6–0		
November 3	**North Carolina**	**South Carolina**	Columbia, South Carolina	**UNC** 13–0		
November 3	**Tulane**	**Tennessee**	Shields–Watkins Field • Knoxville, Tennessee	**TENN** 13–2		
November 3	**Mississippi A&M**	**Vanderbilt**	Dudley Field • Nashville, Tennessee	**T** 0–0		
November 3	**Clemson**	**VPI**	Blacksburg, Virginia	**VPI** 25–0		
November 3	**Virginia**	**Washington & Lee**	Wilson Field • Lexington, Virginia	**W&L** 7–0		

==== Week Seven ====
Date	Visiting team	Home team	Site	Result	Attendance	Reference
November 9	Davidson	**Clemson**	Riggs Field • Calhoun, South Carolina	**W** 12–0		
November 10	**Kentucky**	**Alabama**	Denny Field • Tuscaloosa, Alabama	**ALA** 16–8		
November 10	**Tulane**	**Auburn**	Montgomery, Alabama	**T** 6–6		
November 10	**Florida**	Stetson		**W** 27–0		
November 10	**Virginia**	**Georgia**	Sanford Field • Athens, Georgia	**UGA** 13–0		
November 10	**Georgia Tech**	Penn State	New Beaver Field • University Park, Pennsylvania	**L** 7–0		
November 10	**Maryland**	Yale	New Haven, Connecticut	**L** 16–14		
November 10	**Ole Miss**	Mississippi College	Meridian, Mississippi	**L** 6–0		
November 10	Union (TN)	**Mississippi A&M**	Davis Wade Stadium • Starkville, Mississippi	**W** 6–0		
November 10	**North Carolina**	VMI	Richmond, Virginia	**L** 9–0		
November 10	**North Carolina State**	**VPI**	Norfolk, Virginia	**VPI** 16–0		
November 10	**South Carolina**	Furman	Manly Field • Greenville, South Carolina	**L** 23–3		
November 10	**Tennessee**	**Vanderbilt**	Dudley Field • Nashville, Tennessee	**VAN** 51–7		
November 10	**Washington & Lee**	West Virginia	Charleston, West Virginia	**L** 63–0		

==== Week Eight ====
Date	Visiting team	Home team	Site	Result	Attendance	Reference
November 15	The Citadel	**South Carolina**	County Fairgrounds • Orangeburg, South Carolina	**W** 12–0		
November 16	**LSU**	**Alabama**	Montgomery, Alabama	**ALA** 30–3		
November 17	Centre	**Auburn**	Rickwood Field • Birmingham, Alabama	**L** 17–0		
November 17	Presbyterian	**Clemson**	Riggs Field • Calhoun, South Carolina	**W** 20–0		
November 17	**Florida**	Florida-Southern	Lakeland, Florida	**W** 53–0		
November 17	**Georgia Tech**	**Kentucky**	Stoll Field • Lexington, Kentucky	**T** 3–3		
November 17	**Maryland**	**North Carolina State**	Riddick Stadium • Raleigh, North Carolina	**MD** 26–12		
November 17	Davidson	**North Carolina**	Charlotte, North Carolina	**W** 14–3		
November 17	**Ole Miss**	**Tulane**	Second Tulane Stadium • New Orleans	**TUL** 19–0		
November 17	VMI	**Tennessee**	Shields–Watkins Field • Knoxville, Tennessee	**L** 33–0		
November 17	**Georgia**	**Vanderbilt**	Dudley Field • Nashville, Tennessee	**VAN** 35–7	15,000	
November 17	**VPI**	**Virginia**	Lambeth Field • Charlottesville, Virginia	**VPI** 6–3		
November 17	**Washington & Lee**	**South Carolina**	Columbia, South Carolina	**W&L** 13–7		

==== Week Nine ====
Date	Visiting team	Home team	Site	Result	Attendance	Reference
November 24	**Georgia**	**Alabama**	Cramton Bowl • Montgomery, Alabama	**ALA** 36–0		
November 24	Catholic	**Maryland**	Byrd Stadium • College Park, Maryland	**W** 40–6		
November 24	**Mississippi A&M**	**Florida**	Barrs Field • Jacksonville, Florida	**T** 13–13		
November 24	**Ole Miss**	**Tennessee**	Shields–Watkins Field • Knoxville, Tennessee	**TENN** 10–0		
November 24	**North Carolina State**	Wake Forest	Wake Forest, North Carolina	**L** 14–0		
November 24	**LSU**	**Tulane**	Second Tulane Stadium • New Orleans	**TUL** 20–0		
November 24	Sewanee	**Vanderbilt**	Dudley Field • Nashville, Tennessee	**W** 7–0	15,000	
November 24	**Washington & Lee**	Centre	Louisville, Kentucky	**L** 19–0		

==== Week Ten ====
Date	Visiting team	Home team	Site	Result	Attendance	Reference
November 29	**Florida**	**Alabama**	Rickwood Field • Birmingham, Alabama	**FLA** 16–6		
November 29	**Auburn**	**Georgia Tech**	Grant Field • Atlanta	**T** 0–0		
November 29	**Clemson**	Furman	Manly Field • Greenville, South Carolina	**W** 7–6		
November 29	**Maryland**	Johns Hopkins	Baltimore, Maryland	**T** 6–6		
November 29	**North Carolina**	**Virginia**	Lambeth Field • Charlottesville, Virginia	**T** 0–0		
November 29	**Tennessee**	**Kentucky**	Stoll Field • Lexington, Kentucky	**TENN** 18–0		
November 29	Wake Forest	**South Carolina**	Columbia, South Carolina	**W** 14–7		
November 29	Washington (MO)	**Tulane**	Second Tulane Stadium • New Orleans, Louisiana	**W** 19–8		
November 29	VMI	**VPI**	Roanoke, Virginia	**L** 6–0	14,000	
November 29	**North Carolina State**	**Washington & Lee**	Norfolk, Virginia	**W&L** 20–12		
December 1	Centre	**Georgia**	Sanford Field • Athens, Georgia	**T** 3–3		
December 1	**Ole Miss**	Fort Benning	Columbus, Georgia	**W** 19–7		
December 1	**LSU**	**Mississippi A&M**	Davis Wade Stadium • Starkville, Mississippi	**MSA&M** 14–7		

== Awards and honors ==
=== All-Americans ===
- E – Lynn Bomar, Vanderbilt (AW-2; WC-1; FW)
- E – Hek Wakefield, Vanderbilt (NB-2; DW-1, BE)
- T – Joe Bennett, Georgia (BE)
- T – Robbie Robinson, Florida (BE)
- G – Goldy Goldstein, Florida (BE)
- G – Tuck Kelly, Vanderbilt (BE)
- C – Clyde Propst, Alabama (BE)
- C – Claire Frye, Georgia Tech (BE)
- HB – Gil Reese, Vanderbilt (DW-3, BE)
- FB – Doug Wycoff, Georgia Tech (BE)

=== All-Southern team ===
The following were the selections for the composite All-Southern team put out by the Atlanta Journal, all of whom received gold medals.

Position	Name	First-team selectors	Team
QB	Grant Gillis	AJ	Alabama
HB	Gil Reese	AJ	Vanderbilt
HB	Ark Newton	AJ	Florida
FB	Doug Wycoff	AJ	Georgia Tech
E	Lynn Bomar	AJ	Vanderbilt
T	Joe Bennett	AJ	Georgia
G	Goldy Goldstein	AJ	Florida
C	Clyde Propst	AJ	Alabama
G	Tuck Kelly	AJ	Vanderbilt
T	Robbie Robinson	AJ	Florida
E	Hek Wakefield	AJ	Vanderbilt
