= Bill Oliver (guard) =

American football player (1902–1932)

No. 16
- Position: Guard

Personal information
- Born: February 16, 1902; Panola, Alabama, U.S.
- Died: May 6, 1932 (aged 30); Panola, Alabama, U.S.
- Listed height: 5 ft 11 in (1.80 m)
- Listed weight: 180 lb (82 kg)

Career information
- High school: Marion Military Institute (Marion, Alabama)
- College: Alabama (1921–1925)

Career history
- New York Yankees (1926–1927)

Awards and highlights
- National champion (1925)

Career statistics
- Games played: 13
- Games started: 12
- Stats at Pro Football Reference

William "Country" Seth Oliver Jr. (February 16, 1902 – May 6, 1932) was an American professional football tackle for the New York Yankees of the American Football League (AFL) and National Football League (NFL). He played college football for the Alabama Crimson Tide.

== Early life ==
Oliver was born on February 16, 1902, in Panola, Alabama. He attended Marion Military Institute in Marion, Alabama.

== College career ==
Oliver played college football for the Alabama Crimson Tide from 1921 to 1925 and was a letterman from 1922 to 1923 and in 1925. He played at guard and retroactively earned a national championship in 1925. Oliver also played on the baseball team in the outfield.

== Professional career ==
On September 16, 1926, Oliver signed with the New York Yankees of the American Football League (AFL). He played in 11 games and started in eight at guard. Oliver remained with the team as they joined the National Football League (NFL) where he played in 13 games and started in 12. On August 1, 1928, he became a free agent.

== Later life and death ==
After his playing career ended, Oliver worked as a car salesman in Birmingham, Alabama. On May 6, 1932 in Panola, he shot his girlfriend, Lottie Simmons, once in the side and once in the head with a shotgun. Oliver then dumped her body on the side of the road and went to his home. Once he arrived, he told his brother, Clate Oliver, to go to the side the car and said, "I'm going to kill you. Step down". Clate reportedly backed away from the car and was shot in the abdomen. Oliver then entered the house through the back and shot himself in heart. The Birmingham News reported that he suffered a nervous breakdown a few months earlier to the incident and eventually resigned from his salesman position.
