= 1923 Tulsa Golden Hurricane football team =

American college football season

1923 Tulsa Golden Hurricane football
- Conference: Oklahoma Intercollegiate Conference
- Record: 2–5–1 (0–0 OIC)
- Head coach: Howard Acher (2nd season)
- Home stadium: McNulty Park

1923 Southern college football independents records
| | Conf. | | | Overall |
| Team | W | L | T | W | | L | | T |
|---|---|---|---|---|---|---|---|---|
| Davis & Elkins | | – | | 8 | – | 0 | – | 0 |
| King | | – | | 8 | – | 0 | – | 1 |
| VMI | | – | | 9 | – | 1 | – | 0 |
| Tennessee Docs | | – | | 6 | – | 0 | – | 2 |
| Abilene Christian | | – | | 6 | – | 1 | – | 0 |
| West Virginia | | – | | 7 | – | 1 | – | 1 |
| Middle Tennessee State Normal | | – | | 4 | – | 1 | – | 0 |
| Loyola (LA) | | – | | 5 | – | 1 | – | 1 |
| Quantico Marines | | – | | 7 | – | 2 | – | 1 |
| Navy | | – | | 5 | – | 1 | – | 3 |
| Stetson | | – | | 5 | – | 2 | – | 0 |
| Wake Forest | | – | | 6 | – | 3 | – | 0 |
| West Tennessee State Normal | | – | | 6 | – | 3 | – | 0 |
| William & Mary | | – | | 6 | – | 3 | – | 0 |
| Louisville | | – | | 5 | – | 3 | – | 0 |
| Delaware | | – | | 5 | – | 3 | – | 1 |
| Trinity (NC) | | – | | 5 | – | 4 | – | 0 |
| Western Kentucky State Normal | | – | | 5 | – | 4 | – | 0 |
| Union (TN) | | – | | 4 | – | 4 | – | 1 |
| Catholic University | | – | | 4 | – | 4 | – | 0 |
| Mississippi Normal | | – | | 3 | – | 3 | – | 0 |
| Texas Mines | | – | | 3 | – | 4 | – | 0 |
| Richmond | | – | | 3 | – | 5 | – | 0 |
| Georgetown | | – | | 3 | – | 6 | – | 0 |
| East Tennessee State Normal | | – | | 3 | – | 6 | – | 0 |
| Davidson | | – | | 3 | – | 7 | – | 0 |
| George Washington | | – | | 2 | – | 8 | – | 0 |
| Birmingham–Southern | | – | | 1 | – | 5 | – | 2 |
| Marshall | | – | | 1 | – | 7 | – | 0 |
| Spring Hill | | – | | 1 | – | 7 | – | 0 |

The 1923 Tulsa Golden Hurricane football team represented the University of Tulsa during the 1923 college football season. In their second year under head coach Howard Acher, the Golden Hurricane compiled a 2–5–1 record and were outscored by their opponents by a combined total of 165 to 107. The team ended its season with a 20–0 victory over Des Moines, and then a 35–0 loss to Haskell.

== Schedule ==
| Date | Opponent | Site | Result | Attendance | Source |
|---|---|---|---|---|---|
| October 11 | Arkansas Tech | McNulty Park; Tulsa, OK | L 7–50 | | |
| October 27 | St. Edward's | McNulty Park; Tulsa, OK | L 3–14 | | |
| November 3 | at Tennessee Docs | Russwood Park; Memphis, TN | T 6–6 | | |
| November 10 | St. John's (KS) | McNulty Park; Tulsa, OK | W 60–0 | | |
| November 16 | at Austin | Sherman, TX | L 7–13 | | |
| November 24 | at Georgetown | Griffith Stadium; Washington, DC | L 0–26 | | |
| December 1 | Des Moines | McNulty Park; Tulsa, OK | W 20–0 | | |
| December 8 | Haskell | McNulty Park; Tulsa, OK | L 0–35 | 5,000 | |
