= 1923 Tennessee State football team =

American college football season

1923 Tennessee State football
- Conference: Independent
- Record: 3–2
- Captain: Nance
- Home stadium: Athletic Park

1923 Southern college football independents records
	Conf.			Overall
Team	W	L	T	W		L		T
Davis & Elkins		–		8	–	0	–	0
King		–		8	–	0	–	1
VMI		–		9	–	1	–	0
Tennessee Docs		–		6	–	0	–	2
Abilene Christian		–		6	–	1	–	0
West Virginia		–		7	–	1	–	1
Middle Tennessee State Normal		–		4	–	1	–	0
Loyola (LA)		–		5	–	1	–	1
Quantico Marines		–		7	–	2	–	1
Navy		–		5	–	1	–	3
Stetson		–		5	–	2	–	0
Wake Forest		–		6	–	3	–	0
West Tennessee State Normal		–		6	–	3	–	0
William & Mary		–		6	–	3	–	0
Louisville		–		5	–	3	–	0
Delaware		–		5	–	3	–	1
Tennessee State		–		3	–	2	–	0
Trinity (NC)		–		5	–	4	–	0
Western Kentucky State Normal		–		5	–	4	–	0
Union (TN)		–		4	–	4	–	1
Catholic University		–		4	–	4	–	0
Mississippi Normal		–		3	–	3	–	0
Texas Mines		–		3	–	4	–	0
Richmond		–		3	–	5	–	0
Georgetown		–		3	–	6	–	0
East Tennessee State Normal		–		3	–	6	–	0
Davidson		–		3	–	7	–	0
George Washington		–		2	–	8	–	0
Birmingham–Southern		–		1	–	5	–	2
Marshall		–		1	–	7	–	0
Spring Hill		–		1	–	7	–	0

The 1923 Tennessee State football team represented the Tennessee Agricultural & Industrial State Normal School for Negroes—now known as Tennessee State University—an independent during the 1923 college football season. Tennessee State compiled a record of 3–2.

== Schedule ==
Date	Time	Opponent	Site	Result	Source
October 20		at Knoxville	Knoxville Stadium; Knoxville, TN	W 12–0	
October 27		at Atlanta	Atlanta, GA	L 0–12	
November 10		Roger Williams (TN)	Athletic Park; Nashville, TN	W 13–0	
November 17	2:30 p.m.	Morris Brown	Athletic Park; Nashville, TN	L 3–7	
November 24		Walden (TN)	Athletic Park; Nashville, TN	W 19–14	
All times are in Central time
