= 1923 Roanoke Maroons football team =

American college football season

1923 Roanoke Maroons football
- Conference: Virginia–North Carolina Intercollegiate Athletic Conference
- Record: 6–2 (4–0 V–NCIAC)
- Head coach: Pinky Spruhan (10th season)
- Home stadium: College Field; Roanoke Fair Grounds

The 1923 Roanoke Maroons football team represented Roanoke College as a member of the Virginia–North Carolina Intercollegiate Athletic Conference (V–NCIAC) during the 1923 college football season. Led by 10th-year head coach Pinky Spruhan, the Maroons compiled an overall record of 6–2, with a mark of 4–0 in conference play.

== Schedule ==
Date	Opponent	Site	Result	Source
September 29	at NC State*	Riddick Stadium; Raleigh, NC	L 0–6	
October 6	Lenoir	College Field; Salem, VA	W 67–0	
October 13	at VMI*	VMI Parade Ground; Lexington, VA	L 6–27	
October 20	Randolph–Macon	College Field; Salem, VA	W 66–0	
October 27	at Hampden–Sydney	Hampden-Sydney, VA	W 13–0	
November 3	Catholic University*	College Field; Salem, VA	W 14–0	
November 12	George Washington*	Fair Grounds; Roanoke, VA	W 33–0	
November 17	William & Mary	Fair Grounds; Roanoke, VA	W 9–7	
*Non-conference game
