= Jack C. Vowell =

American football player and sports coach (1899–1969)

Biographical details
- Born: July 24, 1899; Sherman, Texas, U.S.
- Died: September 16, 1969 (aged 70); El Paso, Texas, U.S.
- Education: Virginia Military Institute

Playing career

Football
- 1920–1921: Texas

Coaching career (HC unless noted)

Football
- 1922–1923: Texas Mines

Basketball
- 1923–1924: Texas Mines

Head coaching record
- Overall: 8–8 (football); 3–10 (basketball)

Jack Caruthers Vowell Sr. (July 24, 1899 – September 16, 1969) was an American football player and coach of football and basketball.

Vowell was born in Sherman, Texas in 1899 and his family moved to El Paso in 1908 where he attended El Paso High School and then the Virginia Military Institute.

While studying law at the University of Texas at Austin, he played college football for the Longhorns in 1920 and 1921, helping the team to win the 1920 Southwest Conference Championship.

After leaving UT, Vowell served as the head football coach the College of Mines and Metallurgy of the University of Texas—now known as the University of Texas at El Paso (UTEP)—from 1922 to 1923, compiling a record of 8–8. He was also the head basketball coach at Texas Mines in 1923–24, tallying a mark of 3–10.

In 1927 he entered the contracting business. After working for several other companies, he organized the Vowell Construction Company and Vowell Material Company in 1945 and was president of both until his death. He was an active civic leader in the El Paso community serving as Chairman of the Board of the Southwestern International Livestock Show and Rodeo and on the Boards of the El Paso Chamber of Commerce, Goodwill and the El Paso Heart Association. He was a local and national leader of the Boy Scouts of America and was awarded the Silver Beaver, Silver Antelope and Silver Buffalo awards.

He died of natural causes in his home on 16 September 1969.

He married Daurice Hurt McDaniel on 24 July 1922, in El Paso, Texas, and his son, Jack Caruthers Vowell Jr., served 7 terms in the Texas Legislature until his retirement in 1994.

== Head coaching record ==
=== Football ===
Year	Team	Overall	Conference	Standing	Bowl/playoffs
Texas Mines Miners (Independent) (1922–1923)
1922	Texas Mines	5–4			
1923	Texas Mines	3–4			
Texas Mines:		8–8			
Total:		8–8			

=== Basketball ===
Record table
Season	Team	Overall	Conference	Standing	Postseason
Texas Mines Miners (Independent) (1923–1924)
1923–24	Texas Mines	3-10			
Total:		3–10 (.231)			
