= Harrison Briggs =

Playing career

Baseball
- 1913: New Bedford Whalers

Coaching career (HC unless noted)

Football
- 1921: Allegheny HS (PA)
- 1923: Marshall

Baseball
- 1924: Marshall

Head coaching record
- Overall: 1–7 (college football); 7–2 (college baseball)

Harrison R. Briggs was an American minor league baseball player and a college football and college baseball coach. He served as the head football coach at Marshall University in Huntington, West Virginia in 1923.

== Head coaching record ==
=== Football ===
Year	Team	Overall	Conference	Standing	Bowl/playoffs
Marshall Thundering Herd (Independent) (1923)
1923	Marshall	1–7			
Marshall:		1–7			
Total:		1–7			

=== Baseball ===
Record table
Season	Team	Overall	Conference	Standing	Postseason
Marshall Thundering Herd (Independent) (1924)
1924	Marshall	7–2			
Marshall:		7–2			
Total:		7–2			
