= 1923 West Tennessee State Normal football team =

American college football season

1923 West Tennessee State Normal football
- Conference: Independent
- Record: 6–3
- Head coach: Lester Barnard (2nd season)
- Captain: Ray Neal
- Home stadium: Russwood Park, Hodges Field

1923 Southern college football independents records
	Conf.			Overall
Team	W	L	T	W		L		T
Davis & Elkins		–		8	–	0	–	0
King		–		8	–	0	–	1
VMI		–		9	–	1	–	0
Tennessee Docs		–		6	–	0	–	2
Abilene Christian		–		6	–	1	–	0
West Virginia		–		7	–	1	–	1
Middle Tennessee State Normal		–		4	–	1	–	0
Loyola (LA)		–		5	–	1	–	1
Quantico Marines		–		7	–	2	–	1
Navy		–		5	–	1	–	3
Stetson		–		5	–	2	–	0
Wake Forest		–		6	–	3	–	0
West Tennessee State Normal		–		6	–	3	–	0
William & Mary		–		6	–	3	–	0
Louisville		–		5	–	3	–	0
Delaware		–		5	–	3	–	1
Trinity (NC)		–		5	–	4	–	0
Western Kentucky State Normal		–		5	–	4	–	0
Union (TN)		–		4	–	4	–	1
Catholic University		–		4	–	4	–	0
Mississippi Normal		–		3	–	3	–	0
Texas Mines		–		3	–	4	–	0
Richmond		–		3	–	5	–	0
Georgetown		–		3	–	6	–	0
East Tennessee State Normal		–		3	–	6	–	0
Davidson		–		3	–	7	–	0
George Washington		–		2	–	8	–	0
Birmingham–Southern		–		1	–	5	–	2
Marshall		–		1	–	7	–	0
Spring Hill		–		1	–	7	–	0

The 1923 West Tennessee State Normal football team was an American football team that represented West Tennessee State Normal School (now known as the University of Memphis) as an independent during the 1923 college football season. In their second season under head coach Lester Barnard, West Tennessee State Normal compiled a 6–3 record.

== Schedule ==
Date	Time	Opponent	Site	Result	Attendance	Source
September 29	2:30 p.m.	at Southwest Missouri State Teachers	Kingshighway gridiron; Springfield, MO	L 0–20	2,500	
October 6	3:15 p.m.	vs. Tennessee Docs	Russwood Park; Memphis, TN	L 7–19	1,500	
October 12	3:00 p.m.	Bethel (TN)	Russwood Park; Memphis, TN	W 12–0		
October 19		at Hendrix	Conway, AR	W 9–6		
October 27		at Jonesboro Aggies	Jonesboro, AR (rivalry)	W 6–0		
November 3		at Little Rock	Little Rock, AR	L 0–3		
November 9	2:15 p.m.	Southwestern Presbyterian	Russwood Park; Memphis, TN	W 13–0		
November 16		Mississippi Heights Academy	Hodges Field; Memphis, TN	W 14–0		
November 29		at Arkansas Normal	Estes Field; Conway, AR	W 12–7		
All times are in Central time
