= 1923 Tennessee Docs football team =

American college football season

1923 Tennessee Docs football
- Conference: Independent
- Record: 6–0–2
- Head coach: Bill Brennan (2nd season)
- Home stadium: Russwood Park

1923 Southern college football independents records
	Conf.			Overall
Team	W	L	T	W		L		T
Davis & Elkins		–		8	–	0	–	0
King		–		8	–	0	–	1
VMI		–		9	–	1	–	0
Tennessee Docs		–		6	–	0	–	2
Abilene Christian		–		6	–	1	–	0
West Virginia		–		7	–	1	–	1
Middle Tennessee State Normal		–		4	–	1	–	0
Loyola (LA)		–		5	–	1	–	1
Quantico Marines		–		7	–	2	–	1
Navy		–		5	–	1	–	3
Stetson		–		5	–	2	–	0
Wake Forest		–		6	–	3	–	0
West Tennessee State Normal		–		6	–	3	–	0
William & Mary		–		6	–	3	–	0
Louisville		–		5	–	3	–	0
Delaware		–		5	–	3	–	1
Trinity (NC)		–		5	–	4	–	0
Western Kentucky State Normal		–		5	–	4	–	0
Union (TN)		–		4	–	4	–	1
Catholic University		–		4	–	4	–	0
Mississippi Normal		–		3	–	3	–	0
Texas Mines		–		3	–	4	–	0
Richmond		–		3	–	5	–	0
Georgetown		–		3	–	6	–	0
East Tennessee State Normal		–		3	–	6	–	0
Davidson		–		3	–	7	–	0
George Washington		–		2	–	8	–	0
Birmingham–Southern		–		1	–	5	–	2
Marshall		–		1	–	7	–	0
Spring Hill		–		1	–	7	–	0

The 1923 Tennessee Docs football team (variously "Docs", "UT Doctors" or the "Tennessee Medicos") represented the University of Tennessee College of Medicine in Memphis in the 1923 college football season.

== Schedule ==
Date	Time	Opponent	Site	Result	Attendance	Source
October 6	3:15 p.m.	vs. West Tennessee State Normal	Russwood Park; Memphis, TN	W 19–7	1,500	
October 13		Union (TN)	Russwood Park; Memphis, TN	W 14–0		
October 20		Southwestern (TN)	Russwood Park; Memphis, TN	W 55–0		
October 27		vs. Carson–Newman	Shields-Watkins Field; Knoxville, TN	W 7–0		
November 3		Tulsa	Russwood Park; Memphis, TN	T 6–6		
November 10		at Loyola (LA)	Loyola Stadium; New Orleans, LA	T 0–0		
November 17		Cumberland (TN)	Russwood Park; Memphis, TN	W 14–0		
November 29		Wabash	Russwood Park; Memphis, TN	W 6–0		
All times are in Central time
