= 1923 Georgetown Blue and Gray football team =

American college football season

1923 Georgetown Blue and Gray football
- Conference: Independent
- Record: 3–6
- Head coach: Jackie Maloney (1st season)
- Captain: Paul Florence
- Home stadium: Griffith Stadium

1923 Southern college football independents records
	Conf.			Overall
Team	W	L	T	W		L		T
Davis & Elkins		–		8	–	0	–	0
King		–		8	–	0	–	1
VMI		–		9	–	1	–	0
Tennessee Docs		–		6	–	0	–	2
Abilene Christian		–		6	–	1	–	0
West Virginia		–		7	–	1	–	1
Middle Tennessee State Normal		–		4	–	1	–	0
Loyola (LA)		–		5	–	1	–	1
Quantico Marines		–		7	–	2	–	1
Navy		–		5	–	1	–	3
Stetson		–		5	–	2	–	0
Wake Forest		–		6	–	3	–	0
West Tennessee State Normal		–		6	–	3	–	0
William & Mary		–		6	–	3	–	0
Louisville		–		5	–	3	–	0
Delaware		–		5	–	3	–	1
Tennessee State		–		3	–	2	–	0
Trinity (NC)		–		5	–	4	–	0
Western Kentucky State Normal		–		5	–	4	–	0
Union (TN)		–		4	–	4	–	1
Catholic University		–		4	–	4	–	0
Mississippi Normal		–		3	–	3	–	0
Texas Mines		–		3	–	4	–	0
Richmond		–		3	–	5	–	0
Georgetown		–		3	–	6	–	0
East Tennessee State Normal		–		3	–	6	–	0
Davidson		–		3	–	7	–	0
George Washington		–		2	–	8	–	0
Birmingham–Southern		–		1	–	5	–	2
Marshall		–		1	–	7	–	0
Spring Hill		–		1	–	7	–	0

The 1923 Georgetown Blue and Gray football team represented Georgetown University as an independent during the 1923 college football season. Led by Jackie Maloney in his first and only year as head coach, the team went 3–6.

== Schedule ==
Date	Time	Opponent	Site	Result	Attendance	Source
September 29		George Washington	Griffith Stadium; Washington, DC	W 20–0		
October 6		Quantico Marines	Griffith Stadium; Washington, DC	L 3–14	16,000	
October 13		at Princeton	Palmer Stadium; Princeton, NJ	L 0–17	10,000	
October 20		at Georgia Tech	Grant Field; Atlanta, GA	L 10–20	10,000	
October 27		Third Army Corps	Griffith Stadium; Washington, DC	L 7–14		
November 3	2:00 p.m.	at Boston College	Braves Field; Boston, MA	L 0–21	15,000	
November 17		Bucknell	Griffith Stadium; Washington, DC	L 7–14		
November 24		Tulsa	Griffith Stadium; Washington, DC	W 26–0		
December 1		at Fordham	Yankee Stadium; Bronx, NY	W 6–0		
