= 1923 Union (Tennessee) Bulldogs football team =

American college football season

1923 Union (Tennessee) Bulldogs football
- Conference: Independent
- Record: 4–4–1
- Head coach: Joe Guyon (2nd season)
- Home stadium: Jackson Athletic Park

1923 Southern college football independents records
	Conf.			Overall
Team	W	L	T	W		L		T
Davis & Elkins		–		8	–	0	–	0
King		–		8	–	0	–	1
VMI		–		9	–	1	–	0
Tennessee Docs		–		6	–	0	–	2
Abilene Christian		–		6	–	1	–	0
West Virginia		–		7	–	1	–	1
Middle Tennessee State Normal		–		4	–	1	–	0
Loyola (LA)		–		5	–	1	–	1
Quantico Marines		–		7	–	2	–	1
Navy		–		5	–	1	–	3
Stetson		–		5	–	2	–	0
Wake Forest		–		6	–	3	–	0
West Tennessee State Normal		–		6	–	3	–	0
William & Mary		–		6	–	3	–	0
Louisville		–		5	–	3	–	0
Delaware		–		5	–	3	–	1
Tennessee State		–		3	–	2	–	0
Trinity (NC)		–		5	–	4	–	0
Western Kentucky State Normal		–		5	–	4	–	0
Union (TN)		–		4	–	4	–	1
Catholic University		–		4	–	4	–	0
Mississippi Normal		–		3	–	3	–	0
Texas Mines		–		3	–	4	–	0
Richmond		–		3	–	5	–	0
Georgetown		–		3	–	6	–	0
East Tennessee State Normal		–		3	–	6	–	0
Davidson		–		3	–	7	–	0
George Washington		–		2	–	8	–	0
Birmingham–Southern		–		1	–	5	–	2
Marshall		–		1	–	7	–	0
Spring Hill		–		1	–	7	–	0

The 1923 Union Bulldogs football team was an American football team that represented Union University of Jackson, Tennessee as an independent during the 1923 college football season. Led by Joe Guyon in his second season as head coach, the Bulldogs compiled an overall record of 4–4–1.

== Schedule ==
Date	Opponent	Site	Result	Source
September 29	at Alabama	Denny Field; Tuscaloosa, AL	L 0–12	
October 6	Louisville	Jackson Athletic Park; Jackson, TN	W 14–6	
October 13	at Tennessee Docs	Russwood Park; Memphis, TN	L 0–14	
October 20	Second District Agricultural	Jackson Athletic Park; Jackson, TN	L 6–13	
October 27	Howard (AL)	Jackson Athletic Park; Jackson, TN	T 0–0	
November 2	at Hendrix	Conway, AR	W 27–14	
November 10	at Mississippi A&M	Scott Field; Starkville, MS	L 0–6	
November 23	Missouri Osteopathic	Jackson Athletic Park; Jackson, TN	W 39–0	
November 29	at Spring Hill	Monroe Park; Mobile, AL	W 13–0	
