= 1923 Navy Midshipmen football team =

American college football season

1923 Navy Midshipmen football

Rose Bowl, T 14–14 vs. Washington
- Conference: Independent
- Record: 5–1–3
- Head coach: Bob Folwell (4th season)
- Captain: Arthur Carney
- Home stadium: Worden Field

1923 Southern college football independents records
	Conf.			Overall
Team	W	L	T	W		L		T
Davis & Elkins		–		8	–	0	–	0
King		–		8	–	0	–	1
VMI		–		9	–	1	–	0
Tennessee Docs		–		6	–	0	–	2
Abilene Christian		–		6	–	1	–	0
West Virginia		–		7	–	1	–	1
Middle Tennessee State Normal		–		4	–	1	–	0
Loyola (LA)		–		5	–	1	–	1
Quantico Marines		–		7	–	2	–	1
Navy		–		5	–	1	–	3
Stetson		–		5	–	2	–	0
Wake Forest		–		6	–	3	–	0
West Tennessee State Normal		–		6	–	3	–	0
William & Mary		–		6	–	3	–	0
Louisville		–		5	–	3	–	0
Delaware		–		5	–	3	–	1
Tennessee State		–		3	–	2	–	0
Trinity (NC)		–		5	–	4	–	0
Western Kentucky State Normal		–		5	–	4	–	0
Union (TN)		–		4	–	4	–	1
Catholic University		–		4	–	4	–	0
Mississippi Normal		–		3	–	3	–	0
Texas Mines		–		3	–	4	–	0
Richmond		–		3	–	5	–	0
Georgetown		–		3	–	6	–	0
East Tennessee State Normal		–		3	–	6	–	0
Davidson		–		3	–	7	–	0
George Washington		–		2	–	8	–	0
Birmingham–Southern		–		1	–	5	–	2
Marshall		–		1	–	7	–	0
Spring Hill		–		1	–	7	–	0

The 1923 Navy Midshipmen football team represented the United States Naval Academy during the 1923 college football season. In their fourth season under head coach Bob Folwell, the Midshipmen compiled a 5–1–3 record, shut out three opponents, and outscored all opponents by a combined score of 168 to 62.

The annual Army–Navy Game was played on November 25 at the Polo Grounds in New York City and the teams played to a scoreless tie. Navy was invited to play in the Rose Bowl on New Year's Day, and played Washington to a 14–14 tie.

== Schedule ==
Date	Time	Opponent	Site	Result	Attendance	Source
September 29		William & Mary	Worden Field; Annapolis, MD	W 39–10		
October 6		Dickinson	Worden Field; Annapolis, MD	W 13–7		
October 13		West Virginia Wesleyan	Worden Field; Annapolis, MD	W 26–7		
October 20		Penn State	New Beaver Field; State College, PA	L 3–21	20,000	
October 27	2:30 p.m.	vs. Princeton	Baltimore Stadium; Baltimore, MD	T 3–3	45,000	
November 3		Colgate	Worden Field; Annapolis, MD	W 9–0		
November 10		St. Xavier	Worden Field; Annapolis, MD	W 61–0		
November 24		vs. Army	Polo Grounds; New York, NY (Army–Navy Game)	T 0–0	66,000	
January 1, 1924		vs. Washington	Rose Bowl; Pasadena, CA (Rose Bowl)	T 14–14	45,000	
All times are in Eastern time
