= Mississippi Heights Academy =

Educational institution in Mississippi

Mississippi Heights Academy was a institution of learning designed to prepare boys for entrance to college or university located in Blue Mountain, Mississippi. Founded in 1904 by Dr. B. G. Lowrey, it closed in 1943.
