= 1923 Louisville Cardinals football team =

American college football season

1923 Louisville Cardinals football
- Conference: Independent
- Record: 5–3
- Head coach: Fred Enke (1st season)
- Captain: Art Vandevert
- Home stadium: Parkway Field

1923 Southern college football independents records
	Conf.			Overall
Team	W	L	T	W		L		T
Davis & Elkins		–		8	–	0	–	0
King		–		8	–	0	–	1
VMI		–		9	–	1	–	0
Tennessee Docs		–		6	–	0	–	2
Abilene Christian		–		6	–	1	–	0
West Virginia		–		7	–	1	–	1
Middle Tennessee State Normal		–		4	–	1	–	0
Loyola (LA)		–		5	–	1	–	1
Quantico Marines		–		7	–	2	–	1
Navy		–		5	–	1	–	3
Stetson		–		5	–	2	–	0
Wake Forest		–		6	–	3	–	0
West Tennessee State Normal		–		6	–	3	–	0
William & Mary		–		6	–	3	–	0
Louisville		–		5	–	3	–	0
Delaware		–		5	–	3	–	1
Tennessee State		–		3	–	2	–	0
Trinity (NC)		–		5	–	4	–	0
Western Kentucky State Normal		–		5	–	4	–	0
Union (TN)		–		4	–	4	–	1
Catholic University		–		4	–	4	–	0
Mississippi Normal		–		3	–	3	–	0
Texas Mines		–		3	–	4	–	0
Richmond		–		3	–	5	–	0
Georgetown		–		3	–	6	–	0
East Tennessee State Normal		–		3	–	6	–	0
Davidson		–		3	–	7	–	0
George Washington		–		2	–	8	–	0
Birmingham–Southern		–		1	–	5	–	2
Marshall		–		1	–	7	–	0
Spring Hill		–		1	–	7	–	0

The 1923 Louisville Cardinals football team was an American football team that represented the University of Louisville as an independent during the 1923 college football season. In their first season under head coach Fred Enke, the Cardinals compiled a 5–3 record.

== Schedule ==
Date	Time	Opponent	Site	Result	Source
September 29		at Western Kentucky State Normal	Bowling Green, KY	L 7–19	
October 6		at Union (TN)	Jackson Athletic Park; Jackson, TN	L 6–14	
October 13	2:30 p.m.	Morris Harvey^{†}	Parkway Field; Louisville, KY	W 27–0	
October 20		at Franklin (IN)	Goodel Field; Franklin, IN	L 0–34	
October 27		Rose Poly	Parkway Field; Louisville, KY	W 13–0	
November 3	2:30 p.m.	Transylvania	Parkway Field; Louisville, KY	W 12–0	
November 10		Kentucky Wesleyan	Parkway Field; Louisville, KY	W 7–0	
November 17		at Georgetown (KY)	Georgetown, KY	W 12–6	
^{†}Homecoming; All times are in Central time
