= 1923 Marshall Thundering Herd football team =

American college football season

1923 Marshall Thundering Herd football
- Conference: Independent
- Record: 1–7
- Head coach: Harrison Briggs (1st season)
- Captain: Earl Farrington
- Home stadium: Central Field

1923 Southern college football independents records
	Conf.			Overall
Team	W	L	T	W		L		T
Davis & Elkins		–		8	–	0	–	0
King		–		8	–	0	–	1
VMI		–		9	–	1	–	0
Tennessee Docs		–		6	–	0	–	2
Abilene Christian		–		6	–	1	–	0
West Virginia		–		7	–	1	–	1
Middle Tennessee State Normal		–		4	–	1	–	0
Loyola (LA)		–		5	–	1	–	1
Quantico Marines		–		7	–	2	–	1
Navy		–		5	–	1	–	3
Stetson		–		5	–	2	–	0
Wake Forest		–		6	–	3	–	0
West Tennessee State Normal		–		6	–	3	–	0
William & Mary		–		6	–	3	–	0
Louisville		–		5	–	3	–	0
Delaware		–		5	–	3	–	1
Tennessee State		–		3	–	2	–	0
Trinity (NC)		–		5	–	4	–	0
Western Kentucky State Normal		–		5	–	4	–	0
Union (TN)		–		4	–	4	–	1
Catholic University		–		4	–	4	–	0
Mississippi Normal		–		3	–	3	–	0
Texas Mines		–		3	–	4	–	0
Richmond		–		3	–	5	–	0
Georgetown		–		3	–	6	–	0
East Tennessee State Normal		–		3	–	6	–	0
Davidson		–		3	–	7	–	0
George Washington		–		2	–	8	–	0
Birmingham–Southern		–		1	–	5	–	2
Marshall		–		1	–	7	–	0
Spring Hill		–		1	–	7	–	0

The 1923 Marshall Thundering Herd football team represented Marshall College (now Marshall University) as an independent during the 1923 college football season. Marshall posted a 1–7 record, being outscored by its opposition 28–271. Home games were played on a campus field called "Central Field" which is presently Campus Commons.

== Schedule ==
Date	Opponent	Site	Result	Source
September 29	at Kentucky	Stoll Field; Lexington, KY	L 0–41	
October 6	Rio Grande	Central Field; Huntington, WV	L 6–20	
October 13	Marietta	Central Field; Huntington, WV	L 0–33	
October 20	at West Virginia	Morgantown, WV (rivalry)	L 0–81	
October 27	at Concord	Athens, WV	L 6–9	
November 3	Muskingum	Central Field; Huntington, WV	L 9–34	
November 10	at Wilmington (OH)	Wilmington, OH	L 0–53	
November 22	Morris Harvey^{†}	Central Field; Huntington, WV	W 7–0	
^{†}Homecoming
