= 1923 Trinity Blue Devils football team =

American college football season

1923 Trinity Blue Devils football
- Conference: Independent
- Record: 5–4
- Head coach: E. L. Alexander (1st season)
- Captain: Jimmy Simpson

1923 Southern college football independents records
	Conf.			Overall
Team	W	L	T	W		L		T
Davis & Elkins		–		8	–	0	–	0
King		–		8	–	0	–	1
VMI		–		9	–	1	–	0
Tennessee Docs		–		6	–	0	–	2
Abilene Christian		–		6	–	1	–	0
West Virginia		–		7	–	1	–	1
Middle Tennessee State Normal		–		4	–	1	–	0
Loyola (LA)		–		5	–	1	–	1
Quantico Marines		–		7	–	2	–	1
Navy		–		5	–	1	–	3
Stetson		–		5	–	2	–	0
Wake Forest		–		6	–	3	–	0
West Tennessee State Normal		–		6	–	3	–	0
William & Mary		–		6	–	3	–	0
Louisville		–		5	–	3	–	0
Delaware		–		5	–	3	–	1
Tennessee State		–		3	–	2	–	0
Trinity (NC)		–		5	–	4	–	0
Western Kentucky State Normal		–		5	–	4	–	0
Union (TN)		–		4	–	4	–	1
Catholic University		–		4	–	4	–	0
Mississippi Normal		–		3	–	3	–	0
Texas Mines		–		3	–	4	–	0
Richmond		–		3	–	5	–	0
Georgetown		–		3	–	6	–	0
East Tennessee State Normal		–		3	–	6	–	0
Davidson		–		3	–	7	–	0
George Washington		–		2	–	8	–	0
Birmingham–Southern		–		1	–	5	–	2
Marshall		–		1	–	7	–	0
Spring Hill		–		1	–	7	–	0

The 1923 Trinity Blue Devils team was an American football team that represented Trinity College (later renamed Duke University) as an independent during the 1923 college football season. In its first and only season under head coach E. L. Alexander, the team compiled a 5–4 record and outscored opponents by a total of 211 to 104. The team shut out Guilford (68–0), Randolph–Macon (54–0), and Elon (39–0). Jimmy Simpson was the team captain.

== Schedule ==
Date	Opponent	Site	Result	Attendance	Source
September 29	Guilford	Hanes Field; Durham, NC	W 68–0		
October 6	Randolph–Macon	Hanes Field; Durham, NC	W 54–0		
October 12	North Carolina	Hanes Field; Durham, NC (rivalry)	L 6–14		
October 20	vs. William & Mary	Rocky Mount, NC	L 0–21		
October 27	at Virginia	Lambeth Field; Charlottesville, VA	L 0–33		
November 3	vs. Elon	Cone Athletic Park (II); Greensboro, NC	W 39–0		
November 10	vs. Wake Forest	South Side Park; Winston-Salem, NC	L 6–16	1,500	
November 24	Newberry	Hanes Field; Durham, NC	W 20–14		
November 29	vs. Davidson	Wearn Field; Charlotte, NC	W 18–6	2,500	
