= 1923 Davis & Elkins Senators football team =

American college football season

1923 Davis & Elkins Senators football
- Conference: Independent
- Record: 8–0
- Head coach: Cam Henderson (1st season)
- Home stadium: Davis Stadium

1923 Southern college football independents records
	Conf.			Overall
Team	W	L	T	W		L		T
Davis & Elkins		–		8	–	0	–	0
King		–		8	–	0	–	1
VMI		–		9	–	1	–	0
Tennessee Docs		–		6	–	0	–	2
Abilene Christian		–		6	–	1	–	0
West Virginia		–		7	–	1	–	1
Middle Tennessee State Normal		–		4	–	1	–	0
Loyola (LA)		–		5	–	1	–	1
Quantico Marines		–		7	–	2	–	1
Navy		–		5	–	1	–	3
Stetson		–		5	–	2	–	0
Wake Forest		–		6	–	3	–	0
West Tennessee State Normal		–		6	–	3	–	0
William & Mary		–		6	–	3	–	0
Louisville		–		5	–	3	–	0
Delaware		–		5	–	3	–	1
Trinity (NC)		–		5	–	4	–	0
Western Kentucky State Normal		–		5	–	4	–	0
Union (TN)		–		4	–	4	–	1
Catholic University		–		4	–	4	–	0
Mississippi Normal		–		3	–	3	–	0
Texas Mines		–		3	–	4	–	0
Richmond		–		3	–	5	–	0
Georgetown		–		3	–	6	–	0
East Tennessee State Normal		–		3	–	6	–	0
Davidson		–		3	–	7	–	0
George Washington		–		2	–	8	–	0
Birmingham–Southern		–		1	–	5	–	2
Marshall		–		1	–	7	–	0
Spring Hill		–		1	–	7	–	0

The 1923 Davis & Elkins Senators football team was an American football team that represented Davis & Elkins College of Elkins, West Virginia during the 1923 college football season. In its first year under head coach Cam Henderson, the team compiled a perfect 8–0 record.

Davis & Elkins was one of several unbeaten and untied football teams in 1923, others including Illinois, Michigan, Marquette, Colorado, Cornell, SMU, Yale, and New Mexico A&M. Because of Davis & Elkins' weaker schedule, it has been rejected as a candidate for 1923 national champion.

Davis & Elkins played its home games at Davis Stadium in Elkins, West Virginia.

== Schedule ==
Date	Opponent	Site	Result	Source
September 28	Fairmont State	Davis Stadium; Elkins, WV	W 52–0	
October 6	vs. Bethany (WV)	Wheeling, WV	W 7–6	
October 13	Rio Grande	Davis Stadium; Elkins, WV	W 56–0	
October 20	vs. Western Maryland	Mid-City Stadium; Cumberland, MD	W 14–6	
October 27	New River State	Davis Stadium; Elkins, WV	W 51–0	
November 3	Morris Harvey	Davis Stadium; Elkins, WV	W 54–0	
November 9	Broaddus	Davis Stadium; Elkins, WV	W 13–7	
November 16	Salem (WV)	Davis Stadium; Elkins, WV	W 47–3	
