= 1923 Texas Mines Miners football team =

American college football season

1923 Texas Mines Miners football
- Conference: Independent
- Record: 3–4
- Head coach: Jack C. Vowell (2nd season)
- Home stadium: El Paso High School stadium

1923 Southern college football independents records
	Conf.			Overall
Team	W	L	T	W		L		T
Davis & Elkins		–		8	–	0	–	0
King		–		8	–	0	–	1
VMI		–		9	–	1	–	0
Tennessee Docs		–		6	–	0	–	2
West Virginia		–		7	–	1	–	1
Middle Tennessee State Normal		–		4	–	1	–	0
Loyola (LA)		–		5	–	1	–	1
Quantico Marines		–		7	–	2	–	1
Navy		–		5	–	1	–	3
Stetson		–		5	–	2	–	0
Wake Forest		–		6	–	3	–	0
West Tennessee State Normal		–		6	–	3	–	0
William & Mary		–		6	–	3	–	0
Louisville		–		5	–	3	–	0
Delaware		–		5	–	3	–	1
Trinity (NC)		–		5	–	4	–	0
Western Kentucky State Normal		–		5	–	4	–	0
Union (TN)		–		4	–	4	–	1
Catholic University		–		4	–	4	–	0
Mississippi Normal		–		3	–	3	–	0
Texas Mines		–		3	–	4	–	0
Richmond		–		3	–	5	–	0
Georgetown		–		3	–	6	–	0
East Tennessee State Normal		–		3	–	6	–	0
Davidson		–		3	–	7	–	0
George Washington		–		2	–	8	–	0
Birmingham–Southern		–		1	–	5	–	2
Marshall		–		1	–	7	–	0
Spring Hill		–		1	–	7	–	0

The 1923 Texas Mines Miners football team was an American football team that represented the Texas School of Mines (now known as the University of Texas at El Paso) as an independent during the 1923 college football season. In its second season under head coach Jack C. Vowell, the team compiled a 3–4 record and outscored opponents by a total of 115 to 65.

== Schedule ==
Date	Opponent	Site	Result	Source
October 13	Eighth Cavalry	El Paso, TX	W 20–0	
October 20	at Arizona	Tucson, AZ	L 7–12	
October 27	New Mexico	El Paso High School stadium; El Paso, TX	L 0–3	
November 3	at New Mexico Military	Roswell, NM	L 7–19	
November 10	New Mexico A&M	El Paso High School stadium; El Paso, TX (rivalry)	L 2–23	
November 22	at Sul Ross	Alpine, TX	W 54–2	
December 8	First Cavalry Division	El Paso High School stadium; El Paso, TX	W 25–6	
