= 1923 West Virginia Mountaineers football team =

American college football season

1923 West Virginia Mountaineers football
- Conference: Independent
- Record: 7–1–1
- Head coach: Clarence Spears (3rd season)
- Captain: Fred "Jack" Simons

1923 Southern college football independents records
	Conf.			Overall
Team	W	L	T	W		L		T
Davis & Elkins		–		8	–	0	–	0
King		–		8	–	0	–	1
VMI		–		9	–	1	–	0
Tennessee Docs		–		6	–	0	–	2
Abilene Christian		–		6	–	1	–	0
West Virginia		–		7	–	1	–	1
Middle Tennessee State Normal		–		4	–	1	–	0
Loyola (LA)		–		5	–	1	–	1
Quantico Marines		–		7	–	2	–	1
Navy		–		5	–	1	–	3
Stetson		–		5	–	2	–	0
Wake Forest		–		6	–	3	–	0
West Tennessee State Normal		–		6	–	3	–	0
William & Mary		–		6	–	3	–	0
Louisville		–		5	–	3	–	0
Delaware		–		5	–	3	–	1
Trinity (NC)		–		5	–	4	–	0
Western Kentucky State Normal		–		5	–	4	–	0
Union (TN)		–		4	–	4	–	1
Catholic University		–		4	–	4	–	0
Mississippi Normal		–		3	–	3	–	0
Texas Mines		–		3	–	4	–	0
Richmond		–		3	–	5	–	0
Georgetown		–		3	–	6	–	0
East Tennessee State Normal		–		3	–	6	–	0
Davidson		–		3	–	7	–	0
George Washington		–		2	–	8	–	0
Birmingham–Southern		–		1	–	5	–	2
Marshall		–		1	–	7	–	0
Spring Hill		–		1	–	7	–	0

The 1923 West Virginia Mountaineers football team was an American football team that represented West Virginia University as an independent during the 1923 college football season. In its third season under head coach Clarence Spears, the team compiled a 7–1–1 record and outscored opponents by a combined total of 297 to 41.

== Schedule ==
Date	Opponent	Site	Result	Attendance	Source
September 29	vs. West Virginia Wesleyan	Fairmont, WV	W 21–7		
October 6	Allegheny	Athletic Field; Morgantown, WV	W 28–0		
October 13	at Pittsburgh	Forbes Field; Pittsburgh, PA (rivalry)	W 13–7	30,000	
October 20	Marshall	Athletic Field; Morgantown, WV (rivalry)	W 81–0		
October 27	vs. Penn State	Yankee Stadium; Bronx, NY (rivalry)	T 13–13	50,000	
November 6	vs. Rutgers	Polo Grounds; New York, NY	W 27–7		
November 10	vs. Washington and Lee	Laidley Field; Charleston, WV	W 63–0		
November 17	Saint Louis	Athletic Field; Morgantown, WV	W 48–0	5,000	
November 29	Washington & Jefferson	Athletic Field; Morgantown, WV	L 2–7		
