= 1923 Delaware Fightin' Blue Hens football team =

American college football season

1923 Delaware Fightin' Blue Hens football
- Conference: Independent
- Record: 5–3–1
- Head coach: William McAvoy (2nd season)

1923 Southern college football independents records
	Conf.			Overall
Team	W	L	T	W		L		T
Davis & Elkins		–		8	–	0	–	0
King		–		8	–	0	–	1
VMI		–		9	–	1	–	0
Tennessee Docs		–		6	–	0	–	2
West Virginia		–		7	–	1	–	1
Middle Tennessee State Normal		–		4	–	1	–	0
Loyola (LA)		–		5	–	1	–	1
Quantico Marines		–		7	–	2	–	1
Navy		–		5	–	1	–	3
Stetson		–		5	–	2	–	0
Wake Forest		–		6	–	3	–	0
West Tennessee State Normal		–		6	–	3	–	0
William & Mary		–		6	–	3	–	0
Louisville		–		5	–	3	–	0
Delaware		–		5	–	3	–	1
Trinity (NC)		–		5	–	4	–	0
Western Kentucky State Normal		–		5	–	4	–	0
Union (TN)		–		4	–	4	–	1
Catholic University		–		4	–	4	–	0
Mississippi Normal		–		3	–	3	–	0
Texas Mines		–		3	–	4	–	0
Richmond		–		3	–	5	–	0
Georgetown		–		3	–	6	–	0
East Tennessee State Normal		–		3	–	6	–	0
Davidson		–		3	–	7	–	0
George Washington		–		2	–	8	–	0
Birmingham–Southern		–		1	–	5	–	2
Marshall		–		1	–	7	–	0
Spring Hill		–		1	–	7	–	0

The 1923 Delaware Fightin' Blue Hens football team was an American football team that represented the University of Delaware in the 1923 college football season. In its second season under head coach William McAvoy, the team compiled a 5–3–1 record and outscored opponents by a total of 76 to 45.

== Schedule ==
Date	Opponent	Site	Result	Source
September 29	Saint Joseph's	Newark, DE	L 0–4	
October 6	Muhlenberg	Newark, DE	W 6–0	
October 13	Ursinus	Newark, DE	W 14–7	
October 20	at CCNY	Lewisohn Stadium; New York, NY	W 18–0	
October 27	St. John's (MD)	Newark, DE	T 0–0	
November 3	at Haverford	Haverford, PA	W 19–6	
November 10	at William & Mary	Williamsburg, VA (rivalry)	L 0–14	
November 17	George Washington	Frazer Field; Newark, DE	W 19–7	
November 27	Dickinson	Wilmington, DE	L 0–7	
