= 1923 Spring Hill Badgers football team =

American college football season

1923 Spring Hill Badgers football
- Conference: Independent
- Record: 1–7
- Head coach: Edward J. "Mickey" Connors (1st season)
- Captain: Pat Browne
- Home stadium: Monroe Park

1923 Southern college football independents records
	Conf.			Overall
Team	W	L	T	W		L		T
Davis & Elkins		–		8	–	0	–	0
King		–		8	–	0	–	1
VMI		–		9	–	1	–	0
Tennessee Docs		–		6	–	0	–	2
Abilene Christian		–		6	–	1	–	0
West Virginia		–		7	–	1	–	1
Middle Tennessee State Normal		–		4	–	1	–	0
Loyola (LA)		–		5	–	1	–	1
Quantico Marines		–		7	–	2	–	1
Navy		–		5	–	1	–	3
Stetson		–		5	–	2	–	0
Wake Forest		–		6	–	3	–	0
West Tennessee State Normal		–		6	–	3	–	0
William & Mary		–		6	–	3	–	0
Louisville		–		5	–	3	–	0
Delaware		–		5	–	3	–	1
Trinity (NC)		–		5	–	4	–	0
Western Kentucky State Normal		–		5	–	4	–	0
Union (TN)		–		4	–	4	–	1
Catholic University		–		4	–	4	–	0
Mississippi Normal		–		3	–	3	–	0
Texas Mines		–		3	–	4	–	0
Richmond		–		3	–	5	–	0
Georgetown		–		3	–	6	–	0
East Tennessee State Normal		–		3	–	6	–	0
Davidson		–		3	–	7	–	0
George Washington		–		2	–	8	–	0
Birmingham–Southern		–		1	–	5	–	2
Marshall		–		1	–	7	–	0
Spring Hill		–		1	–	7	–	0

The 1923 Spring Hill Badgers football team was an American football team that represented Spring Hill College as an independent during the 1923 college football season. Led by Edward J. "Mickey" Connors in his first season as head coach, the Badgers compiled an overall record of 1–7.

== Schedule ==
Date	Opponent	Site	Result	Attendance	Source
October 6	at Camp Benning	Columbus, GA	W 13–12		
October 13	at LSU	State Field; Baton Rouge, LA	L 0–33	3,500	
October 21	at Loyola (LA)	Loyola Stadium; New Orleans, LA	L 6–19		
October 27	Alabama	Monroe Park; Mobile, AL	L 0–59	2,600	
November 3	Southwestern Louisiana	Maxon Field; Mobile, AL	L 7–40		
November 9	vs. Marion	Cramton Bowl; Montgomery, AL	L 13–14		
November 17	Millsaps	Monroe Park; Mobile, AL	L 6–7		
November 29	Union (TN)	Monroe Park; Mobile, AL	L 0–13		
