= 1923 VMI Keydets football team =

American college football season

1923 VMI Keydets football
- Conference: Independent
- Record: 9–1
- Head coach: Blandy Clarkson (4th season)

1923 Southern college football independents records
	Conf.			Overall
Team	W	L	T	W		L		T
Davis & Elkins		–		8	–	0	–	0
King		–		8	–	0	–	1
VMI		–		9	–	1	–	0
Tennessee Docs		–		6	–	0	–	2
Abilene Christian		–		6	–	1	–	0
West Virginia		–		7	–	1	–	1
Middle Tennessee State Normal		–		4	–	1	–	0
Loyola (LA)		–		5	–	1	–	1
Quantico Marines		–		7	–	2	–	1
Navy		–		5	–	1	–	3
Stetson		–		5	–	2	–	0
Wake Forest		–		6	–	3	–	0
West Tennessee State Normal		–		6	–	3	–	0
William & Mary		–		6	–	3	–	0
Louisville		–		5	–	3	–	0
Delaware		–		5	–	3	–	1
Trinity (NC)		–		5	–	4	–	0
Western Kentucky State Normal		–		5	–	4	–	0
Union (TN)		–		4	–	4	–	1
Catholic University		–		4	–	4	–	0
Mississippi Normal		–		3	–	3	–	0
Texas Mines		–		3	–	4	–	0
Richmond		–		3	–	5	–	0
Georgetown		–		3	–	6	–	0
East Tennessee State Normal		–		3	–	6	–	0
Davidson		–		3	–	7	–	0
George Washington		–		2	–	8	–	0
Birmingham–Southern		–		1	–	5	–	2
Marshall		–		1	–	7	–	0
Spring Hill		–		1	–	7	–	0

The 1923 VMI Keydets football team represented the Virginia Military Institute in their 33rd season of organized football, during the 1923 college football season. Led by fourth-year head coach Blandy Clarkson, the Keydets went 9–1 and outscored opponents 224 to 23. Tackle Charlie Barbour was All-Southern.

== Schedule ==
Date	Opponent	Site	Result	Attendance	Source
September 22	Quantico Marines	VMI Parade Ground; Lexington, VA	W 6–0		
September 29	Lynchburg	VMI Parade Ground; Lexington, VA	W 33–0		
October 6	at Georgia Tech	Grant Field; Atlanta, GA	L 7–10		
October 13	Roanoke	VMI Parade Ground; Lexington, VA	W 27–6		
October 20	at Virginia	Lambeth Field; Charlottesville, VA	W 35–0	9,000	
October 27	NC State	VMI Parade Ground; Lexington, VA	W 22–7		
November 3	Emory and Henry	VMI Parade Ground; Lexington, VA	W 46–0		
November 10	vs. North Carolina	Mayo Island Park; Richmond, VA	W 9–0	10,000	
November 17	at Tennessee	Shields–Watkins Field; Knoxville, TN	W 33–0		
November 29	vs. VPI	Roanoke, VA (rivalry)	W 6–0	14,000–15,000	
