= 1923 Birmingham–Southern Panthers football team =

American college football season

1923 Birmingham–Southern Panthers football
- Conference: Independent
- Record: 1–5–2
- Head coach: Charles H. Brown (5th season)
- Home stadium: Rickwood Field

1923 Southern college football independents records
	Conf.			Overall
Team	W	L	T	W		L		T
Davis & Elkins		–		8	–	0	–	0
King		–		8	–	0	–	1
VMI		–		9	–	1	–	0
Tennessee Docs		–		6	–	0	–	2
Abilene Christian		–		6	–	1	–	0
West Virginia		–		7	–	1	–	1
Middle Tennessee State Normal		–		4	–	1	–	0
Loyola (LA)		–		5	–	1	–	1
Quantico Marines		–		7	–	2	–	1
Navy		–		5	–	1	–	3
Stetson		–		5	–	2	–	0
Wake Forest		–		6	–	3	–	0
West Tennessee State Normal		–		6	–	3	–	0
William & Mary		–		6	–	3	–	0
Louisville		–		5	–	3	–	0
Delaware		–		5	–	3	–	1
Trinity (NC)		–		5	–	4	–	0
Western Kentucky State Normal		–		5	–	4	–	0
Union (TN)		–		4	–	4	–	1
Catholic University		–		4	–	4	–	0
Mississippi Normal		–		3	–	3	–	0
Texas Mines		–		3	–	4	–	0
Richmond		–		3	–	5	–	0
Georgetown		–		3	–	6	–	0
East Tennessee State Normal		–		3	–	6	–	0
Davidson		–		3	–	7	–	0
George Washington		–		2	–	8	–	0
Birmingham–Southern		–		1	–	5	–	2
Marshall		–		1	–	7	–	0
Spring Hill		–		1	–	7	–	0

The 1923 Birmingham–Southern Panthers football team was an American football team that represented Birmingham–Southern College as an independent during the 1923 college football season. In their fifth season under head coach Charles H. Brown, the team compiled a 1–5–2 record.

== Schedule ==
Date	Opponent	Site	Result	Source
September 29	Jacksonville State	Rickwood Field; Birmingham, AL	T 0–0	
October 6	at Auburn	Cramton Bowl; Montgomery, AL	L 0–20	
October 13	Mississippi College	Rickwood Field; Birmingham, AL	L 0–19	
October 18	at Millsaps	State Fairgrounds; Jackson, MS	W 7–6	
October 26	at Mercer	Centennial Field; Macon, GA	L 0–12	
November 3	at Ole Miss	Hemingway Stadium; Oxford, MS	L 0–6	
November 9	vs. Chattanooga	Dwight Park; Gadsden, AL	L 0–19	
November 24	vs. Howard (AL)	Rickwood Field; Birmingham, AL	T 6–6	
