= 1923 East Tennessee State Normal football team =

American college football season

1923 East Tennessee State Normal football
- Conference: Independent
- Record: 2–5 (3–6 with non-countable games)
- Head coach: James Karl Luck (2nd season)

1923 Southern college football independents records
	Conf.			Overall
Team	W	L	T	W		L		T
Davis & Elkins		–		8	–	0	–	0
King		–		8	–	0	–	1
VMI		–		9	–	1	–	0
Tennessee Docs		–		6	–	0	–	2
Abilene Christian		–		6	–	1	–	0
West Virginia		–		7	–	1	–	1
Middle Tennessee State Normal		–		4	–	1	–	0
Loyola (LA)		–		5	–	1	–	1
Quantico Marines		–		7	–	2	–	1
Navy		–		5	–	1	–	3
Stetson		–		5	–	2	–	0
Wake Forest		–		6	–	3	–	0
West Tennessee State Normal		–		6	–	3	–	0
William & Mary		–		6	–	3	–	0
Louisville		–		5	–	3	–	0
Delaware		–		5	–	3	–	1
Trinity (NC)		–		5	–	4	–	0
Western Kentucky State Normal		–		5	–	4	–	0
Union (TN)		–		4	–	4	–	1
Catholic University		–		4	–	4	–	0
Mississippi Normal		–		3	–	3	–	0
Texas Mines		–		3	–	4	–	0
Richmond		–		3	–	5	–	0
Georgetown		–		3	–	6	–	0
East Tennessee State Normal		–		3	–	6	–	0
Davidson		–		3	–	7	–	0
George Washington		–		2	–	8	–	0
Birmingham–Southern		–		1	–	5	–	2
Marshall		–		1	–	7	–	0
Spring Hill		–		1	–	7	–	0

The 1923 East Tennessee State Normal School football team was an American football team that represented East Tennessee State Normal School—now known as East Tennessee State University (ETSU)—as an independent in the 1923 college football season. They were led by second-year head coach James Karl Luck. The 1923 season was considered one of the worst seasons in school history as the team suffered five losses by a margin of 38 points or greater, including a 108–0 blowout at the hands of King. The season marked the first time the team played Tennessee, albeit the freshmen team, losing 49–7.

== Schedule ==
Date	Opponent	Site	Result	Source
October 13	at Concord	Princeton, WV	L 0–32	
October 20	at Emory and Henry	Emory, VA	L 0–45	
October 30	at King	Tenneva Field; Bristol, TN	L 0–108	
November 3	Lincoln Memorial	Johnson City, TN	W 26–19	
November 10	Athens	Johnson City, TN	L 13–20	
November 17	Tennessee freshmen	Johnson City, TN	L 7–49	
November 23	Maryville (TN)	Maryville, TN	L 0–72	
November 29	Tusculum	Johnson City, TN	W 13–0	
December 1	Johnson City All-Stars	Johnson City, TN	W 46–0	
