= 1923 Quantico Marines Devil Dogs football team =

College football season

1923 Quantico Marines Devil Dogs football
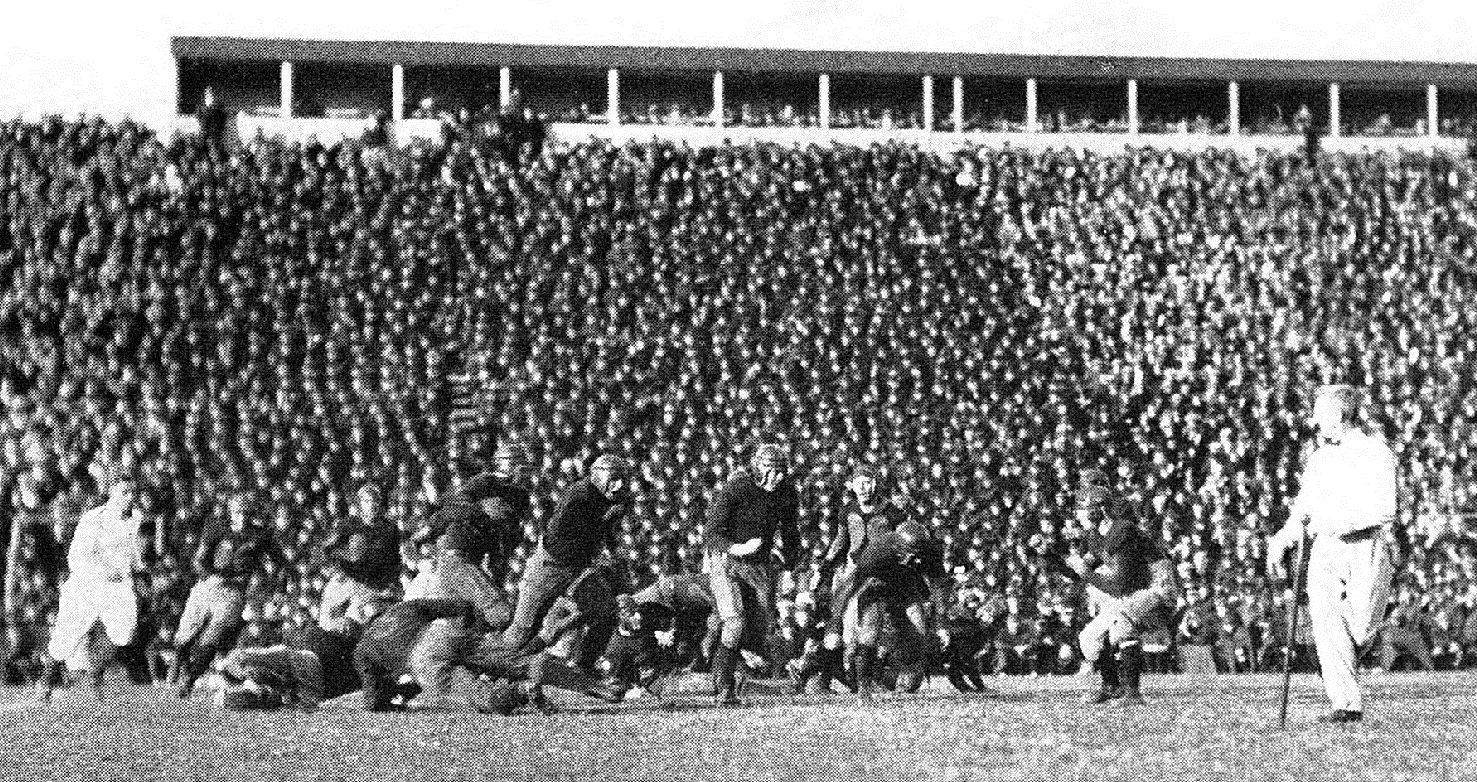
- Quantico Marines vs. Michigan on November 10
- Conference: Independent
- Record: 7–2–1
- Head coach: John Beckett (3rd season)

1923 Southern college football independents records
	Conf.			Overall
Team	W	L	T	W		L		T
Davis & Elkins		–		8	–	0	–	0
King		–		8	–	0	–	1
VMI		–		9	–	1	–	0
Tennessee Docs		–		6	–	0	–	2
Abilene Christian		–		6	–	1	–	0
West Virginia		–		7	–	1	–	1
Middle Tennessee State Normal		–		4	–	1	–	0
Loyola (LA)		–		5	–	1	–	1
Quantico Marines		–		7	–	2	–	1
Navy		–		5	–	1	–	3
Stetson		–		5	–	2	–	0
Wake Forest		–		6	–	3	–	0
West Tennessee State Normal		–		6	–	3	–	0
William & Mary		–		6	–	3	–	0
Louisville		–		5	–	3	–	0
Delaware		–		5	–	3	–	1
Trinity (NC)		–		5	–	4	–	0
Western Kentucky State Normal		–		5	–	4	–	0
Union (TN)		–		4	–	4	–	1
Catholic University		–		4	–	4	–	0
Mississippi Normal		–		3	–	3	–	0
Texas Mines		–		3	–	4	–	0
Richmond		–		3	–	5	–	0
Georgetown		–		3	–	6	–	0
East Tennessee State Normal		–		3	–	6	–	0
Davidson		–		3	–	7	–	0
George Washington		–		2	–	8	–	0
Birmingham–Southern		–		1	–	5	–	2
Marshall		–		1	–	7	–	0
Spring Hill		–		1	–	7	–	0

The 1923 Quantico Marines Devil Dogs football team represented the Quantico Marine Base in the 1923 college football season. The team was led by third-year head coach John Beckett. In a 10-game schedule, the team went 7–2–1, with losses to VMI and Michigan. Between those two losses, the team had a six-game winning streak where they outscored opponents by an aggregate of 248–3. The season ended with a tie against Haskell and a 7–0 win over military rival Third Army Corps.

== Schedule ==
Date	Opponent	Site	Result	Attendance	Source
September 22	at VMI	VMI Parade Ground; Lexington, VA	L 0–6		
September 29	vs. Washington College	Winchester, VA	W 19–0	20,000	
October 6	at Georgetown	Griffith Stadium; Washington, D.C.	W 14–3	15,000	
October 13	Western Maryland freshmen (Note: Catholic University, listed by some sources as the Devil Dogs' opponent, played and defeated Randolph–Macon on this date.)	Quantico, VA	W 74–0		
October 20	Gallaudet	Quantico, VA	W 61–0		
October 27	vs. George Washington	Norfolk, VA	W 40–0	2,500	
November 3	Villanova	Quantico, VA	W 40–0		
November 10	at Michigan	Ferry Field; Ann Arbor, MI	L 6–26	42,000	
November 17	vs. Haskell	Yankee Stadium; Bronx, NY	T 14–14	10,000	
December 1	vs. Third Army Corps	Griffith Stadium; Washington, D.C.	W 7–0		

== Game summaries ==
=== At Michigan ===
Quantico Marines at Michigan

Team	1	2	3	4	Total
Quantico Marines	6	0	0	0	6
• Michigan	0	7	7	12	26

- Date: November 10, 1923
- Location: Ferry Field
  Ann Arbor, MI
- Game attendance: 42,000
- Referee: James Masker (Northwestern)

On November 10, 1923, the Quantico Marines faced the 1923 Michigan Wolverines football team at Ferry Field in Ann Arbor, Michigan. The game was attended by 2,000 Marines and by several dignitaries, including Secretary of the Navy Edwin Denby, who had played football at Michigan in the 1890s, and Marine Corps Commandant John A. Lejeune. The Wolverines, who went on to an undefeated season and a national championship, defeated the Marines, 26–6. The Marines took the opening kickoff and drove 89 yards for a touchdown, using "a bewildering aerial and line attack." The Marines' touchdown was the only one scored on Michigan during the entire 1923 season. The Marines led 6–0 at the end of the first quarter, but Michigan then scored 26 unanswered points. Quarterback Irwin Uteritz led Michigan's comeback, scoring a touchdown in the second quarter on a dive between center Jack Blott's legs. Uteritz later left the game with a broken leg and was replaced by Tod Rockwell at quarterback. When Rockwell came into the game, Michigan lined up for a field goal with Rockwell holding the ball. As the Marines came through to block the kick, Rockwell jumped to his feet and ran the ball 26 yards for a touchdown.
