= 1923 Mississippi Normal Normalites football team =

American college football season

1923 Mississippi Normal Normalites football
- Conference: Independent
- Record: 3–3
- Head coach: O. V. Austin (3rd season)
- Home stadium: Kamper Park

1923 Southern college football independents records
	Conf.			Overall
Team	W	L	T	W		L		T
Davis & Elkins		–		8	–	0	–	0
King		–		8	–	0	–	1
VMI		–		9	–	1	–	0
Tennessee Docs		–		6	–	0	–	2
Abilene Christian		–		6	–	1	–	0
West Virginia		–		7	–	1	–	1
Middle Tennessee State Normal		–		4	–	1	–	0
Loyola (LA)		–		5	–	1	–	1
Quantico Marines		–		7	–	2	–	1
Navy		–		5	–	1	–	3
Stetson		–		5	–	2	–	0
Wake Forest		–		6	–	3	–	0
West Tennessee State Normal		–		6	–	3	–	0
William & Mary		–		6	–	3	–	0
Louisville		–		5	–	3	–	0
Delaware		–		5	–	3	–	1
Trinity (NC)		–		5	–	4	–	0
Western Kentucky State Normal		–		5	–	4	–	0
Union (TN)		–		4	–	4	–	1
Catholic University		–		4	–	4	–	0
Mississippi Normal		–		3	–	3	–	0
Texas Mines		–		3	–	4	–	0
Richmond		–		3	–	5	–	0
Georgetown		–		3	–	6	–	0
East Tennessee State Normal		–		3	–	6	–	0
Davidson		–		3	–	7	–	0
George Washington		–		2	–	8	–	0
Birmingham–Southern		–		1	–	5	–	2
Marshall		–		1	–	7	–	0
Spring Hill		–		1	–	7	–	0

The 1923 Mississippi Normal Normalites football team was an American football team that represented Mississippi Normal College (now known as the University of Southern Mississippi) as an independent during the 1923 college football season. In their third year under head coach O. V. Austin, the team compiled a 3–3 record.

== Schedule ==
Date	Opponent	Site	Result	Source
October 5	Purvis High School	Kamper Park; Hattiesburg, MS	W 26–0	
October 12	at Millsaps	Athletic Park; Jackson, MS	L 0–31	
November 3	Seashore Campground School	Kamper Park; Hattiesburg, MS	W 52–0	
November 10	Gulf Coast Military Academy	Kamper Park; Hattiesburg, MS	L 6–7	
November 17	at Southwestern Louisiana	Girard Field; Lafayette, LA	L 0–66	
November 23	Mississippi College freshmen	Kamper Park; Hattiesburg, MS	W 6–0	
