= 1923 Wake Forest Baptists football team =

American college football season

1923 Wake Forest Baptists football
- Conference: Independent
- Record: 6–3
- Head coach: Hank Garrity (1st season)
- Captain: Pete Pegano
- Home stadium: Gore Field

1923 Southern college football independents records
	Conf.			Overall
Team	W	L	T	W		L		T
Davis & Elkins		–		8	–	0	–	0
King		–		8	–	0	–	1
VMI		–		9	–	1	–	0
Tennessee Docs		–		6	–	0	–	2
Abilene Christian		–		6	–	1	–	0
West Virginia		–		7	–	1	–	1
Middle Tennessee State Normal		–		4	–	1	–	0
Loyola (LA)		–		5	–	1	–	1
Quantico Marines		–		7	–	2	–	1
Navy		–		5	–	1	–	3
Stetson		–		5	–	2	–	0
Wake Forest		–		6	–	3	–	0
West Tennessee State Normal		–		6	–	3	–	0
William & Mary		–		6	–	3	–	0
Louisville		–		5	–	3	–	0
Delaware		–		5	–	3	–	1
Trinity (NC)		–		5	–	4	–	0
Western Kentucky State Normal		–		5	–	4	–	0
Union (TN)		–		4	–	4	–	1
Catholic University		–		4	–	4	–	0
Mississippi Normal		–		3	–	3	–	0
Texas Mines		–		3	–	4	–	0
Richmond		–		3	–	5	–	0
Georgetown		–		3	–	6	–	0
East Tennessee State Normal		–		3	–	6	–	0
Davidson		–		3	–	7	–	0
George Washington		–		2	–	8	–	0
Birmingham–Southern		–		1	–	5	–	2
Marshall		–		1	–	7	–	0
Spring Hill		–		1	–	7	–	0

The 1923 Wake Forest Baptists football team was an American football team that represented Wake Forest University as an independent during the 1923 college football season. In their first season under head coach Hank Garrity, the Baptists compiled a 6–3 record and outscored opponents by a total of 125 to 64.

After a particularly impressive win against Trinity College (predecessor of Duke University), in the following issue of the school newspaper, the editor of the paper, Mayon Parker (1924 Wake Forest graduate), first referred to the team as "Demon Deacons," in recognition of what he called their "devilish" play and fighting spirit. Henry Belk, Wake Forest's news director, and Garrity liked the title and used it often, so the popularity of the term grew.

The team played its home games at Gore Field in Wake Forest, North Carolina.

== Schedule ==
Date	Opponent	Site	Result	Attendance	Source
September 29	at North Carolina	Emerson Field; Chapel Hill, NC (rivalry)	L 0–22	5,000	
October 6	Guilford	Gore Field; Wake Forest, NC	W 41–0		
October 13	Lynchburg	Gore Field; Wake Forest, NC	W 25–0		
October 20	vs. Davidson	Wearn Field; Charlotte, NC	W 6–0	4,000	
October 27	vs. Florida	Plant Field; Tampa, FL	L 7–16	7,000	
November 10	vs. Trinity (NC)	South Side Park; Winston-Salem, NC (rivalry)	W 16–6	1,500	
November 17	Elon	Gore Field; Wake Forest, NC	W 9–6		
November 24	NC State	Gore Field; Wake Forest, NC (rivalry)	W 14–0	4,000	
November 29	at South Carolina	University Field; Columbia, SC	L 7–14		
