= 1923 Loyola Wolf Pack football team =

American college football season

1923 Loyola Wolf Pack football
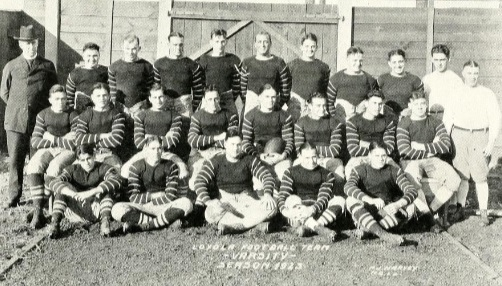
- 1923 Loyola University Football Team
- Conference: Independent
- Record: 5–1–1
- Head coach: William Flynn (3rd season)
- Home stadium: Loyola Stadium

1923 Southern college football independents records
	Conf.			Overall
Team	W	L	T	W		L		T
Davis & Elkins		–		8	–	0	–	0
King		–		8	–	0	–	1
VMI		–		9	–	1	–	0
Tennessee Docs		–		6	–	0	–	2
Abilene Christian		–		6	–	1	–	0
West Virginia		–		7	–	1	–	1
Middle Tennessee State Normal		–		4	–	1	–	0
Loyola (LA)		–		5	–	1	–	1
Quantico Marines		–		7	–	2	–	1
Navy		–		5	–	1	–	3
Stetson		–		5	–	2	–	0
Wake Forest		–		6	–	3	–	0
West Tennessee State Normal		–		6	–	3	–	0
William & Mary		–		6	–	3	–	0
Louisville		–		5	–	3	–	0
Delaware		–		5	–	3	–	1
Trinity (NC)		–		5	–	4	–	0
Western Kentucky State Normal		–		5	–	4	–	0
Union (TN)		–		4	–	4	–	1
Catholic University		–		4	–	4	–	0
Mississippi Normal		–		3	–	3	–	0
Texas Mines		–		3	–	4	–	0
Richmond		–		3	–	5	–	0
Georgetown		–		3	–	6	–	0
East Tennessee State Normal		–		3	–	6	–	0
Davidson		–		3	–	7	–	0
George Washington		–		2	–	8	–	0
Birmingham–Southern		–		1	–	5	–	2
Marshall		–		1	–	7	–	0
Spring Hill		–		1	–	7	–	0

The 1923 Loyola Wolf Pack football team was an American football team that represented Loyola College of New Orleans (now known as Loyola University New Orleans) as an independent during the 1923 college football season. In its third and final season under head coach William Flynn, the team compiled a 5–1–1 record and outscored opponents by a total of 104 to 41.

== Schedule ==
Date	Opponent	Site	Result	Attendance	Source
October 13	Louisiana Normal	Loyola Stadium; New Orleans, LA	W 36–0		
October 21	Spring Hill	Loyola Stadium; New Orleans, LA	W 19–6		
October 27	Marion	Loyola Stadium; New Orleans, LA	W 33–0		
November 3	Dallas	Loyola Stadium; New Orleans, LA	W 10–0		
November 10	Tennessee Docs	Loyola Stadium; New Orleans, LA	T 0–0		
November 17	at Louisiana Tech	Tech Field; Ruston, LA	L 6–28		
November 29	at Louisiana College	City Park; Alexandria, LA	W 13–7		
