= 1923 Richmond Spiders football team =

American college football season

1923 Richmond Spiders football
- Conference: Independent
- Record: 3–5
- Head coach: Frank Dobson (10th season)
- Captain: Ralph C. Bethel
- Home stadium: Stadium Field

1923 Southern college football independents records
	Conf.			Overall
Team	W	L	T	W		L		T
Davis & Elkins		–		8	–	0	–	0
King		–		8	–	0	–	1
VMI		–		9	–	1	–	0
Tennessee Docs		–		6	–	0	–	2
Abilene Christian		–		6	–	1	–	0
West Virginia		–		7	–	1	–	1
Middle Tennessee State Normal		–		4	–	1	–	0
Loyola (LA)		–		5	–	1	–	1
Quantico Marines		–		7	–	2	–	1
Navy		–		5	–	1	–	3
Stetson		–		5	–	2	–	0
Wake Forest		–		6	–	3	–	0
West Tennessee State Normal		–		6	–	3	–	0
William & Mary		–		6	–	3	–	0
Louisville		–		5	–	3	–	0
Delaware		–		5	–	3	–	1
Trinity (NC)		–		5	–	4	–	0
Western Kentucky State Normal		–		5	–	4	–	0
Union (TN)		–		4	–	4	–	1
Catholic University		–		4	–	4	–	0
Mississippi Normal		–		3	–	3	–	0
Texas Mines		–		3	–	4	–	0
Richmond		–		3	–	5	–	0
Georgetown		–		3	–	6	–	0
East Tennessee State Normal		–		3	–	6	–	0
Davidson		–		3	–	7	–	0
George Washington		–		2	–	8	–	0
Birmingham–Southern		–		1	–	5	–	2
Marshall		–		1	–	7	–	0
Spring Hill		–		1	–	7	–	0

The 1923 Richmond Spiders football team was an American football team that represented the University of Richmond as an independent during the 1923 college football season. Led by tenth-year head coach, Frank Dobson, Richmond compiled a record of 3–5.

== Schedule ==
Date	Time	Opponent	Site	Result	Source
October 6		at Virginia	Lambeth Field; Charlottesville, VA	L 0–9	
October 13		at Maryland	Byrd Stadium; College Park, MD	L 0–23	
October 20	3:00 p.m.	Lynchburg	Stadium Field; Richmond, VA	W 7–6	
October 27		Furman	Stadium Field; Richmond, VA	L 7–22	
November 3		Randolph–Macon	Stadium Field; Richmond, VA	W 12–0	
November 10		at Rutgers	Neilson Field; New Brunswick, NJ	L 0–53	
November 17		Hampden–Sydney	Stadium Field; Richmond, VA	W 7–6	
November 29		William & Mary	Stadium Field; Richmond, VA (rivalry)	L 6–27	
All times are in Eastern time
