= 1923 Davidson Wildcats football team =

American college football season

1923 Davidson Wildcats football
- Conference: Independent
- Record: 3–7
- Head coach: William L. Younger (1st season)
- Home stadium: Richardson Field

1923 Southern college football independents records
	Conf.			Overall
Team	W	L	T	W		L		T
Davis & Elkins		–		8	–	0	–	0
King		–		8	–	0	–	1
VMI		–		9	–	1	–	0
Tennessee Docs		–		6	–	0	–	2
Abilene Christian		–		6	–	1	–	0
West Virginia		–		7	–	1	–	1
Middle Tennessee State Normal		–		4	–	1	–	0
Loyola (LA)		–		5	–	1	–	1
Quantico Marines		–		7	–	2	–	1
Navy		–		5	–	1	–	3
Stetson		–		5	–	2	–	0
Wake Forest		–		6	–	3	–	0
West Tennessee State Normal		–		6	–	3	–	0
William & Mary		–		6	–	3	–	0
Louisville		–		5	–	3	–	0
Delaware		–		5	–	3	–	1
Trinity (NC)		–		5	–	4	–	0
Western Kentucky State Normal		–		5	–	4	–	0
Union (TN)		–		4	–	4	–	1
Catholic University		–		4	–	4	–	0
Mississippi Normal		–		3	–	3	–	0
Texas Mines		–		3	–	4	–	0
Richmond		–		3	–	5	–	0
Georgetown		–		3	–	6	–	0
East Tennessee State Normal		–		3	–	6	–	0
Davidson		–		3	–	7	–	0
George Washington		–		2	–	8	–	0
Birmingham–Southern		–		1	–	5	–	2
Marshall		–		1	–	7	–	0
Spring Hill		–		1	–	7	–	0

The 1923 Davidson Wildcats football team was an American football team that represented Davidson College as an independent during the 1923 college football season. In their first year under head coach William L. Younger, the team compiled a 3–7 record.

== Schedule ==
Date	Opponent	Site	Result	Attendance	Source
September 22	Elon	Cornelius, NC	W 19–0		
September 28	vs. Presbyterian	Winthrop Stadium; Rock Hill, SC	W 3–0		
October 6	at VPI	Miles Field; Blacksburg, VA	L 0–7		
October 13	The Citadel^{†}	Richardson Field; Davidson, NC	W 7–0		
October 20	vs. Wake Forest	Wearn Field; Charlotte, NC	L 0–6	4,000	
October 24	vs. Furman	State Fairgrounds; Columbia, SC	L 0–30		
November 3	vs. NC State	Wearn Field; Charlotte, NC	L 6–12		
November 9	at Clemson	Riggs Field; Calhoun, SC	L 0–12		
November 17	at North Carolina	Emerson Field; Chapel Hill, NC	L 3–14	2,694	
November 29	vs. Trinity (NC)	Wearn Field; Charlotte, NC	L 6–18	2,500	
^{†}Homecoming
