= 1923 William & Mary Indians football team =

American college football season

1923 William & Mary Indians football
- Conference: Independent
- Record: 6–3
- Head coach: J. Wilder Tasker (1st season)
- Captain: John Todd

1923 Southern college football independents records
	Conf.			Overall
Team	W	L	T	W		L		T
Davis & Elkins		–		8	–	0	–	0
King		–		8	–	0	–	1
VMI		–		9	–	1	–	0
Tennessee Docs		–		6	–	0	–	2
West Virginia		–		7	–	1	–	1
Middle Tennessee State Normal		–		4	–	1	–	0
Loyola (LA)		–		5	–	1	–	1
Quantico Marines		–		7	–	2	–	1
Navy		–		5	–	1	–	3
Stetson		–		5	–	2	–	0
Wake Forest		–		6	–	3	–	0
West Tennessee State Normal		–		6	–	3	–	0
William & Mary		–		6	–	3	–	0
Louisville		–		5	–	3	–	0
Delaware		–		5	–	3	–	1
Trinity (NC)		–		5	–	4	–	0
Western Kentucky State Normal		–		5	–	4	–	0
Union (TN)		–		4	–	4	–	1
Catholic University		–		4	–	4	–	0
Mississippi Normal		–		3	–	3	–	0
Texas Mines		–		3	–	4	–	0
Richmond		–		3	–	5	–	0
Georgetown		–		3	–	6	–	0
East Tennessee State Normal		–		3	–	6	–	0
Davidson		–		3	–	7	–	0
George Washington		–		2	–	8	–	0
Birmingham–Southern		–		1	–	5	–	2
Marshall		–		1	–	7	–	0
Spring Hill		–		1	–	7	–	0

The 1923 William & Mary Indians football team represented the College of William & Mary as an independent during the 1923 college football season. Led by first-year head coach J. Wilder Tasker, the Indians compiled a record of 6–3.

== Schedule ==
Date	Opponent	Site	Result	Attendance	Source
September 29	at Navy	Worden Field; Annapolis, MD	L 10–39		
October 6	at Syracuse	Archbold Stadium; Syracuse, NY	L 3–63	10,000	
October 13	Guilford	Williamsburg, VA	W 74–0		
October 20	vs. Trinity (NC)	Rocky Mount, NC	W 21–0		
October 27	Randolph–Macon	Williamsburg, VA	W 27–0		
November 3	vs. Hampden–Sydney	Norfolk, VA	W 20–0		
November 10	Delaware	Williamsburg, VA (rivalry)	W 14–0		
November 17	at Roanoke	Roanoke Fair Grounds; Roanoke, VA	L 7–9		
November 29	at Richmond	Stadium Field; Richmond, VA (rivalry)	W 27–6		
