= 1923 King Tornado football team =

American college football season

1923 King Tornado football
- Conference: Independent
- Record: 8–0–1
- Head coach: A. C. Adams (1st season)
- Captain: Max Osburn
- Home stadium: Tenneva Field

1923 Southern college football independents records
	Conf.			Overall
Team	W	L	T	W		L		T
Davis & Elkins		–		8	–	0	–	0
King		–		8	–	0	–	1
VMI		–		9	–	1	–	0
Tennessee Docs		–		6	–	0	–	2
Abilene Christian		–		6	–	1	–	0
West Virginia		–		7	–	1	–	1
Middle Tennessee State Normal		–		4	–	1	–	0
Loyola (LA)		–		5	–	1	–	1
Quantico Marines		–		7	–	2	–	1
Navy		–		5	–	1	–	3
Stetson		–		5	–	2	–	0
Wake Forest		–		6	–	3	–	0
West Tennessee State Normal		–		6	–	3	–	0
William & Mary		–		6	–	3	–	0
Louisville		–		5	–	3	–	0
Delaware		–		5	–	3	–	1
Trinity (NC)		–		5	–	4	–	0
Western Kentucky State Normal		–		5	–	4	–	0
Union (TN)		–		4	–	4	–	1
Catholic University		–		4	–	4	–	0
Mississippi Normal		–		3	–	3	–	0
Texas Mines		–		3	–	4	–	0
Richmond		–		3	–	5	–	0
Georgetown		–		3	–	6	–	0
East Tennessee State Normal		–		3	–	6	–	0
Davidson		–		3	–	7	–	0
George Washington		–		2	–	8	–	0
Birmingham–Southern		–		1	–	5	–	2
Marshall		–		1	–	7	–	0
Spring Hill		–		1	–	7	–	0

The 1923 King Tornado football team represented King College—now known as King University as an independent during the 1923 college football season. Led by first head coach A. C. Adams, the Tornado compiled a record of 8–0–1. The team's captain was Max Osburn. King played home games at Tenneva Field in Bristol, Virginia.

The Tornado scored 507 points during the first eight games of the season before being shut out in the season finale, a scoreless tie with Carson–Newman.

== Schedule ==
Date	Time	Opponent	Site	Result	Attendance	Source
September 29		Bluefield	Bristol, VA	W 68–0		
October 6		at Tennessee Polytechnic Institute	Cookeville, TN	W 75–0		
October 13	4:15 p.m.	at Elon	Tenneva Field; Bristol, VA	W 55–6		
October 20		at Lenoir	Hickory, NC	W 86–0		
October 30		East Tennessee State Normal	Tenneva Field; Bristol, VA	W 108–0		
November 3	3:30 p.m.	Milligan	Tenneva Field; Bristol, VA	W 40–0		
November 12		at Maryville (TN)	Maryville, TN	W 17–0		
November 17	3:00 p.m.	Lynchburg	Tenneva Field; Bristol, VA	W 58–7		
November 29	2:30 p.m.	Carson–Newman	Tenneva Field; Bristol, VA	T 0–0	3,500–4,000	
All times are in Eastern time
