= 1923 George Washington Hatchetites football team =

American college football season

1923 George Washington Hatchetites football
- Conference: Independent
- Record: 2–8
- Head coach: William Quigley (3rd season)
- Home stadium: Griffith Stadium

1923 Southern college football independents records
	Conf.			Overall
Team	W	L	T	W		L		T
Davis & Elkins		–		8	–	0	–	0
King		–		8	–	0	–	1
VMI		–		9	–	1	–	0
Tennessee Docs		–		6	–	0	–	2
Abilene Christian		–		6	–	1	–	0
West Virginia		–		7	–	1	–	1
Middle Tennessee State Normal		–		4	–	1	–	0
Loyola (LA)		–		5	–	1	–	1
Quantico Marines		–		7	–	2	–	1
Navy		–		5	–	1	–	3
Stetson		–		5	–	2	–	0
Wake Forest		–		6	–	3	–	0
West Tennessee State Normal		–		6	–	3	–	0
William & Mary		–		6	–	3	–	0
Louisville		–		5	–	3	–	0
Delaware		–		5	–	3	–	1
Trinity (NC)		–		5	–	4	–	0
Western Kentucky State Normal		–		5	–	4	–	0
Union (TN)		–		4	–	4	–	1
Catholic University		–		4	–	4	–	0
Mississippi Normal		–		3	–	3	–	0
Texas Mines		–		3	–	4	–	0
Richmond		–		3	–	5	–	0
Georgetown		–		3	–	6	–	0
East Tennessee State Normal		–		3	–	6	–	0
Davidson		–		3	–	7	–	0
George Washington		–		2	–	8	–	0
Birmingham–Southern		–		1	–	5	–	2
Marshall		–		1	–	7	–	0
Spring Hill		–		1	–	7	–	0

The 1923 George Washington Hatchetites football team was an American football team that represented George Washington University as an independent during the 1923 college football season. In their third season under head coach William Quigley, the team compiled a 2–8 record.

== Schedule ==
Date	Opponent	Site	Result	Source
September 29	vs. Georgetown	Griffith Stadium; Washington, DC	L 0–20	
October 6	at Western Maryland	Westminster, MD	L 0–20	
October 13	at Juniata	Huntingdon, PA	W 14–0	
October 20	Drexel	Wilson Memorial Stadium; Washington, DC	W 8–0	
October 27	at Quantico Marines	Norfolk, VA	L 0–40	
November 3	at Saint Joseph's	Philadelphia, PA	L 7–13	
November 12	at Roanoke	Fair Grounds; Roanoke, VA	L 0–33	
November 17	at Delaware	Frazer Field; Newark, DE	L 7–19	
November 24	at Johns Hopkins	Homewood Field; Baltimore, MD	L 6–62	
November 29	vs. Catholic University	Griffith Stadium; Washington, DC	L 0–27	
