= 1923 Western Kentucky State Normal football team =

American college football season

1923 Western Kentucky State Normal football
- Conference: Independent
- Record: 5–4
- Head coach: Edgar Diddle (2nd season)
- Captain: Edward R. Ward

1923 Southern college football independents records
	Conf.			Overall
Team	W	L	T	W		L		T
Davis & Elkins		–		8	–	0	–	0
King		–		8	–	0	–	1
VMI		–		9	–	1	–	0
Tennessee Docs		–		6	–	0	–	2
Abilene Christian		–		6	–	1	–	0
West Virginia		–		7	–	1	–	1
Middle Tennessee State Normal		–		4	–	1	–	0
Loyola (LA)		–		5	–	1	–	1
Quantico Marines		–		7	–	2	–	1
Navy		–		5	–	1	–	3
Stetson		–		5	–	2	–	0
Wake Forest		–		6	–	3	–	0
West Tennessee State Normal		–		6	–	3	–	0
William & Mary		–		6	–	3	–	0
Louisville		–		5	–	3	–	0
Delaware		–		5	–	3	–	1
Trinity (NC)		–		5	–	4	–	0
Western Kentucky State Normal		–		5	–	4	–	0
Union (TN)		–		4	–	4	–	1
Catholic University		–		4	–	4	–	0
Mississippi Normal		–		3	–	3	–	0
Texas Mines		–		3	–	4	–	0
Richmond		–		3	–	5	–	0
Georgetown		–		3	–	6	–	0
East Tennessee State Normal		–		3	–	6	–	0
Davidson		–		3	–	7	–	0
George Washington		–		2	–	8	–	0
Birmingham–Southern		–		1	–	5	–	2
Marshall		–		1	–	7	–	0
Spring Hill		–		1	–	7	–	0

The 1923 Western Kentucky State Normal football team represented Western Kentucky State Normal School and Teachers College (now known as Western Kentucky University) in the 1923 college football season. They were coached by Edgar Diddle in his second year.

== Schedule ==
Date	Opponent	Site	Result	Source
September 29	Louisville	Bowling Green, KY	W 19–7	
October 6	at St. Xavier	Corcoran Field; Cincinnati, OH	L 14–21	
October 20	Cumberland (KY)	Bowling Green, KY	L 6–13	
October 27	Western State Normal	Bowling Green, KY	L 0–26	
November 3	at Centenary	Centenary Athletic Field; Shreveport, LA	L 6–75	
November 10	Transylvania	Bowling Green, KY	W 13–6	
November 16	Kentucky Wesleyan	Bowling Green, KY	W 24–6	
November 17	Bryson	Bowling Green, KY	W 25–13	
December 1	Bethel (KY)	Bowling Green, KY	W 19–0	
