= 1923 college football season =

American college football season

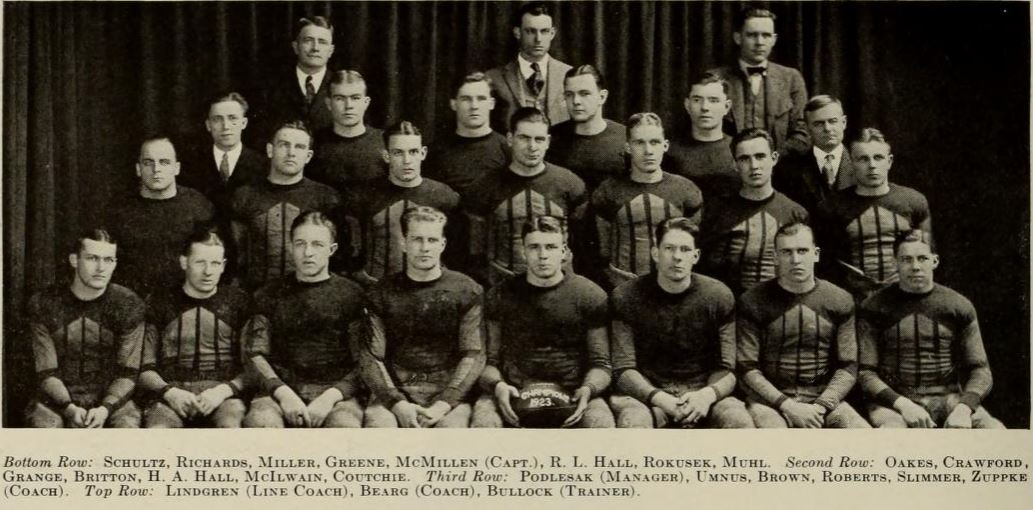
- Illinois Fighting Illini
- Number of bowls: 1
- Bowl games: January 1, 1924
- Champion(s): Illinois; Michigan

The 1923 college football season saw several teams finish their seasons unbeaten and untied. As such, numerous schools claim a national championship for the 1923 season. Illinois (coached by Bob Zuppke) and Michigan (coached by Fielding "Hurry-Up" Yost), both members of what is now the Big Ten Conference, finished with records of 8–0 and were selected as national champion by multiple selectors. Illinois featured break-out star Red Grange. Ivy League teams Yale and Cornell also had undefeated seasons. Cornell was selected as national champion by one selector.

Southern Methodist University (SMU) had a record of 9–0, thanks to coach Ray Morrison bringing the forward pass to the southwest. Teams that had no defeats, but had been tied, were California (9–0–1), Texas (8–0–1), and Kansas (5–0–3).

In the 1924 Rose Bowl, Washington tied Navy 14–14.

== Conference and program changes ==
=== Conference establishments ===
- The Indiana Intercollegiate Conference, established in 1922 and active until 1950, began football play in 1923.
- The Iowa Intercollegiate Athletic Conference, now a Division III conference, began football play in 1923.

=== Conference membership changes ===
School	1922 Conference	1923 Conference
Connecticut Aggies	Athletic League of New England State Colleges	New England
Maine Black Bears	Independent	New England
New Hampshire Wildcats	Independent	New England
Rhode Island Rams	Athletic League of New England State Colleges	New England
Texas Christian Horned Frogs	Independent	Southwest

=== Program changes ===
- University of Washington Sun Dodgers officially changed their nickname to their present moniker, the Huskies.

== September ==
September 29 Notre Dame opened its season with a 74–0 win over visiting Kalamazoo College. After a warmup game against a team of Cal alumni, California beat St. Mary's 49–0. Cornell beat St. Bonaventure 41–6, Dartmouth beat Norwich 13–0, and Syracuse beat Hobart 33–0.

== October ==
October 6 Illinois beat Nebraska 24–7 and Michigan defeated Case 36–0. Syracuse beat William & Mary 61–3. Notre Dame beat Lombard College 14–0. Kansas defeated Creighton 6–0. California defeated Santa Clara 48–0. Following wins over the crews of USS Mississippi (33–0) and USS New York (42–7), Washington beat Willamette 54–0. Vanderbilt beat Howard 27–0. Dartmouth beat Maine 6–0. Yale beat North Carolina 53–0, and Cornell beat Susquehanna 84–0.

October 13 Notre Dame beat Army 13–0 Dartmouth beat Boston University 24–0, and Yale beat Georgia 40–0. Michigan beat Vanderbilt 3–0, and Illinois beat Butler 21–7 California beat the Olympic Club 16–0 and Washington beat Whitman College 19–0. Kansas beat Oklahoma State 9–0.

October 20 Cornell beat Williams 28–6, Yale beat Bucknell 29–14 and Dartmouth beat Vermont 27–2. Notre Dame won at Princeton 25–2. Illinois won at Iowa 9–6 and Michigan beat Ohio State 23–0. Texas beat Vanderbilt 16–0. At Lincoln, Kansas and Nebraska played to a 0–0 tie. California beat Oregon State 26–0 and Washington beat visiting USC 22–0.

October 27 Cornell defeated Colgate 34–7. Yale beat Brown 21–0 and Dartmouth beat Harvard 16–0 Notre Dame beat Georgia Tech 35–7. In Chicago, Illinois beat Northwestern 29–0. Michigan beat Michigan State 37–0. Kansas and Kansas State played to a scoreless tie (0–0). At Portland, Oregon, California continued its streak of shutouts with a 9–0 win over Washington State. Washington beat Puget Sound 24–0. Vanderbilt defeated Tulane 17–0.

== November ==
November 3 Yale beat Army 31–10 Notre Dame beat Purdue 34–7 Dartmouth (5–0–0) hosted Cornell (4–0–0) and in a triumph of Big Red over Big Green, Cornell won 32–7.

Illinois and Chicago, both unbeaten (4–0–0) met at Champaign, with the Illini winning 7–0. Michigan won at Iowa 9–3. Kansas won at Oklahoma 7–3. California held visiting Nevada scoreless for its seventh straight shutout, but could not score either, suffering a 0–0 tie. Washington stayed unbeaten and untied with a 14–0 win at Oregon State. Mississippi A&M tied Vanderbilt in the rain, 0–0.

November 10 At Boston's Fenway Park, Dartmouth beat Brown 16–14, while at New York's Polo Grounds, Cornell beat Columbia 35–0. Yale beat Maryland 16–14. Notre Dame suffered its first loss, at Nebraska, 14–7.

Meanwhile, Illinois beat Wisconsin 10–0. Michigan defeated the Quantico Marines football team 29–6. In Los Angeles, California beat USC 13–7. Washington beat Montana 26–14. Kansas beat Washington University in St. Louis 83–0. Vanderbilt beat Tennessee 51–7.

November 17 California (7–0–1) hosted Washington (8–0–0) and won 9–0. Illinois beat Mississippi State 27–0, and Michigan won at Wisconsin 6–3, as both teams stayed unbeaten. Notre Dame beat Butler 34–7. Yale defeated Princeton 27–0. Kansas beat Drake 17–0. Vanderbilt defeats Georgia 35–7.

November 24 In Pittsburgh, Notre Dame defeated Carnegie Tech 26–0. Dartmouth beat Colby College 62–0, and Cornell defeated Johns Hopkins 52–0. Yale closed a perfect season with a 13–0 win over Harvard. Illinois closed its season at 8–0–0 with a 9–0 win at Ohio State, while Michigan closed a perfect season with a 10–0 win over Minnesota. California closed its season with a 9–0 win over Stanford. Washington beat Washington State 24–7, and though it was second to Cal in the Pacific Coast Conference, received the invitation to the Rose Bowl to face (5–1–2) Navy.

On Thanksgiving Day, which was held on November 29 in 1923, Furman, which had won its first ten games, lost its final game to visiting Clemson, 7–6. In Philadelphia, Cornell closed a perfect season with a 14–7 win over Pennsylvania. Dartmouth finished with a 31–6 win over Columbia at New York. Kansas and Missouri played to a 3–3 tie, giving the Jayhawks an unbeaten, if not untied (5–0–3) finish. Notre Dame won at St. Louis 13–0. Vanderbilt beat Sewanee 7–0. Texas beat Texas A&M 6–0. Florida beat Alabama 16–6.

December 1 Washington beat Oregon 26–7.

== Rose Bowl ==
A crowd of 48,000 turned out to watch Navy and Washington play an exciting game. Ira McKee's passing put Navy ahead 14–7 at halftime, after Washington's George Wilson had tied the game at 7–7. In the fourth quarter, Washington's Roy Petrie picked off a pass at Navy's 10 yard line, setting up the Huskies' tying touchdown for a 14 to 14 finish. Later, it turned out that Washington halfback Les Sherman, whose two extra point attempts had tied the game, had played with a broken toe, while fullback Elmer Tesreau had played with a fractured leg.

== Conference standings ==
=== Major conference standings ===
1923 Big Ten Conference football standings
	Conf.					Overall
Team	W		L		T	W		L		T
Illinois +	5	–	0	–	0	8	–	0	–	0
Michigan +	4	–	0	–	0	8	–	0	–	0
Chicago	5	–	1	–	0	7	–	1	–	0
Minnesota	2	–	1	–	1	5	–	1	–	1
Iowa	3	–	3	–	0	5	–	3	–	0
Indiana	2	–	2	–	0	3	–	4	–	0
Wisconsin	1	–	3	–	1	3	–	3	–	1
Ohio State	1	–	4	–	0	3	–	4	–	1
Purdue	1	–	4	–	0	2	–	5	–	1
Northwestern	0	–	6	–	0	2	–	6	–	0
+ – Conference co-champions

1923 Missouri Valley Conference football standings
	Conf.					Overall
Team	W		L		T	W		L		T
Kansas +	3	–	0	–	3	5	–	0	–	3
Nebraska +	3	–	0	–	2	4	–	2	–	2
Drake	3	–	1	–	0	5	–	2	–	0
Iowa State	3	–	2	–	1	4	–	3	–	1
Kansas State	2	–	2	–	2	4	–	2	–	2
Oklahoma	2	–	4	–	0	3	–	5	–	0
Missouri	1	–	3	–	2	2	–	3	–	3
Grinnell	1	–	3	–	0	2	–	6	–	0
Washington University	1	–	4	–	0	3	–	5	–	0
+ – Conference co-champions

1923 Northwest Conference football standings
	Conf.					Overall
Team	W		L		T	W		L		T
Washington $	6	–	0	–	0	10	–	1	–	1
Idaho	3	–	0	–	1	5	–	2	–	1
Oregon Agricultural	2	–	2	–	1	4	–	5	–	2
Oregon	3	–	3	–	1	3	–	4	–	1
Washington State	2	–	2	–	1	2	–	4	–	1
Pacific (OR)	2	–	3	–	0	5	–	3	–	0
Whitman	1	–	3	–	0	1	–	5	–	0
Montana	1	–	4	–	0	4	–	4	–	0
Willamette	0	–	3	–	0	2	–	5	–	1
$ – Conference champion

1923 Pacific Coast Conference football standings
	Conf.					Overall
Team	W		L		T	W		L		T
California $	5	–	0	–	0	9	–	0	–	1
Washington^	4	–	1	–	0	10	–	1	–	1
Stanford	2	–	2	–	0	7	–	2	–	0
USC	2	–	2	–	0	6	–	2	–	0
Idaho	2	–	2	–	1	5	–	2	–	1
Oregon Agricultural	1	–	3	–	1	4	–	5	–	2
Washington State	1	–	3	–	1	2	–	4	–	1
Oregon	0	–	4	–	1	3	–	4	–	1
$ – Conference champion; ^ Selected as Rose Bowl representative

1923 Rocky Mountain Conference football standings
	Conf.					Overall
Team	W		L		T	W		L		T
Colorado $	7	–	0	–	0	9	–	0	–	0
Colorado College	6	–	1	–	1	6	–	1	–	1
Colorado Agricultural	5	–	1	–	1	5	–	2	–	1
Utah Agricultural	4	–	2	–	0	5	–	2	–	0
Denver	4	–	3	–	0	6	–	3	–	0
Utah	2	–	3	–	0	4	–	3	–	0
Montana State	1	–	2	–	0	5	–	4	–	0
Colorado Mines	1	–	5	–	0	2	–	5	–	0
BYU	1	–	5	–	0	2	–	5	–	0
Wyoming	0	–	7	–	0	0	–	8	–	0
$ – Conference champion

1923 Southern Conference football standings
	Conf.					Overall
Team	W		L		T	W		L		T
Washington & Lee +	4	–	0	–	1	6	–	3	–	1
Vanderbilt * +	3	–	0	–	1	5	–	2	–	1
VPI	4	–	1	–	0	6	–	3	–	0
Alabama	4	–	1	–	1	7	–	2	–	1
Maryland	2	–	1	–	0	7	–	2	–	1
Florida	1	–	0	–	2	6	–	1	–	2
North Carolina	2	–	1	–	1	5	–	3	–	1
Georgia	3	–	2	–	0	5	–	3	–	1
Mississippi A&M	2	–	1	–	2	5	–	2	–	2
Tennessee	4	–	3	–	0	5	–	4	–	1
Tulane	2	–	2	–	1	6	–	3	–	1
Clemson	1	–	1	–	1	5	–	2	–	1
Georgia Tech	0	–	0	–	4	3	–	2	–	4
NC State	1	–	4	–	0	3	–	7	–	0
Auburn	0	–	1	–	3	3	–	3	–	3
Kentucky	0	–	2	–	2	4	–	3	–	2
Virginia	0	–	3	–	1	3	–	5	–	1
LSU	0	–	3	–	0	3	–	5	–	1
Ole Miss	0	–	4	–	0	4	–	6	–	0
South Carolina	0	–	4	–	0	4	–	6	–	0
+ – Conference co-champions; * co-member of SIAA

1923 Southwest Conference football standings
	Conf.					Overall
Team	W		L		T	W		L		T
SMU $	5	–	0	–	0	9	–	0	–	0
Texas	2	–	0	–	1	8	–	0	–	1
TCU	2	–	1	–	0	4	–	5	–	0
Baylor	1	–	1	–	2	5	–	1	–	2
Arkansas	2	–	2	–	0	6	–	2	–	1
Oklahoma A&M	1	–	3	–	0	2	–	8	–	0
Rice	1	–	4	–	0	3	–	5	–	0
Texas A&M	0	–	3	–	1	5	–	3	–	1
$ – Conference champion

=== Independents ===
1923 Eastern college football independents records
	Conf.			Overall
Team	W	L	T	W		L		T
Cornell		–		8	–	0	–	0
Yale		–		8	–	0	–	0
St. John's		–		5	–	0	–	1
Dartmouth		–		8	–	1	–	0
Syracuse		–		8	–	1	–	0
Boston College		–		7	–	1	–	1
Rutgers		–		7	–	1	–	1
Washington & Jefferson		–		6	–	1	–	1
Holy Cross		–		8	–	2	–	0
Lafayette		–		6	–	1	–	2
Tufts		–		6	–	2	–	0
Army		–		6	–	2	–	1
Colgate		–		6	–	2	–	1
Geneva		–		6	–	2	–	1
Lehigh		–		6	–	2	–	1
NYU		–		6	–	2	–	1
Penn State		–		6	–	2	–	1
Vermont		–		6	–	3	–	1
Brown		–		6	–	4	–	0
Harvard		–		4	–	3	–	1
Carnegie Tech		–		4	–	3	–	1
Penn		–		5	–	4	–	0
Pittsburgh		–		5	–	4	–	0
Bucknell		–		4	–	4	–	1
Columbia		–		4	–	4	–	1
Duquesne		–		4	–	4	–	0
Princeton		–		3	–	3	–	1
Franklin & Marshall		–		3	–	5	–	1
Drexel		–		2	–	6	–	0
Buffalo		–		2	–	5	–	1
Fordham		–		2	–	7	–	0
Boston University		–		1	–	6	–	0
Villanova		–		0	–	7	–	1
Temple		–		0	–	5	–	0
CCNY		–		0	–	7	–	0
Springfield		–		0	–	7	–	0

1923 Midwestern college football independents records
	Conf.			Overall
Team	W	L	T	W		L		T
Marquette		–		8	–	0	–	0
Michigan Mines		–		2	–	0	–	0
Notre Dame		–		9	–	1	–	0
Western State Normal		–		6	–	1	–	1
Haskell		–		11	–	2	–	1
Butler		–		7	–	2	–	0
Central Michigan		–		5	–	1	–	2
Baldwin–Wallace		–		5	–	2	–	1
Cincinnati		–		6	–	3	–	0
Loyola (IL)		–		6	–	3	–	0
Saint Louis		–		5	–	3	–	1
Detroit		–		4	–	3	–	2
Wabash		–		4	–	3	–	2
John Carroll		–		4	–	4	–	1
Valparaiso		–		2	–	2	–	1
Dayton		–		4	–	5	–	0
Michigan Agricultural		–		3	–	5	–	0
Fairmount		–		2	–	4	–	2
Kent State		–		0	–	5	–	0

1923 Southern college football independents records
	Conf.			Overall
Team	W	L	T	W		L		T
Davis & Elkins		–		8	–	0	–	0
King		–		8	–	0	–	1
VMI		–		9	–	1	–	0
Tennessee Docs		–		6	–	0	–	2
Abilene Christian		–		6	–	1	–	0
West Virginia		–		7	–	1	–	1
Middle Tennessee State Normal		–		4	–	1	–	0
Loyola (LA)		–		5	–	1	–	1
Quantico Marines		–		7	–	2	–	1
Navy		–		5	–	1	–	3
Stetson		–		5	–	2	–	0
Wake Forest		–		6	–	3	–	0
West Tennessee State Normal		–		6	–	3	–	0
William & Mary		–		6	–	3	–	0
Louisville		–		5	–	3	–	0
Delaware		–		5	–	3	–	1
Tennessee State		–		3	–	2	–	0
Trinity (NC)		–		5	–	4	–	0
Western Kentucky State Normal		–		5	–	4	–	0
Union (TN)		–		4	–	4	–	1
Catholic University		–		4	–	4	–	0
Mississippi Normal		–		3	–	3	–	0
Texas Mines		–		3	–	4	–	0
Richmond		–		3	–	5	–	0
Georgetown		–		3	–	6	–	0
East Tennessee State Normal		–		3	–	6	–	0
Davidson		–		3	–	7	–	0
George Washington		–		2	–	8	–	0
Birmingham–Southern		–		1	–	5	–	2
Marshall		–		1	–	7	–	0
Spring Hill		–		1	–	7	–	0

1923 Western college football independents records
	Conf.			Overall
Team	W	L	T	W		L		T
New Mexico A&M		–		9	–	0	–	0
La Verne		–		7	–	2	–	1
Hawaii		–		5	–	1	–	2
Saint Mary's		–		5	–	3	–	1
Arizona		–		5	–	3	–	0
Tempe Normal		–		4	–	2	–	0
Gonzaga		–		4	–	3	–	0
Santa Clara		–		3	–	4	–	1
New Mexico		–		3	–	5	–	0
Nevada		–		2	–	3	–	3
Santa Barbara State		–		3	–	3	–	0
Cal Aggies		–		2	–	7	–	0

=== Minor conferences ===
Conference	Champion(s)	Record
California Coast Conference	Fresno State Normal	3–0
Central Intercollegiate Athletics Association	Virginia Union	6–0–1
Inter-Normal Athletic Conference of Wisconsin	Oshkosh Normal	5–0
Kansas Collegiate Athletic Conference	Unknown	—
Illinois Intercollegiate Athletic Conference	Lombard	—
Iowa Intercollegiate Athletic Conference	Simpson	7–0
Louisiana Intercollegiate Athletic Association	Centenary (LA)	3–0
Michigan Intercollegiate Athletic Association	Alma	5–0
Midwest Collegiate Athletic Conference	Beloit; Carleton	4–0; 2–0
Minnesota Intercollegiate Athletic Conference	St. Olaf	—
Nebraska Intercollegiate Conference	Unknown	—
North Central Intercollegiate Conference	Morningside	3–1
Ohio Athletic Conference	College of Wooster	8–0
Oklahoma Intercollegiate Conference	Central State Teachers	—
South Dakota Intercollegiate Conference	Columbus College; Dakota Wesleyan; Northern Normal and Industrial	—
Southern California Intercollegiate Athletic Conference	Caltech; Pomona	4–1
Southern Intercollegiate Athletic Conference	Fisk; Morehouse	—
Southwestern Athletic Conference	Wiley	—
Tri-Normal League	State Normal–Cheney; State Normal–Bellingham	4–1; 2–1

=== Minor conference standings ===
1923 California Coast Conference football standings
	Conf.					Overall
Team	W		L		T	W		L		T
Pacific (CA) +	4	–	0	–	0	7	–	0	–	0
Fresno State +	3	–	0	–	0	7	–	2	–	0
Chico State	2	–	1	–	0	5	–	2	–	2
Cal Poly	2	–	1	–	0	3	–	3	–	0
Bakersfield	1	–	1	–	0	4	–	4	–	0
Modesto	1	–	1	–	0	3	–	5	–	0
San Mateo	1	–	3	–	0	?	–	?	–	?
Sacramento	0	–	3	–	0	?	–	?	–	?
San Jose State	0	–	4	–	0	0	–	6	–	0
+ – Conference co-champions

1923 Colored Intercollegiate Athletic Association football standings
	Conf.					Overall
Team	W		L		T	W		L		T
Virginia Union $	5	–	0	–	0	5	–	0	–	2
Howard	3	–	0	–	1	7	–	0	–	1
Hampton	4	–	2	–	0	5	–	2	–	0
Virginia Normal	3	–	3	–	0	4	–	3	–	0
Lincoln (PA)	1	–	1	–	2	5	–	1	–	2
Saint Paul (VA)	2	–	3	–	1	6	–	3	–	1
Virginia Seminary	1	–	4	–	0	3	–	6	–	0
Shaw	0	–	5	–	0	0	–	5	–	0
$ – Conference champion

1923 Illinois Intercollegiate Athletic Conference football standings
	Conf.					Overall
Team	W		L		T	W		L		T
Lombard $	4	–	0	–	0	6	–	1	–	0
Mount Morris	2	–	0	–	1	2	–	1	–	2
Knox (IL)	4	–	1	–	0	7	–	1	–	0
Illinois Wesleyan	7	–	2	–	0	7	–	2	–	0
Bradley	6	–	2	–	0	6	–	2	–	0
Southern Illinois	2	–	1	–	0	3	–	2	–	2
Lincoln (IL)	2	–	1	–	2	?	–	?	–	?
Eastern Illinois	3	–	2	–	2	4	–	2	–	2
Monmouth (IL)	4	–	3	–	1	6	–	3	–	1
Illinois College	3	–	3	–	1	3	–	4	–	1
Eureka	4	–	4	–	0	4	–	4	–	0
Millikin	4	–	4	–	0	4	–	5	–	0
Carthage	2	–	3	–	1	4	–	3	–	1
Illinois State Normal	2	–	3	–	2	2	–	4	–	2
Augustana (IL)	3	–	5	–	0	3	–	5	–	0
St. Viator	1	–	2	–	0	5	–	3	–	2
Lake Forest	1	–	3	–	0	2	–	6	–	1
Blackburn	1	–	4	–	1	1	–	5	–	1
Western Illinois	1	–	4	–	1	1	–	6	–	1
Wheaton (IL)	0	–	1	–	1	2	–	3	–	2
Northern Illinois State	0	–	2	–	3	1	–	4	–	3
Shurtleff	0	–	4	–	1	?	–	?	–	?
McKendree	0	–	4	–	0	1	–	5	–	1
$ – Conference champion

1923 Indiana Intercollegiate Conference football standings
	Conf.					Overall
Team	W		L		T	W		L		T
Notre Dame $	1	–	0	–	0	9	–	1	–	0
Butler	4	–	1	–	0	7	–	2	–	0
Rose Poly	4	–	2	–	0	4	–	4	–	0
Franklin	3	–	2	–	1	5	–	2	–	1
Wabash	2	–	1	–	1	4	–	3	–	2
Evansville	2	–	1	–	0	3	–	2	–	0
DePauw	2	–	2	–	1	4	–	2	–	1
Indiana State	2	–	2	–	0	2	–	3	–	0
Hanover	2	–	4	–	1	2	–	6	–	1
Earlham	1	–	3	–	0	2	–	5	–	0
Central Normal	1	–	3	–	0	2	–	6	–	0
Oakland City	1	–	4	–	0	1	–	5	–	0
$ – Conference champion

1923 Iowa Conference football standings
	Conf.					Overall
Team	W		L		T	W		L		T
Simpson (IA) $	7	–	0	–	0	8	–	1	–	0
Penn (IA)	5	–	2	–	0	5	–	4	–	0
Western Union	2	–	1	–	0	6	–	1	–	0
St. Ambrose	2	–	1	–	0	5	–	2	–	1
Buena Vista	2	–	1	–	0	4	–	3	–	0
Des Moines	1	–	1	–	0	5	–	4	–	1
Luther	0	–	0	–	1	4	–	1	–	2
Central (IA)	1	–	1	–	0	1	–	2	–	0
Upper Iowa	2	–	3	–	1	2	–	5	–	1
Iowa State Teachers	3	–	5	–	0	3	–	5	–	0
Morningside	1	–	2	–	0	5	–	2	–	0
Parsons	1	–	2	–	0	4	–	5	–	0
Iowa Wesleyan	0	–	4	–	0	1	–	7	–	1
Ellsworth	0	–	6	–	0	0	–	6	–	0
$ – Conference champion

1923 Kansas Collegiate Athletic Conference football standings
	Conf.					Overall
Team	W		L		T	W		L		T
Sterling $	7	–	1	–	1	7	–	1	–	1
Friends	5	–	1	–	0	5	–	2	–	0
Emporia Teachers	5	–	1	–	1	5	–	1	–	1
McPherson	6	–	2	–	1	6	–	2	–	1
Baker	3	–	1	–	4	4	–	1	–	4
Ottawa	4	–	2	–	2	5	–	2	–	2
College of Emporia	5	–	3	–	0	5	–	3	–	0
Hays Teachers	3	–	3	–	2	4	–	3	–	2
Pittsburg Teachers	2	–	2	–	2	3	–	3	–	2
Fairmount	2	–	2	–	2	2	–	4	–	2
St. Mary's (KS)	3	–	4	–	0	4	–	4	–	0
Kansas Wesleyan	2	–	5	–	1	4	–	5	–	1
Bethany (KS)	2	–	7	–	0	2	–	7	–	0
Southwestern (KS)	1	–	5	–	2	2	–	5	–	2
Bethel (KS)	0	–	5	–	0	0	–	5	–	0
Washburn	0	–	6	–	2	0	–	8	–	2
$ – Conference champion

1923 Michigan Intercollegiate Athletic Association football standings
	Conf.					Overall
Team	W		L		T	W		L		T
Alma $	5	–	0	–	0	6	–	2	–	1
Albion	4	–	1	–	0	7	–	2	–	0
Olivet	3	–	2	–	0	5	–	3	–	1
Hillsdale	1	–	3	–	1	3	–	4	–	1
Michigan State Normal	1	–	3	–	1	2	–	5	–	1
Kalamazoo	0	–	5	–	0	0	–	10	–	0
$ – Conference champion

1923 Midwest Conference football standings
	Conf.					Overall
Team	W		L		T	W		L		T
Beloit +	4	–	0	–	0	6	–	1	–	1
Carleton +	2	–	0	–	0	5	–	2	–	0
Lawrence	2	–	1	–	1	4	–	3	–	1
Knox	2	–	2	–	0	5	–	4	–	0
Coe	1	–	1	–	0	6	–	2	–	0
Cornell (IA)	1	–	2	–	1	4	–	3	–	1
Millikin	0	–	1	–	0	4	–	5	–	0
Ripon	0	–	1	–	0	2	–	4	–	0
Hamline	0	–	3	–	0	4	–	3	–	0
+ – Conference co-champions

1923 Minnesota Intercollegiate Athletic Conference football standings
	Conf.					Overall
Team	W		L		T	W		L		T
St. Olaf $	4	–	1	–	0	6	–	1	–	1
Carleton	3	–	1	–	0	5	–	2	–	0
Hamline	3	–	1	–	0	4	–	3	–	0
St. Thomas (MN)	1	–	0	–	0	5	–	0	–	0
Macalester	2	–	3	–	0	3	–	3	–	1
Concordia (MN)	1	–	3	–	0	2	–	3	–	1
Saint John's (MN)	1	–	3	–	0	2	–	3	–	0
Gustavus Adolphus	1	–	4	–	0	2	–	5	–	0
$ – Conference champion

1923 Missouri Intercollegiate Athletic Association football standings
	Conf.					Overall
Team	W		L		T	W		L		T
Missouri Valley $	5	–	0	–	1	?	–	?	–	?
Missouri Wesleyan	7	–	1	–	1	?	–	?	–	?
Springfield (MO)	3	–	1	–	0	7	–	2	–	0
Missouri Mines	1	–	0	–	0	4	–	4	–	0
William Jewell	5	–	2	–	0	5	–	3	–	0
Warrensburg	4	–	2	–	2	5	–	3	–	2
Cape Girardeau	1	–	1	–	0	4	–	3	–	0
Maryville (MO)	2	–	3	–	1	3	–	5	–	1
Westminster (MO)	2	–	5	–	0	3	–	5	–	0
Culver–Stockton	1	–	3	–	0	3	–	5	–	1
Drury	1	–	3	–	0	1	–	4	–	0
Kirksville	1	–	4	–	0	5	–	4	–	0
Central (MO)	1	–	4	–	2	1	–	5	–	2
Central Wesleyan	0	–	1	–	1	2	–	4	–	1
Tarkio	0	–	2	–	1	?	–	?	–	?
$ – Conference champion

1923 Nebraska Intercollegiate Conference football standings
	Conf.					Overall
Team	W		L		T	W		L		T
Hastings $	7	–	0	–	0	?	–	?	–	?
Chadron Normal	4	–	0	–	1	7	–	0	–	1
Midland	7	–	1	–	1	8	–	2	–	1
Nebraska Wesleyan	4	–	1	–	1	6	–	1	–	2
Peru Normal	4	–	1	–	2	6	–	1	–	2
Grand Island	4	–	3	–	0	5	–	4	–	0
Doane	3	–	4	–	0	3	–	4	–	0
Kearney Normal	2	–	4	–	1	2	–	4	–	1
Wayne Normal	2	–	4	–	0	2	–	6	–	0
Nebraska Central	1	–	6	–	1	1	–	6	–	1
York (NE)	0	–	6	–	1	0	–	6	–	1
Cotner	0	–	8	–	0	0	–	8	–	0
$ – Conference champion

1923 New England Conference football standings
	Conf.					Overall
Team	W		L		T	W		L		T
Maine $	3	–	0	–	0	5	–	3	–	0
New Hampshire	1	–	1	–	1	4	–	4	–	1
Connecticut	1	–	1	–	1	3	–	4	–	1
Rhode Island State	0	–	3	–	0	1	–	5	–	1
Massachusetts	0	–	0	–	0	2	–	5	–	0
$ – Conference champion

1923 North Central Conference football standings
	Conf.					Overall
Team	W		L		T	W		L		T
Morningside $	3	–	1	–	0	5	–	2	–	0
North Dakota	2	–	1	–	0	5	–	3	–	0
Des Moines	2	–	1	–	1	5	–	4	–	1
South Dakota State	2	–	3	–	0	3	–	4	–	0
Creighton	1	–	2	–	0	5	–	5	–	0
North Dakota Agricultural	1	–	2	–	0	2	–	4	–	1
South Dakota	1	–	3	–	1	4	–	3	–	1
Nebraska Wesleyan *	1	–	0	–	1	6	–	1	–	2
$ – Conference champion; * – ineligible for conference title; too few games played

1923 Ohio Athletic Conference football standings
	Conf.					Overall
Team	W		L		T	W		L		T
Wooster $	8	–	0	–	0	9	–	0	–	0
Ohio Wesleyan	5	–	0	–	0	6	–	2	–	0
Wittenberg	5	–	1	–	0	7	–	1	–	0
Hiram	5	–	2	–	0	5	–	2	–	0
Cincinnati	5	–	2	–	0	6	–	3	–	0
Otterbein	4	–	3	–	0	5	–	3	–	0
Western Reserve	5	–	4	–	0	5	–	4	–	0
Muskingum	3	–	3	–	0	5	–	3	–	0
Oberlin	3	–	3	–	1	4	–	3	–	1
Mount Union	3	–	3	–	0	5	–	4	–	0
Denison	2	–	2	–	2	3	–	3	–	2
Ohio Northern	3	–	4	–	0	6	–	4	–	0
Akron	2	–	3	–	1	4	–	3	–	1
Ohio	2	–	4	–	1	3	–	5	–	1
St. Xavier	1	–	2	–	0	4	–	4	–	0
Miami (OH)	1	–	4	–	1	3	–	4	–	1
Kenyon	1	–	5	–	0	1	–	6	–	0
Heidelberg	0	–	5	–	0	3	–	5	–	0
Case	0	–	8	–	0	0	–	9	–	0
$ – Conference champion

1923 South Dakota Intercollegiate Conference football standings
	Conf.					Overall
Team	W		L		T	W		L		T
Columbus (SD) +	5	–	0	–	0	5	–	1	–	0
Northern Normal +	4	–	0	–	1	4	–	1	–	2
Dakota Wesleyan +	4	–	0	–	1	4	–	2	–	1
South Dakota Mines	3	–	1	–	0	4	–	2	–	0
Augustana (SD)	3	–	3	–	1	4	–	3	–	1
Huron	3	–	3	–	1	3	–	3	–	1
Yankton	2	–	3	–	0	2	–	6	–	0
Eastern Normal	1	–	5	–	0	1	–	5	–	0
Spearfish	0	–	1	–	0	0	–	5	–	0
Southern Normal	0	–	3	–	0	0	–	3	–	0
Sioux Falls	0	–	5	–	0	0	–	5	–	0
+ – Conference co-champions; South Dakota Mines and Spearfish played twice. The second game was not counted in the conference standings.

1923 Southern California Conference football standings
	Conf.					Overall
Team	W		L		T	W		L		T
Pomona +	4	–	1	–	0	5	–	2	–	0
Caltech +	4	–	1	–	0	5	–	4	–	0
Occidental	3	–	2	–	0	4	–	3	–	0
Whittier	2	–	3	–	0	4	–	3	–	0
Redlands	2	–	3	–	0	4	–	5	–	1
Southern Branch	0	–	5	–	0	2	–	5	–	0
+ – Conference co-champions

1923 Southern Intercollegiate Athletic Association football standings
	Conf.					Overall
Team	W		L		T	W		L		T
Furman $	4	–	1	–	0	9	–	2	–	0
Centre	2	–	0	–	0	7	–	1	–	1
Vanderbilt*	2	–	0	–	0	5	–	2	–	1
Western Kentucky	2	–	0	–	0	3	–	4	–	0
Mississippi College	3	–	0	–	1	5	–	1	–	2
The Citadel	2	–	1	–	1	5	–	3	–	1
Presbyterian	2	–	1	–	1	4	–	3	–	1
Louisville	2	–	1	–	0	5	–	2	–	0
Sewanee	3	–	2	–	0	5	–	4	–	1
Oglethorpe	3	–	3	–	0	4	–	6	–	0
Chattanooga	1	–	3	–	1	3	–	4	–	2
Howard (AL)	1	–	3	–	1	3	–	4	–	3
Wofford	1	–	3	–	0	6	–	3	–	0
Mercer	2	–	2	–	0	4	–	5	–	0
Millsaps	0	–	1	–	1	0	–	1	–	1
Louisiana College	0	–	1	–	0	0	–	1	–	0
Georgetown (KY)	0	–	1	–	0	0	–	3	–	0
Transylvania	0	–	3	–	0	0	–	3	–	0
Newberry	0	–	4	–	0	2	–	8	–	0
$ – Conference champion; * – co-member of SoCon

1923 Southwestern Athletic Conference football standings
	Conf.					Overall
Team	W		L		T	W		L		T
Wiley $	4	–	1	–	0	6	–	1	–	0
Paul Quinn	3	–	1	–	1	5	–	1	–	1
Prairie View	3	–	2	–	0	5	–	2	–	0
Texas College	1	–	3	–	1	?	–	?	–	?
Bishop	1	–	3	–	0	2	–	4	–	2
Samuel Huston	0	–	2	–	2	?	–	?	–	?
$ – Conference champion

1923 Spokane Intercollegiate Conference football standings
	Conf.					Overall
Team	W		L		T	W		L		T
Cheney Normal $	3	–	0	–	0	5	–	2	–	0
Spokane College	2	–	1	–	0	?	–	?	–	?
Whitworth	1	–	2	–	0	?	–	?	–	?
Spokane University	0	–	3	–	0	?	–	?	–	?
$ – Conference champion

1923 Texas Intercollegiate Athletic Association football standings
	Conf.					Overall
Team	W		L		T	W		L		T
Austin $	4	–	0	–	1	7	–	2	–	1
Howard Payne	3	–	1	–	2	4	–	3	–	2
Simmons (TX)	2	–	1	–	2	3	–	5	–	2
Rice	2	–	1	–	0	3	–	5	–	0
Southwestern (TX)	2	–	1	–	1	2	–	5	–	1
North Texas State Teachers	3	–	2	–	0	3	–	5	–	0
Trinity (TX)	3	–	3	–	0	6	–	3	–	0
Sam Houston State	3	–	3	–	0	4	–	4	–	0
Southwest Texas State	3	–	4	–	0	4	–	4	–	0
West Texas State	1	–	3	–	0	4	–	4	–	1
East Texas State	1	–	4	–	0	2	–	6	–	0
Daniel Baker	1	–	5	–	0	1	–	6	–	0
$ – Conference champion

1923 Tri-Normal Conference football standings
	Conf.					Overall
Team	W		L		T	W		L		T
Bellingham Normal $	2	–	0	–	0	3	–	0	–	2
Cheney Normal	1	–	1	–	0	5	–	2	–	0
Ellensburg Normal	0	–	2	–	0	0	–	3	–	0
$ – Conference champion

1923 Wisconsin Normal Athletic Conference football standings
	Conf.					Overall
Team	W		L		T	W		L		T
Oshkosh Normal $	5	–	0	–	0	7	–	0	–	0
La Crosse Normal	1	–	0	–	1	5	–	1	–	1
River Falls Normal	3	–	1	–	0	5	–	2	–	0
Whitewater Normal	2	–	1	–	0	6	–	1	–	0
Eau Claire Normal	2	–	1	–	0	4	–	2	–	0
Superior Normal	2	–	2	–	0	5	–	4	–	0
Platteville Normal	1	–	3	–	0	2	–	6	–	1
Milwaukee Normal	0	–	2	–	1	2	–	4	–	1
Stout Normal	0	–	2	–	1	1	–	5	–	1
Stevens Point Normal	0	–	4	–	1	0	–	6	–	1
$ – Conference champion

== Awards and honors ==
=== All-Americans ===
The consensus All-America team included:

Position	Name	Height	Weight (lbs.)	Class	Hometown	Team
QB	George Pfann	5'9"	172	Sr.	Marion, Ohio	Cornell
HB	Red Grange	5'11"	175	So.	Wheaton, Illinois	Illinois
HB	Harry Wilson	5'9"	170	Sr.	Sharon, Pennsylvania	Penn State
FB	Bill Mallory	5'10"	175	Sr.		Yale
E	Lynn Bomar	6'1"	205	Jr.	Bell Buckle, Tennessee	Vanderbilt
E	Pete MacRae		180	Sr.	Pittsburgh, Pennsylvania	Syracuse
T	Century Milstead	6'4"	205	Sr.	Rock Island, Illinois	Yale
G	Charles Hubbard			Sr.		Harvard
C	Jack Blott	6'0"	210	Sr.	Girard, Ohio	Michigan
G	Jim McMillen	6'1"	215	Sr.	Grayslake, Illinois	Illinois
T	Marty Below	6'2"	190	Sr.	Oshkosh, Wisconsin	Wisconsin
E	Ray Eklund			Sr.		Minnesota

== Statistical leaders ==
- Player scoring most points: George Pfann, Cornell, 98
