= Russwood Park =

Former baseball stadium in Memphis, Tennessee

Coordinates: 35.140766°N 90.030084°W

Russwood Park was a stadium in Memphis, Tennessee. It was primarily used for baseball and was the home of the Memphis Chicks, the Memphis Red Sox of the Negro American League, and the Memphis Red Sox minor league baseball team until the spring of 1960. The ballpark was originally built in 1896 and was known as Elm Wood Park or Red Elm Park. In 1915, team owner Russell E. Garner incorporated his name into the ballpark's name. The "wood" part of the name would figure into its demise.

Before its dramatic end, the ballpark was best known for being among the more uniquely shaped ballfields in the country. As with Nashville's Sulphur Dell, it was in a natural "bowl". The slopes were used as convenient foundations for seating areas. Constrained by its topography, a creek, and pre-existing buildings, the park was on an asymmetrical lot, with the deepest parts of left and right fields being significantly farther from home plate than the straightaway center.

City directories gave its street address as 914 Madison Avenue. Its boundary streets included Madison (south, home plate), Dunlap Street (west, left field), and Jefferson Avenue beyond bordering buildings (north, center field). The creek (later covered to make a parking lot) ran outside the right field fence. The outfield dimensions following the 1921 remodeling were: left field 424 feet (129.2 m); center field 366 feet (111.6 m); and right field 301 feet (91.7 m), quickly angling out to a very deep right-center, about 425 feet (129.5 m). The left field distance was shortened somewhat by constructing an inner fence and bleachers. During construction of the foundations for a new stand on December 19, 1921, an unsupported trench caved in, resulting in injuries to six laborers and the death of 25-year-old Dace Smith.

It was also the home field for the Memphis Tigers football team from 1912 to 1928, known as the West Tennessee State Normal School and the West Tennessee State Teachers College.

One of its better-known non-baseball events was a concert by Memphis' adoptive son Elvis Presley on July 4, 1956. Coincidentally, 21 years later, Elvis would be pronounced dead at the Baptist Hospital across Madison Avenue to the south.

The largest crowd attendance for wrestling in Memphis was set on August 17, 1959, at Russwood Park. The main event was Billy Wicks and Sputnik Monroe fighting in a no-contest for Monroe's Tennessee Championship. Attendance for the event has been reported to be between 17,000 and 18,000. The record would stand until the Monday Night Wars Era.

The final event at the old ballpark was a pre-season exhibition game between the Chicago White Sox and the Cleveland Indians on Easter Sunday, April 17, 1960. A reported 7,279 fans watched the Indians beat the White Sox 2-1.

The ballpark was a relic constructed primarily of wood except for steel supports for the roof. A fire of undetermined origin destroyed the ballpark that night after the game. The blaze threatened the Baptist Hospital across the street from it, and patients had to be evacuated.

The Chicks played in several temporary facilities for the 1960 season, including a cramped high school football field a couple of blocks northeast of the ballpark site called Hodges Field, and then a city-owned field called Tobey Park. After the season, the club moved to Macon, Georgia. As it happens, the entire Southern Association disbanded after the 1961 season. A revived minor league entry for the city, called the Memphis Blues, began play in 1968 at Tim McCarver Stadium.

== Sources ==
- Baseball Parks of North America by Michael Benson, 1989.
