= 1926 Western Maryland Green Terror football team =

American college football season

1926 Western Maryland Green Terror football
- Conference: Independent
- Record: 6–1
- Head coach: Dick Harlow (1st season)
- Captain: Frank Sillin

1926 Southern college football independents records
	Conf.			Overall
Team	W	L	T	W		L		T
Loyola (LA)		–		10	–	0	–	0
Miami (FL)		–		8	–	0	–	0
Howard		–		7	–	0	–	0
Delaware State		–		1	–	0	–	0
No. 2 Navy		–		9	–	0	–	1
Wesley		–		6	–	1	–	0
Texas Tech		–		6	–	1	–	3
Davidson		–		7	–	2	–	1
Georgetown		–		7	–	2	–	1
William & Mary		–		7	–	3	–	0
Georgia Normal		–		5	–	3	–	1
Hampden–Sydney		–		5	–	2	–	3
George Washington		–		5	–	4	–	0
Middle Tennessee State Teachers		–		4	–	2	–	1
Spring Hill		–		3	–	2	–	1
Texas A&I		–		4	–	3	–	0
Wake Forest		–		5	–	4	–	1
Texas Mines		–		3	–	4	–	0
Mississippi State Teachers		–		3	–	4	–	1
Tennessee Docs		–		3	–	5	–	1
Catholic University		–		3	–	5	–	0
Delaware		–		3	–	5	–	0
East Tennessee State Teachers		–		2	–	4	–	1
Duke		–		3	–	6	–	0
Richmond		–		2	–	7	–	0
Harding		–		1	–	5	–	0
West Tennessee State Teachers		–		1	–	8	–	0
Rankings from Dickinson System

The 1926 Western Maryland Green Terror football team was an American football team that represented Western Maryland College (now known as McDaniel College) as an independent during the 1926 college football season. In its first season under head coach Dick Harlow, the team compiled a 6–1 record and shut out four of its seven opponents. Frank Sillin was the team's captain.

Harlow was hired as Western Maryland's head football coach in December 1925. He had previously coached at Penn State and Colgate. He served nine years as Western Maryland's head coach. During those years, the school's football team compiled a 60–13–7 record. Harlow was later inducted into the College Football Hall of Fame.

The team played no home games on the school's campus in Westminster, Maryland.

== Schedule ==
Date	Opponent	Site	Result	Attendance	Source
September 26	at Gettysburg	Memorial Field; Gettysburg, PA	W 12–3	3,000	
October 2	at Dickinson	Carlisle, PA	W 13–0		
October 16	at Swarthmore		W 34–7		
October 23	at Holy Cross	Fitton Field; Worcester, MA	L 14–20		
November 6	at Washington College	Chestertown, MD	W 60–0		
November 13	vs. Loyola (MD)	Baltimore Stadium; Baltimore, MD	W 33–0	8,000-12,000	
November 20	at Bucknell	Lewisburg, PA	W 40–0		
