= 1926 Holy Cross Crusaders football team =

American college football season

1926 Holy Cross Crusaders football
- Conference: Independent
- Record: 7–1–2
- Head coach: Cleo A. O'Donnell (8th season)
- Home stadium: Fitton Field

1926 Eastern college football independents records
	Conf.			Overall
Team	W	L	T	W		L		T
No. 5 Lafayette		–		9	–	0	–	0
No. 10 Brown		–		9	–	0	–	1
NYU		–		8	–	1	–	0
No. 9 Army		–		7	–	1	–	1
Washington & Jefferson		–		7	–	1	–	1
Boston College		–		6	–	0	–	2
No. 10 Penn		–		7	–	1	–	1
Cornell		–		6	–	1	–	1
Princeton		–		5	–	1	–	1
Carnegie Tech		–		7	–	2	–	0
Springfield		–		6	–	2	–	0
Syracuse		–		7	–	2	–	1
Villanova		–		6	–	2	–	1
Colgate		–		5	–	2	–	2
Columbia		–		6	–	3	–	0
Pittsburgh		–		5	–	2	–	2
CCNY		–		5	–	3	–	0
Temple		–		5	–	3	–	0
Penn State		–		5	–	4	–	0
Tufts		–		4	–	4	–	0
Yale		–		4	–	4	–	0
Bucknell		–		4	–	5	–	1
Fordham		–		3	–	4	–	1
Harvard		–		3	–	5	–	0
Rutgers		–		3	–	6	–	0
Vermont		–		3	–	6	–	0
Drexel		–		2	–	5	–	0
Boston University		–		2	–	6	–	0
Lehigh		–		1	–	8	–	0
Franklin & Marshall		–		0	–	8	–	1
Rankings from Dickinson System

The 1926 Holy Cross Crusaders football team was an American football team that represented the College of the Holy Cross as an independent during the 1926 college football season. In its eighth season under head coach Cleo A. O'Donnell, the team compiled a 7–1–2 record. The team played its home games at Fitton Field in Worcester, Massachusetts.

== Schedule ==
Date	Opponent	Site	Result	Attendance	Source
September 25	Newport Naval	Fitton Field; Worcester, MA	W 34–0		
October 2	St. John's	Fitton Field; Worcester, MA	W 45–0		
October 9	at Harvard	Harvard Stadium; Boston, MA	W 19–14		
October 16	at Rutgers	Neilson Field; New Brunswick, NJ	W 21–0		
October 23	Western Maryland	Fitton Field; Worcester, MA	W 20–14		
October 30	Dayton	Fitton Field; Worcester, MA	W 20–7		
November 6	Fordham	Fitton Field; Worcester, MA	T 7–7		
November 13	Catholic University	Fitton Field; Worcester, MA	W 14–6		
November 20	Boston University	Fitton Field; Worcester, MA	L 0–3		
November 27	at Boston College	Braves Field; Boston, MA	T 0–0	40,000	
