= George B. Powell =

American football and basketball coach (1900–1967)

Biographical details
- Born: October 2, 1900; Smithville, Texas, U.S.
- Died: May 10, 1967 (aged 66); Smithville, Texas, U.S.

Playing career

Football
- 1919–1920: Rice

Basketball
- c. 1920: Rice

Track
- c. 1920: Rice
- Position: hurdles (track)

Coaching career (HC unless noted)

Football
- 1924–1926: Texas Mines

Basketball
- 1924–1926: Texas Mines

Head coaching record
- Overall: 11–7–2 (football); 6–13 (basketball)

George Blanton Powell (October 2, 1900 – May 10, 1967), sometimes referred to as Chuck Powell, was an American football and basketball coach. He served as the head football coach at the Texas School of Mines—now known as the University of Texas at El Paso (UTEP)—from 1924 to 1926, compiling a record of 11–7–2. Powell was also the head basketball coach at Texas Mines from 1924 to 1926, tallying a mark of 6–13.

== Early years ==
Powell was born in Smithville, Texas, in 1900. He attended Rice Institute where he played football and basketball and ran hurdles for the track team.

== Texas Mines ==
In August 1924, he was hired by the Texas School of Mines as its physical director, coach of the school's athletic teams, and instructor in the department of engineering.

In the fall of 1924, Powell won plaudits for eliminating the football team's financial deficit for the first time in school history. In June 1925, he was reelected to serve a second year as Texas Mines' football coach. Powell planned to attend Knute Rockne's coaching school later in the summer.

He led the 1925 Texas Mines Miners football team to a 5–1–1 record, including victories over New Mexico, New Mexico A&M, and Arizona State. The team's record was the best in school history to that point; only three prior Texas Mines teams had compiled a winning record, and those three teams had exceeded a .500 record by only a single game.

Powell's 1926 Texas Mines football team compiled a 3–4 record. At the end of the 1926 season, he resigned his position and returned to his home in Smithville. He left the school for more lucrative employment in Smithville.

== Family and later years ==
Powell was married in June 1925 to Anna M. Doak of El Paso. After leaving El Paso, he lived the rest of his life in Smithville and worked as a farmer.

He died in 1967 at Scott and White Memorial Hospital in Temple, Texas. The cause of death was respiratory failure due to carcinoma of the lung.

== Head coaching record ==
=== Football ===
Year	Team	Overall	Conference	Standing	Bowl/playoffs
Texas Mines Miners (Independent) (1924–1926)
1924	Texas Mines	3–2–1			
1925	Texas Mines	5–1–1			
1926	Texas Mines	3–4			
Texas Mines:		11–7–2			
Total:		11–7–2			
