= 1926 Fordham Maroon football team =

American college football season

1926 Fordham Maroon football
- Conference: Independent
- Record: 3–4–1
- Head coach: Frank Gargan (7th season)
- Captain: Thomas Leary
- Home stadium: Fordham Field

1926 Eastern college football independents records
| | Conf. | | | Overall |
| Team | W | L | T | W | | L | | T |
|---|---|---|---|---|---|---|---|---|
| No. 5 Lafayette | | – | | 9 | – | 0 | – | 0 |
| No. 10 Brown | | – | | 9 | – | 0 | – | 1 |
| NYU | | – | | 8 | – | 1 | – | 0 |
| No. 9 Army | | – | | 7 | – | 1 | – | 1 |
| Washington & Jefferson | | – | | 7 | – | 1 | – | 1 |
| Boston College | | – | | 6 | – | 0 | – | 2 |
| No. 10 Penn | | – | | 7 | – | 1 | – | 1 |
| Cornell | | – | | 6 | – | 1 | – | 1 |
| Princeton | | – | | 5 | – | 1 | – | 1 |
| Carnegie Tech | | – | | 7 | – | 2 | – | 0 |
| Springfield | | – | | 6 | – | 2 | – | 0 |
| Syracuse | | – | | 7 | – | 2 | – | 1 |
| Villanova | | – | | 6 | – | 2 | – | 1 |
| Colgate | | – | | 5 | – | 2 | – | 2 |
| Columbia | | – | | 6 | – | 3 | – | 0 |
| Pittsburgh | | – | | 5 | – | 2 | – | 2 |
| CCNY | | – | | 5 | – | 3 | – | 0 |
| Temple | | – | | 5 | – | 3 | – | 0 |
| Penn State | | – | | 5 | – | 4 | – | 0 |
| Tufts | | – | | 4 | – | 4 | – | 0 |
| Yale | | – | | 4 | – | 4 | – | 0 |
| Bucknell | | – | | 4 | – | 5 | – | 1 |
| Fordham | | – | | 3 | – | 4 | – | 1 |
| Harvard | | – | | 3 | – | 5 | – | 0 |
| Rutgers | | – | | 3 | – | 6 | – | 0 |
| Vermont | | – | | 3 | – | 6 | – | 0 |
| Drexel | | – | | 2 | – | 5 | – | 0 |
| Boston University | | – | | 2 | – | 6 | – | 0 |
| Lehigh | | – | | 1 | – | 8 | – | 0 |
| Franklin & Marshall | | – | | 0 | – | 8 | – | 1 |
Rankings from Dickinson System

The 1926 Fordham Maroon football team was an American football team that represented Fordham University as an independent during the 1926 college football season. In its seventh and final year under head coach Frank Gargan, Fordham compiled a 3–4–1 record and outscored opponents by a total of 131 to 119.

== Schedule ==
| Date | Opponent | Site | Result | Attendance | Source |
|---|---|---|---|---|---|
| October 2 | Mount St. Mary's | Fordham Field; Bronx, NY | W 48–0 | | |
| October 9 | Manhattan | Fordham Field; Bronx, NY | W 41–0 | | |
| October 12 | at Boston College | Braves Field; Boston, MA | L 0–27 | 20,000 | |
| October 23 | Washington & Jefferson | Polo Grounds; New York, NY | L 13–28 | 8,000 | |
| October 30 | vs. NYU | Yankee Stadium; Bronx, NY | L 3–27 | 25,000 | |
| November 6 | at Holy Cross | Fitton Field; Worcester, MA | T 7–7 | | |
| November 13 | at CCNY | Lewisohn Stadium; New York, NY | W 7–3 | | |
| November 20 | Georgetown | Polo Grounds; New York, NY | L 0–39 | 20,000 | |
