= Frank Sillin =

American football player (1903–1932)

- Sillin, c. 1925

No. 14, 18
- Position: Back

Personal information
- Born: May 15, 1903; Wapakoneta, Ohio, U.S.
- Died: December 29, 1932 (aged 29); Montgomery County, Ohio, U.S.
- Listed height: 5 ft 11 in (1.80 m)
- Listed weight: 179 lb (81 kg)

Career information
- High school: Stivers (Dayton, Ohio)
- College: Western Maryland

Career history
- Dayton Triangles (1921, 1927–1929)

Career statistics
- Games: 17

Frank P. Sillin (May 15, 1903 – December 29, 1932) was an American football player. He played college football at Western Maryland College (now known as McDaniel College) as a fullback from 1924 to 1926 and was captain of the school's 1926 team. He later professional football in the National Football League (NFL) as a back for the Dayton Triangles. He appeared in 17 NFL games, 12 as a starter, during the 1921, 1927, 1928, and 1929 seasons. He died in 1932 at age 29 of influenza and pneumonia.
