= 1926 East Tennessee State Teachers football team =

American college football season

1926 East Tennessee State Teachers football
- Conference: Independent
- Record: 2–4–1
- Head coach: John Robinson (2nd season)
- Captain: Shelby Clark

1926 Southern college football independents records
	Conf.			Overall
Team	W	L	T	W		L		T
Loyola (LA)		–		10	–	0	–	0
Miami (FL)		–		8	–	0	–	0
Howard		–		7	–	0	–	0
Delaware State		–		1	–	0	–	0
No. 2 Navy		–		9	–	0	–	1
Wesley		–		6	–	1	–	0
Texas Tech		–		6	–	1	–	3
Davidson		–		7	–	2	–	1
Georgetown		–		7	–	2	–	1
William & Mary		–		7	–	3	–	0
Georgia Normal		–		5	–	3	–	1
Hampden–Sydney		–		5	–	2	–	3
George Washington		–		5	–	4	–	0
Middle Tennessee State Teachers		–		4	–	2	–	1
Spring Hill		–		3	–	2	–	1
Texas A&I		–		4	–	3	–	0
Wake Forest		–		5	–	4	–	1
Texas Mines		–		3	–	4	–	0
Mississippi State Teachers		–		3	–	4	–	1
Tennessee Docs		–		3	–	5	–	1
Catholic University		–		3	–	5	–	0
Delaware		–		3	–	5	–	0
East Tennessee State Teachers		–		2	–	4	–	1
Duke		–		3	–	6	–	0
Richmond		–		2	–	7	–	0
Harding		–		1	–	5	–	0
West Tennessee State Teachers		–		1	–	8	–	0
Rankings from Dickinson System

The 1926 East Tennessee State Teachers football team was an American football team that represented East Tennessee State Teacher's College—now known as East Tennessee State University (ETSU)—as an independent in the 1926 college football season. They were led by second-year coach John Robinson. Robinson gained a new assistant coach in William "Willie" Flinn Rogers, who taught history and government at the school from 1925 to 1968. Shelby Clark was the team captain. The Teachers finished with a record of 2–4–1.

== Schedule ==
Date	Time	Opponent	Site	Result	Source
October 9		at Emory and Henry	Emory, VA	L 0–14	
October 23		at Carson–Newman	Jefferson City, TN	L 0–74	
October 30		at Mars Hill	Mars Hill, NC	T 0–0	
November 6		Lincoln Memorial	Johnson City, TN	W 12–7	
		at Eastern Kentucky	Richmond, KY	L 6–41	
November 19		Hiwassee	Johnson City, TN	W 28–3	
November 27	2:45 p.m.	Tusculum	Johnson City, TN	L 0–19	
All times are in Eastern time
