= 1926 Tennessee Docs football team =

American college football season

1926 Tennessee Docs football
- Conference: Independent
- Record: 3–5–1
- Head coach: Gil Reese (1st season)
- Home stadium: Hodges Field

1926 Southern college football independents records
	Conf.			Overall
Team	W	L	T	W		L		T
Loyola (LA)		–		10	–	0	–	0
Miami (FL)		–		8	–	0	–	0
Howard		–		7	–	0	–	0
Delaware State		–		1	–	0	–	0
No. 2 Navy		–		9	–	0	–	1
Wesley		–		6	–	1	–	0
Texas Tech		–		6	–	1	–	3
Davidson		–		7	–	2	–	1
Georgetown		–		7	–	2	–	1
William & Mary		–		7	–	3	–	0
Georgia Normal		–		5	–	3	–	1
Hampden–Sydney		–		5	–	2	–	3
George Washington		–		5	–	4	–	0
Middle Tennessee State Teachers		–		4	–	2	–	1
Spring Hill		–		3	–	2	–	1
Texas A&I		–		4	–	3	–	0
Wake Forest		–		5	–	4	–	1
Texas Mines		–		3	–	4	–	0
Mississippi State Teachers		–		3	–	4	–	1
Tennessee Docs		–		3	–	5	–	1
Catholic University		–		3	–	5	–	0
Delaware		–		3	–	5	–	0
East Tennessee State Teachers		–		2	–	4	–	1
Duke		–		3	–	6	–	0
Richmond		–		2	–	7	–	0
Harding		–		1	–	5	–	0
West Tennessee State Teachers		–		1	–	8	–	0
Rankings from Dickinson System

The 1926 Tennessee Docs football team (variously "Docs", "UT Doctors" or the "Tennessee Medicos") represented the University of Tennessee College of Medicine in Memphis in the 1926 college football season. It was their last season of play. The final game saw Vanderbilt teammates Gil Reese and Jess Neely coach against one another.

== Schedule ==
Date	Time	Opponent	Site	Result	Attendance	Source
October 2	2:30 p.m.	West Tennessee State Teachers	Hodges Field; Memphis, TN	W 21–0	1,000	
October 9		at Loyola (LA)	Loyola University Stadium; New Orleans, LA	L 6–14		
October 16		Bethel (TN)	Hodges Field; Memphis, TN	W 31–6		
October 23	2:30 p.m.	at Louisiana Tech	Louisiana Tech Field; Ruston, LA	T 0–0		
October 30		Union (TN)	Hodges Field; Memphis, TN	W 7–0		
November 11		Ouachita Baptist	Hodges Field; Memphis, TN	L 0–37		
November 20		Cumberland (TN)	Hodges Field; Memphis, TN	L 0–12		
November 25		Southwestern (TN)	Hodges Field; Memphis, TN	L 0–6	4,550	
November 27		at Little Rock	Little Rock, AR	L 0–32		
All times are in Central time
