= 1926 Navy Midshipmen football team =

American college football season

1926 Navy Midshipmen football
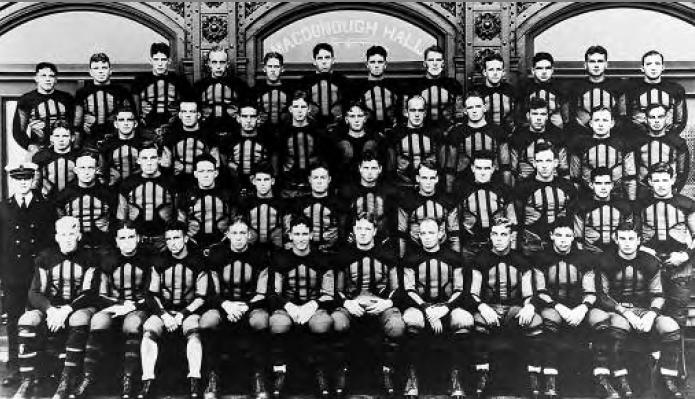

National champion (Boand, Houlgate)
- Conference: Independent
- Record: 9–0–1
- Head coach: Bill Ingram (1st season)
- Captain: Frank Wickhorst
- Home stadium: Thompson Stadium

1926 Southern college football independents records
	Conf.			Overall
Team	W	L	T	W		L		T
Loyola (LA)		–		10	–	0	–	0
Miami (FL)		–		8	–	0	–	0
Howard		–		7	–	0	–	0
Delaware State		–		1	–	0	–	0
No. 2 Navy		–		9	–	0	–	1
Wesley		–		6	–	1	–	0
Texas Tech		–		6	–	1	–	3
Davidson		–		7	–	2	–	1
Georgetown		–		7	–	2	–	1
William & Mary		–		7	–	3	–	0
Georgia Normal		–		5	–	3	–	1
Hampden–Sydney		–		5	–	2	–	3
George Washington		–		5	–	4	–	0
Middle Tennessee State Teachers		–		4	–	2	–	1
Spring Hill		–		3	–	2	–	1
Texas A&I		–		4	–	3	–	0
Wake Forest		–		5	–	4	–	1
Texas Mines		–		3	–	4	–	0
Mississippi State Teachers		–		3	–	4	–	1
Tennessee Docs		–		3	–	5	–	1
Catholic University		–		3	–	5	–	0
Delaware		–		3	–	5	–	0
East Tennessee State Teachers		–		2	–	4	–	1
Duke		–		3	–	6	–	0
Richmond		–		2	–	7	–	0
Harding		–		1	–	5	–	0
West Tennessee State Teachers		–		1	–	8	–	0
Rankings from Dickinson System

The 1926 Navy Midshipmen football team represented the United States Naval Academy in the 1926 college football season. The Midshipmen were coached by Bill Ingram in his first year and finished the season undefeated with a record of nine wins, zero losses and one tie (9–0–1). Although Alabama and Stanford have been named the 1926 national champion by most selectors, the 1926 Navy team was retroactively named as the national champion under Boand and Houlgate Systems. The team was ranked No. 2 in the nation in the Dickinson System ratings released in December 1926.

== Schedule ==
Date	Opponent	Site	Result	Attendance	Source
October 2	Purdue	Thompson Stadium; Annapolis, MD	W 17–13		
October 9	Drake	Thompson Stadium; Annapolis, MD	W 24–7		
October 9	Richmond	Thompson Stadium; Annapolis, MD	W 26–0		
October 16	at Princeton	Palmer Stadium; Princeton, NJ	W 27–13		
October 23	Colgate	Thompson Stadium; Annapolis, MD	W 13–7	15,000	
October 30	Michigan	Municipal Stadium; Baltimore, MD	W 10–0	80,000	
November 6	West Virginia Wesleyan	Thompson Stadium; Annapolis, MD	W 53–7		
November 13	Georgetown	Thompson Stadium; Annapolis, MD	W 10–7		
November 20	Loyola (MD)	Thompson Stadium; Annapolis, MD	W 35–13		
November 27	vs. Army	Soldier Field; Chicago, IL (Army–Navy Game)	T 21–21		

== Roster ==
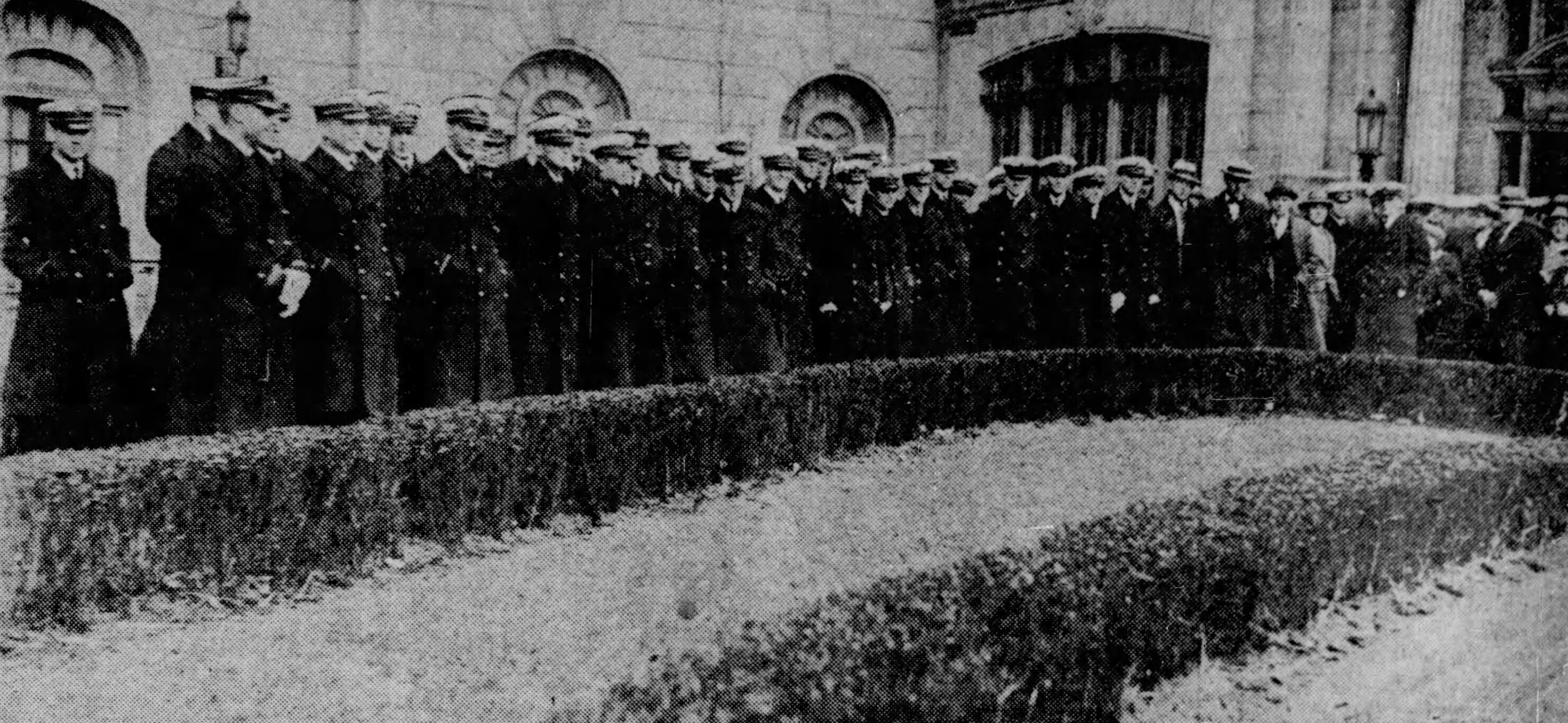
Players at the Hotel Windemere in Chicago ahead of the Army–Navy Game

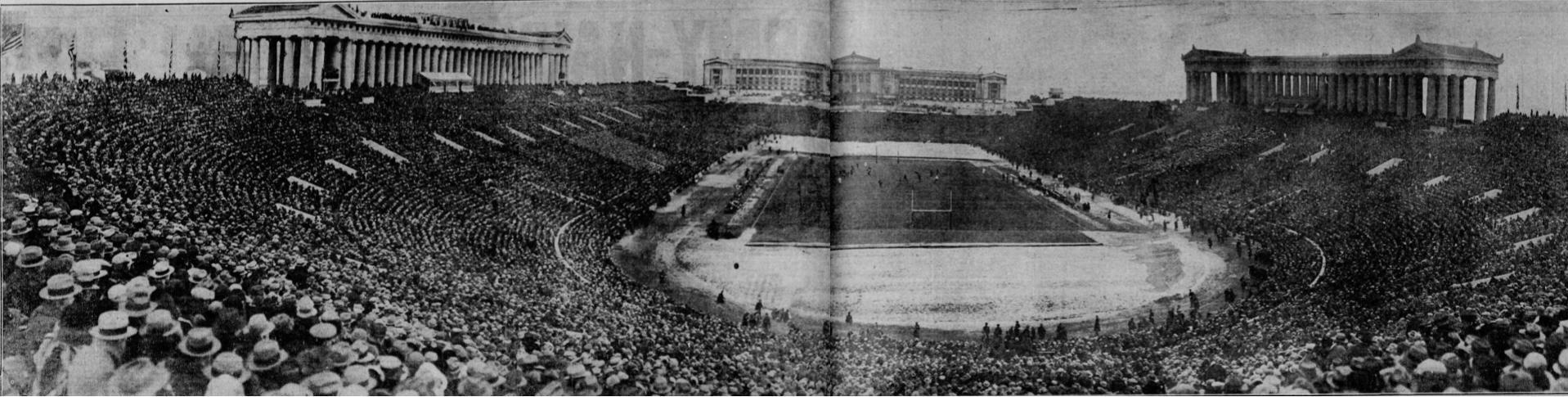
1926 Army–Navy Game at Soldier Field in Chicago

1926 Navy Midshipmen football team roster
Players
Coaches
Offense

Pos.	#	Name	Class
B	10	J. A. Lucier
B	11	F. R. Hubert–Jones
B	12	H. R. Nieman
B	14	William J. Millican
B	15	Howard Caldwell	Sr
B	16	E. M. Condra
OT	17	C. F. Stillman
B	18	Maurice E. Goudge	Sr
E	19	J. Marginnis
G	20	Edward Burke	So
G	21	C. J. Zondorak
G	22	Wilson T. Dodge	Jr
E	23	Francis S. Smith	So
QB	25	Edward A. Hannegan	Jr
B	26	Jim Schuber	Jr
B	27	Howard F. Ransford	Jr
B	28	D. E. O'Neil
C	29	Herbert L. Hoerner	Sr
E	30	Delbert Fred Williamson	Sr
G	32	Francis R. Duborg	So
B	33	Tom Hamilton	Sr
E	34	W. T. McGarry
B	35	Alan Shapley	Sr
B	37	Elliott W. Parish Jr.	So
E	38	W. Allen Taylor	Jr
E	40	Hank Hardwick	Jr
G	41	John H. Cross	Sr
G	43	Arthur S. Born	Sr
G	44	C. H. DuBerg
OT	45	Alfred R. Truslow Jr.	Sr
G	46	H. H. Brockman
C	47	H.L. Warren	Sr
OT	49	Daniel Thomas Eddy	Sr
G	50	A. M. Aichel
E	51	Whitey Lloyd	Fr
B	52	L. T. Morse
C	53	Wendell G. Osborne
G	54	R. A. Pierce	Jr
OT	55	E. Olsen
E	56	Michael Peter Bagdanovich	Jr
OT	57	Frank Wickhorst (c)	Sr
OT	58	B. L. Woerner
OT	59	Thomas R. Wilson	So
B	—	R. V. Hull
OT	—	Carl Emil Giese	So

Defense

Pos.	#	Name	Class

Special teams

Pos.	#	Name	Class

Head coach

Coordinators/assistant coaches

Legend

- (C) Team captain
- (S) Suspended
- (I) Ineligible
- Injured
- Redshirt

Roster
