= 1926 Texas Tech Matadors football team =

American college football season

1926 Texas Tech Matadors football
- 1926 Texas Tech football team
- Conference: Independent
- Record: 6–1–3
- Head coach: Ewing Y. Freeland (2nd season)
- Offensive scheme: T formation
- Base defense: 7–2–2
- Captains: Hurley Carpenter; Volney Hill
- Home stadium: South Plains Fairgrounds; Tech Field

1926 Southern college football independents records
| | Conf. | | | Overall |
| Team | W | L | T | W | | L | | T |
|---|---|---|---|---|---|---|---|---|
| Loyola (LA) | | – | | 10 | – | 0 | – | 0 |
| Miami (FL) | | – | | 8 | – | 0 | – | 0 |
| Howard | | – | | 7 | – | 0 | – | 0 |
| Delaware State | | – | | 1 | – | 0 | – | 0 |
| No. 2 Navy | | – | | 9 | – | 0 | – | 1 |
| Wesley | | – | | 6 | – | 1 | – | 0 |
| Texas Tech | | – | | 6 | – | 1 | – | 3 |
| Davidson | | – | | 7 | – | 2 | – | 1 |
| Georgetown | | – | | 7 | – | 2 | – | 1 |
| William & Mary | | – | | 7 | – | 3 | – | 0 |
| Georgia Normal | | – | | 5 | – | 3 | – | 1 |
| Hampden–Sydney | | – | | 5 | – | 2 | – | 3 |
| George Washington | | – | | 5 | – | 4 | – | 0 |
| Middle Tennessee State Teachers | | – | | 4 | – | 2 | – | 1 |
| Spring Hill | | – | | 3 | – | 2 | – | 1 |
| Texas A&I | | – | | 4 | – | 3 | – | 0 |
| Wake Forest | | – | | 5 | – | 4 | – | 1 |
| Texas Mines | | – | | 3 | – | 4 | – | 0 |
| Mississippi State Teachers | | – | | 3 | – | 4 | – | 1 |
| Tennessee Docs | | – | | 3 | – | 5 | – | 1 |
| Catholic University | | – | | 3 | – | 5 | – | 0 |
| Delaware | | – | | 3 | – | 5 | – | 0 |
| East Tennessee State Teachers | | – | | 2 | – | 4 | – | 1 |
| Duke | | – | | 3 | – | 6 | – | 0 |
| Richmond | | – | | 2 | – | 7 | – | 0 |
| Harding | | – | | 1 | – | 5 | – | 0 |
| West Tennessee State Teachers | | – | | 1 | – | 8 | – | 0 |
Rankings from Dickinson System

The 1926 Texas Tech Matadors football team represented Texas Technological College—now known as Texas Tech University—as an independent in the 1926 college football season. Led by second year head coach Ewing Y. Freeland, the Matadors compiled a record of 6–1–3 The season marked the first time that Texas Tech played the TCU Horned Frogs.

== Schedule ==
| Date | Opponent | Site | Result | Attendance | Source |
|---|---|---|---|---|---|
| September 21 | at McMurry | Fair Park; Abilene, TX | W 7–0 | | |
| October 2 | Schreiner | South Plains Fairgrounds; Lubbock, TX | T 0–0 | 3,500 | |
| October 8 | St. Edward's | Tech Field; Lubbock, TX | W 7–6 | 3,500 | |
| October 15 | at Simmons (TX) | Parramore Field; Abilene, TX | T 0–0 | 3,000 | |
| October 23 | Clarendon | Tech Field; Lubbock, TX | W 14–0 | | |
| October 30 | at TCU | Clark Field; Fort Worth, TX (rivalry) | L 16–28 | 5,000 | |
| November 5 | at Daniel Baker | Brownwood, TX | T 0–0 | | |
| November 11 | Abilene Christian | Tech Field; Lubbock, TX | W 29–6 | 3,000 | |
| November 18 | Howard Payne | Tech Field; Lubbock, TX | W 26–6 | 3,500 | |
| November 25 | at West Texas State | Buffalo Stadium; Canyon, TX | W 7–2 | 5,000 | |

== Notes ==
1. 1927 La Ventana yearbook lists the score of this game as 28–7.
2. 1927 La Ventana yearbook lists the score of this game as 27–6.
