= 1926 George Washington Hatchetites football team =

American college football season

1926 George Washington Hatchetites football
- Conference: Independent
- Record: 5–4
- Head coach: Harry W. Crum (3rd season)

1926 Southern college football independents records
	Conf.			Overall
Team	W	L	T	W		L		T
Loyola (LA)		–		10	–	0	–	0
Miami (FL)		–		8	–	0	–	0
Howard		–		7	–	0	–	0
Delaware State		–		1	–	0	–	0
No. 2 Navy		–		9	–	0	–	1
Wesley		–		6	–	1	–	0
Texas Tech		–		6	–	1	–	3
Davidson		–		7	–	2	–	1
Georgetown		–		7	–	2	–	1
William & Mary		–		7	–	3	–	0
Georgia Normal		–		5	–	3	–	1
Hampden–Sydney		–		5	–	2	–	3
George Washington		–		5	–	4	–	0
Middle Tennessee State Teachers		–		4	–	2	–	1
Spring Hill		–		3	–	2	–	1
Texas A&I		–		4	–	3	–	0
Wake Forest		–		5	–	4	–	1
Texas Mines		–		3	–	4	–	0
Mississippi State Teachers		–		3	–	4	–	1
Tennessee Docs		–		3	–	5	–	1
Catholic University		–		3	–	5	–	0
Delaware		–		3	–	5	–	0
East Tennessee State Teachers		–		2	–	4	–	1
Duke		–		3	–	6	–	0
Richmond		–		2	–	7	–	0
Harding		–		1	–	5	–	0
West Tennessee State Teachers		–		1	–	8	–	0
Rankings from Dickinson System

The 1926 George Washington Hatchetites football team was an American football team that represented George Washington University as an independent during the 1926 college football season. In their third season under head coach Harry W. Crum, the team compiled a 5–4 record.

== Schedule ==
Date	Opponent	Site	Result	Attendance	Source
October 2	CCNY	Wilson Memorial Stadium; Washington, DC	W 10–7	3,000	
October 9	at Bucknell	Memorial Stadium; Lewisburg, PA	L 0–13		
October 13	American	Wilson Memorial Stadium; Washington, DC	W 28–7		
October 16	Blue Ridge College	Wilson Memorial Stadium; Washington, DC	W 39–3	500	
October 23	at William & Mary	Cary Field; Williamsburg, VA	L 0–14		
October 30	at Penn State	New Beaver Field; University Park, PA	L 12–20	3,500	
November 6	Ursinus	Griffith Stadium; Washington, DC	W 6–3	4,000	
November 13	Randolph–Macon	Wilson Memorial Stadium; Washington, DC	W 27–0		
November 25	at Catholic University	Brookland Stadium; Washington, DC	L 9–17	10,000	
