= 1926 Middle Tennessee State Teachers football team =

American college football season

1926 Middle Tennessee State Teachers football
- Conference: Independent
- Record: 4–2–1
- Head coach: Frank Faulkinberry (1st season)
- Captain: J. R. Ralston

1926 Southern college football independents records
	Conf.			Overall
Team	W	L	T	W		L		T
Loyola (LA)		–		10	–	0	–	0
Miami (FL)		–		8	–	0	–	0
Howard		–		7	–	0	–	0
Delaware State		–		1	–	0	–	0
No. 2 Navy		–		9	–	0	–	1
Wesley		–		6	–	1	–	0
Texas Tech		–		6	–	1	–	3
Davidson		–		7	–	2	–	1
Georgetown		–		7	–	2	–	1
William & Mary		–		7	–	3	–	0
Georgia Normal		–		5	–	3	–	1
Hampden–Sydney		–		5	–	2	–	3
George Washington		–		5	–	4	–	0
Middle Tennessee State Teachers		–		4	–	2	–	1
Spring Hill		–		3	–	2	–	1
Texas A&I		–		4	–	3	–	0
Wake Forest		–		5	–	4	–	1
Texas Mines		–		3	–	4	–	0
Mississippi State Teachers		–		3	–	4	–	1
Tennessee Docs		–		3	–	5	–	1
Catholic University		–		3	–	5	–	0
Delaware		–		3	–	5	–	0
East Tennessee State Teachers		–		2	–	4	–	1
Duke		–		3	–	6	–	0
Richmond		–		2	–	7	–	0
Harding		–		1	–	5	–	0
West Tennessee State Teachers		–		1	–	8	–	0
Rankings from Dickinson System

The 1926 Middle Tennessee State Teachers football team represented the Middle Tennessee State Teachers College (now known as Middle Tennessee State University) during the 1926 college football season. The team captain was J. R. Ralston.

== Schedule ==
Date	Time	Opponent	Site	Result	Source
September 26		at Vanderbilt	Dudley Field; Nashville, TN	L 0–69	
October 2		at Sewanee	McGee Field; Sewanee, TN	L 0–48	
		at Vanderbilt JV	Nashville, TN	W 12–0	
		Ogden	Murfreesboro, TN	W 40–0	
October 20		at Cumberland (TN)	Murfreesboro, TN	W 23–7	
October 22	3:00 p.m.	at West Tennessee State Teachers	Memorial Field; Memphis, TN	W 27–0	
November 6		Murray State	Murfreesboro, TN	T 0–0	
All times are in Central time
