= 1926 Howard Bison football team =

American college football season

1926 Howard Bison football

Black college national champion
- Conference: Independent
- Record: 7–0
- Head coach: Louis L. Watson (2nd season)
- Captain: H. Vernon Smith
- Home stadium: Howard Stadium

1926 Southern college football independents records
	Conf.			Overall
Team	W	L	T	W		L		T
Loyola (LA)		–		10	–	0	–	0
Miami (FL)		–		8	–	0	–	0
Howard		–		7	–	0	–	0
Delaware State		–		1	–	0	–	0
No. 2 Navy		–		9	–	0	–	1
Wesley		–		6	–	1	–	0
Texas Tech		–		6	–	1	–	3
Davidson		–		7	–	2	–	1
Georgetown		–		7	–	2	–	1
William & Mary		–		7	–	3	–	0
Georgia Normal		–		5	–	3	–	1
Hampden–Sydney		–		5	–	2	–	3
George Washington		–		5	–	4	–	0
Middle Tennessee State Teachers		–		4	–	2	–	1
Spring Hill		–		3	–	2	–	1
Texas A&I		–		4	–	3	–	0
Wake Forest		–		5	–	4	–	1
Texas Mines		–		3	–	4	–	0
Mississippi State Teachers		–		3	–	4	–	1
Tennessee Docs		–		3	–	5	–	1
Catholic University		–		3	–	5	–	0
Delaware		–		3	–	5	–	0
East Tennessee State Teachers		–		2	–	4	–	1
Duke		–		3	–	6	–	0
Richmond		–		2	–	7	–	0
Harding		–		1	–	5	–	0
West Tennessee State Teachers		–		1	–	8	–	0
Rankings from Dickinson System

The 1926 Howard Bison football team was an American football team that represented Howard University during the 1926 college football season. In their second year under head coach Louis L. Watson, the Bison compiled a 7–0 record, shut out six of seven opponents, and outscored all opponents by a total of 199 to 6. The team was recognized as the 1926 black college football national champion. The school dedicated its new Howard Stadium at the Thanksgiving Day football game against the Lincoln Lions.

Key players included quarterback Jack Coles, captain and tackle H. Vernon Smith, halfback Edgar Ross, halfback Clarence "Tick" Smith, center Milton "Biff" Martin, and fullback Jack Young.

== Schedule ==
Date	Time	Opponent	Site	Result	Attendance	Source
October 9		Livingstone	Howard Stadium; Washington, DC	W 31–0		
October 16		Morehouse	Howard Stadium; Washington, DC	W 52–0		
October 23		West Virginia Collegiate	Howard Stadium; Washington, DC	W 14–6		
October 30		Fisk	Howard Stadium; Washington, DC	W 56–0		
November 6		at Wilberforce	Wilberforce, OH	W 7–0		
November 13		at Atlanta	Atlanta, GA	W 7–0		
November 25	2:00 p.m.	Lincoln (PA)	Howard Stadium; Washington, DC	W 32–0		
All times are in Eastern time
