= 1926 Richmond Spiders football team =

American college football season

1926 Richmond Spiders football
- Conference: Independent
- Record: 2–7
- Head coach: Frank Dobson (13th season)
- Captain: T. Ryland Sanford Jr.
- Home stadium: Tate Field

1926 Southern college football independents records
	Conf.			Overall
Team	W	L	T	W		L		T
Loyola (LA)		–		10	–	0	–	0
Miami (FL)		–		8	–	0	–	0
Howard		–		7	–	0	–	0
Delaware State		–		1	–	0	–	0
No. 2 Navy		–		9	–	0	–	1
Wesley		–		6	–	1	–	0
Texas Tech		–		6	–	1	–	3
Davidson		–		7	–	2	–	1
Georgetown		–		7	–	2	–	1
William & Mary		–		7	–	3	–	0
Georgia Normal		–		5	–	3	–	1
Hampden–Sydney		–		5	–	2	–	3
George Washington		–		5	–	4	–	0
Middle Tennessee State Teachers		–		4	–	2	–	1
Spring Hill		–		3	–	2	–	1
Texas A&I		–		4	–	3	–	0
Wake Forest		–		5	–	4	–	1
Texas Mines		–		3	–	4	–	0
Mississippi State Teachers		–		3	–	4	–	1
Tennessee Docs		–		3	–	5	–	1
Catholic University		–		3	–	5	–	0
Delaware		–		3	–	5	–	0
East Tennessee State Teachers		–		2	–	4	–	1
Duke		–		3	–	6	–	0
Richmond		–		2	–	7	–	0
Harding		–		1	–	5	–	0
West Tennessee State Teachers		–		1	–	8	–	0
Rankings from Dickinson System

The 1926 Richmond Spiders football team was an American football team that represented the University of Richmond as an independent during the 1926 college football season. Led by 13th-year head coach, Frank Dobson, the Spiders compiled a record of 2–7. Joe DeMotte played for Richmond. Richmond played their home games at Tate Field on Mayo Island.

== Schedule ==
Date	Time	Opponent	Site	Result	Attendance	Source
September 25		at VMI	Alumni Field; Lexington, VA (rivalry)	L 0–10		
October 2	3:00 p.m.	Duke	Tate Field; Richmond, VA	W 9–7		
October 9		at Navy	Thompson Stadium; Annapolis, MD	L 0–26		
October 16		at Johns Hopkins	Baltimore, MD	L 3–7		
October 23		at Randolph–Macon	Ashland, VA	W 28–0		
October 30	2:30 p.m.	Roanoke	Tate Field; Richmond, VA	L 0–6		
November 6		vs. St. John's (MD)	League Park; Norfolk, VA	L 7–10		
November 13		Hampden–Sydney	Richmond, VA	L 7–20		
November 25	2:30 p.m.	William & Mary	Tate Field; Richmond, VA (rivalry)	L 0–14	7,000	
All times are in Eastern time
