= 1926 Georgia Normal Blue Tide football team =

American college football season

1926 Georgia Normal Blue Tide football
- Conference: Independent
- Record: 5–3–1
- Head coach: E. G. Cromartie (3rd season)

1926 Southern college football independents records
	Conf.			Overall
Team	W	L	T	W		L		T
Loyola (LA)		–		10	–	0	–	0
Miami (FL)		–		8	–	0	–	0
Howard		–		7	–	0	–	0
Delaware State		–		1	–	0	–	0
No. 2 Navy		–		9	–	0	–	1
Wesley		–		6	–	1	–	0
Texas Tech		–		6	–	1	–	3
Davidson		–		7	–	2	–	1
Georgetown		–		7	–	2	–	1
William & Mary		–		7	–	3	–	0
Georgia Normal		–		5	–	3	–	1
Hampden–Sydney		–		5	–	2	–	3
George Washington		–		5	–	4	–	0
Middle Tennessee State Teachers		–		4	–	2	–	1
Spring Hill		–		3	–	2	–	1
Texas A&I		–		4	–	3	–	0
Wake Forest		–		5	–	4	–	1
Texas Mines		–		3	–	4	–	0
Mississippi State Teachers		–		3	–	4	–	1
Tennessee Docs		–		3	–	5	–	1
Catholic University		–		3	–	5	–	0
Delaware		–		3	–	5	–	0
East Tennessee State Teachers		–		2	–	4	–	1
Duke		–		3	–	6	–	0
Richmond		–		2	–	7	–	0
Harding		–		1	–	5	–	0
West Tennessee State Teachers		–		1	–	8	–	0
Rankings from Dickinson System

The 1926 Georgia Normal Blue Tide football team represented Georgia Normal School—now known as Georgia Southern University—as an independent during the 1926 college football season. Led by E. G. Cromartie in his third and final season as head coach, Georgia Normal compiled a record of 5–3–1.

== Schedule ==
Date	Opponent	Site	Result	Source
	South Georgia State		W 6–0	
October 15	Benedictine College (GA)	Statesboro, GA	W 13–0	
October 22	at Georgia Military	Milledgeville, GA	L 2–12	
	Piedmont		T 0–0	
November 1	at South Georgia A&M	Tifton, GA	L 0–6	
November 6	Academy of Richmond County	Augusta, GA	L 0–54	
November 11	Brewton–Parker	Statesboro, GA	W 12–0	
November 19	Fort Screven	Statesboro, GA	W 14–0	
	Brewton–Parker		W 7–6	
