= 1926 Hampden–Sydney Tigers football team =

American college football season

1926 Hampden–Sydney Tigers football
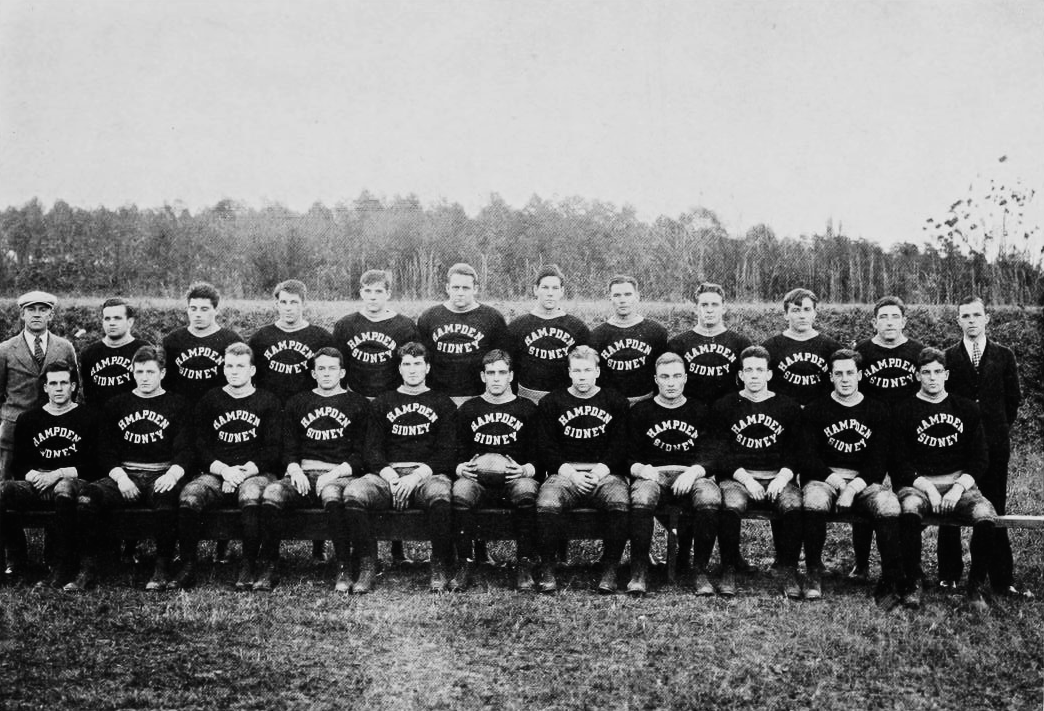
- Conference: Independent
- Record: 5–2–3
- Head coach: Charles A. Bernier (9th season)

1926 Southern college football independents records
	Conf.			Overall
Team	W	L	T	W		L		T
Loyola (LA)		–		10	–	0	–	0
Miami (FL)		–		8	–	0	–	0
Howard		–		7	–	0	–	0
Delaware State		–		1	–	0	–	0
No. 2 Navy		–		9	–	0	–	1
Wesley		–		6	–	1	–	0
Texas Tech		–		6	–	1	–	3
Davidson		–		7	–	2	–	1
Georgetown		–		7	–	2	–	1
William & Mary		–		7	–	3	–	0
Georgia Normal		–		5	–	3	–	1
Hampden–Sydney		–		5	–	2	–	3
George Washington		–		5	–	4	–	0
Middle Tennessee State Teachers		–		4	–	2	–	1
Spring Hill		–		3	–	2	–	1
Texas A&I		–		4	–	3	–	0
Wake Forest		–		5	–	4	–	1
Texas Mines		–		3	–	4	–	0
Mississippi State Teachers		–		3	–	4	–	1
Tennessee Docs		–		3	–	5	–	1
Catholic University		–		3	–	5	–	0
Delaware		–		3	–	5	–	0
East Tennessee State Teachers		–		2	–	4	–	1
Duke		–		3	–	6	–	0
Richmond		–		2	–	7	–	0
Harding		–		1	–	5	–	0
West Tennessee State Teachers		–		1	–	8	–	0
Rankings from Dickinson System

The 1926 Hampden–Sydney Tigers football team represented Hampden–Sydney College during the 1926 college football season. Led by Charles A. Bernier in his ninth season as the head coach, the Tigers compiled a record of 5–2–3.

== Schedule ==
Date	Opponent	Site	Result	Attendance	Source
September 25	at Virginia	Lambeth Field; Charlottesville, VA	T 0–0		
October 2	at VPI	Miles Stadium; Blacksburg, VA	L 0–30		
October 9	Randolph–Macon	Venable Field; Hampden Sydney, VA	W 19–0		
October 16	Lynchburg^{†}	Venable Field; Hampden Sydney, VA	W 24–0		
October 23	at Roanoke	Maroon Field; Salem, VA	L 0–3		
October 30	at Elon	Elon, NC	W 30–0		
November 6	at Davidson	Wearn Field; Charlotte, NC	W 12–7		
November 13	at Richmond	Tate Field; Richmond, VA	W 20–7		
November 20	at Florida	Plant Field; Tampa, FL	T 0–0	4,500	
November 25	Marshall	Venable Field; Hampden Sydney, VA	T 0–0		
^{†}Homecoming

== Game summaries ==
=== Virginia ===
Week 1: Hampden–Sydney vs. Virginia

Team	1	2	3	4	Total
Hampden–Sydney	0	0	0	0	0
Virginia	0	0	0	0	0

- Date: September 25
- Location: Lambreth Field
  Charlottesville, VA

=== Richmond ===
Week 8: Hampden–Sydney vs. Richmond

Team	1	2	3	4	Total
• Hampden–Sydney	0	0	0	20	20
Richmond	7	0	0	0	7

- Date: November 13
- Location: Mayo Island Park
  Richmond, VA
- Referee: Peake (V.P.I.)

The Tigers trounced the Spiders in Richmond to a final score of 20–7.

=== Florida ===
Week 9: Hampden–Sydney vs. Florida

Team	1	2	3	4	Total
Hampden–Sydney	0	0	0	0	0
Florida	0	0	0	0	0

- Date: November 20
- Location: Plant Field
  Tampa, FL
- Game attendance: 10,000

The Gators and the Tigers fought to a scoreless tie. Tommy Owens suffered a broken collarbone.

== Personnel ==
=== Coaching staff ===
Name	Position	Seasons at Hampden–Sydney	Alma mater
Yank Bernier	Head coach	9th	Hampden–Sydney (1912)
Alfred Ashton Adkins, Jr.	Captain	Unknown	Unknown
William Dabney Jarman	Manager	Unknown	Unknown
James Montgomery Kelly, Jr.	Assistant Manager	Unknown	Unknown
Thomas Edward Hodges	Assistant Manager	Unknown	Unknown

=== Roster ===
1926 Hampden–Sydney Tigers roster
Quarterbacks: John Russell Brinser Senior; Forest Edward Sevy Freshman; Ends: Charles Edward Turley Sophomore; Robert Lee Ulysses Garred Freshman; Tackles: Harry Seig Myles Junior; Stuart Barrett Worden Sophomore; David Jackson Savage Freshman; Guards: Robert Lee Nance Senior; Hugh Lawrence Blanton Sophomore	Centers: Edwin Royall Carter, Jr. Sophomore; Alfred Kelly Dudley Senior; Halfbacks: Alfred Ashton Adkins, Jr. Senior; William Cahill Richardson Senior; Ward Marston Palmer Senior; Fullback: Hugh Garland Edmunds Junior
