= 1926 Texas Mines Miners football team =

American college football season

1926 Texas Mines Miners football
- Conference: Independent
- Record: 3–4
- Head coach: George B. Powell (3rd season)

1926 Southern college football independents records
| | Conf. | | | Overall |
| Team | W | L | T | W | | L | | T |
|---|---|---|---|---|---|---|---|---|
| Loyola (LA) | | – | | 10 | – | 0 | – | 0 |
| Miami (FL) | | – | | 8 | – | 0 | – | 0 |
| Howard | | – | | 7 | – | 0 | – | 0 |
| Delaware State | | – | | 1 | – | 0 | – | 0 |
| No. 2 Navy | | – | | 9 | – | 0 | – | 1 |
| Wesley | | – | | 6 | – | 1 | – | 0 |
| Texas Tech | | – | | 6 | – | 1 | – | 3 |
| Davidson | | – | | 7 | – | 2 | – | 1 |
| Georgetown | | – | | 7 | – | 2 | – | 1 |
| William & Mary | | – | | 7 | – | 3 | – | 0 |
| Georgia Normal | | – | | 5 | – | 3 | – | 1 |
| Hampden–Sydney | | – | | 5 | – | 2 | – | 3 |
| George Washington | | – | | 5 | – | 4 | – | 0 |
| Middle Tennessee State Teachers | | – | | 4 | – | 2 | – | 1 |
| Spring Hill | | – | | 3 | – | 2 | – | 1 |
| Texas A&I | | – | | 4 | – | 3 | – | 0 |
| Wake Forest | | – | | 5 | – | 4 | – | 1 |
| Texas Mines | | – | | 3 | – | 4 | – | 0 |
| Mississippi State Teachers | | – | | 3 | – | 4 | – | 1 |
| Tennessee Docs | | – | | 3 | – | 5 | – | 1 |
| Catholic University | | – | | 3 | – | 5 | – | 0 |
| Delaware | | – | | 3 | – | 5 | – | 0 |
| East Tennessee State Teachers | | – | | 2 | – | 4 | – | 1 |
| Duke | | – | | 3 | – | 6 | – | 0 |
| Richmond | | – | | 2 | – | 7 | – | 0 |
| Harding | | – | | 1 | – | 5 | – | 0 |
| West Tennessee State Teachers | | – | | 1 | – | 8 | – | 0 |
Rankings from Dickinson System

The 1926 Texas Mines Miners football team, sometimes known as the "Muckers", was an American football team that represented Texas School of Mines (now known as the University of Texas at El Paso) as an independent during the 1926 college football season. In its third and final season under head coach George B. Powell, the team compiled a 3–4 record and outscored opponents by a total of 106 to 92. The team lost its rivalry game with New Mexico A&M by a 10–8 score.

== Schedule ==
| Date | Opponent | Site | Result | Attendance | Source |
|---|---|---|---|---|---|
| October 9 | Silver City Teachers | Dudley Field; El Paso, TX | W 25–3 | | |
| October 23 | at New Mexico | Lobo Field; Albuquerque, NM | L 7–19 | | |
| October 30 | at New Mexico Military | Roswell, NM | W 20–7 | | |
| November 6 | New Mexico A&M | Dudley Field; El Paso, TX (rivalry) | L 8–10 | 700 | |
| November 13 | Sul Ross | Dudley Field; El Paso, TX | L 0–21 | | |
| November 20 | New Mexico Mines | El Paso, TX | W 40–0 | | |
| November 25 | St. Edward's | Dudley Field; El Paso, TX | L 6–32 | 2,500 | |
