= 1926 Loyola Wolf Pack football team =

American college football season

1926 Loyola Wolf Pack football
- Conference: Independent
- Record: 10–0
- Head coach: Eddie Reed (1st season)
- Home stadium: Loyola Stadium

1926 Southern college football independents records
	Conf.			Overall
Team	W	L	T	W		L		T
Loyola (LA)		–		10	–	0	–	0
Miami (FL)		–		8	–	0	–	0
Howard		–		7	–	0	–	0
Delaware State		–		1	–	0	–	0
No. 2 Navy		–		9	–	0	–	1
Wesley		–		6	–	1	–	0
Texas Tech		–		6	–	1	–	3
Davidson		–		7	–	2	–	1
Georgetown		–		7	–	2	–	1
William & Mary		–		7	–	3	–	0
Georgia Normal		–		5	–	3	–	1
Hampden–Sydney		–		5	–	2	–	3
George Washington		–		5	–	4	–	0
Middle Tennessee State Teachers		–		4	–	2	–	1
Spring Hill		–		3	–	2	–	1
Texas A&I		–		4	–	3	–	0
Wake Forest		–		5	–	4	–	1
Texas Mines		–		3	–	4	–	0
Mississippi State Teachers		–		3	–	4	–	1
Tennessee Docs		–		3	–	5	–	1
Catholic University		–		3	–	5	–	0
Delaware		–		3	–	5	–	0
East Tennessee State Teachers		–		2	–	4	–	1
Duke		–		3	–	6	–	0
Richmond		–		2	–	7	–	0
Harding		–		1	–	5	–	0
West Tennessee State Teachers		–		1	–	8	–	0
Rankings from Dickinson System

The 1926 Loyola Wolf Pack football team was an American football team that represented Loyola College of New Orleans (now known as Loyola University New Orleans) as an independent during the 1926 college football season. In its first and only season under head coach Eddie Reed, the team compiled a 10–0 record, shut out seven of ten opponents, and outscored all opponents by a total of 355 to 30.

Quarterback Bucky Moore, sometimes known as Buck Moore or the "Dixie Flyer", left halfback Resney Gremillion, and Aubrey Budge led the team on offense.

== Schedule ==
Date	Opponent	Site	Result	Attendance	Source
September 26	Jefferson College (LA)	Loyola Stadium; New Orleans, LA	W 39–0		
October 2	Baylor	Loyola Stadium; New Orleans, LA	W 13–10		
October 9	Tennessee Docs	Loyola Stadium; New Orleans, LA	W 14–6		
October 16	Detroit	Loyola Stadium; New Orleans, LA	W 38–0	6,000	
October 24	Fort Benning	Loyola Stadium; New Orleans, LA	W 46–0	9,000	
October 31	Catholic University	Loyola Stadium; New Orleans, LA	W 6–0		
November 7	Spring Hill	Loyola Stadium; New Orleans, LA	W 39–0		
November 14	Little Rock	Loyola Stadium; New Orleans, LA	W 44–0	5,500	
November 20	Lincoln Memorial	Loyola Stadium; New Orleans, LA	W 76–0		
November 27	Loyola (IL)	Loyola Stadium; New Orleans, LA	W 40–14	8,000	
