= 1926 Georgetown Blue and Gray football team =

American college football season

1926 Georgetown Blue and Gray football
- Conference: Independent
- Record: 7–2–1
- Head coach: Lou Little (3rd season)
- Captain: Frank McGrath
- Home stadium: Griffith Stadium

1926 Southern college football independents records
| | Conf. | | | Overall |
| Team | W | L | T | W | | L | | T |
|---|---|---|---|---|---|---|---|---|
| Loyola (LA) | | – | | 10 | – | 0 | – | 0 |
| Miami (FL) | | – | | 8 | – | 0 | – | 0 |
| Howard | | – | | 7 | – | 0 | – | 0 |
| Delaware State | | – | | 1 | – | 0 | – | 0 |
| No. 2 Navy | | – | | 9 | – | 0 | – | 1 |
| Wesley | | – | | 6 | – | 1 | – | 0 |
| Texas Tech | | – | | 6 | – | 1 | – | 3 |
| Davidson | | – | | 7 | – | 2 | – | 1 |
| Georgetown | | – | | 7 | – | 2 | – | 1 |
| William & Mary | | – | | 7 | – | 3 | – | 0 |
| Georgia Normal | | – | | 5 | – | 3 | – | 1 |
| Hampden–Sydney | | – | | 5 | – | 2 | – | 3 |
| George Washington | | – | | 5 | – | 4 | – | 0 |
| Middle Tennessee State Teachers | | – | | 4 | – | 2 | – | 1 |
| Spring Hill | | – | | 3 | – | 2 | – | 1 |
| Texas A&I | | – | | 4 | – | 3 | – | 0 |
| Wake Forest | | – | | 5 | – | 4 | – | 1 |
| Texas Mines | | – | | 3 | – | 4 | – | 0 |
| Mississippi State Teachers | | – | | 3 | – | 4 | – | 1 |
| Tennessee Docs | | – | | 3 | – | 5 | – | 1 |
| Catholic University | | – | | 3 | – | 5 | – | 0 |
| Delaware | | – | | 3 | – | 5 | – | 0 |
| East Tennessee State Teachers | | – | | 2 | – | 4 | – | 1 |
| Duke | | – | | 3 | – | 6 | – | 0 |
| Richmond | | – | | 2 | – | 7 | – | 0 |
| Harding | | – | | 1 | – | 5 | – | 0 |
| West Tennessee State Teachers | | – | | 1 | – | 8 | – | 0 |
Rankings from Dickinson System

The 1926 Georgetown Blue and Gray football team represented Georgetown University as an independent during the 1926 college football season. Led by Lou Little in his third season as head coach, the team went 7–2–1.

== Schedule ==
| Date | Opponent | Site | Result | Attendance | Source |
|---|---|---|---|---|---|
| September 25 | Drexel | Griffith Stadium; Washington, DC | W 42–0 | | |
| October 2 | at Pittsburgh | Pitt Stadium; Pittsburgh, PA | T 6–6 | 20,000 | |
| October 9 | Washington College | Griffith Stadium; Washington, DC | W 78–0 | | |
| October 16 | West Virginia | Griffith Stadium; Washington, DC | L 10–13 | 30,000 | |
| October 23 | Elon | Griffith Stadium; Washington, DC | W 60–13 | | |
| October 30 | Lebanon Valley | Griffith Stadium; Washington, DC | W 34–17 | | |
| November 6 | at Syracuse | Archbold Stadium; Syracuse, NY | W 13–7 | 18,000 | |
| November 13 | at Navy | Thompson Stadium; Annapolis, MD | L 7–10 | 22,000 | |
| November 20 | at Fordham | Polo Grounds; New York, NY | W 39–0 | 25,000 | |
| November 27 | at Detroit | University of Detroit Stadium; Detroit, MI | W 19–0 | | |
