= 1926 Duke Blue Devils football team =

American college football season

1926 Duke Blue Devils football
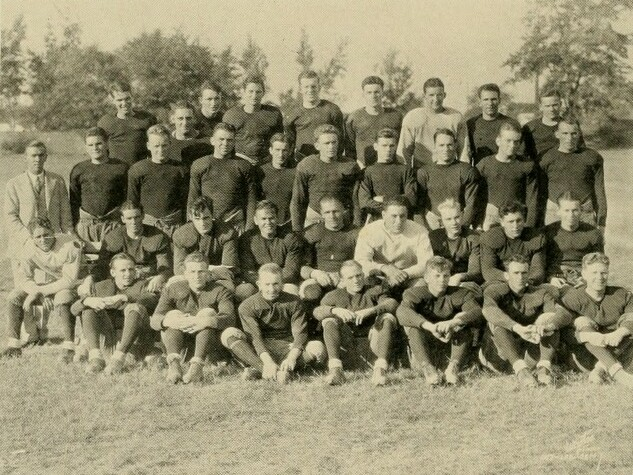
- Conference: Independent
- Record: 3–6
- Head coach: Jimmy DeHart (1st season)
- Captain: James Thompson
- Home stadium: Hanes Field

1926 Southern college football independents records
	Conf.			Overall
Team	W	L	T	W		L		T
Loyola (LA)		–		10	–	0	–	0
Miami (FL)		–		8	–	0	–	0
Howard		–		7	–	0	–	0
Delaware State		–		1	–	0	–	0
No. 2 Navy		–		9	–	0	–	1
Wesley		–		6	–	1	–	0
Texas Tech		–		6	–	1	–	3
Davidson		–		7	–	2	–	1
Georgetown		–		7	–	2	–	1
William & Mary		–		7	–	3	–	0
Georgia Normal		–		5	–	3	–	1
Hampden–Sydney		–		5	–	2	–	3
George Washington		–		5	–	4	–	0
Middle Tennessee State Teachers		–		4	–	2	–	1
Spring Hill		–		3	–	2	–	1
Texas A&I		–		4	–	3	–	0
Wake Forest		–		5	–	4	–	1
Texas Mines		–		3	–	4	–	0
Mississippi State Teachers		–		3	–	4	–	1
Tennessee Docs		–		3	–	5	–	1
Catholic University		–		3	–	5	–	0
Delaware		–		3	–	5	–	0
East Tennessee State Teachers		–		2	–	4	–	1
Duke		–		3	–	6	–	0
Richmond		–		2	–	7	–	0
Harding		–		1	–	5	–	0
West Tennessee State Teachers		–		1	–	8	–	0
Rankings from Dickinson System

The 1926 Duke Blue Devils football team was an American football team that represented Duke University as an independent during the 1926 college football season. In its first season under head coach Jimmy DeHart, the team compiled a 3–6 record and outscored opponents by a total of 124 to 106. James Thompson was the team captain.

== Schedule ==
Date	Time	Opponent	Site	Result	Attendance	Source
September 25		Guilford	Hanes Field; Durham, NC	W 32–0		
October 2	3:00 p.m.	at Richmond	Tate Field; Richmond, VA	L 7–9		
October 9		Elon	Hanes Field; Durham, NC	W 32–0		
October 16		at North Carolina	Emerson Field; Chapel Hill, NC (rivalry)	L 0–6	5,000–7,500	
October 23		at Columbia	Baker Field; New York, NY	L 0–24	7,000–8,000	
October 30		vs. Wake Forest	Wayne County fairgrounds; Goldsboro, NC (rivalry)	L 0–21	5,000	
November 13		at NC State	Riddick Stadium; Raleigh, NC (rivalry)	L 19–26		
November 19		Wofford	Hanes Field; Durham, NC	W 34–0		
November 25		Davidson^{†}	Hanes Field; Durham, NC	L 0–20	7,500	
^{†}Homecoming; All times are in Eastern time
