= 1926 Miami Hurricanes football team =

American college football season

1926 Miami Hurricanes football
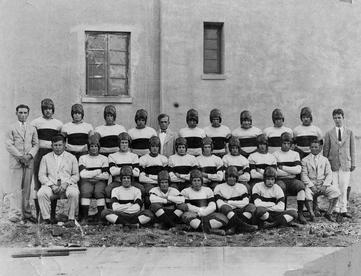
- The 1926 Miami Hurricanes football team in its first season of play
- Conference: Independent
- Record: 8–0
- Head coach: Cub Buck (1st season)
- Home stadium: University Stadium

1926 Southern college football independents records
	Conf.			Overall
Team	W	L	T	W		L		T
Loyola (LA)		–		10	–	0	–	0
Miami (FL)		–		8	–	0	–	0
Howard		–		7	–	0	–	0
Delaware State		–		1	–	0	–	0
No. 2 Navy		–		9	–	0	–	1
Wesley		–		6	–	1	–	0
Texas Tech		–		6	–	1	–	3
Davidson		–		7	–	2	–	1
Georgetown		–		7	–	2	–	1
William & Mary		–		7	–	3	–	0
Georgia Normal		–		5	–	3	–	1
Hampden–Sydney		–		5	–	2	–	3
George Washington		–		5	–	4	–	0
Middle Tennessee State Teachers		–		4	–	2	–	1
Spring Hill		–		3	–	2	–	1
Texas A&I		–		4	–	3	–	0
Wake Forest		–		5	–	4	–	1
Texas Mines		–		3	–	4	–	0
Mississippi State Teachers		–		3	–	4	–	1
Tennessee Docs		–		3	–	5	–	1
Catholic University		–		3	–	5	–	0
Delaware		–		3	–	5	–	0
East Tennessee State Teachers		–		2	–	4	–	1
Duke		–		3	–	6	–	0
Richmond		–		2	–	7	–	0
Harding		–		1	–	5	–	0
West Tennessee State Teachers		–		1	–	8	–	0
Rankings from Dickinson System

The 1926 Miami Hurricanes football team was an American football team that represented the University of Miami as an independent during the 1926 college football season. In their first year under head coach Cub Buck, the team compiled a 8–0 record. Miami played their home games at University Stadium in Coral Gables, Florida. The team was only a freshman team, but was the first to play football for the university.

Before their first season began, plans for a 50,000-seat stadium were proposed by Bowman Foster Ashe, the university's first president. Work began on a temporary, 8,000-seat structure when on September 17, 1926, a hurricane destroyed much of South Florida, killing more than 130 people, and removing the plans for a football stadium. This postponed the season, but also gave the team its nickname, the Miami Hurricanes.

== Schedule ==
Date	Opponent	Site	Result	Attendance	Source
October 23	Rollins freshmen	University Stadium; Coral Gables, FL	W 7–0	3,000	
October 30	Southern College (FL) freshmen	University Stadium; Coral Gables, FL	W 12–0		
November 6	Mercer freshmen	University Stadium; Coral Gables, FL	W 22–6		
November 13	Stetson freshmen	University Stadium; Coral Gables, FL	W 20–0		
November 20	Loyola (LA) freshmen	University Stadium; Coral Gables, FL	W 6–0		
November 25	University of Havana	University Stadium; Coral Gables, FL	W 23–0	6,000	
December 27	at University of Havana	Havana, Cuba	W 23–0		
January 1	Howard (AL) freshmen	University Stadium; Coral Gables, FL	W 9–7		
