= 1926 Wake Forest Demon Deacons football team =

American college football season

1926 Wake Forest Demon Deacons football
- Conference: Independent
- Record: 5–4–1
- Head coach: James A. Baldwin (1st season)
- Captain: Blaine Rackley
- Home stadium: Gore Field

1926 Southern college football independents records
	Conf.			Overall
Team	W	L	T	W		L		T
Loyola (LA)		–		10	–	0	–	0
Miami (FL)		–		8	–	0	–	0
Howard		–		7	–	0	–	0
Delaware State		–		1	–	0	–	0
No. 2 Navy		–		9	–	0	–	1
Wesley		–		6	–	1	–	0
Texas Tech		–		6	–	1	–	3
Davidson		–		7	–	2	–	1
Georgetown		–		7	–	2	–	1
William & Mary		–		7	–	3	–	0
Georgia Normal		–		5	–	3	–	1
Hampden–Sydney		–		5	–	2	–	3
George Washington		–		5	–	4	–	0
Middle Tennessee State Teachers		–		4	–	2	–	1
Spring Hill		–		3	–	2	–	1
Texas A&I		–		4	–	3	–	0
Wake Forest		–		5	–	4	–	1
Texas Mines		–		3	–	4	–	0
Mississippi State Teachers		–		3	–	4	–	1
Tennessee Docs		–		3	–	5	–	1
Catholic University		–		3	–	5	–	0
Delaware		–		3	–	5	–	0
East Tennessee State Teachers		–		2	–	4	–	1
Duke		–		3	–	6	–	0
Richmond		–		2	–	7	–	0
Harding		–		1	–	5	–	0
West Tennessee State Teachers		–		1	–	8	–	0
Rankings from Dickinson System

The 1926 Wake Forest Demon Deacons football team was an American football team that represented Wake Forest University during the 1926 college football season. In its first season under head coach James A. Baldwin, the team compiled a 5–4–1 record.

== Schedule ==
Date	Opponent	Site	Result	Attendance	Source
September 25	North Carolina	Gore Field; Wake Forest, NC (rivalry)	W 13–0	8,000	
October 2	vs. Wofford	Salisbury, NC	W 27–0		
October 9	at Furman	Manly Field; Greenville, SC	L 0–10		
October 16	vs. Presbyterian	McCormick Field; Asheville, NC	L 0–13		
October 23	vs. Davidson	Wearn Field; Charlotte, NC	T 3–3	8,000	
October 30	vs. Duke	Wayne County fairgrounds; Goldsboro, NC (rivalry)	W 21–0	5,000	
November 6	Elon	Gore Field; Wake Forest, NC	W 53–0		
November 13	vs. William & Mary	League Park; Norfolk, VA	L 6–13		
November 20	Guilford	Gore Field; Wake Forest, NC	W 60–0		
November 25	at NC State	Riddick Stadium; Raleigh, NC (rivalry)	L 3–7	11,000	
