= 1926 Mississippi State Teachers Yellow Jackets football team =

American college football season

1926 Mississippi State Teachers Yellow Jackets football
- Conference: Independent
- Record: 3–4–1
- Head coach: William Herschel Bobo (3rd season)
- Home stadium: Kamper Park

1926 Southern college football independents records
	Conf.			Overall
Team	W	L	T	W		L		T
Loyola (LA)		–		10	–	0	–	0
Miami (FL)		–		8	–	0	–	0
Howard		–		7	–	0	–	0
Delaware State		–		1	–	0	–	0
No. 2 Navy		–		9	–	0	–	1
Wesley		–		6	–	1	–	0
Texas Tech		–		6	–	1	–	3
Davidson		–		7	–	2	–	1
Georgetown		–		7	–	2	–	1
William & Mary		–		7	–	3	–	0
Georgia Normal		–		5	–	3	–	1
Hampden–Sydney		–		5	–	2	–	3
George Washington		–		5	–	4	–	0
Middle Tennessee State Teachers		–		4	–	2	–	1
Spring Hill		–		3	–	2	–	1
Texas A&I		–		4	–	3	–	0
Wake Forest		–		5	–	4	–	1
Texas Mines		–		3	–	4	–	0
Mississippi State Teachers		–		3	–	4	–	1
Tennessee Docs		–		3	–	5	–	1
Catholic University		–		3	–	5	–	0
Delaware		–		3	–	5	–	0
East Tennessee State Teachers		–		2	–	4	–	1
Duke		–		3	–	6	–	0
Richmond		–		2	–	7	–	0
Harding		–		1	–	5	–	0
West Tennessee State Teachers		–		1	–	8	–	0
Rankings from Dickinson System

The 1926 Mississippi State Teachers Yellow Jackets football team was an American football team that represented the Mississippi State Teachers College (now known as the University of Southern Mississippi) as an independent during the 1926 college football season. In their third year under head coach William Herschel Bobo, the team compiled a 3–4–1 record.

== Schedule ==
Date	Opponent	Site	Result	Source
September 25	at Southwestern Louisiana	S.L.I. Stadium; Lafayette, LA	L 6–33	
October 2	Clarke College (MS)	Kamper Park; Hattiesburg, MS	W 12–7	
October 9	at Spring Hill	Hartwell Field; Mobile, AL	L 6–27	
October 16	Louisiana College	Kamper Park; Hattiesburg, MS	W 14–7	
October 22	at Perkinston	Perkinston, MS	W 26–3	
October 30	Gulf Coast Military Academy	Kamper Park; Hattiesburg, MS	T 6–6	
November 13	Pearl River	Kamper Park; Hattiesburg, MS	L 0–20	
November 27	at Mississippi A&M freshmen	Scott Field; Starkville, MS	L 7–26	
