= 1926 William & Mary Indians football team =

American college football season

1926 William & Mary Indians football

Southern champion
- Conference: Independent
- Record: 7–3
- Head coach: J. Wilder Tasker (4th season)
- Captain: Arthur Matsu
- Home stadium: Cary Field

1926 Southern college football independents records
	Conf.			Overall
Team	W	L	T	W		L		T
Loyola (LA)		–		10	–	0	–	0
Miami (FL)		–		8	–	0	–	0
Howard		–		7	–	0	–	0
Delaware State		–		1	–	0	–	0
No. 2 Navy		–		9	–	0	–	1
Wesley		–		6	–	1	–	0
Texas Tech		–		6	–	1	–	3
Davidson		–		7	–	2	–	1
Georgetown		–		7	–	2	–	1
William & Mary		–		7	–	3	–	0
Georgia Normal		–		5	–	3	–	1
Hampden–Sydney		–		5	–	2	–	3
George Washington		–		5	–	4	–	0
Middle Tennessee State Teachers		–		4	–	2	–	1
Spring Hill		–		3	–	2	–	1
Texas A&I		–		4	–	3	–	0
Wake Forest		–		5	–	4	–	1
Texas Mines		–		3	–	4	–	0
Mississippi State Teachers		–		3	–	4	–	1
Tennessee Docs		–		3	–	5	–	1
Catholic University		–		3	–	5	–	0
Delaware		–		3	–	5	–	0
East Tennessee State Teachers		–		2	–	4	–	1
Duke		–		3	–	6	–	0
Richmond		–		2	–	7	–	0
Harding		–		1	–	5	–	0
West Tennessee State Teachers		–		1	–	8	–	0
Rankings from Dickinson System

The 1926 William & Mary Indians football team represented the College of William & Mary as an independent during the 1926 college football season. Led by fourth-year head coach J. Wilder Tasker, the Indians compiled a record of 7–3.

== Schedule ==
Date	Time	Opponent	Site	Result	Attendance	Source
September 25		Randolph–Macon	Williamsburg, VA	W 35–0		
October 2		Loyola (MD)	Williamsburg, VA	W 19–0		
October 9		at Syracuse	Archbold Stadium; Syracuse, NY	L 0–35	12,000	
October 16		at Harvard	Harvard Stadium; Boston, MA	L 7–27		
October 23		George Washington	Cary Field; Williamsburg, VA	W 14–0		
October 30		vs. Lynchburg	Newport News, VA	W 48–0		
November 6		at Columbia	Baker Field; New York, NY	L 10–13		
November 13		vs. Wake Forest	League Park; Norfolk, VA	W 13–6		
November 25	2:30 p.m.	at Richmond	Tate Field; Richmond, VA (rivalry)	W 14–0	7,000	
December 4		at Chattanooga	Chamberlain Field; Chattanooga, TN	W 9–6		
