= 1926 Spring Hill Badgers football team =

American college football season

1926 Spring Hill Badgers football
- Conference: Independent
- Record: 3–2–1
- Head coach: William T. Daly (2nd season)

1926 Southern college football independents records
	Conf.			Overall
Team	W	L	T	W		L		T
Loyola (LA)		–		10	–	0	–	0
Miami (FL)		–		8	–	0	–	0
Howard		–		7	–	0	–	0
Delaware State		–		1	–	0	–	0
No. 2 Navy		–		9	–	0	–	1
Wesley		–		6	–	1	–	0
Texas Tech		–		6	–	1	–	3
Davidson		–		7	–	2	–	1
Georgetown		–		7	–	2	–	1
William & Mary		–		7	–	3	–	0
Georgia Normal		–		5	–	3	–	1
Hampden–Sydney		–		5	–	2	–	3
George Washington		–		5	–	4	–	0
Middle Tennessee State Teachers		–		4	–	2	–	1
Spring Hill		–		3	–	2	–	1
Texas A&I		–		4	–	3	–	0
Wake Forest		–		5	–	4	–	1
Texas Mines		–		3	–	4	–	0
Mississippi State Teachers		–		3	–	4	–	1
Tennessee Docs		–		3	–	5	–	1
Catholic University		–		3	–	5	–	0
Delaware		–		3	–	5	–	0
East Tennessee State Teachers		–		2	–	4	–	1
Duke		–		3	–	6	–	0
Richmond		–		2	–	7	–	0
Harding		–		1	–	5	–	0
West Tennessee State Teachers		–		1	–	8	–	0
Rankings from Dickinson System

The 1926 Spring Hill Badgers football team was an American football team that represented Spring Hill College, a Jesuit college in Mobile, Alabama, during the 1926 college football season. In its second season under head coach William T. Daly, the team compiled a 3–2–1 record.

== Schedule ==
Date	Opponent	Site	Result	Attendance	Source
October 9	Mississippi State Teachers	Mobile, AL	W 27–6		
October 16	vs. Stetson	Plant Field; Tampa, FL	T 0–0	5,000	
October 30	Clarke (MS)	Mobile, AL	W 53–0		
November 7	at Loyola (LA)	Loyola Stadium; New Orleans, LA	L 0–39		
November 11	at Marion	Robbins Field; Selma, AL	L 0–7		
November 25	Jacksonville State	Monroe Park; Mobile, AL	W 30–0		
