= 1926 Harding Bisons football team =

American college football season

1926 Harding Bisons football
- Conference: Independent
- Record: 1–5
- Head coach: Clyde Matthews (1st season)

1926 Southern college football independents records
	Conf.			Overall
Team	W	L	T	W		L		T
Loyola (LA)		–		10	–	0	–	0
Miami (FL)		–		8	–	0	–	0
Howard		–		7	–	0	–	0
Delaware State		–		1	–	0	–	0
No. 2 Navy		–		9	–	0	–	1
Wesley		–		6	–	1	–	0
Texas Tech		–		6	–	1	–	3
Davidson		–		7	–	2	–	1
Georgetown		–		7	–	2	–	1
William & Mary		–		7	–	3	–	0
Georgia Normal		–		5	–	3	–	1
Hampden–Sydney		–		5	–	2	–	3
George Washington		–		5	–	4	–	0
Middle Tennessee State Teachers		–		4	–	2	–	1
Spring Hill		–		3	–	2	–	1
Texas A&I		–		4	–	3	–	0
Wake Forest		–		5	–	4	–	1
Texas Mines		–		3	–	4	–	0
Mississippi State Teachers		–		3	–	4	–	1
Tennessee Docs		–		3	–	5	–	1
Catholic University		–		3	–	5	–	0
Delaware		–		3	–	5	–	0
East Tennessee State Teachers		–		2	–	4	–	1
Duke		–		3	–	6	–	0
Richmond		–		2	–	7	–	0
Harding		–		1	–	5	–	0
West Tennessee State Teachers		–		1	–	8	–	0
Rankings from Dickinson System

The 1926 Harding Bisons football team represented Harding College as an independent during the 1926 college football season. Led by player-coach Clyde "Doc" Matthews, a third-year junior, the Bisons compiled an overall record of 1–5. Matthews return to playing only in 1927, but for 1926, he not only coached while playing on the field, but he also posed for team pictures in a coaching uniform instead of a player's uniform. Harding's yearbook The Petit Jean also hints at other players besides Matthews helping the team along as coaches during the year.

"the team was handicapped all year by the lack of an experienced coach. Although the boys in charge did admirable work considering their lack of experience, they could not have been expected to develop a team in one year that could cope with so stiff a schedule."

The 1926 season was met with excitement because of the upgraded schedule, signaling a feeling that the Harding program had truly arrived onto the scene of real college football, instead of playing mostly high schools and collegiate B or C teams. The 1926 schedule also marked the beginning of competition with Henderson-Brown College, now known as Henderson State University.

The season was also significant for playing the Arkansas Razorbacks, although not the Arkansas varsity but instead the Razorback's freshmen. The Arkansas head coach at that time was Francis Schmidt, who was nicknamed Francis "Close the Gates of Mercy" Schmidt, because of his love for running up the score on inferior teams. And the young Harding Bisons program was shown no mercy, losing 0-74.

== Schedule ==
Date	Opponent	Site	Result
October 2	at Arkansas Teachers College 2nd String	Conway, Arkansas	L 0–7
October 8	at Arkansas Freshmen	Fayetteville, AR	L 0–74
October 16	Subiaco College	Morrilton, AR	W 19–0
November 5	at College of the Ozarks	Clarksville, AR	L 0–25
November 11	at Henderson-Brown College	Arkadelphia, AR	L 0–52
November 18	Magnolia A&M	Morrilton, AR	L 0–21
