= 1926 Delaware Fightin' Blue Hens football team =

American college football season

1926 Delaware Fightin' Blue Hens football
- Conference: Independent
- Record: 3–5
- Head coach: Frank M. Forstburg (2nd season)
- Home stadium: Frazer Field

1926 Southern college football independents records
	Conf.			Overall
Team	W	L	T	W		L		T
Loyola (LA)		–		10	–	0	–	0
Miami (FL)		–		8	–	0	–	0
Howard		–		7	–	0	–	0
Delaware State		–		1	–	0	–	0
No. 2 Navy		–		9	–	0	–	1
Wesley		–		6	–	1	–	0
Texas Tech		–		6	–	1	–	3
Davidson		–		7	–	2	–	1
Georgetown		–		7	–	2	–	1
William & Mary		–		7	–	3	–	0
Georgia Normal		–		5	–	3	–	1
Hampden–Sydney		–		5	–	2	–	3
George Washington		–		5	–	4	–	0
Middle Tennessee State Teachers		–		4	–	2	–	1
Spring Hill		–		3	–	2	–	1
Texas A&I		–		4	–	3	–	0
Wake Forest		–		5	–	4	–	1
Texas Mines		–		3	–	4	–	0
Mississippi State Teachers		–		3	–	4	–	1
Tennessee Docs		–		3	–	5	–	1
Catholic University		–		3	–	5	–	0
Delaware		–		3	–	5	–	0
East Tennessee State Teachers		–		2	–	4	–	1
Duke		–		3	–	6	–	0
Richmond		–		2	–	7	–	0
Harding		–		1	–	5	–	0
West Tennessee State Teachers		–		1	–	8	–	0
Rankings from Dickinson System

The 1926 Delaware Fightin' Blue Hens football team was an American football team that represented the University of Delaware in the 1926 college football season. In their second and final season under head coach Frank M. Forstburg, the Blue Hens compiled a 3–5 record and were outscored by a total of 122 to 41. The team played its home games at Frazer Field in Newark, Delaware.

== Schedule ==
Date	Opponent	Site	Result	Attendance	Source
October 2	Drexel	Frazer Field; Newark, DE	L 6–7		
October 9	at Ursinus	Collegeville, PA	W 6–0		
October 16	at Springfield	Springfield, MA	W 3–0		
October 23	at St. John's (MD)	Annapolis, MD	L 3–13		
October 30	at Rutgers	Neilson Field; New Brunswick, NJ	L 0–21	5,000	
November 6	at Swarthmore	Swarthmore, PA	L 7–47		
November 13	Gallaudet	Frazer Field; Newark, DE	W 10–7		
November 20	Haverford	Frazer Field; Newark, DE	L 6–27		
