= 1926 Davidson Wildcats football team =

American college football season

1926 Davidson Wildcats football
- Conference: Independent
- Record: 7–2–1
- Head coach: William L. Younger (4th season)
- Home stadium: Richardson Field

1926 Southern college football independents records
	Conf.			Overall
Team	W	L	T	W		L		T
Loyola (LA)		–		10	–	0	–	0
Miami (FL)		–		8	–	0	–	0
Howard		–		7	–	0	–	0
Delaware State		–		1	–	0	–	0
No. 2 Navy		–		9	–	0	–	1
Wesley		–		6	–	1	–	0
Texas Tech		–		6	–	1	–	3
Davidson		–		7	–	2	–	1
Georgetown		–		7	–	2	–	1
William & Mary		–		7	–	3	–	0
Georgia Normal		–		5	–	3	–	1
Hampden–Sydney		–		5	–	2	–	3
George Washington		–		5	–	4	–	0
Middle Tennessee State Teachers		–		4	–	2	–	1
Spring Hill		–		3	–	2	–	1
Texas A&I		–		4	–	3	–	0
Wake Forest		–		5	–	4	–	1
Texas Mines		–		3	–	4	–	0
Mississippi State Teachers		–		3	–	4	–	1
Tennessee Docs		–		3	–	5	–	1
Catholic University		–		3	–	5	–	0
Delaware		–		3	–	5	–	0
East Tennessee State Teachers		–		2	–	4	–	1
Duke		–		3	–	6	–	0
Richmond		–		2	–	7	–	0
Harding		–		1	–	5	–	0
West Tennessee State Teachers		–		1	–	8	–	0
Rankings from Dickinson System

The 1926 Davidson Wildcats football team was an American football team that represented Davidson College as an independent during the 1926 college football season. In their fourth year under head coach William L. Younger, the team compiled a 7–2–1 record.

== Schedule ==
Date	Opponent	Site	Result	Attendance	Source
September 18	Elon	Richardson Field; Davidson, NC	W 26–0		
September 25	at Wofford	Spartanburg, SC	W 24–6		
October 2	vs. Presbyterian	Winthrop Stadium; Rock Hill, SC	W 3–0		
October 9	Guilford	Richardson Field; Davidson, NC	W 23–0		
October 14	NC State	Riddick Stadium; Raleigh, NC	W 3–0		
October 23	vs. Wake Forest	Wearn Field; Charlotte, NC	T 3–3	8,000	
October 30	vs. VMI	Lynchburg, VA	L 7–12		
November 6	vs. Hampden–Sydney	Wearn Field; Charlotte, NC	L 0–12		
November 13	North Carolina	Richardson Field; Davidson, NC	W 10–0		
November 25	at Duke	Hanes Field; Durham, NC	W 20–0	7,500	
