= 1926 Wesley Wildcats football team =

American college football season

1926 Wesley Wildcats football
- Conference: Independent
- Record: 6–1
- Head coach: Josh S. Faulkner (1st season)
- Captain: Chism

1926 Southern college football independents records
	Conf.			Overall
Team	W	L	T	W		L		T
Loyola (LA)		–		10	–	0	–	0
Miami (FL)		–		8	–	0	–	0
Howard		–		7	–	0	–	0
Delaware State		–		1	–	0	–	0
No. 2 Navy		–		9	–	0	–	1
Wesley		–		6	–	1	–	0
Texas Tech		–		6	–	1	–	3
Davidson		–		7	–	2	–	1
Georgetown		–		7	–	2	–	1
William & Mary		–		7	–	3	–	0
Georgia Normal		–		5	–	3	–	1
Hampden–Sydney		–		5	–	2	–	3
George Washington		–		5	–	4	–	0
Middle Tennessee State Teachers		–		4	–	2	–	1
Spring Hill		–		3	–	2	–	1
Texas A&I		–		4	–	3	–	0
Wake Forest		–		5	–	4	–	1
Texas Mines		–		3	–	4	–	0
Mississippi State Teachers		–		3	–	4	–	1
Tennessee Docs		–		3	–	5	–	1
Catholic University		–		3	–	5	–	0
Delaware		–		3	–	5	–	0
East Tennessee State Teachers		–		2	–	4	–	1
Duke		–		3	–	6	–	0
Richmond		–		2	–	7	–	0
Harding		–		1	–	5	–	0
West Tennessee State Teachers		–		1	–	8	–	0
Rankings from Dickinson System

The 1926 Wesley Wildcats football team represented Wesley Collegiate Institute (later known as Wesley College) in the 1926 college football season as an independent. Led by coach Josh S. Faulkner in their first season since 1909, the Wildcats compiled a 6–1 record, outscoring their opponents 129 to 27. Chism was team captain and Ray Torrey was quarterback. Torrey was considered by some to be the best quarterback in the state of Delaware.

== Schedule ==
Date	Opponent	Site	Result	Source
October 8	Ferris Industrial School		W 56–6	
October 15	at Goldey College	Baynard Stadium; Wilmington, DE	W 6–0	
October 22	Newark High School	Dover, DE	L 6–21	
October 30	at West Nottingham Prep	Colora, MD	W 19–0	
November 3	at Newark High School	Newark, DE	W 12–0	
November 12	Delaware freshmen	Dover, DE	W 6–0	
November 20	Goldey College	Dover, DE	W 24–0	
