= 1926 West Tennessee State Teachers football team =

American college football season

1926 West Tennessee State Teachers football
- Conference: Independent
- Record: 1–8
- Head coach: Zach Curlin (3rd season)
- Captain: Dub Jones
- Home stadium: Memorial Field

1926 Southern college football independents records
	Conf.			Overall
Team	W	L	T	W		L		T
Loyola (LA)		–		10	–	0	–	0
Miami (FL)		–		8	–	0	–	0
Howard		–		7	–	0	–	0
Delaware State		–		1	–	0	–	0
No. 2 Navy		–		9	–	0	–	1
Wesley		–		6	–	1	–	0
Texas Tech		–		6	–	1	–	3
Davidson		–		7	–	2	–	1
Georgetown		–		7	–	2	–	1
William & Mary		–		7	–	3	–	0
Georgia Normal		–		5	–	3	–	1
Hampden–Sydney		–		5	–	2	–	3
George Washington		–		5	–	4	–	0
Middle Tennessee State Teachers		–		4	–	2	–	1
Spring Hill		–		3	–	2	–	1
Texas A&I		–		4	–	3	–	0
Wake Forest		–		5	–	4	–	1
Texas Mines		–		3	–	4	–	0
Mississippi State Teachers		–		3	–	4	–	1
Tennessee Docs		–		3	–	5	–	1
Catholic University		–		3	–	5	–	0
Delaware		–		3	–	5	–	0
East Tennessee State Teachers		–		2	–	4	–	1
Duke		–		3	–	6	–	0
Richmond		–		2	–	7	–	0
Harding		–		1	–	5	–	0
West Tennessee State Teachers		–		1	–	8	–	0
Rankings from Dickinson System

The 1926 West Tennessee State Teachers football team was an American football team that represented West Tennessee State Teachers College (now known as the University of Memphis) as an independent during the 1926 college football season. In their third season under head coach Zach Curlin, West Tennessee State Teachers compiled a 1–8 record.

== Schedule ==
Date	Time	Opponent	Site	Result	Attendance	Source
September 25		at Jonesboro College	Kays Field; Jonesboro, AR	W 19–0		
October 2	2:30 p.m.	at Tennessee Docs	Hodges Field; Memphis, TN	L 0–21	1,000	
October 9	2:30 p.m.	Jonesboro A&M	Memorial Field; Memphis, TN (rivalry)	L 0–7	1,000	
October 16		at Lambuth	Jackson, TN	L 0–7		
October 22	3:00 p.m.	Middle Tennessee State Teachers	Memorial Field; Memphis, TN	L 0–27		
October 29	3:00 p.m.	Bethel (TN)	Memorial Field; Memphis, TN	L 0–13		
November 6		at Union (TN)	Jackson Athletic Park; Jackson, TN	L 0–21		
November 13	2:30 p.m.	at Southwestern (TN)	Fargason Field; Memphis, TN	L 6–27		
November 19		at Little Rock	Kavanaugh Field; Little Rock, AR	L 14–48		
All times are in Central time
