= 1926 college football season =

American college football season

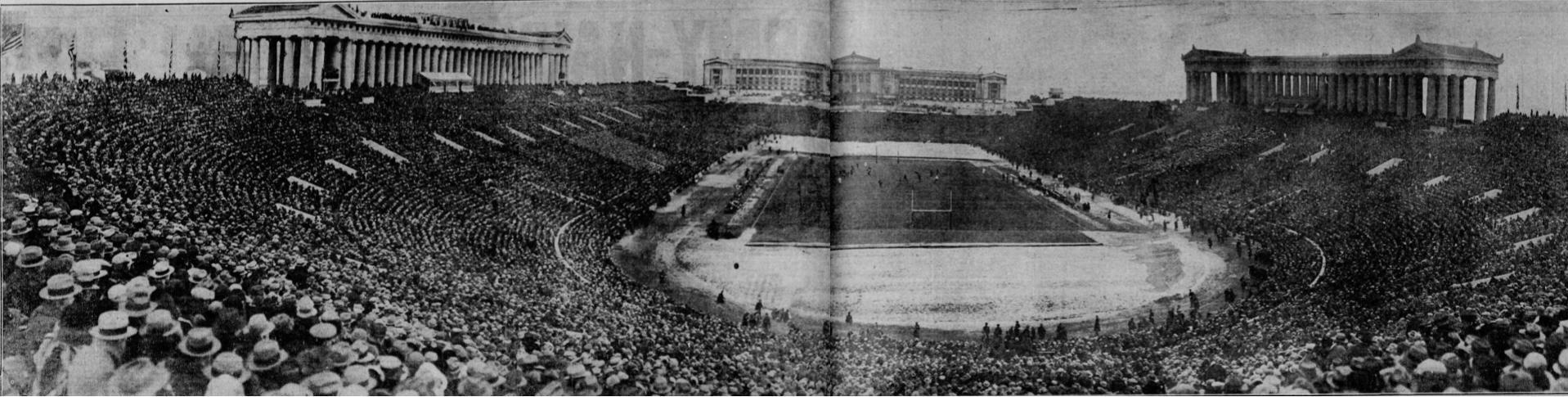
- Army–Navy Game at Soldier Field in Chicago (Nov. 27)
- Number of bowls: 1
- Bowl games: January 1, 1927
- Champion(s): Stanford (Note: named champion at season's end by Dickinson System and awarded the Rissman Trophy; co-champion in retrospective ranking by Sagarin Ratings Elo chess method; co-champion in retroactive rankings by Helms Athletic Foundation, National Championship Foundation); Alabama (Note: champion in retroactive rankings of Berryman QPRS, Billingsley Report, College Football Researchers Association, and Poling System; co-champion in retroactive rankings by Helms Athletic Foundation and National Championship Foundation); Navy (Note: champion in retroactive rankings by Boand System and Houlgate System); Lafayette (Note: champion in retroactive ranking by Parke H. Davis); Michigan (Note: champion in retroactive ranking by Sagarin Ratings Predictor method) (not claimed)

In the 1926 college football season Stanford, coached by Pop Warner, was the top team in the U.S. under the Dickinson System and was awarded the newly established Rissman Trophy. Unbeaten Stanford (10–0) faced unbeaten Alabama (9–0) in the Rose Bowl, and the two teams played to a 7–7 tie.

Other prominent retrospective rankings named Alabama as the season's champion, while two (Helms and NCF) selected Stanford and Alabama to be co-champions. Two prominent retroactive rankings (Boand System and Houlgate System) instead recognized Navy (9–0–1) as the season's champion. The retrospective ranking for Spalding's Official Foot Ball Guide by Parke H. Davis (a renowned football historian and football rules committee member) found Lafayette (9–0), a school where he had previously coached, to have been the season's champion (the only prominent ranking to do so). Jeff Sagarin's "Predictor" method retroactively ranked Michigan (7–1) as the season's champion (the only prominent ranking to do so).

== Conference and program changes ==
=== Conference changes ===
- Five new conferences began play in 1926
  - Buckeye Athletic Association – a conference active through the 1938 season
  - Pacific Northwest Conference – an active NCAA Division III conference now known as the Northwest Conference
  - Midwest Athletic Association – a conference of HBCUs active through the 1966 season that was also later known as the Midwest Conference and the Midwestern Conference
  - Texas Collegiate Athletic Conference – a conference active through the 1955 season
  - Michigan Collegiate Conference – a conference active through the 1932 season; most members now part of the Mid-American Conference

=== Membership changes ===
School	1925 Conference	1926 Conference
Miami Hurricanes	Program Established	Independent

=== Program changes ===
- Kent State Normal College officially changed their nickname from the Silver Foxes to their present moniker, the Golden Flashes.

== September ==
September 18 A few schools opened their seasons early, as Stanford beat Fresno State 44–0. On September 25 Stanford beat visiting Caltech, 13–0 and USC defeated Whittier 74–0; Brown beat the University of Rhode Island, 14–0 and Pennsylvania (which had all 9 of its games scheduled at home in Philadelphia) shut out Franklin & Marshall, 41–0. Lafayette beat Muhlenberg College 35–0 In the South, defending Rose Bowl champion Alabama beat Millsaps College (Jackson, Miss) 54–0. Tennessee defeated Carson-Newman, 13–0.

== October ==
October 2 Navy opened its season with a 17–13 win over Purdue, while Army started with a 21–0 win over Mercy College of Detroit. Brown beat Colby College (of Maine), 35–0 and Pennsylvania beat Johns Hopkins, 40–7. Lafayette won again, beating Schuylkill (which later was merged with Albright College) 47–0;

Stanford defeated Occidental 19–0 and USC defeated Santa Clara 42–0.

Alabama played Vanderbilt at Nashville and won 19–7; Tennessee beat North Carolina, 34–0.

Ohio State opened its season with a 40–0 win over Wittenberg University, while Michigan started with a 42–3 win over visiting Oklahoma State. Northwestern opened its season with a 34–0 win over visiting South Dakota. Notre Dame tuned up with a game against Wisconsin's Beloit College, winning 77–0. In the Missouri Valley, Kansas State beat Texas, 13–3.

October 9 At Annapolis, Navy's football team played a doubleheader, albeit with two different squads. The varsity beat a weak Drake University team, 24–7, and the reserves beat Richmond, 26–0. Army defeated West Virginia's Davis & Elkins College, 21–7. Lafayette beat Pittsburgh, 17–7 and Pennsylvania beat Swarthmore, 44–0.

Ohio State played Ohio Wesleyan and won 47–0 and Northwestern beat Minnesota's Carleton College, 31–3. Michigan crushed Michigan State, 55–3, in a conference game. Notre Dame won at Minnesota, 19–7

Stanford had a 7–3 victory over an amateur team, the Olympic Club (from San Francisco). USC defeated a strong Washington State team, 16–7

Alabama beat Mississippi State 26–7 at a game in Meridian, Mississippi, while Tennessee won at LSU, 14–7. Kansas State won at Creighton 12–0.

October 16 In New York, Columbia University hosted Ohio State in an intersectional game, and lost, 32–7. Brown defeated Bates College 27–14 in Providence, while in Philadelphia, Pennsylvania hosted Chicago and won 27–0. Navy won at Princeton 27–13, while Army played a strong Syracuse team and won 27–21. Lafayette beat Dickinson 30–7.

Stanford defeated Nevada 33–0, and USC beat Occidental, 28–6

At Atlanta, Alabama beat Georgia Tech 21–0. Tennessee had beaten Maryville the day before, 6–0. Notre Dame beat visiting Penn State, 28–0. In Western Conference play, Michigan beat Minnesota, 20–0, Northwestern defeated Indiana 20–0, and Illinois beat Iowa 13–6. Kansas State defeated Kansas, 27–0.

October 23 Brown played its first Ivy opponent, winning 7–0 at Yale. Pennsylvania beat Williams College, 36–0. Navy beat Colgate, 13–7, and Army beat Boston University 41–0. Lafayette defeated Albany, 30–7.

Notre Dame won at Northwestern, handing the Wildcats their first defeat, 6–0, with Rockne's reserves scoring on a touchdown pass. Alabama had a 2–0 win over Sewanee; Tennessee beat Centre College, 30–7. In Pacific Coast Conference games, Stanford won 29–12 at Oregon, and USC beat California at Berkeley, 27–0. In Western Conference play, Ohio State beat Iowa 23–6 and Michigan beat Illinois 13–0.Kansas State went to 5–0–0, winning at Oklahoma, 15–12.

October 30 Navy (5–0–0) and Michigan (4–0–0) played in Baltimore in an intersectional match of unbeatens. Though the Wolverines were heavily favored, Navy blocked a field goal and held Michigan 2 yards from goal in the first half; Hamilton of Navy kicked a field goal, made a key interception to set up a touchdown, and added the point after for a 10–0 win.

In Los Angeles, another big game between unbeatens matched Stanford and Southern California (USC), both 5–0–0, faced off. USC scored first, but Dick Hyland blocked the extra point; after a second Trojan touchdown, the kick failed, and USC had a 12–0 lead. Stanford scored, but the extra point kick hit the upright, and it was 12–6 at halftime. Biff Hoffman's pass to Dick Hyland tied the game for Stanford, and George Bogue's point after kick proved to be the winning margin in Stanford's 13–12 win. Lafayette and Washington & Jefferson were both 5–0–0 when they met in Philadelphia; the Presidents lost to Lafayette, 16–10

At Champaign, Illinois (4–1–0) hosted unbeaten (5–0–0) Pennsylvania, and won 3–0, while at Atlanta, Notre Dame beat Georgia Tech 12–0. Alabama defeated LSU, 24–0 and Tennessee won at Mississippi State, 33–0. Army won at Yale, 33–0 and Brown won at Dartmouth, 10–0. Ohio State won at the University of Chicago, 18–0., and Northwestern won its rematch with the Hoosiers at Indiana, 21–0. Kansas State went to 5–0–0 in beating Arkansas, 16–7.

== November ==
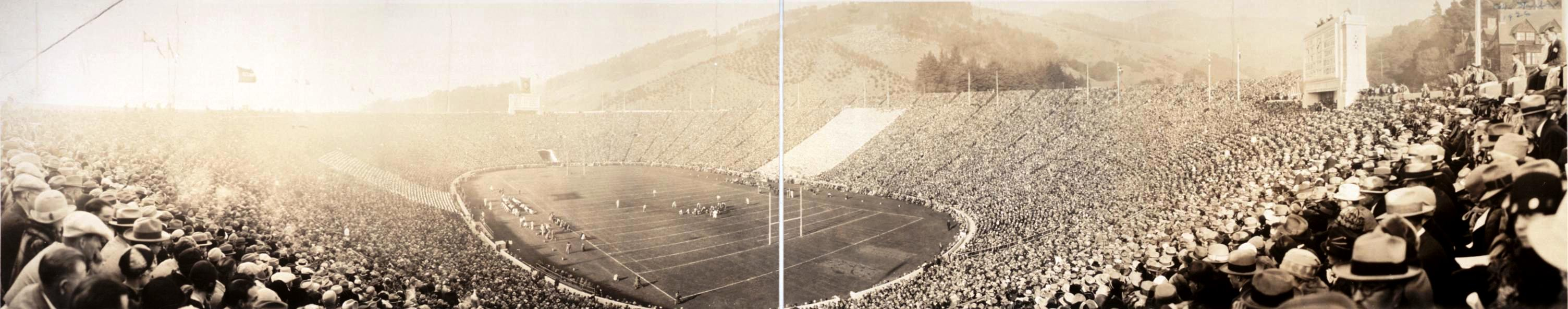
Photograph of the 1926 "Big Game" on November 20

November 6 Navy played an easy opponent in West Virginia Wesleyan College, winning 53–7. Army won its sixth straight, a 55–0 whitewash of Franklin & Marshall. Lafayette won again, beating Rutgers 37–0; Brown beat Norwich College, 27–0 and Pennsylvania beat Penn State, 3–0.

Alabama beat Kentucky 14–0 and Tennessee beat Sewanee 12–0. Stanford beat Santa Clara 33–14, while USC was idle. Michigan beat Wisconsin, 37–0, Northwestern beat Purdue 22–0, and Illinois won at Chicago 7–0. Ohio State defeated Wilmington, 13–7. Notre Dame won at Indiana, 26–0. In Milwaukee, Kansas State suffered its first defeat, losing to Marquette, 14–0.

On Armistice Day (November 11, USC (5–1–0) and Oregon State (4–0–0) played at Portland, Oregon. USC won 17–7.

November 13 In Yankee Stadium, Notre Dame and Army, both 6–0–0, faced off in another battle of powerhouses. The Fighting Irish handed the Cadets their first defeat, 7–0. In Columbus, Ohio State (6–0–0) hosted conference rival Michigan (5–1–0). The visitors won by a point, 17–16. Tennessee (7–0) and Vanderbilt (6–1) faced off in Nashville, and the Vols suffered their first defeat, 20–3. Stanford (8–0–0) hosted Washington State (7–1–0) in another big PCC game, and won, 29–10.

Northwestern, meanwhile, beat Chicago 38–7. Illinois defeated Wabash 27–13 Navy defeated Georgetown University, 10–7, and Lafayette recorded a fourth shutout, over Susquehanna, 68–0; Alabama beat Florida, 49–0; Kansas State lost again, at Nebraska, 3–0. Brown won at Harvard, 21–0 and Pennsylvania beat Columbia 3–0.

November 20 Navy played Loyola College of Baltimore, winning 35–13, and Army beat Ursinus, 21–15. Lafayette completed its season with a 35–0 win in its annual game against Lehigh Brown defeated New Hampshire, 40–12, to extend its record to 9–0–0.

Ohio State closed its season with a 7–6 win at Illinois, while Michigan recorded the same score in a rematch against the Gophers at Minnesota. Northwestern defeated Iowa, 13–6. All three schools finished 7–1–0, with Michigan and Northwestern being 5–0 in Western Conference play.

Notre Dame beat Drake, 21–0. Kansas State, after winning its first five, lost its next three, including a 3–2 defeat by visiting Iowa State; the Wildcats' final record was 5–3–0. USC defeated Idaho, 38–6. Stanford closed the regular season with its traditional finale against California. Though the Golden Bears had the home field, they were also having their first losing season since 1916, when their program began. California lost, 41–6.

On Thanksgiving Day, November 25, Alabama hosted Georgia winning 33–6, and USC crushed Montana, 61–0. Pennsylvania closed its season with a 10–10 tie with Cornell.

On November 27, Notre Dame was shocked by Carnegie Tech, 19–0. The 1926 Army-Navy game took place in Chicago. Navy, at 9–0–0, was unbeaten, while Army (7–1–0) had a single loss, to Notre Dame. The two teams played to a 21–21 tie. In Providence, Brown and Colgate tied, 10–10.

December 4 In Los Angeles, Notre Dame closed its season with a 13–12 win over USC.

At season's end, there were two "unbeaten and untied" teams, the Indians (later, "the Cardinal") of Leland Stanford University, and the Crimson Tide of the University of Alabama. Alabama, which had won the Rose Bowl the previous year, was invited to return to Pasadena to face Stanford's PCC champion team.

== Rose Bowl ==
United Press called the 1927 Rose Bowl "the football championship of America", and the game was considered the most exciting in the series up to that time. The crowd of 68,000 set an attendance record. Stanford's George Bogue missed an 18-yard field goal attempt in the first quarter, then threw a touchdown pass to Ed Walker and kicked the point after to put Stanford up, 7–0. Stanford held that lead through most of the rest of the game, but in the final minutes, they were forced to punt on fourth down. Frankie Wilton's kick was blocked, and Alabama took over 14 yards from goal. Four plays later, and with a minute left, Jimmy Johnson carried the ball for a touchdown, making it 7–6. The two-point conversion, and overtime, were decades in the future. Stanford's only hope was to block the point after, but Alabama ran the play quickly and Herschel Caldwell's kick tied Stanford, and took away a Stanford victory in the final minute.

== Conference standings ==
=== Major conference standings ===
1926 Big Ten Conference football standings
	Conf.					Overall
Team	W		L		T	W		L		T
No. 3 Michigan +	5	–	0	–	0	7	–	1	–	0
No. 10 Northwestern +	5	–	0	–	0	7	–	1	–	0
No. 8 Ohio State	3	–	1	–	0	7	–	1	–	0
Purdue	2	–	1	–	1	5	–	2	–	1
Wisconsin	3	–	2	–	1	5	–	2	–	1
No. 10 Illinois	2	–	2	–	0	6	–	2	–	0
Minnesota	2	–	2	–	0	5	–	3	–	0
Indiana	0	–	4	–	0	3	–	5	–	0
Iowa	0	–	5	–	0	3	–	5	–	0
Chicago	0	–	5	–	0	2	–	6	–	0
+ – Conference co-champions; Rankings from Dickinson System

1926 Rocky Mountain Conference football standings
	Conf.					Overall
Team	W		L		T	W		L		T
Utah $	5	–	0	–	0	7	–	0	–	0
Montana State *	4	–	0	–	0	4	–	2	–	1
Colorado College	5	–	2	–	0	5	–	2	–	0
Colorado Agricultural	5	–	2	–	0	6	–	2	–	1
Utah Agricultural	4	–	1	–	2	5	–	1	–	2
Colorado Teachers	3	–	3	–	0	6	–	4	–	0
Denver	4	–	4	–	0	4	–	4	–	0
Wyoming	1	–	2	–	2	2	–	4	–	2
Colorado	2	–	5	–	1	3	–	5	–	1
BYU	1	–	4	–	1	1	–	5	–	1
Colorado Mines	1	–	5	–	0	1	–	6	–	0
Western State (CO)	0	–	7	–	0	0	–	8	–	0
$ – Conference champion; * – Ineligible for conference title; played less than five conference games

1926 Missouri Valley Conference football standings
	Conf.					Overall
Team	W		L		T	W		L		T
Oklahoma A&M $	3	–	0	–	1	3	–	4	–	1
Nebraska	5	–	1	–	0	6	–	2	–	0
Missouri	4	–	1	–	0	5	–	1	–	2
Grinnell	3	–	1	–	1	6	–	1	–	1
Oklahoma	3	–	2	–	1	5	–	2	–	1
Kansas State	2	–	2	–	0	5	–	3	–	0
Iowa State	3	–	3	–	1	4	–	3	–	1
Drake	1	–	4	–	0	2	–	6	–	0
Kansas	1	–	5	–	0	2	–	6	–	0
Washington University	0	–	6	–	0	1	–	7	–	0
$ – Conference champion

1926 Southern Conference football standings
	Conf.					Overall
Team	W		L		T	W		L		T
No. 7 Alabama $	8	–	0	–	0	9	–	0	–	1
Tennessee	5	–	1	–	0	8	–	1	–	0
Vanderbilt	4	–	1	–	0	8	–	1	–	0
South Carolina	4	–	2	–	0	6	–	4	–	0
Georgia	4	–	2	–	0	5	–	4	–	0
Virginia	4	–	2	–	1	6	–	2	–	2
VPI	3	–	2	–	1	5	–	3	–	1
Washington and Lee	3	–	2	–	1	4	–	3	–	2
Georgia Tech	4	–	3	–	0	4	–	5	–	0
North Carolina	3	–	3	–	0	4	–	5	–	0
Auburn	3	–	3	–	0	5	–	4	–	0
LSU	3	–	3	–	0	6	–	3	–	0
Ole Miss	2	–	2	–	0	5	–	4	–	0
Mississippi A&M	2	–	3	–	0	5	–	4	–	0
VMI	2	–	4	–	0	5	–	5	–	0
Tulane	2	–	4	–	0	3	–	5	–	1
Maryland	1	–	3	–	1	5	–	4	–	1
Clemson	1	–	3	–	0	2	–	7	–	0
Florida	1	–	4	–	1	2	–	6	–	2
Kentucky	1	–	4	–	1	2	–	6	–	1
NC State	0	–	4	–	0	4	–	6	–	0
Sewanee	0	–	5	–	0	2	–	6	–	0
$ – Conference champion; Rankings from Dickinson System

1926 Pacific Coast Conference football standings
	Conf.					Overall
Team	W		L		T	W		L		T
No. 1 Stanford $	4	–	0	–	0	10	–	0	–	1
No. 6 USC	5	–	1	–	0	8	–	2	–	0
Oregon Agricultural	4	–	1	–	0	7	–	1	–	0
Washington State	4	–	1	–	0	6	–	1	–	0
Washington	3	–	2	–	0	8	–	2	–	0
Oregon	1	–	4	–	0	2	–	4	–	1
Idaho	1	–	4	–	0	3	–	4	–	1
Montana	0	–	4	–	0	3	–	5	–	0
California	0	–	5	–	0	3	–	6	–	0
$ – Conference champion; Rankings from Dickinson System

1926 Southwest Conference football standings
	Conf.					Overall
Team	W		L		T	W		L		T
SMU $	5	–	0	–	0	8	–	0	–	1
Baylor	3	–	1	–	1	6	–	3	–	1
TCU	1	–	1	–	2	6	–	1	–	2
Texas	2	–	2	–	0	5	–	4	–	0
Arkansas	2	–	2	–	0	5	–	5	–	0
Texas A&M	1	–	3	–	1	5	–	3	–	1
Rice	0	–	4	–	0	4	–	4	–	1
$ – Conference champion; Arkansas's games against Ole Miss, Centenary, and LSU counted in the conference standings.

=== Independents ===
1926 Eastern college football independents records
	Conf.			Overall
Team	W	L	T	W		L		T
No. 5 Lafayette		–		9	–	0	–	0
No. 10 Brown		–		9	–	0	–	1
NYU		–		8	–	1	–	0
No. 9 Army		–		7	–	1	–	1
Washington & Jefferson		–		7	–	1	–	1
Boston College		–		6	–	0	–	2
No. 10 Penn		–		7	–	1	–	1
Cornell		–		6	–	1	–	1
Princeton		–		5	–	1	–	1
Carnegie Tech		–		7	–	2	–	0
Springfield		–		6	–	2	–	0
Syracuse		–		7	–	2	–	1
Villanova		–		6	–	2	–	1
Colgate		–		5	–	2	–	2
Columbia		–		6	–	3	–	0
Pittsburgh		–		5	–	2	–	2
CCNY		–		5	–	3	–	0
Temple		–		5	–	3	–	0
Penn State		–		5	–	4	–	0
Tufts		–		4	–	4	–	0
Yale		–		4	–	4	–	0
Bucknell		–		4	–	5	–	1
Fordham		–		3	–	4	–	1
Harvard		–		3	–	5	–	0
Rutgers		–		3	–	6	–	0
Vermont		–		3	–	6	–	0
Drexel		–		2	–	5	–	0
Boston University		–		2	–	6	–	0
Lehigh		–		1	–	8	–	0
Franklin & Marshall		–		0	–	8	–	1
Rankings from Dickinson System

1926 Midwestern college football independents records
	Conf.			Overall
Team	W	L	T	W		L		T
Haskell		–		12	–	0	–	1
No. 3 Notre Dame		–		9	–	1	–	0
Western State Normal		–		7	–	1	–	0
Michigan State Normal		–		6	–	1	–	0
Muncie Normal		–		5	–	1	–	1
Northern Illinois State		–		5	–	1	–	1
Marquette		–		6	–	3	–	0
Lombard		–		5	–	3	–	0
Loyola (IL)		–		4	–	3	–	0
Central Michigan		–		3	–	4	–	1
Michigan State		–		3	–	4	–	1
Detroit		–		3	–	6	–	1
Butler		–		3	–	6	–	0
Saint Louis		–		3	–	6	–	0
John Carroll		–		2	–	5	–	1
Kent State		–		2	–	6	–	0
Valparaiso		–		1	–	4	–	1
Michigan Mines		–		0	–	2	–	1
Rankings from Dickinson System

1926 Southern college football independents records
	Conf.			Overall
Team	W	L	T	W		L		T
Loyola (LA)		–		10	–	0	–	0
Miami (FL)		–		8	–	0	–	0
Howard		–		7	–	0	–	0
Delaware State		–		1	–	0	–	0
No. 2 Navy		–		9	–	0	–	1
Wesley		–		6	–	1	–	0
Texas Tech		–		6	–	1	–	3
Davidson		–		7	–	2	–	1
Georgetown		–		7	–	2	–	1
William & Mary		–		7	–	3	–	0
Georgia Normal		–		5	–	3	–	1
Hampden–Sydney		–		5	–	2	–	3
George Washington		–		5	–	4	–	0
Middle Tennessee State Teachers		–		4	–	2	–	1
Spring Hill		–		3	–	2	–	1
Texas A&I		–		4	–	3	–	0
Wake Forest		–		5	–	4	–	1
Texas Mines		–		3	–	4	–	0
Mississippi State Teachers		–		3	–	4	–	1
Tennessee Docs		–		3	–	5	–	1
Catholic University		–		3	–	5	–	0
Delaware		–		3	–	5	–	0
East Tennessee State Teachers		–		2	–	4	–	1
Duke		–		3	–	6	–	0
Richmond		–		2	–	7	–	0
Harding		–		1	–	5	–	0
West Tennessee State Teachers		–		1	–	8	–	0
Rankings from Dickinson System

1926 Western college football independents records
	Conf.			Overall
Team	W	L	T	W		L		T
Loyola (CA)		–		6	–	0	–	2
Arizona		–		5	–	1	–	1
Regis		–		6	–	2	–	0
Tempe State		–		4	–	1	–	1
Gonzaga		–		5	–	2	–	1
New Mexico		–		4	–	2	–	1
New Mexico A&M		–		5	–	3	–	1
Hawaii		–		5	–	4	–	0
Santa Clara		–		5	–	4	–	0
St. Ignatius (CA)		–		2	–	3	–	3
Santa Barbara State		–		2	–	4	–	0

=== Minor conferences ===
Conference	Champion(s)	Record
Central Intercollegiate Athletics Association	Hampton Institute	6–0–1
Far Western Conference	Saint Mary's (CA)	4–0
Inter-Normal Athletic Conference of Wisconsin	River Falls Normal	4–0
Iowa Intercollegiate Athletic Conference	Parsons	6–0–1
Kansas Collegiate Athletic Conference	Kansas State Normal	7–0
Michigan Intercollegiate Athletic Association	Alma	4–0
Midwest Collegiate Athletic Conference	Carleton	3–0
Minnesota Intercollegiate Athletic Conference	Gustavus Adolphus	6–0
Missouri Intercollegiate Athletic Association	Central Missouri State Teachers	4–0
North Central Intercollegiate Conference	South Dakota State College	3–0–2
Nebraska Intercollegiate Conference	Nebraska State Teachers–Chadron	6–0
Ohio Athletic Conference	Muskingum	7–0
Oklahoma Intercollegiate Conference	Southwestern State Teachers	5–0
Pacific Northwest Conference	College of Idaho	2–0
South Dakota Intercollegiate Conference	Columbus College; Dakota Wesleyan	4–0; 5–0
Southern California Intercollegiate Athletic Conference	Pomona	5–2
Southern Intercollegiate Athletic Conference	Tuskegee	8–0
Southwestern Athletic Conference	Samuel Huston	5–0
Texas Collegiate Athletic Conference	Simmons (TX)	2–0–1
Texas Intercollegiate Athletic Association	Daniel Baker	4–0
Tri-Normal League	State Normal–Ellensburg	2–0

=== Minor conference standings ===
1926 Buckeye Athletic Association football standings
	Conf.					Overall
Team	W		L		T	W		L		T
Ohio Wesleyan $	3	–	0	–	1	6	–	2	–	1
Wittenberg	3	–	1	–	0	6	–	2	–	0
Ohio	2	–	1	–	1	5	–	2	–	1
Miami (OH)	1	–	2	–	1	5	–	2	–	1
Denison	1	–	3	–	0	2	–	6	–	1
Cincinnati	0	–	3	–	1	3	–	5	–	1
$ – Conference champion

1926 California Coast Conference football standings
	Conf.					Overall
Team	W		L		T	W		L		T
Chico State $	5	–	0	–	1	5	–	2	–	1
Sacramento	4	–	1	–	1	?	–	?	–	?
San Mateo	3	–	1	–	0	0	–	0	–	0
Modesto	2	–	3	–	1	2	–	3	–	1
Cal Poly	1	–	3	–	0	5	–	4	–	0
Santa Rosa	1	–	4	–	0	?	–	?	–	?
San Jose State	0	–	5	–	1	1	–	6	–	1
$ – Conference champion

1926 Colored Intercollegiate Athletic Association football standings
	Conf.					Overall
Team	W		L		T	W		L		T
Hampton $	6	–	0	–	1	7	–	0	–	1
Virginia Union	6	–	1	–	0	6	–	1	–	0
North Carolina A&T	5	–	2	–	0	7	–	2	–	0
Virginia Seminary	3	–	3	–	1	3	–	4	–	1
Saint Paul (VA)	2	–	4	–	1	3	–	5	–	1
Virginia Normal	3	–	4	–	0	4	–	4	–	0
Johnson C. Smith	1	–	5	–	1	2	–	6	–	1
Shaw	0	–	7	–	0	1	–	7	–	1
$ – Conference champion

1926 Far Western Conference football standings
	Conf.					Overall
Team	W		L		T	W		L		T
Saint Mary's $	4	–	0	–	0	9	–	0	–	1
Nevada	3	–	1	–	0	4	–	4	–	0
Fresno State	1	–	2	–	1	5	–	3	–	1
Pacific (CA)	1	–	2	–	1	5	–	3	–	1
Cal Aggies	0	–	4	–	0	2	–	6	–	1
$ – Conference champion

1926 Illinois Intercollegiate Athletic Conference football standings
	Conf.					Overall
Team	W		L		T	W		L		T
Bradley +	5	–	0	–	0	9	–	0	–	0
Monmouth (IL) +	5	–	0	–	0	7	–	1	–	0
Lake Forest	1	–	0	–	0	2	–	3	–	3
Illinois College	6	–	2	–	0	6	–	2	–	0
Millikin	6	–	2	–	0	6	–	2	–	0
Shurtleff	6	–	2	–	0	6	–	2	–	0
Augustana (IL)	4	–	2	–	1	5	–	2	–	1
North Central	3	–	2	–	0	5	–	4	–	0
Western Illinois	4	–	3	–	0	4	–	3	–	1
Southern Illinois	1	–	1	–	1	5	–	1	–	2
Illinois State Normal	4	–	4	–	0	4	–	4	–	0
Illinois Wesleyan	3	–	3	–	0	3	–	3	–	1
Carthage	2	–	3	–	1	3	–	3	–	2
Eastern Illinois	2	–	3	–	0	3	–	5	–	1
St. Viator	1	–	2	–	0	3	–	5	–	0
Knox (IL)	1	–	3	–	1	2	–	5	–	1
McKendree	1	–	3	–	1	1	–	6	–	1
Lincoln (IL)	1	–	6	–	0	2	–	6	–	0
Wheaton (IL)	0	–	3	–	1	0	–	6	–	1
Mount Morris	0	–	5	–	1	0	–	6	–	1
Eureka	0	–	6	–	1	0	–	6	–	1
+ – Conference co-champions

1926 Iowa Conference football standings
	Conf.					Overall
Team	W		L		T	W		L		T
Parsons $	5	–	0	–	1	6	–	1	–	1
Morningside	3	–	0	–	0	6	–	2	–	0
Simpson (IA)	3	–	1	–	1	4	–	3	–	1
Iowa State Teachers	4	–	2	–	0	5	–	3	–	0
Ellsworth	2	–	1	–	2	2	–	1	–	2
St. Ambrose	3	–	2	–	0	4	–	3	–	0
Central (IA)	2	–	2	–	0	3	–	3	–	1
Penn (IA)	3	–	3	–	0	3	–	4	–	0
Upper Iowa	2	–	3	–	1	2	–	3	–	1
Luther	1	–	2	–	0	4	–	4	–	0
Western Union	1	–	3	–	0	4	–	4	–	0
Iowa Wesleyan	1	–	3	–	0	2	–	4	–	1
Des Moines	1	–	4	–	0	2	–	7	–	0
Buena Vista	0	–	5	–	1	0	–	7	–	1
$ – Conference champion

1926 Kansas Collegiate Athletic Conference football standings
	Conf.					Overall
Team	W		L		T	W		L		T
Emporia Teachers $	7	–	0	–	0	7	–	0	–	0
College of Emporia	6	–	1	–	0	7	–	1	–	0
Bethany (KS)	6	–	1	–	0	6	–	2	–	0
Wichita	5	–	1	–	0	6	–	2	–	0
Ottawa	5	–	2	–	0	5	–	2	–	1
Friends	4	–	2	–	0	4	–	2	–	1
Sterling	4	–	3	–	0	4	–	3	–	0
Washburn	3	–	3	–	1	3	–	4	–	1
Kansas Wesleyan	3	–	4	–	0	4	–	4	–	0
Baker	2	–	3	–	2	3	–	3	–	2
McPherson	2	–	4	–	0	3	–	4	–	1
Hays Teachers	2	–	5	–	0	3	–	5	–	0
Pittsburg Teachers	2	–	5	–	0	2	–	6	–	0
St. Mary's (KS)	2	–	5	–	0	2	–	5	–	0
St. Benedict's	0	–	2	–	1	1	–	6	–	1
Southwestern (KS)	0	–	6	–	0	2	–	6	–	0
Bethel (KS)	0	–	6	–	0	0	–	7	–	0
$ – Conference champion

1926 Michigan Intercollegiate Athletic Association football standings
	Conf.					Overall
Team	W		L		T	W		L		T
Alma $	4	–	0	–	0	6	–	2	–	0
Hillsdale	2	–	2	–	0	5	–	2	–	1
Kalamazoo	2	–	2	–	0	3	–	4	–	1
Albion	1	–	3	–	0	4	–	5	–	0
Olivet	1	–	3	–	0	1	–	5	–	1
$ – Conference champion

1926 Midwest Conference football standings
	Conf.					Overall
Team	W		L		T	W		L		T
Carleton $	3	–	0	–	0	6	–	1	–	0
Coe	5	–	1	–	0	6	–	2	–	0
Monmouth (IL)	2	–	1	–	0	7	–	1	–	0
Lawrence	1	–	1	–	1	3	–	2	–	2
Hamline	1	–	1	–	0	4	–	4	–	0
Cornell (IA)	3	–	3	–	0	3	–	4	–	0
Ripon	1	–	2	–	1	2	–	3	–	2
Knox	1	–	2	–	0	2	–	5	–	1
Beloit	0	–	6	–	0	0	–	7	–	0
$ – Conference champion

1926 Minnesota Intercollegiate Athletic Conference football standings
	Conf.					Overall
Team	W		L		T	W		L		T
Gustavus Adolphus $	6	–	0	–	0	7	–	0	–	0
Macalester	3	–	1	–	0	5	–	3	–	0
Hamline	3	–	2	–	0	4	–	4	–	0
St. Olaf	2	–	3	–	0	2	–	5	–	0
Saint John's (MN)	1	–	3	–	1	2	–	4	–	1
Augsburg	1	–	3	–	1	1	–	3	–	1
Concordia (MN)	0	–	4	–	0	0	–	7	–	0
$ – Conference champion

1926 Missouri College Athletic Union football standings
	Conf.					Overall
Team	W		L		T	W		L		T
Westminster (MO) $	7	–	0	–	0	7	–	1	–	0
Missouri Mines	1	–	0	–	0	5	–	3	–	0
Central (MO)	5	–	1	–	0	5	–	2	–	0
Missouri Valley	4	–	2	–	0	5	–	2	–	0
William Jewell	4	–	3	–	0	4	–	4	–	0
Missouri Wesleyan	2	–	4	–	0	2	–	6	–	1
Culver–Stockton	1	–	3	–	0	1	–	8	–	1
Drury	0	–	3	–	1	0	–	6	–	1
Central Wesleyan	0	–	5	–	1	2	–	5	–	1
Tarkio	0	–	3	–	0	0	–	6	–	0
$ – Conference champion

1926 Missouri Intercollegiate Athletic Association football standings
	Conf.					Overall
Team	W		L		T	W		L		T
Warrensburg $	4	–	0	–	0	7	–	0	–	1
Kirksville	3	–	1	–	0	7	–	1	–	0
Maryville (MO)	2	–	2	–	0	6	–	2	–	0
Springfield (MO)	1	–	3	–	0	3	–	5	–	0
Cape Girardeau	0	–	4	–	0	0	–	6	–	1
$ – Conference champion

1926 Nebraska College Athletic Conference football standings
	Conf.					Overall
Team	W		L		T	W		L		T
Chadron Normal $	6	–	0	–	0	6	–	4	–	0
Peru Normal	5	–	1	–	1	7	–	1	–	1
Nebraska Wesleyan	4	–	1	–	0	6	–	4	–	0
Nebraska Central	3	–	1	–	2	?	–	?	–	?
Doane	5	–	2	–	1	5	–	2	–	2
Midland	4	–	3	–	0	5	–	4	–	0
Hastings	4	–	3	–	0	4	–	4	–	0
Wayne Normal	2	–	3	–	0	3	–	5	–	0
Kearney Normal	2	–	3	–	1	2	–	6	–	1
York (NE)	2	–	4	–	2	2	–	4	–	2
Grand Island	2	–	4	–	1	2	–	5	–	1
Omaha	0	–	5	–	0	2	–	5	–	0
Cotner	0	–	9	–	0	0	–	9	–	0
$ – Conference champion

1926 New England Conference football standings
	Conf.					Overall
Team	W		L		T	W		L		T
Connecticut $	3	–	1	–	0	7	–	1	–	0
Maine	2	–	1	–	0	7	–	1	–	0
New Hampshire	2	–	1	–	0	4	–	4	–	0
Massachusetts	0	–	1	–	0	1	–	6	–	0
Rhode Island State	0	–	3	–	0	1	–	6	–	0
$ – Conference champion

1926 New York State Conference football standings
	Conf.					Overall
Team	W		L		T	W		L		T
Niagara $	2	–	0	–	1	4	–	3	–	1
Hobart	4	–	1	–	0	6	–	3	–	0
Clarkson	3	–	1	–	1	4	–	3	–	1
St. Lawrence	2	–	1	–	0	4	–	2	–	1
Rochester	2	–	2	–	1	3	–	5	–	1
St. Bonaventure	1	–	1	–	0	3	–	5	–	0
Hamilton	1	–	1	–	0	2	–	6	–	0
Alfred	1	–	4	–	1	1	–	6	–	2
Buffalo	0	–	5	–	0	0	–	8	–	0
$ – Conference champion

1926 North Central Conference football standings
	Conf.					Overall
Team	W		L		T	W		L		T
South Dakota State $	3	–	0	–	2	8	–	1	–	3
South Dakota	3	–	1	–	1	5	–	3	–	1
Morningside	2	–	1	–	0	6	–	2	–	0
Creighton	2	–	2	–	1	4	–	4	–	1
North Dakota	3	–	2	–	0	4	–	4	–	0
North Dakota Agricultural	2	–	3	–	0	5	–	3	–	0
Des Moines	1	–	4	–	0	2	–	7	–	0
Nebraska Wesleyan	0	–	3	–	0	6	–	4	–	0
$ – Conference champion

1926 Northwest Conference football standings
	Conf.					Overall
Team	W		L		T	W		L		T
College of Idaho $	2	–	0	–	0	6	–	2	–	0
Puget Sound	2	–	1	–	0	3	–	3	–	0
Pacific (OR)	2	–	2	–	1	2	–	2	–	2
Whitman	1	–	1	–	1	2	–	4	–	1
Willamette	1	–	2	–	0	2	–	4	–	0
Linfield	0	–	2	–	0	5	–	2	–	1
$ – Conference champion

1926 Northwest Ohio League football standings
	Conf.					Overall
Team	W		L		T	W		L		T
Findlay $	3	–	1	–	0	5	–	5	–	1
Bowling Green	2	–	1	–	0	4	–	3	–	1
Bluffton	2	–	2	–	0	3	–	3	–	0
Toledo	1	–	2	–	0	3	–	5	–	0
Defiance	1	–	3	–	0	3	–	6	–	0
$ – Conference champion

1926 Ohio Athletic Conference football standings
	Conf.					Overall
Team	W		L		T	W		L		T
Muskingum $	7	–	0	–	0	9	–	0	–	0
Dayton	3	–	0	–	0	8	–	2	–	0
St. Xavier	1	–	0	–	0	9	–	1	–	0
Oberlin	6	–	1	–	0	6	–	1	–	0
Wittenberg	4	–	1	–	0	6	–	2	–	0
Ohio Wesleyan	5	–	1	–	1	6	–	2	–	1
Wooster	5	–	2	–	0	6	–	2	–	0
Miami (OH)	4	–	2	–	1	5	–	2	–	1
Ohio	4	–	2	–	1	5	–	2	–	1
Akron	4	–	2	–	2	5	–	2	–	2
Mount Union	5	–	3	–	0	6	–	3	–	0
Case	4	–	2	–	3	4	–	2	–	3
Baldwin–Wallace	3	–	3	–	2	3	–	3	–	2
Western Reserve	3	–	4	–	1	3	–	4	–	1
Heidelberg	2	–	4	–	0	3	–	4	–	0
Cincinnati	2	–	5	–	1	3	–	5	–	1
Denison	2	–	6	–	0	2	–	6	–	1
Otterbein	1	–	5	–	0	2	–	5	–	0
Ohio Northern	1	–	6	–	0	1	–	6	–	0
Kenyon	1	–	6	–	0	1	–	7	–	0
Marietta	1	–	6	–	0	1	–	7	–	0
Hiram	0	–	7	–	0	0	–	7	–	0
$ – Conference champion

1926 Oklahoma Intercollegiate Conference football standings
	Conf.					Overall
Team	W		L		T	W		L		T
Southwestern State $	5	–	0	–	0	7	–	2	–	0
Tulsa	5	–	1	–	0	7	–	2	–	0
Oklahoma Baptist	4	–	1	–	1	6	–	1	–	1
Northeastern State	3	–	3	–	0	4	–	5	–	0
Southeastern Oklahoma State	3	–	3	–	0	4	–	5	–	0
Central State Teachers	2	–	2	–	2	3	–	3	–	3
Oklahoma City	3	–	4	–	1	5	–	4	–	1
Phillips	2	–	3	–	1	2	–	5	–	1
Northwestern Oklahoma State	0	–	5	–	1	2	–	5	–	2
East Central	0	–	5	–	0	2	–	7	–	0
$ – Conference champion

1926 South Dakota Intercollegiate Conference football standings
	Conf.					Overall
Team	W		L		T	W		L		T
Dakota Wesleyan +	5	–	0	–	0	6	–	1	–	0
Columbus (SD) +	4	–	0	–	0	4	–	2	–	1
South Dakota Mines	3	–	0	–	0	4	–	1	–	1
Southern Normal	4	–	1	–	1	5	–	2	–	1
Northern Normal	3	–	1	–	0	5	–	1	–	0
Yankton	2	–	2	–	1	3	–	3	–	1
Eastern Normal	3	–	4	–	0	3	–	4	–	1
Huron	2	–	3	–	0	2	–	5	–	0
Augustana (SD)	1	–	6	–	0	1	–	7	–	0
Spearfish	0	–	4	–	0	3	–	5	–	1
Sioux Falls	0	–	6	–	0	0	–	6	–	0
+ – Conference co-champions; Spearfish and South Dakota Mines played twice. The second game was not counted in the conference standings. South Dakota Mines did not play enough conference games to qualify for the championship.

1926 Southern California Conference football standings
	Conf.					Overall
Team	W		L		T	W		L		T
Pomona $	5	–	2	–	0	5	–	2	–	0
Southern Branch	4	–	2	–	0	5	–	3	–	0
Whittier	4	–	2	–	1	4	–	4	–	1
Occidental	3	–	2	–	0	4	–	4	–	1
Caltech	3	–	2	–	0	4	–	3	–	1
La Verne	1	–	1	–	2	2	–	2	–	2
San Diego State	1	–	3	–	1	3	–	4	–	1
Redlands	0	–	7	–	0	0	–	9	–	0
$ – Conference champion

1926 Southern Intercollegiate Athletic Association football standings
	Conf.					Overall
Team	W		L		T	W		L		T
Centenary +	5	–	0	–	0	5	–	3	–	0
Chattanooga +	4	–	0	–	2	6	–	2	–	2
Presbyterian	5	–	1	–	0	7	–	2	–	0
Furman	3	–	1	–	1	8	–	1	–	1
Stetson	3	–	1	–	0	5	–	1	–	1
Georgetown (KY)	3	–	1	–	1	6	–	2	–	1
Louisiana Tech	3	–	1	–	0	5	–	2	–	2
Birmingham–Southern	3	–	1	–	2	5	–	3	–	2
Mercer	3	–	1	–	1	4	–	3	–	2
Mississippi College	5	–	2	–	0	6	–	3	–	0
Louisville	2	–	1	–	0	6	–	2	–	0
Centre	2	–	1	–	2	3	–	4	–	2
The Citadel	5	–	3	–	0	7	–	3	–	0
SW Louisiana	2	–	2	–	0	6	–	3	–	1
Transylvania	1	–	1	–	0	4	–	3	–	0
Southern College	2	–	2	–	0	4	–	4	–	0
Oglethorpe	3	–	4	–	1	3	–	7	–	1
Howard (AL)	2	–	3	–	1	4	–	4	–	1
Western Kentucky State Normal	1	–	2	–	1	4	–	4	–	1
Newberry	2	–	4	–	0	2	–	5	–	0
Millsaps	2	–	6	–	0	2	–	8	–	0
Wofford	1	–	3	–	0	2	–	8	–	0
Union (TN)	1	–	4	–	0	3	–	6	–	0
Louisiana College	0	–	4	–	0	3	–	5	–	0
Kentucky Wesleyan	0	–	4	–	0	3	–	6	–	0
Erskine	0	–	4	–	0	1	–	7	–	0
Rollins	0	–	4	–	0	0	–	6	–	0
+ – Conference co-champions

1926 Southern Intercollegiate Athletic Conference football standings
	Conf.					Overall
Team	W		L		T	W		L		T
Tuskegee $	8	–	0	–	0	10	–	0	–	0
Morris Brown	2	–	0	–	1	3	–	2	–	1
Talladega	3	–	2	–	0	4	–	2	–	0
Atlanta	4	–	3	–	1	4	–	4	–	1
Florida A&M	1	–	1	–	0	2	–	2	–	0
Alabama State	2	–	3	–	0	6	–	3	–	0
Knoxville	2	–	3	–	0	5	–	3	–	0
Clark (GA)	2	–	3	–	0	2	–	3	–	1
Morehouse	1	–	4	–	1	2	–	5	–	1
Tennessee State	0	–	2	–	2	2	–	2	–	2
Fisk	0	–	4	–	1	2	–	5	–	1
$ – Conference champion

1926 Southwestern Athletic Conference football standings
	Conf.					Overall
Team	W		L		T	W		L		T
Samuel Huston $	5	–	0	–	0	7	–	0	–	0
Prairie View	3	–	1	–	1	5	–	2	–	1
Wiley	3	–	2	–	0	5	–	3	–	1
Paul Quinn	2	–	2	–	1	?	–	?	–	?
Bishop	1	–	4	–	0	?	–	?	–	?
Texas College	0	–	5	–	0	?	–	?	–	?
$ – Conference champion

1926 Texas Conference football standings
	Conf.					Overall
Team	W		L		T	W		L		T
Simmons (TX) $	2	–	0	–	1	6	–	3	–	1
Howard Payne	3	–	1	–	0	4	–	4	–	1
Trinity (TX)	2	–	1	–	1	3	–	5	–	2
Austin	1	–	2	–	0	4	–	5	–	0
Southwestern (TX)	0	–	4	–	0	0	–	9	–	0
$ – Conference champion

1926 Texas Intercollegiate Athletic Association football standings
	Conf.					Overall
Team	W		L		T	W		L		T
Daniel Baker $	4	–	0	–	0	7	–	2	–	1
North Texas State Teachers	4	–	1	–	0	5	–	3	–	1
Southwest Texas State	4	–	1	–	0	7	–	2	–	0
Sam Houston State	4	–	1	–	0	5	–	3	–	1
Abilene Christian	2	–	2	–	0	4	–	4	–	0
McMurry	1	–	2	–	0	1	–	9	–	0
Stephen F. Austin	1	–	3	–	0	5	–	5	–	0
St. Edward's	0	–	2	–	0	4	–	6	–	0
West Texas State	0	–	4	–	0	2	–	6	–	0
East Texas State	0	–	5	–	0	0	–	7	–	0
$ – Conference champion

1926 West Virginia Athletic Conference football standings
	Conf.					Overall
Team	W		L		T	W		L		T
West Virginia Wesleyan $	4	–	1	–	0	4	–	6	–	0
Marshall	3	–	1	–	0	5	–	4	–	1
Concord	3	–	1	–	0	6	–	1	–	1
Salem	5	–	2	–	0	5	–	2	–	0
Davis & Elkins	3	–	2	–	0	4	–	4	–	0
Glenville State	3	–	2	–	0	3	–	2	–	0
Potomac State	2	–	2	–	0	3	–	2	–	0
Broaddus	2	–	3	–	0	2	–	4	–	0
New River State	1	–	3	–	0	2	–	3	–	0
Fairmont State	1	–	6	–	0	1	–	6	–	0
West Virginia *	2	–	0	–	0	6	–	4	–	0
West Liberty State *	2	–	0	–	0	6	–	3	–	0
Bethany (WV) *	0	–	3	–	0	2	–	5	–	2
Morris Harvey *	0	–	3	–	0	3	–	6	–	0
Shepherd *	0	–	3	–	0	2	–	4	–	0
$ – Conference champion; * – Did not qualify for conference standings Ties did not count in conference standings.

1926 Wisconsin State Teachers College Conference football standings
	Conf.					Overall
Team	W		L		T	W		L		T
River Falls State $	4	–	0	–	0	5	–	1	–	0
Milwaukee State	3	–	0	–	1	5	–	0	–	2
La Crosse State	2	–	0	–	2	3	–	2	–	2
Oshkosh State	2	–	1	–	1	3	–	3	–	1
Superior State	2	–	1	–	1	4	–	2	–	2
Whitewater State	2	–	2	–	0	4	–	2	–	0
Stevens Point State	1	–	3	–	0	1	–	3	–	0
Eau Claire State	0	–	2	–	2	1	–	3	–	2
Stout Institute	0	–	3	–	1	2	–	4	–	1
Platteville State	0	–	4	–	0	1	–	6	–	0
$ – Conference champion

== Rankings ==
=== Champions (per rankings) ===
Various different rankings (using differing methodologies) have identified Alabama, Stanford, Navy, and Michigan as the season's champion.

- Berryman QPRS: Alabama
- Billingsley Report: Alabama
- Boand System: Navy
- College Football Researchers Association: Alabama and Stanford
- Parke H. Davis (Note: for Spalding's Official Foot Ball Guide): Lafayette
- Dickinson System: Stanford
- Helms Athletic Foundation: Alabama and Stanford
- Houlgate System: Navy
- National Championship Foundation: Alabama
- Poling System: Alabama
- Sagarin Ratings Elo chess method: Stanford
- Sagarin Ratings Predictor method: Michigan

Note: besides the Dickinson System, all 1926 rankings were given retroactively

=== Dickinson System ===
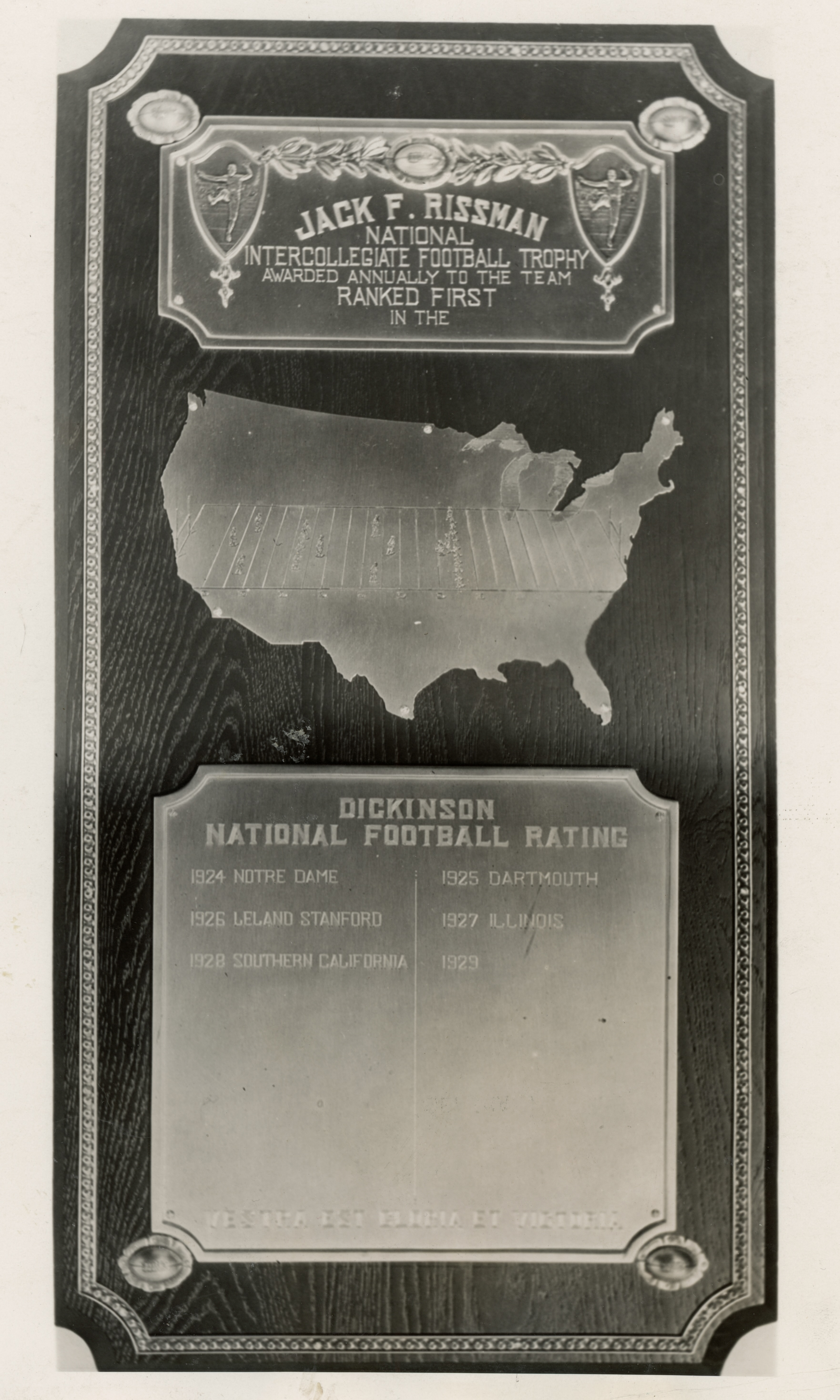
Jack F. Rissman National Intercollegiate Football Trophy — Awarded annually to the team ranked first in the Dickinson National Football Rating

Frank G. Dickinson, an economics professor at the University of Illinois, had invented the Dickinson System to rank colleges based upon their records and the strength of their opposition. The system was originally designed to rank teams in the Big Nine (later the Big Ten) conference. Chicago clothing manufacturer Jack Rissman then persuaded Dickinson to rank the nation's teams under the system, and awarded the Rissman Trophy to the winning university.

Although Dickinson had applied the system to the 1924 and 1925 seasons, 1926 was the first year in which the Rissman Trophy was awarded at season's end. The system awarded 30 points for a win over a "strong team", and 20 for a win over a "weak team". Losses were awarded points (15 for loss to a strong team, 10 for loss to a weak team). Ties were treated as half a win and half a loss (22.5 for a tie with a strong team, 15 for a tie with a weak team). An average was then derived by dividing the points by games played.

Professor Dickinson's rating metrics were unfavorable to Alabama, which won all nine of its regular season games, but were given an average rating of 16.67, less than the average for wins over weak (20.00 point) contenders. Alabama was the only Southern team in the 1926 rankings.

Rank	Team	Record	Rating
1	Stanford	10–0-1	22.50
2	Navy	9–0–1	21.83
3 (t)	Michigan	7–1	21.25
3 (t)	Notre Dame	9–1	21.25
5	Lafayette	9–0	20.00
6	USC	8–2	17.70
7	Alabama	9–0–1	16.67
8	Ohio State	7–1	16.25
9	Army	7–1–1	14.38
10	Brown	9–0–1	13.76
11 (t)	Illinois	6–2	13.75
11 (t)	Northwestern	7–1	13.75
11 (t)	Penn	7–1–1	13.75

=== Retroactive rankings ===
In later retroactive ratings, Stanford was chosen as a co-national champion along with Alabama by the Helms Athletic Foundation, National Championship Foundation, and Jeff Sagarin (using the ELO-Chess methodology). Alabama was found to be the lone champion in retroactive rankings by Berryman QPRS, Billingsley Report, College Football Researchers Association, and the Poling System. The Boand and Houlgate Systems retroactively named Navy as the national champions. In 1934, Parke H. Davis, a renowned football historian and football rules committee member, declared Lafayette (9–0), where he had previously coached, the 1926 "National Champion Foot Ball Team" in Spalding's Official Foot Ball Guide. Jeff Sagarin's predictor method retroactively ranked Michigan to be the national champion.

== Awards and honors ==
=== All-Americans ===
The consensus All-America team included:

Position	Name	Height	Weight (lbs.)	Class	Hometown	Team
QB	Benny Friedman	5'8"	172	Sr.	Cleveland, Ohio	Michigan
HB	Mort Kaer	5'11"	167	Sr.	Omaha, Nebraska	USC
HB	Moon Baker	5'10"	172	Sr.	Rockford, Illinois	Northwestern
FB	Herb Joesting	6'1"	192	Jr.	Owatonna, Minnesota	Minnesota
E	Bennie Oosterbaan	6'0"	180	Jr.	Muskegon, Michigan	Michigan
T	Frank Wickhorst	6'0"	218	Sr.	Aurora, Illinois	Navy
G	Bernie Shively	6'4"	208	Sr.	Paris, Illinois	Illinois
C	Bud Boeringer	6'1"	186	Sr.		Notre Dame
G	Harry Connaughton	6'4"	250	Sr.	Philadelphia	Georgetown
T	Bud Sprague	6'2"	210	So.	Dallas, Texas	Army
E	Vic Hanson	5'10"	174	Sr.	Syracuse, New York	Syracuse

=== Statistical leaders ===
- Team scoring most points: Haskell, 558
- Player scoring most points: Fred Koster, Louisville, 124, or Mayes McClain, Haskell, 253
- Total offense leader: Gibby Welch, Pitt
