= 1926 Dartmouth Indians football team =

American college football season

1926 Dartmouth Indians football
- Conference: Independent
- Record: 4–4
- Head coach: Jesse Hawley (4th season)
- Captain: Newman Horton
- Home stadium: Memorial Field

1926 Eastern college football independents records
	Conf.			Overall
Team	W	L	T	W		L		T
No. 5 Lafayette		–		9	–	0	–	0
No. 10 Brown		–		9	–	0	–	1
NYU		–		8	–	1	–	0
No. 9 Army		–		7	–	1	–	1
Washington & Jefferson		–		7	–	1	–	1
Boston College		–		6	–	0	–	2
No. 10 Penn		–		7	–	1	–	1
Cornell		–		6	–	1	–	1
Princeton		–		5	–	1	–	1
Carnegie Tech		–		7	–	2	–	0
Springfield		–		6	–	2	–	0
Syracuse		–		7	–	2	–	1
Villanova		–		6	–	2	–	1
Colgate		–		5	–	2	–	2
Columbia		–		6	–	3	–	0
Pittsburgh		–		5	–	2	–	2
CCNY		–		5	–	3	–	0
Temple		–		5	–	3	–	0
Penn State		–		5	–	4	–	0
Tufts		–		4	–	4	–	0
Yale		–		4	–	4	–	0
Bucknell		–		4	–	5	–	1
Fordham		–		3	–	4	–	1
Harvard		–		3	–	5	–	0
Rutgers		–		3	–	6	–	0
Vermont		–		3	–	6	–	0
Drexel		–		2	–	5	–	0
Boston University		–		2	–	6	–	0
Lehigh		–		1	–	8	–	0
Franklin & Marshall		–		0	–	8	–	1
Rankings from Dickinson System

The 1926 Dartmouth Indians football team was an American football team that represented Dartmouth College as an independent during the 1926 college football season. In their fourth season under head coach Jesse Hawley, the Indians compiled a 4–4 record. Newman Horton was the team captain.

Myles Lane was the team's leading scorer, with 80 points, from 13 touchdowns and two kicked extra points.

Dartmouth played its home games at Memorial Field on the college campus in Hanover, New Hampshire.

== Schedule ==
Date	Opponent	Site	Result	Attendance	Source
September 25	Norwich	Memorial Field; Hanover, NH	W 59–0		
October 2	Hobart	Memorial Field; Hanover, NH	W 50–0		
October 9	VPI	Memorial Field; Hanover, NH	W 20–0		
October 16	at Yale	Yale Bowl; New Haven, CT	L 7–14	55,000	
October 23	at Harvard	Harvard Stadium; Boston, MA (rivalry)	L 12–16	53,000	
October 30	Brown	Memorial Field; Hanover, NH	L 0–10	20,000	
November 6	Boston University	Memorial Field; Hanover, NH	W 32–0		
November 13	at Cornell	Schoellkopf Field; Ithaca, NY (rivalry)	L 23–24	25,000	
