= Brown Bears =

Sports teams that represent Brown University

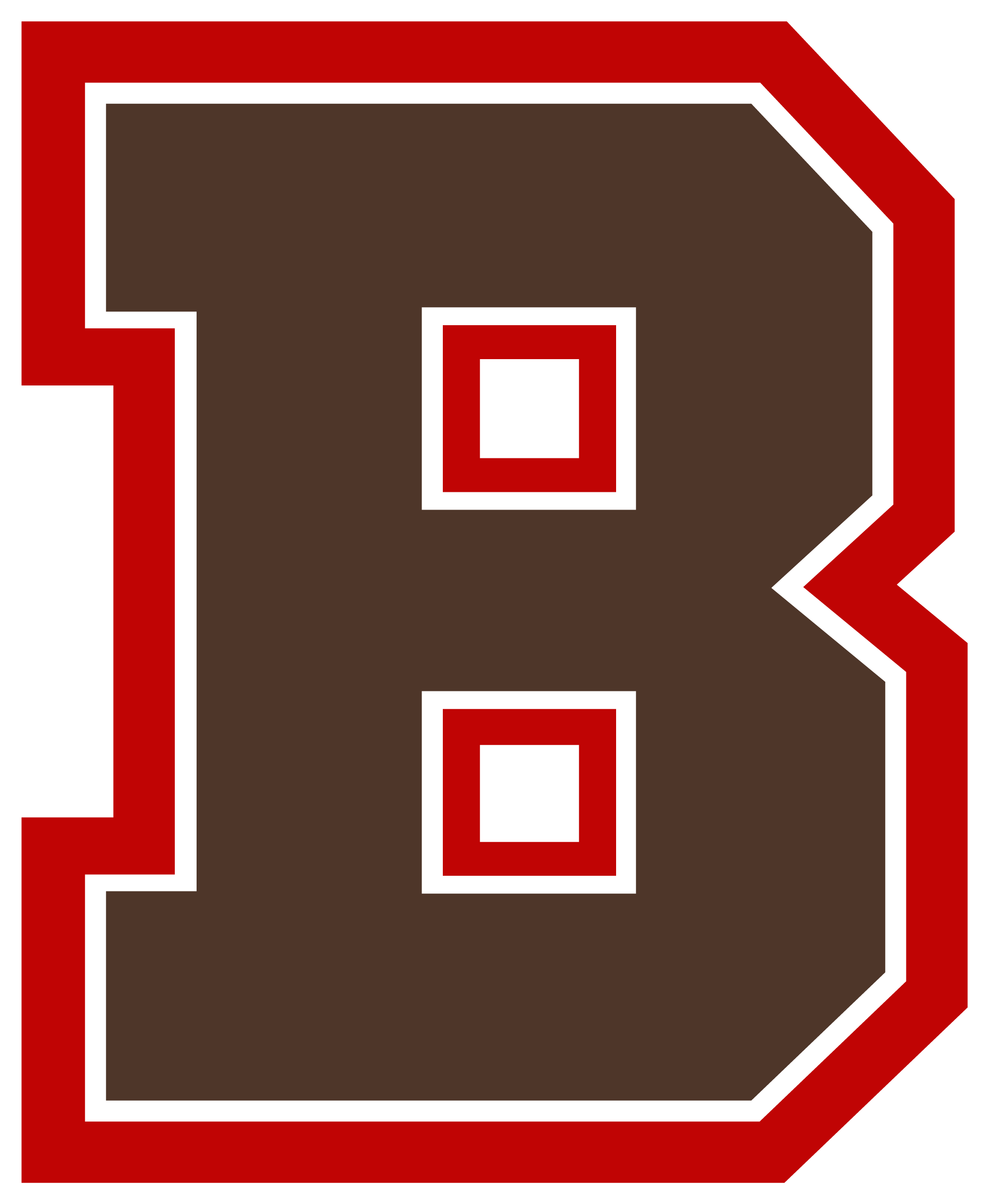
- University: Brown University
- Nickname: Bears
- NCAA: Division I (FCS)
- Conference: Ivy League (primary) Other conferences: List: ECAC Hockey; EIWA (wrestling); EARC (rowing); NEISA (sailing); NCEA (women's equestrian); CWPA (women's water polo); NWPC (men's water polo)
- Athletic director: M. Grace Calhoun
- Location: Providence, Rhode Island
- Varsity teams: 38
- Football stadium: Richard Gouse Field at Brown Stadium
- Basketball arena: Pizzitola Sports Center
- Ice hockey arena: Meehan Auditorium
- Baseball stadium: Murray Stadium
- Softball stadium: Brown Softball Field
- Soccer stadium: Stevenson Field
- Rowing venue: Hunter S. Marston Boathouse
- Sailing venue: Ted Turner Sailing Pavilion
- Volleyball arena: Pizzitola Sports Center
- Colors: Seal brown, cardinal red, and white
- Mascot: Bruno
- Fight song: Ever True To Brown
- Website: brownbears.com
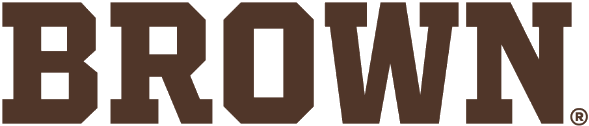

The Brown Bears are the sports teams that represent Brown University, an American university located in Providence, Rhode Island. The Bears are part of the Ivy League conference. Brown's mascot is Bruno. Both the men's and women's teams share the name, competing in 34 National Collegiate Athletic Association (NCAA) Division I sports. In football, the Bears, along with all other the Ivy League teams, compete in the Football Championship Subdivision (FCS).

== Varsity athletics ==
The Bears participate in 38 NCAA sports. The Bears first fielded a football team in 1878, playing Amherst College in their inaugural game.

The Bears participate in the following varsity sports:

Men's sports	Women's sports
Baseball	Basketball
Basketball	Crew
Crew	Cross Country
Cross Country	Equestrian
Football	Fencing
Golf	Field Hockey
Ice Hockey	Golf
Lacrosse	Gymnastics
Soccer	Ice Hockey
Squash	Lacrosse
Swimming & Diving	Rugby
Tennis	Sailing
Track & Field ^{†}	Squash
Water Polo	Soccer
Wrestling	Softball
	Swimming & Diving
	Tennis
	Track & Field ^{†}
	Volleyball
	Water Polo
Co-ed sports
Sailing
†: Track and field includes both indoor and outdoor.

=== Additions and subtractions ===
In 2011, a Special Committee recommended that Brown cut four varsity sports due to Brown's budget cut backs—men's fencing, women's fencing, men's wrestling, and women's skiing—and recommended elevating at least one women's sport to varsity status to ensure Title IX compliance. These proposed changes would have reduced the number of varsity sports at Brown from 37 to 34. None of the four varsity programs were cut.

In May 2020, Brown announced they would transition eleven varsity programs—men's and women's fencing, men's and women's golf, women's skiing, men's and women's squash, women's equestrian, men's indoor track and field, men's outdoor track and field and men's cross country—to club status. Women's sailing and coed sailing would become varsity programs. Brown had 38 varsity sports before the announced cuts (only Harvard and Stanford had more), but was the least successful Ivy League school, winning 2.8% of league titles from 2008 to 2018.

In December 2020, the women's fencing and equestrian teams were restored to varsity status.

In January 2026, the University announced that men's and women's squash and men's and women's golf would be restored to varsity status as of July 1, 2026.

== Teams ==
=== Men's basketball ===
The Brown Bears men's basketball team competes in the Ivy League. The Brown Bears have appeared in the NCAA Tournament two times, including the inaugural tournament in 1939. Their combined record is 0–2. The Brown Bears have appeared in the National Invitation Tournament (NIT) one time. Their record is 0–1.

=== Women's basketball ===
The Brown Bears women's basketball team competes in the Ivy League. The Brown Bears have appeared in the NCAA Tournament once in 1994, where their record was 0–1.

=== Football ===
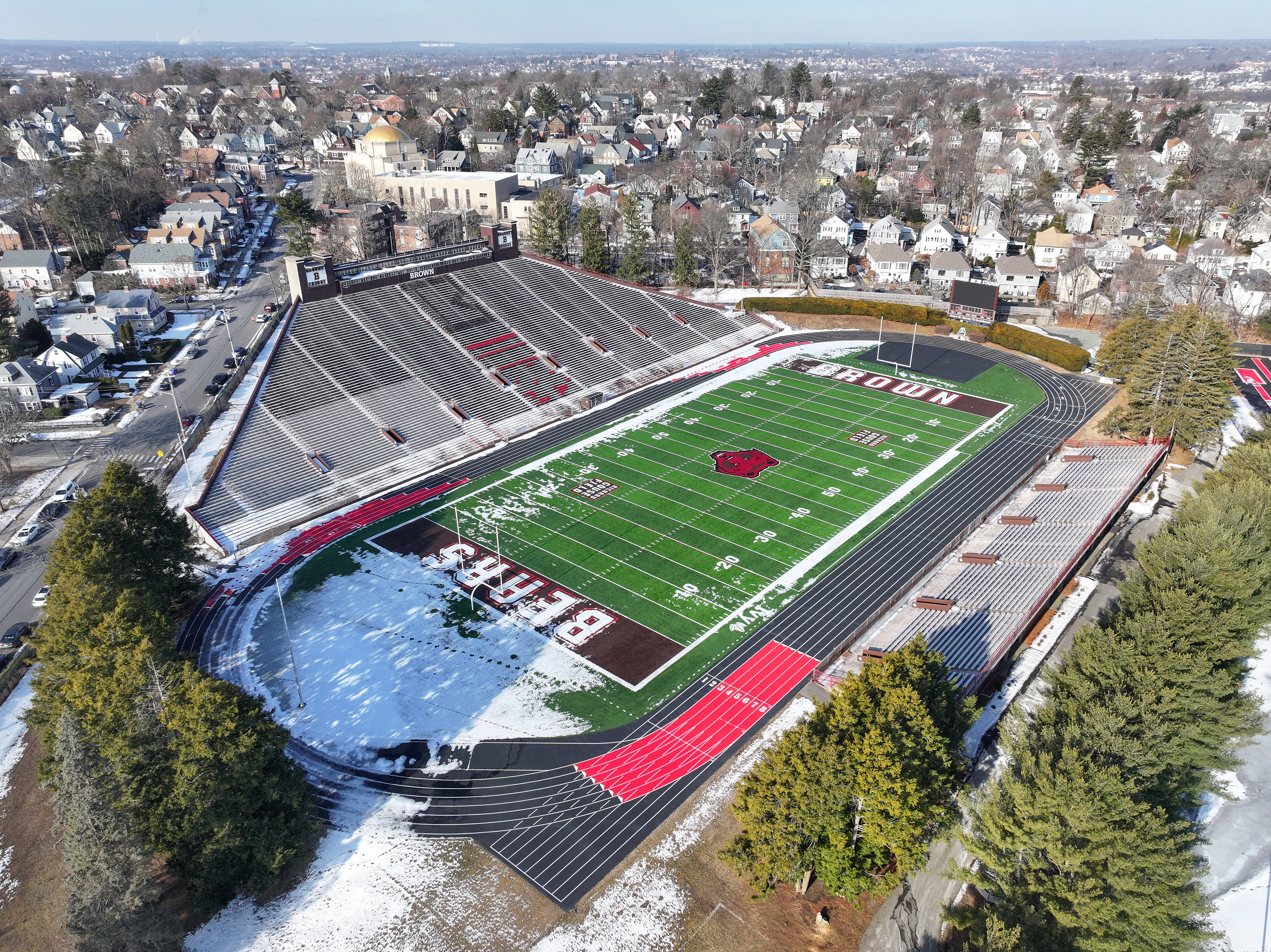
Brown Stadium

The Brown Bears football team competes in the NCAA Division I Football Championship Subdivision (FCS) and are members of the Ivy League. Brown's first football team was fielded in 1878. The team plays its home games at the 20,000 seat Brown Stadium in Providence.

=== Men's lacrosse ===
The Brown Bears men's lacrosse team competes in the Ivy League and plays its home games at Stevenson-Pincince Field.

=== Men's soccer ===
The Brown Bears men's soccer team compete in the NCAA Division I in the Ivy League. The Bears have been semifinalists in the NCAA tournament in 1968, 1973, and 1975. They also finished in fourth place in 1977.

=== Water sports ===
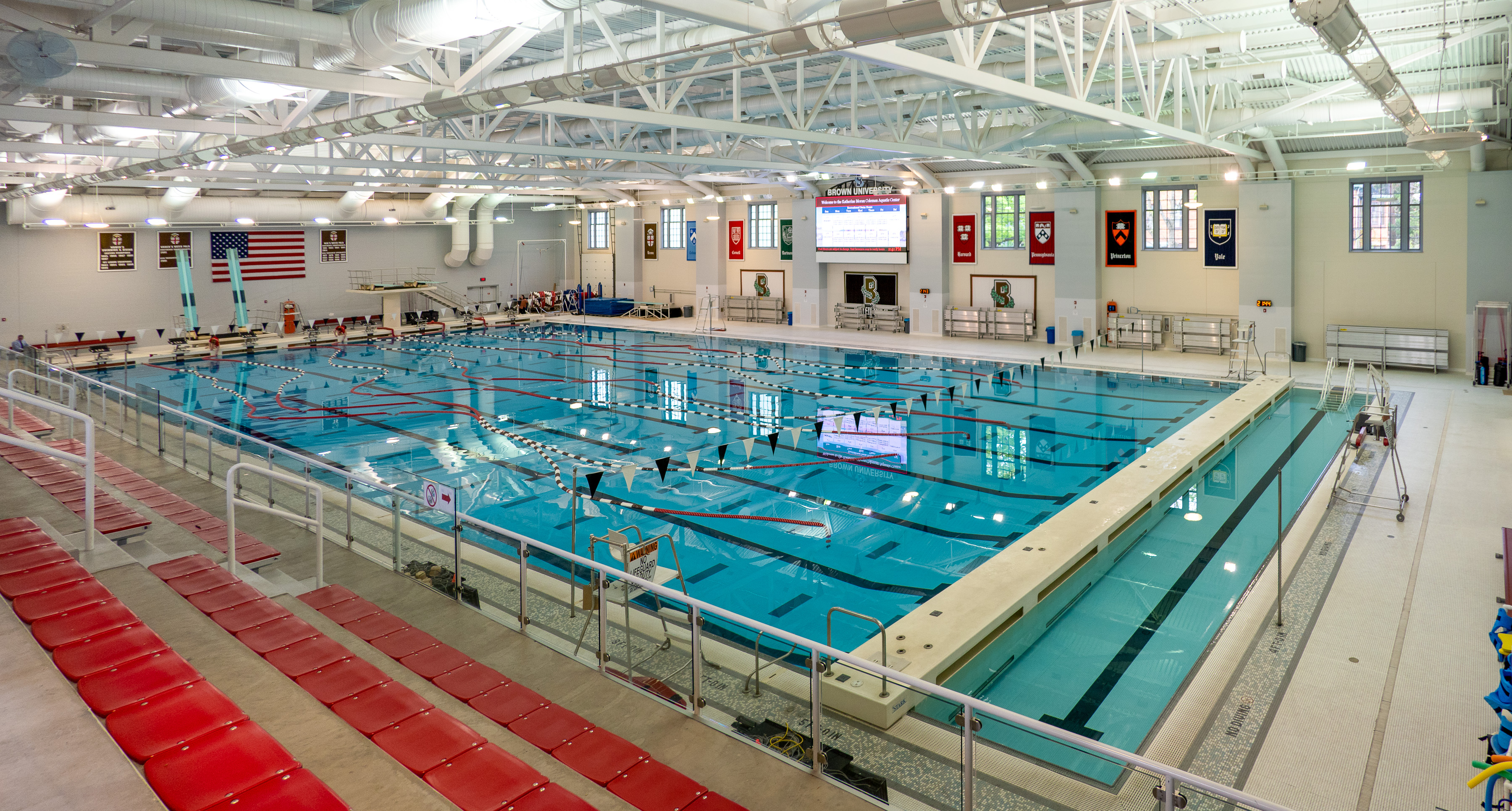
Katherine Moran Coleman Aquatics Center

The Katherine Moran Coleman Aquatics Center is home to Brown's swimming, diving, and water polo teams. The pool, which measures 56 meters long by 25 yards wide, opened in May 2012.

=== Rugby ===
Women's rugby at Brown was originally founded as a club team, Brown Women's RFC, in 1977. Brown added rugby as a varsity sport for women beginning in the 2014–15 academic year, due in part to the growth of rugby across communities and at the high school level. Brown women's rugby is led by Head Coach Kathy Flores.

Brown has offered men's rugby at Brown as a club sport since 1960. Brown plays in the Ivy Rugby Conference against its traditional Ivy League rivals. Brown men's rugby is led by Head Coach David Laflamme. Despite its club status, Brown men's rugby is supported by an endowment raised by Brown rugby alumni that exceeds $1.5 million; this endowment funds the full-time professional head coaching position and other expenses.

== Championships ==
=== NCAA team championships ===
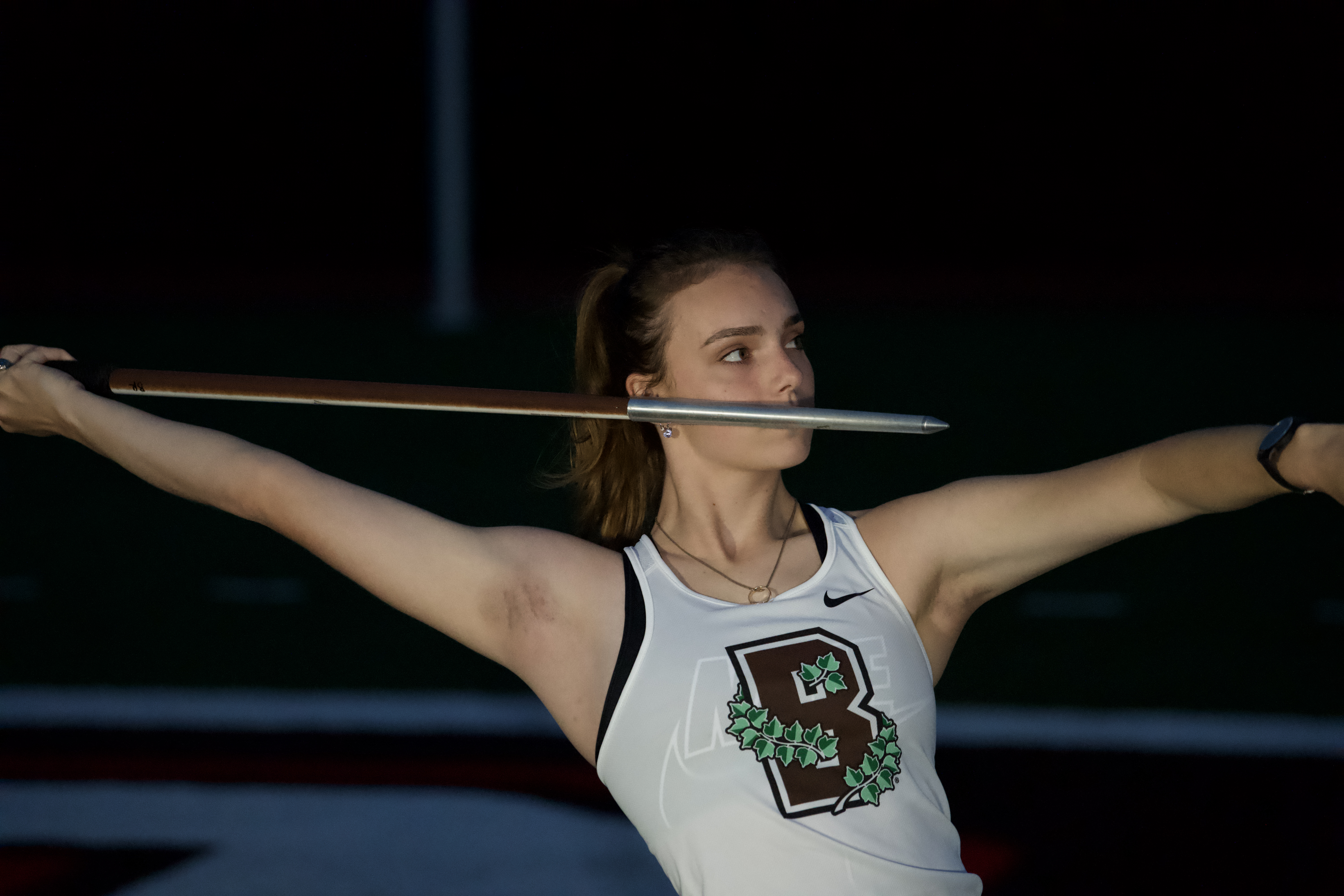
A Brown Bears women's track and field team member

Brown has 7 NCAA team national championships.

- Women's (7)
  - Rowing (7): 1999, 2000, 2002, 2004, 2007, 2008, 2011
- see also:
  - Ivy League NCAA team championships
  - List of NCAA schools with the most NCAA Division I championships

=== Non-NCAA team championships ===
- Coed Sailing (2)
  - Coed Dinghy National Champions (2): 1942, 1948
- Women's Sailing (5)
  - Women's Dinghy National Champions (5): 1985, 1988, 1989, 1998, 2019
- Men's Ultimate Frisbee (3)
  - USA Ultimate College Champions (3): 2000, 2005, 2019

== Mascot ==
Bruno mascot costumes

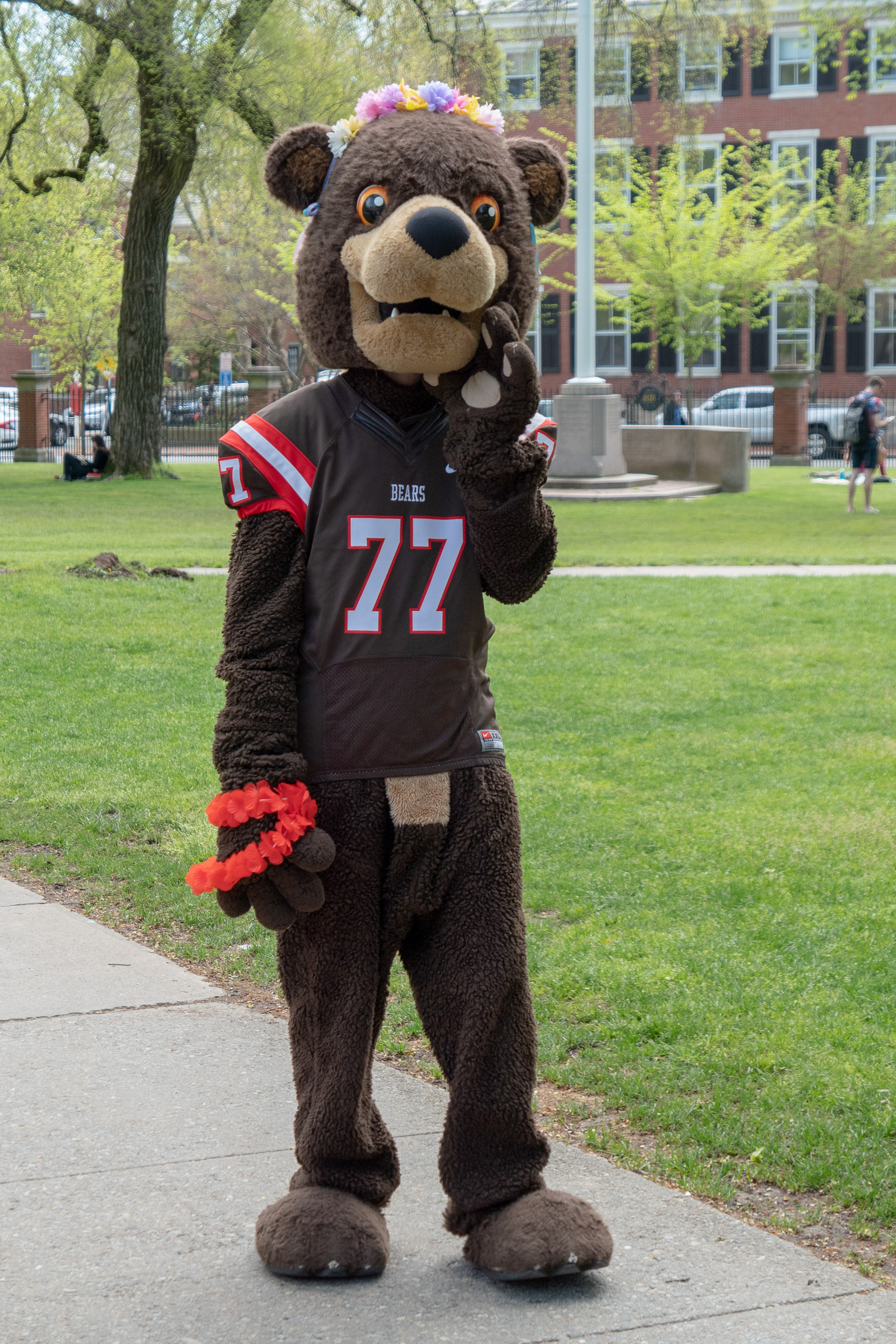
Bruno in 2019

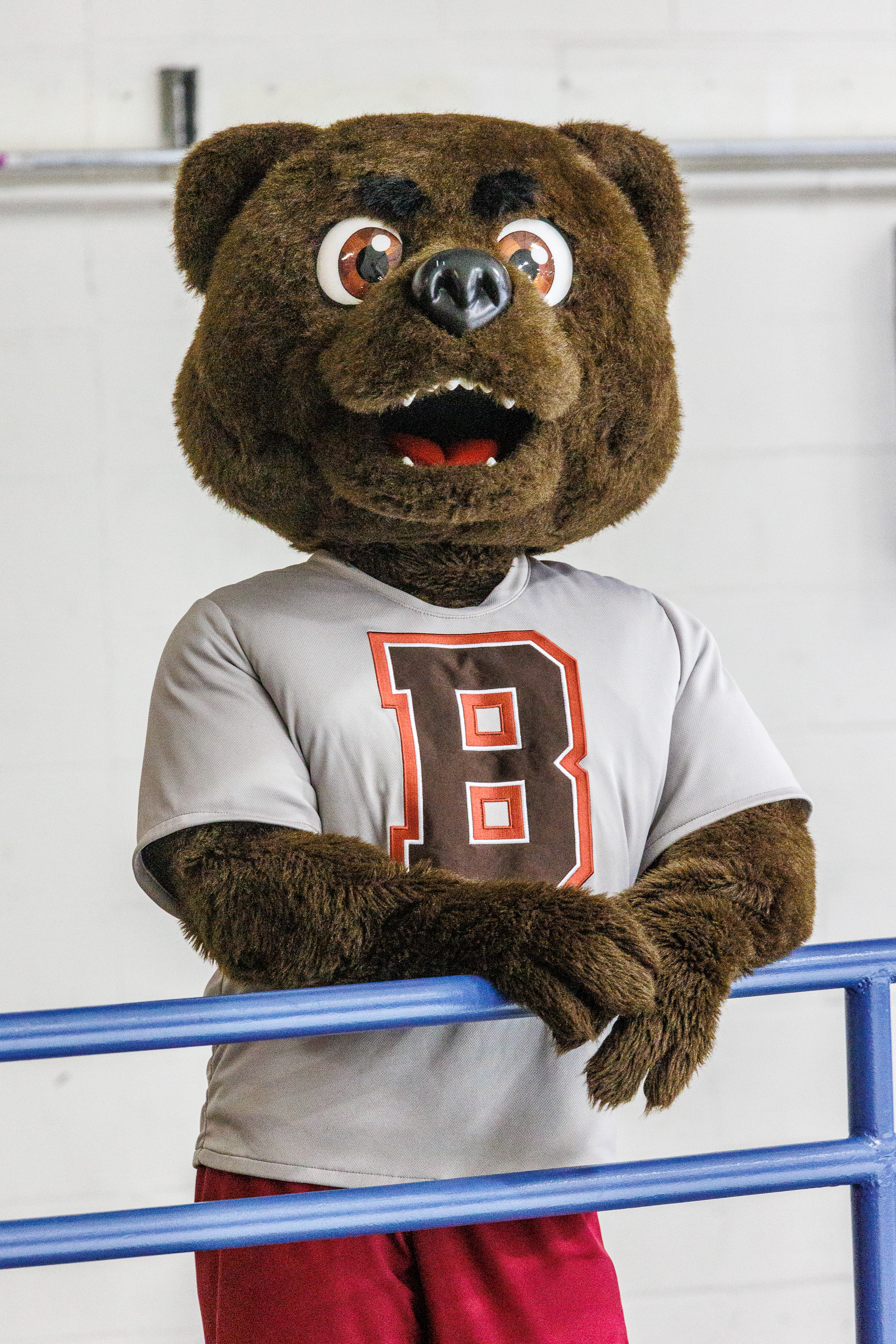
Bruno in 2023

Brown's first mascot was a burro, first introduced in 1902 in a game against Harvard. The burro mascot was not retained after it seemed frightened by the noise of the game, and due to the laughter it provoked. The university originally settled on the Bruin, but later changed it to a bear after the head of a bear was placed at an archway above the student union in 1904. In 1905 The Bears introduced Helen, the university's first live bear mascot, at a game against Dartmouth. Bruno, Brown's current mascot, was introduced in 1921, originally also as a live bear. A number of bears represented Bruno over the years, later being represented by a person in costume by the late 1960s.

== Notable athletes ==
The Bears have produced many notable athletes. One of Brown's most famous athletes is John Heisman, namesake of the Heisman Trophy. Before finishing college at the University of Pennsylvania, Heisman played college football at Brown as a lineman.

=== Football ===
- Thomas A. Barry (Class of 1902): All American running back, head coach of The University of Notre Dame and University of Tulane football programs
- Don Colo (Class of 1950): professional American football player, All-Pro who played for the Cleveland Browns
- Zak DeOssie (Class of 2007): professional American football player, Pro Bowl longsnapper for the Super Bowl XLII and XLVI champion New York Giants
- John Heisman: college American football player and coach; namesake of the Heisman Trophy
- Steve Jordan (Class of 1981): professional American football player, 6-time All-Pro tight end who played for the Minnesota Vikings
- Ed Lawrence (Class of 1928): American football player, member of the 1926 "Iron Men" football team
- Sean Morey: Special Teams Captain of 2005 Super Bowl XL Champion Pittsburgh Steelers
- Joe Paterno (Class of 1950): quarterback and cornerback for the Bears, head coach of the Penn State Nittany Lions from 1966 to 2011.
- E. J. Perry (Class of 2021): professional American football player.
- Fritz Pollard: First African-American NFL coach and one of the first two African American players.
- Earl Sprackling, Brown quarterback, 1909–11; named the deserving retrospective recipient of the Heisman Trophy for 1910 by "ESPN College Football Encyclopedia: The Complete History of the Game".
- Thurston Towle (Class of 1928): American football player, member of the 1926 "Iron Men" football team
- Wallace Wade (Class of 1917): American football coach at the University of Alabama and Duke University, namesake of Duke's football stadium

=== Baseball ===
- Bill Almon: professional baseball player, #1 pick in the 1974 Major League Baseball draft
- Mark Attanasio (Class of 1979): financier and owner of the Milwaukee Brewers
- Tommy Dowd: professional baseball player
- Dave Fultz (Class of 1898): professional baseball player
- Irving "Bump" Hadley (Class of 1928): professional baseball player, pitcher for the Washington Senators and New York Yankees
- Lee Richmond: professional baseball player, first major league player to throw a perfect game.

=== Rowing ===
- Jamie Koven (Class of 1995): US national rower, World Champion in single scull 1997 France
- Xeno Muller (Class of 1993): Swiss rower, Olympic gold medalist in single scull 1996 Atlanta
- Denis Žvegelj (Class of 1997): Slovenian Rower, Brown Crew Varsity Eight 1994, 1995, 1992 bronze medalist in Men's Coxless Pairs
- Tessa Gobbo (Class of 2013): US national rower, Olympic Gold Medalist in women's eight, 2016

=== Ice hockey ===
- Katie King-Crowley (Class of 1997): Olympic gold ('98), silver ('02), and bronze ('06) medal-winning hockey player
- Curt Bennett (Class of 1970): professional ice hockey player, St. Louis Blues and Atlanta Flames
- Yann Danis (Class of 2004): professional ice hockey player, Montreal Canadiens and New York Islanders
- Brian Eklund: retired professional hockey player, Stanley Cup Champion
- Jade Iginla (Class of 2026): professional ice hockey player, drafted 18th overall to PWHL Hamilton in 2026.

=== Other sports ===
- Daveed Diggs (Class of 2004): track and field, set the Brown Bears' record for the 110 hurdles as a sophomore with a time of 14.21 seconds. Went on to a successful career in acting.
- Mark Donohue (Class of 1959): professional racing driver, 1972 Indianapolis 500 champion
- Cory Gibbs (Class of 2001): professional soccer player, Chicago Fire
- Lindsay Gottlieb (Class of 1999): head coach of University of California women's basketball
- Anne Hird (born 1959) — pioneering female distance runner, US National Champion in the 10-mile and 30K races
- Fred Hovey (1890): professional tennis player, US Open Men's Doubles Champion (1893) and Men's Singles Champion (1895)
- Craig Kinsley (Class of 2011): professional javelin thrower, 2010 NCAA Champion and member of the 2012 U.S. Olympic Team. Current Assistant Throws' Coach for Brown Track & Field
- Jimmy Pedro: most decorated American judo athlete; Judo World Champion (1999), two-time Olympic bronze medalist (1996, 2004)
- Richard Phillips (1950): 1949 NCAA, indoor AAU, and outdoor AAU high jump champion
- Alicia Sacramone (2007): gymnast who competed at the 2008 Summer Olympics
- Norman Taber (Class of 1913): track and field athlete, member of the 1912 Olympic gold medal-winning 3,000-m relay team
- Fred Tenney: professional baseball player
- Chazz Woodson (Class of 2005): Major League Lacrosse player currently with the Chicago Machine
- Marcus Wertheim (Class of 2026): Professional Lacrosse League player drafted pick 2 of the 4th round to the California Redwoods in 2026.
