= Ed Lawrence =

American football player (1906–1961)

Profile
- Positions: Halfback, end, fullback

Personal information
- Born: July 16, 1906; Fitchburg, Massachusetts, U.S.
- Died: November 21, 1961 (aged 55); Moapa, Nevada, U.S.
- Listed height: 5 ft 11 in (1.80 m)
- Listed weight: 165 lb (75 kg)

Career information
- High school: Fitchburg
- College: Brown

Career history
- Boston Bulldogs (1929); Staten Island Stapletons (1930)
- Stats at Pro Football Reference

Edward James Lawrence (July 16, 1906 – November 21, 1961) was an American football player who played professionally for two seasons in the National Football League (NFL) with the Boston Bulldogs in 1929 and the Staten Island Stapletons in 1930. Prior to joining the NFL, Lawrence played college football at Brown University. He was a member of the 1926 "Iron Men" Brown football team, which went 9–0–1, and played all but two minutes against Yale, Dartmouth, and Harvard.

After graduating from Brown in 1927, Lawrence worked in insurance and then as marketing specialist in Providence, Rhode Island. He was later the comptroller for the Warm Springs Ranch in Moapa, Nevada. He died on November 21, 1961, in Moapa.
