= 1926 NYU Violets football team =

American college football season

1926 NYU Violets football
- Conference: Independent
- Record: 8–1
- Head coach: Chick Meehan (2nd season)
- Captain: Frank Briante
- Home stadium: Ohio Field; Yankee Stadium

1926 Eastern college football independents records
	Conf.			Overall
Team	W	L	T	W		L		T
No. 5 Lafayette		–		9	–	0	–	0
No. 10 Brown		–		9	–	0	–	1
NYU		–		8	–	1	–	0
No. 9 Army		–		7	–	1	–	1
Washington & Jefferson		–		7	–	1	–	1
Boston College		–		6	–	0	–	2
No. 10 Penn		–		7	–	1	–	1
Cornell		–		6	–	1	–	1
Princeton		–		5	–	1	–	1
Carnegie Tech		–		7	–	2	–	0
Springfield		–		6	–	2	–	0
Syracuse		–		7	–	2	–	1
Villanova		–		6	–	2	–	1
Colgate		–		5	–	2	–	2
Columbia		–		6	–	3	–	0
Pittsburgh		–		5	–	2	–	2
CCNY		–		5	–	3	–	0
Temple		–		5	–	3	–	0
Penn State		–		5	–	4	–	0
Tufts		–		4	–	4	–	0
Yale		–		4	–	4	–	0
Bucknell		–		4	–	5	–	1
Fordham		–		3	–	4	–	1
Harvard		–		3	–	5	–	0
Rutgers		–		3	–	6	–	0
Vermont		–		3	–	6	–	0
Drexel		–		2	–	5	–	0
Boston University		–		2	–	6	–	0
Lehigh		–		1	–	8	–	0
Franklin & Marshall		–		0	–	8	–	1
Rankings from Dickinson System

The 1926 NYU Violets football team was an American football team that represented New York University (NYU) as an independent during the 1926 college football season. In their second season under head coach Chick Meehan, the team compiled an 8–1 record, shut out six opponents, and outscored all opponents by a total of 172 to 25. NYU back Ken Strong was later inducted into both the College Football Hall of Fame and the Pro Football Hall of Fame.

== Schedule ==
Date	Opponent	Site	Result	Attendance	Source
September 25	Niagara	Ohio Field; Bronx, NY	W 34–0	10,000	
October 2	Allegheny	Ohio Field; Bronx, NY	W 13–0	10,000	
October 9	West Virginia Wesleyan	Ohio Field; Bronx, NY	W 24–7		
October 16	Tulane	Yankee Stadium; Bronx, NY	W 21–0	25,000	
October 23	Rutgers	Yankee Stadium; Bronx, NY	W 30–0	20,000	
October 30	vs. Fordham	Yankee Stadium; Bronx, NY	W 27–3	25,000	
November 6	Carnegie Tech	Yankee Stadium; Bronx, NY	W 6–0	35,000	
November 13	Davis & Elkins	Ohio Field; Bronx, NY	W 10–0	10,000	
November 20	at Nebraska	Memorial Stadium; Lincoln, NE	L 7–15	15,000	

== Season overview ==
Meehan took over as NYU's head football coach in 1925, after five years as head coach at Syracuse. Meehan recruited top players to the school by touting the school's educational advantages. At least eleven of the team's players went on to play in the National Football League (NFL): Frank Briante, John Bunyan, Bob Dunn, Beryl Follet, Bing Miller, Dave Myers, Mike Riordan Ollie Satenstein, Jack Shapiro, Dave Skudin, and Ken Strong. Strong was later inducted into both the College Football Hall of Fame and Pro Football Hall of Fame.

Meehan also established a strict training regimen, resulting in a team that was described as a "husky outfit" that played with "clockwork operations" and "all the timing and rhythm of big league baseball."

The team won its first eight games, including four consecutive victories over major football powers of the era, Tulane, Rutgers, Fordham, and Carnegie Tech - each game played in front of large crowds at Yankee Stadium. On defense, the team shut out six of its first eight opponents. The team's turnaround drew national attention, an Ohio sports writer noting:

One of the big surprises of the current season is [NYU] . . . In its first six games, Meehan's boys ran through the opposition in a reckless manner. Their unexpected achievement was the 21-0 triumph over Tulane, which last year boasted one of the strongest elevens in the entire country.

The sole setback was against Nebraska, a 15–7 loss played in a snowstorm in Lincoln, Nebraska.

In 1960, Art Daley wrote in The New York Times: "The Violet became the Violent Violet under Meehan. Although no national championships were won, NYU rarely missed by much from 1925 to 1931." Meehan was elsewhere credited with "boosting the Violets into national prominence during seven seasons, 1925-1931."

== Personnel ==
- Earl Ashton, end from Easton, PA
- Frank Briante, fullback and captain
- John Bunyan
- Jack Connor, quarterback from Exeter, NH
- Bob Dunn, center from Waterbury CT
- Al Lassman, tackle from Cambridge, MA, 208 pounds, 6'4"
- John Miller
- Mike Riordan, end from Bristol, CT
- Arthur Roberts, back from Holyoke, MA
- Runyan
- Dave Skudin, guard
- Ken Strong, back from West Haven, CT

Connor received first-team honors on the 1926 All-Eastern football team.
