= 1926 Brown Bears football team =

American college football season

1926 Brown Bears football
- Brown's starting 11, known as the "Iron Men"
- Conference: Independent
- Record: 9–0–1
- Head coach: Tuss McLaughry (1st season)
- Home stadium: Brown Stadium

1926 Eastern college football independents records
	Conf.			Overall
Team	W	L	T	W		L		T
No. 5 Lafayette		–		9	–	0	–	0
No. 10 Brown		–		9	–	0	–	1
NYU		–		8	–	1	–	0
No. 9 Army		–		7	–	1	–	1
Washington & Jefferson		–		7	–	1	–	1
Boston College		–		6	–	0	–	2
No. 10 Penn		–		7	–	1	–	1
Cornell		–		6	–	1	–	1
Princeton		–		5	–	1	–	1
Carnegie Tech		–		7	–	2	–	0
Springfield		–		6	–	2	–	0
Syracuse		–		7	–	2	–	1
Villanova		–		6	–	2	–	1
Colgate		–		5	–	2	–	2
Columbia		–		6	–	3	–	0
Pittsburgh		–		5	–	2	–	2
CCNY		–		5	–	3	–	0
Temple		–		5	–	3	–	0
Penn State		–		5	–	4	–	0
Tufts		–		4	–	4	–	0
Yale		–		4	–	4	–	0
Bucknell		–		4	–	5	–	1
Fordham		–		3	–	4	–	1
Harvard		–		3	–	5	–	0
Rutgers		–		3	–	6	–	0
Vermont		–		3	–	6	–	0
Drexel		–		2	–	5	–	0
Boston University		–		2	–	6	–	0
Lehigh		–		1	–	8	–	0
Franklin & Marshall		–		0	–	8	–	1
Rankings from Dickinson System

The 1926 Brown Bears football team, also known as the "Iron Men", was an American football team that represented Brown University as an independent during the 1926 college football season. In their first year under head coach Tuss McLaughry, the Bears compiled a 9–0–1 record, outscored their opponents by a total of 223 to 36, and recorded seven defensive shutouts. The 9–0–1 record remains Brown's only undefeated season to date.

The team became known as the "Iron Men", because the starting eleven played long stretches, including two consecutive games in their entirety, without substitutions. Three Brown players received first-team honors on the 1926 All-America college football team: quarterback Roy Randall, tackle Orland Smith, and end Hal Broda.

== Schedule ==
Date	Opponent	Site	Result	Attendance	Source
September 25	Rhode Island State	Brown Stadium; Providence, RI (rivalry)	W 14–0		
October 2	Colby	Brown Stadium; Providence, RI	W 35–0		
October 9	Lehigh	Brown Stadium; Providence, RI	W 32–0		
October 16	Bates	Brown Stadium; Providence, RI	W 27–14		
October 23	at Yale	Yale Bowl; New Haven, CT	W 7–0		
October 30	at Dartmouth	Memorial Field; Hanover, NH	W 10–0	20,000	
November 6	Norwich	Brown Stadium; Providence, RI	W 27–0		
November 13	at Harvard	Harvard Stadium; Boston, MA	W 21–0		
November 20	New Hampshire	Brown Stadium; Providence, RI	W 40–12		
November 27	Colgate	Brown Stadium; Providence, RI	T 10–10	30,000	

== Iron Men ==
The 1926 Bears were nicknamed the "Iron Men" because of the significant play time the first squad saw in several key games. Against Yale, Brown's starters played every minute of the game without substitution and won, 7–0. The following week, the same eleven played the duration of a 10–0 win over Dartmouth, another period powerhouse. In order to rest his starters, McLaughry fielded the second string the next weekend against Norwich, and they won decisively, 27–0. A week later at Harvard Stadium, the Iron Men played 58 minutes of the 26–0 shutout of the Crimson, their third and final Ancient Eight opponent. McLaughry sent in the substitutes for the final two minutes so that they would earn their varsity letters. In the season's finale, Colgate held the Iron Men to a tie, 10–10.

== Awards and honors ==
No Brown player was a consensus pick for the 1926 All-America college football team, though the following three players received first-team honors from one or more selectors:

- End Hal Broda received first-team honors from the United Press, Central Press (CP), New York Sun (NYS), and Red Grange (RG).
- Tackle Orland Smith received first team honors from Collier's Weekly, as selected by Grantland Rice (COL), the International News Service (INS), Lawrence Perry (LP), and Walter Eckersall (WE).
- Quarterback Roy Randall received first-team honors from the All-American Board selected by Knute Rockne, Pop Warner, and Tad Jones (AAB) and the Walter Camp Football Foundation (WCFF).

Two Brown players received first-team honors on 1926 All-Eastern football teams: Randall and Broda both received the honor from the Associated Press (AP), Brooklyn Daily Eagle (BDE), Brooklyn Times (BT), and Tad Jones (TJ).

== Personnel ==
=== Players ===
At the end of the season, 24 players received varsity letters. Eleven of those honored were the "Iron Men" as follows:

- Hal A. Broda, Canton, OH
- Charles Consodine, Brewster, MA
- Albert Cornsweet, Cleveland, OH
- Louis Farber, Pawtucket, RI
- Paul Hodge, Fitchburg, MA
- Edward J. Lawrence, Fitchburg, MA
- Ed Mavorkian, Newton, MA
- Dave Mishel, Lynn, MA
- Roy Randall, Brockton, MA
- Orland Smith, Brockton, MA
- Thurston Towle, Pawtucket, RI

In addition, the following additional 13 players from the "B" team also received letters: Paul B. Eden, Newport, RI; William J. Miller, Ward Hill, MA; Harry Cornsweet, Cleveland, OH; Walter Trefethen, Portland, ME; Charles W. Provonchee, Cambridge, MA: Frank Eisenberg, Glens Falls, NY; Charles Holden, Peabody, MA; Hyman Heller, Willimantic, CT; John S. Stewart, Bradley Beach, NJ; Gorman Searle, New Bedford, MA; Winston Dodge, New Bedford, MA; Stephen Crilly, Cleveland, and Howard Husker, Waterbury, CT.

=== Coaching staff ===
- Head coach: Tuss McLaughry
- Manager: Edward L. Leighton

== See also ==
- One-platoon system, "iron man football"
