= Dave Mishel =

American football player (1905–1975)

Profile
- Position: Halfback

Personal information
- Born: July 6, 1905; Lynn, Massachusetts, U.S.
- Died: March 11, 1975 (aged 69); Boston, Massachusetts, U.S.
- Listed height: 5 ft 9 in (1.75 m)
- Listed weight: 179 lb (81 kg)

Career information
- High school: Lynn Classical
- College: Brown

Career history
- Providence Steam Roller (1927); Cleveland Indians (NFL) (1931)

Awards and highlights
- Second-team All-American (1926)
- Stats at Pro Football Reference

David F. Mishel (July 6, 1905 – March 11, 1975) was an American football player.

Mishel was born in 1905 in Lynn, Massachusetts. He attended Lynn Classical High School where he lettered in football, baseball, track, and basketball.

Mishel played college football at Brown University in 1925 and 1926. He was a member of the undefeated 1926 Brown Bears football team that became known as the "Iron Men". He was a triple-threat man at Brown known for his talents in kicking, passing and carrying the ball. He was selected as a second-team All-American in 1926 by Davis J. Walsh of the International News Service.

Mishel then played at the halfback position in the National Football League (NFL) for the Providence Steam Rollers in 1927 and for the Cleveland Indians in 1931.

Mishel was hired in 1932 as a member of Boston University's physical education staff, where he oversaw the intramural sports program. In June 1933, he became an assistant coach on the school's football team.

Mishel later founded the Brunonia Boys Camp. He was also inducted into the Brown University Athletic Hall of Fame. He died in 1975 in Newton, Massachusetts.
