= 1926 Carnegie Tech Tartans football team =

American college football season

1926 Carnegie Tech Tartans football
- Conference: Independent
- Record: 7–2
- Head coach: Walter Steffen (12th season)

1926 Eastern college football independents records
	Conf.			Overall
Team	W	L	T	W		L		T
No. 5 Lafayette		–		9	–	0	–	0
No. 10 Brown		–		9	–	0	–	1
NYU		–		8	–	1	–	0
No. 9 Army		–		7	–	1	–	1
Washington & Jefferson		–		7	–	1	–	1
Boston College		–		6	–	0	–	2
No. 10 Penn		–		7	–	1	–	1
Cornell		–		6	–	1	–	1
Princeton		–		5	–	1	–	1
Carnegie Tech		–		7	–	2	–	0
Springfield		–		6	–	2	–	0
Syracuse		–		7	–	2	–	1
Villanova		–		6	–	2	–	1
Colgate		–		5	–	2	–	2
Columbia		–		6	–	3	–	0
Pittsburgh		–		5	–	2	–	2
CCNY		–		5	–	3	–	0
Temple		–		5	–	3	–	0
Penn State		–		5	–	4	–	0
Tufts		–		4	–	4	–	0
Yale		–		4	–	4	–	0
Bucknell		–		4	–	5	–	1
Fordham		–		3	–	4	–	1
Harvard		–		3	–	5	–	0
Rutgers		–		3	–	6	–	0
Vermont		–		3	–	6	–	0
Drexel		–		2	–	5	–	0
Boston University		–		2	–	6	–	0
Lehigh		–		1	–	8	–	0
Franklin & Marshall		–		0	–	8	–	1
Rankings from Dickinson System

The 1926 Carnegie Tech Tartans football team was an American football team that represented the Carnegie Institute of Technology (now known as Carnegie Mellon University) as an independent during the 1926 college football season. In their 12th year under head coach Walter Steffen, the Tartans compiled a 7–2 record, shut out seven of nine opponents, and outscored all opponents by a total of 207 to 23.

In their final game of the season, the Tartans defeated Notre Dame, 19–0. The game was ranked the fourth-greatest upset in college football history by ESPN.

Key players included fullback Bill Donohoe and tackle Lloyd Yoder. Yoder was selected as a first-team All-American by the Inter-sectional Board of Football coaches consisting of Knute Rockne, Pop Warner, and Tad Jones.

he team played its home games at Forbes Field in Pittsburgh.

== Schedule ==
Date	Opponent	Site	Result	Attendance	Source
October 2	at Thiel	Greenville, PA	W 42–0		
October 9	Adrian	Forbes Field; Pittsburgh, PA	W 47–0	7,000	
October 16	Washington & Jefferson	Pittsburgh, PA	L 6–17		
October 23	at Pittsburgh	Pittsburgh, PA	W 14–0	40,000	
October 30	at Detroit	University of Detroit Stadium; Detroit, MI	W 7–0		
November 6	at NYU	Yankee Stadium; Bronx, NY	L 0–6	35,000	
November 11	Juniata	Forbes Field; Pittsburgh, PA	W 52–0		
November 20	West Virginia	Forbes Field; Pittsburgh, PA	W 20–0	12,000	
November 27	Notre Dame	Forbes Field; Pittsburgh, PA	W 19–0	45,000	
