= 1926 Cornell Big Red football team =

American college football season

1926 Cornell Big Red football
- Conference: Independent
- Record: 6–1–1
- Head coach: Gil Dobie (7th season)
- Offensive scheme: Single-wing
- Base defense: 6–3–2
- Captain: Emerson Carey
- Home stadium: Schoellkopf Field

1926 Eastern college football independents records
	Conf.			Overall
Team	W	L	T	W		L		T
No. 5 Lafayette		–		9	–	0	–	0
No. 10 Brown		–		9	–	0	–	1
NYU		–		8	–	1	–	0
No. 9 Army		–		7	–	1	–	1
Washington & Jefferson		–		7	–	1	–	1
Boston College		–		6	–	0	–	2
No. 10 Penn		–		7	–	1	–	1
Cornell		–		6	–	1	–	1
Princeton		–		5	–	1	–	1
Carnegie Tech		–		7	–	2	–	0
Springfield		–		6	–	2	–	0
Syracuse		–		7	–	2	–	1
Villanova		–		6	–	2	–	1
Colgate		–		5	–	2	–	2
Columbia		–		6	–	3	–	0
Pittsburgh		–		5	–	2	–	2
CCNY		–		5	–	3	–	0
Temple		–		5	–	3	–	0
Penn State		–		5	–	4	–	0
Tufts		–		4	–	4	–	0
Yale		–		4	–	4	–	0
Bucknell		–		4	–	5	–	1
Fordham		–		3	–	4	–	1
Harvard		–		3	–	5	–	0
Rutgers		–		3	–	6	–	0
Vermont		–		3	–	6	–	0
Drexel		–		2	–	5	–	0
Boston University		–		2	–	6	–	0
Lehigh		–		1	–	8	–	0
Franklin & Marshall		–		0	–	8	–	1
Rankings from Dickinson System

The 1926 Cornell Big Red football team was an American football team that represented Cornell University during the 1926 college football season. In their seventh season under head coach Gil Dobie, the Big Red compiled a 6–1–1 record and outscored all opponents by a combined total of 191 to 64.

== Schedule ==
Date	Time	Opponent	Site	Result	Attendance	Source
September 25		Geneva	Schoellkopf Field; Ithaca, NY	W 6–0		
October 2		Niagara	Schoellkopf Field; Ithaca, NY	W 28–0		
October 9		Williams	Schoellkopf Field; Ithaca, NY	W 49–0		
October 16		Michigan State	Schoellkopf Field; Ithaca, NY	W 24–14		
October 30	2:30 p.m.	at Columbia	Polo Grounds; New York, NY (rivalry)	L 9–17	40,000	
November 6		St. Bonaventure	Schoellkopf Field; Ithaca, NY	W 41–0		
November 13		Dartmouth	Schoellkopf Field; Ithaca, NY (rivalry)	W 24–23		
November 25		at Penn	Franklin Field; Philadelphia, PA (rivalry)	T 10–10		
All times are in Eastern time
