= Frank Briante =

American football player (1905–1996)

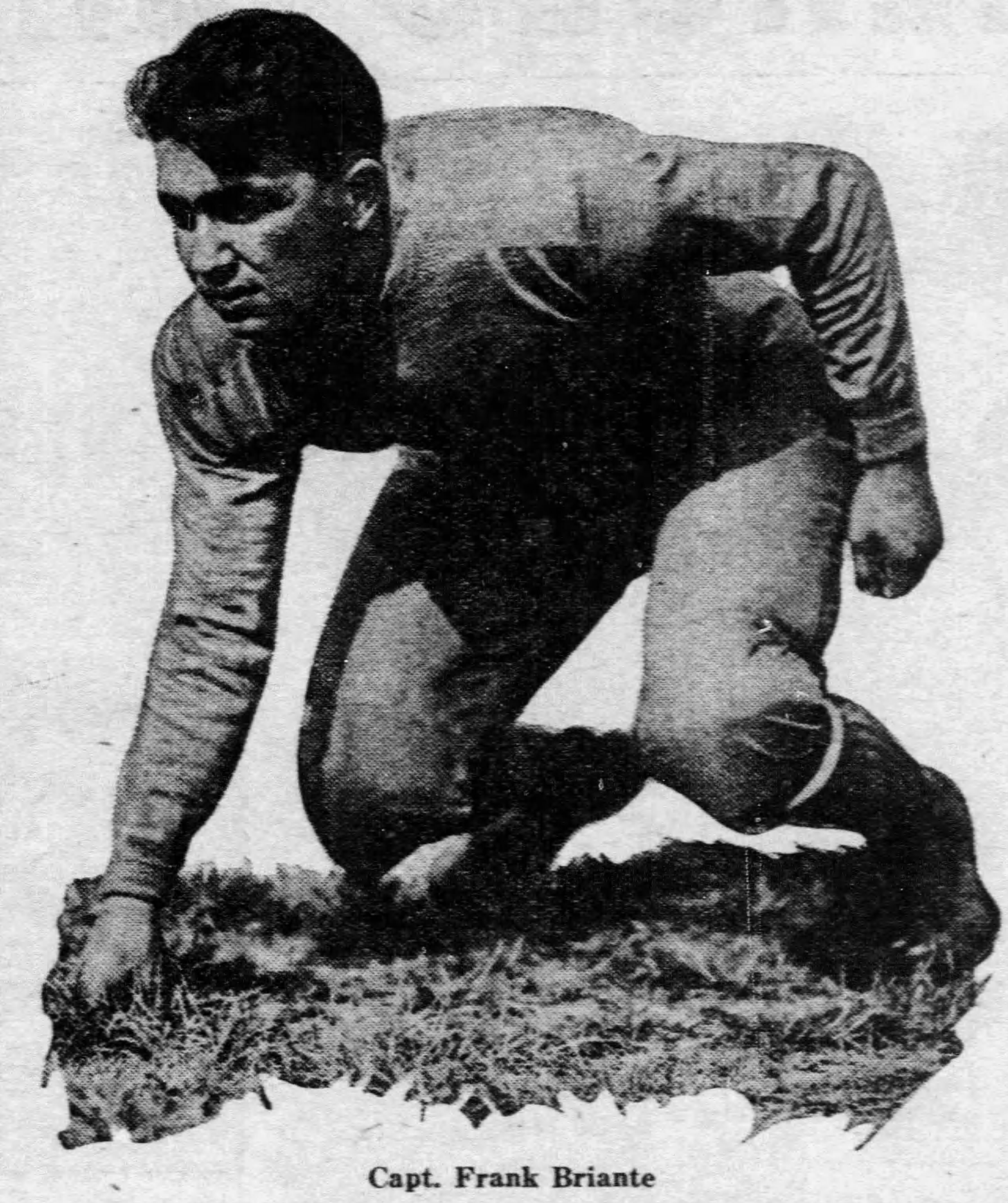
- Frank Briante, 1926

No. 42
- Position: Halfback

Personal information
- Born: March 5, 1905; White Plains, New York
- Died: May 26, 1996 (aged 91); White Plains, New York
- Listed height: 5 ft 10 in (1.78 m)
- Listed weight: 185 lb (84 kg)

Career information
- High school: White Plains (NY)
- College: NYU

Career history
- Staten Island Stapletons (1929); Newark Tornadoes (1930)
- Stats at Pro Football Reference

Francis Xavier Briante (March 5, 1905 – May 26, 1996) was an American football player.

Briante was born in 1905 in White Plains, New York, and attended White Plains High School.

He attended New York University and played for the NYU Violets football team from 1924 to 1927. He received an engineering degree from NYU in 1928. He played at the fullback position and was captain of the 1926 NYU Violets football team that compiled an 8–1 record. As a senior in 1927, he rushed for 1,281 yards, breaking Red Grange's single-season collegiate rushing record.

He played professional football in the National Football League (NFL) as a halfback, quarterback, and fullback for the Staten Island Stapletons (1929) and Newark Tornadoes (1930). He appeared in 13 NFL games, 10 as a starter. He scored two touchdowns.

After his football career ended, Briante worked for 50 years for the Colonial Sand and Stone Co., ending his career there as a vice president and general manager. He also served for 10 years on the White Plains Board of Education and was president of the Board for seven years. He died in 1996 at age 91 at his home in White Plains.
