= 1926 Columbia Lions football team =

American college football season

1926 Columbia Lions football
- Conference: Independent
- Record: 6–3
- Head coach: Charles Crowley (2nd season)
- Captain: William Madden
- Home stadium: Baker Field, Polo Grounds

1926 Eastern college football independents records
	Conf.			Overall
Team	W	L	T	W		L		T
No. 5 Lafayette		–		9	–	0	–	0
No. 10 Brown		–		9	–	0	–	1
NYU		–		8	–	1	–	0
No. 9 Army		–		7	–	1	–	1
Washington & Jefferson		–		7	–	1	–	1
Boston College		–		6	–	0	–	2
No. 10 Penn		–		7	–	1	–	1
Cornell		–		6	–	1	–	1
Princeton		–		5	–	1	–	1
Carnegie Tech		–		7	–	2	–	0
Springfield		–		6	–	2	–	0
Syracuse		–		7	–	2	–	1
Villanova		–		6	–	2	–	1
Colgate		–		5	–	2	–	2
Columbia		–		6	–	3	–	0
Pittsburgh		–		5	–	2	–	2
CCNY		–		5	–	3	–	0
Temple		–		5	–	3	–	0
Penn State		–		5	–	4	–	0
Tufts		–		4	–	4	–	0
Yale		–		4	–	4	–	0
Bucknell		–		4	–	5	–	1
Fordham		–		3	–	4	–	1
Harvard		–		3	–	5	–	0
Rutgers		–		3	–	6	–	0
Vermont		–		3	–	6	–	0
Drexel		–		2	–	5	–	0
Boston University		–		2	–	6	–	0
Lehigh		–		1	–	8	–	0
Franklin & Marshall		–		0	–	8	–	1
Rankings from Dickinson System

The 1926 Columbia Lions football team was an American football team that represented Columbia University as an independent during the 1926 college football season. In its second season under head coach Charles Crowley, the team compiled a 6–3 record and outscored opponents 144 to 73, with four shutouts. The team played home games at Baker Field and the Polo Grounds in Upper Manhattan.

== Schedule ==
Date	Time	Opponent	Site	Result	Attendance	Source
September 25		Vermont	Baker Field; New York, NY	W 14–0		
October 2		Union (NY)	Baker Field; New York, NY	W 26–0		
October 9		Wesleyan	Baker Field; New York, NY	W 41–0		
October 16		Ohio State	Polo Grounds; New York, NY	L 7–32		
October 23		Duke	Baker Field; New York, NY	W 24–0	7,000–8,000	
October 30	2:30 p.m.	Cornell	Polo Grounds; New York, NY (rivalry)	W 17–9	40,000	
November 6		William & Mary	Baker Field; New York, NY	W 13–10		
November 13		at Penn	Franklin Field; Philadelphia, PA	L 0–3		
November 25	2:00 p.m.	Syracuse	Polo Grounds; New York, NY	L 2–19	40,000	
