= 1926 CCNY Lavender football team =

American college football season

1926 CCNY Lavender football
- Conference: Independent
- Record: 5–3
- Head coach: Harold J. Parker (3rd season)
- Home stadium: Lewisohn Stadium

1926 Eastern college football independents records
	Conf.			Overall
Team	W	L	T	W		L		T
No. 5 Lafayette		–		9	–	0	–	0
No. 10 Brown		–		9	–	0	–	1
NYU		–		8	–	1	–	0
No. 9 Army		–		7	–	1	–	1
Washington & Jefferson		–		7	–	1	–	1
Boston College		–		6	–	0	–	2
No. 10 Penn		–		7	–	1	–	1
Cornell		–		6	–	1	–	1
Princeton		–		5	–	1	–	1
Carnegie Tech		–		7	–	2	–	0
Springfield		–		6	–	2	–	0
Syracuse		–		7	–	2	–	1
Villanova		–		6	–	2	–	1
Colgate		–		5	–	2	–	2
Columbia		–		6	–	3	–	0
Pittsburgh		–		5	–	2	–	2
CCNY		–		5	–	3	–	0
Temple		–		5	–	3	–	0
Penn State		–		5	–	4	–	0
Tufts		–		4	–	4	–	0
Yale		–		4	–	4	–	0
Bucknell		–		4	–	5	–	1
Fordham		–		3	–	4	–	1
Harvard		–		3	–	5	–	0
Rutgers		–		3	–	6	–	0
Vermont		–		3	–	6	–	0
Drexel		–		2	–	5	–	0
Boston University		–		2	–	6	–	0
Lehigh		–		1	–	8	–	0
Franklin & Marshall		–		0	–	8	–	1
Rankings from Dickinson System

The 1926 CCNY Lavender football team was an American football team that represented the City College of New York (CCNY) as an independent during the 1926 college football season. In their third season under Harold J. Parker, the Lavender team compiled a 5–3 record.

== Schedule ==
Date	Opponent	Site	Result	Source
September 25	CCNY alumni	Lewisohn Stadium; New York, NY	W 21–7	
October 2	at George Washington	Wilson Memorial Stadium; Washington, DC	L 7–10	
October 9	St. Lawrence	Lewisohn Stadium; New York, NY	W 20–7	
October 16	at Upsala	Ashland Stadium; East Orange, NJ	W 7–6	
October 23	Rhode Island State	Lewisohn Stadium; New York, NY	W 29–0	
November 2	Manhattan	Lewisohn Stadium; New York, NY	W 25–14	
November 6	at Haverford	Haverford, PA	L 0–6	
November 13	Fordham	Lewisohn Stadium; New York, NY	L 3–7	
