= 1926 Army Cadets football team =

American college football season

1926 Army Cadets football
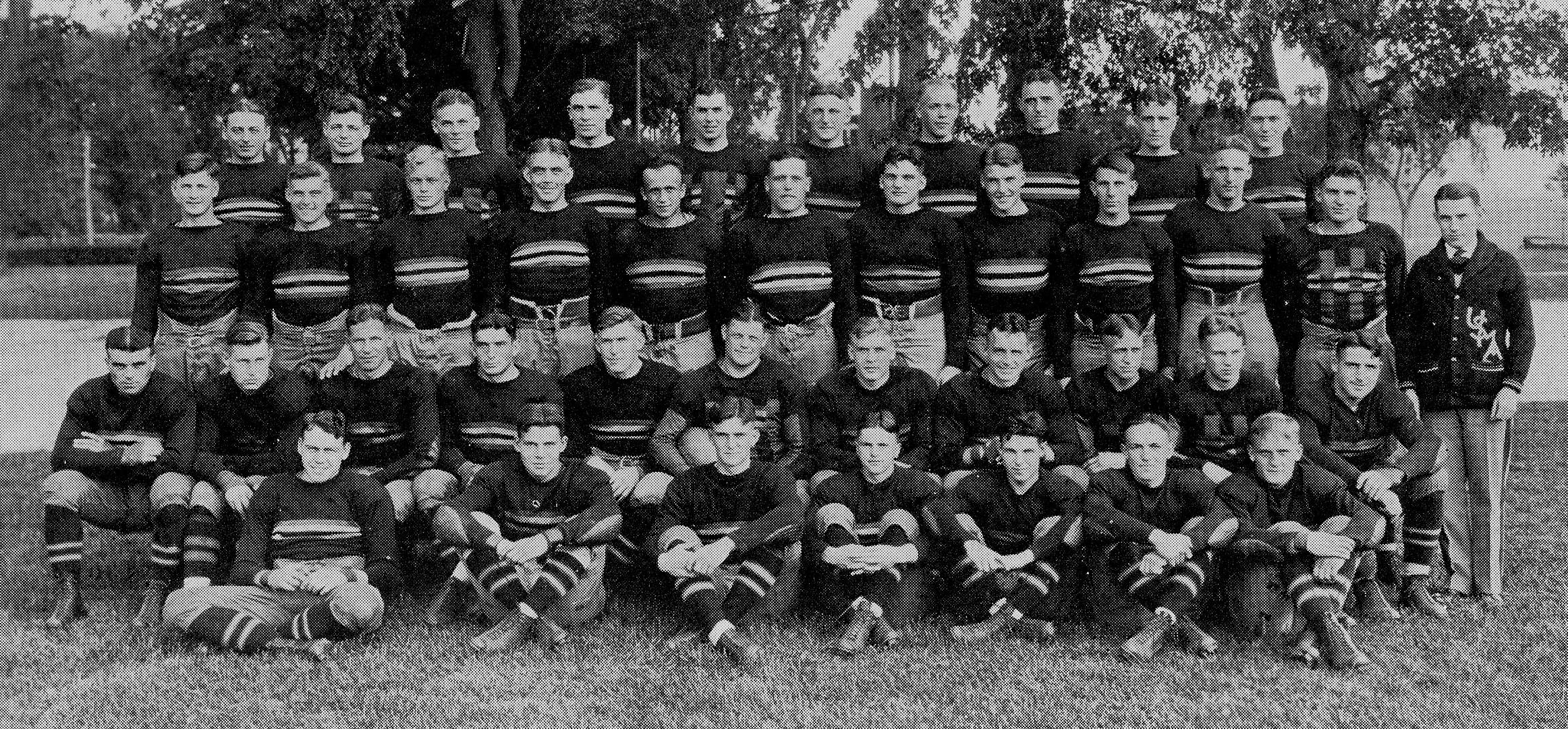
- Conference: Independent
- Record: 7–1–1
- Head coach: Biff Jones (1st season)
- Offensive scheme: Single-wing
- Captain: Orville Hewitt
- Home stadium: Michie Stadium

1926 Eastern college football independents records
	Conf.			Overall
Team	W	L	T	W		L		T
No. 5 Lafayette		–		9	–	0	–	0
No. 10 Brown		–		9	–	0	–	1
NYU		–		8	–	1	–	0
No. 9 Army		–		7	–	1	–	1
Washington & Jefferson		–		7	–	1	–	1
Boston College		–		6	–	0	–	2
No. 10 Penn		–		7	–	1	–	1
Cornell		–		6	–	1	–	1
Princeton		–		5	–	1	–	1
Carnegie Tech		–		7	–	2	–	0
Springfield		–		6	–	2	–	0
Syracuse		–		7	–	2	–	1
Villanova		–		6	–	2	–	1
Colgate		–		5	–	2	–	2
Columbia		–		6	–	3	–	0
Pittsburgh		–		5	–	2	–	2
CCNY		–		5	–	3	–	0
Temple		–		5	–	3	–	0
Penn State		–		5	–	4	–	0
Tufts		–		4	–	4	–	0
Yale		–		4	–	4	–	0
Bucknell		–		4	–	5	–	1
Fordham		–		3	–	4	–	1
Harvard		–		3	–	5	–	0
Rutgers		–		3	–	6	–	0
Vermont		–		3	–	6	–	0
Drexel		–		2	–	5	–	0
Boston University		–		2	–	6	–	0
Lehigh		–		1	–	8	–	0
Franklin & Marshall		–		0	–	8	–	1
Rankings from Dickinson System

The 1926 Army Cadets football team represented the United States Military Academy as an independent during the 1926 college football season. In their first season under head coach Biff Jones, the Cadets compiled a 7–1–1 record, shut out four of their nine opponents, and outscored all opponents by a combined total of 240 to 71. In the annual Army–Navy Game, the Cadets tied the Midshipmen at 21. The team's only loss came to Notre Dame by a 7 to 0 score. The team was ranked No. 11 in the nation in the Dickinson System ratings released in December 1926.

Four Army players were recognized on the All-America team. Tackle Bud Sprague was a consensus first-team honoree with first-team designations from the Associated Press (AP) and the Central Press Association (CP). Sprague was later inducted into the College Football Hall of Fame. Halfback Harry Wilson was selected as a first-team honoree by Walter Camp, the All-America Board, Collier's Weekly, the International News Service, and the Newspaper Enterprise Association. Guard Ernest Schmidt was selected as a first-team player by the New York Sun. Center Maurice Daly was selected as a second-team honoree by the New York Sun.

== Schedule ==
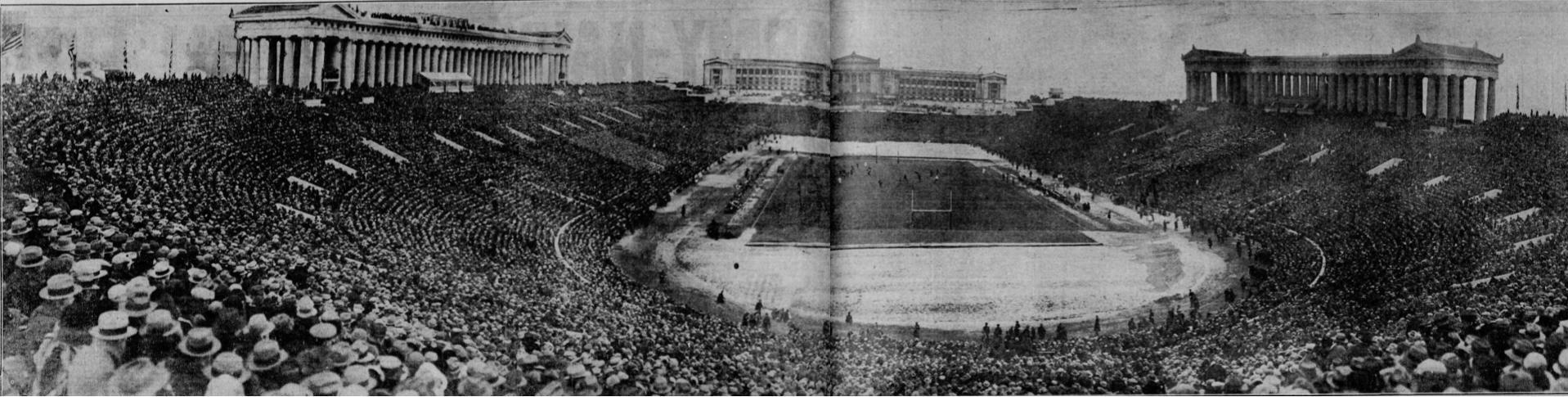
1926 Army–Navy Game at Soldier Field in Chicago

Date	Opponent	Site	Result	Attendance	Source
October 2	Detroit	Michie Stadium; West Point, NY	W 21–0		
October 9	Davis & Elkins	Michie Stadium; West Point, NY	W 21–7		
October 16	Syracuse	Michie Stadium; West Point, NY	W 27–21	20,000	
October 23	Boston University	Michie Stadium; West Point, NY	W 41–0		
October 30	at Yale	Yale Bowl; New Haven, CT	W 33–0	75,000	
November 6	Franklin & Marshall	Michie Stadium; West Point, NY	W 55–0		
November 13	vs. Notre Dame	Yankee Stadium; Bronx, NY (rivalry)	L 0–7	63,029	
November 20	Ursinus	Michie Stadium; West Point, NY	W 44–0		
November 27	vs. Navy	Soldier Field; Chicago, IL (Army–Navy Game)	T 21–21		

== Roster ==
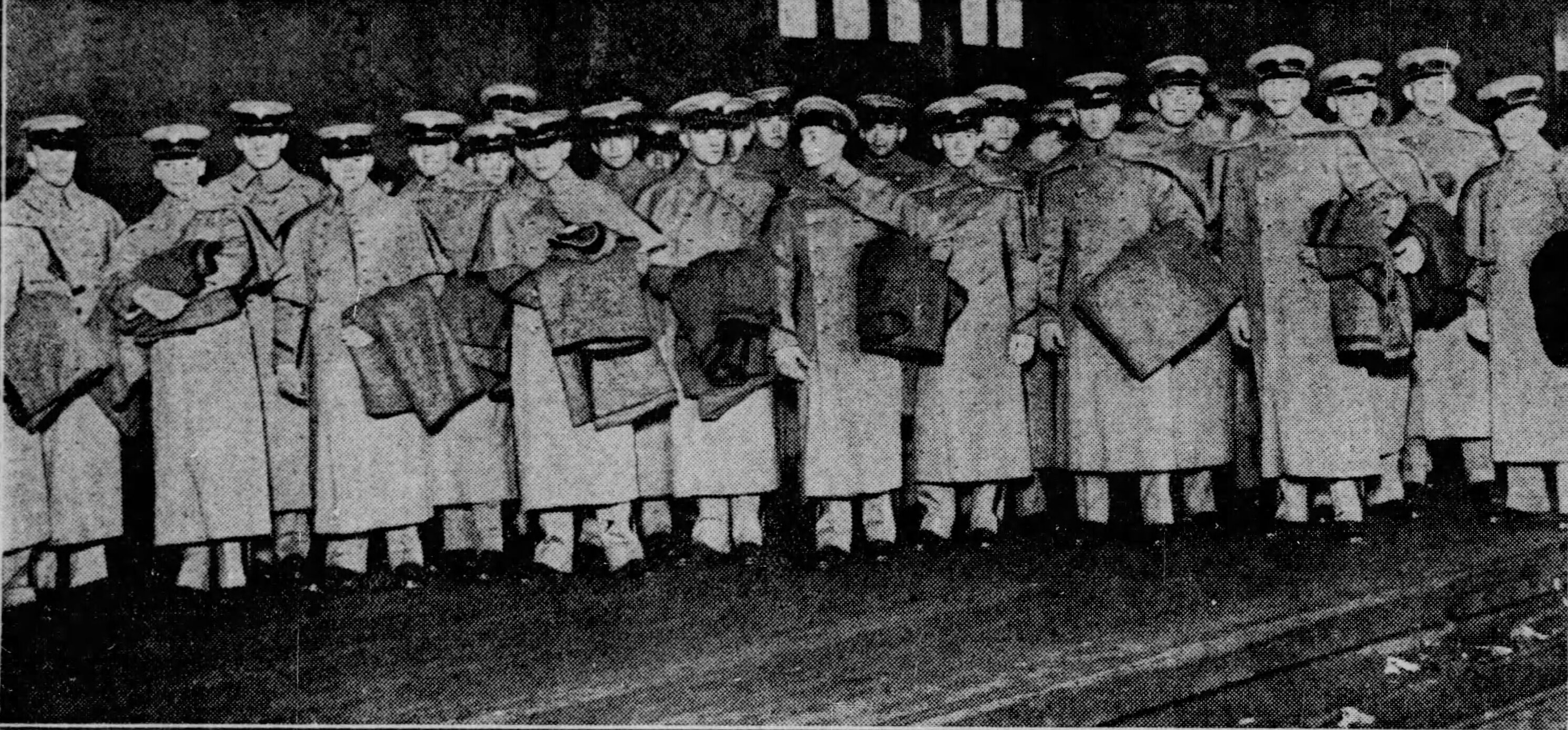
Players arrive at Chicago's Central Station ahead of the Army–Navy Game

1926 Army Cadets football team roster
Players
Coaches
Offense v|-

Pos.	#	Name	Class
HB	10	Harry Wilson	Jr
B	11	Thomas J. H. Trapnell	Sr
C	12	Maurice F. Daly
E	13	Charles F. Born	Jr
E	14	Samuel Brenthall
B	15	Clyde A. Dahl
OT	16	George W. Perry
QB	17	W. F. Hall
QB	18	D. Z. Zimmerman
G	19	Louis A. Hammack
QB	20	Neil B. Harding
C	21	E. A. Kenny
OT	22	Howard G. Bunker	Jr
QB	23	Arthur W. Meehan
B	24	C. W. Piper
E	25	G. E. Fletcher
OT	26	J. Dibb
B	27	R. C. Hutchinson
G	28	Ernest G. Schmidt
FB	30	Orville Hewitt (c)
B	31	K. M. Landon
E	32	F. L. Anderson
OT	33	Bud Sprague
E	34	Garrison H. Davidson	Jr
G	35	A. W. Schermacker
G	36	Thomas R. Lynch
E	38	Norris B. Harbold
B	39	E. O'Donnell
OT	40	LaVerne G. Saunders
HB	41	Chris "Red" Cagle	Fr
OT	42	B. C. Muse
C	43	B. R. Wimer
G	44	Lyle Seeman	Jr
B	45	A. E. Harris
E	52	C. B. Tobin
B	53	John H. Murrell
E	60	W. L. Nave
OT	64	P. Elias
B	77	Joseph H. Gilbreth
OT	80	F. B. Connor
E	87	H. L. Flood
HB	88	J.K. Cunningham
HB	91	J. L. Beynon
E	97	S. I. Simonton
G	99	F. G. Waldrop

Defense

Pos.	#	Name	Class

Special teams

Pos.	#	Name	Class

Head coach

Coordinators/assistant coaches

Legend

- (C) Team captain
- (S) Suspended
- (I) Ineligible
- Injured
- Redshirt

Roster

College Football Hall of Fame inductees: Red Cagle, Bud Sprague, Harry Wilson

== Coaches ==
- Head coach: Biff Jones
- Assistant coaches: Major Sasse, Lt. Blackshear M. Bryan, Lt. Farwick, Lt. Wood, Lt. Wicks, Lt. Myers, Lt. Johnson
- Trainer: Wandle
