= 1926 Princeton Tigers football team =

American college football season

1926 Princeton Tigers football
- Conference: Independent
- Record: 5–1–1
- Head coach: Bill Roper (13th season)
- Captain: John Davis
- Home stadium: Palmer Stadium

1926 Eastern college football independents records
	Conf.			Overall
Team	W	L	T	W		L		T
No. 5 Lafayette		–		9	–	0	–	0
No. 10 Brown		–		9	–	0	–	1
NYU		–		8	–	1	–	0
No. 9 Army		–		7	–	1	–	1
Washington & Jefferson		–		7	–	1	–	1
Boston College		–		6	–	0	–	2
No. 10 Penn		–		7	–	1	–	1
Cornell		–		6	–	1	–	1
Princeton		–		5	–	1	–	1
Carnegie Tech		–		7	–	2	–	0
Springfield		–		6	–	2	–	0
Syracuse		–		7	–	2	–	1
Villanova		–		6	–	2	–	1
Colgate		–		5	–	2	–	2
Columbia		–		6	–	3	–	0
Pittsburgh		–		5	–	2	–	2
CCNY		–		5	–	3	–	0
Temple		–		5	–	3	–	0
Penn State		–		5	–	4	–	0
Tufts		–		4	–	4	–	0
Yale		–		4	–	4	–	0
Bucknell		–		4	–	5	–	1
Fordham		–		3	–	4	–	1
Harvard		–		3	–	5	–	0
Rutgers		–		3	–	6	–	0
Vermont		–		3	–	6	–	0
Drexel		–		2	–	5	–	0
Boston University		–		2	–	6	–	0
Lehigh		–		1	–	8	–	0
Franklin & Marshall		–		0	–	8	–	1
Rankings from Dickinson System

The 1926 Princeton Tigers football team represented Princeton University in the 1926 college football season. The team finished with a 5–1–1 record under 13th-year head coach Bill Roper. The Tigers' sole loss of the season was to Navy by a 27–13 score. No Princeton players were selected as first-team honorees on the 1926 College Football All-America Team.

== Schedule ==
Date	Opponent	Site	Result	Attendance	Source
October 2	Amherst	Palmer Stadium; Princeton, NJ	W 14–7		
October 9	Washington and Lee	Palmer Stadium; Princeton, NJ	T 7–7		
October 16	Navy	Palmer Stadium; Princeton, NJ	L 13–27		
October 23	Lehigh	Palmer Stadium; Princeton, NJ	W 7–6		
October 30	Swarthmore	Palmer Stadium; Princeton, NJ	W 27–0		
November 6	at Harvard	Harvard Stadium; Boston, MA (rivalry)	W 12–0	55,000	
November 13	Yale	Palmer Stadium; Princeton, NJ (rivalry)	W 10–7	55,000	
