= 1926 Temple Owls football team =

American college football season

1926 Temple Owls football
- Conference: Independent
- Record: 5–2
- Head coach: Heinie Miller (2nd season)
- Captain: Benjamin Cresse
- Home stadium: Temple Field

1926 Eastern college football independents records
	Conf.			Overall
Team	W	L	T	W		L		T
No. 5 Lafayette		–		9	–	0	–	0
No. 10 Brown		–		9	–	0	–	1
NYU		–		8	–	1	–	0
No. 9 Army		–		7	–	1	–	1
Washington & Jefferson		–		7	–	1	–	1
Boston College		–		6	–	0	–	2
No. 10 Penn		–		7	–	1	–	1
Cornell		–		6	–	1	–	1
Princeton		–		5	–	1	–	1
Carnegie Tech		–		7	–	2	–	0
Springfield		–		6	–	2	–	0
Syracuse		–		7	–	2	–	1
Villanova		–		6	–	2	–	1
Colgate		–		5	–	2	–	2
Columbia		–		6	–	3	–	0
Pittsburgh		–		5	–	2	–	2
CCNY		–		5	–	3	–	0
Temple		–		5	–	3	–	0
Penn State		–		5	–	4	–	0
Tufts		–		4	–	4	–	0
Yale		–		4	–	4	–	0
Bucknell		–		4	–	5	–	1
Fordham		–		3	–	4	–	1
Harvard		–		3	–	5	–	0
Rutgers		–		3	–	6	–	0
Vermont		–		3	–	6	–	0
Drexel		–		2	–	5	–	0
Boston University		–		2	–	6	–	0
Lehigh		–		1	–	8	–	0
Franklin & Marshall		–		0	–	8	–	1
Rankings from Dickinson System

The 1926 Temple Owls football team was an American football team that represented Temple University as an independent during the 1926 college football season. In its second season under head coach Heinie Miller, the team compiled a 5–3 record. The team played its home games on a new field located at City Line and Vernon Road; it was known variously as Temple Field, Owl Field, or the Temple athletic field.

== Schedule ==
Date	Opponent	Site	Result	Attendance	Source
September 25	at Ursinus	Collegeville, PA	W 12–0		
October 9	Lebanon Valley	Temple Field; Philadelphia, PA	W 13–3	> 5,000	
October 16	Susquehanna	Temple Field; Philadelphia, PA	W 14–0		
October 23	Schuylkill (Note: In 1928, Schuylkill College of Reading, Pennsylvania, merged with Albright College, also located in Reading.)	Temple Field; Philadelphia, PA	W 12–0	5,000	
October 30	Albright	Temple Field; Philadelphia, PA	L 0–19	6,000	
November 6	at Muhlenberg	Allentown, PA	L 12–29		
November 11	Quantico Marines	Seski Stadium; Philadelphia, PA	L 12–42		
November 20	Washington College	Temple Field; Philadelphia, PA	W 13–0		
