= 1926 Penn State Nittany Lions football team =

American college football season

1926 Penn State Nittany Lions football
- Conference: Independent
- Record: 5–4
- Head coach: Hugo Bezdek (9th season)
- Captain: Ken Weston
- Home stadium: New Beaver Field

1926 Eastern college football independents records
	Conf.			Overall
Team	W	L	T	W		L		T
No. 5 Lafayette		–		9	–	0	–	0
No. 10 Brown		–		9	–	0	–	1
NYU		–		8	–	1	–	0
No. 9 Army		–		7	–	1	–	1
Washington & Jefferson		–		7	–	1	–	1
Boston College		–		6	–	0	–	2
No. 10 Penn		–		7	–	1	–	1
Cornell		–		6	–	1	–	1
Princeton		–		5	–	1	–	1
Carnegie Tech		–		7	–	2	–	0
Springfield		–		6	–	2	–	0
Syracuse		–		7	–	2	–	1
Villanova		–		6	–	2	–	1
Colgate		–		5	–	2	–	2
Columbia		–		6	–	3	–	0
Pittsburgh		–		5	–	2	–	2
CCNY		–		5	–	3	–	0
Temple		–		5	–	3	–	0
Penn State		–		5	–	4	–	0
Tufts		–		4	–	4	–	0
Yale		–		4	–	4	–	0
Bucknell		–		4	–	5	–	1
Fordham		–		3	–	4	–	1
Harvard		–		3	–	5	–	0
Rutgers		–		3	–	6	–	0
Vermont		–		3	–	6	–	0
Drexel		–		2	–	5	–	0
Boston University		–		2	–	6	–	0
Lehigh		–		1	–	8	–	0
Franklin & Marshall		–		0	–	8	–	1
Rankings from Dickinson System

The 1926 Penn State Nittany Lions football team represented the Pennsylvania State University as an independent during the 1926 college football season. The team was coached by Hugo Bezdek and played its home games in New Beaver Field in State College, Pennsylvania.

== Schedule ==
Date	Opponent	Site	Result	Attendance	Source
September 25	Susquehanna	New Beaver Field; State College, PA	W 82–0	3,500	
October 2	Lebanon Valley	New Beaver Field; State College, PA	W 35–0	3,500	
October 9	Marietta	New Beaver Field; State College, PA	W 48–6	4,000	
October 16	at Notre Dame	Cartier Field; Notre Dame, IN (rivalry)	L 0–28	18,000	
October 23	Syracuse^{†}	New Beaver Field; State College, PA (rivalry)	L 0–10	8,000	
October 30	George Washington	New Beaver Field; State College, PA	W 20–12	3,500	
November 6	at Penn	Franklin Field; Philadelphia, PA	L 0–3	55,000	
November 13	Bucknell	New Beaver Field; State College, PA	W 9–0	15,000	
November 25	at Pittsburgh	Pitt Stadium; Pittsburgh, PA (rivalry)	L 6–24	42,915	
^{†}Homecoming
