= Orland Smith (American football) =

American football player (1905–1977)

Profile
- Position: Tackle

Personal information
- Born: November 5, 1905; Gorham, Maine, U.S.
- Died: August 14, 1977 (aged 71); Providence, Rhode Island, U.S.
- Listed height: 5 ft 11 in (1.80 m)
- Listed weight: 215 lb (98 kg)

Career history
- Providence Steam Roller (1927–1929)

Awards and highlights
- First-team All-American (1926)
- Stats at Pro Football Reference

Orland Francis Smith (November 5, 1905 – August 14, 1977) was an American football player. He was a Brown University football hero who played both guard and tackle as one of Brown's immortal Iron Men, and in their undefeated 1926 season was named an All American by sportswriter Grantland Rice.

Smith was born in 1905 in Gorham, Maine. He was the son of Caleb and Lena (Meguier) Smith. He attended Brockton High School in Massachusetts.

After high school, he attended Brown University where he played college football from 1924 to 1926. He was selected by the Associated Press as a third-team player, and by Collier's Weekly as a second-team player, on the 1926 College Football All-America Team. When he played at defensive tackle and offensive guard for Brown University he was described in December 1926 as "fast and aggressive" and "one of the fastest and most versatile forwards of the year." In later years he served as an alumni trustee of Brown University.

Smith also played at the tackle position in the National Football League (NFL) for the Providence Steam Roller from 1927 to 1929. He appeared in 31 NFL games, 15 of them as a starter. Smith played for the Providence Steam Roller to pay his way through medical school at Boston University. He helped the Providence Steam Roller team drive to a World championship in 1928. Smith attended medical school during the week while playing in the NFL on Sundays. He graduated from Medical School in 1931 and served his internship at Somerville (Mass) Hospital and later at Rhode Island and Lying-In Hospitals.

In 1940, Dr. Smith began what became a four-year effort to get into the armed forces. Finally, in 1944, after much repeated physical exams and much red tape, he was commissioned a Lieutenant Commander in the Navy. He served in the Pacific aboard the ship Bountiful being just offshore in the hospital ship at major battles on Guam, Saipan, Leyte Gulf, Iwo Jima and Okinawa.

Dr. Smith had a 45 year surgical career in Rhode Island. He served his residency in surgery at both Rhode Island Hospital and Brockton (Mass) Hospital. He served as Chief of Surgery at Memorial Hospital in Pawtucket (1954 - 1964) and Notre Dame Hospital in Central Falls. He was also on the consulting staff of several hospitals in Rhode Island and maintained (2) private practice offices on Angell St., Providence, RI and in Pawtucket. He was a member of the International College of Surgeons, the New England and the Providence Surgical Societies, and the Rhode Island and Pawtucket Medical Societies. He was as well known in sports circles as he was in the operating room.

Dr. Smith was the husband of Mary (Norton) Smith and lived on Sweet Road in the Georgiaville section of Smithfield, Rhode Island. Until 1945 he also maintained a small gentleman's farm in Chepachet for many years.

Smith died on August 14, 1977 in the Jane Brown Unit of Rhode Island Hospital, Providence, Rhode Island.
