= 1926 Springfield Red and White football team =

American college football season

1926 Springfield Red and White football
- Conference: Independent
- Record: 6–2
- Head coach: John L. Rothacher (3rd season)
- Captain: J. Kenneth Hafner
- Home stadium: Pratt Field

1926 Eastern college football independents records
	Conf.			Overall
Team	W	L	T	W		L		T
No. 5 Lafayette		–		9	–	0	–	0
No. 10 Brown		–		9	–	0	–	1
NYU		–		8	–	1	–	0
No. 9 Army		–		7	–	1	–	1
Washington & Jefferson		–		7	–	1	–	1
Boston College		–		6	–	0	–	2
No. 10 Penn		–		7	–	1	–	1
Cornell		–		6	–	1	–	1
Princeton		–		5	–	1	–	1
Carnegie Tech		–		7	–	2	–	0
Springfield		–		6	–	2	–	0
Syracuse		–		7	–	2	–	1
Villanova		–		6	–	2	–	1
Colgate		–		5	–	2	–	2
Columbia		–		6	–	3	–	0
Pittsburgh		–		5	–	2	–	2
CCNY		–		5	–	3	–	0
Temple		–		5	–	3	–	0
Penn State		–		5	–	4	–	0
Tufts		–		4	–	4	–	0
Yale		–		4	–	4	–	0
Bucknell		–		4	–	5	–	1
Fordham		–		3	–	4	–	1
Harvard		–		3	–	5	–	0
Rutgers		–		3	–	6	–	0
Vermont		–		3	–	6	–	0
Drexel		–		2	–	5	–	0
Boston University		–		2	–	6	–	0
Lehigh		–		1	–	8	–	0
Franklin & Marshall		–		0	–	8	–	1
Rankings from Dickinson System

The 1926 Springfield Red and White football team was an American football team that represented Springfield College as an independent during the 1926 college football season. Led by third-year head coach John L. Rothacher, Springfield compiled a record of 6–2.

== Schedule ==
Date	Time	Opponent	Site	Result	Source
October 2		Manhattan	Pratt Field; Springfield, MA	L 0–3	
October 9		at RPI	Troy, NY	W 7–0	
October 16		Delaware	Pratt Field; Springfield, MA	L 0–3	
October 23		New Hampshire	Pratt Field; Springfield, MA	W 24–14	
October 30	2:30 p.m.	at Boston University	Fenway Park; Boston, MA	W 10–3	
November 6		Massachusetts	Pratt Field; Springfield, MA	W 9–0	
November 13		Norwich	Pratt Field; Springfield, MA	W 9–7	
November 25		Vermont	Pratt Field; Springfield, MA	W 2–0	
All times are in Eastern time
