= 1926 Lehigh Brown and White football team =

American college football season

1926 Lehigh Brown and White football
- Conference: Independent
- Record: 1–8
- Head coach: Percy Wendell (2nd season)
- Home stadium: Taylor Stadium

1926 Eastern college football independents records
	Conf.			Overall
Team	W	L	T	W		L		T
No. 5 Lafayette		–		9	–	0	–	0
No. 10 Brown		–		9	–	0	–	1
NYU		–		8	–	1	–	0
No. 9 Army		–		7	–	1	–	1
Washington & Jefferson		–		7	–	1	–	1
Boston College		–		6	–	0	–	2
No. 10 Penn		–		7	–	1	–	1
Cornell		–		6	–	1	–	1
Princeton		–		5	–	1	–	1
Carnegie Tech		–		7	–	2	–	0
Springfield		–		6	–	2	–	0
Syracuse		–		7	–	2	–	1
Villanova		–		6	–	2	–	1
Colgate		–		5	–	2	–	2
Columbia		–		6	–	3	–	0
Pittsburgh		–		5	–	2	–	2
CCNY		–		5	–	3	–	0
Temple		–		5	–	3	–	0
Penn State		–		5	–	4	–	0
Tufts		–		4	–	4	–	0
Yale		–		4	–	4	–	0
Bucknell		–		4	–	5	–	1
Fordham		–		3	–	4	–	1
Harvard		–		3	–	5	–	0
Rutgers		–		3	–	6	–	0
Vermont		–		3	–	6	–	0
Drexel		–		2	–	5	–	0
Boston University		–		2	–	6	–	0
Lehigh		–		1	–	8	–	0
Franklin & Marshall		–		0	–	8	–	1
Rankings from Dickinson System

The 1926 Lehigh Brown and White football team was an American football team that represented Lehigh University as an independent during the 1926 college football season. In its second season under head coach Percy Wendell, the team compiled a 1–8 record and was outscored by a total of 168 to 32. Lehigh played home games at Taylor Stadium in Bethlehem, Pennsylvania.

== Schedule ==
Date	Opponent	Site	Result	Attendance	Source
September 25	St. John's	Taylor Stadium; Bethlehem, PA	L 0–7		
October 2	Gettysburg	Taylor Stadium; Bethlehem, PA	L 6–15		
October 9	at Brown	Brown Stadium; Providence, RI	L 0–32		
October 16	Quantico Marines	Taylor Stadium; Bethlehem, PA	L 0–14		
October 23	at Princeton	Palmer Stadium; Princeton, NJ	L 6–7		
October 30	Muhlenberg	Taylor Stadium; Bethlehem, PA	L 6–31		
November 6	at Bucknell	Lewisburg, PA	L 0–27	10,000	
November 13	Rutgers	Taylor Stadium; Bethlehem, PA	W 14–0		
November 20	at Lafayette	Fisher Stadium; Easton, PA (rivalry)	L 0–35		
