= 1926 Syracuse Orangemen football team =

American college football season

1926 Syracuse Orangemen football
- Conference: Independent
- Record: 7–2–1
- Head coach: Pete Reynolds (2nd season)
- Captain: Vic Hanson
- Home stadium: Archbold Stadium

1926 Eastern college football independents records
	Conf.			Overall
Team	W	L	T	W		L		T
No. 5 Lafayette		–		9	–	0	–	0
No. 10 Brown		–		9	–	0	–	1
NYU		–		8	–	1	–	0
No. 9 Army		–		7	–	1	–	1
Washington & Jefferson		–		7	–	1	–	1
Boston College		–		6	–	0	–	2
No. 10 Penn		–		7	–	1	–	1
Cornell		–		6	–	1	–	1
Princeton		–		5	–	1	–	1
Carnegie Tech		–		7	–	2	–	0
Springfield		–		6	–	2	–	0
Syracuse		–		7	–	2	–	1
Villanova		–		6	–	2	–	1
Colgate		–		5	–	2	–	2
Columbia		–		6	–	3	–	0
Pittsburgh		–		5	–	2	–	2
CCNY		–		5	–	3	–	0
Temple		–		5	–	3	–	0
Penn State		–		5	–	4	–	0
Tufts		–		4	–	4	–	0
Yale		–		4	–	4	–	0
Bucknell		–		4	–	5	–	1
Fordham		–		3	–	4	–	1
Harvard		–		3	–	5	–	0
Rutgers		–		3	–	6	–	0
Vermont		–		3	–	6	–	0
Drexel		–		2	–	5	–	0
Boston University		–		2	–	6	–	0
Lehigh		–		1	–	8	–	0
Franklin & Marshall		–		0	–	8	–	1
Rankings from Dickinson System

The 1926 Syracuse Orangemen football team represented Syracuse University as an independent during the 1926 college football season.

== Schedule ==
Date	Time	Opponent	Site	Result	Attendance	Source
September 25		Hobart	Archbold Stadium; Syracuse, NY	W 18–0		
October 2		Vermont	Archbold Stadium; Syracuse, NY	W 62–0	10,000	
October 9		William & Mary	Archbold Stadium; Syracuse, NY	W 35–0	12,000	
October 16		at Army	Michie Stadium; West Point, NY	L 21–27	20,000	
October 23		at Penn State	New Beaver Field; State College, PA (rivalry)	W 10–0	15,000	
October 30		Johns Hopkins	Archbold Stadium; Syracuse, NY	W 31–0	200	
November 6		Georgetown	Archbold Stadium; Syracuse, NY	L 7–13	18,000	
November 13		Colgate	Archbold Stadium; Syracuse, NY (rivalry)	T 10–10	33,000	
November 20		Niagara	Archbold Stadium; Syracuse, NY	W 12–7		
November 25	2:00 p.m.	at Columbia	Polo Grounds; New York, NY	W 19–2	40,000	
All times are in Eastern time
