= 1926 Bucknell Bison football team =

American college football season

1926 Bucknell Bison football
- Conference: Independent
- Record: 4–5–1
- Head coach: Charley Moran (3rd season)
- Home stadium: Memorial Stadium

1926 Eastern college football independents records
	Conf.			Overall
Team	W	L	T	W		L		T
No. 5 Lafayette		–		9	–	0	–	0
No. 10 Brown		–		9	–	0	–	1
NYU		–		8	–	1	–	0
No. 9 Army		–		7	–	1	–	1
Washington & Jefferson		–		7	–	1	–	1
Boston College		–		6	–	0	–	2
No. 10 Penn		–		7	–	1	–	1
Cornell		–		6	–	1	–	1
Princeton		–		5	–	1	–	1
Carnegie Tech		–		7	–	2	–	0
Springfield		–		6	–	2	–	0
Syracuse		–		7	–	2	–	1
Villanova		–		6	–	2	–	1
Colgate		–		5	–	2	–	2
Columbia		–		6	–	3	–	0
Pittsburgh		–		5	–	2	–	2
CCNY		–		5	–	3	–	0
Temple		–		5	–	3	–	0
Penn State		–		5	–	4	–	0
Tufts		–		4	–	4	–	0
Yale		–		4	–	4	–	0
Bucknell		–		4	–	5	–	1
Fordham		–		3	–	4	–	1
Harvard		–		3	–	5	–	0
Rutgers		–		3	–	6	–	0
Vermont		–		3	–	6	–	0
Drexel		–		2	–	5	–	0
Boston University		–		2	–	6	–	0
Lehigh		–		1	–	8	–	0
Franklin & Marshall		–		0	–	8	–	1
Rankings from Dickinson System

The 1926 Bucknell Bison football team was an American football team that represented Bucknell University as an independent during the 1926 college football season. In its third season under head coach Charley Moran, the team compiled a 4–5–1 record.

The team played its home games at Memorial Stadium in Lewisburg, Pennsylvania.

== Schedule ==
Date	Opponent	Site	Result	Attendance	Source
September 25	Blue Ridge	Lewisburg, PA	W 53–0		
October 2	at Washington & Jefferson	Washington, PA	L 2–17		
October 9	George Washington	Memorial Stadium; Lewisburg, PA	W 13–0		
October 16	vs. Villanova	Artillery Park; Wilkes-Barre, PA	L 3–7		
October 23	at Gettysburg	Memorial Athletic Field; Gettysburg, PA	T 0–0		
October 30	at Haskell	Lawrence, KS	L 0–36		
November 6	Lehigh^{†}	Lewisburg, PA	W 27–0	10,000	
November 13	at Penn State	New Beaver Field; State College, PA	L 0–9	15,000	
November 20	Western Maryland	Lewisburg, PA	L 0–40		
November 27	vs. Dickinson	Island Field; Harrisburg, PA	W 13–6		
^{†}Homecoming
