= 1926 Rutgers Queensmen football team =

American college football season

1926 Rutgers Queensmen football
- Conference: Independent
- Record: 3–6
- Head coach: John Wallace (3rd season)
- Captain: Lester E. Hanf
- Home stadium: Neilson Field

1926 Eastern college football independents records
	Conf.			Overall
Team	W	L	T	W		L		T
No. 5 Lafayette		–		9	–	0	–	0
No. 10 Brown		–		9	–	0	–	1
NYU		–		8	–	1	–	0
No. 9 Army		–		7	–	1	–	1
Washington & Jefferson		–		7	–	1	–	1
Boston College		–		6	–	0	–	2
No. 10 Penn		–		7	–	1	–	1
Cornell		–		6	–	1	–	1
Princeton		–		5	–	1	–	1
Carnegie Tech		–		7	–	2	–	0
Springfield		–		6	–	2	–	0
Syracuse		–		7	–	2	–	1
Villanova		–		6	–	2	–	1
Colgate		–		5	–	2	–	2
Columbia		–		6	–	3	–	0
Pittsburgh		–		5	–	2	–	2
CCNY		–		5	–	3	–	0
Temple		–		5	–	3	–	0
Penn State		–		5	–	4	–	0
Tufts		–		4	–	4	–	0
Yale		–		4	–	4	–	0
Bucknell		–		4	–	5	–	1
Fordham		–		3	–	4	–	1
Harvard		–		3	–	5	–	0
Rutgers		–		3	–	6	–	0
Vermont		–		3	–	6	–	0
Drexel		–		2	–	5	–	0
Boston University		–		2	–	6	–	0
Lehigh		–		1	–	8	–	0
Franklin & Marshall		–		0	–	8	–	1
Rankings from Dickinson System

The 1926 Rutgers Queensmen football team represented Rutgers University as an independent during the 1926 college football season. In their third and final season under head coach John Wallace, the Queensmen compiled a 3–6 record and were outscored by their opponents, 134 to 49.

== Schedule ==
Date	Opponent	Site	Result	Attendance	Source
September 25	Manhattan	Neilson Field; New Brunswick, NJ	W 8–0		
October 2	Ursinus	Neilson Field; New Brunswick, NJ	W 14–0		
October 9	at Washington & Jefferson	College Field; Washington, PA	L 6–19	6,000	
October 16	Holy Cross	Neilson Field; New Brunswick, NJ	L 6–19		
October 23	at NYU	Yankee Stadium; Bronx, NY	L 0–30	20,000	
October 30	Delaware	Neilson Field; New Brunswick, NJ	W 21–0		
November 6	Lafayette	Neilson Field; New Brunswick, NJ	L 0–38		
November 13	at Lehigh	Taylor Stadium; Bethlehem, PA	L 0–14		
November 20	Swarthmore	Neilson Field; New Brunswick, NJ	L 0–13		
