= 1926 Colgate football team =

American college football season

1926 Colgate football
- Conference: Independent
- Record: 5–2–2
- Head coach: George Hauser (1st season)
- Captain: Nicholas Mehler
- Home stadium: Whitnall Field

1926 Eastern college football independents records
	Conf.			Overall
Team	W	L	T	W		L		T
No. 5 Lafayette		–		9	–	0	–	0
No. 10 Brown		–		9	–	0	–	1
NYU		–		8	–	1	–	0
No. 9 Army		–		7	–	1	–	1
Washington & Jefferson		–		7	–	1	–	1
Boston College		–		6	–	0	–	2
No. 10 Penn		–		7	–	1	–	1
Cornell		–		6	–	1	–	1
Princeton		–		5	–	1	–	1
Carnegie Tech		–		7	–	2	–	0
Springfield		–		6	–	2	–	0
Syracuse		–		7	–	2	–	1
Villanova		–		6	–	2	–	1
Colgate		–		5	–	2	–	2
Columbia		–		6	–	3	–	0
Pittsburgh		–		5	–	2	–	2
CCNY		–		5	–	3	–	0
Temple		–		5	–	3	–	0
Penn State		–		5	–	4	–	0
Tufts		–		4	–	4	–	0
Yale		–		4	–	4	–	0
Bucknell		–		4	–	5	–	1
Fordham		–		3	–	4	–	1
Harvard		–		3	–	5	–	0
Rutgers		–		3	–	6	–	0
Vermont		–		3	–	6	–	0
Drexel		–		2	–	5	–	0
Boston University		–		2	–	6	–	0
Lehigh		–		1	–	8	–	0
Franklin & Marshall		–		0	–	8	–	1
Rankings from Dickinson System

The 1926 Colgate football team was an American football team that represented Colgate University as an independent during the 1926 college football season. In its first season under head coach George Hauser, the team compiled a 5–2–2 record and outscored opponents by a total of 218 to 58. Nicholas Mehler was the team captain. The team played its home games on Whitnall Field in Hamilton, New York.

== Schedule ==
Date	Opponent	Site	Result	Attendance	Source
September 25	Hamilton	Whitnall Field; Hamilton, NY	W 19–0		
October 2	Clarkson	Whitnall Field; Hamilton, NY	W 46–0		
October 9	St. Bonaventure	Whitnall Field; Hamilton, NY	W 44–0		
October 16	at Pittsburgh	Pitt Stadium; Pittsburgh, PA	L 16–19	20,000	
October 23	at Navy	Thompson Stadium; Annapolis, MD	L 7–13	15,000	
October 30	Michigan State	Whitnall Field; Hamilton, NY	W 38–6	5,000	
November 6	Providence	Whitnall Field; Hamilton, NY	W 28–0		
November 13	at Syracuse	Archbold Stadium; Syracuse, NY (rivalry)	T 10–10	33,000	
November 27	at Brown	Andrews Field; Providence, RI	T 10–10	30,000	
