= 1926 Vermont Catamounts football team =

American college football season

1926 Vermont Catamounts football
- Conference: Independent
- Record: 3–6
- Head coach: William McAvoy (2nd season)
- Home stadium: Centennial Field

1926 Eastern college football independents records
	Conf.			Overall
Team	W	L	T	W		L		T
No. 5 Lafayette		–		9	–	0	–	0
No. 10 Brown		–		9	–	0	–	1
NYU		–		8	–	1	–	0
No. 9 Army		–		7	–	1	–	1
Washington & Jefferson		–		7	–	1	–	1
Boston College		–		6	–	0	–	2
No. 10 Penn		–		7	–	1	–	1
Cornell		–		6	–	1	–	1
Princeton		–		5	–	1	–	1
Carnegie Tech		–		7	–	2	–	0
Springfield		–		6	–	2	–	0
Syracuse		–		7	–	2	–	1
Villanova		–		6	–	2	–	1
Colgate		–		5	–	2	–	2
Columbia		–		6	–	3	–	0
Pittsburgh		–		5	–	2	–	2
CCNY		–		5	–	3	–	0
Temple		–		5	–	3	–	0
Penn State		–		5	–	4	–	0
Tufts		–		4	–	4	–	0
Yale		–		4	–	4	–	0
Bucknell		–		4	–	5	–	1
Fordham		–		3	–	4	–	1
Harvard		–		3	–	5	–	0
Rutgers		–		3	–	6	–	0
Vermont		–		3	–	6	–	0
Drexel		–		2	–	5	–	0
Boston University		–		2	–	6	–	0
Lehigh		–		1	–	8	–	0
Franklin & Marshall		–		0	–	8	–	1
Rankings from Dickinson System

The 1926 Vermont Catamounts football team was an American football team that represented the University of Vermont as an independent during the 1926 college football season. In their second year under head coach William McAvoy, the team compiled a 3–6 record. The 1926 season also marked the first as the "Catamounts" after it was selected by popular vote by the students over camel, cow and tomcat in May 1926.

== Schedule ==
Date	Opponent	Site	Result	Attendance	Source
September 25	at Columbia	Baker Field; New York, NY	L 0–14		
October 2	at Syracuse	Archbold Stadium; Syracuse, NY	L 0–62	10,000	
October 9	Clarkson	Centennial Field; Burlington, VT	W 14–7		
October 16	at Providence	Cycledrome; Providence, RI	L 0–21		
October 23	at Tufts	Tufts Oval; Medford, MA	W 14–13	4,000	
October 30	Norwich	Centennial Field; Burlington, VT	L 0–3		
November 6	RPI	Centennial Field; Burlington, VT	W 13–0		
November 13	at Middlebury	Porter Field; Middlebury, VT	L 0–13		
November 25	at Springfield (MA)	Springfield, MA	L 0–2		
