= 1926 Villanova Wildcats football team =

American college football season

1926 Villanova Wildcats football
- Conference: Independent
- Record: 6–2–1
- Head coach: Harry Stuhldreher (2nd season)
- Captain: Richard Moynihan
- Home stadium: Shibe Park

1926 Eastern college football independents records
	Conf.			Overall
Team	W	L	T	W		L		T
No. 5 Lafayette		–		9	–	0	–	0
No. 10 Brown		–		9	–	0	–	1
NYU		–		8	–	1	–	0
No. 9 Army		–		7	–	1	–	1
Washington & Jefferson		–		7	–	1	–	1
Boston College		–		6	–	0	–	2
No. 10 Penn		–		7	–	1	–	1
Cornell		–		6	–	1	–	1
Princeton		–		5	–	1	–	1
Carnegie Tech		–		7	–	2	–	0
Springfield		–		6	–	2	–	0
Syracuse		–		7	–	2	–	1
Villanova		–		6	–	2	–	1
Colgate		–		5	–	2	–	2
Columbia		–		6	–	3	–	0
Pittsburgh		–		5	–	2	–	2
CCNY		–		5	–	3	–	0
Temple		–		5	–	3	–	0
Penn State		–		5	–	4	–	0
Tufts		–		4	–	4	–	0
Yale		–		4	–	4	–	0
Bucknell		–		4	–	5	–	1
Fordham		–		3	–	4	–	1
Harvard		–		3	–	5	–	0
Rutgers		–		3	–	6	–	0
Vermont		–		3	–	6	–	0
Drexel		–		2	–	5	–	0
Boston University		–		2	–	6	–	0
Lehigh		–		1	–	8	–	0
Franklin & Marshall		–		0	–	8	–	1
Rankings from Dickinson System

The 1926 Villanova Wildcats football team represented the Villanova University during the 1926 college football season. The Wildcats team captain was Richard Moynihan.

== Schedule ==
Date	Time	Opponent	Site	Result	Source
September 25		at Lebanon Valley	Harrisburg, PA	L 12–30	
		at Canisius	Buffalo, NY	T 14–14	
October 16		vs. Bucknell	Artillery Park; Wilkes-Barre, PA	W 7–3	
October 23		Dickinson	Shibe Park; Philadelphia, PA	W 32–0	
October 30		at St. John's	Jamaica, NY	W 41–7	
November 6	2:00 p.m.	at Boston College	Braves Field; Boston, MA	L 7–19	
November 13		at John Carroll	Cleveland, OH	W 7–0	
November 20		Saint Joseph's	Shibe Park; Philadelphia, PA	W 45–0	
November 25		at Muhlenberg	Allentown, PA	W 54–0	
