= 1926 Boston College Eagles football team =

American college football season

1926 Boston College Eagles football
- Conference: Independent
- Record: 6–0–2
- Head coach: Frank Cavanaugh (8th season)
- Captain: Joe McKenney
- Home stadium: Braves Field

1926 Eastern college football independents records
	Conf.			Overall
Team	W	L	T	W		L		T
No. 5 Lafayette		–		9	–	0	–	0
No. 10 Brown		–		9	–	0	–	1
NYU		–		8	–	1	–	0
No. 9 Army		–		7	–	1	–	1
Washington & Jefferson		–		7	–	1	–	1
Boston College		–		6	–	0	–	2
No. 10 Penn		–		7	–	1	–	1
Cornell		–		6	–	1	–	1
Princeton		–		5	–	1	–	1
Carnegie Tech		–		7	–	2	–	0
Springfield		–		6	–	2	–	0
Syracuse		–		7	–	2	–	1
Villanova		–		6	–	2	–	1
Colgate		–		5	–	2	–	2
Columbia		–		6	–	3	–	0
Pittsburgh		–		5	–	2	–	2
CCNY		–		5	–	3	–	0
Temple		–		5	–	3	–	0
Penn State		–		5	–	4	–	0
Tufts		–		4	–	4	–	0
Yale		–		4	–	4	–	0
Bucknell		–		4	–	5	–	1
Fordham		–		3	–	4	–	1
Harvard		–		3	–	5	–	0
Rutgers		–		3	–	6	–	0
Vermont		–		3	–	6	–	0
Drexel		–		2	–	5	–	0
Boston University		–		2	–	6	–	0
Lehigh		–		1	–	8	–	0
Franklin & Marshall		–		0	–	8	–	1
Rankings from Dickinson System

The 1926 Boston College Eagles football team represented Boston College an independent during the 1926 college football season. Led by Frank Cavanaugh in his eighth and final season as coach, Boston College compiled a record of 6–0–2. Cavanaugh's former player, Tony Comerford, was hired as an assistant for the year. Joe McKenney was the team captain.

== Schedule ==
Date	Time	Opponent	Site	Result	Attendance	Source
October 2	2:30 p.m.	Catholic University	Braves Field; Boston, MA	W 28–0		
October 12		Fordham	Braves Field; Boston, MA	W 27–0	20,000	
October 23		at Saint Louis	Sportsman's Park; St. Louis, MO	W 61–0		
October 30	2:00 p.m.	West Virginia Wesleyan	Braves Field; Boston, MA	W 27–6		
November 6	2:00 p.m.	Villanova	Braves Field; Boston, MA	W 19–7		
November 13	2:00 p.m.	Haskell	Braves Field; Boston, MA	T 21–21		
November 20	2:00 p.m.	Gettysburg	Braves Field; Boston, MA	W 39–0		
November 27		Holy Cross	Braves Field; Boston, MA (rivalry)	T 0–0	40,000	
All times are in Eastern time
