= 1926 Harvard Crimson football team =

American college football season

1926 Harvard Crimson football
- Conference: Independent
- Record: 3–5
- Head coach: Arnold Horween (1st season)
- Captain: Clement D. Coady
- Home stadium: Harvard Stadium

Uniform
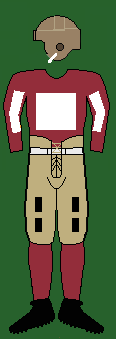

1926 Eastern college football independents records
	Conf.			Overall
Team	W	L	T	W		L		T
No. 5 Lafayette		–		9	–	0	–	0
No. 10 Brown		–		9	–	0	–	1
NYU		–		8	–	1	–	0
No. 9 Army		–		7	–	1	–	1
Washington & Jefferson		–		7	–	1	–	1
Boston College		–		6	–	0	–	2
No. 10 Penn		–		7	–	1	–	1
Cornell		–		6	–	1	–	1
Princeton		–		5	–	1	–	1
Carnegie Tech		–		7	–	2	–	0
Springfield		–		6	–	2	–	0
Syracuse		–		7	–	2	–	1
Villanova		–		6	–	2	–	1
Colgate		–		5	–	2	–	2
Columbia		–		6	–	3	–	0
Pittsburgh		–		5	–	2	–	2
CCNY		–		5	–	3	–	0
Temple		–		5	–	3	–	0
Penn State		–		5	–	4	–	0
Tufts		–		4	–	4	–	0
Yale		–		4	–	4	–	0
Bucknell		–		4	–	5	–	1
Fordham		–		3	–	4	–	1
Harvard		–		3	–	5	–	0
Rutgers		–		3	–	6	–	0
Vermont		–		3	–	6	–	0
Drexel		–		2	–	5	–	0
Boston University		–		2	–	6	–	0
Lehigh		–		1	–	8	–	0
Franklin & Marshall		–		0	–	8	–	1
Rankings from Dickinson System

The 1926 Harvard Crimson football team represented Harvard University in the 1926 college football season. In its first season under head coach Arnold Horween, Harvard compiled a 3–5 record and outscored opponents by a total of 140 to 105. Clement D. Coady was the team captain. The team played its home games at Harvard Stadium in Boston.

== Schedule ==
Date	Opponent	Site	Result	Attendance	Source
October 1	Geneva	Harvard Stadium; Boston, MA	L 7–16		
October 9	Holy Cross	Harvard Stadium; Boston, MA	L 14–19		
October 16	William & Mary	Harvard Stadium; Boston, MA	W 27–7		
October 23	Dartmouth	Harvard Stadium; Boston, MA (rivalry)	W 16–12		
October 30	Tufts	Harvard Stadium; Boston, MA	W 69–6		
November 6	Princeton	Harvard Stadium; Boston, MA (rivalry)	L 0–12	55,000	
November 13	Brown	Harvard Stadium; Boston, MA	L 0–21		
November 21	at Yale	Yale Bowl; New Haven, CT (rivalry)	L 7–12		

Program for the 1926 edition of the rivalry game between Harvard and Princeton.
