= John Bunyan (American football) =

American football player (1905–1959)

Profile
- Positions: Guard, center

Personal information
- Born: September 7, 1905; Hartford, Connecticut, U.S.
- Died: September 13, 1989 (aged 84)
- Listed height: 5 ft 10 in (1.78 m)
- Listed weight: 215 lb (98 kg)

Career information
- High school: Williston Northampton School (MA)
- College: NYU

Career history
- Staten Island Stapletons (1929-1930, 1932); Brooklyn Dodgers (1932)

John T. "Moose" Bunyan (September 7, 1905 – September 13, 1989) was an American football player.

Bunyan was born in 1905 in Hartford, Connecticut. He attended Williston Academy in Easthampton, Massachusetts. He then played college football as a guard at New York University (NYU) from 1925 to 1927.

He also played professional football in the National Football League (NFL) as a guard and center for the Staten Island Stapletons during the 1929, 1930, and 1932 seasons, and for the Brooklyn Dodgers during the 1932 season. He appeared in 23 NFL games, 20 as a starter. He was twice selected as an All-American professional guard. He also served in the U.S. Coast Guard. He played with a Coast Guard football team during his service.

After his playing career ended, Bunyan worked as a coach in Holyoke, Massachusetts.

Bunyan died in 1989 at St. Mary's House in West Hartford, Connecticut.
