= Brown University alma mater =

Traditional song of US university

Brown University traditions hold that two songs, "Alma Mater" and "Ever True to Brown", are sung at public events and gatherings related to the university. The traditional alma mater song, "Old Brown," was created in 1860 and "Ever True to Brown", the second school fight song, was written by Donald Jackson (Class of 1909). The song is played by the Brown Band at major varsity athletic events and at formal events such as Convocation and Commencement. An unofficial version offers humorous alternative lyrics.

== "Alma Mater" ==
Brown University's traditional alma mater was written by James Andrews DeWolf (Class of 1861) in 1860. He titled it "Old Brown" and set it to the tune of Araby's Daughter. The melody was popular among the student body and adapted to fit The Old Oaken Bucket, a poem by Samuel Woodworth. Speaking of his choice of tune, DeWolf wrote, "I felt that it would be useless to hope for popularity and currency for anything that I might writ unless I adapted it to some well-known air." DeWolf's song ultimately departed from Araby's Daughter's in its key, time, and lyrics. As transcribed in 1908, the song is written in 3/8 time in the key of G.

According to the Encyclopedia Brunoniana, the song was first published in the November 1860 edition of "Brown Paper." This date is questioned in a 2006 paper which notes that the Brown University Library's 1860 materials do not include any record of the song. At the time of its original publication, the song was met with a tepid reception among the student body.

The song enjoyed a rediscovery in 1869 when the president of Brown's newly established glee club discovered a copy of the lyrics and performed the tune at a June 14 concert. The concert program rechristened the song as "Alma Mater," after the incipit. Commencement programs began including performances of "Alma Mater" in 1874, and continued to do so regularly until 1964.

Like Macbeth, members of the Brown Band do not refer to the song by name before and during performances. Instead, they use the euphemism "that song."

=== "Alma Mater 250" ===
In 2015, the chair of Brown's music department, Butch Rovan, composed "Alma Mater 250," a rearrangement of the original song that integrated rap lyrics by Sebastián Otero and R&B elements. The song was performed at Brown's 247th Commencement on May 24, 2015, by graduates of Brown's MFA in Acting and Directing program.

== "Ever True to Brown" ==
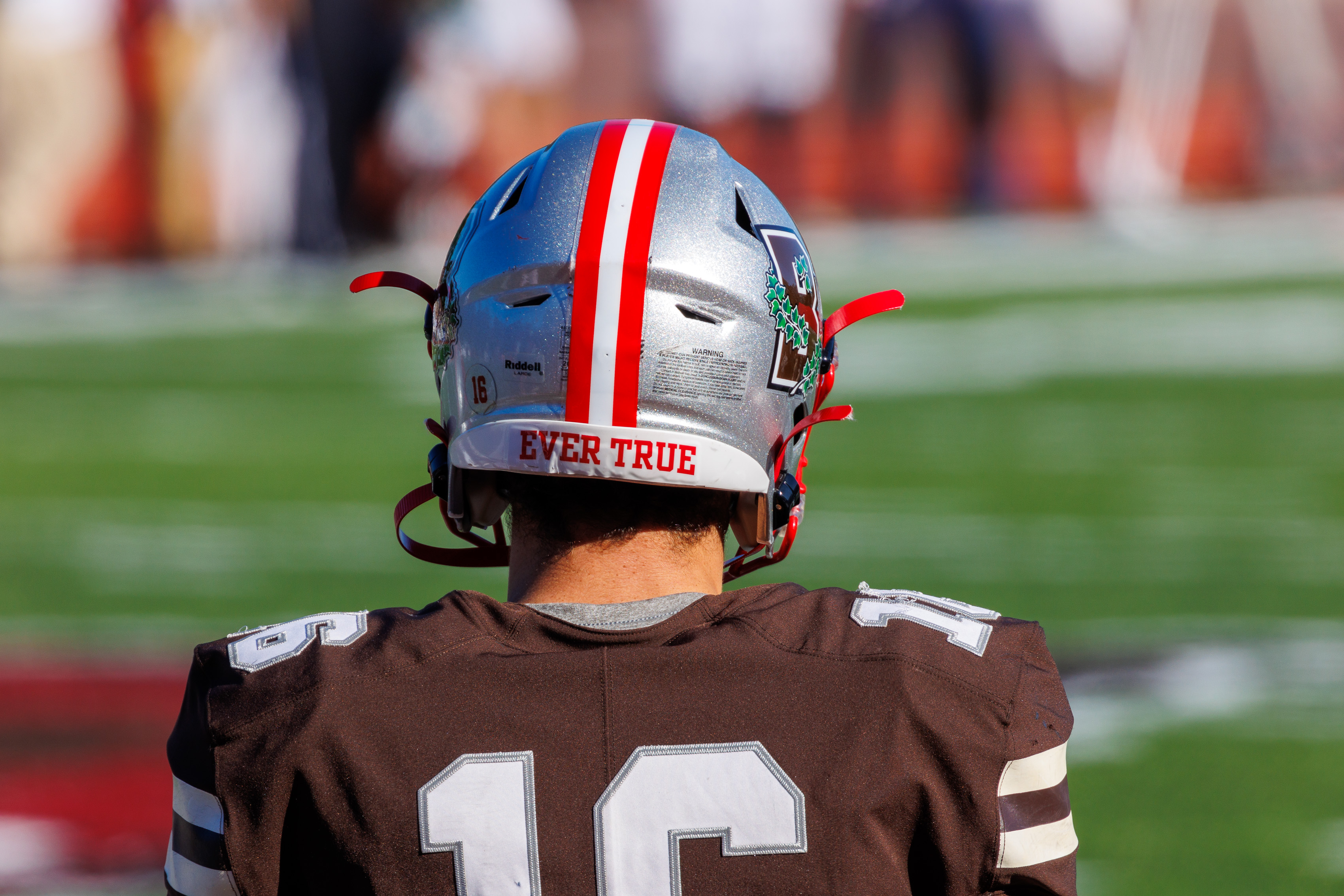
The rear of the Brown Bears football helmet is inscribed with the words "Ever True"

"Ever True to Brown," the university's fight song, was written by Donald Jackson in 1905. In the 1950s, a group of upperclassmen termed the "Vigilance Committee" would require freshmen to sing the fight song prior to entering the Sharpe Refectory. In the late 1960s, after the Brown Band became co-ed, the lyric "You can’t outshine Brown men" was amended to include "and women." The melody of "Ever True to Brown" is also used by "For Washburn and Her Team," the fight song of Washburn University in Kansas.

The song is the namesake of education software start-up EverTrue and investment network Evertrue Ventures.
