= 1926 Yale Bulldogs football team =

American college football season

1926 Yale Bulldogs football
- Conference: Independent
- Record: 4–4
- Head coach: Tad Jones (9th season)
- Offensive scheme: Single-wing
- Captain: Philip W. Bunnell
- Home stadium: Yale Bowl

1926 Eastern college football independents records
	Conf.			Overall
Team	W	L	T	W		L		T
No. 5 Lafayette		–		9	–	0	–	0
No. 10 Brown		–		9	–	0	–	1
NYU		–		8	–	1	–	0
No. 9 Army		–		7	–	1	–	1
Washington & Jefferson		–		7	–	1	–	1
Boston College		–		6	–	0	–	2
No. 10 Penn		–		7	–	1	–	1
Cornell		–		6	–	1	–	1
Princeton		–		5	–	1	–	1
Carnegie Tech		–		7	–	2	–	0
Springfield		–		6	–	2	–	0
Syracuse		–		7	–	2	–	1
Villanova		–		6	–	2	–	1
Colgate		–		5	–	2	–	2
Columbia		–		6	–	3	–	0
Pittsburgh		–		5	–	2	–	2
CCNY		–		5	–	3	–	0
Temple		–		5	–	3	–	0
Penn State		–		5	–	4	–	0
Tufts		–		4	–	4	–	0
Yale		–		4	–	4	–	0
Bucknell		–		4	–	5	–	1
Fordham		–		3	–	4	–	1
Harvard		–		3	–	5	–	0
Rutgers		–		3	–	6	–	0
Vermont		–		3	–	6	–	0
Drexel		–		2	–	5	–	0
Boston University		–		2	–	6	–	0
Lehigh		–		1	–	8	–	0
Franklin & Marshall		–		0	–	8	–	1
Rankings from Dickinson System

The 1926 Yale Bulldogs football team represented Yale University in the 1926 college football season. The Bulldogs finished with a 4–4 record under ninth-year head coach Tad Jones.

Neither the Associated Press nor Collier's Weekly selected any Yale players for their 1926 College Football All-America Teams. However, Yale guard Herbert Sturhahn was named a first-team All-American for 1926 by the All-American Board composed of three coaches, Knute Rockne, Glenn Scobey Warner and Yale's Tad Jones. Sturhahn was also later inducted into the College Football Hall of Fame.

== Schedule ==
Date	Opponent	Site	Result	Attendance	Source
October 2	Boston University	Yale Bowl; New Haven, CT	W 51–0		
October 9	Georgia	Yale Bowl; New Haven, CT	W 19–0		
October 16	Dartmouth	Yale Bowl; New Haven, CT	W 14–7	55,000	
October 23	Brown	Yale Bowl; New Haven, CT	L 0–7		
October 30	Army	Yale Bowl; New Haven, CT	L 0–33	75,000	
November 6	Maryland	Yale Bowl; New Haven, CT	L 0–15		
November 13	at Princeton	Palmer Stadium; Princeton, NJ (rivalry)	L 7–10	55,000	
November 20	Harvard	Yale Bowl; New Haven, CT (rivalry)	W 12–7		
