= Dave Skudin =

American football player and coach (1905–1972)

Profile
- Positions: Guard, end

Personal information
- Born: January 21, 1905; Brooklyn, U.S.
- Died: April 13, 1972 (aged 67); New York City, U.S.
- Listed height: 5 ft 11 in (1.80 m)
- Listed weight: 195 lb (88 kg)

Career information
- High school: Erasmus Hall (NY)
- College: NYU

Career history
- Staten Island Stapletons (1929)

Career statistics
- Games: 6

Harry David Skudin (January 21, 1905 – April 13, 1972) was an American football player and coach.

Skudin was born in 1905 in Brooklyn. He attended Erasmus Hall High School where he played football, baseball, and basketball. He then enrolled at New York University where he played at the tackle and guard positions for the NYU Violets football team from 1924 to 1926. In 1935, he was selected as a starting guard on NYU's all-time football team.

After graduating in 1927, he joined Chick Meehan's coaching staff at NYU. In 1928, he was hired as the head football coach at his alma mater, Erasmus Hall.

In 1929, he played professional football in the National Football League (NFL) for the Staten Island Stapletons. He appeared in six NFL games, all as a starter.

After retiring from football, Skudin lived in El Paso, Texas, for 12 years during which time he worked for Aaronson Brothers. In later years, he was an executive with clothing manufacturing company. He died in 1972 at a Manhattan nursing home.
