= 1926 Penn Quakers football team =

American college football season

1926 Penn Quakers football
- Conference: Independent
- Record: 7–1–1
- Head coach: Lou Young (4th season)
- Captain: George Thayer
- Home stadium: Franklin Field

1926 Eastern college football independents records
	Conf.			Overall
Team	W	L	T	W		L		T
No. 5 Lafayette		–		9	–	0	–	0
No. 10 Brown		–		9	–	0	–	1
NYU		–		8	–	1	–	0
No. 9 Army		–		7	–	1	–	1
Washington & Jefferson		–		7	–	1	–	1
Boston College		–		6	–	0	–	2
No. 10 Penn		–		7	–	1	–	1
Cornell		–		6	–	1	–	1
Princeton		–		5	–	1	–	1
Carnegie Tech		–		7	–	2	–	0
Springfield		–		6	–	2	–	0
Syracuse		–		7	–	2	–	1
Villanova		–		6	–	2	–	1
Colgate		–		5	–	2	–	2
Columbia		–		6	–	3	–	0
Pittsburgh		–		5	–	2	–	2
CCNY		–		5	–	3	–	0
Temple		–		5	–	3	–	0
Penn State		–		5	–	4	–	0
Tufts		–		4	–	4	–	0
Yale		–		4	–	4	–	0
Bucknell		–		4	–	5	–	1
Fordham		–		3	–	4	–	1
Harvard		–		3	–	5	–	0
Rutgers		–		3	–	6	–	0
Vermont		–		3	–	6	–	0
Drexel		–		2	–	5	–	0
Boston University		–		2	–	6	–	0
Lehigh		–		1	–	8	–	0
Franklin & Marshall		–		0	–	8	–	1
Rankings from Dickinson System

The 1926 Penn Quakers football team was an American football team that represented the University of Pennsylvania as an independent during the 1926 college football season. In their fourth season under head coach Lou Young, the Quakers compiled a 7–1–1 record, shut out six of nine opponents, and outscored all opponents by a total of 204 to 20. The team played its home games at Franklin Field in Philadelphia.

== Schedule ==
Date	Opponent	Site	Result	Attendance	Source
September 25	Franklin & Marshall	Franklin Field; Philadelphia, PA	W 41–0		
October 2	Johns Hopkins	Franklin Field; Philadelphia, PA	W 40–7		
October 9	Swarthmore	Franklin Field; Philadelphia, PA	W 44–0		
October 16	Chicago	Franklin Field; Philadelphia, PA	W 27–0	40,000	
October 23	Williams	Franklin Field; Philadelphia, PA	W 36–0		
October 30	at Illinois	Memorial Stadium; Champaign, IL	L 0–3		
November 6	Penn State	Franklin Field; Philadelphia, PA	W 3–0	55,000	
November 13	Columbia	Franklin Field; Philadelphia, PA	W 3–0		
November 25	Cornell	Franklin Field; Philadelphia, PA (rivalry)	T 10–10		
