= 1926 Drexel Dragons football team =

American college football season

1926 Drexel Dragons football
- Conference: Independent
- Record: 2–5
- Head coach: Ollie W. Reed (1st season)
- Captain: Sukin
- Home stadium: 46th and Haverford Ave

1926 Eastern college football independents records
	Conf.			Overall
Team	W	L	T	W		L		T
No. 5 Lafayette		–		9	–	0	–	0
No. 10 Brown		–		9	–	0	–	1
NYU		–		8	–	1	–	0
No. 9 Army		–		7	–	1	–	1
Washington & Jefferson		–		7	–	1	–	1
Boston College		–		6	–	0	–	2
No. 10 Penn		–		7	–	1	–	1
Cornell		–		6	–	1	–	1
Princeton		–		5	–	1	–	1
Carnegie Tech		–		7	–	2	–	0
Springfield		–		6	–	2	–	0
Syracuse		–		7	–	2	–	1
Villanova		–		6	–	2	–	1
Colgate		–		5	–	2	–	2
Columbia		–		6	–	3	–	0
Pittsburgh		–		5	–	2	–	2
CCNY		–		5	–	3	–	0
Temple		–		5	–	3	–	0
Penn State		–		5	–	4	–	0
Tufts		–		4	–	4	–	0
Yale		–		4	–	4	–	0
Bucknell		–		4	–	5	–	1
Fordham		–		3	–	4	–	1
Harvard		–		3	–	5	–	0
Rutgers		–		3	–	6	–	0
Vermont		–		3	–	6	–	0
Drexel		–		2	–	5	–	0
Boston University		–		2	–	6	–	0
Lehigh		–		1	–	8	–	0
Franklin & Marshall		–		0	–	8	–	1
Rankings from Dickinson System

The 1926 Drexel Dragons football team represented Drexel Institute of Art, Science, and Industry—now known as Drexel University—in the 1926 college football season. The team was led by Ollie W. Reed in his first and only season as head coach.

== Schedule ==
Date	Time	Opponent	Site	Result	Source
September 25		at Georgetown	American League Park; Washington, DC	L 0–42	
October 2		at Delaware	Frazer Field; Newark, DE	W 7–6	
October 9		Susquehanna	Drexel Field; Philadelphia, PA (First game at Drexel Field)	L 21–0	
October 16		Seton Hall	Philadelphia, PA	Canceled	
October 23		at Upsala	Ashland Stadium; East Orange, NJ	W 16–0	
October 30		Saint Joseph's	Philadelphia, PA	L 0–7	
November 6	2:00 pm	New York Aggies	Philadelphia, PA	L 3–6	
November 13	3:00 pm	at Haverford	Haverford, PA	L 0–39	
All times are in Eastern time

== Roster ==
1926 Drexel Dragons football team roster
Players
Coaches
Offense

Pos.	#	Name	Class
TE	7	Forbes
OT	9	Johnson
G	5	Heckman
C	4	Barr
RG	6	Becker
OT	14	Dill
TE	8	Perry
QB	2	Schwarz
HB	19	Butler
HB	3	Smith
FB	1	Sukin
OT	10	Major
TE	11	Neely
TE	12	Clarke
FB	15	Belding
HB	16	Narvil
QB	17	Quandt
FB	18	Warren
OT	19	Trainor
C	20	Wallace
G	21	Stamm
OT	22	Oberholtzer
TE	23	Raymond
TE	24	Stamp
G	25	Snyder
G	26	Kleindenst
TE	27	Davis
FB		Ed Clark

Defense

Pos.	#	Name	Class

Special teams

Pos.	#	Name	Class

Head coach

- Ollie W. Reed (Kansas State)

Coordinators/assistant coaches

- Kelly
- Davis

Legend

- (C) Team captain
- (S) Suspended
- (I) Ineligible
- Injured
- Redshirt

Roster
Last update: December 21, 2017
