= Thurston Towle =

American football player (1905–1960)

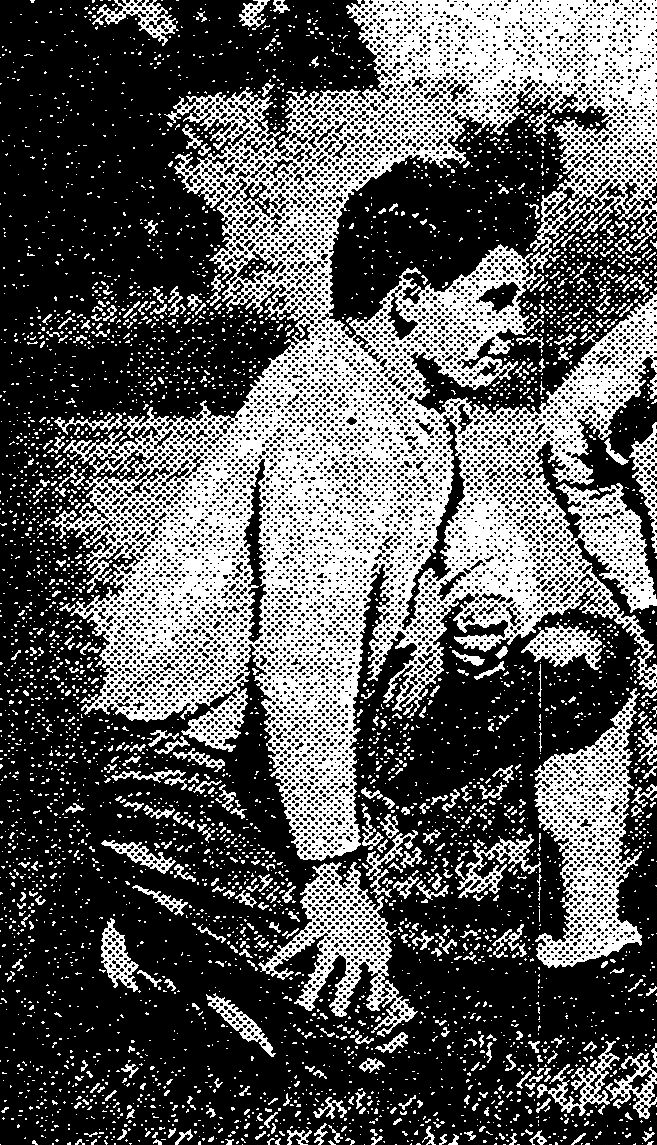
- Towle as Brown's ends coach in 1929

Profile
- Position: End

Personal information
- Born: January 1, 1905; Pawtucket, Rhode Island, U.S.
- Died: October 19, 1960 (aged 55); Providence, Rhode Island, U.S.
- Listed height: 5 ft 10 in (1.78 m)
- Listed weight: 160 lb (73 kg)

Career information
- College: Brown University

Career history
- Boston Bulldogs (1929)
- Stats at Pro Football Reference

Edward Thurston Towle (January 1, 1905 – October 19, 1960) was an American football player.

Towle was born in Pawtucket, Rhode Island, in 1905 and attended the Moses Brown School in Providence. He then attended Brown University. He played for the 1926 Brown Bears football team that compiled a 9–0–1 and became known as the "Iron Men" due to playing without substitution in key games. Towle played all but two minutes against Yale, Dartmouth, and Harvard.

He was hired as Brown's ends coach in the fall of 1928. He continued in that post at least through the 1935 season.

He also played one game in the National Football League (NFL) with the Boston Bulldogs during the 1929 season.

Towle was later inducted into the Brown Athletics Hall of Fame.

Towle died in 1960 at age 46.
