= 1926 Lafayette Leopards football team =

American college football season

1926 Lafayette Leopards football

National champion (Davis)
- Conference: Independent
- Record: 9–0
- Head coach: Herb McCracken (3rd season)
- Captain: Frank Kirkleski
- Home stadium: Fisher Field

1926 Eastern college football independents records
	Conf.			Overall
Team	W	L	T	W		L		T
No. 5 Lafayette		–		9	–	0	–	0
No. 10 Brown		–		9	–	0	–	1
NYU		–		8	–	1	–	0
No. 9 Army		–		7	–	1	–	1
Washington & Jefferson		–		7	–	1	–	1
Boston College		–		6	–	0	–	2
No. 10 Penn		–		7	–	1	–	1
Cornell		–		6	–	1	–	1
Princeton		–		5	–	1	–	1
Carnegie Tech		–		7	–	2	–	0
Springfield		–		6	–	2	–	0
Syracuse		–		7	–	2	–	1
Villanova		–		6	–	2	–	1
Colgate		–		5	–	2	–	2
Columbia		–		6	–	3	–	0
Pittsburgh		–		5	–	2	–	2
CCNY		–		5	–	3	–	0
Temple		–		5	–	3	–	0
Penn State		–		5	–	4	–	0
Tufts		–		4	–	4	–	0
Yale		–		4	–	4	–	0
Bucknell		–		4	–	5	–	1
Fordham		–		3	–	4	–	1
Harvard		–		3	–	5	–	0
Rutgers		–		3	–	6	–	0
Vermont		–		3	–	6	–	0
Drexel		–		2	–	5	–	0
Boston University		–		2	–	6	–	0
Lehigh		–		1	–	8	–	0
Franklin & Marshall		–		0	–	8	–	1
Rankings from Dickinson System

The 1926 Lafayette Leopards football team was an American football team that represented Lafayette College as an independent during the 1926 college football season. In its third season under head coach Herb McCracken, Lafayette compiled a 9–0 record and shut out five of nine opponents. Halfback Frank Kirkleski was the team captain.

Although Alabama and Stanford have been named the 1926 national champion by most selectors, the 1926 Lafayette team was named as the national champion by one selector, Parke H. Davis. The team was ranked No. 5 in the nation in the Dickinson System ratings released in December 1926.

The team played its home games at the Fisher Stadium in Easton, Pennsylvania. Fisher Stadium opened in 1926 with a seating capacity of 13,132.

== Schedule ==
Date	Opponent	Site	Result	Attendance	Source
September 25	Muhlenberg	Fisher Stadium; Easton, PA	W 35–0		
October 2	Schuylkill	Fisher Stadium; Easton, PA	W 47–0		
October 9	at Pittsburgh	Pitt Stadium; Pittsburgh, PA	W 17–7		
October 16	Dickinson	Fisher Stadium; Easton, PA	W 42–13		
October 23	Albright	Fisher Stadium; Easton, PA	W 30–7		
October 30	vs. Washington & Jefferson	Franklin Field; Philadelphia, PA	W 16–10	20,000	
November 6	at Rutgers	Neilson Field; New Brunswick, NJ	W 37–0		
November 13	Susquehanna	Fisher Stadium; Easton, PA	W 68–0		
November 20	Lehigh	Fisher Stadium; Easton, PA	W 35–0		
