= 1926 Washington & Jefferson Presidents football team =

American college football season

1926 Washington & Jefferson Presidents football
- Conference: Independent
- Record: 7–1–1
- Head coach: Andrew Kerr (1st season)

1926 Eastern college football independents records
	Conf.			Overall
Team	W	L	T	W		L		T
No. 5 Lafayette		–		9	–	0	–	0
No. 10 Brown		–		9	–	0	–	1
NYU		–		8	–	1	–	0
No. 9 Army		–		7	–	1	–	1
Washington & Jefferson		–		7	–	1	–	1
Boston College		–		6	–	0	–	2
No. 10 Penn		–		7	–	1	–	1
Cornell		–		6	–	1	–	1
Princeton		–		5	–	1	–	1
Carnegie Tech		–		7	–	2	–	0
Springfield		–		6	–	2	–	0
Syracuse		–		7	–	2	–	1
Villanova		–		6	–	2	–	1
Colgate		–		5	–	2	–	2
Columbia		–		6	–	3	–	0
Pittsburgh		–		5	–	2	–	2
CCNY		–		5	–	3	–	0
Temple		–		5	–	3	–	0
Penn State		–		5	–	4	–	0
Tufts		–		4	–	4	–	0
Yale		–		4	–	4	–	0
Bucknell		–		4	–	5	–	1
Fordham		–		3	–	4	–	1
Harvard		–		3	–	5	–	0
Rutgers		–		3	–	6	–	0
Vermont		–		3	–	6	–	0
Drexel		–		2	–	5	–	0
Boston University		–		2	–	6	–	0
Lehigh		–		1	–	8	–	0
Franklin & Marshall		–		0	–	8	–	1
Rankings from Dickinson System

The 1926 Washington & Jefferson Presidents football team was an American football team that represented Washington & Jefferson College as an independent during the 1926 college football season. In their first season under head coach Andrew Kerr, the Presidents compiled a 7–1–1 record and outscored opponents by a total of 143 to 46. Their sole loss was by a 16-10 score against 1926 national champion Lafayette -- the narrowest margin of any team against Lafayette in its national championship season. In the penultimate game of the season, the Presidents played Pittsburgh to a scoreless tie before a crowd of 50,000 at Pitt Stadium.

Fullback Bill Amos was selected as a second-team All-American by the All-America Board, International News Service (INS), Billy Evans, and Walter Eckersall. He was also selected by the Associated Press (AP) as a first-team player on the 1926 All-Eastern football team.

== Schedule ==
Date	Opponent	Site	Result	Attendance	Source
September 25	Waynesburg	Washington, PA	W 13–0		
October 2	Bucknell	Washington, PA	W 17–2		
October 9	Rutgers	College Field; Washington, PA	W 19–6	6,000	
October 16	at Carnegie Tech	Pittsburgh, PA	W 17–6		
October 23	at Fordham	Polo Grounds; New York, NY	W 28–13	8,000	
October 30	vs. Lafayette	Franklin Field; Philadelphia, PA	L 10–16	20,000	
November 6	Bethany (WV)	Washington, PA	W 26–0		
November 13	at Pittsburgh	Pitt Stadium; Pittsburgh, PA	T 0–0	50,000	
November 25	at West Virginia	Mountaineer Field; Morgantown, WV	W 13–3		
