= Tad Jones (American football) =

American football player and coach (1887–1957)

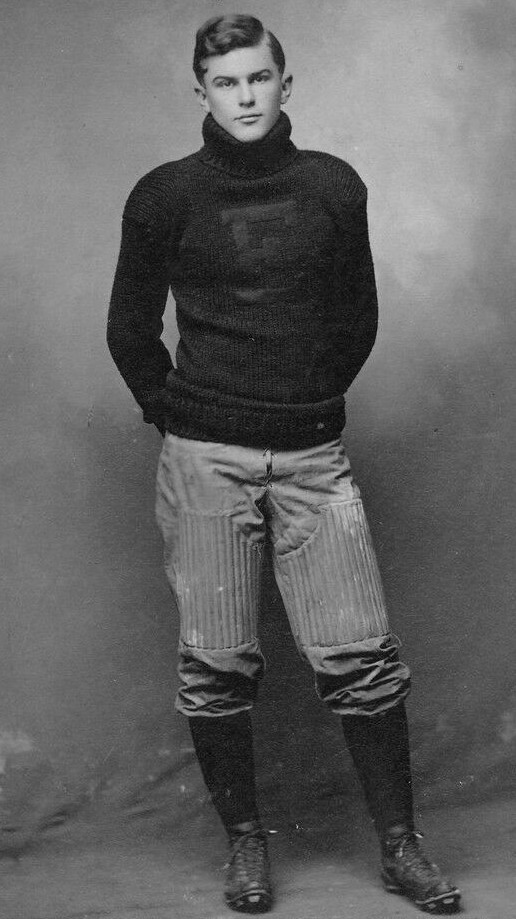
- Jones while at Phillips Exeter Academy

Biographical details
- Born: February 22, 1887; Excello, Ohio, U.S.
- Died: June 19, 1957 (aged 70); Hamden, Connecticut, U.S.

Playing career
- 1905–1907: Yale
- Position: Quarterback

Coaching career (HC unless noted)
- 1908: Yale (assistant)
- 1909–1910: Syracuse
- 1916–1917: Yale
- 1920–1927: Yale

Head coaching record
- Overall: 69–24–6 (college) (Note: Though official Yale records credit the 1917 season to Jones, Thomas G. Bergin explains in his book, The Game: The Harvard-Yale Football Rivalry, 1875-1983, that the 1917 season was informal, with the team led by Arthur Brides and trainer Johnny Mack. The 1917 team had a 3–0 record.)

Accomplishments and honors

Championships
- As coach: National (1927); As player: National (1907)

Awards
- Consensus All-American (1907); Second-team All-American (1906)
- College Football Hall of Fame; Inducted in 1958 (profile)

Thomas Albert Dwight "Tad" Jones (February 22, 1887 – June 19, 1957) was an American college football player and coach. He served as the head football coach at Syracuse University (1909–1910) and Yale University (1916–1917, 1920–1927), compiling a career head coaching record of 69–24–6. He was inducted into the College Football Hall of Fame as a coach in 1958.

Jones quarterbacked Yale to 6–0 and 12–0 victories versus Harvard as a junior and senior, respectively, in 1906 and 1907. Yale finished with 9–0–1 records both years, and he was named an All-American both seasons. As head coach, Jones led Yale football to a 5–3–1 record versus Harvard, and gave the most revered pregame pep talk in Yale athletic history before the Harvard–Yale game in 1923. Before that contest Jones intoned famously, "Gentlemen, you are about to play football against Harvard. Never again may you do something so important." Yale won 13–0, with Babe Ruth providing broadcast commentary. Ducky Pond returned a Harvard fumble sixty-three yards for a touchdown. Bill Mallory kicked the extra point and two field goals. The Yale team was 8-0 for the season.

== Family and honors ==
Jones's older brother was Howard Jones, who also played at Yale from 1905 to 1907. The elder Jones also coached at Yale and Syracuse, as well as Ohio State University, the University of Iowa, Duke University, and the University of Southern California.

The "T.A.D. Jones" room at the gymnasium of Phillips Exeter Academy, where he taught, is named for Jones.

== Head coaching record ==
=== College ===
Year	Team	Overall	Conference	Standing	Bowl/playoffs
Syracuse Orangemen (Independent) (1909–1910)
1909	Syracuse	4–5–1			
1910	Syracuse	5–4–1			
Syracuse:		9–9–2			
Yale Bulldogs (Independent) (1916–1917)
1916	Yale	8–1			
1917	Yale	3–0			
Yale Bulldogs (Independent) (1920–1927)
1920	Yale	5–3			
1921	Yale	8–1			
1922	Yale	6–3–1			
1923	Yale	8–0			
1924	Yale	6–0–2			
1925	Yale	5–2–1			
1926	Yale	4–4			
1927	Yale	7–1			
Yale:		60–15–4			
Total:		69–24–6			
