= 1926 Pittsburgh Panthers football team =

American college football season

1926 Pittsburgh Panthers football
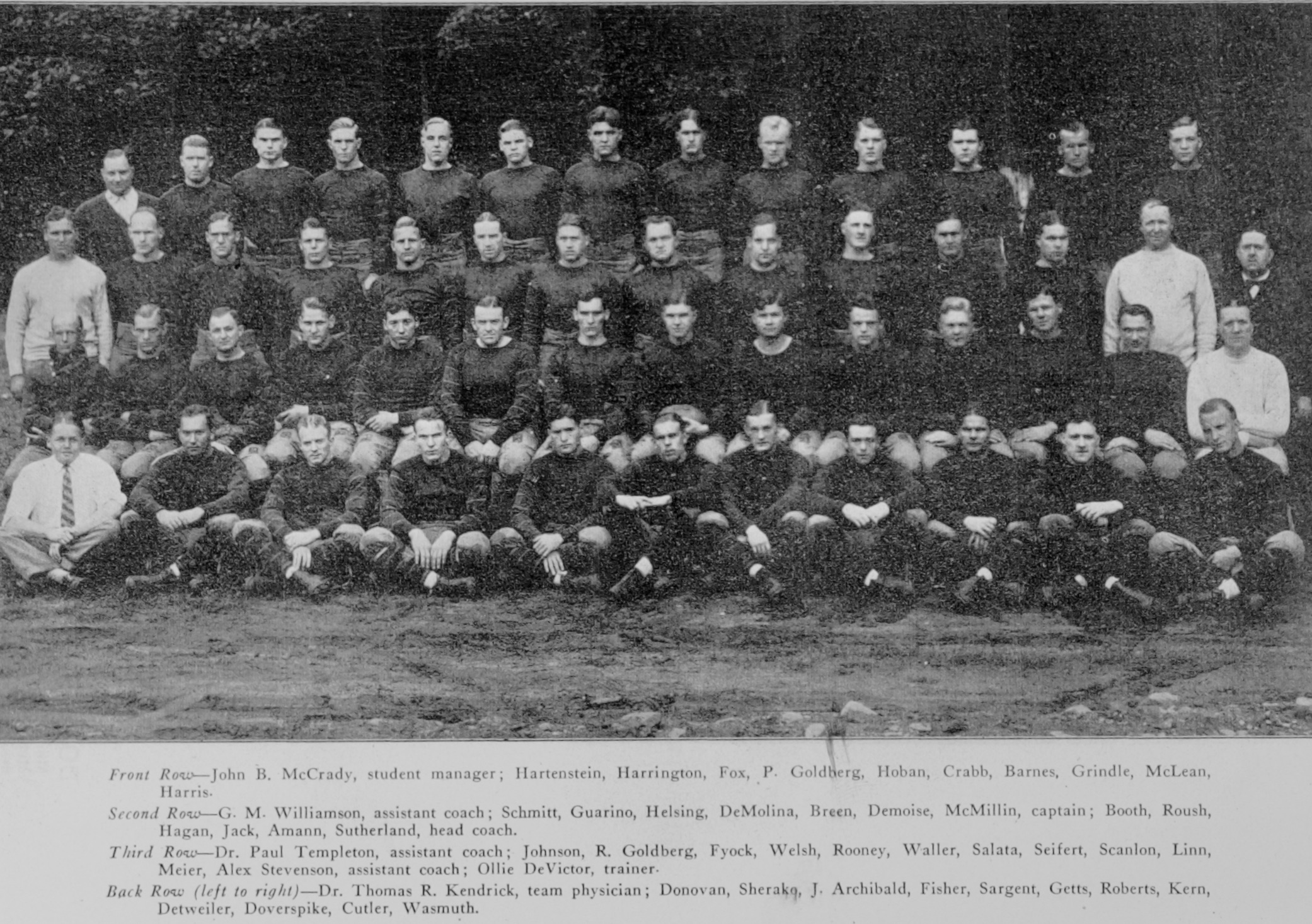
- Conference: Independent
- Record: 5–2–2
- Head coach: Jock Sutherland (3rd season)
- Offensive scheme: Single-wing
- Captain: Blair McMillan
- Home stadium: Pitt Stadium

1926 Eastern college football independents records
	Conf.			Overall
Team	W	L	T	W		L		T
No. 5 Lafayette		–		9	–	0	–	0
No. 10 Brown		–		9	–	0	–	1
NYU		–		8	–	1	–	0
No. 9 Army		–		7	–	1	–	1
Washington & Jefferson		–		7	–	1	–	1
Boston College		–		6	–	0	–	2
No. 10 Penn		–		7	–	1	–	1
Cornell		–		6	–	1	–	1
Princeton		–		5	–	1	–	1
Carnegie Tech		–		7	–	2	–	0
Springfield		–		6	–	2	–	0
Syracuse		–		7	–	2	–	1
Villanova		–		6	–	2	–	1
Colgate		–		5	–	2	–	2
Columbia		–		6	–	3	–	0
Pittsburgh		–		5	–	2	–	2
CCNY		–		5	–	3	–	0
Temple		–		5	–	3	–	0
Penn State		–		5	–	4	–	0
Tufts		–		4	–	4	–	0
Yale		–		4	–	4	–	0
Bucknell		–		4	–	5	–	1
Fordham		–		3	–	4	–	1
Harvard		–		3	–	5	–	0
Rutgers		–		3	–	6	–	0
Vermont		–		3	–	6	–	0
Drexel		–		2	–	5	–	0
Boston University		–		2	–	6	–	0
Lehigh		–		1	–	8	–	0
Franklin & Marshall		–		0	–	8	–	1
Rankings from Dickinson System

The 1926 Pittsburgh Panthers football team was an American football team that represented the University of Pittsburgh as an independent during the 1926 college football season. In its third season under head coach Jock Sutherland, the team compiled a 5–2–2 record and outscored all opponents by a total of 170 to 73. The team played all nine of its games at home at Pitt Stadium in Pittsburgh.

== Schedule ==
Date	Opponent	Site	Result	Attendance	Source
September 25	Allegheny	Pitt Stadium; Pittsburgh, PA	W 9–7	12,000	
October 2	Georgetown	Pitt Stadium; Pittsburgh, PA	T 6–6	20,000	
October 9	Lafayette	Pitt Stadium; Pittsburgh, PA	L 7–17	30,000	
October 16	Colgate	Pitt Stadium; Pittsburgh, PA	W 19–16	20,000	
October 23	Carnegie Tech	Pitt Stadium; Pittsburgh, PA	L 0–14	40,000	
October 30	Westminster (PA)	Pitt Stadium; Pittsburgh, PA	W 88–0	10,000	
November 6	West Virginia	Pitt Stadium; Pittsburgh, PA (rivalry)	W 17–7	30,000	
November 13	Washington & Jefferson	Pitt Stadium; Pittsburgh, PA	T 0–0	45,000	
November 25	Penn State	Pitt Stadium; Pittsburgh, PA (rivalry)	W 24–6	42,915–50,000	

== Preseason ==
With the 8–1 record recorded by his 1925 eleven, the Jock Sutherland system of football was validated to the Pitt faithful. Unfortunately, graduation depleted his strong team. John Harding, Jesse Brown, Andy Gustafson, Ralph Chase, Zoner Wissinger and John Kifer were all gone from the starting lineup along with top reserves Ulhard Hangartner, Frank Benedict, Robert Irwin and Carl McCutcheon.

The lettermen selected end Blair McMillin as captain for the 1926 season.

On January 12, John B. McGrady, a junior in the School of Industrial Engineering, was appointed varsity football manager for the 1926 season by Karl E. Davis, graduate manager of athletics.

Fifty young men attended coach Sutherland's second spring football practice from April 7 – May 1. Prior to camp, Coach Sutherland canvassed the university to recruit young men with football experience who never tried out for the Pitt team. The Pitt Weekly reported: "The spring work has always been heralded as an opportunity to review the fundamentals of the game and to find new men. Players who never before applied for football here attended the sessions and several have excellent chances of earning places on the team." The session closed Saturday, May 1 with a full length practice game.

On August 31 the fourteenth edition of Camp Hamilton commenced for close to 50 hopeful lads vying for positions on the 1926 Pitt squad. Coach Sutherland and his staff had three weeks to craft his men into a cohesive unit to take on the nine game home schedule that awaited. The schedule is harder, "beyond a doubt, than that of any eleven in the East, South or West. There is the question whether or not the bevy of inexperienced, unseasoned men who have been called on to fill the gaps cut in the ranks by graduation will measure up."

Student Manager John McCrady encapsulated his myriad of memories acquired at Camp Hamilton for the 1928 Owl Yearbook:

"At the mention of Camp Hamilton to any of those who have done time there brings first a glamorless memory of monotonous plugging, of sprains and bruises and fatigue; but then comes a memory of the chill of the cool evenings, the dripping dampness of white tents, the rushing murmur of Paint Creek, the discordant jangling of the first bell. At Camp Hamilton acquaintances are formed and friendships sealed. There is an irrepressible spirit born of perseverance and self-sacrifice which draws and binds the men together. Inconveniences are undergone willingly, injuries borne patiently, strict training rules adhered to without protest. Any manager, ex-manager, or assistant manager, will tell you that the contact with this group, and the friendships and acquaintances made mean more to him than the attaining of the managership. Any player will tell you that it is these few weeks at Camp Hamilton that inculcate a fighting spirit into the members of the squad, which gives zest to the whole season. In my three pilgrimages to Windber Wilderness I have never seen a more wonderful spirit among managers, players and coaches, than was shown last fall.

With the team back in school, practice was held in the stadium so the 75 freshmen team aspirants could use the practice field. At the stadium, the day before the first game against Allegheny College, Coach Sutherland allowed the student body to watch practice for the first time.

== Coaching staff ==
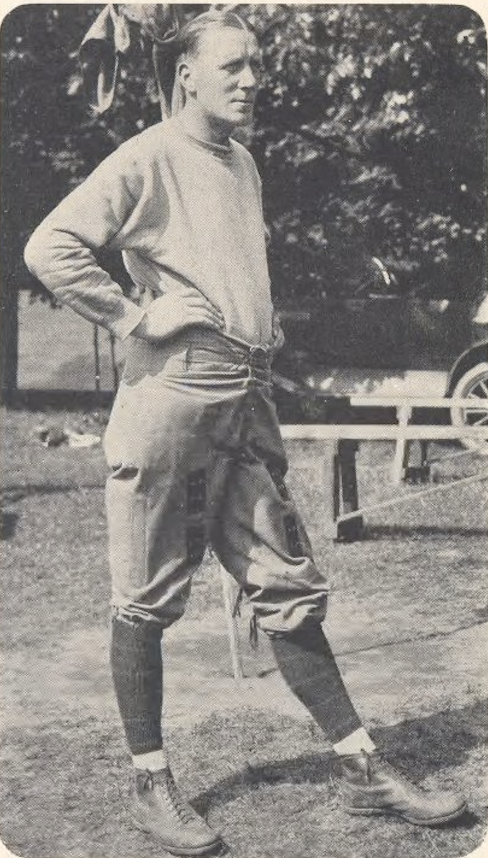
Coach "Jock" Sutherland

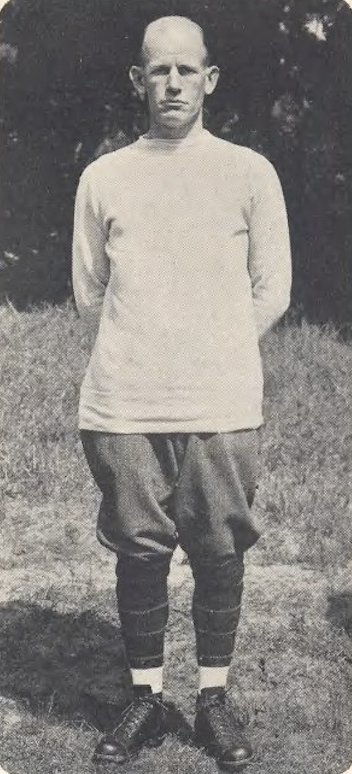
Coach Williamson

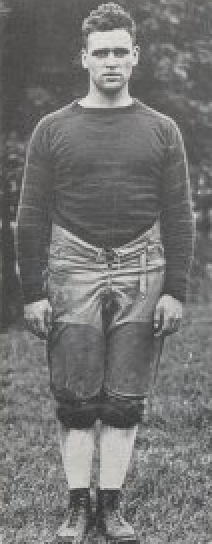
Paul Templeton

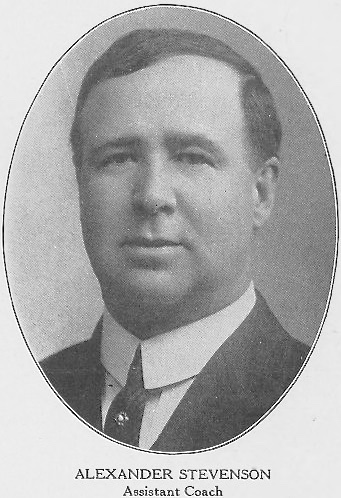
Alexander Stevenson

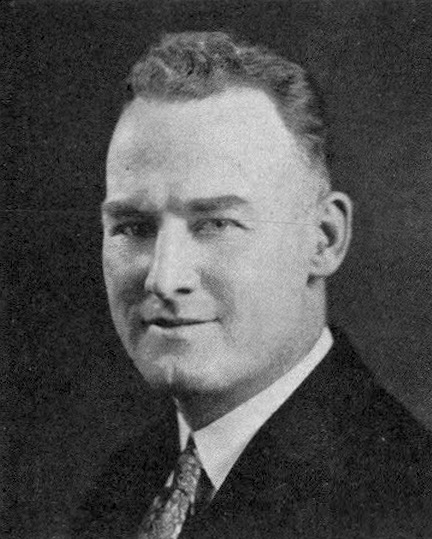
H. Clifford Carlson

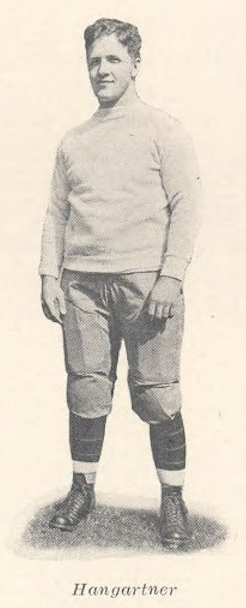
Ulhardt Hangartner

1926 Pittsburgh Panthers football staff
Coaching staff: John B. "Jock" Sutherland – Head coach; Guy "Chalky" Williamson – Assistant coach; Paul Templeton – Assistant coach; Alexander Stevenson – Assistant coach; H. Clifford Carlson – Freshman coach; Ulhardt Hangartner – assistant freshman coach	Support staff: John B. McCrady– student football manager; Thomas R. Kendrick – team physician; Ollie DeVictor – team trainer; Karl E. Davis – graduate manager of athletics; George I. Carson – assistant graduate manager

== Roster ==
1926 Pittsburgh Panthers football roster
Player	Position	Games	Height	Weight	Age	Class	School	Prep School	Hometown
Blair V. McMillin*	end	8	5' 11"	165	20	1927	College	Wilkinsburg H. S.	Wilkinsburg, Pa.
Alfred Amann	quarterback	3	5' 9"	171	22	1927	Business Adm.	Bellefonte Academy	Jeannette, Pa.
Joseph A. Archibald	guard	4	6' 1"	166	22	1927	Dental	Bellefonte Academy	Pittsburgh, Pa.
Markley Barnes*	center	6	5' 8"	172	23	1929	Business Adm.	Broaddus Academy	Wellsburg, W. Va.
Allan A. Booth*	fullback	9	5' 8"	187	22	1928	Dental	Sharon H. S.	Sharon, Pa.
John P. Breen	center	2	5' 10"	155	21	1928	Business Adm.	New Brighton H. S.	Pittsburgh, Pa.
Charles Crabb	halfback	4	5' 9"	149	22	1930	Dental	Charleoi H. S.	Charleroi, Pa.
Andrew A. Cutler*	center	8	6'	190	21	1928	Dental	Bellefonte Academy	Fredericktown, Pa.
John C. Davis	fullback	1	6' 1"	190	22	1929	Dental	Juniata College	Huntington, W. Va.
Felix F. Demoise*	end	7	5' 9"	157	23	1928	Dental	Greensburg H. S.	Greensburg, Pa.
Charles Detweiler	tackle	0	6' 1"	185	20	1929	College	Crafton H. S.	Crafton, Pa.
Albert DeMeolo*	guard	8	5' 11"	176	20	1930	Dental	Bellefonte Academy	Coraopolis, Pa.
Francis Donovan	guard	1	5' 10"	187	22	1928	Dental	St. Francis College	Renovo, Pa.
Chester D. Doverspike	tackle	0	6'	184	20	1928	Business Adm.	New Bethlehem H. S.	New Bethlehem, Pa.
Paul R. Fisher*	guard	6	6'	184	20	1928	English	Avalon H. S.	Avalon, Pa.
Alexander Fox	tackle	1	5' 11"	172	20	1929	Business Adm.	New Castle H. S.	New Castle, Pa.
Dwight W. Fyock*	fullback	4	5' 10"	161	22	1928	Business Adm.	Johnstown H. S.	Johnstown, Pa.
Mike Getto	tackle	5	6' 2"	197	20	1929	Business Adm.	Jeannette H. S.	Jeannette, Pa.
Philip Goldberg	end	1	5' 10"	154	18	1929	College	New Kensington H. S.	New Kensington, Pa.
Richard Goldberg	center	4	6'	184	21	1928	Dental	Slippery Rock Normal	New Kensington, Pa.
John E. Grindle	halfback	2	5' 7"	161	23	1928	Coillege	Potomac State	Lonaconing, Md.
Albert Guarino*	end	8	5' 8"	168	22	1929	College	Bellefonte Academy	Greensburg, Pa.
James Hagan*	halfback	8	5' 9"	170	21	1928	Business Adm.	Windber H. S.	Windber, Pa.
Harold Hartenstein	halfback	0	5' 9"	159	20	1928	Dental	Suffield School	New Haven, Ct.
Theodore Helsing	end	0	6'	168	20	1929	English	Wilkinsburg H. S.	Wilkinsburg, Pa.
Lee R. Herrington	halfback	0	5' 8"	155	21	1927	Pre-Medical	Uniontown H. S.	Uniontown, Pa.
Walter Hoban	halfback	1	5' 8"	155	22	1928	Dental	Sharpsville H. S.	Sharpsville, Pa.
Clyde A. Jack*	end	4	5' 11"	171	22	1927	Dental	The Kiski School	Ridgway, Pa.
William Kern*	tackle	9	6' 1"	180	21	1928	Business Adm.	Wyoming Seminary	Kingston, Pa.
Howard Linn*	guard	8	5' 11"	194	23	1927	English	Bellefonte Academy	Carnegie, Pa.
Charles McLean	guard	0	5' 11"	161	20	1929	Pre-Medical	The Kiski School	Homestead, Pa.
Theodore Meier	tackle	0	5' 11"	192	20	1929	Business Adm.	East Erie H. S.	Erie, Pa.
John A. Roberts*	end	8	6' 2"	180	20	1928	College	Parkersburg H. S.	Parkersburg, W. Va.
James Rooney*	quarterback	9	5' 11"	170	20	1930	Dental	Bellefonte Academy	Pittsburgh, Pa.
Edgar Roush	tackle	0	5' 11"	164	20	1929	Business Adm.	Holy Rosary H. S.	Pittsburgh, Pa.
Andrew J. Salata*	tackle	9	5' 10"	192	22	1928	Dental	Wyoming Seminary	Youngstown, Pa.
Philip Sargeant	end	1	6'	172	20	1928	Dental	New Castle H. S.	New Castle, Pa.
James A. Scanlon	end	3	6'	173	22	1928	Dental	The Kiski School	Pittsburgh, Pa.
Joseph Schmitt*	halfback	8	5' 11"	154	22	1927	Dental	The Kiski School	Donora, Pa.
Edward Seifert	guard	0	5' 11"	200	20	1928	Business Adm.	Schenley H. S.	Pittsburgh, Pa.
Edward Sherako	end	0	6' 1"	167	21	1929	Business Adm.	Wyoming Seminary	Plymouth, Pa.
Milford Waller	guard	0	5' 11"	200	20	1930	Dental	South Hills H. S.	Pittsburgh, Pa.
Chester H. Wasmuth*	tackle	6	5' 11"	190	21	1928	Dental	Union H. S.	Turtle Creek, Pa.
Gilbert L. Welch*	halfback	8	5' 11"	165	22	1928	Business Adm.	Bellefonte Academy	Parkersburg, W. Va.
John B. McCrady*	manager					1927	Business Adm.	Edgewood H. S.	Edgewood, Pa.
* Letterman

== Game summaries ==
=== Allegheny ===
Game 1: Allegheny at Pitt

Team	1	2	3	4	Total
Allegheny	0	0	7	0	7
• Pitt	7	0	0	2	9

- Date: September 25, 1926
- Location: Pitt Stadium
  Pittsburgh, PA
- Game attendance: 9,000
- Game weather: rain
- Referee: John P. Egan (Duquesne)

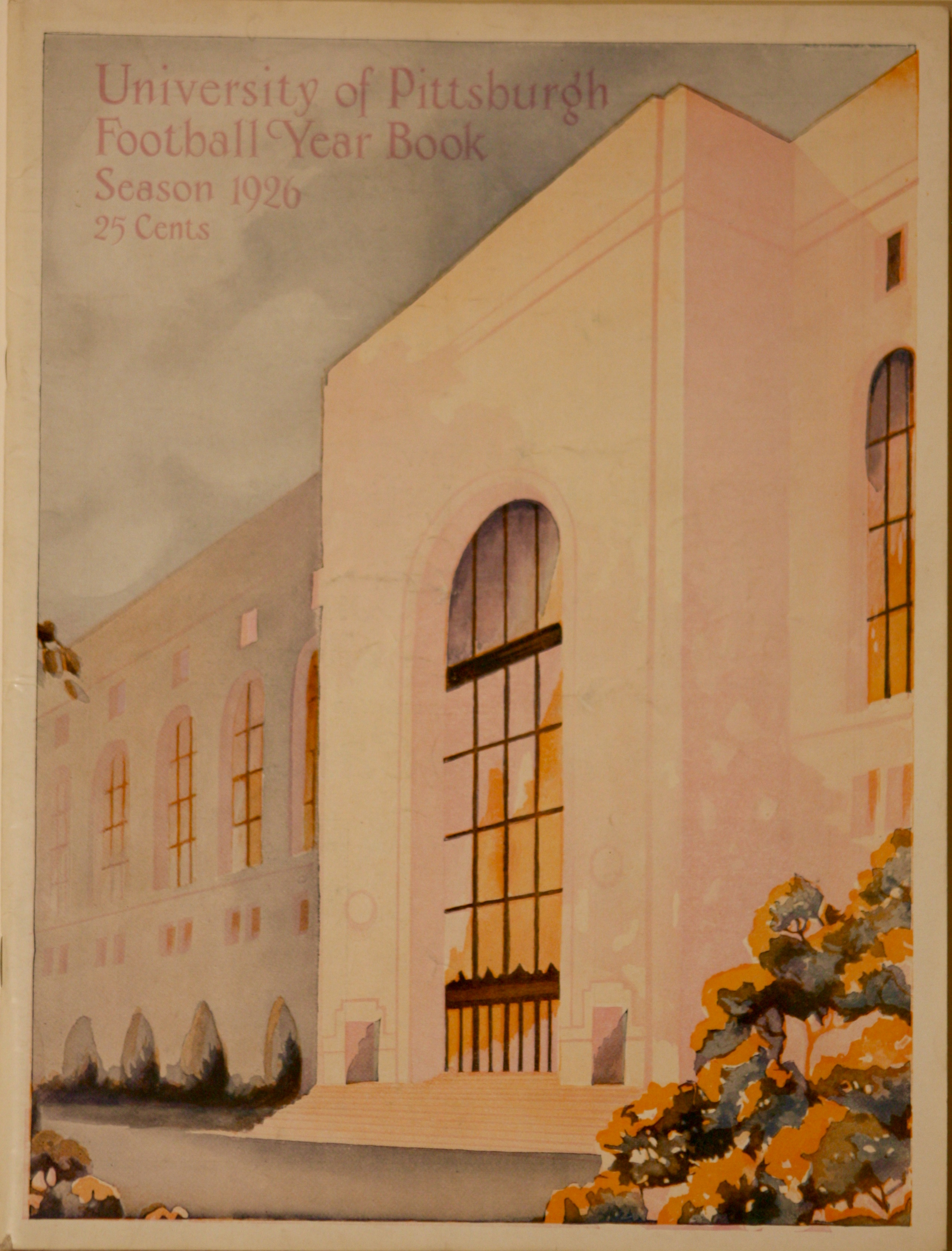
Program for September 25, 1926 Pitt vs. Allegheny game

Allegheny College in Meadville, PA was the opening game opponent for the Panthers. Pitt led the all-time series with Allegheny by a 4–2 margin. Pitt out scored the Methodists in the last three games played by 46, 35 and 74 points, but the two had not met on the gridiron since 1916. First year Allegheny coach Melvin P. Merritt installed the Dartmouth-Hawley system to counter the Sutherland-Warner system. "Coach Merritt played at Dartmouth during the regime of Dr. C. W. Spears and was assistant later under Jack Cannell and Jess Hawley. If the Methodists have perfected forward passing in a manner in any way comparable to the Green's air attack of last fall, they may be counted on to keep the Panthers' secondary defense on the alert."

Pitt halfback, Gilbert "Gibby" Welch suffered an injury at Camp Hamilton and was not in the starting lineup. Otherwise, the Panthers were healthy and Coach Sutherland planned to make numerous substitutions during the game.

"Allegheny College's game and doughty little eleven exceeded the fondest hopes of its most ardent supporters yesterday. By holding the Pitt Panthers to a 9 to 7 score in the opening game of the season at the Pitt stadium, the Meadville Methodists carried home with them virtually a victory." "The Panther margin of victory was only a safety, which came after a succession of fumbles and finally ended up with (Andy) Cutler tackling Davis of Allegheny behind his own goal line for the points necessary to triumph."

Pitt's first possession started on their own 20-yard line. James Hagan and Joseph Schmitt alternated carrying the ball off-tackle and around the ends. From the Allegheny 2-yard line "Hagan ran wide around right end for the touchdown." Allan Booth converted the placement and Pitt led 7 to 0. Allegheny countered at the start of the third period. The Methodists gained possession on the Pitt 40-yard line. Four straight pass plays resulted in a first down on the Pitt 25-yard line. Another pass from Waleski to Davis was good for the touchdown. Waleski kicked the extra point and the score remained tied until Davis's critical fumble late in the fourth quarter. Allegheny finished the season with a 4–5 record.

The Pitt lineup for the game against Allegheny was Blair McMillin (left end), Andrew Salata (left tackle), Howard Linn (left guard), Andrew Cutler (center), John Roberts (right guard), William Kern (right tackle), Felix Demoise (left end), James Rooney (quarterback), James Hagan (left halfback), Joseph Schmitt (right halfback) and Allan Booth (fullback). Substitutes appearing in the game for Pitt were Alfred Amann, Joseph Archibald, Markley Barnes, Allan Booth, John Breen, Charles Crabb, Albert DiMeolo, Paul Fisher, Mike Getto, John Grindle, Albert Guarino and Clyde Jack.

=== Georgetown ===
Game 2: Georgetown at Pitt

Team	1	2	3	4	Total
Georgetown	0	0	6	0	6
Pitt	6	0	0	0	6

- Date: October 2, 1926
- Location: Pitt Stadium
  Pittsburgh, PA
- Game attendance: 18,000
- Game weather: hot sun
- Referee: Ed Thorpe (De LaSalle)

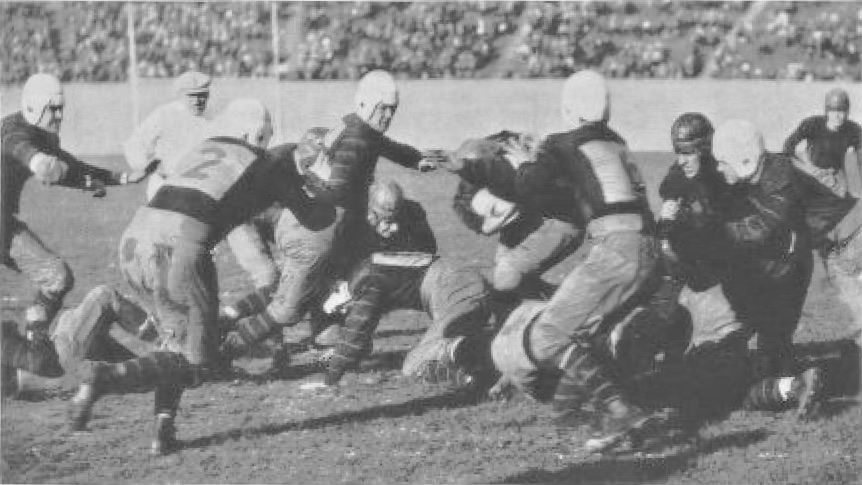
Photo from 1926 Pitt football game

Future Hall of Fame coach Lou Little brought his Georgetown eleven to Pitt Stadium for the second game of the 1926 season. The teams last met in 1914. Pitt was ahead in the all-time series 2–0, outscoring the Blue and Grey 38–0. Georgetown, under the direction of coach Little, finished the 1925 season with a 9–1 record. Coach Little upgraded the schedule by adding Pitt, West Virginia, Syracuse and Navy to the 1926 slate. The Blue and Gray beat Drexel 42–0 in their season opener. The Georgetown team averaged close to 190 pounds per man. Guard Harry Connaughton, a consensus All-American pick, anchored the line. "Coach Lou Little confided to friends in Washington that he plans to use his running attack against the Panthers. While he would not definitely predict a victory, it is known that he has all the confidence in the world in his charges."

Gilbert Welch was back in the lineup at halfback and Coach Sutherland hoped his pass defense was improved over the showing against Allegheny.

The Pittsburgh Press reported: "Georgetown, touted as one of the most powerful football teams in the entire east this season, and the Pitt Panthers, regaining in a measure some of their old-time color and power, staged one of the prettiest early season gridiron battles in years at Pitt stadium yesterday. There was glory enough for both teams as they battled on almost even terms throughout four hectic periods underneath a broiling sun, and the drawn struggle, the score was 6 to 6, tells the complete story."

In the first period James Rooney's punt was blocked and Georgetown recovered on the Pitt 14-yard line. A 9 yard pass play followed by two plunges into the line by Thompson put 6 points on the board for the visitors. Gormley missed the placement and Georgetown led 6–0. The remainder of the half was a punting duel. In the third quarter after Pitt advanced the ball to the Georgetown 18-yard line, Joseph Schmitt fumbled and Georgetown recovered. On first down Gormley fumbled the ball back to Pitt on the 5-yard line. "On five attempts, the extra being due to Georgetown's offside playing, (Allan) Booth made the tying touchdown." The extra point was blocked and the game was tied 6 to 6. Late in the game Georgetown made a first down on the Pitt 6-yard line. "On three tries the Capital players made 4 yards and elected to try for a touchdown via the aerial route on the last chance, but the ball was knocked down by Booth. There were no further scoring opportunities."

The Blue and Gray finished their season with a respectable 7–2–1 record. Pitt and Georgetown would not meet on the gridiron again.

The Pitt lineup for the game against Georgetown was Albert Guarino (left end), William Kern (left tackle), Howard Linn (left guard), Andrew Cutler (center), John Roberts (right guard), Andrew Salata (right tackle), Felix Demoise (right end), James Rooney (quarterback), Gilbert Welch (left halfback), Joseph Schmitt (right halfback) and Allan Booth (fullback). Substitutes appearing in the game for Pitt were James Hagan and Albert DiMeolo.

=== Lafayette ===
Week 3: Lafayette at Pitt

Team	1	2	3	4	Total
• Lafayette	0	7	0	10	17
Pitt	0	7	0	0	7

- Date: October 9, 1926
- Location: Pitt Stadium
  Pittsburgh, PA
- Game start: 2:30 p.m.
- Game attendance: 20,000
- Game weather: perfect
- Referee: Wilmer G. Crowell (Swarthmore)

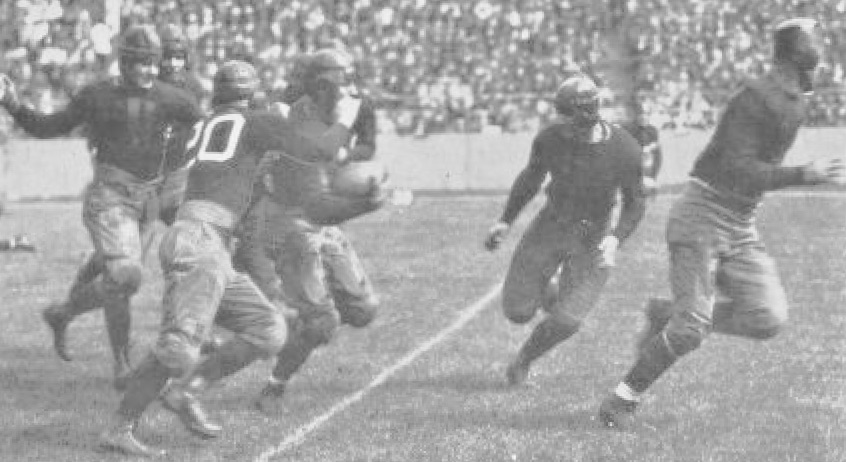
Photo from 1926 Pitt football game

Jock Sutherland built the Lafayette program into an eastern juggernaut prior to his arrival as Pitt coach. Now, third year coach Herb McCracken and his Lafayette Leopards are Jock Sutherland's number one nemesis. The Leopards have beaten the Panthers two years in a row and lead the all-time series 4–3. The Leopards arrived in Pittsburgh with a 2–0 record on the season, having beaten both Muhlenberg and Schuylkill College handily. Tackle Howard D. Cothran, Halfback Frank Kirkleski, and halfback George Wilson all received All-America mentions at the end of the season. "On Saturday the same lineup will start for the third time this season. Coach McCracken has announced that there will be no change. He is satisfied that the 11 men who have been playing together since the start of the season compose the best possible combination." The Pittsburgh Press noted: "Jock (Sutherland) regards tomorrow's game as his team's supreme early season test. He recognizes the eagerness of McCracken to score his third straight victory at the expense of his alma mater, and is impressing upon the wearers of the Blue and Gold the necessity of winning over the easterners."

Max E. Hannum summed it up best. "Herb McCracken returned to Pittsburgh again yesterday to work grief on his Alma Mater. The maroon-colored jinx that has clung to the Pitt Panther for several seasons refused to let go and for the third successive time the Blue and Gold trailed their Eastonian rivals. Yesterday's score was 17 to 7 and 20,000 spectators thronged into the stadium to witness a game that was staged under perfect weather conditions, a contest that was thrilling and solidly played from the very start until late in the final period."

Lafayette scored first. Late in the first quarter Pitt quarterback James Rooney punted to Frank Kirleski on the Lafayette 37-yard line and he returned it 37 yards to the Pitt 26-yard line. George Wilson lost two yards on first down and the period came to a close. A double pass followed by a forward pass advanced the ball to the Pitt 8-yard line. On third down a forward pass from halfback Wilson to quarterback Marsh produced a touchdown. Howard Cothran kicked the extra point and Lafayette led 7 to 0. Pitt received the kick-off and, utilizing their running attack, promptly marched down the field to the Lafayette 17-yard line. Rooney threw a 17 yard touchdown pass to Gibby Welch for the touchdown. Allan Booth tied the game with a successful placement. Pitt was on the Lafayette 36-yard line as the half ended. In the third stanza the Pitt offense advanced the ball to the Lafayette 30-yard line and Booth missed a 35 yard field goal attempt. On their next possession the Pitt offense ran and passed to the Leopard 15-yard line but proceeded to lose the ball on downs. The fourth quarter was all Lafayette. The Maroon advanced the ball from their 35-yard line to the Pitt 14-yard line. The Pitt defense stiffened and Cothran booted a 20 yard field goal to give Lafayette a 3 point lead 10 to 7. Pitt received the kick-off and started play on their 21-yard line. An incomplete pass was followed by a fumble and Lafayette had the ball on the Pitt 23-yard line. A penalty and two running plays advanced the ball to the Pitt 10-yard line. A pass play placed the ball on the 1-yard line and Maroon fullback Guest plunged into the end zone for the touchdown. Cothran added the placement and the final score read 17 to 7.

Lafayette finished the season with a 9–0 record and was named the national champion by Parke H. Davis. Pitt and Lafayette did not meet again on the gridiron.

The Pitt lineup for the game against Lafayette was Blair McMillin (left end), William Kern (left tackle), Howard Linn (left guard), Andrew Cutler (center), John Roberts (right guard), Andrew Salata (right tackle), James Rooney (quarterback), Gilbert Welch (left halfback), Joseph Schmitt (right halfback) and Allan Booth (fullback). James Hagan replaced Schmitt at right halfback.

=== Colgate ===
Week 4: Colgate at Pitt

Team	1	2	3	4	Total
Colgate	0	0	7	9	16
• Pitt	13	0	6	0	19

- Date: October 16, 1926
- Location: Pitt Stadium
  Pittsburgh, PA
- Game start: 2:30 p.m.
- Game attendance: 20,000
- Game weather: perfect
- Referee: J. P. Egan (Duquesne)

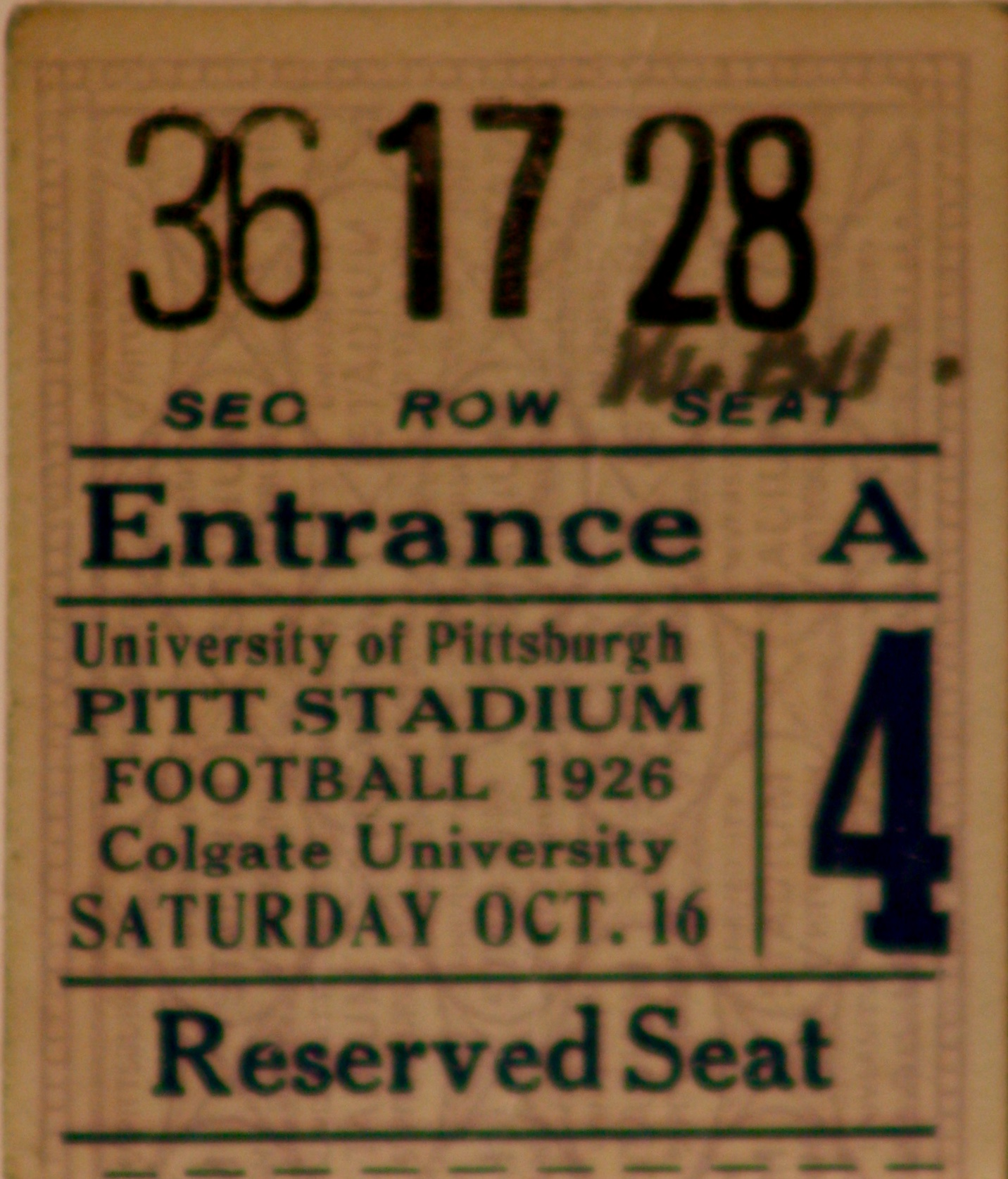
Ticket stub for October 16, 1926 Pitt vs. Colgate game

Colgate University led by first year coach George Hauser furnished the opposition for the fourth game. "Colgate is a newcomer on the Pitt schedule, but it is no means a newcomer in high collegiate sport circles." The 1925 team finished the season undefeated and rated top-five in the east. Their only blemishes were tie games with Lafayette and Brown. The 1926 edition rolled into Pittsburgh riding a three game unbeaten, unscored upon start to their season, having outscored their opposition 109–0. "The game looms as a tough proposition for the Panthers, and is expected to prove a fine exhibition of modern football. Colgate is a school that is thoroughly up to the minute in its athletics, and its football teams are always strong."

Coach Sutherland altered the lineup for the Colgate game. Chester Wasmuth replaced Andy Salata at right tackle; Paul Fisher replaced James Rooney at quarterback; James Hagan replaced Joseph Schmitt at right halfback and Albert Guarino replaced Felix Demoise at right end. The Pittsburgh Press noted that with the revamped lineup: "A victory over Colgate is expected to bolster the Panther morale, renew the confidence of Coach Sutherland's charges, and put them in just the proper frame of mind for the city championship tilt with Carnegie Tech a week hence."

The revised lineup worked as the Panthers gave Colgate its first defeat in two years by a score of 19 to 16 in front of 20,000 fans at the Stadium in beautiful fall weather. "The noisiest and most active spectators were the 5,000 school children who attended the game on the special admission charge."

"Both teams used an attack of passes and line plays and the Pitt line gave the home crowd a thrill by twice stopping the Colgate backs inside their three-yard line." The Panthers capitalized early in the first quarter as Colgate halfback Brewer fumbled on their first play from scrimmage and William Kern recovered for Pitt on the Colgate 22-yard line. Eight running plays culminated in a touchdown from the 6-inch line by Allan Booth. Booth added the point after and Pitt led 7–0. Late in the same quarter, Gilbert Welch returned a punt to the Colgate 38-yard line. On second down Welch threw a pass to Paul Fisher on the 25-yard line and with excellent interference he scampered into the end zone for Pitt's second touchdown. Booth missed the point after and Pitt led 13 to 0. Colgate got on the board late in the third period after Pitt had held them on the three-yard line on their previous possession. Pitt punted out to their 32-yard line. The Colgate offense was not denied on this drive and their fullback Shaughnessy finally bulled his way into the end zone on fourth down from the two. Shaughnessy added the placement and the score read 13–7. After an exchange of punts the Panthers gained possession on the Colgate 35-yard line. A double pass from Booth to Welch brought the crowd to their feet as he reversed his field and eluded all pursuers for Pitt's final score of the game. Booth missed the placement. Pitt led at the end of three quarters: 19 to 7. The Colgate offense pressured the Pitt defense and advanced the ball to the Pitt one yard line. Pitt held and took over on downs. James Rooney dropped back to punt out of danger and mistakenly backed out of the end zone for a safety. Pitt 19 to Colgate 9. As time was running out the Maroons added seven more points on a touchdown pass from Mehler to Brewer against the Panther second string. Shaughnessy added the point after. Final score 19 to 16. Colgate finished the season with a 5–2–2 record.

"The few hundred Colgate rooters who traveled with their team from Hamilton, N. Y., for the game Saturday set a good example for Pitt students to follow. After the game was over and most other spectators had left the field the visiting Colgate students stood up and sang their alma mater without the aid of a band. The act was specially commendable since Colgate's defeat Saturday was the first in two years. The New York state students proved that they have as strong school spirit in defeat as in a continued series of victories."

The Pitt lineup for the game against Colgate was Blair McMillin (left end), William Kern (left tackle), Howard Linn (left guard), Andrew Cutler (center), John Roberts (right guard), Chester Wasmuth (right tackle), Albert Guarino (right end), Paul Fisher (quarterback), Gilbert Welch (left halfback), James Hagan (right halfback) and Allan Booth (fullback). Substitutes appearing in the game for Pitt were James Rooney, James Scanlon, Albert DiMeolo, Andrew Salata, Richard Goldberg, Joseph Schmitt, Markley Barnes, Charles Crabb, Mike Getto, Clyde Jack, Joseph Archibald and Alfred Amann.

=== Carnegie Tech ===
Week 5: Carnegie Tech at Pitt

Team	1	2	3	4	Total
• Carnegie Tech	7	7	0	0	14
Pitt	0	0	0	0	0

- Date: October 23, 1926
- Location: Pitt Stadium
  Pittsburgh, PA
- Game start: 2:30 p.m.
- Game attendance: 50,000
- Game weather: Fair
- Referee: Wilmer D. Crowell (Swarthmore)

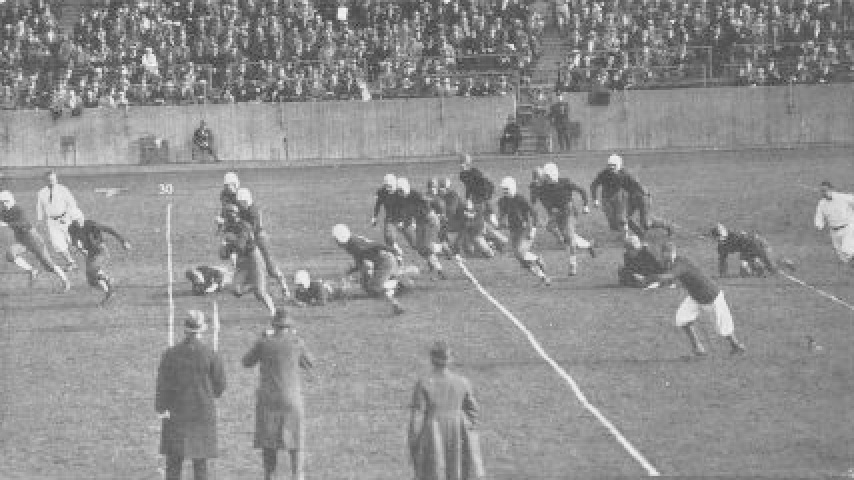
Photo from 1926 Pitt football game

The Panthers led the city series with Carnegie Tech 10–2, but the Tartans won 2 of the past three games under fifth-year coach Walter Steffen. Tech was 2–1 on the season having lost to Washington & Jefferson 17 to 6 the previous Saturday. All-America tackle and future member of the College Football Hall of Fame Lloyd Yoder anchored the line for the Tartans. "Johnny English, regular right end, will not play for Carnegie...Otherwise the usual lineup will represent the Skibos."

Pitt started the same lineup that bested Colgate. A diehard Pitt fan told The Pittsburgh Press: "The dope favors the Panther. She has generally risen above Carnegie. Look back over the Plaid records and you will find that, while Tech has had some great football teams, she has really won only three major games in her career – two from Pitt and one from Washington & Jefferson. That means something – and this year it means a Pitt triumph, just as it has meant 10 times in the past."

"Before the greatest crowd that ever witnessed a football game in western Pennsylvania, almost 50,000 supporters of the Plaid and the Panther jamming their way into Pitt stadium – Carnegie Tech yesterday regained the city collegiate championship by decisively earning a 14 to 0 triumph over Pitt." Coach Steffen's squad unleashed a passing attack early in the opening period. Their second possession started on their 39-yard line. On third down quarterback Howard Harpster "ran far back, wheeled and tossed a perfect pass to (Bill) Donohoe, which the latter took on the dead run on the Pitt 40. He dodged and squirmed while the interference formed to dispose of Welch, his last barrier, and then out-ran all his pursuers as the Tech side went stark raving mad. Cy Letzelter kicked the goal." Tech led 7 to 0 at the end of the first period. Donohue struck again in the second quarter. Pitt fumbled a double pass and Mefort recovered for Tech on the Pitt 18-yard line. "After several tries at the line and a short forward pass, Donohoe was given the ball on the last down and sprinted nine yards for touchdown on a deceptive end run." Letzelter added the placement and the final tally read Tech 14 to Pitt 0. The Pitt offense spent the second half in Tech territory but penalties, fumbles, interceptions and a staunch Tartan defense stymied their efforts to score.

The Pitt Weekly summed it up best: "Well, they walloped us on our own field and they did it up brown. There can be no doubt about it; It was the cleanest-cut victory by the cleanest-cut team at the stadium this season. Even if we wanted to we couldn't offer so much as an alibi. There is a certain satisfaction in that. To know that the Pitt stands cheered better than they ever had before; to know that the team did their utmost; to realize the good sportsmanship of the Pittites was of the best; to know all this is encouraging, even in the face of defeat."

The Tartans finished the season with a 7–2 record. In their last game of the season, this same Tech team astounded the football world by defeating Notre Dame 19 to 0.

The Pitt lineup for the game against Carnegie Tech was Blair McMillin (left end), William Kern (left tackle), Howard Linn (left guard), Andrew Cutler (center), John Roberts (right guard), Chester Wasmuth (right tackle), Albert Guarino (right end), Paul Fisher (quarterback), Gilbert Welch (left halfback), James Hagan (right halfback) and Allan Booth (fullback). Substitutes appearing in the game for Pitt were James Rooney, Albert DiMeolo, Felix Demoise, Joseph Schmitt, Richard Goldberg, Andrew Salata and Markley Barnes.

=== Westminster ===
Week 6: Westminster at Pitt

Team	1	2	3	4	Total
Westminster	0	0	0	0	0
• Pitt	20	28	34	6	88

- Date: October 30, 1926
- Location: Pitt Stadium
  Pittsburgh, PA
- Game start: 2:30 p.m.
- Game attendance: 10,000
- Game weather: rain
- Referee: Henry J. Blum (Iron City College)

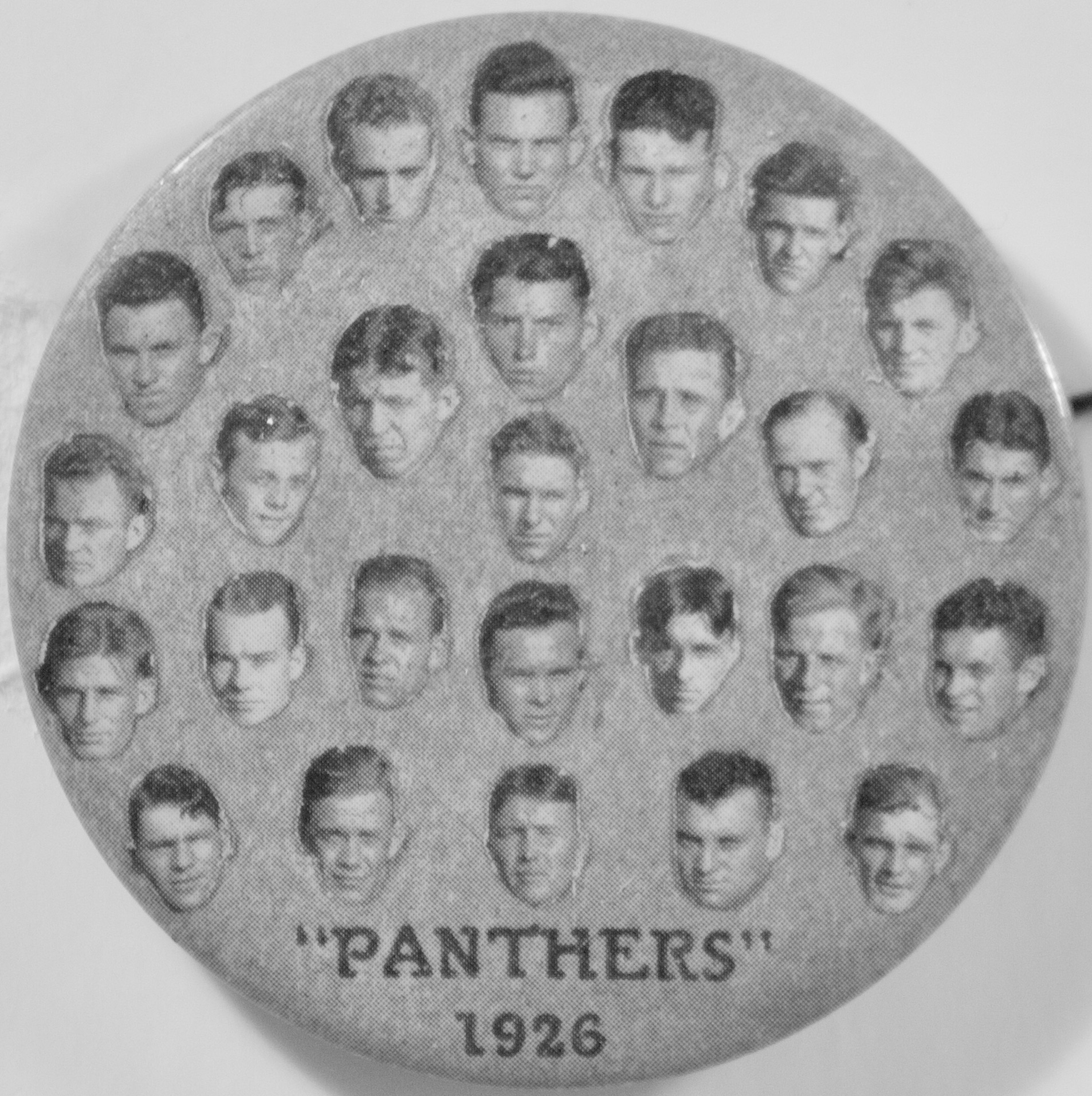
1926 souvenir team photo pin

The Westminster College Titans were scheduled as a "minor" game before the "hard" three game stretch to end the season. Pitt led the series with Westminster 13–0–2. The teams last met in 1917 and Pitt was the victor 25 to 0. The Titans were 1–2–1 on the season for first year coach Dwight Beede, a former Carnegie Tech fullback, who played on the 1923 and 1924 Tech teams that defeated the Panthers. "With loyalty to his alma mater to spur him on...the fans are likely to see a team schooled in the Steffen system."

The day before the game, Regis M. Welsh wrote a scathing column in The Pittsburgh Post criticizing all of Pitt football - "Swinging into the final weeks of a most disastrous year to champions and favorites, Pitt is the target of dissatisfied thousands, whose fault-finding ranges from the coaching system to the price of tickets at the game." The coach, his system, dissension on the team, uneasiness in the Athletic Council and the price of tickets were all touched upon by Mr. Welsh and his parting words were: "Pitt right now has reached a critical stage. Whether cool heads can avert the blowoff is problematical. But you can stick a pin in it that something spectacular is going to happen during the waning days with a big blowoff likely almost simultaneously after the final whistle Thanksgiving day."

On game day the Pittsburgh Gazette Times wrote a followup: "To insinuate that a college football player is not loyal to his alma mater when the gridiron season is at its height is the same in the matter of the seriousness of the charge, as to hint a soldier is a traitor to his country in time of war." The Panther squad met after practice Friday evening and drafted the following resolution:

"First – To brand the statement in regard to the dissension among the individual members of the University of Pittsburgh football squad or between members of said squad and Coach Sutherland as absolutely false.

Second – That the entire squad was indignant that such an article was published and that there was absolutely no foundation for such statements.

Third – That to make it clear to the public that there is absolutely no basis for such statements, a unanimous vote of confidence and support is given to Coach Sutherland by the members of this squad." The entire squad signed the article.

The article in The Post and the loss to Carnegie Tech frustrations were taken out on the Westminster eleven in Pitt stadium to the tune of 88 to 0. "The boys who sit on the bench during the big games, report faithfully each day for practice, furnish the opposition for the varsity during scrimmages and eagerly await the day when they will be the cynosure of all eyes as regulars, got their chances yesterday." The Westminster defense had no answer for the Pitt offensive attack as the Panthers scored 13 touchdowns and converted 10 extra points. Westminster finished the season with a 1-4-1 record.

The Pitt lineup for the game against Westminster was Blair McMillin (left end), Chester Wasmuth (left tackle), Albert DiMeolo (left guard), Richard Goldberg (center), John Breen (right guard), William Kern (right tackle), Albert Guarino (right end), James Rooney (quarterback), Charles Crabb (left halfback), Joseph Schmitt (right halfback) and Allan Booth (fullback). Substitutes appearing in the game for Pitt were Dwight Fyock, Markley Barnes, Felix Demoise, Andrew Salata, Clyde Jack, Mike Getto, John Davis, Francis Donovan, Joseph Archibald, John Grindle, James Scanlon, Gilbert Welch, Alexander Fox, Philip Sargeant, Philip Goldberg and Alfred Amann.

=== West Virginia ===
Week 7: West Virginia at Pitt

Team	1	2	3	4	Total
West Virginia	0	0	7	0	7
• Pitt	0	7	0	10	17

- Date: November 6, 1926
- Location: Pitt Stadium
  Pittsburgh, PA
- Game start: 2:00 p.m.
- Game attendance: 40,000
- Referee: Ed Thorp (De LaSalle)

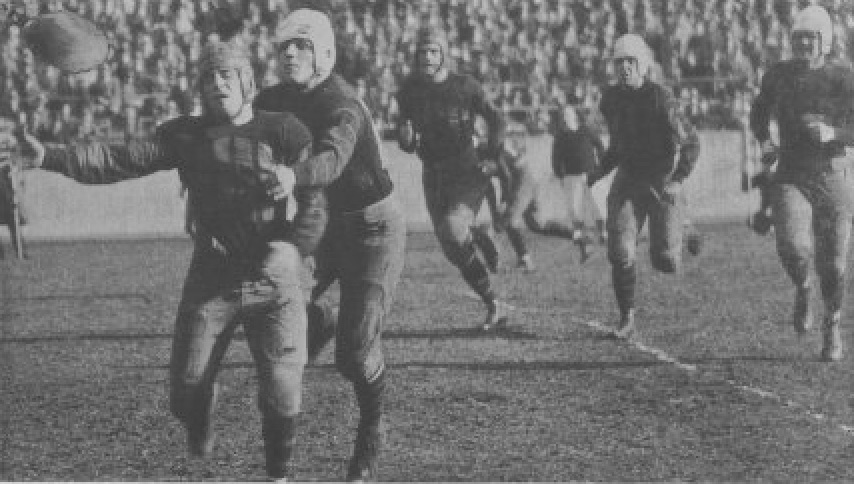
Welch Batting A Pass Away during the November 6, 1926 Pitt vs. West Virginia game

The Pitt versus West Virginia game was not yet called the "Backyard Brawl" but The Pittsburgh Sunday Post recognized the significance of the affair: "This game has come to be regarded locally as a real gridiron classic. For years it was played as one of Pitt's early games, but of late it has increased in importance and interest, until it is now recognized as one of the real 'big games' of the year." Second-year coach Ira "Rat" Rodgers had his team 5–1 on the season with the lone loss to Missouri 27 to 0 at Morgantown. The Panthers led the all-time series with the Mountaineers 13–7–1.

Mountaineer quarterback Ed Morrison was injured in the Missouri game and was not in the starting lineup. "The big fellow has been a tower of strength to his club in the last several seasons...If he does not get into action today, his team will be greatly weakened, but not demoralized by any means." Coach Rogers stated to the Pittsburgh Gazette Times: "I expect Pitt to play its best game of the year against us, but we will be fighting for every inch."

Coach Sutherland had Pitt line up the same way as other recent big games. He had the Panthers "relegate the 'huddle' to the scrap heap in order to speed up her attack." "I believe we will be able to put our best foot forward tomorrow," he declared. "The game looks like a very even match to me and naturally I hope we prove to have enough of an edge to win it."

The Pittsburgh Press reported: "The Pitt Panthers found themselves yesterday, and started a drive for late-season vindication of themselves and their coach with a smashing and thrilling victory over their ancient rivals from Morgantown. Almost 40,000 spectators, evenly divided in their support of the two teams, witnessed the Blue and Gold reach her top form of the season to carve out the 17 to 7 triumph."

Pitt scored in the second quarter after a 54 yard drive. From the 6-yard line "(Gilbert) Welch cut inside left end for a touchdown, going over the line standing. (Allan) Booth's try for point hit the crossbar and bounced over for the seventh point." West Virginia tied the game in the third quarter. Welch fumbled on an end run and West Virginia recovered on the Pitt 2-yard line. On fourth down Mountaineer fullback Hardy bulled his way over the goal line. He was successful with the placement kick and the game was tied 7 to 7. At the end of the third quarter Pitt was in possession on the Mountaineer 18-yard line. The Pitt offense advanced the ball to the West Virginia 13-yard line and the West Virginia defense stiffened. James Rooney kicked a 20 yard field goal and the Panthers were ahead 10–7. The teams proceeded to swap fumbles and Pitt ended up with possession on the Mountaineer 30-yard line. Four running plays advanced the ball to the 20-yard line and "Welch ran inside left end and covered 20 yards for a touchdown, going over with a tackler hanging on to his leg. Rooney kicked the seventh point from placement with Welch holding the ball." Final Score: Pitt 17, West Va. 7. West Virginia finished the season with a 6–4 record.

As Ed Thorp, "one of the finest officials in the country", was leaving the field, he "was assaulted by a party of men in civilian dress...and was struck by one of them, said to be Aaron Oliker, a player on last year's team. The official took steps to defend himself, but before a general melee could ensue, police officers and cool-headed spectators intervened."

The Pitt lineup for the game against West Virginia was Blair McMillin (left end), William Kern left tackle), Howard Linn (left guard), Andrew Cutler (center), John Roberts (right guard), Chester Wasmuth (right ackle), Albert Guarino (right end), Paul Fisher (quarterback), Gilbert Welch (left halfback), James Hagan (right halfback) and Allan Booth (fullback). Substitutes appearing in the game for Pitt were Felix Demoise, Clyde Jack, James Rooney, Joseph Schmitt, Albert DiMeolo, Dwight Fyock, Mike Getto, Andrew Salata, Charles Crabb, James Scanlon and Walter Hoban.

=== Washington & Jefferson ===
Week 8: Washington & Jefferson at Pitt

Team	1	2	3	4	Total
W. & J.	0	0	0	0	0
Pitt	0	0	0	0	0

- Date: November 13, 1926
- Location: Pitt Stadium
  Pittsburgh, PA
- Game start: 2:00 p.m.
- Game attendance: 50,000
- Game weather: fair
- Referee: E. J. O'Brien (Tufts)

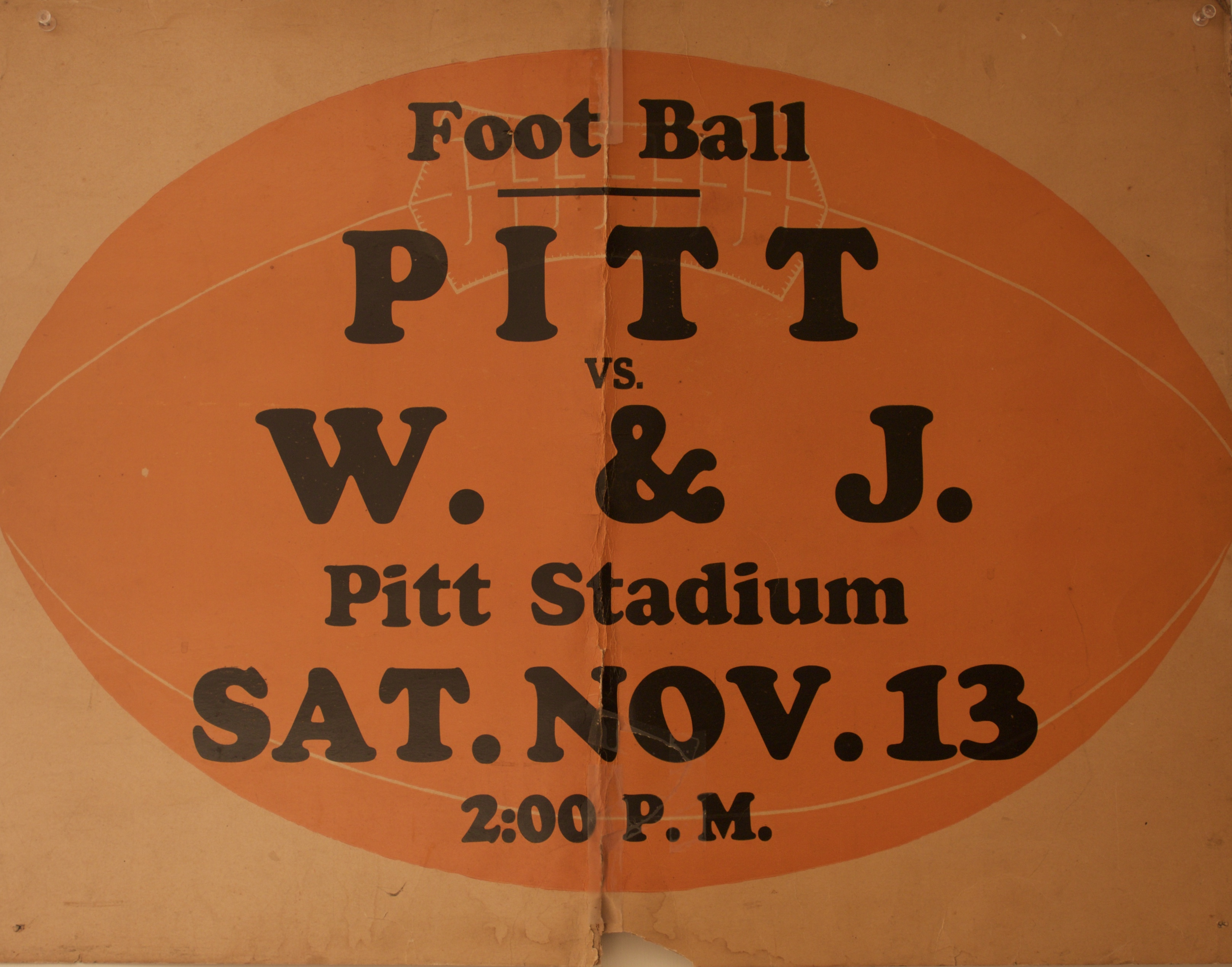
1926 Pitt versus Washington & Jefferson advertising poster

The next game on the schedule was the 27th meeting with rival Washington & Jefferson. Each team owned 13 wins in the series. The Pittsburgh Sunday Post noted: "Andy Kerr, who for so many years aided Pittsburgh athletic teams in scoring triumphs, first with schools and then the University of Pittsburgh, will be the generalissimo of Wash – Jeff when they invade Pitt next Saturday to clash with the Panthers." Coach Kerr had his team 6–1 on the season, with the lone loss to Lafayette on Franklin Field, Philadelphia 16–10. The Presidents were led on the field by All-America fullback Bill Amos. "Coach Kerr's men are in the very pink of condition. They have been well rested, many of them not having played for two weeks. They are expected to be in top form."

Gilbert Welch, James Hagen, Blair McMillin and Howard Linn were all nursing injuries suffered in the West Virginia game. Coach Sutherland spoke with The Pittsburgh Press: "I don't think I can be called pessimistic when I say that we are not nursing any false hopes. W. & J. is rightly the favorite. The Presidents are the best outfit on our very hard schedule and we know it. We go into this game with our backs to the wall, but under such conditions some teams do super-deeds. I have the fullest confidence in my team."

Max E. Hannum of the Press reported: "Panther and president stalwarts, fired with a high resolve and reaching the peak of their season's form, met and fought for a bitter 60 minutes at the Pitt stadium yesterday, shook hands without rancor and with mutual respect at the end, and left the field with a drawn 0 to 0 verdict, as close to 50,000 spectators paid tribute to two great and game elevens."

Each team had a scoring opportunity in the first quarter. The Presidents attempted a 23 yard field goal that narrowly missed. Pitt recovered a fumbled punt on the Presidents' 8-yard line. The Panthers advanced the ball to the 3-yard line and turned it over on downs. They did not get that close again. In the second quarter Pitt quarterback James Rooney tried a field goal from the W. & J. 23-yard line that was wide of the uprights. The defense of both teams controlled the remainder of the game. Andy Kerr's Presidents finished the season with a 7–1–1 record.

The Pitt lineup for the game against Washington & Jefferson was Blair McMillin (left end), William Kern (left tackle), Howard Linn (left guard), Andrew Cutler (center), John Roberts (right guard), Chester Wasmuth (right tackle), Albert Guarino (right end), Paul Fisher (quarterback), Gilbert Welch (left halfback), James Hagan (right halfback), and Allan Booth (fullback). Substitutes appearing in the game for Pitt were James Rooney, Joseph Schmitt, Albert DiMeolo, Felix Demoise, Markley Barnes, Andrew Salata, and Dwight Fyock.

=== Penn State ===
Week 9: Penn State at Pitt

Team	1	2	3	4	Total
Penn State	0	6	0	0	6
• Pitt	0	7	0	17	24

- Date: November 25, 1926
- Location: Pitt Stadium
  Pittsburgh, PA
- Game start: 2:00 p.m.
- Game attendance: 50,000
- Game weather: ideal
- Referee: Wilmer G. Crowell (Swarthmore)

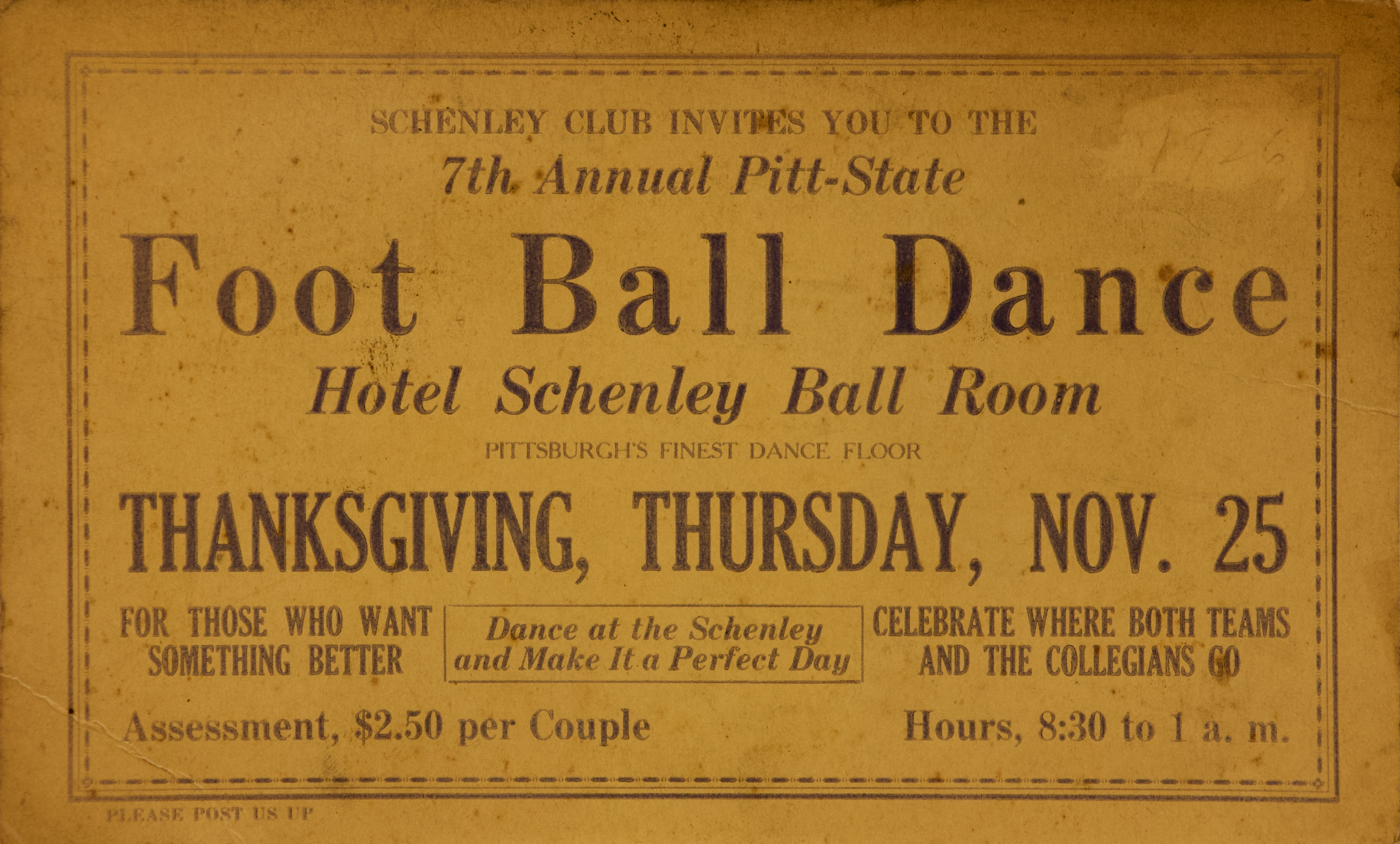
Advertisement for Pitt-Penn State game football dance on November 25, 1926

Hugo Bezdek marched his ninth squad of Lions down from Mount Nittany for the annual Thanksgiving Day tussle with the Pitt Panthers. His squad was 5–3 on the season having lost to Notre Dame, Penn and Syracuse. Penn State beat Pitt once in the last thirteen years but Pitt only led the overall series 13–12 with two ties. State has been pointing for this game all season and "has saved many new pet plays for use in this contest. The offensive strength of the Lions has been demonstrated by the heavy scores they have amassed against their early opponents, even though they were of the 'set-up' type." The Lions lead the district in points scored.

Coach Sutherland spoke with The Pittsburgh Press: "Penn State is primed for us, with their team in the best of condition and we are not going to have an easy moment of it. Penn State has a much better team than she has generally been credited with, and this is the one game of the season that she genuinely wants to win more than all the others."

The Pitt Weekly recapped: "After giving the Pitt Panther a scare during the first half, the Nittany Lion became the Nittany Lamb the remainder of the Thanksgiving game in the stadium to permit Gibby Welch and the other Panthers to romp off with a 24–6 victory. The largest crowd ever to attend an athletic event in the stadium or any other arena in the city witnessed the classic under ideal weather conditions."

After a scoreless first quarter that saw Penn State botch two scoring chances, Pitt gained possession on their 45-yard line early in the second stanza. On first down "Welch sped around right end, reversed his field and dashed down the field for a touchdown, a run of 54 yards." James Rooney added the point after and Pitt led 7 to 0. State recovered a fumble on the Pitt 29-yard line. The Panthers defense stopped the drive on the 3-yard line and punted out of danger, but a pass from John Roepke to Ken Weston placed the Lions back on the Pitt 3-yard line. On third down Roepke smashed through the line for the touchdown. His placement kick was low and Pitt led at halftime 7 to 6. "Roepke's kicking misfortunes plagued him in the third quarter as well when he shanked a 23 yard field goal." The Panthers owned the fourth quarter. James Hagan intercepted a State lateral and Pitt had possession on the State 44-yard line. The Panther offense advanced the ball inside the 10-yard line and Rooney booted a 23 yard field goal to put the Panthers ahead 10 to 6. Rooney promptly intercepted a Roepke pass and Pitt had possession on the State 30-yard line. On second down "Welch circled right end for a touchdown." Rooney converted the placement and Pitt led 17 to 6. Pitt kicked off and Blair McMillin intercepted Roepke's pass to give Pitt possession on the State 25-yard line. On the fifth play from scrimmage Joseph Schmitt went off-tackle into the end zone from the four. Rooney's kicking remained perfect with the placement and Pitt beat State for the fifth-year in a row - 24 to 6.

Gibby Welch was clearly the star of the game. "He gained a total of 205 yards from scrimmage, these including long runs of 53, 30, 25, 22 and 20 yards."

Pitt guard Howard "Tiny" Linn summarized the feeling of the team after the game: "Gibby made the gains, the linemen made the holes, but you can kick this around, it was ol' Jock who taught us how to do all these things and we are for him; he's a gentleman and a football coach... An' we don't give a hoot who knows it."

The Pitt lineup for the game against Penn State was Blair McMillin (left end), William Kern (left tackle), Howard Linn (left guard). Andrew Cutler (center), John Roberts (right guard), Chester Wasmuth (right tackle), Albert Guarino (right end), Paul Fisher (quarterback), Gilbert Welch (left halfback), James Hagan (right halfback) and Allan Booth (fullback). Substitutes appearing in the game for Pitt were Andrew Salata, James Rooney, Dwight Fyock, Albert DiMeolo, Joseph Schmitt, Mike Getto, Markley Barnes, Joseph Archibald and Clyde Jack.

== Scoring summary ==
1926 Pittsburgh Panthers scoring summary
Player	Touchdowns	Extra points	Field goals	Safety	Points
Gibby Welch	10	0	0	0	60
Joseph Schmitt	4	0	0	0	24
James Rooney	2	6	2	0	24
Allan A. Booth	2	5	0	0	17
Dwight Fyock	2	0	0	0	12
Andrew Salata	0	7	0	0	7
James Hagan	1	0	0	0	6
Paul Fisher	1	0	0	0	6
John Grindle	1	0	0	0	6
Alexander Fox	1	0	0	0	6
Andrew Cutler	0	0	0	1	2
Totals	24	18	2	1	170

== Postseason ==
The 1926 football season followed the departure of eight veterans from the 1925 team. Under head coach John B. Sutherland, the team competed against a difficult schedule with a roster that included many inexperienced players. Captain Blair McMillin served as team captain during the season. The team experienced early-season losses before improving over the course of the season.

The following players were awarded letters for the 1926 season: Blair McMillin, Andrew Cutler, Howard Linn, Andrew Salata, John Roberts, William Kern, Felix Demoise, James Hagan, James Rooney, Joseph Schmitt, Allan Booth, Albert Guarino, Gilbert Welch, Clyde Jack, Chester Wasmuth, Paul Fisher, Markley Barnes, Dwight Fyock, Albert DiMeolo and Manager John B. McCrady.

At the annual postseason football banquet, the lettermen voted Gilbert "Gibby" Welch captain for the 1927 season by a narrow 10-9 margin over Andrew Cutler. Welch led the nation in rushing yards with 1964, but he was left off the major All-America teams.

William McKee, a junior in the School of Business Administration, was appointed varsity football manager for the 1927 team by Karl E. Davis, graduate manager of athletics.

Ralph Davis of The Pittsburgh Press opined about Jock Sutherland's rocky season:

"Dr. John Bain Sutherland, head coach at Pitt, has nothing to regret as he looks back upon the 1926 grid season... Jock made numerous friends by his absolute silence while unwarranted attacks were being made upon him by a slim minority, which showed its true color – yellow – when the Panthers lost two games on their terrifically hard schedule...But Sutherland kept his feet on the ground, his head in the air, and sawed wood. He had important tasks ahead, and he attended strictly and solely to them.... Sutherland will have much better material with which to work next fall than he had this year. He inherits a wonderful lot of freshmen, and he loses few men from his present varsity squad. Pitt ought to have a great season next year, and Dr. J. B. S. should be sitting pretty one year hence. In which case, the very persons who have knocked him the hardest and the most unreasonably this fall, and who have been making cracks about 'buying his contract' and a lot of other silly twaddle, will be slapping him on the back, and hailing him as the greatest ever. It's the way of the world, and Jock knows it."

"At the end of the 1926 season Dr. Sutherland's coaching contract was renewed, and this became a habit henceforward."

Charley Bowser, who led Grove City to a 7–0 record, joined Jock Sutherland's staff as assistant coach to replace Guy Williamson. Williamson resigned to devote more time to his private business.

Freshman coach H. Clifford Carlson's eleven finished the season undefeated (6–0) and ranked number one in the nation.
