= 1926 All-Eastern football team =

American football team

The 1926 All-Eastern football team consists of American football players chosen by various selectors as the best players at each position among the Eastern colleges and universities during the 1926 college football season.

The 1926 Penn Quakers football team compiled a 7–1–1 record and led all other teams with three players named by at least one selector to the first team.

Three players received first-team honors on the All-Eastern team and were also consensus first-team picks on the 1926 All-America college football team: end Vic Hanson of Syracuse; tackle Frank Wickhorst of Navy; and guard Harry Connaughton of Georgetown.

Four of the players who received All-Eastern honors in 1926 were later inducted to the College Football Hall of Fame: Hanson of Syracuse; Wickhorst of Navy; tackle Bud Sprague of Army; and guard Herbert Sturhahn of Yale.

== All-Eastern selections ==
=== Quarterbacks ===
- Roy Randall, Brown (AP-1, BDE-1, TJ-1, BT-2)
- Jack Connor, NYU (BT-1, TJ-3)
- Edwin B. Dooley, Dartmouth (AP-2)
- Dan Caulkins, Princeton (TJ-2)
- Philip W. Bunnell, Yale (BT-3)

=== Halfbacks ===
- Harry Wilson, Army (AP-2, BDE-1, BT-1, TJ-1)
- Charles Rodgers, Penn (AP-1, BDE-1, BT-2)
- Frank Kirkleski, Lafayette (AP-1, TJ-1 [fb])
- George B. Wilson, Lafayette (BDE-1, BT-1)
- Tom Hamilton, Navy (TJ-1, BT-2)
- Jacob Slagle, Princeton (AP-2)
- Mischel, Brown (TJ-2)
- Nick Borelli, Muhlenberg (BT-3)
- Earl Graham, Fordham (TJ-3)
- Bridges, Princeton (TJ-3)

=== Fullbacks ===
- Bill Amos, Washington & Jefferson (AP-1, BT-1, TJ-2)
- Shaughnessy, Colgate (AP-2, BT-3)
- Bill Donohoe, Carnegie Tech (BT-3, TJ-2)
- Ken Strong, NYU (BT-2)
- Robert MacPhail, Dartmouth (TJ-3)

=== Ends ===
- Vic Hanson, Syracuse (AP-1, BDE-1, BT-1, TJ-1)
- Hal Broda, Brown (AP-1, BDE-1, BT-1, TJ-1)
- Born, Army (AP-2, TJ-3)
- Frank Grube, Lafayette (BT-3, TJ-2)
- Cal Hubbard, Geneva (AP-2)
- Tom Leary, Fordham (BT-2)
- George Thayer, Penn (BT-2)
- Lloyd, Navy (TJ-2)
- Ralph Furey, Columbia (BT-3)
- Thurston Towle, Brown (TJ-3)

=== Tackles ===
- Frank Wickhorst, Navy (AP-1, BDE-1, BT-1, TJ-1)
- Bud Sprague, Army (AP-1, BDE-1, BT-3)
- Lloyd Yoder, Carnegie Tech (TJ-1, BT-3)
- Al Lassman, NYU (AP-2, BT-2, TJ-1)
- Eddy, Navy (BT-1)
- Harold Cothran, Lafayette (AP-2, TJ-2)
- Edwin Kevorkian, Brown (BT-2)
- Richards, Yale (TJ-3)
- Paul Hodge, Brown (TJ-3)

=== Guards ===
- Harry Connaughton, Georgetown (AP-1, BDE-1, BT-1, TJ-1)
- Herbert Sturhahn, Yale (AP-2, BDE-1, TJ-1, BT-2)
- Emerson Carey, Cornell (AP-1, BT-2, TJ-2)
- Ernest Schmidt, Army (AP-2, BT-1, TJ-3)
- Orland F. Smith, Brown (TJ-2)
- Baldwin, Princeton (BT-3)
- Pauley, Washington & Jefferson (BT-3)
- John Davis, Princeton (TJ-3)

=== Centers ===
- John Butler, Penn (AP-1, BDE-1, TJ-1, BT-2)
- Maurice Daly, Army (BT-1)
- Josh Davis, Dartmouth (AP-2, BT-3)
- Bartel, Princeton (TJ-2)
- Look, Yale (TJ-3)

== Key ==
- AP = Associated Press
- BDE = Brooklyn Daily Eagle
- BT = The Brooklyn Daily Times
- TJ = Tad Jones, head coach of Yale

== See also ==
- 1926 College Football All-America Team
