= Hal Broda =

American football player (1905–1985)

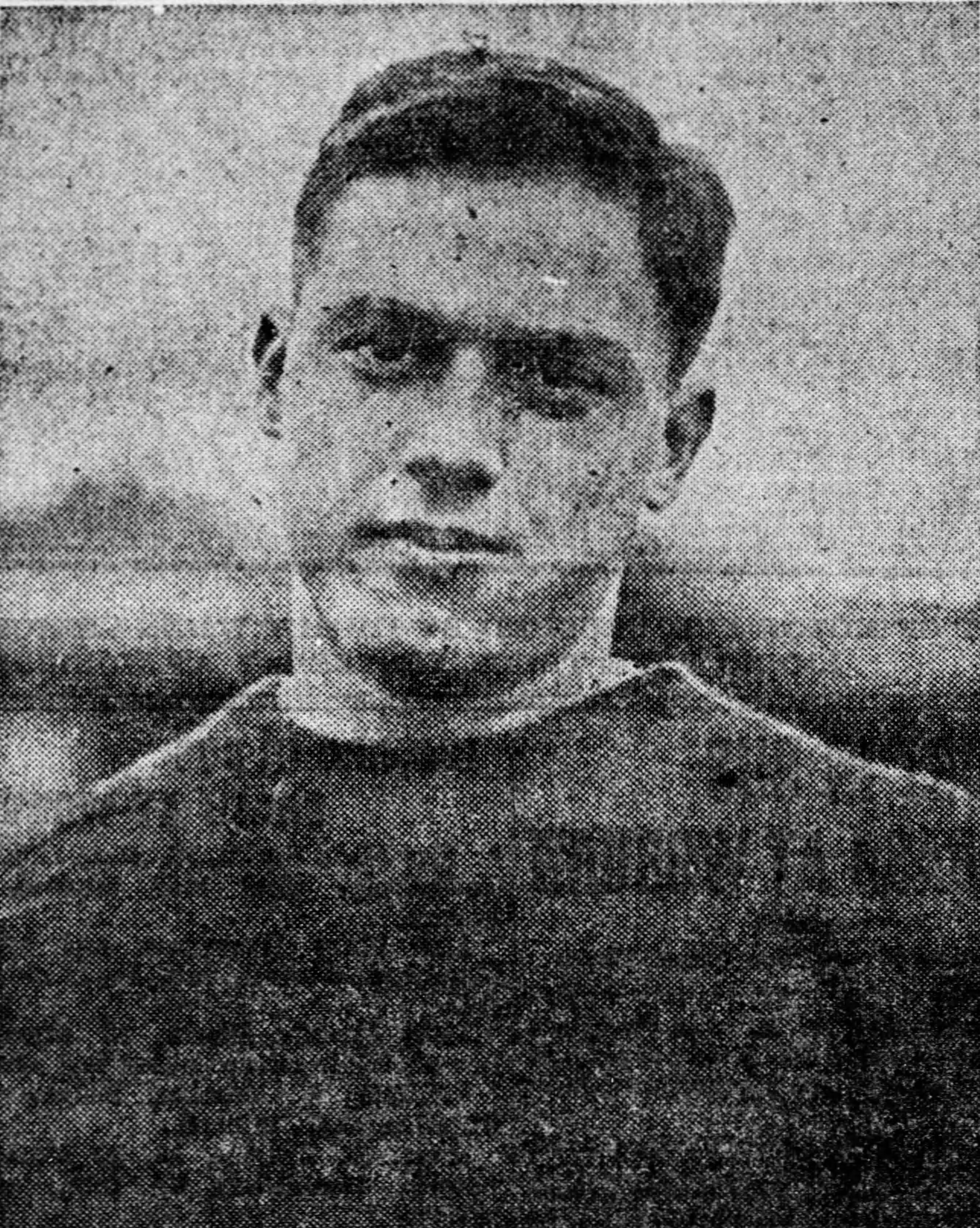

Profile
- Position: End

Personal information
- Born: July 27, 1905; Canton, Ohio, U.S.
- Died: February 13, 1989 (aged 83); Broward County, Florida, U.S.
- Listed height: 6 ft 1 in (1.85 m)
- Listed weight: 180 lb (82 kg)

Career information
- High school: Canton (OH) McKinley
- College: Brown

Career history
- Cleveland Bulldogs (1927)

Awards and highlights
- First-team All-American (1926); First-team All-Eastern (1926)
- Stats at Pro Football Reference

Harold Albert Broda (July 27, 1905 – February 13, 1989) was an American football player. He played at the end position in the National Football League (NFL) for the 1927 Cleveland Bulldogs. He also played college football at Brown University, where he was selected by the Associated Press as a second-team player, and by Central Press Association and New York Sun as a first-team selection, on the 1926 College Football All-America Team.
