= Roy Randall =

Biographical details
- Born: April 26, 1904; Brockton, Massachusetts, U.S.
- Died: May 18, 1974 (aged 70); Tuckerton, New Jersey, U.S.

Playing career

Football
- 1925–1927: Brown
- Position: Quarterback

Coaching career (HC unless noted)

Football
- c. 1930: Virginia (assistant)
- 1933–1962: Haverford

Basketball
- 1929–1930: Virginia
- 1933–1941: Haverford

Baseball
- 1930: Virginia
- 1934–1942: Haverford
- 1946–1959: Haverford
- 1961–1969: Haverford

Administrative career (AD unless noted)
- 1946–1969: Haverford

Head coaching record
- Overall: 63–108–10 (football); 106–262–3 (baseball)

Accomplishments and honors

Awards
- First-team All-American (1926); First-team All-Eastern (1926)

Roy Earl "Red" Randall (April 26, 1904 – May 18, 1974) was an American football player, coach of football, basketball, and baseball, and college athletics administrator. He grew up in Brockton, Massachusetts, and played quarterback on the undefeated 1926 Brown Bears football team that became known as the "Iron Men" and compiled a 9–0–1 record. The All-America Board selected him as the first-team quarterback on the 1926 College Football All-America Team. In the 1930s, he became a football, basketball, and baseball coach, and later athletic director, at Haverford College in suburban Philadelphia. He retired in 1969.
