= Bud Sprague =

American football player (1904–1973)

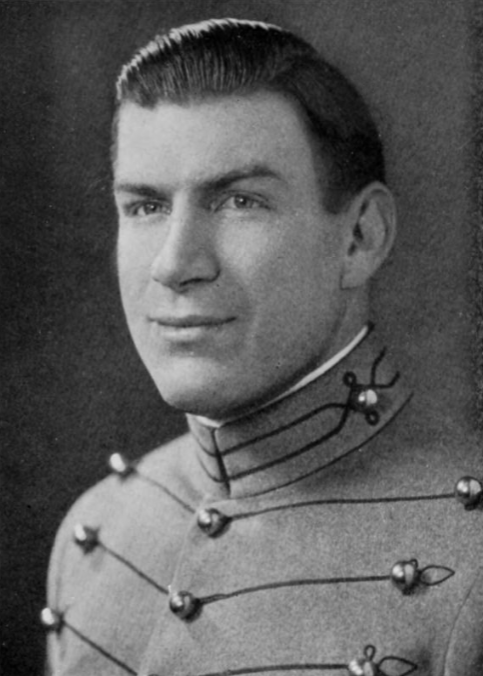
- Sprague at West Point in 1929

Profile
- Position: Tackle

Personal information
- Born: September 8, 1904; Dallas, Texas, U.S.
- Died: April 25, 1973 (aged 68); New York, New York, U.S.
- Listed height: 6 ft 2 in (1.88 m)
- Listed weight: 210 lb (95 kg)

Career information
- College: Texas (1922–1924); Army (1926–1928)

Awards and highlights
- Consensus All-American (1926); First-team All-American (1927); Second-team All-American (1925); 3× first-team All-Eastern (1926, 1927, 1928)
- College Football Hall of Fame (Class of 1970)

Mortimer Ernest "Bud" Sprague (September 8, 1904 – April 25, 1973) was an American college football player. He was elected to the College Football Hall of Fame in 1970.

Sprague was one of the eight children born to Minna and George Sprague, of the Oak Cliff neighborhood in Dallas. His father, George, served on the Dallas City Council and as the Mayor of Dallas from 1937 to 1939. Sprague first played at the University of Texas before transferring to the United States Military Academy. He was captain of the 1928 Army Cadets football team. Three of his younger brothers—Howard, Johnny, and Charlie—captained football teams at Southern Methodist University (SMU). Sprague later became an insurance executive. He died of cancer, on April 25, 1973, at his home in Manhattan.
