= Emerson Carey =

American football player (1906–1983)

Profile
- Positions: Guard, Center

Personal information
- Born: January 26, 1906; Hutchinson, Kansas, U.S.
- Died: May 15, 1983 (age 77); Escondido, California, U.S.

Career information
- College: Cornell University

Career history
- 1924–1926: Cornell Big Red

Awards and highlights
- Second-team All-American (1926); First-team All-Eastern (1926)

Emerson Carey, Jr. (January 26, 1906 - May 15, 1983) was an American football player. He was a first-team All-American while attending Cornell University in 1926.

Carey was the son of Emerson Carey, Sr., the leading salt manufacturer in Hutchinson, Kansas, a community that became known as "Salt City."

Carey enrolled at Cornell University where he played at the guard and center positions on the Cornell Big Red football team from 1924 to 1926. He was captain of Cornell's 1926 team that compiled a record of 6-1-1. Based on a poll of 500 newspapers and the compilation of a million votes, Carey was selected by the Central Press Association as a first-team guard on its 1926 College Football All-America Team. He was also selected as a second-team All-American by the Associated Press.

Carey received a Bachelor of Laws degree from Cornell in 1928. He was married in 1926 to Mary Margaret Slavens, and they had three children, Emerson III, born May 6, 1929, Annabelle, born May 8, 1931, and Randolph born April 28, 1934. Carey worked for the company his father founded, the Carey Salt Company (at one time, the largest salt mine in North America), and for the Emerson Carey Investment Corporation, which included industries in fiber products, ice and cold storage, printing, investments and insurance. He also served on the boards of directors of the Hutchinson State Bank and Hutchinson Chamber of Commerce. Carey was inducted into the Cornell Hall of Fame in 1994.
