= 1926 All-America college football team =

Official list of the best college football players of 1926

The 1926 All-America college football team is composed of college football players who were selected as All-Americans by various organizations and writers that chose All-America college football teams in 1926. The six selectors recognized by the NCAA as "official" for the 1926 season are (1) Collier's Weekly, as selected by Grantland Rice with cooperation from ten coaches, (2) the Associated Press, based on polling of "more than 100 coaches and critics", (3) the United Press, (4) the All-America Board, selected by Knute Rockne (Notre Dame), Glenn "Pop" Warner (Stanford), and Tad Jones (Yale), (5) the International News Service (INS), and (6) the Newspaper Enterprise Association (NEA).

Other notable selectors included Billy Evans, the Central Press Association, the New York Sun, and Walter Eckersall.

== Consensus All-Americans ==
For the year 1926, the NCAA recognizes six All-American teams as "official" designations for purposes of its consensus determinations. The following chart identifies the NCAA-recognized consensus All-Americans and displays which first-team designations they received.

Name	Position	School	Number	Official	Other
Frank Wickhorst	Tackle	Navy	6/6	AAB, AP, COL, INS, NEA, UP	BE, CP, CEP, HF, LP, NYS, RG, WC, WE
Herb Joesting	Fullback	Minnesota	5/6	AAB, AP, COL, INS, NEA	BE, CP, ES, LP, NYS, RG, WC, WE
Bud Boeringer	Center	Notre Dame	5/6	AAB, AP, COL, INS, NEA	BE, CP, ES, LP, NYS, RG, WC, WE
Mort Kaer	Halfback	USC	5/6	AAB, AP, COL, INS, NEA	BE, CP, NYS, RG, WC, WE
Bernie Shively	Guard	Illinois	5/6	AAB, AP, COL, INS, NEA	BE, WC, WE
Harry Connaughton	Guard	Georgetown	4/6	AP, COL, NEA, UP	BE, CP, ES, HF, LP, NYS, RG, WE
Benny Friedman	Quarterback	Michigan	4/6	AP, COL, INS, NEA	BE, CP, ES, HF, LP, NYS, RG, WE
Bennie Oosterbaan	End	Michigan	4/6	AAB, COL, NEA, UP	BE, CEP, ES, WC, WE
Vic Hanson	End	Syracuse	4/6	AP, COL, INS, UP	ES, HF, LP, NYS, WE
Ralph Baker	Halfback	Northwestern	2/6	AP, COL	CP, LP, NYS, WE
Bud Sprague	Tackle	Army	1/6	AP	CP, CEP

== All-American selections for 1926 ==
=== Ends ===
- Bennie Oosterbaan, Michigan (CFHOF) (AAB-1; AP-3; COL-1; NEA; UP; CEP-1; WC-1; BE-1; RG-2; ES-1; WE-1)
- Vic Hanson, Syracuse (CFHOF) (AAB-2; AP-1; COL-1; INS-1; UP; CP-2; NYS-1; BE-2; HF-1; LP-1; RJW-2; RG-2; DW-1; ES-1; WE-1)
- Hal Broda, Brown (AAB-3; AP-2; INS-2; UP; CP-1; NYS-1; BE-3; HF-1; LP-2; RWJ-3; RG-1; ES-2; WE-2)
- Hoyt Winslett, Alabama (AAB-2; AP-1; INS-1; NEA; CP-2; NYS-2; BE-1; LP-1, RWJ-2; ES-2; WE-3; CP-1)
- Ted Shipkey, Stanford (AAB-1; AP-2; INS-2; WC-1; NYS-2; BE-2; LP-2; RG-1; WE-2)
- Carl Bacchus, Missouri (AAB-3; AP-3; BE-3; RWJ-3)
- Cal Hubbard, Geneva (INS-3; RG-3; CEP-1)
- Ed Lindenmeyer, Missouri (INS-3)
- George Thayer, Penn (WE-3)
- Charles Born, Army (RG-3)

=== Tackles ===
- Frank Wickhorst, Navy (AAB-1; AP-1; COL-1; INS-1; NEA; UP; CP-1; WC-1; NYS-1; BE-1; HF-1; LP-1; RG-1; WE-1; CEP-1)
- Bud Sprague, Army (AP-1; CP-1; RG-3; CEP-1; LP-2)
- Lloyd Yoder, Carnegie Tech (CFHOF) (AAB-1; AP-3; INS-2; CP-2; WC-1)
- Lon Stiner, Nebraska (AAB-2; INS-1; RWJ-2; ES-2)
- Robert Johnson, Northwestern (NEA; BE-1; RG-1; WE-2)
- Alfred "Al" Lassman, NYU (AAB-3; UP; BE-3; HF-1; RWJ-3; RG-2; ES-1; WE-2)
- Orland Smith, Brown (AP-3; COL-1; LP-1; NYS-2; WE-1)
- Spike Nelson, Iowa (AP-2; CP-2; NYS-1; BE-2; LP-2; RG-3)
- Theodore "Tiny" Roebuck, Haskell (AAB-2; RWJ-2)
- Jim Dixon, Oregon State (AAB-3; INS-2; RWJ-3)
- D. Thomas Eddy, Navy (AP-2; NYS-2; ES-2)
- Fred Pickhard, Alabama (BE-2)
- Jesse Hibbs, USC (BE-3)
- Howard D. Cothran, Lafayette (RG-2; WE-3)
- Leo Raskowski, Ohio State (INS-3; ES-1; WE-3)
- Ed Kevorkian, Brown (INS-3)

=== Guards ===
- Bernie Shively, Illinois (CFHOF) (AAB-1; AP-1; COL-1; INS-1; NEA; CP-2; WC-1; BE-1; RG-2; WE-1)
- Harry Connaughton, Georgetown (AAB-2; AP-1; COL-1; INS-2; NEA; UP; CP-1; NYS-1; BE-1; HF-1; LP-1; RWJ-2; RG-1; ES-1; WE-1)
- Ed Hess, Ohio State (AAB-2; AP-2; INS-2; CP-1; NYS-2; BE-2; HF-1; LP-2; RWJ-2; RG-1; ES-1; WE-2; CEP-1)
- Edwin Hayes, Ohio State (UP)
- Fred H. Swan, Stanford (AAB-3; AP-3; INS-3; CP-2; RWJ-3; ES-2; CEP-1; LP-2)
- Herbert Sturhahn, Yale (CFHOF) (AAB-1; AP-3; WC-1; NYS-2; BE-3; ES-2; LP-1; RG-3; WE-2)
- Ted "Butter" Gorrell, USC (AAB-3; RWJ-3)
- Emerson Carey, Cornell (AP-2; RWJ-2; WE-3; RG-3)
- Ernest Schmidt, Army (NYS-1; BE-2)
- Orland Smith, Brown (INS-1; BE-3; RG-2)
- Frank Mayer, Notre Dame (INS-3)
- John H. Lovette, Michigan (WE-3)

=== Centers ===
- Bud Boeringer, Notre Dame (AAB-1; AP-1; COL-1; INS-1; NEA; CP-1; WC-1; NYS-1; BE-1; LP-1; RG-1; ES-1; WE-1)
- John J. Butler, Penn (AP-2; INS-3; UP; CP-2; BE-2; HF-1; RG-2; ES-2; WE-2)
- Jeff Cravath, USC (AAB-2; INS-2; RWJ-2)
- Larry Bettencourt, St. Mary's (CA) (CFHOF) (AAB-3; RWJ-3)
- Pollock Wallace, Oklahoma (AP-3)
- Alex Klein, Ohio State (BE-3)
- Maurice Daly, Army (NYS-2)
- Robert Reitsch, Illinois (RG-3; WE-3)
- Joseph Truskowski, Michigan (LP-2)

=== Quarterbacks ===
- Benny Friedman, Michigan (CFHOF) (AAB-2; AP-1; COL-1; INS-1; NEA; CP-1; NYS-1; BE-1; HF-1; LP-1; RWJ-2; RG-1; ES-1; WE-1)
- Bill Spears, Vanderbilt (CFHOF) (AAB-3 [as hb]; AP-2; INS-2; NYS-2; BE-2; LP-2; RWJ-3 [as hb])
- Bill Kelly, Montana (CFHOF) (AP-2 [as hb]; BE-3 [as hb]; CP-2; RG-2; WE-3)
- Roy Randall, Brown (AAB-1; WC-1)
- Butch Meeker, Washington State (WE-2)
- George Guttormsen, Washington (AP-3; INS-3)
- Gerald Mann, SMU (CFHOF) (AAB-3; BE-3; RWJ-3)
- Dan Caulkins, Princeton (RG-3)

=== Halfbacks ===
- Mort Kaer, USC (CFHOF) (AAB-1; AP-1; COL-1; INS-1; NEA; CP-1; WC-1; NYS-1; BE-1; RG-1; ES-2 [as qb]; WE-1)
- Ralph Baker, Northwestern (CFHOF) (AAB-2; AP-1; COL-1; INS-2; CP-1; NYS-1; BE-2; LP-1; RWJ-2; RG-2; ES-2; WE-1)
- Harry Wilson, Army (AAB-1; AP-2; INS-1; NEA; CP-2; WC-1; ES-1)
- Tom Hamilton, Navy (UP; HF-1; RG-3; WE-2)
- Marty Karow, Ohio State (UP; AP-2; INS-3; CP-2; BE-3; HF-1; LP-2; RG-2; ES-2; WE-3)
- Frank Kirkleski, Lafayette (AAB-3; AP-3; RWJ-3)
- Charles Rogers, Penn (AP-3; INS-3; UP; HF-1; RG-1; WE-2)
- Chester "Cotton" Wilcox, Purdue (NYS-2; LP-2; RG-3; BE-2)
- George Bogue, Stanford (BE-3; WE-3)
- Christie Flanagan, Notre Dame (AAB-2; CP-2; RWJ-2; RG-2; ES-1)
- Dave Mishel, Brown (INS-2)
- George Wilson, Lafayette (INS-3; BE-1; NYS-2)
- Dick Hyland, Stanford (LP-1)

=== Fullbacks ===
- Herb Joesting, Minnesota (CFHOF) (AAB-1; AP-1; COL-1; INS-1; NEA; BE-1; CP-1; ES-1; NYS-1; RG-1; LP-1; WC-1; WE-1)
- Bill Amos, Washington & Jefferson (AAB-2; INS-2; BE-2; RWJ-2; WE-2)
- Mayes McLain, Haskell (AAB-3; RWJ-3)
- Ty Rauber, Washington & Lee (AP-3)
- Harry O'Boyle, Notre Dame (LP-2 [hb]; NYS-2)
- Henry H. Caldwell, Navy (ES-2)
- Tiny Lewis, Northwestern (RG-3; WE-3)

== Key ==
- **Bold** – Used for (1) consensus All-Americans and (2) first-team selections by an official selector
- CFHOF = College Football Hall of Fame inductee
- 1 – First-team selection
- 2 – Second-team selection
- 3 – Third-team selection

=== Official selectors ===
- AAB = All-American Board, team selected by three coaches: Knute Rockne (Notre Dame), Glenn "Pop" Warner (Stanford), and Tad Jones (Yale)
- AP = Associated Press, based on AP polling of "more than 100 coaches and critics"
- UP = United Press
- COL = Collier's Weekly as selected by Grantland Rice with cooperation from ten coaches: Glenn Warner (Stanford), Robert Zuppke (Illinois), G.C. Woodruff (Georgia), Knute Rockne (Notre Dame), Wallace Wade (Alabama), Captain J.J. McEwan (Oregon), W.A. Alexander (Ga. Tech.), Howard Jones (So. Calif.), E.P. Madigan (St. Mary's, Calif.), and Dan McGuigan (Vanderbilt).
- INS = International News Service, selected by Davis Walsh
- NEA = Newspaper Enterprise Association

=== Other selectors ===
- BE = Billy Evans
- CP = Central Press Association, based on a poll conducted by Norman Brown of over 400 newspapers, each of which conducted its own election in which fans voted for the All-American team; Central Press reported compiling a million votes.
- CEP = Charles E. Parker for the New York World News Service
- ES = Ed Sullivan
- HF = Henry Farrell of the United Press
- LP = Lawrence Perry
- NYS = New York Sun
- RG = Red Grange
- WC = Walter Camp Football Foundation
- WE = Walter Eckersall

== See also ==
- 1926 All-Big Ten Conference football team
- 1926 All-Eastern football team
- 1926 All-Missouri Valley Conference football team
- 1926 All-Pacific Coast football team
- 1926 All-Southern college football team
