= Bill Amos =

American football player and coach (1898–1987)

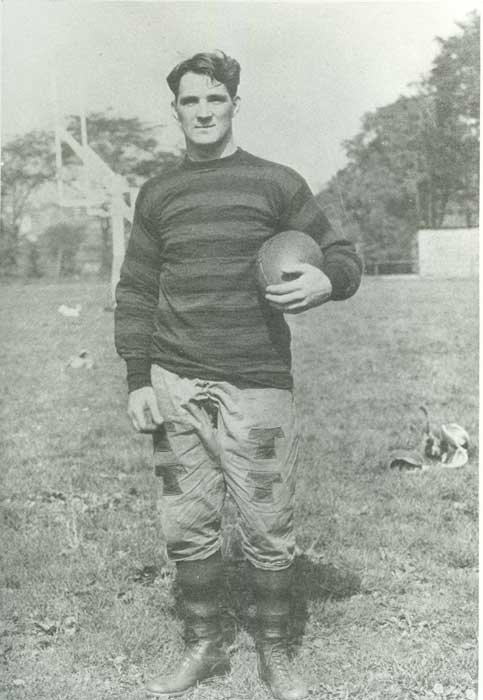

Biographical details
- Born: July 6, 1898; Graysville, Pennsylvania, U.S.
- Died: April 26, 1987 (aged 88); Washington, Pennsylvania, U.S.
- Education: The Kiski School

Playing career
- 1923: Washington & Jefferson
- 1925–1927: Washington & Jefferson
- Position: Fullback

Coaching career (HC unless noted)
- 1929–1931: Washington & Jefferson
- 1932–1936: Grove City
- 1937–1945: Washington HS (PA)

Head coaching record
- Overall: 34–24–8 (college)

Accomplishments and honors

Awards
- Second-team All-American (1926); Third-team All-American (1927); 2× First-team All-Eastern (1926, 1927); Second-team All-Eastern (1925)

William Enlow Amos (July 6, 1898 – April 26, 1987) was an American college football player and coach. He is considered to be one of the best college football players in Washington & Jefferson College history.

Amos was born in Graysville, Pennsylvania. He attended The Kiski School and was a veteran of World War I.

As a fullback for Washington & Jefferson for was named to the 1926 College Football All-America Team and the 1927 College Football All-America Team.

After graduation, he turned down an offer from Pete Henry to play for the New York Giants and a minor league baseball contract. He returned to coach the Washington & Jefferson College football team from 1929 to 1931, amassing a record of 17–8–3. During the 1929 football season, Amos shared the head coach title with Ray Ride, who resigned after the season citing it being impossible to operate under dual authority. From 1937 through 1946, he was a multi-sport coach at Washington High School. He was a driving force in the creation of PONY Baseball and Softball. He also volunteered at the Brownson House.

In 1932, Amos was seriously injured in an automobile collision, sustaining a fractured skull and broken left arm.

He married Dora Polan in 1928 and with her had three children. Amos died in 1987 at the age of 88. Dora died the following year.

== Head coaching record ==
=== College ===
Year	Team	Overall	Conference	Standing	Bowl/playoffs
Washington & Jefferson Presidents (Independent) (1929–1931)
1929	Washington & Jefferson	5–2–2			
1930	Washington & Jefferson	6–2–1			
1931	Washington & Jefferson	6–4			
Washington & Jefferson:		17–8–3			
Grove City Crimson (Tri-State Conference) (1932–1933)
1932	Grove City	3–5–1	2–3	4th	
1933	Grove City	6–1–1	4–1	2nd	
Grove City Crimson (Independent) (1934–1936)
1934	Grove City	5–1–1			
1935	Grove City	2–4–1			
1936	Grove City	1–5–1			
Grove City:		17–16–5	6–4		
Total:		34–24–8			
