= Frank Wickhorst =

American football player and coach (1905–1972)

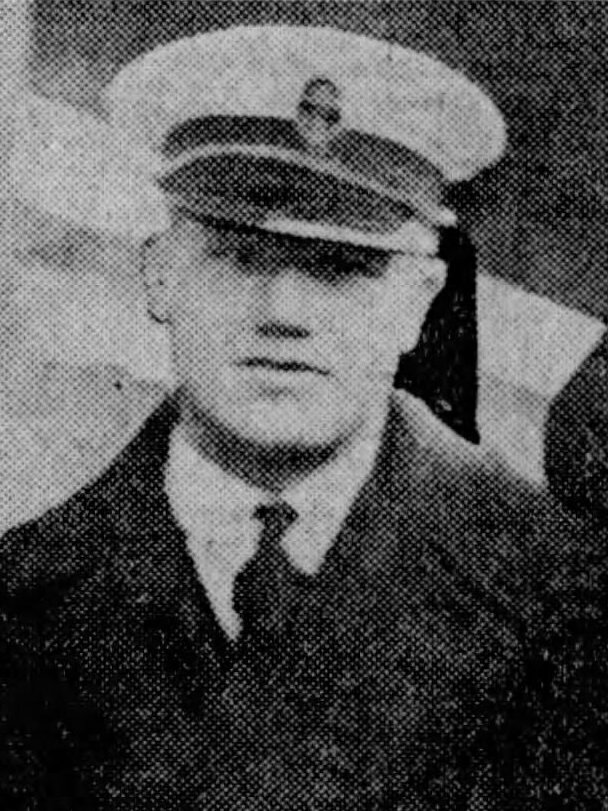
- Wickhorst in Chicago ahead of the 1926 Army–Navy Game at Soldier Field

Biographical details
- Born: March 18, 1906; Aurora, Illinois, U.S.
- Died: March 18, 1965 (aged 59); Oakland, California, U.S.

Playing career
- 1924–1926: Navy
- Position: Tackle

Coaching career (HC unless noted)
- 1931–1942: California (line)
- 1946: California

Head coaching record
- Overall: 2–7

Accomplishments and honors

Awards
- Unanimous All-American (1926); First-team All-Eastern (1926)
- College Football Hall of Fame; Inducted in 1970 (profile)

Frank Henry "Wick" Wickhorst (March 18, 1906 – April 1, 1965) was an American college football player and coach. He played football as a tackle at the United States Naval Academy and was selected as an All-American in 1926. Wickhorst served as the head football coach at the University of California, Berkeley in 1946, compiling a record of 2–7. He was inducted into the College Football Hall of Fame as a player in 1970.

== Early life ==
Wickhorst was born in Aurora, Illinois on March 18, 1906. He attended high school at East Aurora High School and Oak Park High School.

== United States Naval Academy ==
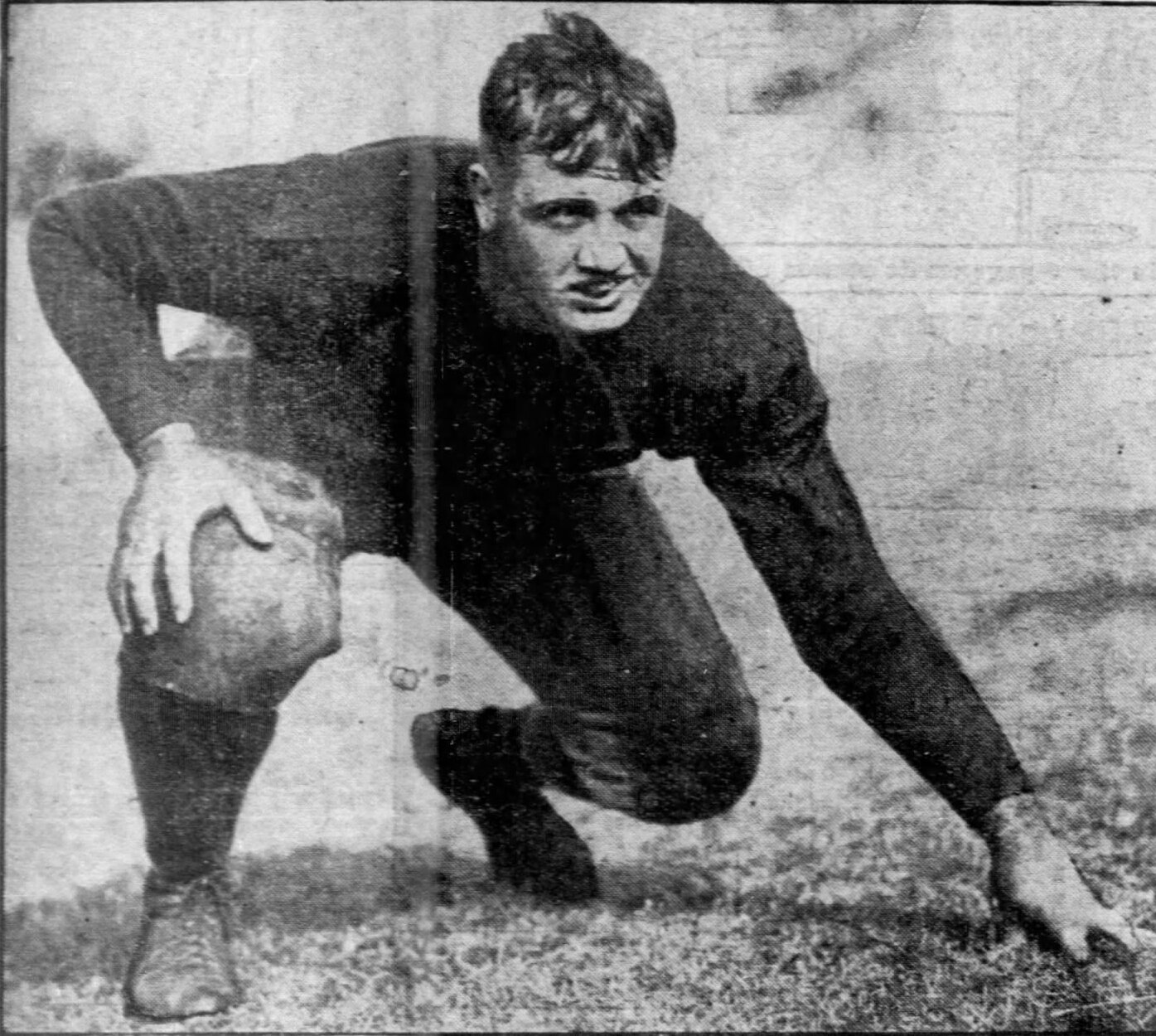
Wickhorst, circa 1926

Wickhorst, circa 1926

For his freshman year of college, Wickhorst had initially been set to attend the University of Illinois and play for the Illinois Fighting Illini football team. However, these plan changed after he was appointed to the United States Naval Academy. As a midshipman, he played on the Navy Midshipmen football team as a tackle. He was selected as an All-American in 1926. He was later inducted into the College Football Hall of Fame as a player in 1970.

As a player, Wickhorst is recorded to have measured 6 feet (1.8 m) in height and weighed 218 pounds (99 kg).

In November 1926, Notre Dame coach Knute Rockne opined on Saunders' playing style that he was, "the waiting type of tackle, but very effective in [his] own way." At the same time, The New York Times hailed him as one of the greatest tackles then-playing college football. In Bill Libby's 1973 book Champions of College Football, Wickhorst and Tom Hamilton are identified as having been the two most outstanding players of the 1926 Navy Midshipmen football team, which Libby considered to have been the season's champion team.

== Military career ==
Wickhorst had a distinguished career in the United States Navy. During World War II, he and his former teammate Hamilton again worked together to establish the Naval Pre- Flight Training Program. They also served together on the aboard the aircraft carrier USS Enterprise.

== Head coach at California ==
Wickhorst served as the head football coach at the University of California, Berkeley in 1946, compiling a record of 2–7.

=== Head coaching record ===
Year	Team	Overall	Conference	Standing	Bowl/playoffs
California Golden Bears (Pacific Coast Conference) (1946)
1946	California	2–7	1–6	9th	
California:		2–7	1–6		
Total:		2–7			

== Business career ==
Wickhorst worked as an executive of the Henry J. Kaiser Company.

== Death ==
Wickhorst died on April 1, 1965, while in Oakland, California.
