= Charles Rogers (American football coach) =

American football player and coach (1902–1986)

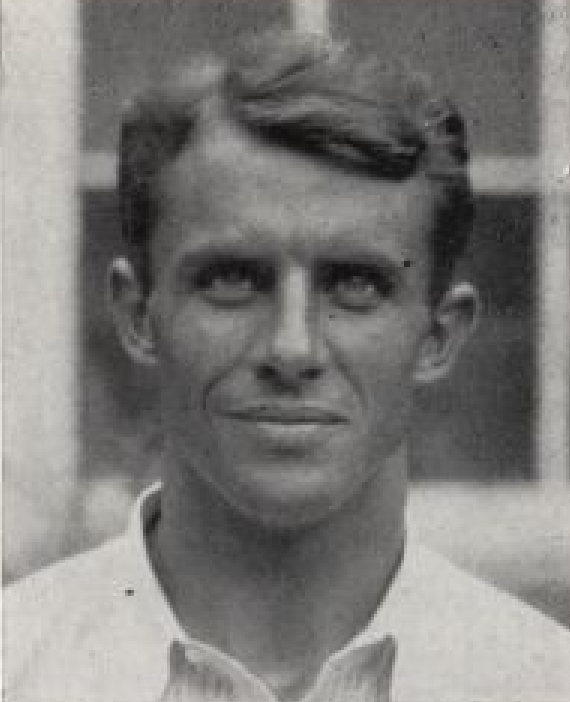
- Rogers pictured in The Blue Hen 1933, Delaware yearbook

Biographical details
- Born: January 15, 1902; Camden, New Jersey, U.S.
- Died: June 26, 1986 (aged 84)

Playing career
- 1923–1926: Penn
- 1927–1929: Frankford Yellow Jackets
- Positions: Wingback, halfback

Coaching career (HC unless noted)
- 1927: Frankford Yellow Jackets
- 1931–1933: Delaware

Head coaching record
- Overall: 12–9–4 (college)

Accomplishments and honors

Awards
- First-team All-American (1926); First-team All-Eastern (1926)

Charles Stagg Rogers (January 15, 1902 – June 26, 1986) was an American football player and coach. He played college football at the University of Pennsylvania and was selected to the 1926 College Football All-America Team. After graduation, he played in the National Football League (NFL) for the Frankford Yellow Jackets from 1927 to 1929. He served the team as a player-coach during their 1927 season. Rogers served as the head football coach at the University of Delaware from 1931 to 1933, comping a record of 12–9–4.

== Head coaching record ==
=== College ===
Year	Team	Overall	Conference	Standing	Bowl/playoffs
Delaware Fightin' Blue Hens (Independent) (1931–1933)
1931	Delaware	5–1–2			
1932	Delaware	5–4			
1933	Delaware	2–4–2			
Delaware:		12–9–4			
Total:		12–9–4			
