= Frank Mayer =

American football player (1902–1960)

No. 19
- Positions: Guard, tackle

Personal information
- Born: June 18, 1902; Glencoe, Minnesota, U.S.
- Died: March 24, 1960 (aged 57); Ramsey County, Minnesota, U.S.
- Listed height: 5 ft 11 in (1.80 m)
- Listed weight: 215 lb (98 kg)

Career information
- College: Notre Dame

Career history
- Green Bay Packers (1927)

Awards and highlights
- Third-team All-American (1926)
- Stats at Pro Football Reference

Frank George Mayer (June 18, 1902 – March 24, 1960) was an American football player. He played professionally as a guard and tackle for one season, in 1927, for the Green Bay Packers of the National Football League (NFL).

In 1928, Mayer was appointed as an assistant coach at the College of St. Thomas—now known as University of St. Thomas—in Minnesota. He died on March 24, 1960.
