= Bud Boeringer =

American football player (1903–1980)

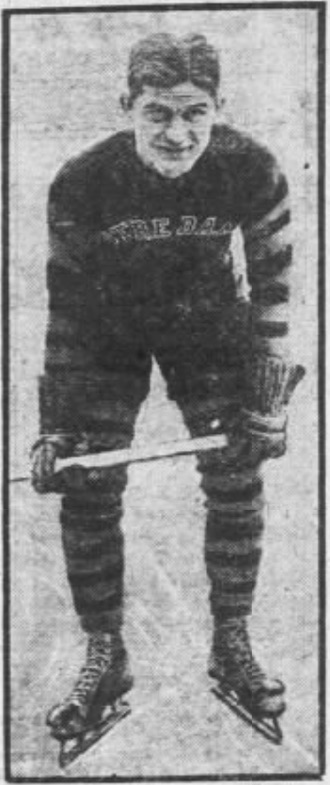
- Boeringer in ice hockey gear while at Notre Dame

Profile
- Position: Center

Personal information
- Born: November 13, 1903; Saint Paul, Minnesota, U.S.
- Died: February 11, 1980 (aged 76); Park Rapids, Minnesota, U.S.
- Listed height: 6 ft 1 in (1.85 m)
- Listed weight: 186 lb (84 kg)

Career information
- College: University of Notre Dame

Career history
- 1925–1926: Notre Dame

Awards and highlights
- Consensus All-American (1926)

Arthur Benjamin "Bud" Boeringer (November 13, 1903 – February 11, 1980) was an American football center at the University of Notre Dame. Minnesota native Boeringer was a consensus All-American in 1926. After college, he coached both football and hockey at the collegiate level including being a head coach of the University of Detroit and Cornell University ice hockey teams.

== Playing career ==
Boeringer played for the Notre Dame Fighting Irish football team at the University Notre Dame under coach Knute Rockne during the 1925 and 1926 seasons. In 1926, as a 6-foot, 1-inch, 189-pound center, he was recognized as a consensus first-team All-American, having received first-team honors from several publications and organizations including the Associated Press (AP), and Collier's Weekly (Grantland Rice). In 1928 after Boeringer left Notre Dame, he became entangled in a war of words between his coach Knute Rockne and University of Michigan coach Fielding Yost over player eligibility. Yost claimed that Boeringer played several seasons of football at St. Thomas College in Minnesota before coming to Notre Dame.

While at Notre Dame Boeringer also played on the varsity hockey team. He played defenseman for 17 games on the varsity squad from 1924 to 1927.

== After college ==
After leaving Notre Dame he became an assistant football coach at the University of Detroit under former Notre Dame standout Gus Dorais. While at Detroit he also served as head hockey coach. After 16 years at Detroit he moved to become assistant football coach at the University of Iowa under Clem Crowe. He later moved onto Cornell University to become an assistant football coach. In 1947, Boeringer replaced Nick Bawlf as Cornell head ice hockey coach after Bawlf became sick and unable to coach. His team was made up of mostly sophomores and was disadvantaged by having to practice and play their games outdoors. They canceled their first game against Colgate due to mild weather that made practice on condition of Dwyer's Dam Rink on Beebe Lake impractical. After a cold spell just before their first home game against United States Military Academy, the ice on Beebe Lake became fit for playing. The lack of practice showed with Cornell losing by a score of 9 goals to 0. He coached the rest of the season with his team going 0–4. After the season Cornell dropped varsity hockey for 10 years citing several mild winters making practice on Beebe Lake difficult and unable to compete with cold-weather schools and schools with indoor rinks.

== Head coaching record ==
Record table
Season	Team	Overall	Conference	Standing	Postseason
Cornell Big Red Independent (1947–1948)
1947–48	Cornell	0–4–0			
Cornell:		0–4–0			
Total:		0–4–0			
