= Harry Connaughton =

American football player (1905–1969)

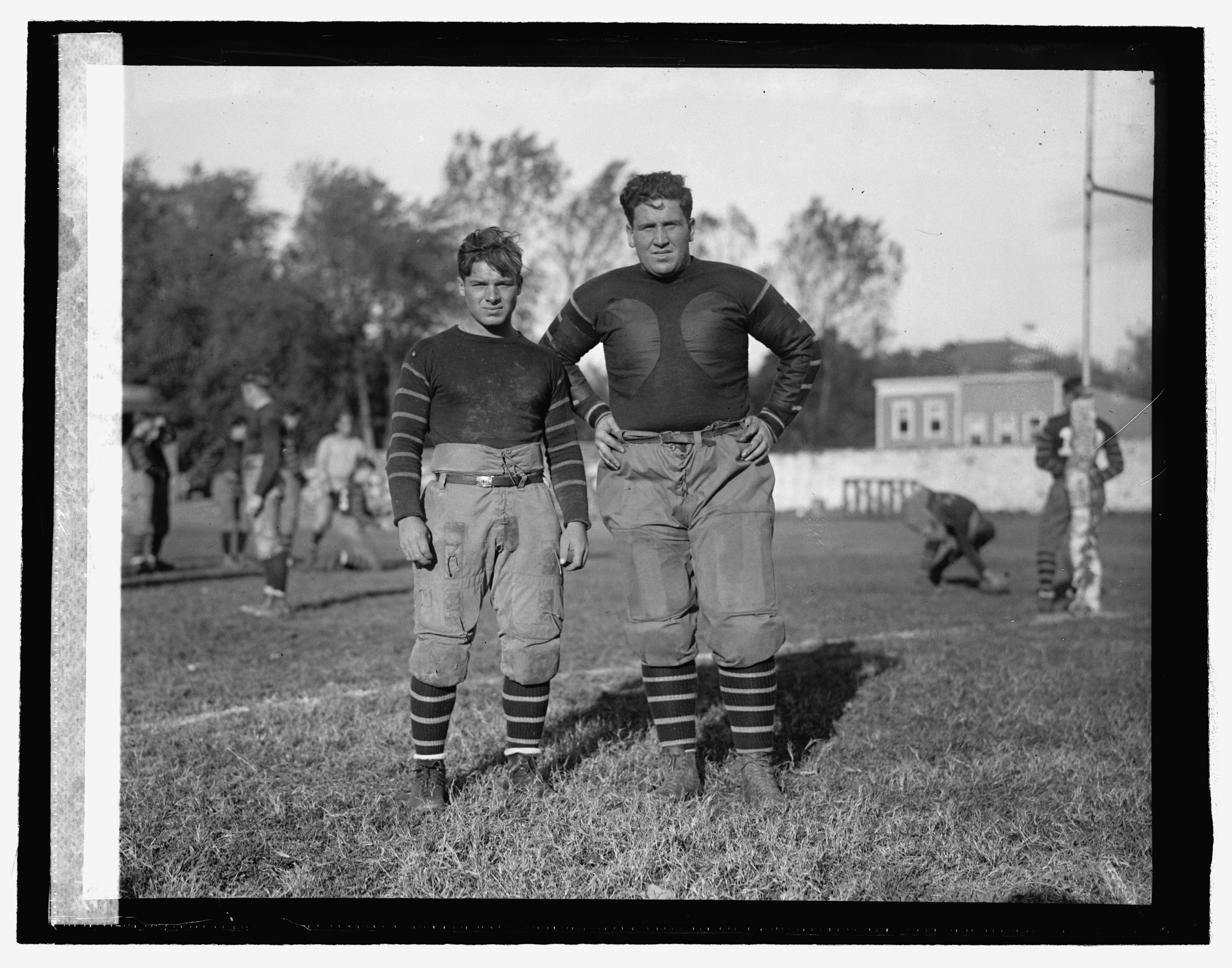

Profile
- Position: Center

Personal information
- Born: June 6, 1905; Philadelphia, Pennsylvania, U.S.
- Died: August 11, 1969 (age 64); Braham, Minnesota, U.S.

Career information
- High school: Saint Joseph's Preparatory School
- College: Georgetown

Career history
- 1925–1926: Georgetown
- 1927: Frankford Yellow Jackets

Awards and highlights
- Consensus All-American (1926); First-team All-Eastern (1926)

Harry Aloysius "Babe" Connaughton (June 6, 1905 – August 11, 1969) was an American football player. He played college football for the Georgetown Hoyas and professional football for the Frankford Yellow Jackets. He was a consensus All-American in 1926.

Connaughton was born in Philadelphia in 1905 and attended Saint Joseph's Preparatory School in that city. He enrolled at Georgetown University and, while there, played at the guard position on the Georgetown Hoyas football team in 1925 and 1926. He was a consensus selection for the 1926 College Football All-America Team. At 6 feet 4 inches (1.93 m) and 250 pounds (110 kg), he was a large player for his era. He played for Hoyas teams that compiled a 16-3-1 in 1925 and 1926. In December 1926, he was awarded the Veterans Cup as the most valuable player in eastern football. He was inducted into the Georgetown University Athletic Hall of Fame in 1953.

Connaughton also played professional football for the Frankford Yellow Jackets during the 1927 NFL season. He started 16 games at the guard position for the 1927 Yellow Jackets.

In 1938, he became the assistant to Michael Igoe, the United States Attorney in Chicago. By June 1938, his weight had dropped to 180 pounds (82 kg) from 260 pounds (120 kg) while playing football at Georgetown.

Connaughton died in 1969 at age 64 in Braham, Minnesota.
