= George Wilson (American football halfback) =

American football player (1905–1990)

Profile
- Position: HB

Personal information
- Born: July 18, 1905; Glenside, Pennsylvania, U.S.
- Died: May 3, 1990 (aged 84); Bryn Mawr, Pennsylvania, U.S.

Career information
- College: Lafayette College

Awards and highlights
- Third-team All-American (1926)
- Stats at Pro Football Reference
- College Football Hall of Fame

George Bowman Wilson Jr. (July 18, 1905 – May 3, 1990) was an American football player who played at Lafayette College. He was elected to the College Football Hall of Fame in 1988.

During the Second World War, he joined the United States Marine Corps, eventually achieving the rank of brigadier general and receiving honors including the Legion of Merit.
