= Frank Kirkleski =

American football player (1904–1980)

No. 1, 32, 29
- Position: Halfback

Personal information
- Born: May 19, 1904; Nutley, New Jersey, U.S.
- Died: May 6, 1980 (aged 75); Point Pleasant, New Jersey, U.S.
- Listed height: 5 ft 11 in (1.80 m)
- Listed weight: 179 lb (81 kg)

Career information
- College: Lafayette

Career history

Playing
- Pottsville Maroons (1927); Orange Athletic Club (1928); Orange Tornadoes (1929); Newark Tornadoes (1930); Brooklyn Dodgers (1931)

Coaching
- Passaic Red Devils (1932–1933) Head coach; Wessington Red Devils (1936) Head coach; Paterson Panthers (1937–1939) Head coach; Hutchinson NAS (1945) Backfield coach

Awards and highlights
- Third-team All-American (1926); First-team All-Eastern (1926); Second-team All-Eastern (1925); Lafayette Maroon Club Hall Of Fame (2001); Nutley High School Athletic Hall of Fame (2008)
- Stats at Pro Football Reference

Frank William Kirkleski (May 19, 1904 – May 6, 1980) was an American football player and educator. He played during the early years of the National Football League (NFL) for the Pottsville Maroons, Orange/Newark Tornadoes, and Brooklyn Dodgers. Kirkleski played college football at Lafayette College, in which he graduated from in 1927.

== College playing career ==
While at Lafayette, Kirkleski was known as a hard-hitting back. He played all four of his college years as a varsity halfback. During his freshman season, he shocked Lafayette's archrival, Lehigh University, with a touchdown run that gave the Leopards a 13–3 last-minute victory in 1923. Lehigh only scored three points in Kirkleski's four years at Lafayette. In his sophomore year, he helped guide Lafayette to a 7–2 record. He was named the team's captain during his senior year. It was then that he helped the Leopards capture their third national championship with a 9–0 record. He received second and third-team All-American honors from the New York Telegraph and The New York World in 1926. He was later inducted into the school's Maroon Club Hall Of Fame in 2001.

== Professional playing career ==
=== Pottsville Maroons ===
After college, Kirkleski played for the Pottsville Maroons of the National Football League (NFL). In his professional debut, Kirkleski threw two touchdown passes to lead the Maroons over the Buffalo Bisons, 22–0. Then on October 16, 1927, he led his team down the field on three passes, where he recovered a fumble, by teammate Tony Latone, in the endzone to give the Maroons a last minute win over the Providence Steam Roller. Kirkleski would haunt Providence again in a rematch on November 24. In that game, he threw a 21-yard pass to Gus Kenneally to give Pottsville a 6–0 victory.

=== Orange Athletic Club ===
In 1928, Kirkleski joined the independent Orange Athletic Club from New Jersey. During a game against the NFL's Staten Island Stapletons, he threw for a touchdown and combined, with another quarterback, to throw for 143 yards on 23 passes without an interception, which was an accomplishment in 1928. However Kirkleski gave up a costly interception, in the team's finale against the Stapletons, which was returned for a Staten Island touchdown. That error resulted in a 6—0 Orange loss.

=== Orange–Newark Tornadoes ===
In 1929, Kirkleski joined the Orange Tornadoes and had one rushing touchdown and one receiving touchdown that season. When the team was renamed the Newark Tornadoes in 1930, Kirkleski rushed for one touchdown.

=== Brooklyn Dodgers ===
Kirkleski's final year in professional football, in 1931, was spent with the Brooklyn Dodgers. He only played three games that season and did not register a score for that season.

== Coaching and teaching career ==
Kirkleski served as an officer in the United States Navy during World War II. He was the backfield coach for the 1945 Hutchinson Naval Air Station Gobs football team.

Kirkleski coach football and baseball at Nutley High School and Woodbridge High School in New Jersey. He was the vice principal at Jefferson High School and principal at Grover Cleveland Junior High School before retiring in 1968.

== Death ==
Kirkleski died on May 6, 1980, at Point Pleasant Hospital in Point Pleasant, New Jersey.
