= Graysville, Pennsylvania =

Unincorporated community in Pennsylvania, US

- Unincorporated community
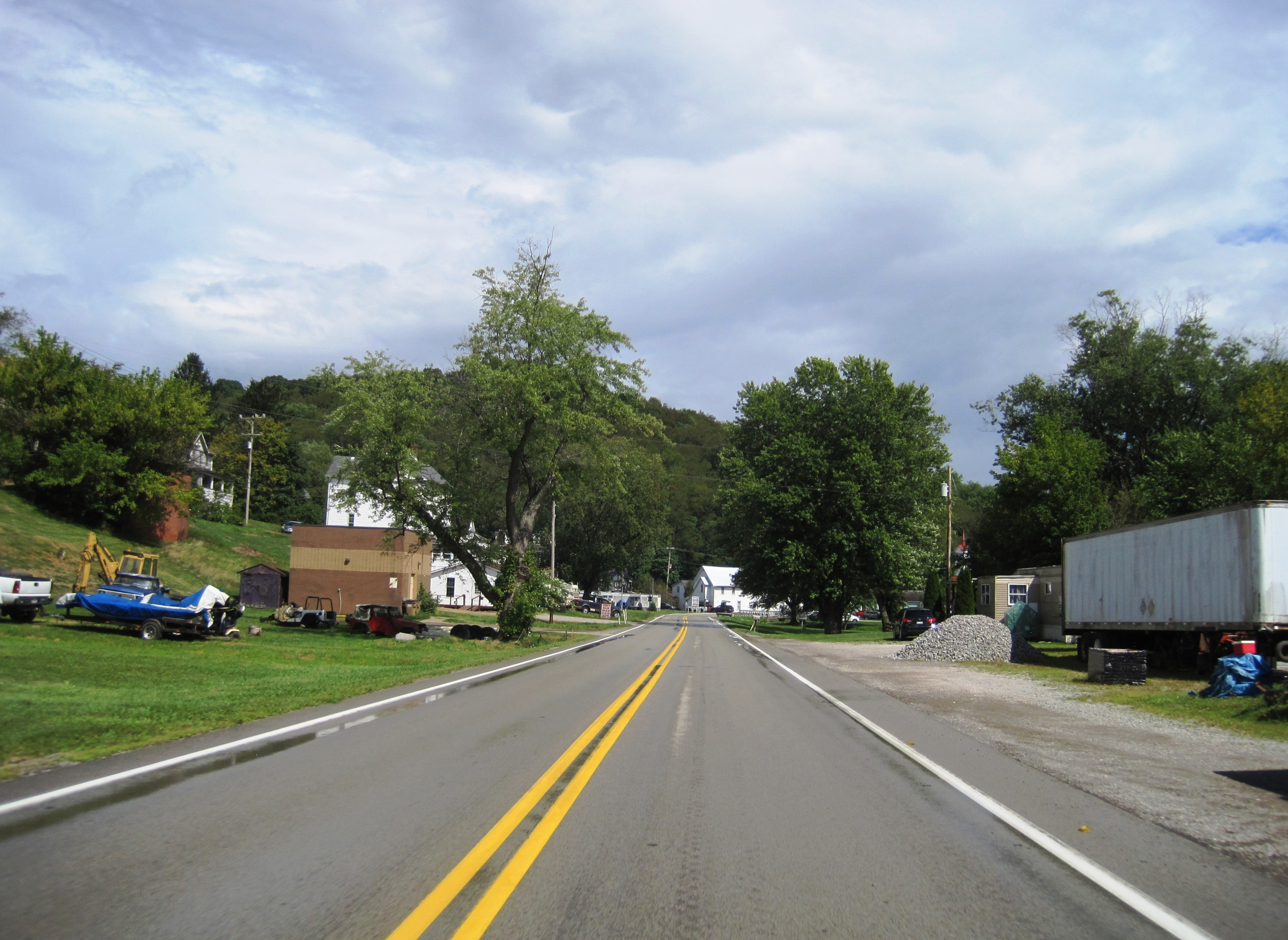
- PA 21 eastbound in Graysville

- Location within Pennsylvania
- Coordinates: 39°55′55″N 80°23′05″W
- Country: United States
- State: Pennsylvania
- County: Greene
- Elevation: 1,148 ft (350 m)
- Time zone: UTC-5 (Eastern (EST))
  - Summer (DST): UTC-4 (EDT)
- ZIP code: 15337
- Area codes: 724, 878
- GNIS feature ID: 1176035

Graysville is an unincorporated community in Gray Township in Greene County, Pennsylvania, United States. The community is located along Pennsylvania Route 21, 11.2 miles (18.0 km) west-northwest of Waynesburg. Graysville has a post office with ZIP code 15337.
