= Ralph Furey =

Biographical details
- Born: June 16, 1903; New York, New York, U.S.
- Died: November 14, 1984 (aged 81); Durango, Colorado, U.S.

Playing career

Football
- 1925–1927: Columbia

Coaching career (HC unless noted)

Football
- ?: Columbia (assistant)

Administrative career (AD unless noted)
- 1943–1968: Columbia

Ralph J. Furey (June 16, 1903 – November 14, 1984) was an American college athlete, football coach, and college athletics administrator. He served as the athletic director at Columbia University from 1943 to 1968. Furey was born in New York City on June 16, 1903. He attended Brooklyn Preparatory School, before playing football and baseball at Columbia. Furey was the captain of the Columbia's football team in 1927.
