= Lloyd Yoder =

American football player (1903–1967)

Profile
- Position: Tackle

Personal information
- Born: July 13, 1903; Salem, Ohio, U.S.
- Died: November 30, 1967 (aged 64); San Francisco, California, U.S.

Career information
- College: Carnegie Tech (1923-1926)

Awards and highlights
- First-team All-American (1926)
- College Football Hall of Fame (Class of 1982)

Lloyd E. Yoder (July 13, 1903 – November 30, 1967), nicknamed The Plaid Bull, was an American football player. He played collegiately at Carnegie Tech, and was elected to the College Football Hall of Fame in 1982.

Yoder was a 1921 graduate of Salem High School in Salem, Ohio. He lettered four years as a tackle at Carnegie Tech, captaining the team and earning a spot on the 1926 College Football All-America Team.

In the 1926 season, Yoder was part of a Carnegie Tech team that defeated the otherwise-unbeaten Notre Dame Fighting Irish, 19–0. He played in the East–West Shrine Game after both the 1926 and 1927 seasons: captaining the East team in 1926 and the West team in 1927.

In 1927, Yoder played for the San Francisco-based Olympic Club.

After college, Yoder worked for the National Broadcasting Company for 40 years, managing stations in Chicago, Cleveland, Denver and San Francisco. He also served in World War II as a lieutenant commander in the United States Navy.

He died in San Francisco in 1967 at the age of 64.
