= 1929 Buffalo Bisons football team =

American college football season

1929 Buffalo Bisons football
- Conference: Independent
- Record: 5–2
- Head coach: Jay L. Lee (1st season)
- Captain: Gene North
- Home stadium: Rotary Field

1929 Eastern college football independents records
| | Conf. | | | Overall |
| Team | W | L | T | W | | L | | T |
|---|---|---|---|---|---|---|---|---|
| No. 3 Pittsburgh | | – | | 9 | – | 1 | – | 0 |
| Colgate | | – | | 8 | – | 1 | – | 0 |
| Fordham | | – | | 7 | – | 0 | – | 2 |
| Bucknell | | – | | 8 | – | 2 | – | 0 |
| No. 11 Penn | | – | | 7 | – | 2 | – | 0 |
| Boston College | | – | | 7 | – | 2 | – | 1 |
| Villanova | | – | | 7 | – | 2 | – | 1 |
| Cornell | | – | | 6 | – | 2 | – | 0 |
| Tufts | | – | | 5 | – | 1 | – | 2 |
| Harvard | | – | | 5 | – | 2 | – | 1 |
| Yale | | – | | 5 | – | 2 | – | 1 |
| NYU | | – | | 7 | – | 3 | – | 0 |
| Franklin & Marshall | | – | | 6 | – | 3 | – | 0 |
| Penn State | | – | | 6 | – | 3 | – | 0 |
| Syracuse | | – | | 6 | – | 3 | – | 0 |
| Washington & Jefferson | | – | | 5 | – | 2 | – | 2 |
| Drexel | | – | | 6 | – | 3 | – | 1 |
| Temple | | – | | 6 | – | 3 | – | 1 |
| Carnegie Tech | | – | | 5 | – | 3 | – | 1 |
| Army | | – | | 6 | – | 4 | – | 1 |
| Providence | | – | | 3 | – | 3 | – | 2 |
| Brown | | – | | 5 | – | 5 | – | 0 |
| Columbia | | – | | 4 | – | 5 | – | 0 |
| CCNY | | – | | 2 | – | 4 | – | 2 |
| Princeton | | – | | 2 | – | 4 | – | 1 |
| Boston University | | – | | 3 | – | 6 | – | 0 |
| Vermont | | – | | 2 | – | 7 | – | 0 |
Rankings from Dickinson System

The 1929 Buffalo Bisons football team was an American football team that represented the University at Buffalo as an independent during the 1929 college football season. In its first season under head coach Jay L. Lee, the team compiled a 5–2 record. The team played its home games at Rotary Field in Buffalo, New York.

== Schedule ==
| Date | Opponent | Site | Result | Attendance | Source |
|---|---|---|---|---|---|
| October 5 | at Upsala | East Orange, NJ | L 7–13 | | |
| October 12 | Alfred | Rotary Field; Buffalo, NY | W 20–12 | | |
| October 19 | Clarkson Tech | Rotary Field; Buffalo, NY | W 12–9 | | |
| October 26 | Rochester | Rotary Field; Buffalo, NY | L 0–20 | | |
| November 2 | at Long Island | Hawthorne Field; Brooklyn, NY | W 13–0 | | |
| November 9 | Hiram | Rotary Field; Buffalo, NY | W 27–12 | | |
| November 16 | at Hobart | Geneva, NY | W 13–7 | | |
