= 1929 Dartmouth Indians football team =

American college football season

1929 Dartmouth Indians football
- Conference: Independent
- Record: 7–2
- Head coach: Jackson Cannell (3rd season)
- Captain: Ellsworth Armstrong
- Home stadium: Memorial Field

1929 Eastern college football independents records
| | Conf. | | | Overall |
| Team | W | L | T | W | | L | | T |
|---|---|---|---|---|---|---|---|---|
| No. 3 Pittsburgh | | – | | 9 | – | 1 | – | 0 |
| Colgate | | – | | 8 | – | 1 | – | 0 |
| Fordham | | – | | 7 | – | 0 | – | 2 |
| Bucknell | | – | | 8 | – | 2 | – | 0 |
| No. 11 Penn | | – | | 7 | – | 2 | – | 0 |
| Boston College | | – | | 7 | – | 2 | – | 1 |
| Villanova | | – | | 7 | – | 2 | – | 1 |
| Cornell | | – | | 6 | – | 2 | – | 0 |
| Tufts | | – | | 5 | – | 1 | – | 2 |
| Harvard | | – | | 5 | – | 2 | – | 1 |
| Yale | | – | | 5 | – | 2 | – | 1 |
| NYU | | – | | 7 | – | 3 | – | 0 |
| Franklin & Marshall | | – | | 6 | – | 3 | – | 0 |
| Penn State | | – | | 6 | – | 3 | – | 0 |
| Syracuse | | – | | 6 | – | 3 | – | 0 |
| Washington & Jefferson | | – | | 5 | – | 2 | – | 2 |
| Drexel | | – | | 6 | – | 3 | – | 1 |
| Temple | | – | | 6 | – | 3 | – | 1 |
| Carnegie Tech | | – | | 5 | – | 3 | – | 1 |
| Army | | – | | 6 | – | 4 | – | 1 |
| Providence | | – | | 3 | – | 3 | – | 2 |
| Brown | | – | | 5 | – | 5 | – | 0 |
| Columbia | | – | | 4 | – | 5 | – | 0 |
| CCNY | | – | | 2 | – | 4 | – | 2 |
| Princeton | | – | | 2 | – | 4 | – | 1 |
| Boston University | | – | | 3 | – | 6 | – | 0 |
| Vermont | | – | | 2 | – | 7 | – | 0 |
Rankings from Dickinson System

The 1929 Dartmouth Indians football team was an American football team that represented Dartmouth College as an independent during the 1929 college football season. In their third season under head coach Jackson Cannell, the Indians compiled a 7–2 record. Ellsworth Armstrong was the team captain.

Al Marsters was the team's leading scorer, with 109 points, from 16 touchdowns and 13 kicked extra points.

Dartmouth played its home games at Memorial Field on the college campus in Hanover, New Hampshire.

== Schedule ==
| Date | Opponent | Site | Result | Attendance | Source |
|---|---|---|---|---|---|
| September 28 | Norwich | Memorial Field; Hanover, NH | W 67–0 | | |
| October 5 | Hobart | Memorial Field; Hanover, NH | W 68–0 | | |
| October 12 | Allegheny | Memorial Field; Hanover, NH | W 53–0 | | |
| October 19 | at Columbia | Baker Field; New York, NY | W 34–0 | 40,000 | |
| October 26 | at Harvard | Harvard Stadium; Boston, MA (rivalry) | W 34–7 | 60,000 | |
| November 2 | at Yale | Yale Bowl; New Haven, CT | L 12–16 | 78,000 | |
| November 9 | at Brown | Brown Stadium; Providence, RI | W 13–6 | 20,000 | |
| November 16 | Cornell | Memorial Field; Hanover, NH (rivalry) | W 18–14 | 14,000 | |
| November 30 | vs. Navy | Franklin Field; Philadelphia, PA | L 6–13 | 35,000 | |
