= 1929 Holy Cross Crusaders football team =

American college football season

1929 Holy Cross Crusaders football
- Conference: Independent
- Record: 6–4
- Head coach: Cleo A. O'Donnell (11th season)
- Captain: Stuart J. Clancy
- Home stadium: Fitton Field

1929 Eastern college football independents records
| | Conf. | | | Overall |
| Team | W | L | T | W | | L | | T |
|---|---|---|---|---|---|---|---|---|
| No. 3 Pittsburgh | | – | | 9 | – | 1 | – | 0 |
| Colgate | | – | | 8 | – | 1 | – | 0 |
| Fordham | | – | | 7 | – | 0 | – | 2 |
| Bucknell | | – | | 8 | – | 2 | – | 0 |
| No. 11 Penn | | – | | 7 | – | 2 | – | 0 |
| Boston College | | – | | 7 | – | 2 | – | 1 |
| Villanova | | – | | 7 | – | 2 | – | 1 |
| Cornell | | – | | 6 | – | 2 | – | 0 |
| Tufts | | – | | 5 | – | 1 | – | 2 |
| Harvard | | – | | 5 | – | 2 | – | 1 |
| Yale | | – | | 5 | – | 2 | – | 1 |
| NYU | | – | | 7 | – | 3 | – | 0 |
| Franklin & Marshall | | – | | 6 | – | 3 | – | 0 |
| Penn State | | – | | 6 | – | 3 | – | 0 |
| Syracuse | | – | | 6 | – | 3 | – | 0 |
| Washington & Jefferson | | – | | 5 | – | 2 | – | 2 |
| Drexel | | – | | 6 | – | 3 | – | 1 |
| Temple | | – | | 6 | – | 3 | – | 1 |
| Carnegie Tech | | – | | 5 | – | 3 | – | 1 |
| Army | | – | | 6 | – | 4 | – | 1 |
| Providence | | – | | 3 | – | 3 | – | 2 |
| Brown | | – | | 5 | – | 5 | – | 0 |
| Columbia | | – | | 4 | – | 5 | – | 0 |
| CCNY | | – | | 2 | – | 4 | – | 2 |
| Princeton | | – | | 2 | – | 4 | – | 1 |
| Boston University | | – | | 3 | – | 6 | – | 0 |
| Vermont | | – | | 2 | – | 7 | – | 0 |
Rankings from Dickinson System

The 1929 Holy Cross Crusaders football team was an American football team that represented the College of the Holy Cross as an independent during the 1929 college football season. In its 11th season under head coach Cleo A. O'Donnell, the team compiled a 6–4 record. The team played its home games at Fitton Field in Worcester, Massachusetts.

== Schedule ==
| Date | Time | Opponent | Site | Result | Attendance | Source |
|---|---|---|---|---|---|---|
| September 28 | | St. John's | Fitton Field; Worcester, MA | W 19–0 | | |
| October 5 | | Providence | Fitton Field; Worcester, MA | W 14–6 | 8,000 | |
| October 12 | | Rutgers | Fitton Field; Worcester, MA | W 20–3 | | |
| October 19 | | at Fordham | Polo Grounds; New York, NY (rivalry) | L 0–7 | | |
| October 26 | | Marquette | Fitton Field; Worcester, MA | W 14–6 | 8,000 | |
| November 2 | | Brown | Fitton Field; Worcester, MA | L 14–15 | | |
| November 9 | | Boston University | Fitton Field; Worcester, MA | W 44–12 | | |
| November 16 | | at Harvard | Harvard Stadium; Boston, MA | L 6–12 | | |
| November 23 | | Springfield | Fitton Field; Worcester, MA | W 23–6 | | |
| November 30 | 1:45 p.m. | at Boston College | Fenway Park; Boston, MA (rivalry) | L 0–12 | 35,000 | |
