= Jackson Cannell =

American football player and coach (1896–1965)

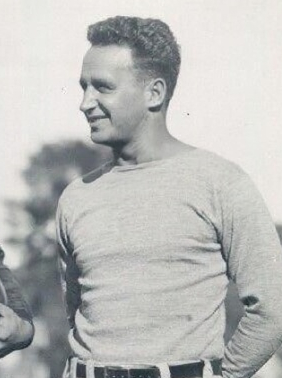
- Cannell in 1932

Biographical details
- Born: May 30, 1896; Everett, Massachusetts, U.S.
- Died: March 21, 1965 (aged 68); Kittery, Maine, U.S.

Playing career
- 1916, 1919: Dartmouth
- Position: Quarterback

Coaching career (HC unless noted)
- 1920: Dartmouth (assistant)
- 1921–1922: Dartmouth
- 1923–1928: Dartmouth (backfield)
- 1929–1933: Dartmouth
- 1937–1940: Saint Anselm (assistant)
- 1941–1956: Traip Academy

Head coaching record
- Overall: 39–19–4 (college); 80–25–7 (high school)

Jackson Livingston Cannell (May 30, 1896 – March 21, 1965) was an American college football player and coach. He served as the head coach at Dartmouth for seven non-consecutive years, from 1921 to 1922 and 1929 to 1933. His Dartmouth teams amassed a 39–19–4 record.

== Early life ==
Cannell attended Everett High School in Everett, Massachusetts. While there, he played as a quarterback on the football team. He was a part of the 1914 Everett team that went 13–0 and outscored opponents 600 to 0, which he led to a mythical interscholastic championship. Cannell then attended Dartmouth College, from which he graduated in 1920. He played on the football team and earned varsity letters in 1916 and 1919, the latter of which he served as a captain.

== Coaching career ==
In 1921, Cannell became Dartmouth's head football coach, replacing Clarence Spears. In his first season, Dartmouth posted a 6–2–1 record. After the season, Cannell's players petitioned for his return as head coach after they learned alumni were agitating to have him replaced by former Dartmouth star and Colgate coach Lawrence Bankart. The administration vehemently denied that Bankart was to replace Cannell, and The New York Times wrote the "Bankart rumor springs up every year, but usually with little or no foundation." Bankart had previously declined the position vacated by Spears, and had recommended Cannell for the job.

In 1922, Dartmouth posted a 6–3 record. Cannell was replaced by Jesse Hawley, but remained at Dartmouth as an assistant backfield coach under Hawley. Cannell was promoted back to head coach in 1929 after Hawley relinquished the job due to "business pressure". During the next three years Dartmouth amassed a 19–6–2 record, but posted an 8–8–1 mark over Cannell's last two seasons.

On November 24, 1933, before the season finale, The Lewiston Daily Sun reported that Cannell was "through as head coach of the Dartmouth varsity eleven." Five days later, Cannell resigned his position with a year remaining on his contract. Athletic director Harry R. Heneage stated the administration had not pressured him for his resignation, but without further elaboration. The school's student newspaper wrote, "Dartmouth could not play confident football again next year under Cannell with morale that has been weakened by the anvil chorus of criticism." He was replaced by Army assistant Earl Blaik, selected from an original field of more than 100 candidates, which included Ossie Solem and Gus Dorais.

In 1937, Cannell was hired as an assistant under his former high school coach, Cleo O'Donnell, at Saint Anselm College in Goffstown, New Hampshire. He remained at the school until it dropped football following the 1940 season.

From 1941 to 1956, Cannell was the head football coach at the Robert William Traip Academy in Kittery, Maine, where he amassed an 80–25–7 record. From 1942 to 1946, Traip had the longest undefeated streak in state history.

== Later life ==
On March 21, 1965, Cannell was found dead in his home in Kittery by one of his daughters. He was survived by three daughters and predeceased by his wife, who died in 1953, and a son, Jackson Jr., who was killed in World War II.

== Head coaching record ==
Year	Team	Overall	Conference	Standing	Bowl/playoffs
Dartmouth Indians (Independent) (1921–1922)
1921	Dartmouth	6–2–1			
1922	Dartmouth	6–3			
Dartmouth Indians (Independent) (1929–1933)
1929	Dartmouth	7–2			
1930	Dartmouth	7–1–1			
1931	Dartmouth	5–3–1			
1932	Dartmouth	4–4			
1933	Dartmouth	4–4–1			
Dartmouth:		39–19–4			
Total:		39–19–4			
