= George Floyd protests in Maine =

2020 civil unrest after the murder of George Floyd

- Part of George Floyd protests
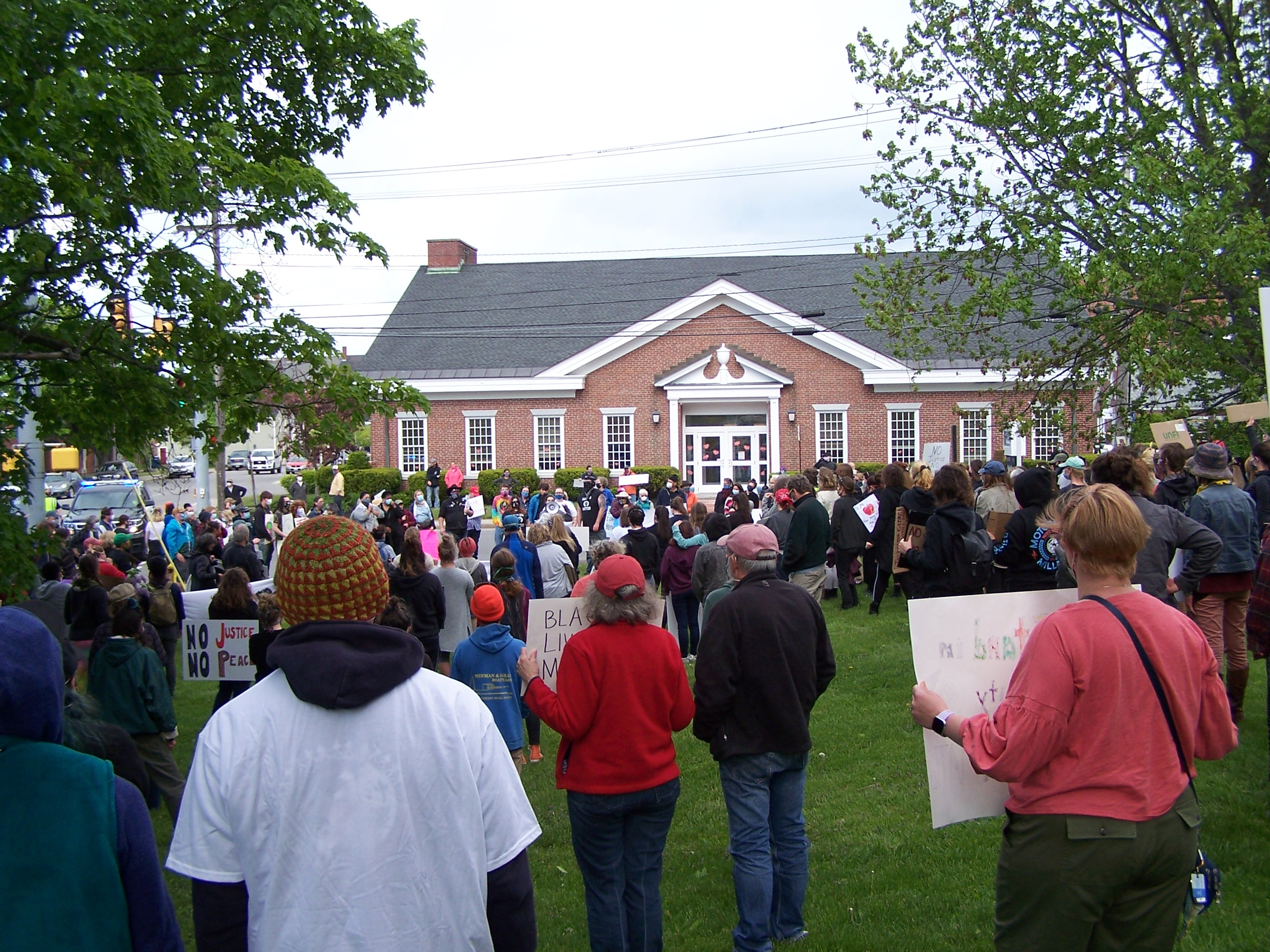
- Protest in Rockland, Maine on June 1
- Date: May 26, 2020 – early 2021
- Location: Maine, United States
- Caused by: Police brutality; Institutional racism against African Americans; Reaction to the murder of George Floyd; Economic, racial and social inequality

This is a list of George Floyd protests in the U.S. state of Maine.

Cities in Maine in which a protest with about 100 or more participants was held

== Locations ==
=== Augusta ===
June 7: Over 1,000 protesters marched around Capitol Park and the Augusta Police Department. They also lay down in front of the state house for nine minutes in memory of George Floyd.

=== Bangor ===
- May 31: A group gathered at the University of Maine to promote a message of racial equality.
- June 1: Hundreds gathered at the Bangor Public Library and Pierce Park. Harlow Street was closed so the crowd could listen to speakers.

=== Bath ===
June 11: 20-30 people peacefully protested by an intersection in Bath. A man in a pickup truck disturbed the peace by driving slowly through the small crowd, resulting in the protesters reporting the occurrence to the police as a hit-and-run.

=== Belfast ===
May 31: Around 200 people gathered at Post Office Square, protesters peacefully gathered. A man tried to drive his car into the group of protesters, however there were no injuries reported.

=== Bethel ===
June 9: Over 350 protesters held a peaceful demonstration in Bethel. The gathered mass marched from the town common to Cafe DiCocoa's, where they kneeled for 8 minutes and 46 seconds, in accordance with the amount of time that George Floyd was suffocated by Minneapolis police officer Derek Chauvin. No major opposition to the protest occurred.

=== Blue Hill ===
June 4: Over 30 people, mostly students of the local high school or college students returned home as a result of the coronavirus pandemic, gathered for a day-long protest on the lawn of the Blue Hill Town Hall, displaying pro-Black Lives Matter signs and waving at traffic. A vigil was also organized and held at 2 p.m. that day.

=== Bridgton ===
June 6: In the morning of June 6, approximately 50 protesters peacefully gathered in Bridgton to show solidarity with Black Lives Matter, and particularly to express grief and anger over the murder of George Floyd. The protest lasted around an hour, and two periods of silence were taken, lasting 8 minutes and 46 seconds each. Two local police officers attended the event.

=== Brooksville ===
June 8: A small Black Lives Matter vigil was held in Brooksville, with around 20 people gathered for the event. 8 minutes and 46 seconds of silence were observed in honor of George Floyd's unlawful murder.

=== Camden ===
June 3: A gathering formed at the Camden Village Green to express grief and outrage over the murder of George Floyd. Political, religious and law enforcement officials were asked to speak.

=== Caribou ===
June 1: About 40 protesters marched down Herschel Street in Caribou against the murder of George Floyd.

=== Castine ===
June 9: Over 100 people, drawn from the town and surrounding areas, gathered in downtown Castine to peacefully protest unlawful treatment toward people of color by police officers, and to show solidarity with the Black Lives Matter movement. Protesters gathered at historic Fort George before the crowd marched down to the town waterfront, chanting "I Can't Breathe" and other slogans of the movement. Several protesters gave impassioned speeches after arriving at the waterfront.

=== Deer Isle ===
- June 7: Residents of Deer Isle gathered on the intersection of Route 15 and Main Street to protest against the murder of George Floyd and to show support for Black Lives Matter. Despite being organized just two days before the protest, 115 protesters gathered on Sunday afternoon, holding signs and denouncing police brutality.
- June 19: On Juneteenth, a noose was found hanging from a telephone wire on Little Deer Isle with a large "White Lives Matter" sign next to it. Several Black Lives Matter signs in the area were also defaced and vandalized along with the noose being hung, following a series of back-and-forth aggressions by BLM supporters and anti-BLM residents in which BLM and All Lives Matter signs were torn down and graffitied as part of racially-charged tensions occurring since the first protest on June 7.
- June 20: Following the discovery of the noose and the defacing of signs on the day prior, a candlelight vigil was held on the night of June 20. Approximately 125 residents attended the quiet vigil at sunset.
- June 21: As a further response to the incident on June 19, another organized protest gathered in the town of Deer Isle, this time attracting 165 protesters, the largest gathering on the island thus far.

=== Ellsworth ===
June 2: An estimated 350 people formed a crowd in Ellsworth in support of Black Lives Matter, spurred by murder of George Floyd, who was also honored during the gathering. Organized just one day prior, the crowd amassed at the Ellsworth Public Library, then moved down to the Union River Bridge, before marching up Main Street and finally gathering in front of the Ellsworth City Hall, where some members of the mass gave speeches. The protest was largely peaceful and monitored by local police, who were not harassed by protesters during the event. The crowd dispersed after four hours of protesting.

=== Farmington ===
June 1: A crowd of more than 100 gathers to march through Farmington in protest of George Floyd's murder. Several protesters spoke during the event, including Farmington police chief, Jack Peck Jr. Names of other victims of police violence apart from Floyd were also read out.

=== Gray ===
June 7: Residents of Gray and New Gloucester gathered for a small protest at the intersection of Shaker Road and Main Street in Gray, chanting slogans of the Black Lives Matter movement and holding signs denouncing police brutality and promoting equality. The event was organized by students of the Gray-New Gloucester High School.

=== Kittery ===
June 6: About 1000 protesters took part in a march from Traip Academy to Portsmouth, New Hampshire organized by former and current Traip students.

=== Lewiston ===
June 1: Hundreds gathered in Simard-Payne Park before marching to Auburn City Hall and police headquarters. On Longley Bridge, the protesters staged a 2 minute long "die in," in which the protesters laid face down on the road with their hands behind their backs while some police officers took a knee alongside them.

=== Naples ===
June 4: Approximately 50 protesters peacefully demonstrated by the Naples causeway to show support for Black Lives Matter and in memory of George Floyd. Some protesters gave speeches before the group briefly kneeled in silence and ended the protest, in accordance with an agreement made with local police that the protest would disperse within a certain amount of time. The protest received scrutiny and threats from anti-BLM residents of the area, and the organizers of the gathering claimed the town had cast the protest in a poor light in a public notice made by the town manager.

=== Portland ===
- May 29: Hundreds of people protested peacefully downtown. One group blocked Franklin Street. There was no evidence of violence and no arrests were made. However, an unidentified sniper was seen scoping out the protest, which raised concerns for the safety of the protesters.
- June 1–2: A demonstration from Portland’s police station to the downtown area was largely peaceful and peaked at 1,000 protesters, although it became ridden with violence and vandalism at around 9 p.m., and demonstrators or rioters were present in the area until 2 a.m. Rocks, bottles, bricks and other objects were thrown at police, with no serious injuries reported, and police cars were vandalized. Several businesses suffered minimal property damage, and small fires were set in garbage cans. 23 people were arrested, with 22 of those arrests being for failure to disperse, and one man was arrested for driving a tractor trailer in a protesting zone.
- June 5: A protest by the Portland Chapter of Black Lives Matter held a protest with attendance of over 2,000, the largest of the movement in Maine. The protest was held for 8 hours to symbolize the approximately 8 eight minutes the officer knelt on George Floyd's neck. The protest started in Lincoln Park and made several stops throughout the city, including a face down protest on Commercial Street and culminating in the words "I Can't Breathe" being projected onto Portland's City Hall.

=== Presque Isle ===
May 30: More than 30 people gathered on Main Street in Presque Isle to protest against police brutality and racism.

=== Rockland ===
June 1: About 250-300 protesters gathered in Rockland's Chapman Park on June 2 to chant the name George Floyd and protest police brutality.

=== Sanford ===
June 6: Hundreds marched from Gowen Park to the police station where the city's curfew has been called "unconstitutional" by the ACLU.

=== South Portland ===
June 4: Roughly 300 people marched from South Portland High School to the South Portland Police station. Organized by students of the high school, several speakers in the community were invited to address the crowd – including the Chief of Police, Timothy Sheehan.

=== Waterville ===
June 7: Approximately 500 gathered in downtown Waterville to march through the town in memory of George Floyd. When the gathered protesters arrived at their destination, many local figures were asked to speak. The event concluded with a nine-minute kneel in George Floyd's honor. Several police officers from the surrounding areas also attended the march, which lasted one hour.
