= Bud Edwards =

American football player (1908–1986)

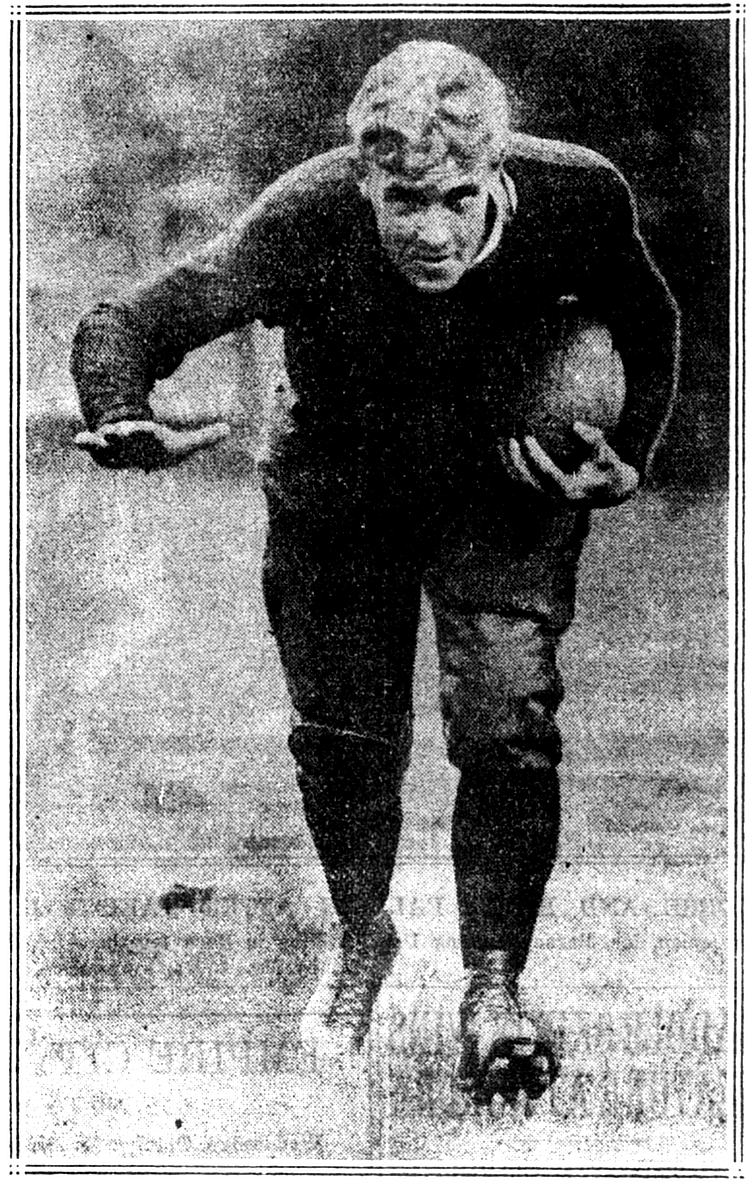

Profile
- Positions: Halfback, fullback, end

Personal information
- Born: March 21, 1908; Chicago
- Died: August 11, 1986 (aged 78); Scottsdale, Arizona
- Listed height: 5 ft 11 in (1.80 m)
- Listed weight: 190 lb (86 kg)

Career information
- High school: Moses Brown School (RI)
- College: Brown

Career history
- Providence Steam Roller (1930-1931); Chicago Bears (1931)

Charles Halleck "Bud" Edwards (March 21, 1908 – August 11, 1986) was an American football player.

Edwards was born in 1907 in Chicago, Illinois. He attended Moses Brown High School in Providence, Rhode Island. He then enrolled at Brown University Where he played college football from 1926 to 1929. He was selected as the captain of the 1929 Brown Bears football team.

He also played professional football in the National Football League (NFL) as a halfback and fullback for the Providence Steam Roller in 1930 and 1931 and for the Chicago Bears in 1931. He appeared in 19 NFL games, seven as a starter. He also played for the Passaic Red Devils of the Interstate Football League as an end in 1933.

After his football career ended, Edwards worked as an investments executive. In 1981, he moved from Indiana to Paradise Valley, Arizona. He died in 1986 in Scottsdale, Arizona.
