= 1929 Long Island Golden Tornado football team =

American college football season

1929 Long Island Golden Tornado football

Metropolitan champion
- Conference: Metropolitan Collegiate Conference
- Record: 5–5 (4–0 Metropolitan)
- Head coach: Herbert Raubenheimer (2nd season)
- Captain: Milt Anker
- Home stadium: Hawthorne Field

1929 Metropolitan Collegiate Conference football standings
	Conf.					Overall
Team	W		L		T	W		L		T
Long Island $	4	–	0	–	0	5	–	5	–	0
Brooklyn City College	3	–	1	–	0	3	–	4	–	1
New York Aggies	2	–	2	–	0	3	–	2	–	1
Cooper Union	1	–	3	–	0	1	–	7	–	0
Wagner College	0	–	4	–	0	1	–	7	–	0
$ – Conference champion

The 1929 Long Island Golden Tornado football team represented Long Island University as a member of the Metropolitan Collegiate Conference during the 1929 college football season. Led by second-year head coach Herbert Raubenheimer, the Golden Tornado compiled an overall record of 5–5 with a mark of 4–0 in conference play, winning the Metropolitan Collegiate Conference title. The team played home games at Hawthorne Field in Brooklyn. Milt Anker was the team's captain.

In Long Island's season finale against Brooklyn City College on November 29, a scoring system devised by Pop Warner was used where one point was awarded for each first down gained by the offensive team. Tries after touchdowns were eliminated as was the kickoff in the second half. Instead play resumed where it had ended in the first half.

== Schedule ==
Date	Opponent	Site	Result	Attendance	Source
September 28	at RPI*	Troy, NY	L 0–13		
October 5	Rider*	Hawthorne Field; Brooklyn, NY	L 0–19		
October 12	at Coast Guard*	New London, CT	L 0–25		
October 19	at Wagner College	Wagner Field; Staten Island, NY	W 37–0		
October 26	at Upsala*	East Orange, NJ	L 0–14		
November 2	Buffalo*	Hawthorne Field; Brooklyn, NY	L 0–12		
November 9	New York Aggies	Hawthorne Field; Brooklyn, NY	W 13–6		
November 16	Montclair Teachers*	Hawthorne Field; Brooklyn, NY	W 18–6		
November 23	Cooper Union	Hawthorne Field; Brooklyn, NY	W 13–12		
November 29	at Brooklyn City College	Lewisohn Stadium; New York, NY	W 22–11	3,000	
*Non-conference game
