= William V. Rattan =

American football player and coach (1890–1985)

Biographical details
- Born: October 3, 1890; Cooper, Texas, U.S.
- Died: May 6, 1985 (aged 94)

Playing career
- 1910–1912: TCU

Coaching career (HC unless noted)
- 1921: Far East Championship
- 1926–1927: Vermont (assistant)
- 1928–1929: Vermont

Head coaching record
- Overall: 3–14–2 (college)

William Volney Rattan (October 3, 1890 – May 6, 1985) was an American college football player and coach. He served as the head football coach at the University of Vermont from 1928 to 1929. Rattan also coached in the 1921 Far Eastern Games while stationed in the United States Army.

== Head coaching record ==
Year	Team	Overall	Conference	Standing	Bowl/playoffs
Vermont Catamounts (Independent) (1928–1929)
1928	Vermont	1–7–2			
1929	Vermont	2–7			
Vermont:		3–14–2			
Total:		3–14–2			
