= Mal Bleecker =

American football player (1906–1941)

Profile
- Positions: Tackle, guard, center

Personal information
- Born: October 6, 1906
- Died: April 11, 1941 (aged 34); New York City, New York, U.S.
- Listed height: 6 ft 0 in (1.83 m)
- Listed weight: 205 lb (93 kg)

Career information
- High school: Flushing (NY), Mercersburg Academy (PA)
- College: Columbia

Career history
- Brooklyn Dodgers (1930)

Career statistics
- Games played: 3
- Stats at Pro Football Reference

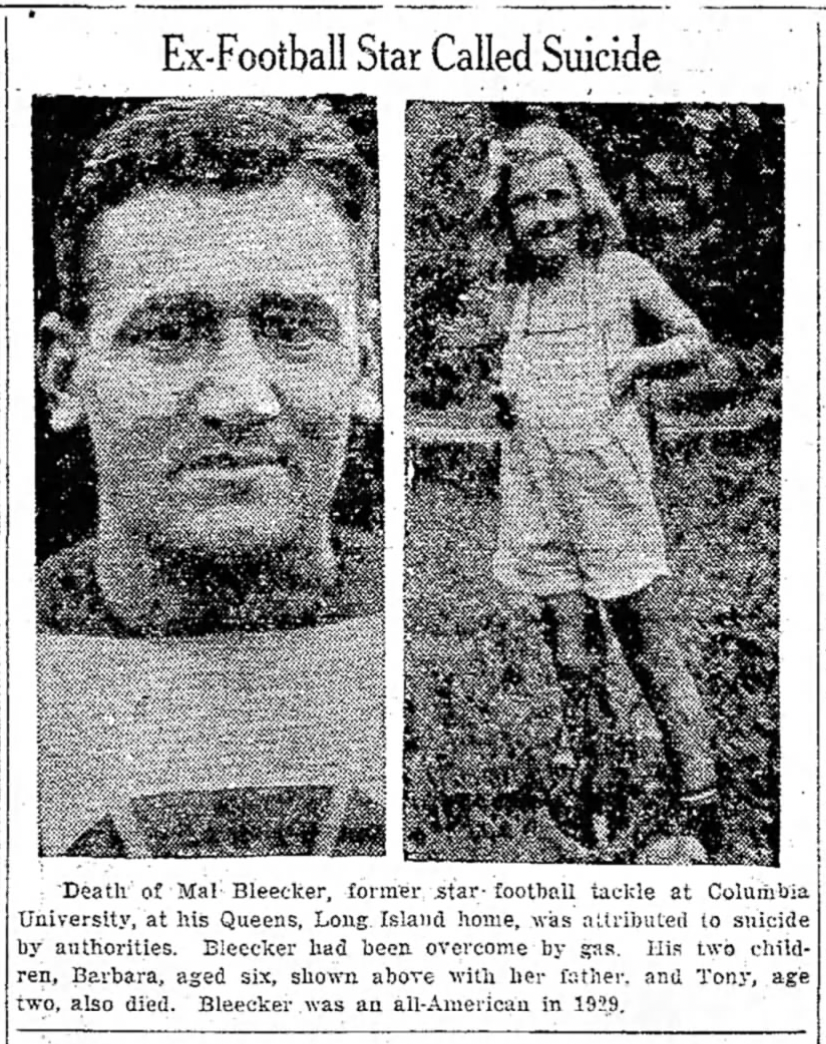
15 Apr 1941 newspaper clipping

Malcolm S. Bleecker (October 6, 1906 – April 11, 1941) was an American football player.

He played college football as a tackle for the Columbia Lions and was captain of the 1929 team. In 1930, he received the Edward Sutliff Brainerd Memorial Prize as the senior "adjudged by his classmates as most worthy of distinction on the ground of his qualities of mind and character."

He later played professional football in the National Football League (NFL) as a guard and center for the Brooklyn Dodgers. He appeared in three NFL games during the 1930 season.

After retiring from football, Bleecker worked as an insurance salesman. In a suicide, his two children, and their cocker spaniel in 1941 died by gas at his home in Bayside, Queens. He was age 34 at the time of his death.
