= Jay L. Lee =

American football player and coach (1887–1970)

Biographical details
- Born: September 27, 1887; Tuscola County, Michigan, U.S.
- Died: April 10, 1970 (aged 82); Traverse City, Michigan, U.S.

Playing career

Football
- 1910: Albion
- 1911: Notre Dame
- Position: Quarterback

Coaching career (HC unless noted)

Football
- 1915: Penn (IA)
- 1916: Notre Dame (assistant)
- 1917–1920: Penn (IA)
- 1922: Cornell (IA) (assistant)
- 1929–1930: Buffalo

Basketball
- 1919–1921: Penn (IA)

Baseball
- 1916: Penn (IA)
- 1923: Cornell (IA)

Head coaching record
- Overall: 17–20–4 (football); 6–12 (basketball)

Jay L. "Biffy" Lee (September 27, 1887 – April 10, 1970) was an American college football player and coach. He served as the head football coach at Penn College—now known as William Penn University—in Oskaloosa, Iowa, in 1915 and again from 1917 to 1920 and at the University of Buffalo—now known as University at Buffalo—from 1929 to 1930, compiling a career college football record of 17–20–4.

== Playing career ==
In 1910, Lee attended Albion College, where he played football and baseball. In 1911, he was the quarterback at the University of Notre Dame. He was the college roommate of Knute Rockne.

== Coaching career ==
In 1916, Lee was an assistant football coach at Notre Dame. He served as the head football coach at the University of Buffalo from 1929 to 1930, compiling a record of 8–7. He was also on the faculty of the University of Buffalo, lecturing in the School of Marketing.

In 1931, he unexpectedly resigned as the head coach of the Buffalo football program to attend to business duties.

== Late life and death ==
Lee work as an executive for the Phoenix Mutual Life Insurance Company for 27 years until his retirement in 1952. He died on April 10, 1970, in Traverse City, Michigan.

== Head coaching record ==
Year	Team	Overall	Conference	Standing	Bowl/playoffs
Penn (Iowa) Quakers (Independent) (1915)
1915	Penn	4–3			
Penn (Iowa) Quakers (Independent) (1917–1920)
1917	Penn	4–1–1			
1918	No team—World War I				
1919	Penn	0–3–3			
1920	Penn	1–6			
Penn:		9–14–3			
Buffalo Bisons (New York State Conference) (1929–1930)
1929	Buffalo	5–2			
1930	Buffalo	3–5			
Buffalo:		8–7			
Total:		17–20–4			
