= Herbert Raubenheimer =

American football player and coach (1896–1978)

Biographical details
- Born: October 27, 1896; Irvington, New Jersey, U.S.
- Died: March 10, 1978 (aged 81); Holyoke, Massachusetts, U.S.

Playing career

Football
- c. 1918: Camp Gordon

Basketball
- c. 1918: Philadelphia College of Pharmacy
- Position: Forward (basketball)

Coaching career (HC unless noted)

Football
- 1928–1930: Long Island

Basketball
- 1928–1930: Long Island

Baseball
- 1929: Long Island

Administrative career (AD unless noted)
- 1927–1931: Long Island

Head coaching record
- Overall: 13–12–1 (football)

Accomplishments and honors

Championships
- Football; 1 Metropolitan Collegiate Conference (1929)

Herbert Carl Raubenheimer (October 27, 1896 – March 10, 1978) was an American educator, college sports coach and administrator, and pharmacist.

Raubenheimer was born on October 27, 1896, in Irvington, New Jersey, to Otto and Meta (Holtztacker) Raubenheimer. He starred in athletics at Boys High School in Brooklyn as a lineman in football, guard in basketball, and catcher in baseball. He then attended the Philadelphia College of Pharmacy, where he played basketball as a forward before graduating in 1918. Raubenheimer served as a sergeant in the United States Army during World War II. While stationed at Camp Gordon in Georgia, he played for the football team.

From 1919 to 1927, Raubenheimer managed his father's pharmaceutical and chemical laboratory. In December 1927, he was hired at Long Island University (LIU) as athletic director and coach of football, basketball, and baseball. Raubenheimer left LIU in 1931 to become a professor of commercial pharmacy at St. John's University in Queens. He taught at St. John's for 22 years and was later a professor at Northeastern University School of Pharmacy for 14 years. He taught at Hampden College of Pharmacy in Springfield, Massachusetts from 1968 until his retirement in 1970.

Raubenheimer died on March 10, 1978, at Holyoke Hospital in Holyoke, Massachusetts. He was buried at Cypress Hills Cemetery in Brooklyn.

== Head coaching record ==
=== Football ===
Year	Team	Overall	Conference	Standing	Bowl/playoffs
Long Island Golden Tornado (Metropolitan Collegiate Conference) (1928–1929)
1928	Long Island	5–3–1	2–1–1	1st	
1929	Long Island	5–5	4–0	1st	
Long Island Golden Tornado (Independent) (1930)
1930	Long Island	3–4			
Long Island:		13–12–1	6–1–1		
Total:		13–12–1			
National championship Conference title Conference division title or championship game berth
