= 1926 Boston University Terriers football team =

American college football season

1926 Boston University Terriers football
- Conference: Independent
- Record: 2–6
- Head coach: Reggie Brown & Edward N. Robinson (1st season)
- Home stadium: Fenway Park, Tufts Oval

1926 Eastern college football independents records
	Conf.			Overall
Team	W	L	T	W		L		T
No. 5 Lafayette		–		9	–	0	–	0
No. 10 Brown		–		9	–	0	–	1
NYU		–		8	–	1	–	0
No. 9 Army		–		7	–	1	–	1
Washington & Jefferson		–		7	–	1	–	1
Boston College		–		6	–	0	–	2
No. 10 Penn		–		7	–	1	–	1
Cornell		–		6	–	1	–	1
Princeton		–		5	–	1	–	1
Carnegie Tech		–		7	–	2	–	0
Springfield		–		6	–	2	–	0
Syracuse		–		7	–	2	–	1
Villanova		–		6	–	2	–	1
Colgate		–		5	–	2	–	2
Columbia		–		6	–	3	–	0
Pittsburgh		–		5	–	2	–	2
CCNY		–		5	–	3	–	0
Temple		–		5	–	3	–	0
Penn State		–		5	–	4	–	0
Tufts		–		4	–	4	–	0
Yale		–		4	–	4	–	0
Bucknell		–		4	–	5	–	1
Fordham		–		3	–	4	–	1
Harvard		–		3	–	5	–	0
Rutgers		–		3	–	6	–	0
Vermont		–		3	–	6	–	0
Drexel		–		2	–	5	–	0
Boston University		–		2	–	6	–	0
Lehigh		–		1	–	8	–	0
Franklin & Marshall		–		0	–	8	–	1
Rankings from Dickinson System

The 1926 Boston University Terriers football team was an American football team that represented Boston University as an independent during the 1926 college football season. In its first season under head coaches Reggie Brown and Edward N. Robinson, the team compiled a 2–6 record and was outscored by a total of 154 to 28.

== Schedule ==
Date	Time	Opponent	Site	Result	Attendance	Source
September 25		at Bowdoin	Brunswick, ME	L 0–6		
October 2		at Yale	Yale Bowl; New Haven, CT	L 0–51		
October 16		Middlebury	Tufts Oval; Medford, MA	L 6–7	3,000	
October 23		at Army	Michie Stadium; West Point, NY	L 0–41		
October 30	2:30 p.m.	Springfield	Fenway Park; Boston, MA	L 3–10		
November 6		at Dartmouth	Memorial Field; Hanover, NH	L 0–32		
November 13	2:00 p.m.	at Tufts	Tufts Oval; Medford, MA	W 7–13		
November 20		at Holy Cross	Fitton Field; Worcester, MA	W 3–0		
All times are in Eastern time
