= Lou Young (American football coach) =

American football player and coach (1893–1948)

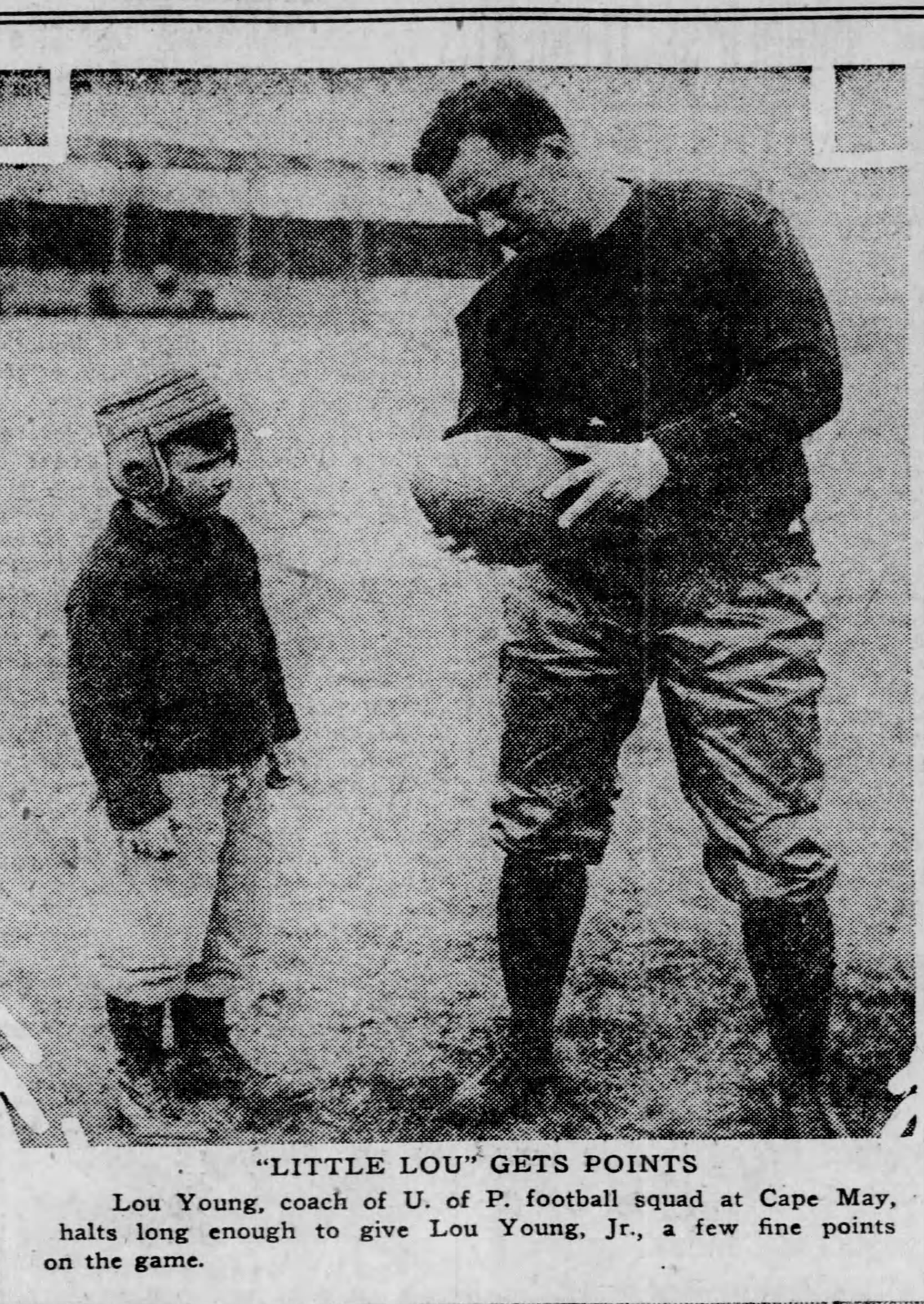
- Young with his son in 1924

Biographical details
- Born: February 19, 1893; Philadelphia, Pennsylvania, U.S.
- Died: July 19, 1948 (aged 55); Philadelphia, Pennsylvania, U.S.

Playing career
- 1912–1914: Penn
- Positions: End, halfback

Coaching career (HC unless noted)
- 1922: Penn (assistant)
- 1923–1929: Penn
- 1933: Philadelphia Marines

Administrative career (AD unless noted)
- 1929–1931: Penn (athletics assistant chair)

Head coaching record
- Overall: 49–15–2

Louis Alonzo Young (February 19, 1893 – July 19, 1948) was an American college football player and coach. He played football at the University of Pennsylvania from 1912 to 1914, captaining the team in 1913. Young later served as Penn's head football coach from 1923 to 1929, compiling a record of 49–15–2, and as the assistant chairman on the school's Council of Athletics from 1929 to 1931. He also coached a United States Marine Corps football team at the Philadelphia Naval Shipyard.

He died at the age of 56 on July 19, 1948, in Philadelphia.

== Head coaching record ==
| Year | Team | Overall | Conference | Standing | Bowl/playoffs |
|---|---|---|---|---|---|
Penn Quakers (Independent) (1923–1929)
| 1923 | Penn | 5–4 | | | |
| 1924 | Penn | 9–1–1 | | | |
| 1925 | Penn | 7–2 | | | |
| 1926 | Penn | 7–1–1 | | | |
| 1927 | Penn | 6–4 | | | |
| 1928 | Penn | 8–1 | | | |
| 1929 | Penn | 7–2 | | | |
| Penn: | | 49–15–2 | | | |
| Total: | | 49–15–2 | | | |
National championship Conference title Conference division title or championship game berth
