= Reggie Brown (American football coach) =

American football player and coach (1876–1961)

Biographical details
- Born: March 13, 1876; South Braintree, Massachusetts, U.S.
- Died: January 31, 1961 (aged 84); Newton Centre, Massachusetts, U.S.
- Education: Harvard University (1898)

Playing career
- 1894–1897: Harvard
- Position: Running back

Coaching career (HC unless noted)
- 1902–1905: Harvard (second team)
- 1906: Harvard (lead assistant)
- 1908–1916: Harvard (chief scout/strategist)
- 1922–1925: Brown (assistant)
- 1926–1929: Boston University (co-HC)
- 1932: Holy Cross (assistant)
- 1934: Northeastern (scout)
- 1935: Boston Redskins (assistant)
- 1944: Woburn HS (MA) (scout)
- 1945: Milford HS (MA)
- 1947–1948: Boston College (head scout)

Head coaching record
- Overall: 11–19–3

Reginald Woodman Plummer Brown (March 13, 1876 – January 31, 1961) was an American football player, coach, and scout who served as the co-head football coach at Boston University from 1926 to 1929, compiling a record of 11–19–3. He also coached at Harvard University and Brown University.

== Early life ==
Brown attended Newton High School. He was on the Newton team that won the 1892 junior interscholastic championship and was captain of the 1893 squad. He played tackle for the Harvard freshman team and fullback and halfback for the varsity team. He was a skilled rusher as well as a good punter and dropkicker. He graduated from Harvard College in 1898.

== Coaching ==
Brown coached Harvard's second team from 1902 to 1905. In 1906 head coach Bill Reid promoted him to head of field work and scouting. Reid left after the 1906 season and recommended Brown for the head coaching position, however Joshua Crane was chosen instead. Brown served as Harvard's chief scout and strategist under Percy Haughton. Melville E. Webb Jr. credited Brown with being a "big factor in Crimson's success" and R. L. Groves credited Brown for Harvard's "excellent defensive system" in the 1914 Harvard–Yale game. Brown gave up his chief strategist role in 1917. From 1919 to 1921 he occasionally consulted the Harvard scouting staff and scouted Navy for Army. In 1922 he returned to coaching as an assistant to Edward N. Robinson at Brown Robinson and Brown were let go after the 1925 season.

On April 2, 1926, athletic director George V. Brown hired Robinson and Brown to coach the Boston University football team. It was hoped that the pair would be able to turn BU into a major football program, however, the school was unable to recruit top talent and did not turn out a winning product under Brown and Robinson. In 1926, athletic director W. J. Bingham offered Brown the opportunity to return to Harvard to coach with Huntington Hardwick. The plan was for Brown and Robinson to be in charge of strategy and for Hardwick to teach fundamentals. However, neither Brown and Hardwick would take the job unless they were given the final authority on coaching decisions, which led to the head coaching job going to Arnold Horween instead. By 1930, BU, which had suffered from poor gate receipts during their losing seasons, decided to cut back on its coaches' salaries and reduced the coaching staff from three to two, which led to Brown and Robinson's departure.

Brown was a member of the Holy Cross coaching staff in 1932, scouted for Northeastern in 1934, and was an assistant coach for the National Football League's Boston Redskins in 1935. In 1940, Brown was named Massachusetts director of physical activities for the national defense program of the National Youth Administration. In 1944 he scouted for Woburn Memorial High School. The following year he served as the interim coach of Milford High School while head coach Charles Brucato was serving in the United States Marine Corps. In 1947, Brown was named the head scout at Boston College.

Brown died on January 31, 1961, at his home in Newton Centre, Massachusetts.

== Head coaching record ==
Year	Team	Overall	Conference	Standing	Bowl/playoffs
Boston University Terriers / Pioneers (Independent) (1926–1929)
1926	Boston University	2–6			
1927	Boston University	3–4–1			
1928	Boston University	3–3–2			
1929	Boston University	3–6			
Boston University:		11–19–3			
Total:		11–19–3			
