= Edward N. Robinson =

American football player and coach (1873–1945)

Biographical details
- Born: October 15, 1873; Sabattus, Maine, U.S.
- Died: March 10, 1945 (aged 71); Brookline, Massachusetts, U.S.

Playing career

Football
- 1892–1895: Brown
- Position: Halfback

Coaching career (HC unless noted)

Football
- 1896–1897: Nebraska
- 1898–1901: Brown
- 1902: Maine
- 1903: Phillips Exeter Academy (NH)
- 1904–1907: Brown
- 1909: Tufts
- 1910–1925: Brown
- 1926–1929: Boston University (co-HC)
- 1931: Providence Steam Roller

Baseball
- 1897: Nebraska
- 1901: Yale
- 1902–1903: Phillips Exeter Academy (NH)

Head coaching record
- Overall: 170–113–16 (college football); 4–4–3 (NFL); 8–5–1 (college baseball)
- Bowls: 0–1

Accomplishments and honors

Championships
- 1 WIUFA (1897); 1 MIAA (1902)
- College Football Hall of Fame; Inducted in 1955 (profile)

Edward North "Robbie" Robinson (October 15, 1873 – March 10, 1945) was an American football and baseball coach. He served as the head football coach at the University of Nebraska, Brown University, University of Maine, and Tufts College—now known as Tufts University, and co-head football coach at Boston University. He also coached for the Providence Steam Roller of the National Football League (NFL). He was inducted into the College Football Hall of Fame in 1955.

== Early life ==
Robinson was born in Sabattus, Maine, and attended Danvers High School and the Dean Academy. He played halfback for the Brown Bears football team and was a pitcher and right field for the Brown Bears baseball team. Robinson was selected by Walter Camp in 1895 as a Third Team All-American. He graduated from Brown in 1896 and earned a degree from the Boston University School of Law in 1898.

== Coaching ==
=== Football ===
Robinson began his coaching career at Nebraska. He compiled a 11-4-1 record over two seasons and led Nebraska to its ever first conference championship. He then coached at his alma mater from 1898 to 1901. He coached at the University of Maine in 1902 and at Phillips Exeter Academy in 1903. He returned to Brown in 1904 and remained there until 1907. After one year as the head coach at Tufts, he returned to Brown for his third stint as head coach. In 1923 he turned down the opportunity to become the head coach of the Alabama Crimson Tide football team. Robinson and his assistant Reggie Brown were let go after the 1925 season, ending his 24 year tenure as Brown’s head coach. On April 2, 1926, athletic director George V. Brown hired Robinson and Brown to coach the Boston University football team. They served as co-head coaches of BU until 1930, when they were replaced by Hilary Mahaney. In 1931, Robinson coached the Providence Steam Roller of the National Football League. Under Robinson, the Steam Roller finished the 1931 season 4–4–3 record.

=== Baseball ===
In 1901, Robinson was hired to coach baseball at Yale University. The following year he led the Phillips Exeter baseball team to a championship. He was retained by Phillips Exeter for the following season and given the additional role as head football coach.

== Later life ==
A longtime resident of Danvers, Massachusetts, Robinson spent his later years in Boston's Brighton neighborhood and was in charge of football for the Boston Parks Department. He died on March 10, 1945, at Corey Hill Hospital in Brookline, Massachusetts.

== Head coaching record ==
=== College football ===
Year	Team	Overall	Conference	Standing	Bowl/playoffs
Nebraska Bugeaters (Western Interstate University Football Association) (1896–1897)
1896	Nebraska	6–3–1	1–1–1	3rd	
1897	Nebraska	5–1	3–0	1st	
Nebraska:		11–4–1	4–1–1		
Brown Bears (Independent) (1898–1901)
1898	Brown	6–4			
1899	Brown	7–3–1			
1900	Brown	7–3–1			
1901	Brown	4–7–1			
Maine (Maine Intercollegiate Athletic Association) (1902)
1902	Maine	6–2	3–1	1st	
Maine:		6–2	3–1		
Brown Bears (Independent) (1904–1907)
1904	Brown	6–5			
1905	Brown	7–4			
1906	Brown	6–3			
1907	Brown	7–3			
Tufts Jumbos (Independent) (1909)
1909	Tufts	2–6			
Tufts:		2–6			
Brown Bears (Independent) (1910–1925)
1910	Brown	7–2–1			
1911	Brown	7–3–1			
1912	Brown	6–4			
1913	Brown	4–5			
1914	Brown	5–2–1			
1915	Brown	5–4–1			L Rose
1916	Brown	8–1			
1917	Brown	8–2			
1918	Brown	2–3			
1919	Brown	5–4–1			
1920	Brown	6–3			
1921	Brown	5–3–1			
1922	Brown	6–2–1			
1923	Brown	6–4			
1924	Brown	5–4			
1925	Brown	5–4–1			
Brown:		140–82–12			
Boston University Terriers/Pioneers (Independent) (1926–1929)
1926	Boston University	2–6			
1927	Boston University	3–4–1			
1928	Boston University	3–3–2			
1929	Boston University	3–6			
Boston University:		11–19–3			
Total:		170–113–16			

=== NFL ===
Team	Year	Regular season					Postseason			
Team	Year	Won	Lost	Ties	Win %	Finish	Won	Lost	Win %	Result
PSR	1931	4	4	3	.500	6th	–	–	–	–
PSR Total		4	4	3	.500	–	–	–	–	
Total		4	4	3	.500	–	–	–	–	
