= 1929 Brown Bears football team =

American college football season

1929 Brown Bears football
- Conference: Independent
- Record: 5–5
- Head coach: Tuss McLaughry (4th season)
- Captain: Bud Edwards
- Home stadium: Brown Stadium

1929 Eastern college football independents records
	Conf.			Overall
Team	W	L	T	W		L		T
No. 3 Pittsburgh		–		9	–	1	–	0
Colgate		–		8	–	1	–	0
Fordham		–		7	–	0	–	2
Bucknell		–		8	–	2	–	0
No. 11 Penn		–		7	–	2	–	0
Boston College		–		7	–	2	–	1
Villanova		–		7	–	2	–	1
Cornell		–		6	–	2	–	0
Tufts		–		5	–	1	–	2
Harvard		–		5	–	2	–	1
Yale		–		5	–	2	–	1
NYU		–		7	–	3	–	0
Franklin & Marshall		–		6	–	3	–	0
Penn State		–		6	–	3	–	0
Syracuse		–		6	–	3	–	0
Washington & Jefferson		–		5	–	2	–	2
Drexel		–		6	–	3	–	1
Temple		–		6	–	3	–	1
Carnegie Tech		–		5	–	3	–	1
Army		–		6	–	4	–	1
Providence		–		3	–	3	–	2
Brown		–		5	–	5	–	0
Columbia		–		4	–	5	–	0
CCNY		–		2	–	4	–	2
Princeton		–		2	–	4	–	1
Boston University		–		3	–	6	–	0
Vermont		–		2	–	7	–	0
Rankings from Dickinson System

The 1929 Brown Bears football team represented Brown University as an independent during the 1929 college football season. Led by fourth-year head coach Tuss McLaughry, the Bears compiled a record of 5–5.

== Schedule ==
Date	Opponent	Site	Result	Attendance	Source
September 28	at Springfield	Pratt Field; Springfield, MA	L 6–14		
October 5	Rhode Island State	Brown Stadium; Providence, RI (rivalry)	W 14–6		
October 12	at Princeton	Palmer Stadium; Princeton, NJ	W 13–12		
October 19	at Yale	Yale Bowl; New Haven, CT	L 6–14		
October 26	Syracuse	Brown Stadium; Providence, RI	L 0–6		
November 2	at Holy Cross	Fitton Field; Worcester, MA	W 15–14		
November 9	Dartmouth	Brown Stadium; Providence, RI	L 6–13	20,000	
November 16	Norwich	Brown Stadium; Providence, RI	W 66–6		
November 23	New Hampshire	Brown Stadium; Providence, RI	W 14–7		
November 30	Colgate	Brown Stadium; Providence, RI	L 0–32		
