= 1929 Harvard Crimson football team =

American college football season

1929 Harvard Crimson football
- Conference: Independent
- Record: 5–2–1
- Head coach: Arnold Horween (4th season)
- Captain: James E. Barrett
- Home stadium: Harvard Stadium

1929 Eastern college football independents records
	Conf.			Overall
Team	W	L	T	W		L		T
No. 3 Pittsburgh		–		9	–	1	–	0
Colgate		–		8	–	1	–	0
Fordham		–		7	–	0	–	2
Bucknell		–		8	–	2	–	0
No. 11 Penn		–		7	–	2	–	0
Boston College		–		7	–	2	–	1
Villanova		–		7	–	2	–	1
Cornell		–		6	–	2	–	0
Tufts		–		5	–	1	–	2
Harvard		–		5	–	2	–	1
Yale		–		5	–	2	–	1
NYU		–		7	–	3	–	0
Franklin & Marshall		–		6	–	3	–	0
Penn State		–		6	–	3	–	0
Syracuse		–		6	–	3	–	0
Washington & Jefferson		–		5	–	2	–	2
Drexel		–		6	–	3	–	1
Temple		–		6	–	3	–	1
Carnegie Tech		–		5	–	3	–	1
Army		–		6	–	4	–	1
Providence		–		3	–	3	–	2
Brown		–		5	–	5	–	0
Columbia		–		4	–	5	–	0
CCNY		–		2	–	4	–	2
Princeton		–		2	–	4	–	1
Boston University		–		3	–	6	–	0
Vermont		–		2	–	7	–	0
Rankings from Dickinson System

The 1929 Harvard Crimson football team represented Harvard University in the 1929 college football season. The Crimson were led by fourth-year head coach Arnold Horween. They played their home games in Harvard Stadium with a capacity crowd of 57,166.

== Schedule ==
Date	Opponent	Site	Result	Attendance	Source
October 5	Bates	Harvard Stadium; Boston, MA	W 48–0		
October 12	New Hampshire	Harvard Stadium; Boston, MA	W 35–0		
October 19	Army	Harvard Stadium; Boston, MA	T 20–20		
October 26	Dartmouth	Harvard Stadium; Boston, MA	L 7–34	60,000	
November 2	Florida	Harvard Stadium; Boston, MA	W 14–0	35,000	
November 9	at Michigan	Michigan Stadium; Ann Arbor, MI	L 12–14	85,042	
November 16	Holy Cross	Harvard Stadium; Boston, MA	W 12–6		
November 23	Yale	Harvard Stadium; Boston, MA (rivalry)	W 10–6		
