= 1929 Fordham Rams football team =

American football team

1929 Fordham Rams football
- Conference: Independent
- Record: 7–0–2
- Head coach: Frank Cavanaugh (3rd season)
- Captain: Tony Siano
- Home stadium: Fordham Field, Polo Grounds

1929 Eastern college football independents records
	Conf.			Overall
Team	W	L	T	W		L		T
No. 3 Pittsburgh		–		9	–	1	–	0
Colgate		–		8	–	1	–	0
Fordham		–		7	–	0	–	2
Bucknell		–		8	–	2	–	0
No. 11 Penn		–		7	–	2	–	0
Boston College		–		7	–	2	–	1
Villanova		–		7	–	2	–	1
Cornell		–		6	–	2	–	0
Tufts		–		5	–	1	–	2
Harvard		–		5	–	2	–	1
Yale		–		5	–	2	–	1
NYU		–		7	–	3	–	0
Franklin & Marshall		–		6	–	3	–	0
Penn State		–		6	–	3	–	0
Syracuse		–		6	–	3	–	0
Washington & Jefferson		–		5	–	2	–	2
Drexel		–		6	–	3	–	1
Temple		–		6	–	3	–	1
Carnegie Tech		–		5	–	3	–	1
Army		–		6	–	4	–	1
Providence		–		3	–	3	–	2
Brown		–		5	–	5	–	0
Columbia		–		4	–	5	–	0
CCNY		–		2	–	4	–	2
Princeton		–		2	–	4	–	1
Boston University		–		3	–	6	–	0
Vermont		–		2	–	7	–	0
Rankings from Dickinson System

The 1929 Fordham Rams football team was an American football team that represented Fordham University as an independent during the 1929 college football season. In its third year under head coach Frank Cavanaugh, Fordham compiled a 7–0–2 record, shut out six of nine opponents, and outscored all opponents by a total of 176 to 19.

== Schedule ==
Date	Time	Opponent	Site	Result	Attendance	Source
September 28		Westminster (PA)	Bronx, NY	W 43–0		
October 5		St. Bonaventure	Bronx, NY	W 33–0		
October 12		NYU	Polo Grounds; New York, NY	W 26–0	57,000	
October 19		Holy Cross	Polo Grounds; New York, NY (rivalry)	W 7–0		
October 26		Davis & Elkins	Polo Grounds; New York, NY	T 6–6		
November 5		West Virginia	Polo Grounds; New York, NY	T 0–0		
November 9	2:00 p.m.	at Boston College	Fenway Park; Boston, MA	W 7–6		
November 16		Thiel	Polo Grounds; New York, NY	W 40–7		
November 23		Bucknell	Polo Grounds; New York, NY	W 14–0	35,000	
All times are in Eastern time
