= 1929 Columbia Lions football team =

American college football season

1929 Columbia Lions football
- Conference: Independent
- Record: 4–5
- Head coach: Charles Crowley (5th season)
- Captain: Mal Bleecker
- Home stadium: Baker Field

1929 Eastern college football independents records
	Conf.			Overall
Team	W	L	T	W		L		T
No. 3 Pittsburgh		–		9	–	1	–	0
Colgate		–		8	–	1	–	0
Fordham		–		7	–	0	–	2
Bucknell		–		8	–	2	–	0
No. 11 Penn		–		7	–	2	–	0
Boston College		–		7	–	2	–	1
Villanova		–		7	–	2	–	1
Cornell		–		6	–	2	–	0
Tufts		–		5	–	1	–	2
Harvard		–		5	–	2	–	1
Yale		–		5	–	2	–	1
NYU		–		7	–	3	–	0
Franklin & Marshall		–		6	–	3	–	0
Penn State		–		6	–	3	–	0
Syracuse		–		6	–	3	–	0
Washington & Jefferson		–		5	–	2	–	2
Drexel		–		6	–	3	–	1
Temple		–		6	–	3	–	1
Carnegie Tech		–		5	–	3	–	1
Army		–		6	–	4	–	1
Providence		–		3	–	3	–	2
Brown		–		5	–	5	–	0
Columbia		–		4	–	5	–	0
CCNY		–		2	–	4	–	2
Princeton		–		2	–	4	–	1
Boston University		–		3	–	6	–	0
Vermont		–		2	–	7	–	0
Rankings from Dickinson System

The 1929 Columbia Lions football team was an American football team that represented Columbia University as an independent during the 1929 college football season. In its fifth and final season under head coach Charles Crowley, the team compiled a 4–5 record and outscored opponents 160 to 111. The team played its home games at Baker Field in Upper Manhattan.

== Schedule ==
Date	Opponent	Site	Result	Attendance	Source
September 28	Middlebury	Baker Field; New York, NY	W 38–6		
October 5	Union (NY)	Baker Field; New York, NY	W 31–0		
October 12	Wesleyan	Baker Field; New York, NY	W 52–0		
October 19	Dartmouth	Baker Field; New York, NY	L 0–34	40,000	
October 26	Williams	Baker Field; New York, NY	W 33–0		
November 2	at Cornell	Schoellkopf Field; Ithaca, NY (rivalry)	L 6–12		
November 9	Colgate	Baker Field; New York, NY	L 0–33		
November 16	Penn	Baker Field; New York, NY	L 0–20	30,000	
November 28	Syracuse	Baker Field; New York, NY	L 0–6	20,000	
