= 1929 Boston University Pioneers football team =

American college football season

1929 Boston University Pioneers football
- Conference: Independent
- Record: 3–6
- Head coach: Reggie Brown & Edward N. Robinson (4th season)
- Home stadium: Nickerson Field

1929 Eastern college football independents records
	Conf.			Overall
Team	W	L	T	W		L		T
No. 3 Pittsburgh		–		9	–	1	–	0
Colgate		–		8	–	1	–	0
Fordham		–		7	–	0	–	2
Bucknell		–		8	–	2	–	0
No. 11 Penn		–		7	–	2	–	0
Boston College		–		7	–	2	–	1
Villanova		–		7	–	2	–	1
Cornell		–		6	–	2	–	0
Tufts		–		5	–	1	–	2
Harvard		–		5	–	2	–	1
Yale		–		5	–	2	–	1
NYU		–		7	–	3	–	0
Franklin & Marshall		–		6	–	3	–	0
Penn State		–		6	–	3	–	0
Syracuse		–		6	–	3	–	0
Washington & Jefferson		–		5	–	2	–	2
Drexel		–		6	–	3	–	1
Temple		–		6	–	3	–	1
Carnegie Tech		–		5	–	3	–	1
Army		–		6	–	4	–	1
Providence		–		3	–	3	–	2
Brown		–		5	–	5	–	0
Columbia		–		4	–	5	–	0
CCNY		–		2	–	4	–	2
Princeton		–		2	–	4	–	1
Boston University		–		3	–	6	–	0
Vermont		–		2	–	7	–	0
Rankings from Dickinson System

The 1929 Boston University Pioneers football team was an American football team that represented Boston University as an independent during the 1929 college football season. In its fourth and final season under head coach Reggie Brown & Edward N. Robinson, the team compiled a 3–6 record and was outscored by a total of 187 to 103.

== Schedule ==
Date	Time	Opponent	Site	Result	Attendance	Source
September 28		at Army	Michie Stadium; West Point, NY	L 0–26		
October 5		at New Hampshire	Memorial Field; Durham, NH	L 6–24		
October 12	2:30 p.m.	Vermont	Nickerson Field; Weston, MA	W 27–6		
October 19	2:30 p.m.	Worcester Tech	Nickerson Field; Weston, MA	W 39–6		
October 26		at Springfield	Springfield, MA	L 6–34		
November 2	2:00 p.m.	at Tufts	Tufts Oval; Medford, MA	L 0–14		
November 9		at Holy Cross	Fitton Field; Worcester, MA	L 12–44		
November 16	2:00 p.m.	Geneva	Nickerson Field; Weston, MA	W 13–0		
November 23	2:00 p.m.	at Boston College	Fenway Park; Boston, MA	L 0–33		
All times are in Eastern time
