= 1929 Yale Bulldogs football team =

American college football season

1929 Yale Bulldogs football
- Conference: Independent
- Record: 5–2–1
- Head coach: Mal Stevens (2nd season)
- Offensive scheme: Single-wing
- Captain: Waldo W. Greene
- Home stadium: Yale Bowl

1929 Eastern college football independents records
	Conf.			Overall
Team	W	L	T	W		L		T
No. 3 Pittsburgh		–		9	–	1	–	0
Colgate		–		8	–	1	–	0
Fordham		–		7	–	0	–	2
Bucknell		–		8	–	2	–	0
No. 11 Penn		–		7	–	2	–	0
Boston College		–		7	–	2	–	1
Villanova		–		7	–	2	–	1
Cornell		–		6	–	2	–	0
Tufts		–		5	–	1	–	2
Harvard		–		5	–	2	–	1
Yale		–		5	–	2	–	1
NYU		–		7	–	3	–	0
Franklin & Marshall		–		6	–	3	–	0
Penn State		–		6	–	3	–	0
Syracuse		–		6	–	3	–	0
Washington & Jefferson		–		5	–	2	–	2
Drexel		–		6	–	3	–	1
Temple		–		6	–	3	–	1
Carnegie Tech		–		5	–	3	–	1
Army		–		6	–	4	–	1
Providence		–		3	–	3	–	2
Brown		–		5	–	5	–	0
Columbia		–		4	–	5	–	0
CCNY		–		2	–	4	–	2
Princeton		–		2	–	4	–	1
Boston University		–		3	–	6	–	0
Vermont		–		2	–	7	–	0
Rankings from Dickinson System

The 1929 Yale Bulldogs football team represented Yale University in the 1929 college football season. In their second year under head coach Mal Stevens, the Bulldogs compiled a 5–2–1 record.

== Schedule ==
Date	Opponent	Site	Result	Attendance	Source
October 5	Vermont	Yale Bowl; New Haven, CT	W 89–0		
October 12	at Georgia	Sanford Field; Athens, GA	L 0–15	30,000–35,000	
October 19	Brown	Yale Bowl; New Haven, CT	W 14–6		
October 26	Army	Yale Bowl; New Haven, CT	W 21–13		
November 2	Dartmouth	Yale Bowl; New Haven, CT	W 16–12	78,000	
November 9	Maryland	Yale Bowl; New Haven, CT	T 13–13	45,000	
November 16	Princeton	Yale Bowl; New Haven, CT (rivalry)	W 13–0		
November 23	at Harvard	Harvard Stadium; Boston, MA (rivalry)	L 6–10		
