= 1929 Boston College Eagles football team =

American college football season

1929 Boston College Eagles football
- Conference: Independent
- Record: 7–2–1
- Head coach: Joe McKenney (2nd season)
- Captain: Paddy Creedon
- Home stadium: Fenway Park

1929 Eastern college football independents records
	Conf.			Overall
Team	W	L	T	W		L		T
No. 3 Pittsburgh		–		9	–	1	–	0
Colgate		–		8	–	1	–	0
Fordham		–		7	–	0	–	2
Bucknell		–		8	–	2	–	0
No. 11 Penn		–		7	–	2	–	0
Boston College		–		7	–	2	–	1
Villanova		–		7	–	2	–	1
Cornell		–		6	–	2	–	0
Tufts		–		5	–	1	–	2
Harvard		–		5	–	2	–	1
Yale		–		5	–	2	–	1
NYU		–		7	–	3	–	0
Franklin & Marshall		–		6	–	3	–	0
Penn State		–		6	–	3	–	0
Syracuse		–		6	–	3	–	0
Washington & Jefferson		–		5	–	2	–	2
Drexel		–		6	–	3	–	1
Temple		–		6	–	3	–	1
Carnegie Tech		–		5	–	3	–	1
Army		–		6	–	4	–	1
Providence		–		3	–	3	–	2
Brown		–		5	–	5	–	0
Columbia		–		4	–	5	–	0
CCNY		–		2	–	4	–	2
Princeton		–		2	–	4	–	1
Boston University		–		3	–	6	–	0
Vermont		–		2	–	7	–	0
Rankings from Dickinson System

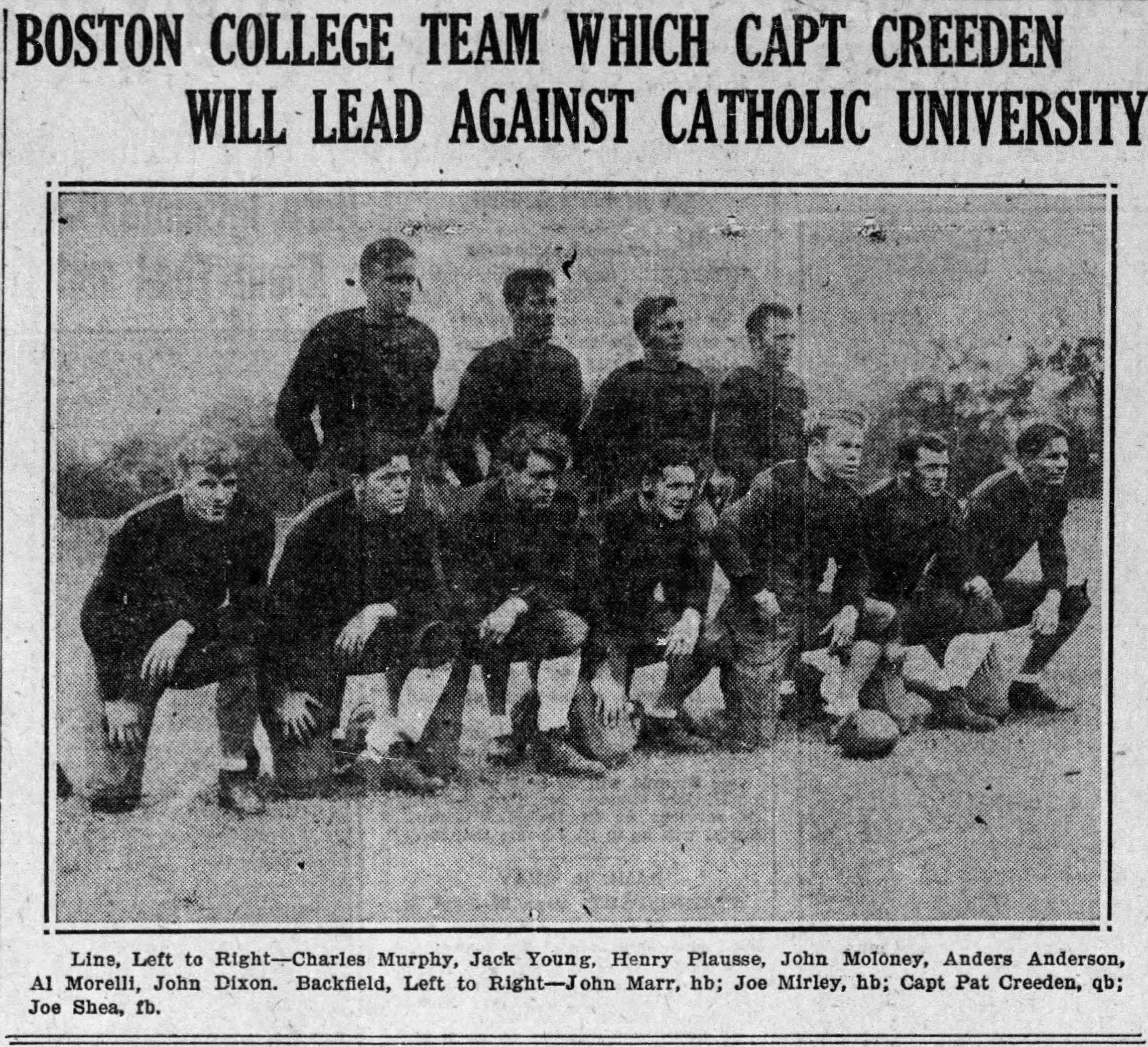
Boston College Eagles football starters against Catholic University, 1939

The 1929 Boston College Eagles football team represented Boston College as an independent during the 1929 college football season. Led by second-year head coach Joe McKenney, the Eagles compiled a record of 7–2–1.

== Schedule ==
Date	Time	Opponent	Site	Result	Attendance	Source
September 28		Catholic University	Fenway Park; Boston, MA	W 13–6		
October 5	2:00 p.m.	Maine	Fenway Park; Boston, MA	W 42–0		
October 12	2:00 p.m.	Villanova	Fenway Park; Boston, MA	T 7–7		
October 19		at Dayton	University of Dayton Stadium; Dayton, OH	W 23–7		
October 26	2:00 p.m.	Canisius	Fenway Park; Boston, MA	W 40–6		
November 2	2:00 p.m.	Duke	Fenway Park; Boston, MA	W 20–12		
November 9	2:00 p.m.	Fordham	Fenway Park; Boston, MA	L 6–7		
November 16		at Marquette	Marquette Stadium; Milwaukee, WI	L 6–20		
November 23	2:00 p.m.	Boston University	Fenway Park; Boston, MA (rivalry)	W 33–0		
November 30	1:45 p.m.	Holy Cross	Fenway Park; Boston, MA (rivalry)	W 12–0	35,000	
All times are in Eastern time
