= 1929 Cornell Big Red football team =

American college football season

1929 Cornell Big Red football
- Conference: Independent
- Record: 6–2
- Head coach: Gil Dobie (10th season)
- Offensive scheme: Single-wing
- Base defense: 6–3–2
- Captain: Sam Wakeman
- Home stadium: Schoellkopf Field

1929 Eastern college football independents records
	Conf.			Overall
Team	W	L	T	W		L		T
No. 3 Pittsburgh		–		9	–	1	–	0
Colgate		–		8	–	1	–	0
Fordham		–		7	–	0	–	2
Bucknell		–		8	–	2	–	0
No. 11 Penn		–		7	–	2	–	0
Boston College		–		7	–	2	–	1
Villanova		–		7	–	2	–	1
Cornell		–		6	–	2	–	0
Tufts		–		5	–	1	–	2
Harvard		–		5	–	2	–	1
Yale		–		5	–	2	–	1
NYU		–		7	–	3	–	0
Franklin & Marshall		–		6	–	3	–	0
Penn State		–		6	–	3	–	0
Syracuse		–		6	–	3	–	0
Washington & Jefferson		–		5	–	2	–	2
Drexel		–		6	–	3	–	1
Temple		–		6	–	3	–	1
Carnegie Tech		–		5	–	3	–	1
Army		–		6	–	4	–	1
Providence		–		3	–	3	–	2
Brown		–		5	–	5	–	0
Columbia		–		4	–	5	–	0
CCNY		–		2	–	4	–	2
Princeton		–		2	–	4	–	1
Boston University		–		3	–	6	–	0
Vermont		–		2	–	7	–	0
Rankings from Dickinson System

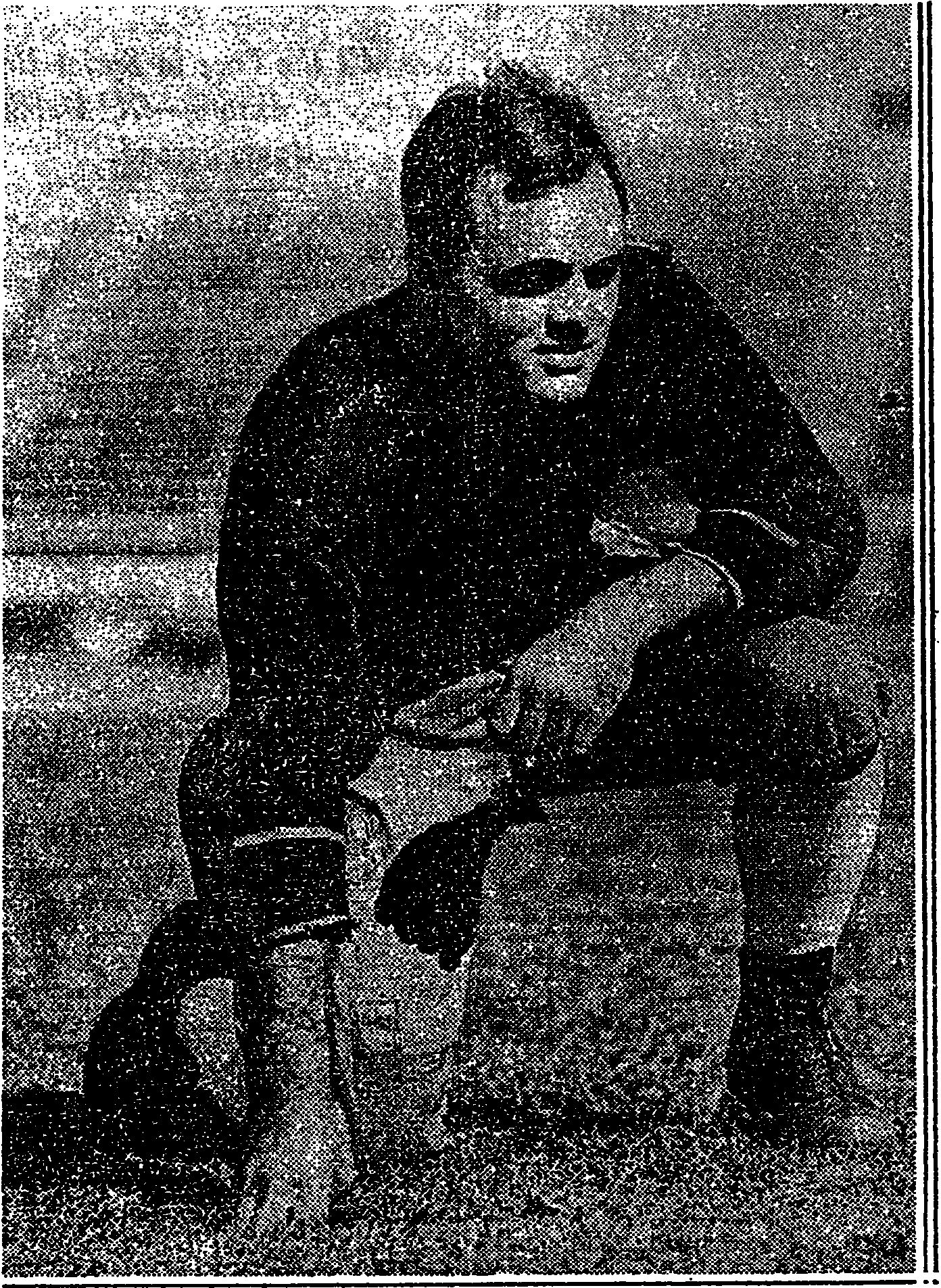
1929 photograph of Cornell Big Red football player Sam Wakeman

The 1929 Cornell Big Red football team was an American football team that represented Cornell University during the 1929 college football season. In their tenth season under head coach Gil Dobie, the Big Red compiled a 6–2 record and outscored their opponents by a combined total of 204 to 60.

== Schedule ==
Date	Opponent	Site	Result	Source
September 28	Clarkson	Schoellkopf Field; Ithaca, NY	W 60–0	
October 5	Niagara	Schoellkopf Field; Ithaca, NY	W 22–6	
October 12	Hampden–Sydney	Schoellkopf Field; Ithaca, NY	W 40–6	
October 19	Princeton	Schoellkopf Field; Ithaca, NY	W 13–7	
November 2	Columbia	Schoellkopf Field; Ithaca, NY (rivalry)	W 12–6	
November 16	Western Reserve	Schoellkopf Field; Ithaca, NY	W 36–0	
November 23	at Dartmouth	Memorial Field; Hanover, NH (rivalry)	L 14–18	
November 28	at Penn	Franklin Field; Philadelphia, PA (rivalry)	L 7–17	
