= Robert William Traip Academy =

Public high school in Kittery, Maine

Coordinates: 43°05′12″N 70°44′23″W

Robert William Traip Academy (often abbreviated as R. W. Traip Academy or simply Traip Academy) is a public high school located in Kittery, Maine. It serves the towns of Kittery and Kittery Point, Maine. It is adjacent to Portsmouth Naval Shipyard. The principal is Jaime Sawler, as of July 1, 2025.

== History ==
It was founded in 1905 as a private preparatory high school and remained as such until 1967, when it became part of the Kittery School Department. The school was built with funds from the will of the late Robert W. Traip, who died in 1864. After his last heir died in 1897, a school endowment fund was established. The school initially had an enrollment of 27 students. The Robert W. Traip Academy Trust awards scholarships for students and grants for school projects.

In 1990, the facility was updated, and the 1909 building was demolished. It is home to roughly 260 students, with each graduating class averaging 55 students. Traip's colors are blue and gold and the mascot is the Rangers. In 2020, the School Committee voted to remove the school's resource officer.

In partnership with the Wood Island Life Saving Station Association, the academy created a wooden boat building class which also teaches maritime history.

The Civil Rights Team has developed a land acknowledgment statement, honoring the school’s location on land stewarded by the Wabanaki people. The team used the South Berwick Public Library land acknowledgement as a template. In 2022, student artists were influenced by the land acknowledgement process to create a mural of the sun rising over the Atlantic in honor of Wabanaki people past and present. Local artist Julia O’Connell helped the students.

== Nutrition program ==
Breakfast and lunch are served at the high school each school day. The school has a farm-to-school program and a visiting chef program. A salad bar, funded by Salad Bars to Schools, is available every day. The school also has a garden and a greenhouse. In 2018, Washington D.C.–based Forward Food came to the school to train school nutrition staff in how to make plant-based school meals. The training has enabled the school to serve four or five vegan school meal options per day, featuring hummus veggie wraps, quesadillas with vegan cheese, veggie rice casserole, and Szechuan noodles. Buffalo cauliflower and chocolate hummus with fresh strawberries and pita bread baked with a little bit of cinnamon and sugar are very popular. The school offers avocado toast at breakfast.

== See also ==
- Town of Kittery, Maine
