= 1929 Syracuse Orangemen football team =

American college football season

1929 Syracuse Orangemen football
- Conference: Independent
- Record: 6–3
- Head coach: Lew Andreas (3rd season)
- Captain: Albert VanNess
- Home stadium: Archbold Stadium

1929 Eastern college football independents records
	Conf.			Overall
Team	W	L	T	W		L		T
No. 3 Pittsburgh		–		9	–	1	–	0
Colgate		–		8	–	1	–	0
Fordham		–		7	–	0	–	2
Bucknell		–		8	–	2	–	0
No. 11 Penn		–		7	–	2	–	0
Boston College		–		7	–	2	–	1
Villanova		–		7	–	2	–	1
Cornell		–		6	–	2	–	0
Tufts		–		5	–	1	–	2
Harvard		–		5	–	2	–	1
Yale		–		5	–	2	–	1
NYU		–		7	–	3	–	0
Franklin & Marshall		–		6	–	3	–	0
Penn State		–		6	–	3	–	0
Syracuse		–		6	–	3	–	0
Washington & Jefferson		–		5	–	2	–	2
Drexel		–		6	–	3	–	1
Temple		–		6	–	3	–	1
Carnegie Tech		–		5	–	3	–	1
Army		–		6	–	4	–	1
Providence		–		3	–	3	–	2
Brown		–		5	–	5	–	0
Columbia		–		4	–	5	–	0
CCNY		–		2	–	4	–	2
Princeton		–		2	–	4	–	1
Boston University		–		3	–	6	–	0
Vermont		–		2	–	7	–	0
Rankings from Dickinson System

The 1929 Syracuse Orangemen football team represented Syracuse University as an independent during the 1929 college football season. The Orangemen were led by third-year head coach Lew Andreas and played their home games at Archbold Stadium in Syracuse, New York. Andreas was succeeded as football coach by Vic Hanson after the season, but remained as the Syracuse basketball coach for 21 more years.

== Schedule ==
Date	Opponent	Site	Result	Attendance	Source
September 28	Hobart	Archbold Stadium; Syracuse, NY	W 77–0	25,000	
October 5	St. Lawrence	Archbold Stadium; Syracuse, NY	W 55–0	12,000	
October 12	Nebraska	Archbold Stadium; Syracuse, NY	L 6–13	20,000	
October 19	Johns Hopkins	Archbold Stadium; Syracuse, NY	W 85–6	18,000	
October 26	at Brown	Brown Stadium; Providence, RI	W 6–0		
November 2	Penn State	Archbold Stadium; Syracuse, NY (rivalry)	L 4–6	12,000	
November 9	Niagara	Archbold Stadium; Syracuse, NY	W 20–0	12,000	
November 16	Colgate	Archbold Stadium; Syracuse, NY (rivalry)	L 0–21	35,000	
November 28	at Columbia	Baker Field; New York, NY	W 6–0	20,000	
