= 1929 Army Cadets football team =

American college football season

1929 Army Cadets football
- Conference: Independent
- Record: 6–4–1
- Head coach: Biff Jones (4th season)
- Offensive scheme: Single-wing
- Captain: Chris Cagle
- Home stadium: Michie Stadium

1929 Eastern college football independents records
	Conf.			Overall
Team	W	L	T	W		L		T
No. 3 Pittsburgh		–		9	–	1	–	0
Colgate		–		8	–	1	–	0
Fordham		–		7	–	0	–	2
Bucknell		–		8	–	2	–	0
No. 11 Penn		–		7	–	2	–	0
Boston College		–		7	–	2	–	1
Villanova		–		7	–	2	–	1
Cornell		–		6	–	2	–	0
Tufts		–		5	–	1	–	2
Harvard		–		5	–	2	–	1
Yale		–		5	–	2	–	1
NYU		–		7	–	3	–	0
Franklin & Marshall		–		6	–	3	–	0
Penn State		–		6	–	3	–	0
Syracuse		–		6	–	3	–	0
Washington & Jefferson		–		5	–	2	–	2
Drexel		–		6	–	3	–	1
Temple		–		6	–	3	–	1
Carnegie Tech		–		5	–	3	–	1
Army		–		6	–	4	–	1
Providence		–		3	–	3	–	2
Brown		–		5	–	5	–	0
Columbia		–		4	–	5	–	0
CCNY		–		2	–	4	–	2
Princeton		–		2	–	4	–	1
Boston University		–		3	–	6	–	0
Vermont		–		2	–	7	–	0
Rankings from Dickinson System

The 1929 Army Cadets football team represented the United States Military Academy as an independent during the 1929 college football season. Led by head coach Biff Jones, the Cadets offense scored 276 points, while the defense allowed 132 points. The club started the season with three wins and one tie but finished with a 6–4–1 record.

The 1929 game between Army and Notre Dame had the highest attendance in the series at 79,408.

== Schedule ==
Date	Opponent	Site	Result	Attendance	Source
September 28	Boston University	Michie Stadium; West Point, NY	W 26–0		
October 5	Gettysburg	Michie Stadium; West Point, NY	W 33–7		
October 12	Davidson	Michie Stadium; West Point, NY	W 23–7		
October 19	at Harvard	Harvard Stadium; Boston, MA	T 20–20		
October 26	at Yale	Yale Bowl; New Haven, CT	L 13–21		
November 2	South Dakota	Michie Stadium; West Point, NY	W 33–6		
November 9	at Illinois	Memorial Stadium; Champaign, IL	L 7–17		
November 16	Dickinson	Michie Stadium; West Point, NY	W 89–7		
November 23	Ohio Wesleyan	Michie Stadium; West Point, NY	W 19–6		
November 30	vs. Notre Dame	Yankee Stadium; Bronx, NY (rivalry)	L 0–7	79,408–82,000	
December 28	at Stanford	Stanford Stadium; Stanford, CA	L 13–34		
