= 1929 CCNY Lavender football team =

American college football season

1929 CCNY Lavender football
- Conference: Independent
- Record: 2–4–2
- Head coach: Harold J. Parker (6th season)
- Captain: Bernie Bienstock
- Home stadium: Lewisohn Stadium

1929 Eastern college football independents records
	Conf.			Overall
Team	W	L	T	W		L		T
No. 3 Pittsburgh		–		9	–	1	–	0
Colgate		–		8	–	1	–	0
Fordham		–		7	–	0	–	2
Bucknell		–		8	–	2	–	0
No. 11 Penn		–		7	–	2	–	0
Boston College		–		7	–	2	–	1
Villanova		–		7	–	2	–	1
Cornell		–		6	–	2	–	0
Tufts		–		5	–	1	–	2
Harvard		–		5	–	2	–	1
Yale		–		5	–	2	–	1
NYU		–		7	–	3	–	0
Franklin & Marshall		–		6	–	3	–	0
Penn State		–		6	–	3	–	0
Syracuse		–		6	–	3	–	0
Washington & Jefferson		–		5	–	2	–	2
Drexel		–		6	–	3	–	1
Temple		–		6	–	3	–	1
Carnegie Tech		–		5	–	3	–	1
Army		–		6	–	4	–	1
Providence		–		3	–	3	–	2
Brown		–		5	–	5	–	0
Columbia		–		4	–	5	–	0
CCNY		–		2	–	4	–	2
Princeton		–		2	–	4	–	1
Boston University		–		3	–	6	–	0
Vermont		–		2	–	7	–	0
Rankings from Dickinson System

The 1929 CCNY Lavender football team was an American football team that represented the City College of New York (CCNY) as an independent during the 1929 college football season. In their sixth season under Harold J. Parker, the Lavender team compiled a 2–4–2 record.

== Schedule ==
Date	Opponent	Site	Result	Attendance	Source
September 28	Rider	Lewisohn Stadium; New York, NY	T 6–6	6,000	
October 5	Lowell Textile	Lewisohn Stadium; New York, NY	T 0–0		
October 12	at St. Lawrence	Weeks Field; Canton, NY	L 0–22		
October 19	at Drexel	Drexel Field; Philadelphia, PA	L 4–12		
October 26	George Washington	Lewisohn Stadium; New York, NY	W 45–0		
November 2	RPI	Lewisohn Stadium; New York, NY	W 38–7		
November 9	St. John's (NY)	Lewisohn Stadium; New York, NY	L 0–25	6,000	
November 16	Manhattan	Lewisohn Stadium; New York, NY	L 0–21	10,000	
