= 1929 Penn State Nittany Lions football team =

American college football season

1929 Penn State Nittany Lions football
- Conference: Independent
- Record: 6–3
- Head coach: Hugo Bezdek (12th season)
- Captain: Jack Martin
- Home stadium: New Beaver Field

1929 Eastern college football independents records
| | Conf. | | | Overall |
| Team | W | L | T | W | | L | | T |
|---|---|---|---|---|---|---|---|---|
| No. 3 Pittsburgh | | – | | 9 | – | 1 | – | 0 |
| Colgate | | – | | 8 | – | 1 | – | 0 |
| Fordham | | – | | 7 | – | 0 | – | 2 |
| Bucknell | | – | | 8 | – | 2 | – | 0 |
| No. 11 Penn | | – | | 7 | – | 2 | – | 0 |
| Boston College | | – | | 7 | – | 2 | – | 1 |
| Villanova | | – | | 7 | – | 2 | – | 1 |
| Cornell | | – | | 6 | – | 2 | – | 0 |
| Tufts | | – | | 5 | – | 1 | – | 2 |
| Harvard | | – | | 5 | – | 2 | – | 1 |
| Yale | | – | | 5 | – | 2 | – | 1 |
| NYU | | – | | 7 | – | 3 | – | 0 |
| Franklin & Marshall | | – | | 6 | – | 3 | – | 0 |
| Penn State | | – | | 6 | – | 3 | – | 0 |
| Syracuse | | – | | 6 | – | 3 | – | 0 |
| Washington & Jefferson | | – | | 5 | – | 2 | – | 2 |
| Drexel | | – | | 6 | – | 3 | – | 1 |
| Temple | | – | | 6 | – | 3 | – | 1 |
| Carnegie Tech | | – | | 5 | – | 3 | – | 1 |
| Army | | – | | 6 | – | 4 | – | 1 |
| Providence | | – | | 3 | – | 3 | – | 2 |
| Brown | | – | | 5 | – | 5 | – | 0 |
| Columbia | | – | | 4 | – | 5 | – | 0 |
| CCNY | | – | | 2 | – | 4 | – | 2 |
| Princeton | | – | | 2 | – | 4 | – | 1 |
| Boston University | | – | | 3 | – | 6 | – | 0 |
| Vermont | | – | | 2 | – | 7 | – | 0 |
Rankings from Dickinson System

The 1929 Penn State Nittany Lions football team represented the Pennsylvania State University as an independent during the 1929 college football season. The team was coached by Hugo Bezdek and played its home games in New Beaver Field in State College, Pennsylvania.

== Schedule ==
| Date | Opponent | Site | Result | Attendance | Source |
|---|---|---|---|---|---|
| September 28 | Niagara | New Beaver Field; State College, PA | W 16–0 | 4,000 | |
| October 5 | Lebanon Valley | New Beaver Field; State College, PA | W 15–0 | 4,000 | |
| October 12 | Marshall | New Beaver Field; State College, PA | W 26–7 | 5,000 | |
| October 19 | at NYU | Yankee Stadium; Bronx, NY | L 0–7 | 35,000 | |
| October 26 | Lafayette^{†} | New Beaver Field; State College, PA | W 6–3 | 10,000 | |
| November 2 | at Syracuse | Archbold Stadium; Syracuse, NY (rivalry) | W 6–4 | 12,000 | |
| November 9 | at Penn | Franklin Field; Philadelphia, PA | W 19–7 | 60,000 | |
| November 16 | Bucknell | New Beaver Field; State College, PA | L 6–27 | 12,000 | |
| November 28 | at Pittsburgh | Pitt Stadium; Pittsburgh, PA (rivalry) | L 7–20 | 25,755 | |
^{†}Homecoming
