= 1929 Drexel Dragons football team =

American college football season

1929 Drexel Dragons football
- Conference: Independent
- Record: 6–3–1
- Head coach: Walter Halas (3rd season)
- Captain: Leo Redmond
- Home stadium: Drexel Field

1929 Eastern college football independents records
	Conf.			Overall
Team	W	L	T	W		L		T
No. 3 Pittsburgh		–		9	–	1	–	0
Colgate		–		8	–	1	–	0
Fordham		–		7	–	0	–	2
Bucknell		–		8	–	2	–	0
No. 11 Penn		–		7	–	2	–	0
Boston College		–		7	–	2	–	1
Villanova		–		7	–	2	–	1
Cornell		–		6	–	2	–	0
Tufts		–		5	–	1	–	2
Harvard		–		5	–	2	–	1
Yale		–		5	–	2	–	1
NYU		–		7	–	3	–	0
Franklin & Marshall		–		6	–	3	–	0
Penn State		–		6	–	3	–	0
Syracuse		–		6	–	3	–	0
Washington & Jefferson		–		5	–	2	–	2
Drexel		–		6	–	3	–	1
Temple		–		6	–	3	–	1
Carnegie Tech		–		5	–	3	–	1
Army		–		6	–	4	–	1
Providence		–		3	–	3	–	2
Brown		–		5	–	5	–	0
Columbia		–		4	–	5	–	0
CCNY		–		2	–	4	–	2
Princeton		–		2	–	4	–	1
Boston University		–		3	–	6	–	0
Vermont		–		2	–	7	–	0
Rankings from Dickinson System

1929 Drexel Dragons football team represented Drexel Institute—now known as Drexel University—in the 1929 college football season. Led by Walter Halas in his third season as head coach, the team compiled a record of 6–3–1.

== Schedule ==
Date	Time	Opponent	Site	Result	Attendance	Source
September 21		West Chester	Philadelphia, PA	L 0–12		
September 28		at Swarthmore	Swarthmore, PA	L 8–14		
October 5		St. John's	Philadelphia, PA	L 7–12		
October 12		at Juniata	Huntingdon, PA	W 19–0		
October 19		CCNY	Drexel Field; Philadelphia, PA	W 12–4	3,000	
October 26	2:00 pm	at Susquehanna	Selinsgrove, PA	W 13–0		
November 2		Washington College	Philadelphia, PA	W 7–0		
November 9		at Delaware	Frazer Field; Newark, DE	W 21–6		
November 16		Haverford	Drexel Field; Philadelphia, PA	W 7–0		
November 23		at Saint Joseph's	Philadelphia, PA	T 0–0	7,500	
All times are in Eastern time

== Roster ==
1929 Drexel Dragons football team roster
Players
Coaches
Offense

Pos.	#	Name	Class
[[American football positions|]]		Grow
[[American football positions|]]		Sax
[[American football positions|]]		Redinger
[[American football positions|]]		Holt
[[American football positions|]]		Revak
[[American football positions|]]		Guggenheim
[[American football positions|]]		Kirshner
[[American football positions|]]		Rumora
[[American football positions|]]		Potter
[[American football positions|]]		Kearns
[[American football positions|]]		Perry
[[American football positions|]]		Barr
[[American football positions|]]		Walt McFayden	So
[[American football positions|]]		Heckman
HB		Leo Redmond (injured) (C)
[[American football positions|]]		Mike LaBove	So
[[American football positions|]]		Cardoni
[[American football positions|]]		Hughes
[[American football positions|]]		Crowthers
[[American football positions|]]		Snyder
[[American football positions|]]		Markle
[[American football positions|]]		Gabriel
[[American football positions|]]		Perrepatto
[[American football positions|]]		Marsh
[[American football positions|]]		Scatchard
[[American football positions|]]		Grace
[[American football positions|]]		Keller
[[American football positions|]]		Heist
[[American football positions|]]		Pitman
[[American football positions|]]		Baggerman
[[American football positions|]]		D. Redmond
[[American football positions|]]		Miller
[[American football positions|]]		Lentz
[[American football positions|]]		Wright
[[American football positions|]]		Kelly

Defense

Pos.	#	Name	Class

Special teams

Pos.	#	Name	Class

Head coach

- Walter Halas (Illinois)

Coordinators/assistant coaches

- Albert H. Repscha (Maine)
- Kirkpatrick

Legend

- (C) Team captain
- (S) Suspended
- (I) Ineligible
- Injured
- Redshirt
