= 1929 Princeton Tigers football team =

American college football season

1929 Princeton Tigers football
- Conference: Independent
- Record: 2–4–1
- Head coach: Bill Roper (16th season)
- Captain: John K. Whyte Jr.
- Home stadium: Palmer Stadium

1929 Eastern college football independents records
	Conf.			Overall
Team	W	L	T	W		L		T
No. 3 Pittsburgh		–		9	–	1	–	0
Colgate		–		8	–	1	–	0
Fordham		–		7	–	0	–	2
Bucknell		–		8	–	2	–	0
No. 11 Penn		–		7	–	2	–	0
Boston College		–		7	–	2	–	1
Villanova		–		7	–	2	–	1
Cornell		–		6	–	2	–	0
Tufts		–		5	–	1	–	2
Harvard		–		5	–	2	–	1
Yale		–		5	–	2	–	1
NYU		–		7	–	3	–	0
Franklin & Marshall		–		6	–	3	–	0
Penn State		–		6	–	3	–	0
Syracuse		–		6	–	3	–	0
Washington & Jefferson		–		5	–	2	–	2
Drexel		–		6	–	3	–	1
Temple		–		6	–	3	–	1
Carnegie Tech		–		5	–	3	–	1
Army		–		6	–	4	–	1
Providence		–		3	–	3	–	2
Brown		–		5	–	5	–	0
Columbia		–		4	–	5	–	0
CCNY		–		2	–	4	–	2
Princeton		–		2	–	4	–	1
Boston University		–		3	–	6	–	0
Vermont		–		2	–	7	–	0
Rankings from Dickinson System

The 1929 Princeton Tigers football team represented Princeton University in the 1929 college football season. In their 16th year under head coach Bill Roper, the Tigers compiled a 2–4–1 record and were outscored by 67 to 66.

No Princeton players were selected as first-team honorees on the 1929 All-America college football team or the 1929 All-Eastern football team.

== Schedule ==
Date	Opponent	Site	Result	Attendance	Source
October 5	Amherst	Palmer Stadium; Princeton, NJ	W 7–0		
October 12	Brown	Palmer Stadium; Princeton, NJ	L 12–13		
October 19	at Cornell	Schoellkopf Field; Ithaca, NY	L 7–13		
October 26	Navy	Palmer Stadium; Princeton, NJ	T 13–13		
November 2	Chicago	Palmer Stadium; Princeton, NJ	L 7–15		
November 9	Lehigh	Palmer Stadium; Princeton, NJ	W 20–0		
November 16	at Yale	Yale Bowl; New Haven, CT (rivalry)	L 0–13		
