= 1929 Vermont Catamounts football team =

American college football season

1929 Vermont Catamounts football
- Conference: Independent
- Record: 2–7
- Head coach: William V. Rattan (2nd season)
- Home stadium: Centennial Field

1929 Eastern college football independents records
	Conf.			Overall
Team	W	L	T	W		L		T
No. 3 Pittsburgh		–		9	–	1	–	0
Colgate		–		8	–	1	–	0
Fordham		–		7	–	0	–	2
Bucknell		–		8	–	2	–	0
No. 11 Penn		–		7	–	2	–	0
Boston College		–		7	–	2	–	1
Villanova		–		7	–	2	–	1
Cornell		–		6	–	2	–	0
Tufts		–		5	–	1	–	2
Harvard		–		5	–	2	–	1
Yale		–		5	–	2	–	1
NYU		–		7	–	3	–	0
Franklin & Marshall		–		6	–	3	–	0
Penn State		–		6	–	3	–	0
Syracuse		–		6	–	3	–	0
Washington & Jefferson		–		5	–	2	–	2
Drexel		–		6	–	3	–	1
Temple		–		6	–	3	–	1
Carnegie Tech		–		5	–	3	–	1
Army		–		6	–	4	–	1
Providence		–		3	–	3	–	2
Brown		–		5	–	5	–	0
Columbia		–		4	–	5	–	0
CCNY		–		2	–	4	–	2
Princeton		–		2	–	4	–	1
Boston University		–		3	–	6	–	0
Vermont		–		2	–	7	–	0
Rankings from Dickinson System

The 1929 Vermont Catamounts football team was an American football team that represented the University of Vermont as an independent during the 1929 college football season. In their second year under head coach William V. Rattan, the team compiled a 2–7 record.

== Schedule ==
Date	Time	Opponent	Site	Result	Attendance	Source
September 28		at NYU	Ohio Field; Bronx, NY	L 0–77	15,000	
October 5		at Yale	Yale Bowl; New Haven, CT	L 0–89	20,000	
October 12	2:30 p.m.	at Boston University	Nickerson Field; Weston, MA	L 6–27		
October 19		Union (NY)	Centennial Field; Burlington, VT	W 13–7		
October 26		at Norwich	Sabine Field; Northfield, VT	L 0–20		
November 2		at Connecticut	Gardner Dow Athletic Fields; Storrs, CT	L 0–34		
November 9		RPI	Centennial Field; Burlington, VT	W 12–7		
November 16		Middlebury	Centennial Field; Burlington, VT	L 0–19		
November 28		at Springfield (MA)	Pratt Field; Springfield, MA	L 0–20		
All times are in Eastern time
