= 1929 Villanova Wildcats football team =

American college football season

1929 Villanova Wildcats football
- Conference: Independent
- Record: 7–2–1
- Head coach: Harry Stuhldreher (5th season)
- Captain: Edward Melanson
- Home stadium: Villanova Stadium

1929 Eastern college football independents records
	Conf.			Overall
Team	W	L	T	W		L		T
No. 3 Pittsburgh		–		9	–	1	–	0
Colgate		–		8	–	1	–	0
Fordham		–		7	–	0	–	2
Bucknell		–		8	–	2	–	0
No. 11 Penn		–		7	–	2	–	0
Boston College		–		7	–	2	–	1
Villanova		–		7	–	2	–	1
Cornell		–		6	–	2	–	0
Tufts		–		5	–	1	–	2
Harvard		–		5	–	2	–	1
Yale		–		5	–	2	–	1
NYU		–		7	–	3	–	0
Franklin & Marshall		–		6	–	3	–	0
Penn State		–		6	–	3	–	0
Syracuse		–		6	–	3	–	0
Washington & Jefferson		–		5	–	2	–	2
Drexel		–		6	–	3	–	1
Temple		–		6	–	3	–	1
Carnegie Tech		–		5	–	3	–	1
Army		–		6	–	4	–	1
Providence		–		3	–	3	–	2
Brown		–		5	–	5	–	0
Columbia		–		4	–	5	–	0
CCNY		–		2	–	4	–	2
Princeton		–		2	–	4	–	1
Boston University		–		3	–	6	–	0
Vermont		–		2	–	7	–	0
Rankings from Dickinson System

The 1929 Villanova Wildcats football team represented the Villanova University during the 1929 college football season. The head coach was Harry Stuhldreher, coaching his fifth season with the Wildcats. The team played their home games at Villanova Stadium in Villanova, Pennsylvania.

== Schedule ==
Date	Time	Opponent	Site	Result	Attendance	Source
September 26		Lebanon Valley	Villanova Stadium; Villanova, PA	W 32–13		
October 5		Loyola (MD)	Villanova Stadium; Villanova, PA	W 16–7		
October 12	2:00 p.m.	at Boston College	Fenway Park; Boston, MA	T 7–7		
October 19		Catholic University	Villanova Stadium; Villanova, PA	W 12–0		
October 26		Duke	Villanova Stadium; Villanova, PA	W 58–12		
November 2		Oglethorpe	Villanova Stadium; Villanova, PA	W 17–7	10,000	
November 9		vs. Bucknell	Scranton, PA	L 0–9		
November 16		Davis & Elkins	Franklin Field; Philadelphia, PA	L 6–12		
November 23		NC State	Franklin Field; Philadelphia, PA	W 24–6	8,000	
November 30		at Temple	Temple Stadium; Philadelphia, PA	W 15–0	12,000	
