= 1929 Penn Quakers football team =

American college football season

1929 Penn Quakers football
- Conference: Independent
- Record: 7–2
- Head coach: Lou Young (7th season)
- Captain: John Utz
- Home stadium: Franklin Field

1929 Eastern college football independents records
	Conf.			Overall
Team	W	L	T	W		L		T
No. 3 Pittsburgh		–		9	–	1	–	0
Colgate		–		8	–	1	–	0
Fordham		–		7	–	0	–	2
Bucknell		–		8	–	2	–	0
No. 11 Penn		–		7	–	2	–	0
Boston College		–		7	–	2	–	1
Villanova		–		7	–	2	–	1
Cornell		–		6	–	2	–	0
Tufts		–		5	–	1	–	2
Harvard		–		5	–	2	–	1
Yale		–		5	–	2	–	1
NYU		–		7	–	3	–	0
Franklin & Marshall		–		6	–	3	–	0
Penn State		–		6	–	3	–	0
Syracuse		–		6	–	3	–	0
Washington & Jefferson		–		5	–	2	–	2
Drexel		–		6	–	3	–	1
Temple		–		6	–	3	–	1
Carnegie Tech		–		5	–	3	–	1
Army		–		6	–	4	–	1
Providence		–		3	–	3	–	2
Brown		–		5	–	5	–	0
Columbia		–		4	–	5	–	0
CCNY		–		2	–	4	–	2
Princeton		–		2	–	4	–	1
Boston University		–		3	–	6	–	0
Vermont		–		2	–	7	–	0
Rankings from Dickinson System

The 1929 Penn Quakers football team was an American football team that represented the University of Pennsylvania as an independent during the 1929 college football season. In their seventh and last season under head coach Lou Young, the Quakers compiled a 7–2 record and outscored opponents by a total of 116 to 68. The team played its home games at Franklin Field in Philadelphia.

== Schedule ==
Date	Opponent	Site	Result	Attendance	Source
September 28	Franklin & Marshall	Franklin Field; Philadelphia, PA	W 14–7		
October 5	Swarthmore	Franklin Field; Philadelphia, PA	W 20–6		
October 12	VPI	Franklin Field; Philadelphia, PA	W 14–8		
October 19	California	Franklin Field; Philadelphia, PA	L 7–12		
October 26	Lehigh	Franklin Field; Philadelphia, PA	W 10–7		
November 2	Navy	Franklin Field; Philadelphia, PA	W 7–2		
November 9	Penn State	Franklin Field; Philadelphia, PA	L 7–19	60,000	
November 16	at Columbia	Baker Field; New York, NY	W 20–0	30,000	
November 28	Cornell	Franklin Field; Philadelphia, PA (rivalry)	W 17–7		
