= 1929 Colgate football team =

American college football season

1929 Colgate football
- Conference: Independent
- Record: 8–1
- Head coach: Andrew Kerr (1st season)
- Captain: John Cox
- Home stadium: Whitnall Field

1929 Eastern college football independents records
	Conf.			Overall
Team	W	L	T	W		L		T
No. 3 Pittsburgh		–		9	–	1	–	0
Colgate		–		8	–	1	–	0
Fordham		–		7	–	0	–	2
Bucknell		–		8	–	2	–	0
No. 11 Penn		–		7	–	2	–	0
Boston College		–		7	–	2	–	1
Villanova		–		7	–	2	–	1
Cornell		–		6	–	2	–	0
Tufts		–		5	–	1	–	2
Harvard		–		5	–	2	–	1
Yale		–		5	–	2	–	1
NYU		–		7	–	3	–	0
Franklin & Marshall		–		6	–	3	–	0
Penn State		–		6	–	3	–	0
Syracuse		–		6	–	3	–	0
Washington & Jefferson		–		5	–	2	–	2
Drexel		–		6	–	3	–	1
Temple		–		6	–	3	–	1
Carnegie Tech		–		5	–	3	–	1
Army		–		6	–	4	–	1
Providence		–		3	–	3	–	2
Brown		–		5	–	5	–	0
Columbia		–		4	–	5	–	0
CCNY		–		2	–	4	–	2
Princeton		–		2	–	4	–	1
Boston University		–		3	–	6	–	0
Vermont		–		2	–	7	–	0
Rankings from Dickinson System

The 1929 Colgate football team was an American football team that represented Colgate University as an independent during the 1929 college football season. In its first season under head coach Andrew Kerr, the team compiled an 8–1 record, shut out seven of nine opponents, and outscored all opponents by a total of 315 to 19. The team played a national schedule, including victories over Michigan State (31–0), Indiana (21–6), Columbia (33–0), and Syracuse (21–0), and suffered its only loss on the road at Wisconsin (6–13).

Kerr was hired as Colgate's head coach in April 1929, after three seasons as head coach at Washington & Jefferson. He was inducted into the College Football Hall of Fame in 1951.

Three Colgate players received significant postseason awards:

- Guard Bob Gillson was selected by the New York Post as a second-team player on the 1929 All-America team. He also received second-team honors from the Associated Press (AP) on the 1929 All-Eastern football team.
- Tackle Bud Huntington received second-team All-America honors from the New York Sun.
- Halfback Leslie Hart received second-team All-Eastern honors from the AP.
- Center John Cox received second-team All-Eastern honors from the Newspaper Enterprise Association (NEA). Cox was also the team captain.

The team played its home games on Whitnall Field in Hamilton, New York.

== Schedule ==
Date	Opponent	Site	Result	Attendance	Source
September 28	St. Lawrence	Whitnall Field; Hamilton, NY	W 59–0		
October 5	at Wisconsin	Camp Randall Stadium; Madison, WI	L 6–13		
October 12	Michigan State	Whitnall Field; Hamilton, NY	W 31–0		
October 19	at Indiana	Memorial Stadium; Bloomington, IN	W 21–6		
October 26	Providence	Whitnall Field; Hamilton, NY	W 52–0	5,000	
November 2	Hampden–Sydney	Whitnall Field; Hamilton, NY	W 60–0		
November 9	at Columbia	Baker Field; New York, NY	W 33–0		
November 16	at Syracuse	Archbold Stadium; Syracuse, NY (rivalry)	W 21–0	35,000	
November 30	at Brown	Andrews Field; Providence, RI	W 32–0		
