= 1929 Carnegie Tech Tartans football team =

American college football season

1929 Carnegie Tech Tartans football
- Conference: Independent
- Record: 5–3–1
- Head coach: Walter Steffen (15th season)
- Home stadium: Forbes Field

1929 Eastern college football independents records
	Conf.			Overall
Team	W	L	T	W		L		T
No. 3 Pittsburgh		–		9	–	1	–	0
Colgate		–		8	–	1	–	0
Fordham		–		7	–	0	–	2
Bucknell		–		8	–	2	–	0
No. 11 Penn		–		7	–	2	–	0
Boston College		–		7	–	2	–	1
Villanova		–		7	–	2	–	1
Cornell		–		6	–	2	–	0
Tufts		–		5	–	1	–	2
Harvard		–		5	–	2	–	1
Yale		–		5	–	2	–	1
NYU		–		7	–	3	–	0
Franklin & Marshall		–		6	–	3	–	0
Penn State		–		6	–	3	–	0
Syracuse		–		6	–	3	–	0
Washington & Jefferson		–		5	–	2	–	2
Drexel		–		6	–	3	–	1
Temple		–		6	–	3	–	1
Carnegie Tech		–		5	–	3	–	1
Army		–		6	–	4	–	1
Providence		–		3	–	3	–	2
Brown		–		5	–	5	–	0
Columbia		–		4	–	5	–	0
CCNY		–		2	–	4	–	2
Princeton		–		2	–	4	–	1
Boston University		–		3	–	6	–	0
Vermont		–		2	–	7	–	0
Rankings from Dickinson System

The 1929 Carnegie Tech Tartans football team represented the Carnegie Institute of Technology (now known as Carnegie Mellon University) in the 1929 college football season. In Walter Steffen's 15th year as head coach, the Tartans compiled a 5–3–1 record, and outscored their opponents 145 to 92. Carnegie Tech played a tough schedule, facing two recognized national champions, Notre Dame (consensus) and Pittsburgh (Davis), along with a 10–2 USC team. They shut out three opponents, were shut out once, and played Washington & Jefferson to a scoreless tie.

== Schedule ==
Date	Time	Opponent	Site	Result	Attendance	Source
October 5		Bethany (WV)	Forbes Field; Pittsburgh, PA	W 21–0		
October 12		Thiel	Forbes Field; Pittsburgh, PA	W 26–0		
October 19		Washington & Jefferson	College Field; Washington, PA	T 0–0		
October 26		Notre Dame	Forbes Field; Pittsburgh, PA	L 0–7	65,000–66,000	
November 2	3:00 p.m.	at Washington University	Francis Field (Missouri); St. Louis, MO	W 19–0	6,000	
November 9		at Western Reserve	League Park; Cleveland, OH	W 33–6		
November 16		at Pittsburgh	Pitt Stadium; Pittsburgh, PA	L 13–34		
November 28		at NYU	Yankee Stadium; Bronx, NY	W 20–0	55,000	
December 14		at USC	Los Angeles Memorial Coliseum; Los Angeles, CA	L 13–45	65,000	
All times are in Eastern time
