= 1929 Bucknell Bison football team =

American college football season

1929 Bucknell Bison football
- Conference: Independent
- Record: 8–2
- Head coach: Carl Snavely (3rd season)
- Home stadium: Memorial Stadium

1929 Eastern college football independents records
	Conf.			Overall
Team	W	L	T	W		L		T
No. 3 Pittsburgh		–		9	–	1	–	0
Colgate		–		8	–	1	–	0
Fordham		–		7	–	0	–	2
Bucknell		–		8	–	2	–	0
No. 11 Penn		–		7	–	2	–	0
Boston College		–		7	–	2	–	1
Villanova		–		7	–	2	–	1
Cornell		–		6	–	2	–	0
Tufts		–		5	–	1	–	2
Harvard		–		5	–	2	–	1
Yale		–		5	–	2	–	1
NYU		–		7	–	3	–	0
Franklin & Marshall		–		6	–	3	–	0
Penn State		–		6	–	3	–	0
Syracuse		–		6	–	3	–	0
Washington & Jefferson		–		5	–	2	–	2
Drexel		–		6	–	3	–	1
Temple		–		6	–	3	–	1
Carnegie Tech		–		5	–	3	–	1
Army		–		6	–	4	–	1
Providence		–		3	–	3	–	2
Brown		–		5	–	5	–	0
Columbia		–		4	–	5	–	0
CCNY		–		2	–	4	–	2
Princeton		–		2	–	4	–	1
Boston University		–		3	–	6	–	0
Vermont		–		2	–	7	–	0
Rankings from Dickinson System

The 1929 Bucknell Bison football team was an American football team that represented Bucknell University as an independent during the 1929 college football season. In its third season under head coach Carl Snavely, the team compiled an 8–2 record.

The team played its home games at Memorial Stadium in Lewisburg, Pennsylvania.

== Schedule ==
Date	Opponent	Site	Result	Attendance	Source
September 28	St. Thomas (PA)	Memorial Stadium; Lewisburg, PA	W 31–0		
October 5	at Albright	Reading, PA	W 33–0		
October 12	Washington & Jefferson^{†}	Memorial Stadium; Lewisburg, PA	L 6–14		
October 19	at Lafayette	Fisher Field; Easton, PA	W 6–3		
October 26	Gettysburg	Memorial Stadium; Lewisburg, PA	W 33–0		
November 2	at Temple	Temple Stadium; Philadelphia, PA	W 13–0	15,000	
November 9	vs. Villanova	Scranton, PA	W 9–0		
November 16	at Penn State	New Beaver Field; State College, PA	W 27–6	12,000	
November 23	at Fordham	Polo Grounds; New York, NY	L 0–14	35,000	
November 29	Dickinson	Memorial Stadium; Lewisburg, PA	W 78–0		
^{†}Homecoming
