= 1929 Washington & Jefferson Presidents football team =

American college football season

1929 Washington & Jefferson Presidents football
- Conference: Independent
- Record: 5–2–2
- Head coach: Bill Amos (1st season)

1929 Eastern college football independents records
	Conf.			Overall
Team	W	L	T	W		L		T
No. 3 Pittsburgh		–		9	–	1	–	0
Colgate		–		8	–	1	–	0
Fordham		–		7	–	0	–	2
Bucknell		–		8	–	2	–	0
No. 11 Penn		–		7	–	2	–	0
Boston College		–		7	–	2	–	1
Villanova		–		7	–	2	–	1
Cornell		–		6	–	2	–	0
Tufts		–		5	–	1	–	2
Harvard		–		5	–	2	–	1
Yale		–		5	–	2	–	1
NYU		–		7	–	3	–	0
Franklin & Marshall		–		6	–	3	–	0
Penn State		–		6	–	3	–	0
Syracuse		–		6	–	3	–	0
Washington & Jefferson		–		5	–	2	–	2
Drexel		–		6	–	3	–	1
Temple		–		6	–	3	–	1
Carnegie Tech		–		5	–	3	–	1
Army		–		6	–	4	–	1
Providence		–		3	–	3	–	2
Brown		–		5	–	5	–	0
Columbia		–		4	–	5	–	0
CCNY		–		2	–	4	–	2
Princeton		–		2	–	4	–	1
Boston University		–		3	–	6	–	0
Vermont		–		2	–	7	–	0
Rankings from Dickinson System

The 1929 Washington & Jefferson Presidents football team was an American football team that represented Washington & Jefferson College as an independent during the 1929 college football season. The team compiled a 5–2–2 record and outscored opponents by a total of 142 to 33. Bill Amos was the head coach.

== Schedule ==
Date	Opponent	Site	Result	Attendance	Source
September 28	Ohio Northern	Washington, PA	W 33–0		
October 5	Ashland	Washington, PA	W 60–0		
October 12	at Bucknell	Memorial Stadium; Lewisburg, PA	W 14–6		
October 19	Carnegie Tech	Washington, PA	T 0–0		
October 26	at Temple	Temple Stadium; Philadelphia, PA	T 0–0	20,000	
November 2	Lafayette	Washington, PA	W 20–0		
November 9	at Pittsburgh	Pitt Stadium; Pittsburgh, PA	L 0–21	30,000	
November 16	Wittenberg	Washington, PA	W 15–0		
November 28	at West Virginia	Mountaineer Field; Morgantown, WV	L 0–6	15,000	
