= 1929 NYU Violets football team =

American college football season

1929 NYU Violets football
- Conference: Independent
- Record: 7–3
- Head coach: Chick Meehan (5th season)
- Home stadium: Ohio Field; Polo Grounds; Yankee Stadium

1929 Eastern college football independents records
	Conf.			Overall
Team	W	L	T	W		L		T
No. 3 Pittsburgh		–		9	–	1	–	0
Colgate		–		8	–	1	–	0
Fordham		–		7	–	0	–	2
Bucknell		–		8	–	2	–	0
No. 11 Penn		–		7	–	2	–	0
Boston College		–		7	–	2	–	1
Villanova		–		7	–	2	–	1
Cornell		–		6	–	2	–	0
Tufts		–		5	–	1	–	2
Harvard		–		5	–	2	–	1
Yale		–		5	–	2	–	1
NYU		–		7	–	3	–	0
Franklin & Marshall		–		6	–	3	–	0
Penn State		–		6	–	3	–	0
Syracuse		–		6	–	3	–	0
Washington & Jefferson		–		5	–	2	–	2
Drexel		–		6	–	3	–	1
Temple		–		6	–	3	–	1
Carnegie Tech		–		5	–	3	–	1
Army		–		6	–	4	–	1
Providence		–		3	–	3	–	2
Brown		–		5	–	5	–	0
Columbia		–		4	–	5	–	0
CCNY		–		2	–	4	–	2
Princeton		–		2	–	4	–	1
Boston University		–		3	–	6	–	0
Vermont		–		2	–	7	–	0
Rankings from Dickinson System

The 1929 NYU Violets football team was an American football team that represented New York University as an independent during the 1929 college football season. In their fifth year under head coach Chick Meehan, the team compiled a 7–3 record. Prior to the start of the season, halfback Edwin "Dutch" Hill accidentally shot and killed himself when he took a police officer's gun away from him as a practical joke.

== Schedule ==
Date	Opponent	Site	Result	Attendance	Source
September 28	Vermont	Ohio Field; Bronx, NY	W 77–0	15,000	
October 5	West Virginia Wesleyan	Polo Grounds; New York, NY	W 26–0	35,000	
October 12	at Fordham	Polo Grounds; New York, NY	L 0–26	57,000	
October 19	Penn State	Yankee Stadium; Bronx, NY	W 7–0	35,000	
October 26	Butler	Yankee Stadium; Bronx, NY	W 13–6	25,000	
November 2	Georgetown	Yankee Stadium; Bronx, NY	L 0–14	50,000	
November 9	Georgia	Yankee Stadium; Bronx, NY	W 27–19	42,000	
November 16	Missouri	Yankee Stadium; Bronx, NY	W 14–0	40,000	
November 23	Rutgers	Yankee Stadium; Bronx, NY	W 20–7	15,000	
November 28	Carnegie Tech	Yankee Stadium; Bronx, NY	L 0–20	55,000	
