= 1929 Temple Owls football team =

American college football season

1929 Temple Owls football
- Conference: Independent
- Record: 6–3–1
- Head coach: Heinie Miller (5th season)
- Captain: Grover Wearshing
- Home stadium: Temple Stadium

1929 Eastern college football independents records
	Conf.			Overall
Team	W	L	T	W		L		T
No. 3 Pittsburgh		–		9	–	1	–	0
Colgate		–		8	–	1	–	0
Fordham		–		7	–	0	–	2
Bucknell		–		8	–	2	–	0
No. 11 Penn		–		7	–	2	–	0
Boston College		–		7	–	2	–	1
Villanova		–		7	–	2	–	1
Cornell		–		6	–	2	–	0
Tufts		–		5	–	1	–	2
Harvard		–		5	–	2	–	1
Yale		–		5	–	2	–	1
NYU		–		7	–	3	–	0
Franklin & Marshall		–		6	–	3	–	0
Penn State		–		6	–	3	–	0
Syracuse		–		6	–	3	–	0
Washington & Jefferson		–		5	–	2	–	2
Drexel		–		6	–	3	–	1
Temple		–		6	–	3	–	1
Carnegie Tech		–		5	–	3	–	1
Army		–		6	–	4	–	1
Providence		–		3	–	3	–	2
Brown		–		5	–	5	–	0
Columbia		–		4	–	5	–	0
CCNY		–		2	–	4	–	2
Princeton		–		2	–	4	–	1
Boston University		–		3	–	6	–	0
Vermont		–		2	–	7	–	0
Rankings from Dickinson System

The 1929 Temple Owls football team was an American football team that represented Temple University as an independent during the 1929 college football season. In its fifth season under head coach Heinie Miller, the team compiled a 6–3–1 record and shut out six of its ten opponents. The team played its home games at Temple Stadium in Philadelphia.

== Schedule ==
Date	Opponent	Site	Result	Attendance	Source
September 28	Thiel	Temple Stadium; Philadelphia, PA	W 25–0	15,000	
October 5	St. Thomas (PA)	Temple Stadium; Philadelphia, PA	W 20–0		
October 12	St. Bonaventure	Temple Stadium; Philadelphia, PA	W 28–0	20,000	
October 19	vs. Western Maryland	Baltimore Stadium; Baltimore, MD	L 0–23	10,000	
October 26	Washington & Jefferson	Temple Stadium; Philadelphia, PA	T 0–0	20,000	
November 2	Bucknell	Temple Stadium; Philadelphia, PA	L 0–13	15,000	
November 9	Gallaudet	Temple Stadium; Philadelphia, PA	W 31–0	5,000	
November 16	Lafayette	Temple Stadium; Philadelphia, PA	W 13–0		
November 23	Drake	Temple Stadium; Philadelphia, PA	W 16–14		
November 30	Villanova	Temple Stadium; Philadelphia, PA	L 0–15	12,000	
