= List of Louisiana Tech Bulldogs football seasons =

The Louisiana Tech Bulldogs college football team competes in the National Collegiate Athletic Association (NCAA) Division I Football Bowl Subdivision, representing Louisiana Tech University in Conference USA. Louisiana Tech has played their home games at Joe Aillet Stadium in Ruston, Louisiana since 1968. Since Louisiana Tech's first season in 1901, the Bulldogs lay claim to three National Championships, 25 conference championships, two conference division championships, 13 bowl berths, and four undefeated, untied seasons. As of the 2024 regular season, the Louisiana Tech football program has posted 645 all-time wins and an all-time winning percentage of .559. Currently, the Bulldogs are coached by Sonny Cumbie.

== Seasons ==
Official record as of December 8, 2024.

Legend

^{†} National Champions
^{‡} Conference Champions
^{#} Division Champions
^ Division I-A bowl game berth
* Non-Division I-A postseason berth

Season	Coach	Conference	Season results				Bowl/Playoff result	Final ranking
Season	Coach	Conference	Conference finish	Wins	Losses	Ties	Bowl/Playoff result	NCAA Poll
Louisiana Tech Bulldogs
1901	Edwin Barber	Independent	—	0	2	0	—	—
1902 (Note: While 3 games are recorded as having been played, the NCAA does not recognize the 1902 season in its records. As such, this season does not count towards the final record.)	Frank Singleton	Independent	—	1	1	1	—	—
1903 (Note: The game against Monroe YMCA this season is not recognized by the NCAA.)	W. M. Robb	Independent	—	0	1	0	—	—
1904	E. G. Pierce	Independent	—	1	3	0	—	—
1905	J. U. Bragg	Independent	—	0	1	0	—	—
1906	Zack T. Young	Independent	—	2	1	3	—	—
1907	George L. Watkins	Independent	—	9	1	0	—	—
1908	A. L. Cornell	Independent	—	4	3	1	—	—
1909	Percy S. Prince	Independent	—	4	1	0	—	—
1910	Percy S. Prince	Independent	—	7	0	0	—	—
1911	Percy S. Prince	Independent	—	4	2	1	—	—
1912	Percy S. Prince	Independent	—	1	2	1	—	—
1913	Percy S. Prince	Independent	—	3	4	1	—	—
1914	Percy S. Prince	Independent	—	2	4	0	—	—
1915^{‡}	Percy S. Prince	LIAA	1st	3	1	2	—	—
1916	A. Flack	LIAA	2nd	2	4	0	—	—
1917	V. S. Pugh	LIAA	T—3rd	2	3	0	—	—
1918	Percy S. Prince	LIAA	Louisiana Tech did not field a football team for the 1918 season due to World War I					
1919 (Note: 3 games are listed according to Louisiana Tech, but the NCAA recognizes only 2 games.)	Percy S. Prince	LIAA	4th	0	2	0	—	—
1920	R. Foster Clark	LIAA	2nd	5	1	0	—	—
1921^{‡}	R. Foster Clark	LIAA	1st	6	0	0	—	—
1922	William H. Dietz	LIAA	N/A	5	1	1	—	—
1923	William H. Dietz	LIAA	N/A	6	2	0	—	—
1924	Phillip Arbuckle	LIAA	N/A	1	6	1	—	—
1925	R.C. Kenney	SIAA	N/A	1	6	2	—	—
1926	Hugh E. Wilson	SIAA	N/A	5	2	2	—	—
1927	Hugh E. Wilson	SIAA	N/A	3	5	0	—	—
1928	Tod Rockwell	SIAA	N/A	2	7	0	—	—
1929 (Note: The game vs Millsaps this season ended in a 6-6 draw, but is recorded as a 6-0 win according to both Louisiana Tech and the NCAA.)	Tod Rockwell	SIAA	N/A	4	4	2	—	—
1930	George Bohler	SIAA	N/A	3	6	0	—	—
1931	George Bohler	SIAA	N/A	7	0	0	—	—
1932	George Bohler	SIAA	N/A	4	4	0	—	—
1933	George Bohler	SIAA	N/A	1	7	0	—	—
1934	Eddie McLane	SIAA	N/A	4	6	0	—	—
1935	Eddie McLane	SIAA	N/A	8	1	0	—	—
1936	Eddie McLane	SIAA	N/A	6	2	1	—	—
1937	Eddie McLane	SIAA	N/A	6	3	2	—	—
1938	Eddie McLane	SIAA	N/A	3	7	1	—	—
1939	Ray E. Davis	LIC	N/A	5	6	0	—	—
1940	Joe Aillet	LIC	N/A	6	4	0	—	—
1941^{‡}	Joe Aillet	LIC	1st	5	4	1	—	—
1942	Joe Aillet	LIC	N/A	6	3	0	—	—
1943	Joe Aillet	LIC	Louisiana Tech did not field a football team for the 1943 season due to World War II					
1944	Joe Aillet	LIC	N/A	3	5	1	—	—
1945^{‡}	Joe Aillet	LIC	1st	6	4	0	—	—
1946	Joe Aillet	LIC	N/A	7	3	0	—	—
1947^{‡}	Joe Aillet	LIC	1st	5	4	0	—	—
1948	Joe Aillet	Gulf States	N/A	7	2	1	—	—
1949^{‡}	Joe Aillet	Gulf States	1st	7	2	0	—	—
1950	Joe Aillet	Gulf States	N/A	5	4	1	—	—
1951 (Note: The NCAA incorrectly lists this season ending with a 5-4 record.)	Joe Aillet	Gulf States	N/A	4	5	0	—	—
1952^{‡}	Joe Aillet	Gulf States	T—1st	6	1	2	—	—
1953^{‡}	Joe Aillet	Gulf States	T—1st	6	3	0	—	—
1954	Joe Aillet	Gulf States	N/A	6	3	0	—	—
1955^{‡}	Joe Aillet	Gulf States	1st	9	1	0	—	—
1956	Joe Aillet	Gulf States	N/A	4	3	2	—	—
1957^{‡}	Joe Aillet	Gulf States	T—1st	6	4	0	—	—
1958^{‡}	Joe Aillet	Gulf States	T—1st	7	3	0	—	—
1959^{‡}	Joe Aillet	Gulf States	1st	9	1	0	—	—
1960^{‡}	Joe Aillet	Gulf States	T—1st	8	2	0	—	—
1961	Joe Aillet	Gulf States	N/A	5	4	0	—	—
1962	Joe Aillet	Gulf States	N/A	4	4	0	—	—
1963	Joe Aillet	Gulf States	N/A	6	3	0	—	—
1964^{‡}	Joe Aillet	Gulf States	1st	9	1	0	—	—
1965	Joe Aillet	Gulf States	3rd	4	4	0	—	—
1966	Joe Aillet	Gulf States	T—5th	1	9	0	—	—
1967	Maxie Lambright	Gulf States	6th	3	7	0	—	—
1968*	Maxie Lambright	Gulf States	T—2nd	9	2	0	Won Grantland Rice Bowl vs. Akron, 33-13	—
1969^{‡}*	Maxie Lambright	Gulf States	1st	8	2	0	Lost Grantland Rice Bowl vs. East Tennessee State, 14-34	—
1970	Maxie Lambright	Gulf States	6th	2	8	0	—	—
1971^{‡}*	Maxie Lambright	Southland	1st	9	2	0	Won Pioneer Bowl vs. Eastern Michigan, 14-3	—
1972^{†‡}*	Maxie Lambright	Southland	1st	12	0	0	Won Grantland Rice Bowl vs. Tennessee Tech, 35-0	—
1973^{†‡}*	Maxie Lambright	Southland	1st	12	1	0	Won NCAA Division II Quarterfinal vs. Western Illinois, 18-13; Won Pioneer Bowl vs. Boise State, 38-34; Won Camellia Bowl vs. Western Kentucky, 34-0	—
1974^{†‡}*	Maxie Lambright	Southland	1st	11	1	0	Won NCAA Division II Quarterfinal vs. Western Carolina, 10-7; Lost Pioneer Bowl vs. Central Michigan, 14-35	—
1975	Maxie Lambright	Southland	2nd	8	2	0	—	—
1976	Maxie Lambright	Southland	T—4th	6	5	0	—	—
1977^{‡}^	Maxie Lambright	Southland	1st	9	1	2	Won Independence Bowl vs. Louisville, 24-14	—
1978^{‡}^	Maxie Lambright	Southland	1st	6	5	0	Lost Independence Bowl vs. East Carolina, 13-35	—
1979 (Note: New Mexico later forfeited a 34-0 win, although the NCAA record is unchanged.)	Larry Beightol (Note: Pat Patterson served as interim head coach for the final game of the 1979 season, a 13–10 win vs. Northeast Louisiana.)	Southland	T—4th	3	8	0	—	—
1980	Billy Brewer	Southland	4th	5	6	0	—	—
1981	Billy Brewer	Southland	4th	4	6	1	—	—
1982^{‡}*	Billy Brewer	Southland	1st	10	3	0	Won NCAA Division I-AA Quarterfinal vs. South Carolina State, 38-3; Lost NCAA Division I-AA Semifinal vs. Delaware, 0-17	2
1983	A.L. Williams	Southland	T—5th	4	7	0	—	—
1984^{‡}*	A.L. Williams	Southland	1st	10	5	0	Won NCAA Division I-AA First Round vs. Mississippi Valley State, 66-19; Won NCAA Division I-AA Quarterfinal vs. Alcorn State, 44-21; Won NCAA Division I-AA Semifinal vs. Middle Tennessee State, 21-13; Lost NCAA Division I-AA Championship vs. Montana State, 6-19	9
1985	A.L. Williams	Southland	T—2nd	8	3	0	—	14
1986	A.L. Williams	Southland	T—2nd	6	4	1	—	—
1987	Carl Torbush	Independent	—	3	8	0	—	—
1988	Joe Peace	Independent	—	4	7	0	—	—
1989	Joe Peace	Independent	—	5	4	1	—	—
1990^	Joe Peace	Independent	—	8	3	1	Tied Independence Bowl vs. Maryland, 34-34	—
1991	Joe Peace	Independent	—	8	1	2	—	—
1992	Joe Peace	Independent	—	5	6	0	—	—
1993 (Note: Alabama later forfeited a 56-3 win, although the NCAA record is unchanged.)	Joe Peace	Big West	T—6th	3	8	0	—	—
1994	Joe Peace	Big West	9th	3	8	0	—	—
1995	Joe Peace	Big West	T—8th	5	6	0	—	—
1996	Gary Crowton	Independent	—	6	5	—	—	—
1997	Gary Crowton	Independent	—	9	2	—	—	—
1998 (Note: Texas A&M later forfeited a 28-7 due to using an ineligible player, although the NCAA record is unchanged.)	Gary Crowton	Independent	—	6	6	—	—	—
1999	Jack Bicknell	Independent	—	8	3	—	—	—
2000	Jack Bicknell	Independent	—	3	9	—	—	—
2001^{‡}^	Jack Bicknell	WAC	1st	7	5	—	Lost Humanitarian Bowl vs. Clemson, 24-49	—
2002	Jack Bicknell	WAC	T—6th	4	8	—	—	—
2003	Jack Bicknell	WAC	7th	5	7	—	—	—
2004	Jack Bicknell	WAC	T–3rd	6	6	—	—	—
2005	Jack Bicknell	WAC	T—3rd	7	4	—	—	—
2006	Jack Bicknell	WAC	T—8th	3	10	—	—	—
2007	Derek Dooley	WAC	T—4th	5	7	—	—	—
2008^	Derek Dooley	WAC	T—2nd	8	5	—	Won Independence Bowl vs. Northern Illinois, 17-10	—
2009	Derek Dooley	WAC	T—5th	4	8	—	—	—
2010	Sonny Dykes	WAC	5th	5	7	—	—	—
2011^{‡}^	Sonny Dykes	WAC	1st	8	5	—	Lost Poinsettia Bowl vs. TCU, 24-31	—
2012	Sonny Dykes	WAC	3rd	9	3	—	—	—
2013	Skip Holtz	C-USA	5th (West)	4	8	—	—	—
2014^{#}^	Skip Holtz	C-USA	1st (West)	9	5	—	Won Heart of Dallas Bowl vs. Illinois, 35-18	—
2015^	Skip Holtz	C-USA	2nd (West)	9	4	—	Won New Orleans Bowl vs. Arkansas State, 47-28	—
2016^{#}^	Skip Holtz	C-USA	1st (West)	9	5	—	Won Armed Forces Bowl vs. Navy, 48-45	—
2017^	Skip Holtz	C-USA	4th (West)	7	6	—	Won Frisco Bowl vs. SMU, 51-10	—
2018^	Skip Holtz	C-USA	T–2nd (West)	8	5	—	Won Hawaii Bowl vs. Hawaii, 31-14	—
2019^	Skip Holtz	C-USA	T–1st (West)	10	3	—	Won Independence Bowl vs. Miami (FL), 14-0	—
2020^	Skip Holtz	C-USA	3rd (West)	5	5	—	Lost New Orleans Bowl vs. Georgia Southern, 38-3	—
2021	Skip Holtz	C-USA	7th (West)	3	9	—	—	—
2022	Sonny Cumbie	C-USA	T–9th	3	9	—	—	—
2023	Sonny Cumbie	C-USA	T–6th	3	9	—	—	—
2024^	Sonny Cumbie	C-USA	5th	5	8	—	Lost Independence Bowl vs. Army, 27-6	—
2025	Sonny Cumbie	C-USA	T–4th	8	5	—	Won Independence Bowl vs. Army, 23–14	—
Total				637	500	36	(only includes regular season games)	
Total				9	4	1	(only includes Division I-A bowl games; 15 appearances)	
Total				11	4	0	(only includes Non-Division I-A postseason games; 15 appearances)	
Total				654	508	37	(all games)	
