= 1916 Louisiana Industrial football team =

American college football season

1916 Louisiana Industrial football
- Conference: Louisiana Intercollegiate Athletic Association
- Record: 2–4 (1–1 LIAA)
- Head coach: A. Flack (1st season)
- Captain: Dewitt Milam

The 1916 Louisiana Industrial football team was an American football team that represented the Louisiana Industrial Institute—now known as Louisiana Tech University—as a member of the Louisiana Intercollegiate Athletic Association (LIAA) during the 1916 college football season. Led by A. Flack in his first and only season as head coach, Louisiana Industrial compiled an overall record of 2–4. Dewitt Milam was the team's captain.

== Schedule ==
Date	Time	Opponent	Site	Result	Attendance	Source
October 23		vs. Ouachita Baptist*	Hope, AR	W 10–6	1,500	
October 27		Henderson-Brown*	Ruston, LA	L 0–14		
November 4		vs. Louisiana Normal	State Fair Grounds; Shreveport, LA (rivalry)	W 24–0		
November 10		at Mississippi College*	Clinton, MS	L 0–47		
November 18		Southwestern Louisiana Industrial	Ruston, LA (rivalry)	L 0–26		
November 30	2:30 p.m.	at Hendrix*	Russell Field; Conway, AR	L 6–7		
*Non-conference game; All times are in Central time
