= 1919 Louisiana Industrial football team =

American college football season

1919 Louisiana Industrial football
- Conference: Louisiana Intercollegiate Athletic Association
- Record: 0–3 (0–1 LIAA)
- Head coach: Percy S. Prince (8th season)

The 1919 Louisiana Industrial football team was an American football team that represented the Louisiana Industrial Institute—now known as Louisiana Tech University—as a member of the Louisiana Intercollegiate Athletic Association (LIAA) during the 1919 college football season. Led by Percy S. Prince, who returned for his eighth and final season as head coach after helming the team from 1909 to 1915, Louisiana Industrial compiled an overall record of 0–3.

== Schedule ==
Date	Opponent	Site	Result	Source
October 31	Henderson-Brown*	Ruston, LA	L 7–14	
November 8	Louisiana Normal	Ruston, LA (rivalry)	L 0–27	
November 27	at Arkansas A&M*	Magnolia, AR	L 6–7	
*Non-conference game
