= 1920 Louisiana Industrial football team =

American college football season

1920 Louisiana Industrial football
- Conference: Louisiana Intercollegiate Athletic Association
- Record: 5–1 (1–1 LIAA)
- Head coach: R. Foster Clark (1st season)
- Captain: Bob Seegers

The 1920 Louisiana Industrial football team was an American football team that represented the Louisiana Industrial Institute—now known as Louisiana Tech University—as a member of the Louisiana Intercollegiate Athletic Association (LIAA) during the 1920 college football season. Led by first-year head coach R. Foster Clark, Louisiana Industrial compiled an overall record of 5–1. Bob Seegers was the team's captain.

== Schedule ==
Date	Opponent	Site	Result	Source
	Arkansas A&M*	Ruston, LA	W 3–0	
	St. Charles (LA)*	Ruston, LA	W 13–7	
October 30	Southwestern Louisiana	Ruston, LA (rivalry)	W 1–0	
November 5	Louisiana Normal	Ruston, LA (rivalry)	L 0–12	
November 11	at Louisiana College*	Pineville, LA	W 14–0	
	Louisiana College*	Ruston, LA	W 7–0	
*Non-conference game
