= 1923 Louisiana Tech Bulldogs football team =

American college football season

1923 Louisiana Tech Bulldogs football
- Conference: Louisiana Intercollegiate Athletic Association
- Record: 6–2 (2–1 LIAA)
- Head coach: William Henry Dietz (2nd season)
- Captain: Roe Hollis

The 1923 Louisiana Tech Bulldogs football team was an American football team that represented the Louisiana Polytechnic Institute—now known as Louisiana Tech University—as a member of the Louisiana Intercollegiate Athletic Association (LIAA) during the 1923 college football season. Led by William Henry Dietz in his second and final year as head coach, Louisiana Tech compiled an overall record of 6–2. The team's captain was Roe Hollis.

== Schedule ==
Date	Opponent	Site	Result	Attendance	Source
October 6	Little Rock*	Ruston, LA	W 26–0		
October 12	at Henderson-Brown*	Arkadelphia, AR	W 7–3		
October 20	at Tulane*	Tulane Stadium; New Orleans, LA	L 7–13		
October 27	Millsaps*	Ruston, LA	W 20–0		
November 3	at Louisiana College	Alexandria, LA	W 40–7		
November 10	Louisiana Normal	L. P. I. Field; Ruston, LA (rivalry)	W 66–7		
November 17	Loyola (LA)*	Ruston, LA	W 28–6		
November 29	at Centenary	Centenary Stadium; Shreveport, LA	L 0–27	5,000	
*Non-conference game
