= 1921 Centenary Gentlemen football team =

American college football season

1921 Centenary Gentlemen football
- Conference: Louisiana Intercollegiate Athletic Association
- Record: 3–3 (1–2 LIAA)
- Head coach: Homer Norton (3rd season)
- Home stadium: Gasser Park

The 1921 Centenary Gentlemen football team was an American football team that represented the Centenary College of Louisiana as a member of the Louisiana Intercollegiate Athletic Association (LIAA) during the 1921 college football season. In their third year under head coach Homer Norton, the Gentlemen compiled an overall record of 3–3 with a mark of 1–2 in conference play.

== Schedule ==
| Date | Opponent | Site | Result | Source |
|---|---|---|---|---|
| October 14 | at St. Charles (LA)* | Grand Coteau, LA | L 0–28 | |
| October 22 | Magnolia A&M* | Gasser Park; Shreveport, LA | Canceled | |
| October 29 | Louisiana Normal | Louisiana State Fairgrounds; Shreveport, LA | L 0–7 | |
| November 4 | at Louisiana College | Alumni Field; Pineville, LA | W 7–6 | |
| November 11 | Marshall (TX)* | Gasser Park; Shreveport, LA | W 34–0 | |
| November 19 | Millsaps* | Gasser Park; Shreveport, LA | W 21–7 | |
| November 24 | Louisiana Tech | Gasser Park; Shreveport, LA | L 7–14 | |
*Non-conference game
