= 1920 Southwestern Louisiana Industrial football team =

American college football season

1920 Southwestern Louisiana Industrial football
- Conference: Louisiana Intercollegiate Athletic Association
- Record: 2–8 ( LIAA)
- Head coach: Herbert O. Tudor (1st season)
- Home stadium: Girard Field

The 1920 Southwestern Louisiana Industrial football team was an American football team that represented the Southwestern Louisiana Industrial Institute (now known as the University of Louisiana at Lafayette) in the Louisiana Intercollegiate Athletic Association during the 1920 college football season. In their only year under head coach Herbert O. Tudor, the team compiled a 2–8 record.

== Schedule ==
Date	Opponent	Site	Result	Source
September 25	Abbeville High School*	Girard Field; Lafayette, LA	W 34–0	
October 2	at Tulane*	New Orleans, LA	L 0–79	
October 9	Patterson High School*	Girard Field; Lafayette, LA	L 13–14	
October 16	LSU JV*	Girard Field; Lafayette, LA	L 0–13	
October 23	Louisiana College	Girard Field; Lafayette, LA	W 22–14	
October 30	at Louisiana Industrial	Ruston, LA	L 7–6 (Forfeit)	
November 6	at Louisiana College	Pineville, LA	L 0–14	
November 11	at Spring Hill*	Monroe Park; Mobile, AL	L 7–42	
November 18	at St. Charles (LA)	Grand Coteau, LA	L 7–35	
November 25	at Louisiana Normal	Normal Athletic Park; Natchitoches, LA	L 0–20	
*Non-conference game
