= Herbert O. Tudor =

American football player and coach

Biographical details
- Education: Kansas (1914)

Playing career
- 1912–1913: Kansas
- Position: Guard

Coaching career (HC unless noted)
- 1915: Parsons
- 1920: Southwestern Louisiana Industrial

Administrative career (AD unless noted)
- 1915–1916: Parsons

Head coaching record
- Overall: 6–12

Herbert O. Tudor was an American college football player and coach and athletics administrator. He served as the head football coach and athletic director at Parsons College in Fairfield, Iowa in 1915 and later as the head football coach at the University of Louisiana at Lafayette–then known as Southwest Louisiana Institute–in 1920.

Tudor was a graduate of the University of Kansas, where he lettered in football in 1912 and 1913.

== Head coaching record ==
| Year | Team | Overall | Conference | Standing | Bowl/playoffs |
|---|---|---|---|---|---|
Parsons (Independent) (1915)
| 1915 | Parsons | 4–4 | | | |
| Parsons: | | 4–4 | | | |
Southwestern Louisiana Industrial (Louisiana Intercollegiate Athletic Association) (1920)
| 1920 | Southwestern Louisiana Industrial | 2–8 | | | |
| Southwestern Louisiana Industrial: | | 2–8 | | | |
| Total: | | 2–8 | | | |
