= 1915 Louisiana Industrial football team =

American college football season

1915 Louisiana Industrial football

LIAA champion
- Conference: Louisiana Intercollegiate Athletic Association
- Record: 3–1–2 (2–0–1 LIAA)
- Head coach: Percy S. Prince (7th season)

The 1915 Louisiana Industrial football team was an American football team that represented the Louisiana Industrial Institute—now known as Louisiana Tech University—as a member of the Louisiana Intercollegiate Athletic Association (LIAA) during the 1915 college football season. Led by seventh-year head coach Percy S. Prince, Louisiana Industrial compiled an overall record of 3–1–2.

== Schedule ==
Date	Time	Opponent	Site	Result	Source
October 9		Louisiana College	Ruston, LA	W 40–0	
October 15		at Ouachita Baptist*	Arkadelphia, AR	L 0–19	
October 30		Henderson-Brown*	Ruston, LA	W 43–3	
November 6	2:00 p.m.	vs. Louisiana Normal	State Fair Grounds; Shreveport, LA (rivalry)	W 20–7	
November 13		Southwestern Louisiana Industrial	Ruston, LA (rivalry)	T 7–7	
November 20		Mississippi College*	Ruston, LA	T 0–0	
*Non-conference game; All times are in Central time
