= R. Foster Clark =

American football and baseball coach

Coaching career (HC unless noted)

Football
- 1920–1921: Louisiana Industrial/Tech

Baseball
- 1921–1922: Louisiana Industrial/Tech

Head coaching record
- Overall: 11–1 (football); 17–3–1 (baseball)

Accomplishments and honors

Championships
- Football; 1 LIAA (1921)

R. Foster Clark was an American football and baseball coach at Louisiana Polytechnic Institute—now known as Louisiana Tech University. Clark has the highest winning percentage of any football and baseball head coach in Louisiana Tech history. A native of Indiana, Clark led the 1921 Louisiana Tech football team to an undefeated season and the Louisiana Intercollegiate Athletic Association (LIAA) title.

== Head coaching record ==
=== Football ===
| Year | Team | Overall | Conference | Standing | Bowl/playoffs |
|---|---|---|---|---|---|
Louisiana Industrial/Tech (Louisiana Intercollegiate Athletic Association) (1920–1921)
| 1920 | Louisiana Industrial | 5–1 | 1–1 | | |
| 1921 | Louisiana Tech | 6–0 | 3–0 | 1st | |
| Louisiana Industrial/Tech: | | 11–1 | 4–1 | | |
| Total: | | 11–1 | | | |

=== Baseball ===
Record table
| Season | Team | Overall | Conference | Standing | Postseason |
|---|---|---|---|---|---|
Louisiana Industrial/Tech () (1921–1922)
| 1921 | Louisiana Industrial | | | | |
| 1922 | Louisiana Tech | 17–3–1 | | | |
| Louisiana Industrial/Tech: | | 17–3–1 | | | |
| Total: | | 17–3–1 | | | |
