= 1923 Centenary Gentlemen football team =

American college football season

1923 Centenary Gentlemen football

LIAA champion
- Conference: Louisiana Intercollegiate Athletic Association
- Record: 10–1 (3–0 LIAA)
- Head coach: Bo McMillin (2nd season)

The 1923 Centenary Gentlemen football team represented the Centenary College of Louisiana as a member of the Louisiana Intercollegiate Athletic Association (LIAA) during the 1923 college football season. Led by second-year head coach Bo McMillin, the Gentlemen compiled an overall record of 10–2.

== Schedule ==
Date	Time	Opponent	Site	Result	Attendance	Source
September 22		at Southwestern Louisiana	Girard Field; Lafayette, LA	W 35–0		
September 29		Henderson-Brown*	Centenary Athletic Field; Shreveport, LA	W 40–3	3,500	
October 6		Chattanooga*	Centenary Athletic Field; Shreveport, LA	W 46–7		
October 12		at Hendrix*	Young Memorial Stadium; Conway, AR	W 31–13	4,000	
October 20		Louisiana Normal	Louisiana State Fairgrounds; Shreveport, LA	W 46–0		
October 27	3:00 p.m.	at TCU*	Panther Park; Fort Worth, TX	W 23–0		
November 3		Western Kentucky State Normal*	Centenary Athletic Field; Shreveport, LA	W 75–6		
November 10		at Boston College*	Braves Field; Boston, MA	L 0–14	23,000	
November 17		Southwestern (TX)*	Centenary Athletic Field; Shreveport, LA	W 34–0		
November 24		at Oglethorpe*	Grant Field; Atlanta, GA	W 14–0		
November 29		Louisiana Tech	Centenary Athletic Field; Shreveport, LA	W 27–0	5,000	
*Non-conference game; All times are in Central time
