= Percy S. Prince =

American football, basketball, and baseball coach

Biographical details
- Born: April 7, 1882; Salem, Massachusetts, U.S.
- Died: December 12, 1930 (aged 48); Wilmington, Delaware, U.S.

Coaching career (HC unless noted)

Football
- 1907: Tufts (assistant)
- 1909–1915: Louisiana Industrial
- 1919: Louisiana Industrial

Basketball
- 1909–1911: Louisiana Industrial
- 1920–1923: St. Stephen's

Baseball
- 1910: Louisiana Industrial
- 1922: St. Stephen's

Administrative career (AD unless noted)
- 1909–1920: Louisiana Industrial
- 1923–1925: Louisiana Tech

Head coaching record
- Overall: 24–16–5 (football); 5–5 (basketball); 14–4 (baseball)

Accomplishments and honors

Championships
- Football; 1 LIAA (1915)
- Military career
- Allegiance: United States of America
- Branch: United States Army
- Rank: Major
- Units: 39th Infantry Division; 1st Louisiana Infantry Regiment
- Commands: Supply Company
- Conflicts: World War I (France)

Percy S. Prince (April 7, 1882 – December 12, 1930) was an American football, basketball, and baseball coach at the Louisiana Industrial Institute—now known as Louisiana Tech University—and St. Stephen's College—now known as Bard College.

Prince graduated from Tufts University in 1906 and served as an assistant football coach at Tufts in 1907. He became the head football coach at Louisiana Industrial in 1909 and coached the football team through the 1915 season in which Louisiana Industrial won the Louisiana Intercollegiate Athletic Association (LIAA) championship, the program's first conference title. Prince also coached the Louisiana Industrial baseball team in 1910, tallying a mark of 14–4.

With the United States engaged in World War I, Prince left coaching to serve as a captain in the 1st Regiment of Infantry with headquarters at Monroe under Colonel Frank P. Stubbs Jr. Prince served as the Supply Company Commander. After his regiment landed in Brest, France, on September 3, 1918, Prince's regiment became part of the 39th Infantry Regiment and was eventually reorganized as the 156th Infantry Regiment. They were finally assigned to a training camp near Saint Florent. Prince was promoted from captain to major.

After the conclusion of the war, Prince returned to Ruston to coach the Louisiana Industrial football team for the 1919 season. His career football record at Louisiana Industria was 24–16–5.

In 1920, Prince moved to Annandale-on-Hudson, New York, to coach basketball and base at St. Stephen's College, which has since changed its name to Bard College. He left St. Stephen's in 1923.

Prince was born in Salem, Massachusetts. He died on December 12, 1930, at Delaware Hospital in Wilmington, Delaware.

== Head coaching record ==
=== Football ===
Year	Team	Overall	Conference	Standing	Bowl/playoffs
Louisiana Industrial (Independent) (1909–1914)
1909	Louisiana Industrial	4–1			
1910	Louisiana Industrial	7–0			
1911	Louisiana Industrial	4–1–1			
1912	Louisiana Industrial	1–2–1			
1913	Louisiana Industrial	3–4–1			
1914	Louisiana Industrial	2–4			
Louisiana Industrial (Louisiana Intercollegiate Athletic Association) (1915)
1915	Louisiana Industrial	3–1–2	2–0–1	1st	
Louisiana Industrial (Louisiana Intercollegiate Athletic Association) (1919)
1919	Louisiana Industrial	0–3	0–1	4th	
Louisiana Industrial:		24–16–5	2–1–1		
Total:		24–16–5			
National championship Conference title Conference division title or championship game berth

=== Basketball ===
Record table
Season	Team	Overall	Conference	Standing	Postseason
St. Stephen's () (1920–1923)
1920–21	St. Stephen's	1–2			
1921–22	St. Stephen's	2–3			
1922–23	St. Stephen's	2–0			
St. Stephen's:		5–5			
Total:		5–5			

=== Baseball ===
Record table
Season	Team	Overall	Conference	Standing	Postseason
Louisiana Industrial () (1910)
1910	Louisiana Industrial	14–4			
Louisiana Industrial:		14–4			
St. Stephen's () (1922)
1922	St. Stephen's				
St. Stephen's:					
Total:					

== See also ==
- List of college football head coaches with non-consecutive tenure
