= 1921 Louisiana Tech football team =

American college football season

1921 Louisiana Tech football

LIAA champion
- Conference: Louisiana Intercollegiate Athletic Association
- Record: 6–0 (3–0 LIAA)
- Head coach: R. Foster Clark (2nd season)
- Captain: Roe Hollis

The 1921 Louisiana Tech football team was an American football team that represented the Louisiana Polytechnic Institute—now known as Louisiana Tech University—as a member of the Louisiana Intercollegiate Athletic Association (LIAA) during the 1921 college football season. Led by R. Foster Clark in his second and final year as head coach, Louisiana Tech compiled an overall record of 6–0. Roe Hollis was the team's captain.

== Schedule ==
Date	Opponent	Site	Result	Source
October 21	Arkansas–Monticello*	Ruston, LA	W 13–0	
October 28	at Magnolia A&M*	Magnolia, AR	W 20–13	
November 4	Ouachita Baptist*	Ruston, LA	W 20–0	
November 11	Southwestern Louisiana	Ruston, LA (rivalry)	W 20–0	
November 19	Louisiana Normal	Ruston, LA (rivalry)	W 15–0	
November 24	at Centenary	Gasser Park; Shreveport, LA	W 14–7	
*Non-conference game
