= Maxie Lambright =

American football player and coach (1924–1980)

Biographical details
- Born: June 23, 1924; McComb, Mississippi, U.S.
- Died: January 28, 1980 (aged 55); Ruston, Louisiana, U.S.

Playing career
- 1946–1948: Mississippi Southern

Coaching career (HC unless noted)
- 1955: Winona SS (MS)
- 1956–1958: Bolton HS (LA)
- 1959–1966: Mississippi Southern / Southern Miss (OB)
- 1967–1978: Louisiana Tech

Administrative career (AD unless noted)
- 1970–1978: Louisiana Tech

Head coaching record
- Overall: 95–36–2 (college)
- Bowls: 6–3
- Tournaments: 4–1 (NCAA D-II playoffs)

Accomplishments and honors

Championships
- 3 NCAA Division II (1972–1974); 1 GSC (1969); 6 SLC: (1971–1974, 1977–1978)

Awards
- University of Southern Mississippi Sports Hall of Fame (1974); Louisiana Tech Athletic Hall of Fame (1984); Louisiana Sports Hall of Fame (1986)

Maxie Thomas Lambright (June 23, 1924 – January 28, 1980) was an American football coach and college athletics administrator. He served as the head coach of the Louisiana Tech Bulldogs football team from 1967 to 1978 and the Louisiana Tech University athletic director from 1970 to 1978. He led Louisiana Tech to three Division II National Championships and seven conference championships. Lambright coached the legendary quarterback Terry Bradshaw. Lambright played college football at Southern Miss from 1946 to 1948 and graduated in 1949 from the University of Southern Mississippi in Hattiesburg, Mississippi.

Lambright is a member of the Louisiana Tech Athletic Hall of Fame, Louisiana Sports Hall of Fame, and the University of Southern Mississippi Sports Hall of Fame (Class of 1974).

Lambright died on January 28, 1980, in Ruston, Louisiana, after a stroke at his home the day prior.

== Head coaching record ==
=== College ===
| Year | Team | Overall | Conference | Standing | Bowl/playoffs |
|---|---|---|---|---|---|
Louisiana Tech Bulldogs (Gulf States Conference) (1967–1970)
| 1967 | Louisiana Tech | 3–7 | 0–5 | 6th | |
| 1968 | Louisiana Tech | 9–2 | 3–2 | T–2nd | W Grantland Rice |
| 1969 | Louisiana Tech | 8–2 | 5–0 | 1st | L Grantland Rice |
| 1970 | Louisiana Tech | 2–8 | 0–5 | 6th | |
Louisiana Tech Bulldogs (Southland Conference) (1971–1978)
| 1971 | Louisiana Tech | 9–2 | 4–1 | 1st | W Pioneer |
| 1972 | Louisiana Tech | 12–0 | 5–0 | 1st | W Grantland Rice |
| 1973 | Louisiana Tech | 12–1 | 5–0 | 1st | W Pioneer, W Camellia |
| 1974 | Louisiana Tech | 11–1 | 5–0 | 1st | L Pioneer |
| 1975 | Louisiana Tech | 8–2 | 4–1 | 2nd | |
| 1976 | Louisiana Tech | 6–5 | 2–3 | T–4th | |
| 1977 | Louisiana Tech | 9–1–2 | 4–0–1 | 1st | W Independence |
| 1978 | Louisiana Tech | 6–5 | 4–1 | 1st | L Independence |
| Louisiana Tech: | | 95–36–2 | 41–18–1 | | |
| Total: | | 95–36–2 | | | |
National championship Conference title Conference division title or championship game berth
