= 1972 Grantland Rice Bowl =

- NCAA Mideast College Championship
- 1972 Program cover
Louisiana Tech Bulldogs	Tennessee Tech Golden Eagles
(11–0)	(10–1)
Southland Conference	Ohio Valley Conference
35	0
Head coach: Maxie Lambright	Head coach: Don Wade
	1	2	3	4	Total
Louisiana Tech	7	21	7	0	35
Tennessee Tech	0	0	0	0	0
- Date: December 9, 1972
- Season: 1972
- Stadium: BREC Memorial Stadium
- Location: Baton Rouge, Louisiana
- MVP: QB Denny Duron, La. Tech (Offensive); LB Joe McNeely, La. Tech (Defensive)
- Attendance: 10,300

The 1972 Grantland Rice Bowl was an NCAA College Division game following the 1972 season, between the Louisiana Tech Bulldogs and the Tennessee Tech Golden Eagles. Louisiana Tech quarterback Denny Duron was named outstanding offensive player, while his teammate linebacker Joe McNeely was named outstanding defensive player.

== Notable participants ==
Louisiana Tech wide receiver Roger Carr was selected in the 1974 NFL draft, while defensive end Fred Dean and running back Roland Harper were selected in the 1975 NFL draft, and tight end Mike Barber was selected in the 1976 NFL draft. Carr, Dean, Harper, Barber, and Joe McNeely are inductees of their university's athletic hall of fame, as is head coach Maxie Lambright. Dean is an inductee of both the College Football Hall of Fame and the Pro Football Hall of Fame.

Tennessee Tech linebackers Jim Youngblood and Mike Hennigan were selected in the 1973 NFL draft. Youngblood, Hennigan, defensive back John Fitzpatrick, and guard Howard Cochran are inductees of their university's sports hall of fame, as is head coach Don Wade. Youngblood is an inductee of the College Football Hall of Fame.

== Scoring summary ==
Scoring summary

Quarter	Time	Drive			Team	Scoring information	Score	
Quarter	Time	Plays	Yards	TOP	Team	Scoring information	La. Tech	TTU
1	2:00	6	58		La. Tech	Eric Johnson 24-yard touchdown reception from Denny Duron, Danny Norris kick good	7	0
2	8:30				La. Tech	Interception returned 31 yards for touchdown by Joe McNeely, Danny Norris kick good	14	0
2	3:44		59		La. Tech	Glen Berteau 2-yard touchdown run, Danny Norris kick good	21	0
2	2:01	1	29		La. Tech	Roger Carr 29-yard touchdown reception from Denny Duron, Danny Norris kick good	28	0
3	11:16		63		La. Tech	Glen Berteau 21-yard touchdown run, Danny Norris kick good	35	0
"TOP" = time of possession. For other American football terms, see Glossary of American football.							35	0

=== Statistics ===
	1	2	3	4	Total
Bulldogs	7	21	7	0	35
Golden Eagles	0	0	0	0	0

Statistics	La. Tech	TTU
First downs	16	4
Total offense, yards	375	94
Rushes-yards (net)	36–100	51–65
Passing yards (net)	275	29
Passes, Comp-Att-Int	15–32–4	2–9–2
Time of Possession		

Team	Category	Player	Statistics
La. Tech	Passing	Denny Duron	11/20, 227 yds, 2 TD
La. Tech	Rushing	Glen Berteau	10 car, 58 yds, 2 TD
La. Tech	Receiving	Roger Carr	6 rec, 141 yds, 1 TD
TTU	Passing	Mike Ledford	
TTU	Rushing		
TTU	Receiving		
