= 1973 Camellia Bowl =

- NCAA Division II Football Championship
Louisiana Tech Bulldogs	Western Kentucky Hilltoppers
(11–1)	(12–0)
Southland Conference	Ohio Valley Conference
34	0
Head coach: Maxie Lambright	Head coach: Jimmy Feix
	1	2	3	4	Total
Louisiana Tech	10	14	0	10	34
Western Kentucky	0	0	0	0	0
- Date: December 15, 1973
- Season: 1973
- Stadium: Hughes Stadium
- Location: Sacramento, California
- Referee: Bill Love
- Attendance: 12,016

United States TV coverage
- Network: ABC

The 1973 Camellia Bowl was the NCAA Division II Football Championship game following the 1973 season, between the Louisiana Tech Bulldogs and the Western Kentucky Hilltoppers.

== Notable participants ==
Notable participants for Louisiana Tech include Fred Dean, Roger Carr, Pat Tilley, Roland Harper, Mike Barber, John Henry White, Billy Ryckman, Maxie Lambright, Mickey Slaughter, Pat Patterson, and Pat Collins.

== Game summary ==
=== Scoring summary ===
Scoring summary

Quarter	Time	Drive			Team	Scoring information	Score	
Quarter	Time	Plays	Yards	TOP	Team	Scoring information	La. Tech	WKU
1					La. Tech	33-yard field goal by Jerry Pope	3	0
1					La. Tech	Charles McDaniel 1-yard touchdown run, Jerry Pope kick good	10	0
2					La. Tech	Interception returned 11 yards for touchdown by Danny Curtis, Jerry Pope kick good	17	0
2					La. Tech	Roger Carr 36-yard touchdown reception from Denny Duron, Jerry Pope kick good	24	0
4					La. Tech	31-yard field goal by Jerry Pope	27	0
4					La. Tech	Pat Tilley 28-yard touchdown reception from Steve Haynes, Jerry Pope kick good	34	0
"TOP" = time of possession. For other American football terms, see Glossary of American football.							34	0

=== Statistics ===
	1	2	3	4	Total
Bulldogs	10	14	0	10	34
Hilltoppers	0	0	0	0	0

Statistics	La. Tech	WKU
First downs	17	7
Total offense, yards	336	76
Rushes-yards (net)	58–186	27–(−12)
Passing yards (net)	150	88
Passes, Comp-Att-Int	10–27–0	12–37–4
Time of Possession		

Team	Category	Player	Statistics
La. Tech	Passing	Denny Duron	4/14, 78 yds, 1 TD
La. Tech	Rushing	Charles McDaniel	21 car, 116 yds, 1 TD
La. Tech	Receiving	Pat Tilley	7 rec, 106 yds, 1 TD
WKU	Passing	Dennis Tomek	10/32, 91 yds, 3 INT
WKU	Rushing	John Embree	9 car, 38 yds
WKU	Receiving	Porter Williams	7 rec, 66 yds
