= 1977 Independence Bowl =

Louisville Cardinals	Louisiana Tech Bulldogs
(7–3–1)	(8–1–2)
Independent	Southland Conference
14	24
Head coach: Vince Gibson	Head coach: Maxie Lambright
	1	2	3	4	Total
Louisville	7	0	7	0	14
Louisiana Tech	21	3	0	0	24
- Date: December 17, 1977
- Season: 1977
- Stadium: State Fair Stadium
- Location: Shreveport, Louisiana
- MVP: QB Keith Thibodeaux, La. Tech (Offensive); LB Otis Wilson, UL (Defensive)
- Attendance: 22,223
- Payout: US$75,000

The 1977 Independence Bowl featured the Louisville Cardinals and the Southland Conference champion Louisiana Tech Bulldogs. Louisville struck first on a 60-yard punt return for a touchdown by Kevin Miller in the first quarter. Louisiana Tech answered with a 1-yard touchdown run by Lewis to tie the game. The Bulldogs scored another touchdown on a 41-yard Keith Thibodeaux pass to Pree. Still in the first quarter, Thibodeaux threw an 8-yard touchdown pass to McCartney to increase Louisiana Tech's lead to 21–7. In the second quarter, Swiley connected on a 21-yard field goal to give the Dawgs a 24–7 halftime lead. In the third quarter, Kevin Miller scored his second touchdown of the game on a 13-yard run to close the gap to 24–14, which would end up being the final score. There were a combined 13 fumbles throughout the game.

== Game summary ==
=== Scoring summary ===
Scoring summary

Quarter	Time	Drive			Team	Scoring information	Score	
Quarter	Time	Plays	Yards	TOP	Team	Scoring information	UL	La. Tech
1	13:10				UL	Kevin Miller 60-yard punt return for a touchdown, Pedro Posadas kick good	7	0
1	8:49				La. Tech	Charlie Lewis 1-yard touchdown run, Keith Swilley kick good	7	7
1	5:22				La. Tech	George Pree 41-yard touchdown reception from Keith Thibodeaux, kick no good	7	13
1	2:21				La. Tech	Larry McCartney 8-yard touchdown reception from Keith Thibodeaux, 2-point run good	7	21
2	1:49				La. Tech	21-yard field goal by Keith Swilley	7	24
3	9:52	13	58		UL	Kevin Miller 13-yard touchdown run, Pedro Posadas kick good	14	24
"TOP" = time of possession. For other American football terms, see Glossary of American football.							14	24

=== Statistics ===
	1	2	3	4	Total
Cardinals	7	0	7	0	14
Bulldogs	21	3	0	0	24

Statistics	UL	La. Tech
First downs	11	25
Total offense, yards	161	335
Rushes-yards (net)	44–100	44–48
Passing yards (net)	61	287
Passes, Comp-Att-Int	9–23–1	19–39–2
Time of Possession		

Team	Category	Player	Statistics
UL	Passing	Stu Stram	7/18, 61 yds, 1 INT
UL	Rushing	Nathan Poole	17 car, 50 yds
UL	Receiving	Mark Besanceney	2 rec, 25 yds
La. Tech	Passing	Keith Thibodeaux	19/39, 287 yds, 2 TD, 2 INT
La. Tech	Rushing	Charlie Lewis	17 car, 39 yds, 1 TD
La. Tech	Receiving	Rod Foppe	4 rec, 78 yds
