= Skip Holtz =

American football player and coach (born 1964)

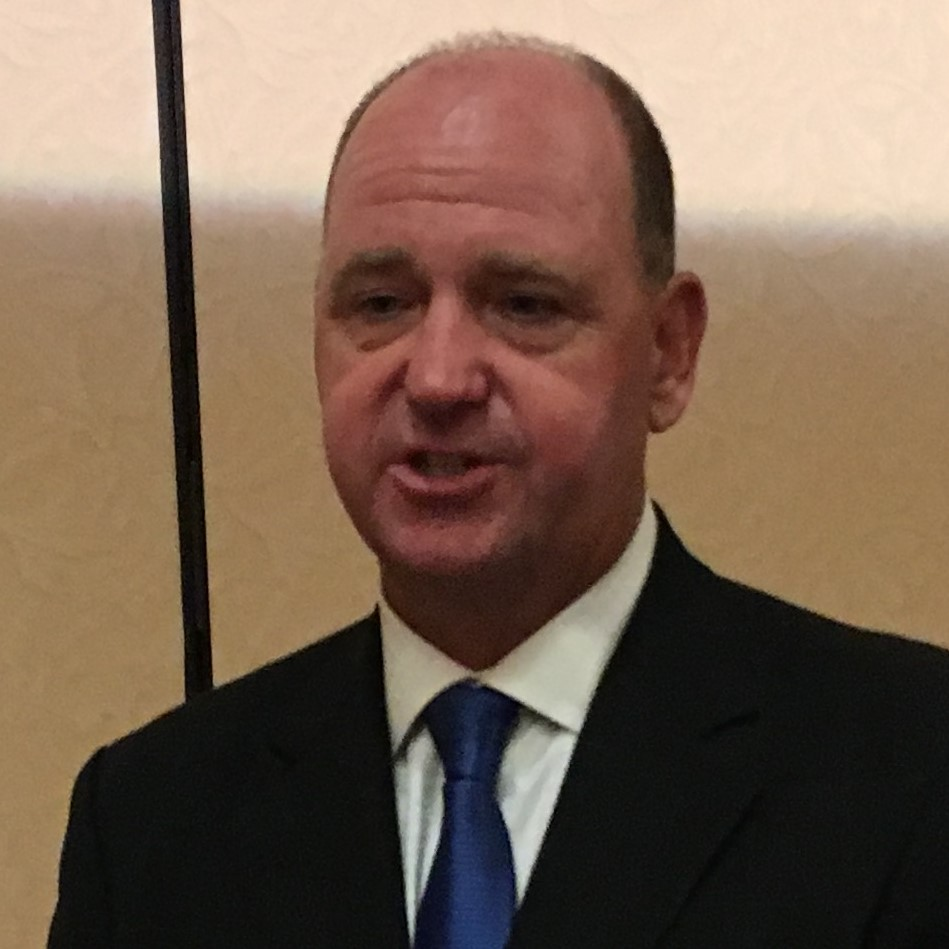
- Holtz at 2017 C-USA Media Days

Personal information
- Born: March 12, 1964 (age 62); Willimantic, Connecticut, U.S.

Career information
- High school: Fayetteville (Fayetteville, Arkansas)
- College: Notre Dame

Career history

Coaching
- Florida State (1987–1988) Graduate assistant; Colorado State (1989) Wide receivers coach; Notre Dame (1990–1991) Wide receivers coach; Notre Dame (1992–1993) Offensive coordinator; Connecticut (1994–1998) Head coach; South Carolina (1999–2003) Assistant head coach & offensive coordinator; South Carolina (2004) Assistant head coach & quarterbacks coach; East Carolina (2005–2009) Head coach; South Florida (2010–2012) Head coach; Louisiana Tech (2013–2021) Head coach; Birmingham Stallions (2022–2025) Head coach/offensive coordinator & quarterbacks coach

Operations
- Birmingham Stallions (2022) General manager

Awards and highlights
- USFL/UFL: 2× USFL champion (2022, 2023); UFL champion (2024); USFL Coach of the Year (2023); NCAA: 2× C-USA (2008, 2009); 2× C-USA East Division (2008, 2009); 3× C-USA West Division (2014, 2016, 2019); Atlantic 10 New England Division (1998); C-USA Coach of the Year (2016)

Head coaching record
- Regular season: USFL/UFL: 33–7 (.825)
- Postseason: USFL/UFL: 6–1 (.857)
- Career: College: 152–121 (.557); USFL/UFL: 39–8 (.830)

Louis Leo "Skip" Holtz Jr. (born March 12, 1964) is an American football coach who recently served as the head coach for the Birmingham Stallions of the United Football League (UFL). Holtz led the team to two USFL Championships, in 2022 and 2023, and a UFL Championship in 2024. Previously, he was the head coach for the Louisiana Tech Bulldogs, South Florida Bulls, East Carolina Pirates, and the Connecticut Huskies. He has also served as an assistant coach for the South Carolina Gamecocks, Notre Dame Fighting Irish, Colorado State Rams, and the Florida State Seminoles.

Skip's father, Lou Holtz, was a former head football coach and worked as a commentator on the television channel ESPN. Due to his father's career as a collegiate football coach, Skip was exposed to football from an early age. He played college football at Notre Dame, where he played mostly on special teams. He joined the coaching ranks immediately upon graduation from college, working initially for Bobby Bowden as an assistant at Florida State. He gradually worked his way through the ranks at various NCAA Division I schools before being named head coach at Connecticut in 1994. He has an overall record of 152 wins and 121 losses as a head coach, including eight bowl wins and two conference championships.

== Early life ==
Skip Holtz grew up in many towns while his father coached football. After Skip was born in Connecticut, the Holtz family moved to Columbia, South Carolina, for two years, as his father worked as an assistant coach at the University of South Carolina. In 1968, the family moved to Columbus, Ohio, after Holtz took a job at Ohio State University. One year later, the Holtz family moved to Williamsburg, Virginia, and The College of William & Mary for Lou's first head coaching position. After two seasons, Lou took a head coaching position with the Wolfpack of North Carolina State University. The family lived in Raleigh, North Carolina, for four years until Lou accepted a head coaching job for the National Football League's New York Jets. The family lived in Cold Spring Harbor, New York, for one year, while Lou coached the Jets. After resigning from the Jets, Lou took his family back to the American South when he accepted the head coaching job in Fayetteville, Arkansas, at the University of Arkansas in 1977. In Fayetteville, Skip attended Fayetteville High School and graduated in 1982.

== Playing career ==
While at high school in Fayetteville, Skip played for the school's football team at the quarterback position, bringing moderate success to the program. As a high school junior, he visited Notre Dame and met with head football coach Gerry Faust and head basketball coach Digger Phelps. In his final year of high school, Skip was denied admission to Notre Dame due to average grades and his failure to learn a foreign language. Coaches Faust and Phelps encouraged Skip to enroll at nearby Holy Cross College, located adjacent to the university in Notre Dame, Indiana. After two years of study at Holy Cross, Skip had improved his grades and transferred to Notre Dame. After his first year, Skip decided he wanted to speak with Coach Faust about walking on to the football team during his senior year. The discussions were cut short, however, as after the 1985 season, Coach Faust resigned. Replacing Faust was Skip's father Lou. Skip began spring practice before the 1986 season as a quarterback, but quickly changed to flanker due to his lack of throwing ability. As a flanker, he earned 54 yards on three receptions at the Blue-Gold intra-squad game in the spring of 1986. During the fall of 1986, Skip played in all 11 games on special teams. He never caught a pass, but rushed once for one yard.

== Coaching career ==
=== Early positions ===
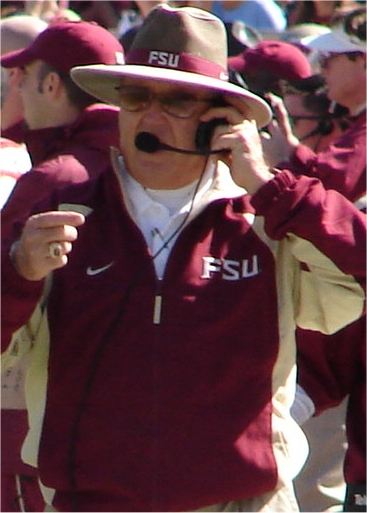
Skip coached under Bobby Bowden for two years.

Due to Skip's lack of success on the field and his desire to remain associated with football, he began to investigate the possibility of becoming a coach. After Skip told Lou he wanted to start coaching, Lou put together a list of potential coaches who would give him the best training. The list included Tom Osborne, Joe Paterno, and Terry Donahue, but upon hearing of Skip's interest, Florida State head coach Bobby Bowden said, "if you can be here in two days, I've got a job for you at Florida State."

Upon arriving at Florida State in 1987, he became the graduate assistant coach. He met his future wife, Jennifer, in Coach Bowden's office while in Tallahassee. He left after two years to become the wide receivers coach at Colorado State University under coach Earle Bruce. After one season, he went back to Notre Dame to coach under his father.

=== Notre Dame ===
Holtz's first job at his alma mater was to serve as wide receivers coach, and he filled the position for two years. In 1992, the team began a search for a new offensive coordinator. Lou's first choice, Joe Moore, declined. Lou then asked Skip for recommendations to fill the position. Skip initially said he wanted the position but said of Lou, "he couldn't do it at that time with me [Skip] being his son." Skip then mentioned Mark Richt, who was then the offensive coordinator at Florida State. Lou Holtz called Coach Bowden to ask permission to speak to Mark Richt. Coach Bowden said Holtz could hire Richt as long as he could hire Skip. Coach Holtz said, "Well, if I'm just going to switch coaches, I might as well hire Skip." Skip became Notre Dame's offensive coordinator in 1992. Between 1992 and 1994, Skip and his father recorded 40 wins, eight losses, and one tie, an 82.7% winning percentage. Together, they coached Notre Dame to the Cotton Bowl Classic twice, beating Texas A&M both times. Skip had the third-best total offense in the NCAA during the 1992 football season.

=== Connecticut ===
Following his success at Notre Dame, Skip Holtz was asked to become the head coach of the Connecticut Huskies. He accepted the offer and took his first head coaching job on December 23, 1993. He replaced Tom Jackson, who had gone 14–19 over the past three years and had decided to resign on November 17, 1993. He agreed to a four-year contract at a salary of $95,000 a year. Even though Skip came from a "major football institution" (Notre Dame), University of Connecticut President Dr. Harry J. Hartley said that the hire "should not be seen as a signal that Connecticut intends to upgrade its program." Despite Hartley's remarks, Holtz planned to help elevate the team from I-AA to I-A. Holtz commented on Hartley's remarks by saying "I'd love to have the opportunity to coach a Division I team here...." In 1998, UConn, after 100 years of football and five years with Skip Holtz as its head coach, played in its first Division I-AA playoff game. The Huskies scored two fourth-quarter touchdowns to beat Hampton University, 42–34. In the next round of the playoffs, the Huskies lost to eventual runner-up Georgia Southern on December 5. Two days later, Skip resigned as head coach of the Huskies in order to rejoin his father, who had taken the head coaching job at South Carolina the day before the Huskies' loss. As the leader of the Huskies football team, he accumulated a winning percentage of .596 (34–23) over five seasons.

=== South Carolina ===
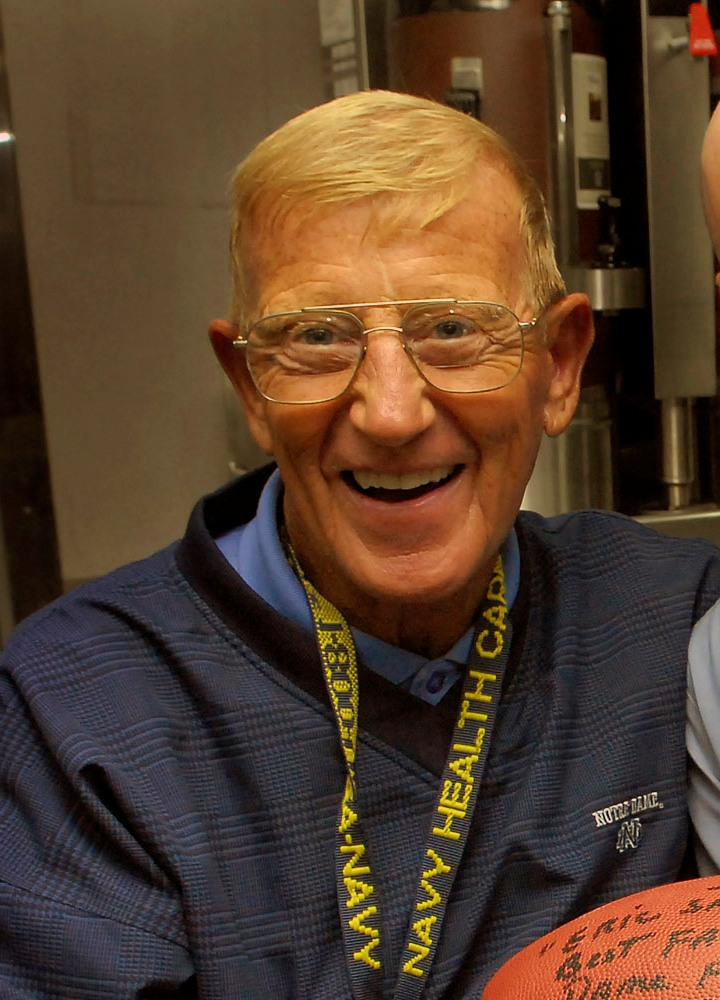
Skip Holtz's father, Lou

On December 4, 1998, The University of South Carolina announced that Lou Holtz would serve as its next head football coach. Lou asked Skip if he would move down to Columbia to become his offensive coordinator—the same position Skip held during his final two years at Notre Dame. Skip accepted the offer, in part due to a desire to live closer to his parents and so his children could spend more time with their grandparents. In 1996, Skip's mother, Beth, was diagnosed with throat cancer. Two years later, the cancer spread to her liver, lung, adrenal glands, and ovary. Meanwhile, Skip and Lou continued to coach football at South Carolina. As Lou began to struggle as head coach, the question of his eventual successor arose. When Skip was hired in 1998, Lou had included a clause in the hiring contract that Skip would succeed him after he retired. South Carolina Athletic Director Mike McGee rebutted by saying, "There are no formal or informal guarantees at him," and "It's always helpful to have potential succession in a staff."

The 2000 and 2001 seasons brought South Carolina back to national prominence with consecutive Outback Bowl wins over Ohio State and season ending rankings in the Top 25. However, after going 5–7 the following two seasons and suffering a season-ending blowout in 2003 by intrastate rival Clemson, Skip was demoted from the offensive coordinator and assistant head coaching positions to quarterbacks coach. Four assistant coaches—including the team's defensive coordinator—were fired in the same shakeup that saw Skip demoted. On November 22, 2004, one season after Skip's demotion, Lou Holtz announced he was retiring as head coach of South Carolina. The next day, South Carolina announced Steve Spurrier as the next head football coach. Coach Spurrier announced that he was keeping only three members of Lou Holtz's staff. Letters were sent to all the other staffers—including Skip Holtz—informing them that they likely would not be retained.

=== East Carolina ===
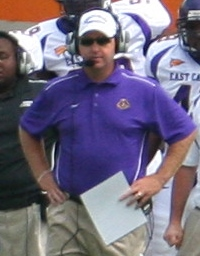
Holtz at ECU in 2007.

With his firing imminent, Holtz resigned. Because he was formerly a head coach, Skip had several offers from Division I-A and Division I-AA teams. After several interviews, he elected to take the head coaching position at East Carolina University. East Carolina announced Skip Holtz as their 19th head football coach on December 3, 2004. Holtz assumed control of a program that won just three games in its past 25 contests. Skip signed 23 athletes in his first recruiting class, including his first commit, Rob Kass. Also included in the recruiting class was future NFL player Aundrae Allison. Skip's first victory at ECU came in the first game of the 2005 season as the Pirates defeated the Duke Blue Devils 24–21 at Dowdy–Ficklen Stadium. The victory was ECU's first non-conference Division I win since 2000, when the Pirates won the Galleryfurniture.com Bowl against Texas Tech. During Holtz's first season, the Pirates also defeated conference foes Rice, Southern Methodist University, Marshall University, and the University of Alabama Birmingham.

In 2006, Holtz's second season as head coach, ECU won seven games, including victories over intrastate rival NC State, Conference USA East rival Southern Miss, and ACC foe Virginia. As a reward for their season, the Pirates earned their first bowl game under Holtz's tenure, playing the Bulls of the University of South Florida in the Papajohns.com Bowl, losing 24–7. Despite the bowl loss, the 2006 season was ECU's first winning season since 2000, and the Papajohns.com Bowl was the Pirates' first bowl game since 2001.

In 2007, Holtz's team won eight games, including wins over intrastate rival North Carolina and going 3–2, versus Conference USA East opponents. Finishing second in the East Division, Holtz's team was invited to the Hawai'i Bowl to play #24 Boise State University. East Carolina won the bowl game 41–38. This was the first bowl victory since the 2000 Galleryfurniture.com Bowl versus Texas Tech. It was also the first back-to-back winning season and bowl berth since the 1999 and 2000 seasons.

The 2008 season was opened with two upsets over ranked opponents; 17th ranked Virginia Tech in week one and 8th ranked West Virginia. This was the first time a Conference USA team beat three ranked teams in a row. Skip finished up the season 9–5, which included a C-USA East Division title and C-USA Champions title. This was the first time the Pirates played in the C-USA Championship Game. It also was the first conference title since 1976. The Pirates played in the Liberty Bowl, losing to Kentucky, 25–19. This was the third Liberty Bowl appearance. The last time the Pirates went to three straight bowl games was the 1999, 2000 and 2001 seasons. In 2009 Skip Holtz led the ECU Pirates to a second CUSA championship.

=== South Florida ===
On January 14, 2010, it was announced that Holtz accepted the head coach position at the University of South Florida, in Tampa, Florida, taking the place of the recently fired Jim Leavitt. A press conference to introduce Holtz to the community was held January 15, 2010. When someone in the crowd called out, "Beat Florida!", Holtz replied, "That's why I'm here!" However, the Bulls would eventually end up on the short end of the stick in their match-up with the Gators later that season, 38–14.

Holtz earned his first win as head coach of the Bulls on September 1, 2010, in USF's season opener against Stony Brook 59–14. Later that season, Holtz led his Bulls to the program's first victory over the Miami Hurricanes. At the end of the season Holtz lead the USF Bulls to a mostly dominant 31–26 victory over the Clemson Tigers at the Meineke Car Care Bowl. This would mark the first Bowl victory for USF over a BCS team. The Bulls finished with an 8–5 record, but 3–4 in Big East play.

To start the 2011 season, Skip Holtz led the Bulls to an emotional homecoming against his alma mater, Notre Dame. After the 6 hour game and 2 rain delays, USF left South Bend with a 23–20 victory. However, the Bulls finished the season with a disappointing record of 5–7, 1–6 in Big East play. The 2012 season was even worse as the Bulls fell to a dismal 3–9, 1–6 in Big East play. USF fired Holtz at the conclusion of the 2012 season.

=== Louisiana Tech ===
On December 13, 2012, Holtz accepted an offer to become the head coach for the Louisiana Tech Bulldogs. His first season, 2013, was a down year, as he finished well below expectations at 4–8. However, 2014 would see a big turnaround. Holtz's Bulldogs went on to finish first in C-USA West at 9–5 with a 35–18 win over Illinois in the Heart Of Dallas Bowl. In 2015, the Bulldogs continued their success finishing 9–4 and winning the New Orleans Bowl over Arkansas State, 47–28. The 2020 season saw a final record of 5–5, and also saw a disastrous, blow out (38-3) bowl loss to Georgia Southern. The 2021 season was even worse, with a final record of 3–9 (and no bowl invite) after which Holtz was fired by Louisiana Tech.

=== Birmingham Stallions ===
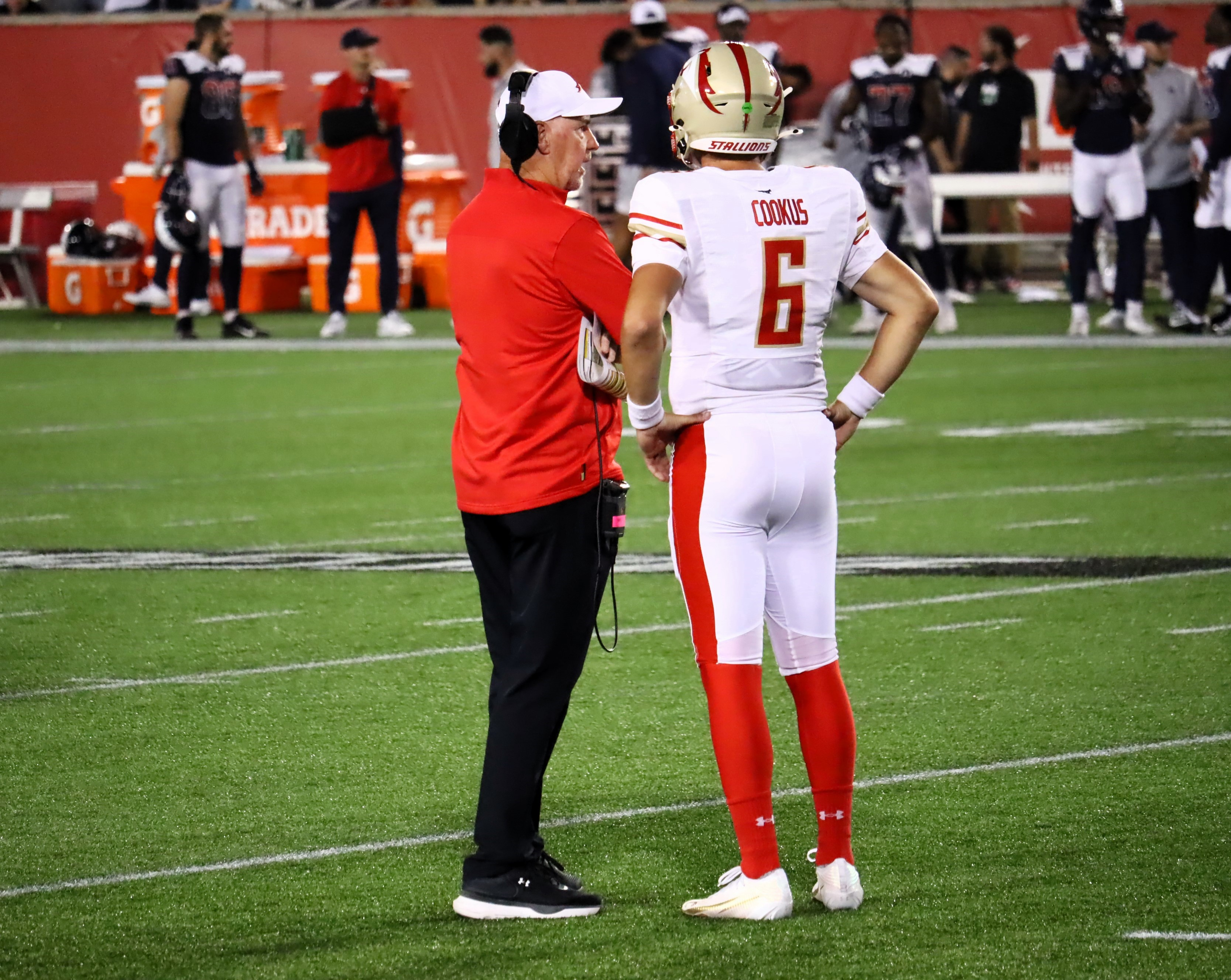
Holtz (left) with Case Cookus as coach of the Birmingham Stallions

On January 20, 2022, Holtz was named head coach and general manager of the Birmingham Stallions of the United States Football League (USFL). During his stint in Birmingham, he led the team to USFL championships in 2022 and 2023 and a UFL championship in 2024.

Holtz was removed from the Stallions head coaching position in favor of A. J. McCarron on December 16, 2025, in apparent protest of incoming owner Mike Repole's plan to void all of the league's rosters and force all eight teams to start over in a dispersal draft.

== Personal life ==
Holtz and his wife Jennifer Fitzgerald, whom he met while he was working at Florida State, have two sons and a daughter. Holtz co-hosts the annual spring golf tournament named the Drew Steele-Skip Holtz Golf Classic. Drew Steele is the son of former East Carolina basketball coach Mike Steele and has Down syndrome. When they first met, Holtz was impressed by Drew's positive attitude, and he has since called upon Drew to help motivate the football team, both as a speaker and through work with the team. The Drew Steele-Skip Holtz Golf Classic benefits citizens of Pitt County with special needs.

== Head coaching record ==
=== College ===
Year	Team	Overall	Conference	Standing	Bowl/playoffs	TSN^{#}
Connecticut Huskies (Yankee Conference) (1994–1996)
1994	Connecticut	4–7	4–4	3rd (New England)		
1995	Connecticut	8–3	5–3	2nd (New England)		23
1996	Connecticut	5–6	3–5	4th (New England)		
Connecticut Huskies (Atlantic 10 Conference) (1997–1998)
1997	Connecticut	7–4	4–4	T–2nd (New England)		
1998	Connecticut	10–3	6–2	T–1st (New England)	L NCAA Division I-AA Quarterfinal	9
Connecticut:		34–23	22–18			
East Carolina Pirates (Conference USA) (2005–2009)
2005	East Carolina	5–6	4–4	4th (East)		
2006	East Carolina	7–6	5–3	2nd (East)	L PapaJohns.com	
2007	East Carolina	8–5	6–2	T–2nd (East)	W Hawaii	
2008	East Carolina	9–5	6–2	1st (East)	L Liberty	
2009	East Carolina	9–5	7–1	1st (East)	L Liberty	
East Carolina:		38–27	28–12			
South Florida Bulls (Big East Conference) (2010–2012)
2010	South Florida	8–5	3–4	T–5th	W Meineke Car Care	
2011	South Florida	5–7	1–6	T–7th		
2012	South Florida	3–9	1–6	8th		
South Florida:		16–21	5–16			
Louisiana Tech Bulldogs (Conference USA) (2013–2021)
2013	Louisiana Tech	4–8	3–5	5th (West)		
2014	Louisiana Tech	9–5	7–1	1st (West)	W Heart of Dallas	
2015	Louisiana Tech	9–4	6–2	2nd (West)	W New Orleans	
2016	Louisiana Tech	9–5	6–2	1st (West)	W Armed Forces	
2017	Louisiana Tech	7–6	4–4	4th (West)	W Frisco	
2018	Louisiana Tech	8–5	5–3	T–2nd (West)	W Hawaii	
2019	Louisiana Tech	10–3	6–2	T–1st (West)	W Independence	
2020	Louisiana Tech	5–5	4–2	3rd (West)	L New Orleans	
2021	Louisiana Tech	3–9	2–6	T–6th (West)		
Louisiana Tech:		64–50	43–27			
Total:		152–121				
National championship Conference title Conference division title or championship game berth
^{#}Rankings from final Sports Network Poll.

=== USFL/UFL ===
League	Team	Year	Regular season				Postseason			
League	Team	Year	Won	Lost	Win %	Finish	Won	Lost	Win %	Result
USFL	BHAM	2022	9	1	.900	1st in South Division	2	0	1.000	USFL Champions
USFL	BHAM	2023	8	2	.800	1st in South Division	2	0	1.000	USFL Champions
UFL	BHAM	2024	9	1	.900	1st in USFL Conference	2	0	1.000	UFL Champions
UFL	BHAM	2025	7	3	.700	1st in USFL Conference	0	1	.000	Lost to Michigan Panthers in USFL Conference Championship Game
Total			33	7	.825		6	1	.857	
