= Louisiana Tech Bulldogs football =

College football organization

2026 Louisiana Tech Bulldogs football team
- First season: 1901; 125 years ago
- Athletic director: Ryan Ivey
- Head coach: Sonny Cumbie; 5th season, 19–31 (.380)
- Location: Ruston, Louisiana
- Stadium: Joe Aillet Stadium (capacity: 28,562)
- NCAA division: Division I FBS
- Conference: Sun Belt
- Colors: Blue and red
- All-time record: 654–508–37 (.561)
- Bowl record: 9–5–1 (.633)

NCAA Division II championships
- 1973

Small college national championships
- 1972, 1974

Conference championships
- LIAA: 1915, 1921 LIC: 1941, 1945, 1947 GSC: 1949, 1952, 1953, 1955, 1957, 1958, 1959, 1960, 1964, 1969 Southland: 1971, 1972, 1973, 1974, 1977, 1978, 1982, 1984 WAC: 2001, 2011

Division championships
- C-USA West: 2014, 2016, 2019 Sun Belt West: 2026
- Consensus All-Americans: 3
- Rivalries: Louisiana (rivalry); Louisiana–Monroe (rivalry); Southern Miss (rivalry)
- Fight song: Tech Fight
- Mascot: Tech (live); Champ (costumed)
- Marching band: Band of Pride
- Outfitter: Adidas
- Website: LaTechSports.com

The Louisiana Tech Bulldogs football team represents Louisiana Tech University in college football at the NCAA Division I Football Bowl Subdivision level. After 13 seasons competing in Conference USA, the Bulldogs became a member of the Sun Belt Conference on July 1, 2026.

Since its first season in 1901, Louisiana Tech has compiled an all-time record of 654 wins, 508 losses, and 37 ties. In 121 football seasons, the Bulldogs have won 3 Division II national championships, won 25 conference championships, and played in 30 postseason games, including 15 major college bowl games. Since 1968, the Bulldogs have played their home games at Joe Aillet Stadium in Ruston, Louisiana. The program's current head coach is Sonny Cumbie.

== History ==
=== Early history (1901–1939) ===
Louisiana Tech University first fielded a football team in 1901, beginning the season with a 57–0 loss to LSU. The program would see its first win the following year, defeating the Monroe Athletic Association 6–5.Although no coach stayed with the program for more than one season for the first 8 years, Percy S. Prince became the head coach in 1909 and coached the Bulldog football team through the 1915 season. 1915 saw the Bulldogs win the Louisiana Intercollegiate Athletic Association championship, their first conference title. Coach Prince left the university to serve in World War I but would return to coach for one more season in 1919.

George Bohler served as the head football coach at Louisiana Tech from 1930 to 1933, compiling a 15–17 record. Bohler's 1931 team finished with an undefeated 7–0, but other than that, Bohler's Bulldogs were unable to win more than four games in a single season. Eddie McLane left Samford and replaced Bohler in 1934. He led the team through the 1938 season, compiling a 27–19–4 record, which included three consecutive winning seasons from 1935 to 1937. In 1939, Ray E. Davis became the head coach of the Bulldogs for a single season, going 5–6.

=== Joe Aillet era (1940–1966) ===
Northwestern State quarterbacks coach Joe Aillet took over the Bulldogs football program in 1940, leading the team through the 1966 season. Aillet led the Bulldogs to 21 winning seasons in his 26 as head coach, as well as three 9–1 seasons, and 12 conference championships. His tenure as head coach also saw the program move from the Louisiana Intercollegiate Conference to the Gulf States Conference in 1948. Aillet retired as head coach following the 1966 season, and continued to be the school's athletic director until 1970. Aillet's namesake is Louisiana Tech's home stadium, Joe Aillet Stadium, dedicated in 1972 following his passing in 1970. He is the winningest coach in Tech football history, compiling a record of 151–86–8.

=== Maxie Lambright era (1967–1978) ===
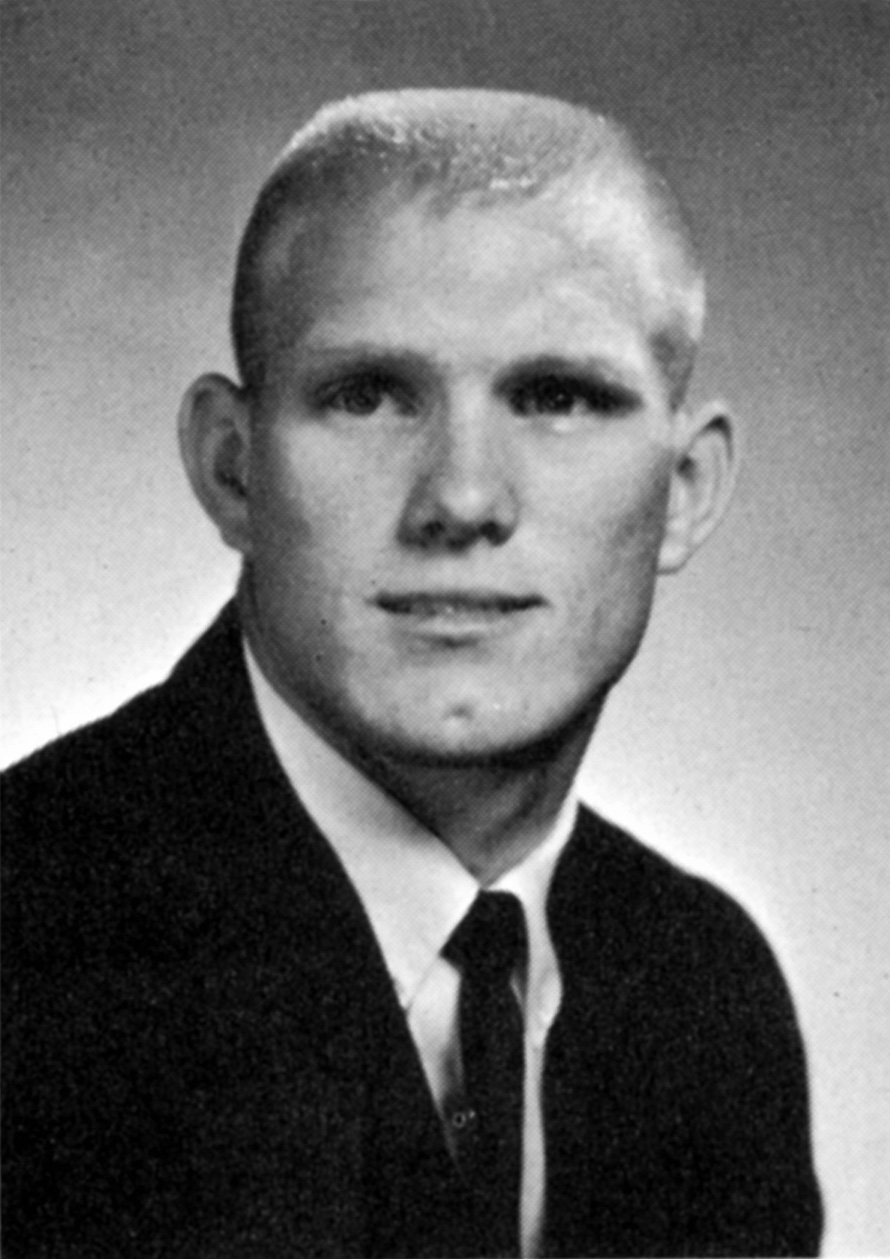
Terry Bradshaw in 1967 during his playing days at Louisiana Tech

Southern Miss assistant coach Maxie Lambright took over the Bulldogs football program following Aillet's retirement. Under Lambright, the Bulldogs were able to enjoy even greater success, winning three consecutive division II national championships from 1972 to 1974, along with seven conference championships. Lambright also coached quarterback Terry Bradshaw, who caused a media frenzy on account of his reputation of being a football sensation from nearby Shreveport. Initially, Bradshaw was second on the depth chart at quarterback behind Phil Robertson, who would later become famous as the inventor of the Duck Commander duck call and television personality on the A&E program Duck Dynasty. Robertson was a year ahead of Bradshaw and was the starter for two seasons in 1966 and 1967, but chose not to play in 1968. In place of Robertson, Bradshaw amassed 2,890 total yards in 1968 and led the Bulldogs to the first place rank in the College Division poll. By the end of the season, Bradshaw led his team to a 9–2 record and the NCAA College Division Mideast Region championship, earning a 33–13 win over Akron in the Grantland Rice Bowl. In 1969, Bradshaw was considered by most professional scouts to be the most outstanding college football player in the nation. In his senior season, he gained 2,314 yards, ranking third in the NCAA, and led his team to an 8–2 record. His decrease in production was mainly due to a reduced 10–game schedule, and the fact that he was taken out of several games in the second half because the Bulldogs had built up a huge lead. Bradshaw graduated owning virtually all Louisiana Tech passing records at the time and would go on to enjoy a Hall of Fame professional football career quarterbacking the NFL's Pittsburgh Steelers. In 1984, Bradshaw was inducted into the inaugural class of the Louisiana Tech sports hall of fame. Four years later, he was inducted into the state of Louisiana's sports hall of fame.

1970 saw the Bulldogs take a step back following Bradshaw's move to the NFL, stumbling to a 2–8 record. However, the following 4 years are generally regarded by Tech fans as the golden era of the program. Moving to the Southland Conference, this period saw the Bulldogs win 4 straight conference championships, a regional championship in 1971 and 1972, and 3 national championships from 1972 to 1974. In 1971, Tech finished with a number 4 ranking in the final Division II poll, and a win over Eastern Michigan in the Pioneer Bowl. 1972 saw a perfect 12–0 record, a final ranking of number 2, and the Mideast championship in the Grantland Rice Bowl. This all culminated in the National Football Foundation College Division National Championship. In 1973, the College Division was split into Divisions II and III, and the postseason bowl system was replaced by an 8–team playoff. This year saw the Bulldogs win the first Division II national championship over Western Kentucky, their first undisputed national championship. The 1974 team found itself in the playoff once again but lost in the semifinals to eventual champion Central Michigan. However, the final UPI was published before the postseason, in which Louisiana Tech was ranked first. As such, the Bulldogs claim the 1974 national championship. 1974 was also the final season of All-American defensive end Fred Dean, who went on to have a very successful NFL career.

The rest of Lambright's tenure two additional conference championships, and a win in the 1977 Independence Bowl. Lambright retired as Louisiana Tech's head football coach following the 1978 season, leaving with 3 national championships, 7 conference championships, and a 95–36–2 record.

=== Larry Beightol era (1979) ===
Arkansas offensive line coach Larry Beightol succeeded Lambright. Tech suffered one of its worst seasons in school history under Beightol, finishing with a 3–8 record in 1979. Beightol was fired after a 1–9 start to the 1979 season, and endured mass defections from players who had previously competed in the last two Independence Bowls. Longtime Tech baseball and assistant football coach Pat Patterson served as the interim head coach for the final game of the season, winning 13–10 over local rival Northeast Louisiana.

=== Billy Brewer era (1980–1982) ===
Southeastern Louisiana head coach Billy Brewer replaced Beightol and was head coach at Louisiana Tech from 1980 to 1982, posting a record of 19–15–1. His last season at Tech saw the Bulldogs win the Southland Conference title with a 10–3 record. Earning a bid to the Division I-AA playoffs the second-seeded Bulldogs made it to the semifinals before losing to Delaware 17–0. Brewer's success with the Bulldogs led to interest from many I-A schools, culminating with Brewer accepting an offer from Ole Miss after the 1982 season.

=== A. L. Williams era (1983–1986) ===
Coach A. L. Williams came to Louisiana Tech from Northwestern State and compiled a 28–19–1 record in four seasons. Williams's first season led to the worst record of his tenure, leading the Bulldogs to a 4–7 record. He soon turned the team around a year later, with the team finishing with a 7–4 regular season record and the Southland Conference championship. The Bulldogs then advanced to the 1984 NCAA Division I-AA Football Championship Game, falling to Montana State, 19–6, and finishing with an overall record of 10–5 for the season. The following season saw the Bulldogs earn an 8–3 regular season record, but did not receive a bid to the playoffs. After a 6–4–1 record in 1986, Williams stepped down as Louisiana Tech's head football coach. He is currently honored through the Sarah and A.L Williams Champions Plaza, a plaza located on the north side of Joe Aillet Stadium that honors several Bulldog and Lady Techster student athletes.

=== Carl Torbush era (1987) ===
Ole Miss defensive coordinator Carl Torbush was hired as Williams' replacement in 1987. Torbush only coached the Bulldogs for one season, leading the team to a 3–8 record. Torbush elected to leave Tech for the defensive coordinator position at North Carolina under head coach Mack Brown after the 1987 season.

=== Joe Raymond Peace era (1988–1995) ===
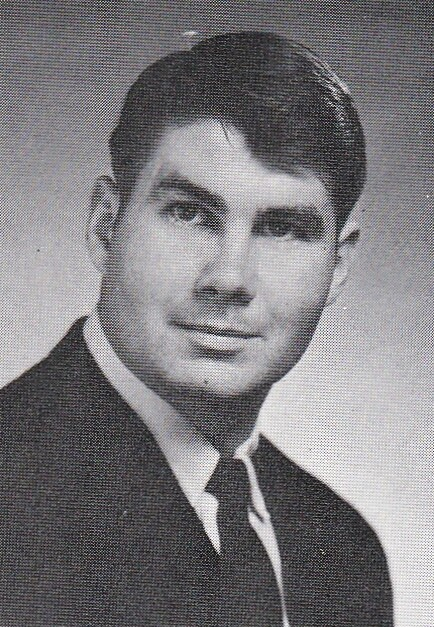
Coach Peace

Louisiana Tech promoted assistant coach Joe Raymond Peace to head coach following Torbush's departure. The most notable event during his tenure was the Bulldogs' transition from Division 1-AA to Division 1-A in 1989, rejoining the top division of college football as an independent. Under Peace, the Bulldogs compiled a 40–44–4 record that included back-to-back eight-win campaigns in 1990 and 1991. The 1990 season ended with Tech getting invited to the Independence Bowl, their first postseason appearance at the Division 1-A level. Offensive lineman Willie Roaf became Louisiana Tech's first consensus All-American in 1993, and went on to have a 13-year career in the NFL. 1993 also saw the Bulldogs move to the Big West Conference, where they remained for the remainder of Peace's tenure in Ruston. Peace was fired following back–to–back 3–8 campaigns in 1993 and 1994, and a 5–6 season in 1995.

=== Gary Crowton era (1996–1998) ===
Tech promoted offensive coordinator Gary Crowton to head coach after Peace's firing. Under Crowton, the Bulldogs went 21–13. The Bulldogs' best season during this era came in 1997 when the Bulldogs finished 9–2. The following season saw a step back in terms of record, with the team going 6–6, although one bright spot was senior wide receiver Troy Edwards. His final season with the Bulldogs saw him break several receiving records including the most receiving yards in one game and most receiving touchdowns in a season, both of which remain NCAA records. This season resulted in Edwards receiving the Fred Biletnikoff Award and Paul Warfield Trophy, as well as getting recognized as a consensus first-team All-American. Crowton left Louisiana Tech following the 1998 season to accept the position of offensive coordinator with the NFL's Chicago Bears.

=== Jack Bicknell era (1999–2006) ===
Coach Jack Bicknell left New Hampshire in 1997 to serve as the offensive line coach for Louisiana Tech. When head coach Gary Crowton left to become the Chicago Bears' offensive coordinator in 1999, Bicknell was promoted to replace him. In his first season as head coach, he led the Bulldogs to an 8–3 record, the school's first AP Top 25 ranking, and a 29–28 upset win over eventual SEC champion Alabama, which is the only win by a team from a non-AQ or Group of Five conference over an SEC champion since the dawn of the BCS era in 1998. This was the final season with quarterback Tim Rattay, who played for the Bulldogs from 1997 to 1999. Rattay set numerous school and NCAA passing records, and is currently 20th all–time in single season passing yards. In 1999, he finished 10th in Heisman Trophy voting, the highest placing of any Louisiana Tech player.

In 2001, following the Western Athletic Conference losing 8 of its members and the creation of the Mountain West Conference, the Bulldogs accepted an invite to the WAC. Louisiana Tech went on to win the WAC championship in its first year of membership, earning Bicknell conference Coach of the Year honors. Louisiana Tech played Clemson in the 2001 Humanitarian Bowl, the program's first postseason appearance since 1990. Tech's star player that year was quarterback Luke McCown, who still owns several of the school's passing records. During his tenure in Ruston, Bicknell's teams defeated AQ-conference teams Alabama, Michigan State and Oklahoma State. 22 of his players also went on to be drafted or signed by National Football League teams. Bicknell was fired by Louisiana Tech following a 3–10 campaign in 2006.

=== Derek Dooley era (2007–2009) ===
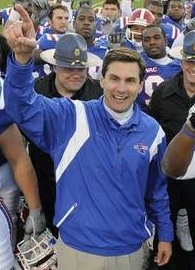
Derek Dooley

Miami Dolphins tight ends coach Derek Dooley, son of coaching legend Vince Dooley, was hired as Bicknell's replacement in 2007. Tech enjoyed a mediocre run during Dooley's tenure starting out at 5–7 in 2007. In 2008, the Bulldogs improved to 8–5 with a win in the Independence Bowl to cap the year. In 2009, the Bulldogs slipped to 4–8. Dooley, who was also serving as Tech's athletics director, left Louisiana Tech after the 2009 season to accept the head coaching position at Tennessee.

=== Sonny Dykes era (2010–2012) ===
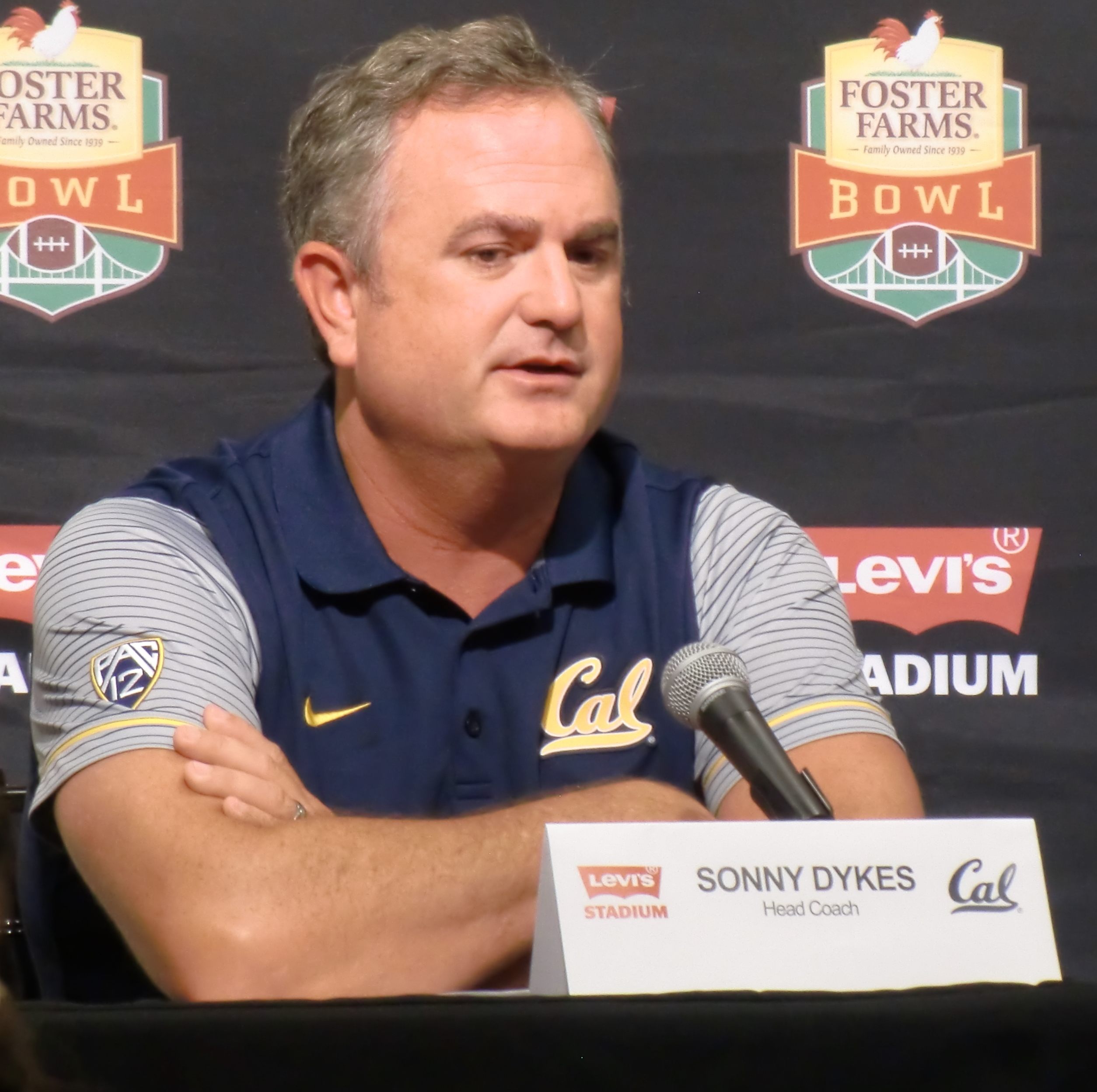
Sonny Dykes

On January 20, 2010, Arizona offensive coordinator Sonny Dykes was hired to replace Dooley as the head football coach at Louisiana Tech. Dykes brought with him an exciting, up-tempo, pass-oriented offense known as the Air Raid.

In Dykes' first season, LA Tech's record improved to 5–7 overall and 4–4 in the WAC. Despite coaching his team to a losing record, LA Tech's offense improved in several areas of the NCAA statistical ranks including passing offense (91st in 2009 to 62nd in 2010) and total offense (66th to 52nd) while the team's average offensive national rank improved from 65th in 2009 to 54th in 2010. Despite a 1–4 start in 2011, Louisiana Tech rallied to win seven consecutive games to cap off the regular season with the program's first WAC football title since 2001 and an appearance in the Poinsettia Bowl to cap the 8–5 season. Punter Ryan Allen was awarded with the Ray Guy Award at the end of the season, as well as conference honors. As a result of Tech's success, Dykes was honored as the 2011 WAC Coach of the Year. At the end of the 2011 season, Dykes signed a contract extension to increase his base salary to at least $700,000. The 2012 team finished with a 9–3 record, the program's best since 1997, but did not participate in a bowl game. The Bulldogs had received an invite to play in the Independence Bowl, but were in talks with both the Liberty Bowl and the Heart of Dallas Bowl and did not accept the bid in time. After the two other bowls passed on Louisiana Tech, the Independence Bowl had already accepted other teams. Despite this end to the season, the program still saw success through Ryan Allen becoming the school's first unanimous All–American, as well as the first punter to win the Ray Guy Award twice.

Dykes resigned as Louisiana Tech head football coach following the 2012 season to accept the same position at California. Dykes guided the Bulldogs to a 22–15 record over his 3 seasons as head coach.

=== Skip Holtz era (2013–2021) ===
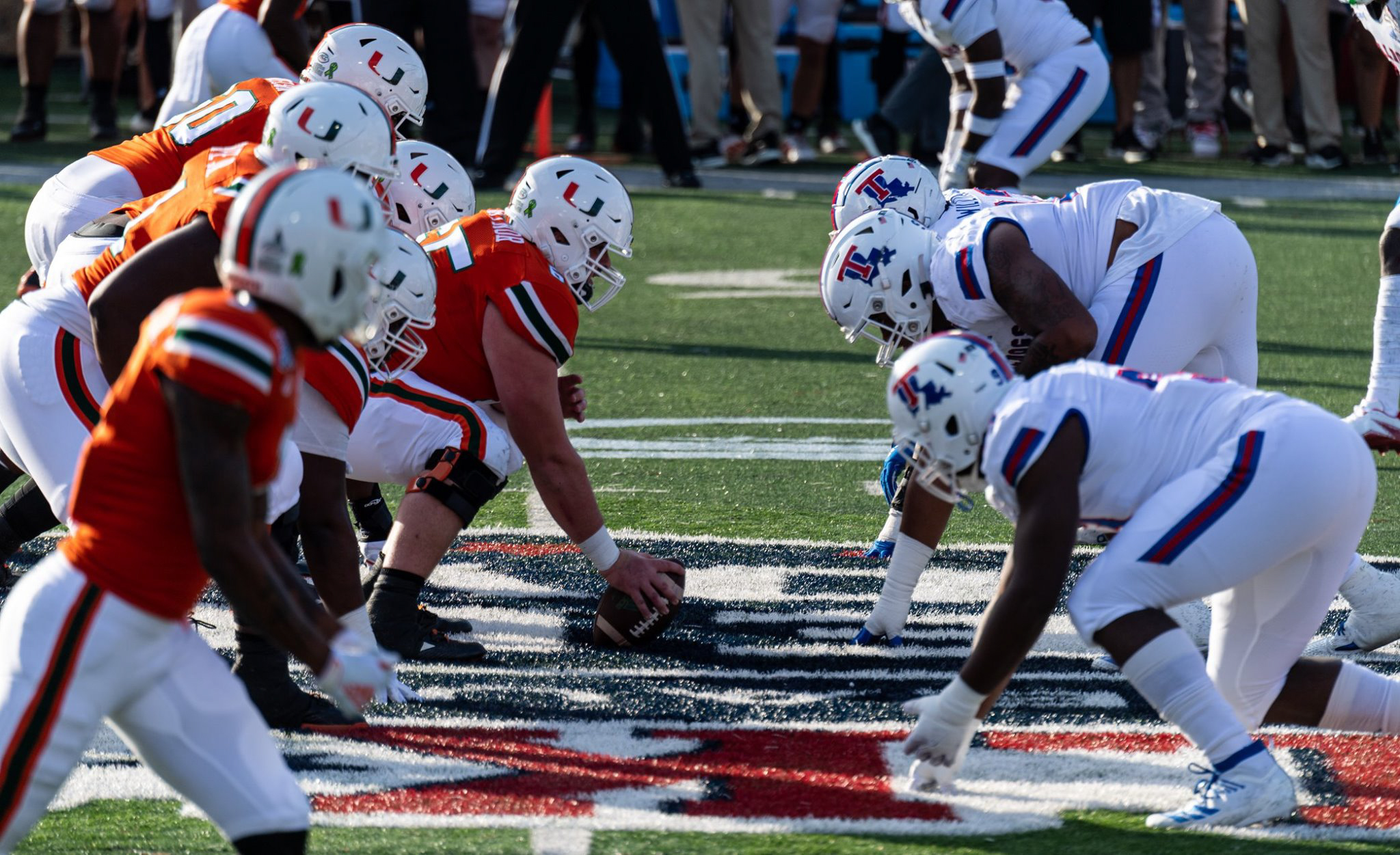
Miami (left in orange jerseys) and Louisiana Tech line up before a snap in the 2019 Independence Bowl in Shreveport, Louisiana, December 2019

On December 13, 2012, former UConn, East Carolina, and South Florida head coach Skip Holtz, son of legendary coach Lou Holtz, accepted an offer to become the head coach for the Louisiana Tech Bulldogs.

Holtz's first season in 2013 saw the Bulldogs move from the WAC to Conference USA. The 2013 campaign was a rebuilding year for the Bulldogs, finishing the season with a 4–8 record. However, the following season would see a big improvement. Holtz's 2014 Bulldogs went on to finish first in C-USA West at 9–5, with a 35–18 win over Illinois in the Heart of Dallas Bowl. In 2015 the Bulldogs continued their success, finishing 9–4 and winning the New Orleans Bowl over Arkansas State, 47–28. The 2016 Bulldogs finished with a 9–5 record and the C-USA West Division title, ultimately losing against East Division champion Western Kentucky in the conference championship game. Tech finish the season with their third consecutive bowl victory, defeating Navy in the Armed Forces Bowl by kicking a late field goal to win 48–45. In 2017 Louisiana Tech handily defeated SMU in the Frisco Bowl 51–10 in Frisco, Texas, extending their bowl winning streak to 4. Tech's fifth consecutive bowl win was in 2018 when the Bulldogs defeated Hawaii in the Hawaii Bowl 31–14. In 2019, the Bulldogs finished 10–3 and continued the FBS's longest bowl winning streak at 6 with another victory over a P5 team in the Independence Bowl, defeating Miami, 14–0. It was the first G5 shutout of a P5 team ever in a bowl game, as well as the first shutout in the Independence Bowl's 40+ year history. The Bulldogs went 5–5 in 2020, finishing with a 38–3 loss to Georgia Southern in the New Orleans Bowl. Holtz was fired after the 2021 season when the Bulldogs finished 3–9. He ended his tenure in Ruston with a 64–50 record, and 6 bowl victories.

=== Sonny Cumbie era (2022–present) ===
On November 30, 2021, Sonny Cumbie was named the 34th head coach of the Bulldogs. Cumbie previously served as the interim head coach, offensive coordinator, and quarterbacks coach at Texas Tech University. Cumbie signed a five-year contract with Louisiana Tech worth $4.85 million. Cumbie led the Bulldogs to an appearance in the 2024 Independence Bowl, losing 27–6 to Army.

== Conference affiliations ==
- Independent (1901–1914)
- Louisiana Intercollegiate Athletic Association (1915–1924)
- Southern Intercollegiate Athletic Association (1925–1938)
- Louisiana Intercollegiate Conference (1939–1947)
- Gulf States Conference (1948–1970)
- Southland Conference (1971–1986)
- NCAA Division I-AA independent (1987–1988)
- NCAA Division I-A independent (1989–1992)
- Big West Conference (1993–1995)
- NCAA Division I-A independent (1996–2000)
- Western Athletic Conference (2001–2012)
- Conference USA (2013–2025)
- Sun Belt Conference (2026–present)

== Championships ==
=== National championships ===
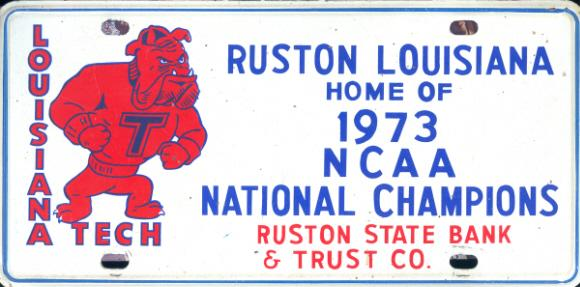
1973 National Champions license plate

Louisiana Tech claims three football national titles. From 1964 to 1972, members of Division II's predecessor, the NCAA College Division, were able to play in four regional bowl games were played following the conclusion of the regular season. In 1972, Louisiana Tech beat Tennessee Tech 35–0 in the Grantland Rice Bowl to win the Mideast Regional Championship. The Bulldogs finished the 1972 season undefeated at 12–0 and were subsequently named 1972 College Division National Champions by the National Football Foundation. Despite not playing in a regional championship, Delaware was named 1972 NCAA College Division National Champions by the Associated Press and United Press International, both of whom released their final polls prior to the bowls.

In 1973 the College Division split into Division II and III, where Tech became a member of Division II. The Division opted to do away with the bowls and began to host a playoff to determine a national champion. In the inaugural Division II football playoffs, Louisiana Tech beat Western Illinois in the quarterfinals and Boise State in the Pioneer Bowl semifinals. Tech advanced to the championship game to beat Western Kentucky 34–0 and finished the season with a 12–1 record as 1973 NCAA Division II National Champions. In 1974, the final UPI poll was released prior to the start of the playoffs, where the Bulldogs were ranked first. While they went on to lose to the winner of the playoff, Central Michigan, in the semifinals, Tech still claims the 1974 championship.

Year	Coach	Selector	Record
1972	Maxie Lambright	National Football Foundation College Division	12–0
1973	Maxie Lambright	NCAA Division II	12–1
1974	Maxie Lambright	United Press International College Division	11–1

=== Regional championships ===
Louisiana Tech won three regional football championships. From 1964 to 1972, four regional bowl games were played that led up to a wire service poll to determine the final champion of Division II's predecessor, the NCAA College Division. In 1968, Louisiana Tech beat Akron 33–13 in the Grantland Rice Bowl to become Mideast Regional Champions. In 1971, Louisiana Tech defeated Eastern Michigan 14–3 in the Pioneer Bowl to become Midwest Regional Champions. In 1972, Louisiana Tech beat Tennessee Tech 35–0 in the Grantland Rice Bowl to win the Mideast Regional Championship.

Year	Coach	Region	Record
1968	Maxie Lambright	Mideast	9–2
1971	Maxie Lambright	Mideast	9–2
1972	Maxie Lambright	Mideast	12–0

=== Conference championships ===
Louisiana Tech has won 25 conference championships, twenty outright and five shared. The Bulldogs have won 2 Louisiana Intercollegiate Athletic Association championships, 3 Louisiana Intercollegiate championships, 10 Gulf States championships, 8 Southland championships, and 2 WAC championships. It is of note that Tech finished with a 9–2 record in 1997, the best record of the 9 Division I-A Independents. In 1999 Tech finished with an 8–3 record, the only one of the 7 Division I-A Independents with a winning record.

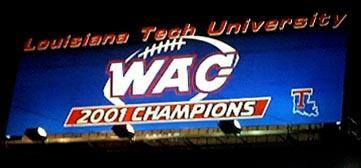
Louisiana Tech 2001 WAC Champions billboard

Season	Conference	Coach	Overall Record	Conference Record
1915	Louisiana Intercollegiate Athletic Association	Percy S. Prince	3–1–2	2–0–1
1921	Louisiana Intercollegiate Athletic Association	R. Foster Clark	6–0	3–0
1941	Louisiana Intercollegiate Conference	Joe Aillet	5–4–1	4–0
1945	Louisiana Intercollegiate Conference	Joe Aillet	6–4	3–1
1947	Louisiana Intercollegiate Conference	Joe Aillet	5–4	4–0
1949	Gulf States Conference	Joe Aillet	7–2	5–0
1952†	Gulf States Conference	Joe Aillet	6–1–2	3–0–2
1953†	Gulf States Conference	Joe Aillet	6–3	5–1
1955	Gulf States Conference	Joe Aillet	9–1	6–0
1957†	Gulf States Conference	Joe Aillet	6–4	4–1
1958†	Gulf States Conference	Joe Aillet	7–3	4–1
1959	Gulf States Conference	Joe Aillet	9–1	5–0
1960†	Gulf States Conference	Joe Aillet	8–2	4–1
1964	Gulf States Conference	Joe Aillet	9–1	5–0
1969	Gulf States Conference	Maxie Lambright	8–2	5–0
1971	Southland Conference	Maxie Lambright	9–2	4–1
1972	Southland Conference	Maxie Lambright	12–0	5–0
1973	Southland Conference	Maxie Lambright	12–1	5–0
1974	Southland Conference	Maxie Lambright	11–1	5–0
1977	Southland Conference	Maxie Lambright	9–1–2	4–0–1
1978	Southland Conference	Maxie Lambright	6–5	4–1
1982	Southland Conference	Billy Brewer	10–3	5–0
1984	Southland Conference	A.L. Williams	10–5	5–1
2001	Western Athletic Conference	Jack Bicknell III	7–5	7–1
2011	Western Athletic Conference	Sonny Dykes	8–5	6–1

† Co-champions

=== Division championships ===
In 2013, Louisiana Tech first joined a conference with football divisions, Conference USA, and since then the Bulldogs have won the C-USA West outright twice and shared once.

Season	Division	Coach	Opponent	CG result
2014	Conference USA - West	Skip Holtz	Marshall	L 23–26
2016	Conference USA - West	Skip Holtz	Western Kentucky	L 44–58
2019	Conference USA - West	Skip Holtz	N/A lost tiebreaker to UAB	
2026	Sun Belt Conference - West	Sonny Cumbie	TBD	TBD

== Postseason history ==
Louisiana Tech has produced an all-time postseason record of 19 wins, 8 losses, and 1 tie in 28 total appearances.

=== Division II postseason history ===
During its time in Division II, Louisiana Tech played in 9 Division II postseason games, with the Bulldogs accumulating a record of 7–2.

Date	Game	Opponent	Result
December 13, 1968	Grantland Rice Bowl	Akron	W 33–13
December 13, 1969	Grantland Rice Bowl	East Tennessee State	L 14–34
December 11, 1971	Pioneer Bowl	Eastern Michigan	W 14–3
December 10, 1972	Grantland Rice Bowl	Tennessee Tech	W 35–0
December 1, 1973	Quarterfinal	Western Illinois	W 18–13
December 8, 1973	Pioneer Bowl	Boise State	W 38–34
December 15, 1973	Camellia Bowl	Western Kentucky	W 34–0
November 30, 1974	Quarterfinal	Western Carolina	W 10–7
December 7, 1974	Pioneer Bowl	Central Michigan	L 14–35

=== Division I-AA playoff history ===
During its time in Division I-AA (now referred to as Football Championship Subdivision), Louisiana Tech played in six Division I-AA playoff games. The Bulldogs accumulated a 4–2 record in these games.

Season	Date	Game	Opponent	Result
1982	December 4	Quarterfinal	South Carolina State	W 38–3
1982	December 11	Semifinal	Delaware	L 0–17
1984	November 24	First Round	Mississippi Valley State	W 66–19
1984	December 1	Quarterfinal	Alcorn State	W 44–21
1984	December 8	Semifinal	Middle Tennessee	W 21–13
1984	December 15	Final	Montana State	L 6–19

=== Division I FBS bowl history ===
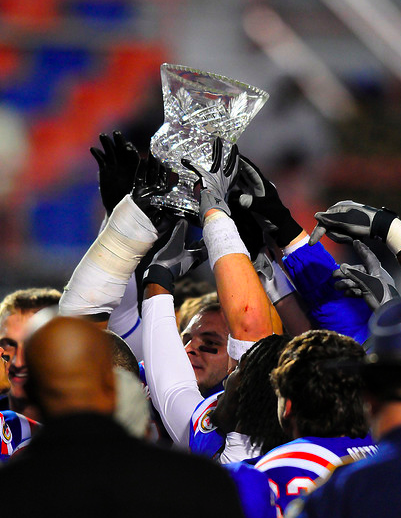
2008 Independence Bowl

Louisiana Tech has played in 15 Division I FBS bowl games, with the Bulldogs garnering a 9–5–1 record.

Season	Coach	Bowl	Opponent	Result
1977	Maxie Lambright	Independence Bowl	Louisville	W 24–14
1978	Maxie Lambright	Independence Bowl	East Carolina	L 13–35
1990	Joe Raymond Peace	Independence Bowl	Maryland	T 34–34
2001	Jack Bicknell Jr.	Humanitarian Bowl	Clemson	L 24–49
2008	Derek Dooley	Independence Bowl	Northern Illinois	W 17–10
2011	Sonny Dykes	Poinsettia Bowl	TCU	L 24–31
2014	Skip Holtz	Heart of Dallas Bowl	Illinois	W 35–18
2015	Skip Holtz	New Orleans Bowl	Arkansas State	W 47–28
2016	Skip Holtz	Armed Forces Bowl	Navy	W 48–45
2017	Skip Holtz	Frisco Bowl	SMU	W 51–10
2018	Skip Holtz	Hawaii Bowl	Hawaii	W 31–14
2019	Skip Holtz	Independence Bowl	Miami(FL)	W 14–0
2020	Skip Holtz	New Orleans Bowl	Georgia Southern	L 3–38
2024	Sonny Cumbie	Independence Bowl	Army	L 6–27
2025	Sonny Cumbie	Independence Bowl	Coastal Carolina	W 23–14

== Rivalries ==
=== Louisiana ===
Louisiana Tech and Louisiana first played in 1910, and continued to play off and on until the series became a near-yearly contest from 1924 to 2000. The two have been conference foes for much of their history, sharing time in the Southern Intercollegiate Athletic Association, Louisiana Intercollegiate Conference, Gulf States Conference, and Southland Conference. In 2000, following Tech's move to the WAC and Louisiana's move to the Sun Belt, the yearly contest ended, with other games happening in 2003, 2004, 2014, and 2015. However, the rivalry will resume yearly with Tech's 2026 move to the Sun Belt. Louisiana Tech currently leads the series 48–33–6 through the 2015 season.

=== Louisiana–Monroe ===
Louisiana Tech and Louisiana–Monroe first played in 1953 and played each season until 1991, with 4 additional meetings until 2000. The rivalry began as a conference game, when Louisiana–Monroe, then known as Northeast Louisiana State College, moved to the Gulf States Conference. When the conference dissolved at the end of the 1970 season, the two teams continued to meet yearly out of conference. The game briefly again became a conference matchup in 1982 following Northeast Louisiana's move to the Southland Conference, before becoming out of conference once again when Louisiana Tech left the conference following the 1986 season. Despite the two schools being locating just 35 miles apart, the Bulldogs and Warhawks have not played each other since 2000, with Tech winning 42–19 in Monroe. A potential bowl matchup in 2012 between the two almost happened in the Independence Bowl, though Louisiana Tech turned down the offer in an attempt to receive a more prestigious bid. Another potential matchup almost happened in 2020 but was cancelled due to COVID-19 concerns within the Warhawk program. On March 29, 2023, a home-and-home series was announced, with the two schools playing at Louisiana Tech in 2030 and at Louisiana–Monroe in 2031. However, the rivalry will resume yearly with Tech's move to the Sun Belt Conference in 2026. Louisiana Tech currently leads the series 29–13 through the 2000 season.

=== Northwestern State ===
Louisiana Tech and Northwestern State first played in 1907 and were annual opponents for most of the 20th century. In addition to sharing multiple conferences for long stretches of time, the rivalry was played in Shreveport during the Louisiana State Fair from 1946 to 1987. With Tech transitioning to Division I-A in 1989 the State Fair game was halted, and the two programs have rarely met since. Louisiana Tech won the latest meeting 80-6 in 2026. Louisiana Tech currently leads the series 50-17-5 through the 2026 season.

=== Southern Miss ===
Louisiana Tech and Southern Miss first played in 1935 and have played regularly since. The rivalry's nickname stems from the 1976 contest. Following a 23–22 Bulldog victory, Tech coach and USM alum Maxie Lambright declared the rivalry was “the finest rivalry in Dixie.” Tech and USM have been conference foes on multiple occasions, including sharing the Southern Intercollegiate Athletic Association from 1935 to 1941 as well as the Gulf States Conference from 1948 to 1952. The rivalry continued every year through 1972, and continued to be played semi-regularly until 1992. No further matchups would be scheduled until 2008, when Louisiana Tech Athletic Director and Head Coach Derek Dooley and Southern Miss Athletic Director Richard Giannini signed a four-game contract to renew the rivalry beginning in 2010. The rivalry became a conference matchup once again with Tech joining Conference USA in 2013, which continued each year until Southern Miss's move to the Sun Belt in 2022. A non-conference series was scheduled for 2025 and 2026, with Louisiana Tech winning the 54th and most recent meeting 30–20 in 2025. The rivalry will once again resume as a conference matchup when Tech moves to the Sun Belt Conference, on July 1st, 2026. Southern Miss leads the series 36–18 through the 2025 season.

== Home stadiums ==
=== Joe Aillet Stadium (1968–present) ===
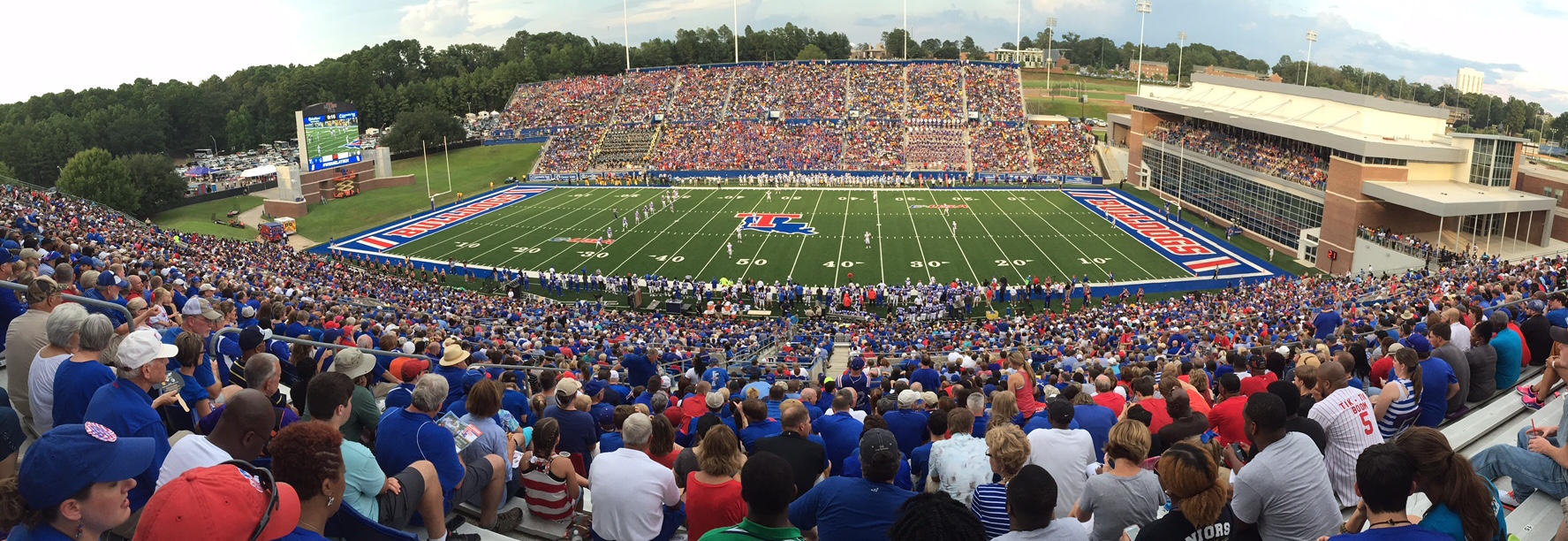
Joe Aillet Stadium

Louisiana Tech plays home games at Joe Aillet Stadium, which has garnered the nickname The Joe. The stadium is located on the campus of Louisiana Tech University in Ruston, Louisiana. Led by quarterback Terry Bradshaw, the Bulldogs christened Louisiana Tech Stadium with a 35–7 victory over East Carolina on September 28, 1968. The stadium was given its current namesake in 1972 to honor Hall of Fame coach Joe Aillet. The stadium opened with a capacity of 23,000, and additional seating was added to increase capacity to 30,600 in 1989. The stadium was upgraded in 1985 with the addition of the luxury sky box. In 1997 the stadium's attendance record of 28,714 was set against Northeast Louisiana. A new lighting system was installed in 2006. After playing the first 38 seasons in Aillet Stadium on natural grass, FieldTurf was installed in 2006. The FieldTurf was subsequently replaced in 2008 and again in 2015. In 2009 Louisiana Tech installed the largest high definition video board in the WAC covering 1,485 digital square feet behind the north end zone of the stadium at a cost of $2 million. In 2014 capacity was reduced to 27,717 while the area behind the south end zone of Joe Aillet Stadium was under construction. The $22 million 70,000 square foot Davison Athletics Complex was completed the following year increasing capacity to 28,019 for the 2015 season. In 2017 the stadium added 202 Eaton Ephesus LED fixtures provided and installed by Geo-Surfaces, a sports lighting company based in Baton Rouge, LA. In 2021, a multi-phase project was announced to upgrade and expand the stadium, including the addition of a new video board, a Champions Plaza adjacent to Stadium Drive on the north side of the stadium, and a ribbon board added to the facade of the Davison Athletics Complex on the south end. Most notably, the plans also include the construction of a new 22,300-square foot student-athlete access center to be located at the north end of the stadium. These plans are all expected to be finished within the next 5 to 10 years.

=== Independence Stadium (alternate, 1937–2012) ===
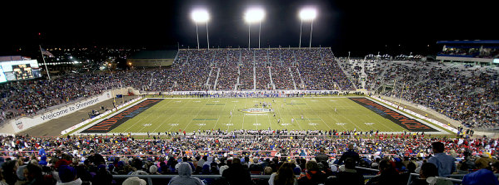
2008 Independence Bowl – Louisiana Tech 17, Northern Illinois 10

Louisiana Tech occasionally hosts games at Independence Stadium in Shreveport, Louisiana. The Bulldogs have played 73 games in Independence Stadium, boasting an all-time record of 46–24–3. Tech has hosted many teams in Independence Stadium during the regular season including Southern Miss, North Texas, Tulsa, Houston, Baylor, California, Texas A&M, SMU, Oklahoma State, Miami (FL), UTEP, and Grambling State. Most notably, Independence Stadium was the host of the yearly rivalry between the Bulldogs and Northwestern State from 1946 to 1987. Louisiana Tech's regular season home attendance record of 43,279 was set in 2003 against the Miami Hurricanes in a nationally televised game on ESPN. The 1990 Independence Bowl featuring Tech and Maryland drew 48,325 fans, the record attendance for a Louisiana Tech game in Independence Stadium. During the 2012 season, No. 23 Louisiana Tech hosted No. 22 Texas A&M in Independence Stadium on ESPNU in an epic battle in which the Aggies led by Johnny Manziel prevailed, 59–57. This game was ranked by ESPN as the No. 8 game of the 2012 season. The Bulldogs also have a long history with the Independence Bowl, having appeared 6 times in the yearly bowl game which is more than any other school. Their record in the Independence Bowl is 3–2–1, with their most recent appearance coming in 2024.

== Traditions ==
=== Band of Pride ===
The Band of Pride is the official marching band of Louisiana Tech University. Since its inception in 1906, the band has grown to approximately 200 members. The Band of Pride performs at all home football games, select road games, pep rallies, and various university events throughout the year.

=== Spirit of '88 ===
The Spirit of '88 Bulldog

Inside the Davison Athletics Complex behind the south end of Joe Aillet Stadium stands a bronze Bulldog statue named the Spirit of '88. At the beginning of each game, every player touches the statue before running onto the field, which is said to bring good luck to the Bulldogs. The statue commemorates the 1988 Bulldog football team, the last season in which Tech competed at the Division I-AA level. The 1988 team had to endure one of the most difficult schedules in school history while playing with only 65 scholarships, as opposed to the 95 allowed by Division I-A teams at the time. In what was the nation's 11th toughest schedule that year, the Bulldogs faced five I-A bowl teams including Houston, Florida State and Texas A&M. Those experiences likely played a key role in Tech finishing 4–6 the following year, its first in Division I-A, and then 8–3–1 in 1990 with an Independence Bowl berth. The Bulldogs eventually reeled off 18 consecutive home victories, tying the all-time stadium record set by head coach Maxie Lambright's great teams of the early 1970s.

=== Fire Bell ===
Fire Bell and Tech XX

In 1879, the Fire Bell was cast by L.M. Rumsey & Co. in St. Louis, Missouri. Founded in 1897, the Ruston Fire Department was called to fires by ringing the Fire Bell that hung in a wooden tower behind Perkins Drug Store located at 116 N. Trenton Street. The Fire Bell was used for many years in Ruston to alert the town of burning fires. After Joe Aillet Stadium was built in 1968, the old Fire Bell was transported to the stadium and placed behind the end zone. To commemorate the bravery of the bulldog that perished saving the lives of the two students in the burning house in 1899, the Fire Bell is rung before every home football game to call the Bulldogs to battle.

=== Tech ===
Tech is the name of the fawn and white lineage of English bulldogs which have served as Louisiana Tech's live mascot since 1930. In 1930, a rescued bullpup named Tech I was donated to serve as Louisiana Tech's first live mascot by the family of two football players, Henry and Thomas Matthews. Tech is owned by the Louisiana Tech Student Government Association and resides with either a faculty member or local alumnus selected by the SGA. The current live mascot is Tech XXII, who began his career in the Spring of 2018.

== Hall of Fame inductees ==
The following former players have been inducted in the respective Hall of Fames.

=== College Football Hall of Fame ===
- Terry Bradshaw (QB), inducted in 1996
- Fred Dean (DL), inducted in 2009
- Willie Roaf (T), inducted in 2014

=== Pro Football Hall of Fame ===
- Terry Bradshaw (QB), inducted in 1989
- Fred Dean (DE), inducted in 2008
- Willie Roaf (T), inducted in 2012

=== Canadian Football Hall of Fame ===
- Tom Hinton (G), inducted in 1991
- Matt Dunigan (QB), inducted in 2006

=== Arena Football Hall of Fame ===
- Eddie Brown (offensive specialist), inducted in 2011

== Individual accomplishments ==
=== Player awards ===
- Fred Biletnikoff Award
  Troy Edwards (1998)
- Ray Guy Award
  Ryan Allen (2011)
  Ryan Allen (2012)
- Sammy Baugh Trophy
  Colby Cameron (2012)
- Paul Warfield Trophy
  Troy Edwards (1998)

=== Heisman Trophy voting history ===
Year	Player	Place	Total Votes	1st	2nd	3rd
1999	Tim Rattay	10th	29	1	5	16

=== Consensus All-Americans ===
- Willie Roaf (OL), 1992
- Troy Edwards (WR), 1998
- Ryan Allen (P), 2012 (UNANIMOUS)

=== Retired numbers ===
Louisiana Tech Bulldogs retired numbers
No.	Player	Pos.	Tenure	No. ret.	Ref.
12	Terry Bradshaw	QB	1966–1969	1970	
70	Fred Dean	DE	1971–1974	2017	
71	Willie Roaf	OT	1989–1992	2001	

=== NFL draft ===
76 Louisiana Tech players have been drafted into the National Football League (NFL) since the league began holding drafts in 1936. Five Bulldogs have been selected in the first round including Terry Bradshaw, Roger Carr, Willie Roaf, Troy Edwards, and Vernon Butler; with Bradshaw being the overall number one pick in 1970.

=== Current NFL players ===
The following are former Louisiana Tech players in the NFL, as of September 8, 2025:

- Amik Robertson (CB), Detroit Lions
- L'Jarius Sneed (CB), Tennessee Titans
- Milton Williams (DT), New England Patriots
- Xavier Woods (S), Tennessee Titans

== Head coaches ==
Louisiana Tech has had 34 head coaches and one interim head coach since it started playing organized football in 1901. Two former head coaches, Joe Aillet and William Henry Dietz were inducted into the college football hall of fame. On November 30, 2021, Sonny Cumbie was named the 34th head coach of the Bulldogs. Cumbie previously served as the interim head coach, offensive coordinator and quarterbacks coach at Texas Tech University in 2021.

=== College Football Hall of Fame ===
- Joe Aillet, inducted in 1989
- William Henry Dietz, inducted in 2012

== Future non-conference opponents ==
Announced schedules as of September 18, 2026.

2026	2027	2028	2029	2030	2031	2032	2033	2034	2035
Northwestern State; Sep. 5	at Kansas; Aug. 28	at Texas; Aug. 26	at Alabama; Aug. 25	vs Baylor (Shreveport, LA)	at Tulsa; Sep. 20	at Ole Miss; Aug. 28	San Diego State; Sep. 24	at San Diego State; Sep. 23	at Army; Sep. 15
at LSU; Sep. 12	Nicholls; Sep. 4	Mississippi Valley State; Sep. 2	Central Arkansas; Sep. 8						Bowling Green; Sep. 22
at Baylor; Sep. 19	Tulsa; Sep. 25	at North Texas; Sep. 9	at Tulsa; Sep. 22						
Army; Oct. 3	at NC State; Oct. 12	at Mississippi State; Sep. 16							

== See also ==
- List of NCAA Division I FBS football programs
