= 2015 New Orleans Bowl =

2015 R+L Carriers New Orleans Bowl
- 15th New Orleans Bowl
Arkansas State Red Wolves	Louisiana Tech Bulldogs
(9–3)	(8–4)
Sun Belt	C-USA
28	47
Head coach: Blake Anderson	Head coach: Skip Holtz
	1	2	3	4	Total
Arkansas State	3	14	3	8	28
Louisiana Tech	10	7	17	13	47
- Date: December 19, 2015
- Season: 2015
- Stadium: Mercedes-Benz Superdome
- Location: New Orleans, Louisiana
- MVP: Louisiana Tech RB Kenneth Dixon
- Favorite: La. Tech by 2
- Referee: Adam Savoie (American)
- Attendance: 32,487
- Payout: US$TBD

United States TV coverage
- Network: ESPN/ESPN Radio
- Announcers: Adam Amin, Kelly Stouffer & Dr. Jerry Punch (ESPN); Bill Rosinski, David Norrie, & Joe Schad (ESPN Radio)

The 2015 New Orleans Bowl was a postseason American college football bowl game played on December 19, 2015 at the Mercedes-Benz Superdome in New Orleans, Louisiana. The 15th edition of the New Orleans Bowl featured the Louisiana Tech Bulldogs from Conference USA against the Arkansas State Red Wolves of the Sun Belt Conference. It began at 8:00 p.m. CST and air on ESPN. It was one of the 2015–16 bowl games that concludes the 2015 FBS football season. Sponsored by freight shipping company R+L Carriers, it was officially known as the R+L Carriers New Orleans Bowl.

== Teams ==
The game featured the Louisiana Tech Bulldogs against the Arkansas State Red Wolves. It was the 38th overall meeting between the schools, with Louisiana Tech leading the series 25–12 before this game (both had previously been in-conference foes in the Southland Conference and Big West Conference before Louisiana Tech joined the Western Athletic Conference and later Conference USA and Arkansas State joined the Sun Belt). The last meeting between these two teams was in 1998, when the Bulldogs beat the Indians 69–21 in Jonesboro.

=== Arkansas State Red Wolves ===
Sources told ESPN reporter Brett McMurphy that the Red Wolves had officially been invited to the game and accepted.

This was the Red Wolves' second trip to the New Orleans Bowl; they (at the time known as the Indians) had previously played in the 2005 game, losing to the Southern Miss Golden Eagles by a score of 31–19. Notably, that game was played at Cajun Field in nearby Lafayette because of damage to the Superdome done by Hurricane Katrina.

=== Louisiana Tech Bulldogs ===
This was the Bulldogs' second straight bowl appearance under third-year head coach Skip Holtz, following a 35–18 victory over Illinois in the 2014 Heart of Dallas Bowl. Holtz had a 3–3 career record in bowl games as head coach at Louisiana Tech, South Florida and East Carolina. The Louisiana Tech program entered 3–3–1 all-time in FBS bowl games.

== Game summary ==
=== Scoring summary ===
Scoring summary

Quarter	Time	Drive			Team	Scoring information	Score	
Quarter	Time	Plays	Yards	TOP	Team	Scoring information	ARST	La. Tech
1	12:00	7	88	3:00	La. Tech	Kenneth Dixon 9-yard touchdown reception from Jeff Driskel, Jonathan Barnes kick good	0	7
1	6:38	15	56	5:22	ARST	35-yard field goal by JD Houston	3	7
1	1:55	5	18	1:52	La. Tech	50-yard field goal by Jonathan Barnes	3	10
2	12:06	5	63	2:53	La. Tech	Trent Taylor 13-yard touchdown reception from Jeff Driskel, Jonathan Barnes kick good	3	17
2	7:22	13	91	4:44	ARST	Warren Wand 1-yard touchdown run, JD Houston kick good	10	17
2	0:18	4	25	1:14	ARST	Fredi Knighten 1-yard touchdown run, JD Houston kick good	17	17
3	10:00	9	57	3:02	La. Tech	20-yard field goal by Jonathan Barnes	17	20
3	8:17	7	55	1:43	ARST	37-yard field goal by JD Houston	20	20
3	5:09	5	84	3:08	La. Tech	Kenneth Dixon 59-yard touchdown reception from Jeff Driskel, Jonathan Barnes kick good	20	27
3	0:18	8	90	3:08	La. Tech	Kenneth Dixon 8-yard touchdown run, Jonathan Barnes kick good	20	34
4	13:45	5	16	1:15	La. Tech	28-yard field goal by Jonathan Barnes	20	37
4	10:52	4	88	2:02	La. Tech	Kenneth Dixon 4-yard touchdown run, Jonathan Barnes kick good	20	44
4	10:38	0	0	0:14	ARST	Blaise Taylor 98-yard kick return, 2-point pass good	28	44
4	1:31	16	70	9:07	La. Tech	22-yard field goal by Jonathan Barnes	28	47
"TOP" = time of possession. For other American football terms, see Glossary of American football.							28	47

=== Statistics ===
	1	2	3	4	Total
Red Wolves	3	14	3	8	28
Bulldogs	10	7	17	13	47

Statistics	ARST	La. Tech
First downs	23	26
Plays–yards	68–323	74–687
Rushes–yards	39–177	36–229
Passing yards	146	458
Passing: Comp–Att–Int	15–29–2	26–38–0
Time of possession	25:13	34:47

Team	Category	Player	Statistics
ARST	Passing	Fredi Knighten	14/28, 137 yds, 2 INT
ARST	Rushing	Warren Wand	12 car, 66 yds, 1 TD
ARST	Receiving	Tres Houston	3 rec, 47 yds
La. Tech	Passing	Jeff Driskel	26/38, 458 yds, 3 TD
La. Tech	Rushing	Boston Scott	4 car, 106 yds
La. Tech	Receiving	Trent Taylor	10 rec, 149 yds, 1 TD
