= 1973 Pioneer Bowl =

Louisiana Tech Bulldogs	Boise State Broncos
(10–1)	(10–2)
Southland Conference	Big Sky Conference
38	34
Head coach: Maxie Lambright	Head coach: Tony Knap
	1	2	3	4	Total
Louisiana Tech	7	10	7	14	38
Boise State	14	0	6	14	34
- Date: December 8, 1973
- Season: 1973
- Stadium: Memorial Stadium
- Location: Wichita Falls, Texas
- Attendance: 13,000

The 1973 Pioneer Bowl was a college football bowl game in Texas, played between the Louisiana Tech Bulldogs and Boise State Broncos at Memorial Stadium in Wichita Falls. The third edition of the Pioneer Bowl, it was one of two semifinals in the inaugural NCAA Division II playoffs played on December 8.

== Notable participants ==
Notable participants for Louisiana Tech include Fred Dean, Roger Carr, Pat Tilley, Roland Harper, Mike Barber, John Henry White, Billy Ryckman, Maxie Lambright, Mickey Slaughter, Pat Patterson, and Pat Collins.

== Game summary ==
=== Scoring summary ===
Scoring summary

Quarter	Time	Drive			Team	Scoring information	Score	
Quarter	Time	Plays	Yards	TOP	Team	Scoring information	La. Tech	BSU
1			49		BSU	Jim McMillan 7-yard touchdown run, Morris kick good	0	7
1			59		BSU	Jim McMillan 8-yard touchdown run, Morris kick good	0	14
1					La. Tech	Charles McDaniel 49-yard touchdown run, Jerry Pope kick good	7	14
2					La. Tech	26-yard field goal by Jerry Pope	10	14
2	0:02		42		La. Tech	Charles McDaniel 2-yard touchdown run, Jerry Pope kick good	17	14
3					BSU	Dave Nicely 35-yard touchdown reception from Jim McMillan, kick failed	17	20
3	0:29	8	80		La. Tech	Roger Carr 59-yard touchdown reception from Denny Duron, Jerry Pope kick good	24	20
4	11:42				BSU	John Davis or Dave Smith or J. Smith 80-yard touchdown reception from Jim McMillan, Morris kick good	24	27
4			47		La. Tech	Denny Duron 1-yard touchdown run, Jerry Pope kick good	31	27
4	3:43				BSU	Don Hutt 31-yard touchdown reception from Jim McMillan, Morris kick good	31	34
4	0:12	11	55		La. Tech	Roger Carr 21-yard touchdown reception from Denny Duron, Jerry Pope kick good	38	34
"TOP" = time of possession. For other American football terms, see Glossary of American football.							38	34

=== Statistics ===
	1	2	3	4	Total
Bulldogs	7	10	7	14	38
Broncos	14	0	6	14	34

Statistics	La. Tech	BSU
First downs	14	22
Total offense, yards	423	414
Rushes-yards (net)	49–165	37–40
Passing yards (net)	258	374
Passes, Comp-Att-Int	16–30–0	26–42–2
Time of Possession		

Team	Category	Player	Statistics
La. Tech	Passing	Denny Duron	16/30, 259 yds, 2 TD
La. Tech	Rushing	Charles McDaniel	20 car, 116 yds, 2 TD
La. Tech	Receiving	Roger Carr	5 rec, 117 yds, 2 TD
BSU	Passing		
BSU	Rushing		
BSU	Receiving		
