= 1974 Pioneer Bowl =

Central Michigan Chippewas	Louisiana Tech Bulldogs
(10–1)	(11–0)
Independent	Southland Conference
35	14
Head coach: Roy Kramer	Head coach: Maxie Lambright
	1	2	3	4	Total
Central Michigan	0	14	7	14	35
Louisiana Tech	0	0	0	14	14
- Date: December 7, 1974
- Season: 1974
- Stadium: Memorial Stadium
- Location: Wichita Falls, Texas
- MVP: Mike Franckowiak (CMU); Rick Newsome (CMU)
- Attendance: 12,200

The 1974 Pioneer Bowl was a college football bowl game in Texas, played between the Central Michigan Chippewas and Louisiana Tech Bulldogs at Memorial Stadium in Wichita Falls. The fourth edition of the Pioneer Bowl, it was one of two semifinals in the NCAA Division II playoffs played on December 7.

== Game summary ==
=== Scoring summary ===
Scoring summary

Quarter	Time	Drive			Team	Scoring information	Score	
Quarter	Time	Plays	Yards	TOP	Team	Scoring information	CMU	La. Tech
2					CMU	Walt Hodges 1-yard touchdown run, Mike Franckowiak kick good	7	0
2					CMU	Mike Franckowiak 1-yard touchdown run, Mike Franckowiak kick good	14	0
3					CMU	Dick Dunham 1-yard touchdown run, Mike Franckowiak kick good	21	0
4					CMU	Dick Dunham 3-yard touchdown run, Mike Franckowiak kick good	28	0
4					CMU	Matt Means 5-yard touchdown reception from Mike Franckowiak, Mike Franckowiak kick good	35	0
4					La. Tech	Arry Moody 5-yard touchdown reception from Steve Haynes, Jerry Pope kick good	35	7
4					La. Tech	Arry Moody 15-yard touchdown run, Jerry Pope kick good	35	14
"TOP" = time of possession. For other American football terms, see Glossary of American football.							35	14

=== Statistics ===
	1	2	3	4	Total
Chippewas	0	14	7	14	35
Bulldogs	0	0	0	14	14

Statistics	CMU	La. Tech
First downs	18	14
Total offense, yards	366	308
Rushes-yards (net)	67–277	38–143
Passing yards (net)	89	165
Passes, Comp-Att-Int	7–14–1	13–31–6
Time of Possession		

Team	Category	Player	Statistics
CMU	Passing	Mike Franckowiak	7/14, 89 yds, 1 TD, 1 INT
CMU	Rushing	Walt Hodges	21 car, 118 yds, 1 TD
CMU	Receiving	Matt Means	7 rec, 89 yds, 1 TD
La. Tech	Passing	Steve Haynes	10/23, 139 yds, 1 TD, 5 INT
La. Tech	Rushing	Roland Harper	10 car, 45 yds
La. Tech	Receiving	Arry Moody	2 rec, 45 yds, 1 TD
