= 2018 Hawaii Bowl =

College football bowl game

2018 SoFi Hawaii Bowl
- 17th Hawaii Bowl
Hawaii Rainbow Warriors	Louisiana Tech Bulldogs
(8–5)	(7–5)
Mountain West	C-USA
14	31
Head coach: Nick Rolovich	Head coach: Skip Holtz
	1	2	3	4	Total
Hawaii	0	7	0	7	14
Louisiana Tech	3	0	21	7	31
- Date: December 22, 2018
- Season: 2018
- Stadium: Aloha Stadium
- Location: Honolulu, Hawaii
- MVP: Jaylon Ferguson (DE, Louisiana Tech) & Kendall Hune (DE, Hawaii)
- Favorite: Hawaii by 1
- Referee: Greg Sujack (MAC)
- Attendance: 30,911
- Payout: US$1,000,000

United States TV coverage
- Network: ESPN & ESPN Radio
- Announcers: Beth Mowins, Kirk Morrison and Allison Williams (ESPN); Kevin Winter and Brad Edwards (ESPN Radio)

The 2018 Hawaii Bowl was a college football bowl game being played on December 22, 2018, in Honolulu, Hawaii. It was the 17th edition of the Hawaii Bowl, and one of the 2018–19 bowl games concluding the 2018 FBS football season. This was the first time since 2007 that the bowl was not played on Christmas Eve. Sponsored by the SoFi personal finance company, the game was officially called the SoFi Hawaii Bowl.

== Teams ==
The game was played between the Hawaii Rainbow Warriors of the Mountain West Conference and the Louisiana Tech Bulldogs of Conference USA (C–USA). The teams had faced each other 10 times, with Hawaii holding an 8–2 lead in the series; both teams previously were members of the Western Athletic Conference.

This was Louisiana Tech's first trip to the Hawaii Bowl; it was Hawaii's eighth time in this bowl.

=== Hawaii Rainbow Warriors ===
Hawaii secured a spot in the bowl with a win on November 17 over the UNLV Rebels, ending a four-game losing streak and assuring the Rainbow Warriors of a bowl-eligible winning record, as they reached 7–5 with one game left to play. Hawaii subsequently defeated the San Diego State Aztecs, ending the regular season with an 8–5 overall record, 5–3 in conference. The Rainbow Warriors' participation in the Hawaii Bowl was confirmed by bowl organizers on November 28.

=== Louisiana Tech Bulldogs ===
Louisiana Tech announced their acceptance of a Hawaii Bowl bid on November 28. The Bulldogs compiled a 7–5 regular season record, 5–3 in conference.

== Game summary ==
=== Scoring summary ===
Scoring summary

Quarter	Time	Drive			Team	Scoring information	Score	
Quarter	Time	Plays	Yards	TOP	Team	Scoring information	HAW	LT
1	1:08	9	44	3:04	LT	24-yard field goal by Bailey Hale	0	3
2	8:20	7	71	3:21	HAW	Jason-Matthew Sharsh 24-yard touchdown reception from Chevan Cordeiro, Ryan Meskell kick good	7	3
3	10:27	3	51	0:32	LT	Israel Tucker 5-yard touchdown run, Bailey Hale kick good	7	10
3	4:44	7	92	2:55	LT	Jaquis Dancy 58-yard touchdown reception from J'Mar Smith, Bailey Hale kick good	7	17
3	0:55	4	65	2:05	LT	J'Mar Smith 4-yard touchdown run, Bailey Hale kick good	7	24
4	6:14	7	38	2:39	HAW	Marcus Armstrong-Brown 7-yard touchdown reception from Cole McDonald, Ryan Meskell kick good	14	24
4	3:45	6	65	2:29	LT	Kam McKnight 39-yard touchdown run, Bailey Hale kick good	14	31
"TOP" = time of possession. For other American football terms, see Glossary of American football.							14	31

=== Statistics ===
	1	2	3	4	Total
Rainbow Warriors	0	7	0	7	14
Bulldogs	3	0	21	7	31

Statistics	HAW	LT
First downs	17	23
Plays–yards	66–226	70–453
Rushes–yards	32–58	38–168
Passing yards	168	285
Passing: Comp–Att–Int	17–34–3	19–31–1
Time of possession	29:23	30:37

Team	Category	Player	Statistics
Hawaii	Passing	Cole McDonald	10/20, 85 yds, 1 TD, 2 INT
Hawaii	Rushing	Fred Holly III	9 car, 57 yds
Hawaii	Receiving	Jason-Matthew Sharsh	5 rec, 67 yds, 1 TD
Louisiana Tech	Passing	J'Mar Smith	19/31, 285 yds, 1 TD, 1 INT
Louisiana Tech	Rushing	Jaqwis Dancy	15 car, 57 yds
Louisiana Tech	Receiving	Teddy Veal	8 rec, 107 yds
