= Louisiana Tech–Northwestern State football rivalry =

American college football rivalry

- Louisiana Tech Bulldogs Northwestern State Demons
- Sport: Football
- First meeting: 1907; Louisiana Industrial, 43–4
- Latest meeting: September 5, 2026; Louisiana Tech, 80–6
- Trophy: None

Statistics
- Total meetings: 81
- All-time series: Louisiana Tech leads, 56–20–5
- Largest victory: Louisiana Tech, 80–6 (2026)
- Longest win streak: Louisiana Tech, 9 (1945–1952)
- Longest unbeaten streak: Louisiana Tech, 11 (1944–1952)
- Current win streak: Louisiana Tech, 3 (2017–present)
- Locations in Louisiana

The Louisiana Tech–Northwestern State football rivalry is an American college football rivalry between the Louisiana Tech Bulldogs and the Northwestern State Demons. The rivalry stems from the proximity of the two colleges, as well as the two teams sharing multiple conferences including the LIAA (1915–24), the SIAA (1928–38), the Louisiana Intercollegiate Conference (1942–57), and the Gulf States Conference (1948–70). The Demons and the Bulldogs often met at the Louisiana State Fair in Shreveport, playing there annually from 1946 to 1987. The game has been infrequently played since 1987, following Louisiana Tech's transition to the NCAA's Football Bowl Subdivision.

== History and notable games ==
The two teams have met 81 times on the football field, with Louisiana Tech currently holding a 56–20–5 edge in the all-time series. For the majority of the rivalry, games were held during the State Fair of Louisiana in Shreveport, which is about 75 miles from both Ruston and Natchitoches.

- 1907: Louisiana Industrial and Louisiana State Normal meet for the first time in Natchitoches, with Louisiana Industrial winning 43–4.
- November 4, 1911: The two schools meet for the first time in Shreveport, with Louisiana Industrial winning 39–0.
- October 26, 1946: While the two teams had met in Shreveport in the past, this game began a 31-year streak of playing at the state fair. Louisiana Tech beat Louisiana State Normal 14–7.
- October 19, 1968: With 25 seconds remaining, Tech quarterback Terry Bradshaw completes a touchdown pass to Ken Liberto, winning 42–39 and snapping a 2 loss streak against the Demons.
- October 24, 1987: In the final game in the Shreveport series, Louisiana Tech beat Northwestern State 23–0. This would be the last game between the two schools for many years, as Tech would begin transitioning to FBS the following year.
- September 20, 2014: After a 20-year hiatus, the two schools met in Ruston, with Northwestern State winning 30–27.

== Game results ==
Louisiana Tech victories	Northwestern State victories	Tie games

No.	Date	Location	Winner	Score
1	October 25, 1907	Ruston, LA	Louisiana Industrial	43–4
2	November 19, 1909	Ruston, LA	Louisiana Industrial	45–0
3	November 19, 1910	Ruston, LA	Louisiana Industrial	32–0
4	November 4, 1911	Ruston, LA	Louisiana Industrial	39–0
5	November 3, 1913	Ruston, LA	Louisiana Industrial	40–0
6	November 6, 1915	Shreveport, LA	Louisiana Industrial	20–7
7	November 4, 1916	Shreveport, LA	Louisiana Industrial	24–0
8	November 3, 1917	Shreveport, LA	Louisiana State Normal	7–0
9	November 8, 1919	Ruston, LA	Louisiana State Normal	27–0
10	October 30, 1920	Ruston, LA	Louisiana State Normal	12–0
11	November 19, 1921	Ruston, LA	Louisiana Tech	17–0
12	October 19, 1922	Ruston, LA	Tie	0–0
13	November 10, 1923	Ruston, LA	Louisiana Tech	33–2
14	October 2, 1926	Ruston, LA	Louisiana Tech	28–0
15	October 15, 1927	Natchitoches, LA	Louisiana Tech	33–0
16	October 13, 1928	Ruston, LA	Louisiana State Normal	6–0
17	November 1, 1929	Ruston, LA	Tie	0–0
18	October 31, 1930	Natchitoches, LA	Louisiana State Normal	19–14
19	October 30, 1931	Ruston, LA	Louisiana Tech	18–2
20	October 28, 1932	Natchitoches, LA	Louisiana State Normal	33–0
21	October 28, 1933	Ruston, LA	Louisiana Tech	6–0
22	October 26, 1934	Natchitoches, LA	Louisiana State Normal	6–0
23	October 26, 1935	Ruston, LA	Louisiana Tech	33–6
24	October 23, 1936	Ruston, LA	Louisiana Tech	32–0
25	October 23, 1937	Shreveport, LA	Louisiana Tech	14–0
26	October 22, 1938	Shreveport, LA	Louisiana State Normal	7–6
27	October 21, 1939	Shreveport, LA	Louisiana State Normal	26–0
28	October 19, 1940	Shreveport, LA	Louisiana State Normal	13–0
29	October 18, 1941	Shreveport, LA	Louisiana Tech	10–0
30	October 24, 1942	Shreveport, LA	Louisiana State Normal	10–6
31	October 28, 1944	Natchitoches, LA	Louisiana Tech	21–7
32	November 11, 1944	Ruston, LA	Tie	0–0
33	October 27, 1945	Ruston, LA	Louisiana Tech	18–7
34	November 10, 1945	Natchitoches, LA	Louisiana Tech	7–2
35	October 26, 1946	Shreveport, LA	Louisiana Tech	14–7
36	October 25, 1947	Shreveport, LA	Louisiana Tech	24–0
37	October 23, 1948	Shreveport, LA	Louisiana Tech	10–7
38	October 21, 1949	Shreveport, LA	Louisiana Tech	28–21
39	October 21, 1950	Shreveport, LA	Louisiana Tech	15–7
40	October 20, 1951	Shreveport, LA	Louisiana Tech	21–6
41	October 18, 1952	Shreveport, LA	Louisiana Tech	22–0

No.	Date	Location	Winner	Score
42	October 23, 1953	Shreveport, LA	Northwestern State	15–7
43	October 23, 1954	Shreveport, LA	Louisiana Tech	13–6
44	October 22, 1955	Shreveport, LA	Louisiana Tech	21–20
45	October 20, 1956	Shreveport, LA	Tie	0–0
46	October 19, 1957	Shreveport, LA	Louisiana Tech	20–13
47	October 18, 1958	Shreveport, LA	Northwestern State	18–14
48	October 24, 1959	Shreveport, LA	Louisiana Tech	27–14
49	October 22, 1960	Shreveport, LA	Louisiana Tech	13–7
50	October 21, 1961	Shreveport, LA	Northwestern State	19–7
51	October 20, 1962	Shreveport, LA	Northwestern State	19–2
52	October 18, 1963	Shreveport, LA	Louisiana Tech	27–13
53	October 24, 1964	Shreveport, LA	Louisiana Tech	16–7
54	October 23, 1965	Shreveport, LA	Louisiana Tech	42–14
55	October 22, 1966	Shreveport, LA	Northwestern State	28–7
56	October 21, 1967	Shreveport, LA	Northwestern State	7–0
57	October 19, 1968	Shreveport, LA	Louisiana Tech	42–39
58	October 18, 1969	Shreveport, LA	Louisiana Tech	42–21
59	October 24, 1970	Shreveport, LA	Northwestern State	20–17
60	October 23, 1971	Shreveport, LA	Louisiana Tech	33–21
61	October 21, 1972	Shreveport, LA	Louisiana Tech	20–16
62	October 20, 1973	Shreveport, LA	Louisiana Tech	26–7
63	October 19, 1974	Shreveport, LA	Louisiana Tech	34–0
64	October 18, 1975	Shreveport, LA	Louisiana Tech	41–14
65	October 23, 1976	Shreveport, LA	Louisiana Tech	35–6
66	October 22, 1977	Shreveport, LA	Louisiana Tech	30–8
67	October 20, 1978	Shreveport, LA	Louisiana Tech	45–20
68	October 20, 1979	Shreveport, LA	Northwestern State	25–21
69	October 18, 1980	Shreveport, LA	Louisiana Tech	27–23
70	October 24, 1981	Shreveport, LA	Louisiana Tech	37–33
71	October 23, 1982	Shreveport, LA	Louisiana Tech	33–0
72	October 22, 1983	Shreveport, LA	Louisiana Tech	21–10
73	October 20, 1984	Shreveport, LA	Louisiana Tech	5–0
74	October 26, 1985	Shreveport, LA	Louisiana Tech	33–17
75	October 25, 1986	Shreveport, LA	Tie	13–13
76	October 24, 1987	Shreveport, LA	Louisiana Tech	23–0
77	November 5, 1994	Ruston, LA	Louisiana Tech	38–28
78	September 20, 2014	Ruston, LA	Northwestern State	30–27
79	September 2, 2017	Ruston, LA	Louisiana Tech	52–24
80	September 9, 2023	Ruston, LA	Louisiana Tech	51–21
81	Septemeber 5, 2026	Ruston, LA	Louisiana Tech	80–6
Series: Louisiana Tech leads 56–20–5

== See also ==
- List of NCAA college football rivalry games
