= Louisiana Intercollegiate Athletic Association =

College sports conference in Louisiana, 1912–1925

The Louisiana Intercollegiate Athletic Association (LIAA) was an intercollegiate athletic conference that existed from 1912 to 1925. The conference's members were located in the state of Louisiana.

== Members ==
Institution	Location	Founded	Nickname	Joined	Left	Current conference
Centenary College of Louisiana	Shreveport, Louisiana	1825	Gentlemen	1921	1925	SCAC
Louisiana College	Pineville, Louisiana	1906	Wildcats	1914	1925	RRAC; SAC in football
Louisiana State Normal School	Natchitoches, Louisiana	1884	Demons	1914	1925	Southland
Louisiana Polytechnic Institute Louisiana Industrial Institute	Ruston, Louisiana	1894	Bulldogs	1915	1925	Sun Belt
Southwestern Louisiana Institute Southwestern Louisiana Industrial Institute	Lafayette, Louisiana	1898	Bulldogs	1915	1925	Sun Belt
St. Charles College	Grand Coteau, Louisiana	1837	unknown	1914	1922	closed in 1922

== Champions ==
- 1912 – Unknown
- 1913 – Unknown
- 1914 – Southwestern Louisiana Industrial
- 1915 – Southwestern Louisiana Industrial
- 1916 – Southwestern Louisiana Industrial
- 1917 – Southwestern Louisiana Industrial
- 1918 – Unknown
- 1919 – Unknown
- 1920 – Louisiana Normal
- 1921 – Louisiana Tech
- 1922 – Centenary
- 1923 – Centenary
- 1924 – Southwestern Louisiana
- 1925 – Southwestern Louisiana

== See also ==
- List of defunct college football conferences
