= List of Louisiana Ragin' Cajuns football seasons =

The following is a list of Louisiana Ragin' Cajuns football seasons for the football team that has represented University of Louisiana at Lafayette in NCAA competition.

== Season-by-season records ==
| Season | Conference | Wins | Losses | Ties | Postseason results | Notes |
Louisiana Ragin Cajuns
| 2025 | Sun Belt | 6 | 7 | | Lost 68 Ventures Bowl 13–20 vs. Delaware Fightin' Blue Hens | |
| 2024 | Sun Belt | 10 | 4 | | Lost New Mexico Bowl 3–34 vs. TCU Horned Frogs | Sun Belt West Division champions; lost Sun Belt championship game 3–31 against Marshall |
| 2023 | Sun Belt | 6 | 7 | | Lost New Orleans Bowl 31–34^{OT} vs. Jacksonville State Gamecocks | |
| 2022 | Sun Belt | 6 | 7 | | Lost Independence Bowl 16–23 vs. Houston Cougars | |
| 2021 | Sun Belt | 13 | 1 | | Won New Orleans Bowl 36–21 vs. Marshall Thundering Herd | Won Sun Belt championship game 24–16 against Appalachian State; ended season No. 16 in AP Poll, No. 18 in coaches' poll, No. 23 in College Football Playoff rankings |
| 2020 | Sun Belt | 10 | 1 | | Won First Responder Bowl 31–24 vs. UTSA Roadrunners | Sun Belt co-champions; conference championship game against Coastal Carolina canceled due to a Coastal Carolina player's positive COVID-19 test; ended season No. 15 in AP Poll, No. 17 in coaches' poll, No. 19 in College Football Playoff rankings |
| 2019 | Sun Belt | 11 | 3 | | Won LendingTree Bowl 27–17 vs. Miami RedHawks | Sun Belt West Division champions; lost Sun Belt championship game 38–45 against Appalachian State |
| 2018 | Sun Belt | 7 | 7 | | Lost Cure Bowl 24–41 vs. Tulane Green Wave | Sun Belt West Division champions; lost Sun Belt inaugural championship game 30–19 against Appalachian State |
| 2017 | Sun Belt | 5 | 7 | | | |
| 2016 | Sun Belt | 6 | 7 | | Lost New Orleans Bowl 21–28 vs. Southern Miss | |
| 2015 | Sun Belt | 4 | 8 | | | |
| 2014 | Sun Belt | 7 | 4 | | Won New Orleans Bowl 16–3 vs. Nevada | Vacated 2 wins |
| 2013 | Sun Belt | 1 | 4 | | Vacated New Orleans Bowl | Vacated 8 wins; Sun Belt co-champions (vacated) |
| 2012 | Sun Belt | 5 | 4 | | Won New Orleans Bowl 43–34 vs. East Carolina | Vacated 4 wins |
| 2011 | Sun Belt | 1 | 4 | | Vacated New Orleans Bowl | Vacated 8 wins |
| 2010 | Sun Belt | 3 | 9 | | | |
| 2009 | Sun Belt | 6 | 6 | | | |
| 2008 | Sun Belt | 6 | 6 | | | |
| 2007 | Sun Belt | 3 | 9 | | | |
| 2006 | Sun Belt | 6 | 6 | | | |
| 2005 | Sun Belt | 6 | 5 | | | Sun-Belt co-champions |
| 2004 | Sun Belt | 4 | 7 | | | |
| 2003 | Sun Belt | 4 | 8 | | | |
| 2002 | Sun Belt | 3 | 9 | | | |
| 2001 | Sun Belt | 3 | 8 | | | |
| 2000 | Independent | 1 | 10 | | | |
| 1999 | Independent | 2 | 9 | | | |
| 1998 | Independent | 2 | 9 | | | |
| 1997 | Independent | 1 | 10 | | | |
| 1996 | Independent | 5 | 6 | | | |
| 1995 | Big West | 6 | 5 | | | |
| 1994 | Big West | 6 | 5 | | | Big West co-champions |
| 1993 | Big West | 8 | 3 | | | Big West co-champions |
| 1992 | Independent | 2 | 9 | | | |
| 1991 | Independent | 2 | 8 | 1 | | |
| 1990 | Independent | 5 | 6 | | | |
| 1989 | Independent | 7 | 4 | | | |
| 1988 | Independent | 6 | 5 | | | |
| 1987 | Independent | 6 | 5 | | | |
| 1986 | Independent | 6 | 5 | | | |
| 1985 | Independent | 4 | 7 | | | |
| 1984 | Independent | 6 | 5 | | | |
| 1983 | Independent | 4 | 6 | | | |
| 1982 | Independent | 7 | 3 | 1 | | |
| 1981 | Southland | 1 | 9 | 1 | | |
| 1980 | Southland | 7 | 4 | | | |
| 1979 | Southland | 4 | 7 | | | |
| 1978 | Southland | 3 | 8 | | | |
| 1977 | Southland | 6 | 4 | 2 | | |
| 1976 | Southland | 9 | 2 | | | |
| 1975 | Southland | 6 | 5 | | | |
| 1974 | Southland | 2 | 9 | | | |
| 1973 | Southland | 0 | 10 | | | |
| 1972 | Southland | 5 | 6 | | | |
| 1971 | Southland | 5 | 4 | 1 | | |
| 1970 | Gulf States | 9 | 3 | | Lost Grantland Rice Bowl vs. Tennessee State 25–26 | |
| 1969 | Gulf States | 5 | 5 | | | |
| 1968 | Gulf States | 8 | 2 | | | |
| 1967 | Gulf States | 6 | 4 | | | |
| 1966 | Gulf States | 6 | 4 | | | |
| 1965 | Gulf States | 7 | 3 | | | |
| 1964 | Gulf States | 5 | 4 | | | |
| 1963 | Gulf States | 4 | 5 | | | |
| 1962 | Gulf States | 4 | 5 | 1 | | |
| 1961 | Gulf States | 2 | 8 | | | |
| 1960 | Gulf States | 6 | 4 | | | |
| 1959 | Gulf States | 4 | 5 | | | |
| 1958 | Gulf States | 1 | 8 | | | |
| 1957 | Gulf States | 4 | 5 | 1 | | |
| 1956 | Gulf States | 4 | 6 | | | |
| 1955 | Gulf States | 5 | 4 | | | |
| 1954 | Gulf States | 5 | 4 | | | |
| 1953 | Gulf States | 4 | 7 | | | |
| 1952 | Gulf States | 5 | 2 | 2 | | |
| 1951 | Gulf States | 6 | 4 | | | |
| 1950 | Gulf States | 5 | 4 | | | |
| 1949 | Gulf States | 6 | 3 | | | |
| 1948 | Gulf States | 6 | 3 | 1 | | |
| 1947 | Independent | 6 | 2 | | | |
| 1946 | Independent | 6 | 4 | | | |
| 1945 | Independent | 1 | 6 | 1 | | |
| 1944 | Independent | 5 | 4 | | | |
| 1943 | Independent | 5 | 0 | 1 | | |
| 1942 | Independent | 3 | 4 | | | |
| 1941 | Independent | 6 | 2 | 1 | | |
| 1940 | Independent | 6 | 3 | 1 | | |
| 1939 | Independent | 3 | 5 | 1 | | |
| 1938 | Independent | 8 | 2 | 1 | | |
| 1937 | Independent | 4 | 3 | 1 | | |
| 1936 | Independent | 2 | 7 | 1 | | |
| 1935 | Independent | 2 | 8 | | | |
| 1934 | Independent | 5 | 4 | | | |
| 1933 | Independent | 6 | 3 | | | |
| 1932 | Independent | 3 | 4 | | | |
| 1931 | Independent | 1 | 6 | 1 | | |
| 1930 | Independent | 2 | 8 | | | |
| 1929 | Independent | 2 | 7 | | | |
| 1928 | Independent | 4 | 5 | | | |
| 1927 | Independent | 2 | 7 | 1 | | |
| 1926 | Independent | 6 | 3 | 1 | | |
| 1925 | Independent | 7 | 2 | | | |
| 1924 | Independent | 6 | 2 | 1 | | |
| 1923 | Independent | 7 | 3 | | | |
| 1922 | Independent | 3 | 4 | 2 | | |
| 1921 | Independent | 9 | 2 | | | |
| 1920 | Independent | 2 | 8 | | | |
| 1919 | Independent | 2 | 4 | 2 | | |
| 1918 | Independent | 4 | 1 | | | |
| 1917 | Independent | 8 | 2 | | | |
| 1916 | Independent | 7 | 1 | | | |
| 1915 | Independent | 5 | 2 | 1 | | |
| 1914 | Independent | 5 | 3 | | | |
| 1913 | Independent | 4 | 4 | | | |
| 1912 | Independent | 3 | 4 | | | |
| 1911 | Independent | 1 | 4 | 1 | | |
| 1910 | Independent | 6 | 2 | 1 | | |
| 1909 | Independent | 5 | 2 | 2 | | |
| 1908 | Independent | 6 | 0 | | | |
| 1907 | Independent | 1 | 0 | | | |
| 1906 | Independent | 1 | 0 | 1 | | |
| 1905 | Independent | | | | | Season canceled by a yellow fever outbreak. |
| 1904 | Independent | 2 | 0 | 1 | | |
| 1903 | Independent | 1 | 1 | | | |
| 1902 | Independent | 1 | 2 | | | |
| 1901 | Independent | 2 | 0 | | | |
| | Totals | 588 | 575 | 34 | (1901–2025) | |
