= 1928 The Citadel Bulldogs football team =

American college football season

1928 The Citadel Bulldogs football
- Conference: Southern Intercollegiate Athletic Association
- Record: 6–3–1 (4–3 SIAA)
- Head coach: Carl Prause (7th season)
- Home stadium: Johnson Hagood Stadium

1928 Southern Intercollegiate Athletic Association football standings
| | Conf. | | | | | Overall |
| Team | W | | L | | T | W | | L | | T |
|---|---|---|---|---|---|---|---|---|---|---|
| Chattanooga $ | 8 | – | 1 | – | 0 | 8 | – | 2 | – | 0 |
| Mississippi College | 6 | – | 1 | – | 2 | 7 | – | 1 | – | 2 |
| Western Kentucky State Normal | 5 | – | 1 | – | 0 | 8 | – | 1 | – | 0 |
| Southern College | 4 | – | 1 | – | 0 | 5 | – | 2 | – | 1 |
| Transylvania | 4 | – | 1 | – | 0 | 8 | – | 3 | – | 0 |
| Wofford | 5 | – | 2 | – | 0 | 7 | – | 2 | – | 1 |
| Furman | 3 | – | 1 | – | 0 | 5 | – | 4 | – | 0 |
| Millsaps | 4 | – | 2 | – | 1 | 5 | – | 3 | – | 1 |
| Howard (AL) | 4 | – | 2 | – | 1 | 6 | – | 4 | – | 1 |
| Centenary | 2 | – | 1 | – | 1 | 6 | – | 3 | – | 2 |
| Louisiana College | 2 | – | 1 | – | 0 | 3 | – | 5 | – | 0 |
| The Citadel | 4 | – | 3 | – | 0 | 6 | – | 3 | – | 1 |
| Southwestern (TN) | 2 | – | 2 | – | 0 | 6 | – | 4 | – | 0 |
| Birmingham–Southern | 2 | – | 2 | – | 3 | 3 | – | 2 | – | 4 |
| Mercer | 2 | – | 2 | – | 1 | 3 | – | 5 | – | 1 |
| Georgetown (KY) | 3 | – | 3 | – | 0 | 3 | – | 6 | – | 0 |
| SW Louisiana | 3 | – | 4 | – | 0 | 4 | – | 5 | – | 0 |
| Kentucky Wesleyan | 2 | – | 3 | – | 0 | 6 | – | 3 | – | 0 |
| Stetson | 2 | – | 3 | – | 0 | 4 | – | 3 | – | 0 |
| Newberry | 2 | – | 3 | – | 0 | 3 | – | 5 | – | 0 |
| Spring Hill | 2 | – | 3 | – | 1 | 2 | – | 5 | – | 1 |
| Oglethorpe | 1 | – | 2 | – | 0 | 3 | – | 5 | – | 1 |
| Presbyterian | 2 | – | 5 | – | 0 | 4 | – | 6 | – | 0 |
| Louisiana Normal | 1 | – | 3 | – | 0 | 5 | – | 4 | – | 0 |
| Union (TN) | 2 | – | 6 | – | 0 | 3 | – | 7 | – | 0 |
| Centre | 1 | – | 3 | – | 0 | 2 | – | 8 | – | 0 |
| Louisiana Tech | 1 | – | 6 | – | 0 | 2 | – | 7 | – | 0 |
| Rollins | 0 | – | 3 | – | 0 | 0 | – | 4 | – | 0 |
| Louisville | 0 | – | 4 | – | 0 | 1 | – | 7 | – | 0 |
| Erskine | 0 | – | 5 | – | 0 | 2 | – | 7 | – | 0 |
$ – Conference champion

The 1928 The Citadel Bulldogs football team represented The Citadel, The Military College of South Carolina as member of the Southern Intercollegiate Athletic Association (SIAA) in the 1928 college football season. Carl Prause served as head coach for the first season overall. The Bulldogs played home games at Johnson Hagood Stadium.

== Schedule ==
| Date | Opponent | Site | Result | Source |
|---|---|---|---|---|
| October 6 | Stetson | Johnson Hagood Stadium; Charleston, SC | W 39–0 | |
| October 13 | Newberry | Johnson Hagood Stadium; Charleston, SC | W 32–6 | |
| October 20 | Davidson | Johnson Hagood Stadium; Charleston, SC | W 26–12 | |
| October 27 | Erskine | Johnson Hagood Stadium; Charleston, SC | W 14–0 | |
| November 1 | vs. South Carolina* | County Fairgrounds; Orangeburg, SC | T 0–0 | |
| November 10 | at Furman | Manly Field; Greenville, SC (rivalry) | L 0–13 | |
| November 17 | vs. Mercer | Municipal Stadium; Savannah, GA | L 0–7 | |
| November 24 | at Wofford | Snyder Field; Spartanburg, SC (rivalry) | L 7–9 | |
| December 1 | Presbyterian | Johnson Hagood Stadium; Charleston, SC | W 25–0 | |
| December 8 | Clemson* | Johnson Hagood Stadium; Charleston, SC | W 12–7 | |
*Non-conference game
