= 1928 Wofford Terriers football team =

American college football season

1928 Wofford Terriers football
- Conference: Southern Intercollegiate Athletic Association
- Record: 7–2–1 (5–2 SIAA)
- Head coach: Tommy Scaffe (2nd season)
- Home stadium: Snyder Field

1928 Southern Intercollegiate Athletic Association football standings
	Conf.					Overall
Team	W		L		T	W		L		T
Chattanooga $	8	–	1	–	0	8	–	2	–	0
Mississippi College	6	–	1	–	2	7	–	1	–	2
Western Kentucky State Normal	5	–	1	–	0	8	–	1	–	0
Southern College	4	–	1	–	0	5	–	2	–	1
Transylvania	4	–	1	–	0	8	–	3	–	0
Wofford	5	–	2	–	0	7	–	2	–	1
Furman	3	–	1	–	0	5	–	4	–	0
Millsaps	4	–	2	–	1	5	–	3	–	1
Howard (AL)	4	–	2	–	1	6	–	4	–	1
Centenary	2	–	1	–	1	6	–	3	–	2
Louisiana College	2	–	1	–	0	3	–	5	–	0
The Citadel	4	–	3	–	0	6	–	3	–	1
Southwestern (TN)	2	–	2	–	0	6	–	4	–	0
Birmingham–Southern	2	–	2	–	3	3	–	2	–	4
Mercer	2	–	2	–	1	3	–	5	–	1
Georgetown (KY)	3	–	3	–	0	3	–	6	–	0
SW Louisiana	3	–	4	–	0	4	–	5	–	0
Kentucky Wesleyan	2	–	3	–	0	6	–	3	–	0
Stetson	2	–	3	–	0	4	–	3	–	0
Newberry	2	–	3	–	0	3	–	5	–	0
Spring Hill	2	–	3	–	1	2	–	5	–	1
Oglethorpe	1	–	2	–	0	3	–	5	–	1
Presbyterian	2	–	5	–	0	4	–	6	–	0
Louisiana Normal	1	–	3	–	0	5	–	4	–	0
Union (TN)	2	–	6	–	0	3	–	7	–	0
Centre	1	–	3	–	0	2	–	8	–	0
Louisiana Tech	1	–	6	–	0	2	–	7	–	0
Rollins	0	–	3	–	0	0	–	4	–	0
Louisville	0	–	4	–	0	1	–	7	–	0
Erskine	0	–	5	–	0	2	–	7	–	0
$ – Conference champion

The 1928 Wofford Terriers football team was an American football team that represented Wofford College as a member of the Southern Intercollegiate Athletic Association (SIAA) during the 1928 college football season. In their second year under head coach Tommy Scaffe, the team compiled a 7–1–2 record.

== Schedule ==
Date	Opponent	Site	Result	Source
September 29	High Point*	Snyder Field; Spartanburg, SC	W 7–0	
October 6	Erskine	Snyder Field; Spartanburg, SC	W 25–12	
October 13	at Davidson*	Richardson Field; Davidson, NC	W 7–0	
October 20	vs. Newberry	Sumter County Fairgrounds; Sumter, SC	W 14–13	
October 27	at Furman	Manly Field; Greenville, SC (rivalry)	L 0–26	
November 1	Presbyterian	Snyder Field; Spartanburg, SC	W 25–0	
November 9	Georgetown (KY)	Snyder Field; Spartanburg, SC	W 7–0	
November 16	at Wake Forest*	Gore Field; Wake Forest, NC	T 7–7	
November 24	The Citadel	Snyder Field; Spartanburg, SC (rivalry)	W 9–7	
November 29	at Florida Southern	College Field; Lakeland, FL	L 7–13	
*Non-conference game
