= 1928 Oglethorpe Stormy Petrels football team =

American college football season

1928 Oglethorpe Stormy Petrels football
- Conference: Southern Intercollegiate Athletic Association
- Record: 3–5–1 (1–2 SIAA)
- Head coach: Harry J. Robertson (5th season)
- Captains: Jake Malsey; James Sims

1928 Southern Intercollegiate Athletic Association football standings
	Conf.					Overall
Team	W		L		T	W		L		T
Chattanooga $	8	–	1	–	0	8	–	2	–	0
Mississippi College	6	–	1	–	2	7	–	1	–	2
Western Kentucky State Normal	5	–	1	–	0	8	–	1	–	0
Southern College	4	–	1	–	0	5	–	2	–	1
Transylvania	4	–	1	–	0	8	–	3	–	0
Wofford	5	–	2	–	0	7	–	2	–	1
Furman	3	–	1	–	0	5	–	4	–	0
Millsaps	4	–	2	–	1	5	–	3	–	1
Howard (AL)	4	–	2	–	1	6	–	4	–	1
Centenary	2	–	1	–	1	6	–	3	–	2
Louisiana College	2	–	1	–	0	3	–	5	–	0
The Citadel	4	–	3	–	0	6	–	3	–	1
Southwestern (TN)	2	–	2	–	0	6	–	4	–	0
Birmingham–Southern	2	–	2	–	3	3	–	2	–	4
Mercer	2	–	2	–	1	3	–	5	–	1
Georgetown (KY)	3	–	3	–	0	3	–	6	–	0
SW Louisiana	3	–	4	–	0	4	–	5	–	0
Kentucky Wesleyan	2	–	3	–	0	6	–	3	–	0
Stetson	2	–	3	–	0	4	–	3	–	0
Newberry	2	–	3	–	0	3	–	5	–	0
Spring Hill	2	–	3	–	1	2	–	5	–	1
Oglethorpe	1	–	2	–	0	3	–	5	–	1
Presbyterian	2	–	5	–	0	4	–	6	–	0
Louisiana Normal	1	–	3	–	0	5	–	4	–	0
Union (TN)	2	–	6	–	0	3	–	7	–	0
Centre	1	–	3	–	0	2	–	8	–	0
Louisiana Tech	1	–	6	–	0	2	–	7	–	0
Rollins	0	–	3	–	0	0	–	4	–	0
Louisville	0	–	4	–	0	1	–	7	–	0
Erskine	0	–	5	–	0	2	–	7	–	0
$ – Conference champion

The 1928 Oglethorpe Stormy Petrels football team represented Oglethorpe University in the sport of American football as member of the Southern Intercollegiate Athletic Association (SIAA) during the 1928 college football season. The 1928 season was highly anticipated. The Petrels were expected to do very well. However, the only game that was considered a true success was Oglethorpe's victory of her rival, Mercer.

== Schedule ==
Date	Opponent	Site	Result	Attendance	Source
September 28	North Georgia*	Hermance Field; North Atlanta, GA	W 70–0		
October 6	vs. High Point*	Memorial Stadium; Asheville, NC	W 33–0	1,000	
October 13	Loyola (LA)*	Hermance Field; North Atlanta, GA	L 6–33		
October 20	at St. Xavier*	Corcoran Field; Cincinnati, OH	L 6–9		
October 27	Maryville (TN)*	Hermance Field; North Atlanta, GA	T 6–6		
November 3	at Georgia Tech*	Grant Field; Atlanta, GA	L 7–32	8,000	
November 12	at Mercer	Centennial Stadium; Macon, GA	W 15–0		
November 16	at Presbyterian	Johnson Field; Clinton, SC	L 6–7		
November 29	at Chattanooga	Chamberlain Field; Chattanooga, TN	L 19–33		
*Non-conference game
