= 1928 Transylvania Pioneers football team =

American college football season

1928 Transylvania Pioneers football
- Conference: Southern Intercollegiate Athletic Association
- Record: 8–3 (4–1 SIAA)
- Head coach: James Elam (2nd season)
- Home stadium: Thomas Field

1928 Southern Intercollegiate Athletic Association football standings
	Conf.					Overall
Team	W		L		T	W		L		T
Chattanooga $	8	–	1	–	0	8	–	2	–	0
Mississippi College	6	–	1	–	2	7	–	1	–	2
Western Kentucky State Normal	5	–	1	–	0	8	–	1	–	0
Southern College	4	–	1	–	0	5	–	2	–	1
Transylvania	4	–	1	–	0	8	–	3	–	0
Wofford	5	–	2	–	0	7	–	2	–	1
Furman	3	–	1	–	0	5	–	4	–	0
Millsaps	4	–	2	–	1	5	–	3	–	1
Howard (AL)	4	–	2	–	1	6	–	4	–	1
Centenary	2	–	1	–	1	6	–	3	–	2
Louisiana College	2	–	1	–	0	3	–	5	–	0
The Citadel	4	–	3	–	0	6	–	3	–	1
Southwestern (TN)	2	–	2	–	0	6	–	4	–	0
Birmingham–Southern	2	–	2	–	3	3	–	2	–	4
Mercer	2	–	2	–	1	3	–	5	–	1
Georgetown (KY)	3	–	3	–	0	3	–	6	–	0
SW Louisiana	3	–	4	–	0	4	–	5	–	0
Kentucky Wesleyan	2	–	3	–	0	6	–	3	–	0
Stetson	2	–	3	–	0	4	–	3	–	0
Newberry	2	–	3	–	0	3	–	5	–	0
Spring Hill	2	–	3	–	1	2	–	5	–	1
Oglethorpe	1	–	2	–	0	3	–	5	–	1
Presbyterian	2	–	5	–	0	4	–	6	–	0
Louisiana Normal	1	–	3	–	0	5	–	4	–	0
Union (TN)	2	–	6	–	0	3	–	7	–	0
Centre	1	–	3	–	0	2	–	8	–	0
Louisiana Tech	1	–	6	–	0	2	–	7	–	0
Rollins	0	–	3	–	0	0	–	4	–	0
Louisville	0	–	4	–	0	1	–	7	–	0
Erskine	0	–	5	–	0	2	–	7	–	0
$ – Conference champion

The 1928 Transylvania Pioneers football team represented Transylvania University as a member the Southern Intercollegiate Athletic Association (SIAA) during the 1928 college football season.

== Schedule ==
Date	Time	Opponent	Site	Result	Attendance	Source
September 15		Morris Harvey*	Thomas Field; Lexington, KY	W 42–14		
September 22	2:30 p.m.	at Centre	Cheek Field; Danville, KY	W 6–0	4,000	
September 29		at St. Xavier*	Corcoran Field; Cincinnati, OH	L 2–19		
October 6		at Miami (OH)*	Miami Field; Oxford, OH	L 0–8		
October 13		at Sewanee*	Hardee Field; Sewanee, TN	W 14–13		
October 20		Union (KY)*	Thomas Field; Lexington, KY	W 36–6		
October 27		at Louisville	Parkway Field; Louisville, KY	W 18–0		
November 3		at Cincinnati*	Carson Field; Cincinnati, OH	W 25–6		
November 10		Eastern Kentucky	Thomas Field; Lexington, KY	W 64–0		
November 16		Georgetown (KY)	Thomas Field; Lexington, KY	L 6–7		
November 29		Kentucky Wesleyan	Thomas Field; Lexington, KY	W 20–7		
*Non-conference game; All times are in Central time
