= 1928 Mercer Bears football team =

American college football season

1928 Mercer Bears football
- Conference: Southern Intercollegiate Athletic Association
- Record: 3–5–1 (2–2–1 SIAA)
- Head coach: Bernie Moore (3rd season)
- Home stadium: Centennial Stadium

1928 Southern Intercollegiate Athletic Association football standings
| | Conf. | | | | | Overall |
| Team | W | | L | | T | W | | L | | T |
|---|---|---|---|---|---|---|---|---|---|---|
| Chattanooga $ | 8 | – | 1 | – | 0 | 8 | – | 2 | – | 0 |
| Mississippi College | 6 | – | 1 | – | 2 | 7 | – | 1 | – | 2 |
| Western Kentucky State Normal | 5 | – | 1 | – | 0 | 8 | – | 1 | – | 0 |
| Southern College | 4 | – | 1 | – | 0 | 5 | – | 2 | – | 1 |
| Transylvania | 4 | – | 1 | – | 0 | 8 | – | 3 | – | 0 |
| Wofford | 5 | – | 2 | – | 0 | 7 | – | 2 | – | 1 |
| Furman | 3 | – | 1 | – | 0 | 5 | – | 4 | – | 0 |
| Millsaps | 4 | – | 2 | – | 1 | 5 | – | 3 | – | 1 |
| Howard (AL) | 4 | – | 2 | – | 1 | 6 | – | 4 | – | 1 |
| Centenary | 2 | – | 1 | – | 1 | 6 | – | 3 | – | 2 |
| Louisiana College | 2 | – | 1 | – | 0 | 3 | – | 5 | – | 0 |
| The Citadel | 4 | – | 3 | – | 0 | 6 | – | 3 | – | 1 |
| Southwestern (TN) | 2 | – | 2 | – | 0 | 6 | – | 4 | – | 0 |
| Birmingham–Southern | 2 | – | 2 | – | 3 | 3 | – | 2 | – | 4 |
| Mercer | 2 | – | 2 | – | 1 | 3 | – | 5 | – | 1 |
| Georgetown (KY) | 3 | – | 3 | – | 0 | 3 | – | 6 | – | 0 |
| SW Louisiana | 3 | – | 4 | – | 0 | 4 | – | 5 | – | 0 |
| Kentucky Wesleyan | 2 | – | 3 | – | 0 | 6 | – | 3 | – | 0 |
| Stetson | 2 | – | 3 | – | 0 | 4 | – | 3 | – | 0 |
| Newberry | 2 | – | 3 | – | 0 | 3 | – | 5 | – | 0 |
| Spring Hill | 2 | – | 3 | – | 1 | 2 | – | 5 | – | 1 |
| Oglethorpe | 1 | – | 2 | – | 0 | 3 | – | 5 | – | 1 |
| Presbyterian | 2 | – | 5 | – | 0 | 4 | – | 6 | – | 0 |
| Louisiana Normal | 1 | – | 3 | – | 0 | 5 | – | 4 | – | 0 |
| Union (TN) | 2 | – | 6 | – | 0 | 3 | – | 7 | – | 0 |
| Centre | 1 | – | 3 | – | 0 | 2 | – | 8 | – | 0 |
| Louisiana Tech | 1 | – | 6 | – | 0 | 2 | – | 7 | – | 0 |
| Rollins | 0 | – | 3 | – | 0 | 0 | – | 4 | – | 0 |
| Louisville | 0 | – | 4 | – | 0 | 1 | – | 7 | – | 0 |
| Erskine | 0 | – | 5 | – | 0 | 2 | – | 7 | – | 0 |
$ – Conference champion

The 1928 Mercer Bears football team was an American football team that represented Mercer University as a member of the Southern Intercollegiate Athletic Association (SIAA) during the 1928 college football season. In their third year under head coach Bernie Moore, the team compiled a 3–5–1 record.

== Schedule ==
| Date | Opponent | Site | Result | Attendance | Source |
|---|---|---|---|---|---|
| September 28 | at Presbyterian | Bailey Stadium; Clinton, SC | W 7–6 | 3,000 | |
| October 6 | at Georgia* | Sanford Field; Athens, GA | L 0–52 | | |
| October 13 | Howard (AL) | Centennial Stadium; Macon, GA | L 7–15 | 6,000 | |
| October 20 | at Florida* | Fleming Field; Gainesville, FL | L 0–73 | 8,000 | |
| October 26 | Birmingham–Southern | Centennial Stadium; Macon, GA | T 20–20 | | |
| November 3 | at Duke* | Hanes Field; Durham, NC | L 18–38 | | |
| November 12 | Oglethorpe | Centennial Stadium; Macon, GA | L 0–15 | 7,500 | |
| November 17 | vs. The Citadel | Municipal Stadium; Savannah, GA | W 7–0 | 5,000 | |
| November 29 | vs. Wake Forest* | Memorial Stadium; Asheville, NC | W 14–12 | 4,000 | |
*Non-conference game
