= Louisiana Normal Demons football, 1920–1929 =

American college football seasons

The Louisiana Normal Demons football program, 1920–1929 represented Louisiana State Normal School (now known as Northwestern State University) as a member of the Louisiana Intercollegiate Athletic Association (LIAA), as an independent, and as a member of the Southern Intercollegiate Athletic Association (SIAA) during the decade of the 1920s. During this period, Louisiana Normal played their home games on campus at Normal Athletic Park in Natchitoches, Louisiana.

During this time the Demons were led by head coach H. Lee Prather and he had an overall record for the decade of 38–32–10. Their most notable season during the decade was in 1920 when they captured the LIAA championship.

== 1920 ==
1920 Louisiana Normal football

LIAA champion
- Conference: Louisiana Intercollegiate Athletic Association
- Record: 5–1–1 (4–0–1 LIAA)
- Head coach: H. Lee Prather (7th season)
- Home stadium: Normal Athletic Park

The 1920 Louisiana Normal football team was an American football team that represented the Louisiana State Normal School (now known as Northwestern State University) that competed as a member of the Louisiana Intercollegiate Athletic Association (LIAA) during the 1920 college football season. Led by seventh-year head coach H. Lee Prather, Louisiana Normal compiled an overall record of 5–1–1 and finished as LIAA champion.

Schedule

| Date | Opponent | Site | Result | Source |
|---|---|---|---|---|
| September 24 | Winnfield High School* | Normal Athletic Park; Natchitoches, LA | W 12–6 | |
| October 2 | at LSU* | State Field; Baton Rouge, LA | L 0–34 | |
| October 16 | at Louisiana College | Pineville, LA | T 13–13 | |
| October 30 | at St. Charles College (LA) | Grand Coteau, LA | W 6–0 | |
| November 5 | at Louisiana Industrial | Ruston, LA (rivalry) | W 12–0 | |
| November 19 | Louisiana College | Normal Athletic Park; Natchitoches, LA | W 6–0 | |
| November 25 | Southwestern Louisiana Industrial | Normal Athletic Park; Natchitoches, LA | W 20–0 | |
*Non-conference game

== 1921 ==
1921 Louisiana Normal football
- Conference: Louisiana Intercollegiate Athletic Association
- Record: 3–3–1 (2–2–1 LIAA)
- Head coach: H. Lee Prather (8th season)
- Home stadium: Normal Athletic Park

The 1921 Louisiana Normal football team was an American football team that represented the Louisiana State Normal School (now known as Northwestern State University) that competed as a member of the Louisiana Intercollegiate Athletic Association (LIAA) during the 1921 college football season. Led by eighth-year head coach H. Lee Prather, Louisiana Normal compiled an overall record of 3–3–1.

Schedule

| Date | Opponent | Site | Result | Source |
|---|---|---|---|---|
| September 30 | Natchitoches High School* | Normal Athletic Park; Natchitoches, LA | W 13–0 | |
| October 8 | at LSU* | State Field; Baton Rouge, LA | L 0–78 | |
| October 29 | at Centenary | Louisiana State Fairgrounds; Shreveport, LA | W 7–0 | |
| November 11 | St. Charles College (LA) | Normal Athletic Park; Natchitoches, LA | T 0–0 | |
| November 19 | at Louisiana Tech | Ruston, LA (rivalry) | L 0–15 | |
| November 24 | at Southwestern Louisiana | Girard Field; Lafayette, LA | L 0–33 | |
| December 5 | Louisiana College | Normal Athletic Park; Natchitoches, LA | W 14–6 | |
*Non-conference game

== 1922 ==
1922 Louisiana Normal football
- Conference: Louisiana Intercollegiate Athletic Association
- Record: 4–2–1 (2–1–1 LIAA)
- Head coach: H. Lee Prather (9th season)
- Home stadium: Normal Athletic Park

The 1922 Louisiana Normal football team was an American football team that represented the Louisiana State Normal School (now known as Northwestern State University) that competed as a member of the Louisiana Intercollegiate Athletic Association (LIAA) during the 1922 college football season. Led by ninth-year head coach H. Lee Prather, Louisiana Normal compiled an overall record of 4–2–1.

Schedule

| Date | Opponent | Site | Result | Attendance | Source |
|---|---|---|---|---|---|
| September 30 | at LSU* | State Field; Baton Rouge, LA | L 0–13 | 3,000 | |
| October 14 | vs. Louisiana College | Central Louisiana Fairgrounds; Alexandria, LA | W 20–0 | | |
| October 20 | Louisiana Tech | Normal Athletic Park; Natchitoches, LA (rivalry) | T 0–0 | | |
| October 25 | at Centenary | Louisiana State Fairgrounds; Shreveport, LA | L 7–28 | | |
| November 3 | Magnolia A&M* | Normal Athletic Park; Natchitoches, LA | W 25–0 | | |
| November 11 | at Tulane freshmen* | Tulane Stadium; New Orleans, LA | W 7–0 | | |
| November 30 | Southwestern Louisiana | Normal Athletic Park; Natchitoches, LA | W 13–6 | | |
*Non-conference game

== 1923 ==
1923 Louisiana Normal football
- Conference: Louisiana Intercollegiate Athletic Association
- Record: 3–6 (0–4 LIAA)
- Head coach: H. Lee Prather (10th season)
- Home stadium: Normal Athletic Park

The 1923 Louisiana Normal football team was an American football team that represented the Louisiana State Normal School (now known as Northwestern State University) that competed as a member of the Louisiana Intercollegiate Athletic Association (LIAA) during the 1923 college football season. Led by 10th-year head coach H. Lee Prather, Louisiana Normal compiled an overall record of 3–6.

Schedule

| Date | Opponent | Site | Result | Source |
|---|---|---|---|---|
| September 29 | at LSU* | State Field; Baton Rouge, LA | L 0–40 | |
| October 5 | Rusk College* | Normal Athletic Park; Natchitoches, LA | W 25–6 | |
| October 13 | at Loyola (LA)* | Loyola Stadium; New Orleans, LA | L 0–36 | |
| October 20 | at Centenary | Louisiana State Fairgrounds; Shreveport, LA | L 0–46 | |
| October 26 | Tulane freshmen* | Normal Athletic Park; Natchitoches, LA | W 21–0 | |
| November 3 | at Magnolia A&M* | Magnolia, AR | W 6–0 | |
| November 10 | at Louisiana Tech | L. P. I. Field; Ruston, LA (rivalry) | L 7–66 | |
| November 19 | Louisiana College | Normal Athletic Park; Natchitoches, LA | L 6–20 | |
| November 29 | at Southwestern Louisiana | Girard Field; Lafayette, LA | L 12–14 | |
*Non-conference game

== 1924 ==
1924 Louisiana Normal Demons football
- Conference: Louisiana Intercollegiate Athletic Association
- Record: 4–2–1 (0–1–1 LIAA)
- Head coach: H. Lee Prather (11th season)
- Home stadium: Normal Athletic Park

The 1924 Louisiana Normal Demons football team was an American football team that represented the Louisiana State Normal School (now known as Northwestern State University) that competed as a member of the Louisiana Intercollegiate Athletic Association (LIAA) during the 1924 college football season. Led by 11th-year head coach H. Lee Prather, Louisiana Normal compiled an overall record of 4–2–1.

Schedule

| Date | Opponent | Site | Result | Source |
|---|---|---|---|---|
| October 3 | LSU freshmen* | Normal Athletic Park; Natchitoches, LA | W 13–0 | |
| October 10 | Rusk College* | Normal Athletic Park; Natchitoches, LA | W 26–0 | |
| October 18 | at Louisiana College | College Field; Pineville, LA | T 0–0 | |
| October 31 | Magnolia A&M* | Normal Athletic Park; Natchitoches, LA | W 45–0 | |
| November 7 | at Stephen F. Austin* | Birdwell Field; Nacogdoches, TX (rivalry) | W 7–3 | |
| November 15 | at LSU* | State Field; Baton Rouge, LA | L 0–40 | |
| November 27 | Southwestern Louisiana | Normal Athletic Park; Natchitoches, LA | L 0–20 | |
*Non-conference game

== 1925 ==
1925 Louisiana Normal Demons football
- Conference: Louisiana Intercollegiate Athletic Association
- Record: 5–3–1 ( LIAA)
- Head coach: H. Lee Prather (12th season)
- Home stadium: Normal Athletic Park

The 1925 Louisiana Normal Demons football team was an American football team that represented the Louisiana State Normal School (now known as Northwestern State University) that competed as a member of the Louisiana Intercollegiate Athletic Association (LIAA) during the 1925 college football season. Led by 12th-year head coach H. Lee Prather, Louisiana Normal compiled an overall record of 5–3–1.

Schedule

| Date | Opponent | Site | Result | Source |
|---|---|---|---|---|
| September 26 | at LSU* | Tiger Stadium; Baton Rouge, LA | L 0–27 | |
| October 2 | Lon Morris* | Normal Athletic Park; Natchitoches, LA | W 20–0 | |
| October 9 | Rusk College* | Normal Athletic Park; Natchitoches, LA | W 6–0 | |
| October 16 | Louisiana College | Normal Athletic Park; Natchitoches, LA | W 39–12 | |
| October 23 | South Park Junior College* | Normal Athletic Park; Natchitoches, LA | W 14–0 | |
| October 30 | Jefferson College (LA)* | Normal Athletic Park; Natchitoches, LA | W 12–0 | |
| November 6 | Stephen F. Austin* | Normal Athletic Park; Natchitoches, LA (rivalry) | L 6–7 | |
| November 11 | at Magnolia A&M* | Magnolia, AR | T 0–0 | |
| November 26 | at Southwestern Louisiana | Girard Field; Lafayette, LA | L 7–24 | |
*Non-conference game

== 1926 ==
1926 Louisiana Normal Demons football
- Conference: Independent
- Record: 3–5–1
- Head coach: H. Lee Prather (13th season)
- Home stadium: Normal Athletic Park

1926 Southern college football independents records
| | Conf. | | | Overall |
| Team | W | L | T | W | | L | | T |
|---|---|---|---|---|---|---|---|---|
| Loyola (LA) | | – | | 10 | – | 0 | – | 0 |
| Miami (FL) | | – | | 8 | – | 0 | – | 0 |
| Howard | | – | | 7 | – | 0 | – | 0 |
| Delaware State | | – | | 1 | – | 0 | – | 0 |
| No. 2 Navy | | – | | 9 | – | 0 | – | 1 |
| Wesley | | – | | 6 | – | 1 | – | 0 |
| Texas Tech | | – | | 6 | – | 1 | – | 3 |
| Davidson | | – | | 7 | – | 2 | – | 1 |
| Georgetown | | – | | 7 | – | 2 | – | 1 |
| William & Mary | | – | | 7 | – | 3 | – | 0 |
| Georgia Normal | | – | | 5 | – | 3 | – | 1 |
| Hampden–Sydney | | – | | 5 | – | 2 | – | 3 |
| George Washington | | – | | 5 | – | 4 | – | 0 |
| Middle Tennessee State Teachers | | – | | 4 | – | 2 | – | 1 |
| Spring Hill | | – | | 3 | – | 2 | – | 1 |
| Texas A&I | | – | | 4 | – | 3 | – | 0 |
| Wake Forest | | – | | 5 | – | 4 | – | 1 |
| Texas Mines | | – | | 3 | – | 4 | – | 0 |
| Mississippi State Teachers | | – | | 3 | – | 4 | – | 1 |
| Tennessee Docs | | – | | 3 | – | 5 | – | 1 |
| Catholic University | | – | | 3 | – | 5 | – | 0 |
| Delaware | | – | | 3 | – | 5 | – | 0 |
| East Tennessee State Teachers | | – | | 2 | – | 4 | – | 1 |
| Duke | | – | | 3 | – | 6 | – | 0 |
| Richmond | | – | | 2 | – | 7 | – | 0 |
| Harding | | – | | 1 | – | 5 | – | 0 |
| West Tennessee State Teachers | | – | | 1 | – | 8 | – | 0 |
Rankings from Dickinson System

The 1926 Louisiana Normal Demons football team was an American football team that represented the Louisiana State Normal School (now known as Northwestern State University) that competed as an independent during the 1926 college football season. Led by 13th-year head coach H. Lee Prather, Louisiana Normal compiled an overall record of 3–5–1.

Schedule

| Date | Opponent | Site | Result | Source |
|---|---|---|---|---|
| September 25 | at LSU | Tiger Stadium; Baton Rouge, LA | L 0–47 | |
| October 2 | at Louisiana Tech | Louisiana Tech Field; Ruston, LA (rivalry) | L 0–28 | |
| October 9 | Rusk College | Normal Athletic Park; Natchitoches, LA | L 6–10 | |
| October 25 | at Louisiana College | College Field; Pineville, LA | L 7–14 | |
| October 31 | Jefferson College (LA) | Normal Athletic Park; Natchitoches, LA | W 38–13 | |
| November 6 | vs. Stephen F. Austin | State Fair Stadium; Shreveport, LA (rivalry) | L 0–28 | |
| November 11 | Magnolia A&M | Normal Athletic Park; Natchitoches, LA | W 20–13 | |
| November 19 | vs. Southwestern Louisiana | City Park; Alexandria, LA | T 0–0 | |
| November 25 | East Texas State | Normal Athletic Park; Natchitoches, LA | W 17–7 | |

== 1927 ==
1927 Louisiana Normal Demons football
- Conference: Independent
- Record: 2–3–2
- Head coach: H. Lee Prather (14th season)
- Home stadium: Normal Athletic Park

1927 Southern college football independents records
| | Conf. | | | Overall |
| Team | W | L | T | W | | L | | T |
|---|---|---|---|---|---|---|---|---|
| Georgetown | | – | | 8 | – | 1 | – | 0 |
| Spring Hill | | – | | 6 | – | 1 | – | 0 |
| Wesley | | – | | 6 | – | 1 | – | 0 |
| Georgia Normal | | – | | 6 | – | 1 | – | 1 |
| George Washington | | – | | 7 | – | 2 | – | 0 |
| Texas A&I | | – | | 4 | – | 1 | – | 0 |
| Middle Tennessee State Teachers | | – | | 6 | – | 2 | – | 0 |
| Loyola (LA) | | – | | 6 | – | 2 | – | 2 |
| Navy | | – | | 6 | – | 3 | – | 0 |
| Catholic University | | – | | 5 | – | 3 | – | 0 |
| West Tennessee State Teachers | | – | | 5 | – | 3 | – | 1 |
| Texas Tech | | – | | 5 | – | 4 | – | 0 |
| Davidson | | – | | 4 | – | 4 | – | 1 |
| Delaware State | | – | | 1 | – | 1 | – | 0 |
| Howard | | – | | 3 | – | 3 | – | 2 |
| Southwestern (TN) | | – | | 5 | – | 5 | – | 1 |
| Texas Mines | | – | | 2 | – | 2 | – | 2 |
| Mississippi State Teachers | | – | | 3 | – | 4 | – | 1 |
| Duke | | – | | 4 | – | 5 | – | 0 |
| Miami (FL) | | – | | 3 | – | 6 | – | 1 |
| Delaware | | – | | 2 | – | 5 | – | 1 |
| East Tennessee State Teachers | | – | | 2 | – | 5 | – | 0 |
| Oglethorpe | | – | | 2 | – | 6 | – | 0 |
| Wake Forest | | – | | 2 | – | 6 | – | 2 |

The 1927 Louisiana Normal Demons football team was an American football team that represented the Louisiana State Normal School (now known as Northwestern State University) that competed as an independent during the 1927 college football season. Led by 13th-year head coach H. Lee Prather, Louisiana Normal compiled an overall record of 2–3–2.

Schedule

| Date | Opponent | Site | Result | Source |
|---|---|---|---|---|
| October 1 | at East Texas State | Commerce, TX | T 0–0 | |
| October 8 | Rusk College | Normal Athletic Park; Natchitoches, LA | W 19–7 | |
| October 15 | Louisiana Tech | Normal Athletic Park; Natchitoches, LA (rivalry) | L 0–33 | |
| October 22 | Louisiana College | Normal Athletic Park; Natchitoches, LA | L 12–13 | |
| November 4 | Stephen F. Austin | Normal Athletic Park; Natchitoches, LA (rivalry) | W 6–0 | |
| November 11 | at Magnolia A&M | Magnolia, AR | L 0–26 | |
| November 24 | Southwestern Louisiana | Normal Athletic Park; Natchitoches, LA | T 6–6 | |

== 1928 ==
1928 Louisiana Normal Demons football
- Conference: Southern Intercollegiate Athletic Association
- Record: 5–4 (1–3 SIAA)
- Head coach: H. Lee Prather (15th season)
- Home stadium: Normal Athletic Park; Natchitoches Fair Grounds

1928 Southern Intercollegiate Athletic Association football standings
| | Conf. | | | | | Overall |
| Team | W | | L | | T | W | | L | | T |
|---|---|---|---|---|---|---|---|---|---|---|
| Chattanooga $ | 8 | – | 1 | – | 0 | 8 | – | 2 | – | 0 |
| Mississippi College | 6 | – | 1 | – | 2 | 7 | – | 1 | – | 2 |
| Western Kentucky State Normal | 5 | – | 1 | – | 0 | 8 | – | 1 | – | 0 |
| Southern College | 4 | – | 1 | – | 0 | 5 | – | 2 | – | 1 |
| Transylvania | 4 | – | 1 | – | 0 | 8 | – | 3 | – | 0 |
| Wofford | 5 | – | 2 | – | 0 | 7 | – | 2 | – | 1 |
| Furman | 3 | – | 1 | – | 0 | 5 | – | 4 | – | 0 |
| Millsaps | 4 | – | 2 | – | 1 | 5 | – | 3 | – | 1 |
| Howard (AL) | 4 | – | 2 | – | 1 | 6 | – | 4 | – | 1 |
| Centenary | 2 | – | 1 | – | 1 | 6 | – | 3 | – | 2 |
| Louisiana College | 2 | – | 1 | – | 0 | 3 | – | 5 | – | 0 |
| The Citadel | 4 | – | 3 | – | 0 | 6 | – | 3 | – | 1 |
| Southwestern (TN) | 2 | – | 2 | – | 0 | 6 | – | 4 | – | 0 |
| Birmingham–Southern | 2 | – | 2 | – | 3 | 3 | – | 2 | – | 4 |
| Mercer | 2 | – | 2 | – | 1 | 3 | – | 5 | – | 1 |
| Georgetown (KY) | 3 | – | 3 | – | 0 | 3 | – | 6 | – | 0 |
| SW Louisiana | 3 | – | 4 | – | 0 | 4 | – | 5 | – | 0 |
| Kentucky Wesleyan | 2 | – | 3 | – | 0 | 6 | – | 3 | – | 0 |
| Stetson | 2 | – | 3 | – | 0 | 4 | – | 3 | – | 0 |
| Newberry | 2 | – | 3 | – | 0 | 3 | – | 5 | – | 0 |
| Spring Hill | 2 | – | 3 | – | 1 | 2 | – | 5 | – | 1 |
| Oglethorpe | 1 | – | 2 | – | 0 | 3 | – | 5 | – | 1 |
| Presbyterian | 2 | – | 5 | – | 0 | 4 | – | 6 | – | 0 |
| Louisiana Normal | 1 | – | 3 | – | 0 | 5 | – | 4 | – | 0 |
| Union (TN) | 2 | – | 6 | – | 0 | 3 | – | 7 | – | 0 |
| Centre | 1 | – | 3 | – | 0 | 2 | – | 8 | – | 0 |
| Louisiana Tech | 1 | – | 6 | – | 0 | 2 | – | 7 | – | 0 |
| Rollins | 0 | – | 3 | – | 0 | 0 | – | 4 | – | 0 |
| Louisville | 0 | – | 4 | – | 0 | 1 | – | 7 | – | 0 |
| Erskine | 0 | – | 5 | – | 0 | 2 | – | 7 | – | 0 |
$ – Conference champion

The 1928 Louisiana Normal Demons football team represented the Louisiana State Normal College (now known as Northwestern State University) as a member the Southern Intercollegiate Athletic Association (SIAA) during the 1928 college football season. Led by 15th-year head coach H. Lee Prather, the Demons compiled an overall record of 5–4 with a mark of 1–3 in conference play.

Schedule

| Date | Time | Opponent | Site | Result | Attendance | Source |
|---|---|---|---|---|---|---|
| September 29 | | at Tulane* | Tulane Stadium; New Orleans, LA | L 0–65 | | |
| October 6 | | Marshall (TX)* | Normal Athletic Park; Natchitoches, LA | W 27–0 | | |
| October 13 | | Louisiana Tech | Natchitoches Fair Grounds; Natchitoches, LA (rivalry) | W 6–0 | 3,000 | |
| October 20 | 3:00 p.m. | at Louisiana College | Louisiana College Stadium; Pineville, LA | L 6–18 | 2,500 | |
| October 27 | 2:30 p.m. | at Millsaps | Municipal Stadium; Jackson, MS | L 19–32 | | |
| November 2 | 2:30 p.m. | vs. Stephen F. Austin* | State Fair Stadium; Shreveport, LA (rivalry) | W 26–0 | 200 | |
| November 10 | | Magnolia A&M* | Normal Athletic Park; Natchitoches, LA | W 31–13 | | |
| November 17 | | Lon Morris* | Normal Athletic Park; Natchitoches, LA | W 33–7 | | |
| November 29 | 2:30 p.m. | at Southwestern Louisiana | Campus Athletic Field; Lafayette, LA | L 6–13 | 3,500 | |
*Non-conference game; All times are in Central time

== 1929 ==
1929 Louisiana Normal Demons football
- Conference: Southern Intercollegiate Athletic Association
- Record: 4–3–2 (1–0–2 SIAA)
- Head coach: H. Lee Prather (16th season)
- Home stadium: Normal Athletic Park; Natchitoches Fair Grounds

1929 Southern Intercollegiate Athletic Association football standings
| | Conf. | | | | | Overall |
| Team | W | | L | | T | W | | L | | T |
|---|---|---|---|---|---|---|---|---|---|---|
| Chattanooga $ | 7 | – | 0 | – | 0 | 8 | – | 2 | – | 0 |
| Spring Hill | 4 | – | 0 | – | 0 | 7 | – | 1 | – | 0 |
| Centre | 4 | – | 0 | – | 1 | 5 | – | 3 | – | 1 |
| The Citadel | 4 | – | 0 | – | 1 | 5 | – | 4 | – | 1 |
| Louisiana College | 3 | – | 0 | – | 1 | 6 | – | 2 | – | 1 |
| Centenary | 1 | – | 0 | – | 0 | 6 | – | 3 | – | 1 |
| Louisiana Normal | 1 | – | 0 | – | 2 | 4 | – | 3 | – | 2 |
| Furman | 4 | – | 1 | – | 1 | 5 | – | 4 | – | 1 |
| Stetson | 3 | – | 1 | – | 0 | 5 | – | 1 | – | 0 |
| Millsaps | 3 | – | 1 | – | 2 | 6 | – | 1 | – | 3 |
| Southwestern (TN) | 2 | – | 1 | – | 0 | 5 | – | 3 | – | 0 |
| Transylvania | 2 | – | 1 | – | 2 | 6 | – | 4 | – | 3 |
| Miami (FL) | 3 | – | 2 | – | 0 | 3 | – | 2 | – | 0 |
| Erskine | 3 | – | 2 | – | 0 | 6 | – | 3 | – | 0 |
| Birmingham–Southern | 4 | – | 3 | – | 0 | 4 | – | 4 | – | 0 |
| Western Kentucky State Normal | 3 | – | 3 | – | 0 | 7 | – | 3 | – | 0 |
| Howard (AL) | 3 | – | 3 | – | 2 | 5 | – | 4 | – | 2 |
| Presbyterian | 3 | – | 3 | – | 0 | 4 | – | 4 | – | 1 |
| Georgetown (KY) | 2 | – | 3 | – | 0 | 4 | – | 5 | – | 0 |
| Wofford | 2 | – | 3 | – | 0 | 3 | – | 6 | – | 0 |
| Oglethorpe | 1 | – | 2 | – | 0 | 5 | – | 4 | – | 1 |
| Kentucky Wesleyan | 1 | – | 3 | – | 0 | 5 | – | 4 | – | 0 |
| Louisiana Tech | 1 | – | 3 | – | 2 | 3 | – | 4 | – | 3 |
| Louisville | 1 | – | 3 | – | 0 | 3 | – | 5 | – | 0 |
| Southern College | 1 | – | 3 | – | 0 | 2 | – | 5 | – | 0 |
| Mercer | 2 | – | 5 | – | 0 | 2 | – | 7 | – | 0 |
| Mississippi College | 1 | – | 4 | – | 1 | 3 | – | 6 | – | 1 |
| SW Louisiana | 1 | – | 5 | – | 0 | 2 | – | 7 | – | 0 |
| Union (TN) | 0 | – | 5 | – | 1 | 1 | – | 5 | – | 1 |
| Newberry | 0 | – | 5 | – | 0 | 0 | – | 7 | – | 1 |
| Rollins | 0 | – | 5 | – | 0 | 0 | – | 5 | – | 0 |
$ – Conference champion

The 1929 Louisiana Normal Demons football team represented the Louisiana State Normal College (now known as Northwestern State University) as a member the Southern Intercollegiate Athletic Association (SIAA) during the 1929 college football season. Led by 16th-year head coach H. Lee Prather, the Demons compiled an overall record of 4–3–2 with a mark of 1–0–2 in conference play.

Schedule

| Date | Time | Opponent | Site | Result | Attendance | Source |
|---|---|---|---|---|---|---|
| September 28 | | at Tulane* | Tulane Stadium; New Orleans, LA | L 6–40 | 10,000 | |
| October 5 | | at East Texas State* | Commerce, TX | W 20–13 | | |
| October 11 | | at Sam Houston State* | Pritchett Field; Huntsville, TX | L 6–26 | | |
| October 19 | | Louisiana College | Normal Athletic Park; Natchitoches, LA | T 13–13 | | |
| October 26 | 2:15 p.m. | Stephen F. Austin* | Natchitoches Fair Grounds; Natchitoches, LA (rivalry) | W 41–6 | 5,000 | |
| November 1 | | at Louisiana Tech | Tech Field; Ruston, LA (rivalry) | T 0–0 | | |
| November 11 | 2:30 p.m. | vs. Magnolia A&M* | State Fair Stadium; Shreveport, LA | L 0–13 | 1,000 | |
| November 16 | | Lon Morris* | Normal Athletic Park; Natchitoches, LA | W 40–14 | | |
| November 28 | | Southwestern Louisiana | Normal Athletic Park; Natchitoches, LA | W 6–0 | 5,000 | |
*Non-conference game; All times are in Central time
