= 1928 Louisville Cardinals football team =

American college football season

1928 Louisville Cardinals football
- Conference: Southern Intercollegiate Athletic Association
- Record: 1–7 (0–4 SIAA)
- Head coach: Tom King (4th season)
- Home stadium: Parkway Field, duPont Manual Stadium

1928 Southern Intercollegiate Athletic Association football standings
	Conf.					Overall
Team	W		L		T	W		L		T
Chattanooga $	8	–	1	–	0	8	–	2	–	0
Mississippi College	6	–	1	–	2	7	–	1	–	2
Western Kentucky State Normal	5	–	1	–	0	8	–	1	–	0
Southern College	4	–	1	–	0	5	–	2	–	1
Transylvania	4	–	1	–	0	8	–	3	–	0
Wofford	5	–	2	–	0	7	–	2	–	1
Furman	3	–	1	–	0	5	–	4	–	0
Millsaps	4	–	2	–	1	5	–	3	–	1
Howard (AL)	4	–	2	–	1	6	–	4	–	1
Centenary	2	–	1	–	1	6	–	3	–	2
Louisiana College	2	–	1	–	0	3	–	5	–	0
The Citadel	4	–	3	–	0	6	–	3	–	1
Southwestern (TN)	2	–	2	–	0	6	–	4	–	0
Birmingham–Southern	2	–	2	–	3	3	–	2	–	4
Mercer	2	–	2	–	1	3	–	5	–	1
Georgetown (KY)	3	–	3	–	0	3	–	6	–	0
SW Louisiana	3	–	4	–	0	4	–	5	–	0
Kentucky Wesleyan	2	–	3	–	0	6	–	3	–	0
Stetson	2	–	3	–	0	4	–	3	–	0
Newberry	2	–	3	–	0	3	–	5	–	0
Spring Hill	2	–	3	–	1	2	–	5	–	1
Oglethorpe	1	–	2	–	0	3	–	5	–	1
Presbyterian	2	–	5	–	0	4	–	6	–	0
Louisiana Normal	1	–	3	–	0	5	–	4	–	0
Union (TN)	2	–	6	–	0	3	–	7	–	0
Centre	1	–	3	–	0	2	–	8	–	0
Louisiana Tech	1	–	6	–	0	2	–	7	–	0
Rollins	0	–	3	–	0	0	–	4	–	0
Louisville	0	–	4	–	0	1	–	7	–	0
Erskine	0	–	5	–	0	2	–	7	–	0
$ – Conference champion

The 1928 Louisville Cardinals football team was an American football team that represented the University of Louisville as member of the Southern Intercollegiate Athletic Association (SIAA) during the 1928 college football season. In their fourth season under head coach Tom King, the Cardinals compiled a 1–7 record.

== Schedule ==
Date	Time	Opponent	Site	Result	Source
October 6		Eastern Kentucky*	Louisville, KY	W 25–6	
October 13		at Detroit*	Dinan Field; Detroit, MI	L 0–46	
October 20		at Chattanooga	Chattanooga, TN	L 0–70	
October 27		Transylvania	Parkway Field; Louisville, KY	L 0–18	
November 3		at Western Kentucky State Normal	Bowling Green, KY	L 0–20	
November 10	2:00 p.m.	Centre	duPont Manual Stadium; Louisville, KY	L 0–7	
November 17		at Saint Louis*	Sportsman's Park; St. Louis, MO	L 0–12	
November 24		Marshall*	Louisville, KY	L 0–13	
*Non-conference game
