= 1928 Millsaps Majors football team =

American college football season

1928 Millsaps Majors football
- Conference: Southern Intercollegiate Athletic Association
- Record: 5–3–1 (4–2–1 SIAA)
- Head coach: Edwin Hale (1st season)

1928 Southern Intercollegiate Athletic Association football standings
	Conf.					Overall
Team	W		L		T	W		L		T
Chattanooga $	8	–	1	–	0	8	–	2	–	0
Mississippi College	6	–	1	–	2	7	–	1	–	2
Western Kentucky State Normal	5	–	1	–	0	8	–	1	–	0
Southern College	4	–	1	–	0	5	–	2	–	1
Transylvania	4	–	1	–	0	8	–	3	–	0
Wofford	5	–	2	–	0	7	–	2	–	1
Furman	3	–	1	–	0	5	–	4	–	0
Millsaps	4	–	2	–	1	5	–	3	–	1
Howard (AL)	4	–	2	–	1	6	–	4	–	1
Centenary	2	–	1	–	1	6	–	3	–	2
Louisiana College	2	–	1	–	0	3	–	5	–	0
The Citadel	4	–	3	–	0	6	–	3	–	1
Southwestern (TN)	2	–	2	–	0	6	–	4	–	0
Birmingham–Southern	2	–	2	–	3	3	–	2	–	4
Mercer	2	–	2	–	1	3	–	5	–	1
Georgetown (KY)	3	–	3	–	0	3	–	6	–	0
SW Louisiana	3	–	4	–	0	4	–	5	–	0
Kentucky Wesleyan	2	–	3	–	0	6	–	3	–	0
Stetson	2	–	3	–	0	4	–	3	–	0
Newberry	2	–	3	–	0	3	–	5	–	0
Spring Hill	2	–	3	–	1	2	–	5	–	1
Oglethorpe	1	–	2	–	0	3	–	5	–	1
Presbyterian	2	–	5	–	0	4	–	6	–	0
Louisiana Normal	1	–	3	–	0	5	–	4	–	0
Union (TN)	2	–	6	–	0	3	–	7	–	0
Centre	1	–	3	–	0	2	–	8	–	0
Louisiana Tech	1	–	6	–	0	2	–	7	–	0
Rollins	0	–	3	–	0	0	–	4	–	0
Louisville	0	–	4	–	0	1	–	7	–	0
Erskine	0	–	5	–	0	2	–	7	–	0
$ – Conference champion

The 1928 Millsaps Majors football team was an American football team that represented Millsaps College as a member of the Southern Intercollegiate Athletic Association (SIAA) during the 1928 college football season. In their first year under head coach Goat Hale, the team compiled a 5–3–1 record.

== Schedule ==
Date	Time	Opponent	Site	Result	Attendance	Source
September 29		Clarke Memorial*	Jackson, MS	W 7–0		
October 6		at Birmingham–Southern	Legion Field; Birmingham, AL	L 0–12		
October 13		at Spring Hill	Hartwell Field; Mobile, AL	W 6–0		
October 19		vs. Mississippi College	Municipal Stadium; Jackson, MS (rivalry)	T 6–6	7,500	
October 27	2:30 p.m.	Louisiana Normal	Municipal Stadium; Jackson, MS	W 32–19		
November 3		at Tulane*	Tulane Stadium; New Orleans, LA	L 0–27		
November 10		at Louisiana Tech	Tech Field; Ruston, LA	L 7–15		
November 17		Southwestern Louisiana	Athletic Field; Jackson, MS	W 31–7		
November 29		Union (TN)	Athletic Field; Jackson, MS	W 51–0		
*Non-conference game; All times are in Central time
