= 1928 Howard Bulldogs football team =

American college football season

1928 Howard Bulldogs football
- Conference: Southern Intercollegiate Athletic Association
- Record: 6–4–1 (4–2–1 SIAA)
- Head coach: Chester C. Dillon (3rd season)
- Home stadium: Legion Field

1928 Southern Intercollegiate Athletic Association football standings
	Conf.					Overall
Team	W		L		T	W		L		T
Chattanooga $	8	–	1	–	0	8	–	2	–	0
Mississippi College	6	–	1	–	2	7	–	1	–	2
Western Kentucky State Normal	5	–	1	–	0	8	–	1	–	0
Southern College	4	–	1	–	0	5	–	2	–	1
Transylvania	4	–	1	–	0	8	–	3	–	0
Wofford	5	–	2	–	0	7	–	2	–	1
Furman	3	–	1	–	0	5	–	4	–	0
Millsaps	4	–	2	–	1	5	–	3	–	1
Howard (AL)	4	–	2	–	1	6	–	4	–	1
Centenary	2	–	1	–	1	6	–	3	–	2
Louisiana College	2	–	1	–	0	3	–	5	–	0
The Citadel	4	–	3	–	0	6	–	3	–	1
Southwestern (TN)	2	–	2	–	0	6	–	4	–	0
Birmingham–Southern	2	–	2	–	3	3	–	2	–	4
Mercer	2	–	2	–	1	3	–	5	–	1
Georgetown (KY)	3	–	3	–	0	3	–	6	–	0
SW Louisiana	3	–	4	–	0	4	–	5	–	0
Kentucky Wesleyan	2	–	3	–	0	6	–	3	–	0
Stetson	2	–	3	–	0	4	–	3	–	0
Newberry	2	–	3	–	0	3	–	5	–	0
Spring Hill	2	–	3	–	1	2	–	5	–	1
Oglethorpe	1	–	2	–	0	3	–	5	–	1
Presbyterian	2	–	5	–	0	4	–	6	–	0
Louisiana Normal	1	–	3	–	0	5	–	4	–	0
Union (TN)	2	–	6	–	0	3	–	7	–	0
Centre	1	–	3	–	0	2	–	8	–	0
Louisiana Tech	1	–	6	–	0	2	–	7	–	0
Rollins	0	–	3	–	0	0	–	4	–	0
Louisville	0	–	4	–	0	1	–	7	–	0
Erskine	0	–	5	–	0	2	–	7	–	0
$ – Conference champion

The 1928 Howard Bulldogs football team was an American football team that represented Howard College (now known as the Samford University) as a member of the Southern Intercollegiate Athletic Association (SIAA) during the 1928 college football season. In their third and final year under head coach Chester C. Dillon, the team compiled a 6–4–1 record.

== Schedule ==
Date	Opponent	Site	Result	Attendance	Source
September 22	at Loyola (LA)*	Loyola University Stadium; New Orleans, LA	L 0–18		
September 28	Spring Hill	Legion Field; Birmingham, AL	L 7–12	4,500	
October 5	Marion*	Legion Field; Birmingham, AL	W 31–6		
October 13	at Mercer	Centennial Stadium; Macon, GA	W 15–7	6,000	
October 20	vs. Louisiana Tech	Forysthe Park; Monroe, LA	W 53–6		
October 27	at Auburn*	Drake Field; Auburn, AL	L 6–25		
November 1	Mississippi College	Legion Field; Birmingham, AL	T 6–6		
November 10	Chattanooga	Legion Field; Birmingham, AL	L 0–14		
November 24	vs. Birmingham–Southern	Legion Field; Birmingham, AL	W 13–12		
November 29	at Miami (FL)*	University Stadium; Coral Gables, FL	W 7–0		
December 1	at Stetson	Hatter Athletic Park; DeLand, FL	W 7–0		
*Non-conference game
