= 1928 Centenary Gentlemen football team =

American college football season

1928 Centenary Gentlemen football
- Conference: Southern Intercollegiate Athletic Association
- Record: 6–3–2 (2–1–1 SIAA)
- Head coach: Homer Norton (6th season)
- Home stadium: Centenary Field

1928 Southern Intercollegiate Athletic Association football standings
	Conf.					Overall
Team	W		L		T	W		L		T
Chattanooga $	8	–	1	–	0	8	–	2	–	0
Mississippi College	6	–	1	–	2	7	–	1	–	2
Western Kentucky State Normal	5	–	1	–	0	8	–	1	–	0
Southern College	4	–	1	–	0	5	–	2	–	1
Transylvania	4	–	1	–	0	8	–	3	–	0
Wofford	5	–	2	–	0	7	–	2	–	1
Furman	3	–	1	–	0	5	–	4	–	0
Millsaps	4	–	2	–	1	5	–	3	–	1
Howard (AL)	4	–	2	–	1	6	–	4	–	1
Centenary	2	–	1	–	1	6	–	3	–	2
Louisiana College	2	–	1	–	0	3	–	5	–	0
The Citadel	4	–	3	–	0	6	–	3	–	1
Southwestern (TN)	2	–	2	–	0	6	–	4	–	0
Birmingham–Southern	2	–	2	–	3	3	–	2	–	4
Mercer	2	–	2	–	1	3	–	5	–	1
Georgetown (KY)	3	–	3	–	0	3	–	6	–	0
SW Louisiana	3	–	4	–	0	4	–	5	–	0
Kentucky Wesleyan	2	–	3	–	0	6	–	3	–	0
Stetson	2	–	3	–	0	4	–	3	–	0
Newberry	2	–	3	–	0	3	–	5	–	0
Spring Hill	2	–	3	–	1	2	–	5	–	1
Oglethorpe	1	–	2	–	0	3	–	5	–	1
Presbyterian	2	–	5	–	0	4	–	6	–	0
Louisiana Normal	1	–	3	–	0	5	–	4	–	0
Union (TN)	2	–	6	–	0	3	–	7	–	0
Centre	1	–	3	–	0	2	–	8	–	0
Louisiana Tech	1	–	6	–	0	2	–	7	–	0
Rollins	0	–	3	–	0	0	–	4	–	0
Louisville	0	–	4	–	0	1	–	7	–	0
Erskine	0	–	5	–	0	2	–	7	–	0
$ – Conference champion

The 1928 Centenary Gentlemen football team was an American football team that represented the Centenary College of Louisiana as a member of the Southern Intercollegiate Athletic Association (SIAA) during the 1928 college football season. In their sixth year under head coach Homer Norton, the team compiled an 6–3–2 record.

== Schedule ==
Date	Opponent	Site	Result	Attendance	Source
September 22	Sam Houston State*	Centenary Field; Shreveport, LA	W 47–0	3,000	
September 29	Southwestern Louisiana	Centenary Field; Shreveport, LA	W 46–0		
October 6	Daniel Baker*	Centenary Field; Shreveport, LA	W 20–12		
October 13	at Texas A&M*	Kyle Field; College Station, TX	W 6–0		
October 20	Baylor*	Centenary Field; Shreveport, LA	L 7–28	6,000	
October 27	at Chattanooga	Chamberlain Field; Chattanooga, TN	L 14–21		
November 3	at Birmingham–Southern	Legion Field; Birmingham, AL	T 0–0		
November 10	at Mississippi A&M*	Scott Field; Starkville, MS	T 6–6		
November 17	Louisiana Tech	Centenary Field; Shreveport, LA	W 63–2	4,000	
November 24	at Loyola (LA)*	Loyola Stadium; New Orleans, LA	L 6–23		
November 29	Lombard*	Centenary Field; Shreveport, LA	W 19–7		
*Non-conference game
