= 1928 Western Kentucky State Normal Hilltoppers football team =

American college football season

1928 Western Kentucky State Normal Hilltoppers football

State champion
- Conference: Southern Intercollegiate Athletic Association
- Record: 8–1 (5–1 SIAA)
- Head coach: Edgar Diddle (7th season)

1928 Southern Intercollegiate Athletic Association football standings
	Conf.					Overall
Team	W		L		T	W		L		T
Chattanooga $	8	–	1	–	0	8	–	2	–	0
Mississippi College	6	–	1	–	2	7	–	1	–	2
Western Kentucky State Normal	5	–	1	–	0	8	–	1	–	0
Southern College	4	–	1	–	0	5	–	2	–	1
Transylvania	4	–	1	–	0	8	–	3	–	0
Wofford	5	–	2	–	0	7	–	2	–	1
Furman	3	–	1	–	0	5	–	4	–	0
Millsaps	4	–	2	–	1	5	–	3	–	1
Howard (AL)	4	–	2	–	1	6	–	4	–	1
Centenary	2	–	1	–	1	6	–	3	–	2
Louisiana College	2	–	1	–	0	3	–	5	–	0
The Citadel	4	–	3	–	0	6	–	3	–	1
Southwestern (TN)	2	–	2	–	0	6	–	4	–	0
Birmingham–Southern	2	–	2	–	3	3	–	2	–	4
Mercer	2	–	2	–	1	3	–	5	–	1
Georgetown (KY)	3	–	3	–	0	3	–	6	–	0
SW Louisiana	3	–	4	–	0	4	–	5	–	0
Kentucky Wesleyan	2	–	3	–	0	6	–	3	–	0
Stetson	2	–	3	–	0	4	–	3	–	0
Newberry	2	–	3	–	0	3	–	5	–	0
Spring Hill	2	–	3	–	1	2	–	5	–	1
Oglethorpe	1	–	2	–	0	3	–	5	–	1
Presbyterian	2	–	5	–	0	4	–	6	–	0
Louisiana Normal	1	–	3	–	0	5	–	4	–	0
Union (TN)	2	–	6	–	0	3	–	7	–	0
Centre	1	–	3	–	0	2	–	8	–	0
Louisiana Tech	1	–	6	–	0	2	–	7	–	0
Rollins	0	–	3	–	0	0	–	4	–	0
Louisville	0	–	4	–	0	1	–	7	–	0
Erskine	0	–	5	–	0	2	–	7	–	0
$ – Conference champion

The 1928 Western Kentucky State Normal Hilltoppers football team represented Western Kentucky State Normal School and Teachers College (now known as Western Kentucky University) in the 1928 college football season. They were coached by legendary basketball coach Edgar Diddle in his last season as football coach. This team defeated all other Kentucky teams on its schedule and claimed to be state champions. Turner Elrod, Paul Taylor, and Lynn Williams were named to the All Kentucky Team.

== Schedule ==
Date	Time	Opponent	Site	Result	Attendance	Source
September 29	2:30 p.m.	at Centre	Cheek Field; Danville, KY	W 12–0	2,000	
October 6		Southwestern (TN)	Bowling Green, KY	W 18–0		
October 13		Bethel (TN)	Bowling Green, KY	W 39–0		
October 20		at Middle Tennessee State Teachers	Murfreesboro, TN (rivalry)	W 19–0		
October 27		Georgetown (KY)^{†}	Bowling Green, KY	W 19–0		
November 3		Louisville	Bowling Green, KY	W 20–0		
November 10		Kentucky Wesleyan	Bowling Green, KY	W 13–0		
November 16		at Union (TN)	Jackson, TN	L 6–7		
November 24		Cumberland (KY)	Bowling Green, KY	W 25–0		
^{†}Homecoming; All times are in Central time
