= 1928 Furman Purple Hurricane football team =

American college football season

1928 Furman Purple Hurricane football
- Conference: Southern Intercollegiate Athletic Association
- Record: 5–4 (3–1 SIAA)
- Head coach: T. B. Amis (1st season)
- Captain: Sam Lemmond
- Home stadium: Manly Field

1928 Southern Intercollegiate Athletic Association football standings
	Conf.					Overall
Team	W		L		T	W		L		T
Chattanooga $	8	–	1	–	0	8	–	2	–	0
Mississippi College	6	–	1	–	2	7	–	1	–	2
Western Kentucky State Normal	5	–	1	–	0	8	–	1	–	0
Southern College	4	–	1	–	0	5	–	2	–	1
Transylvania	4	–	1	–	0	8	–	3	–	0
Wofford	5	–	2	–	0	7	–	2	–	1
Furman	3	–	1	–	0	5	–	4	–	0
Millsaps	4	–	2	–	1	5	–	3	–	1
Howard (AL)	4	–	2	–	1	6	–	4	–	1
Centenary	2	–	1	–	1	6	–	3	–	2
Louisiana College	2	–	1	–	0	3	–	5	–	0
The Citadel	4	–	3	–	0	6	–	3	–	1
Southwestern (TN)	2	–	2	–	0	6	–	4	–	0
Birmingham–Southern	2	–	2	–	3	3	–	2	–	4
Mercer	2	–	2	–	1	3	–	5	–	1
Georgetown (KY)	3	–	3	–	0	3	–	6	–	0
SW Louisiana	3	–	4	–	0	4	–	5	–	0
Kentucky Wesleyan	2	–	3	–	0	6	–	3	–	0
Stetson	2	–	3	–	0	4	–	3	–	0
Newberry	2	–	3	–	0	3	–	5	–	0
Spring Hill	2	–	3	–	1	2	–	5	–	1
Oglethorpe	1	–	2	–	0	3	–	5	–	1
Presbyterian	2	–	5	–	0	4	–	6	–	0
Louisiana Normal	1	–	3	–	0	5	–	4	–	0
Union (TN)	2	–	6	–	0	3	–	7	–	0
Centre	1	–	3	–	0	2	–	8	–	0
Louisiana Tech	1	–	6	–	0	2	–	7	–	0
Rollins	0	–	3	–	0	0	–	4	–	0
Louisville	0	–	4	–	0	1	–	7	–	0
Erskine	0	–	5	–	0	2	–	7	–	0
$ – Conference champion

The 1928 Furman Purple Hurricane football team represented the Furman University as a member of the Southern Intercollegiate Athletic Association (SIAA) during the 1928 college football season. Led by first year head coach T. B. Amis, the Purple Hurricane compiled an overall record of 5–4, with a mark of 3–1 in conference play, and finished tied for sixth in the SIAA.

== Schedule ==
Date	Opponent	Site	Result	Attendance	Source
September 29	Duke*	Manly Field; Greenville, SC	W 6–0		
October 6	Chattanooga	Manly Field; Greenville, SC	L 0–15		
October 13	Presbyterian	Manly Field; Greenville, SC	W 6–0		
October 19	at Georgia*	Sanford Field; Athens, GA	L 0–7		
October 27	Wofford	Manly Field; Greenville, SC (rivalry)	W 26–0		
November 3	vs. Wake Forest*	Wearn Field; Charlotte, NC	W 18–0	5,000	
November 10	The Citadel	Manly Field; Greenville, SC (rivalry)	W 13–0		
November 17	at South Carolina*	Melton Field; Columbia, SC	L 0–6		
November 29	Clemson*	Manly Field; Greenville, SC	L 12–27	12,500	
*Non-conference game
