= 1928 Louisiana Tech Bulldogs football team =

American college football season

1928 Louisiana Tech Bulldogs football
- Conference: Southern Intercollegiate Athletic Association
- Record: 2–7 (1–6 SIAA)
- Head coach: Tod Rockwell (1st season)
- Captain: Bill Slay
- Home stadium: Tech Field

1928 Southern Intercollegiate Athletic Association football standings
	Conf.					Overall
Team	W		L		T	W		L		T
Chattanooga $	8	–	1	–	0	8	–	2	–	0
Mississippi College	6	–	1	–	2	7	–	1	–	2
Western Kentucky State Normal	5	–	1	–	0	8	–	1	–	0
Southern College	4	–	1	–	0	5	–	2	–	1
Transylvania	4	–	1	–	0	8	–	3	–	0
Wofford	5	–	2	–	0	7	–	2	–	1
Furman	3	–	1	–	0	5	–	4	–	0
Millsaps	4	–	2	–	1	5	–	3	–	1
Howard (AL)	4	–	2	–	1	6	–	4	–	1
Centenary	2	–	1	–	1	6	–	3	–	2
Louisiana College	2	–	1	–	0	3	–	5	–	0
The Citadel	4	–	3	–	0	6	–	3	–	1
Southwestern (TN)	2	–	2	–	0	6	–	4	–	0
Birmingham–Southern	2	–	2	–	3	3	–	2	–	4
Mercer	2	–	2	–	1	3	–	5	–	1
Georgetown (KY)	3	–	3	–	0	3	–	6	–	0
SW Louisiana	3	–	4	–	0	4	–	5	–	0
Kentucky Wesleyan	2	–	3	–	0	6	–	3	–	0
Stetson	2	–	3	–	0	4	–	3	–	0
Newberry	2	–	3	–	0	3	–	5	–	0
Spring Hill	2	–	3	–	1	2	–	5	–	1
Oglethorpe	1	–	2	–	0	3	–	5	–	1
Presbyterian	2	–	5	–	0	4	–	6	–	0
Louisiana Normal	1	–	3	–	0	5	–	4	–	0
Union (TN)	2	–	6	–	0	3	–	7	–	0
Centre	1	–	3	–	0	2	–	8	–	0
Louisiana Tech	1	–	6	–	0	2	–	7	–	0
Rollins	0	–	3	–	0	0	–	4	–	0
Louisville	0	–	4	–	0	1	–	7	–	0
Erskine	0	–	5	–	0	2	–	7	–	0
$ – Conference champion

The 1928 Louisiana Tech Bulldogs football team was an American football team that represented the Louisiana Polytechnic Institute—now known as Louisiana Tech University—as a member of the Southern Intercollegiate Athletic Association (SIAA) during the 1928 college football season. Led by first-year head coach Tod Rockwell, Louisiana Tech compiled an overall record of 2–7. The team's captain was Bill Slay.

== Schedule ==
Date	Time	Opponent	Site	Result	Attendance	Source
September 29	2:30 p.m.	Ozarks*	Tech Field; Ruston, LA	L 0–18		
October 6		Clarke College (MS)*	Tech Field; Ruston, LA	W 19–6		
October 13		at Louisiana Normal	Natchitoches Parish Fair Grounds; Natchitoches, LA (rivalry)	L 0–6	3,000	
October 20	2:30 p.m.	vs. Howard (AL)	Forysthe Park; Monroe, LA	L 6–53		
October 27	2:30 p.m.	Union (TN)	Louisiana State Fair Grounds; Shreveport, LA	L 0–26		
November 3		Southwestern Louisiana	Tech Field; Ruston, LA (rivalry)	L 6–45		
November 10		Millsaps^{†}	Tech Field; Ruston, LA	W 15–7		
November 17		at Centenary	Shreveport, LA	L 2–63	4,000	
November 29		Mississippi College	Forysthe Park; Monroe, LA	L 0–12		
*Non-conference game; ^{†}Homecoming; All times are in Central time
