= 1928 Southern College Moccasins football team =

American college football season

1928 Southern College Moccasins football
- Conference: Southern Intercollegiate Athletic Association
- Record: 5–2–1 (4–1 SIAA)
- Head coach: Jesse Burbage (1st season)
- Home stadium: College Field

1928 Southern Intercollegiate Athletic Association football standings
	Conf.					Overall
Team	W		L		T	W		L		T
Chattanooga $	8	–	1	–	0	8	–	2	–	0
Mississippi College	6	–	1	–	2	7	–	1	–	2
Western Kentucky State Normal	5	–	1	–	0	8	–	1	–	0
Southern College	4	–	1	–	0	5	–	2	–	1
Transylvania	4	–	1	–	0	8	–	3	–	0
Wofford	5	–	2	–	0	7	–	2	–	1
Furman	3	–	1	–	0	5	–	4	–	0
Millsaps	4	–	2	–	1	5	–	3	–	1
Howard (AL)	4	–	2	–	1	6	–	4	–	1
Centenary	2	–	1	–	1	6	–	3	–	2
Louisiana College	2	–	1	–	0	3	–	5	–	0
The Citadel	4	–	3	–	0	6	–	3	–	1
Southwestern (TN)	2	–	2	–	0	6	–	4	–	0
Birmingham–Southern	2	–	2	–	3	3	–	2	–	4
Mercer	2	–	2	–	1	3	–	5	–	1
Georgetown (KY)	3	–	3	–	0	3	–	6	–	0
SW Louisiana	3	–	4	–	0	4	–	5	–	0
Kentucky Wesleyan	2	–	3	–	0	6	–	3	–	0
Stetson	2	–	3	–	0	4	–	3	–	0
Newberry	2	–	3	–	0	3	–	5	–	0
Spring Hill	2	–	3	–	1	2	–	5	–	1
Oglethorpe	1	–	2	–	0	3	–	5	–	1
Presbyterian	2	–	5	–	0	4	–	6	–	0
Louisiana Normal	1	–	3	–	0	5	–	4	–	0
Union (TN)	2	–	6	–	0	3	–	7	–	0
Centre	1	–	3	–	0	2	–	8	–	0
Louisiana Tech	1	–	6	–	0	2	–	7	–	0
Rollins	0	–	3	–	0	0	–	4	–	0
Louisville	0	–	4	–	0	1	–	7	–	0
Erskine	0	–	5	–	0	2	–	7	–	0
$ – Conference champion

The 1928 Southern College Moccasins football team was an American football team that represented Southern College (now known as Florida Southern College) as a member of the Southern Intercollegiate Athletic Association (SIAA) during the 1928 college football season. In their first year under head coach Jesse Burbage, the team compiled a 5–2–1 record.

== Schedule ==
Date	Opponent	Site	Result	Attendance	Source
October 6	at Florida*	Fleming Field; Gainesville, FL	L 0–26	4,000	
October 20	Piedmont*	College Field; Lakeland, FL	W 27–0		
October 28	Tampa Athletic Club*	College Field; Lakeland, FL	Canceled		
November 3	at Stetson	DeLand, FL	W 13–0		
November 12	vs. Erskine	Lake Wales, FL	W 18–0	5,000	
November 24	Rollins	College Field; Lakeland, FL	W 58–0		
November 29	Wofford	College Field; Lakeland, FL	W 13–7		
December 8	Chattanooga	College Field; Lakeland, FL	L 0–19		
January 1	at Miami (FL)*	University Stadium; Coral Gables, FL	T 13–13		
*Non-conference game
