= 1928 Spring Hill Badgers football team =

American college football season

1928 Spring Hill Badgers football
- Conference: Southern Intercollegiate Athletic Association
- Record: 2–5–1 (2–3–1 SIAA)
- Head coach: William T. Daly (4th season)
- Home stadium: Hartwell Field

1928 Southern Intercollegiate Athletic Association football standings
	Conf.					Overall
Team	W		L		T	W		L		T
Chattanooga $	8	–	1	–	0	8	–	2	–	0
Mississippi College	6	–	1	–	2	7	–	1	–	2
Western Kentucky State Normal	5	–	1	–	0	8	–	1	–	0
Southern College	4	–	1	–	0	5	–	2	–	1
Transylvania	4	–	1	–	0	8	–	3	–	0
Wofford	5	–	2	–	0	7	–	2	–	1
Furman	3	–	1	–	0	5	–	4	–	0
Millsaps	4	–	2	–	1	5	–	3	–	1
Howard (AL)	4	–	2	–	1	6	–	4	–	1
Centenary	2	–	1	–	1	6	–	3	–	2
Louisiana College	2	–	1	–	0	3	–	5	–	0
The Citadel	4	–	3	–	0	6	–	3	–	1
Southwestern (TN)	2	–	2	–	0	6	–	4	–	0
Birmingham–Southern	2	–	2	–	3	3	–	2	–	4
Mercer	2	–	2	–	1	3	–	5	–	1
Georgetown (KY)	3	–	3	–	0	3	–	6	–	0
SW Louisiana	3	–	4	–	0	4	–	5	–	0
Kentucky Wesleyan	2	–	3	–	0	6	–	3	–	0
Stetson	2	–	3	–	0	4	–	3	–	0
Newberry	2	–	3	–	0	3	–	5	–	0
Spring Hill	2	–	3	–	1	2	–	5	–	1
Oglethorpe	1	–	2	–	0	3	–	5	–	1
Presbyterian	2	–	5	–	0	4	–	6	–	0
Louisiana Normal	1	–	3	–	0	5	–	4	–	0
Union (TN)	2	–	6	–	0	3	–	7	–	0
Centre	1	–	3	–	0	2	–	8	–	0
Louisiana Tech	1	–	6	–	0	2	–	7	–	0
Rollins	0	–	3	–	0	0	–	4	–	0
Louisville	0	–	4	–	0	1	–	7	–	0
Erskine	0	–	5	–	0	2	–	7	–	0
$ – Conference champion

The 1928 Spring Hill Badgers football team was an American football team that represented Spring Hill College, a Jesuit college in Mobile, Alabama, as member of the Southern Intercollegiate Athletic Association (SIAA) during the 1928 college football season. In its fourth season under head coach William T. Daly, the team compiled an overall record of 2–5–1 with a mark of 2–3–1 in SIAA play.

== Schedule ==
Date	Opponent	Site	Result	Attendance	Source
September 28	at Howard (AL)	Legion Field; Birmingham, AL	W 12–7	4,500	
October 5	at Mississippi College	Provine Field; Clinton, MS	L 0–15		
October 13	Millsaps	Hartwell Field; Mobile, AL	L 0–6		
October 20	Southwestern Louisiana	Hartwell Field; Mobile, AL	L 0–6		
October 27	at LSU*	Tiger Stadium; Baton Rouge, LA	L 7–30		
November 3	Union (TN)	Hartwell Field; Mobile, AL	W 26–6		
November 17	Birmingham–Southern	Hartwell Field; Mobile, AL	T 0–0		
November 29	Loyola (LA)*	Hartwell Field; Mobile, AL	L 6–45	5,000	
*Non-conference game
