= 1928 Birmingham–Southern Panthers football team =

American college football season

1928 Birmingham–Southern Panthers football
- Conference: Southern Intercollegiate Athletic Association
- Record: 3–2–4 (2–2–3 SIAA)
- Head coach: Jenks Gillem (1st season)
- Home stadium: Legion Field

1928 Southern Intercollegiate Athletic Association football standings
	Conf.					Overall
Team	W		L		T	W		L		T
Chattanooga $	8	–	1	–	0	8	–	2	–	0
Mississippi College	6	–	1	–	2	7	–	1	–	2
Western Kentucky State Normal	5	–	1	–	0	8	–	1	–	0
Southern College	4	–	1	–	0	5	–	2	–	1
Transylvania	4	–	1	–	0	8	–	3	–	0
Wofford	5	–	2	–	0	7	–	2	–	1
Furman	3	–	1	–	0	5	–	4	–	0
Millsaps	4	–	2	–	1	5	–	3	–	1
Howard (AL)	4	–	2	–	1	6	–	4	–	1
Centenary	2	–	1	–	1	6	–	3	–	2
Louisiana College	2	–	1	–	0	3	–	5	–	0
The Citadel	4	–	3	–	0	6	–	3	–	1
Southwestern (TN)	2	–	2	–	0	6	–	4	–	0
Birmingham–Southern	2	–	2	–	3	3	–	2	–	4
Mercer	2	–	2	–	1	3	–	5	–	1
Georgetown (KY)	3	–	3	–	0	3	–	6	–	0
SW Louisiana	3	–	4	–	0	4	–	5	–	0
Kentucky Wesleyan	2	–	3	–	0	6	–	3	–	0
Stetson	2	–	3	–	0	4	–	3	–	0
Newberry	2	–	3	–	0	3	–	5	–	0
Spring Hill	2	–	3	–	1	2	–	5	–	1
Oglethorpe	1	–	2	–	0	3	–	5	–	1
Presbyterian	2	–	5	–	0	4	–	6	–	0
Louisiana Normal	1	–	3	–	0	5	–	4	–	0
Union (TN)	2	–	6	–	0	3	–	7	–	0
Centre	1	–	3	–	0	2	–	8	–	0
Louisiana Tech	1	–	6	–	0	2	–	7	–	0
Rollins	0	–	3	–	0	0	–	4	–	0
Louisville	0	–	4	–	0	1	–	7	–	0
Erskine	0	–	5	–	0	2	–	7	–	0
$ – Conference champion

The 1928 Birmingham–Southern Panthers football team was an American football team that represented Birmingham–Southern College as a member of the Southern Intercollegiate Athletic Association during the 1928 college football season. In their first season under head coach Jenks Gillem, the team compiled a 3–2–4 record.

== Schedule ==
Date	Opponent	Site	Result	Source
September 28	at Auburn*	Cramton Bowl; Montgomery, AL	W 6–0	
October 6	Millsaps	Legion Field; Birmingham, AL	W 12–0	
October 13	Chattanooga	Legion Field; Birmingham, AL	L 6–12	
October 19	at Marion*	Rowell Field; Selma, AL	T 7–7	
October 26	at Mercer	Centennial Stadium; Macon, GA	T 20–20	
November 3	Centenary (LA)	Legion Field; Birmingham, AL	T 0–0	
November 10	at Mississippi College	Provine Field; Clinton, MS	W 19–7	
November 17	at Spring Hill	Mobile, AL	T 0–0	
November 24	vs. Howard (AL)	Legion Field; Birmingham, AL	L 12–13	
*Non-conference game
