= 1928 Mississippi College Choctaws football team =

American college football season

1928 Mississippi College Choctaws football
- Conference: Southern Intercollegiate Athletic Association
- Record: 7–1–2 (6–1–2 SIAA)
- Head coach: Stanley L. Robinson (4th season)
- Home stadium: Provine Field

1928 Southern Intercollegiate Athletic Association football standings
	Conf.					Overall
Team	W		L		T	W		L		T
Chattanooga $	8	–	1	–	0	8	–	2	–	0
Mississippi College	6	–	1	–	2	7	–	1	–	2
Western Kentucky State Normal	5	–	1	–	0	8	–	1	–	0
Southern College	4	–	1	–	0	5	–	2	–	1
Transylvania	4	–	1	–	0	8	–	3	–	0
Wofford	5	–	2	–	0	7	–	2	–	1
Furman	3	–	1	–	0	5	–	4	–	0
Millsaps	4	–	2	–	1	5	–	3	–	1
Howard (AL)	4	–	2	–	1	6	–	4	–	1
Centenary	2	–	1	–	1	6	–	3	–	2
Louisiana College	2	–	1	–	0	3	–	5	–	0
The Citadel	4	–	3	–	0	6	–	3	–	1
Southwestern (TN)	2	–	2	–	0	6	–	4	–	0
Birmingham–Southern	2	–	2	–	3	3	–	2	–	4
Mercer	2	–	2	–	1	3	–	5	–	1
Georgetown (KY)	3	–	3	–	0	3	–	6	–	0
SW Louisiana	3	–	4	–	0	4	–	5	–	0
Kentucky Wesleyan	2	–	3	–	0	6	–	3	–	0
Stetson	2	–	3	–	0	4	–	3	–	0
Newberry	2	–	3	–	0	3	–	5	–	0
Spring Hill	2	–	3	–	1	2	–	5	–	1
Oglethorpe	1	–	2	–	0	3	–	5	–	1
Presbyterian	2	–	5	–	0	4	–	6	–	0
Louisiana Normal	1	–	3	–	0	5	–	4	–	0
Union (TN)	2	–	6	–	0	3	–	7	–	0
Centre	1	–	3	–	0	2	–	8	–	0
Louisiana Tech	1	–	6	–	0	2	–	7	–	0
Rollins	0	–	3	–	0	0	–	4	–	0
Louisville	0	–	4	–	0	1	–	7	–	0
Erskine	0	–	5	–	0	2	–	7	–	0
$ – Conference champion

The 1928 Mississippi College Choctaws football team was an American football team that represented Mississippi College as a member of the Southern Intercollegiate Athletic Association (SIAA) during the 1928 college football season. In their fourth year under head coach Stanley L. Robinson, the team compiled a 7–1–2 record.

== Schedule ==
Date	Opponent	Site	Result	Attendance	Source
September 29	Mississippi State Teachers*	Provine Field; Clinton, MS	W 83–0		
October 5	Spring Hill	Provine Field; Clinton, MS	W 15–0		
October 13	at Southwestern Louisiana	Campus Athletic Field; Lafayette, LA	W 19–0		
October 19	vs. Millsaps	Municipal Stadium; Jackson, MS (rivalry)	T 6–6	7,500	
October 27	vs. Louisiana College	Vicksburg, MS	W 13–0		
November 1	at Howard (AL)	Legion Field; Birmingham, AL	T 6–6		
November 10	Birmingham–Southern	Provine Field; Clinton, MS	L 7–19		
November 17	at Chattanooga	Chamberlain Field; Chattanooga, TN	W 20–19		
November 24	Union (TN)	Provine Field; Clinton, MS	W 35–13	3,000	
November 29	vs. Louisiana Tech	Forysthe Park; Monroe, LA	W 0–12		
*Non-conference game
