= 1928 Centre Colonels football team =

American college football season

1928 Centre Colonels football
- Conference: Southern Intercollegiate Athletic Association
- Record: 2–8 (1–3 SIAA)
- Head coach: Boise Potthoff (1st season)
- Home stadium: Cheek Field

1928 Southern Intercollegiate Athletic Association football standings
	Conf.					Overall
Team	W		L		T	W		L		T
Chattanooga $	8	–	1	–	0	8	–	2	–	0
Mississippi College	6	–	1	–	2	7	–	1	–	2
Western Kentucky State Normal	5	–	1	–	0	8	–	1	–	0
Southern College	4	–	1	–	0	5	–	2	–	1
Transylvania	4	–	1	–	0	8	–	3	–	0
Wofford	5	–	2	–	0	7	–	2	–	1
Furman	3	–	1	–	0	5	–	4	–	0
Millsaps	4	–	2	–	1	5	–	3	–	1
Howard (AL)	4	–	2	–	1	6	–	4	–	1
Centenary	2	–	1	–	1	6	–	3	–	2
Louisiana College	2	–	1	–	0	3	–	5	–	0
The Citadel	4	–	3	–	0	6	–	3	–	1
Southwestern (TN)	2	–	2	–	0	6	–	4	–	0
Birmingham–Southern	2	–	2	–	3	3	–	2	–	4
Mercer	2	–	2	–	1	3	–	5	–	1
Georgetown (KY)	3	–	3	–	0	3	–	6	–	0
SW Louisiana	3	–	4	–	0	4	–	5	–	0
Kentucky Wesleyan	2	–	3	–	0	6	–	3	–	0
Stetson	2	–	3	–	0	4	–	3	–	0
Newberry	2	–	3	–	0	3	–	5	–	0
Spring Hill	2	–	3	–	1	2	–	5	–	1
Oglethorpe	1	–	2	–	0	3	–	5	–	1
Presbyterian	2	–	5	–	0	4	–	6	–	0
Louisiana Normal	1	–	3	–	0	5	–	4	–	0
Union (TN)	2	–	6	–	0	3	–	7	–	0
Centre	1	–	3	–	0	2	–	8	–	0
Louisiana Tech	1	–	6	–	0	2	–	7	–	0
Rollins	0	–	3	–	0	0	–	4	–	0
Louisville	0	–	4	–	0	1	–	7	–	0
Erskine	0	–	5	–	0	2	–	7	–	0
$ – Conference champion

The 1928 Centre Colonels football team represented Centre College as a member of the Southern Intercollegiate Athletic Association (SIAA) during the 1928 college football season. Led by Boise Potthoff in his first and only season as head coach, the Colonels compiled an overall record of 6–3 and with a mark of 1–3 in SIAA play. The team played home games at Cheek Field in Danville, Kentucky.

== Schedule ==
Date	Time	Opponent	Site	Result	Attendance	Source
September 22	2:30 p.m.	Transylvania	Cheek Field; Danville, KY	L 0–6	4,000	
September 29	2:30 p.m.	Western Kentucky State Normal	Cheek Field; Danville, KY	L 0–29	2,000	
October 6	2:30 p.m.	at Tennessee*	Shields–Watkins Field; Knoxville, TN	L 7–41		
October 13	2:00 p.m.	at Missouri*	Memorial Stadium; Columbia, MO	L 0–60	8,500	
October 20	2:30 p.m.	at Kentucky Wesleyan	College field; Winchester, KY	L 0–6	3,000	
October 27	2:30 p.m.	at Kentucky*	Stoll Field; Lexington, KY (rivalry)	L 0–8	5,000–6,000	
November 3		at Marshall*	Fairfield Stadium; Huntington, WV	W 20–6		
November 10	2:00 p.m.	at Louisville	duPont Manual Stadium; Louisville, KY	W 7–0		
November 17	1:30 p.m.	at St. Xavier*	Corcoran Field; Cincinnati, OH	L 7–20	6,000	
November 24	2:00 p.m.	at Vanderbilt*	Dudley Field; Nashville, TN	L 0–26		
*Non-conference game; All times are in Central time
