= 1928 Chattanooga Moccasins football team =

American college football season

1928 Chattanooga Moccasins football

SIAA champion
- Conference: Southern Intercollegiate Athletic Association
- Record: 8–2 (8–1 SIAA)
- Head coach: Frank Thomas (4th season)
- Captain: Cleve Barrett
- Home stadium: Chamberlain Field

1928 Southern Intercollegiate Athletic Association football standings
	Conf.					Overall
Team	W		L		T	W		L		T
Chattanooga $	8	–	1	–	0	8	–	2	–	0
Mississippi College	6	–	1	–	2	7	–	1	–	2
Western Kentucky State Normal	5	–	1	–	0	8	–	1	–	0
Southern College	4	–	1	–	0	5	–	2	–	1
Transylvania	4	–	1	–	0	8	–	3	–	0
Wofford	5	–	2	–	0	7	–	2	–	1
Furman	3	–	1	–	0	5	–	4	–	0
Millsaps	4	–	2	–	1	5	–	3	–	1
Howard (AL)	4	–	2	–	1	6	–	4	–	1
Centenary	2	–	1	–	1	6	–	3	–	2
Louisiana College	2	–	1	–	0	3	–	5	–	0
The Citadel	4	–	3	–	0	6	–	3	–	1
Southwestern (TN)	2	–	2	–	0	6	–	4	–	0
Birmingham–Southern	2	–	2	–	3	3	–	2	–	4
Mercer	2	–	2	–	1	3	–	5	–	1
Georgetown (KY)	3	–	3	–	0	3	–	6	–	0
SW Louisiana	3	–	4	–	0	4	–	5	–	0
Kentucky Wesleyan	2	–	3	–	0	6	–	3	–	0
Stetson	2	–	3	–	0	4	–	3	–	0
Newberry	2	–	3	–	0	3	–	5	–	0
Spring Hill	2	–	3	–	1	2	–	5	–	1
Oglethorpe	1	–	2	–	0	3	–	5	–	1
Presbyterian	2	–	5	–	0	4	–	6	–	0
Louisiana Normal	1	–	3	–	0	5	–	4	–	0
Union (TN)	2	–	6	–	0	3	–	7	–	0
Centre	1	–	3	–	0	2	–	8	–	0
Louisiana Tech	1	–	6	–	0	2	–	7	–	0
Rollins	0	–	3	–	0	0	–	4	–	0
Louisville	0	–	4	–	0	1	–	7	–	0
Erskine	0	–	5	–	0	2	–	7	–	0
$ – Conference champion

The 1928 Chattanooga Moccasins football team represented the University of Chattanooga as a member of the Southern Intercollegiate Athletic Association (SIAA) during the 1928 college football season. The team won the SIAA championship.

== Schedule ==
Date	Opponent	Site	Result	Source
September 29	Vanderbilt*	Chamberlain Field; Chattanooga, TN	L 0–20	
October 6	at Furman	Manly Field; Greenville, SC	W 15–0	
October 13	at Birmingham–Southern	Legion Field; Birmingham, AL	W 12–6	
October 20	Louisville	Chamberlain Field; Chattanooga, TN	W 70–0	
October 27	Centenary	Chamberlain Field; Chattanooga, TN	W 21–14	
November 3	Southwestern (TN)	Chamberlain Field; Chattanooga, TN	W 79–0	
November 10	Howard (AL)	Legion Field; Birmingham, AL	W 14–0	
November 17	Mississippi College	Chamberlain Field; Chattanooga, TN	L 19–20	
November 29	Oglethorpe	Chamberlain Field; Chattanooga, TN	W 35–9	
December 8	at Florida Southern	College Field; Lakeland, FL	W 19–0	
*Non-conference game
