= 1928 St. Xavier Musketeers football team =

American college football season

1928 St. Xavier Musketeers football
- Conference: Ohio Athletic Conference
- Record: 7–2 (1–0 OAC)
- Head coach: Joseph A. Meyer (9th season)
- Home stadium: Corcoran Field

1928 Ohio Athletic Conference football standings
	Conf.					Overall
Team	W		L		T	W		L		T
Heidelberg $	6	–	0	–	1	6	–	0	–	1
Mount Union	4	–	2	–	0	4	–	5	–	0
Muskingum	4	–	2	–	1	4	–	4	–	1
Oberlin	3	–	2	–	1	4	–	3	–	1
Wooster	2	–	2	–	2	2	–	4	–	2
Akron	3	–	4	–	0	5	–	4	–	0
Hiram	3	–	4	–	0	4	–	4	–	0
Otterbein	3	–	4	–	0	3	–	5	–	0
Ohio Northern	2	–	3	–	0	2	–	6	–	1
Case	1	–	4	–	1	2	–	6	–	1
Capital	1	–	5	–	0	1	–	6	–	1
St. Xavier	0	–	1	–	0	7	–	2	–	0
Baldwin–Wallace	0	–	8	–	0	0	–	8	–	0
Kenyon	0	–	5	–	0	0	–	7	–	0
Western Reserve *	8	–	0	–	0	8	–	0	–	0
Marietta *	4	–	0	–	0	4	–	2	–	1
Dayton *	2	–	0	–	0	6	–	3	–	0
$ – Conference champion; * – did not compete for championship

The 1928 St. Xavier Musketeers football team was an American football team that represented St. Xavier College (later renamed Xavier University) in the Ohio Athletic Conference (OAC) during the 1928 college football season. In its ninth season under head coach Joseph A. Meyer, the team compiled a 7–2 record (1–0 against OAC opponents) and outscored opponents by a total of 152 to 46. The team played its home games at Corcoran Field in Cincinnati.

== Schedule ==
Date	Time	Opponent	Site	Result	Attendance	Source
September 29		Transylvania*	Corcoran Field; Cincinnati, OH	W 19–2		
October 6		Morehead State*	Corcoran Field; Cincinnati, OH	W 45–6		
October 20		Oglethorpe*	Corcoran Field; Cincinnati, OH	W 9–6		
October 27		Quantico Marines*	Corcoran Field; Cincinnati, OH	L 0–6	10,000	
November 3		Kansas Wesleyan*	Corcoran Field; Cincinnati, OH	W 19–0		
November 10		Western Reserve	Corcoran Field; Cincinnati, OH	W 7–0		
November 17	1:30 p.m.	Centre*	Corcoran Field; Cincinnati, OH	W 20–7	6,000	
November 24		West Virginia Wesleyan*^{†}	Corcoran Field; Cincinnati, OH	L 7–19	7,000	
November 29		Haskell*	Corcoran Field; Cincinnati, OH	W 26–0	13,000	
*Non-conference game; ^{†}Homecoming; All times are in Eastern time
