= 1928 Southwestern Louisiana Bulldogs football team =

American college football season

1928 Southwestern Louisiana Bulldogs football
- Conference: Southern Intercollegiate Athletic Association
- Record: 4–5 (3–4 SIAA)
- Head coach: T. R. Mobley (10th season)
- Home stadium: Campus Athletic Field

1928 Southern Intercollegiate Athletic Association football standings
	Conf.					Overall
Team	W		L		T	W		L		T
Chattanooga $	8	–	1	–	0	8	–	2	–	0
Mississippi College	6	–	1	–	2	7	–	1	–	2
Western Kentucky State Normal	5	–	1	–	0	8	–	1	–	0
Southern College	4	–	1	–	0	5	–	2	–	1
Transylvania	4	–	1	–	0	8	–	3	–	0
Wofford	5	–	2	–	0	7	–	2	–	1
Furman	3	–	1	–	0	5	–	4	–	0
Millsaps	4	–	2	–	1	5	–	3	–	1
Howard (AL)	4	–	2	–	1	6	–	4	–	1
Centenary	2	–	1	–	1	6	–	3	–	2
Louisiana College	2	–	1	–	0	3	–	5	–	0
The Citadel	4	–	3	–	0	6	–	3	–	1
Southwestern (TN)	2	–	2	–	0	6	–	4	–	0
Birmingham–Southern	2	–	2	–	3	3	–	2	–	4
Mercer	2	–	2	–	1	3	–	5	–	1
Georgetown (KY)	3	–	3	–	0	3	–	6	–	0
SW Louisiana	3	–	4	–	0	4	–	5	–	0
Kentucky Wesleyan	2	–	3	–	0	6	–	3	–	0
Stetson	2	–	3	–	0	4	–	3	–	0
Newberry	2	–	3	–	0	3	–	5	–	0
Spring Hill	2	–	3	–	1	2	–	5	–	1
Oglethorpe	1	–	2	–	0	3	–	5	–	1
Presbyterian	2	–	5	–	0	4	–	6	–	0
Louisiana Normal	1	–	3	–	0	5	–	4	–	0
Union (TN)	2	–	6	–	0	3	–	7	–	0
Centre	1	–	3	–	0	2	–	8	–	0
Louisiana Tech	1	–	6	–	0	2	–	7	–	0
Rollins	0	–	3	–	0	0	–	4	–	0
Louisville	0	–	4	–	0	1	–	7	–	0
Erskine	0	–	5	–	0	2	–	7	–	0
$ – Conference champion

The 1928 Southwestern Louisiana Bulldogs football team was an American football team that represented the Southwestern Louisiana Institute of Liberal and Technical Learning (now known as the University of Louisiana at Lafayette) in the Southern Intercollegiate Athletic Association during the 1928 college football season. In their tenth year under head coach T. R. Mobley, the team compiled a 4–5 record.

== Schedule ==
Date	Time	Opponent	Site	Result	Attendance	Source
September 29		at Centenary	Centenary Field; Shreveport, LA	L 0–46		
October 6		at LSU*	Tiger Stadium; Baton Rouge, LA	L 0–46		
October 13		Mississippi College	Campus Athletic Field; Lafayette, LA	L 0–19		
October 20		at Spring Hill	Hartwell Field; Mobile, AL	W 6–0		
October 26		Mississippi State Teachers*	Campus Athletic Field; Lafayette, LA	W 37–7		
November 3		at Louisiana Tech	Tech Field; Ruston, LA (rivalry)	W 45–6		
November 10		at Louisiana College	Alumni Field; Pineville, LA	L 6–14		
November 17		at Millsaps	Athletic Field; Jackson, MS	L 7–31		
November 29	2:30 p.m.	Louisiana Normal^{†}	Campus Athletic Field; Lafayette, LA	W 13–6	3,500	
*Non-conference game; ^{†}Homecoming; All times are in Central time
