= T. R. Mobley =

American coach and athletic director (1892–1964)

Biographical details
- Born: April 20, 1892
- Died: May 23, 1954 (aged 62); Pineville, Louisiana, U.S.

Playing career

Football
- 1913–1914: LSU
- Positions: Guard, center

Coaching career (HC unless noted)

Football
- 1916: Southwest Louisiana Industrial
- 1919: Southwest Louisiana Industrial
- 1921–1930: Southwest Louisiana

Basketball
- 1921–1925: Southwest Louisiana

Baseball
- 1922–1927: Southwest Louisiana

Administrative career (AD unless noted)
- 1926–1930: Southwest Louisiana

Head coaching record
- Overall: 56–48–7 (football)

Thomas Ray Mobley Sr. (April 20, 1892 – May 13, 1964) was an American college athletic coach and athletic director. He served in a number of head coaching roles at the University of Louisiana at Lafayette–then known as Southwest Louisiana Institute–including head football (1916, 1919, 1921–1930), basketball (1921–1925), and baseball (1922–1927).

Mobley played college football at Louisiana State University (LSU), lettering from 1913 to 1914. He served in the United States Army during World War II, attaining the rank of captain. He was an officer in the Reserve Corps of the Army in 1920.

Mobley was the department commander of the American Legion in Louisiana from 1931 to 1932. He died on May 13, 1964, at a hospital in Pineville, Louisiana.

== Head coaching record ==
Year	Team	Overall	Conference	Standing	Bowl/playoffs
Southwestern Louisiana Industrial (Independent) (1916)
1916	Southwestern Louisiana Industrial	7–1			
Southwestern Louisiana Industrial (Independent) (1919)
1919	Southwestern Louisiana Industrial	2–4–2			
Southwestern Louisiana (Louisiana Intercollegiate Athletic Association) (1921–1924)
1921	Southwestern Louisiana	8–2			
1922	Southwestern Louisiana	3–4–2	0–2		
1923	Southwestern Louisiana	7–3	2–1		
1924	Southwestern Louisiana	6–2–1	3–0		
Southwestern Louisiana (Southern Intercollegiate Athletic Association) (1925–1930)
1925	Southwestern Louisiana	7–2	3–0		
1926	Southwestern Louisiana	6–3–1	2–2		
1927	Southwestern Louisiana	2–7–1	1–4		
1928	Southwestern Louisiana	4–5	3–4		
1929	Southwestern Louisiana	2–7	1–5		
1930	Southwestern Louisiana	2–8	1–5		
Southwestern Louisiana Industrial / Southwestern Louisiana:		56–48–7	16–23		
Total:		56–48–7			
