= Tommy Scaffe =

American football player and coach (1896–1970)

Biographical details
- Born: April 19, 1896; Columbia, South Carolina, U.S.
- Died: September 26, 1970 (aged 74)

Playing career
- 1916–1918: Navy
- Position: Guard

Coaching career (HC unless noted)
- 1919–1923: Navy (line)
- 1925–1926: St. John's (MD)
- 1927–1933: Wofford

Administrative career (AD unless noted)
- 1927–1933: Wofford

Head coaching record
- Overall: 28–46–7

Accomplishments and honors

Awards
- Second-team All-American (1918)

Thomas Clarkson Scaffe (April 19, 1896 – September 26, 1970) was an American college football player and coach. He served as the head football coach at St. John's College in Annapolis, Maryland from 1925 to 1926 and Wofford College in Spartanburg, South Carolina from 1927 to 1933. He was buried in Arlington National Cemetery.

== Head coaching record ==
Year	Team	Overall	Conference	Standing	Bowl/playoffs
St. John's Johnnies (Independent) (1925–1926)
1925	St. John's	2–4–1			
1926	St. John's	2–4–1			
St. John's:		4–8–2			
Wofford Terriers (Southern Intercollegiate Athletic Association) (1927–1933)
1927	Wofford	2–4–3	2–1–2	8th	
1928	Wofford	7–2–1	5–2	5th	
1929	Wofford	3–6	2–3	T–19th	
1930	Wofford	2–9	1–3	T–22nd	
1931	Wofford	4–5	3–4	16th	
1932	Wofford	3–6–1	1–3–1	T–19th	
1933	Wofford	3–6	1–4	T–23rd	
Wofford:		24–38–5	15–20–3		
Total:		28–46–7			
