= Jesse Burbage =

American basketball player and coach

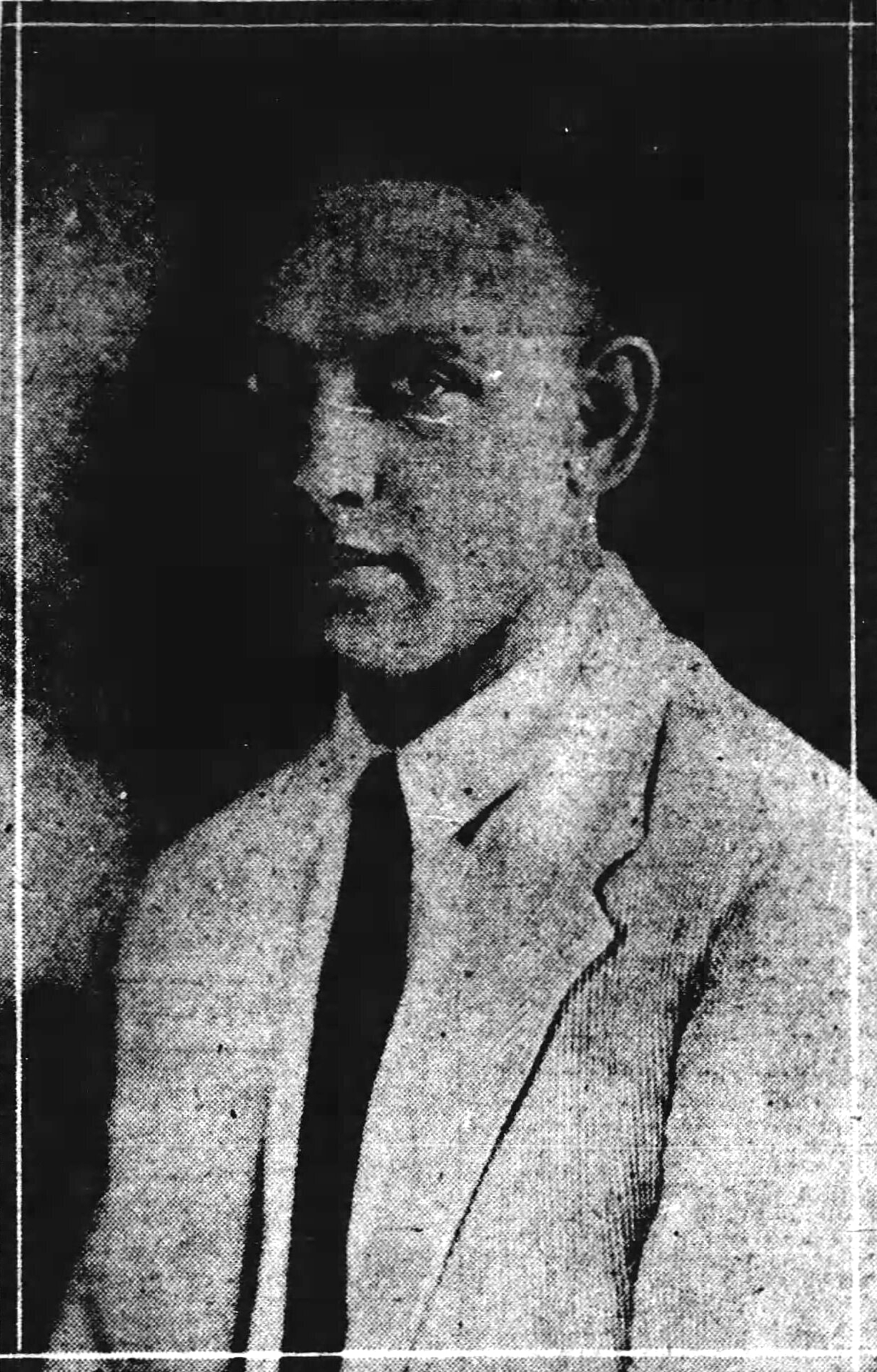
- Burbage circa 1925

Biographical details
- Born: February 22, 1894; Shelbyville, Kentucky, U.S.
- Died: December 5, 1957 (aged 63); Huntsville, Alabama, U.S.

Playing career

Basketball
- 1914–1918: Auburn
- Position: Guard

Coaching career (HC unless noted)

Basketball
- 1922–1924: Trinity (NC)
- 1927–1929: Southern College

Football
- 1927–1929: Southern College

Head coaching record
- Overall: 53–25 (basketball); 5–2–1 (football)

Jesse Samuel Burbage (February 22, 1894 – December 5, 1957) was an American basketball player and coach. He was a four-year starter at the guard position for the Auburn Tigers from 1914 to 1918. Burbage served as the head coach of the Trinity Blue and White (now the Duke Blue Devils) from 1922 to 1924.

Burbage later served as an Army colonel. Circa 1951, he became administrator of the City-County Hospital in Tuskegee, Alabama, where he would serve for six years until his death. He died on December 5, 1957, at Huntsville Hospital.

== Head coaching record ==
Record table
Season	Team	Overall	Conference	Standing	Postseason
Trinity Blue and White (Independent) (1922–1924)
1922–23	Trinity	15–7			
1923–24	Trinity	19–6			
Trinity:		34–13			
Southern College Moccasins (Independent) (1927–1929)
1927–28	Southern College	8–8			
1928–29	Southern College	11–4			
Southern College:		19–12			
Total:		53–25			

=== Football ===
Year	Team	Overall	Conference	Standing	Bowl/playoffs
Southern College Moccasins (Southern Intercollegiate Athletic Association) (1928)
1928	Southern College	5–2–1	4–1	4th	
Southern College:		5–2–1	4–1		
Total:		5–2–1			
