= 1924 Louisiana Tech Bulldogs football team =

American college football season

1924 Louisiana Tech Bulldogs football
- Conference: Louisiana Intercollegiate Athletic Association
- Record: 1–6–1 (0–1 LIAA)
- Head coach: Philip Arbuckle (1st season)
- Captain: Otis Reed
- Home stadium: Louisiana Tech Field

The 1924 Louisiana Tech Bulldogs football team was an American football team that represented the Louisiana Polytechnic Institute—now known as Louisiana Tech University—as a member of the Louisiana Intercollegiate Athletic Association (LIAA) during the 1924 college football season. Led by Philip Arbuckle in his first and only year as head coach, Louisiana Tech compiled an overall record of 1–6–1. The team's captain was Otis Reed.

== Schedule ==
Date	Time	Opponent	Site	Result	Source
October 4	2:30 p.m.	Louisiana College*	Louisiana Tech Field; Ruston, LA	T 0–0	
October 11		at Tulane*	Tulane Stadium; New Orleans, LA	L 12–42	
October 18		Dallas	Louisiana Tech Field; Ruston, LA	L 0–9	
October 24		Little Rock*	Ruston, LA	W 12–0	
November 1		at St. Edward's*	Austin, TX	L 12–28	
November 7		Ouachita Baptist*	Louisiana Tech Field; Ruston, LA	L 0–13	
November 15		at Southwestern Louisiana	Girard Field; Lafayette, LA (rivalry)	L 6–20	
November 29	2:30 p.m.	at Loyola (LA)*	New Orleans, LA	L 0–27	
*Non-conference game; All times are in Central time
