= 1921 Southwestern Louisiana Bulldogs football team =

American college football season

1921 Southwestern Louisiana Bulldogs football
- Conference: Louisiana Intercollegiate Athletic Association
- Record: 8–2 ( LIAA)
- Head coach: T. R. Mobley (3rd season)
- Home stadium: Girard Field

The 1921 Southwestern Louisiana Bulldogs football team was an American football team that represented the Southwestern Louisiana Institute of Liberal and Technical Learning (now known as the University of Louisiana at Lafayette) in the Louisiana Intercollegiate Athletic Association during the 1921 college football season. In their fourth year under head coach T. R. Mobley, the team compiled a 9–2 record.

== Schedule ==
Date	Opponent	Site	Result	Source
September 24	Patterson High School*	Girard Field; Lafayette, LA	W 26–0	
October 1	at Rice*	Rice Field; Houston, TX	L 0–54	
October 8	Jefferson College (LA)*	Girard Field; Lafayette, LA	W 35–0	
October 15	vs. LSU JV*	Fairgrounds; Lake Charles, LA	W 3–0	
October 22	at Tulane JV*	New Orleans, LA	W 13–7	
October 29	Louisiana College	Girard Field; Lafayette, LA	W 46–0	
November 4	at Loyola (LA)*	New Orleans, LA	W 20–0	
November 11	at Louisiana Tech	Tech Field; Ruston, LA	L 0–20	
November 24	Louisiana Normal	Girard Field; Lafayette, LA	W 33–0	
December 4	at St. Charles (LA)	Grand Coteau, LA	W 40–21	
*Non-conference game
