= 1922 Southwestern Louisiana Bulldogs football team =

American college football season

1922 Southwestern Louisiana Bulldogs football
- Conference: Louisiana Intercollegiate Athletic Association
- Record: 3–4–2 (0–2 LIAA)
- Head coach: T. R. Mobley (4th season)
- Home stadium: Girard Field

The 1922 Southwestern Louisiana Bulldogs football team was an American football team that represented the Southwestern Louisiana Institute of Liberal and Technical Learning (now known as the University of Louisiana at Lafayette) in the Louisiana Intercollegiate Athletic Association during the 1922 college football season. In their fourth year under head coach T. R. Mobley, the team compiled a 3–4–2 record.

== Schedule ==
Date	Opponent	Site	Result	Source
September 30	Patterson High School*	Girard Field; Lafayette, LA	W 12–0	
October 7	at Jefferson College (LA)*	Convent, LA	T 0–0	
October 14	Tulane JV*	Girard Field; Lafayette, LA	W 31–6	
October 21	Loyola (LA)*	Girard Field; Lafayette, LA	T 9–9	
October 28	at Louisiana College	Alumni Field; Pineville, LA	L 0–7	
November 4	at Saint Stanislaus*	Bay St. Louis, MS	W 14–0	
November 11	at LSU JV*	Tiger Stadium; Baton Rouge, LA	L 0–6	
November 18	Spring Hill*	Girard Field; Lafayette, LA	L 12–13	
November 30	at Louisiana Normal	Normal Athletic Park; Natchitoches, LA	L 6–13	
*Non-conference game
