= 1923 Southwestern Louisiana Bulldogs football team =

American college football season

1923 Southwestern Louisiana Bulldogs football
- Conference: Louisiana Intercollegiate Athletic Association
- Record: 7–3 (2–1 LIAA)
- Head coach: T. R. Mobley (5th season)
- Home stadium: Girard Field

The 1923 Southwestern Louisiana Bulldogs football team was an American football team that represented the Southwestern Louisiana Institute of Liberal and Technical Learning (now known as the University of Louisiana at Lafayette) in the Louisiana Intercollegiate Athletic Association during the 1923 college football season. In their fifth year under head coach T. R. Mobley, the team compiled a 7–3 record.

== Schedule ==
Date	Opponent	Site	Result	Attendance	Source
September 22	Centenary	Girard Field; Lafayette, LA	L 0–35		
September 29	at Tulane*	Tulane Stadium; New Orleans, LA	L 2–20		
October 6	at LSU*	State Field; Baton Rouge, LA	L 3–7	3,000	
October 13	Jefferson College (LA)*	Girard Field; Lafayette, LA	W 81–0		
October 20	Louisiana College	Girard Field; Lafayette, LA	W 31–10		
October 27	at South Park Junior College*	Beaumont, TX	W 19–16		
November 3	at Spring Hill*	Maxon Field; Mobile, AL	W 40–7		
November 10	Saint Stanislaus*	Girard Field; Lafayette, LA	W 14–0		
November 17	Mississippi Normal*	Girard Field; Lafayette, LA	W 66–0		
November 29	Louisiana Normal	Girard Field; Lafayette, LA	W 14–12		
*Non-conference game
