= 1919 Southwestern Louisiana Industrial football team =

American college football season

1919 Southwestern Louisiana Industrial football
- Conference: Louisiana Intercollegiate Athletic Association
- Record: 2–4–2 (2–1–1 LIAA)
- Head coach: T. R. Mobley (2nd season)
- Home stadium: Girard Field

The 1919 Southwestern Louisiana Industrial football team was an American football team that represented the Southwestern Louisiana Industrial Institute (now known as the University of Louisiana at Lafayette) as a member of the Louisiana Intercollegiate Athletic Association (LIAA) during the 1919 college football season. In their second year under head coach T. R. Mobley, the team compiled a 2–4–2 record.

== Schedule ==
Date	Opponent	Site	Result	Source
September 27	Alumni Team*	Girard Field; Lafayette, LA	T 7–7	
October 4	at LSU*	State Field; Baton Rouge, LA	L 0–33	
October 11	at Tulane*	Tulane Stadium; New Orleans, LA	L 0–73	
October 18	Louisiana College	Girard Field; Lafayette, LA	T 0–0	
November 1	LSU JV*	Girard Field; Lafayette, LA	L 0–18	
November 8	vs. Centenary	Lake Charles, LA	L 0–6	
November 15	St. Charles College (LA)	Girard Field; Lafayette, LA	W 44–3	
November 27	Louisiana Normal	Girard Field; Lafayette, LA	W 13–0	
*Non-conference game
