= 1924 Southwestern Louisiana Bulldogs football team =

American college football season

1924 Southwestern Louisiana Bulldogs football

LIAA champion
- Conference: Louisiana Intercollegiate Athletic Association
- Record: 6–2–1 (3–0 LIAA)
- Head coach: T. R. Mobley (6th season)
- Home stadium: Girard Field

The 1924 Southwestern Louisiana Bulldogs football team was an American football team that represented the Southwestern Louisiana Institute of Liberal and Technical Learning (now known as the University of Louisiana at Lafayette) in the Louisiana Intercollegiate Athletic Association during the 1924 college football season. In their sixth year under head coach T. R. Mobley, the team compiled a 6–2–1 record.

== Schedule ==
Date	Opponent	Site	Result	Source
September 27	at Tulane*	Tulane Stadium; New Orleans, LA	L 0–14	
October 4	at LSU*	Tiger Stadium; Baton Rouge, LA	L 7–31	
October 11	Jefferson College (LA)*	Girard Field; Lafayette, LA	W 66–0	
October 18	Sam Houston State*	Girard Field; Lafayette, LA	W 28–7	
October 25	at Louisiana College	Alumni Field; Pineville, LA	W 32–7	
November 1	NAS Pensacola*	Girard Field; Lafayette, LA	T 21–21	
November 8	South Park Junior College*	Girard Field; Lafayette, LA	W 20–8	
November 15	Louisiana Tech	Girard Field; Lafayette, LA (rivalry)	W 20–6	
November 27	at Louisiana Normal	Normal Athletic Park; Natchitoches, LA	W 20–0	
*Non-conference game
