= The Citadel–Wofford football rivalry =

American college football rivalry

The Citadel–Wofford rivalry
- The Citadel Wofford
- Sport: Football
- First meeting: November 4, 1916; The Citadel, 37–0
- Latest meeting: August 29, 2026; Wofford, 42–14
- Trophy: Big Dog Trophy (since 2017)

Statistics
- Total meetings: 80
- All-time series: The Citadel, 45–34–1
- Trophy series: Wofford, 7–3
- Largest victory: The Citadel, 41–0 (1936)
- Longest win streak: Wofford, 16 (1999–2014)
- Longest unbeaten streak: Wofford, 16 (1999–2014)
- Current win streak: Wofford, 2 (2025–present)

Locations of The Citadel and Wofford

The Citadel–Wofford football rivalry is an American college football rivalry game played by The Citadel Bulldogs football team of The Citadel, The Military College of South Carolina and the Wofford Terriers football team of Wofford College. The Citadel is located in Charleston, South Carolina, while Wofford is located in Spartanburg, South Carolina. The schools were two of the last colleges in the United States to integrate women into their respective student bodies, with Wofford admitting women in 1976 and The Citadel in 1996. The two schools are also both highly ranked academically by reviewers such as U.S. News & World Report.

When played in Spartanburg, the matchup is referred to as the Beacon Iced Tea Bowl, after the owners of the Beacon Iced Tea Company, with one co-owner each who graduated from The Citadel and Wofford.

== History ==
The series dates to 1916, when the Bulldogs defeated the Terriers 37–0 in Charleston. Wofford won the second matchup, in Spartanburg in 1919, by a score of 12–0. The Citadel has dominated the rivalry historically, posting winning streaks of 15 games and 13 games, though Wofford maintained a 16-game win streak from 1999 through 2014. These win streaks, combined with closely fought games in recent years, have led to the growth of the rivalry between the two schools.

The Terriers and Bulldogs have met in three neutral sites, Augusta, Georgia, Wilmington, North Carolina, and Orangeburg, South Carolina as part of the Orangeburg Country Fair in the 1950s. Wofford won 5 of 8 matchups in Orangeburg, while the Bulldogs claimed the games in Augusta and Wilmington. From 1967 until 1998, one year after the Terriers joined the Southern Conference, the teams met in Charleston exclusively, with The Citadel winning 19 of 22 matchups.

== Game results ==
The Citadel victories	Wofford victories	Tie games

No.	Date	Location	Winner	Score
1	November 4, 1916	Charleston, SC	The Citadel	37–0
2	October 18, 1919	Spartanburg, SC	Wofford	12–0
3	October 23, 1920	Charleston, SC	The Citadel	19–0
4	October 8, 1921	Charleston, SC	The Citadel	28–0
5	November 24, 1923	Spartanburg, SC	The Citadel	9–0
6	October 4, 1924	Charleston, SC	The Citadel	19–0
7	October 23, 1926	Spartanburg, SC	The Citadel	6–0
8	November 12, 1927	Charleston, SC	Tie	6–6
9	November 24, 1928	Spartanburg, SC	Wofford	9–7
10	November 28, 1929	Spartanburg, SC	The Citadel	7–0
11	November 29, 1930	Spartanburg, SC	The Citadel	7–6
12	November 26, 1931	Charleston, SC	The Citadel	28–7
13	November 24, 1932	Spartanburg, SC	The Citadel	13–0
14	November 30, 1933	Charleston, SC	The Citadel	14–0
15	November 3, 1934	Spartanburg, SC	The Citadel	18–7
16	October 12, 1935	Charleston, SC	The Citadel	20–7
17	November 26, 1936	Augusta, GA	The Citadel	41–0
18	September 18, 1937	Spartanburg, SC	The Citadel	38–0
19	October 29, 1938	Charleston, SC	The Citadel	27–0
20	December 2, 1939	Wilmington, NC	The Citadel	21–2
21	November 1, 1940	Orangeburg, SC	The Citadel	7–2
22	November 8, 1941	Charleston, SC	The Citadel	42–7
23	October 28, 1949	Orangeburg, SC	Wofford	21–7
24	October 29, 1954	Orangeburg, SC	The Citadel	14–13
25	October 29, 1955	Orangeburg, SC	Wofford	27–7
26	October 19, 1956	Orangeburg, SC	Wofford	23–19
27	October 11, 1957	Orangeburg, SC	Wofford	34–0
28	October 10, 1958	Orangeburg, SC	Wofford	18–6
29	October 9, 1959	Orangeburg, SC	The Citadel	40–8
30	September 23, 1967	Charleston, SC	The Citadel	17–7
31	September 27, 1975	Charleston, SC	The Citadel	16–7
32	September 3, 1977	Charleston, SC	The Citadel	7–0
33	November 11, 1978	Charleston, SC	The Citadel	35–17
34	October 27, 1979	Charleston, SC	The Citadel	49–30
35	November 1, 1980	Charleston, SC	The Citadel	35–3
36	November 14, 1981	Charleston, SC	The Citadel	24–14
37	September 25, 1982	Charleston, SC	The Citadel	21–14
38	November 10, 1984	Charleston, SC	The Citadel	23–16
39	November 9, 1985	Charleston, SC	The Citadel	42–28
40	November 8, 1986	Charleston, SC	The Citadel	20–6
41	September 5, 1987	Charleston, SC	The Citadel	38–0

No.	Date	Location	Winner	Score
42	September 9, 1989	Charleston, SC	The Citadel	42–21
43	November 10, 1990	Charleston, SC	The Citadel	48–14
44	September 14, 1991	Charleston, SC	Wofford	15–12
45	September 12, 1992	Charleston, SC	The Citadel	30–13
46	September 4, 1993	Charleston, SC	Wofford	20–6
47	September 10, 1994	Charleston, SC	The Citadel	31–3
48	September 9, 1995	Charleston, SC	The Citadel	27–10
49	November 23, 1996	Charleston, SC	Wofford	26–21
50	November 1, 1997	Charleston, SC	The Citadel	7–3
51	September 12, 1998	Spartanburg, SC	The Citadel	20–14
52	October 30, 1999	Charleston, SC	Wofford	47–16
53	October 28, 2000	Spartanburg, SC	Wofford	31–10
54	October 27, 2001	Charleston, SC	Wofford	13–0
55	November 2, 2002	Spartanburg, SC	Wofford	27–14
56	November 1, 2003	Charleston, SC	Wofford	42–16
57	October 30, 2004	Spartanburg, SC	Wofford	38–17
58	October 29, 2005	Charleston, SC	Wofford	28–10
59	October 7, 2006	Spartanburg, SC	Wofford	28–20
60	October 6, 2007	Charleston, SC	Wofford	28–7
61	November 8, 2008	Spartanburg, SC	Wofford	33–28
62	November 7, 2009	Charleston, SC	Wofford	43–17
63	October 30, 2010	Spartanburg, SC	Wofford	35–0
64	October 8, 2011	Charleston, SC	Wofford	43–14
65	October 27, 2012	Spartanburg, SC	Wofford	24–21
66	September 7, 2013	Charleston, SC	Wofford	21–10
67	October 4, 2014	Spartanburg, SC	Wofford	17–13
68	October 10, 2015	Charleston, SC	The Citadel	39–12
69	October 22, 2016	Spartanburg, SC	The Citadel	24–21^{OT}
70	December 3, 2016 †	Charleston, SC	Wofford	17–3
71	October 14, 2017	Charleston, SC	Wofford	20–16
72	September 1, 2018	Spartanburg, SC	Wofford	28–21
73	November 21, 2019	Charleston, SC	Wofford	31–11
74	April 3, 2021	Spartanburg, SC	The Citadel	28–24
75	November 13, 2021	Charleston, SC	The Citadel	45–44^{OT}
76	October 15, 2022	Spartanburg, SC	Wofford	31–16
77	November 11, 2023	Charleston, SC	Wofford	11–3
78	November 16, 2024	Spartanburg, SC	The Citadel	30–17
79	November 15, 2025	Charleston, SC	Wofford	16–14
80	August 29, 2026	Spartanburg, SC	Wofford	42–14
Series: The Citadel leads 45–34–1
† = FCS playoff game

== Other varsity sports ==
Sport	Last Matchup					All-Time Series	
Sport	Date	Location	Winner	Score	Attendance	Leader	Record
Baseball	April 10, 2026	Russell C. King Field • Spartanburg, SC	Wofford	2–0	637	Wofford	81–55
Baseball	April 11, 2026	Russell C. King Field • Spartanburg, SC	Wofford	6–5	874	Wofford	81–55
Baseball	April 12, 2026	Russell C. King Field • Spartanburg, SC	Wofford	5–3	473	Wofford	81–55
Baseball	May 20, 2026	Fluor Field • Greenville, SC	The Citadel	13–7	526	Wofford	81–55
Basketball (M)	January 3, 2026	McAlister Field House • Charleston, SC	Wofford	95–86	1,323	Wofford	72–51
Basketball (M)	February 28, 2026	Jerry Richardson Indoor Stadium • Spartanburg, SC	The Citadel	93–90	1,356	Wofford	72–51
Soccer (W)	October 28, 2025	Snyder Field • Spartanburg, SC	Wofford	2–1	156	Wofford	19–5–4
Volleyball (W)	September 25, 2025	McAlister Field House • Charleston, SC	Wofford	3–0	711	Wofford	48–12
Volleyball (W)	October 25, 2025	Jerry Richardson Indoor Stadium • Spartanburg, SC	Wofford	3–0	174	Wofford	48–12

== See also ==
- List of NCAA college football rivalry games
