= Corcoran Field =

Soccer stadium in Cincinnati, Ohio, US

Coordinates: 39°08′55″N 84°28′42″W

Corcoran Field is a 1,600-seat soccer stadium located on the campus of Xavier University in Cincinnati, Ohio. It is part of the Xavier University Soccer Complex. It is home to the Xavier University men's and women's soccer teams, who compete in the Big East Conference. The Xavier football team played at XU Soccer Complex until 1972.

The facility underwent renovations in 2011, which included the installation of FieldTurf. The field is also used to play lacrosse by the Xavier lacrosse team.
