= Kentucky Wesleyan Panthers football =

College football team for Kentucky Wesleyan College

- First season: 1907; 119 years ago (Note: The team played from 1907 to 1930, then was disbanded. It was relaunched in 1983; 43 years ago.)
- Head coach: Tyrone Young; 3rd season, 8–24 (.250)
- Location: Owensboro, Kentucky
- Stadium: Steele Stadium
- Field: Independence Bank Field
- Conference: Great Midwest Athletic Conference
- Division: Division II
- Colors: Purple and White
- Mascot: Panther
- Website: kwcpanthers.com/football

The Kentucky Wesleyan Panthers football program represents Kentucky Wesleyan College in college football as a member of the Great Midwest Athletic Conference at the NCAA Division II level. The college's football program began in 1907, lasting until 1930, when it was discontinued due to financial reasons. In 1982, the decision was made to re-establish a football program at the school, with the school resuming football operations the following year. Initially, the Panthers were an NCAA Division III team, unaffiliated with any conference, and also played only a season in the NAIA. They moved into Division II beginning with the 1994 football season.

== History ==
=== 1907–1930 ===
Not much information is available regarding the Panthers teams of the early 20th century. The team played teams such as Kentucky, Marshall, and Xavier. According to the scant material available through Fanbase.com, they did not have much success during this period. Eventually, due to financial reasons, the football program was discontinued after the 1930 season.

=== Division III ===
==== 1983–1988 ====
When the football program was re-established at Kentucky Wesleyan in 1983, the school played at the Division III level as an independent school, unaffiliated with any conference. That first season, they finished with a 3–5 record, and they followed that with another five straight losing seasons. The Panthers' first coach after the re-establishment of the program was Billy Mitchell, who compiled a record of 22–41–3 during his seven seasons.

==== 1990–1993 ====
Mitchell was succeeded by Randy Awrey, who had been the defensive coordinator for four years at another Division III school, St. Lawrence University. He posted three losing seasons, before posting the school's first winning season in 1993 at 6–4. In their first winning season in 1993, the team set records for passing completion percentage (55.7%) and defensive pass interceptions (21). On the defensive side that year, Troy Crissman led all NCAA Division III defenders with 9 interceptions.

=== NAIA ===
==== 1989 ====
The Panthers played in the NAIA's Mid-South Conference, posting a 1–4–1 record in their only season for that conference, finishing second from bottom before returning to the NCAA.

=== Division II ===
==== 1994–2002 ====
In 1994 the Panthers moved to NCAA Division II level football and hired John Johnson, a former assistant coach with the Green Bay Packers. In his nine years as head coach, from 1994 to 2002, Johnson's overall record was 34–58. Those 34 wins are still the most by any Kentucky Wesleyan football coach. While he had a losing record during his tenure, the Panthers played NCAA Division I-AA teams 26 times, losing all 26 games. Johnson had two winning seasons as KWC's head football coach, 6–4 in 1997 and 7–4 in 1999. The 1999 KWC football team set the record with the most wins in a season with (7), finishing with a 7–4 record. The 1999 team started the season 5–0 (tying a school record) and rose to #1 in the NCAA Division II Non-Scholarship Poll by Don Hansen's National Weekly Football Gazette on October 17, 1999, finishing the season ranked #2. Don Hansen's Football Gazette named John Johnson the 1999 NCAA Division II Non-Scholarship National Coach of the Year and Linebacker Nick Boling (1997–2001) was named the 1999 NCAA Division II Non-Scholarship Linebacker of the Year.

The 2000 team finished 4–6, but finished 10th in NCAA Division II Football for total offense (434.4 yards per game). Wide receiver Corey Jordan (1997–2001) was named the 2000 NCAA Division II Non-Scholarship National Receiver of the Year by Don Hansen's National Weekly Football Gazette. The 2001 and 2002 teams finished with a combined record of 2–19, but WR Corey Jordan, LB Vince Brodt, and LB Frank Wintrich, were named NCAA Division II Mid-Major 1st Team All-Americans by Don Hansen's National Weekly Football Gazette for 2001. Following the 2002 season, offensive lineman Jake Colson (1998–2002) was selected as an NCAA Division II Mid-Major 1st Team All-American by Don Hansen's National Weekly Football Gazette. Following consecutive one-win seasons, John Johnson's tenure at Kentucky Wesleyan ended January 1, 2003.

==== 2003–present ====
Current head coach, Brent Holsclaw, a former Kentucky Wesleyan quarterback, was hired in January 2002. Through the 2013 football season, Holsclaw's overall record at Kentucky Wesleyan is 24–94. In Holsclaw's first season as KWC's head football coach, Holsclaw's 2003 Panthers finished 1–9. Unaffiliated to this point, the Panthers joined the NAIA's Mid-South Conference in 2004 and remained in the conference for 2005. In 2006 the Panthers returned to NCAA Division II, becoming a charter member of the Great Lakes Football Conference. The 2006 Panthers finished 0–11; the eleven losses were the most in school history. The 2013 team under Holsclaw, in his 11th season, equaled their worst season in 2006 by going 0–11.

== Facilities ==
From 1983 to 2003 the Kentucky Wesleyan Football team played their home games at Owensboro area high schools. In 2004, the Panthers began playing their home football games at Bullet Wilson Field, an on-campus field completed prior to the 2004 football season. The playing surface at Independence Bank Field features FieldTurf, an artificial playing surface. The stadium around the field underwent a major upgrade project following the 2006 season. When the upgrade was completed the home of the Panthers football team was to be known as Steele Stadium.

== Alumni in the pros ==
Three former Kentucky Wesleyan football players have played in the Arena Football League (AFL). Wide receiver Anthony Payton (1994–1996) played four seasons in the AFL for New Jersey Red Dogs (2000 and 2001), Buffalo Destroyers (2003), and Las Vegas Gladiators (2005). Defensive lineman Karl Bates (1997–1999) played seven seasons in the AFL for the Houston Thunderbears (2000 and 2001) and in Denmark from 2006 to 2009, New Jersey Gladiators (2002), Las Vegas Gladiators (2003), Detroit Fury (2004), Las Vegas Gladiators (2005), and San Jose SaberCats (2006). Wide receiver Sedrick Robinson (1993–1996) played nine years in the AFL for the Houston Thunderbears (2001), New Jersey Gladiators (2002), Las Vegas Gladiators (2003), Columbus Destroyers (2004 and 2005), Austin Wranglers (2006 and 2007), and Tampa Bay Storm (2008 and 2010).

David Cunningham (American football) played in Europe from 1988 to 1993 in the BAFA National Leagues, the Spanish league Liga Nacional de Fútbol Americano and National Ligaen in Denmark. Xavier Mitchell (2012–2014) had a good career playing from 2015 to 2021 in the Italian Football League, Austrian Football League and German Football League in Europe. Also playing overseas were Karl Bates from 2006 to 2009, Chris Tracy in 1998, and Scott Dykes in 1994.

Wide receiver Keelan Cole played in the National Football League (NFL) from 2017 to 2024.

== Individual records ==
{{KWC Record Book }}

- Most rushing yards (career): 1,853 – Jeremy Sleet (1994–1997)
- Most rushing yards (season): 839 – Letiz Arnold (2005)
- Most rushing touchdowns (career): 23 – Bobby Ratcliff (1991–1994)
- Most rushing touchdowns (season): 12 – Drew Hall (1999–2000) – 2000
- Most rushing attempts (career): 363 – Jeremy Sleet (1994–1997)
- Most rushing attempts (season): 149 – Letiz Arnold (2005)
- Most passing yards (career): 7,440 – J.D. Meyers (1996–1999)
- Most passing yards (per game): 256.5 – Brian Hoffmann (2000)
- Most passing yards (season): 2,565 – Brian Hoffmann (2000)
- Most passing touchdowns (career): 64 – J.D. Meyers (1996–1999)
- Most pass attempts (career): 1,033 – J.D. Meyers (1996–1999)
- Most pass completions (career): 519 – J.D. Meyers (1996–1999)
- Most pass completions (season): 207 – Brent Holsclaw (1991–1993) – 1993
- Passing percentage (career): 54.1% – Brian Hoffmann (2000)
- Passing percentage (season): 55.8% – Brent Holsclaw (1991–1993) – 1993
- Receiving yards (career): 3,328 – Sedrick Robinson (1993–1996)
- Receiving yards (season): 1,105 – Sedrick Robinson (1993–1996 – 1995
- Receptions (career): 191 – Sedrick Robinson (1993–1996)
- Receptions (season): 68 – Sedrick Robinson (1993–1996) – 1995
- Receiving touchdowns (career): 42 – Sedrick Robinson (1993–1996)
- Receiving touchdowns (season): 17 – Sedrick Robinson (1993–1996) – 1995
- Touchdowns scored (career): 46 – Sedrick Robinson (1993–1996)
- All purpose yards (career): 5,601 – Sedrick Robinson (1993–1996)
- Kick return yards (career): 1,772 – Sedrick Robinson (1993–1996)
- Total points (career): 298 – Sedrick Robinson (1993–1996)
- Total points (season): 116 – Sedrick Robinson (1993–1996) – 1995
- Interceptions (career): 21 – Ryan Davis (1991–1994)
- Tackles (career): 347 – Brian Sieder (1994–1997)
- Sacks (career): 31.5 – Alex Temple (2004–2007)
- Punt yards (career): 7,401 – Steve Wolf (1983–1987)
- Punt attempts (career): 193 – Steve Wolf (1983–1987)
- Average yards per punt (career): 38.35 – Steve Wolf (1983–1987)
- Average yards per punt (season): 40.4 – Steve Wolf – 1983

== Team records ==
- Tackles (season): 632.5 – 2004
- Pass completions (season): 234 – 2000
- Passing yards (season): 3,035 – 2000
- Passing touchdowns (season): 27 – 2000
- Pass receptions (season): 234 – 2000
- Total offense (season): 4,521 – 1994
- Touchdowns (season): 73 – 1994
- Points scored (season): 333 – 1994
- Punt attempts (season): 81 – 1990
- Rushing yards (season): 2,186 – 1986
- Rushing attempts (season): 510 – 1989
- Rushing touchdowns (season): 22 – 1989
