= Rhodes Lynx football =

College football program of Rhodes University

- First season: 1896; 130 years ago
- Athletic director: Jim Duncan
- Head coach: Matt Ellis (interim); 1st season, 2–0 (1.000)
- Location: Memphis, Tennessee
- Stadium: Crain Field (capacity: 4,000)
- NCAA division: Division III
- Conference: SAA
- Colors: Cardinal and Black

Conference championships
- 11
- Fight song: Lynx March
- Mascot: Lynx
- Rivals: Sewanee Tigers
- Website: Official website

The Rhodes Lynx football team represents Rhodes College in Memphis, Tennessee. The Lynx participate at the NCAA Division III level and are members of the Southern Athletic Association (SAA). The team is coached by Matt Ellis, who took over for Rich Duncan after his resignation in 2026.

== Notable alumni ==
- Henry Hammond '36 – Chicago Bears end, 1937
- Tom Mullady '79 – New York Giants tight end, 1979 to 1984
- Joshua Coker '19 – Houston Texans offensive line, 2019; Calgary Stampeders offensive line, 2020 to 2025; BC Lions offensive line, 2026 to present
