= List of Northwestern State Demons football seasons =

This is a list of seasons completed by the Northwestern State Demons football team of the National Collegiate Athletic Association (NCAA) Division I Football Championship Subdivision (FCS). Northwestern State's first football team was fielded in 1907.

Northwestern State originally competed as a football independent, before going on to compete in the Louisiana Intercollegiate Athletic Association, Southern Intercollegiate Athletic Association, Louisiana Intercollegiate Conference, Gulf States Conference, Gulf South Conference, and Gulf Star Conference. Since 1987, Northwestern State has been a member of the I-AA's Southland Conference.

== Seasons ==
Statistics correct as of the end of the 2025 NCAA Division I FCS football season

| NCAA Division I champions | NCAA Division I FCS champions | Conference champions | Division champions | Bowl eligible | Undefeated season |

| Year | NCAA division | Conference | Conference division | Overall | | | | | Conference | | | | | | Coach | Final ranking |
| Year | NCAA division | Conference | Conference division | Games | Win | Loss | Tie | Pct. | Games | Win | Loss | Tie | Pct. | Standing | Coach | Final ranking |
|---|---|---|---|---|---|---|---|---|---|---|---|---|---|---|---|---|
| 1907 | N/A | Independent | N/A | 1 | 0 | 1 | 0 | .000 | 0 | 0 | 0 | 0 | .000 | N/A | John Coolidge | - |
| 1908 | N/A | Independent | N/A | 4 | 1 | 2 | 1 | .375 | 0 | 0 | 0 | 0 | .000 | N/A | John Coolidge | - |
| 1909 | N/A | Independent | N/A | 5 | 4 | 1 | 0 | .800 | 0 | 0 | 0 | 0 | .000 | N/A | J. H. Griffith | - |
| 1910 | N/A | Independent | N/A | 7 | 6 | 1 | 0 | .857 | 0 | 0 | 0 | 0 | .000 | N/A | C. G. Pool | - |
| 1911 | N/A | Independent | N/A | 7 | 2 | 5 | 0 | .286 | 0 | 0 | 0 | 0 | .000 | N/A | C. G. Pool | - |
| 1912 | N/A | Independent | N/A | 6 | 4 | 1 | 1 | .750 | 0 | 0 | 0 | 0 | .000 | N/A | C. G. Pool | - |
| 1913 | N/A | Independent | N/A | 5 | 3 | 2 | 0 | .600 | 0 | 0 | 0 | 0 | .000 | N/A | H. Lee Prather | - |
| 1914 | N/A | Independent | N/A | 6 | 4 | 1 | 1 | .750 | 0 | 0 | 0 | 0 | .000 | N/A | H. Lee Prather | - |
| 1915 | N/A | Louisiana Intercollegiate Athletic Association | N/A | 6 | 4 | 2 | 0 | .667 | 5 | 3 | 2 | 0 | .600 | N/A | H. Lee Prather | - |
| 1916 | N/A | Louisiana Intercollegiate Athletic Association | N/A | 5 | 2 | 3 | 0 | .400 | 4 | 1 | 3 | 0 | .250 | N/A | H. Lee Prather | - |
| 1917 | N/A | Louisiana Intercollegiate Athletic Association | N/A | 4 | 3 | 1 | 0 | .750 | 2 | 1 | 1 | 0 | .500 | N/A | H. Lee Prather | - |
| 1918 | No team Due To World War I | | | | | | | | | | | | | | | |
| 1919 | N/A | Louisiana Intercollegiate Athletic Association | N/A | 7 | 5 | 2 | 0 | .714 | 5 | 3 | 2 | 0 | .600 | N/A | H. Lee Prather | - |
| 1920 | N/A | Louisiana Intercollegiate Athletic Association | N/A | 7 | 5 | 1 | 1 | .786 | 5 | 4 | 0 | 1 | .900 | N/A | H. Lee Prather | - |
| 1921 | N/A | Louisiana Intercollegiate Athletic Association | N/A | 7 | 3 | 3 | 1 | .500 | 5 | 2 | 2 | 1 | .500 | N/A | H. Lee Prather | - |
| 1922 | N/A | Louisiana Intercollegiate Athletic Association | N/A | 7 | 4 | 2 | 1 | .643 | 4 | 2 | 1 | 1 | .625 | N/A | H. Lee Prather | - |
| 1923 | N/A | Louisiana Intercollegiate Athletic Association | N/A | 9 | 3 | 6 | 0 | .333 | 4 | 0 | 4 | 0 | .000 | N/A | H. Lee Prather | - |
| 1924 | N/A | Louisiana Intercollegiate Athletic Association | N/A | 7 | 4 | 2 | 1 | .643 | 2 | 0 | 1 | 1 | .250 | N/A | H. Lee Prather | - |
| 1925 | N/A | Louisiana Intercollegiate Athletic Association | N/A | 9 | 5 | 3 | 1 | .611 | 0 | 0 | 0 | 0 | .000 | N/A | H. Lee Prather | - |
| 1926 | N/A | Independent | N/A | 9 | 3 | 5 | 1 | .389 | 0 | 0 | 0 | 0 | .000 | N/A | H. Lee Prather | - |
| 1927 | N/A | Independent | N/A | 7 | 2 | 3 | 2 | .429 | 0 | 0 | 0 | 0 | .000 | N/A | H. Lee Prather | - |
| 1928 | N/A | SIAA | N/A | 9 | 5 | 4 | 0 | .556 | 4 | 1 | 3 | 0 | .250 | N/A | H. Lee Prather | - |
| 1929 | N/A | SIAA | N/A | 9 | 4 | 3 | 2 | .556 | 3 | 1 | 0 | 2 | .667 | N/A | H. Lee Prather | - |
| 1930 | N/A | SIAA | N/A | 9 | 7 | 2 | 0 | .778 | 5 | 4 | 1 | 0 | .800 | N/A | H. Lee Prather | - |
| 1931 | N/A | SIAA | N/A | 9 | 5 | 4 | 0 | .556 | 6 | 2 | 4 | 0 | .333 | N/A | H. Lee Prather | - |
| 1932 | N/A | SIAA | N/A | 8 | 7 | 1 | 0 | .875 | 5 | 4 | 1 | 0 | .800 | N/A | H. Lee Prather | - |
| 1933 | N/A | SIAA | N/A | 9 | 5 | 3 | 1 | .611 | 5 | 2 | 3 | 0 | .400 | N/A | H. Lee Prather | - |
| 1934 | N/A | SIAA | N/A | 8 | 4 | 3 | 1 | .563 | 5 | 3 | 2 | 0 | .600 | N/A | Harry Turpin | - |
| 1935 | N/A | SIAA | N/A | 11 | 2 | 9 | 0 | .182 | 6 | 1 | 5 | 0 | .167 | N/A | Harry Turpin | - |
| 1936 | N/A | SIAA | N/A | 10 | 5 | 4 | 1 | .550 | 6 | 3 | 2 | 1 | .583 | N/A | Harry Turpin | - |
| 1937 | N/A | SIAA | N/A | 9 | 4 | 4 | 1 | .500 | 5 | 3 | 1 | 1 | .700 | N/A | Harry Turpin | - |
| 1938 | N/A | SIAA | N/A | 10 | 5 | 5 | 0 | .500 | 6 | 3 | 3 | 0 | .500 | N/A | Harry Turpin | - |
| 1939 | N/A | SIAA | N/A | 11 | 11 | 0 | 0 | 1.000 | 0 | 0 | 0 | 0 | .000 | N/A | Harry Turpin | - |
| 1940 | N/A | SIAA | N/A | 10 | 6 | 3 | 1 | .650 | 6 | 4 | 1 | 1 | .750 | N/A | Harry Turpin | - |
| 1941 | N/A | SIAA | N/A | 8 | 4 | 3 | 1 | .563 | 7 | 3 | 3 | 1 | .500 | N/A | Harry Turpin | - |
| 1942 | N/A | Louisiana Intercollegiate Conference | N/A | 8 | 6 | 2 | 0 | .750 | 3 | 3 | 0 | 0 | 1.000 | N/A | Harry Turpin | - |
| 1943 | No team Due To World War II | | | | | | | | | | | | | | | |
| 1944 | N/A | Louisiana Intercollegiate Conference | N/A | 7 | 2 | 4 | 1 | .357 | 4 | 0 | 3 | 1 | .125 | N/A | Harry Turpin | - |
| 1945 | N/A | Louisiana Intercollegiate Conference | N/A | 9 | 2 | 6 | 1 | .278 | 4 | 1 | 2 | 1 | .375 | N/A | Harry Turpin | - |
| 1946 | N/A | Louisiana Intercollegiate Conference | N/A | 10 | 4 | 6 | 0 | .400 | 4 | 1 | 3 | 0 | .250 | N/A | Harry Turpin | - |
| 1947 | N/A | Louisiana Intercollegiate Conference | N/A | 9 | 4 | 5 | 0 | .444 | 5 | 3 | 2 | 0 | .600 | N/A | Harry Turpin | - |
| 1948 | N/A | Gulf States | N/A | 9 | 5 | 3 | 1 | .611 | 5 | 2 | 3 | 0 | .400 | N/A | Harry Turpin | - |
| 1949 | N/A | Gulf States | N/A | 9 | 5 | 4 | 0 | .556 | 5 | 1 | 4 | 0 | .200 | N/A | Harry Turpin | - |
| 1950 | N/A | Gulf States | N/A | 10 | 6 | 4 | 0 | .600 | 5 | 2 | 3 | 0 | .400 | N/A | Harry Turpin | - |
| 1951 | N/A | Gulf States | N/A | 9 | 1 | 8 | 0 | .111 | 5 | 0 | 5 | 0 | .000 | N/A | Harry Turpin | - |
| 1952 | N/A | Gulf States | N/A | 9 | 1 | 7 | 1 | .167 | 5 | 0 | 4 | 1 | .100 | N/A | Harry Turpin | - |
| 1953 | N/A | Gulf States | N/A | 8 | 6 | 2 | 0 | .750 | 6 | 5 | 1 | 0 | .833 | N/A | Harry Turpin | - |
| 1954 | N/A | Gulf States | N/A | 9 | 7 | 2 | 0 | .778 | 6 | 4 | 2 | 0 | .667 | N/A | Harry Turpin | - |
| 1955 | N/A | Gulf States | N/A | 9 | 4 | 5 | 0 | .444 | 6 | 2 | 4 | 0 | .333 | N/A | Harry Turpin | - |
| 1956 | N/A | Gulf States | N/A | 10 | 6 | 2 | 2 | .700 | 5 | 3 | 1 | 1 | .700 | N/A | Harry Turpin | - |
| 1957 | N/A | Gulf States | N/A | 9 | 7 | 2 | 0 | .778 | 5 | 4 | 1 | 0 | .800 | N/A | Jack Clayton | - |
| 1958 | N/A | Gulf States | N/A | 10 | 8 | 2 | 0 | .800 | 5 | 4 | 1 | 0 | .800 | N/A | Jack Clayton | - |
| 1959 | N/A | Gulf States | N/A | 10 | 4 | 5 | 1 | .450 | 5 | 2 | 3 | 0 | .400 | N/A | Jack Clayton | - |
| 1960 | N/A | Gulf States | N/A | 9 | 3 | 6 | 0 | .333 | 5 | 0 | 5 | 0 | .000 | N/A | Jack Clayton | - |
| 1961 | N/A | Gulf States | N/A | 10 | 7 | 3 | 0 | .700 | 5 | 3 | 2 | 0 | .600 | N/A | Jack Clayton | - |
| 1962 | N/A | Gulf States | N/A | 10 | 7 | 2 | 1 | .750 | 5 | 4 | 1 | 0 | .800 | N/A | Jack Clayton | - |
| 1963 | N/A | Gulf States | N/A | 10 | 4 | 6 | 0 | .400 | 5 | 2 | 3 | 0 | .400 | N/A | Jack Clayton | - |
| 1964 | N/A | Gulf States | N/A | 9 | 4 | 5 | 0 | .444 | 5 | 1 | 4 | 0 | .200 | N/A | Jack Clayton | - |
| 1965 | N/A | Gulf States | N/A | 9 | 5 | 4 | 0 | .556 | 5 | 2 | 3 | 0 | .400 | N/A | Jack Clayton | - |
| 1966 | N/A | Gulf States | N/A | 9 | 9 | 0 | 0 | 1.000 | 5 | 5 | 0 | 0 | 1.000 | N/A | Jack Clayton | - |
| 1967 | N/A | Gulf States | N/A | 9 | 6 | 3 | 0 | .667 | 5 | 3 | 2 | 0 | .600 | N/A | Glenn Gossett | - |
| 1968 | N/A | Gulf States | N/A | 9 | 5 | 4 | 0 | .556 | 5 | 2 | 3 | 0 | .400 | N/A | Glenn Gossett | - |
| 1969 | N/A | Gulf States | N/A | 9 | 7 | 2 | 0 | .778 | 5 | 4 | 1 | 0 | .800 | N/A | Glenn Gossett | - |
| 1970 | N/A | Gulf States | N/A | 10 | 7 | 3 | 0 | .700 | 5 | 3 | 2 | 0 | .600 | N/A | Glenn Gossett | - |
| 1971 | N/A | Independent | N/A | 9 | 6 | 2 | 1 | .722 | 0 | 0 | 0 | 0 | .000 | N/A | Glenn Gossett | - |
| 1972 | II | Gulf South | N/A | 10 | 8 | 2 | 0 | .800 | 6 | 6 | 0 | 0 | 1.000 | N/A | George Doherty | - |
| 1973 | II | Gulf South | N/A | 11 | 6 | 5 | 0 | .545 | 7 | 3 | 4 | 0 | .429 | N/A | George Doherty | - |
| 1974 | II | Gulf South | N/A | 11 | 1 | 10 | 0 | .091 | 7 | 1 | 6 | 0 | .143 | N/A | George Doherty | - |
| 1975 | II | Division II Independent | N/A | 11 | 1 | 10 | 0 | .091 | 0 | 0 | 0 | 0 | .000 | N/A | A. L. Williams | - |
| 1976 | I | Independent | N/A | 10 | 5 | 5 | 0 | .500 | 0 | 0 | 0 | 0 | .000 | N/A | A. L. Williams | - |
| 1977 | I | Independent | N/A | 11 | 6 | 5 | 0 | .545 | 0 | 0 | 0 | 0 | .000 | N/A | A. L. Williams | - |
| 1978 | I-AA | Division I-AA Independent | N/A | 11 | 5 | 6 | 0 | .455 | 0 | 0 | 0 | 0 | .000 | N/A | A. L. Williams | - |
| 1979 | I-AA | Division I-AA Independent | N/A | 9 | 3 | 6 | 0 | .333 | 0 | 0 | 0 | 0 | .000 | N/A | A. L. Williams | - |
| 1980 | I-AA | Division I-AA Independent | N/A | 11 | 8 | 3 | 0 | .727 | 0 | 0 | 0 | 0 | .000 | N/A | A. L. Williams | - |
| 1981 | I-AA | Division I-AA Independent | N/A | 10 | 4 | 6 | 0 | .400 | 0 | 0 | 0 | 0 | .000 | N/A | A. L. Williams | - |
| 1982 | I-AA | Division I-AA Independent | N/A | 11 | 6 | 5 | 0 | .545 | 0 | 0 | 0 | 0 | .000 | N/A | A. L. Williams | - |
| 1983 | I-AA | Division I-AA Independent | N/A | 11 | 4 | 7 | 0 | .364 | 0 | 0 | 0 | 0 | .000 | N/A | Sam Goodwin | - |
| 1984 | I-AA | Gulf Star | N/A | 11 | 7 | 4 | 0 | .636 | 5 | 4 | 1 | 0 | .800 | N/A | Sam Goodwin | - |
| 1985 | I-AA | Gulf Star | N/A | 11 | 3 | 8 | 0 | .273 | 5 | 2 | 3 | 0 | .400 | N/A | Sam Goodwin | - |
| 1986 | I-AA | Gulf Star | N/A | 11 | 5 | 5 | 1 | .500 | 4 | 2 | 2 | 0 | .500 | N/A | Sam Goodwin | - |
| 1987 | I-AA | Southland | N/A | 11 | 6 | 5 | 0 | .545 | 6 | 3 | 3 | 0 | .500 | N/A | Sam Goodwin | - |
| 1988 | I-AA | Southland | N/A | 13 | 10 | 3 | 0 | .769 | 6 | 6 | 0 | 0 | 1.000 | N/A | Sam Goodwin | - |
| 1989 | I-AA | Southland | N/A | 11 | 4 | 5 | 2 | .455 | 6 | 3 | 1 | 2 | .667 | N/A | Sam Goodwin | - |
| 1990 | I-AA | Southland | N/A | 11 | 5 | 6 | 0 | .455 | 6 | 3 | 3 | 0 | .500 | N/A | Sam Goodwin | - |
| 1991 | I-AA | Southland | N/A | 11 | 6 | 5 | 0 | .545 | 6 | 3 | 3 | 0 | .500 | N/A | Sam Goodwin | - |
| 1992 | I-AA | Southland | N/A | 11 | 7 | 4 | 0 | .636 | 7 | 3 | 4 | 0 | .429 | N/A | Sam Goodwin | - |
| 1993 | I-AA | Southland | N/A | 11 | 5 | 6 | 0 | .455 | 7 | 3 | 4 | 0 | .429 | N/A | Sam Goodwin | - |
| 1994 | I-AA | Southland | N/A | 11 | 5 | 6 | 0 | .455 | 6 | 3 | 3 | 0 | .500 | N/A | Sam Goodwin | - |
| 1995 | I-AA | Southland | N/A | 11 | 6 | 5 | 0 | .545 | 6 | 3 | 3 | 0 | .500 | N/A | Sam Goodwin | - |
| 1996 | I-AA | Southland | N/A | 11 | 6 | 5 | 0 | .545 | 6 | 3 | 3 | 0 | .500 | N/A | Sam Goodwin | - |
| 1997 | I-AA | Southland | N/A | 12 | 8 | 4 | 0 | .667 | 7 | 6 | 1 | 0 | .857 | N/A | Sam Goodwin | - |
| 1998 | I-AA | Southland | N/A | 14 | 11 | 3 | 0 | .786 | 7 | 6 | 1 | 0 | .857 | N/A | Sam Goodwin | - |
| 1999 | I-AA | Southland | N/A | 11 | 4 | 7 | 0 | .364 | 7 | 3 | 4 | 0 | .429 | N/A | Sam Goodwin | - |
| 2000 | I-AA | Southland | N/A | 11 | 6 | 5 | 0 | .545 | 7 | 3 | 4 | 0 | .429 | N/A | Steve Roberts | - |
| 2001 | I-AA | Southland | N/A | 12 | 8 | 4 | 0 | .667 | 6 | 4 | 2 | 0 | .667 | N/A | Steve Roberts | - |
| 2002 | I-AA | Southland | N/A | 13 | 9 | 4 | 0 | .692 | 6 | 4 | 2 | 0 | .667 | N/A | Scott Stoker | - |
| 2003 | I-AA | Southland | N/A | 12 | 6 | 6 | 0 | .500 | 5 | 1 | 4 | 0 | .200 | N/A | Scott Stoker | - |
| 2004 | I-AA | Southland | N/A | 12 | 8 | 4 | 0 | .667 | 5 | 4 | 1 | 0 | .800 | N/A | Scott Stoker | - |
| 2005 | I-AA | Southland | N/A | 10 | 5 | 5 | 0 | .500 | 6 | 3 | 3 | 0 | .500 | N/A | Scott Stoker | - |
| 2006 | FCS | Southland | N/A | 11 | 4 | 7 | 0 | .364 | 6 | 2 | 4 | 0 | .333 | N/A | Scott Stoker | - |
| 2007 | FCS | Southland | N/A | 11 | 4 | 7 | 0 | .364 | 7 | 3 | 4 | 0 | .429 | N/A | Scott Stoker | - |
| 2008 | FCS | Southland | N/A | 12 | 7 | 5 | 0 | .583 | 7 | 4 | 3 | 0 | .571 | N/A | Scott Stoker | - |
| 2009 | FCS | Southland | N/A | 11 | 0 | 11 | 0 | .000 | 7 | 0 | 7 | 0 | .000 | 8th | Bradley Dale Peveto | - |
| 2010 | FCS | Southland | N/A | 11 | 5 | 6 | 0 | .455 | 7 | 4 | 3 | 0 | .571 | T-3rd | Bradley Dale Peveto | - |
| 2011 | FCS | Southland | N/A | 11 | 5 | 6 | 0 | .455 | 7 | 3 | 4 | 0 | .429 | 5th | Bradley Dale Peveto | - |
| 2012 | FCS | Southland | N/A | 11 | 4 | 7 | 0 | .364 | 7 | 2 | 5 | 0 | .286 | 6th | Bradley Dale Peveto | - |
| 2013 | FCS | Southland | N/A | 12 | 6 | 6 | 0 | .500 | 7 | 3 | 4 | 0 | .429 | 5th | Jay Thomas | - |
| 2014 | FCS | Southland | N/A | 12 | 6 | 6 | 0 | .500 | 8 | 4 | 4 | 0 | .500 | T-6th | Jay Thomas | - |
| 2015 | FCS | Southland | N/A | 11 | 4 | 7 | 0 | .364 | 9 | 4 | 5 | 0 | .444 | T-5th | Jay Thomas | - |
| 2016 | FCS | Southland | N/A | 11 | 1 | 10 | 0 | .091 | 9 | 0 | 9 | 0 | .000 | 11th | Jay Thomas | - |
| 2017 | FCS | Southland | N/A | 11 | 4 | 7 | 0 | .364 | 9 | 4 | 5 | 0 | .444 | T-6th | Jay Thomas | - |
| 2018 | FCS | Southland | N/A | 11 | 5 | 6 | 0 | .455 | 9 | 4 | 5 | 0 | .444 | T-8th | Brad Laird | - |
| 2019 | FCS | Southland | N/A | 12 | 3 | 9 | 0 | .250 | 9 | 3 | 6 | 0 | .333 | T-8th | Brad Laird | - |
| 2020 | FCS | Southland | N/A | 6 | 1 | 5 | 0 | .167 | 6 | 1 | 5 | 0 | .167 | 7th | Brad Laird | - |
| 2021 | FCS | Southland | N/A | 11 | 3 | 8 | 0 | .273 | 8 | 3 | 5 | 0 | .375 | T-4th | Brad Laird | - |
| 2022 | FCS | Southland | N/A | 11 | 4 | 7 | 0 | .364 | 6 | 4 | 2 | 0 | .667 | 3rd | Brad Laird | - |
| 2023 | FCS | Southland | N/A | 6 | 0 | 6 | 0 | .000 | 2 | 0 | 2 | 0 | .000 | 8th | Brad Laird | - |
| 2024 | FCS | Southland | N/A | 12 | 0 | 12 | 0 | .000 | 7 | 0 | 7 | 0 | .000 | 8th | Blaine McCorkle | - |
| 2025 | FCS | Southland | N/A | 12 | 1 | 11 | 0 | .083 | 8 | 0 | 8 | 0 | .000 | 8th | Blaine McCorkle | - |
| | Totals | | | 1,114 | 550 | 529 | 35 | .509 | | | | | | | | |
