= List of Northwestern State Demons head football coaches =

List of head football coaches for the Northwestern State Demons

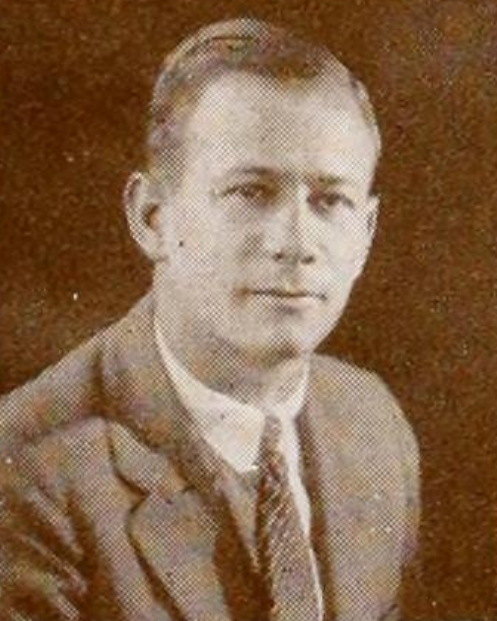
Harry Turpin led the Demons for the most total games during his tenure from 1934 to 1956.

The Northwestern State Demons college football team represents Northwestern State University (Note: Northwestern State University previously competed as Louisiana State Normal School from 1907 to 1944.) as a member of the Southland Conference (SLC). The Demons compete as part of the NCAA Division I Football Championship Subdivision. The program has had 16 head coaches, since it began play during the 1907 season. Since November 2023, Blaine McCorkle has served as head coach at Northwestern State.

Three coaches have led Northwestern State to the postseason: Sam Goodwin, Steve Roberts, and Scott Stoker. Six of those coaches also won conference championships: H. Lee Prather captured one as a member of the Louisiana Intercollegiate Athletic Association; Harry Turpin captured two as a member of the Louisiana Intercollegiate Conference and one as a member of the Southern Intercollegiate Athletic Association; Jack Clayton captured four as a member of the Gulf States Conference; George Doherty captured one as a member of the Gulf South Conference; Sam Goodwin captured one as a member of the Gulf Star Conference;, and Goodwin captured three and Scott Stoker one as a member of the SLC.

Prather is the leader in seasons coached with 20, Turpin is tke leader in games coached (202), and Goodwin is the leader in games won (102). J. H. Griffith has the highest winning percentage at 0.800. McCorkle has the lowest winning percentage of those who have coached more than one game, with 0.042.

== Key ==
Key to symbols in coaches list
General		Overall		Conference		Postseason (Note: Although the first Rose Bowl Game was played in 1902, it has been continuously played since the 1916 game, and is recognized as the oldest bowl game by the NCAA. "—" indicates any season prior to 1916 when postseason games were not played.)	
No.	Order of coaches (Note: A running total of the number of head coaches, with coaches who served separate tenures being counted only once. Interim head coaches are represented with "Int" and are not counted in the running total. "—" indicates the team played but either without a coach or no coach is on record. "X" indicates an interim year without play.)	GC	Games coached	CW	Conference wins	PW	Postseason wins
DC	Division championships	OW	Overall wins	CL	Conference losses	PL	Postseason losses
CC	Conference championships	OL	Overall losses	CT	Conference ties	PT	Postseason ties
NC	National championships	OT	Overall ties (Note: Overtime rules in college football were introduced in 1996, making ties impossible in the period since.)	C%	Conference winning percentage		
†	Elected to the College Football Hall of Fame	O%	Overall winning percentage (Note: When computing the win–loss percentage, a tie counts as half a win and half a loss.)				

== Coaches ==
List of head football coaches showing season(s) coached, overall records, conference records, postseason records, championships and selected awards (Note: Statistics correct as of the end of the 2025 NCAA Division I FCS football season.)
No.	Name	Season(s) (Note: Northwestern State did not field teams in 1918 and 1943 seasons.)	GC	OW	OL	OT	O%	CW	CL	CT	C%	PW	PL	PT	CC	NC	Awards
1	John W. Coolidge	1907–1908	5	1	3	1	0.300	—	—	—	—	—	—	—	—	0	—
2	J. H. Griffith	1909	5	4	1	0	0.800	—	—	—	—	—	—	—	—	0	—
3	Clarence G. Pool	1910–1912	20	12	7	1	0.625	—	—	—	—	—	—	—	—	0	—
4	H. Lee Prather	1913–1933	148	83	53	12	0.601	30	28	6	0.516	—	—	—	1	0	—
5	Harry Turpin	1934–1956	202	100	91	11	0.522	55	54	8	0.504	—	—	—	4	0	—
6	Jack Clayton	1957–1966	95	58	35	2	0.621	27	23	0	0.540	—	—	—	4	0	—
7	Glenn Gossett	1967–1971	46	31	14	1	0.685	12	8	0	0.600	—	—	—	0	0	—
8	George Doherty	1972–1974	32	15	17	0	0.469	10	10	0	0.500	—	—	—	1	0	—
9	A. L. Williams	1975–1982	84	38	46	0	0.452	—	—	—	—	—	—	—	—	0	—
10	Sam Goodwin	1983–1999	193	102	88	3	0.536	57	38	2	0.598	3	3	0	4	0	—
11	Steve Roberts	2000–2001	23	12	11	—	0.522	5	8	—	0.385	0	1	—	0	0	—
12	Scott Stoker	2002–2008	81	44	37	—	0.543	22	20	—	0.524	0	2	—	1	0	—
13	Bradley Dale Peveto	2009–2012	44	14	30	—	0.318	9	19	—	0.321	0	0	—	0	0	—
14	Jay Thomas	2013–2017	57	21	36	—	0.368	15	27	—	0.357	0	0	—	0	0	—
15	Brad Laird	2018–2023	57	16	41	—	0.281	15	25	—	0.375	0	0	—	0	0	—
16	Blaine McCorkle	2024–present	24	1	23	—	0.042	0	15	—	.000	0	0	—	0	0	—
