= 2018 Northwestern State Demons football team =

American college football season

2018 Northwestern State Demons football
- Conference: Southland Conference
- Record: 5–6 (4–5 Southland)
- Head coach: Brad Laird (1st season)
- Offensive coordinator: Brad Smiley (1st season)
- Offensive scheme: Spread
- Defensive coordinator: Mike Lucas (2nd season)
- Base defense: 3–4
- Home stadium: Harry Turpin Stadium

2018 Southland Conference football standings
| | Conf. | | | Overall |
| Team | W | | L | W | | L |
|---|---|---|---|---|---|---|
| No. 14 Nicholls +^ | 7 | – | 2 | 9 | – | 4 |
| Incarnate Word +^ | 6 | – | 2 | 6 | – | 5 |
| Lamar ^ | 6 | – | 3 | 7 | – | 5 |
| Abilene Christian | 5 | – | 4 | 6 | – | 5 |
| Central Arkansas | 5 | – | 4 | 6 | – | 5 |
| McNeese State | 5 | – | 4 | 6 | – | 5 |
| Sam Houston State | 5 | – | 4 | 6 | – | 5 |
| Northwestern State | 4 | – | 5 | 5 | – | 6 |
| Southeastern Louisiana | 4 | – | 5 | 4 | – | 7 |
| Stephen F. Austin | 2 | – | 7 | 2 | – | 8 |
| Houston Baptist | 0 | – | 9 | 1 | – | 10 |
+ – Conference co-champions; ^ – FCS playoff participant; Rankings from STATS poll

The 2018 Northwestern State Demons football team represented Northwestern State University as a member of the Southland Conference during the 2018 NCAA Division I FCS football season. Led by first-year head coach Brad Laird, the Demons compiled an overall record of 5–6 with a mark of 4–5 in conference play, tying for eighth place in the Southland. Northwestern State played home games at Harry Turpin Stadium in Natchitoches, Louisiana.

== Preseason ==
=== Preseason poll ===
On July 19, 2018, the Southland announced their preseason poll, with the Demons predicted to finish in eighth place.

== Schedule ==
| Date | Time | Opponent | Site | TV | Result | Attendance |
|---|---|---|---|---|---|---|
| August 30 | 7:30 p.m. | at Texas A&M* | Kyle Field; College Station, TX (SEC Nation) | SECN | L 7–59 | 95,855 |
| September 8 | 6:00 p.m. | Grambling State* | Harry Turpin Stadium; Natchitoches, LA | DemonTV | W 34–7 | 13,525 |
| September 15 | 6:00 p.m. | at Lamar | Provost Umphrey Stadium; Beaumont, TX | ESPN+ | W 49–48 | 6,021 |
| September 29 | 7:00 p.m. | at Southeastern Louisiana | Strawberry Stadium; Hammond, LA (rivalry) | CST/ESPN3 | L 17–24 | 5,118 |
| October 6 | 6:00 p.m. | No. 12 Nicholls | Harry Turpin Stadium; Natchitoches, LA (NSU Challenge) | CST | L 10–28 | 7,055 |
| October 13 | 6:00 p.m. | No. 15 Sam Houston State | Harry Turpin Stadium; Natchitoches, LA | CST/ESPN+ | L 28–42 | 5,125 |
| October 20 | 6:00 p.m. | at No. 15 Central Arkansas | Estes Stadium; Conway, AR | Bear Nation Network | L 17–38 | 6,754 |
| October 27 | 6:00 p.m. | Houston Baptist^{†} | Harry Turpin Stadium; Natchitoches, LA | DemonTV | W 31–28 | 7,098 |
| November 3 | 2:00 p.m. | at Abilene Christian | Wildcat Stadium; Abilene, TX | ACU Stretch | L 47–49 | 6,936 |
| November 10 | 6:00 p.m. | No. 18 McNeese State | Harry Turpin Stadium; Natchitoches, LA (rivalry) | ESPN3 | W 37–34 | 6,111 |
| November 15 | 6:00 p.m. | at Stephen F. Austin | Homer Bryce Stadium; Nacogdoches, TX (Battle for Chief Caddo) | ELVN/SLC Digital | W 35–23 | 2,611 |
*Non-conference game; ^{†}Homecoming; Rankings from STATS Poll released prior to the game; All times are in Central time

== Game summaries ==
=== At Texas A&M ===
Northwestern State at Texas A&M – Game summary

| Quarter | 1 | 2 | 3 | 4 | Total |
|---|---|---|---|---|---|
| Demons | 0 | 0 | 0 | 7 | 7 |
| Aggies | 7 | 28 | 17 | 7 | 59 |

at Kyle Field, College Station, TX

- Date: August 30
- Game time: 7:30 p.m. CST
- Game weather: Temperature: 93 °F (34 °C) • Weather: partly cloudy • Wind: E/SE 6 MPH
- Game attendance: 95,855
- Referee: Ken Williamson
- TV announcers (SEC Network): Tom Hart (play-by-play), Jordan Rodgers (analyst), Cole Cubelic (sidelines)

Game information

First quarter

- TAMU - Trayveon Williams 73-yard TD run, Daniel LaCamera kick good, 11:41 (TAMU 7-0)

Second quarter

- TAMU - Jace Sternberger 7-yard TD pass from Kellen Mond, LaCamera kick good, 14:56 (TAMU 14-0)
- TAMU - Williams 2-yard TD run, LaCamera kick good, 8:11 (TAMU 21-0)
- TAMU - Mond 1-yard TD run, LaCamera kick good, 4:16 (TAMU 28-0)
- TAMU - Sternberger 8-yard TD pass from Mond, LaCamera kick good, 0:06 (TAMU 35-0)

Third quarter

- TAMU - Williams 40-yard TD run, LaCamera kick good, 12:20 (TAMU 42-0)
- TAMU - Kwame Etwi 4-yard TD run, LaCamera kick good, 9:23 (TAMU 49-0)
- TAMU - LaCamera 52-yard field goal, 3:24 (TAMU 52-0)

Fourth quarter

- NSU - Jazz Ferguson 71-yard TD pass from Clay Holgorsen, Austyn Fendrick kick good, 14:39 (TAMU 52-7)
- TAMU - Jalen Preston 14-yard D pass from Nick Starkel, LaCamera kick good, 8:00 (TAMU 59-7)

Top passers

- TAMU - Kellen Mond - 17/25, 184 yards, 2 TD
- NSU - Clay Holgorsen - 9/19, 125 yards, TD

Top rushers

- TAMU - Trayveon Williams - 20 carries, 240 yards, TD
- NSU - Clay Holgorsen - 2 carries, 7 yards

Top receivers

- TAMU - Jhamon Ausbon - 6 receptions, 81 yards
- NSU - Jazz Ferguson - 4 receptions, 129 yards, TD

=== Grambling State ===
Grambling State at Northwestern State – Game summary

| Quarter | 1 | 2 | 3 | 4 | Total |
|---|---|---|---|---|---|
| Tigers | 0 | 7 | 0 | 0 | 7 |
| Demons | 21 | 6 | 0 | 7 | 34 |

at Harry Turpin Stadium, Natchitoches, LA

- Date: September 8
- Game time: 6:00 p.m. CST
- Game weather: 77 °F (25 °C); overcast
- Game attendance: 13,525
- Referee: Eddie Kelley

Game information

First quarter

- NSU - Jaylen Watson 20-yard TD pass from Shelton Eppler, Austyn Fendrick kick good, 12:33 (NSU 7-0)
- NSU - Jazz Ferguson 13-yard TD pass from Eppler, Fendrick kick good, 6:57 (NSU 14-0)
- NSU - Da'Von Smith 12-yard TD pass from Eppler, Fendrick kick good, 4:59 (NSU 21-0)

Second quarter

- GRAM - Kevin Dominique 6-yard TD run, Garrett Urban kick good, 14:45 (NSU 21-7)
- NSU - Levar Gumms 10-yard TD pass from Eppler, Fendrick kick good, 1:48 (NSU 28-7)

Fourth quarter

- NSU - Jared West 3-yard TD run, Fendrick kick good, 13:42 (NSU 34-7)

Top passers

- NSU - Shelton Eppler - 24/31, 263 yards, 4 TD
- GRAM - Aldon Clark - 14/22, 125 yards, 2 INT

Top rushers

- NSU - Jared West - 15 carries, 87 yards, TD
- GRAM - Aldon Clark - 14 carries, 67 yards

Top receivers

- NSU - Quan Shorts - 6 receptions, 78 yards
- GRAM - Raylon Richardson - reception, 38 yards

=== At Lamar ===
Northwestern State at Lamar – Game summary

| Quarter | 1 | 2 | 3 | 4 | Total |
|---|---|---|---|---|---|
| Demons | 14 | 14 | 7 | 14 | 49 |
| Cardinals | 0 | 14 | 14 | 20 | 48 |

at Provost Umphrey Stadium, Beaumont, TX

- Date: September 15
- Game time: 6:00 p.m. CST
- Game weather: 87 °F (31 °C); scattered thunderstorm; SSW 5 mph
- Game attendance: 6,021
- Referee: Dan Lewis
- TV announcers (ESPN+): Butch Alsandor (play-by-play) and Lemont Williams (analyst)

Game information

First quarter

- NSU - Jared West 1-yard TD run, Austyn Fendrick kick good, 10:58 (NSU 7-0)
- NSU - Quan Shorts 17-yard TD pass from Shelton Eppler, Fendrick kick good, 2:56 (NSU 14-0)

Second quarter

- NSU - Levar Gumms 22-yard TD pass from Eppler, Fendrick kick good, 10:21 (NSU 21-0)
- NSU - Marquisian Chapman 38-yard TD pass from Eppler, Fendrick kick good, 6:01 (NSU 28-0)
- LAM - Darrel Colbert Jr. 3-yard TD run, Elvin Martinez kick good, 4:04 (NSU 28-7)
- LAM - Dorian Gaston 25-yard TD pass from Darrel Colbert Jr., Martinez kick good, 1:39 (NSU 28-14)

Third quarter

- LAM - Jawun Ruffin 45-yard TD pass from Colbert Jr., Martinez kick good, 9:10 (NSU 28-21)
- LAM - Gaston 43-yard TD pass from Colbert Jr., Martinez kick good, 6:01 (TIE 28-28)
- NSU - Watson 11-yard TD pass from Eppler, Fendrick kick good, 3:43 (NSU 35-28)

Fourth quarter

- LAM - Colbert Jr., 3-yard TD run, Martinez kick good, 13:03 (TIE 35-35)
- NSU - Jazz Ferguson 70-yard TD pas from Eppler, Fendrick kick good, 12:54 (NSU 42-35)
- NSU - Ferguson 9-yard TD pass from Eppler, Fendrick kick good, 9:30 (NSU 49-35)
- LAM - Colbert Jr. 8-yard TD run, Martinez kick good, 5:01 (NSU 49-42)
- LAM - Gaston 37-yard TD pass from Colbert Jr., Martinez kick no good, 2:38 (NSU 49-48)

Top passers

- NSU - Shelton Eppler - 27/48, 474 yards, 6 TD
- LAM - Darrel Colbert Jr. - 15/31, 263 yards, 4 TD, INT

Top rushers

- NSU - Jared West - 12 carries, 60 yards, TD
- LAM - Darrel Colbert Jr. - 27 carries, 137 yards, 3 TD

Top receivers

- NSU - Jazz Ferguson - 4 receptions, 142 yards, 2 TD
- LAM - Dorian Gaston - 4 receptions, 114 yards, 3 TD

=== At Southeastern Louisiana ===
Northwestern State at Southeastern Louisiana – Game summary

| Quarter | 1 | 2 | 3 | 4 | Total |
|---|---|---|---|---|---|
| Demons | 3 | 0 | 0 | 14 | 17 |
| Lions | 7 | 14 | 3 | 0 | 24 |

at Strawberry Stadium, Hammond, LA

- Date: September 29
- Game time: 7:00 p.m. CST
- Game weather: 80 °F (27 °C); cloudy
- Game attendance: 5,118
- Referee: C. Watson
- TV: CST/ESPN3

Game information

First quarter

- SELA - Austin Mitchell 76-yard TD pass from Chason Virgil, Jonathan Tatum kick good, 14:25 (SELA 7-0)
- NSU - Austyn Fendrick 36-yard field goal, 8:54 (SELA 7-3)

Second quarter

- SELA - CJ Turner 8-yard TD pass from Virgil, Tatum kick good, 13:05 (SELA 14-3)
- SELA - Lorenzo Nunez 1-yard TD run, Tatum kick good, 2:29 (SELA 21-3)

Third quarter

- SELA - Tatum 24-yard field goal, 10:53 (SELA 24-3)

Fourth quarter

- NSU - Jaylen Watson 11-yard TD pass from Shelton Eppler, Fendrick kick good, 11:18 (SELA 24-10)
- NSU - Blake Stephenson 0-yard fumble return for TD, Fendrick kick good, 5:34 (SELA 24-17)

Top passers

- SELA - Chason Virgil - 19/28, 316 yards, 2 TD, INT
- NSU - Shelton Eppler - 25/40, 268 yards, TD

Top rushers

- SELA - Darren Johnson - 7 carries, 22 yards
- NSU - Jared West - 22 carries, 137 yards

Top receivers

- SELA - Austin Mitchell - 5 receptions, 182 yards, TD
- NSU - Jazz Ferguson - 6 receptions, 117 yards

=== Nicholls ===
Nicholls at Northwestern State – Game summary

| Quarter | 1 | 2 | 3 | 4 | Total |
|---|---|---|---|---|---|
| No. 10 Colonels | 0 | 14 | 7 | 7 | 28 |
| Demons | 3 | 7 | 0 | 0 | 10 |

at Harry Turpin Stadium, Natchitoches, LA

- Date: October 6
- Game time: 6:00 p.m. CST
- Game weather: 77 °F (25 °C); cloudy
- Game attendance: 7,055
- Referee: David Alvarez
- TV: CST

Game information

First quarter

- NSU - Austyn Fendrick 28-yard field goal, 13:39 (NSU 3-0)

Second quarter

- NICH - Dai'Jean Dixon 5-yard TD pass from Chase Fourcade, Lorran Fonseca kick good, 14:16 (NICH 7-3)
- NSU - Stadford Anderson 12-yard TD run, Fendrick kick good, 10:28 (NSU 10-7)
- NICH - Fourcade 3-yard TD run, Fonseca kick good, 5:01 (NICH 14-10)

Third quarter

- NICH - Kendall Bussey 1-yard TD run, Fonseca kick good, 12:35 (NICH 21-10)

Fourth quarter

- NICH - Julien Gums 2-yard TD run, Fonseca kick good, 1:42 (NICH 28-10)

Top passers

- NICH - Chase Fourcade - 8/17, 118 yards, TD, INT
- NSU - Shelton Eppler - 16/27, 218 yards, 2 INT

Top rushers

- NICH - Dontrell Taylor - 11 carries, 103 yards
- NSU - Jared West - 14 carries, 57 yards

Top receivers

- NICH - Damion Jeanpiere Jr. - 2 receptions, 60 yards
- NSU - Jaylen Watson - 4 receptions, 72 yards

=== Sam Houston State ===
Sam Houston State at Northwestern State – Game summary

| Quarter | 1 | 2 | 3 | 4 | Total |
|---|---|---|---|---|---|
| No. 14 Bearkats | 14 | 9 | 11 | 8 | 42 |
| Demons | 0 | 28 | 0 | 0 | 28 |

at Harry Turpin Stadium, Natchitoches, LA

- Date: October 13
- Game time: 6:00 p.m. CST
- Game weather: 80 °F (27 °C); partly cloudy
- Game attendance: 5,125
- Referee: Kevin Boitmann
- TV: CST/ESPN3

Game information

First quarter

- SHSU - Davion Davis 21-yard TD pass from Ty Brock, Tre Honshtein kick good, 9:52 (SHSU 7-0)
- SHSU - Davis 2-yard TD pass from Brock, Honshtein kick good, 4:19 (SHSU 14-0)

Second quarter

- NSU - Jazz Ferguson 28-yard TD pass from Shelton Eppler, Austyn Fendrick kick good, 14:51 (SHSU 14-7)
- NSU - Quan Shorts 44-yard TD pass from Eppler, Fendrick kick good, 7:16 (TIE 14-14)
- NSU - Ferguson 20-yard TD pass from Eppler, Fendrick kick good, 6:37 (NSU 21-14)
- SHSU - Davis 11-yard TD pass from Brock, Honshtein kick good, 2:46 (TIE 21-21)
- SHSU - Team safety, 1:22 (SHSU 23-21)
- NSU - Hayden Bourgeois 55-yard interception returned for TD, Fendrick kick good, 0:27 (NSU 28-23)

Third quarter

- SHSU - Kyran Jackson 28-yard TD run, Brock two-point conversion pass to Davis good, 6:16 (SHSU 31-28)
- SHSU - Honshtein 46-yard field goal, 0:36 (SHSU 34-28)

Fourth quarter

- SHSU - Davis 2-yard TD pass from Brock, Brock two-point conversion pass to Woody Brandom good, 13:07 (SHSU 42-28)

Top passers

- SHSU - Ty Brock - 24/49, 374 yards, 4 TD, 3 INT
- NSU - Shelton Eppler - 27/47, 351 yards, 3 TD, 2 INT

Top rushers

- SHSU - Kyron Jackson - 23 carries, 152 yards, TD
- NSU - Jared West - 17 carries, 71 yards

Top receivers

- SHSU - Kyron Jackson - 4 receptions, 116 yards
- NSU - Jazz Ferguson - 9 receptions, 138 yards, 2 TD

=== At Central Arkansas ===
Northwestern State at Central Arkansas – Game summary

| Quarter | 1 | 2 | 3 | 4 | Total |
|---|---|---|---|---|---|
| Demons | 0 | 10 | 0 | 7 | 17 |
| No. 15 Bears | 14 | 14 | 7 | 3 | 38 |

at Estes Stadium, Conway, AR

- Date: October 20
- Game time: 6:00 p.m. CST
- Game attendance: 6,754
- Referee: Cooper Castleberry

Game information

First quarter

- UCA - Jakari Dillard 31-yard TD pass from Luke Hales, Matt Cummins kick good, 13:04 (UCA 7-0)
- UCA - Lester Wells 53-yard TD pass from Hales, Cummins kick good, 1:02 (UCA 14-0)

Second quarter

- UCA - Lujuan Winningham 15-yard TD pass from Hales, Cummins kick good, 13:41 (UCA 21-0)
- NSU - Austyn Fendrick 35-yard field goal, 7:33 (UCA 21-3)
- UCA - Dillard 25-yard TD pass from Hales, Cummins kick good, 5:46 (UCA 28-3)
- NSU - Kaleb Fletcher 7-yard TD run, Fendrick kick good, 1:01 (UCA 28-10)

Third quarter

- UCA - Carlos Blackman 25-yard TD pass from Hales, Cummins kick good, 9:59 (UCA 35-10)

Fourth quarter

- UCA - Cummins 34-yard field goal, 6:57 (UCA 38-10)
- NSU - Jaylen Watson 53-yard TD pass from Kaleb Fletcher, Fendrick kick good, 0:39 (UCA 38-17)

Top passers

- UCA - Luke Hales - 12/28, 278 yards, 5 TD, INT
- NSU - Kaleb Fletcher - 16/29, 187 yards, TD

Top rushers

- UCA - Carlos Blackman - 14 carries, 84 yards
- NSU - Jared West - 10 carries, 52 yards

Top receivers

- UCA - Jakari Dillard - 4 receptions, 109 yards, 2 TD
- NSU - Jazz Ferguson - 8 receptions, 108 yards

=== Houston Baptist ===
Houston Baptist at Northwestern State – Game summary

| Quarter | 1 | 2 | 3 | 4 | Total |
|---|---|---|---|---|---|
| Huskies | 14 | 7 | 7 | 0 | 28 |
| Demons | 7 | 3 | 7 | 14 | 31 |

at Harry Turpin Stadium, Natchitoches, LA

- Date: October 27
- Game time: 6:00 p.m. CST
- Game weather: 81 °F (27 °C); sunny
- Game attendance: 7,098
- Referee: Christian Watso

Game information

First quarter

- NSU - Jaylen Watson 51-yard TD pass from Kenny Sears, Fendrick kick good, 13:10 (NSU 7-0)
- HBU - Bailey Zappe 68-yard TD run, David Dominguez kick good, 7:59 (TIE 7-7)
- HBU - David Racine 34-yard TD pass from Zappe, Dominguez kick good, 0:29 (HBU 14-7)

Second quarter

- NSU - Fendrick 38-yard field goal, 11:37 (HBU 14-10)
- HBU - Dreshawn Minnieweather 19-yard TD pass from Zappe, Dominguez kick good, 3:34 (HBU 21-10)

Third quarter

- HBU - Ladarius Dickens 15-yard TD pass from Zappe, Dominguez kick good, 7:31 (HBU 28-10)
- NSU - Watson 11-yard TD pass from Kaleb Fletcher, Fendrick kick good, 3:33 (HBU 28-17)

Fourth quarter

- NSU - Jazz Ferguson 13-yard TD pass from Fletcher, two-point conversion attempt no good, 9:34 (HBU 28-23)
- NSU - Ferguson 2-yard TD pass from Fletcher, Fletcher two-point conversion pass to Ferguson good, 4:12 (NSU 31-28)

Top passers

- NSU - Kaleb Fletcher - 30/44, 253 yards, 3 TD
- HBU - Bailey Zappe - 25/38, 251 yards, 3 TD, INT

Top rushers

- NSU - Jared West - 17 carries, 76 yards
- HBU - Bailey Zappe - 13 carries, 132 yards, TD

Top receivers

- NSU - Jaylen Watson - 6 receptions, 96 yards, 2 TD
- HBU - Jarreth Sterns - 8 receptions, 75 yards

=== At Abilene Christian ===
Northwestern State at Abilene Christian – Game summary

| Quarter | 1 | 2 | 3 | 4 | Total |
|---|---|---|---|---|---|
| Demons | 7 | 7 | 14 | 19 | 47 |
| Wildcats | 14 | 10 | 17 | 8 | 49 |

at Anthony Field at Wildcat Stadium, Abilene, TX

- Date: November 3
- Game time: 2:00 p.m. CST
- Game weather: 68 °F (20 °C); mostly cloudy
- Game attendance: 6,936
- Referee: Vidal Jones

Game information

First quarter

- NSU - Jaylen Watson 42-yard TD pass from Shelton Eppler, Austyn Fendrick kick good, 12:56 (NSU 7-0)
- ACU - Tracy James 13-yard TD run, Oscar Hernandez kick good, 10:05 (TIE 7-7)
- ACU - Billy McCrary 4-yard TD run, Hernandez kick good, 3:42 (ACU 14-7)

Second quarter

- ACU - Hernandez 23-yard field goal, 13:02 (ACU 17-7)
- NSU - Bryson Bourque 30-yard TD pass from Eppler, Fendrick kick good, 8:22 (ACU 17-14)
- ACU - James 2-yard TD pass from Luke Anthony, Hernandez kick good, 0:15 (ACU 24-14)

Third quarter

- ACU - Tyrese White 2-yard TD pass from Anthony, Hernandez kick good, 12:16 (ACU 31-14)
- ACU - Hernandez 23-yard field goal, 9:58 (ACU 34-14)
- NSU - Jazz Ferguson 25-yard TD pass from Eppler, Fendrick kick good, 8:28 (ACU 34-21)
- NSU - Ferguson 33-yard TD pass from Eppler, Fendrick kick good, 5:07 (ACU 34-28)
- ACU - James 10-yard TD pass from Anthony, Hernandez kick good, 2:53 (ACU 41-28)

Fourth quarter

- NSU - Stadford Anderson 3-yard TD run, Fendrick kick good, 7:16 (ACU 41-35)
- ACU - Qua'Shawn Washington 37-yard interception returned for TD, James two-point conversion run good, 4:39 (ACU 49-35)
- NSU - Bourque 19-yard Td pass from Eppler, Fendrick kick no good, 3:09 (ACU 49-41)
- NSU - Ferguson 13-yard TD pass from Eppler, two-point conversion run attempt no good, 1:34 (ACU 49-47)

Top passers

- ACU - Luke Anthony - 31/47, 344 yards, 3 TD, INT
- NSU - Shelton Eppler - 25/41, 367 yards, 6 TD, 3 INT

Top rushers

- ACU - Tracy James - 24 carries, 93 yards, TD
- NSU - Jared West - 15 carries, 29 yards

Top receivers

- ACU - Kalin Sadler - 6 receptions, 85 yards
- NSU - Jazz Ferguson - 4 receptions, 82 yards, 3 TD

=== McNeese State ===
McNeese State at Northwestern State – Game summary

| Quarter | 1 | 2 | 3 | 4 | OT | Total |
|---|---|---|---|---|---|---|
| No. 18 Cowboys | 0 | 7 | 14 | 10 | 3 | 34 |
| Demons | 0 | 0 | 14 | 17 | 6 | 37 |

at Harry Turpin Stadium, Natchitoches, LA

- Date: November 10
- Game time: 6:00 p.m. CST
- Game weather: 46 °F (8 °C); cool and cloudy
- Game attendance: 6,111
- Referee: Eddie Shelton
- TV: ESPN3

Game information

Second quarter

- MCNS - Trevor Begue 3-yard TD pass from James Tabary, Gunnar Raborn kick good, 1:14 (MCNS 7-0)

Third quarter

- NSU - Jared West 19-yard TD run, Austyn Fendrick kick good, 11:15 (TIE 7-7)
- MCNS - Cyron Sutton 61-yard TD pass from Tabary, Raborn kick good, 10:52 (MCNS 14-7)
- MCNS - Ryan Ross 2-yard TD run, Raborn kick good, 5:10 (MCNS 21-7)
- NSU - Kalen Meggs 27-yard TD pass from Shelton Eppler, Fendrick kick good, 2:24 (MCNS 21-14)

Fourth quarter

- NSU - Fendrick 36-yard field goal, 12:04 (MCNS 21-17)
- MCNS - Rodnell Cruell 26-yard TD pass from Tabary, Raborn kick good, 10:50 (MCNS 28-17)
- NSU - Jazz Ferguson 2-yard TD pass from Eppler, two-point conversion attempt no good, 7:35 (MCNS 28-23)
- MCNS - Raborn 27-yard field goal, 2:27 (MCNS 31-23)
- NSU - Jaylen Watson 19-yard TD pass from Eppler, Eppler two-point conversion pass to Ferguson good, 0:27 (TIE 31-31)

Second overtime

- MCNS - Raborn 38-yard field goal (MCNS 34-31)
- NSU - Ferguson 6-yard TD pass from Eppler (NSU 37-34)

Top passers

- NSU - Shelton Eppler - 25/46, 292 yards, 4 TD
- MCNS - James Tabary - 15/27, 203 yards, 3 TD

Top rushers

- NSU - Jared West - 12 carries, 61 yards, TD
- MCNS - David Hamm - 11 carries, 49 yards

Top receivers

- NSU - Jazz Ferguson - 9 receptions, 112 yards, 2 TD
- MCNS - Cyron Sutton - 6 receptions, 119 yards, TD

=== At Stephen F. Austin ===
Northwestern State at Stephen F. Austin – Game summary

| Quarter | 1 | 2 | 3 | 4 | Total |
|---|---|---|---|---|---|
| Demons | 0 | 7 | 14 | 14 | 35 |
| Lumberjacks | 0 | 16 | 0 | 7 | 23 |

at Homer Bryce Stadium, Nacogdoches, TX

- Date: November 15
- Game time: 6:00 p.m. CST
- Game weather: 49 °F (9 °C); mostly clear
- Game attendance: 2,611
- Referee: Vidal Jones
- TV: Eleven Sports

Game information

Second quarter

- SFA - Storm Ruiz 43-yard field goal, 14:17 (SFA 3-0)
- NSU - Stadford Anderson 1-yard TD run, Korbin Schmidt kick good, 10:27 (NSU 7-3)
- SFA - Tamrick Pace 71-yard TD pass from Foster Sawyer, Ruiz kick good, 9:44 (SFA 10-7)
- SFA - Ruiz 22-yard field goal, 1:12 (SFA 13-7)
- SFA - Ruiz 32-yard field goal, 0:00 (SFA 16-7)

Third quarter

- NSU - Myles Ward 94-yard kickoff returned for TD, Schmidt kick good, 14:46 (SFA 16-14)
- NSU - Jaylen Watson 20-yard TD pass from Shelton Eppler, Schmidt kick good, 8:00 (NSU 21-16)

Fourth quarter

- NSU - Watson 75-yard TD pass from Eppler, Schmidt kick good, 12:52 (NSU 28-16)
- SFA - Dominic Williams 5-yard TD run, Ruiz kick good, 8:44 (NSU 28-23)
- NSU - Jared West 5-yard TD run, Schmidt kick good, 5:25 (NSU 35-23)

Top passers

- NSU - Shelton Eppler - 20/31, 295 yards, 2 TD, 3 INT
- SFA - Foster Sawyer - 30/50, 325 yards, TD

Top rushers

- NSU - Jared West - 20 carries, 98 yards, TD
- SFA - Josh McGowen - 12 carries, 67 yards

Top receivers

- NSU - Jaylen Watson - 4 receptions, 123 yards, 2 TD
- SFA - Terian Goree - 10 receptions, 138 yards

== Roster ==
2018 Northwestern State Demons football team roster
Players
Coaches
Offense

| Pos. | # | Name | Class |
|---|---|---|---|
| WR | 1 | Jazz Ferguson | Jr |
| QB | 2 | Kaleb Fletcher | So |
| WR | 3 | Marquisian Chapman | Sr |
| WR | 6 | Lyndemian Brooks | Jr |
| QB | 4 | Clay Holgorsen | Sr |
| QB | 5 | Shelton Eppler | Jr |
| WR | 6 | Quan Shorts | Jr |
| QB | 7 | Aaron Howell | Fr |
| WR | 8 | Jaylen Watson | Sr |
| QB | 9 | Kenny Sears | Fr |
| WR | 10 | Myles Ward | Fr |
| WR | 11 | Tanner Ash | Fr |
| RB | 13 | Stadford Anderson | So |
| WR | 14 | Bryson Bourque | Sr |
| WR | 15 | Jalen Willis | Fr |
| WR | 16 | Coby McGee | Fr |
| QB | 17 | Carl Randall | Fr |
| WR | 18 | Kendrick Price | Fr |
| WR | 19 | Curtis Williams | Fr |
| RB | 20 | Trevor Morgan | Fr |
| RB | 21 | Jared West | Jr |
| RB | 22 | Da'Von Smith | So |
| RB | 25 | JaQuan Jackson | Fr |
| WR | 26 | Connor Bailey | Fr |
| TE | 31 | Charles Vaughn | Sr |
| WR | 40 | Shermaria Lewis | So |
| RB | 42 | Matthew Nelson | Fr |
| OL | 54 | Brody Griffin | Jr |
| OL | 56 | Kenny Sheldon | Fr |
| OL | 57 | Timmis Bonner | Sr |
| OL | 59 | Jalen Haydel | So |
| OL | 60 | Tyler Rapp | Jr |
| OL | 61 | Frank Boudreaux | Sr |
| OL | 62 | Jake Gore | Fr |
| OL | 63 | Alyzcha Ulufale-Hentz | Fr |
| OL | 64 | Reggie Young | Fr |
| OL | 66 | Kyrin Tucker | Sr |
| OL | 68 | Demetrius Boulieu | So |
| OL | 70 | Jonathan Hubbard | Jr |
| OL | 72 | Khalil Corbett-Canada | So |
| OL | 73 | Zachary Perry | So |
| OL | 74 | Chris Zirkle | Sr |
| OL | 75 | Dustin Burns | Jr |
| OL | 77 | Parker Fink | Fr |
| OL | 79 | Chris Elam | Fr |
| TE | 81 | Kalen Meggs | Sr |
| WR | 82 | Levar Gumms | Fr |
| TE | 83 | Christian Bailiff | Fr |
| WR | 84 | Gavin Landry | So |
| WR | 85 | Floyd Turner | So |
| WR | 87 | Reggie Williford | Fr |
| TE | 88 | Tyler O'Donoghue | Jr |
| WR | 89 | McKane Kinchen | Fr |

Defense

| Pos. | # | Name | Class |
|---|---|---|---|
| CB | 1 | Tobias Williams | Fr |
| CB | 2 | D'Ronne Littleton | Jr |
| CB | 3 | Shemar Bartholomew | Fr |
| S | 4 | Cedric Anderson | Fr |
| LB | 5 | Jalen Angelle | Fr |
| CB | 6 | Rashaun Croney | Sr |
| S | 7 | Kevin Ratliff | Jr |
| S | 8 | Ryan Reed | Jr |
| S | 10 | Jordan Hester | Fr |
| LB | 11 | Obinna Iheoma | Sr |
| LB | 14 | Jomard Valsin Jr. | Fr |
| CB | 15 | William Hooper | Fr |
| CB | 16 | Fredrick Lee Jr. | Fr |
| DE | 17 | Braylon Daigle | So |
| S | 18 | Ronald Malbrough | Jr |
| S | 19 | Tevyn Johnson | So |
| CB | 20 | Malik Sonnier | So |
| S | 21 | Deshon Ficklin | Jr |
| CB | 22 | Dazarie Hall | So |
| S | 23 | Nicholas Forde | Jr |
| S | 24 | Ian Edwards | Jr |
| S | 25 | Hayden Bourgeois | So |
| CB | 26 | Keldrick Ward | Fr |
| S | 27 | Trent Franklin | Fr |
| CB | 28 | Dylan Wilson | Sr |
| S | 29 | Trey Williams | Fr |
| LB | 30 | Bishop Breaux | Fr |
| CB | 31 | Jalen Garrison | Fr |
| LB | 33 | Isaiah Longino | So |
| LB | 35 | Landon King | Fr |
| LB | 36 | Corban James | Fr |
| S | 37 | Cooper Bledsoe | Fr |
| LB | 38 | Quindarrius Whitley | Jr |
| LB/S | 39 | Kyle Moore | So |
| S | 40 | Tekiren Evans | Fr |
| NT | 42 | Christian Bluiett | Jr |
| LB | 43 | Blake Stephenson | Jr |
| LB | 45 | Dez Gray | Jr |
| LB | 46 | Darion Miller | Fr |
| LB | 47 | Rashuad Powell | Fr |
| S | 49 | Keenan Leachman | Fr |
| LB | 50 | Ricky Chatman | So |
| NT | 51 | Nathalohn Nanai | Fr |
| DE | 52 | Desmond Prejean | Jr |
| LB | 53 | Brice Borgeson | Jr |
| DT | 55 | O'Shea Jackson | Jr |
| DT | 58 | Myles Mitchell | Fr |
| LB | 59 | Peyton Fredieu | Fr |
| NT | 70 | Khalil Sumlin | So |
| NT | 78 | Joey McNeely | Fr |
| NT | 90 | Jalon Sangster | Sr |
| DE | 91 | Jarviar Wade | Fr |
| DE | 92 | J. D. May | Fr |
| DE | 93 | Tyree Cormier | Fr |
| DE | 94 | Zak Krolczyk | Sr |
| DE | 95 | Jordan Greenlee | Jr |
| DE | 97 | John-Alex Perkins | Fr |
| NT | 98 | Savon Gipson | Fr |
| NT | 99 | Damian Thompson | So |

Special teams

| Pos. | # | Name | Class |
|---|---|---|---|
| P | 9 | Parker Pastorello | Jr |
| LS | 30 | Brandon Eberts | So |
| K/P | 48 | Austyn Fendricks | Fr |
| K/P | 50 | Korbin Schmidt | Fr |
| LS | 55 | Evan Gibson | Fr |

Head coach

- Brad Laird (Northwestern State)

Coordinators/assistant coaches

- Brad Smiley (Baylor)
  Offensive coordinator, Running Backs
- Mike Lucas (William & Mary)
  Defensive coordinator, Linebackers
- De'Von Lockett (Northwestern State)
  Assistant Coach, Cornerbacks
- Gerald Howse (Georgia)
  Assistant Coach, Running Backs
- Jamaal Lewis (Southwestern Oklahoma State)
  Assistant Coach, Tight Ends
- Ledell Love (Northwestern State)
  Assistant Coach, Defensive Line
- Jake Olsen (Valley City State)
  Safeties, Recruiting Coordinator
- J Pond (Texas A&M)
  Assistant Coach, Offensive Line
- Anthony Scelfo (Tulane)
  Assistant Coach, Quarterbacks
- Alvin Slaughter (Clarion)
  Assistant Coach, Wide Receivers

Legend

- (C) Team captain
- (S) Suspended
- (I) Ineligible
- Injured
- Redshirt

Roster
Last update: April 27, 2019
