= List of 2019 NFL draft early entrants =

This list consists of college football players who forfeited remaining collegiate eligibility and were declared by the National Football League to be eligible to be selected in the 2019 NFL draft. This includes juniors and redshirt sophomores who completed high school at least three years prior to the draft. A player that meets these requirements can renounce his remaining NCAA eligibility and enter the draft. Players had until January 14, 2019 to declare their intention to forgo their collegiate eligibility.

== Terminology ==
| Year | Interpretation |
|---|---|
| (redshirt) Sophomore | "redshirt sophomore" – an academic junior in his second season of athletic participation |
| (redshirt) Junior | "redshirt junior" – an academic senior in his third season of athletic participation; also known as a "fourth-year junior" |

== Declared Players ==
The following players had 2019 draft eligibility granted, or confirmed, by the NFL.

| Name | Position | School | Year | Round | Pick | Team |
|---|---|---|---|---|---|---|
| Ed Alexander | DT | LSU | Junior | Undrafted | | |
| Jeff Allison | LB | Fresno State | Junior | Undrafted | | |
| Rodney Anderson | RB | Oklahoma | (redshirt) Junior | 6 | 211 | Cincinnati Bengals |
| J. J. Arcega-Whiteside | WR | Stanford | (redshirt) Junior | 2 | 57 | Philadelphia Eagles |
| Alex Barnes | RB | Kansas State | (redshirt) Junior | Undrafted | | |
| Mike Bell | S | Fresno State | (redshirt) Junior | Undrafted | | |
| Nick Bosa | DE | Ohio State | Junior | 1 | 2 | San Francisco 49ers |
| Venzell Boulware | OG | Miami | (redshirt) Junior | Undrafted | | |
| Miles Boykin | WR | Notre Dame | (redshirt) Junior | 3 | 93 | Baltimore Ravens |
| Jordan Brailford | DE | Oklahoma State | (redshirt) Junior | 7 | 253 | Washington Redskins |
| A. J. Brown | WR | Ole Miss | Junior | 2 | 51 | Tennessee Titans |
| Keenen Brown | TE | Texas State | Junior | Undrafted | | |
| Marquise Brown | WR | Oklahoma | Junior | 1 | 25 | Baltimore Ravens |
| Sean Murphy-Bunting | CB | Central Michigan | (redshirt) Junior | 2 | 39 | Tampa Bay Buccaneers |
| Brian Burns | DE | Florida State | Junior | 1 | 16 | Carolina Panthers |
| Devin Bush Jr. | ILB | Michigan | Junior | 1 | 10 | Pittsburgh Steelers |
| Hakeem Butler | WR | Iowa State | (redshirt) Junior | 4 | 103 | Arizona Cardinals |
| Hamp Cheevers | CB | Boston College | Junior | Undrafted | | |
| Xavier Crawford | CB | Central Michigan | Junior | 6 | 195 | Houston Texans |
| Damarea Crockett | RB | Missouri | Junior | Undrafted | | |
| Maxx Crosby | DE | Eastern Michigan | (redshirt) Junior | 4 | 106 | Oakland Raiders |
| Jamel Dean | CB | Auburn | (redshirt) Junior | 3 | 94 | Tampa Bay Buccaneers |
| Tyrel Dodson | LB | Texas A&M | Junior | Undrafted | | |
| Greg Dortch | WR | Wake Forest | (redshirt) Sophomore | Undrafted | | |
| Clifton Duck | CB | Appalachian State | Junior | Undrafted | | |
| Jovon Durante | WR | Florida Atlantic | Junior | Undrafted | | |
| David Edwards | OT | Wisconsin | (redshirt) Junior | 5 | 169 | Los Angeles Rams |
| Noah Fant | TE | Iowa | Junior | 1 | 20 | Denver Broncos |
| Jazz Ferguson | WR | Northwestern State | Junior | Undrafted | | |
| Cody Ford | OT | Oklahoma | (redshirt) Junior | 2 | 38 | Buffalo Bills |
| C. J. Gardner-Johnson | S | Florida | Junior | 4 | 105 | New Orleans Saints |
| Rashan Gary | DE | Michigan | Junior | 1 | 12 | Green Bay Packers |
| Joe Giles-Harris | LB | Duke | (redshirt) Junior | Undrafted | | |
| Kevin Givens | DT | Penn State | (redshirt) Junior | Undrafted | | |
| Mecole Hardman | WR | Georgia | Junior | 2 | 56 | Kansas City Chiefs |
| Kelvin Harmon | WR | NC State | Junior | 6 | 206 | Washington Redskins |
| N'Keal Harry | WR | Arizona State | Junior | 1 | 32 | New England Patriots |
| Dwayne Haskins | QB | Ohio State | (redshirt) Sophomore | 1 | 15 | Washington Redskins |
| Darrell Henderson | RB | Memphis | Junior | 3 | 70 | Los Angeles Rams |
| Nate Herbig | OG | Stanford | Junior | Undrafted | | |
| Justice Hill | RB | Oklahoma State | Junior | 4 | 113 | Baltimore Ravens |
| Trysten Hill | DT | UCF | Junior | 2 | 58 | Dallas Cowboys |
| Elijah Holyfield | RB | Georgia | Junior | Undrafted | | |
| Travis Homer | RB | Miami | Junior | 6 | 204 | Seattle Seahawks |
| Amani Hooker | S | Iowa | Junior | 4 | 116 | Tennessee Titans |
| Lil'Jordan Humphrey | WR | Texas | Junior | Undrafted | | |
| Tyree Jackson | QB | Buffalo | (redshirt) Junior | Undrafted | | |
| Andre James | OT | UCLA | (redshirt) Junior | Undrafted | | |
| Diontae Johnson | WR | Toledo | (redshirt) Junior | 3 | 66 | Pittsburgh Steelers |
| Daniel Jones | QB | Duke | (redshirt) Junior | 1 | 8 | New York Giants |
| Dre'Mont Jones | DT | Ohio State | Junior | 3 | 71 | Denver Broncos |
| Michael Jordan | OT | Ohio State | Junior | 4 | 136 | Cincinnati Bengals |
| Vosean Joseph | LB | Florida | Junior | 5 | 147 | Buffalo Bills |
| Dawson Knox | TE | Ole Miss | Junior | 3 | 96 | Buffalo Bills |
| Justin Layne | CB | Michigan State | Junior | 3 | 83 | Pittsburgh Steelers |
| Greg Little | OT | Ole Miss | Junior | 2 | 37 | Carolina Panthers |
| David Long Jr. | LB | West Virginia | (redshirt) Junior | 6 | 188 | Tennessee Titans |
| Alizé Mack | TE | Notre Dame | Junior | 7 | 231 | New Orleans Saints |
| Alexander Mattison | RB | Boise State | Junior | 3 | 102 | Minnesota Vikings |
| Erik McCoy | C | Texas A&M | Junior | 2 | 48 | New Orleans Saints |
| DK Metcalf | WR | Ole Miss | (redshirt) Sophomore | 2 | 64 | Seattle Seahawks |
| Jakobi Meyers | WR | NC State | (redshirt) Junior | Undrafted | | |
| Shareef Miller | DE | Penn State | (redshirt) Junior | 4 | 138 | Philadelphia Eagles |
| Dillon Mitchell | WR | Oregon | Junior | 7 | 239 | Minnesota Vikings |
| David Montgomery | RB | Iowa State | Junior | 3 | 73 | Chicago Bears |
| Byron Murphy | CB | Washington | (redshirt) Sophomore | 2 | 33 | Arizona Cardinals |
| Isaac Nauta | TE | Georgia | Junior | 7 | 224 | Detroit Lions |
| Anthony Nelson | DE | Iowa | (redshirt) Junior | 4 | 107 | Tampa Bay Buccaneers |
| Ed Oliver | DT | Houston | Junior | 1 | 9 | Buffalo Bills |
| Jachai Polite | DE | Florida | Junior | 3 | 68 | New York Jets |
| Ryan Pulley | CB | Arkansas | (redshirt) Junior | Undrafted | | |
| Taylor Rapp | S | Washington | Junior | 2 | 61 | Los Angeles Rams |
| Anthony Ratliff-Williams | WR | North Carolina | Junior | Undrafted | | |
| Dax Raymond | TE | Utah State | (redshirt) Junior | Undrafted | | |
| Riley Ridley | WR | Georgia | Junior | 4 | 126 | Chicago Bears |
| Tyler Roemer | OT | San Diego State | (redshirt) Sophomore | Undrafted | | |
| Miles Sanders | RB | Penn State | Junior | 2 | 53 | Philadelphia Eagles |
| Quart'e Sapp | LB | Tennessee | (redshirt) Junior | Undrafted | | |
| Jordan Scarlett | RB | Florida | (redshirt) Junior | 5 | 154 | Carolina Panthers |
| LJ Scott | RB | Michigan State | Junior | Undrafted | | |
| Jeffery Simmons | DT | Mississippi State | Junior | 1 | 19 | Tennessee Titans |
| Devin Singletary | RB | Florida Atlantic | Junior | 3 | 74 | Buffalo Bills |
| Darius Slayton | WR | Auburn | (redshirt) Junior | 5 | 171 | New York Giants |
| Kaden Smith | TE | Stanford | (redshirt) Sophomore | 6 | 176 | San Francisco 49ers |
| Sutton Smith | DE | Northern Illinois | (redshirt) Junior | 6 | 175 | Pittsburgh Steelers |
| Benny Snell | RB | Kentucky | Junior | 4 | 122 | Pittsburgh Steelers |
| Dredrick Snelson | WR | UCF | Junior | Undrafted | | |
| Jace Sternberger | TE | Texas A&M | (redshirt) Junior | 3 | 75 | Green Bay Packers |
| Jarrett Stidham | QB | Auburn | Junior | 4 | 133 | New England Patriots |
| William Sweet | OT | North Carolina | (redshirt) Junior | Undrafted | | |
| Josiah Tauaefa | LB | UTSA | (redshirt) Junior | Undrafted | | |
| Jawaan Taylor | OT | Florida | Junior | 2 | 35 | Jacksonville Jaguars |
| Darwin Thompson | RB | Utah State | Junior | 6 | 214 | Kansas City Chiefs |
| John Ursua | WR | Hawaii | (redshirt) Junior | 7 | 236 | Seattle Seahawks |
| Kahale Warring | TE | San Diego State | (redshirt) Junior | 3 | 86 | Houston Texans |
| Mike Weber | RB | Ohio State | (redshirt) Junior | 7 | 218 | Dallas Cowboys |
| Antoine Wesley | WR | Texas Tech | Junior | Undrafted | | |
| Kerrith Whyte Jr. | RB | Florida Atlantic | (redshirt) Junior | 7 | 222 | Chicago Bears |
| Greedy Williams | CB | LSU | Junior | 2 | 46 | Cleveland Browns |
| James Williams | RB | Washington State | (redshirt) Junior | Undrafted | | |
| Joejuan Williams | CB | Vanderbilt | Junior | 2 | 45 | New England Patriots |
| Preston Williams | WR | Colorado State | Junior | Undrafted | | |
| Trayveon Williams | RB | Texas A&M | Junior | 6 | 182 | Cincinnati Bengals |
| Caleb Wilson | TE | UCLA | Junior | 7 | 254 | Arizona Cardinals |
