= Hamp Cheevers =

American football player (born 1996)

No. 4
- Position: Defensive back

Personal information
- Born: December 23, 1996 (age 29); Gainesville, Florida, U.S.
- Listed height: 5 ft 10 in (1.78 m)
- Listed weight: 180 lb (82 kg)

Career information
- High school: Trenton (FL)
- College: Boston College (2016–2018)
- NFL draft: 2019: undrafted

Career history
- Tennessee Titans (2019)*; Atlanta Falcons (2019)*; Oakland Raiders (2019)*; Saskatchewan Roughriders (2020–2021)*
- * Offseason or practice squad member only

Awards and highlights
- First-team All-American (2018); First-team All-Atlantic Coast Conference (2018)
- Stats at Pro Football Reference

Hamp Anferenee Timmone Cheevers (born December 23, 1996) is an American former college football player who was a defensive back for the Boston College Eagles. He earned first-team All-American honors in 2018. Cheevers was signed by the Tennessee Titans of the National Football League (NFL) after going unselected in the 2019 NFL draft. He later had stints with the Atlanta Falcons and Oakland Raiders in the NFL, and with the Saskatchewan Roughriders in the Canadian Football League (CFL).

== Early life and education ==
Cheevers was born on December 23, 1996, in Gainesville, Florida. He attended Trenton High School in Florida and played on both sides of the field, on offense as a wide receiver and running back and on defense as a defensive back. There, he was an all-state selection and was named second-team small school All-American by MaxPreps. He was team captain as a senior and helped lead his team to the Florida 1A State Championship while being named Small School Player of the Year by The Gainesville Sun.

After graduating from Trenton, Cheevers committed to attending Boston College. He appeared in a total of six games as a true freshman for the Eagles, mainly on special teams. As a sophomore in 2017, Cheevers played in 12 games and was a starter in the last three at cornerback. He made two interceptions, placing second on the team, and recorded 17 total tackles, which included 2.5 for a loss.

Cheevers became a full-time starter in 2018 as a junior, and finished the season as the national leader in interceptions with seven. He was named first-team All-Atlantic Coast Conference (ACC) and was selected to six College Football All-America Teams, including being named a first-team choice by the Football Writers of America. According to Pro Football Focus (PFF), Cheevers graded out at 90.0 on the season, which was the fourth-highest nationally for cornerbacks. Quarterbacks who targeted the player covered by Cheevers averaged a passer rating of just 26.4. At the end of the year, he was given the George "Bulger" Lowe Award by the Gridiron Club of Boston, an honor bestowed upon the best offensive or defensive player in New England.

Although Cheevers had one more year of eligibility left in 2019, he decided to declare early for the NFL draft. He finished his three-year college career with 56 tackles and nine interceptions in 30 total games played.

== Professional career ==
Pre-draft measurables
Height	Weight	Arm length	Hand span	40-yard dash	20-yard shuttle	Three-cone drill	Vertical jump	Broad jump	Bench press
5 ft 9 in (1.75 m)	169 lb (77 kg)	30 1/2 in (0.77 m)	8 5/8 in (0.22 m)	4.52 s	4.25 s	6.96 s	39 in (0.99 m)	10 ft 2 in (3.10 m)	8 reps
All values from NFL Scouting Combine

After going unselected in the 2019 NFL draft, Cheevers was signed by the Tennessee Titans as an undrafted free agent. He was waived/injured on May 13 and was placed on the injured reserve list the following day. He was released by the Titans on May 17, after spending just over a week with the team.

On August 2, 2019, Cheevers was signed by the Atlanta Falcons. He was released one week later, on August 9, to make room for Chase Middleton. Two days later, on August 11, Cheevers was claimed off waivers by the Oakland Raiders, who then waived him on August 13. While a free agent, on October 11, he was suspended for four games by the NFL. He was reinstated on November 5.

On January 29, 2020, Cheevers was signed by the Saskatchewan Roughriders of the Canadian Football League (CFL). The entire 2020 season was canceled due to COVID-19, and Cheevers was released by the Roughriders on July 28, 2021.
