= 1950 Western Kentucky Hilltoppers football team =

American college football season

1950 Western Kentucky Hilltoppers football
- Conference: Ohio Valley Conference
- Record: 6–2–2 (3–1–2 OVC)
- Head coach: Jack Clayton (3rd season)
- Captains: Roy Hina; Joe Talley

1950 Ohio Valley Conference football standings
	Conf.					Overall
Team	W		L		T	W		L		T
Murray State $	5	–	0	–	1	7	–	2	–	1
Western Kentucky	3	–	1	–	2	6	–	2	–	2
Eastern Kentucky	4	–	2	–	0	6	–	4	–	0
Morehead State	3	–	3	–	0	4	–	4	–	0
Marshall	2	–	4	–	0	2	–	8	–	0
Evansville	1	–	4	–	1	3	–	6	–	1
Tennessee Tech	1	–	5	–	0	4	–	7	–	0
$ – Conference champion

The 1950 Western Kentucky Hilltoppers football team represented Western Kentucky State College (now known as Western Kentucky University) as a member of the Ohio Valley Conference (OVC) during the 1950 college football season. Led by third-year head coach Jack Clayton, the Hilltoppers compiled an overall record of 6–2–2 with a mark of 3–1–2 in conference play, placing second in the OVC. The team's captains were Roy Hina and Joe Talley.

== Schedule ==
Date	Opponent	Site	Result	Attendance	Source
September 23	Howard (AL)*	Bowling Green, KY	W 13–0	2,500	
September 30	at Evansville	Evansville, IN	T 7–7		
October 7	Marshall*	Bowling Green, KY	L 13–47		
October 14	at Morehead State	Morehead, KY	W 23–21		
October 21	Georgetown (KY)	Bowling Green, KY	W 41–13		
October 15	at Tennessee Tech	Cookeville, TN	W 21–0		
November 4	at Delta State*	Cleveland, MS	W 26–7		
November 11	Eastern Kentucky^{†}	Bowling Green, KY (rivalry)	W 14–13		
November 19	Murray State	Bowling Green, KY (rivalry)	T 27–27		
November 25	at Stetson*	DeLand, FL	L 14–41		
*Non-conference game; ^{†}Homecoming
