= H. Lee Prather =

American football and basketball coach

Henry Lee Prather

Biographical details
- Born: October 10, 1886 near Odessa, Missouri, U.S.
- Died: September 23, 1964 (aged 77); Newellton, Louisiana, U.S.

Coaching career (HC unless noted)

Football
- 1912: Southwestern Louisiana Industrial
- 1913–1933: Louisiana Normal

Basketball
- 1912–1950: Louisiana Normal / Northwestern State

Head coaching record
- Overall: 86–57–12 (football); 473–169 (basketball)

Henry Lee Prather (October 10, 1886 – September 23, 1964) was an American football and basketball coach. He served as the head football coach at the Southwestern Louisiana Industrial Institute (SLII) for one season in 1912, compiling a record of 3–4. He is best known, however, for his tenures as the head football and men's basketball coach at Northwestern State University (NSU) in Natchitoches, Louisiana.

Prather coached the Demons football team between 1913 and 1917, and again from 1919 through 1933. The 1918 season was canceled because of World War I. In 20 seasons as coach at NSU, Prather compiled an overall record of 83–53–12. Including his one season at SLII, his overall football record was 86–57–12.

As the head basketball coach at Northwestern State, Prather's tenure was very interrupted. He was the on-again, off-again coach seven different times. Basketball had not quite become as established as a sport as football in the United States, so he alternated many of the years with having no program at all. In his 35 total years as the school's coach, Prather accumulated an overall record of 473–169. He stepped down in 1950 to become Northwestern State University's president in 1951. He is still the all-time leader in victories for men's basketball by more than 300 wins to the second-closest coach, Red Thomas, who compiled 138 between 1950 and 1957.

Northwestern State's basketball arena, Prather Coliseum, is named in his honor.

== Head coaching record ==
=== Football ===
Year	Team	Overall	Conference	Standing	Bowl/playoffs
Southwestern Louisiana Industrial (Independent) (1912)
1912	Southwestern Louisiana Industrial	3–4			
Southwestern Louisiana Industrial:		3–4			
Louisiana Normal Demons (Independent) (1913–1914)
1913	Louisiana Normal	3–2			
1914	Louisiana Normal	4–1–1			
Louisiana Normal Demons (Louisiana Intercollegiate Athletic Association) (1915–1924)
1915	Louisiana Normal	4–2	3–2		
1916	Louisiana Normal	2–3	1–3		
1917	Louisiana Normal	3–1	1–1		
1918	No team—World War I				
1919	Louisiana Normal	5–2	3–2		
1920	Louisiana Normal	5–1–1	4–0–1		
1921	Louisiana Normal	3–3–1	2–2–1		
1922	Louisiana Normal	4–2–1	2–1–1		
1923	Louisiana Normal	3–6	0–4		
1924	Louisiana Normal	4–2–1	0–1–1		
Louisiana Normal Demons (Independent) (1925–1927)
1925	Louisiana Normal	5–3–1			
1926	Louisiana Normal	3–5–1			
1927	Louisiana Normal	2–3–2			
Louisiana Normal Demons (Southern Intercollegiate Athletic Association) (1928–1933)
1928	Louisiana Normal	5–4	1–3	T–24th	
1929	Louisiana Normal	4–3–2	1–0–2	T–6th	
1930	Louisiana Normal	7–2	4–1	T–7th	
1931	Louisiana Normal	5–4	2–4	T–19th	
1932	Louisiana Normal	7–1	4–1	T–7th	
1933	Louisiana Normal	5–3–1	2–3	T–17th	
Louisiana Normal:		83–53–12	30–28–6		
Total:		86–57–12			
National championship Conference title Conference division title or championship game berth

=== Basketball ===
Record table
Season	Team	Overall	Conference	Standing	Postseason
Northwestern State Demons (Louisiana Intercollegiate Athletic Conference) (1912–1948)
1912–13	Northwestern State	3–0			
1913–14	Northwestern State	Records unavailable			
1914–15	Northwestern State	5–2			
1915–16	Northwestern State	3–1			
1916–17	Northwestern State	14–1			
1917–18	No team—World War I				
1918–19	Northwestern State	10–1			
1919–20	Northwestern State	Records unavailable			
1920–21	Northwestern State	10–3			
1921–22	Northwestern State	10–5		1st	
1922–23	Northwestern State	8–7			
1923–24	Northwestern State	Records unavailable			
1924–25	Northwestern State	10–5			
1925–26	Northwestern State	13–1			
1926–27	Northwestern State	20–2			
1927–28	Northwestern State	11–2			
1928–29	Northwestern State	16–6			
1929–30	Northwestern State	8–11			
1930–31	Northwestern State	17–6			
1931–32	Northwestern State	15–1			
1932–33	Northwestern State	12–7			
1933–34	Northwestern State	12–10			
1934–35	Northwestern State	8–6			
1935–36	Northwestern State	12–6			
1936–37	Northwestern State	15–7			
1937–38	Northwestern State	Records unavailable			
1938–39	Northwestern State	16–4			
1939–40	Northwestern State	19–2		1st	
1940–41	Northwestern State	17–2			
1941–42	Northwestern State	5–11			
1942–43	Northwestern State	13–11			
1943–44	No team—World War II				
1944–45	No team—World War II				
1945–46	Northwestern State	18–9			
1946–47	Northwestern State	15–5			
1947–48	Northwestern State	19–6			
Northwestern State Demons (Gulf States Conference) (1948–1950)
1948–49	Northwestern State	23–5		1st	NAIA Semifinals
1949–50	Northwestern State	18–8			
Total:		473–169			
National champion Postseason invitational champion Conference regular season champion Conference regular season and conference tournament champion Division regular season champion Division regular season and conference tournament champion Conference tournament champion
