= Brad Laird =

American football coach (born 1973)

Current position
- Title: Head coach
- Team: Natchitoches Central HS (LA)
- Record: 7–14

Biographical details
- Born: June 20, 1973 (age 53)

Playing career
- 1991–1995: Northwestern State
- Position: Quarterback

Coaching career (HC unless noted)
- 1996: Northwestern State (GA)
- 1997: West Monroe HS (LA) (assistant)
- 1998: Ouachita HS (AR) (assistant)
- 1999–2000: Longview HS (TX) (QB)
- 2001–2002: Nashville HS (AR) (assistant)
- 2003–2004: Northwestern State (DC/LB)
- 2005: Northwestern State (DC/DB)
- 2007: Stephen F. Austin (LB)
- 2008: Northwestern State (DC)
- 2009: Northwestern State (AHC/co-DC)
- 2010–2011: Northwestern State (AHC/DC)
- 2013–2016: Ruston HS (LA)
- 2017: Northwestern State (AHC/DC)
- 2018–2023: Northwestern State
- 2024–present: Natchitoches Central HS (LA)

Head coaching record
- Overall: 16–41 (college); 35–32 (high school)

Brad Laird (born June 20, 1973) is an American college football coach. He is the head coach at Natchitoches Central High School in Natchitoches, Louisiana, a position he has held since 2024. He was the head football coach at Northwestern State University from 2018 to 2023. He previously served as an assistant football coach at Northwestern State, Stephen F. Austin State University, and various coaching positions at several high schools. Laird played college football at Northwestern State University, where he played quarterback.

== Head coaching career ==
=== Northwestern State ===
Laird was named head football coach at Northwestern State University on November 20, 2017. Laird resigned as the Demons' head coach on October 26, 2023; that same day, the university announced that the remainder of the football season would be cancelled to allow players and coaches time to grieve over the death of junior safety Ronnie Caldwell.

On November 5, 2023, Caldwell's parents filed a wrongful death lawsuit against the Quad Apartment Complex, where Caldwell lived and where the shooting occurred, and Laird. According to the lawsuit, Caldwell was placed in an apartment with McIntosh, who was not attending college and had a history of legal trouble, after mold was found in Caldwell's original apartment. The lawsuit also alleges that McIntosh pulled a gun on Caldwell three days before the shooting occurred. Caldwell then notified his father, Ronald, of the incident who then alerted Laird. Laird called Ronald, assuring him that he would immediately place Ronnie in a safe location.

== Head coaching record ==
=== College ===
Year	Team	Overall	Conference	Standing	Bowl/playoffs
Northwestern State Demons (Southland Conference) (2018–2023)
2018	Northwestern State	5–6	4–5	T–8th	
2019	Northwestern State	3–9	3–6	T–8th	
2020–21	Northwestern State	1–5	1–5	7th	
2021	Northwestern State	3–8	3–5	T–5th	
2022	Northwestern State	4–7	4–2	3rd	
2023	Northwestern State	0–6	0–2		
Northwestern State:		16–41	15–25		
Total:		16–41			

=== High school ===
Year	Team	Overall	Conference	Standing	Bowl/playoffs
Ruston Bearcats () (2013–2016)
2013	Ruston	8–4	3–2	3rd	L LHSAA Class 5A Regionals
2014	Ruston	7–5	4–1	2nd	L LHSAA Class 5A 1st Round
2015	Ruston	6–5	3–2	3rd	L LHSAA Class 5A 1st Round
2016	Ruston	7–4	4–1	2nd	L LHSAA Class 5A 1st Round
Ruston:		28–18	14–6		
Natchitoches Central Chiefs () (2024–present)
2024	Natchitoches Central	1–9	1–7	T-7th	
2025	Natchitoches Central	6–5	4–4	5th	L LHSAA Division I Non-Select Bi-District Round
2026	Natchitoches Central	1–9	1–5	9th	
Natchitoches Central:		7–14	5–11		
Total:		35–32			
