= Sam Goodwin =

Scottish footballer

Personal information
- Full name: Samuel Gourlay Goodwin
- Date of birth: 14 March 1943
- Place of birth: Tarbolton, Scotland
- Date of death: 9 March 2005 (aged 61)
- Place of death: Coatbridge, Scotland
- Position: Midfielder

Senior career*
Years	Team	Apps	(Gls)
- Craigmark Burntonians
1964–1971	Airdrieonians	196	(15)
1971–1972	Crystal Palace	25	(0)
1972–1975	Motherwell	64	(2)
1975–1976	Clydebank	24	(2)
Total		309	(19)

Managerial career
- 1976–1981: Albion Rovers
- * Club domestic league appearances and goals as of 14 November 2012

Samuel Gourlay Goodwin (14 March 1943 – 9 March 2005) was a Scottish footballer, who played for Airdrieonians, Crystal Palace, Motherwell and Clydebank. He was later manager of Albion Rovers before becoming a director of the club.

Goodwin died at the age of 61 in March 2005.
