= Jay Thomas (American football) =

American football coach

Biographical details
- Born: October 18, 1960 (age 66); Baker, Louisiana, U.S.
- Education: Southern Mississippi

Coaching career (HC unless noted)
- 1988–1989: LSU (GA)
- 1990–1992: Nicholls State (DE)
- 1993–1998: Southeast Missouri State (DL)
- 1999–2003: Nicholls State (AHC/DC/DL)
- 2004–2009: Nicholls State
- 2010–2011: Northwestern State (DL)
- 2012: Missouri Southern (DC)
- 2013–2017: Northwestern State

Head coaching record
- Overall: 48–71
- Tournaments: 0–1 (NCAA D-I-AA playoffs)

Accomplishments and honors

Championships
- 1 Southland (2005)

Awards
- Southland Coach of the Year (2005)

Jay Thomas (born October 18, 1960) is a former American college football coach, previously serving as the head football coach at Northwestern State University, a position he held from December 2012 until November 2017. He held the same capacity at Nicholls State University from 2004 to 2009. Thomas compiled an overall record of 48–71.

== Coaching career ==
Thomas began his coaching career as a high school coach and subsequently served as an assistant coach at Louisiana State, Nicholls State and Southeast Missouri. He returned to Nicholls State as the defensive coordinator in 1999 and was elevated to the head coach position in 2004. Following his firing in 2009, Thomas spent two seasons as assistant head coach and defensive line coach at Northwestern State before becoming the defensive coordinator at Missouri Southern in 2012.

On December 20, 2012, Thomas was hired as the head coach at Northwestern State. He was let go by Northwestern State after the 2017 football.

== Personal life ==
Thomas is an alumnus of the University of Southern Mississippi.

== Head coaching record ==
Year	Team	Overall	Conference	Standing	Bowl/playoffs	Rank^{#}
Nicholls State Colonels (Southland Conference) (2004–2009)
2004	Nicholls State	5–5	2–3	4th		
2005	Nicholls State	6–4	5–1	T–1st	L NCAA Division I-AA First Round	17
2006	Nicholls State	4–7	2–4	T–5th		
2007	Nicholls State	6–5	3–4	T–4th		
2008	Nicholls State	3–6	3–4	5th		
2009	Nicholls State	3–8	2–5	T–6th		
Nicholls State:		27–35	17–21			
Northwestern State Demons (Southland Conference) (2013–2017)
2013	Northwestern State	6–6	3–4	5th		
2014	Northwestern State	6–6	4–4	6th		
2015	Northwestern State	4–7	4–5	T–5th		
2016	Northwestern State	1–10	0–9	11th		
2017	Northwestern State	4–7	4–5	T–6th		
Northwestern State:		21–36	15–27			
Total:		48–71				
National championship Conference title Conference division title or championship game berth
^{#}Rankings from final Sports Network poll.
