= Chief Caddo =

- Northwestern State Demons Stephen F. Austin Lumberjacks
- Sport: Football
- First meeting: November 7, 1924; Louisiana Normal 7, Stephen F. Austin 3
- Latest meeting: November 19, 2026; Stephen F. Austin 66, Northwestern State 0
- Next meeting: 2027
- Trophy: Chief Caddo (1961–2019)

Statistics
- Total meetings: 79
- All-time series: Northwestern State leads, 45–31–3
- Trophy series: Northwestern State leads, 32–22–1
- Largest victory: Stephen F. Austin, 66-0 (2026)
- Longest win streak: Northwestern State, 7 (1927–1933), (1976–1982)
- Current win streak: Stephen F. Austin, 5 (2019–present)

Locations of Northwestern State and Stephen F. Austin

Chief Caddo is the name of the statue formerly given to the winner of the annual football game between Southland Conference members Northwestern State University (NSU) of Natchitoches, Louisiana and Stephen F. Austin State University (SFA) of Nacogdoches, Texas. Northwestern State University stopped participating in the exchange in 2021 after a Student Government Association and Faculty Senate joint resolution recognizing that Caddo Nation officials stated the statue was offensive, acknowledging the statue was inauthentic, and calling for the end to the practice.

Made of solid wood, Chief Caddo was one of the largest trophies in college football, standing 7.5-foot (2.3 m) and weighing in excess of 330-pound (150 kg).

== History ==
The idea of the statue was created in 1960 when longtime rivals NSU and SFA decided to award the winner of the game a trophy. The two schools settled on a wooden statue (both schools are located in heavily forested areas) supposedly representing an American Indian "chief" who, in European-American folklore originating in the 1930s, was responsible for settling the locations that became the cities in which university was located (both of which are named for branches of the tribe). Under the agreement, based on the results of the 1961 football game, the losing school would chop down a tree from one of its nearby forests, while the winning school would receive the log and carve the statue from it.

NSU won the 1961 game 35–19; thus, SFA delivered a 2,000-pound black gum log to NSU. Woodcarver Harold Green spent some 230 hours fashioning the statue. It was named "Chief Caddo," supposedly after the Native nation that first settled the two communities.

In June 2010, after years of transportation to and from games had left "Chief Caddo" in poor condition, the trophy was given a much-needed refurbishing. The project, headed by Bill Flynn (Flynn Paint & Decorating of Nacogdoches), undertook the restoration of the trophy. Among the many restorations to the trophy were: the repairing of the base, the construction and replacement of feathers in the headdress, the restaining and repainting of the entire trophy, and intricate detailing.

NSU and SFA played for this trophy from 1961 to 2019.

In 2024, NSU and SFA announced that with SFA's return to the Southland Conference, the rivalry would continue but with a new trophy. "The Chief" has "the same 7-foot-6, 320-pound dimensions as the original, commissioned by both universities in 1960. It is topped with a pitchfork on one end and an axe on the other, with scores from past games adorning the length of the trophy. The winning team will display the trophy with its representative logo facing upward." Both schools engaged in conversations with the Caddo Nation regarding plans to add a piece designed by the nation to the trophy.

Currently, the statue resides at Stephen F. Austin State University.

== Game results ==
Northwestern State victories	Stephen F. Austin victories	Tie games

No.	Date	Location	Winner	Score
1	November 7, 1924	Nacogdoches, TX	Louisiana Normal	7–3
2	November 6, 1925	Natchitoches, LA	Stephen F. Austin	7–6
3	November 6, 1926	Nacogdoches, TX	Stephen F. Austin	28–0
4	November 5, 1927	Nacogdoches, TX	Louisiana Normal	26–0
5	November 3, 1928	Shreveport, LA	Louisiana Normal	26–0
6	October 26, 1929	Natchitoches, LA	Louisiana Normal	41–6
7	November 8, 1930	Nacogdoches, TX	Louisiana Normal	21–20
8	November 6, 1931	Natchitoches, LA	Louisiana Normal	19–0
9	November 5, 1932	Nacogdoches, TX	Louisiana Normal	39–0
10	November 3, 1933	Natchitoches, LA	Louisiana Normal	39–0
11	November 2, 1934	Nacogdoches, TX	Tie	0–0
12	November 8, 1935	Natchitoches, LA	Stephen F. Austin	13–6
13	November 6, 1936	Nacogdoches, TX	Louisiana Normal	20–7
14	November 5, 1937	Natchitoches, LA	Stephen F. Austin	2–0
15	November 4, 1938	Nacogdoches, TX	Louisiana Normal	6–0
16	November 3, 1939	Natchitoches, LA	Louisiana Normal	20–6
17	November 2, 1940	Nacogdoches, TX	Stephen F. Austin	14–7
18	November 29, 1946	Natchitoches, LA	Northwestern State	27–6
19	September 15, 1956	Shreveport, LA	Stephen F. Austin	14–12
20	September 14, 1957	Shreveport, LA	Northwestern State	20–7
21	September 12, 1959	Shreveport, LA	Tie	14–14
22	September 17, 1960	Shreveport, LA	Northwestern State	14–0
23	September 16, 1961	Shreveport, LA	Northwestern State	35–19
24	September 15, 1962	Shreveport, LA	Northwestern State	23–6
25	September 14, 1963	Shreveport, LA	Stephen F. Austin	10–0
26	September 19, 1964	Shreveport, LA	Northwestern State	34–14
27	September 19, 1970	Nacogdoches, TX	Northwestern State	9–7
28	September 18, 1971	Nacogdoches, TX	Northwestern State	18–7
29	September 16, 1972	Natchitoches, LA	Northwestern State	20–7
30	September 21, 1974	Natchitoches, LA	Stephen F. Austin	14–13
31	September 20, 1975	Nacogdoches, TX	Stephen F. Austin	17–13
32	September 18, 1976	Natchitoches, LA	Northwestern State	47–0
33	September 24, 1977	Nacogdoches, TX	Northwestern State	20–6
34	September 16, 1978	Nacogdoches, TX	Northwestern State	21–14
35	September 15, 1979	Natchitoches, LA	Northwestern State	27–21
36	September 20, 1980	Nacogdoches, TX	Northwestern State	22–3
37	September 19, 1981	Natchitoches, LA	Northwestern State	42–13
38	September 18, 1982	Nacogdoches, TX	Northwestern State	28–14
39	October 1, 1983	Natchitoches, LA	Stephen F. Austin	27–25
40	November 17, 1984	Nacogdoches, TX	Stephen F. Austin	22–18

No.	Date	Location	Winner	Score
41	November 23, 1985	Natchitoches, LA	Stephen F. Austin	19–10
42	November 22, 1986	Nacogdoches, TX	Stephen F. Austin	28–14
43	November 21, 1987	Natchitoches, LA	Northwestern State	33–21
44	November 19, 1988	Nacogdoches, TX	Northwestern State	20–17
45	September 18, 1989	Natchitoches, LA	Tie	17–17
46	November 17, 1990	Natchitoches, LA	Northwestern State	20–3
47	November 23, 1991	Natchitoches, LA	Northwestern State	52–0
48	November 21, 1992	Nacogdoches, TX	Northwestern State	24–10
49	November 20, 1993	Natchitoches, LA	Stephen F. Austin	51–20
50	November 19, 1994	Nacogdoches, TX	Stephen F. Austin	34–13
51	November 16, 1995	Natchitoches, LA	Stephen F. Austin	25–20
52	November 23, 1996	Nacogdoches, TX	Northwestern State	17–10
53	November 20, 1997	Natchitoches, LA	Northwestern State	38–24
54	November 21, 1998	Nacogdoches, TX	Northwestern State	35–21
55	November 20, 1999	Natchitoches, LA	Stephen F. Austin	29–14
56	November 18, 2000	Nacogdoches, TX	Stephen F. Austin	17–3
57	November 17, 2001	Natchitoches, LA	Northwestern State	31–17
58	November 23, 2002	Nacogdoches, TX	Northwestern State	42–35
59	November 22, 2003	Natchitoches, LA	Stephen F. Austin	44–14
60	November 20, 2004	Nacogdoches, TX	Northwestern State	37–16
61	November 17, 2005	Natchitoches, LA	Northwestern State	41–21
62	November 16, 2006	Nacogdoches, TX	Stephen F. Austin	20–11
63	November 17, 2007	Natchitoches, LA	Northwestern State	31–12
64	November 22, 2008	Nacogdoches, TX	Northwestern State	34–24
65	November 21, 2009	Natchitoches, LA	Stephen F. Austin	19–10
66	November 20, 2010	Nacogdoches, TX	Stephen F. Austin	36–13
67	November 19, 2011	Natchitoches, LA	Stephen F. Austin	33–0
68	November 17, 2012	Nacogdoches, TX	Stephen F. Austin	34–17
69	November 23, 2013	Natchitoches, LA	Northwestern State	40–27
70	November 22, 2014	Nacogdoches, TX	Stephen F. Austin	27–24
71	November 21, 2015	Natchitoches, LA	Northwestern State	33–17
72	November 19, 2016	Nacogdoches, TX	Stephen F. Austin	45–31
73	November 18, 2017	Natchitoches, LA	Northwestern State	38–21
74	November 15, 2018	Nacogdoches, TX	Northwestern State	35–23
75	November 21, 2019	Natchitoches, LA	Stephen F. Austin	32–20
76	September 16, 2023	Natchitoches, LA	Stephen F. Austin	41–7
77	October 5, 2024	Nacogdoches, TX	Stephen F. Austin	59–17
78	November 20, 2025	Natchitoches, LA	Stephen F. Austin	62–14
79	November 19, 2026	Nacogdoches, TX	Stephen F. Austin	66–0
Series: Northwestern State leads 45–31–3

== See also ==
- List of NCAA college football rivalry games
