= NSU Challenge =

American college football rivalry

- Nicholls Colonels Northwestern State Demons
- Sport: Football
- First meeting: October 6, 1973; Nicholls State 3, Northwestern State 0
- Latest meeting: October 24, 2026; Nicholls 31, Northwestern State 27
- Next meeting: 2027
- Trophy: NSU Trophy

Statistics
- Total meetings: 53
- All-time series: Northwestern State leads, 29–24
- Largest victory: Nicholls State, 58–0 (2007)
- Longest win streak: Northwestern State, 9 (1980–1988)
- Current win streak: Nicholls, 3 (2024–present)

Locations of Nicholls and Northwestern State

The NSU Challenge is an American college football rivalry game played annually between the Nicholls Colonels football team representing Nicholls State University and Northwestern State Demons football team representing Northwestern State University. Both universities are members of the Southland Conference. The NSU Trophy, which is a wooden trophy enscripted with NSU goes to the winning team. Although Nicholls has changed their athletic brand name from Nicholls State to Nicholls in 2018, thus not going by NSU anymore in athletics, the rivalry is still called the NSU Challenge.

== History ==
The first game in the Nicholls–Northwestern State series was played in 1973.

== Game results ==
Nicholls victories	Northwestern State victories

No.	Date	Location	Winner	Score
1	October 6, 1973	Thibodaux, LA	Nicholls State	3–0
2	October 12, 1974	Natchitoches, LA	Nicholls State	7–0
3	October 11, 1975	Thibodaux, LA	Nicholls State	23–10
4	October 9, 1976	Natchitoches, LA	Northwestern State	20–8
5	October 8, 1977	Thibodaux, LA	Nicholls State	10–6
6	October 28, 1978	Natchitoches, LA	Northwestern State	28–18
7	October 27, 1979	Thibodaux, LA	Nicholls State	27–24
8	November 8, 1980	Natchitoches, LA	Northwestern State	21–14
9	November 7, 1981	Thibodaux, LA	Northwestern State	31–17
10	November 6, 1982	Natchitoches, LA	Northwestern State	38–6
11	November 5, 1983	Thibodaux, LA	Northwestern State	24–21
12	October 11, 1984	Natchitoches, LA	Northwestern State	19–0
13	November 9, 1985	Thibodaux, LA	Northwestern State	20–14
14	November 8, 1986	Natchitoches, LA	Northwestern State	28–13
15	November 7, 1987	Thibodaux, LA	Northwestern State	31–28
16	October 15, 1988	Natchitoches, LA	Northwestern State	27–12
17	November 4, 1989	Thibodaux, LA	Nicholls State	21–15
18	September 15, 1990	Natchitoches, LA	Nicholls State	19–7
19	November 16, 1991	Thibodaux, LA	Northwestern State	16–10
20	November 14, 1992	Natchitoches, LA	Northwestern State	44–6
21	October 9, 1993	Natchitoches, LA	Northwestern State	35–21
22	September 17, 1994	Thibodaux, LA	Northwestern State	35–3
23	October 7, 1995	Natchitoches, LA	Northwestern State	34–14
24	October 12, 1996	Thibodaux, LA	Nicholls State	19–17
25	September 27, 1997	Natchitoches, LA	Northwestern State	19–0
26	October 24, 1998	Thibodaux, LA	Northwestern State	28–26
27	October 2, 1999	Natchitoches, LA	Northwestern State	42–17
28	October 14, 2000	Thibodaux, LA	Northwestern State	27–21

No.	Date	Location	Winner	Score
29	October 20, 2001	Natchitoches, LA	Northwestern State	47–14
30	October 24, 2002	Thibodaux, LA	Northwestern State	21–14
31	October 25, 2003	Natchitoches, LA	Nicholls State	40–30
32	October 21, 2004	Thibodaux, LA	Nicholls State	40–14
33	November 5, 2005	Natchitoches, LA	Nicholls State	31–24
34	October 21, 2006	Thibodaux, LA	Northwestern State	9–0
35	October 6, 2007	Thibodaux, LA	Nicholls State	58–0
36	October 11, 2008	Natchitoches, LA	Northwestern State	36–28
37	November 14, 2009	Thibodaux, LA	Nicholls State	28–21
38	November 13, 2010	Natchitoches, LA	Nicholls State	37–7
39	September 24, 2011	Thibodaux, LA	Northwestern State	34–0
40	October 27, 2012	Natchitoches, LA	Northwestern State	27–26
41	October 12, 2013	Thibodaux, LA	Nicholls State	33–21
42	November 15, 2014	Natchitoches, LA	Northwestern State	48–21
43	October 31, 2015	Thibodaux, LA	Northwestern State	37–21
44	October 29, 2016	Natchitoches, LA	Nicholls State	31–14
45	October 7, 2017	Thibodaux, LA	Nicholls State	14–10
46	October 6, 2018	Natchitoches, LA	Nicholls	28–10
47	October 12, 2019	Thibodaux, LA	Nicholls	45–35
48	March 6, 2021	Natchitoches, LA	Nicholls	31–24
49	October 30, 2021	Thibodaux, LA	Nicholls	42–21
50	October 1, 2022	Natchitoches, LA	Northwestern State	36–33
51	October 9, 2024	Thibodaux, LA	Nicholls	20–0
52	November 15, 2025	Thibodaux LA	Nicholls	26–21
53	October 24, 2026	Natchitoches, LA	Nicholls	31–27
Series: Northwestern State leads 29–24
Game scheduled for October 14, 2023, was canceled.

== See also ==
- List of NCAA college football rivalry games
