= Jazz Ferguson =

American football player (born 1997)

No. 1, 84
- Position: Wide receiver

Personal information
- Born: January 12, 1997 (age 29); St. Francisville, Louisiana, U.S.
- Listed height: 6 ft 5 in (1.96 m)
- Listed weight: 227 lb (103 kg)

Career information
- High school: West Feliciana (St. Francisville, Louisiana)
- College: LSU (2015–2016); Northwestern State (2017–2018)
- NFL draft: 2019: undrafted

Career history
- Seattle Seahawks (2019)*; Dallas Renegades (2020); DC Defenders (2023)
- * Offseason or practice squad member only
- F/FergJa04.htm Stats at Pro Football Reference

Jazmond Ja'Quan Ferguson (born January 12, 1997) is an American former professional football wide receiver. He played college football at LSU and Northwestern State, and has also played for the Seattle Seahawks of the National Football League (NFL), and the Dallas Renegades and DC Defenders of the XFL.

== Early life ==
As a junior at West Feliciana High School, Ferguson hauled in 67 catches for 1,137 yards and 12 touchdowns. As a high school senior, Ferguson recorded 889 receiving yards and 10 touchdowns, as well as 561 rushing yards and 7 rushing touchdowns. On defense, he also registered 87 tackles and 4 interceptions. He was ranked as the No. 2 wide receiver coming out of Louisiana. Ferguson also played basketball and track and field.

== College career ==
=== LSU ===
Ferguson committed to LSU as a 4-star recruit. Ferguson did not record any stats during his freshman season in 2015. In 2016, Ferguson only appeared in one game, recording 2 receptions for 17 yards.

=== Northwestern State ===
In 2017, Ferguson transferred to Northwestern State, where he did not play in his first season after transferring. In 2018, he appeared in 11 games, recording 66 receptions for 1,117 receiving yards, and 13 touchdowns. Ferguson declared for the NFL draft on December 4, 2018 and attended the NFL Combine on February 27, 2019.

== Professional career ==
Pre-draft measurables
Height	Weight	Arm length	Hand span	40-yard dash	20-yard shuttle	Three-cone drill	Vertical jump	Broad jump	Bench press
6 ft 5 in (1.96 m)	227 lb (103 kg)	34 1/4 in (0.87 m)	9 1/4 in (0.23 m)	4.45 s	4.59 s	7.25 s	37.0 in (0.94 m)	10 ft 3 in (3.12 m)	8 reps
All values from the NFL Combine

=== Seattle Seahawks ===
After going Undrafted in the 2019 NFL draft, Ferguson signed with the Seattle Seahawks on April 27, 2019. He was released on August 31, 2019, but was resigned to the practice squad the next day. He was released on September 18, 2019.

=== Dallas Renegades ===
The Dallas Renegades of the XFL selected Ferguson in their Supplemental Draft on November 22, 2019. Ferguson finished the 2020 XFL season playing in 4 games, catching 9 passes for 54 yards. He had his contract terminated when the league suspended operations in April 2020 due to the COVID-19 pandemic.

=== DC Defenders ===
After playing a small stint for The Spring League Generals in 2021, Ferguson was selected by the DC Defenders of the XFL on November 16, 2022, in the 4th Round of the Skill Position Draft. He was placed on the teams reserve list on January 25, 2023. He was activated to the active roster on March 14, 2023. Ferguson finished the 2023 XFL season playing in three games, recording one catch for 27 yards. He was waived on March 21, 2024.

== Personal life ==
Ferguson is the son of Jackie and Richard Harris, as well as the brother of former Baltimore Ravens linebacker Jaylon Ferguson, who died in 2022.
