= Glenn Gossett =

American football player and coach (1928–1995)

Biographical details
- Born: April 23, 1928; Garland County, Arkansas, U.S.
- Died: October 6, 1995 (aged 67)

Playing career

Football
- 1946–1949: Northeast Louisiana

Coaching career (HC unless noted)

Football
- 1955–1956: Homer HS (LA) (assistant)
- 1957–1958: Homer HS (LA)
- 1960: Eastern Kentucky (assistant)
- 1962–1966: SMU (assistant)
- 1967–1971: Northwestern State

Administrative career (AD unless noted)
- 1969–1972: Northwestern State

Head coaching record
- Overall: 31–14–1 (college football)

Glenn Gossett (April 23, 1928 – October 6, 1995) was an American football player and coach. He served as the head football coach at Northwestern State University in Natchitoches, Louisiana from 1967 to 1971, compiling a record of 31–14–1.

== Head coaching record ==
=== College football ===
Year	Team	Overall	Conference	Standing	Bowl/playoffs
Northwestern State Demons (Gulf States Conference) (1967–1970)
1967	Northwestern State	6–3	3–2	T–2nd	
1968	Northwestern State	5–4	2–3	T–4th	
1969	Northwestern State	7–2	4–1	2nd	
1970	Northwestern State	7–3	3–2	T–2nd	
Northwestern State Demons (NCAA College Division independent) (1971)
1971	Northwestern State	6–2–1			
Northwestern State:		31–14–1	12–8		
Total:		31–14–1			
