= Bradley Dale Peveto =

American football player and coach (born 1962)

Current position
- Title: Co-defensive coordinator
- Team: North Texas
- Conference: American

Biographical details
- Born: December 28, 1962 (age 63); Beaumont, Texas, U.S.

Playing career
- 1982–1986: SMU
- Position: Defensive back

Coaching career (HC unless noted)
- 1987: Trinity Valley (S)
- 1988–1991: Stephen F. Austin (DL/LB/ST)
- 1992–1993: Southern Miss (LB/ST)
- 1994–1995: Arkansas (LB/ST)
- 1996–1998: Northwestern State (DC/LB)
- 1999–2000: Houston (AHC/DB)
- 2001–2002: Houston (co-DC)
- 2003: Middle Tennessee (DB)
- 2004: Middle Tennessee (DC/LB)
- 2005–2007: LSU (ST/LB)
- 2008: LSU (co-DC/LB)
- 2009–2012: Northwestern State
- 2013: Kentucky (S/STC)
- 2014–2016: LSU (ST/DA)
- 2017: Ole Miss (LB/ST)
- 2018–2019: Texas A&M (LB/ST)
- 2021–2023: UTEP (DC/LB)
- 2024–2025: Texas State (co-DC/LB)
- 2026–present: North Texas (co-DC/LB)

Head coaching record
- Overall: 14–30

Bradley Dale Peveto (born December 28, 1962) is an American football coach. He is a co-defensive coordinator and the linebackers coach at University of North Texas and was previously the defensive coordinator at the University of Texas at El Paso (UTEP) from 2021 through 2023. Peveto served as the head football coach at Northwestern State University in Natchitoches, Louisiana from 2009 to 2012, compiling a record of 14–30.

== Early life and playing career ==
Peveto grew up in the small town of Orangefield, Texas where he ran track and played football. He attended Southern Methodist University (SMU), where he played defensive back from 1982 to 1986.

== Coaching career ==
=== Early coaching career ===
Peveto started his coaching career as the secondary coach at Trinity Valley Community College in 1987. From Trinity Valley, Peveto served as an assistant coach at Stephen F. Austin, Southern Miss, Arkansas, Northwestern State, Houston, Middle Tennessee before being hired at LSU in 2005. As part of the LSU staff, he coached the special teams and linebackers from 2005 through 2007, including the 2007 national championship team. In 2008, he was promoted to co-defensive coordinator of the Tigers, and served for one year before taking the head coaching position at Northwestern State.

=== Head coach at Northwestern State ===
On December 18, 2008, Peveto was hired as he head football coach at Northwestern State. After a winless 2009 season, Peveto led the Demons to consecutive 5–6 seasons. On November 19, 2012, Peveto was fired as head coach of the Demons after their 4–7 season. During his tenure at Northwestern State, he compiled an overall record of 14–30.

== Head coaching record ==
Year	Team	Overall	Conference	Standing	Bowl/playoffs
Northwestern State Demons (Southland Conference) (2009–2012)
2009	Northwestern State	0–11	0–7	8th	
2010	Northwestern State	5–6	4–3	T–3rd	
2011	Northwestern State	5–6	3–4	5th	
2012	Northwestern State	4–7	2–5	6th	
Northwestern State:		14–30	9–19		
Total:		14–30			
