= Jack Clayton (American football) =

American football, basketball, and baseball coach (1915–1997)

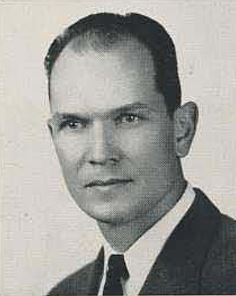
- Clayton in 1953

Biographical details
- Born: January 4, 1915
- Died: January 26, 1997 (aged 82); Shreveport, Louisiana, U.S.

Coaching career (HC unless noted)

Football
- c. 1940: Bossier HS (LA)
- 1947: Western Kentucky (assistant)
- 1948–1956: Western Kentucky
- 1957–1966: Northwestern State

Basketball
- 1946–1947: Centenary

Baseball
- 1967–1968: Northwestern State

Head coaching record
- Overall: 108–68–4 (college football); 16–7 (college basketball); 42–22–3 (college baseball)
- Bowls: 1–0

Accomplishments and honors

Championships
- Football; OVC (1952); 4 Gulf States (1957, 1958, 1962, 1966)

Jack H. Clayton (January 4, 1915 – January 26, 1997) was an American football, basketball, and baseball coach. He served as the head men's basketball coach at Centenary College of Louisiana during the 1946–1947 before moving to Bowling Green, Kentucky to become the head football coach at Western Kentucky State College from 1948 to 1956. Clayton later became the head football coach (1957–1966) and head baseball coach (1967–1968) at Northwestern State University in Natchitoches, Louisiana.

A native of Haughton, Louisiana, Clayton died of congestive heart failure, on January 26, 1997, at Willis-Knighton Hospital in Shreveport, Louisiana.

== Head coaching record ==
=== College football ===
Year	Team	Overall	Conference	Standing	Bowl/playoffs
Western Kentucky Hilltoppers (Ohio Valley Conference) (1948–1956)
1948	Western Kentucky	5–4	2–3	5th	
1949	Western Kentucky	5–4	2–3	6th	
1950	Western Kentucky	6–2–2	3–1–2	2nd	
1951	Western Kentucky	4–5	2–4	6th	
1952	Western Kentucky	9–1	4–1	T–1st	W Refrigerator
1953	Western Kentucky	6–4	2–3	4th	
1954	Western Kentucky	7–3	3–2	T–2nd	
1955	Western Kentucky	3–6	1–4	5th	
1956	Western Kentucky	5–4	2–3	T–3rd	
Western Kentucky:		50–33–2	21–24–2		
Northwestern State Demons (Gulf States Conference) (1957–1966)
1957	Northwestern State	7–2	4–1	T–1st	
1958	Northwestern State	8–2	4–1	T–1st	
1959	Northwestern State	4–5–1	2–3	T–3rd	
1960	Northwestern State	3–6	0–5	6th	
1961	Northwestern State	7–3	3–2	T–3rd	
1962	Northwestern State	7–2–1	4–1	1st	
1963	Northwestern State	4–6	2–3	4th	
1964	Northwestern State	4–5	1–4	5th	
1965	Northwestern State	5–4	2–3	T–4th	
1966	Northwestern State	9–0	5–0	1st	
Northwestern State:		58–35–2	27–23		
Total:		108–68–4			
National championship Conference title Conference division title or championship game berth
