= Scott Stoker =

American college football coach and former quarterback

Current position
- Title: Inside linebackers coach
- Team: Louisiana
- Conference: Sun Belt

Playing career
- 1987–1989: Northwestern State
- Position: Quarterback

Coaching career (HC unless noted)
- 1994–1998: McNeese State (LB)
- 1999: McNeese State (OC)
- 2000–2001: McNeese State (DC)
- 2002–2008: Northwestern State
- 2009–2012: Sam Houston State (DC)
- 2013–2015: UTEP (DC/LB)
- 2016–2019: Louisiana–Monroe (LB)
- 2020: Louisiana–Monroe (interim DC/LB)
- 2022: Tarleton State (OLB)
- 2023: Tarleton State (S)
- 2024–present: Louisiana (ILB)

Head coaching record
- Overall: 44–37
- Tournaments: 0–2 (NCAA D-I-AA playoffs)

Accomplishments and honors

Championships
- 1 SLC (2004)

Scott Stoker is an American college football coach and former player. He is the inside linebackers coach for the University of Louisiana at Lafayette, a position he has held since 2024. He was the head football coach at Northwestern State University from 2002 to 2008, compiling a record of 44–37 in seven seasons.

Stoker also coached for Tarleton State University.

== Head coaching record ==
Year	Team	Overall	Conference	Standing	Bowl/playoffs
Northwestern State Demons (Southland Conference) (2002–2008)
2002	Northwestern State	9–4	4–2	2nd	L NCAA Division I-AA First Round
2003	Northwestern State	7–5	2–3	T–3rd	
2004	Northwestern State	8–4	4–1	T–1st	L NCAA Division I-AA First Round
2005	Northwestern State	5–5	3–3	T–3rd	
2006	Northwestern State	4–7	2–4	T–5th	
2007	Northwestern State	4–7	3–4	T–4th	
2008	Northwestern State	7–5	4–3	T–3rd	
Northwestern State:		44–37	22–20		
Total:		44–37			
