= Harry Turpin =

American football coach and administrator (1902–1974)

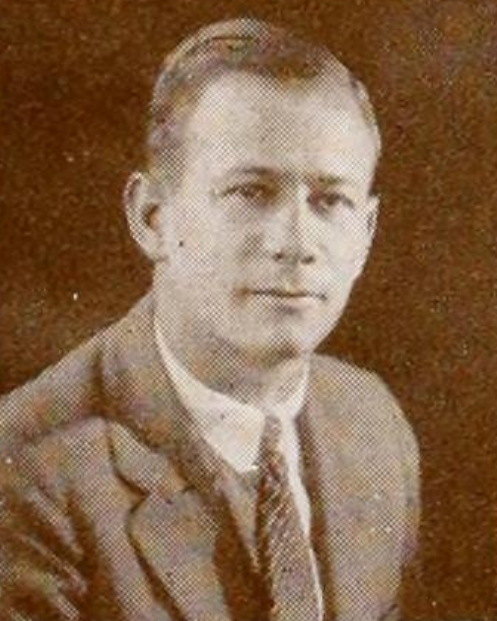
- Turpin pictured in Potpourri 1926, Louisiana Normal yearbook

Biographical details
- Born: May 10, 1902; Tensas Parish, Louisiana, U.S.
- Died: December 26, 1974 (aged 72); Natchitoches, Louisiana, U.S.

Playing career

Football
- 1921: Tulane
- 1922–1925: Louisiana Normal

Baseball
- 1923: Louisiana Normal
- 1925–1926: Louisiana Normal

Track and field
- 1925–1926: Louisiana Normal
- Position: Quarterback (football)

Coaching career (HC unless noted)
- 1926–1933: Louisiana Normal (assistant)
- 1934–1956: Louisiana Normal / Northwestern State

Administrative career (AD unless noted)
- 1951–1957: Northwestern State

Head coaching record
- Overall: 100–91–11

Accomplishments and honors

Championships
- 2 LIC (1939, 1942); 1 SIAA (1939); 1 GSC (1953)

Awards
- GSC Coach of the Year (1953)

Harry Hutton "Rags" Turpin (May 10, 1902 – December 26, 1974) was an American college football coach and athletics administrator. He served as the head football coach at his alma mater, Northwestern State University in Natchitoches, Louisiana, from 1934 to 1956, compiling a record of 100–91–11. Turpin was also the athletic director at Northwestern State from 1951 to 1957.

Turpin began his playing career in 1921 to Tulane University in New Orleans, Louisiana in 1921. After transferring to Louisiana State Normal School—as Northwestern State University was known as the time—he letteed in football, baseball, and track and field.

Turpin died on December 26, 1974, at a nursing home in Natchitoches.

== Head coaching record ==
Year	Team	Overall	Conference	Standing	Bowl/playoffs
Louisiana Normal Demons (Southern Intercollegiate Athletic Association) (1934–1938)
1934	Louisiana Normal	4–3–1	3–2	T–14th	
1935	Louisiana Normal	2–9	1–5	29th	
1936	Louisiana Normal	5–4–1	3–2–1	17th	
1937	Louisiana Normal	4–4–1	3–1–1	T–8th	
1938	Louisiana Normal	5–5	3–3	17th	
Louisiana Normal Demons (Louisiana Intercollegiate Conference / Southern Intercollegiate Athletic Association) (1939–1941)
1939	Louisiana Normal	11–0	4–0 / 7–0	1st / 1st	
1940	Louisiana Normal	6–3–1	3–1–1 / 4–1–1	2nd / T–4th	
1941	Louisiana Normal	4–3–1	2–2–1 / 3–3–1	3rd / T–14th	
Louisiana Normal / Northwestern State Demons (Louisiana Intercollegiate Conference) (1942–1947)
1942	Louisiana Normal	6–2	3–0	1st	
1943	No team—World War II				
1944	Louisiana Normal	2–4–1	0–3–1	3rd	
1945	Northwestern State	2–6–1	1–2–1	3rd	
1946	Northwestern State	4–6	1–3	4th	
1947	Northwestern State	4–5	3–2	3rd	
Northwestern State Demons (Gulf States Conference) (1948–1954)
1948	Northwestern State	5–3–1	2–3	4th	
1949	Northwestern State	5–4	1–4	5th	
1950	Northwestern State	6–4	2–3	T–4th	
1951	Northwestern State	1–8	0–5	6th	
1952	Northwestern State	1–7–1	0–4–1	T–5th	
1953	Northwestern State	6–2	5–1	T–1st	
1954	Northwestern State	7–2	4–2	T–2nd	
1955	Northwestern State	4–5	2–4	5th	
1956	Northwestern State	6–2–2	3–1–1	T–2nd	
Louisiana Normal / Northwestern State:		100–91–11	55–54–8		
Total:		100–91–11			
National championship Conference title Conference division title or championship game berth
