= George Doherty =

American football player, coach, and administrator (1920–1987)

- Doherty, c. 1967

No. 38, 33, 44
- Positions: Guard, tackle

Personal information
- Born: September 5, 1920; Camden, Mississippi, U.S.
- Died: December 31, 1987 (aged 67); Natchitoches, Louisiana, U.S.
- Listed height: 6 ft 1 in (1.85 m)
- Listed weight: 218 lb (99 kg)

Career information
- High school: Canton (Canton, Mississippi)
- College: Louisiana Tech
- NFL draft: 1944: 20th round, 199th overall pick

Career history

Playing
- Brooklyn Tigers (1944); Boston Yanks (1945); New York Yankees (1946); Buffalo Bison / Bills (1946-1947)

Coaching
- Louisiana Tech (1958–1966) Assistant; Northwestern State (1967–1971) Assistant; Northwestern State (1972–1974) Head coach

Operations
- Northwestern State (1972–1978) Athletic director

Career NFL/AAFC statistics
- Games played: 43
- Games started: 29
- Stats at Pro Football Reference

George Edward Doherty (September 5, 1920 – December 31, 1987) was an American football player, coach, and college athletics administrator.

== Early life ==
Doherty was born in Camden, Mississippi, in 1920 and attended Canton High School in Canton, Mississippi. He played college football at Louisiana Tech University. During World War II, he served in the military.

== Playing career ==
Doherty played professional football as a Guard and tackle in the National Football League (NFL) for the Brooklyn Tigers in 1944 and the Boston Yanks in 1945. He then jumped to the All-America Football Conference (AFFC), playing for the Buffalo Bisons and New York Yankees in 1946 and for the Buffalo Bills in 1947. He appeared in 43 professional football games, 29 of them as a starter.

== Coaching career ==
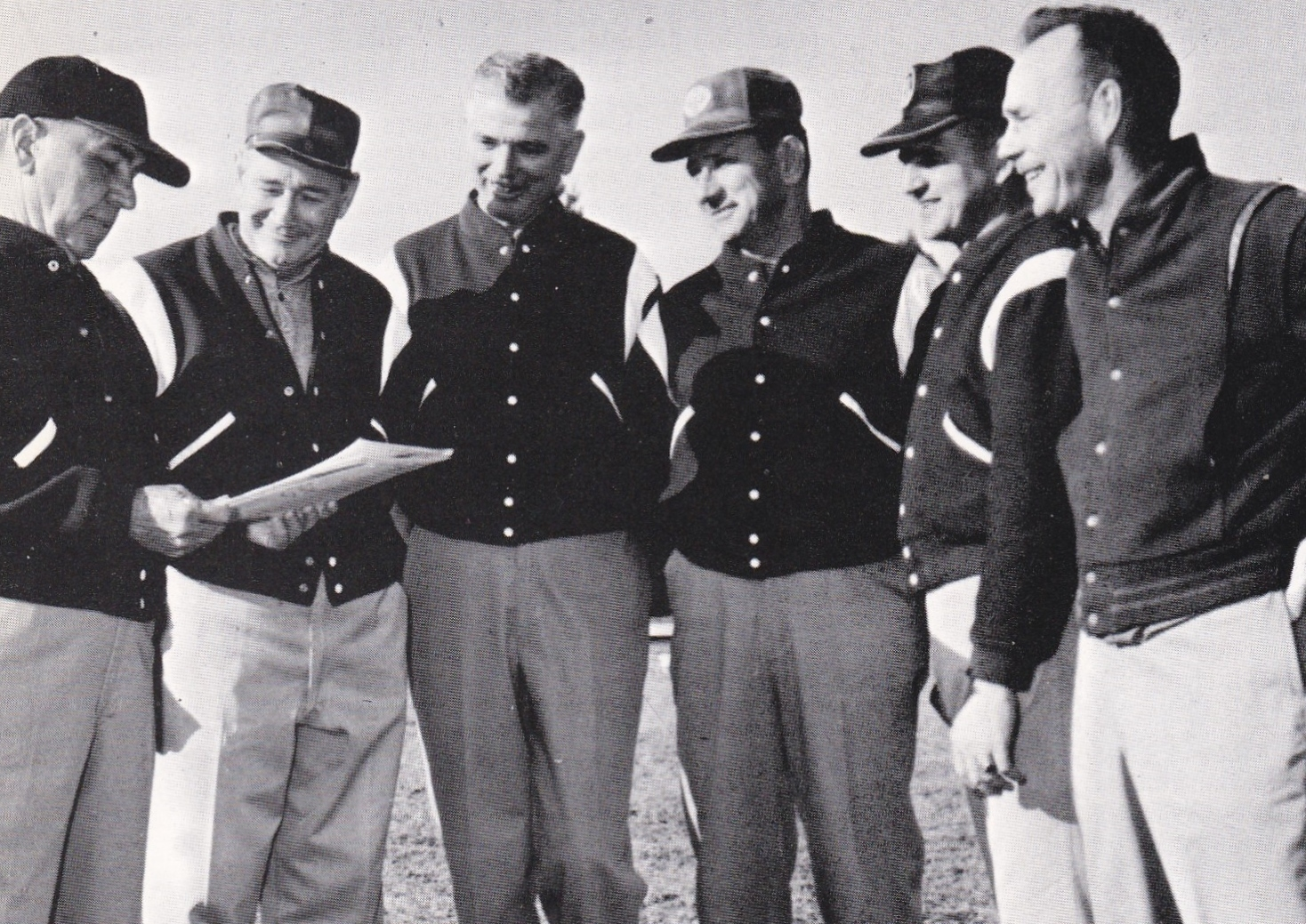
1966 Louisiana Tech University football coaches: from left, head coach Joe Aillet and assistants George Doherty, Jim Mize, A. Huey Williamson, E. J. Lewis, and Lee Hedges

Doherty served as an assistant football coach at Louisiana Tech (1958–1966) and Northwestern State University (1967–1971). He became the head coach at Northwestern State in 1972 and held that post through the 1974 season, compiling a record of 15–17 in three seasons.

== Later life ==
Doherty died of a heart attack in 1987 in Natchitoches, Louisiana.

== Head coaching record ==
Year	Team	Overall	Conference	Standing	Bowl/playoffs
Northwestern State Demons (Gulf South Conference) (1972–1974)
1972	Northwestern State	8–2	6–0	1st	
1973	Northwestern State	6–5	3–4	T–6th	
1974	Northwestern State	1–10	1–6	8th	
Northwestern State:		15–17	10–10		
Total:		15–17			
National championship Conference title Conference division title or championship game berth
