= Northwestern State Demons football =

Intercollegiate American football team

2026 Northwestern State Demons football team
- First season: 1907; 119 years ago
- Athletic director: Kevin Bostian
- Head coach: Blaine McCorkle; 3rd season, 1–23 (.042)
- Location: Natchitoches, Louisiana
- Stadium: Harry Turpin Stadium (capacity: 15,971)
- NCAA division: Division I FCS
- Conference: Southland
- Colors: Purple, white, and orange trim
- All-time record: 632–409–40 (.603)

Conference championships
- SIAA: 1939 Gulf States: 1953, 1957, 1958, 1962, 1966, 1972 Gulf Star: 1984 SLC: 1988, 1997, 1998, 2004
- Rivalries: McNeese State (rivalry); Nicholls (rivalry); Southeastern Louisiana (rivalry); Louisiana Tech (rivalry); Louisiana–Monroe (rivalry); Stephen F. Austin (rivalry)
- Fight song: Northwestern Fight
- Mascot: Vic the Demon
- Marching band: Spirit of Northwestern
- Website: NSUDemons.com

The Northwestern State Demons football program is the intercollegiate American football team for Northwestern State University located in the U.S. state of Louisiana. The team competes in the NCAA Division I Football Championship Subdivision (FCS) and is a member of the Southland Conference. Northwestern State's first football team was fielded in 1907. The team plays its home games at the 15,971 seat Harry Turpin Stadium in Natchitoches, Louisiana.

== History ==
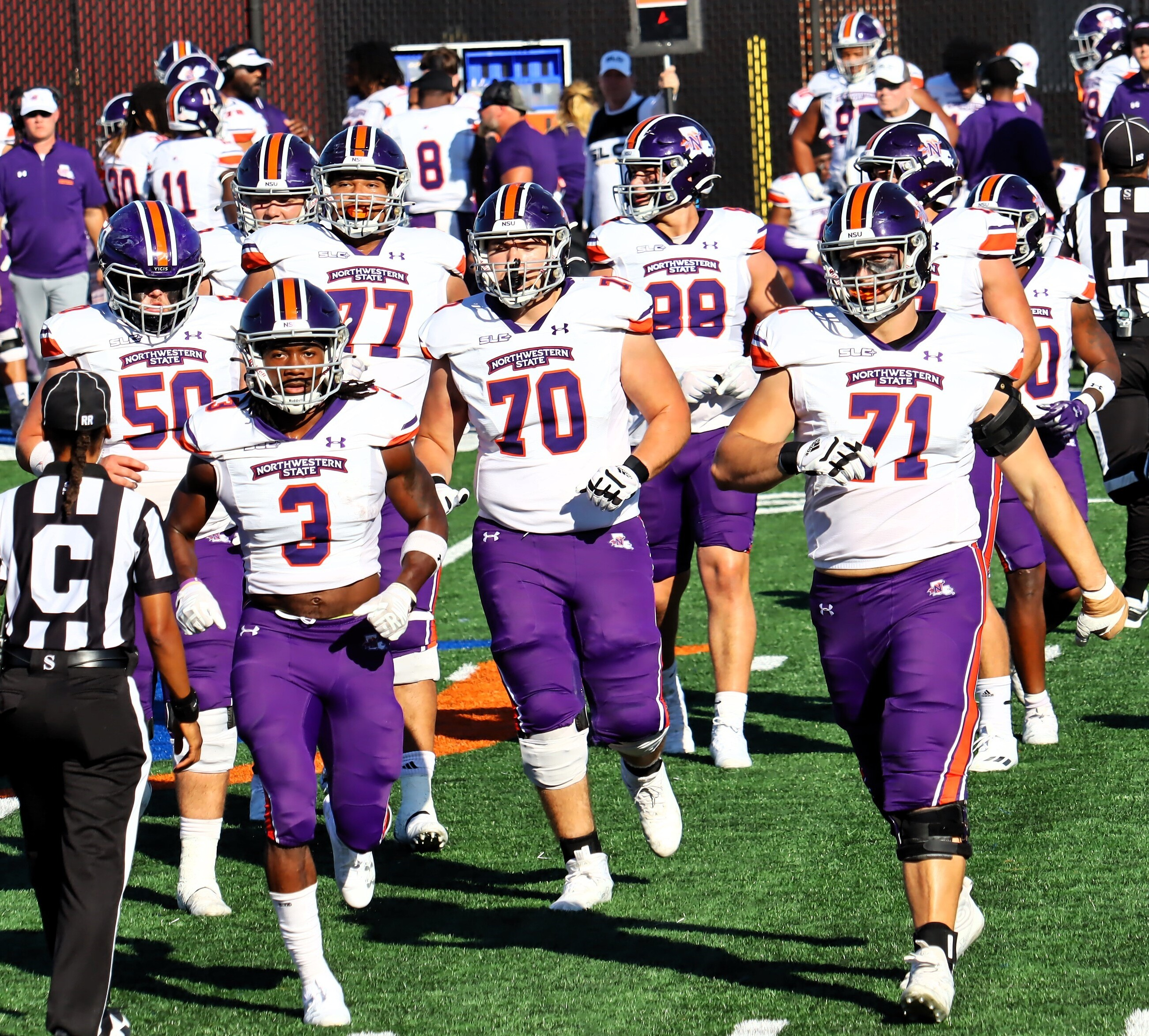
Demons football players during a 2024 game at Husky Stadium in Houston

Northwestern State football has the distinction of being the only NCAA division IAA/FCS member to have 2 NFL rookies of the year. In 1981, Joe Delaney, running back for the Kansas City Chiefs, was awarded the AFC Rookie of the year by UPI. In 1988, John Stephens, running back for the New England Patriots, was named Offensive/AFC Rookie of the year.

== Conference affiliations ==
- Independent (1907–1913, 1926–1927, 1971, 1976–1977)
- Louisiana Intercollegiate Athletic Association (1914–1925)
- SIAA (1928–1941)
- Louisiana Intercollegiate Conference (1942–1947)
- Gulf States Conference (1948–1970)
- Gulf South Conference (1972–1974)
- Division II Independent (1975)
- Division I-AA Independent (1978–1983)
- Gulf Star Conference (1984–1986)
- Southland Conference (1987–present)

== Championships ==
=== Conference championships ===
Northwestern State has 12 conference championships.

Year	Conference	Coach	Overall record	Conference record
1939	Southern Intercollegiate Athletic Association	Harry Turpin	11–0	7–0
1953†	Gulf States Conference	Harry Turpin	6–2	5–1
1957	Gulf States Conference	Jack Clayton	7–2	4–1
1958	Gulf States Conference	Jack Clayton	8–2	4–1
1962	Gulf States Conference	Jack Clayton	7–2–1	4–1
1966	Gulf States Conference	Jack Clayton	9–0	5–0
1972	Gulf States Conference	George Doherty	8–2	6–0
1984†	Gulf Star Conference	Sam Goodwin	7–4	4–1
1988	Southland Conference	Sam Goodwin	10–3	6–0
1997†	Southland Conference	Sam Goodwin	8–4	6–1
1998	Southland Conference	Sam Goodwin	11–3	6–1
2004†	Southland Conference	Scott Stoker	8–4	4–1

† Co-champions

== Division I-AA/FCS Playoffs results ==
The Demons have appeared in the I-AA/FCS playoffs six times with an overall record of 3–6.

Year	Round	Opponent	Result
1988	First Round; Quarterfinals	Boise State; Idaho	W 22–13; L 30–38
1997	First Round	Eastern Washington	L 10–40
1998	First Round; Quarterfinals; Semifinals	Illinois State; Appalachian State; Massachusetts	W 48–28; W 31–20; L 31–41
2001	First Round	Montana	L 19–28
2002	First Round	Montana	L 14–45
2004	First Round	Montana	L 7–56

== Rivalries ==
=== McNeese State ===
McNeese State leads the series 45–22–1 through the 2018 season.

=== Nicholls ===
Northwestern State leads the series with Nicholls 28–18 through the 2018 season.

=== Southeastern Louisiana ===
Southeastern Louisiana leads the series 28–22 through the 2018 season.

=== Stephen F. Austin ===
Battle for Chief Caddo

Each season, Stephen F. Austin State University of Nacogdoches, Texas and Northwestern State play for the country's largest football trophy. In 1961, longtime rivals SFA and Northwestern State decided to award the winner of the game a trophy, the game was won by Northwestern State University. According to the stipulations of that particular match, the loser would have to present the winner with a tree chopped down from a nearby forest.

In March 1962, the Lumberjacks of SFA in Nacogdoches, Texas, presented NSU with a black gum tree trunk from the SFA campus from which a statue was to be carved. The black gum tree weighed over a ton and was thirty inches in diameter. An Indian statue, Chief Caddo, was chosen because of the historic founding of Natchitoches, Louisiana and Nacogdoches, Texas by Indian tribes. Natchitoches means chinquapin eaters and Nacogdoches means persimmon eaters. It was carved by Harold Greene in Logansport and required over 200 hours of labor. The name “Chief Indian Caddo” was selected in honor of the ancient federation of Caddo Indian tribes, which once inhabited the northern Louisiana area. The final painting of the statue was done at Northwestern. The finished product stands around 7.6 feet tall and weighs about 320 pounds. The first game for Chief Caddo was September 15, 1962. Northwestern won 23–6. Tradition has it that the winner of the annual NSU and SFA football game keeps Chief Caddo on their respective campus. Currently, Chief Caddo is the largest college football trophy in the nation.

=== Louisiana–Monroe ===
In the 1992 edition of the rivalry game, the teams' mascots Vic the Demon and Chief Brave Spirit got involved in a fight that distracted television cameras to the point that the entire altercation is caught on video. In the scuffle, Vic the Demon's head is ripped off as the two crashed to the ground behind one of the end zones, which according to the video clip breaks a "cardinal rule" of being a mascot. The melee was broken up by college police without further incident. The game was last played in 2005. Northwestern State leads the series with Louisiana–Monroe 28–19–1.

== Notable former players ==
Notable alumni include:

- Demetress Bell - Buffalo Bills and Philadelphia Eagles
- Mark Duper – Miami Dolphins
- Ed Eagan - Buffalo Bills and New York Giants
- Shelton Eppler - Aalborg 89ers, Fundidores de Monterrey, Vienna Vikings.
- Jermaine Jones - New York Jets, Chicago Bears, Dallas Cowboys
- Joe Delaney – Inductee of College Football Hall of Fame - Kansas City Chiefs
- Al Edwards - Buffalo Bills
- Mike Green - Chicago Bears, Seattle Seahawks, Washington Redskins
- Adrian Hardy - San Francisco 49ers and Cincinnati Bengals
- Bobby Hebert – New Orleans Saints and Atlanta Falcons
- Jamall Johnson - BC Lions and Hamilton Tiger Cats
- Jeremy Lane – Seattle Seahawks
- Monte Ledbetter – Houston Oilers, Buffalo Bills, Atlanta Falcons
- Terrence McGee - Buffalo Bills
- Craig Nall - Green Bay Packers, Buffalo Bills, Houston Texans
- Ed Orgeron – former LSU Tigers Head Coach
- Petey Perot - Philadelphia Eagles and New Orleans Saints
- David Pittman - Baltimore Ravens
- T-Dre Player – BC Lions
- Gary Reasons – Inductee of College Football Hall of Fame - New York Giants and Cincinnati Bengals
- Barry Rubin (born 1957) - Head Strength and Conditioning Coach of the Kansas City Chiefs in the National Football League
- Deon Simon - New York Jets
- Jackie Smith - Inductee of Pro Football Hall of Fame - St. Louis Cardinals and Dallas Cowboys
- Marcus Spears - Chicago Bears, Kansas City Chiefs, Houston Texans
- John Stephens – New England Patriots
- Keith Thibodeaux - Washington Redskins, Minnesota Vikings, Green Bay Packers
- Sidney Thornton - Pittsburgh Steelers
- Charlie Tolar - Houston Oilers
- Floyd Turner - New Orleans Saints, Indianapolis Colts, Baltimore Ravens
- Odessa Turner - New York Giants and San Francisco 49ers
- Kenny Wright - Minnesota Vikings, Houston Texans, Jacksonville Jaguars, Washington Redskins

== Future non-conference opponents ==
Announced non-conference opponents as of September 9, 2026.

2026	2027	2028
Louisiana Christian	at LSU	at TCU
at Louisiana Tech	at Hawaii	Central Arkansas
at Weber State	at Central Arkansas	

== See also ==
- List of NCAA Division I FCS football programs
