= Sports in Texas =

The US state of Texas in the Southern United States region is home to several professional and amateur sports teams. This includes 12 teams in major professional leagues, 3 in prominent women's leagues, several in minor leagues, and collegiate programs for 25 National Collegiate Athletic Association (NCAA) Division I universities.

== Major professional league teams ==
Locations of notable teams in Texas

=== Major professional league teams ===
The following teams compete in a major professional league.

Club	Sport	Founded (Note: Year team began play in Texas)	League	Venue (capacity)	Championships
Austin FC	Soccer	2018	Major League Soccer	Q2 Stadium (20,500)	0
Dallas Cowboys	Football	1960	National Football League	AT&T Stadium (80,000)	5
Dallas Mavericks	Basketball	1980	National Basketball Association	American Airlines Center (19,200)	1
Dallas Stars	Ice hockey	1993	National Hockey League	American Airlines Center (18,532)	1
FC Dallas	Soccer	1995	Major League Soccer	Toyota Stadium (20,500)	0
Houston Astros	Baseball	1962	Major League Baseball	Daikin Park (41,168)	2
Houston Dynamo FC	Soccer	2006	Major League Soccer	Shell Energy Stadium (22,039)	2
Houston Rockets	Basketball	1971	National Basketball Association	Toyota Center (18,055)	2
Houston Texans	Football	2002	National Football League	Reliant Stadium (71,795)	0
San Antonio Spurs	Basketball	1967	National Basketball Association	Frost Bank Center (18,418)	5
Texas Rangers	Baseball	1972	Major League Baseball	Globe Life Field (40,000)	1

== Other highest-level professional league teams ==
The following teams compete in a highest-level professional league.

Dallas Wings	Basketball	2016	Women's National Basketball Association	College Park Center (7,000)	3
Houston Dash	Soccer	2014	National Women's Soccer League	Shell Energy Stadium (7,000) (Note: Artificially reduced capacity.)	0
Dallas Trinity FC	Soccer	2024	USL Super League	Cotton Bowl (92,100)	0
Texas Super Kings	Cricket	2023	Major League Cricket	Grand Prairie Stadium (7,000)	0

== American football ==
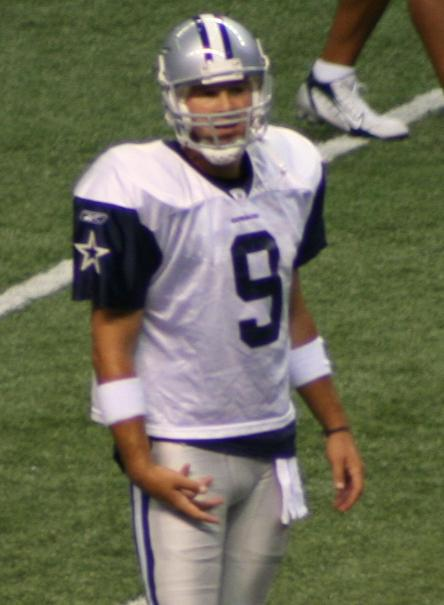
Tony Romo, former quarterback of the Dallas Cowboys

Many Texans are passionate about American football and intensely follow high school and college football teams, which often dominate social and leisure activity. Professional football is also intensely popular in Texas, and the state is home to two National Football League (NFL) franchises, the Dallas Cowboys and Houston Texans. In addition to the Cowboys and Texans, two current NFL teams previously played in the state, and one now-defunct NFL team also called the state home.

The Dallas Cowboys, founded in 1960, are one of the most popular teams in the league and have fans in many parts of the United States, leading to the nickname "America's Team". They are also one of the most successful, having reached eight Super Bowls and won five (tied with the San Francisco 49ers for second all-time). The Cowboys play their home games at AT&T Stadium in nearby Arlington, into which they moved in 2009 after having spent 38 years at Texas Stadium in Irving.

The first major-league sports team in Texas was also an NFL franchise—the Dallas Texans, which joined the league in 1952. The team's first game, however, proved to be a harbinger for the season—a 24–6 loss in front of fewer than 18,000 fans in the then-75,000-seat Cotton Bowl. Home attendance continued to slump, dropping to 10,000 for a loss that left the team 0–7. The team owners, unable to make payroll, returned the Texans to the league, and the team played the rest of the 1952 season as a traveling team, never returning to Texas. After the season, the NFL folded the Texans, making them the last NFL team to permanently cease operations.

In the same year that the Cowboys entered the NFL, the American Football League (AFL) began operations with two teams in the state—the Dallas Texans and Houston Oilers. The new Texans shared the Cotton Bowl with the Cowboys, while the Oilers played at Jeppesen Stadium (now the site of the University of Houston's TDECU Stadium). The Texans and Cowboys shared the city and stadium through the 1962 season; while the Texans enjoyed more on-field success, including an AFL title in 1962, the team's owner Lamar Hunt concluded that Dallas could not support two professional football teams and moved the Texans to Kansas City, Missouri, where they play to this day as the Kansas City Chiefs. The Oilers moved from Jeppesen Stadium to the larger Rice Stadium after the 1964 season, and then joined baseball's Houston Astros at the Astrodome in 1968. Two years later, the merger that the AFL and NFL had agreed to in 1966 took effect, with all AFL franchises being incorporated into the NFL. The Oilers remained at the Astrodome into the 1990s, but the failure of team owner Bud Adams to reach an agreement with the city on a new stadium led to his moving the franchise to Nashville, Tennessee, where it was renamed the Tennessee Titans.

The NFL returned to Houston in 2002 with the debut of the current Texans, who play their home games at Reliant Stadium, the first NFL stadium with a retractable roof.

In 2020, the Dallas Renegades and Houston Roughnecks launched as inaugural teams in the new XFL. The XFL's first season was cut short by COVID-19, and the league did not resume play until 2023, with both teams returning. Shortly before play resumed, the Renegades changed their geographic identifier to Arlington. In the meantime, the second USFL started play in 2022, with the Houston Gamblers as one of its eight original teams. After both leagues' 2023 seasons, the USFL and XFL merged to form the current United Football League. The Renegades were one of the four XFL teams brought into the new league, while the Gamblers and Roughnecks merged, maintaining the Roughnecks branding but retaining the player rights and coaching staff of the Gamblers. After the 2025 season, the Renegades changed their geographic identifier back to Dallas, and the Roughnecks rebranded as the Gamblers.

== Baseball ==
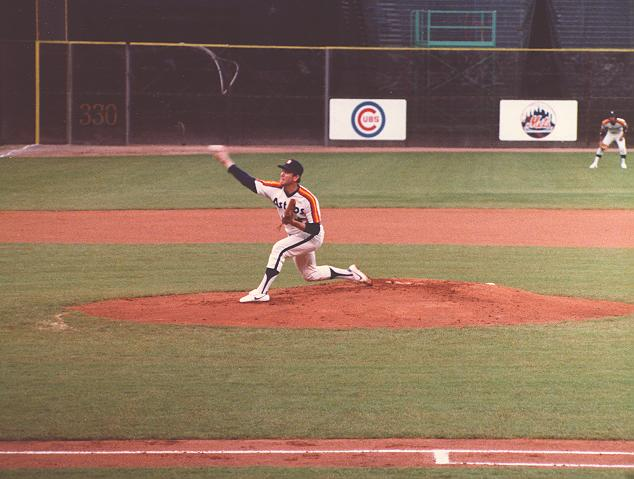
Nolan Ryan has pitched for both the Astros and Rangers.

Baseball has a strong presence in Texas, with two Major League Baseball (MLB) teams. The Houston Astros (originally the "Colt .45s") started playing in 1962. The Texas Rangers debuted in 1972 after relocating from Washington, D.C. In 2005, the Astros became the first team in Texas to make it to the World Series. The Rangers followed the Astros in 2010 to their first World Series and the following year as well. In 2017, the Astros became the first team in Texas to win the World Series. In 2023, the Rangers also won their first World Series title.

Minor League Baseball (MiLB) is also closely followed in Texas—especially in the smaller metropolitan areas. As of the 2026 season, three teams play in the Triple-A Pacific Coast League: the El Paso Chihuahuas, Round Rock Express, and Sugar Land Space Cowboys. Five teams play in the Double-A Texas League: the Amarillo Sod Poodles, Corpus Christi Hooks, Frisco RoughRiders, Midland RockHounds, and San Antonio Missions. The Fort Worth Cats were a team in Fort Worth that won three-straight championships in independent leagues, one in the Central Baseball League and the last two in the American Association.

College baseball is also quite popular, as Texas A&M University, Rice University, University of Texas at Austin, University of Houston, Baylor University, Texas Tech University, and Texas Christian University have all made multiple Men's College World Series appearances.

== Basketball ==
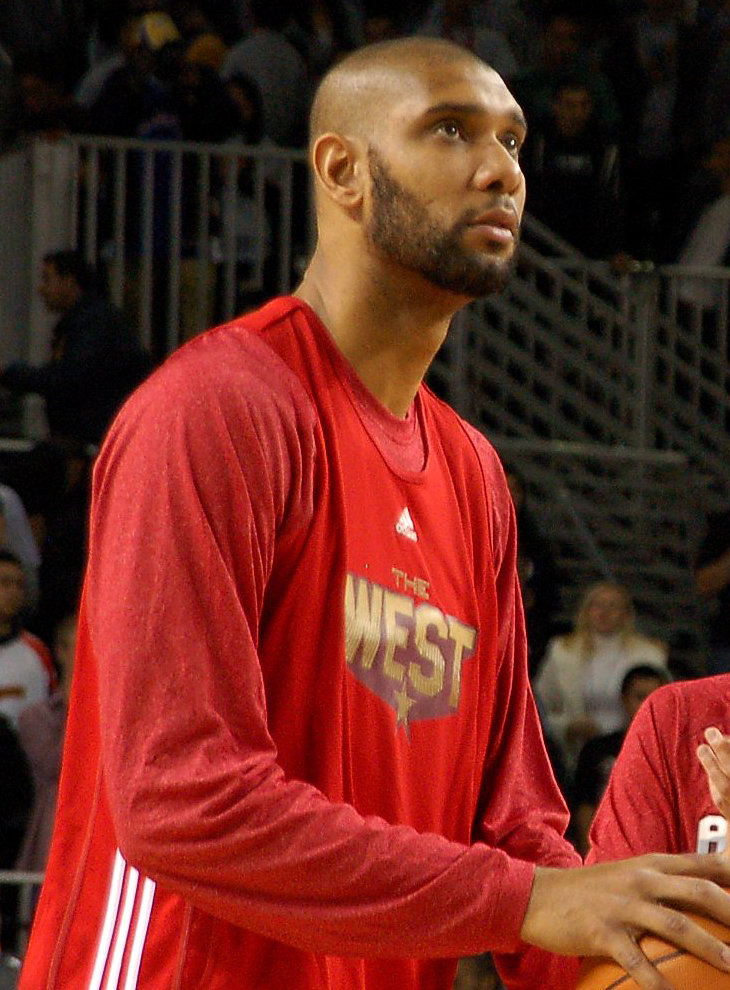
Tim Duncan, a five time NBA champion with the San Antonio Spurs.

Basketball is also popular, and Texas hosts three NBA teams: the San Antonio Spurs, the Houston Rockets, and the Dallas Mavericks. All three have won championships, with the Rockets winning back-to-back championships in 1994 and 1995 with the help of NBA MVP Hakeem Olajuwon. Following this, the Spurs enjoyed a period of consistent success, winning 5 championships between 1999 and 2014 with the help of Tim Duncan, Tony Parker, and Manu Ginóbili. The Dallas Mavericks enjoyed a similarly successful period after trading the Milwaukee Bucks for Dirk Nowitzki. They managed to break through and win a championship in 2011.

Texas is home to one WNBA team, the Dallas Wings, which relocated from Tulsa, Oklahoma after the 2015 season. The state had two other WNBA teams, the Houston Comets and San Antonio Stars. The Comets, a founding member of the WNBA, won the league's first four championships (1997–2000) but folded after the 2008 season. The Stars were also a founding member of the WNBA as the Salt Lake City-based Utah Starzz, and moved to San Antonio when the team was bought by the Spurs' parent company, Spurs Sports & Entertainment (SSE), before the 2003 season. The team then took the identity of San Antonio Silver Stars, dropping the word "Silver" after the 2013 season. After the 2017 season, SSE sold the Stars to MGM Resorts International, which moved the team to Las Vegas as the Las Vegas Aces.

At the collegiate level, the state is home to two NCAA Division I Men's Championship teams: the Texas Western Miners (now UTEP Miners) team, who won the 1966 NCAA University Division basketball tournament (the historic predecessor to today's Division I men's tournament), and the Baylor Bears, who won the 2021 NCAA Division I men's basketball tournament. In women's collegiate basketball, several teams have won championships, including the Texas Tech Lady Raiders, Texas Longhorns, Texas A&M Aggies, and Baylor Bears.

Texas also has a statewide championship recreational basketball league, Shamrock Basketball Association.

== Horse racing ==
From 1905 to 1915, people in Dallas and Fort Worth turned out by the thousands for horse racing, which was usually tied to the state fair schedule. Dallas established a Jockey Club early on. The Fort Worth Driving Club (for owners of Standardbred trotters and pacers) had 101 members when it opened in 1905. Trotters raced at a park in Fort Worth, but both cities attracted thousands of people for each style of racing.

Lone Star Park, in the Dallas–Fort Worth suburb of Grand Prairie, hosted the Breeders' Cup, the climax to the American Thoroughbred racing season, in 2004.

== Ice hockey ==
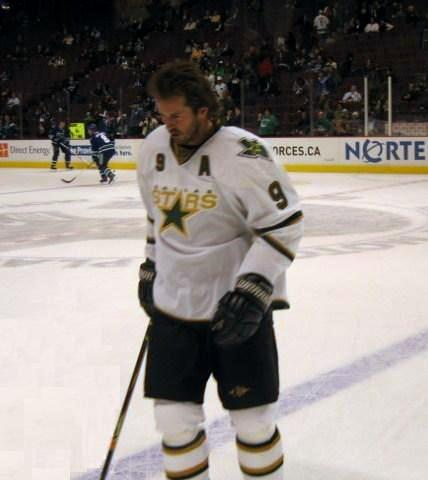
Dallas Stars center Mike Modano in 2006

Ice hockey has been a growing participatory sport in the Dallas-Fort Worth area since the Minnesota North Stars of the National Hockey League (NHL) became the Dallas Stars in 1993. The Stars made the Stanley Cup playoffs their first year in Dallas and remained competitive through the rest of decade, culminating in a Stanley Cup championship in 1999. The team returned to the Stanley Cup Final the next year, only to lose to the New Jersey Devils. In addition to the 1999 Stanley Cup and 2000 Western Conference championship, the team has also won two Presidents' Trophies as the NHL's regular-season points champion and seven division titles.

Prior to the advent of the Stars, top-tier professional ice hockey existed in Texas in the form of the Houston Aeros, who played in the World Hockey Association (WHA) from 1973 to 1978. The team was notable for featuring hockey legend Gordie Howe, who was lured out of retirement by the prospect of playing alongside his sons, Mark and Marty. Led by the Howes, the Aeros won back-to-back Avco World Trophies as the WHA champions in 1974 and 1975. The Aeros folded after they failed to gain admission into the NHL, first as part of a merger between the WHA and NHL and then as an expansion team.

Minor league professional hockey has also become popular in the last several decades. The Houston Huskies played in the old United States Hockey League (USHL) and won its championship in 1948, led by legendary NHL coach Toe Blake. In 1994, Houston received a franchise in the International Hockey League (IHL), which was named the Aeros after the city's old WHA side. The new Aeros won the IHL's Turner Cup in 1999. In 2001, the team transferred to the American Hockey League (AHL) after the IHL's demise; it won the AHL's Calder Cup in 2003 and reached the Calder Cup Finals in 2011. The AHL has established two more teams in Texas since that time – the San Antonio Rampage (owned by the NBA's San Antonio Spurs and affiliated with the NHL's Colorado Avalanche) began play in 2002, and the Texas Stars (an AHL affiliate of the Dallas Stars based in the Austin suburb of Cedar Park), began play seven years later. In 2013 the Aeros would leave Texas to become the Iowa Wild. In 2020, the Rampage would be purchased by the Vegas Golden Knights and relocated to Henderson, Nevada, becoming the Henderson Silver Knights.

Between 1992 and 2014, the Central Hockey League had fifteen different teams based in Texas and as many as nine from 2002 to 2005. However, by the CHL's final season, only the Allen Americans remained. The Americans joined the ECHL in 2014 and went on to win the championship in their first season in the league.

== Soccer ==
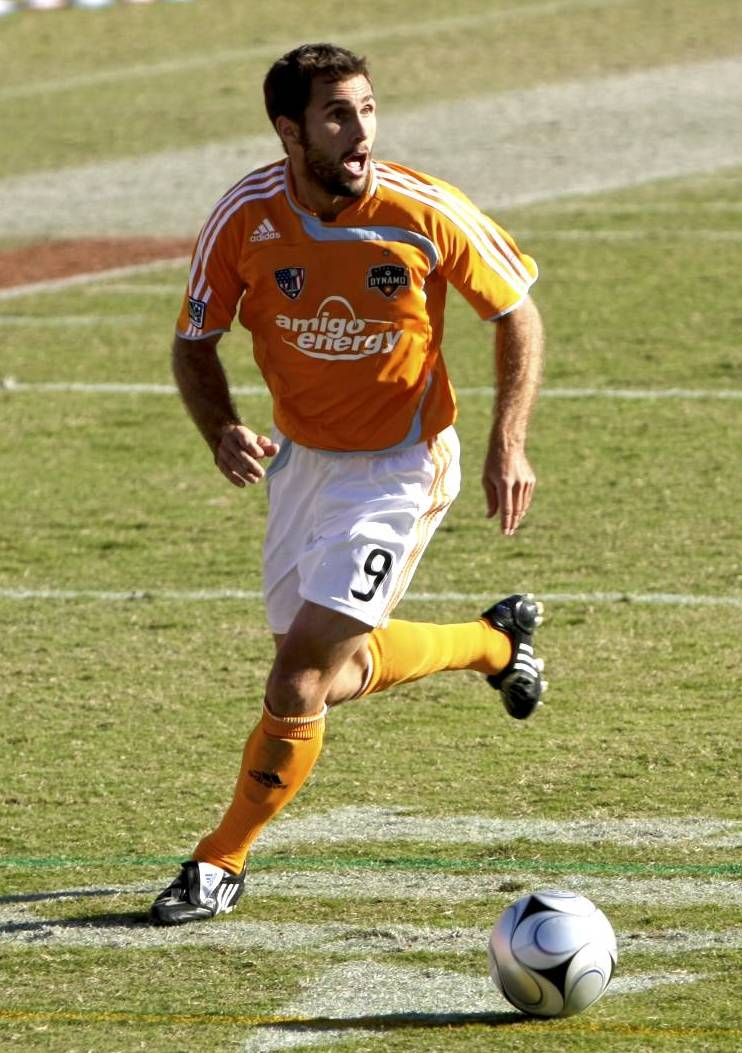
Brian Mullan of the Houston Dynamo during the 2008 Western Conference Semifinals.

The major professional North American Soccer League had teams in the Dallas/Fort Worth area, Houston, and in San Antonio. The Dallas Tornado played between 1968 and 1981 (winning the 1971 Soccer Bowl), the Houston Stars played for one season in 1968, and the San Antonio Thunder played for two seasons, 1975–1976. Houston returned to the league in 1978 as the Hurricanes and played until 1980. Soccer returned to Texas with the 1994 FIFA World Cup with the Cotton Bowl hosting matches.

In 1996, the Dallas Burn was born as one of 10 founding members of Major League Soccer, which is the current Division 1 professional soccer league overseen by the U.S. Soccer Federation. The Dallas Burn were later renamed FC Dallas with a new logo and colors, and now play in a soccer-specific stadium called Toyota Stadium in Frisco. A second Texas team, Houston Dynamo FC, joined MLS in 2006 (with "FC" added to the club branding in 2020). The Dynamo won the MLS Cup in their first year in Houston, and again in their second year in 2007. Dynamo FC now plays at Shell Energy Stadium, a soccer-specific stadium near downtown Houston. Texas received its third MLS team in 2021 with the arrival of Austin FC. The city had originally been planned as the future home of the Columbus Crew, but the move proved controversial, triggering lawsuits by the city of Columbus and state of Ohio. The dispute was settled with an investment group led by the owners of the Cleveland Browns buying the Crew, while former Crew owner Anthony Precourt received a new Austin team.

Before the Austin FC deal was finalized, MLS Commissioner Don Garber had stated publicly that a third city in Texas—either San Antonio or Austin—was under consideration for a possible MLS expansion franchise. At that time, only San Antonio had a professional minor league soccer team; San Antonio FC play in the second-tier USL Championship, but another Texas team, Austin Bold FC, joined in 2019. Bold FC effectively replaced the Austin Aztex, which joined the USL Championship in 2015, when the competition was known as the United Soccer League, but only played one season. The Aztex went on hiatus while seeking to build a new stadium, but eventually folded after being unable to secure a site. Eventually, a new deal for a stadium on the grounds of the Circuit of the Americas emerged, clearing the way for Bold FC to join the league. Bold FC isn't currently active in the league, pending a move to Fort Worth. Texas currently has three active teams in the USL Championship—Rio Grande Valley FC Toros, which began play in 2016 as the reserve side of the Dynamo, San Antonio FC which also began play in 2016, and El Paso Locomotive FC, which started play in 2019. Another professional team, North Texas SC, began play in 2019 as the reserve side of FC Dallas, playing in the newly launched third-level USL League One. It has since moved to another third-level league, MLS Next Pro, which began play in 2022 as the de facto successor to MLS' former reserve league.

In 2014, the Houston Dash, owned and operated by Dynamo FC and also playing at Shell Energy Stadium, joined the National Women's Soccer League, the longest-tenured and most prominent of the country's two current top-level women's leagues. Texas also fields 12 teams in the Women's Premier Soccer League, the second-highest league in the United States soccer pyramid. Those teams are the El Paso Surf, DKSC BADTOP, FC Dallas, SouthStar FC, AHFC Royals, Austin Rise FC, Bat Country FC, Challenge Red Devils, Corinthians FC of San Antonio, Houston Aces, Lonestar SC and San Antonio Blossoms.

The Cotton Bowl in Dallas hosted six matches during the 1994 FIFA World Cup. During the 2026 FIFA World Cup, matches were held at AT&T Stadium in the Dallas-Fort Worth Metroplex and Reliant Stadium in Houston. Along with California, Texas is one of two states which hosted 2026 FIFA World Cup matches at two stadiums in their respective state.

== Collegiate ==
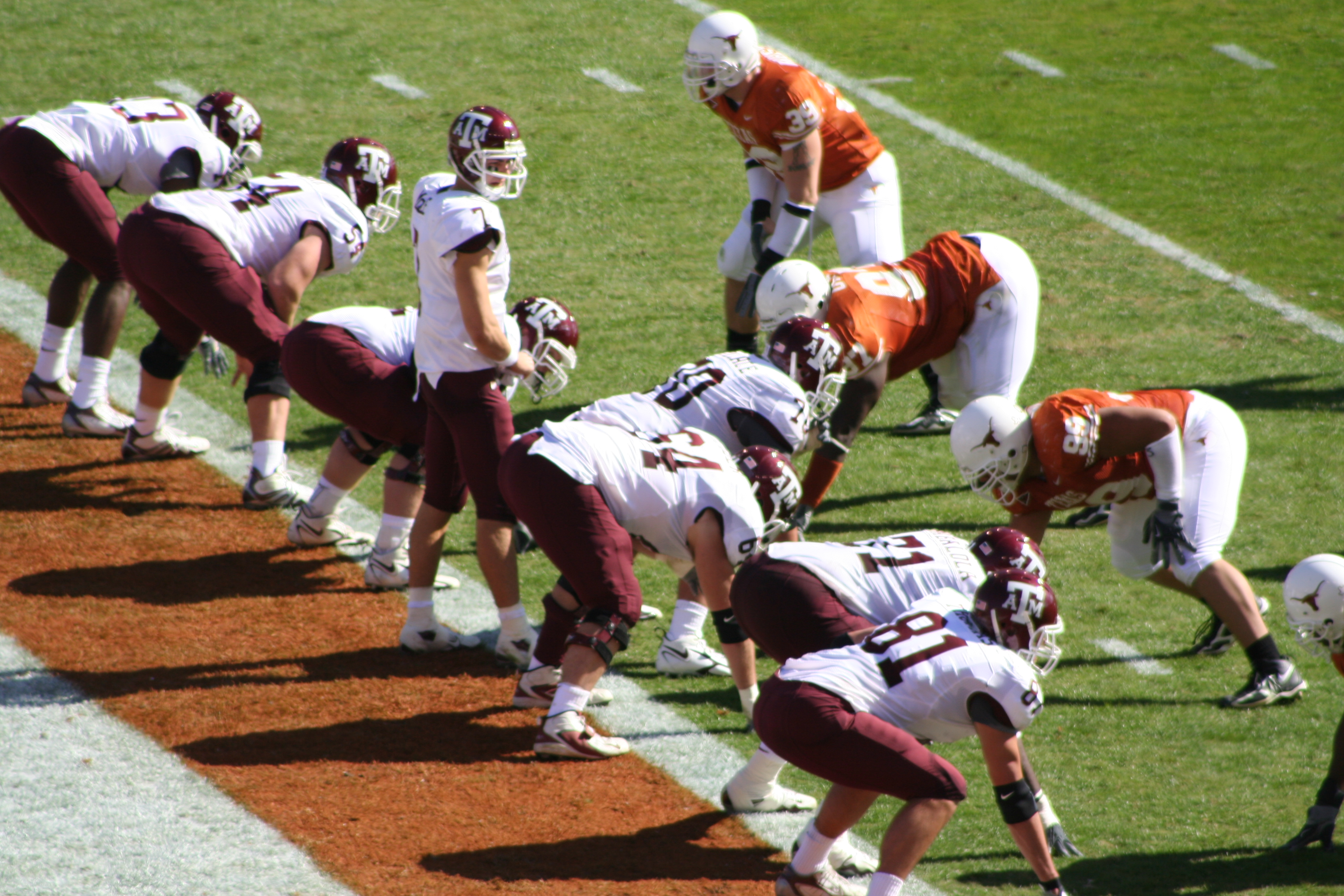
2006 Lone Star Showdown football game at Darrell K Royal–Texas Memorial Stadium in Austin

Originally, most Texas Division I universities were part of the Southwest Conference until it dissolved in 1996. As of the upcoming 2026 season, 13 Texas schools compete in the top level of college football, Division I FBS. Seven of those schools compete in a Power Four conference. The Baylor Bears, Houston Cougars, TCU Horned Frogs, and Texas Tech Red Raiders compete in the Big 12 Conference; the Texas Longhorns and Texas A&M Aggies in the Southeastern Conference; the SMU Mustangs in the Atlantic Coast Conference; the North Texas Mean Green, Rice Owls, and UTSA Roadrunners in the American Conference; the UTEP Miners in the Mountain West Conference; the Texas State Bobcats in the Pac-12 Conference; and the Sam Houston Bearkats in Conference USA. Texas has the most FBS schools in the United States.

According to a survey of FBS coaches, the rivalry between the University of Oklahoma and the University of Texas at Austin, the Red River Shootout, ranks the third-best in the nation. A fierce rivalry, the Lone Star Showdown, also exists between the two state's largest universities, Texas A&M University and the University of Texas. This athletic rivalry was put on hold after the Aggies joined the Southeastern Conference in 2012, but resumed with the Longhorns' 2024 move to the SEC. The SMU Mustangs and Texas Christian University Horned Frogs have a rivalry called the Battle for the Iron Skillet. The Houston–Texas Tech football rivalry is a Big 12 intraconference rivalry. Houston's two largest athletic programs hold the Houston–Rice rivalry with a large focus on the Bayou Bucket Classic.

Texas is home to many other Division I programs with football teams competing in Division I FCS. The Abilene Christian Wildcats and Tarleton State Texans compete in the United Athletic Conference (UAC or The United), which had operated before the 2026–27 school year as the Western Athletic Conference (WAC) with both as members. The East Texas A&M Lions, Houston Christian Huskies, Incarnate Word Cardinals, Lamar Cardinals, Stephen F. Austin Lumberjacks. and UTRGV Vaqueros play in the Southland Conference (SLC), and the Prairie View A&M Panthers and Texas Southern Tigers are in the Southwestern Athletic Conference. Rivalries include the Battle of the Piney Woods between Sam Houston and Stephen F. Austin and another between Prairie View A&M and Texas Southern.

In addition, the state has two Division I programs that do not sponsor football—the Texas A&M–Corpus Christi Islanders of the SLC, and the UT Arlington Mavericks of the United.

Collegiate teams nationwide see Texas as an American football recruiting hotbed. In 2006, 170 players in the NFL came from Texas high schools.

School	Nickname	Division	Conference(s)
Abilene Christian University	Wildcats	NCAA Division I	United Athletic Conference
Baylor University	Bears	NCAA Division I	Big 12 Conference
East Texas A&M University	Lions	NCAA Division I	Southland Conference
University of Houston	Cougars	NCAA Division I	Big 12 Conference
Houston Christian University	Huskies	NCAA Division I	Southland Conference
University of the Incarnate Word	Cardinals	NCAA Division I	Southland Conference
Lamar University	Cardinals and Lady Cardinals	NCAA Division I	Southland Conference
University of North Texas	Mean Green	NCAA Division I	American Conference
Prairie View A&M University	Panthers and Lady Panthers	NCAA Division I	Southwestern Athletic Conference
Rice University	Owls	NCAA Division I	American Conference
Sam Houston State University	Bearkats	NCAA Division I	Conference USA
Southern Methodist University	Mustangs	NCAA Division I	Atlantic Coast Conference
Stephen F. Austin State University	Lumberjacks and Ladyjacks	NCAA Division I	Southland Conference
Tarleton State University	Texans	NCAA Division I	United Athletic Conference
Texas Christian University	Horned Frogs	NCAA Division I	Big 12 Conference
University of Texas at Austin	Longhorns	NCAA Division I	Southeastern Conference
Texas A&M University	Aggies	NCAA Division I	Southeastern Conference
Texas A&M University-Corpus Christi	Islanders	NCAA Division I	Southland Conference
Texas Southern University	Tigers	NCAA Division I	Southwestern Athletic Conference
Texas State University	Bobcats	NCAA Division I	Pac-12 Conference
Texas Tech University	Red Raiders	NCAA Division I	Big 12 Conference
University of Texas at Arlington	Mavericks	NCAA Division I	United Athletic Conference
University of Texas at El Paso	Miners	NCAA Division I	Mountain West Conference
University of Texas Rio Grande Valley	Vaqueros	NCAA Division I	Southland Conference
University of Texas at San Antonio	Roadrunners	NCAA Division I	American Conference

== High school ==
Most primary and secondary school athletic, music, and academic contests in Texas involving public schools are organized and administered by the University Interscholastic League (UIL). As a general rule, the UIL only governs public schools. Private schools are governed by other bodies, the largest of which is the Texas Association of Private and Parochial Schools (TAPPS). Both bodies have similar governing scope, although some terminology differs. The TAPPS category of "fine arts" encompasses what UIL calls "academic" and "music" competitions, and also includes competitions for spirit squads (i.e., cheerleading and dance teams), which UIL does not sponsor (other bodies govern cheer/dance competitions among public schools).

== Rodeo ==
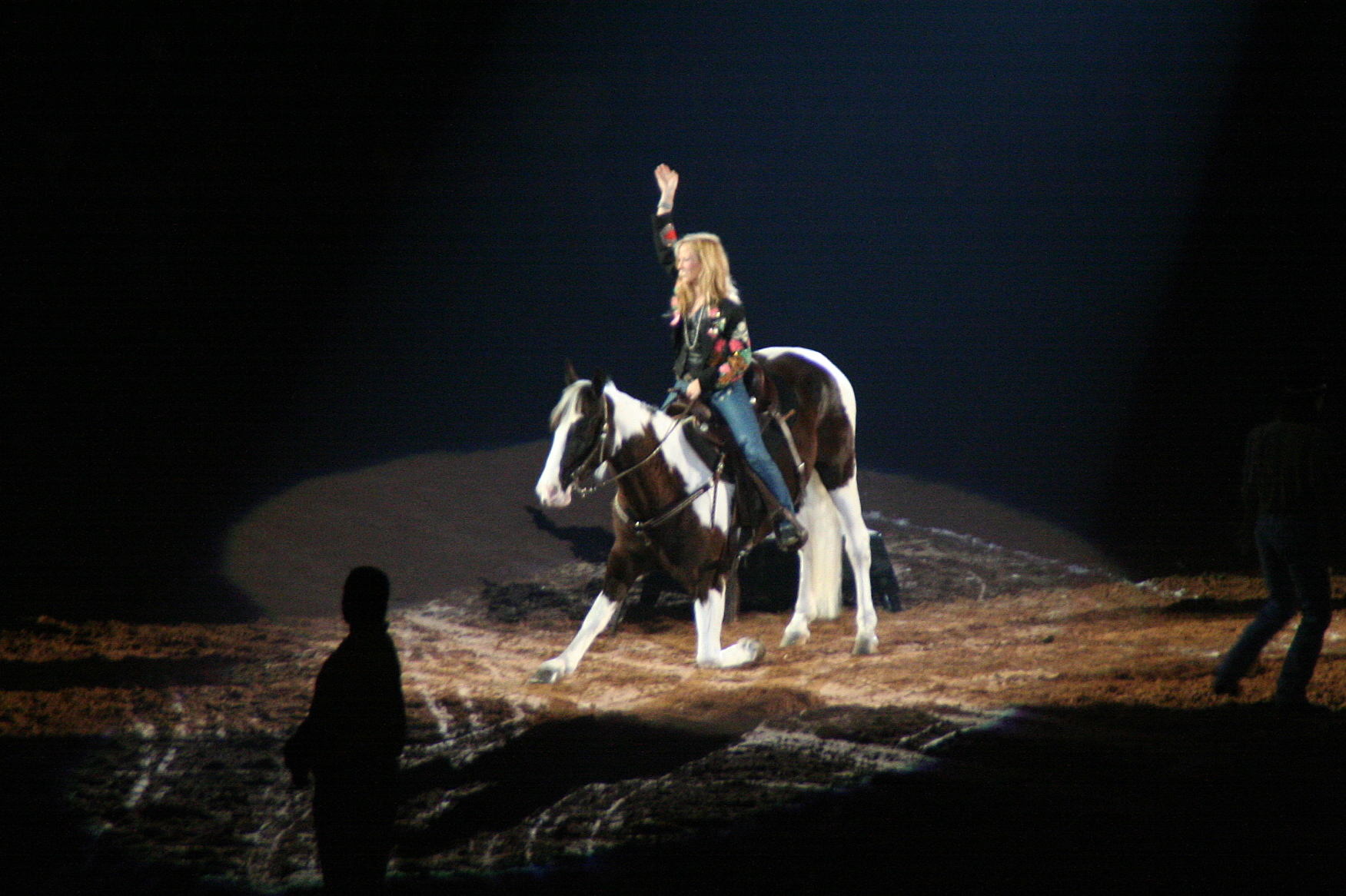
Sheryl Crow at Houston Livestock Show and Rodeo

Texans also enjoy going to the rodeo. The annual Houston Livestock Show and Rodeo is the largest rodeo in the world. The event begins with trail rides that originate from several points throughout the state, all of which convene at Reliant Park. The world's first rodeo was held in Pecos, Texas on July 4, 1883. The Southwestern Exposition and Livestock Show in Fort Worth, Texas has a cowboy, and a Mexican and many traditional rodeos. The State Fair of Texas is held each year at Fair Park in Dallas.

== Gymnastics ==
Gymnastics in Texas is very popular and is one of the largest states for the sport in the country. Multiple Olympians and World Champions have come out of the state including; Nastia Liukin (2008 Olympic AA Champion), Carly Patterson (2004 Olympic AA Champion), Simone Biles (2013, 2014, 2015, 2018, 2019, and 2023 World AA Champion and 2016 and 2024 Olympic all-around champion), and Madison Kocian (2015 world uneven bars champion).

There are many gymnastics clubs in Texas but the top facilities include World Olympic Gymnastics Academy (Plano & Frisco), Texas Dreams Gymnastics (Coppell) and Metroplex Gymnastics (Allen).

The Women's U.S. National Gymnastics Training Center had been just outside Houston, at the Karolyi Ranch in Huntsville, Texas, from 2001 to 2018, when Karolyi Ranch closed permanently in the wake of the USA Gymnastics sex abuse scandal.

Plano, Texas is considered the "gymnastics capital of the world" because of the gymnastics academy, WOGA.

== Golf ==
Texas hosts five PGA Tour golf tournaments: WGC Match Play, Houston Open, Texas Open, Byron Nelson Classic, and Colonial National Invitational. Other professional tournaments in the state are the North Texas LPGA Shootout and the Insperity Invitational. Notable Texan golfers include Ben Hogan, Byron Nelson, Jimmy Demaret, Tom Kite, Ben Crenshaw, Scottie Scheffler (born in New Jersey, but moved to Texas as a child), Jordan Spieth, Lee Trevino, and Kathy Whitworth.

== Motorsport ==
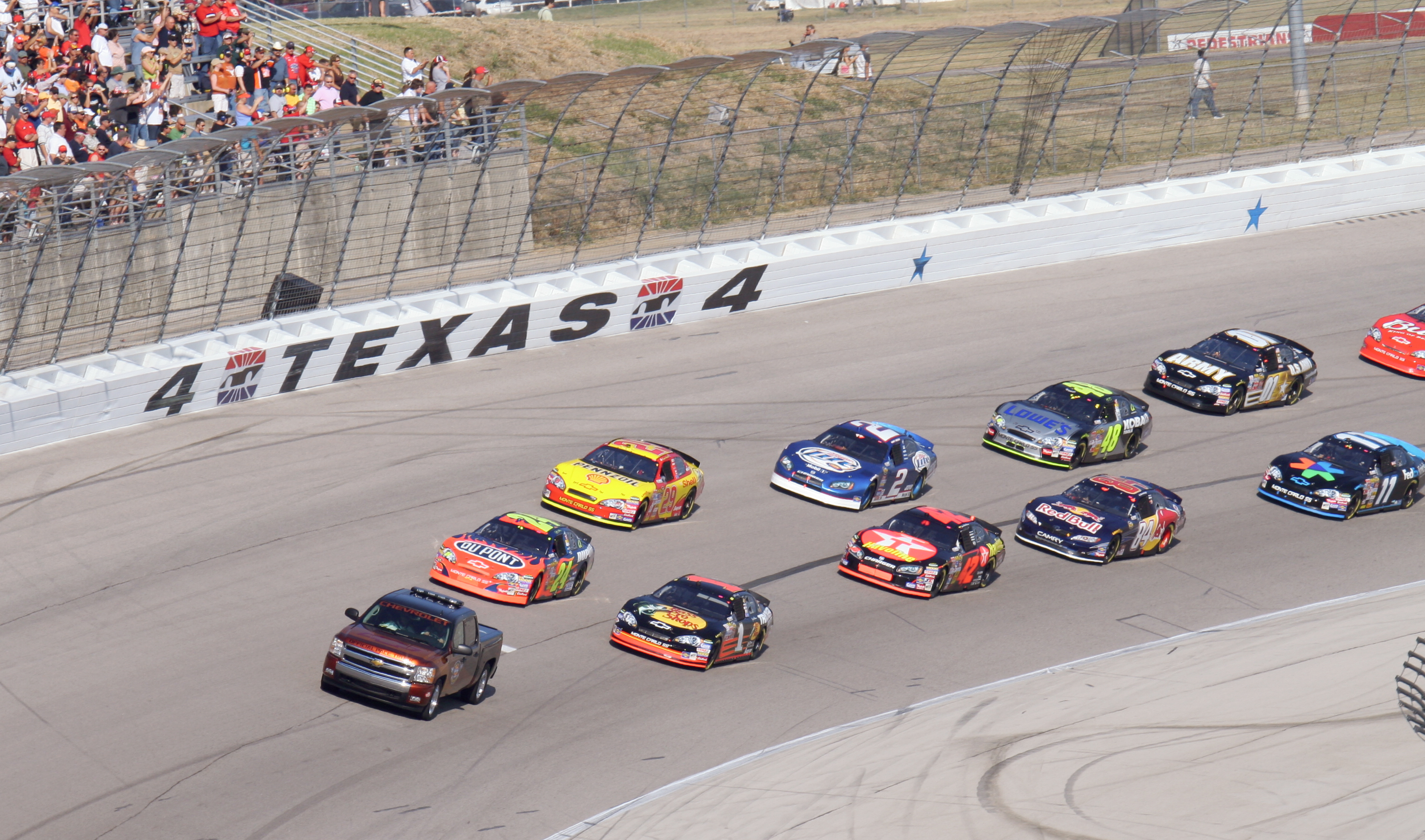
NASCAR racing at Texas Motor Speedway

The state is home to motorsport venues such as the Texas Motor Speedway in Fort Worth, which hosts NASCAR and IndyCar races, and the Texas World Speedway in College Station. The Circuit of the Americas near Austin hosts the United States Grand Prix in Formula One, NASCAR races and the Motorcycle Grand Prix of the Americas in MotoGP.

The Texas Motorplex and Houston Raceway Park dragstrips host rounds of the NHRA Mello Yello Drag Racing Series. Dallas and Houston have hosted street races, the Dallas Grand Prix and the Grand Prix of Houston, as well as AMA Supercross Championship rounds.

Auto racing is the second most watched sport on TV in the state, behind American football. NASCAR races tend to do better in Texas media markets than NBA games.

== Esports ==
Major esports organizations located in Texas:

Organization	Location
Clutch Gaming	Houston
compLexity Gaming	Frisco
Dallas Fuel	Dallas
Houston Outlaws	Houston
Mavs Gaming	Dallas
OpTic Gaming	Dallas
OpTic Texas	Dallas

== Other sports ==
Another popular sport in Texas is year-round fishing. Lacrosse, originally played by some of the indigenous tribes, is growing in popularity.

Chess is also another popular sport in Texas. Organized chess in Texas is coordinated in part through the Texas Chess Association, the designated Texas affiliate of the United States Chess Federation, which has served Texas players for more than 80 years through tournaments, publications and chess-club development. Major recurring events in the state include the Texas State and Amateur Championship and the Southwest Open; the 2026 Texas State and Amateur Championship was listed as the 81st edition, while the 2025 Southwest Open was listed as the 91st edition. Scholastic chess is also organized statewide: the 2026 Texas Scholastic “Super State” Championship was scheduled for Austin, with more than 800 players and families expected from across Texas.

Club	Sport	League
Allen Americans	Ice hockey	ECHL
Alpine Cowboys	Baseball	Pecos League
Amarillo Bulls	Junior ice hockey	North American Hockey League
Amarillo Sod Poodles	Baseball	Texas League
Amarillo Venom	Indoor football	Champions Indoor Football
Austin Gilgronis	Rugby union	Major League Rugby
Austin Spurs	Basketball	NBA G League
Cleburne Railroaders	Baseball	American Association
Corpus Christi Hooks	Baseball	Texas League
Corpus Christi IceRays	Junior ice hockey	North American Hockey League
Dallas Renegades	Football	United Football League
El Paso Chihuahuas	Baseball	Pacific Coast League
El Paso Locomotive FC	Soccer	USL Championship
Fort Worth NLL team	Box lacrosse	National Lacrosse League
Fort Worth USL team (Note: Team currently on hiatus; last played as Austin Bold FC in 2021 before relocating to Fort Worth. Planning to resume play in 2024.)	Soccer	USL Championship
Frisco RoughRiders	Baseball	Texas League
Houston Dynamo 2	Soccer	MLS Next Pro
Houston Energy	Football	Independent Women's Football League
Houston Gamblers	Football	United Football League
Houston SaberCats	Rugby union	Major League Rugby
Lone Star Brahmas	Junior ice hockey	North American Hockey League
Midland RockHounds	Baseball	Texas League
North Texas SC	Soccer	MLS Next Pro
Odessa Jackalopes	Junior ice hockey	North American Hockey League
Rio Grande Valley Vipers	Basketball	NBA G League
Round Rock Express	Baseball	Pacific Coast League
San Antonio FC	Soccer	USL Championship
San Antonio Missions (Note: Played as the Colorado Springs Sky Sox until the 2018 season.)	Baseball	Texas League
Sugar Land Space Cowboys	Baseball	Pacific Coast League
Texas Legends	Basketball	NBA G League
Texas Stars	Ice hockey	American Hockey League
Texoma FC	Soccer	USL League One

== Stadiums and arenas ==
Stadium	City	Capacity	Type	Tenant(s)	Opened
Kyle Field	College Station	102,512	Football	Texas A&M Aggies	1927
Darrell K Royal-Texas Memorial Stadium	Austin	100,119	Football	Texas Longhorns	1924
Cotton Bowl	Dallas	92,100	Football	Red River Rivalry, State Fair Classic, First Responder Bowl, Dallas Trinity FC	1930
AT&T Stadium	Arlington	80,000	Football	Dallas Cowboys, Cotton Bowl Classic	2009
Reliant Stadium	Houston	71,500	Football	Houston Texans, Texas Bowl	2002
Alamodome	San Antonio	65,000	Football	UTSA Roadrunners, Alamo Bowl, U.S. Army All-American Bowl, San Antonio Commanders	1993
Galaxy Stadium	Lubbock	61,000	Football	Texas Tech Red Raiders	1947
Sun Bowl Stadium	El Paso	51,500	Football	UTEP Miners and Sun Bowl	1963
First Community Stadium	Houston	47,000 (Note: To be downsized to ~30,000 capacity by 2028.)	Football	Rice Owls	1950
Choctaw Stadium	Arlington	46,100	Football, soccer (Note: Choctaw Stadium was originally a baseball park, hosting the Texas Rangers from 1994 through 2019. With the Rangers moving to the nearby Globe Life Field, the stadium has been reconfigured for football and soccer.)	North Texas SC	1994 (Note: Date of original opening; reopened in 2020 as a football/soccer stadium.)
McLane Stadium	Waco	45,140	Football	Baylor Bears	2014
Amon G. Carter Stadium	Fort Worth	44,008	Football	TCU Horned Frogs, Armed Forces Bowl	1930
Daikin Park	Houston	40,950	Baseball	Houston Astros	2000
Globe Life Field	Arlington	40,000	Baseball	Texas Rangers	2020
TDECU Stadium (Note: To be renamed Space City Financial Stadium in 2026.)	Houston	40,000	Football	Houston Cougars	2014
Gerald J. Ford Stadium	University Park	32,000	Football	SMU Mustangs	2000
DATCU Stadium	Denton	30,850	Football	North Texas Mean Green	2011
UFCU Stadium	San Marcos	30,000	Football	Texas State Bobcats	1981
Memorial Stadium	Stephenville	24,000	Football	Tarleton State Texans, high schools	1977
Shell Energy Stadium	Houston	22,000	Soccer, football	Houston Dynamo FC, Houston Dash, Houston Gamblers, Texas Southern Tigers	2012
Toyota Stadium	Frisco	20,500	Soccer, football	FC Dallas, Dallas Renegades, high school football (Note: Also hosted the NCAA Division I Football Championship game (FCS) from 2011–2025 (2010–2024 seasons).)	2005
Memorial Stadium	Mesquite	20,000	Football	High schools	1977
Happy State Bank Stadium	Canyon	20,000	Football	High schools	1959
American Airlines Center	Dallas	19,200	Arena	Dallas Mavericks, Dallas Stars	2001
Frost Bank Center	San Antonio	18,581	Arena	San Antonio Spurs, San Antonio Rampage	2002
Alamo Stadium	San Antonio	18,500	Football	High schools	1940
Farrington Field	Fort Worth	18,500	Football	High schools	1939
Toyota Center	Houston	18,055	Arena	Houston Rockets	2003
Eagle Stadium	Allen	18,000	Football	High schools	2012
Astound Broadband Stadium	Midland	18,000	Football, soccer	High schools, Midland-Odessa FC	2002
Ratliff Stadium	Odessa	17,500	Football	High schools, UT Permian Basin Falcons	1982
Stallworth Stadium	Baytown	16,500	Football	High schools	1969
Provost Umphrey Stadium	Beaumont	16,000	Football	Lamar Cardinals	1964
United Supermarkets Arena	Lubbock	15,098	Arena	Texas Tech Red Raiders and Lady Raiders	1999
Shotwell Stadium	Abilene	15,075	Football	High schools	1959
Dick Bivins Stadium	Amarillo	15,000	Football	High schools	1950
Javelina Stadium	Kingsville	15,000	Football	Texas A&M–Kingsville Javelinas	1950
John Kincaide Stadium	Dallas	15,000	Football	High schools	2005
Panther Stadium at Blackshear Field	Prairie View	15,000	Football	Prairie View A&M Panthers	2016
Homer Bryce Stadium	Nacogdoches	14,575	Football	Stephen F. Austin Lumberjacks	1973
Memorial Stadium	Wichita Falls	14,500	Football	Midwestern State Mustangs, high schools	1970
John Clark Stadium	Plano	14,442	Football	High schools	1977
Dickies Arena	Fort Worth	14,000	Arena	Panther City Lacrosse Club	2019
McAllen Veterans Memorial Stadium	McAllen	13,500	Football	High schools	1976
Reed Arena	College Station	12,989	Arena	Texas A&M Aggies	1998
Bowers Stadium	Huntsville	12,593	Football	Sam Houston Bearkats	1986
Irving Schools Stadium	Irving	12,500	Football	High schools	—N/a
Pennington Field	Bedford	12,500	Football	High schools	1987
Veterans Memorial Stadium	Pasadena	12,500	Football	High schools	1965
Birklebach Field	Georgetown	12,442	Football	High schools, Southwestern Pirates	2008
Don Haskins Center	El Paso	12,222	Arena	UTEP Miners	1977
Anthony Field at Wildcat Stadium	Abilene	12,000	Football	Abilene Christian Wildcats	2017
Bain–Schaeffer Buffalo Stadium	Canyon	12,000	Football	West Texas A&M Buffaloes	2019
C. H. Collins Athletic Complex	Denton	12,000	Football	High schools	2004
Canutillo Stadium	Canutillo	12,000	Football	High schools	2005
The Ford Center at The Star	Frisco	12,000	Football	Dallas Cowboys practice facility, high schools	2017
Herman Clark Stadium	Fort Worth	12,000	Football	High schools	1970
Legacy Stadium	Katy	12,000	Football	High schools	2017
Maverick Stadium	Arlington	12,000	Football	UT Arlington Mavericks track, high schools	1980
McKinney ISD Stadium	McKinney	12,000	Football	High schools	2018
Robert and Janet Vackar Stadium	Edinburg	12,000	Football	UTRGV Vaqueros	2017
Memorial Stadium	Commerce	11,582	Football	East Texas A&M Lions, high schools	1950
Heroes Stadium	San Antonio	11,122	Football	High schools	2009
Bobby Morrow Stadium	San Benito	11,000	Football	High schools	2006
Cy-Fair FCU Stadium	Cypress	11,000	Football	High schools	2006
Dragon Stadium	Southlake	11,000	Football	High schools	2001
Ken Pridgeon Stadium	Cypress	11,000	Football	High schools	1977
SISD Student Activities Complex	El Paso	11,000	Football	High schools	2000
Dr Pepper Ballpark	Frisco	10,600	Baseball	Frisco RoughRiders	2003
Dub Farris Stadium	San Antonio	10,568	Football	High schools	—N/a
Hopper Field	Freeport	10,478	Football	High schools	1949
Galena Park ISD Stadium	Houston	10,300	Football	High schools	2002
Ferrell Center	Waco	10,284	Arena	Baylor Bears	1988
Montagne Center	Beaumont	10,080	Arena	Lamar Cardinals and Lady Cardinals	1984
Tiger Stadium	Corsicana	10,001	Football	Navarro Bulldogs, High schools, Corsicana Bowl	2006
Challenger Columbia Stadium	League City	10,000	Football	High schools	2016
Coach Kenny Deel Stadium	Melissa	10,000	Football	High schools	2023
Moody Center	Austin	10,000	Arena	Texas Longhorns	2022
W.W. Thorne Stadium	Houston	10,000	Football	High schools	1979
Tom Kimbrough Stadium	Plano	9,800	Football	High schools	2003
UNT Coliseum	Denton	9,797	Arena	North Texas Mean Green	1973
Woodforest Bank Stadium	Shenandoah	9,600	Football	High schools	2008
Lumpkins Stadium	Waxahachie	9,500	Football	Nelson Lions, high schools	1972
Wolff Stadium	San Antonio	9,500	Baseball	San Antonio Missions	1994
Southwest University Park	El Paso	9,500	Baseball, soccer	El Paso Chihuahuas, El Paso Locomotive FC	2014
Pearland Stadium	Pearland	9,200	Football	High schools	2001
Ford Arena	Beaumont	9,100	Arena	Oxford City FC of Texas	2003
Dell Diamond	Round Rock	8,688	Baseball, rugby	Round Rock Express, Austin Herd	2000
Fort Bend Epicenter	Rosenberg	8,600	Arena	TBA	2023
Schollmaier Arena	Fort Worth	8,500	Arena	TCU Horned Frogs	1961
Student Activity Complex	Laredo	8,500	Football	High schools	2004
Wilkerson-Sanders Memorial Stadium	Rockwall	8,330	Football	High schools	1975
Toyota Field	San Antonio	8,296	Soccer	San Antonio FC	2013
Veterans Memorial Stadium	League City	8,200	Football	High schools	1957
Midlothian Stadium	Midlothian	8,176	Football	High schools	2006
Health and Physical Education Arena	Houston	8,100	Arena	Texas Southern Tigers	1969
EECU Center	Stephenville	8,000	Arena	Tarleton State Texans	2025
H-E-B Center at Cedar Park	Cedar Park	8,000	Arena	Austin Spurs, Texas Stars	2009
Lone Star Park	Grand Prairie	8,000	Racetrack	Horse racing	1997
Bert Ogden Arena	Edinburg	7,688	Arena	Rio Grande Valley Vipers	2018
Foster Pavilion	Waco	7,500	Arena	Baylor Bears	2024
Humble Civic Center Arena	Humble	7,500	Arena	Local sports events	—N/a
Kay Yeager Coliseum	Wichita Falls	7,380	Arena	Wichita Falls Nighthawks	2003
William R. Johnson Coliseum	Nacogdoches	7,203	Arena	Stephen F. Austin Lumberjacks and Ladyjacks	1974
Strahan Coliseum	San Marcos	7,200	Arena	Texas State Bobcats	1982
Fertitta Center	Houston	7,100	Arena	Houston Cougars	1969
Allen Event Center	Allen	7,080	Arena	Allen Americans, Dallas Sidekicks	2009
College Park Center	Arlington	7,000	Arena	UT Arlington Mavericks, Dallas Wings	2012
Moody Coliseum	University Park	7,000	Arena	SMU Mustangs	1956
SaberCats Stadium	Houston	4,000	Rugby union (Note: Built for rugby union's now-defunct Houston SaberCats, but now housing soccer and ultimate teams.)	Houston Dynamo 2, Houston Havoc	2019

== See also ==
- AT&T SportsNet Southwest
- Comcast/Charter Sports Southeast
- Fox Sports Southwest
- Houston Astros Radio Network
