= Texas Sports Hall of Fame =

US sporting award

Coordinates: 31°33′9″N 97°7′4″W

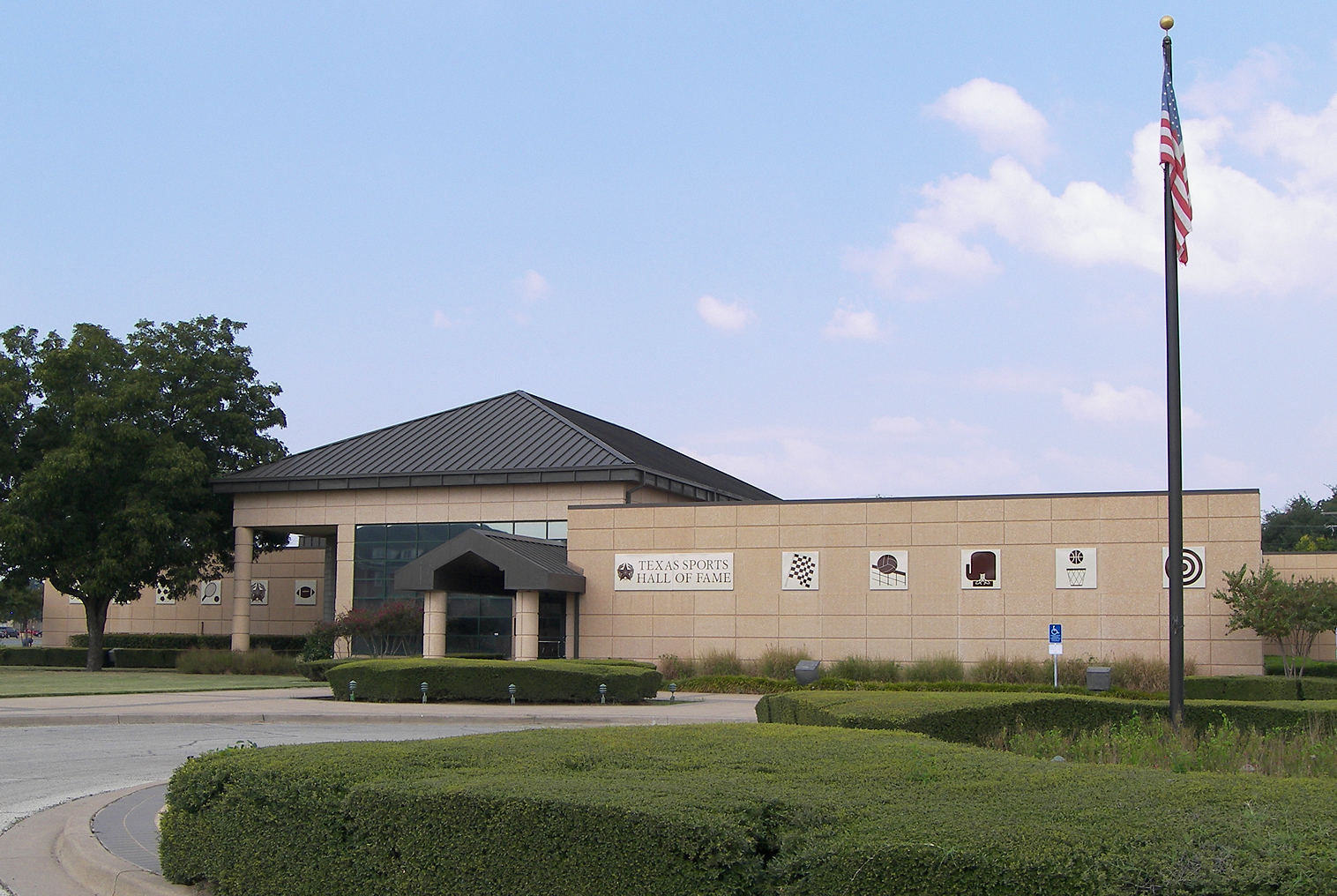
The Texas Sports Hall of Fame in Waco.

The Texas Sports Hall of Fame recognizes athletes, coaches, and administrators who have made "lasting fame and honor to Texas sports". It was established in 1951 by the Texas Sports Writers Association. Once it made its first induction (baseball star Tris Speaker) in 1951, Texas became the first U.S. state to have a sports hall of fame.

== History ==
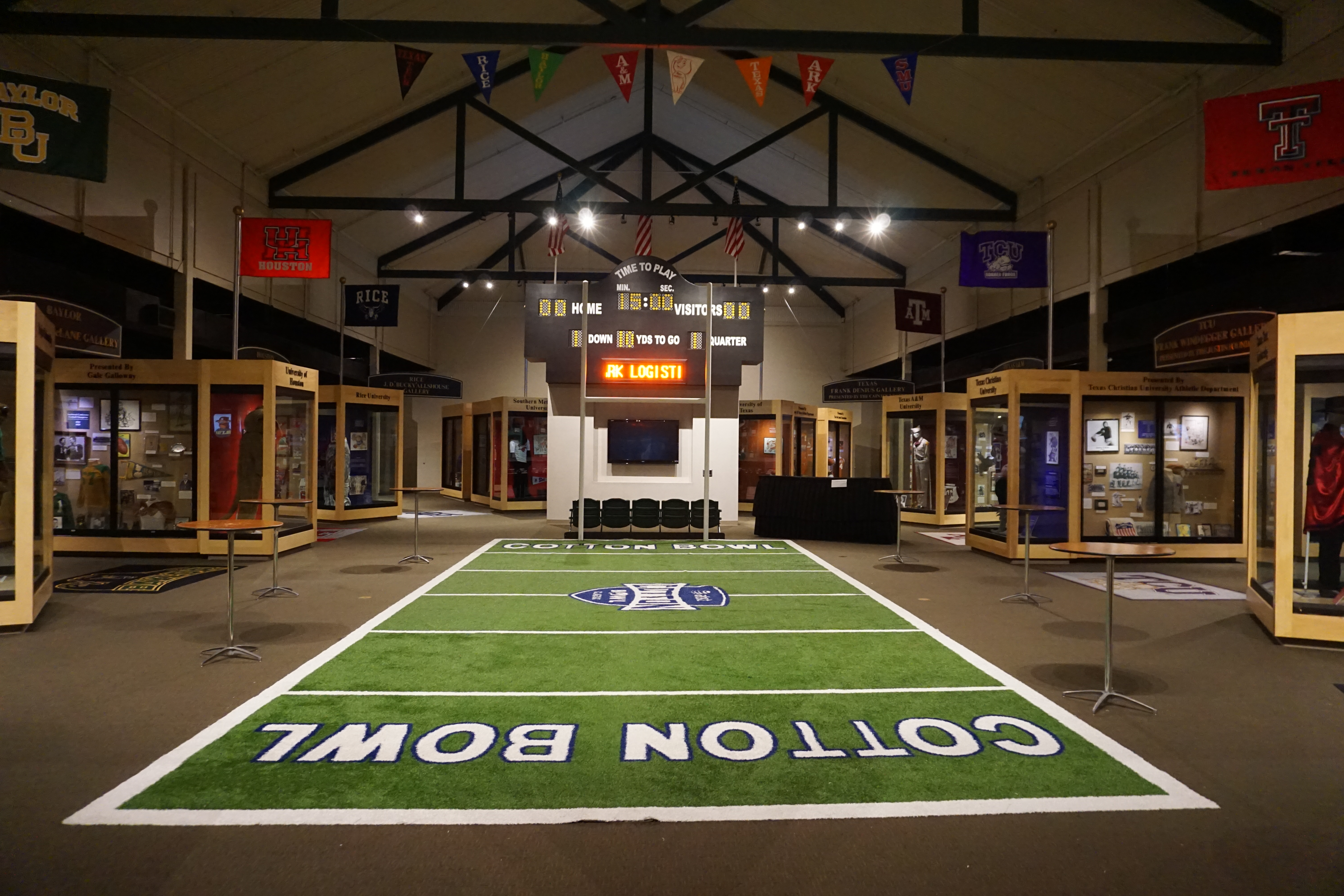
Southwest Conference Gallery and Cotton Bowl Exhibit at the Texas Sports Hall of Fame.

Home of more than 300 Texas legends, the Texas Sports Hall of Fame was the idea of the sports editor at The Beaumont Enterprise. Thad Johnson spoke to the Texas Sportswriters Association during the 1949 Texas High School Coaches Association All Star Games in Beaumont about starting the Hall of Fame. The sports writers unanimously agreed with Johnson and in 1951 baseball great Tris Speaker was the inaugural inductee and Texas became the first state to honor its athletes with a hall of fame. The Texas Sports Hall of Fame under the guidance of Texas sports entrepreneur Lamar Hunt was opened in Grand Prairie on Saturday, May 23, 1981 but was closed in 1986. The Hall of Fame remained dormant until several prominent members of the Waco community created a plan in 1990 to have the Hall of Fame moved to Waco.

Their plan was realized on April 16, 1993 when Waco had its grand opening for the Texas Sports Hall of Fame. The museum also houses the Texas Tennis Museum and Hall of Fame and Texas High School Football Hall of Fame. The Hall of Fame expanded in 2010 to include a new banquet hall, the Health, Fitness and Education Center and Texas’ preeminent college conference, the Southwest Conference (SWC). The Southwest Conference was a national power conference for most of the century until it broke up in 1996. The Southwest Conference exhibit displays the grand history of college athletics in Texas.

The Texas Sports Hall of Fame is now truly representative of the athletic history in Texas as it sits at 35,000 sq. ft., of which 2,000 sq. ft. is dedicated to the Texas Tennis Hall of Fame. History

== Selection process ==
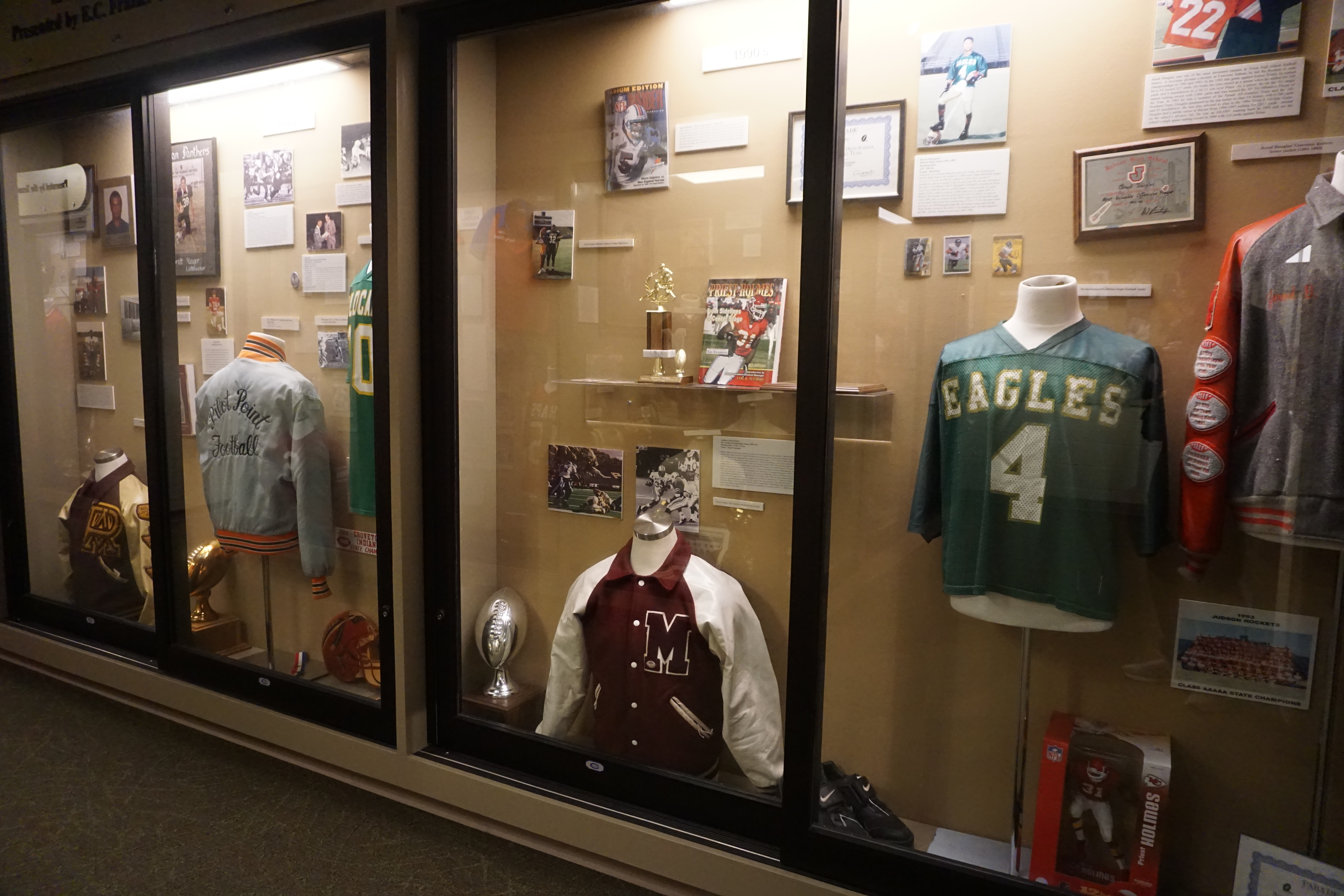
Texas High School Football Hall of Fame

Nominations for the Hall of Fame are open to the public. The selection committee, consisting of at least 21 sports journalists from various Texas newspapers, meets annually to review the nominees and make a ballot. The ballot consists of a primary and veterans section. The Primary Ballot has 20 names, while the Veterans has 12. Dues-paying members of the Hall of Fame vote each year to decide the inductees. The top 6 vote getters of the Primary Ballot and the top 2 of the Veterans are inducted into the Hall of Fame. The top 5 vote getters of each ballot who are not selected are automatically placed into the next year's ballot.

The Hall of Fame, with assistance from the selection committee, notifies the winning nominees once the voting process has completed.

The winning nominees, if they accept their induction, must then attend the banquet at Ferrell Center in Waco to be officially inducted into the Hall of Fame. If a nominee rejects their induction, the Hall of Fame inducts the next highest vote getter. If a nominee declines their induction for two consecutive years without a legitimate reason, the nominee will not be eligible for the ballot for another five years.

== Notable inductees ==
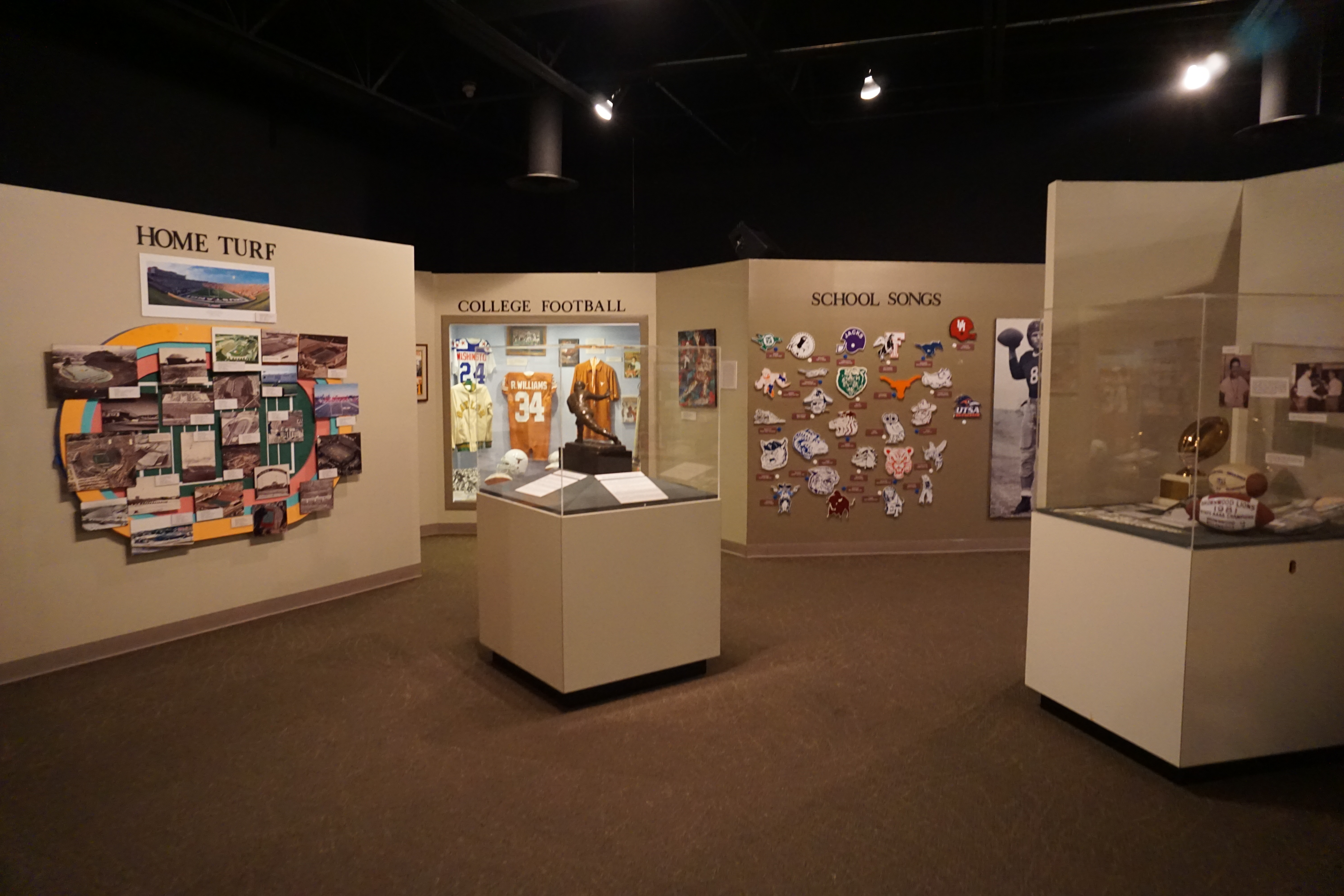
Football inductee exhibits

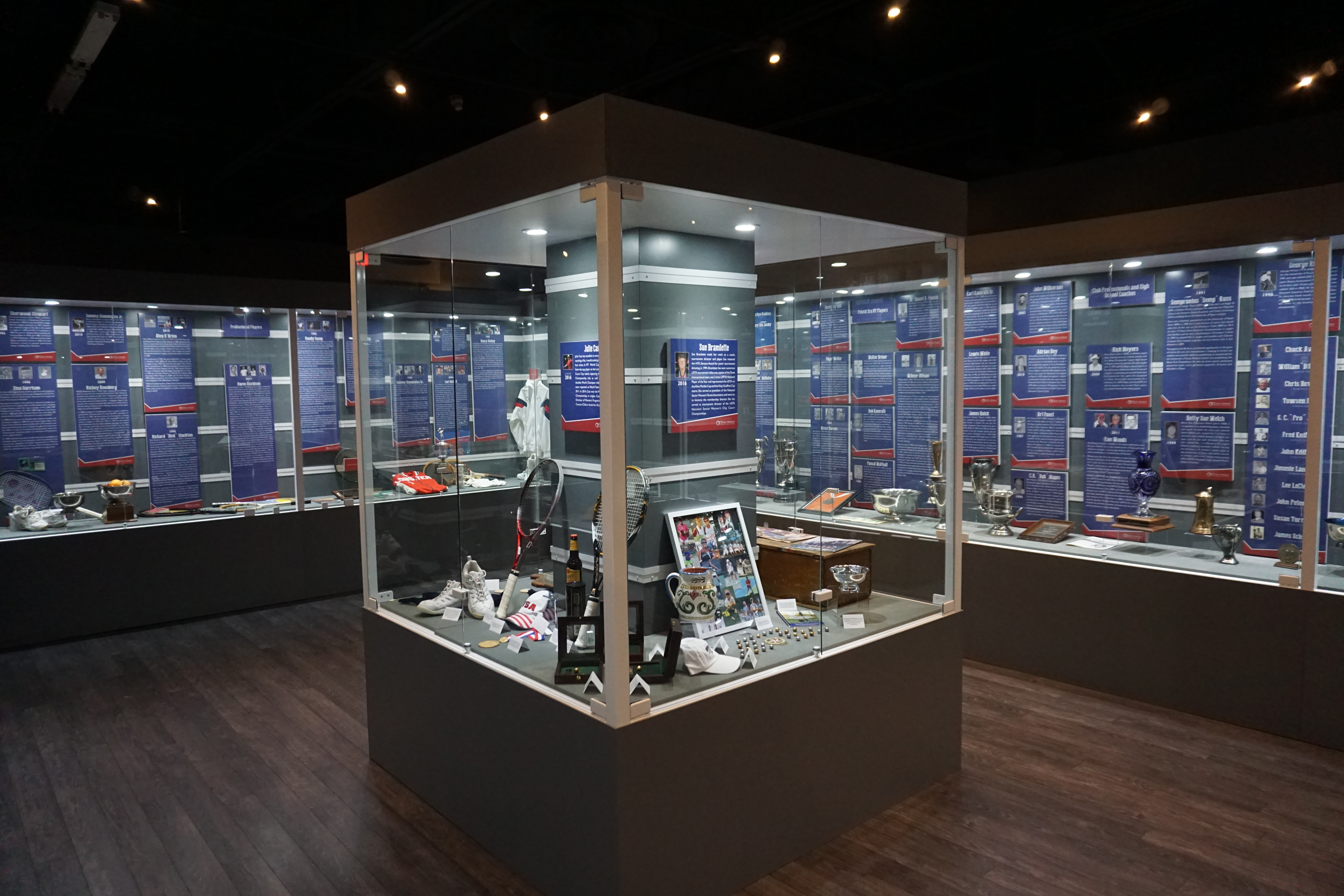
Texas Tennis Museum and Hall of Fame

- Troy Aikman (Dallas Cowboys) – retired NFL quarterback, three-time Super Bowl champion, Pro Football Hall of Fame inductee.
- Jeff Bagwell (Houston Astros, inducted 2005) − retired MLB first baseman, 1994 National League MVP, Astros' all-time leader in home runs and runs batted in, Baseball Hall of Fame inductee.
- Sammy Baugh (TCU) – College and Pro Football Hall of Fame inductee, former NFL quarterback and 5× All-Pro selection with the Washington Redskins
- Elvin Bethea (Houston Oilers) – retired NFL defensive end and Pro Football Hall of Fame inductee
- Craig Biggio (Houston Astros, inducted 2005) − retired MLB second baseman and catcher, Baseball Hall of Fame inductee, 3,000 hit club member, Astros' all-time leader in hits and doubles
- Gary Blair (Texas A&M) – briefly played college baseball at Texas Tech, current Texas A&M Aggies women's basketball team, top 35 all-time winningest active Division I women's basketball coaches.
- Drew Brees (Austin Westlake) – led the Westlake Chaparrals to the 1996 UIL 5A Championship, NFL quarterback, Super Bowl XLIV winner/MVP, and Pro Football Hall of Fame inductee.
- Norm Cash – native of Justiceburg, Texas, former MLB first baseman and 1968 World Series champion with the Detroit Tigers.
- Roger Clemens (Texas) – retired MLB starting pitcher and two-time World Series champion, who played for the Houston Astros and also played college baseball for the Texas Longhorns.
- George Foreman (Boxing)
- Hayden Fry (Baylor) – football coach at Odessa High School, Baylor and SMU and other colleges.
- Augie Garrido (Texas) – college baseball coach, five-time College World Series champion (including two with the Texas Longhorns baseball team).
- Bob Hayes (Dallas Cowboys) – retired NFL wide receiver, Super Bowl VI winner with the Cowboys, Pro Football Hall of Fame inductee.
- Roy Hofheinz (Houston Astros) - Former Mayor of Houston, founder and owner of the Houston Astros, created the Astrodome.
- Lamar Hunt (SMU) – sports promoter and administrator, former owner of the Dallas Burn/FC Dallas soccer franchise, Pro Football Hall of Fame inductee.
- Yale Lary – the first Texas A&M player inducted into the Pro Football Hall of Fame; won three NFL championships with the Detroit Lions in the 1950s.
- Mike Modano - the first hockey player in the TSHOF; played 16 seasons for the Dallas Stars; highest-scoring American-born player in NHL history; member of both the Hockey Hall of Fame and the United States Hockey Hall of Fame.
- Andre Johnson (Houston Texans) – retired NFL wide receiver, franchise leader in receptions, receiving yards and receiving touchdowns, Pro Football Hall of Fame inductee.
- Shaquille O'Neal (San Antonio Robert G. Cole) – retired NBA center, three-time NBA MVP winner, four-time NBA champion, member of the Naismith Memorial Basketball Hall of Fame
- Cat Osterman (Texas) – Texas Longhorns softball player, 2004 Summer Olympics Gold Medalist
- Drew Pearson (Dallas Cowboys) – retired NFL wide receiver Super Bowl XII champion, Pro Football Hall of Fame inductee.
- David Robinson (San Antonio Spurs) – retired NBA center, two-time NBA champion, member of the Naismith Memorial Basketball Hall of Fame.
- Darrell Royal (Texas) – long-time Texas Longhorns football coach and later Athletic Director, namesake of the Longhorns' home stadium Darrell K Royal–Texas Memorial Stadium.
- R. C. Slocum (Texas A&M) – long-time coach of the Texas A&M Aggies football team.
- LaDainian Tomlinson (TCU) – retired NFL running back, College and Pro Football Hall of Fame inductee .
- Ricky Williams (Texas) – retired NFL running back, 1998 Heisman Trophy winner and member of the Texas Longhorns football team (1995-1998),
- Mildred "Babe" Didrikson Zaharias – native of Beaumont, Texas, Olympic Gold Medalist in athletics and pioneer in women's golf.

== See also ==
- List of museums in Central Texas
