= Herman Clark (coach) =

American football player and coach and athletics administrator

Biographical details
- Born: c. 1903
- Died: June 30, 1976 (aged 76); Fort Worth, Texas, U.S.

Playing career

Football
- 1923–1926: TCU

Football
- 1924–1927: TCU
- Position: Quarterback (football)

Coaching career (HC unless noted)

Football
- 1927: Belton HS (TX)
- 1928: Daniel Baker
- 1929–1931: Centre (backfield)
- 1932–1941: North Side HS (TX)
- 1942: Georgia Pre-Flight (backfield)

Baseball
- 1929: Daniel Baker

Administrative career (AD unless noted)
- 1945–1968: Fort Worth ISD (TX)

Head coaching record
- Overall: 5–3–2 (college football)

Accomplishments and honors

Championships
- Football; 1 TIAA (1928) Baseball; TIAA (1929)

Awards
- First-team All-SWC (1925)

Herman Clark (c. 1903 – May 23, 1959) was an American football and baseball player and coach, and athletics administrator. He played college football at Texas Christian University (TCU) in Fort Worth, Texas as a quarterback from 1923 to 1926 and college baseball for TCU from 1924 to 1927. Clark served as the head football coach at Daniel Baker College in Brownwood, Texas for one season, in 1928, compiling a record of 5–3–2 and leading his team to the Texas Intercollegiate Athletic Association (TIAA) title. He was also the head baseball coach at Daniel Baker in the spring of 1929. Clark was the athletic director for the Fort Worth Independent School District for 23 years until his retirement in 1968.

A native of Fort Worth, Clark attended North Side High School. After graduating from TCU in 1927, he became a teacher and football coach at Belton High School in Belton, Texas. Following his one year at Daniel Baker, Clark moved on to Centre College in Danville, Kentucky to serve as an assistant football coach in charge of the backfield under head football coach Ed Kubale, who had been an assistant at TCU during Clark's playing days. In 1932, Clark returned to Fort Worth to become head football coach at his alma mater, North Side High School. He coached North Side for 10 seasons until he resigned in 1942 to enter the United States Navy. As a lieutenant, Clark was assigned to the Navy Pre-Flight Training School in Athens, Georgia and was the backfield coach for the 1942 Georgia Pre-Flight Skycrackers football team. He was transferred in early 1943 to the naval aviation cadet selection board in Dallas.

Herman Clark Stadium, built in 1970, in Fort Worth, is named for him. Clark died on June 30, 1979, after collapsing at his home in Fort Worth while doing yardwork.

== Head coaching record ==
=== College football ===
Year	Team	Overall	Conference	Standing	Bowl/playoffs
Daniel Baker Hill Billies (Texas Intercollegiate Athletic Association) (1928)
1928	Daniel Baker	5–3–2	4–0	1st	
Daniel Baker:		5–3–2	4–0		
Total:		5–3–2			
National championship Conference title Conference division title or championship game berth
