= 1928 Rice Owls football team =

American college football season

1928 Rice Owls football
- Conference: Southwest Conference
- Record: 2–7 (0–5 SWC)
- Head coach: Claude Rothgeb (1st season)
- Home stadium: Rice Field

1928 Southwest Conference football standings
	Conf.					Overall
Team	W		L		T	W		L		T
Texas $	5	–	1	–	0	7	–	2	–	0
Arkansas	2	–	1	–	0	7	–	2	–	0
Baylor	3	–	2	–	0	8	–	2	–	0
TCU	3	–	2	–	0	8	–	2	–	0
SMU	2	–	2	–	1	6	–	3	–	1
Texas A&M	1	–	3	–	1	5	–	4	–	1
Rice	0	–	5	–	0	2	–	7	–	0
$ – Conference champion

The 1928 Rice Owls football team was an American football team that represented Rice Institute as a member of the Southwest Conference (SWC) during the 1928 college football season. In its first and only season under head coach Claude Rothgeb, the team compiled a 2–7 record (0–5 against SWC opponents) and was outscored by a total of 174 to 83.

== Schedule ==
Date	Opponent	Site	Result	Attendance	Source
September 29	Sam Houston State*	Rice Field; Houston, TX	W 24–6		
October 6	St. Edward's*	Rice Field; Houston, TX	L 0–31		
October 13	Trinity (TX)*	Rice Field; Houston, TX	W 20–6		
October 20	at SMU	Ownby Stadium; University Park, TX	L 13–53		
October 27	Texas	Rice Field; Houston, TX	L 6–13	9,000	
November 3	Southwestern (TX)*	Rice Field; Houston, TX	L 6–14		
November 10	TCU	Rice Field; Houston, TX	L 0–7	5,000	
November 17	at Texas A&M	Kyle Field; College Station, TX	L 0–19		
November 29	Baylor	Rice Field; Houston, TX	L 14–25		
*Non-conference game
