= 1928 Arkansas Razorbacks football team =

American college football season

1928 Arkansas Razorbacks football
- Conference: Southwest Conference
- Record: 7–2 (2–1 SWC)
- Head coach: Francis Schmidt (7th season)
- Captain: Alva Winters
- Home stadium: The Hill

1928 Southwest Conference football standings
	Conf.					Overall
Team	W		L		T	W		L		T
Texas $	5	–	1	–	0	7	–	2	–	0
Arkansas	2	–	1	–	0	7	–	2	–	0
Baylor	3	–	2	–	0	8	–	2	–	0
TCU	3	–	2	–	0	8	–	2	–	0
SMU	2	–	2	–	1	6	–	3	–	1
Texas A&M	1	–	3	–	1	5	–	4	–	1
Rice	0	–	5	–	0	2	–	7	–	0
$ – Conference champion

The 1928 Arkansas Razorbacks football team represented the University of Arkansas in the Southwest Conference (SWC) during the 1928 college football season. In their seventh and final year under head coach Francis Schmidt, the Razorbacks compiled a 7–2 record (2–1 against SWC opponents), finished in second place in the SWC, shut out five of their nine opponents, and outscored all opponents by a combined total of 251 to 63.

== Schedule ==
Date	Opponent	Site	Result	Source
September 29	at Ole Miss*	Hemingway Stadium; Oxford, MS (rivalry)	L 0–25	
October 6	Ozarks*	The Hill; Fayetteville, AR	W 21–0	
October 13	vs. Baylor	Grim Stadium; Texarkana, TX	W 14–0	
October 20	at Texas	War Memorial Field; Austin, TX (rivalry)	L 7–20	
October 27	Texas A&M^{†}	The Hill; Fayetteville, AR (rivalry)	W 27–12	
November 3	vs. LSU*	State Fair Stadium; Shreveport, LA (rivalry)	W 7–0	
November 17	Missouri Mines*	The Hill; Fayetteville, AR	W 45–6	
November 24	Oklahoma Baptist*	The Hill; Fayetteville, AR	W 57–0	
November 29	at Southwestern (TN)*	Fargason Field; Memphis, TN	W 73–0	
*Non-conference game; ^{†}Homecoming
