= 1928 Daniel Baker Hill Billies football team =

American college football season

1928 Daniel Baker Hill Billies football

TIAA champion
- Conference: Texas Intercollegiate Athletic Association
- Record: 5–3–2 (4–0 TIAA)
- Head coach: Herman Clark (1st season)
- Captain: Broad

1928 Texas Intercollegiate Athletic Association football standings
	Conf.					Overall
Team	W		L		T	W		L		T
Daniel Baker $	4	–	0	–	0	5	–	3	–	2
McMurry	4	–	1	–	0	6	–	3	–	0
Abilene Christian	4	–	1	–	0	5	–	4	–	0
Sam Houston State	3	–	2	–	0	5	–	5	–	0
North Texas State Teachers	2	–	2	–	0	4	–	5	–	0
East Texas State	3	–	4	–	0	3	–	5	–	0
Southwest Texas State	2	–	3	–	0	2	–	7	–	0
West Texas State	0	–	4	–	0	2	–	7	–	0
Stephen F. Austin	0	–	5	–	0	1	–	9	–	0
$ – Conference champion

The 1928 Daniel Baker Hill Billies football team represented Daniel Baker College as a member of the Texas Intercollegiate Athletic Association (TIAA) during the 1928 college football season. Led by Herman Clark in his first and only season as head coach, the team went 5–3–2. Daniel Baker won the TIAA title with a 4–0 mark in conference play.

== Schedule ==
Date	Time	Opponent	Site	Result	Attendance	Source
September 29	3:00 p.m.	at TCU*	Clark Field; Fort Worth, TX	L 0–21	5,000	
October 6		at Centenary*	Centenary Field; Shreveport, LA	L 12–20		
October 13		McMurry	Brownwood, TX	W 13–0		
October 19		Sam Houston State	Brownwood, TX	W 17–0		
October 27	3:00 p.m.	at Simmons (TX)*	Parramore Field; Abilene, TX	T 6–6	3,000	
November 2		Texas Tech*	Brownwood, TX	T 0–0		
November 12		Austin*	Brownwood, TX	W 13–6	4,000	
November 23		Southwest Texas State	Brownwood, TX	W 20–0		
November 29		at Abilene Christian	Abilene, TX	W 14–0	2,000	
December 5		St. Edward's*	Brownwood, TX	L 0–7		
*Non-conference game; All times are in Central time
