= 1928 Sam Houston State Bearkats football team =

American college football season

1928 Sam Houston State Bearkats football
- Conference: Texas Intercollegiate Athletic Association
- Record: 5–5 (3–2 TIAA)
- Head coach: J. W. Jones (6th season)
- Home stadium: Pritchett Field

1928 Texas Intercollegiate Athletic Association football standings
	Conf.					Overall
Team	W		L		T	W		L		T
Daniel Baker $	4	–	0	–	0	5	–	3	–	2
McMurry	4	–	1	–	0	6	–	3	–	0
Abilene Christian	4	–	1	–	0	5	–	4	–	0
Sam Houston State	3	–	2	–	0	5	–	5	–	0
North Texas State Teachers	2	–	2	–	0	4	–	5	–	0
East Texas State	3	–	4	–	0	3	–	5	–	0
Southwest Texas State	2	–	3	–	0	2	–	7	–	0
West Texas State	0	–	4	–	0	2	–	7	–	0
Stephen F. Austin	0	–	5	–	0	1	–	9	–	0
$ – Conference champion

The 1928 Sam Houston State Bearkats football team represented Sam Houston State Teachers College (now known as Sam Houston State University) as a member of the Texas Intercollegiate Athletic Association (TIAA) during the 1928 college football season. Led by sixth-year head coach J. W. Jones, the Bearkats compiled an overall record of 5–5 with a mark of 3–2 in conference play, placing fourth in the TIAA.

== Schedule ==
Date	Opponent	Site	Result	Source
September 22	at Centenary*	Centenary Field; Shreveport, LA	L 0–47	
September 29	at Rice*	Rice Field; Houston, TX	L 6–24	
October 5	Abilene Christian	Pritchett Field; Huntsville, TX	L 0–6	
October 12	West Texas State	Pritchett Field; Huntsville, TX	W 6–0	
October 19	at Daniel Baker	Brownwood, TX	L 0–17	
November 3	at East Texas State	Commerce, TX	W 13–0	
November 12	St. Mary's (TX)*	Pritchett Field; Huntsville, TX	W 19–7	
November 17	vs. Howard Payne*	South Texas State Fairgrounds; Beaumont, TX	L 14–44	
November 24	at South Texas State	Kingsville, TX	W 13–0	
November 29	Stephen F. Austin	Pritchett Field; Huntsville, TX (rivalry)	W 24–19	
*Non-conference game
