= 1928 North Texas State Teachers Eagles football team =

American college football season

1928 North Texas State Teachers Eagles football
- Conference: Texas Intercollegiate Athletic Association
- Record: 4–5 (2–2 TIAA)
- Head coach: John B. Reid (4th season)
- Home stadium: Eagle Field

1928 Texas Intercollegiate Athletic Association football standings
	Conf.					Overall
Team	W		L		T	W		L		T
Daniel Baker $	4	–	0	–	0	5	–	3	–	2
McMurry	4	–	1	–	0	6	–	3	–	0
Abilene Christian	4	–	1	–	0	5	–	4	–	0
Sam Houston State	3	–	2	–	0	5	–	5	–	0
North Texas State Teachers	2	–	2	–	0	4	–	5	–	0
East Texas State	3	–	4	–	0	3	–	5	–	0
Southwest Texas State	2	–	3	–	0	2	–	7	–	0
West Texas State	0	–	4	–	0	2	–	7	–	0
Stephen F. Austin	0	–	5	–	0	1	–	9	–	0
$ – Conference champion

The 1928 North Texas State Teachers Eagles football team was an American football team that represented the North Texas State Teachers College (now known as the University of North Texas) as a member of the Texas Intercollegiate Athletic Association during the 1928 college football season. In their fourth year under head coach John B. Reid, the Eagles compiled an overall record of 4–5 with a mark of 2–2 in conference play, placing fifth in the TIAA.

== Schedule ==
Date	Opponent	Site	Result	Source
September 22	at SMU*	Ownby Stadium; University Park, TX (rivalry)	L 6–33	
September 29	at Baylor*	Carroll Field; Waco, TX	L 0–45	
October 12	Decatur Baptist*	Eagle Field; Denton, TX	W 33–0	
October 19	at Stephen F. Austin	Birdwell Field; Nacogdoches, TX	W 14–7	
October 26	Southwest Texas State	Eagle Field; Denton, TX	W 17–0	
November 3	at Texas A&M*	Kyle Field; College Station, TX	L 0–44	
November 9	at East Texas State	Lion Stadium; Commerce, TX	L 12–13	
November 16	McMurry	Eagle Field; Denton, TX	L 0–2	
November 23	at Austin*	Sherman, TX	W 6–0	
*Non-conference game
