= 1928 Simmons Cowboys football team =

American college football season

1928 Simmons Cowboys football
- Conference: Texas Conference
- Record: 6–6–1 (2–3 Texas)
- Head coach: Frank Bridges (2nd season)
- Home stadium: Parramore Field

1928 Texas Conference football standings
	Conf.					Overall
Team	W		L		T	W		L		T
Howard Payne $	5	–	0	–	0	10	–	1	–	0
St. Edward's	3	–	1	–	0	6	–	5	–	0
Austin	2	–	2	–	0	4	–	6	–	0
Simmons (TX)	2	–	3	–	0	6	–	6	–	1
Southwestern (TX)	2	–	3	–	0	5	–	4	–	0
Trinity (TX)	0	–	5	–	0	2	–	8	–	0
$ – Conference champion

The 1928 Simmons Cowboys football team represented Simmons University—now known as Hardin–Simmons University—as a member of the Texas Conference during 1928 college football season. Led by Frank Bridges in his second season as head coach, the team went 6–6–1 overall, tying for fourth place in the Texas Conference with a mark of 2–3.

== Schedule ==
Date	Time	Opponent	Site	Result	Attendance	Source
September 22		Decatur Baptist*	Parramore Field; Abilene, TX	W 6–0		
September 28		vs. Sul Ross*	Big Spring, TX	W 27–7		
October 6		vs. TCU*	Buckaroo Stadium; Breckenridge, TX	L 3–19		
October 13		vs. SMU*	Spudder Park; Wichita Falls, TX	L 0–6		
October 20		at West Texas State*	Buffalo Stadium; Canyon, TX	W 25–6		
October 27	3:00 p.m.	Daniel Baker*	Parramore Field; Abilene, TX	T 6–6	3,000	
November 2		Austin	Parramore Field; Abilene, TX	L 0–6		
November 7		at Southwestern (TX)	Georgetown, TX	W 14–7		
November 12		Trinity (TX)	Parramore Field; Abilene, TX	W 32–6		
November 17		at Texas Tech*	Tech Field; Lubbock, TX	W 19–0		
November 23		St. Edward's	Parramore Field; Abilene, TX	L 0–26		
November 29		at Texas Mines*	El Paso High School Stadium; El Paso, TX	L 0–13		
December 7		at Howard Payne	Brownwood, TX	L 7–16		
*Non-conference game; All times are in Central time
