= 1928 Baylor Bears football team =

American college football season

1928 Baylor Bears football
- Conference: Southwest Conference
- Record: 8–2 (3–2 SWC)
- Head coach: Morley Jennings (3rd season)
- Captain: A. E. "Pete" Jones
- Home stadium: Carroll Field; Cotton Palace

1928 Southwest Conference football standings
	Conf.					Overall
Team	W		L		T	W		L		T
Texas $	5	–	1	–	0	7	–	2	–	0
Arkansas	2	–	1	–	0	7	–	2	–	0
Baylor	3	–	2	–	0	8	–	2	–	0
TCU	3	–	2	–	0	8	–	2	–	0
SMU	2	–	2	–	1	6	–	3	–	1
Texas A&M	1	–	3	–	1	5	–	4	–	1
Rice	0	–	5	–	0	2	–	7	–	0
$ – Conference champion

The 1928 Baylor Bears football team represented Baylor University in the Southwest Conference (SWC) during the 1928 college football season. In their third season under head coach Morley Jennings, the Bears compiled an 8–2 record (3–2 against conference opponents), tied for third place in the conference, and outscored opponents by a combined total of 219 to 54. They played their home games at Carroll Field and the Cotton Palace in Waco, Texas. A. E. "Pete" Jones was the team captain.

== Schedule ==
Date	Opponent	Site	Result	Source
September 22	Stephen F. Austin*	Carroll Field; Waco, TX	W 31–0	
September 29	North Texas State Teachers*	Carroll Field; Waco, TX	W 45–0	
October 6	Trinity (TX)*	Carroll Field; Waco, TX	W 33–0	
October 13	vs. Arkansas	Grim Stadium; Texarkana, TX	L 0–14	
October 20	at Centenary*	Centenary Field; Shreveport, LA	W 28–7	
October 27	St. Edward's*	Carroll Field; Waco, TX	W 48–7	
November 3	at TCU	Clark Field; Fort Worth, TX (rivalry)	W 7–6	
November 10	Texas^{†}	Cotton Palace; Waco, TX (rivalry)	L 0–6	
November 17	SMU	Cotton Palace; Waco, TX	W 2–0	
November 29	at Rice	Rice Field; Houston, TX	W 25–14	
*Non-conference game; ^{†}Homecoming
