= 1928 McMurry Indians football team =

American college football season

1928 McMurry Indians football
- Conference: Texas Intercollegiate Athletic Association
- Record: 6–3 (4–1 TIAA)
- Head coach: Randolph M. Medley (6th season)
- Home stadium: Donaldson Field

1928 Texas Intercollegiate Athletic Association football standings
	Conf.					Overall
Team	W		L		T	W		L		T
Daniel Baker $	4	–	0	–	0	5	–	3	–	2
McMurry	4	–	1	–	0	6	–	3	–	0
Abilene Christian	4	–	1	–	0	5	–	4	–	0
Sam Houston State	3	–	2	–	0	5	–	5	–	0
North Texas State Teachers	2	–	2	–	0	4	–	5	–	0
East Texas State	3	–	4	–	0	3	–	5	–	0
Southwest Texas State	2	–	3	–	0	2	–	7	–	0
West Texas State	0	–	4	–	0	2	–	7	–	0
Stephen F. Austin	0	–	5	–	0	1	–	9	–	0
$ – Conference champion

The 1928 McMurry Indians football team represented McMurry College—now known as McMurry University—as a member of the Texas Intercollegiate Athletic Association (TIAA) during the 1928 college football season. Led by sixth-year head coach Randolph M. Medley, the Indians compiled an overall record of 6–3 with a mark of 4–1 in conference play, tying for second place in the TIAA.

== Schedule ==
Date	Time	Opponent	Site	Result	Source
September 21		at Howard Payne*	Brownwood, TX	L 0–9	
September 29		at Randolph Junior College*	Cisco, TX	L 2–6	
October 6	3:30 p.m.	West Texas State	Donaldson Field; Abilene, TX	W 16–0	
October 13		at Daniel Baker	Brownwood, TX	L 0–13	
October 20	3:00 p.m.	at Texas Tech*	Tech Field; Lubbock, TX	L 0–3	
October 26	3:30 p.m.	Stephen F. Austin	Donaldson Field; Abilene, TX	W 49–0	
November 10	3:30 p.m.	John Tarleton*	Donaldson Field; Abilene, TX	W 32–0	
November 16		at North Texas State Teachers	Eagle Field; Denton, TX	W 2–0	
November 24	3:00 p.m.	East Texas State	Donaldson Field; Abilene, TX	W 41–13	
November 29	2:30 p.m.	at Sul Ross*	Jackson Field; Alpine, TX (rivalry)	W 7–6	
*Non-conference game; All times are in Central time
