= 1928 Texas Longhorns football team =

American college football season

1928 Texas Longhorns football
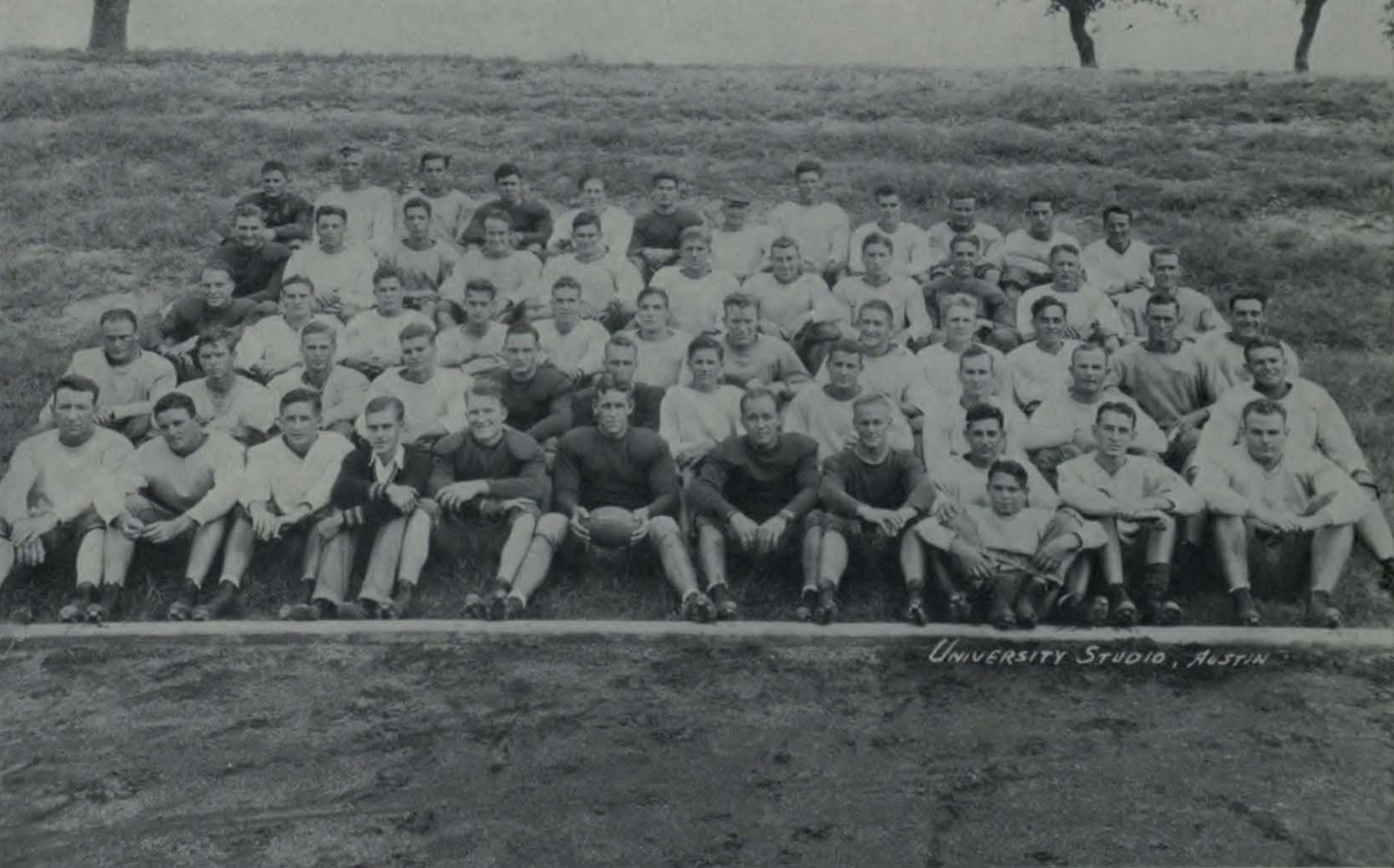

SWC champion
- Conference: Southwest Conference
- Record: 7–2 (5–1 SWC)
- Head coach: Clyde Littlefield (2nd season)
- Captain: Rufus King
- Home stadium: War Memorial Stadium

1928 Southwest Conference football standings
	Conf.					Overall
Team	W		L		T	W		L		T
Texas $	5	–	1	–	0	7	–	2	–	0
Arkansas	2	–	1	–	0	7	–	2	–	0
Baylor	3	–	2	–	0	8	–	2	–	0
TCU	3	–	2	–	0	8	–	2	–	0
SMU	2	–	2	–	1	6	–	3	–	1
Texas A&M	1	–	3	–	1	5	–	4	–	1
Rice	0	–	5	–	0	2	–	7	–	0
$ – Conference champion

The 1928 Texas Longhorns football team was an American football team that represented the University of Texas (now known as the University of Texas at Austin) as a member of the Southwest Conference (SWC) during the 1928 college football season. In their second year under head coach Clyde Littlefield, the Longhorns compiled an overall record of 7–2, with a mark of 5–1 in conference play, and finished as SWC champion.

1928 was also the first year in which Texas wore their now distinctive "burnt orange" jerseys.

== Schedule ==
Date	Opponent	Site	Result	Attendance	Source
September 29	St. Edwards*	War Memorial Stadium; Austin, TX	W 32–0		
October 6	Texas Tech*	War Memorial Stadium; Austin, TX (rivalry)	W 12–0		
October 13	vs. Vanderbilt*	Fair Park Stadium; Dallas, TX	L 12–13		
October 20	Arkansas	War Memorial Stadium; Austin, TX (rivalry)	W 20–7		
October 27	at Rice	Rice Field; Houston, TX (rivalry)	W 13–6	9,000	
November 3	SMU	War Memorial Stadium; Austin, TX	L 2–6	16,000	
November 10	at Baylor	Cotton Palace; Waco, TX	W 6–0		
November 17	at TCU	Clark Field; Fort Worth, TX (rivalry)	W 6–0		
November 29	Texas A&M	War Memorial Stadium; Austin, TX (rivalry)	W 19–0	45,000	
*Non-conference game
