= 1928 SMU Mustangs football team =

American college football season

1928 SMU Mustangs football
- Conference: Southwest Conference
- Record: 6–3–1 (2–2–1 SWC)
- Head coach: Ray Morrison (9th season)
- Captain: Earl Baccus
- Home stadium: Ownby Stadium

1928 Southwest Conference football standings
	Conf.					Overall
Team	W		L		T	W		L		T
Texas $	5	–	1	–	0	7	–	2	–	0
Arkansas	2	–	1	–	0	7	–	2	–	0
Baylor	3	–	2	–	0	8	–	2	–	0
TCU	3	–	2	–	0	8	–	2	–	0
SMU	2	–	2	–	1	6	–	3	–	1
Texas A&M	1	–	3	–	1	5	–	4	–	1
Rice	0	–	5	–	0	2	–	7	–	0
$ – Conference champion

The 1928 SMU Mustangs football team represented Southern Methodist University during the 1928 college football season, their 13th season in existence.

Their year began with two easy victories against the outmatched Denton(Texas) Normal Teachers' College (known in later years as the University of North Texas) and Howard Payne.

These games led into what could be seen as the highlight of the year, a contest against Army, already a national college football juggernaut. Although they could not win, they came within a point of victory against the powerhouse.

SMU survived a scare returning to Texas, defeating Simmons College (now Hardin-Simmons) by only 6-0 in Wichita Falls, although SMU did not play its regular players, who were still feeling fatigue returning from the Army game at West Point.

The Mustangs began their conference schedule against Rice with another convincing victory, and then added another victory against non-conference foe Trinity. However, their momentum was shattered with a difficult loss to the University of Texas, the eventual conference champions.

That Texas game would prove to be pivotal for the Mustangs in the race for the conference crown, as SMU ended the season with a tie against A&M and then two consecutive conference losses, finishing with a homecoming game loss against TCU where the entire coaching staff was out with the flu.

The campaign marked SMU's first with an All-American, with left guard and team co-captain Henry Jack "Choc" Sanders earning the honors from the New York Sun.

== Schedule ==
Date	Opponent	Site	Result	Source
September 22	North Texas State Teachers*	Ownby Stadium; University Park, TX (rivalry)	W 33–6	
September 29	Howard Payne*	Ownby Stadium; University Park, TX	W 31–0	
October 6	at Army*	Michie Stadium; West Point, NY	L 13–14	
October 13	vs. Simmons (TX)*	Spudder Park; Wichita Falls, TX	W 6–0	
October 20	Rice	Fair Park Stadium; Dallas, TX (rivalry)	W 53–13	
October 27	Trinity (TX)*	Ownby Stadium; University Park, TX	W 60–7	
November 3	at Texas	War Memorial Stadium; Austin, TX	W 6–2	
November 10	Texas A&M	Ownby Stadium; University Park, TX	T 19–19	
November 17	at Baylor	Cotton Palace; Waco, TX	L 0–2	
November 29	TCU	Ownby Stadium; University Park, TX (rivalry)	L 6–15	
*Non-conference game
