= 1928 Texas A&M Aggies football team =

American college football season

1928 Texas A&M Aggies football
- Conference: Southwest Conference
- Record: 5–4–1 (1–3–1 SWC)
- Head coach: Dana X. Bible (11th season)
- Home stadium: Kyle Field

1928 Southwest Conference football standings
	Conf.					Overall
Team	W		L		T	W		L		T
Texas $	5	–	1	–	0	7	–	2	–	0
Arkansas	2	–	1	–	0	7	–	2	–	0
Baylor	3	–	2	–	0	8	–	2	–	0
TCU	3	–	2	–	0	8	–	2	–	0
SMU	2	–	2	–	1	6	–	3	–	1
Texas A&M	1	–	3	–	1	5	–	4	–	1
Rice	0	–	5	–	0	2	–	7	–	0
$ – Conference champion

The 1928 Texas A&M Aggies football team represented the Agricultural and Mechanical College of Texas—now known as Texas A&M University—in the Southwest Conference (SWC) during the 1928 college football season. In its 11th season under head coach Dana X. Bible, the team compiled an overall record of 5–4–1, with a mark of 1–3–1 in conference play, and finished sixth in the SWC.

== Schedule ==
Date	Opponent	Site	Result	Source
September 22	Trinity (TX)*	Kyle Field; College Station, TX	W 21–0	
September 29	Southwestern (TX)*	Kyle Field; College Station, TX	W 21–0	
October 6	vs. Sewanee*	Fair Park Stadium; Dallas, TX	W 69–0	
October 13	Centenary*	Kyle Field; College Station, TX	L 0–6	
October 20	TCU	Kyle Field; College Station, TX (rivalry)	L 0–6	
October 27	at Arkansas	The Hill; Fayetteville, AR (rivalry)	L 12–27	
November 3	North Texas State Teachers*	Kyle Field; College Station, TX	W 44–0	
November 10	at SMU	Ownby Stadium; University Park, TX	T 19–19	
November 17	Rice	Kyle Field; College Station, TX	W 19–0	
November 29	at Texas	War Memorial Stadium; Austin, TX (rivalry)	L 0–19	
*Non-conference game
