= 1928 TCU Horned Frogs football team =

American college football season

1928 TCU Horned Frogs football
- Conference: Southwest Conference
- Record: 8–2 (3–2 SWC)
- Head coach: Matty Bell (6th season)
- Home stadium: Clark Field

1928 Southwest Conference football standings
	Conf.					Overall
Team	W		L		T	W		L		T
Texas $	5	–	1	–	0	7	–	2	–	0
Arkansas	2	–	1	–	0	7	–	2	–	0
Baylor	3	–	2	–	0	8	–	2	–	0
TCU	3	–	2	–	0	8	–	2	–	0
SMU	2	–	2	–	1	6	–	3	–	1
Texas A&M	1	–	3	–	1	5	–	4	–	1
Rice	0	–	5	–	0	2	–	7	–	0
$ – Conference champion

The 1928 TCU Horned Frogs football team represented Texas Christian University (TCU) as a member the Southwest Conference (SWC) during the 1928 college football season. Led by Matty Bell in his sixth and final year as head coach, the Horned Frogs compiled and overall record of 8–2 overall with a mark of 3–2 in conference play, tying for third place. TCU played their home games at Clark Field, located on campus in Fort Worth, Texas.

== Schedule ==
Date	Time	Opponent	Site	Result	Attendance	Source
September 22		East Texas State*	Clark Field; Fort Worth, TX	W 21–0		
September 29	3:00 p.m.	Daniel Baker*	Clark Field; Fort Worth, TX	W 21–0	5,000	
October 6		vs. Simmons (TX)*	Buckaroo Stadium; Breckenridge, TX	W 19–3		
October 13		Austin*	Clark Field; Fort Worth, TX	W 21–0		
October 20		at Texas A&M	Kyle Field; College Station, TX (rivalry)	W 6–0		
October 27		Texas Tech*	Clark Field; Fort Worth, TX (rivalry)	W 28–6	6,000	
November 3		Baylor	Clark Field; Fort Worth, TX (rivalry)	L 6–7		
November 10		at Rice	Rice Field; Houston, TX	W 7–0	5,000	
November 17		Texas	Clark Field; Fort Worth, TX (rivalry)	L 0–6		
November 29		SMU	Ownby Stadium; University Park, TX (rivalry)	W 15–6		
*Non-conference game; All times are in Central time
