= 1928 Southwest Texas State Bobcats football team =

American college football season

1928 Southwest Texas State Bobcats football
- Conference: Texas Intercollegiate Athletic Association
- Record: 2–7 (2–3 TIAA)
- Head coach: Oscar W. Strahan (10th season)
- Home stadium: Evans Field

1928 Texas Intercollegiate Athletic Association football standings
	Conf.					Overall
Team	W		L		T	W		L		T
Daniel Baker $	4	–	0	–	0	5	–	3	–	2
McMurry	4	–	1	–	0	6	–	3	–	0
Abilene Christian	4	–	1	–	0	5	–	4	–	0
Sam Houston State	3	–	2	–	0	5	–	5	–	0
North Texas State Teachers	2	–	2	–	0	4	–	5	–	0
East Texas State	3	–	4	–	0	3	–	5	–	0
Southwest Texas State	2	–	3	–	0	2	–	7	–	0
West Texas State	0	–	4	–	0	2	–	7	–	0
Stephen F. Austin	0	–	5	–	0	1	–	9	–	0
$ – Conference champion

The 1928 Southwest Texas State Bobcats football team was an American football team that represented Southwest Texas State Teachers College (now known as Texas State University) during the 1928 college football season as a member of the Texas Intercollegiate Athletic Association (TIAA). In their tenth year under head coach Oscar W. Strahan, the team compiled an overall record of 2–7 with a mark of 2–3 in conference play, placing seventh in the TIAA.

== Schedule ==
Date	Opponent	Site	Result	Source
September 22	at South Texas State*	Kingsville, TX	L 0–4	
September 29	Stephen F. Austin	Evans Field; San Marcos, TX	W 20–0	
October 6	Howard Payne*	Evans Field; San Marcos, TX	L 0–21	
October 13	at Abilene Christian	Fair Park; Abilene, TX	L 0–20	
October 20	Trinity (TX)*	Evans Field; San Marcos, TX	L 14–19	
October 26	at North Texas State Teachers	Eagle Field; Denton, TX	L 0–17	
November 12	Southwestern (TX)*	Evans Field; San Marcos, TX	L 7–12	
November 17	at East Texas State	Commerce, TX	W 7–0	
November 23	at Daniel Baker	Brownwood, TX	L 0–20	
*Non-conference game
