= 1928 Howard Payne Yellow Jackets football team =

American college football season

1928 Howard Payne Yellow Jackets football

Texas Conference champion
- Conference: Texas Conference
- Record: 10–1 (5–0 Texas)
- Head coach: Joe Bailey Cheaney (1st season)

1928 Texas Conference football standings
	Conf.					Overall
Team	W		L		T	W		L		T
Howard Payne $	5	–	0	–	0	10	–	1	–	0
St. Edward's	3	–	1	–	0	6	–	5	–	0
Austin	2	–	2	–	0	4	–	6	–	0
Simmons (TX)	2	–	3	–	0	6	–	6	–	1
Southwestern (TX)	2	–	3	–	0	5	–	4	–	0
Trinity (TX)	0	–	5	–	0	2	–	8	–	0
$ – Conference champion

The 1928 Howard Payne Yellow Jackets represented Howard Payne College—now known as Howard Payne University—as a member of the Texas Conference during the 1928 college football season. Led by first-year head coach Joe Bailey Cheaney, the Yellow Jackets compiled an overall record of 10–1 with a mark of 5–0 in conference play, winning the Texas Conference title.

== Schedule ==
Date	Opponent	Site	Result	Source
September 21	McMurry*	Brownwood, TX	W 9–0	
September 29	at SMU*	Ownby Stadium; University Park, TX	L 0–31	
October 6	at Southwest Texas State*	Evans Field; San Marcos, TX	W 21–0	
October 19	at Austin	Sherman, TX	W 21–0	
October 26	St. Mary's (TX)*	Brownwood, TX	W 21–7	
November 2	at Trinity (TX)	Yoakum Field; Waxahachie, TX	W 25–2	
November 10	at St. Edward's	Memorial Stadium; Austin, TX	W 16–0	
November 17	Sam Houston State*	South Texas State Fairgrounds; Beaumont, TX	W 44–14	
November 21	at Burleson College*	Brownwood, TX	W 96–0	
November 29	Southwestern (TX)	Brownwood, TX	W 27–14	
December 7	Simmons (TX)	Brownwood, TX	W 16–7	
*Non-conference game
