= Texas Chess Association =

State affiliate of the United States Chess Federation

- Abbreviation: TCA
- Formation: 1935
- Founder: John C. Thompson
- Type: Nonprofit organization
- Headquarters: Texas, United States
- Region served: Texas
- President: David Ortiz
- Parent organization: US Chess
- Website: texaschess.org

The Texas Chess Association (TCA) is the official state affiliate of the United States Chess Federation (US Chess) and serves as the governing body for chess activity in Texas. Founded in 1935, it organizes major statewide tournaments, supports scholastic and adult chess programming, and coordinates Texas representation at national events. TCA also publishes a quarterly magazine, Texas Knights, and maintains an elected board and appointed regional directors to oversee operations across the state.

== Mission ==
The mission of the Texas Chess Association is to foster the educational and social benefits of chess, support players of all ages and skill levels, and organize events that develop and recognize chess excellence throughout Texas.

== History ==
The Texas Chess Association has been instrumental in promoting chess for nearly a century. From hosting annual state championships to organizing statewide scholastic tournaments, TCA has played a central role in the growth of chess in Texas.

The organization was founded in 1935 by John Charles "J.C." Thompson, a legendary Texas chess player and organizer. Thompson was a key figure in the development of modern tournament chess in the United States. Alongside George Koltanowski, he introduced the Swiss pairing system to America at the 1942 Southwest Open in Corpus Christi, Texas. This innovation changed the way tournaments were run across the country, making large events more efficient and fair.

Thompson also won the Southwest Open seven times and was Texas State Champion in each of the first four years after World War II. His vision and leadership helped shape the Texas Chess Association into a lasting institution that continues to support players and organizers statewide. Reflecting on his legacy, Thompson once wrote, “I consider adoption of the Swiss and the Elo rating system to be the most important developments for the good of chess in the twentieth century.”

Thompson's contributions extended beyond organizing tournaments. In 1939, he began a chess column in *The Dallas Times-Herald*, combining local and international chess news with a problem-solving ladder for readers. That same year, he reportedly conducted a blindfold simultaneous exhibition against fourteen opponents, scoring ten wins, one loss, and three draws — a feat he later expanded to twenty-three boards. His most notable tournament victory came at the 1949 Southwest Open in Tulsa, where he defeated pre-tournament favorite Robert Steinmeyer and held off a challenge from his protégé, Ken Smith.

Thompson’s legacy extended to his mentorship of future chess leaders, including Ken Smith, founder of Chess Digest, and Joe Bradford, one of the state's top players. Both would go on to represent Texas at national and international events, contributing to chess development through publishing, coaching, and tournament play.

In the early 1950s, Clarence A. Cleere of Fort Worth was elected president of the Texas Chess Association, with Frank R. Graves as secretary. Their leadership helped formalize the association’s mission to promote chess throughout Texas, with an emphasis on youth programs and expanding activities into recreational centers. At the 1953 TCA meeting in Houston, held during the Southwestern Open, additional officers were elected and Fort Worth was selected to host the 1954 edition of the event.

== Activities and Events ==
The Texas Chess Association organizes and sanctions a wide variety of official tournaments across the state, serving scholastic, adult, military, and senior players. These recurring events help foster statewide participation and competitive excellence in chess.

Official Tournaments Sanctioned by the Texas Chess Association
Category	Tournament Name
General	Southwest Open
General	Texas Open
General	Texas Amateur Championship
General	Texas Postal Championship
General	Texas Quick Championship
General	Texas Action Championship
Military & Seniors	Texas Armed Forces Championship
Military & Seniors	Texas Senior Championship
Scholastic	Texas State Chess Championship
Scholastic	Texas Scholastic Championship
Scholastic	Regional Scholastic Championships (Regions I–X)
Scholastic	Texas Grade Championships
Scholastic	Texas Junior Open
Scholastic	Texas Junior Team Championship
Scholastic	Texas Junior Invitational
Scholastic	Texas Scholastic Online Open Quick Chess Championships
Girls & Women	Texas Girls' Championship
Girls & Women	Texas Girls Regional Scholastic Championships (Regions I–X)
Girls & Women	Texas Women’s Championship

In addition to organizing statewide events, the association also sanctions regional qualifiers and works closely with local clubs, schools, and affiliates to promote grassroots chess development. For example, school districts such as Eagle Mountain-Saginaw ISD have highlighted student participation in state-level tournaments, reflecting the growing popularity and educational value of scholastic chess in Texas.

== Online Tournament Innovation ==
In addition to traditional over-the-board play, the Texas Chess Association has supported and experimented with online tournament formats, particularly during and after the COVID-19 pandemic. One notable example was a manually paired, online quick chess championship hosted by TCA in 2021. The event, directed by FIDE International Arbiter Judit Sztaray, required advanced planning and real-time coordination, and was highlighted in an article detailing the challenges and lessons learned from organizing a manually paired online event.

In March 2021, Texas Chess Association partnered with ChessKid.com to run the Texas State ChessKid Online Scholastic Championships, a statewide digital event that brought together hundreds of K-12 players in a fully virtual format. The event featured multiple grade-level sections and included participation incentives, trophies, and digital fair play monitoring.

== Texas Junior Invitational ==
In 2025, the Texas Chess Association revived the Texas Junior Invitational as a premier online event featuring the top scholastic players from across the state. Each of Texas’s ten scholastic regions selected representatives to compete, along with the top finishers from the North and South State Scholastic Championships.

The event serves as a pathway to US Chess’s national invitationals, including the Denker, Barber, Rockefeller, and Haring tournaments. By restructuring the qualification process, TCA ensured that every region had representation and that the highest-performing players statewide had a fair and accessible opportunity to advance.

== Lone Star Cup ==
The Lone Star Cup is an online team championship that features the top-performing scholastic teams from the Texas Scholastic State Championships. The competition is divided into four sections, Primary, Elementary, Middle School, and High School, with each section awarding its own Lone Star Cup to determine the top team in that division statewide. On March 21st, 2026, the Primary division competed crowning the first champion with BASIS Plano winning the inaugural event.

== Scholastic Achievements and Participation ==
The Texas Chess Association provides the tournament infrastructure for scholastic play in Texas, including annual state scholastic championships and ten regional scholastic events. These tournaments attract thousands of K–12 students each year. Texas maintains one of the largest scholastic chess populations in the country, with especially high participation in the Rio Grande Valley.

In 2023, the Texas House of Representatives passed House Resolution 1836, recognizing the accomplishments of the Berta Cabaza Middle School chess team from San Benito CISD. The team placed third at the Region VIII Championships and later finished 10th nationally in the K-8 Under 1100 category at the US Chess Federation’s National Middle School Championship. Student Christian Gomez also earned sixth place nationally in the K-8 Under 1700 section. The resolution acknowledged the efforts of coach Erick Guevara and sponsor Albert Sanchez for their leadership and support.

Region VIII Scholastic Championships have consistently seen large participation numbers, with events in the Rio Grande Valley drawing over 1,200 students. In 2016, Rancho Verde Elementary and Los Fresnos High School each won their divisions at the Region VIII Championship.

In 2017, Michael Casas, a fifth-grade student from Sam Houston Elementary, was named co-champion at the State Scholastic Championship after finishing the tournament undefeated. His team also won the Elementary division.

The 2024 South Texas State Scholastic Championships, hosted by the University of Texas Rio Grande Valley, attracted more than 1,000 students from 117 school districts. The event served as a national qualifier and highlighted the growing scale of scholastic chess participation in the state.

== Governance ==
The Texas Chess Association is governed by a board of directors consisting of a President, Vice-President, Secretary, and Treasurer. As of 2025, the board members are:

- President: David Ortiz
- Vice-President: Caleb Brown
- Secretary: Dora Jara
- Treasurer: Amy Jones

To support statewide operations, TCA is divided into ten regions, each with an appointed regional director who serves as a liaison for chess activities within their area.

In 2024, the organization created a series of standing committees to broaden member engagement and improve operational focus. These committees address areas such as accessibility, bylaws, clubs, college chess, development, ethics, finance, membership, military chess, outreach, publications, public relations, recognitions, research and scholarship, rural chess, senior chess, underprivileged communities, and women and girls in chess.

TCA also appoints delegates to represent Texas at the annual Delegates Meeting of the United States Chess Federation, held during the U.S. Open. These delegates participate in national policy discussions and advocate for Texas chess interests at the federation level.

== Legacy Organizers ==
The Texas Chess Association has benefited from the long-term efforts of dedicated individuals whose leadership and service helped shape the chess landscape in Texas. Two such figures are remembered for their contributions to organizing events, building community, and promoting the game across generations.

Luis Salinas was a central figure in Texas chess for several decades, particularly in the Dallas area. He organized and directed numerous state and scholastic tournaments and was known for his calm leadership and consistency. Salinas was respected statewide for his commitment to the integrity and accessibility of tournament play.

Jim Hollingsworth was a US Chess National Tournament Director who contributed to the development of regional chess events and was a champion of engaging military veterans in chess. Known for his precision, communication, and mentorship, he played an active role in club leadership and tournament support across North Texas.

Their legacies continue to influence Texas chess through the players, organizers, and communities they inspired.

== Other Contributors ==
Over the years, various individuals have contributed to the Texas Chess Association in different capacities. One such contributor is Peter Kappler, who served as the association’s webmaster and assisted with digital infrastructure during his time with TCA.

Kappler is also known in the chess programming community for developing a private chess engine called "Grok." Outside of TCA, he was involved as a consultant on the 2013 indie film Computer Chess, which explored the early history of chess-playing software.

== Publication ==
The Texas Chess Association publishes Texas Knights, a quarterly digital magazine that serves as the official publication of the organization. Each issue features tournament reports, annotated games, player profiles, upcoming events, and chess-related articles. The magazine also includes contributions such as book reviews and puzzles. Archived issues, some dating back to the 1970s, are available on the TCA website.

== Membership ==
Membership is open to all Texas residents. Members receive access to the association's events, Texas Knights, and the right to vote in annual elections.
