= Herman Clark Stadium =

Multi-use stadium in Fort Worth, Texas

Coordinates: 32.66754°N 97.283099°W

- Interactive map of Herman Clark Stadium
- Full name: Herman E. Clark Stadium Paul Galvan Field
- Location: Fort Worth, TX
- Owner: Fort Worth ISD
- Capacity: 12,000

Construction
- Built: 1970
- Opened: 1970

Tenant
- Fort Worth ISD Schools

Herman Clark Stadium Paul Galvan Field is a 12,000-capacity multi-use stadium in Fort Worth, Texas. The stadium is mostly used for High school football where it hosts teams from the Fort Worth Independent School District but is also used for track & field contests and soccer matches. The playing surface is artificial turf and there is no video scoreboard. Built in 1970 adjacent to Tarrant County College-South Campus, the stadium is named for Herman Clark, a longtime Fort Worth ISD athletic director. The field is named for Paul Galvan.

In February 2021, the parking lots of the stadium were used to stage a drive-through COVID-19 vaccination site.
