= Shamrock Basketball Association =

The Shamrock Basketball Association is a statewide championship recreational basketball league in the state of Texas. It consists of 200 teams, 2,000 players, which all vie for a state championship. The league is open to all players, ages high school and up. All players compete within one division, regardless of age. The league operates divisions remotely in 15 cities throughout the state in 20 locations. The league has been the recipient of news coverage in its various markets for its unique history and volunteer opportunities offered to players to reduce signup fees.

== Background ==
The SBA was founded by current league CEO and President, Ryan Girardot, in his driveway in Forney, Texas, a suburb of Dallas, at the age of 13. The league continued play on his driveway until 2010, when it became a statewide organization.

== Locations ==
The league is currently located in 15 cities, with 20 locations across the state. Included in these locations are the following Texas cities: Dallas, Fort Worth, Forney, Richardson, Irving, Tyler, Longview, Conroe, College Station, Waco, Houston, San Antonio, Austin, Lubbock, Abilene, and Midland.

== Structure ==
Teams compete over an eight-week regular season, running from the first week of June through the last week of July. The local playoffs are then held during the first week of August. The winner of each local division advances to the state tournament, to compete against the 19 other division champions. The state tournament and finals are held during the second weekend of August, at a different site each year. The 2011 SBA State Tournament and Finals will be held in San Antonio, Texas. The State Finals normally consists of the conference champions competing against each other, with a musical concert following the game.
