= Providence Friars football, 1921–1929 =

American college football season

1921–1929 Providence Friars football
- Conference: Independent
- Head coach: Fred Huggins (1921–1924); Archie Golembeski (1925–1933)

The Providence Friars football program, 1921–1929 represented Providence College of Providence, Rhode Island, in college football as an independent. This article covers the time period from the program's establishment in 1921 through the 1929 season. The program was led during this time period by two head coaches: Fred Huggins (1921–1924) and Archie Golembeski (1925–1933).

== 1921 ==
1921 Providence College football
- Conference: Independent
- Record: 2–4
- Head coach: Fred Huggins (1st season)

1921 Eastern college football independents records
	Conf.			Overall
Team	W	L	T	W		L		T
Washington & Jefferson		–		10	–	0	–	1
Lafayette		–		9	–	0	–	0
Cornell		–		8	–	0	–	0
Penn State		–		8	–	0	–	2
Yale		–		8	–	1	–	0
New Hampshire		–		8	–	1	–	1
Franklin & Marshall		–		6	–	1	–	2
Villanova		–		6	–	1	–	2
Carnegie Tech		–		7	–	2	–	0
Syracuse		–		7	–	2	–	0
Harvard		–		7	–	2	–	1
Boston University		–		6	–	2	–	0
Dartmouth		–		6	–	2	–	1
Brown		–		5	–	3	–	1
Bucknell		–		5	–	3	–	1
Geneva		–		5	–	3	–	1
Pittsburgh		–		5	–	3	–	1
Holy Cross		–		5	–	3	–	0
Army		–		6	–	4	–	0
Princeton		–		4	–	3	–	0
Boston College		–		4	–	3	–	1
Fordham		–		4	–	3	–	2
Penn		–		4	–	3	–	2
Colgate		–		4	–	4	–	2
Lehigh		–		4	–	4	–	0
Springfield		–		4	–	5	–	2
Vermont		–		3	–	4	–	0
NYU		–		2	–	3	–	3
Buffalo		–		2	–	3	–	2
Drexel		–		2	–	3	–	1
Rutgers		–		4	–	6	–	0
Rhode Island State		–		3	–	5	–	0
Columbia		–		2	–	6	–	0
Tufts		–		1	–	5	–	2
Duquesne		–		0	–	4	–	1

The 1921 Providence College football team represented Providence College during the 1921 college football season. In their first year under head coach Fred Huggins, the team compiled a 2–4 record and outscored opponents by a total of 134 to 67.

=== Schedule ===
Date	Opponent	Site	Result	Source
October 1	at East Greenwich Academy	East Greenwich, RI	W 20–0	
October 8	at Boston College	Chestnut Hill, MA (rivalry)	L 0–25	
October 15	at MIT	Cambridge, MA	L 0–6	
October 19	La Salle Academy	Hope High School; Providence, RI	L 12–17	
October 22	RISD	Hope High School; Providence, RI	W 87–0	
October 29	Holy Cross B team	Hope High School; Providence, RI	L 7–19	

== 1922 ==
1922 Providence College football
- Conference: Independent
- Record: 5–4
- Head coach: Fred Huggins (2nd season)

1922 Eastern college football independents records
	Conf.			Overall
Team	W	L	T	W		L		T
Cornell		–		8	–	0	–	0
Princeton		–		8	–	0	–	0
Army		–		8	–	0	–	2
Syracuse		–		6	–	1	–	2
Franklin & Marshall		–		8	–	2	–	0
Pittsburgh		–		8	–	2	–	0
Holy Cross		–		7	–	2	–	1
Harvard		–		7	–	2	–	0
Lafayette		–		7	–	2	–	0
Springfield		–		6	–	2	–	0
Boston College		–		6	–	2	–	1
Brown		–		6	–	2	–	1
Colgate		–		6	–	3	–	0
Dartmouth		–		6	–	3	–	0
Penn		–		6	–	3	–	0
Vermont		–		6	–	3	–	0
Washington & Jefferson		–		6	–	3	–	1
Yale		–		6	–	3	–	1
Bucknell		–		7	–	4	–	0
Penn State		–		6	–	4	–	1
Carnegie Tech		–		5	–	3	–	1
Villanova		–		5	–	3	–	1
Columbia		–		5	–	4	–	0
Rutgers		–		5	–	4	–	0
Tufts		–		5	–	4	–	0
Rhode Island State		–		4	–	4	–	0
NYU		–		4	–	5	–	0
Fordham		–		3	–	5	–	2
Geneva		–		4	–	6	–	0
Boston University		–		2	–	4	–	3
Lehigh		–		3	–	5	–	1
New Hampshire		–		3	–	5	–	1
Drexel		–		2	–	4	–	0
Temple		–		1	–	4	–	1
Buffalo		–		1	–	5	–	0
CCNY		–		1	–	6	–	0
Duquesne		–		0	–	8	–	0

The 1922 Providence College football team represented Providence College during the 1922 college football season. In their second year under head coach Fred Huggins, the team compiled a 5–4 record and was outscored by a total of 130 to 110.

=== Schedule ===
Date	Opponent	Site	Result	Source
September 30	at Holy Cross	Fitton Field; Worcester, MA	L 3–33	
October 7	at Massachusetts-Lowell	Lowell, MA	W 14–0	
October 14	at CCNY	Lewisohn Stadium; New York, NY	W 16–7	
October 21	New London Submarine Base	Hendricken Field; Providence, RI	L 13–42	
October 28	Coast Guard	Henricken Field; Providence, RI	W 26–13	
November 4	at Connecticut	Gardner Dow Athletic Fields; Storrs, CT	W 10–0	
November 11	Boston University	Hendricken Field; Providence, RI	L 0–7	
November 25	at Canisius	Buffalo, NY	L 6–15	
November 30	Saint Stephen's College (NY)	Providence, RI	W 22–13	

== 1923 ==
1923 Providence College football
- Conference: Independent
- Record: 4–2–1
- Head coach: Fred Huggins (3rd season)

1923 Eastern college football independents records
	Conf.			Overall
Team	W	L	T	W		L		T
Cornell		–		8	–	0	–	0
Yale		–		8	–	0	–	0
St. John's		–		5	–	0	–	1
Dartmouth		–		8	–	1	–	0
Syracuse		–		8	–	1	–	0
Boston College		–		7	–	1	–	1
Rutgers		–		7	–	1	–	1
Washington & Jefferson		–		6	–	1	–	1
Holy Cross		–		8	–	2	–	0
Lafayette		–		6	–	1	–	2
Tufts		–		6	–	2	–	0
Army		–		6	–	2	–	1
Colgate		–		6	–	2	–	1
Geneva		–		6	–	2	–	1
Lehigh		–		6	–	2	–	1
NYU		–		6	–	2	–	1
Penn State		–		6	–	2	–	1
Vermont		–		6	–	3	–	1
Brown		–		6	–	4	–	0
Harvard		–		4	–	3	–	1
Carnegie Tech		–		4	–	3	–	1
Penn		–		5	–	4	–	0
Pittsburgh		–		5	–	4	–	0
Bucknell		–		4	–	4	–	1
Columbia		–		4	–	4	–	1
Duquesne		–		4	–	4	–	0
Princeton		–		3	–	3	–	1
Franklin & Marshall		–		3	–	5	–	1
Drexel		–		2	–	6	–	0
Buffalo		–		2	–	5	–	1
Fordham		–		2	–	7	–	0
Boston University		–		1	–	6	–	0
Villanova		–		0	–	7	–	1
Temple		–		0	–	5	–	0
CCNY		–		0	–	7	–	0
Springfield		–		0	–	7	–	0

The 1923 Providence College football team represented Providence College during the 1923 college football season. In their third year under head coach Fred Huggins, the team compiled a 4–2–1 record and outscored opponents by a total of 76 to 66.

=== Schedule ===
Date	Time	Opponent	Site	Result	Attendance	Source
September 29	3:00 p.m.	at Boston College	Alumni Field; Chestnut Hill, MA	L 0–28	5,000	
October 13		at Holy Cross	Fitton Field; Worcester, MA	L 0–32		
October 20		Coast Guard	Hendricken Field; Providence, RI	W 27–0		
October 27		Catholic	Hendricken Field; Providence, RI	W 7–0		
November 3		New London Submarine Base	Hendricken Field; Providence, RI	W 14–0		
November 10		Massachusetts-Lowell	Hendricken Field; Providence, RI	W 22–0		
November 17		at St. John's (NY)	Ebbetts Field; Brooklyn, NY	T 6–6		
All times are in Eastern time

== 1924 ==
1924 Providence College football
- Conference: Independent
- Record: 4–5–1
- Head coach: Fred Huggins (4th season)

1924 Eastern college football independents records
	Conf.			Overall
Team	W	L	T	W		L		T
No. 9 Dartmouth		–		7	–	0	–	1
No. 3 Yale		–		6	–	0	–	2
No. 8 Penn		–		9	–	1	–	1
Rutgers		–		7	–	1	–	1
Bucknell		–		8	–	2	–	0
Lafayette		–		7	–	2	–	0
Washington & Jefferson		–		7	–	2	–	0
Holy Cross		–		7	–	1	–	1
Army		–		5	–	1	–	2
Syracuse		–		8	–	2	–	1
Fordham		–		6	–	2	–	0
Lehigh		–		4	–	1	–	3
Boston College		–		6	–	3	–	0
Penn State		–		6	–	3	–	1
Princeton		–		4	–	2	–	1
Springfield		–		4	–	2	–	1
Columbia		–		5	–	3	–	1
Pittsburgh		–		5	–	3	–	1
NYU		–		4	–	3	–	1
CCNY		–		4	–	3	–	0
Brown		–		5	–	4	–	0
Carnegie Tech		–		5	–	4	–	0
Colgate		–		5	–	4	–	0
Cornell		–		4	–	4	–	0
Harvard		–		4	–	4	–	0
Tufts		–		3	–	4	–	2
Franklin & Marshall		–		3	–	5	–	1
Villanova		–		2	–	5	–	1
Drexel		–		2	–	7	–	0
Vermont		–		2	–	7	–	0
Temple		–		1	–	4	–	0
Boston University		–		1	–	5	–	0
Buffalo		–		1	–	7	–	0
Rankings from Dickinson System

The 1924 Providence College football team represented Providence College during the 1924 college football season. In their fourth and final year under head coach Fred Huggins, the team compiled a 4–5–1 record and was outscored by a total of 156 to 135.

=== Schedule ===
Date	Time	Opponent	Site	Result	Attendance	Source
September 27	2:30 p.m.	at Boston College	Braves Field; Boston, MA	L 0–47	9,000	
October 4		at Vermont	Centennial Field; Burlington, VT	L 3–13		
October 11		at Massachusetts-Lowell	Lowell, MA	W 6–0		
October 18		Saint Michael's (VT)	Hendricken Field; Providence, RI	W 43–0		
October 25		Saint Stephen's College (NY)	Hendricken Field; Providence, RI	W 9–7		
November 1		at Colgate	Whitnall Field; Hamilton, NY	L 0–42		
November 8		at Springfield	Pratt Field; Springfield, MA	L 0–21		
November 15		New London Submarine Base	Hendricken Field; Providence, RI	T 7–7		
November 22		at St. John's	Ebbets Field; Brooklyn, NY	L 0–19		
November 29		at Cooper Union	Providence, RI	W 67–0		
All times are in Eastern time

== 1925 ==
1925 Providence College football
- Conference: Independent
- Record: 2–7
- Head coach: Archie Golembeski (1st season)

1925 Eastern college football independents records
	Conf.			Overall
Team	W	L	T	W		L		T
No. 1 Dartmouth		–		8	–	0	–	0
Fordham		–		9	–	1	–	0
No. 4 Colgate		–		7	–	0	–	2
No. 10 Pittsburgh		–		8	–	1	–	0
Syracuse		–		8	–	1	–	1
No. 11 Lafayette		–		7	–	1	–	1
Springfield		–		6	–	1	–	1
Princeton		–		5	–	1	–	1
Holy Cross		–		8	–	2	–	0
Penn		–		7	–	2	–	0
Army		–		7	–	2	–	0
Boston College		–		6	–	2	–	0
Cornell		–		6	–	2	–	0
NYU		–		6	–	2	–	1
Villanova		–		6	–	2	–	1
Washington & Jefferson		–		6	–	2	–	1
Carnegie Tech		–		5	–	2	–	1
Yale		–		5	–	2	–	1
Bucknell		–		7	–	3	–	1
Columbia		–		6	–	3	–	1
Muhlenberg		–		6	–	3	–	1
Temple		–		5	–	2	–	2
Harvard		–		4	–	3	–	1
Franklin & Marshall		–		5	–	4	–	0
Brown		–		5	–	4	–	1
Penn State		–		4	–	4	–	1
Buffalo		–		3	–	4	–	1
St. John's		–		3	–	4	–	0
Lehigh		–		3	–	5	–	1
Vermont		–		3	–	6	–	0
CCNY		–		2	–	5	–	0
Providence		–		2	–	7	–	0
Rutgers		–		2	–	7	–	0
Boston University		–		1	–	5	–	0
Manhattan		–		1	–	6	–	1
Tufts		–		1	–	6	–	0
Drexel		–		1	–	7	–	0
Rankings from Dickinson System

The 1925 Providence College football team represented Providence College during the 1925 college football season. In its first year under head coach Archie Golembeski, the team compiled a 2–7 record and was outscored by a total of 197 to 53.

=== Schedule ===
Date	Time	Opponent	Site	Result	Attendance	Source
September 26		at Newport Naval Training Station	Newport News, VA	W 7–0		
October 3		at Fordham	Fordham Field; Bronx, NY	L 6–20		
October 12		at Holy Cross	Fitton Field; Worcester, MA	L 0–22		
October 17		at St. John's	Ebbets Field; Brooklyn, NY	W 14–6		
October 24		at Syracuse	Archbold Stadium; Syracuse, NY	L 0–48	5,000	
October 31		at Boston College	Braves Field; Boston, MA	L 0–51		
November 7		at Colgate	Whitnall Field; Hamilton, NY	L 7–19		
November 14	2:00 p.m.	at Boston University	Fenway Park; Boston, MA	L 6–14		
November 21		at Springfield	Pratt Field; Springfield, MA	L 13–17		
All times are in Eastern time

== 1926 ==
1926 Providence College football
- Conference: Independent
- Record: 4–2–2
- Head coach: Archie Golembeski (2nd season)

1926 Eastern college football independents records
	Conf.			Overall
Team	W	L	T	W		L		T
No. 5 Lafayette		–		9	–	0	–	0
No. 10 Brown		–		9	–	0	–	1
NYU		–		8	–	1	–	0
No. 9 Army		–		7	–	1	–	1
Washington & Jefferson		–		7	–	1	–	1
Boston College		–		6	–	0	–	2
No. 10 Penn		–		7	–	1	–	1
Cornell		–		6	–	1	–	1
Princeton		–		5	–	1	–	1
Carnegie Tech		–		7	–	2	–	0
Springfield		–		6	–	2	–	0
Syracuse		–		7	–	2	–	1
Villanova		–		6	–	2	–	1
Colgate		–		5	–	2	–	2
Columbia		–		6	–	3	–	0
Pittsburgh		–		5	–	2	–	2
CCNY		–		5	–	3	–	0
Temple		–		5	–	3	–	0
Penn State		–		5	–	4	–	0
Tufts		–		4	–	4	–	0
Yale		–		4	–	4	–	0
Bucknell		–		4	–	5	–	1
Fordham		–		3	–	4	–	1
Harvard		–		3	–	5	–	0
Rutgers		–		3	–	6	–	0
Vermont		–		3	–	6	–	0
Drexel		–		2	–	5	–	0
Boston University		–		2	–	6	–	0
Lehigh		–		1	–	8	–	0
Franklin & Marshall		–		0	–	8	–	1
Rankings from Dickinson System

The 1926 Providence College football team represented Providence College during the 1926 college football season. In their second year under head coach Archie Golembeski, the team compiled a 4–2–2 record and was outscored by a total of 105 to 98.

=== Schedule ===
Date	Opponent	Site	Result	Source
September 25	at Williams	Williamstown, MA	W 10–7	
October 2	New London Submarine Base	Cycledrome; Providence, RI	W 34–7	
October 16	Vermont	Cycledrome; Providence, RI	W 21–0	
October 23	Saint John's (NY)	Cycledrome; Providence, RI	T 6–6	
October 30	Quantico Marines	Cycledrome; Providence, RI	L 0–34	
November 6	at Colgate	Whitnall Field; Hamilton, NY	L 0–28	
November 13	Alfred	Cycledrome; Providence, RI	W 14–10	
November 20	at Middlebury	Porter Field; Middlebury, VT	T 13–13	

== 1927 ==
1927 Providence College football
- Conference: Independent
- Record: 1–4–2
- Head coach: Archie Golembeski (3rd season)
- Home stadium: Hendricken Field

1927 Eastern college football independents records
	Conf.			Overall
Team	W	L	T	W		L		T
Tufts		–		8	–	0	–	0
Springfield		–		7	–	0	–	2
Washington & Jefferson		–		7	–	0	–	2
No. 6 Army		–		9	–	1	–	0
No. 2 Pittsburgh		–		8	–	1	–	1
Temple		–		7	–	1	–	0
No. 5 Yale		–		7	–	1	–	0
NYU		–		7	–	1	–	2
Princeton		–		6	–	1	–	0
Villanova		–		6	–	1	–	0
Penn State		–		6	–	2	–	1
Columbia		–		5	–	2	–	2
Bucknell		–		6	–	3	–	1
Colgate		–		4	–	2	–	3
CCNY		–		4	–	2	–	2
Lafayette		–		5	–	3	–	1
Penn		–		6	–	4	–	0
Syracuse		–		5	–	3	–	2
Carnegie Tech		–		5	–	4	–	1
Boston College		–		4	–	4	–	0
Harvard		–		4	–	4	–	0
Rutgers		–		4	–	4	–	0
Cornell		–		3	–	3	–	2
Boston University		–		3	–	4	–	1
Drexel		–		3	–	5	–	1
Fordham		–		3	–	5	–	0
Brown		–		3	–	6	–	1
Vermont		–		2	–	6	–	0
Providence		–		1	–	4	–	2
Franklin & Marshall		–		1	–	7	–	1
Lehigh		–		1	–	7	–	1
Rankings from Dickinson System

The 1927 Providence College football team represented Providence College as an independent during the 1927 college football season. In their third year under head coach Archie Golembeski, the team compiled a 1–4–2 record.

=== Schedule ===
Date	Time	Opponent	Site	Result	Source
October 1		at Springfield	Pratt Field; Springfield, MA	T 0–0	
October 8		Norwich	Hendricken Field; Providence, RI	T 7–7	
October 15		at Vermont	Centennial Field; Burlington, VT	L 0–40	
October 22		St. John's	Hendricken Field; Providence, RI	W 12–6	
October 29		at St. Xavier	Corcoran Field; Cincinnati, OH	L 6–27	
November 5	2:00 p.m.	at Boston University	Tufts Oval; Medford, MA	L 6–33	
November 12		Fordham	Hendricken Field; Providence, RI	L 19–26	
All times are in Eastern time

== 1928 ==
1928 Providence College football
- Conference: Independent
- Record: 1–5–3
- Head coach: Archie Golembeski (4th season)

1928 Eastern college football independents records
	Conf.			Overall
Team	W	L	T	W		L		T
Boston College		–		9	–	0	–	0
West Chester		–		8	–	0	–	0
Villanova		–		7	–	0	–	1
Brown		–		8	–	1	–	0
No. 11 Penn		–		8	–	1	–	0
No. 6 Carnegie Tech		–		7	–	1	–	0
No. 9 Army		–		8	–	2	–	0
Drexel		–		8	–	2	–	0
No. 10 NYU		–		8	–	2	–	0
Temple		–		7	–	1	–	2
Lafayette		–		6	–	1	–	2
Princeton		–		5	–	1	–	2
CCNY		–		4	–	1	–	2
Pittsburgh		–		6	–	2	–	1
Harvard		–		5	–	2	–	1
Tufts		–		5	–	2	–	1
Colgate		–		6	–	3	–	0
Rutgers		–		6	–	3	–	0
Bucknell		–		5	–	2	–	3
Columbia		–		5	–	3	–	1
Boston University		–		3	–	3	–	2
Cornell		–		3	–	3	–	2
Syracuse		–		4	–	4	–	1
Yale		–		4	–	4	–	0
Fordham		–		4	–	5	–	0
Franklin & Marshall		–		4	–	5	–	0
Penn State		–		3	–	5	–	1
Lehigh		–		3	–	6	–	0
Washington & Jefferson		–		2	–	5	–	2
Providence		–		1	–	5	–	3
Vermont		–		1	–	7	–	2
Rankings from Dickinson System

The 1928 Providence College football team represented Providence College as an independent during the 1928 college football season. In their fourth year under head coach Archie Golembeski, the team compiled a 1–5–3 record.

=== Schedule ===
Date	Opponent	Site	Result	Source
September 29	at Williams	Weston Field; Williamstown, MA	L 13–20	
October 6	at Norwich	Sabine Field; Northfield, VT	T 6–6	
October 13	at Army	Michie Stadium; West Point, NY	L 0–44	
October 20	Manhattan	Providence, RI	W 18–7	
October 27	at Temple	Temple Stadium; Philadelphia, PA	L 0–41	
November 3	at St. John's	Ebbets Field; Brooklyn, NY	T 0–0	
November 10	Coast Guard	Providence, RI	T 6–6	
November 17	at Springfield	Pratt Field; Springfield, MA	L 6–13	
November 24	at Holy Cross	Fitton Field; Worcester, MA	L 0–44	

== 1929 ==
1929 Providence Friars football
- Conference: Independent
- Record: 3–3–2
- Head coach: Archie Golembeski (5th season)
- Home stadium: Hendricken Field

1929 Eastern college football independents records
	Conf.			Overall
Team	W	L	T	W		L		T
No. 3 Pittsburgh		–		9	–	1	–	0
Colgate		–		8	–	1	–	0
Fordham		–		7	–	0	–	2
Bucknell		–		8	–	2	–	0
No. 11 Penn		–		7	–	2	–	0
Boston College		–		7	–	2	–	1
Villanova		–		7	–	2	–	1
Cornell		–		6	–	2	–	0
Tufts		–		5	–	1	–	2
Harvard		–		5	–	2	–	1
Yale		–		5	–	2	–	1
NYU		–		7	–	3	–	0
Franklin & Marshall		–		6	–	3	–	0
Penn State		–		6	–	3	–	0
Syracuse		–		6	–	3	–	0
Washington & Jefferson		–		5	–	2	–	2
Drexel		–		6	–	3	–	1
Temple		–		6	–	3	–	1
Carnegie Tech		–		5	–	3	–	1
Army		–		6	–	4	–	1
Providence		–		3	–	3	–	2
Brown		–		5	–	5	–	0
Columbia		–		4	–	5	–	0
CCNY		–		2	–	4	–	2
Princeton		–		2	–	4	–	1
Boston University		–		3	–	6	–	0
Vermont		–		2	–	7	–	0
Rankings from Dickinson System

The 1929 Providence Friars football team represented Providence College as an independent during the 1929 college football season. In their fifth year under head coach Archie Golembeski, the team compiled a 3–3–2 record.

=== Schedule ===
Date	Opponent	Site	Result	Attendance	Source
September 28	at Rutgers	Neilson Field; New Brunswick, NJ	L 0–17	8,000	
October 5	at Holy Cross	Fitton Field; Worcester, MA	L 6–14	8,000	
October 12	Canisius	Hendricken Field; Providence, RI	T 0–0		
October 26	at Colgate	Whitnall Field; Hamilton, NY	L 0–52	5,000	
November 2	Middlebury	Hendricken Field; Providence, RI	W 33–0		
November 9	at Coast Guard	New London, CT	W 32–0		
November 16	St. John's	Hendricken Field; Providence, RI	W 19–6		
November 22	at Lowell Textile	Lowell, MA	T 12–12		
