= Crowl =

Crowl is an English surname. Notable people with this surname include:

- Bernie Crowl (1908–1998), American football player
- Claude Crowl (1892–1915), Australian rules football player and soldier
- Joe Crowl (1883–1915), Australian rules football player and soldier
- Madam Crowl (1870), fictional character in Sheridan Le Fanu's short story "Madam Crowl's Ghost"
- Sid Crowl (1888–1971), English football player
