= Archie Golembeski =

American football player and coach (1900–1976)

No. 23, 22
- Positions: End, guard, center

Personal information
- Born: May 25, 1900; Lyon Mountain, Kentucky, U.S.
- Died: March 9, 1976 (aged 75); Worcester, Massachusetts, U.S.

Career information
- College: Holy Cross

Career history
- Playing career: Providence Steam Roller (1925–1926, 1929); Coaching career: Providence Steam Roller (1925)

Career statistics
- Coaching record: 6–5–1 (NFL)
- Points: 19
- Touchdowns: 3
- Stats at Pro Football Reference
- Coaching profile at Pro Football Reference

Anthony Edward Golembeski (May 25, 1900 – March 9, 1976) was an American professional football player and coach in the National Football League (NFL) for the Providence Steam Roller. He also played at the college level and became an All-East football star while attending Holy Cross. In 1926–27 he coached the Providence College basketball program to its first officially recognized NCAA win in the school history. He served as the head football coach at Providence from 1925 to 1933, compiling a record of 27–34–12.

== Head coaching record ==
=== College football ===
Year	Team	Overall	Conference	Standing	Bowl/playoffs
Providence College / Providence Friars (Independent) (1925–1933)
1925	Providence College	2–7			
1926	Providence College	4–2–2			
1927	Providence College	1–4–2			
1928	Providence College	1–5–3			
1929	Providence	3–3–2			
1930	Providence	3–4–1			
1931	Providence	7–3			
1932	Providence	4–2–2			
1933	Providence	2–4			
Providence College / Providence:		27–34–12			
Total:		27–34–12			
