= 1929 Lehigh Brown and White football team =

American college football season

1929 Lehigh Brown and White football

Middle Three co-champion
- Conference: Middle Three Conference
- Record: 4–3–2 (1–1 Middle Three)
- Head coach: A. Austin Tate (2nd season)
- Captain: Winton Miller
- Home stadium: Taylor Stadium

1929 Middle Three Conference football standings
| | Conf. | | | | | Overall |
| Team | W | | L | | T | W | | L | | T |
|---|---|---|---|---|---|---|---|---|---|---|
| Lehigh + | 1 | – | 1 | – | 0 | 4 | – | 3 | – | 2 |
| Rutgers + | 1 | – | 1 | – | 0 | 5 | – | 4 | – | 0 |
| Lafayette + | 1 | – | 1 | – | 0 | 3 | – | 5 | – | 0 |
$ – Conference champion

The 1929 Lehigh Brown and White football team was an American football team that represented Lehigh University during the 1929 college football season. In its second season under head coach A. Austin Tate, the team compiled a 4–3–2 record. Lehigh played home games at Taylor Stadium in Bethlehem, Pennsylvania.

== Schedule ==
| Date | Opponent | Site | Result | Attendance | Source |
|---|---|---|---|---|---|
| September 28 | Johns Hopkins* | Taylor Stadium; Bethlehem, PA | W 26–0 | 6,000 | |
| October 5 | Pennsylvania Military* | Taylor Stadium; Bethlehem, PA | T 20–20 | | |
| October 12 | at Gettysburg* | Memorial Stadium; Gettysburg, PA | T 7–7 | | |
| October 19 | St. John's* | Taylor Stadium; Bethlehem, PA | W 57–20 | | |
| October 26 | at Penn* | Franklin Field; Philadelphia, PA | L 7–10 | | |
| November 2 | Muhlenberg* | Taylor Stadium; Bethlehem, PA | W 28–7 | | |
| November 9 | at Princeton* | Palmer Stadium; Princeton, NJ | L 0–20 | 25,000 | |
| November 16 | at Rutgers | Neilson Field; New Brunswick, NJ | L 0–14 | 10,000 | |
| November 23 | Lafayette | Taylor Stadium; Bethlehem, PA (rivalry) | W 13–12 | | |
*Non-conference game
