= 1928 Drexel Dragons football team =

American college football season

1928 Drexel Dragons football
- Conference: Independent
- Record: 8–2
- Head coach: Walter Halas (2nd season)
- Captain: Reed Heckman

1928 Eastern college football independents records
	Conf.			Overall
Team	W	L	T	W		L		T
Boston College		–		9	–	0	–	0
West Chester		–		8	–	0	–	0
Villanova		–		7	–	0	–	1
Brown		–		8	–	1	–	0
No. 11 Penn		–		8	–	1	–	0
No. 6 Carnegie Tech		–		7	–	1	–	0
No. 9 Army		–		8	–	2	–	0
Drexel		–		8	–	2	–	0
No. 10 NYU		–		8	–	2	–	0
Temple		–		7	–	1	–	2
Lafayette		–		6	–	1	–	2
Princeton		–		5	–	1	–	2
CCNY		–		4	–	1	–	2
Pittsburgh		–		6	–	2	–	1
Harvard		–		5	–	2	–	1
Tufts		–		5	–	2	–	1
Colgate		–		6	–	3	–	0
Rutgers		–		6	–	3	–	0
Bucknell		–		5	–	2	–	3
Columbia		–		5	–	3	–	1
Boston University		–		3	–	3	–	2
Cornell		–		3	–	3	–	2
Syracuse		–		4	–	4	–	1
Yale		–		4	–	4	–	0
Fordham		–		4	–	5	–	0
Franklin & Marshall		–		4	–	5	–	0
Penn State		–		3	–	5	–	1
Lehigh		–		3	–	6	–	0
Washington & Jefferson		–		2	–	5	–	2
Providence		–		1	–	5	–	3
Vermont		–		1	–	7	–	2
Rankings from Dickinson System

1928 Drexel Dragons football team represented Drexel Institute—now known as Drexel University—in the 1928 college football season. Led by Walter Halas in his second season as head coach, the team compiled a record of 8–2.

== Schedule ==
Date	Opponent	Site	Result	Attendance	Source
September 22	Juniata	Philadelphia, PA	W 13–0		
September 29	at Muhlenberg	Allentown, PA	W 6–3		
October 6	at Delaware	Frazer Field; Newark, DE	W 19–0		
October 13	Susquehanna	Philadelphia, PA	W 38–0		
October 20	at CCNY	Lewisohn Stadium; New York, NY	L 6–26	5,000	
October 27	at Washington College	Chestertown, MD	W 26–0		
November 3	New York Aggies	Philadelphia, PA	W 46–0	300	
November 10	at Ursinus	Collegeville, PA	W 13–0		
November 17	at Haverford	Haverford, PA	W 19–7		
November 24	Saint Joseph's	Philadelphia, PA	L 6–12	7,000	
