= 1928 NYU Violets football team =

American college football season

1928 NYU Violets football
- Conference: Independent
- Record: 8–2
- Head coach: Chick Meehan (4th season)
- Home stadium: Ohio Field; Yankee Stadium

1928 Eastern college football independents records
	Conf.			Overall
Team	W	L	T	W		L		T
Boston College		–		9	–	0	–	0
West Chester		–		8	–	0	–	0
Villanova		–		7	–	0	–	1
Brown		–		8	–	1	–	0
No. 11 Penn		–		8	–	1	–	0
No. 6 Carnegie Tech		–		7	–	1	–	0
No. 9 Army		–		8	–	2	–	0
Drexel		–		8	–	2	–	0
No. 10 NYU		–		8	–	2	–	0
Temple		–		7	–	1	–	2
Lafayette		–		6	–	1	–	2
Princeton		–		5	–	1	–	2
CCNY		–		4	–	1	–	2
Pittsburgh		–		6	–	2	–	1
Harvard		–		5	–	2	–	1
Tufts		–		5	–	2	–	1
Colgate		–		6	–	3	–	0
Rutgers		–		6	–	3	–	0
Bucknell		–		5	–	2	–	3
Columbia		–		5	–	3	–	1
Boston University		–		3	–	3	–	2
Cornell		–		3	–	3	–	2
Syracuse		–		4	–	4	–	1
Yale		–		4	–	4	–	0
Fordham		–		4	–	5	–	0
Franklin & Marshall		–		4	–	5	–	0
Penn State		–		3	–	5	–	1
Lehigh		–		3	–	6	–	0
Washington & Jefferson		–		2	–	5	–	2
Providence		–		1	–	5	–	3
Vermont		–		1	–	7	–	2
Rankings from Dickinson System

The 1928 NYU Violets football team was an American football team that represented New York University as an independent during the 1928 college football season. In their fourth year under head coach Chick Meehan, the team compiled a 8–2 record. NYU back Ken Strong led the nation in scoring, on his way to garnering first-team All-American honors. The team was ranked No. 10 in the nation in the final Dickinson System ratings released in December 1928.

== Schedule ==
Date	Opponent	Site	Result	Attendance	Source
September 29	Niagara	Ohio Field; Bronx, NY	W 21–0	13,000	
October 6	West Virginia Wesleyan	Ohio Field; Bronx, NY	W 26–7	17,500	
October 13	vs. Fordham	Polo Grounds; New York, NY	W 34–7	50,000	
October 20	Rutgers	Yankee Stadium; Bronx, NY	W 48–0	22,500	
October 27	Colgate	Yankee Stadium; Bronx, NY	W 47–6	52,000	
November 3	Georgetown	Yankee Stadium; Bronx, NY	L 2–7	50,000	
November 10	Alfred	Ohio Field; Bronx, NY	W 71–0		
November 17	Missouri	Yankee Stadium; Bronx, NY	W 27–6		
November 24	at Carnegie Tech	Forbes Field; Pittsburgh, PA	W 27–13		
November 29	Oregon State	Yankee Stadium; Bronx, NY	L 13–25	40,000	
