= 1928 Princeton Tigers football team =

American college football season

1928 Princeton Tigers football
- Conference: Independent
- Record: 5–1–2
- Head coach: Bill Roper (15th season)
- Captain: Charles Howe
- Home stadium: Palmer Stadium

1928 Eastern college football independents records
	Conf.			Overall
Team	W	L	T	W		L		T
Boston College		–		9	–	0	–	0
West Chester		–		8	–	0	–	0
Villanova		–		7	–	0	–	1
Brown		–		8	–	1	–	0
No. 11 Penn		–		8	–	1	–	0
No. 6 Carnegie Tech		–		7	–	1	–	0
No. 9 Army		–		8	–	2	–	0
Drexel		–		8	–	2	–	0
No. 10 NYU		–		8	–	2	–	0
Temple		–		7	–	1	–	2
Lafayette		–		6	–	1	–	2
Princeton		–		5	–	1	–	2
CCNY		–		4	–	1	–	2
Pittsburgh		–		6	–	2	–	1
Harvard		–		5	–	2	–	1
Tufts		–		5	–	2	–	1
Colgate		–		6	–	3	–	0
Rutgers		–		6	–	3	–	0
Bucknell		–		5	–	2	–	3
Columbia		–		5	–	3	–	1
Boston University		–		3	–	3	–	2
Cornell		–		3	–	3	–	2
Syracuse		–		4	–	4	–	1
Yale		–		4	–	4	–	0
Fordham		–		4	–	5	–	0
Franklin & Marshall		–		4	–	5	–	0
Penn State		–		3	–	5	–	1
Lehigh		–		3	–	6	–	0
Washington & Jefferson		–		2	–	5	–	2
Providence		–		1	–	5	–	3
Vermont		–		1	–	7	–	2
Rankings from Dickinson System

The 1928 Princeton Tigers football team represented Princeton University in the 1928 college football season. The Tigers finished with a 5–1–2 record under 15th-year head coach Bill Roper. Princeton center Charles Howe was selected by the Associated Press as a first-team honoree on the 1928 College Football All-America Team.

== Schedule ==
Date	Opponent	Site	Result	Attendance	Source
October 6	Vermont	Palmer Stadium; Princeton, NJ	W 50–0		
October 13	Virginia	Palmer Stadium; Princeton, NJ	T 0–0		
October 20	Lehigh	Palmer Stadium; Princeton, NJ	W 47–0		
October 27	Cornell	Palmer Stadium; Princeton, NJ	W 3–0		
November 3	at Ohio State	Ohio Stadium; Columbus, OH	T 6–6	74,000	
November 10	Washington and Lee	Palmer Stadium; Princeton, NJ	W 25–12		
November 17	Yale	Palmer Stadium; Princeton, NJ (rivalry)	W 12–2	60,000	
November 24	vs. Navy	Franklin Field; Philadelphia, PA	L 0–9		
