= 1929 Lafayette Leopards football team =

American football club

1929 Lafayette Leopards football

Middle Three co-champion
- Conference: Middle Three Conference
- Record: 3–5 (1–1 Middle Three)
- Head coach: Herb McCracken (6th season)
- Captain: William Sherwood
- Home stadium: Fisher Field

1929 Middle Three Conference football standings
	Conf.					Overall
Team	W		L		T	W		L		T
Lehigh +	1	–	1	–	0	4	–	3	–	2
Rutgers +	1	–	1	–	0	5	–	4	–	0
Lafayette +	1	–	1	–	0	3	–	5	–	0
$ – Conference champion

The 1929 Lafayette Leopards football team was an American football team that represented Lafayette College in the Middle Three Conference during the 1929 college football season. In its sixth season under head coach Herb McCracken, the team compiled a 3–5 record. William Sherwood was the team captain.

== Schedule ==
Date	Opponent	Site	Result	Attendance	Source
October 5	Muhlenberg*	Fisher Field; Easton, PA	W 23–0		
October 12	Manhattan*	Fisher Field; Easton, PA	W 23–0		
October 19	Bucknell*	Fisher Field; Easton, PA	L 3–6		
October 26	at Penn State*	New Beaver Field; State College, PA	L 3–6	10,000	
November 2	at Washington & Jefferson*	Cameron Stadium; Washington, PA	L 0–20		
November 9	Rutgers	Fisher Field; Easton, PA	W 20–6		
November 16	at Temple*	Temple Stadium; Philadelphia, PA	L 0–13		
November 23	at Lehigh	Taylor Stadium; Bethlethem, PA (rivalry)	L 12–13		
*Non-conference game
