= 1928 Colgate football team =

American college football season

1928 Colgate football
- Conference: Independent
- Record: 6–3
- Head coach: Earl Abell (1st season)
- Captain: Bruce DuMont

1928 Eastern college football independents records
	Conf.			Overall
Team	W	L	T	W		L		T
Boston College		–		9	–	0	–	0
West Chester		–		8	–	0	–	0
Villanova		–		7	–	0	–	1
Brown		–		8	–	1	–	0
No. 11 Penn		–		8	–	1	–	0
No. 6 Carnegie Tech		–		7	–	1	–	0
No. 9 Army		–		8	–	2	–	0
Drexel		–		8	–	2	–	0
No. 10 NYU		–		8	–	2	–	0
Temple		–		7	–	1	–	2
Lafayette		–		6	–	1	–	2
Princeton		–		5	–	1	–	2
CCNY		–		4	–	1	–	2
Pittsburgh		–		6	–	2	–	1
Harvard		–		5	–	2	–	1
Tufts		–		5	–	2	–	1
Colgate		–		6	–	3	–	0
Rutgers		–		6	–	3	–	0
Bucknell		–		5	–	2	–	3
Columbia		–		5	–	3	–	1
Boston University		–		3	–	3	–	2
Cornell		–		3	–	3	–	2
Syracuse		–		4	–	4	–	1
Yale		–		4	–	4	–	0
Fordham		–		4	–	5	–	0
Franklin & Marshall		–		4	–	5	–	0
Penn State		–		3	–	5	–	1
Lehigh		–		3	–	6	–	0
Washington & Jefferson		–		2	–	5	–	2
Providence		–		1	–	5	–	3
Vermont		–		1	–	7	–	2
Rankings from Dickinson System

The 1928 Colgate football team was an American football team that represented Colgate University as an independent during the 1928 college football season. In it first season under head coach Earl Abell, Colgate compiled a 6–3 record and outscored opponents by a total of 175 to 107.

== Schedule ==
Date	Opponent	Site	Result	Attendance	Source
September 29	St. Lawrence	Hamilton, NY	W 33–6		
October 6	at Vanderbilt	Dudley Field; Nashville, TN	L 7–12		
October 13	VPI	Hamilton, NY	W 35–14		
October 20	at Michigan State	College Field; East Lansing, MI	W 16–0	10,000	
October 27	at NYU	Yankee Stadium; Bronx, NY	L 6–47	52,000	
November 3	Wabash	Hamilton, NY	W 14–6		
November 10	Hobart	Hamilton, NY	W 21–0		
November 17	at Syracuse	Archbold Stadium; Syracuse, NY	W 30–6		
November 29	at Brown	Brown Stadium; Providence, RI	L 13–16		
