= 1928 Penn Quakers football team =

American college football season

1928 Penn Quakers football
- Conference: Independent
- Record: 8–1
- Head coach: Lou Young (6th season)
- Captain: Paul Scull
- Home stadium: Franklin Field

1928 Eastern college football independents records
	Conf.			Overall
Team	W	L	T	W		L		T
Boston College		–		9	–	0	–	0
West Chester		–		8	–	0	–	0
Villanova		–		7	–	0	–	1
Brown		–		8	–	1	–	0
No. 11 Penn		–		8	–	1	–	0
No. 6 Carnegie Tech		–		7	–	1	–	0
No. 9 Army		–		8	–	2	–	0
Drexel		–		8	–	2	–	0
No. 10 NYU		–		8	–	2	–	0
Temple		–		7	–	1	–	2
Lafayette		–		6	–	1	–	2
Princeton		–		5	–	1	–	2
CCNY		–		4	–	1	–	2
Pittsburgh		–		6	–	2	–	1
Harvard		–		5	–	2	–	1
Tufts		–		5	–	2	–	1
Colgate		–		6	–	3	–	0
Rutgers		–		6	–	3	–	0
Bucknell		–		5	–	2	–	3
Columbia		–		5	–	3	–	1
Boston University		–		3	–	3	–	2
Cornell		–		3	–	3	–	2
Syracuse		–		4	–	4	–	1
Yale		–		4	–	4	–	0
Fordham		–		4	–	5	–	0
Franklin & Marshall		–		4	–	5	–	0
Penn State		–		3	–	5	–	1
Lehigh		–		3	–	6	–	0
Washington & Jefferson		–		2	–	5	–	2
Providence		–		1	–	5	–	3
Vermont		–		1	–	7	–	2
Rankings from Dickinson System

The 1928 Penn Quakers football team was an American football team that represented the University of Pennsylvania as an independent during the 1928 college football season. In their sixth season under head coach Lou Young, the Quakers compiled an 8–1 record, shut out six of nine opponents, and outscored all opponents by a total of 271 to 26. The team was ranked No. 11 in the nation in the Dickinson System ratings released in December 1928. The team played its home games at Franklin Field in Philadelphia.

== Schedule ==
Date	Opponent	Site	Result	Attendance	Source
September 29	Ursinus	Franklin Field; Philadelphia, PA	W 34–0		
October 6	Franklin & Marshall	Franklin Field; Philadelphia, PA	W 46–0		
October 13	Swarthmore	Franklin Field; Philadelphia, PA	W 67–0		
October 20	Penn State	Franklin Field; Philadelphia, PA	W 14–0	65,000	
October 27	Navy	Franklin Field; Philadelphia, PA	L 0–6	75,000	
November 3	at Chicago	Stagg Field; Chicago, IL	W 20–13		
November 10	at Harvard	Harvard Stadium; Boston, MA (rivalry)	W 7–0		
November 17	Columbia	Franklin Field; Philadelphia, PA	W 34–7	45,000	
November 29	Cornell	Franklin Field; Philadelphia, PA (rivalry)	W 49–0		
