= 1928 Vermont Catamounts football team =

American college football season

1928 Vermont Catamounts football
- Conference: Independent
- Record: 1–7–2
- Head coach: William V. Rattan (1st season)
- Home stadium: Centennial Field

1928 Eastern college football independents records
	Conf.			Overall
Team	W	L	T	W		L		T
Boston College		–		9	–	0	–	0
West Chester		–		8	–	0	–	0
Villanova		–		7	–	0	–	1
Brown		–		8	–	1	–	0
No. 11 Penn		–		8	–	1	–	0
No. 6 Carnegie Tech		–		7	–	1	–	0
No. 9 Army		–		8	–	2	–	0
Drexel		–		8	–	2	–	0
No. 10 NYU		–		8	–	2	–	0
Temple		–		7	–	1	–	2
Lafayette		–		6	–	1	–	2
Princeton		–		5	–	1	–	2
CCNY		–		4	–	1	–	2
Pittsburgh		–		6	–	2	–	1
Harvard		–		5	–	2	–	1
Tufts		–		5	–	2	–	1
Colgate		–		6	–	3	–	0
Rutgers		–		6	–	3	–	0
Bucknell		–		5	–	2	–	3
Columbia		–		5	–	3	–	1
Boston University		–		3	–	3	–	2
Cornell		–		3	–	3	–	2
Syracuse		–		4	–	4	–	1
Yale		–		4	–	4	–	0
Fordham		–		4	–	5	–	0
Franklin & Marshall		–		4	–	5	–	0
Penn State		–		3	–	5	–	1
Lehigh		–		3	–	6	–	0
Washington & Jefferson		–		2	–	5	–	2
Providence		–		1	–	5	–	3
Vermont		–		1	–	7	–	2
Rankings from Dickinson System

The 1928 Vermont Catamounts football team was an American football team that represented the University of Vermont as an independent during the 1928 college football season. In their first year under head coach William V. Rattan, the team compiled a 1–7–2 record.

== Schedule ==
Date	Opponent	Site	Result	Attendance	Source
September 29	at Columbia	Baker Field; New York, NY	L 0–20	10,000	
October 6	at Princeton	Palmer Stadium; Princeton, NJ	L 0–50		
October 13	Boston University	Centennial Field; Burlington, VT	L 0–25		
October 20	at Union (NY)	Alexander Field; Schenectady, NY	L 6–7		
October 27	Connecticut	Centennial Field; Burlington, VT	L 0–6		
November 3	Norwich	Centennial Field; Burlington, VT	T 0–0		
November 10	at RPI	'86 Field; Troy, NY	L 6–9		
November 17	at Middlebury	Porter Field; Middlebury, VT	T 6–6		
November 24	Burlington Medics	Centennial Field; Burlington, VT	W 13–0		
November 29	at Springfield (MA)	Pratt Field; Springfield, MA	L 0–3	3,000	
