= 1928 Carnegie Tech Tartans football team =

American college football season

1928 Carnegie Tech Tartans football
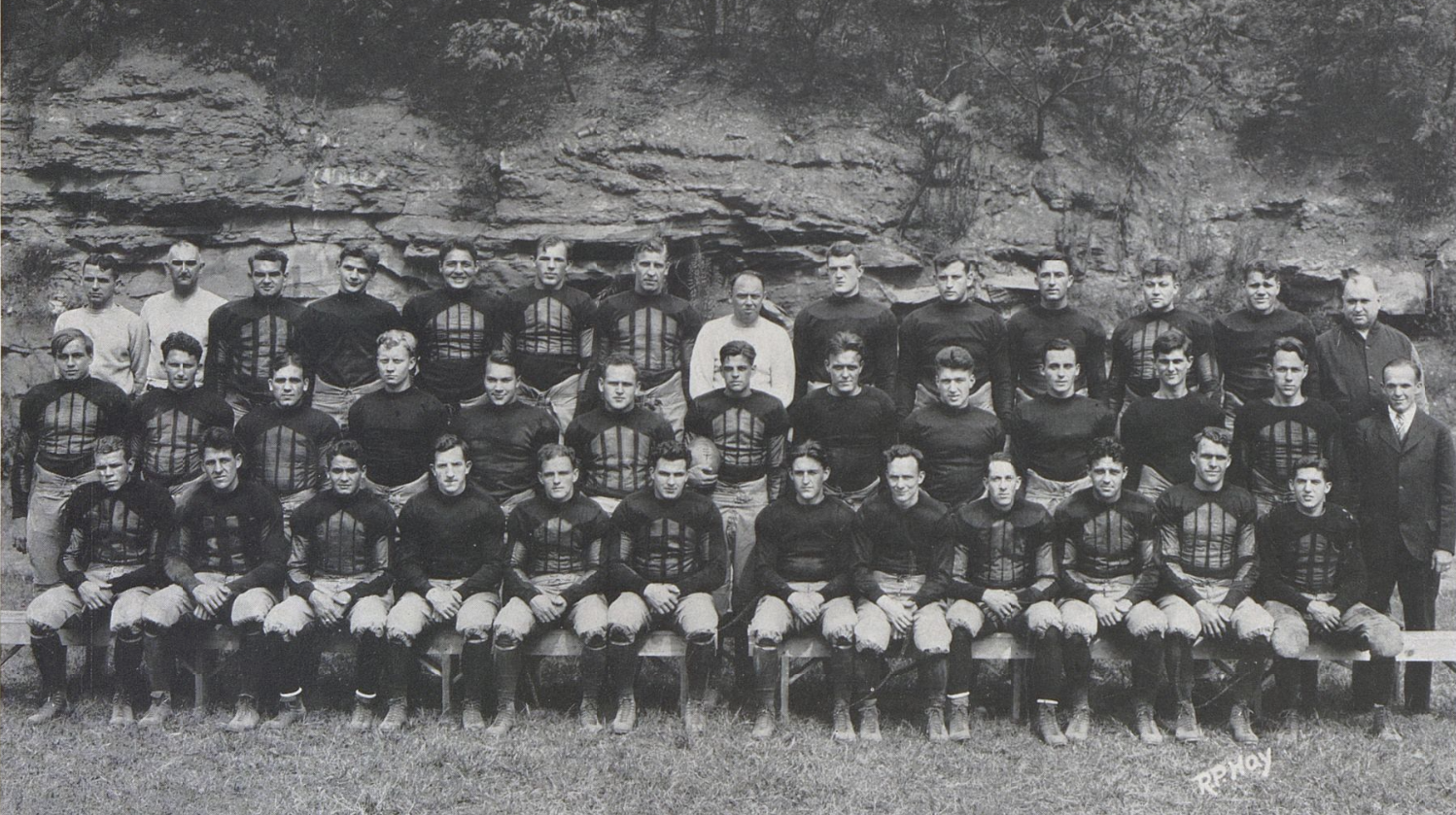
- Official portrait, 1928 Carnegie Tech team
- Conference: Independent
- Record: 7–1
- Head coach: Walter Steffen (14th season)
- Captain: Howard Harpster
- Home stadium: Forbes Field

1928 Eastern college football independents records
| | Conf. | | | Overall |
| Team | W | L | T | W | | L | | T |
|---|---|---|---|---|---|---|---|---|
| Boston College | | – | | 9 | – | 0 | – | 0 |
| West Chester | | – | | 8 | – | 0 | – | 0 |
| Villanova | | – | | 7 | – | 0 | – | 1 |
| Brown | | – | | 8 | – | 1 | – | 0 |
| No. 11 Penn | | – | | 8 | – | 1 | – | 0 |
| No. 6 Carnegie Tech | | – | | 7 | – | 1 | – | 0 |
| No. 9 Army | | – | | 8 | – | 2 | – | 0 |
| Drexel | | – | | 8 | – | 2 | – | 0 |
| No. 10 NYU | | – | | 8 | – | 2 | – | 0 |
| Temple | | – | | 7 | – | 1 | – | 2 |
| Lafayette | | – | | 6 | – | 1 | – | 2 |
| Princeton | | – | | 5 | – | 1 | – | 2 |
| CCNY | | – | | 4 | – | 1 | – | 2 |
| Pittsburgh | | – | | 6 | – | 2 | – | 1 |
| Harvard | | – | | 5 | – | 2 | – | 1 |
| Tufts | | – | | 5 | – | 2 | – | 1 |
| Colgate | | – | | 6 | – | 3 | – | 0 |
| Rutgers | | – | | 6 | – | 3 | – | 0 |
| Bucknell | | – | | 5 | – | 2 | – | 3 |
| Columbia | | – | | 5 | – | 3 | – | 1 |
| Boston University | | – | | 3 | – | 3 | – | 2 |
| Cornell | | – | | 3 | – | 3 | – | 2 |
| Syracuse | | – | | 4 | – | 4 | – | 1 |
| Yale | | – | | 4 | – | 4 | – | 0 |
| Fordham | | – | | 4 | – | 5 | – | 0 |
| Franklin & Marshall | | – | | 4 | – | 5 | – | 0 |
| Penn State | | – | | 3 | – | 5 | – | 1 |
| Lehigh | | – | | 3 | – | 6 | – | 0 |
| Washington & Jefferson | | – | | 2 | – | 5 | – | 2 |
| Providence | | – | | 1 | – | 5 | – | 3 |
| Vermont | | – | | 1 | – | 7 | – | 2 |
Rankings from Dickinson System

The 1928 Carnegie Tech Tartans football team was an American football team that represented the Carnegie Institute of Technology (now known as Carnegie Mellon University) as an independent during the 1928 college football season. In their 14th year under head coach Walter Steffen, the Tartans compiled a 7–1 record, outscored opponents by a total of 214 to 54, and were ranked No. 6 in the nation in the final Dickinson System ratings released in December 1928. They were undefeated through the first seven games (including four shutouts) but lost to NYU by a 27–13 score in the final game of the season.

On November 17, Carnegie Tech beat Notre Dame, 27–7, on Notre Dame's home field. It was the first time the Fighting Irish had been defeated at home in 23 years. Arch Ward of the Chicago Tribune wrote that Carnegie Tech quarterback and captain Howard Harpster was "a wonder", passing, punting, and carrying the ball for long gains.

At the end of the season, United Press (UP) sports editor Frank Getty called Harpster the "most brilliant of modern field generals" and "the greatest quarterback of a generation of football stars." Harpster was a consenus first-team pick at quarterback on the 1928 All-America college football team. Harpster, end Theodore Rosenzweig, and guard John Dreshar received first-team honors from the Associated Press and/or United Press on the 1928 All-Eastern football team.

The Tartans played their home games at Forbes Field in Pittsburgh.

== Schedule ==
| Date | Opponent | Site | Result | Attendance | Source |
|---|---|---|---|---|---|
| September 29 | Westminster (PA) | Rayen Field; Youngstown, OH | W 32-6 | | |
| October 6 | Ashland | Forbes Field; Pittsburgh, PA | W 65–0 | | |
| October 13 | Thiel | Forbes Field; Pittsburgh, PA | W 39–13 | | |
| October 20 | Washington & Jefferson | Forbes Field; Pittsburgh, PA | W 19–0 | | |
| October 27 | at Pittsburgh | Pitt Stadium; Pittsburgh, PA | W 6–0 | 45,000 | |
| November 10 | vs. Georgetown | Chadwick Field; Albany, NY | W 13–0 | 2,000 | |
| November 17 | at Notre Dame | Cartier Field; Notre Dame, IN | W 27–7 | 26,000–30,000 | |
| November 24 | NYU | Forbes Field; Pittsburgh, PA | L 13–27 | 40,000 | |

== Personnel ==
=== Letter winners ===
The following 21 players won varsity letters for their role on the 1928 Carnegie Tech football team:

- John Dreshar, guard, 185 pounds, 5' 10"
- English
- Howard "Dutch" Eyth, halfback, 166 pounds, 5'10"
- Latham Flanagan, end, 186 pounds, 6'1"
- Thayer Flanagan, halfback, 165 pounds, 6'
- Howard Harpster, quarterback and captain, 150 pounds, 6'
- John M. "Tank" Highberger, tackle, 195 pounds, 6'1"
- John Karcis, fullback, 223 pounds, 5'8" (later played nine years in NFL and head coach of the 1942 Detroit Lions)
- W.S. Kuosman, end, 173 pounds, 5'11-1/2"
- C.J. Letzelter, halfback, 185 pounds, 5'10-1/2"
- Donald J. Lovewell, guard, 200 pounds, 6'
- Marshall
- Saul Mielziner, center, 235 pounds, 6'1-1/2" (later played six years in NFL)
- Glenn Moorhead, halfback, 150 pounds, 5'10"
- Theodore "Ted" Rosenzweig, end, 185 pounds, 5'11:
- Robert A. "Gus" Schmidt, tackle, 200 pounds, 6' 2-1/2"
- Leonard J. Schnupp, tackle, 210 pounds, 6' 3"
- Harvey C. "Shag" Shaughency, end, 163 pounds, 6'
- J.C. Stauffer, quarterback, 162 pounds, 5' 8-3/4"
- Anthony G. "Tony" Sweet, end, 162 pounds, 5'10"
- Andrew Yerina, tackle, 190 pounds, 6'

=== Coaching staff ===
- Head coach: Walter Steffen
- Assistant coaches: Bob Waddell, Doc Marks
- Trainer: Bert Munhall
- Manager: R.H. Buckley

=== Gallery ===
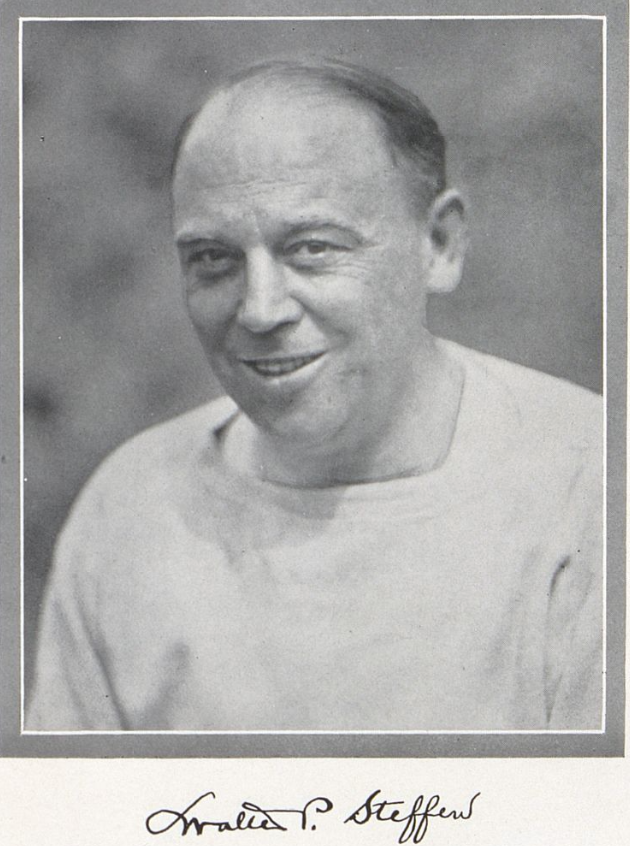
Walter Steffen

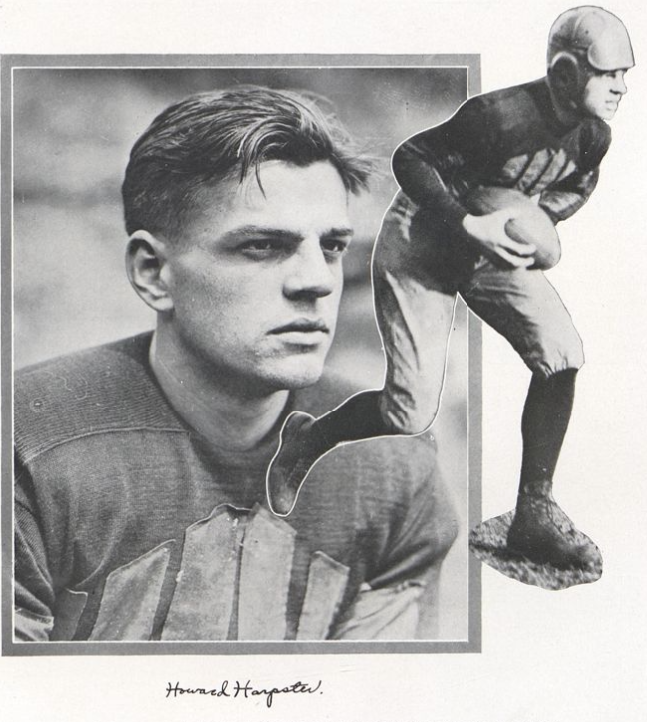
Howard Harpster

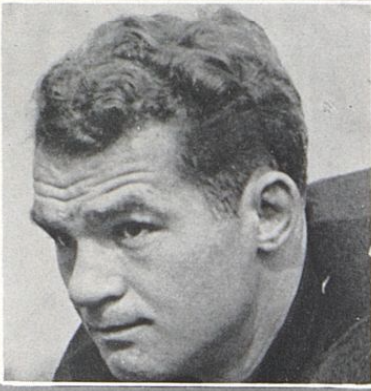
John Dreshar

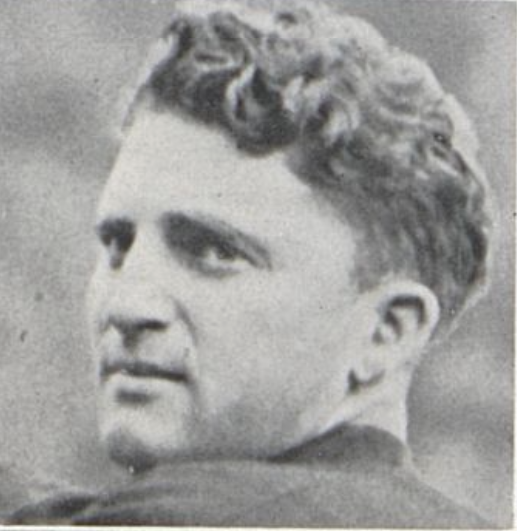
Ted Rosenzweig

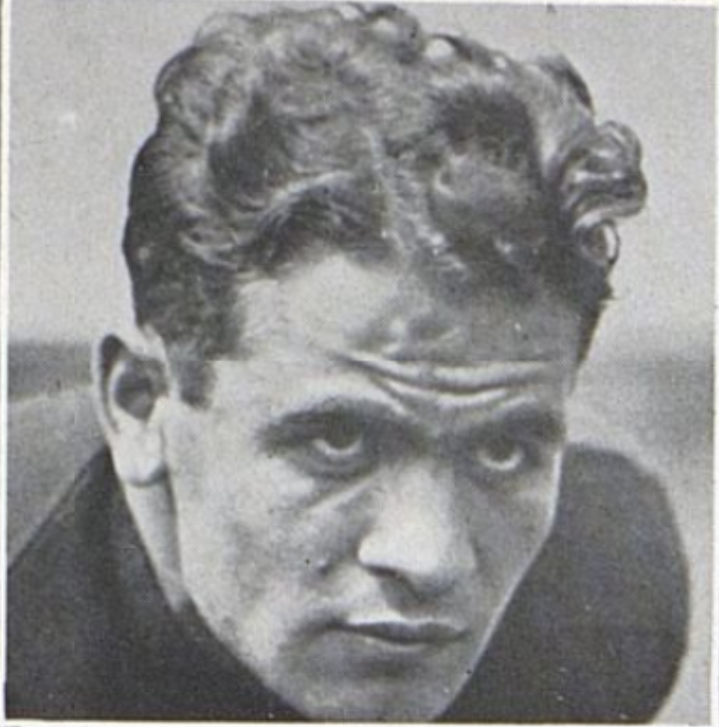
Tony Sweet

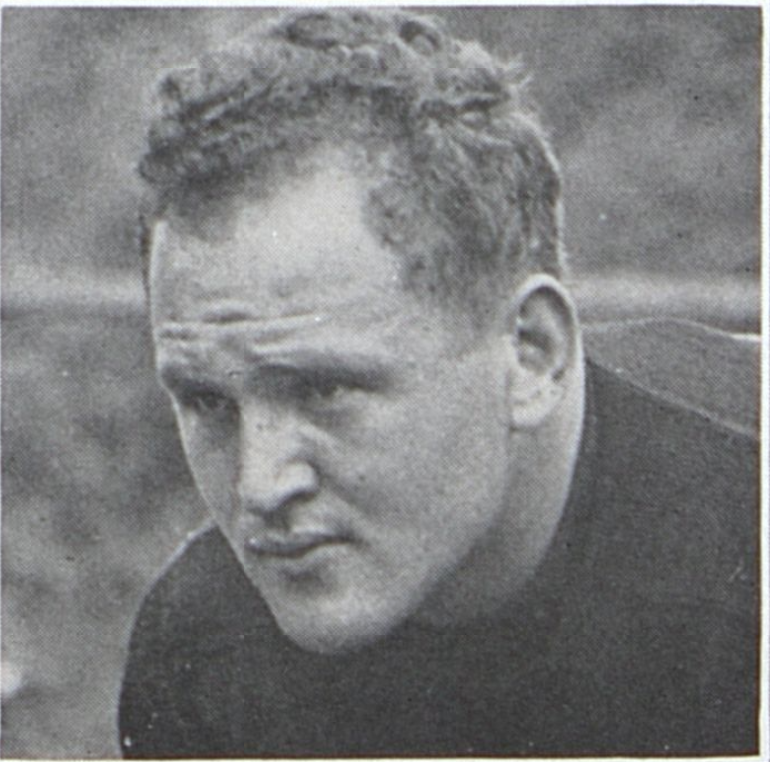
John Karcis

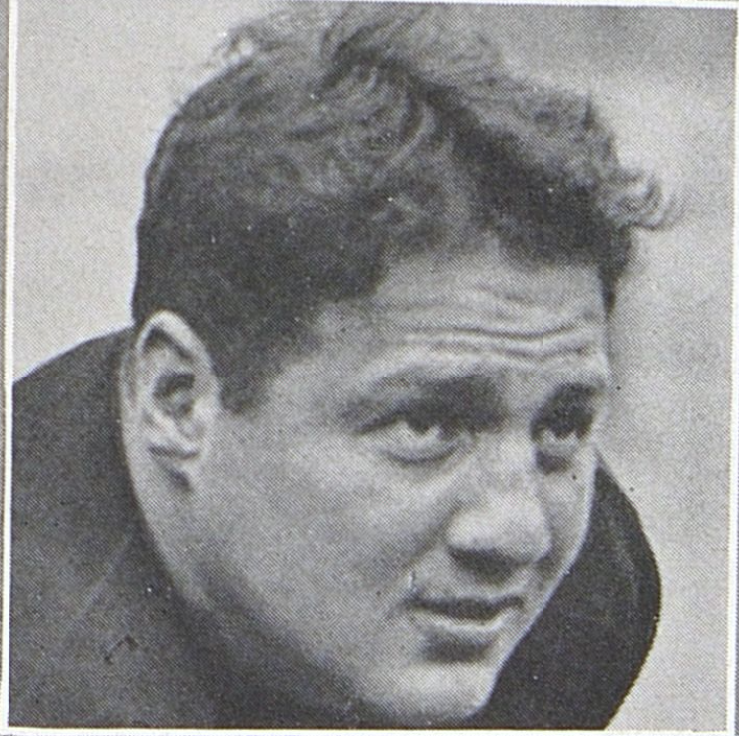
Saul Mielziner
