= Fred Huggins =

American football player and coach (1899–1976)

Biographical details
- Born: March 6, 1899
- Died: July 15, 1976 (aged 77); Newport, Rhode Island, U.S.

Playing career
- 1916: Brown
- 1918: Brown
- Position: Guard

Coaching career (HC unless noted)
- 1921–1924: Providence
- 1928: Newport Naval
- 1930: Navy (assistant)

Accomplishments and honors

Awards
- Third-team All-American (1918)

Frederick Anthony Huggins (March 6, 1899 – July 15, 1976) was an American football player and coach. He served as the head football coach at Providence College in Providence, Rhode Island from 1921 to 1924, compiling a record of 15–15–2. Huggins was named to the 1918 College Football All-America Team as a guard while playing for Brown University.

Huggins entered the United States Army Air Forces in 1942. After serving in the Pacific War during World War II, he was discharged four years later with the rank of major. Huggins worked for the Veterans Administration from 1946 until his retirement in 1965. He died on July 15, 1976, at his home in Newport, Rhode Island.

== Head coaching record ==
=== College football ===
Year	Team	Overall	Conference	Standing	Bowl/playoffs
Providence Friars (Independent) (1921–1924)
1921	Providence	2–4			
1922	Providence	5–4			
1923	Providence	4–2–1			
1924	Providence	4–5–1			
Providence:		15–15–2			
Total:		15–15–2			
