= 1928 Penn State Nittany Lions football team =

American college football season

1928 Penn State Nittany Lions football
- Conference: Independent
- Record: 3–5–1
- Head coach: Hugo Bezdek (11th season)
- Captain: Donn Greenshields; Steven Hamas
- Home stadium: New Beaver Field

1928 Eastern college football independents records
	Conf.			Overall
Team	W	L	T	W		L		T
Boston College		–		9	–	0	–	0
West Chester		–		8	–	0	–	0
Villanova		–		7	–	0	–	1
Brown		–		8	–	1	–	0
No. 11 Penn		–		8	–	1	–	0
No. 6 Carnegie Tech		–		7	–	1	–	0
No. 9 Army		–		8	–	2	–	0
Drexel		–		8	–	2	–	0
No. 10 NYU		–		8	–	2	–	0
Temple		–		7	–	1	–	2
Lafayette		–		6	–	1	–	2
Princeton		–		5	–	1	–	2
CCNY		–		4	–	1	–	2
Pittsburgh		–		6	–	2	–	1
Harvard		–		5	–	2	–	1
Tufts		–		5	–	2	–	1
Colgate		–		6	–	3	–	0
Rutgers		–		6	–	3	–	0
Bucknell		–		5	–	2	–	3
Columbia		–		5	–	3	–	1
Boston University		–		3	–	3	–	2
Cornell		–		3	–	3	–	2
Syracuse		–		4	–	4	–	1
Yale		–		4	–	4	–	0
Fordham		–		4	–	5	–	0
Franklin & Marshall		–		4	–	5	–	0
Penn State		–		3	–	5	–	1
Lehigh		–		3	–	6	–	0
Washington & Jefferson		–		2	–	5	–	2
Providence		–		1	–	5	–	3
Vermont		–		1	–	7	–	2
Rankings from Dickinson System

Donn Greenshields, 1928 Penn State football captain

The 1928 Penn State Nittany Lions football team represented the Pennsylvania State University as an independent during the 1928 college football season. The team was coached by Hugo Bezdek and played its home games in New Beaver Field in State College, Pennsylvania.

== Schedule ==
Date	Opponent	Site	Result	Attendance	Source
September 29	Lebanon Valley	New Beaver Field; State College, PA	W 25–0	4,000	
October 6	Gettysburg	New Beaver Field; State College, PA	W 12–0	5,000	
October 13	Bucknell	New Beaver Field; State College, PA	L 0–6	> 10,000	
October 20	at Penn	Franklin Field; Philadelphia, PA	L 0–14	65,000	
October 27	Syracuse^{†}	New Beaver Field; State College, PA (rivalry)	T 6–6	15,000	
November 3	vs. Notre Dame	Franklin Field; Philadelphia, PA (rivalry)	L 0–9	30,000	
November 10	George Washington	New Beaver Field; State College, PA	W 50–0	5,000	
November 17	at Lafayette	Fisher Field; Easton, PA	L 0–7		
November 29	at Pittsburgh	Pitt Stadium; Pittsburgh, PA (rivalry)	L 0–26	32,209	
^{†}Homecoming
