= Herb McCracken =

American football player and coach (1899–1995)

Biographical details
- Born: June 20, 1899; Pittsburgh, Pennsylvania, U.S.
- Died: March 11, 1995 (aged 95); Ocean Ridge, Florida, U.S.

Playing career
- 1918–1920: Pittsburgh
- Position: Halfback

Coaching career (HC unless noted)
- 1921–1923: Allegheny
- 1924–1935: Lafayette

Head coaching record
- Overall: 75–48–7

Accomplishments and honors

Championships
- As coach: National (1926); 3 Middle Three Conference (1929–1931); As player: National (1918)

Awards
- Amos Alonzo Stagg Award (1988)
- College Football Hall of Fame; Inducted in 1973 (profile)

George Herbert McCracken (June 20, 1899 – March 11, 1995) was an American football player and coach. McCracken played football as a running back at the University of Pittsburgh from 1918 to 1920 under coach "Pop" Warner and was a member of Pittsburgh's 1918 national championship team.

He served as the head coach at Allegheny College from 1921 to 1923 and at Lafayette College from 1924 to 1935, compiling a career college football record of 75–48–7. His 1926 Lafayette Leopards team was recognized as a national champion by Parke H. Davis. That same year his former coach's Pop Warner's Stanford Indians were recognized as the national champions by a different publication.

He was inducted into the College Football Hall of Fame as a coach in 1973. Some, including Pop Warner, consider him to be the first to regularly implement the offensive team huddle, beginning its use in Lafayette in 1924 to hide his instructions from the opposing team.

During his coaching days, McCracken was the cofounder of the very successful Scholastic Inc publishing concern, which he was associated with for 63 years. He was also a brother of the Delta Tau Delta fraternity while he was a student at the University of Pittsburgh.

== Head coaching record ==
Year	Team	Overall	Conference	Standing	Bowl/playoffs
Allegheny Gators (Independent) (1921–1923)
1921	Allegheny	3–4–1			
1922	Allegheny	6–3			
1923	Allegheny	7–1			
Allegheny:		16–8–1			
Lafayette Leopards (Independent) (1924–1928)
1924	Lafayette	7–2			
1925	Lafayette	7–1–1			
1926	Lafayette	9–0			
1927	Lafayette	5–3–1			
1928	Lafayette	6–1–2			
Lafayette Leopards (Middle Three Conference) (1929–1935)
1929	Lafayette	3–5	1–1	T–1st	
1930	Lafayette	5–3–1	2–0	1st	
1931	Lafayette	7–2	2–0	1st	
1932	Lafayette	3–5	1–1	2nd	
1933	Lafayette	3–5–1	1–1	2nd	
1934	Lafayette	2–6	0–2	3rd	
1935	Lafayette	2–7	0–2	3rd	
Lafayette:		59–40–6	7–7		
Total:		75–48–7			
National championship Conference title Conference division title or championship game berth
