= A. Austin Tate =

American football player and coach (1894–1943)

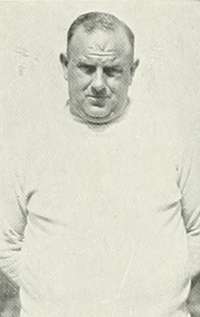
- Tate pictured in Epitome 1934, Lehigh yearbook

Biographical details
- Born: February 14, 1894; Boston, Massachusetts, U.S.
- Died: August 7, 1943 (aged 49); Bethlehem, Pennsylvania, U.S.

Playing career
- 1912–1915: Lehigh
- Position: Tackle

Coaching career (HC unless noted)
- 1922–1926: Liberty HS (PA)
- 1927: Lehigh (freshman)
- 1928–1933: Lehigh
- 1936–1939: Bloomsburg

Head coaching record
- Overall: 23–58–4 (college)

Accomplishments and honors

Championships
- 1 Middle Three (1929)

Albert Austin "Austy" Tate (February 14, 1894 – August 7, 1943) was an American football player and coach. He served as the head football coach at Lehigh University from 1928 to 1933 and at Bloomsburg University of Pennsylvania from 1936 to 1939, compiling a career college football head coaching record of 23–58–4. Tate was an alumnus of Lehigh, Class of 1917.

== Coaching career ==
Tate served as the 17th head football coach at Lehigh University in Bethlehem, Pennsylvania and he held that position for six seasons, from 1928 until 1933. His record at Lehigh was 18–33–3 ties. He had been the head coach at nearby Bethlehem High School for six seasons, from 1921 to 1926.

== Death ==
Tate died unexpectedly on August 7, 1943, in Bethlehem, Pennsylvania, at the age of 49.

== Head coaching record ==
=== College ===
Year	Team	Overall	Conference	Standing	Bowl/playoffs
Lehigh Brown and White (Independent) (1928)
1928	Lehigh	3–6			
Lehigh Brown and White / Engineers (Middle Three Conference) (1929–1933)
1929	Lehigh	4–3–2	1–1	T–1st	
1930	Lehigh	4–5	0–2	3rd	
1931	Lehigh	3–7	0–2	3rd	
1932	Lehigh	2–6–1	0–2	3rd	
1933	Lehigh	2–6	0–2	3rd	
Lehigh:		18–33–3	1–9		
Bloomsburg Huskies (Pennsylvania State Teachers Conference) (1936–1939)
1936	Bloomsburg	1–7	1–6	11th	
1937	Bloomsburg	3–4	2–4	T–7th	
1938	Bloomsburg	1–6–1	0–6–1	13th	
1939	Bloomsburg	0–8	0–7	13th	
Bloomsburg:		5–25–1	3–23–1		
Total:		23–58–4			
National championship Conference title Conference division title or championship game berth
