= 1928 CCNY Lavender football team =

American college football season

1928 CCNY Lavender football
- Conference: Independent
- Record: 4–1–2
- Head coach: Harold J. Parker (5th season)
- Captain: Willie Halpern
- Home stadium: Lewisohn Stadium

1928 Eastern college football independents records
	Conf.			Overall
Team	W	L	T	W		L		T
Boston College		–		9	–	0	–	0
West Chester		–		8	–	0	–	0
Villanova		–		7	–	0	–	1
Brown		–		8	–	1	–	0
No. 11 Penn		–		8	–	1	–	0
No. 6 Carnegie Tech		–		7	–	1	–	0
No. 9 Army		–		8	–	2	–	0
Drexel		–		8	–	2	–	0
No. 10 NYU		–		8	–	2	–	0
Temple		–		7	–	1	–	2
Lafayette		–		6	–	1	–	2
Princeton		–		5	–	1	–	2
CCNY		–		4	–	1	–	2
Pittsburgh		–		6	–	2	–	1
Harvard		–		5	–	2	–	1
Tufts		–		5	–	2	–	1
Colgate		–		6	–	3	–	0
Rutgers		–		6	–	3	–	0
Bucknell		–		5	–	2	–	3
Columbia		–		5	–	3	–	1
Boston University		–		3	–	3	–	2
Cornell		–		3	–	3	–	2
Syracuse		–		4	–	4	–	1
Yale		–		4	–	4	–	0
Fordham		–		4	–	5	–	0
Franklin & Marshall		–		4	–	5	–	0
Penn State		–		3	–	5	–	1
Lehigh		–		3	–	6	–	0
Washington & Jefferson		–		2	–	5	–	2
Providence		–		1	–	5	–	3
Vermont		–		1	–	7	–	2
Rankings from Dickinson System

The 1928 CCNY Lavender football team was an American football team that represented the City College of New York (CCNY) as an independent during the 1928 college football season. In their fifth season under Harold J. Parker, the Lavender team compiled a 4–1–2 record.

== Schedule ==
Date	Opponent	Site	Result	Attendance	Source
October 6	at Lebanon Valley	Annville, PA	T 6–6		
October 13	St. Lawrence	Lewisohn Stadium; New York, NY	W 38–0		
October 20	Drexel	Lewisohn Stadium; New York, NY	W 26–6	5,000	
October 27	at George Washington	Central High School Stadium; Washington, DC	W 33–0	5,000	
November 3	at RPI	'86 Field; Troy, NY	T 0–0		
November 10	Norwich	Lewisohn Stadium; New York, NY	W 19–0		
November 17	Manhattan	Lewisohn Stadium; New York, NY	L 10–14	10,000	
