= 1928 Syracuse Orangemen football team =

American college football season

1928 Syracuse Orangemen football
- Conference: Independent
- Record: 4–4–1
- Head coach: Lew Andreas (2nd season)
- Captain: Harold Baysinger
- Home stadium: Archbold Stadium

1928 Eastern college football independents records
	Conf.			Overall
Team	W	L	T	W		L		T
Boston College		–		9	–	0	–	0
West Chester		–		8	–	0	–	0
Villanova		–		7	–	0	–	1
Brown		–		8	–	1	–	0
No. 11 Penn		–		8	–	1	–	0
No. 6 Carnegie Tech		–		7	–	1	–	0
No. 9 Army		–		8	–	2	–	0
Drexel		–		8	–	2	–	0
No. 10 NYU		–		8	–	2	–	0
Temple		–		7	–	1	–	2
Lafayette		–		6	–	1	–	2
Princeton		–		5	–	1	–	2
CCNY		–		4	–	1	–	2
Pittsburgh		–		6	–	2	–	1
Harvard		–		5	–	2	–	1
Tufts		–		5	–	2	–	1
Colgate		–		6	–	3	–	0
Rutgers		–		6	–	3	–	0
Bucknell		–		5	–	2	–	3
Columbia		–		5	–	3	–	1
Boston University		–		3	–	3	–	2
Cornell		–		3	–	3	–	2
Syracuse		–		4	–	4	–	1
Yale		–		4	–	4	–	0
Fordham		–		4	–	5	–	0
Franklin & Marshall		–		4	–	5	–	0
Penn State		–		3	–	5	–	1
Lehigh		–		3	–	6	–	0
Washington & Jefferson		–		2	–	5	–	2
Providence		–		1	–	5	–	3
Vermont		–		1	–	7	–	2
Rankings from Dickinson System

The 1928 Syracuse Orangemen football team represented Syracuse University as an independent during the 1928 college football season. The Orangemen were led by second-year head coach Lew Andreas and played their home games at Archbold Stadium in Syracuse, New York.

== Schedule ==
Date	Opponent	Site	Result	Attendance
September 29	Hobart	Archbold Stadium; Syracuse, NY	W 14–6	10,000
October 6	William & Mary	Archbold Stadium; Syracuse, NY	W 32–0	
October 13	Johns Hopkins	Archbold Stadium; Syracuse, NY	W 58–0	
October 20	at Nebraska	Memorial Stadium; Lincoln, NE	L 6–7	23,000–30,000
October 27	at Penn State	New Beaver Field; State College, PA (rivalry)	T 6–6	12,000–15,000
November 3	at Pittsburgh	Pitt Stadium; Pittsburgh, PA (rivalry)	L 0-6	12,000
November 10	Ohio Wesleyan	Archbold Stadium; Syracuse, NY	L 0–6	15,000
November 17	Colgate	Archbold Stadium; Syracuse, NY (rivalry)	L 0–21	35,000
November 29	at Columbia	Baker Field; New York, NY	W 13–6	35,000
