= 1928 Villanova Wildcats football team =

American college football season

1928 Villanova Wildcats football
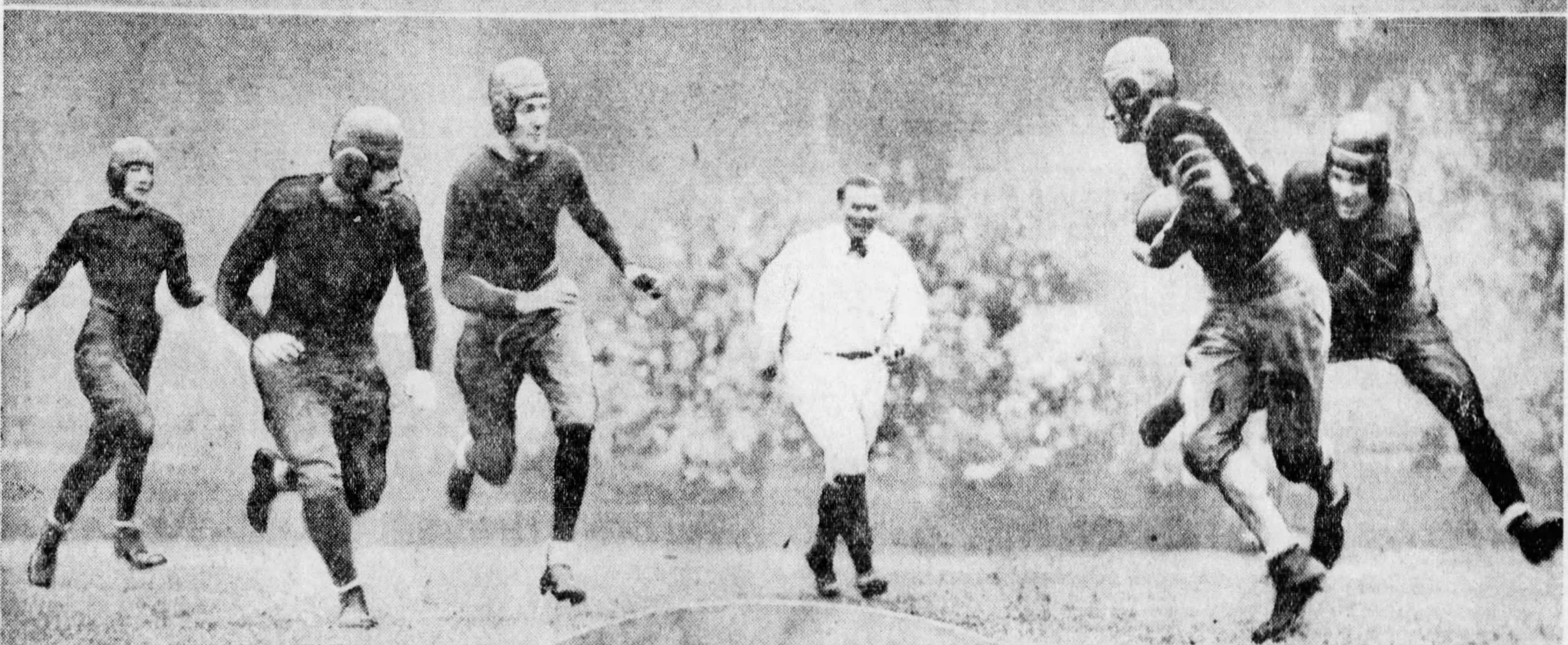
- Temple Owls' Hansen attacking Villanova Wildcats in the third period of the November 10, 1928 football game at Franklin Field
- Conference: Independent
- Record: 7–0–1
- Head coach: Harry Stuhldreher (4th season)
- Captain: Louis Pessalano
- Home stadium: Villanova Stadium

1928 Eastern college football independents records
	Conf.			Overall
Team	W	L	T	W		L		T
Boston College		–		9	–	0	–	0
West Chester		–		8	–	0	–	0
Villanova		–		7	–	0	–	1
Brown		–		8	–	1	–	0
No. 11 Penn		–		8	–	1	–	0
No. 6 Carnegie Tech		–		7	–	1	–	0
No. 9 Army		–		8	–	2	–	0
Drexel		–		8	–	2	–	0
No. 10 NYU		–		8	–	2	–	0
Temple		–		7	–	1	–	2
Lafayette		–		6	–	1	–	2
Princeton		–		5	–	1	–	2
CCNY		–		4	–	1	–	2
Pittsburgh		–		6	–	2	–	1
Harvard		–		5	–	2	–	1
Tufts		–		5	–	2	–	1
Colgate		–		6	–	3	–	0
Rutgers		–		6	–	3	–	0
Bucknell		–		5	–	2	–	3
Columbia		–		5	–	3	–	1
Boston University		–		3	–	3	–	2
Cornell		–		3	–	3	–	2
Syracuse		–		4	–	4	–	1
Yale		–		4	–	4	–	0
Fordham		–		4	–	5	–	0
Franklin & Marshall		–		4	–	5	–	0
Penn State		–		3	–	5	–	1
Lehigh		–		3	–	6	–	0
Washington & Jefferson		–		2	–	5	–	2
Providence		–		1	–	5	–	3
Vermont		–		1	–	7	–	2
Rankings from Dickinson System

The 1928 Villanova Wildcats football team represented the Villanova University during the 1928 college football season. The head coach was Harry Stuhldreher, coaching his fourth season with the Wildcats. The team played their home games at Villanova Stadium in Villanova, Pennsylvania.

== Schedule ==
Date	Opponent	Site	Result	Attendance	Source
October 6	Loyola (MD)	Philadelphia, PA	W 34–0		
October 13	at Catholic University	Brookland Stadium; Washington, DC	W 19–0		
October 20	Gettysburg	Villanova Stadium; Villanova, PA	W 7–2		
October 27	Lebanon Valley	Villanova Stadium; Villanova, PA	W 19–0		
November 3	vs. Bucknell	Brooks Athletic Field; Scranton, PA	W 20–6	10,000	
November 10	Temple	Franklin Field; Philadelphia, PA	T 0–0		
November 17	Grove City	Villanova Stadium; Villanova, PA	W 14–13		
November 24	Davis & Elkins	Villanova Stadium; Villanova, PA	W 20–13		
