= 1928 Temple Owls football team =

American college football season

1928 Temple Owls football
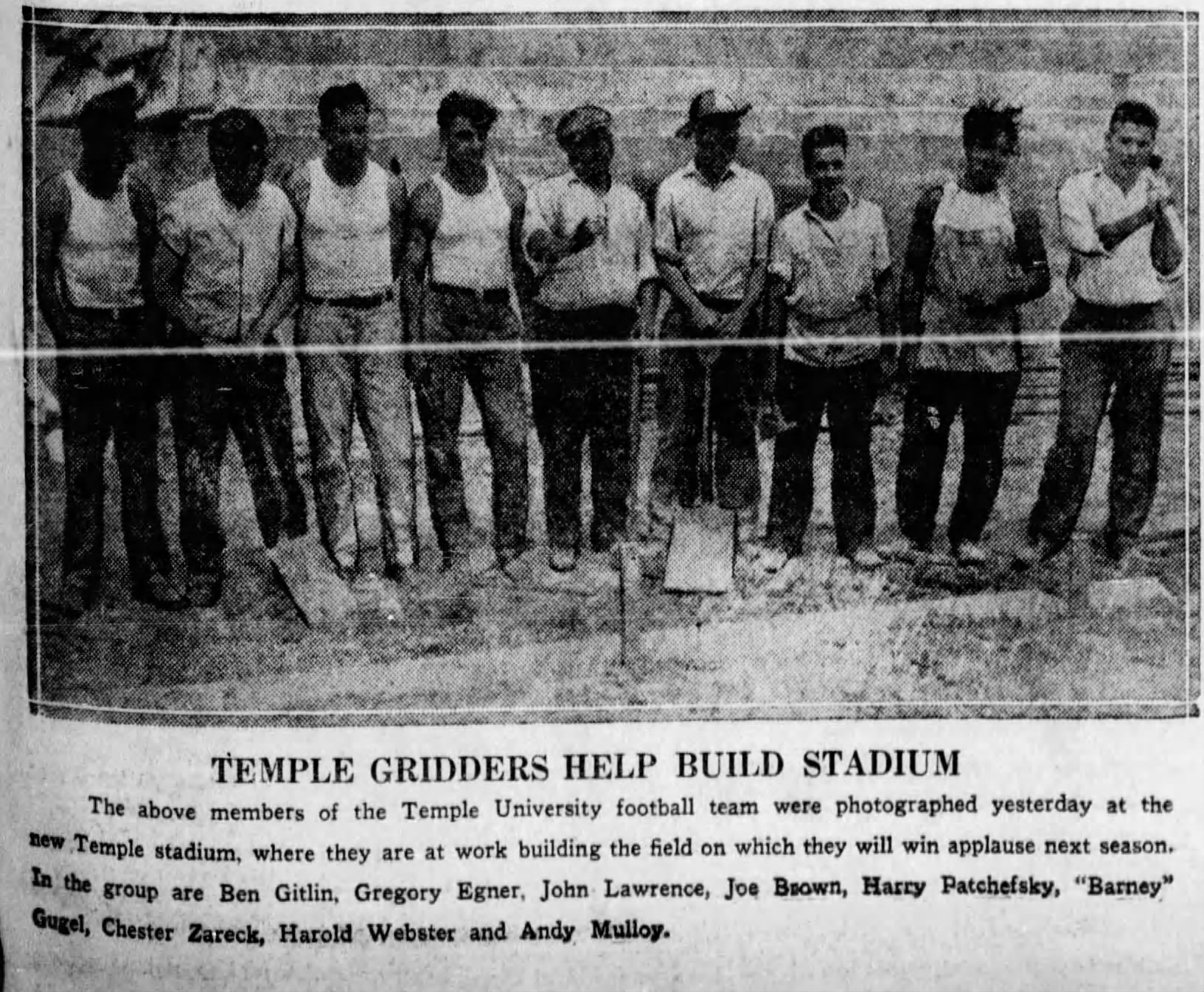
- Conference: Independent
- Record: 7–1–2
- Head coach: Heinie Miller (4th season)
- Captain: Howard "Barney" Gugel
- Home stadium: Temple Stadium

1928 Eastern college football independents records
	Conf.			Overall
Team	W	L	T	W		L		T
Boston College		–		9	–	0	–	0
West Chester		–		8	–	0	–	0
Villanova		–		7	–	0	–	1
Brown		–		8	–	1	–	0
No. 11 Penn		–		8	–	1	–	0
No. 6 Carnegie Tech		–		7	–	1	–	0
No. 9 Army		–		8	–	2	–	0
Drexel		–		8	–	2	–	0
No. 10 NYU		–		8	–	2	–	0
Temple		–		7	–	1	–	2
Lafayette		–		6	–	1	–	2
Princeton		–		5	–	1	–	2
CCNY		–		4	–	1	–	2
Pittsburgh		–		6	–	2	–	1
Harvard		–		5	–	2	–	1
Tufts		–		5	–	2	–	1
Colgate		–		6	–	3	–	0
Rutgers		–		6	–	3	–	0
Bucknell		–		5	–	2	–	3
Columbia		–		5	–	3	–	1
Boston University		–		3	–	3	–	2
Cornell		–		3	–	3	–	2
Syracuse		–		4	–	4	–	1
Yale		–		4	–	4	–	0
Fordham		–		4	–	5	–	0
Franklin & Marshall		–		4	–	5	–	0
Penn State		–		3	–	5	–	1
Lehigh		–		3	–	6	–	0
Washington & Jefferson		–		2	–	5	–	2
Providence		–		1	–	5	–	3
Vermont		–		1	–	7	–	2
Rankings from Dickinson System

The 1928 Temple Owls football team was an American football team that represented Temple University as an independent during the 1928 college football season. In its fourth season under head coach Heinie Miller, the team compiled a 7–1–2 record. Quarterback Howard "Barney" Gugel was the team captain.

The team played its home games at the newly built Temple Stadium in Philadelphia. The Owls played their first game in the new stadium on September 29, 1929 – a 12–0 victory over St. Thomas (PA). The dedication of the stadium occurred two weeks later on October 13.

== Schedule ==
Date	Opponent	Site	Result	Attendance	Source
September 29	St. Thomas (PA)	Temple Stadium; Philadelphia, PA	W 12–0	10,000	
October 6	Gallaudet	Temple Stadium; Philadelphia, PA	W 39–0	20,000	
October 13	Western Maryland	Temple Stadium; Philadelphia, PA	W 7–0	25,000	
October 20	Albright	Temple Stadium; Philadelphia, PA	W 32–0	8,000	
October 27	Providence College	Temple Stadium; Philadelphia, PA	W 41–0		
November 3	at Schuylkill (Note: In 1928, Schuylkill College of Reading, Pennsylvania, merged with Albright College, also located in Reading.)	Schuylkill Stadium; Reading, PA	L 7–10		
November 10	Villanova	Franklin Field; Philadelphia, PA	T 0–0	35,000	
November 17	Geneva	Temple Stadium; Philadelphia, PA	W 6–0	15,000	
November 24	Washington College	Temple Stadium; Philadelphia, PA	W 73–6	10,000	
November 29	at Bucknell	Memorial Stadium; Lewisburg, PA	T 7–7	8,000	
