= 1928 West Chester Golden Rams football team =

American college football season

1928 West Chester Golden Rams football
- Conference: Independent
- Record: 8–0
- Head coach: James McGovern (5th season)
- Captain: Ned Hopkins
- Home stadium: Wayne Field

1928 Eastern college football independents records
	Conf.			Overall
Team	W	L	T	W		L		T
Boston College		–		9	–	0	–	0
West Chester		–		8	–	0	–	0
Villanova		–		7	–	0	–	1
Brown		–		8	–	1	–	0
No. 11 Penn		–		8	–	1	–	0
No. 6 Carnegie Tech		–		7	–	1	–	0
No. 9 Army		–		8	–	2	–	0
Drexel		–		8	–	2	–	0
No. 10 NYU		–		8	–	2	–	0
Temple		–		7	–	1	–	2
Lafayette		–		6	–	1	–	2
Princeton		–		5	–	1	–	2
CCNY		–		4	–	1	–	2
Pittsburgh		–		6	–	2	–	1
Harvard		–		5	–	2	–	1
Tufts		–		5	–	2	–	1
Colgate		–		6	–	3	–	0
Rutgers		–		6	–	3	–	0
Bucknell		–		5	–	2	–	3
Columbia		–		5	–	3	–	1
Boston University		–		3	–	3	–	2
Cornell		–		3	–	3	–	2
Syracuse		–		4	–	4	–	1
Yale		–		4	–	4	–	0
Fordham		–		4	–	5	–	0
Franklin & Marshall		–		4	–	5	–	0
Penn State		–		3	–	5	–	1
Lehigh		–		3	–	6	–	0
Washington & Jefferson		–		2	–	5	–	2
Providence		–		1	–	5	–	3
Vermont		–		1	–	7	–	2
Rankings from Dickinson System

The 1928 West Chester Golden Rams football team was an American football team that represented West Chester State College (now known as West Chester University) as an independent during the 1928 college football season. In their fifth and final year under head coach James McGovern, the Golden Rams compiled a perfect 8–0 record and outscored opponents by a total of 104 to 27.

The 1928 season was one of five perfect seasons in West Chester Rams football history, the others being 1923, 1952, 1957, and 1960.

The team played its home game at Wayne Field in West Chester, Pennsylvania.

== Schedule ==
Date	Opponent	Site	Result	Attendance	Source
September 29	Elizabethtown	Wayne Field; West Chester, PA	W 18–0		
October 6	at The Hill School	Pottstown, PA	W 12–7		
October 13	at Bloomsburg	Bloomsburg, PA	W 13–0		
October 20	Lafayette freshmen	Wayne Field; West Chester, PA	W 12–7		
October 27	Villanova freshman	Wayne Field; West Chester, PA	W 7–6		
November 3	Beckley College	Wayne Field; West Chester, PA	W 24–7		
November 10	at Millersville	Millersville, PA	W 6–0		
November 17	East Stroudsburg	Wayne Field; West Chester, PA	W 12–0		
