= 1928 Cornell Big Red football team =

American college football season

1928 Cornell Big Red football
- Conference: Independent
- Record: 3–3–2
- Head coach: Gil Dobie (9th season)
- Offensive scheme: Single-wing
- Base defense: 6–3–2
- Captain: Dudley Schoales
- Home stadium: Schoellkopf Field

1928 Eastern college football independents records
| | Conf. | | | Overall |
| Team | W | L | T | W | | L | | T |
|---|---|---|---|---|---|---|---|---|
| Boston College | | – | | 9 | – | 0 | – | 0 |
| West Chester | | – | | 8 | – | 0 | – | 0 |
| Villanova | | – | | 7 | – | 0 | – | 1 |
| Brown | | – | | 8 | – | 1 | – | 0 |
| No. 11 Penn | | – | | 8 | – | 1 | – | 0 |
| No. 6 Carnegie Tech | | – | | 7 | – | 1 | – | 0 |
| No. 9 Army | | – | | 8 | – | 2 | – | 0 |
| Drexel | | – | | 8 | – | 2 | – | 0 |
| No. 10 NYU | | – | | 8 | – | 2 | – | 0 |
| Temple | | – | | 7 | – | 1 | – | 2 |
| Lafayette | | – | | 6 | – | 1 | – | 2 |
| Princeton | | – | | 5 | – | 1 | – | 2 |
| CCNY | | – | | 4 | – | 1 | – | 2 |
| Pittsburgh | | – | | 6 | – | 2 | – | 1 |
| Harvard | | – | | 5 | – | 2 | – | 1 |
| Tufts | | – | | 5 | – | 2 | – | 1 |
| Colgate | | – | | 6 | – | 3 | – | 0 |
| Rutgers | | – | | 6 | – | 3 | – | 0 |
| Bucknell | | – | | 5 | – | 2 | – | 3 |
| Columbia | | – | | 5 | – | 3 | – | 1 |
| Boston University | | – | | 3 | – | 3 | – | 2 |
| Cornell | | – | | 3 | – | 3 | – | 2 |
| Syracuse | | – | | 4 | – | 4 | – | 1 |
| Yale | | – | | 4 | – | 4 | – | 0 |
| Fordham | | – | | 4 | – | 5 | – | 0 |
| Franklin & Marshall | | – | | 4 | – | 5 | – | 0 |
| Penn State | | – | | 3 | – | 5 | – | 1 |
| Lehigh | | – | | 3 | – | 6 | – | 0 |
| Washington & Jefferson | | – | | 2 | – | 5 | – | 2 |
| Providence | | – | | 1 | – | 5 | – | 3 |
| Vermont | | – | | 1 | – | 7 | – | 2 |
Rankings from Dickinson System

The 1928 Cornell Big Red football team was an American football team that represented Cornell University during the 1928 college football season. In their eighth season under head coach Gil Dobie, the Big Red compiled a 3–3–2 record and were outscored by their opponents by a combined total of 86 to 72.=

== Schedule ==
| Date | Opponent | Site | Result | Attendance | Source |
|---|---|---|---|---|---|
| October 6 | Clarkson | Schoellkopf Field; Ithaca, NY | W 20–0 | | |
| October 13 | Niagara | Schoellkopf Field; Ithaca, NY | W 34–0 | | |
| October 20 | Hampden–Sydney | Schoellkopf Field; Ithaca, NY | W 18–6 | | |
| October 27 | at Princeton | Palmer Stadium; Princeton, NJ | L 0–3 | | |
| November 3 | at Columbia | Baker Field; New York, NY (rivalry) | T 0–0 | 22,000 | |
| November 10 | St. Bonaventure | Schoellkopf Field; Ithaca, NY | T 0–0 | | |
| November 17 | Dartmouth | Schoellkopf Field; Ithaca, NY (rivalry) | L 0–28 | | |
| November 29 | at Penn | Franklin Field; Philadelphia, PA (rivalry) | L 0–49 | | |
