= 1928 Bucknell Bison football team =

American college football season

1928 Bucknell Bison football
- Conference: Independent
- Record: 5–2–3
- Head coach: Carl Snavely (2nd season)
- Home stadium: Memorial Stadium

1928 Eastern college football independents records
	Conf.			Overall
Team	W	L	T	W		L		T
Boston College		–		9	–	0	–	0
West Chester		–		8	–	0	–	0
Villanova		–		7	–	0	–	1
Brown		–		8	–	1	–	0
No. 11 Penn		–		8	–	1	–	0
No. 6 Carnegie Tech		–		7	–	1	–	0
No. 9 Army		–		8	–	2	–	0
Drexel		–		8	–	2	–	0
No. 10 NYU		–		8	–	2	–	0
Temple		–		7	–	1	–	2
Lafayette		–		6	–	1	–	2
Princeton		–		5	–	1	–	2
CCNY		–		4	–	1	–	2
Pittsburgh		–		6	–	2	–	1
Harvard		–		5	–	2	–	1
Tufts		–		5	–	2	–	1
Colgate		–		6	–	3	–	0
Rutgers		–		6	–	3	–	0
Bucknell		–		5	–	2	–	3
Columbia		–		5	–	3	–	1
Boston University		–		3	–	3	–	2
Cornell		–		3	–	3	–	2
Syracuse		–		4	–	4	–	1
Yale		–		4	–	4	–	0
Fordham		–		4	–	5	–	0
Franklin & Marshall		–		4	–	5	–	0
Penn State		–		3	–	5	–	1
Lehigh		–		3	–	6	–	0
Washington & Jefferson		–		2	–	5	–	2
Providence		–		1	–	5	–	3
Vermont		–		1	–	7	–	2
Rankings from Dickinson System

The 1928 Bucknell Bison football team was an American football team that represented Bucknell University as an independent during the 1928 college football season. In its second season under head coach Carl Snavely, the team compiled a 5–2–3 record.

The team played its home games at Memorial Stadium in Lewisburg, Pennsylvania.

== Schedule ==
Date	Opponent	Site	Result	Attendance	Source
September 29	Schuylkill	Memorial Stadium; Lewisburg, PA	W 7–0		
October 6	at Geneva	Beaver Falls, PA	W 13–7		
October 13	at Penn State	New Beaver Field; State College, PA	W 6–0	> 10,000	
October 20	Lafayette^{†}	Lewisburg, PA	T 0–0	16,000	
November 3	vs. Villanova	Brooks Athletic Field; Scranton, PA	L 6–20	10,000	
November 10	Lehigh	Lewisburg, PA	W 40–0		
November 17	at Washington & Jefferson	Washington, PA	T 0–0		
November 24	at Dickinson	Carlisle, PA	W 33–0		
November 29	at Temple	Memorial Stadium; Lewisburg, PA	T 7–7	8,000	
^{†}Homecoming
