= 1928 Boston University Pioneers football team =

American college football season

1928 Boston University Pioneers football
- Conference: Independent
- Record: 3–3–2
- Head coach: Reggie Brown & Edward N. Robinson (3rd season)
- Captain: Arthur Dorfman
- Home stadium: Nickerson Field

1928 Eastern college football independents records
	Conf.			Overall
Team	W	L	T	W		L		T
Boston College		–		9	–	0	–	0
West Chester		–		8	–	0	–	0
Villanova		–		7	–	0	–	1
Brown		–		8	–	1	–	0
No. 11 Penn		–		8	–	1	–	0
No. 6 Carnegie Tech		–		7	–	1	–	0
No. 9 Army		–		8	–	2	–	0
Drexel		–		8	–	2	–	0
No. 10 NYU		–		8	–	2	–	0
Temple		–		7	–	1	–	2
Lafayette		–		6	–	1	–	2
Princeton		–		5	–	1	–	2
CCNY		–		4	–	1	–	2
Pittsburgh		–		6	–	2	–	1
Harvard		–		5	–	2	–	1
Tufts		–		5	–	2	–	1
Colgate		–		6	–	3	–	0
Rutgers		–		6	–	3	–	0
Bucknell		–		5	–	2	–	3
Columbia		–		5	–	3	–	1
Boston University		–		3	–	3	–	2
Cornell		–		3	–	3	–	2
Syracuse		–		4	–	4	–	1
Yale		–		4	–	4	–	0
Fordham		–		4	–	5	–	0
Franklin & Marshall		–		4	–	5	–	0
Penn State		–		3	–	5	–	1
Lehigh		–		3	–	6	–	0
Washington & Jefferson		–		2	–	5	–	2
Providence		–		1	–	5	–	3
Vermont		–		1	–	7	–	2
Rankings from Dickinson System

The 1928 Boston University Pioneers football team was an American football team that represented Boston University as an independent during the 1928 college football season. In its third season under head coaches Reggie Brown and Edward N. Robinson, the team compiled a 3–3–2 record and was outscored by a total of 95 to 58.

== Schedule ==
Date	Time	Opponent	Site	Result	Attendance	Source
September 29		at Army	Michie Stadium; West Point, NY	L 0–35		
October 6	3:00 p.m.	New Hampshire	Nickerson Field; Weston, MA	T 0–0		
October 13		at Vermont	Centennial Field; Burlington, VT	W 25–0		
October 20	2:30 p.m.	Bates	Nickerson Field; Weston, MA	W 7–0		
October 27	2:00 p.m.	at Boston College	Fenway Park; Boston, MA (rivalry)	L 7–27		
November 3	2:00 p.m.	Springfield	Nickerson Field; Weston, MA	W 7–6		
November 10		at Holy Cross	Fitton Field; Worcester, MA	L 0–15		
November 17	2:00 p.m.	Norwich	Nickerson Field; Weston, MA	T 12–12		
All times are in Eastern time
