= 1928 Harvard Crimson football team =

American college football season

1928 Harvard Crimson football
- Conference: Independent
- Record: 5–2–1
- Head coach: Arnold Horween (3rd season)
- Captain: Arthur E. French
- Home stadium: Harvard Stadium

1928 Eastern college football independents records
	Conf.			Overall
Team	W	L	T	W		L		T
Boston College		–		9	–	0	–	0
West Chester		–		8	–	0	–	0
Villanova		–		7	–	0	–	1
Brown		–		8	–	1	–	0
No. 11 Penn		–		8	–	1	–	0
No. 6 Carnegie Tech		–		7	–	1	–	0
No. 9 Army		–		8	–	2	–	0
Drexel		–		8	–	2	–	0
No. 10 NYU		–		8	–	2	–	0
Temple		–		7	–	1	–	2
Lafayette		–		6	–	1	–	2
Princeton		–		5	–	1	–	2
CCNY		–		4	–	1	–	2
Pittsburgh		–		6	–	2	–	1
Harvard		–		5	–	2	–	1
Tufts		–		5	–	2	–	1
Colgate		–		6	–	3	–	0
Rutgers		–		6	–	3	–	0
Bucknell		–		5	–	2	–	3
Columbia		–		5	–	3	–	1
Boston University		–		3	–	3	–	2
Cornell		–		3	–	3	–	2
Syracuse		–		4	–	4	–	1
Yale		–		4	–	4	–	0
Fordham		–		4	–	5	–	0
Franklin & Marshall		–		4	–	5	–	0
Penn State		–		3	–	5	–	1
Lehigh		–		3	–	6	–	0
Washington & Jefferson		–		2	–	5	–	2
Providence		–		1	–	5	–	3
Vermont		–		1	–	7	–	2
Rankings from Dickinson System

The 1928 Harvard Crimson football team represented Harvard University as an independent during the 1928 college football season. In its third season under head coach Arnold Horween, Harvard compiled a 5–2–1 record and outscored opponents by a total of 125 to 29. Arthur E. French was the team captain. The team played its home games at Harvard Stadium in Boston.

== Schedule ==
Date	Opponent	Site	Result	Attendance	Source
October 6	Springfield	Harvard Stadium; Boston, MA	W 30–0		
October 13	North Carolina	Harvard Stadium; Boston, MA	W 20–0		
October 20	Army	Harvard Stadium; Boston, MA	L 0–15		
October 27	Dartmouth	Harvard Stadium; Boston, MA (rivalry)	W 19–7	53,000	
November 3	Lehigh	Harvard Stadium; Boston, MA	W 39–0		
November 10	Penn	Harvard Stadium; Boston, MA (rivalry)	L 0–7		
November 17	Holy Cross	Harvard Stadium; Boston, MA	T 0–0		
November 24	at Yale	Yale Bowl; New Haven, CT (rivalry)	W 17–0		
