= 1928 Fordham Maroon football team =

American college football season

1928 Fordham Maroon football
- Conference: Independent
- Record: 4–5
- Head coach: Frank Cavanaugh (2nd season)
- Captain: John Smith
- Home stadium: Fordham Field, Yankee Stadium, Polo Grounds

1928 Eastern college football independents records
	Conf.			Overall
Team	W	L	T	W		L		T
Boston College		–		9	–	0	–	0
West Chester		–		8	–	0	–	0
Villanova		–		7	–	0	–	1
Brown		–		8	–	1	–	0
No. 11 Penn		–		8	–	1	–	0
No. 6 Carnegie Tech		–		7	–	1	–	0
No. 9 Army		–		8	–	2	–	0
Drexel		–		8	–	2	–	0
No. 10 NYU		–		8	–	2	–	0
Temple		–		7	–	1	–	2
Lafayette		–		6	–	1	–	2
Princeton		–		5	–	1	–	2
CCNY		–		4	–	1	–	2
Pittsburgh		–		6	–	2	–	1
Harvard		–		5	–	2	–	1
Tufts		–		5	–	2	–	1
Colgate		–		6	–	3	–	0
Rutgers		–		6	–	3	–	0
Bucknell		–		5	–	2	–	3
Columbia		–		5	–	3	–	1
Boston University		–		3	–	3	–	2
Cornell		–		3	–	3	–	2
Syracuse		–		4	–	4	–	1
Yale		–		4	–	4	–	0
Fordham		–		4	–	5	–	0
Franklin & Marshall		–		4	–	5	–	0
Penn State		–		3	–	5	–	1
Lehigh		–		3	–	6	–	0
Washington & Jefferson		–		2	–	5	–	2
Providence		–		1	–	5	–	3
Vermont		–		1	–	7	–	2
Rankings from Dickinson System

The 1928 Fordham Maroon football team was an American football team that represented Fordham University as an independent during the 1928 college football season. In its second year under head coach Frank Cavanaugh, Fordham compiled a 4–5 record and outscored opponents by a total of 130 to 121. Dave Morey was hired as an assistant coach for the season. John Smith was the team captain.

== Schedule ==
Date	Time	Opponent	Site	Result	Attendance	Source
September 28		St. Bonaventure	St. Bonaventure, NY	W 27–0		
October 6		George Washington	Fordham Field; Bronx, NY	W 20–0		
October 13		NYU	Polo Grounds; New York, NY	L 7–34	50,000	
October 20		at Holy Cross	Fitton Field; Worcester, MA	W 19–13		
October 27		Washington & Jefferson	Polo Grounds; New York, NY	W 34–0		
November 6		West Virginia	Yankee Stadium; Bronx, NY	L 0–18	25,000	
November 12	2:00 p.m.	at Boston College	Fenway Park; Boston, MA	L 7–19	35,000	
November 17		Detroit	Polo Grounds; New York, NY	L 0–19	5,000	
November 24		Georgetown	Polo Grounds; New York, NY	L 7–27		
