= Willie Halpern =

American football player (1906–1999)

- Willie Halpern, 1929

Profile
- Position: Tackle

Personal information
- Born: November 6, 1906; New York, New York
- Died: November 5, 1999 (aged 92); Hollywood, Florida
- Listed height: 5 ft 11 in (1.80 m)
- Listed weight: 220 lb (100 kg)

Career information
- High school: New Utrecht (NY)
- College: CCNY

Career history
- Brooklyn Blue Devils (1929); Staten Island Stapletons (1930)

William Halpern (November 5, 1906 – November 5, 1999) was an American football tackle.

Halpern was born in 1906 in New York City. He attended New Utrecht High School in Brooklyn. He attended the City College of New York (CCNY) where played at the tackle position and placekicker for the football team. He played in every game in 1926 and was selected as the captain of the 1928 CCNY Lavender football team. He was rated as one of the best football players in the school history. Halpern was also the star of the C.C.N.Y. water polo and lacrosse teams. In June 1929, he was chosen as the best all-around athlete in C.C.N.Y.'s senior class.

In 1929, he played professional football for the Brooklyn Blue Devils.

In 1930, he played in the National Football League (NFL) as a tackle for the Staten Island Stapletons. He appeared in three NFL games, two as a starter.

He died in Hollywood, Florida, in 1999 at age 92.
