= James F. McGovern (coach) =

American football and basketball player and coach (1893–1976)

Biographical details
- Born: September 13, 1893; Elmira, New York, U.S.
- Died: April 8, 1976 (aged 82); Gulf Breeze, Florida, U.S.

Playing career

Football
- 1915–1918: Muhlenberg

Coaching career (HC unless noted)

Football
- 1924–1928: West Chester
- 1935–1942: Kutztown

Basketball
- 1924–1929: West Chester
- 1935–1944: Kutztown

Head coaching record
- Overall: 54–36–4 (football)

James Francis McGovern, also known as Francis James McGovern, (September 13, 1893 – April 8, 1976) was an American college football and college basketball coach. He served as the head football coach at West Chester State Teachers College, now known as West Chester University, from 1924 to 1928 and Kutztown State Teacher's College, now known as Kutztown University of Pennsylvania, from 1935 to 1942, compiling a career college football coaching record of 54–36–4.

McGovern died on April 8, 1976, in Gulf Breeze, Florida.

== Head coaching record ==
=== Football ===
Year	Team	Overall	Conference	Standing	Bowl/playoffs
West Chester Golden Rams (Independent) (1924–1928)
1924	West Chester	5–2			
1925	West Chester	5–2			
1926	West Chester	4–3			
1927	West Chester	7–1			
1928	West Chester	8–0			
West Chester:		29–8			
Kutztown Golden Avalanche (Pennsylvania State Teachers Conference / Pennsylvania State Teachers College Conference) (1935–1943)
1935	Kutztown	3–5	0–3	12th	
1936	Kutztown	5–2–1	1–1–1	T–6th	
1937	Kutztown	4–2–1	1–2	T–7th	
1938	Kutztown	4–1–2	2–1–2	6th	
1939	Kutztown	5–3	2–3	9th	
1940	Kutztown	3–5	2–2	T–6th	
1941	Kutztown	0–6	0–5	13th	
1942	Kutztown	1–4	0–4	10th	
Kutztown:		25–28–4	8–21–3		
Total:		54–36–4			
