= 1928 Lafayette Leopards football team =

American football club

1928 Lafayette Leopards football
- Conference: Independent
- Record: 6–1–2
- Head coach: Herb McCracken (5th season)
- Captain: Richard Guest
- Home stadium: Fisher Field

1928 Eastern college football independents records
| | Conf. | | | Overall |
| Team | W | L | T | W | | L | | T |
|---|---|---|---|---|---|---|---|---|
| Boston College | | – | | 9 | – | 0 | – | 0 |
| West Chester | | – | | 8 | – | 0 | – | 0 |
| Villanova | | – | | 7 | – | 0 | – | 1 |
| Brown | | – | | 8 | – | 1 | – | 0 |
| No. 11 Penn | | – | | 8 | – | 1 | – | 0 |
| No. 6 Carnegie Tech | | – | | 7 | – | 1 | – | 0 |
| No. 9 Army | | – | | 8 | – | 2 | – | 0 |
| Drexel | | – | | 8 | – | 2 | – | 0 |
| No. 10 NYU | | – | | 8 | – | 2 | – | 0 |
| Temple | | – | | 7 | – | 1 | – | 2 |
| Lafayette | | – | | 6 | – | 1 | – | 2 |
| Princeton | | – | | 5 | – | 1 | – | 2 |
| CCNY | | – | | 4 | – | 1 | – | 2 |
| Pittsburgh | | – | | 6 | – | 2 | – | 1 |
| Harvard | | – | | 5 | – | 2 | – | 1 |
| Tufts | | – | | 5 | – | 2 | – | 1 |
| Colgate | | – | | 6 | – | 3 | – | 0 |
| Rutgers | | – | | 6 | – | 3 | – | 0 |
| Bucknell | | – | | 5 | – | 2 | – | 3 |
| Columbia | | – | | 5 | – | 3 | – | 1 |
| Boston University | | – | | 3 | – | 3 | – | 2 |
| Cornell | | – | | 3 | – | 3 | – | 2 |
| Syracuse | | – | | 4 | – | 4 | – | 1 |
| Yale | | – | | 4 | – | 4 | – | 0 |
| Fordham | | – | | 4 | – | 5 | – | 0 |
| Franklin & Marshall | | – | | 4 | – | 5 | – | 0 |
| Penn State | | – | | 3 | – | 5 | – | 1 |
| Lehigh | | – | | 3 | – | 6 | – | 0 |
| Washington & Jefferson | | – | | 2 | – | 5 | – | 2 |
| Providence | | – | | 1 | – | 5 | – | 3 |
| Vermont | | – | | 1 | – | 7 | – | 2 |
Rankings from Dickinson System

The 1928 Lafayette Leopards football team was an American football team that represented Lafayette College as an independent during the 1928 college football season. In its fifth season under head coach Herb McCracken, the team compiled a 6–1–2 record, shut out six of nine opponents, and outscored all opponents by a total of 237 to 44. Richard Guest was the team captain. The team played its home games at Fisher Field in Easton, Pennsylvania.

== Schedule ==
| Date | Opponent | Site | Result | Attendance | Source |
|---|---|---|---|---|---|
| September 29 | Albright | Fisher Field; Easton, PA | W 78–0 | | |
| October 6 | Muhlenberg | Fisher Field; Easton, PA | W 56–0 | | |
| October 13 | George Washington | Fisher Field; Easton, PA | W 28–0 | | |
| October 20 | at Bucknell | Lewisburg, PA | T 0–0 | 16,000 | |
| October 27 | West Virginia | Fisher Field; Easton, PA | L 0–17 | | |
| November 3 | Washington & Jefferson | Fisher Field; Easton, PA | T 13–13 | | |
| November 10 | at Rutgers | Neilson Field; New Brunswick, NJ | W 17–0 | | |
| November 17 | Penn State | Fisher Field; Easton, PA | W 7–0 | | |
| November 24 | Lehigh | Fisher Field; Easton, PA (rivalry) | W 38–14 | | |
