= 1929 Rutgers Queensmen football team =

American college football season

1929 Rutgers Queensmen football
- Conference: Middle Three Conference
- Record: 5–4 (1–1 Middle Three)
- Head coach: Harry Rockafeller (3rd season)
- Captain: Bernie Crowl
- Home stadium: Neilson Field

1929 Middle Three Conference football standings
	Conf.					Overall
Team	W		L		T	W		L		T
Lehigh +	1	–	1	–	0	4	–	3	–	2
Rutgers +	1	–	1	–	0	5	–	4	–	0
Lafayette +	1	–	1	–	0	3	–	5	–	0
$ – Conference champion

The 1929 Rutgers Queensmen football team represented Rutgers University in the 1929 college football season. In their third season under head coach Harry Rockafeller, the Queensmen compiled a 5–4 record, finished in a three-way tie for the Middle Three Conference championship, and outscored their opponents 109 to 94.

== Schedule ==
Date	Opponent	Site	Result	Attendance	Source
September 28	Providence	Neilson Field; New Brunswick, NJ	W 17–0	8,000	
October 5	Delaware	Neilson Field; New Brunswick, NJ	W 19–0		
October 12	at Holy Cross	Fitton Field; Worcester, MA	L 3–20		
October 19	St. John's (MD)	Neilson Field; New Brunswick, NJ	W 14–7		
October 26	Catholic University	Neilson Field; New Brunswick, NJ	L 10–14		
November 2	Ursinus	Neilson Field; New Brunswick, NJ	W 19–13		
November 9	at Lafayette	Fisher Field; Easton, PA	L 6–20		
November 16	Lehigh	Neilson Field; New Brunswick, NJ	W 14–0	10,000	
November 23	at NYU	Yankee Stadium; Bronx, NY	L 7–20	15,000	
