= 1928 Boston College Eagles football team =

American college football season

1928 Boston College Eagles football
- Conference: Independent
- Record: 9–0
- Head coach: Joe McKenney (1st season)
- Captain: Warren McGuirk
- Home stadium: Fenway Park

1928 Eastern college football independents records
	Conf.			Overall
Team	W	L	T	W		L		T
Boston College		–		9	–	0	–	0
West Chester		–		8	–	0	–	0
Villanova		–		7	–	0	–	1
Brown		–		8	–	1	–	0
No. 11 Penn		–		8	–	1	–	0
No. 6 Carnegie Tech		–		7	–	1	–	0
No. 9 Army		–		8	–	2	–	0
Drexel		–		8	–	2	–	0
No. 10 NYU		–		8	–	2	–	0
Temple		–		7	–	1	–	2
Lafayette		–		6	–	1	–	2
Princeton		–		5	–	1	–	2
CCNY		–		4	–	1	–	2
Pittsburgh		–		6	–	2	–	1
Harvard		–		5	–	2	–	1
Tufts		–		5	–	2	–	1
Colgate		–		6	–	3	–	0
Rutgers		–		6	–	3	–	0
Bucknell		–		5	–	2	–	3
Columbia		–		5	–	3	–	1
Boston University		–		3	–	3	–	2
Cornell		–		3	–	3	–	2
Syracuse		–		4	–	4	–	1
Yale		–		4	–	4	–	0
Fordham		–		4	–	5	–	0
Franklin & Marshall		–		4	–	5	–	0
Penn State		–		3	–	5	–	1
Lehigh		–		3	–	6	–	0
Washington & Jefferson		–		2	–	5	–	2
Providence		–		1	–	5	–	3
Vermont		–		1	–	7	–	2
Rankings from Dickinson System

The 1928 Boston College Eagles football team represented Boston College as an independent during the 1928 college football season. Led by first-year head coach Joe McKenney, Boston College compiled a perfect record of 9–0.

== Schedule ==
Date	Time	Opponent	Site	Result	Attendance	Source
September 29		Catholic University	Fenway Park; Boston, MA	W 38–6		
October 7		at Navy	Thompson Stadium; Annapolis, MD	W 6–0		
October 12		Duke	Fenway Park; Boston, MA	W 19–0	20,000	
October 27	2:00 p.m.	Boston University	Fenway Park; Boston, MA (rivalry)	W 27–7		
November 3		Manhattan	Fenway Park; Boston, MA	W 60–6		
November 12	2:00 p.m.	Fordham	Fenway Park; Boston, MA	W 19–7	35,000	
November 17		at Canisius	Buffalo, NY	W 24–0	10,000	
November 24		Connecticut	Fenway Park; Boston, MA	W 51–13	12,000	
December 1		Holy Cross	Fenway Park; Boston, MA (rivalry)	W 19–0	35,000	
All times are in Eastern time
