= 1928 Lehigh Brown and White football team =

American college football season

1928 Lehigh Brown and White football
- Conference: Independent
- Record: 3–6
- Head coach: A. Austin Tate (1st season)
- Home stadium: Taylor Stadium

1928 Eastern college football independents records
| | Conf. | | | Overall |
| Team | W | L | T | W | | L | | T |
|---|---|---|---|---|---|---|---|---|
| Boston College | | – | | 9 | – | 0 | – | 0 |
| West Chester | | – | | 8 | – | 0 | – | 0 |
| Villanova | | – | | 7 | – | 0 | – | 1 |
| Brown | | – | | 8 | – | 1 | – | 0 |
| No. 11 Penn | | – | | 8 | – | 1 | – | 0 |
| No. 6 Carnegie Tech | | – | | 7 | – | 1 | – | 0 |
| No. 9 Army | | – | | 8 | – | 2 | – | 0 |
| Drexel | | – | | 8 | – | 2 | – | 0 |
| No. 10 NYU | | – | | 8 | – | 2 | – | 0 |
| Temple | | – | | 7 | – | 1 | – | 2 |
| Lafayette | | – | | 6 | – | 1 | – | 2 |
| Princeton | | – | | 5 | – | 1 | – | 2 |
| CCNY | | – | | 4 | – | 1 | – | 2 |
| Pittsburgh | | – | | 6 | – | 2 | – | 1 |
| Harvard | | – | | 5 | – | 2 | – | 1 |
| Tufts | | – | | 5 | – | 2 | – | 1 |
| Colgate | | – | | 6 | – | 3 | – | 0 |
| Rutgers | | – | | 6 | – | 3 | – | 0 |
| Bucknell | | – | | 5 | – | 2 | – | 3 |
| Columbia | | – | | 5 | – | 3 | – | 1 |
| Boston University | | – | | 3 | – | 3 | – | 2 |
| Cornell | | – | | 3 | – | 3 | – | 2 |
| Syracuse | | – | | 4 | – | 4 | – | 1 |
| Yale | | – | | 4 | – | 4 | – | 0 |
| Fordham | | – | | 4 | – | 5 | – | 0 |
| Franklin & Marshall | | – | | 4 | – | 5 | – | 0 |
| Penn State | | – | | 3 | – | 5 | – | 1 |
| Lehigh | | – | | 3 | – | 6 | – | 0 |
| Washington & Jefferson | | – | | 2 | – | 5 | – | 2 |
| Providence | | – | | 1 | – | 5 | – | 3 |
| Vermont | | – | | 1 | – | 7 | – | 2 |
Rankings from Dickinson System

The 1928 Lehigh Brown and White football team was an American football team that represented Lehigh University as an independent during the 1928 college football season. In its first season under head coach A. Austin Tate, the team compiled a 3–6 record and was outscored by a total of 192 to 57.

Tate was hired as Lehigh's head football coach in January 1928. He had played for Lehigh a decade earlier and led the 1927 freshman team to an undefeated season. At the end of the 1928 season, the board of athletic control voted unanimously to renew Tate's contract as head coach.

Lehigh played home games at Taylor Stadium in Bethlehem, Pennsylvania.

== Schedule ==
| Date | Opponent | Site | Result | Source |
|---|---|---|---|---|
| September 29 | St. John's | Taylor Stadium; Bethlehem, PA | W 13–0 | |
| October 6 | Pennsylvania Military | Taylor Stadium; Bethlehem, PA | W 14–7 | |
| October 13 | Gettysburg | Taylor Stadium; Bethlehem, PA | L 0–7 | |
| October 20 | at Princeton | Palmer Stadium; Princeton, NJ | L 0–47 | |
| October 28 | Muhlenberg | Taylor Stadium; Bethlehem, PA | W 13–7 | |
| November 3 | at Harvard | Harvard Stadium; Boston, MA | L 0–39 | |
| November 10 | at Bucknell | Memorial Stadium; Lewisburg, PA | L 0–40 | |
| November 17 | Rutgers | Taylor Stadium; Bethlehem, PA | L 3–7 | |
| November 24 | at Lafayette | Fisher Field; Easton, PA (rivalry) | L 14–38 | |
