= 1928 Brown Bears football team =

American college football season

1928 Brown Bears football
- Conference: Independent
- Record: 8–1
- Head coach: Tuss McLaughry (3rd season)
- Captain: A. C. Cornsweet
- Home stadium: Brown Stadium

1928 Eastern college football independents records
	Conf.			Overall
Team	W	L	T	W		L		T
Boston College		–		9	–	0	–	0
West Chester		–		8	–	0	–	0
Villanova		–		7	–	0	–	1
Brown		–		8	–	1	–	0
No. 11 Penn		–		8	–	1	–	0
No. 6 Carnegie Tech		–		7	–	1	–	0
No. 9 Army		–		8	–	2	–	0
Drexel		–		8	–	2	–	0
No. 10 NYU		–		8	–	2	–	0
Temple		–		7	–	1	–	2
Lafayette		–		6	–	1	–	2
Princeton		–		5	–	1	–	2
CCNY		–		4	–	1	–	2
Pittsburgh		–		6	–	2	–	1
Harvard		–		5	–	2	–	1
Tufts		–		5	–	2	–	1
Colgate		–		6	–	3	–	0
Rutgers		–		6	–	3	–	0
Bucknell		–		5	–	2	–	3
Columbia		–		5	–	3	–	1
Boston University		–		3	–	3	–	2
Cornell		–		3	–	3	–	2
Syracuse		–		4	–	4	–	1
Yale		–		4	–	4	–	0
Fordham		–		4	–	5	–	0
Franklin & Marshall		–		4	–	5	–	0
Penn State		–		3	–	5	–	1
Lehigh		–		3	–	6	–	0
Washington & Jefferson		–		2	–	5	–	2
Providence		–		1	–	5	–	3
Vermont		–		1	–	7	–	2
Rankings from Dickinson System

The 1928 Brown Bears football team represented Brown University as an independent during the 1928 college football season. Led by third-year head coach Tuss McLaughry, the Bears compiled a record of 8–1. Yale gave Brown its only loss on the season.

== Schedule ==
Date	Opponent	Site	Result	Source
October 6	WPI	Brown Stadium; Providence, RI	W 20–0	
October 13	Dayton	Brown Stadium; Providence, RI	W 13–7	
October 20	at Yale	Yale Bowl; New Haven, CT	L 14–32	
October 27	Tufts	Brown Stadium; Providence, RI	W 19–13	
November 3	Holy Cross	Brown Stadium; Providence, RI	W 6–0	
November 10	at Dartmouth	Memorial Field; Hanover, NH	W 14–0	
November 17	New Hampshire	Brown Stadium; Providence, RI	W 20–0	
November 24	Rhode Island State	Brown Stadium; Providence, RI (rivalry)	W 33–7	
November 29	Colgate	Brown Stadium; Providence, RI	W 16–13	
