= 1928 Rutgers Queensmen football team =

American college football season

1928 Rutgers Queensmen football
- Conference: Independent
- Record: 6–3
- Head coach: Harry Rockafeller (2nd season)
- Captain: Stanley Rosen
- Home stadium: Neilson Field

1928 Eastern college football independents records
	Conf.			Overall
Team	W	L	T	W		L		T
Boston College		–		9	–	0	–	0
West Chester		–		8	–	0	–	0
Villanova		–		7	–	0	–	1
Brown		–		8	–	1	–	0
No. 11 Penn		–		8	–	1	–	0
No. 6 Carnegie Tech		–		7	–	1	–	0
No. 9 Army		–		8	–	2	–	0
Drexel		–		8	–	2	–	0
No. 10 NYU		–		8	–	2	–	0
Temple		–		7	–	1	–	2
Lafayette		–		6	–	1	–	2
Princeton		–		5	–	1	–	2
CCNY		–		4	–	1	–	2
Pittsburgh		–		6	–	2	–	1
Harvard		–		5	–	2	–	1
Tufts		–		5	–	2	–	1
Colgate		–		6	–	3	–	0
Rutgers		–		6	–	3	–	0
Bucknell		–		5	–	2	–	3
Columbia		–		5	–	3	–	1
Boston University		–		3	–	3	–	2
Cornell		–		3	–	3	–	2
Syracuse		–		4	–	4	–	1
Yale		–		4	–	4	–	0
Fordham		–		4	–	5	–	0
Franklin & Marshall		–		4	–	5	–	0
Penn State		–		3	–	5	–	1
Lehigh		–		3	–	6	–	0
Washington & Jefferson		–		2	–	5	–	2
Providence		–		1	–	5	–	3
Vermont		–		1	–	7	–	2
Rankings from Dickinson System

The 1928 Rutgers Queensmen football team represented Rutgers University as an independent during the 1928 college football season. In their second season under head coach Harry Rockafeller, the Queensmen compiled a 6–3 record and were outscored by their opponents, 116 to 97.

== Schedule ==
Date	Opponent	Site	Result	Source
September 29	St. John's (MD)	Neilson Field; New Brunswick, NJ	W 12–0	
October 6	Albright	Neilson Field; New Brunswick, NJ	W 19–0	
October 13	Holy Cross	Newark School Stadium; Newark, NJ	L 0–46	
October 20	at NYU	Yankee Stadium; Bronx, NY	L 0–48	
October 27	Delaware	Neilson Field; New Brunswick, NJ	W 34–0	
November 3	Catholic University	Neilson Field; New Brunswick, NJ	W 12–0	
November 10	Lafayette	Neilson Field; New Brunswick, NJ	L 0–17	
November 17	at Lehigh	Taylor Stadium; Bethlehem, PA	W 7–3	
November 24	Swarthmore	Neilson Field; New Brunswick, NJ	W 13–2	
