= 1928 Yale Bulldogs football team =

American college football season

1928 Yale Bulldogs football
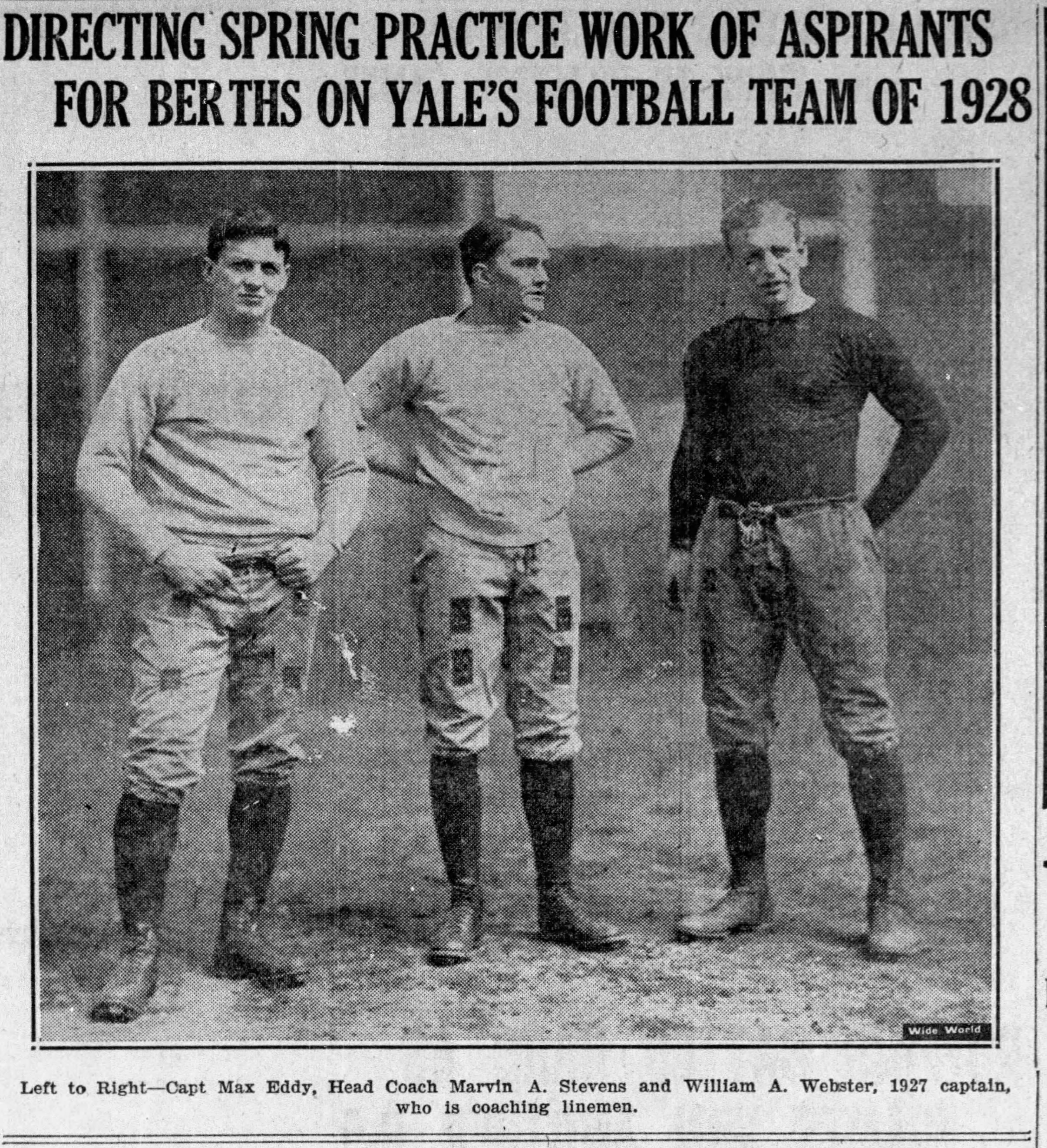
- Conference: Independent
- Record: 4–4
- Head coach: Mal Stevens (1st season)
- Offensive scheme: Single-wing
- Captain: Maxon H. Eddy
- Home stadium: Yale Bowl

1928 Eastern college football independents records
	Conf.			Overall
Team	W	L	T	W		L		T
Boston College		–		9	–	0	–	0
West Chester		–		8	–	0	–	0
Villanova		–		7	–	0	–	1
Brown		–		8	–	1	–	0
No. 11 Penn		–		8	–	1	–	0
No. 6 Carnegie Tech		–		7	–	1	–	0
No. 9 Army		–		8	–	2	–	0
Drexel		–		8	–	2	–	0
No. 10 NYU		–		8	–	2	–	0
Temple		–		7	–	1	–	2
Lafayette		–		6	–	1	–	2
Princeton		–		5	–	1	–	2
CCNY		–		4	–	1	–	2
Pittsburgh		–		6	–	2	–	1
Harvard		–		5	–	2	–	1
Tufts		–		5	–	2	–	1
Colgate		–		6	–	3	–	0
Rutgers		–		6	–	3	–	0
Bucknell		–		5	–	2	–	3
Columbia		–		5	–	3	–	1
Boston University		–		3	–	3	–	2
Cornell		–		3	–	3	–	2
Syracuse		–		4	–	4	–	1
Yale		–		4	–	4	–	0
Fordham		–		4	–	5	–	0
Franklin & Marshall		–		4	–	5	–	0
Penn State		–		3	–	5	–	1
Lehigh		–		3	–	6	–	0
Washington & Jefferson		–		2	–	5	–	2
Providence		–		1	–	5	–	3
Vermont		–		1	–	7	–	2
Rankings from Dickinson System

The 1928 Yale Bulldogs football team represented Yale University in the 1928 college football season. The Bulldogs finished with a 4–4 record under first-year head coach Mal Stevens.

== Schedule ==
Date	Opponent	Site	Result	Attendance	Source
October 6	Maine	Yale Bowl; New Haven, CT	W 27–0		
October 13	Georgia	Yale Bowl; New Haven, CT	W 21–6		
October 20	Brown	Yale Bowl; New Haven, CT	W 32–14		
October 27	Army	Yale Bowl; New Haven, CT	L 6–18	76,000	
November 3	Dartmouth	Yale Bowl; New Haven, CT	W 18–0	45,000	
November 10	Maryland	Yale Bowl; New Haven, CT	L 0–6		
November 17	at Princeton	Palmer Stadium; Princeton, NJ (rivalry)	L 2–12	60,000	
November 24	Harvard	Yale Bowl; New Haven, CT (rivalry)	L 0–17		
