= 1928 Army Cadets football team =

American college football season

1928 Army Cadets football
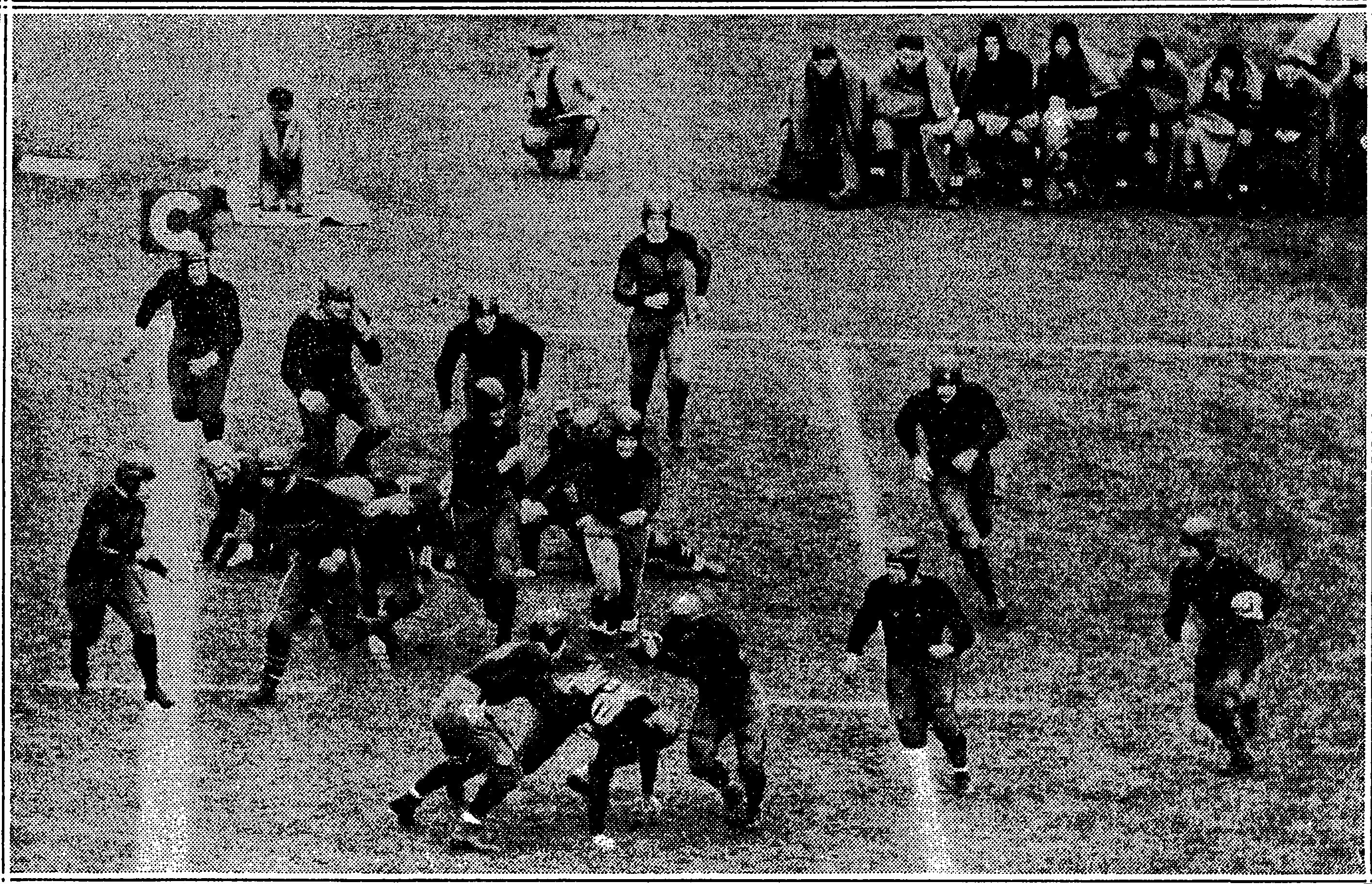
- The 1928 Cadets against the Yale Bulldogs
- Conference: Independent
- Record: 8–2
- Head coach: Biff Jones (3rd season)
- Offensive scheme: Single-wing
- Captain: Bud Sprague
- Home stadium: Michie Stadium

1928 Eastern college football independents records
	Conf.			Overall
Team	W	L	T	W		L		T
Boston College		–		9	–	0	–	0
West Chester		–		8	–	0	–	0
Villanova		–		7	–	0	–	1
Brown		–		8	–	1	–	0
No. 11 Penn		–		8	–	1	–	0
No. 6 Carnegie Tech		–		7	–	1	–	0
No. 9 Army		–		8	–	2	–	0
Drexel		–		8	–	2	–	0
No. 10 NYU		–		8	–	2	–	0
Temple		–		7	–	1	–	2
Lafayette		–		6	–	1	–	2
Princeton		–		5	–	1	–	2
CCNY		–		4	–	1	–	2
Pittsburgh		–		6	–	2	–	1
Harvard		–		5	–	2	–	1
Tufts		–		5	–	2	–	1
Colgate		–		6	–	3	–	0
Rutgers		–		6	–	3	–	0
Bucknell		–		5	–	2	–	3
Columbia		–		5	–	3	–	1
Boston University		–		3	–	3	–	2
Cornell		–		3	–	3	–	2
Syracuse		–		4	–	4	–	1
Yale		–		4	–	4	–	0
Fordham		–		4	–	5	–	0
Franklin & Marshall		–		4	–	5	–	0
Penn State		–		3	–	5	–	1
Lehigh		–		3	–	6	–	0
Washington & Jefferson		–		2	–	5	–	2
Providence		–		1	–	5	–	3
Vermont		–		1	–	7	–	2
Rankings from Dickinson System

The 1928 Army Cadets football team represented the United States Military Academy as an independent during the 1928 college football season. Led by head coach Biff Jones, the team finished the season with a record of 8–2. The Cadets offense scored 215 points, while the defense allowed 79 points. The team was ranked No. 9 in the nation in the Dickinson System ratings released in December 1928. The 1928 season was one of the few years in which Army did not play the Navy Midshipmen in the Army–Navy Game.

Against Notre Dame at Yankee Stadium, with the game scoreless at halftime, legendary Notre Dame coach Knute Rockne gave his "win one for the Gipper" speech (with reference to All-American halfback George Gipp, who died in 1920); Notre Dame went on to win, 12–6. Army participated in the best-attended college football game at Yankee Stadium on December 1, when Army lost to Stanford 26–0 before 86,000.

== Schedule ==
Date	Opponent	Site	Result	Attendance	Source
September 29	Boston University	Michie Stadium; West Point, NY	W 35–0		
October 6	SMU	Michie Stadium; West Point, NY	W 14–13		
October 13	Providence College	Michie Stadium; West Point, NY	W 44–0		
October 20	at Harvard	Harvard Stadium; Boston, MA	W 15–0		
October 27	at Yale	Yale Bowl; New Haven, CT	W 18–6		
November 3	DePauw	Michie Stadium; West Point, NY	W 38–12		
November 10	vs. Notre Dame	Yankee Stadium; Bronx, NY (rivalry)	L 6–12	78,188	
November 17	Carleton	Michie Stadium; West Point, NY	W 32–7		
November 24	Nebraska	Michie Stadium; West Point, NY	W 13–3		
December 1	vs. Stanford	Yankee Stadium; Bronx, NY	L 0–26	86,000	
