= Bernie Crowl =

American football player (1908–1998)

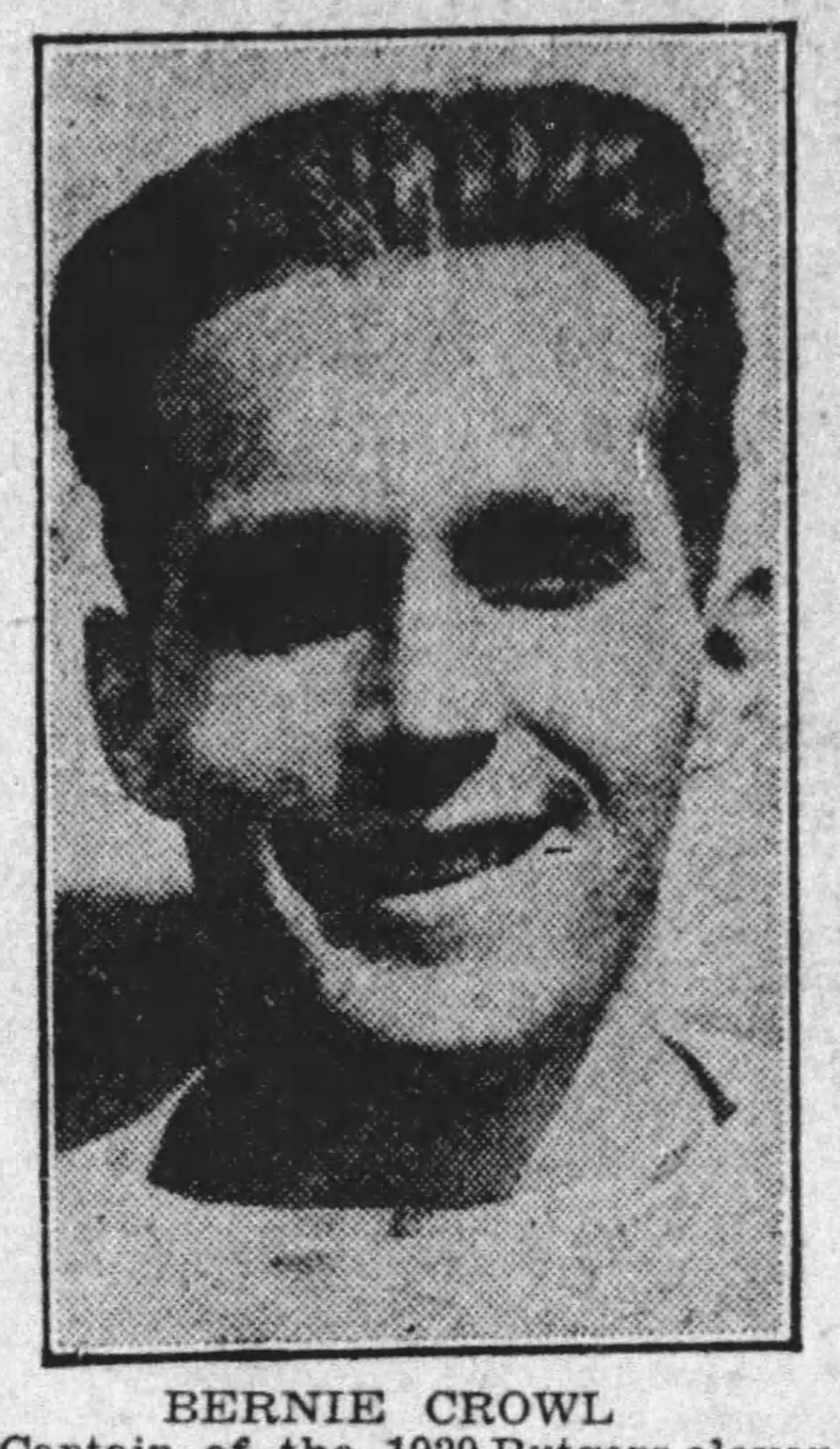
- Crowl at Rutgers, 1929

Profile
- Positions: Guard, center

Personal information
- Born: March 25, 1908; Brooklyn
- Died: November 12, 1998 (aged 90); East Windsor, Connecticut
- Listed height: 5 ft 10 in (1.78 m)
- Listed weight: 185 lb (84 kg)

Career information
- High school: Ridgefield Park (NJ)
- College: Rutgers

Career history
- Brooklyn Dodgers (1930)

Richard Bernard Crowl (March 25, 1908 – November 12, 1998) was an American football player.

A native of Connecticut, he played college football for Rutgers University. He was captain of the 1929 Rutgers team and was dubbed the "Iron Man of Eastern Football" as he never suffered an injury serious enough to be removed from a game. He was recognized in Ripley's "Believe It or Not" column for having played the full 60 minutes of 38 consecutive football games.

Crowl next played professional football in the National Football League (NFL) as a guard and center for the Brooklyn Dodgers. He appeared in two NFL games during the 1930 season.

After retiring from football, he worked for the American Express Company, The U.S. Treasury Department, and the United Nations Relief and Rehabilitation Administration. He also served four years in the U.S. Army during World War II. He served as a foreign service officer with U.S. State Department for 20 years, including postings in Iran, Turkey, and the Netherlands. He lived in Vernon, Connecticut, from 1965 until his death in 1998.
