= Sid Crowl =

English footballer

Personal information
- Full name: Sidney Robert Crowl
- Date of birth: 18 March 1888
- Place of birth: Enfield, England
- Date of death: 1971 (aged 82–83)
- Position: Outside left

Senior career*
Years	Team	Apps	(Gls)
- Enfield
1913–1914	Tottenham Hotspur	1	(0)
- * Club domestic league appearances and goals

Sidney Robert Crowl (18 March 1888 – 1971) was a professional footballer who played for Enfield and Tottenham Hotspur.

== Football career ==
Crowl, an outside left began his career at Enfield before joining Tottenham Hotspur in 1913 where he played in one match.
