= Providence Friars football =

- First season: 1921
- Last season: 1941
- Location: Providence, Rhode Island
- Stadiums: Hendricken Field; Cycledrome
- Colors: Black, white, and silver
- All-time record: 67–86–16 (.444)

For information on all Providence College sports, see Providence Friars

The Providence Friars football program was the intercollegiate American football team for Providence College located in Providence, Rhode Island. The school's first football team was fielded in 1921. The program was discontinued by the college in December 1941.

== Notable former players ==
Providence Friars football players who played professionally
Player	Position	Professional seasons	Team(s)
Bill Connor	G/T	1929	Boston Bulldogs
Bill Connor	G/T	1930	Newark Tornadoes
Jack Triggs		1926	Providence Steam Roller
Fred Dagata		1931	Providence Steam Roller
Hank Soar	RB/DB	1937–1946	New York Giants
Chuck Avedisian	G	1942–1944	New York Giants
