= 1928 Southern Conference football season =

- League: NCAA
- Sport: College football
- Duration: September 22, 1928 through January 1, 1929
- Teams: 22

Regular Season
- Season champions: Georgia Tech

Football seasons
- 1927 1929

1928 Southern Conference football standings
	Conf.					Overall
Team	W		L		T	W		L		T
No. 3 Georgia Tech $	7	–	0	–	0	10	–	0	–	0
Tennessee	6	–	0	–	1	9	–	0	–	1
Florida	6	–	1	–	0	8	–	1	–	0
VPI	4	–	1	–	0	7	–	2	–	0
Alabama	6	–	2	–	0	6	–	3	–	0
LSU	3	–	1	–	1	6	–	2	–	1
Clemson	4	–	2	–	0	8	–	3	–	0
Vanderbilt	4	–	2	–	0	8	–	2	–	0
Tulane	3	–	3	–	1	6	–	3	–	1
Ole Miss	3	–	3	–	0	5	–	4	–	0
North Carolina	2	–	2	–	2	5	–	3	–	2
Kentucky	2	–	2	–	1	4	–	3	–	1
South Carolina	2	–	2	–	1	6	–	2	–	2
Maryland	2	–	3	–	1	6	–	3	–	1
VMI	2	–	3	–	1	5	–	3	–	2
Georgia	2	–	4	–	0	4	–	5	–	0
NC State	1	–	3	–	1	4	–	5	–	1
Mississippi A&M	1	–	4	–	0	2	–	4	–	2
Virginia	1	–	6	–	0	2	–	6	–	1
Washington and Lee	1	–	6	–	0	2	–	8	–	0
Sewanee	0	–	5	–	0	2	–	7	–	0
Auburn	0	–	7	–	0	1	–	8	–	0
$ – Conference champion; Rankings from Dickinson System

The 1928 Southern Conference football season was the college football games played by the member schools of the Southern Conference as part of the 1928 college football season. The season began on September 22.

In the annual Rose Bowl game, Georgia Tech defeated the California Golden Bears by a score of 8–7. The game was notable for a play by California All-American Roy Riegels in which he scooped up a Georgia Tech fumble and ran towards his own goal line. The two-point safety on the ensuing punt proved to be the margin of victory. Georgia Tech thus claims a national championship.

The Florida Gators led the nation in scoring with 336 points, but had their undefeated campaign derailed in the final game by the South's biggest upset that season, a controversial loss to Tennessee.

Tulane back Bill Banker led the conference in individual scoring with 128 points, tying a school record set by Peggy Flournoy in 1925 which was unbroken until 2007 by Matt Forte.

== Season overview ==
=== Results and team statistics ===
Conf. Rank	Team	Head coach	Overall record	Conf. record	PPG	PAG
1	Georgia Tech	William Alexander	10–0	7–0	22.1	**4.7**
2	Tennessee	Robert Neyland	9–0–1	6–0–1	24.9	5.1
3	Florida	Charlie Bachman	8–1	6–1	**37.3**	4.9
4	VPI	Andy Gustafson	7–2	4–1	22.0	10.2
5 (tie)	Alabama	Wallace Wade	6–3	6–2	20.8	8.3
5 (tie)	LSU	Mike Donahue	6–2–1	3–1–1	20.0	5.0
7 (tie)	Clemson	Josh Cody	8–3	4–2	17.5	7.0
7 (tie)	Vanderbilt	Dan McGugin	8–2	4–2	15.2	5.7
9 (tie)	Tulane	Bernie Bierman	6–3–1	3–3–1	26.4	7.6
9 (tie)	Ole Miss	Homer Hazel	5–4	3–3	17.3	13.4
9 (tie)	North Carolina	Chuck Collins	5–3–2	2–2–2	18.6	11.5
9 (tie)	Kentucky	Harry Gamage	4–3–1	2–2–1	12.5	5.1
9 (tie)	South Carolina	Billy Laval	6–2–2	2–2–1	9.6	7.0
14 (tie)	Maryland	Curley Byrd	6–3–1	2–3–1	13.2	7.0
14 (tie)	VMI	W. C. Raftery	5–3–2	2–3–1	9.5	7.5
16	Georgia	Harry Mehre	4–5	2–4	13.6	12.6
17	NC State	Gus Tebell	4–5–1	1–3–1	15.7	10.0
18	Mississippi A&M	John W. Hancock	2–4–2	1–4	8.8	20.8
19 (tie)	Virginia	Greasy Neale	2–6–1	1–6	13.4	15.8
19 (tie)	Washington and Lee	Pat Herron	2–8	1–6	13.9	18.4
21	Sewanee	M. S. Bennett	2–7	0–5	9.9	31.9
22	Auburn	George Bohler	1–8	0–7	4.1	17.1

Key

PPG = Average of points scored per game

PAG = Average of points allowed per game

=== Regular season ===
Index to colors and formatting
Non-conference matchup; SoCon member won
Non-conference matchup; SoCon member lost
Non-conference matchup; tie
Conference matchup

SoCon teams in bold.

==== Week One ====
Date	Visiting team	Home team	Site	Result	Attendance	Reference
September 22	Newberry	**Clemson**	Riggs Field • Calhoun, South Carolina	**W** 30–0		
September 22	Erskine	**South Carolina**	Melton Field • Columbia, South Carolina	**W** 19–0		
September 22	Hampden–Sydney	**VMI**	Alumni Field • Lexington, Virginia	**W** 14–7		

==== Week Two ====
Date	Visiting team	Home team	Site	Result	Attendance	Reference
September 28	Birmingham–Southern	**Auburn**	Cramton Bowl • Montgomery, Alabama	**L** 6–0		
September 29	Davidson	**Clemson**	Riggs Field • Calhoun, South Carolina	**W** 6–0		
September 29	Washington College	**Maryland**	Byrd Stadium • College Park, Maryland	**W** 31–0		
September 29	Arkansas	**Ole Miss**	Hemingway Stadium • Oxford, Mississippi	**W** 25–0		
September 29	Ouachita Baptist	**Mississippi A&M**	Scott Field • Starkville, Mississippi	**W** 20–6		
September 29	Wake Forest	**North Carolina**	Kenan Memorial Stadium • Chapel Hill, North Carolina	**W** 65–0	15,000	
September 29	Elon	**NC State**	Riddick Stadium • Raleigh, North Carolina	**W** 57–0		
September 29	Bryson College	**Sewanee**	Hardee Field • Sewanee, Tennessee	**W** 14–0		
September 29	**South Carolina**	Chicago	Stagg Field • Chicago, Illinois	**W** 6–0	35,000	
September 29	Maryville (TN)	**Tennessee**	Shields–Watkins Field • Knoxville, Tennessee	**W** 41–0		
September 29	**Tulane**	Louisiana Normal	Tulane Stadium • New Orleans, Louisiana	**W** 65–0		
September 29	**Vanderbilt**	Chattanooga	Chamberlain Field • Chattanooga, Tennessee	**W** 20–0		
September 29	Randolph–Macon	**Virginia**	Lambeth Field • Charlottesville, Virginia	**W** 66–0		
September 29	Richmond	**VMI**	Alumni Field • Lexington, Virginia	**T** 6–6		
September 29	Roanoke	**VPI**	Miles Stadium • Blacksburg, Virginia	**W** 34–7		
September 29	Lynchburg	**Washington & Lee**	Wilson Field • Lexington, Virginia	**W** 56–0		

==== Week Three ====
Date	Visiting team	Home team	Site	Result	Attendance	Reference
October 6	**Ole Miss**	**Alabama**	Denny Field • Tuscaloosa, Alabama	**ALA** 27–0	6,000	
October 6	**Clemson**	**Auburn**	Drake Field • Auburn, Alabama	**CLEM** 33–6		
October 6	Florida Southern	**Florida**	Fleming Field • Gainesville, Florida	**W** 26–0	4,000	
October 6	Mercer	**Georgia**	Sanford Field • Athens, Georgia	**W** 52–0		
October 6	**VMI**	**Georgia Tech**	Grant Field • Atlanta, Georgia	**GT** 13–0	18,000	
October 6	Carson–Newman	**Kentucky**	Stoll Field • Lexington, Kentucky	**W** 61–0		
October 6	Southwestern Louisiana	**LSU**	Tiger Stadium • Baton Rouge, Louisiana	**W** 46–0		
October 6	**North Carolina**	**Maryland**	Byrd Stadium • College Park, Maryland	**UNC** 26–19		
October 6	**Tulane**	**Mississippi A&M**	Municipal Stadium • Jackson, Mississippi	**TUL** 51–6		
October 6	**Sewanee**	Texas A&M	Fair Park Stadium • Dallas, Texas	**L** 69–0		
October 6	Centre	**Tennessee**	Shields–Watkins Field • Knoxville, Tennessee	**W** 41–7		
October 6	Colgate	**Vanderbilt**	Dudley Field • Nashville, Tennessee	**W** 12–7		
October 6	**South Carolina**	**Virginia**	Lambeth Field • Charlottesville, Virginia	**SCAR** 24–13	7,500	
October 6	Hampden–Sydney	**VPI**	Miles Stadium • Blacksburg, Virginia	**W** 32–7		
October 6	**NC State**	**Washington & Lee**	Wilson Field • Lexington, Virginia	**W&L** 38–6		

==== Week Four ====
Date	Visiting team	Home team	Site	Result	Attendance	Reference
October 12	**NC State**	**Clemson**	Pee Dee Fairgrounds • Florence, South Carolina	**CLEM** 7–0	4,000	
October 13	**Alabama**	**Mississippi A&M**	Scott Field • Starkville, Mississippi	**ALA** 46–0	8,000	
October 13	**Auburn**	**Florida**	Fleming Field • Gainesville, Florida	**FLA** 27–0	6,000	
October 13	**Georgia Tech**	**Tulane**	Tulane Stadium • New Orleans, Louisiana	**GT** 12–0		
October 13	**Georgia**	Yale	Yale Bowl • New Haven, Connecticut	**L** 21–6		
October 13	**Maryland**	**South Carolina**	Melton Field • Columbia, South Carolina	**SCAR** 21–7		
October 13	Louisiana College	**LSU**	Tiger Stadium • Baton Rouge, Louisiana	**W** 41–0		
October 13	**Ole Miss**	**Tennessee**	Shields–Watkins Field • Knoxville, Tennessee	**TENN** 13–12		
October 13	**North Carolina**	Harvard	Harvard Stadium • Boston, Massachusetts	**L** 20–0		
October 13	Transylvania	**Sewanee**	Hardee Field • Sewanee, Tennessee	**L** 14–13		
October 13	**Vanderbilt**	Texas	Fair Park Stadium • Dallas, Texas	**W** 13–12		
October 13	**Virginia**	Princeton	Palmer Stadium • Princeton, New Jersey	**T** 0–0		
October 13	Roanoke	**VMI**	Alumni Field • Lexington, Virginia	**W** 31–13		
October 13	**VPI**	Colgate	Whitnall Field • Hamilton, New York	**L** 35–14		
October 13	**Washington & Lee**	**Kentucky**	Stoll Field • Lexington, Kentucky	**UK** 6–0		

==== Week Five ====
Date	Visiting team	Home team	Site	Result	Attendance	Reference
October 18	Wake Forest	**NC State**	Riddick Stadium • Raleigh, North Carolina	**W** 37–0		
October 19	Erskine	**Clemson**	Riggs Field • Calhoun, South Carolina	**W** 52–0		
October 19	Presbyterian	**South Carolina**	Melton Field • Columbia, South Carolina	**W** 13–0		
October 20	**Tennessee**	**Alabama**	Denny Stadium • Tuscaloosa, Alabama	**TENN** 15–13		
October 20	**Ole Miss**	**Auburn**	Legion Field • Birmingham, Alabama	**MISS** 19–0		
October 20	Mercer	**Florida**	Fleming Field • Gainesville, Florida	**W** 73–0	8,000	
October 20	Furman	**Georgia**	Sanford Field • Athens, Georgia	**W** 7–0		
October 20	Notre Dame	**Georgia Tech**	Grant Field • Atlanta, Georgia	**W** 13–0	35,000	
October 20	**Kentucky**	Northwestern	Dyche Stadium • Evanston, IL	**L** 7–0		
October 20	**Mississippi A&M**	**LSU**	Municipal Stadium • Jackson, Mississippi	**LSU** 31–0		
October 20	Western Maryland	**Maryland**	Byrd Stadium • College Park, Maryland	**W** 13–6		
October 20	**VPI**	**North Carolina**	Kenan Memorial Stadium • Chapel Hill, North Carolina	**VPI** 16–14	9,000	
October 20	Cumberland (TN)	**Sewanee**	Hardee Field • Sewanee, Tennessee	**W** 38–0	5,000	
October 20	**Vanderbilt**	**Tulane**	Tulane Stadium • New Orleans, Louisiana	**VAN** 13–6		
October 20	**Virginia**	**VMI**	Alumni Field • Lexington, Virginia	**VMI** 9–0		
October 20	**Washington & Lee**	West Virginia	Laidley Field • Charleston, West Virginia	**L** 22–0		

==== Week Six ====
Date	Visiting team	Home team	Site	Result	Attendance	Reference
October 25	**Clemson**	**South Carolina**	State Fairgrounds • Columbia, South Carolina	**CLEM** 32–0	14,000	
October 27	**Sewanee**	**Alabama**	Legion Field • Birmingham, Alabama	**ALA** 42–12	11,743	
October 27	Howard (AL)	**Auburn**	Drake Field • Auburn, Alabama	**W** 25–6		
October 27	**NC State**	**Florida**	Fairfield Stadium • Jacksonville, Florida	**FLA** 14–7	13,000	
October 27	**Tulane**	**Georgia**	Sanford Field • Athens, Georgia	**UGA** 20–14		
October 27	**Georgia Tech**	**North Carolina**	Kenan Memorial Stadium • Chapel Hill, North Carolina	**GT** 20–7	20,000	
October 27	Centre	**Kentucky**	Stoll Field • Lexington, Kentucky	**W** 8–0		
October 27	Spring Hill	**LSU**	Tiger Stadium • Baton Rouge, Louisiana	**W** 30–7		
October 27	**Maryland**	**VMI**	Tate Field • Richmond, Virginia	**T** 0–0		
October 27	**Ole Miss**	Loyola (LA)	Loyola University Stadium • New Orleans, Louisiana	**L** 34–14		
October 27	**Virginia**	**Vanderbilt**	Dudley Field • Nashville, Tennessee	**VAN** 34–0		
October 27	King	**VPI**	Miles Stadium • Blacksburg, Virginia	**W** 54–0		
October 27	**Washington & Lee**	**Tennessee**	Shields–Watkins Field • Knoxville, Tennessee	**TENN** 26–7		

==== Week Seven ====
Date	Visiting team	Home team	Site	Result	Attendance	Reference
November 1	**South Carolina**	The Citadel	County Fairgrounds • Orangeburg, South Carolina	**T** 0–0	2,000	
November 3	**Alabama**	Wisconsin	Camp Randall Stadium • Madison, Wisconsin	**L** 15–0	25,000	
November 3	**Auburn**	**Georgia**	Memorial Stadium • Columbus, Georgia	**UGA** 13–0		
November 3	**Clemson**	**Ole Miss**	Hemingway Stadium • Oxford, Mississippi	**MISS** 26–7		
November 3	**Sewanee**	**Florida**	Fairfield Stadium • Jacksonville, Florida	**FLA** 71–6	6,500	
November 3	Oglethorpe	**Georgia Tech**	Grant Field • Atlanta, Georgia	**W** 32–7	8,000	
November 3	Arkansas	**LSU**	State Fair Stadium • Shreveport, Louisiana	**L** 7–0		
November 3	**Maryland**	**VPI**	League Park • Norfolk, Virginia	**VPI** 9–6	9,000	
November 3	**Mississippi A&M**	Michigan State	College Field • East Lansing, Michigan	**T** 6–6		
November 3	**North Carolina**	**NC State**	Riddick Stadium • Raleigh, North Carolina	**T** 6–6		
November 3	Carson–Newman	**Tennessee**	Shields–Watkins Field • Knoxville, Tennessee	**W** 57–0		
November 3	**Kentucky**	**Vanderbilt**	Dudley Field • Nashville, Tennessee	**VAN** 14–7		
November 3	**Washington & Lee**	**Virginia**	Lambeth Field • Charlottesville, Virginia	**UVA** 20–13		

==== Week Eight ====
Date	Visiting team	Home team	Site	Result	Attendance	Reference
November 10	**Kentucky**	**Alabama**	Cramton Bowl • Montgomery, Alabama	**ALA** 14–0	7,500	
November 10	**Auburn**	**Tulane**	Tulane Stadium • New Orleans, Louisiana	**TUL** 13–12		
November 10	**Clemson**	**VMI**	Lynchburg, Virginia	**CLEM** 12–0		
November 10	**Florida**	**Georgia**	Municipal Stadium • Savannah, Georgia	**FLA** 26–6	16,000	
November 10	**Vanderbilt**	**Georgia Tech**	Grant Field • Atlanta, Georgia	**GT** 19–7	30,000	
November 10	**Ole Miss**	**LSU**	Tiger Stadium • Baton Rouge, Louisiana	**LSU** 19–6		
November 10	**Maryland**	Yale	Yale Bowl • New Haven, Connecticut	**W** 6–0		
November 10	Centenary	**Mississippi A&M**	Scott Field • Starkville, Mississippi	**T** 6–6		
November 10	Davidson	**NC State**	World War Memorial Stadium • Greensboro, North Carolina	**W** 14–7		
November 10	**South Carolina**	**North Carolina**	Kenan Memorial Stadium • Chapel Hill, North Carolina	**T** 0–0	6,000	
November 10	**Sewanee**	**Tennessee**	Shields–Watkins Field • Knoxville, Tennessee	**TENN** 37–0		
November 10	**Virginia**	**VPI**	Miles Stadium • Blacksburg, Virginia	**VPI** 20–0	5,000–7,000	
November 10	**Washington & Lee**	Princeton	Palmer Stadium • Princeton, New Jersey	**L** 25–12		

==== Week Nine ====
Date	Visiting team	Home team	Site	Result	Attendance	Reference
November 17	**Alabama**	**Georgia Tech**	Grant Field • Atlanta, Georgia	**GT** 33–13	26,000	
November 17	**Mississippi A&M**	**Auburn**	Legion Field • Birmingham, Alabama	**MSA&M** 13–0		
November 17	**Clemson**	**Florida**	Fairfield Stadium • Jacksonville, Florida	**FLA** 27–6	15,000	
November 17	**LSU**	**Georgia**	Sanford Field • Athens, Georgia	**LSU** 13–12		
November 17	**Virginia**	**Maryland**	Byrd Stadium • College Park, Maryland	**MD** 18–2		
November 17	**Ole Miss**	Southwestern (TN)	Fargason Field • Memphis, Tennessee	**W** 34–2		
November 17	**North Carolina**	Davidson	Richardson Field • Davidson, North Carolina	**W** 30–7	7,000	
November 17	Furman	**South Carolina**	Melton Field • Columbia, South Carolina	**W** 6–0		
November 17	**Sewanee**	**Tulane**	Tulane Stadium • New Orleans, Louisiana	**TUL** 41–6	12,000	
November 17	**Tennessee**	**Vanderbilt**	Dudley Field • Nashville, Tennessee	**TENN** 6–0		
November 17	**VMI**	**Kentucky**	Stoll Field • Lexington, Kentucky	**UK** 23–12		
November 17	**VPI**	**Washington & Lee**	Wilson Field • Lexington, Virginia	**VPI** 13–7		

==== Week Ten ====
Date	Visiting team	Home team	Site	Result	Attendance	Reference
November 24	**Washington & Lee**	**Maryland**	Griffith Stadium • Washington, DC	**MD** 6–0		
November 24	**NC State**	Michigan State	College Field • East Lansing, Michigan	**L** 7–0		
November 24	Louisiana College	**Tulane**	Tulane Stadium • New Orleans, Louisiana	**W** 47–7	8,000	
November 24	Centre	**Vanderbilt**	Dudley Field • Nashville, Tennessee	**W** 26–0		

==== Week Eleven ====
Date	Visiting team	Home team	Site	Result	Attendance	Reference
November 29	Georgia	**Alabama**	Legion Field • Birmingham, Alabama	**ALA** 19–0	20,184	
November 29	Clemson	Furman	Manly Field • Greenville, South Carolina	**W** 27–12	12,500	
November 29	Washington & Lee	**Florida**	Fairfield Stadium • Jacksonville, Florida	**FLA** 60–6	14,000	
November 29	Auburn	**Georgia Tech**	Grant Field • Atlanta, Georgia	**GT** 51–0	20,000	
November 29	Kentucky	**Tennessee**	Shields–Watkins Field • Knoxville, Tennessee	**T** 0–0		
November 29	LSU	**Tulane**	Tulane Stadium • New Orleans, Louisiana	**T** 0–0		
November 29	Maryland	Johns Hopkins	Baltimore Stadium • Baltimore, Maryland	**W** 26–6		
November 29	Ole Miss	**Mississippi A&M**	Scott Field • Starkville, Mississippi	**MISS** 20–19		
November 29	North Carolina	**Virginia**	Lambeth Field • Charlottesville, Virginia	**UNC** 24–20	18,000-20,000	
November 29	South Carolina	**NC State**	Riddick Stadium • Raleigh, North Carolina	**NCST** 18–7		
November 29	VMI	**VPI**	Maher Field • Roanoke, Virginia	**VMI** 16–6		
December 1	Sewanee	**Vanderbilt**	Dudley Field • Nashville, Tennessee	**VAN** 13–0	10,000	

==== Week Twelve ====
Date	Visiting team	Home team	Site	Result	Attendance	Reference
December 8	**LSU**	**Alabama**	Legion Field • Birmingham, Alabama	**ALA** 13–0		
December 8	**Clemson**	The Citadel	Johnson Hagood Stadium • Charleston, South Carolina	**L** 12–7		
December 8	**Georgia**	**Georgia Tech**	Grant Field • Atlanta, Georgia	**GT** 20–6	40,000	
December 8	Duke	**North Carolina**	Kenan Memorial Stadium • Chapel Hill, North Carolina	**W** 14–7	10,000	
December 8	**Florida**	**Tennessee**	Shields–Watkins Field • Knoxville, Tennessee	**TENN** 13–12	13,000	

== Bowl games ==
Date	Bowl Game	Site	SIAA Team	Opponent	Score
January 1, 1929	Rose Bowl	Rose Bowl • Pasadena, California	Georgia Tech	California	GT 8–7

== Awards and honors ==
=== All-Americans ===
- E - Dale Van Sickel, Florida (AP-1, NEA-1, CO-Utility, UP-HM)
- E – Dick Abernathy, Vanderbilt (CP-1, UP-3)
- T – Frank Speer, Georgia Tech (AP-1)
- T – Jimmy Steele, Florida (NEA-2)
- G – Bull Brown, Vanderbilt (UP-2)
- G – Bill McRae, Florida (UP-2)
- C – Peter Pund, Georgia Tech (CO-1, INS, NEA-1, UP-1, WC-1, CP-2, AP-3, AAB)
- HB – Warner Mizell, Georgia Tech (AP-2, CP-2, INS, NANA, NEA-2, UP-2)
- HB – Clyde Crabtree, Florida (AP-3, NEA-3, UP-3 [fb])
- HB – Bill Banker, Tulane (UP-2)
- FB – Gerald Snyder, Maryland (AP-3)

=== All-Southern team ===
The followers players were picked for the composite first All-Southern team of more than one hundred sports writers and coaches compiled by the Associated Press (AP). The United Press (UP) also selected a team:

Position	Name	First-team selectors	Team
QB	Clyde Crabtree	AP, UP	Florida
HB	Warner Mizell	AP, UP	Georgia Tech
HB	Bill Banker	AP, UP	Tulane
FB	Gerald Snyder	AP	Maryland
E	Dale Van Sickel	AP, UP	Florida
T	Frank Speer	AP, UP	Georgia Tech
G	Fred Vaughan	AP	NC State
C	Peter Pund	AP, UP	Georgia Tech
G	Raleigh Drennon	AP	Georgia Tech
T	Jess Tinsley	AP	LSU
E	Dick Abernathy	AP	Vanderbilt
