= Russ Cohen =

American football player, coach, and administrator

- Cohen pictured in The Cincinnatian 1937, Cincinnati yearbook

Biographical details
- Born: February 13, 1893; Augusta, Georgia, U.S.
- Died: April 7, 1981 (aged 88); Waynesboro, Georgia, U.S.

Playing career
- 1913–1916: Vanderbilt
- Position: End

Coaching career (HC unless noted)
- 1922: Mercer (assistant)
- 1923–1926: Alabama (assistant)
- 1928–1931: LSU
- 1932: Vanderbilt (assistant)
- 1935–1937: Cincinnati
- 1938–1946: VMI (assistant)
- 1947–1954: Clemson (backfield/defense)

Administrative career (AD unless noted)
- 1928–1931: LSU

Head coaching record
- Overall: 31–25–4

Accomplishments and honors

Awards
- All-Southern (1915)

Henry Russell Cohen (February 13, 1893 – April 7, 1981) was an American college football player, coach, and athletics administrator. He served as the head football coach at Louisiana State University (LSU) from 1928 to 1931 and at the University of Cincinnati from 1935 to 1937, compiling a career college football coaching record of 31–25–4.

== Playing career ==
Cohen played as a prominent end for Dan McGugin's Vanderbilt Commodores football teams, serving as captain of its "point-a-minute" Southern Intercollegiate Athletic Association (SIAA) champion 1915 team, with the likes of Josh Cody and Irby Curry. Cohen was selected All-Southern the same year.

== Coaching career ==
Cohen was first hired by Josh Cody at Mercer. He then scouted teams for Wallace Wade at the University of Alabama.

=== LSU ===
As was tradition for football coaches at the time, he also served as the athletics director at LSU during his tenure as head football coach. His record with the LSU Tigers was 23–13–1. McGugin recommended Cohen for the LSU job. Huey Long was an ardent supporter of the team.

Cohen's best year at LSU was probably his first, in 1928. Led by All-Southern captain Jess Tinsley, the Tigers posted a 6–2–1 record, suffering losses to Arkansas and Wade's Alabama. Star halfback Percy Brown broke his shoulder against Alabama. The tie was to Bill Banker and rival Tulane, which was as good as its ever been from 1929 to 1931. In 1931 LSU played its first night game in Tiger Stadium, a 31–0 victory over Spring Hill.

=== Cincinnati ===
With the Cincinnati Bearcats, he compiled an 8–12–3 mark.

== Head coaching record ==
Year	Team	Overall	Conference	Standing	Bowl/playoffs
LSU Tigers (Southern Conference) (1928–1931)
1928	LSU	6–2–1	3–1–1	6th	
1929	LSU	6–3	3–2	10th	
1930	LSU	6–4	2–4	16th	
1931	LSU	5–4	3–2	7th	
LSU:		23–13–1	11–9–1		
Cincinnati Bearcats (Buckeye Athletic Association) (1935–1937)
1935	Cincinnati	7–2	3–2	T–2nd	
1936	Cincinnati	1–5–3	1–2–2	5th	
1937	Cincinnati	0–5*	0–1		
Cincinnati:		8–12–3	4–5–2	*Last 5 games of season were coached by Wade Woodworth.	
Total:		31–25–4			
