= 1928 VPI Gobblers football team =

American college football season

1928 VPI Gobblers football
- Conference: Southern Conference
- Record: 7–2 (4–1 SoCon)
- Head coach: Andy Gustafson (3rd season)
- Captains: Albert Ewell Bailey; Lloyd Broderick Nutter
- Home stadium: Miles Stadium

1928 Southern Conference football standings
	Conf.					Overall
Team	W		L		T	W		L		T
No. 3 Georgia Tech $	7	–	0	–	0	10	–	0	–	0
Tennessee	6	–	0	–	1	9	–	0	–	1
Florida	6	–	1	–	0	8	–	1	–	0
VPI	4	–	1	–	0	7	–	2	–	0
Alabama	6	–	2	–	0	6	–	3	–	0
LSU	3	–	1	–	1	6	–	2	–	1
Clemson	4	–	2	–	0	8	–	3	–	0
Vanderbilt	4	–	2	–	0	8	–	2	–	0
Tulane	3	–	3	–	1	6	–	3	–	1
Ole Miss	3	–	3	–	0	5	–	4	–	0
North Carolina	2	–	2	–	2	5	–	3	–	2
Kentucky	2	–	2	–	1	4	–	3	–	1
South Carolina	2	–	2	–	1	6	–	2	–	2
Maryland	2	–	3	–	1	6	–	3	–	1
VMI	2	–	3	–	1	5	–	3	–	2
Georgia	2	–	4	–	0	4	–	5	–	0
NC State	1	–	3	–	1	4	–	5	–	1
Mississippi A&M	1	–	4	–	0	2	–	4	–	2
Virginia	1	–	6	–	0	2	–	6	–	1
Washington and Lee	1	–	6	–	0	2	–	8	–	0
Sewanee	0	–	5	–	0	2	–	7	–	0
Auburn	0	–	7	–	0	1	–	8	–	0
$ – Conference champion; Rankings from Dickinson System

The 1928 VPI Gobblers football team represented Virginia Polytechnic Institute in the 1928 Southern Conference football season. The team was led by their head coach Andy Gustafson and finished with a record of seven wins and two losses (7–2). This was the senior season for the "Pony Express" backfield which included Frank Peake, Herbert McEver, Scotty MacArthur, and Tommy Tomko.

== Schedule ==
Date	Time	Opponent	Site	Result	Attendance	Source
September 29		Roanoke*	Miles Stadium; Blacksburg, VA	W 34–7		
October 6		Hampden–Sydney*	Miles Stadium; Blacksburg, VA	W 32–7		
October 13		at Colgate*	Whitnall Field; Hamilton, NY	L 14-35	3,000	
October 20		at North Carolina	Kenan Memorial Stadium; Chapel Hill, NC	W 16-14	9,000	
October 27		King*	Miles Stadium; Blacksburg, VA	W 54–0		
November 3	2:30 p.m.	vs. Maryland	League Park; Norfolk, VA	W 9–6	6,000+	
November 10		Virginia	Miles Stadium; Blacksburg, VA (rivalry)	W 20–0	5,000–7,000	
November 17	2:00 p.m.	at Washington and Lee	Wilson Field; Lexington, VA	W 13–7	5,000	
November 29		vs. VMI	Maher Field; Roanoke, VA (rivalry)	L 6-16	20,000	
*Non-conference game; All times are in Eastern time

== Before the season ==
The 1927 VPI Gobblers football team compiled a 5–4 record and were led by Andy Gustafson in his second season as head coach.

== Game summaries ==
=== Roanoke ===
Roanoke vs. VPI

Team	1	2	3	4	Total
Roanoke	0	0	0	7	7
• VPI	7	20	0	7	34

- Date: September 29, 1928
- Location: Miles Stadium
  Blacksburg, VA
- Referee: Paul Magoffin

VPI's first game of the season was a victory over Roanoke at Miles Stadium.

The starting lineup for VPI was: Gray (left end), Ritter (left tackle), Hotchkiss (left guard), Price (center), Dexter Hubbard (right guard), Bailey (right tackle), Mahaney (right end), Hooper (quarterback), Mattox (left halfback), Peake (right halfback), Looney (fullback). The substitutes were: Amole, Baker, Brown, Coffee, Green, Maury Hubbard, MacArthur, Owens, Pattie, Rule, Shafer, Harry Spear, Phil Spear and Wimmer.

The starting lineup for Roanoke was: Ed I. Bell (left end), Lloyd "Buzzy" Goode (left tackle), D. C. Lionberger (left guard), Harold Nank (center), Beare (right guard), Thomas Fryer (right tackle), Stanley Rutherford (right end), J. H. "Deana" Gilbert (quarterback), Billy O. Williams (left halfback), Pleas Ramsey (right halfback), J. "Dutch" Dietrich (fullback). The substitutes were: William Altizer, Roy Boyle, W. T. "Ted" Fix and Lewis Lionberger.

=== Hampden–Sydney ===
Hampden–Sydney vs. VPI

Team	1	2	3	4	Total
HS	0	7	0	0	7
• VPI	7	6	12	7	32

- Date: October 6, 1928
- Location: Miles Stadium
  Blacksburg, VA
- Referee: Parrish (VPI)

After their victory over Roanoke, VPI played Hampden–Sydney College at Miles Stadium.

The starting lineup for VPI was: Gray (left end), Bailey (left tackle), Hotchkiss (left guard), Price (center), Dexter Hubbard (right guard), Ritter (right tackle), Mahaney (right end), Hooper (quarterback), Mattox (left halfback), Peake (right halfback), Owens (fullback). The substitutes were: Amole, Brown, Green, Jones, Maury Hubbard, MacArthur, Pattie, Rule and Spear.

The starting lineup for Hampden–Sydney was: Ellis Allen (left end), Henry McLaughlin (left tackle), Charles Jett (left guard), John Hunt (center), Hugh Blanton (right guard), Hughes Reverley (right tackle), Stuart Worden (right end), Robert Lawson (quarterback), Ralph Willis (left halfback), Thomas Peach (right halfback), John Montgomery (fullback). The substitutes were: Carl Arehart, S. B. Carter, Charles Gatewood, Henry Harris, William Jefferson, Cecil Jones, Wellford Reed and George Woodworth.

=== Colgate ===
VPI at Colgate

Team	1	2	3	4	Total
VPI	0	7	7	0	14
• Colgate	0	6	22	7	35

- Date: October 13, 1928
- Location: Whitnall Field
  Hamilton, NY
- Game attendance: 3,000
- Game weather: "inclement weather"
- Referee: E. F. Houghitt (Michigan)

The starting lineup for VPI was: Gray (left end), Bailey (left tackle), Hotchkiss (left guard), Brown (center), Dexter Hubbard (right guard), Ritter (right tackle), Pattie (right end), Hooper (quarterback), Mattox (left halfback), Peake (right halfback), Owens (fullback). The substitutes were: Maury Hubbard, Jones, Looney, MacArthur, Mahaney, Rule and Spear.

The starting lineup for Colgate was: Mike Stramiello (left end), Arthur Huntington (left tackle), Bob Gillson (left guard), John Cox (center), Bruce DuMont (right guard), Ralph Lockwood (right tackle), Frank Abruzzino (right end), Izzy Yablok (quarterback), Thomas Dowler (left halfback), John Galloway (right halfback), Edward Herb (fullback). The substitutes were: Joseph Barclay, Thatcher Cottrell, Thomas Doyle, Joseph Franklin, Richard Gasper, Hoot Haines, Leslie Hart, Leonard Macaluso and Salvatore Maggio.

=== North Carolina ===
VPI at North Carolina

Team	1	2	3	4	Total
• VPI	3	0	6	7	16
UNC	0	7	7	0	14

- Date: October 20, 1928
- Location: Kenan Memorial Stadium
  Chapel Hill, NC
- Game attendance: 9,000
- Referee: Richard Carrington (UVA)

The starting lineup for VPI was: Mahaney (left end), Bailey (left tackle), Hotchkiss (left guard), Brown (center), Dexter Hubbard (right guard), Ritter (right tackle), Gray (right end), Hooper (quarterback), Peake (left halfback), Phil Spears (right halfback), Looney (fullback).

The starting lineup for North Carolina was: O'Dell Sapp (left end), Nelson Howard (left tackle), Ray Farris (left guard), Harry Schwartz (center), Bud Shuler (right guard), M. E. Donahoe (right tackle), Samuel Presson (right end), Albert Whisnant (quarterback), James Ward (left halfback), Leon Spaulding (right halfback), Edison Foard (fullback). The substitutes were: J. Thomas Greshham, J. E. Magner, Maus, E. Strudwick Nash and Charles Wyrick.

=== King ===
King vs. VPI

Team	1	2	3	4	Total
King	0	0	0	0	0
• VPI	20	13	21	0	54

- Date: October 27, 1928
- Location: Miles Stadium
  Blacksburg, VA
- Referee: Parrish (VPI)

Virginia Tech halfback Eugene Rule fractured his collarbone during the game and did not play the remainder of the season.

The starting lineup for VPI was: Ray (left end), Green (left tackle), Jones (left guard), Price (center), Maury Hubbard (right guard), S. Spear (right tackle), Mahaney (right end), MacArthur (quarterback), Mattox (left halfback), Rule (right halfback), Owens (fullback).

The starting lineup for King was: Bowman (left end), Dommer (left tackle), Woodman (left guard), Schwartz (center), P. Davis (right guard), Backus (right tackle), Townley (right end), Johnson (quarterback), Laughlin (left halfback), Trimble (right halfback), Simms (fullback).

=== Maryland ===
Maryland vs. VPI

Team	1	2	3	4	Total
Maryland	0	6	0	0	6
• VPI	9	0	0	0	9

- Date: November 3, 1928
- Location: League Park
  Norfolk, VA
- Game start: 2:30 p.m.
- Game attendance: 6,000+
- Game weather: "Leaden skies"
- Referee: Witt (VMI)

The starting lineup for VPI was: Gray (left end), Bailey (left tackle), Hotchkiss (left guard), Brown (center), Dexter Hubbard (right guard), Ritter (right tackle), Mahaney (right end), Hooper (quarterback), Peake (left halfback), Phil Spear (right halfback), Looney (fullback). The substitutes were: Davis, Maury Hubbard, Jones, MacArthur and Owens.

The starting lineup for Maryland was: Charles Dodson (left end), William Fisher (left tackle), Arthur Wondrack (left guard), George Madigan (center), Omar D. Crothers Jr. (right guard), John McDonald (right tackle), Herman Lombard (right end), Blackistone (quarterback), Roberts (left halfback), John Parsons (right halfback), Gerald Snyder (fullback). The substitutes were: Dix, William W. Evans, William Heintz, Gordon Kessler, Julius J. Radice and Warcholy.

=== Virginia ===
Virginia vs. VPI

Team	1	2	3	4	Total
UVA	0	0	0	0	0
• VPI	7	7	6	0	20

- Date: November 10, 1928
- Location: Miles Stadium
  Blacksburg, VA
- Game attendance: 5,000–7,000
- Game weather: "driving snow"
- Referee: Branch Bocock

The starting lineup for VPI was: Gray (left end), Bailey (left tackle), Hotchkiss (left guard), Brown (center), Dexter Hubbard (right guard), Ritter (right tackle), Mahaney (right end), Hooper (quarterback), Phil Spear (left halfback), Mattox (right halfback), Owens (fullback). The substitutes were: Peake.

The starting lineup for Virginia was: Harry Flippen (left end), William Luke (left tackle), Harris (left guard), George Taylor (center), Vernon Austin (right guard), Richard DeButts (right tackle), Howard Turner (right end), John Sloan (quarterback), Gus Kaminer (left halfback), Albert Lewy (right halfback), Bledsoe Pinkerton (fullback). The substitutes were: William Paxton.

=== Washington and Lee ===
VPI at Washington and Lee

Team	1	2	3	4	Total
• VPI	0	6	0	7	13
W&L	0	0	7	0	7

- Date: November 17, 1928
- Location: Wilson Field
  Lexington, VA
- Game start: 2:00 p.m.
- Game attendance: 5,000
- Game weather: "Indian summer afternoon"
- Referee: Richard Carrington (UVA)

The starting lineup for VPI was: Gray (left end), Bailey (left tackle), Hotchkiss (left guard), Brown (center), Dexter Hubbard (right guard), Ritter (right tackle), Mahaney (right end), Hooper (quarterback), Mattox (left halfback), Peake (right halfback), Owens (fullback).

The starting lineup for Washington and Lee was: Charles Day (left end), Earl Fitzpatrick (left tackle), Thomas Taylor (left guard), Howell Snodgrass (center), Henry Groop (right guard), William Hawkins (right tackle), Mason Sproul (right end), William Lott (quarterback), John Faulkner (left halfback), Morton Thibodeau (right halfback), Eugene White (fullback). The substitutes were: David Eberhart, John Jacob, Albert Jones and Myer Seligman.

=== VMI ===
VMI vs. VPI

Team	1	2	3	4	Total
• VMI	0	7	9	0	16
VPI	0	6	0	0	6

- Date: November 29, 1928
- Location: Maher Field
  Roanoke, VA
- Game attendance: 20,000
- Referee: Ed Thorpe (De LaSalle)

The starting lineup for VPI was: Gray (left end), Bailey (left tackle), Hotchkiss (left guard), Brown (center), Dexter Hubbard (right guard), Ritter (right tackle), Mahaney (right end), Hooper (quarterback), Mattox (left halfback), Peake (right halfback), Owens (fullback). The substitutes were: Amole, Maury Hubbard, Looney, Rule, Harry Spear and Phil Spear.

The starting lineup for VMI was: William Moss (left end), Aubrey Grow (left tackle), Louis Chadwick (left guard), Virgil Grow (center), Philip Willard (right guard), Luther Hewlett (right tackle), Tommy Scott (right end), Albert Hawkins (quarterback), Albert Barnes (left halfback), Frank Harner (right halfback), McCray (fullback). The substitutes were: Roy Dunn, William Haase, Ernest Laughorn, Joel Moody, James Smith and Gordon Walker.

== Players ==
=== Roster ===
VPI 1928 roster
Roger Lee Amole; Albert Bailey (Capt.); Baker; Joseph Brown; James A. Coffey; William Grundy Davis; John Gray; John Buckner Green; Bird Hooper; Philip Hotchkiss; Dexter Hubbard; Maury Hubbard; William Hudgins; Warner Brooke Jones; John Looney	Scotty MacArthur; Arthur Mahaney; Cloy Mattox; Lloyd Nutter (Capt.); Milton Owens; Walter Pattie; Frank Peake; Nelson Osborn Price; Marcus Ritter; Eugene Rule; Shafer; Harry Bingham Spear; Philip Spear; Tommy Tomko; Harold J. Wimmer

=== Monogram Club members ===
Nineteen players received monograms for their participation on the 1928 VPI team.

Player	Hometown	Notes
Albert Ewell Bailey (Capt.)	Roanoke, Virginia	
Joseph Murray Brown	Staunton, Virginia	
John Edward Gray	Newport News, Virginia	
Henry Virgil "Bird" Hooper	Newport News, Virginia	
Philip Smith Hotchkiss		
Louis Dexter Hubbard	Forest, Virginia	World War II veteran (Lieutenant Colonel, Army).
William Coles Hudgins	Norfolk, Virginia	
John Ote Looney	Roanoke, Virginia	
James Bushell "Scotty" MacArthur	Newport News, Virginia	Born in Greenock, Scotland.
Arthur Randolph Mahaney		
Cloy Mattox	Leesville, Virginia	Major League Baseball catcher for the Philadelphia Athletics during the 1929 season.
Lloyd Broderick Nutter (Capt.)	Blacksburg, Virginia	World War II veteran (Captain, Army).
Milton Anthony Owens	Portsmouth, Virginia	
Walter Wilson Pattie	Waynesboro, Virginia	
Frank Peake	Hampton, Virginia	
Marcus Oliver Ritter	Winchester, Virginia	
Eugene Butler Rule	Jodie, West Virginia	
Philip Hitchborn Spear	Portsmouth, Virginia	
Cyril Method "Tommy" Tomko	Disputanta, Virginia	
