= 1928 North Carolina Tar Heels football team =

American college football season

1928 North Carolina Tar Heels football
- Conference: Southern Conference
- Record: 5–3–2 (2–2–2 SoCon)
- Head coach: Chuck Collins (3rd season)
- Captain: Harry Schwartz
- Home stadium: Kenan Memorial Stadium

1928 Southern Conference football standings
	Conf.					Overall
Team	W		L		T	W		L		T
No. 3 Georgia Tech $	7	–	0	–	0	10	–	0	–	0
Tennessee	6	–	0	–	1	9	–	0	–	1
Florida	6	–	1	–	0	8	–	1	–	0
VPI	4	–	1	–	0	7	–	2	–	0
Alabama	6	–	2	–	0	6	–	3	–	0
LSU	3	–	1	–	1	6	–	2	–	1
Clemson	4	–	2	–	0	8	–	3	–	0
Vanderbilt	4	–	2	–	0	8	–	2	–	0
Tulane	3	–	3	–	1	6	–	3	–	1
Ole Miss	3	–	3	–	0	5	–	4	–	0
North Carolina	2	–	2	–	2	5	–	3	–	2
Kentucky	2	–	2	–	1	4	–	3	–	1
South Carolina	2	–	2	–	1	6	–	2	–	2
Maryland	2	–	3	–	1	6	–	3	–	1
VMI	2	–	3	–	1	5	–	3	–	2
Georgia	2	–	4	–	0	4	–	5	–	0
NC State	1	–	3	–	1	4	–	5	–	1
Mississippi A&M	1	–	4	–	0	2	–	4	–	2
Virginia	1	–	6	–	0	2	–	6	–	1
Washington and Lee	1	–	6	–	0	2	–	8	–	0
Sewanee	0	–	5	–	0	2	–	7	–	0
Auburn	0	–	7	–	0	1	–	8	–	0
$ – Conference champion; Rankings from Dickinson System

The 1928 North Carolina Tar Heels football team represented the University of North Carolina (now known as the University of North Carolina at Chapel Hill) during the 1928 college football season as a member of the Southern Conference (SoCon). The Tar Heels were led by head coach Chuck Collins in his third season and finished with a record of five wins, three losses, and two ties (5–3–2 overall, 2–2–2 in the SoCon).

== Schedule ==
Date	Time	Opponent	Site	Result	Attendance	Source
September 29	3:00 p.m.	Wake Forest*	Kenan Memorial Stadium; Chapel Hill, NC (rivalry)	W 65–0	15,000	
October 6	2:30 p.m.	at Maryland	Byrd Stadium; College Park, MD	W 26–19		
October 13	2:30 p.m.	at Harvard*	Harvard Stadium; Boston, MA	L 0–20		
October 20	3:00 p.m.	VPI	Kenan Memorial Stadium; Chapel Hill, NC	L 14–16	9,000	
October 27	2:30 p.m.	Georgia Tech	Kenan Memorial Stadium; Chapel Hill, NC	L 7–20	20,000	
November 3	2:30 p.m.	at NC State	Riddick Field; Raleigh, NC (rivalry)	T 6–6	10,000	
November 10	2:30 p.m.	South Carolina	Kenan Memorial Stadium; Chapel Hill, NC (rivalry)	T 0–0		
November 17	2:30 p.m.	at Davidson*	Richardson Stadium; Davidson, NC	W 30–7	7,000	
November 29	2:30 p.m.	at Virginia	Lambeth Field; Charlottesville, VA (rivalry)	W 24–20	18,000-20,000	
December 8	2:00 p.m.	Duke*	Kenan Memorial Stadium; Chapel Hill, NC (rivalry)	W 14–7	10,000	
*Non-conference game; All times are in Eastern time
