= 1928 Washington and Lee Generals football team =

American college football season

1928 Washington and Lee Generals football
- Conference: Southern Conference
- Record: 2–8 (1–6 SoCon)
- Head coach: James P. Herron (3rd season)
- Captain: Earl Fitzpatrick
- Home stadium: Wilson Field

1928 Southern Conference football standings
| | Conf. | | | | | Overall |
| Team | W | | L | | T | W | | L | | T |
|---|---|---|---|---|---|---|---|---|---|---|
| No. 3 Georgia Tech $ | 7 | – | 0 | – | 0 | 10 | – | 0 | – | 0 |
| Tennessee | 6 | – | 0 | – | 1 | 9 | – | 0 | – | 1 |
| Florida | 6 | – | 1 | – | 0 | 8 | – | 1 | – | 0 |
| VPI | 4 | – | 1 | – | 0 | 7 | – | 2 | – | 0 |
| Alabama | 6 | – | 2 | – | 0 | 6 | – | 3 | – | 0 |
| LSU | 3 | – | 1 | – | 1 | 6 | – | 2 | – | 1 |
| Clemson | 4 | – | 2 | – | 0 | 8 | – | 3 | – | 0 |
| Vanderbilt | 4 | – | 2 | – | 0 | 8 | – | 2 | – | 0 |
| Tulane | 3 | – | 3 | – | 1 | 6 | – | 3 | – | 1 |
| Ole Miss | 3 | – | 3 | – | 0 | 5 | – | 4 | – | 0 |
| North Carolina | 2 | – | 2 | – | 2 | 5 | – | 3 | – | 2 |
| Kentucky | 2 | – | 2 | – | 1 | 4 | – | 3 | – | 1 |
| South Carolina | 2 | – | 2 | – | 1 | 6 | – | 2 | – | 2 |
| Maryland | 2 | – | 3 | – | 1 | 6 | – | 3 | – | 1 |
| VMI | 2 | – | 3 | – | 1 | 5 | – | 3 | – | 2 |
| Georgia | 2 | – | 4 | – | 0 | 4 | – | 5 | – | 0 |
| NC State | 1 | – | 3 | – | 1 | 4 | – | 5 | – | 1 |
| Mississippi A&M | 1 | – | 4 | – | 0 | 2 | – | 4 | – | 2 |
| Virginia | 1 | – | 6 | – | 0 | 2 | – | 6 | – | 1 |
| Washington and Lee | 1 | – | 6 | – | 0 | 2 | – | 8 | – | 0 |
| Sewanee | 0 | – | 5 | – | 0 | 2 | – | 7 | – | 0 |
| Auburn | 0 | – | 7 | – | 0 | 1 | – | 8 | – | 0 |
$ – Conference champion; Rankings from Dickinson System

The 1928 Washington and Lee Generals football team was an American football team that represented Washington and Lee University as a member of the Southern Conference (SoCon) during the 1928 college football season. In their third season under head coach James P. Herron, Washington and Lee compiled a 2–8 record.

== Schedule ==
| Date | Opponent | Site | Result | Source |
|---|---|---|---|---|
| September 29 | Lynchburg* | Wilson Field; Lexington, VA | W 56–0 | |
| October 6 | NC State | Wilson Field; Lexington, VA | W 38–6 | |
| October 13 | at Kentucky | Stoll Field; Lexington, KY | L 0–6 | |
| October 20 | vs. West Virginia* | Laidley Field; Charleston, WV | L 0–22 | |
| October 27 | at Tennessee | Shields–Watkins Field; Knoxville, TN | L 6–27 | |
| November 3 | at Virginia | Lambeth Field; Charlottesville, VA | L 13–20 | |
| November 10 | at Princeton* | Palmer Stadium; Princeton, NJ | L 12–25 | |
| November 17 | VPI | Wilson Field; Lexington, VA | L 7–13 | |
| November 24 | vs. Maryland | Griffith Stadium; Washington, DC | L 0–6 | |
| November 29 | at Florida | Fairfield Stadium; Jacksonville, FL | L 6–60 | |
*Non-conference game
