= 1928 South Carolina Gamecocks football team =

American college football season

1928 South Carolina Gamecocks football
- Conference: Southern Conference
- Record: 6–2–2 (2–2–1 SoCon)
- Head coach: Billy Laval (1st season)
- Captain: Bill Cooper
- Home stadium: Melton Field

1928 Southern Conference football standings
	Conf.					Overall
Team	W		L		T	W		L		T
No. 3 Georgia Tech $	7	–	0	–	0	10	–	0	–	0
Tennessee	6	–	0	–	1	9	–	0	–	1
Florida	6	–	1	–	0	8	–	1	–	0
VPI	4	–	1	–	0	7	–	2	–	0
Alabama	6	–	2	–	0	6	–	3	–	0
LSU	3	–	1	–	1	6	–	2	–	1
Clemson	4	–	2	–	0	8	–	3	–	0
Vanderbilt	4	–	2	–	0	8	–	2	–	0
Tulane	3	–	3	–	1	6	–	3	–	1
Ole Miss	3	–	3	–	0	5	–	4	–	0
North Carolina	2	–	2	–	2	5	–	3	–	2
Kentucky	2	–	2	–	1	4	–	3	–	1
South Carolina	2	–	2	–	1	6	–	2	–	2
Maryland	2	–	3	–	1	6	–	3	–	1
VMI	2	–	3	–	1	5	–	3	–	2
Georgia	2	–	4	–	0	4	–	5	–	0
NC State	1	–	3	–	1	4	–	5	–	1
Mississippi A&M	1	–	4	–	0	2	–	4	–	2
Virginia	1	–	6	–	0	2	–	6	–	1
Washington and Lee	1	–	6	–	0	2	–	8	–	0
Sewanee	0	–	5	–	0	2	–	7	–	0
Auburn	0	–	7	–	0	1	–	8	–	0
$ – Conference champion; Rankings from Dickinson System

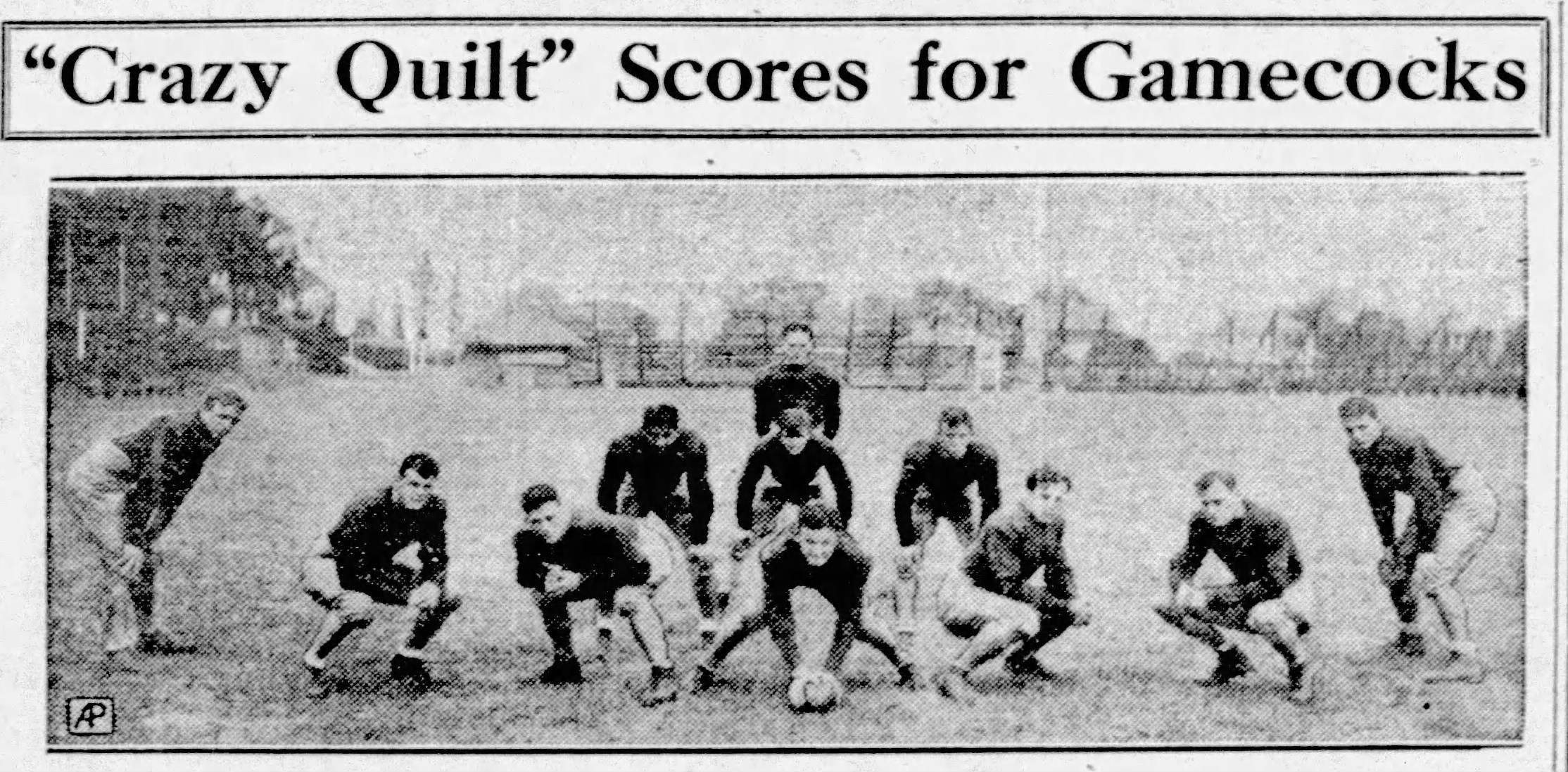
South Carolina, lifted to national recognition by its victory over Chicago in the opening game of the season, and the later triumph over Virginia by an impressive margin, is shown here in their "crazy quilt" battle formation

The 1928 South Carolina Gamecocks football team was an American football team that represented the University of South Carolina as a member of the Southern Conference (SoCon) during the 1928 college football season. Led by first-year head coach Billy Laval, the Gamecocks compiled an overall record of 6–2–2 with a mark of 2–2–1 in conference play, placing 15th in the SoCon.

== Schedule ==
Date	Opponent	Site	Result	Attendance	Source
September 22	Erskine*	Melton Field; Columbia, SC	W 19–0	4,000	
September 29	at Chicago*	Stagg Field; Chicago, IL	W 6–0	35,000	
October 6	at Virginia	Lambeth Field; Charlottesville, VA	W 24–13	7,500	
October 13	Maryland	Melton Field; Columbia, SC	W 21–7		
October 19	Presbyterian*	Melton Field; Columbia, SC	W 13–0		
October 25	Clemson	State Fairgrounds; Columbia, SC (rivalry)	L 0–32	14,000	
November 1	vs. The Citadel*	County Fairgrounds; Orangeburg, SC	T 0–0	2,000	
November 10	at North Carolina	Kenan Memorial Stadium; Chapel Hill, NC (rivalry)	T 0–0	6,000	
November 17	Furman*	Melton Field; Columbia, SC	W 6–0		
November 29	at NC State	Riddick Stadium; Raleigh, NC	L 7–18		
*Non-conference game
