= 1928 Virginia Cavaliers football team =

American college football season

1928 Virginia Cavaliers football
- Conference: Southern Conference
- Record: 2–6–1 (1–6 SoCon)
- Head coach: Greasy Neale (6th season)
- Captain: Bill Luke
- Home stadium: Lambeth Field

1928 Southern Conference football standings
	Conf.					Overall
Team	W		L		T	W		L		T
No. 3 Georgia Tech $	7	–	0	–	0	10	–	0	–	0
Tennessee	6	–	0	–	1	9	–	0	–	1
Florida	6	–	1	–	0	8	–	1	–	0
VPI	4	–	1	–	0	7	–	2	–	0
Alabama	6	–	2	–	0	6	–	3	–	0
LSU	3	–	1	–	1	6	–	2	–	1
Clemson	4	–	2	–	0	8	–	3	–	0
Vanderbilt	4	–	2	–	0	8	–	2	–	0
Tulane	3	–	3	–	1	6	–	3	–	1
Ole Miss	3	–	3	–	0	5	–	4	–	0
North Carolina	2	–	2	–	2	5	–	3	–	2
Kentucky	2	–	2	–	1	4	–	3	–	1
South Carolina	2	–	2	–	1	6	–	2	–	2
Maryland	2	–	3	–	1	6	–	3	–	1
VMI	2	–	3	–	1	5	–	3	–	2
Georgia	2	–	4	–	0	4	–	5	–	0
NC State	1	–	3	–	1	4	–	5	–	1
Mississippi A&M	1	–	4	–	0	2	–	4	–	2
Virginia	1	–	6	–	0	2	–	6	–	1
Washington and Lee	1	–	6	–	0	2	–	8	–	0
Sewanee	0	–	5	–	0	2	–	7	–	0
Auburn	0	–	7	–	0	1	–	8	–	0
$ – Conference champion; Rankings from Dickinson System

The 1928 Virginia Cavaliers football team represented the University of Virginia as a member of the Southern Conference (SoCon) during the 1928 college football season. Led by Greasy Neale in his sixth and final season as head coach, the Cavaliers compiled an overall record of 2–6–1 with a mark of 1–6 in conference play, tying for 20th place in the SoCon. The team played its games at Lambeth Field in Charlottesville, Virginia.

== Schedule ==
Date	Opponent	Site	Result	Attendance	Source
September 29	Randolph–Macon*	Lambeth Field; Charlottesville, VA	W 66–0		
October 6	South Carolina	Lambeth Field; Charlottesville, VA	L 13–24	7,500	
October 13	at Princeton*	Palmer Stadium; Princeton, NJ	T 0–0		
October 20	at VMI	Alumni Field; Lexington, VA	L 0–9		
October 27	at Vanderbilt	Dudley Stadium; Nashville, TN	L 0–34		
November 3	Washington and Lee^{†}	Lambeth Field; Charlottesville, VA	W 20–13		
November 10	at VPI	Miles Stadium; Blacksburg, VA (rivalry)	L 0–20	5,000–7,000	
November 17	at Maryland	Byrd Stadium; College Park, MD (rivalry)	L 2–18		
November 29	North Carolina	Lambeth Field; Charlottesville, VA (rivalry)	L 20–24	18,000-20,000	
*Non-conference game; ^{†}Homecoming
