= 1928 LSU Tigers football team =

American college football season

1928 LSU Tigers football
- Conference: Southern Conference
- Record: 6–2–1 (3–1–1 SoCon)
- Head coach: Russ Cohen (1st season)
- MVP: Hank Stovall
- Captain: Jess Tinsley
- Home stadium: Tiger Stadium

1928 Southern Conference football standings
	Conf.					Overall
Team	W		L		T	W		L		T
No. 3 Georgia Tech $	7	–	0	–	0	10	–	0	–	0
Tennessee	6	–	0	–	1	9	–	0	–	1
Florida	6	–	1	–	0	8	–	1	–	0
VPI	4	–	1	–	0	7	–	2	–	0
Alabama	6	–	2	–	0	6	–	3	–	0
LSU	3	–	1	–	1	6	–	2	–	1
Clemson	4	–	2	–	0	8	–	3	–	0
Vanderbilt	4	–	2	–	0	8	–	2	–	0
Tulane	3	–	3	–	1	6	–	3	–	1
Ole Miss	3	–	3	–	0	5	–	4	–	0
North Carolina	2	–	2	–	2	5	–	3	–	2
Kentucky	2	–	2	–	1	4	–	3	–	1
South Carolina	2	–	2	–	1	6	–	2	–	2
Maryland	2	–	3	–	1	6	–	3	–	1
VMI	2	–	3	–	1	5	–	3	–	2
Georgia	2	–	4	–	0	4	–	5	–	0
NC State	1	–	3	–	1	4	–	5	–	1
Mississippi A&M	1	–	4	–	0	2	–	4	–	2
Virginia	1	–	6	–	0	2	–	6	–	1
Washington and Lee	1	–	6	–	0	2	–	8	–	0
Sewanee	0	–	5	–	0	2	–	7	–	0
Auburn	0	–	7	–	0	1	–	8	–	0
$ – Conference champion; Rankings from Dickinson System

The 1928 LSU Tigers football team was an American football team that represented Louisiana State University (LSU) as a member of the Southern Conference during the 1928 college football season. In their first season under head coach Russ Cohen, LSU compiled a 6–2–1 record.

Jess Tinsley was named first team All-Southern for the second year in a row, playing weak side tackle. First year coach Russ Cohen, himself a former All-Southern end at Vanderbilt, claimed that Tinsley was "the finest tackle he had ever seen.

== Schedule ==
Date	Opponent	Site	Result	Attendance	Source
October 6	Southwestern Louisiana*	Tiger Stadium; Baton Rouge, LA	W 46–0		
October 12	Louisiana College*	Tiger Stadium; Baton Rouge, LA	W 41–0		
October 20	at Mississippi A&M	Municipal Stadium; Jackson, MS (rivalry)	W 31–0		
October 27	Spring Hill*	Tiger Stadium; Baton Rouge, LA	W 30–7		
November 3	vs. Arkansas*	State Fair Stadium; Shreveport, LA (rivalry)	L 7–0		
November 10	Ole Miss^{†}	Tiger Stadium; Baton Rouge, LA (rivalry)	W 19–6		
November 17	at Georgia	Sanford Field; Athens, GA	W 13–12		
November 29	at Tulane	Tulane Stadium; New Orleans, LA (Battle for the Rag)	T 0–0		
December 8	at Alabama	Legion Field; Birmingham, AL (rivalry)	L 13–0	12,000	
*Non-conference game; ^{†}Homecoming
