= 1928 VMI Keydets football team =

American college football season

1928 VMI Keydets football
- Conference: Southern Conference
- Record: 5–3–2 (2–3–1 SoCon)
- Head coach: W. C. Raftery (2nd season)
- Home stadium: Alumni Field

1928 Southern Conference football standings
	Conf.					Overall
Team	W		L		T	W		L		T
No. 3 Georgia Tech $	7	–	0	–	0	10	–	0	–	0
Tennessee	6	–	0	–	1	9	–	0	–	1
Florida	6	–	1	–	0	8	–	1	–	0
VPI	4	–	1	–	0	7	–	2	–	0
Alabama	6	–	2	–	0	6	–	3	–	0
LSU	3	–	1	–	1	6	–	2	–	1
Clemson	4	–	2	–	0	8	–	3	–	0
Vanderbilt	4	–	2	–	0	8	–	2	–	0
Tulane	3	–	3	–	1	6	–	3	–	1
Ole Miss	3	–	3	–	0	5	–	4	–	0
North Carolina	2	–	2	–	2	5	–	3	–	2
Kentucky	2	–	2	–	1	4	–	3	–	1
South Carolina	2	–	2	–	1	6	–	2	–	2
Maryland	2	–	3	–	1	6	–	3	–	1
VMI	2	–	3	–	1	5	–	3	–	2
Georgia	2	–	4	–	0	4	–	5	–	0
NC State	1	–	3	–	1	4	–	5	–	1
Mississippi A&M	1	–	4	–	0	2	–	4	–	2
Virginia	1	–	6	–	0	2	–	6	–	1
Washington and Lee	1	–	6	–	0	2	–	8	–	0
Sewanee	0	–	5	–	0	2	–	7	–	0
Auburn	0	–	7	–	0	1	–	8	–	0
$ – Conference champion; Rankings from Dickinson System

The 1928 VMI Keydets football team was an American football team that represented the Virginia Military Institute (VMI) during the 1928 college football season as a member of the Southern Conference. In their second year under head coach W. C. Raftery, the team compiled an overall record of 5–3–2.

== Schedule ==
Date	Opponent	Site	Result	Source
September 22	Hampden–Sydney*	Alumni Field; Lexington, VA	W 14–7	
September 29	Richmond*	Alumni Field; Lexington, VA (rivalry)	T 6–6	
October 6	at Georgia Tech	Grant Field; Atlanta, GA	L 0–13	
October 13	Roanoke*	Alumni Field; Lexington, VA	W 31–13	
October 20	Virginia	Alumni Field; Lexington, VA	W 9–0	
October 27	vs. Maryland	Tate Field; Richmond, VA	T 0–0	
November 3	Davidson*	Alumni Field; Lexington, VA	W 13–0	
November 10	vs. Clemson	Lynchburg, VA	L 0–12	
November 17	at Kentucky	McLean Stadium; Lexington, KY	L 6–18	
November 29	vs. VPI	Maher Field; Roanoke, VA (rivalry)	W 16-6	
*Non-conference game
