= O. K. Pressley =

American football player, coach, and lieutenant colonel (1907–1984)

Biographical details
- Born: June 24, 1907; Lowrys, South Carolina, U.S.
- Died: September 22, 1984 (aged 77); Chester, South Carolina, U.S.

Playing career
- 1926–1928: Clemson
- Position: Center

Coaching career (HC unless noted)
- 1934: Quantico Marines

Accomplishments and honors

Awards
- Third-team All-American (1928); All-Southern (1928); Clemson Athletic Hall of Fame

Orin Kirkpatrick Pressley (June 24, 1907 – September 22, 1984) was an American college football player and coach and a lieutenant colonel in the United States Marine Corps.

== Early years ==
Pressley was born on June 24, 1907, to Thomas Jefferson Pressley and Cornelia Kirkpatrick, in Lowrys, a small town in Chester County, South Carolina.

== Clemson College ==
Pressley was a prominent center for the Clemson Tigers of Clemson College from 1926 to 1928. He majored in animal husbandry. Pressley was inducted into the Clemson Athletic Hall of Fame in 1978. Pressley was the school's first All-American, when he received third-team honors from Walter Trumbull, John Heisman, and the Newspaper Enterprise Association. He made first-team All-Southern. Pressley once commented on the uniforms in the 1920s: "We wore patches on patches but they were good times. We often tossed those leather skullcap-type helmets to the sidelines sand played without. One player shunned any pads or protective equipment because it slowed him down." Clemson wore orange jerseys for the first time in 1928, and Pressley starred in the rivalry game with South Carolina, recording four tackles for a loss in a row despite a hand injury. “A better center than Captain O.K. Pressley of Clemson is hard to find,” remarked former South Carolina head coach Billy Laval.

== Marine Corps ==
On October 1, 1930, The Tiger published the following account: "Phila. PA. - September 30 - Lt. O.K. Pressley, former Clemson College gridder, is one of the All-Marine team located here, which is scheduled to play a number of college teams this year. The team is composed of selected players from the entire Marine Corps, and is considered one of the best service elevens in the country. This is Pressley's first year in the Marines."

== Teacher ==
After his military retirement, he taught school in South Carolina and at Chester Junior High School.
