= 1928 Mississippi A&M Aggies football team =

American college football season

1928 Mississippi A&M Aggies football
- Conference: Southern Conference
- Record: 2–4–2 (1–4 SoCon)
- Head coach: John W. Hancock (2nd season)
- Home stadium: Scott Field; Municipal Stadium

1928 Southern Conference football standings
	Conf.					Overall
Team	W		L		T	W		L		T
No. 3 Georgia Tech $	7	–	0	–	0	10	–	0	–	0
Tennessee	6	–	0	–	1	9	–	0	–	1
Florida	6	–	1	–	0	8	–	1	–	0
VPI	4	–	1	–	0	7	–	2	–	0
Alabama	6	–	2	–	0	6	–	3	–	0
LSU	3	–	1	–	1	6	–	2	–	1
Clemson	4	–	2	–	0	8	–	3	–	0
Vanderbilt	4	–	2	–	0	8	–	2	–	0
Tulane	3	–	3	–	1	6	–	3	–	1
Ole Miss	3	–	3	–	0	5	–	4	–	0
North Carolina	2	–	2	–	2	5	–	3	–	2
Kentucky	2	–	2	–	1	4	–	3	–	1
South Carolina	2	–	2	–	1	6	–	2	–	2
Maryland	2	–	3	–	1	6	–	3	–	1
VMI	2	–	3	–	1	5	–	3	–	2
Georgia	2	–	4	–	0	4	–	5	–	0
NC State	1	–	3	–	1	4	–	5	–	1
Mississippi A&M	1	–	4	–	0	2	–	4	–	2
Virginia	1	–	6	–	0	2	–	6	–	1
Washington and Lee	1	–	6	–	0	2	–	8	–	0
Sewanee	0	–	5	–	0	2	–	7	–	0
Auburn	0	–	7	–	0	1	–	8	–	0
$ – Conference champion; Rankings from Dickinson System

The 1928 Mississippi A&M Aggies football team was an American football team that represented the Agricultural and Mechanical College of the State of Mississippi (now known as Mississippi State University) as a member of the Southern Conference (SoCon) during the 1928 college football season. In their second season under head coach John W. Hancock, Mississippi A&M compiled a 2–4–2 record.

== Schedule ==
Date	Opponent	Site	Result	Attendance	Source
September 29	Ouachita Baptist*	Scott Field; Starkville, MS	W 20–6		
October 6	Tulane	Municipal Stadium; Jackson, MS	L 6–51		
October 13	Alabama	Scott Field; Starkville, MS (rivalry)	L 0–46	8,000	
October 20	LSU	Municipal Stadium; Jackson, MS (rivalry)	L 0–31		
November 3	at Michigan State*	College Field; East Lansing, MI	T 6–6		
November 10	Centenary*	Scott Field; Starkville, MS	T 6–6		
November 17	at Auburn	Legion Field; Birmingham, AL	W 13–0		
November 29	Ole Miss	Scott Field; Starkville, MS (Egg Bowl)	L 19–20		
*Non-conference game
