= 1928 NC State Wolfpack football team =

American college football season

1928 NC State Wolfpack football
- Conference: Southern Conference
- Record: 4–5–1 (1–4–1 SoCon)
- Head coach: Gus Tebell (4th season)
- Home stadium: Riddick Stadium

1928 Southern Conference football standings
	Conf.					Overall
Team	W		L		T	W		L		T
No. 3 Georgia Tech $	7	–	0	–	0	10	–	0	–	0
Tennessee	6	–	0	–	1	9	–	0	–	1
Florida	6	–	1	–	0	8	–	1	–	0
VPI	4	–	1	–	0	7	–	2	–	0
Alabama	6	–	2	–	0	6	–	3	–	0
LSU	3	–	1	–	1	6	–	2	–	1
Clemson	4	–	2	–	0	8	–	3	–	0
Vanderbilt	4	–	2	–	0	8	–	2	–	0
Tulane	3	–	3	–	1	6	–	3	–	1
Ole Miss	3	–	3	–	0	5	–	4	–	0
North Carolina	2	–	2	–	2	5	–	3	–	2
Kentucky	2	–	2	–	1	4	–	3	–	1
South Carolina	2	–	2	–	1	6	–	2	–	2
Maryland	2	–	3	–	1	6	–	3	–	1
VMI	2	–	3	–	1	5	–	3	–	2
Georgia	2	–	4	–	0	4	–	5	–	0
NC State	1	–	3	–	1	4	–	5	–	1
Mississippi A&M	1	–	4	–	0	2	–	4	–	2
Virginia	1	–	6	–	0	2	–	6	–	1
Washington and Lee	1	–	6	–	0	2	–	8	–	0
Sewanee	0	–	5	–	0	2	–	7	–	0
Auburn	0	–	7	–	0	1	–	8	–	0
$ – Conference champion; Rankings from Dickinson System

The 1928 NC State Wolfpack football team was an American football team that represented North Carolina State University as a member of the Southern Conference (SoCon) during the 1928 college football season. In its fifth and final season under head coach Gus Tebell, the team compiled a 4–5–1 record (1–4–1 against SoCon opponents), finished in 17th place in the conference, and outscored opponents by a total of 157 to 100.

== Schedule ==
Date	Opponent	Site	Result	Source
September 28	Elon*	Riddick Stadium; Raleigh, NC	W 57–0	
October 6	at Washington and Lee	Wilson Field; Lexington, VA	L 6–38	
October 12	at Clemson	Pee Dee Fairgrounds; Florence, SC (rivalry)	L 0–7	
October 18	Wake Forest*	Riddick Stadium; Raleigh, NC (rivalry)	W 37–0	
October 27	at Florida	Fairfield Stadium; Jacksonville, FL	L 7–14	
November 3	North Carolina	Riddick Stadium; Raleigh, NC (rivalry)	T 6–6	
November 10	vs. Davidson*	World War Memorial Stadium; Greensboro, NC	W 14–7	
November 17	Duke*	Riddick Stadium; Raleigh, NC (rivalry)	L 12–14	
November 24	at Michigan State*	College Field; East Lansing, MI	L 0–7	
November 29	South Carolina	Riddick Stadium; Raleigh, NC	W 18–7	
*Non-conference game
