= 1928 Clemson Tigers football team =

American college football season

1928 Clemson Tigers football
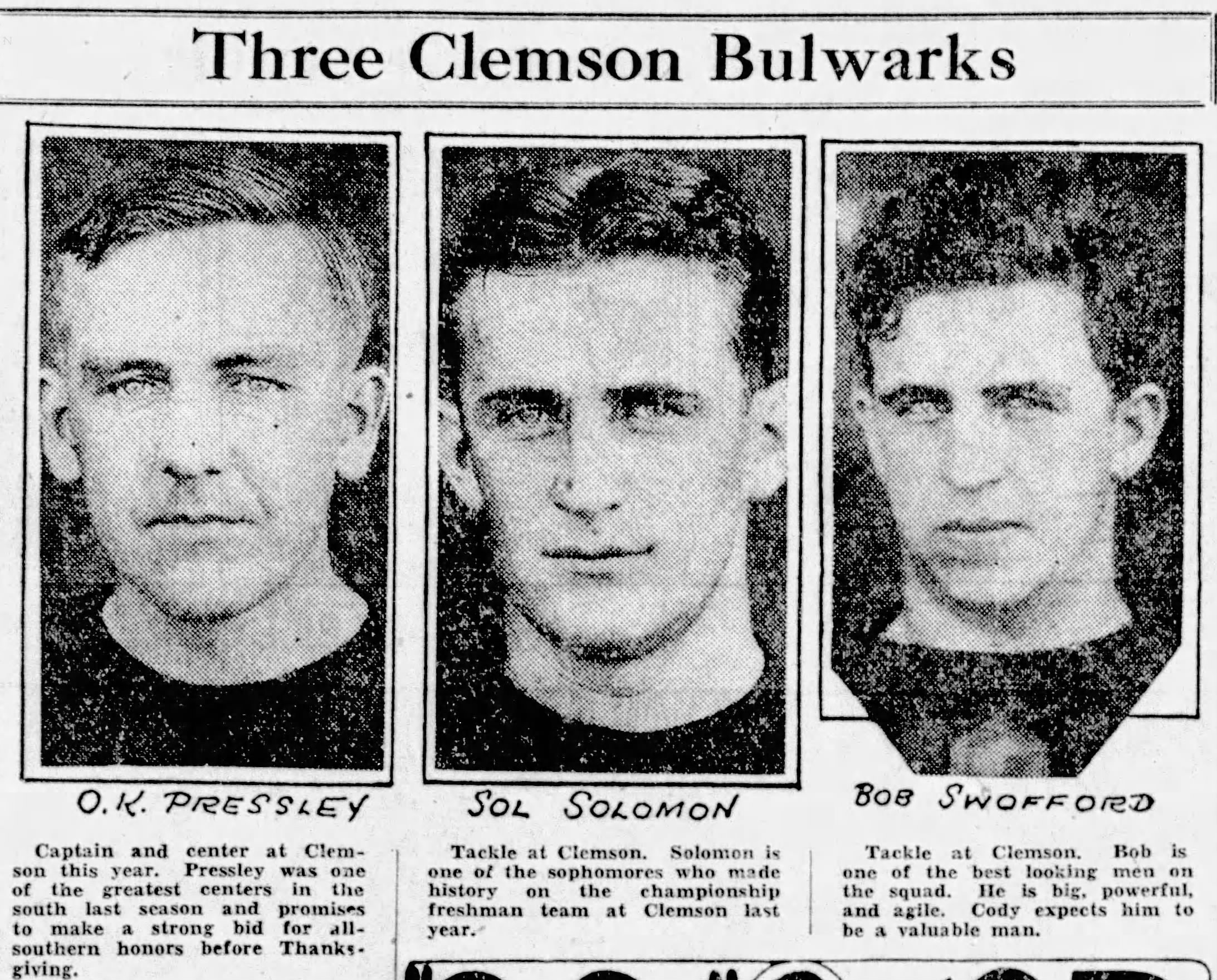
- Photographs of 1928 Clemson Tigers football team players O. K. Pressley, Sol Solomon, and Bob Swofford
- Conference: Southern Conference
- Record: 8–3 (4–2 SoCon)
- Head coach: Josh Cody (2nd season)
- Captain: O. K. Pressley
- Home stadium: Riggs Field

1928 Southern Conference football standings
	Conf.					Overall
Team	W		L		T	W		L		T
No. 3 Georgia Tech $	7	–	0	–	0	10	–	0	–	0
Tennessee	6	–	0	–	1	9	–	0	–	1
Florida	6	–	1	–	0	8	–	1	–	0
VPI	4	–	1	–	0	7	–	2	–	0
Alabama	6	–	2	–	0	6	–	3	–	0
LSU	3	–	1	–	1	6	–	2	–	1
Clemson	4	–	2	–	0	8	–	3	–	0
Vanderbilt	4	–	2	–	0	8	–	2	–	0
Tulane	3	–	3	–	1	6	–	3	–	1
Ole Miss	3	–	3	–	0	5	–	4	–	0
North Carolina	2	–	2	–	2	5	–	3	–	2
Kentucky	2	–	2	–	1	4	–	3	–	1
South Carolina	2	–	2	–	1	6	–	2	–	2
Maryland	2	–	3	–	1	6	–	3	–	1
VMI	2	–	3	–	1	5	–	3	–	2
Georgia	2	–	4	–	0	4	–	5	–	0
NC State	1	–	3	–	1	4	–	5	–	1
Mississippi A&M	1	–	4	–	0	2	–	4	–	2
Virginia	1	–	6	–	0	2	–	6	–	1
Washington and Lee	1	–	6	–	0	2	–	8	–	0
Sewanee	0	–	5	–	0	2	–	7	–	0
Auburn	0	–	7	–	0	1	–	8	–	0
$ – Conference champion; Rankings from Dickinson System

The 1928 Clemson Tigers football team represented Clemson College—now known as Clemson University—as a member of the Southern Conference (SoCon) during the 1928 college football season. Led by second-year head coach Josh Cody, the Tigers compiled an overall record of 8–3 with a mark of 4–2 in conference play, tying for seventh place in the SoCon.

Captain O. K. Pressley starred in the rivalry game with South Carolina, recording four tackles for a loss in a row despite a hand injury. He was the first Clemson Tiger to make any All-America team when he was selected third-team All-America at season's end.

== Schedule ==
Date	Opponent	Site	Result	Attendance	Source
September 22	Newberry*	Riggs Field; Calhoun, SC	W 30–0		
September 29	Davidson*	Riggs Field; Calhoun, SC	W 6–0		
October 6	at Auburn	Drake Field; Auburn, AL (rivalry)	W 6–0		
October 12	vs. NC State	Pee Dee Fairgrounds; Florence, SC (rivalry)	W 7–0	4,000	
October 19	Erskine*	Riggs Field; Calhoun, SC	W 52–0		
October 25	at South Carolina	State Fairgrounds; Columbia, SC (rivalry)	W 32–0	14,000	
November 3	at Ole Miss	Hemingway Stadium; Oxford, MS	L 7–26		
November 10	vs. VMI	Lynchburg, VA	W 12–0		
November 17	vs. Florida	Fairfield Stadium; Jacksonville, FL	L 6–27	15,000	
November 29	at Furman*	Manly Field; Greenville, SC	W 27–12	12,500	
December 8	The Citadel*	Johnson Hagood Stadium; Charleston, SC	L 7–12		
*Non-conference game
