= 1928 Ole Miss Rebels football team =

American college football season

1928 Ole Miss Rebels football
- Conference: Southern Conference
- Record: 5–4 (3–3 SoCon)
- Head coach: Homer Hazel (4th season)
- Home stadium: Hemingway Stadium

1928 Southern Conference football standings
	Conf.					Overall
Team	W		L		T	W		L		T
No. 3 Georgia Tech $	7	–	0	–	0	10	–	0	–	0
Tennessee	6	–	0	–	1	9	–	0	–	1
Florida	6	–	1	–	0	8	–	1	–	0
VPI	4	–	1	–	0	7	–	2	–	0
Alabama	6	–	2	–	0	6	–	3	–	0
LSU	3	–	1	–	1	6	–	2	–	1
Clemson	4	–	2	–	0	8	–	3	–	0
Vanderbilt	4	–	2	–	0	8	–	2	–	0
Tulane	3	–	3	–	1	6	–	3	–	1
Ole Miss	3	–	3	–	0	5	–	4	–	0
North Carolina	2	–	2	–	2	5	–	3	–	2
Kentucky	2	–	2	–	1	4	–	3	–	1
South Carolina	2	–	2	–	1	6	–	2	–	2
Maryland	2	–	3	–	1	6	–	3	–	1
VMI	2	–	3	–	1	5	–	3	–	2
Georgia	2	–	4	–	0	4	–	5	–	0
NC State	1	–	3	–	1	4	–	5	–	1
Mississippi A&M	1	–	4	–	0	2	–	4	–	2
Virginia	1	–	6	–	0	2	–	6	–	1
Washington and Lee	1	–	6	–	0	2	–	8	–	0
Sewanee	0	–	5	–	0	2	–	7	–	0
Auburn	0	–	7	–	0	1	–	8	–	0
$ – Conference champion; Rankings from Dickinson System

The 1928 Ole Miss Rebels football team represented the University of Mississippi (Ole Miss) as a member of the Southern Conference (SoCon) during the 1928 college football season. Led by fourth-year head coach Homer Hazel, the Rebels compiled an overall record of 5–4 with a mark of 3–3 in conference play, and finished tenth in the SoCon. Gee Walker and Thad Vann were on the team.

== Schedule ==
Date	Opponent	Site	Result	Source
September 29	Arkansas*	Hemingway Stadium; Oxford, MS (rivalry)	W 25–0	
October 6	at Alabama	Denny Stadium; Tuscaloosa, AL (rivalry)	L 0–27	
October 13	at Tennessee	Shields–Watkins Field; Knoxville, TN (rivalry)	L 12–13	
October 20	at Auburn	Legion Field; Birmingham, AL (rivalry)	W 19–0	
October 27	at Loyola (LA)*	Loyola University Stadium; New Orleans, LA	L 14–34	
November 3	Clemson	Hemingway Stadium; Oxford, MS	W 26–7	
November 10	at LSU	Tiger Stadium; Baton Rouge, LA (rivalry)	L 6–19	
November 17	at Southwestern (TN)*	Fargason Field; Memphis, TN	W 34–2	
November 29	at Mississippi A&M	Scott Field; Starkville, MS (Egg Bowl)	W 20–19	
*Non-conference game
