= 1928 Vanderbilt Commodores football team =

American college football season

1928 Vanderbilt Commodores football
- Conference: Southern Conference
- Record: 8–2 (4–2 SoCon)
- Head coach: Dan McGugin (24th season)
- Captain: Jimmy Armistead
- Home stadium: Dudley Field

Uniform
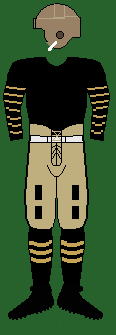

1928 Southern Conference football standings
	Conf.					Overall
Team	W		L		T	W		L		T
No. 3 Georgia Tech $	7	–	0	–	0	10	–	0	–	0
Tennessee	6	–	0	–	1	9	–	0	–	1
Florida	6	–	1	–	0	8	–	1	–	0
VPI	4	–	1	–	0	7	–	2	–	0
Alabama	6	–	2	–	0	6	–	3	–	0
LSU	3	–	1	–	1	6	–	2	–	1
Clemson	4	–	2	–	0	8	–	3	–	0
Vanderbilt	4	–	2	–	0	8	–	2	–	0
Tulane	3	–	3	–	1	6	–	3	–	1
Ole Miss	3	–	3	–	0	5	–	4	–	0
North Carolina	2	–	2	–	2	5	–	3	–	2
Kentucky	2	–	2	–	1	4	–	3	–	1
South Carolina	2	–	2	–	1	6	–	2	–	2
Maryland	2	–	3	–	1	6	–	3	–	1
VMI	2	–	3	–	1	5	–	3	–	2
Georgia	2	–	4	–	0	4	–	5	–	0
NC State	1	–	3	–	1	4	–	5	–	1
Mississippi A&M	1	–	4	–	0	2	–	4	–	2
Virginia	1	–	6	–	0	2	–	6	–	1
Washington and Lee	1	–	6	–	0	2	–	8	–	0
Sewanee	0	–	5	–	0	2	–	7	–	0
Auburn	0	–	7	–	0	1	–	8	–	0
$ – Conference champion; Rankings from Dickinson System

The 1926 Vanderbilt Commodores football team was an American football team that represented Vanderbilt University as a member of the Southern Conference during the 1928 college football season. In their 24th season under head coach Dan McGugin, Vanderbilt compiled an 8–2 record.

== Schedule ==
Date	Time	Opponent	Site	Result	Source
September 29		at Chattanooga*	Chamberlain Field; Chattanooga, TN	W 20–0	
October 6		Colgate*	Dudley Field; Nashville, TN	W 12–7	
October 13		at Texas*	Fair Park Stadium; Dallas, TX	W 13–12	
October 20		at Tulane	Tulane Stadium; New Orleans, LA	W 13–6	
October 27		Virginia	Dudley Field; Nashville, TN	W 34–0	
November 3		Kentucky	Dudley Field; Nashville, TN (rivalry)	W 14–7	
November 10		at Georgia Tech	Grant Field; Atlanta, GA (rivalry)	L 7–19	
November 17		Tennessee	Dudley Field; Nashville, TN (rivalry)	L 0–6	
November 24	2:00 p.m.	Centre*	Dudley Field; Nashville, TN	W 26–0	
November 29		Sewanee	Dudley Field; Nashville, TN (rivalry)	W 13–0	
*Non-conference game; All times are in Central time

== Coaching staff ==
- Dan McGugin (Michigan '03), head coach
- Johnny "Red" Floyd (Vanderbilt '20), assistant coach
- Lewie Hardage (Vanderbilt '12), backfield coach
- Hek Wakefield (Vanderbilt '24), end coach
- Gus Morrow (Vanderbilt '22), line coach
