= 1928 Sewanee Tigers football team =

American college football season

1928 Sewanee Tigers football
- Conference: Southern Conference
- Record: 2–7 (0–5 SoCon)
- Head coach: M. S. Bennett (6th season)
- Home stadium: Hardee Field

1928 Southern Conference football standings
	Conf.					Overall
Team	W		L		T	W		L		T
No. 3 Georgia Tech $	7	–	0	–	0	10	–	0	–	0
Tennessee	6	–	0	–	1	9	–	0	–	1
Florida	6	–	1	–	0	8	–	1	–	0
VPI	4	–	1	–	0	7	–	2	–	0
Alabama	6	–	2	–	0	6	–	3	–	0
LSU	3	–	1	–	1	6	–	2	–	1
Clemson	4	–	2	–	0	8	–	3	–	0
Vanderbilt	4	–	2	–	0	8	–	2	–	0
Tulane	3	–	3	–	1	6	–	3	–	1
Ole Miss	3	–	3	–	0	5	–	4	–	0
North Carolina	2	–	2	–	2	5	–	3	–	2
Kentucky	2	–	2	–	1	4	–	3	–	1
South Carolina	2	–	2	–	1	6	–	2	–	2
Maryland	2	–	3	–	1	6	–	3	–	1
VMI	2	–	3	–	1	5	–	3	–	2
Georgia	2	–	4	–	0	4	–	5	–	0
NC State	1	–	3	–	1	4	–	5	–	1
Mississippi A&M	1	–	4	–	0	2	–	4	–	2
Virginia	1	–	6	–	0	2	–	6	–	1
Washington and Lee	1	–	6	–	0	2	–	8	–	0
Sewanee	0	–	5	–	0	2	–	7	–	0
Auburn	0	–	7	–	0	1	–	8	–	0
$ – Conference champion; Rankings from Dickinson System

The 1928 Sewanee Tigers football team was an American football team that represented the Sewanee: The University of the South as a member of the Southern Conference during the 1928 college football season. Led by M. S. Bennett in his sixth season as head coach, the Tigers compiled an overall record of 2–7 with a mark of 0–5 in conference play.

== Schedule ==
Date	Opponent	Site	Result	Attendance	Source
September 29	Bryson College*	Hardee Field; Sewanee, TN	W 14–0		
October 6	at Texas A&M*	Fair Park Stadium; Dallas, TX	L 0–69		
October 13	Transylvania*	Hardee Field; Sewanee, TN	L 13–14		
October 20	Cumberland (TN)*	Hardee Field; Sewanee, TN	W 38–0	5,000	
October 27	at Alabama	Legion Field; Birmingham, AL	L 12–42	11,743	
November 3	at Florida	Fairfield Stadium; Jacksonville, FL	L 6–71	6,500	
November 10	at Tennessee	Shields–Watkins Field; Knoxville, TN	L 0–37		
November 17	at Tulane	Tulane Stadium; New Orleans, LA	L 6–41	12,000	
November 29	at Vanderbilt	Dudley Field; Nashville, TN (rivalry)	L 0–13	10,000	
*Non-conference game
