= 1928 William & Mary Indians football team =

American college football season

1928 William & Mary Indians football
- Conference: Virginia Conference
- Record: 6–3–2 (5–1 Virginia)
- Head coach: Branch Bocock (1st season)
- Captain: W. Carmichael
- Home stadium: Cary Field

1928 Virginia Conference football standings
	Conf.					Overall
Team	W		L		T	W		L		T
Emory and Henry $	3	–	0	–	0	10	–	0	–	0
William & Mary	5	–	1	–	0	6	–	3	–	2
Roanoke	3	–	2	–	1	4	–	4	–	1
Lynchburg	3	–	3	–	0	5	–	4	–	0
Richmond	2	–	3	–	1	3	–	4	–	2
Hampden–Sydney	2	–	3	–	0	3	–	6	–	0
Bridgewater	0	–	2	–	1	0	–	6	–	1
Randolph–Macon	0	–	4	–	1	0	–	7	–	1
$ – Conference champion

The 1928 William & Mary Indians football team represented the College of William & Mary as a member of the Virginia Conference during the 1928 college football season. Led by first-year head coach Branch Bocock, the Indians compiled an overall record of 6–3–2 with a mark of 5–1 in conference play, placing second in the Virginia Conference.

== Schedule ==
Date	Time	Opponent	Site	Result	Attendance	Source
September 22		Lynchburg	Williamsburg, VA	W 41–0		
September 29		Marshall*	Williamsburg, VA	T 0–0		
October 6		at Syracuse*	Archbold Stadium; Syracuse, NY	L 0–32		
October 13		Wake Forest*	Cary Field; Williamsburg, VA	T 0–0		
October 20		Catholic University*	Williamsburg, VA	L 12–13		
October 27		Emory and Henry	Cary Field; Williamsburg, VA	L 0–3	3,500	
November 3		at George Washington*	Central High School Stadium; Washington, DC	W 24–0		
November 12	2:30 p.m.	vs. Roanoke	Tate Field; Richmond, VA	W 32–6	4,000	
November 17		Bridgewater	Williamsburg, VA	W 68–0		
November 24		vs. Hampden–Sydney	Newport News, VA	W 34–0		
November 29	2:15 p.m.	at Richmond	Tate Field; Richmond, VA (rivalry)	W 7–0	11,000	
*Non-conference game; All times are in Eastern time
