= 1928 Maryland Aggies football team =

American college football season

1928 Maryland Aggies football
- Conference: Southern Conference
- Record: 6–3–1 (2–3–1 SoCon)
- Head coach: Curley Byrd (18th season)
- Home stadium: Byrd Stadium (original)

1928 Southern Conference football standings
	Conf.					Overall
Team	W		L		T	W		L		T
No. 3 Georgia Tech $	7	–	0	–	0	10	–	0	–	0
Tennessee	6	–	0	–	1	9	–	0	–	1
Florida	6	–	1	–	0	8	–	1	–	0
VPI	4	–	1	–	0	7	–	2	–	0
Alabama	6	–	2	–	0	6	–	3	–	0
LSU	3	–	1	–	1	6	–	2	–	1
Clemson	4	–	2	–	0	8	–	3	–	0
Vanderbilt	4	–	2	–	0	8	–	2	–	0
Tulane	3	–	3	–	1	6	–	3	–	1
Ole Miss	3	–	3	–	0	5	–	4	–	0
North Carolina	2	–	2	–	2	5	–	3	–	2
Kentucky	2	–	2	–	1	4	–	3	–	1
South Carolina	2	–	2	–	1	6	–	2	–	2
Maryland	2	–	3	–	1	6	–	3	–	1
VMI	2	–	3	–	1	5	–	3	–	2
Georgia	2	–	4	–	0	4	–	5	–	0
NC State	1	–	3	–	1	4	–	5	–	1
Mississippi A&M	1	–	4	–	0	2	–	4	–	2
Virginia	1	–	6	–	0	2	–	6	–	1
Washington and Lee	1	–	6	–	0	2	–	8	–	0
Sewanee	0	–	5	–	0	2	–	7	–	0
Auburn	0	–	7	–	0	1	–	8	–	0
$ – Conference champion; Rankings from Dickinson System

The 1928 Maryland Aggies football team was an American football team that represented the University of Maryland in the Southern Conference during the 1928 college football season. In their 18th season under head coach Curley Byrd, the Aggies compiled a 6–3–1 record (2–3–1 in conference), finished 14th in the Southern Conference, and outscored their opponents by a total of 132 to 70.

== Schedule ==
Date	Time	Opponent	Site	Result	Attendance	Source
September 29		Washington College*	Byrd Stadium; College Park, MD	W 31–0		
October 6		North Carolina	Byrd Stadium; College Park, MD	L 19–26		
October 13		at South Carolina	Melton Field; Columbia, SC	L 7–21		
October 20		Western Maryland*	Byrd Stadium; College Park, MD	W 13–6		
October 27		at VMI	Tate Field; Richmond, VA	T 0–0	7,000	
November 3	2:30 p.m.	vs. VPI	Norfolk Ball Park; Norfolk, VA	L 6–9		
November 10		at Yale*	Yale Bowl; New Haven, CT	W 6–0		
November 17		Virginia	Byrd Stadium; College Park, MD (rivalry)	W 18–2		
November 24		vs. Washington and Lee	Griffith Stadium; Washington, DC	W 6–0		
November 29		at Johns Hopkins*	Baltimore Stadium; Baltimore, MD	W 26–6	20,000	
*Non-conference game; All times are in Eastern time
