= 1928 Kentucky Wildcats football team =

American college football season

1928 Kentucky Wildcats football
- Conference: Southern Conference
- Record: 4–3–1 (2–2–1 SoCon)
- Head coach: Harry Gamage (2nd season)
- Captain: Claire Dees
- Home stadium: Stoll Field

1928 Southern Conference football standings
	Conf.					Overall
Team	W		L		T	W		L		T
No. 3 Georgia Tech $	7	–	0	–	0	10	–	0	–	0
Tennessee	6	–	0	–	1	9	–	0	–	1
Florida	6	–	1	–	0	8	–	1	–	0
VPI	4	–	1	–	0	7	–	2	–	0
Alabama	6	–	2	–	0	6	–	3	–	0
LSU	3	–	1	–	1	6	–	2	–	1
Clemson	4	–	2	–	0	8	–	3	–	0
Vanderbilt	4	–	2	–	0	8	–	2	–	0
Tulane	3	–	3	–	1	6	–	3	–	1
Ole Miss	3	–	3	–	0	5	–	4	–	0
North Carolina	2	–	2	–	2	5	–	3	–	2
Kentucky	2	–	2	–	1	4	–	3	–	1
South Carolina	2	–	2	–	1	6	–	2	–	2
Maryland	2	–	3	–	1	6	–	3	–	1
VMI	2	–	3	–	1	5	–	3	–	2
Georgia	2	–	4	–	0	4	–	5	–	0
NC State	1	–	3	–	1	4	–	5	–	1
Mississippi A&M	1	–	4	–	0	2	–	4	–	2
Virginia	1	–	6	–	0	2	–	6	–	1
Washington and Lee	1	–	6	–	0	2	–	8	–	0
Sewanee	0	–	5	–	0	2	–	7	–	0
Auburn	0	–	7	–	0	1	–	8	–	0
$ – Conference champion; Rankings from Dickinson System

Northwestern's Pass Attack plays Kentucky Wildcats, winning 7–0, October 20, 1928

The 1928 Kentucky Wildcats football team represented the University of Kentucky as a member of the Southern Conference (SoCon) during the 1928 college football season. Led by second-year head coach Harry Gamage, the Wildcats compiled an overall record of 4–3–1 with a mark of 2–2–1 in conference play, tying for ninth place in the SoCon. The team finished the season by tying undefeated Tennessee.

== Schedule ==
Date	Time	Opponent	Site	Result	Attendance	Source
October 6		Carson–Newman*	Stoll Field; Lexington, KY	W 61–0		
October 13		Washington and Lee	Stoll Field; Lexington, KY	W 6–0		
October 20		at Northwestern*	Dyche Stadium; Evanston, IL	L 0–7		
October 27	2:30 p.m.	Centre*	Stoll Field; Lexington, KY (rivalry)	W 8–0	5,000–6,000	
November 3		at Vanderbilt	Dudley Field; Nashville, TN	L 7–14		
November 10		at Alabama	Cramton Bowl; Montgomery, AL	L 0–14	7,500	
November 17		VMI	Stoll Field; Lexington, KY	W 18–6		
November 29		at Tennessee	Shields–Watkins Field; Knoxville, TN	T 0–0		
*Non-conference game; All times are in Central time
