= 1928 Georgia Bulldogs football team =

American college football season

1928 Georgia Bulldogs football
- Conference: Southern Conference
- Record: 4–5 (2–4 SoCon)
- Head coach: Harry Mehre (1st season)
- Captains: Glenn Lautzenhiser; Roy Jacobson
- Home stadium: Sanford Field

1928 Southern Conference football standings
	Conf.					Overall
Team	W		L		T	W		L		T
No. 3 Georgia Tech $	7	–	0	–	0	10	–	0	–	0
Tennessee	6	–	0	–	1	9	–	0	–	1
Florida	6	–	1	–	0	8	–	1	–	0
VPI	4	–	1	–	0	7	–	2	–	0
Alabama	6	–	2	–	0	6	–	3	–	0
LSU	3	–	1	–	1	6	–	2	–	1
Clemson	4	–	2	–	0	8	–	3	–	0
Vanderbilt	4	–	2	–	0	8	–	2	–	0
Tulane	3	–	3	–	1	6	–	3	–	1
Ole Miss	3	–	3	–	0	5	–	4	–	0
North Carolina	2	–	2	–	2	5	–	3	–	2
Kentucky	2	–	2	–	1	4	–	3	–	1
South Carolina	2	–	2	–	1	6	–	2	–	2
Maryland	2	–	3	–	1	6	–	3	–	1
VMI	2	–	3	–	1	5	–	3	–	2
Georgia	2	–	4	–	0	4	–	5	–	0
NC State	1	–	3	–	1	4	–	5	–	1
Mississippi A&M	1	–	4	–	0	2	–	4	–	2
Virginia	1	–	6	–	0	2	–	6	–	1
Washington and Lee	1	–	6	–	0	2	–	8	–	0
Sewanee	0	–	5	–	0	2	–	7	–	0
Auburn	0	–	7	–	0	1	–	8	–	0
$ – Conference champion; Rankings from Dickinson System

The 1928 Georgia Bulldogs football team represented the University of Georgia during the 1928 college football season. In their first year under head coach Harry Mehre, the Bulldogs completed the season with a 4–5 record.

== Schedule ==
Date	Opponent	Site	Result	Attendance	Source
October 6	Mercer*	Sanford Field; Athens, GA	W 52–0		
October 13	at Yale*	Yale Bowl; New Haven, CT	L 6–21		
October 19	Furman*	Sanford Field; Athens, GA	W 7–0		
October 27	Tulane^{†}	Sanford Field; Athens, GA	W 20–14		
November 3	vs. Auburn	Memorial Stadium; Columbus, GA (rivalry)	W 13–0		
November 10	vs. Florida	Municipal Stadium; Savannah, GA (rivalry)	L 6–26	16,000	
November 17	LSU	Sanford Field; Athens, GA	L 12–13		
November 29	at Alabama	Legion Field; Birmingham, AL (rivalry)	L 0–19	20,184	
December 8	at Georgia Tech	Grant Field; Atlanta, GA (rivalry)	L 6–20	40,000	
*Non-conference game; ^{†}Homecoming
