= 1928 Emory and Henry Wasps football team =

American college football season

1928 Emory and Henry Wasps football

Smokey Mountain champion Virginia Conference champion
- Conference: Smoky Mountain Conference, Virginia Conference
- Record: 10–0 (4–0 Smoky Mountain, 3–0 Virginia)
- Head coach: Pedie Jackson (2nd season)
- Home stadium: Fullerton Field

1928 Smoky Mountain Conference football standings
	Conf.					Overall
Team	W		L		T	W		L		T
Emory and Henry $	4	–	0	–	0	10	–	0	–	0
Maryville (TN)	3	–	0	–	0	6	–	2	–	1
Tusculum	2	–	2	–	1	4	–	2	–	2
King	2	–	3	–	0	3	–	5	–	0
Milligan	1	–	3	–	0	4	–	4	–	0
Carson–Newman	0	–	4	–	1	1	–	6	–	1
$ – Conference champion

1928 Virginia Conference football standings
	Conf.					Overall
Team	W		L		T	W		L		T
Emory and Henry $	3	–	0	–	0	10	–	0	–	0
William & Mary	5	–	1	–	0	6	–	3	–	2
Roanoke	3	–	2	–	1	4	–	4	–	1
Lynchburg	3	–	3	–	0	5	–	4	–	0
Richmond	2	–	3	–	1	3	–	4	–	2
Hampden–Sydney	2	–	3	–	0	3	–	6	–	0
Bridgewater	0	–	2	–	1	0	–	6	–	1
Randolph–Macon	0	–	4	–	1	0	–	7	–	1
$ – Conference champion

The 1928 Emory and Henry Wasps football team represented Emory and Henry College as a member of the Smoky Mountain Conference and the Virginia Conference during the 1928 college football season. Led by second-year head coach Pedie Jackson, the Wasp compiled an overall record of 10–0 with marks of 4–0 against Smoky Mountain opponents and 3–0 in Virginia Conference play, winning both conference titles.

== Schedule ==
Date	Time	Opponent	Site	Result	Attendance	Source
September 22		Rutherford*	Fullerton Field; Emory, VA	W 39–6	4,000	
September 29		Carson–Newman	Fullerton Field; Emory, VA	W 25–0		
October 6	8:00 p.m.	East Tennessee State Teachers*	Emory, VA	W 48–0		
October 13	3:00 p.m.	at Richmond	Tate Field; Richmond, VA	W 7–0		
October 20	8:00 p.m.	Roanoke^{†}	Fullerton Field; Emory, VA	W 21–6	4,500	
October 27		at William & Mary	Cary Field; Williamsburg, VA	W 3–0	3,500	
November 3		Tusculum	Emory, VA	W 28–0		
November 12	2:30 p.m.	at King	Tenneva Field; Bristol, VA	W 6–0		
November 17		Elon*	Fullerton Field; Emory, VA	W 37–0		
November 29	2:30 p.m.	at Milligan	Johnson City, TN	W 40–0		
*Non-conference game; ^{†}Homecoming; All times are in Eastern time
