= 1928 Auburn Tigers football team =

American college football season

1928 Auburn Tigers football
- Conference: Southern Conference
- Record: 1–8 (0–7 SoCon)
- Head coach: George Bohler (1st season)
- Home stadium: Drake Field; Legion Field; Cramton Bowl

1928 Southern Conference football standings
	Conf.					Overall
Team	W		L		T	W		L		T
No. 3 Georgia Tech $	7	–	0	–	0	10	–	0	–	0
Tennessee	6	–	0	–	1	9	–	0	–	1
Florida	6	–	1	–	0	8	–	1	–	0
VPI	4	–	1	–	0	7	–	2	–	0
Alabama	6	–	2	–	0	6	–	3	–	0
LSU	3	–	1	–	1	6	–	2	–	1
Clemson	4	–	2	–	0	8	–	3	–	0
Vanderbilt	4	–	2	–	0	8	–	2	–	0
Tulane	3	–	3	–	1	6	–	3	–	1
Ole Miss	3	–	3	–	0	5	–	4	–	0
North Carolina	2	–	2	–	2	5	–	3	–	2
Kentucky	2	–	2	–	1	4	–	3	–	1
South Carolina	2	–	2	–	1	6	–	2	–	2
Maryland	2	–	3	–	1	6	–	3	–	1
VMI	2	–	3	–	1	5	–	3	–	2
Georgia	2	–	4	–	0	4	–	5	–	0
NC State	1	–	3	–	1	4	–	5	–	1
Mississippi A&M	1	–	4	–	0	2	–	4	–	2
Virginia	1	–	6	–	0	2	–	6	–	1
Washington and Lee	1	–	6	–	0	2	–	8	–	0
Sewanee	0	–	5	–	0	2	–	7	–	0
Auburn	0	–	7	–	0	1	–	8	–	0
$ – Conference champion; Rankings from Dickinson System

The 1928 Auburn Tigers football team represented Auburn University in the 1928 college football season. The Tigers' were led by head coach George Bohler in his first season and finished the season with a record of 1–8 overall and 0–7 in Southern Conference (SoCon) play.

== Schedule ==
Date	Opponent	Site	Result	Attendance	Source
September 28	Birmingham–Southern*	Cramton Bowl; Montgomery, AL	L 0–6		
October 6	Clemson^{†}	Drake Field; Auburn, AL (rivalry)	L 0–6		
October 13	at Florida	Fleming Field; Gainesville, FL (rivalry)	L 0–27	6,000	
October 20	Ole Miss	Legion Field; Birmingham, AL (rivalry)	L 0–19		
October 27	Howard (AL)*	Drake Field; Auburn, AL	W 25–6		
November 3	vs. Georgia	Memorial Stadium; Columbus, GA (rivalry)	L 0–13		
November 10	at Tulane	Tulane Stadium; New Orleans, LA (rivalry)	L 12–13		
November 17	Mississippi A&M	Legion Field; Birmingham, AL	L 0–13		
November 29	at Georgia Tech	Grant Field; Atlanta, GA (rivalry)	L 0–51	40,000	
*Non-conference game; ^{†}Homecoming
