= Pedie Jackson =

American sports coach and administrator (1898–1938)

Biographical details
- Born: October 19, 1898
- Died: August 31, 1938 (aged 39); Bristol, Virginia, U.S.

Playing career

Football
- c. 1919: Emory and Henry

Basketball
- c. 1919: Emory and Henry

Baseball
- c. 1919: Emory and Henry

Coaching career (HC unless noted)

Football
- 1921: Alexander (TX)
- 1922: Virginia HS (VA)
- 1923–1926: Concord
- 1927–1935: Emory and Henry
- 1936–1937: King

Basketball
- 1924–1927: Concord
- 1929–1936: Emory and Henry

Head coaching record
- Overall: 101–36–7 (college football); 5–1–2 (junior college football); 7–0–1 (high school football)

Accomplishments and honors

Championships
- Football; 2 Smoky Mountain (1928–1929); 2 Virginia Conference (1928, 1933)

William Senter "Pedie" Jackson (October 19, 1898 – August 31, 1938) was an American football and basketball coach and college athletics administrator. He served as the head football coach at Concord College—now known as Concord University—in Athens, West Virginia from 1923 to 1926, Emory and Henry College in Emory, Virginia from 1927 to 1935, and King College—now known as King University—in Bristol, Tennessee from 1936 to 1937.

A native of Johnson City, Tennessee, Jackson played football, basketball, and baseball at Emory and Henry before graduating with an A.B. degree in 1920. He began his coaching career in 1921 at Alexander College—now known as Lon Morris College—a junior college in Jacksonville, Texas, leading his football team to a record of 5–1–2. The next year, he coached the football team at Virginia High School in Bristol, Virginia to a record of 7–0–1.

Jackson died of pneumonia, on August 31, 1938, at King Mountain Memorial Hospital in Bristol, Virginia.

== Head coaching record ==
=== College football ===
Year	Team	Overall	Conference	Standing	Bowl/playoffs
Concord Mountain Lions (Independent) (1923–1924)
1923	Concord	8–0			
1924	Concord	6–2–1			
Concord Mountain Lions (West Virginia Athletic Conference) (1925–1926)
1925	Concord	4–3–1	1–2	NA	
1926	Concord	6–1–1	3–1	T–2nd	
Concord:		24–6–3	4–3		
Emory and Henry Wasps (Smoky Mountain Conference / Virginia Conference) (1927–1929)
1927	Emory and Henry	9–0	3–0 / 1–0	T–1st (Note: Emory and Henry, Maryville, and Milligan all finished the year 3–0 in Smoky Mountain Conference play, but no conference title was awarded.) / 2nd	
1928	Emory and Henry	10–0	4–0 / 3–0	1st / 1st	
1929	Emory and Henry	7–2–1	3–0 / 3–1	1st / 3rd	
Emory and Henry Wasps (Virginia Conference) (1930–1935)
1930	Emory and Henry	8–1–1	3–1	2nd	
1931	Emory and Henry	6–5	2–3	T–4th	
1932	Emory and Henry	4–4–1	0–3	T–6th	
1933	Emory and Henry	10–1	2–1	T–1st	
1934	Emory and Henry	8–2	1–2	T–3rd	
1935	Emory and Henry	6–4			
Emory and Henry:		68–19–3			
King Tornado (Smoky Mountain Conference) (1936–1937)
1936	King	5–5	3–3	T–5th	
1937	King	4–6–1	2–3–1	5th	
King:		9–11–1	5–6–1		
Total:		101–36–7			
National championship Conference title Conference division title or championship game berth
