= 1928 Tennessee Volunteers football team =

American college football season

1928 Tennessee Volunteers football
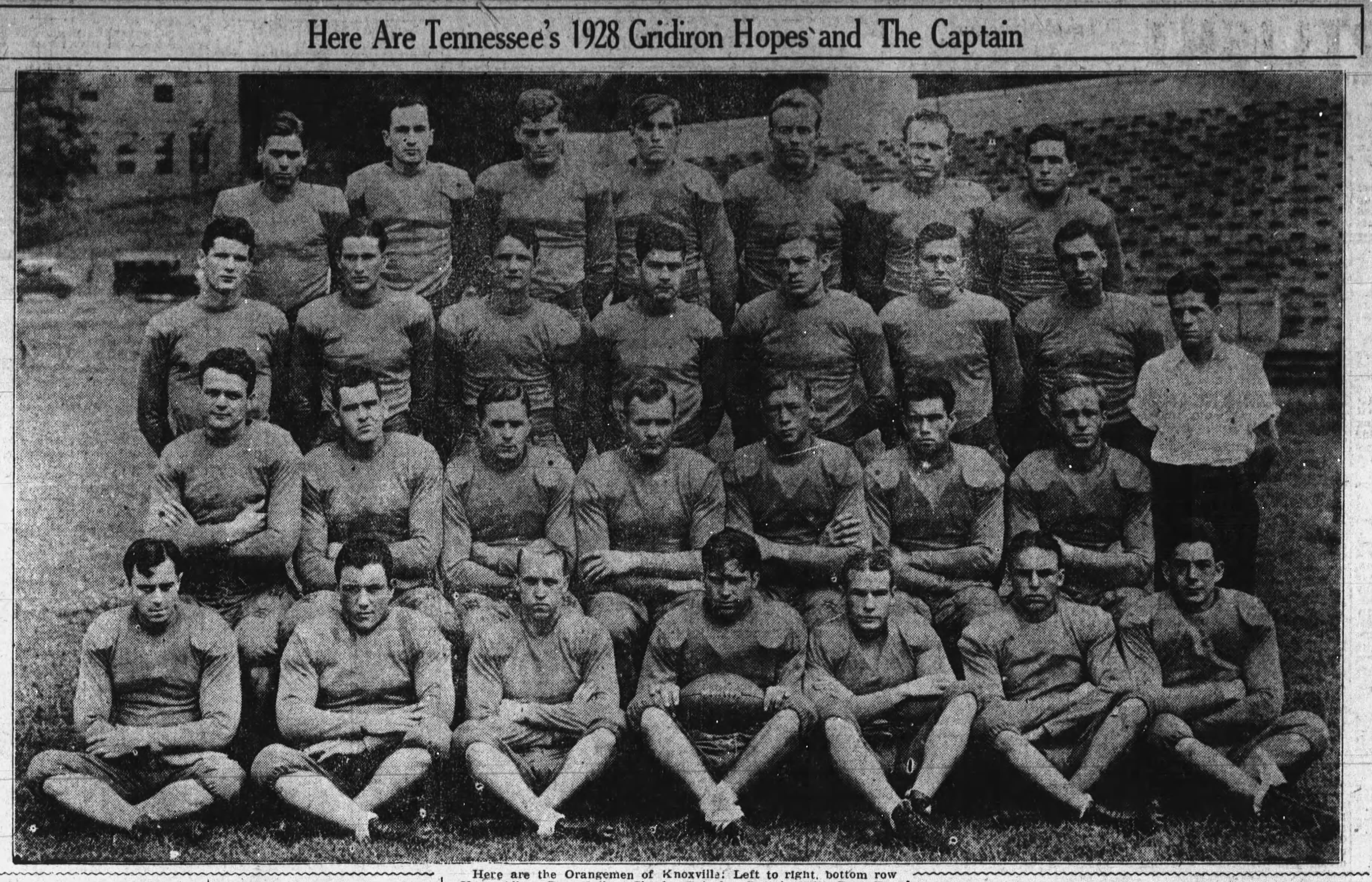
- A group photo of the 1928 Tennessee Volunteers football team
- Conference: Southern Conference
- Record: 9–0–1 (6–0–1 SoCon)
- Head coach: Robert Neyland (3rd season)
- Offensive scheme: Single-wing
- Captain: Roy Witt
- Home stadium: Shields–Watkins Field

1928 Southern Conference football standings
	Conf.					Overall
Team	W		L		T	W		L		T
No. 3 Georgia Tech $	7	–	0	–	0	10	–	0	–	0
Tennessee	6	–	0	–	1	9	–	0	–	1
Florida	6	–	1	–	0	8	–	1	–	0
VPI	4	–	1	–	0	7	–	2	–	0
Alabama	6	–	2	–	0	6	–	3	–	0
LSU	3	–	1	–	1	6	–	2	–	1
Clemson	4	–	2	–	0	8	–	3	–	0
Vanderbilt	4	–	2	–	0	8	–	2	–	0
Tulane	3	–	3	–	1	6	–	3	–	1
Ole Miss	3	–	3	–	0	5	–	4	–	0
North Carolina	2	–	2	–	2	5	–	3	–	2
Kentucky	2	–	2	–	1	4	–	3	–	1
South Carolina	2	–	2	–	1	6	–	2	–	2
Maryland	2	–	3	–	1	6	–	3	–	1
VMI	2	–	3	–	1	5	–	3	–	2
Georgia	2	–	4	–	0	4	–	5	–	0
NC State	1	–	3	–	1	4	–	5	–	1
Mississippi A&M	1	–	4	–	0	2	–	4	–	2
Virginia	1	–	6	–	0	2	–	6	–	1
Washington and Lee	1	–	6	–	0	2	–	8	–	0
Sewanee	0	–	5	–	0	2	–	7	–	0
Auburn	0	–	7	–	0	1	–	8	–	0
$ – Conference champion; Rankings from Dickinson System

The 1928 Tennessee Volunteers football team (variously "Tennessee", "UT" or the "Vols") represented the University of Tennessee in the 1928 Southern Conference football season. Playing as a member of the Southern Conference (SoCon), the team was led by head coach Robert Neyland, in his third year, and played their home games at Shields–Watkins Field in Knoxville, Tennessee. The 1928 Vols won nine, lost zero and tied one game (9–0–1 overall, 6–0–1 in the SoCon). The only blemish on their schedule was a scoreless tie with Kentucky. Tennessee outscored their opponents 249 to 51 and posted five shutouts.

On November 17, Tennessee beat in-state rival Vanderbilt for the first time since 1916. Before 1928, Vanderbilt held a strong advantage over the Volunteers with a record of 18–2–3 in the first 23 meetings between the two school. Since 1928, Tennessee has dominated the rivalry.

== Schedule ==
Date	Time	Opponent	Site	Result	Source
September 29		Maryville (TN)*	Shields–Watkins Field; Knoxville, TN	W 41–0	
October 6	2:30 p.m.	Centre*	Shields–Watkins Field; Knoxville, TN	W 41–7	
October 13		Ole Miss	Shields–Watkins Field; Knoxville, TN (rivalry)	W 13–12	
October 20		at Alabama	Denny Field; Tuscaloosa, AL (rivalry)	W 15–13	
October 27		Washington and Lee^{†}	Shields–Watkins Field; Knoxville, TN	W 26–7	
November 3		Carson–Newman*	Shields–Watkins Field; Knoxville, TN	W 57–0	
November 10		Sewanee	Shields–Watkins Field; Knoxville, TN	W 37–0	
November 17		at Vanderbilt	Dudley Field; Nashville, TN (rivalry)	W 6–0	
November 29		Kentucky	Shields–Watkins Field; Knoxville, TN (rivalry)	T 0–0	
December 8		Florida	Shields–Watkins Field; Knoxville, TN (rivalry)	W 13–12	
*Non-conference game; ^{†}Homecoming; All times are in Central time

== Players ==
=== Line ===
Number	Player	Position	Games started	Hometown	Prep school	Height	Weight	Age
25	Herc Alley	end						
29	L. Philip Beene	tackle						
31	Fritz Brandt	end		Erwin, Tennessee				
50	M. Corbett	end						
37	Jim Finney	center						
21	Ben Fuller	guard						
39	Houston Herndon	end						
26	Paul Hug	end		Kingsport, Tennessee	Kingsport High		172	
35	Bo Hundley	tackle						
20	L. B. "Farmer" Johnson	guard						
13	Howard Johnson	tackle						
22	James G. Johnston	tackle						
48	Kinnane	end						
33	Ted Lowe	end						
36	Harry Meyer	tackle						
35	Moss	guard						
23	Louis Roberts	center						
32	Stringer	center						
34	Conrad Templeton	guard						
24	Harry Thayer	tackle						
27	Arthur Tripp	guard						
43	George Wiggs	center						

=== Backfield ===
Number	Player	Position	Games started	Hometown	Prep school	Height	Weight	Age
62	Edwin Corbett	halfback						
52	Quinn Decker	halfback		Knoxville, Tennessee	Central High			
17	Bobby Dodd	quarterback		Kingsport, Tennessee	Kingsport High	6'1"	170	
12	Hugh Faust	halfback		Knoxville, Tennessee	Central High			
15	Buddy Hackman	halfback		Nashville, Tennessee	Hume-Fogg H. S.	5'11"	175	
16	Amos Horner	fullback						
44	Pal McAdams	halfback						
28	Gene McEver	halfback		Bristol, Virginia	Bristol High	5'10"	185	
18	McGehee	fullback						
38	Charles Reineke	quarterback						
49	Carl Reischling	halfback						
19	Vincent Tudor	quarterback						
14	Roy Witt	quarterback						
