= 1928 Richmond Spiders football team =

American college football season

1928 Richmond Spiders football
- Conference: Virginia Conference
- Record: 3–4–2 (2–3–1 Virginia)
- Head coach: Frank Dobson (15th season)
- Captain: Taylor Sanford
- Home stadium: Tate Field

1928 Virginia Conference football standings
	Conf.					Overall
Team	W		L		T	W		L		T
Emory and Henry $	3	–	0	–	0	10	–	0	–	0
William & Mary	5	–	1	–	0	6	–	3	–	2
Roanoke	3	–	2	–	1	4	–	4	–	1
Lynchburg	3	–	3	–	0	5	–	4	–	0
Richmond	2	–	3	–	1	3	–	4	–	2
Hampden–Sydney	2	–	3	–	0	3	–	6	–	0
Bridgewater	0	–	2	–	1	0	–	6	–	1
Randolph–Macon	0	–	4	–	1	0	–	7	–	1
$ – Conference champion

The 1928 Richmond Spiders football team was an American football team that represented the University of Richmond as a member of the Virginia Conference during the 1928 college football season. Led by 15th-year head coach, Frank Dobson, Richmond compiled an overall record of 3–4–2. The team included Herbie Peterson, whom Dobson considered one of the three best backs he ever coached. Richmond played their home games at Tate Field on Mayo Island.

== Schedule ==
Date	Time	Opponent	Site	Result	Attendance	Source
September 29		at VMI*	Alumni Field; Lexington, VA (rivalry)	T 6–6		
October 6		at Johns Hopkins*	Homewood Field; Baltimore, MD	L 13–14	5,000	
October 13	3:00 p.m.	Emory and Henry	Tate Field; Richmond, VA	L 0–7		
October 20		at Elon*	World War Memorial Stadium; Greensboro, NC	W 34–0		
October 27		at Roanoke	Maher Field; Roanoke, VA	T 13–13		
November 3		Lynchburg	Tate Field; Richmond, VA	W 50–16		
November 10		Randolph–Macon	Tate Field; Richmond, VA	W 30–0	1,000	
November 17	2:30 p.m.	Hampden–Sydney	Tate Field; Richmond, VA	L 0–13	5,000	
November 29	2:15 p.m.	William & Mary	Tate Field; Richmond, VA (rivalry)	L 0–7	11,000	
*Non-conference game; All times are in Eastern time
