= 1928 Tulane Green Wave football team =

American college football season

1928 Tulane Green Wave football
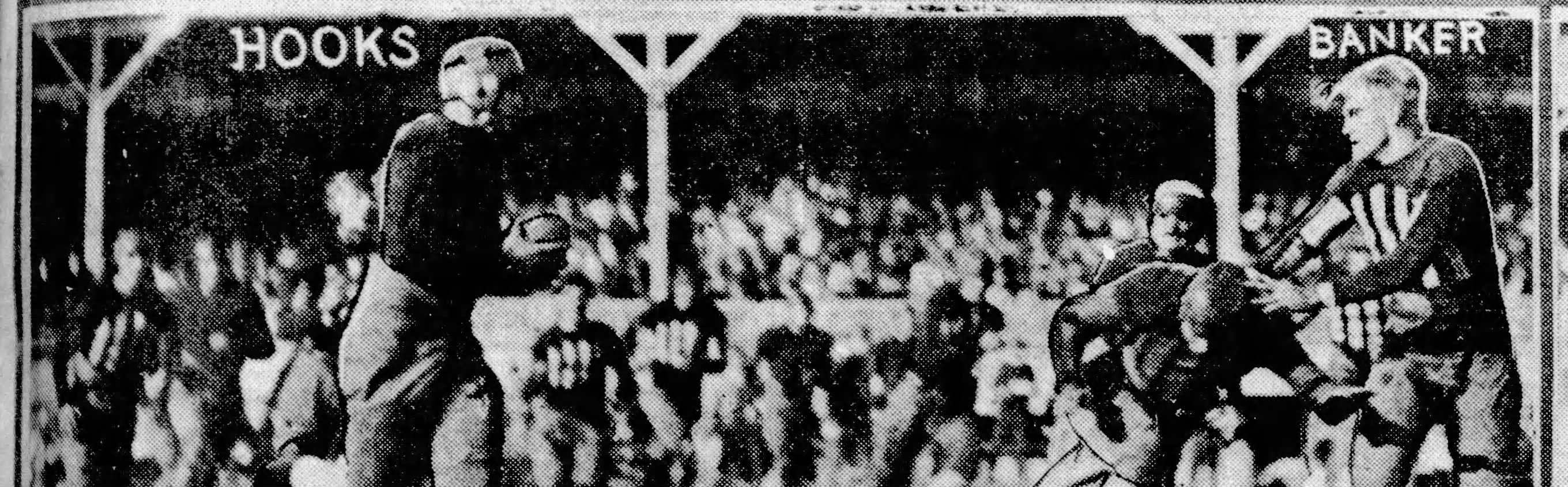
- Bobby Hooks and Bill Banker of the 1928 Tulane Green Wave football team in a match against the Georgia Bulldogs
- Conference: Southern Conference
- Record: 6–3–1 (3–3–1 SoCon)
- Head coach: Bernie Bierman (2nd season)
- Offensive scheme: Single-wing
- Captain: Charles Rucker
- Home stadium: Tulane Stadium

1928 Southern Conference football standings
	Conf.					Overall
Team	W		L		T	W		L		T
No. 3 Georgia Tech $	7	–	0	–	0	10	–	0	–	0
Tennessee	6	–	0	–	1	9	–	0	–	1
Florida	6	–	1	–	0	8	–	1	–	0
VPI	4	–	1	–	0	7	–	2	–	0
Alabama	6	–	2	–	0	6	–	3	–	0
LSU	3	–	1	–	1	6	–	2	–	1
Clemson	4	–	2	–	0	8	–	3	–	0
Vanderbilt	4	–	2	–	0	8	–	2	–	0
Tulane	3	–	3	–	1	6	–	3	–	1
Ole Miss	3	–	3	–	0	5	–	4	–	0
North Carolina	2	–	2	–	2	5	–	3	–	2
Kentucky	2	–	2	–	1	4	–	3	–	1
South Carolina	2	–	2	–	1	6	–	2	–	2
Maryland	2	–	3	–	1	6	–	3	–	1
VMI	2	–	3	–	1	5	–	3	–	2
Georgia	2	–	4	–	0	4	–	5	–	0
NC State	1	–	3	–	1	4	–	5	–	1
Mississippi A&M	1	–	4	–	0	2	–	4	–	2
Virginia	1	–	6	–	0	2	–	6	–	1
Washington and Lee	1	–	6	–	0	2	–	8	–	0
Sewanee	0	–	5	–	0	2	–	7	–	0
Auburn	0	–	7	–	0	1	–	8	–	0
$ – Conference champion; Rankings from Dickinson System

The 1928 Tulane Green Wave football team was an American football team that represented Tulane University as a member of the Southern Conference (SoCon) during the 1928 college football season. In its second year under head coach Bernie Bierman, the Green Wave compiled a 6–3–1 record (3–3–1 in conference games), finished ninth in the SoCon, and outscored opponents by a total of 264 to 76.

Tulane played its home games at Tulane Stadium in New Orleans.

== Schedule ==
Date	Opponent	Site	Result	Attendance	Source
September 29	Louisiana Normal*	Tulane Stadium; New Orleans, LA	W 65–0		
October 6	vs. Mississippi A&M	Municipal Stadium; Jackson, MS	W 51–6		
October 13	Georgia Tech	Tulane Stadium; New Orleans, LA	L 0–12		
October 20	Vanderbilt	Tulane Stadium; New Orleans, LA	L 6–13		
October 27	at Georgia	Sanford Field; Athens, GA	L 14–20		
November 3	Millsaps*	Tulane Stadium; New Orleans, LA	W 27–0		
November 10	Auburn	Tulane Stadium; New Orleans, LA (rivalry)	W 13–12		
November 17	Sewanee	Tulane Stadium; New Orleans, LA	W 41–6	12,000	
November 24	Louisiana College*	Tulane Stadium; New Orleans, LA	W 47–7	8,000	
November 29	LSU	Tulane Stadium; New Orleans, LA (Battle for the Rag)	T 0–0		
*Non-conference game
