= Chuck Collins (American football) =

American football player and coach (1903–1977)

- Collins pictured in Yackety Yack 1931, North Carolina yearbook

Biographical details
- Born: August 27, 1903
- Died: April 14, 1977 (aged 73); Ridgewood, New Jersey, U.S.

Playing career
- 1922–1924: Notre Dame
- Position: End

Coaching career (HC unless noted)
- 1925: Chattanooga (line)
- 1926–1933: North Carolina

Head coaching record
- Overall: 38–31–9

Charles C. Collins (August 27, 1903 – April 14, 1977) was an American college football player and coach. He served as the head football coach at the University of North Carolina at Chapel Hill from 1926 to 1933, compiling a record of 38–31–9. Collins played college football as an end at the University of Notre Dame from 1922 to 1924. He was a member of the "Seven Mules" line that blocked for the famous "Four Horsemen" backfield on Knute Rockne's national championship team of 1924.

Collins attended St. Ignatius College Prep in Chicago and entered Notre Dame in 1921 on a basketball scholarship, but failed to make the freshman team. He died on April 14, 1977, at The Valley Hospital in Ridgewood, New Jersey.

== Head coaching record ==
Year	Team	Overall	Conference	Standing	Bowl/playoffs
North Carolina Tar Heels (Southern Conference) (1926–1933)
1926	North Carolina	4–5	3–3	T–10th	
1927	North Carolina	4–6	2–5	19th	
1928	North Carolina	5–3–2	3–2–2	9th	
1929	North Carolina	9–1	7–1	3rd	
1930	North Carolina	5–3–2	4–2–2	8th	
1931	North Carolina	4–3–3	2–3–3	12th	
1932	North Carolina	3–5–2	2–5–1	17th	
1933	North Carolina	4–5	2–1	3rd	
North Carolina:		38–31–9	25–22–8		
Total:		38–31–9			
