= 1928 Alabama Crimson Tide football team =

American college football season

1928 Alabama Crimson Tide football
- Conference: Southern Conference
- Record: 6–3 (6–2 SoCon)
- Head coach: Wallace Wade (6th season)
- Offensive scheme: Single-wing
- Captain: Earl Smith
- Home stadium: Denny Field; Legion Field; Cramton Bowl

1928 Southern Conference football standings
	Conf.					Overall
Team	W		L		T	W		L		T
No. 3 Georgia Tech $	7	–	0	–	0	10	–	0	–	0
Tennessee	6	–	0	–	1	9	–	0	–	1
Florida	6	–	1	–	0	8	–	1	–	0
VPI	4	–	1	–	0	7	–	2	–	0
Alabama	6	–	2	–	0	6	–	3	–	0
LSU	3	–	1	–	1	6	–	2	–	1
Clemson	4	–	2	–	0	8	–	3	–	0
Vanderbilt	4	–	2	–	0	8	–	2	–	0
Tulane	3	–	3	–	1	6	–	3	–	1
Ole Miss	3	–	3	–	0	5	–	4	–	0
North Carolina	2	–	2	–	2	5	–	3	–	2
Kentucky	2	–	2	–	1	4	–	3	–	1
South Carolina	2	–	2	–	1	6	–	2	–	2
Maryland	2	–	3	–	1	6	–	3	–	1
VMI	2	–	3	–	1	5	–	3	–	2
Georgia	2	–	4	–	0	4	–	5	–	0
NC State	1	–	3	–	1	4	–	5	–	1
Mississippi A&M	1	–	4	–	0	2	–	4	–	2
Virginia	1	–	6	–	0	2	–	6	–	1
Washington and Lee	1	–	6	–	0	2	–	8	–	0
Sewanee	0	–	5	–	0	2	–	7	–	0
Auburn	0	–	7	–	0	1	–	8	–	0
$ – Conference champion; Rankings from Dickinson System

The 1928 Alabama Crimson Tide football team (variously "Alabama", "UA" or "Bama") represented the University of Alabama in the 1928 college football season. It was the Crimson Tide's 35th overall and 7th season as a member of the Southern Conference (SoCon). The team was led by head coach Wallace Wade, in his sixth year, and played their home games at Denny Field in Tuscaloosa, at Legion Field in Birmingham and at the Cramton Bowl in Montgomery, Alabama. They finished the season with a record of six wins and three losses (6–3 overall, 6–2 in the SoCon).

Alabama's October 20 meeting with Tennessee was the first game between the two schools in 14 years. While the game had been played on irregular dates up until 1914, when the series was renewed in 1928 the game was scheduled for the Third Saturday in October. Alabama and Tennessee have played yearly ever since, except when interrupted by World War II in 1943, although the game has more frequently been scheduled for the fourth Saturday in October since the SEC expanded to 12 teams in 1992. Alabama lost this renewal of the series 15–13, victimized by poor special teams play (a 98-yard kickoff return for Tennessee to open the game, a safety on a fumbled punt, a missed extra point) and mistakes (an offsides penalty that kept a Tennessee drive alive, leading to its second touchdown).

== Schedule ==
Date	Opponent	Site	Result	Attendance	Source
October 6	Ole Miss	Denny Field; Tuscaloosa, AL (rivalry)	W 27–0	6,000	
October 13	at Mississippi A&M	Scott Field; Starkville, MS (rivalry)	W 46–0	8,000	
October 20	Tennessee^{†}	Denny Field; Tuscaloosa, AL (rivalry)	L 13–15	8,000	
October 27	Sewanee	Legion Field; Birmingham, AL	W 42–12	11,743	
November 3	at Wisconsin*	Camp Randall Stadium; Madison, WI	L 0–15	25,000	
November 10	Kentucky	Cramton Bowl; Montgomery, AL	W 14–0	7,500	
November 17	at Georgia Tech	Grant Field; Atlanta, GA (rivalry)	L 13–33	20,000	
November 29	Georgia	Legion Field; Birmingham, AL (rivalry)	W 19–0	20,184	
December 8	LSU	Legion Field; Birmingham, AL (rivalry)	W 13–0	12,000	
*Non-conference game; ^{†}Homecoming
