= George Bohler =

American sports coach (1887–1968)

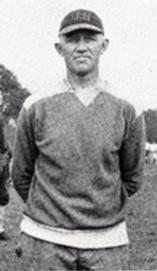
- Bohler pictured in The 1929 Glomerata, Auburn yearbook

Biographical details
- Born: February 8, 1887; Berks County, Pennsylvania, U.S.
- Died: December 10, 1968 (aged 81); Washington, D.C., U.S.

Playing career
- 1910–1914: Washington State

Coaching career (HC unless noted)

Football
- 1920–1922: Oregon (assistant)
- 1923–1927: Mississippi College
- 1928–1929: Auburn
- 1930–1933: Louisiana Tech
- 1937: Ole Miss (assistant)

Basketball
- 1920–1923: Oregon
- 1925–1928: Mississippi College
- 1928–1929: Auburn
- 1935–1938: Ole Miss

Baseball
- 1921–1923: Oregon

Head coaching record
- Overall: 40–44–4 (football); 96–81 (basketball); 11–43 (baseball)

George Mohn "Doc" Bohler (February 8, 1887 – December 10, 1968) was an American football, basketball, and baseball coach. He served as the head football coach at Mississippi College (1923–1927), Auburn University (1928–1929), and Louisiana Tech University (1930–1933), compiling a career college football record of 40–44–4. Bohler was also the head basketball coach at the University of Oregon (1920–1923), Auburn (1928–1929), and the University of Mississippi (1935–1938), amassing a career college basketball mark of 96–81, and served as the head baseball coach at Oregon (1921–1923), tallying a record of 11–43.

Bohler was born on February 8, 1887. He died in December 1968 and was buried in Arlington National Cemetery. He was a brother of Fred Bohler and Roy Bohler.

== Coaching career ==
After he served as an assistant coach at Oregon, Bohler was hired as head coach at Mississippi College in June 1923. After five seasons with the Choctaws, in December 1927 Bohler was hired as head coach at Auburn. From 1928 to 1929, Bohler coached football and basketball at Auburn. He compiled a 3–11 record with the Auburn Tigers football team and a 6–15 record with the basketball team. From 1930 to 1933, Bohler coached football at Louisiana Tech, where he had greater success. He posted a 15–17 record in four seasons. His 1931 team went undefeated at 7–0.

== Head coaching record ==
=== Football ===
| Year | Team | Overall | Conference | Standing | Bowl/playoffs |
|---|---|---|---|---|---|
Mississippi College Choctaws (Southern Intercollegiate Athletic Association) (1923–1927)
| 1923 | Mississippi College | 5–1–2 | 3–0–1 | 5th | |
| 1924 | Mississippi College | 2–5–1 | 2–0–1 | 3rd | |
| 1925 | Mississippi College | 1–7–1 | 1–5–1 | 17th | |
| 1926 | Mississippi College | 6–3 | 5–2 | 10th | |
| 1927 | Mississippi College | 8–0 | 8–0 | T–1st | |
| Mississippi College: | | 22–16–4 | 19–7–3 | | |
Auburn Tigers (Southern Conference) (1928–1929)
| 1928 | Auburn | 1–8 | 0–7 | 23rd | |
| 1929 | Auburn | 2–3 (Note: Johnny Floyd coached the last four games of the season.) | 0–3 | | |
| Auburn: | | 3–11 | 0–10 | | |
Louisiana Tech Bulldogs (Southern Intercollegiate Athletic Association) (1930–1933)
| 1930 | Louisiana Tech | 3–6 | 2–5 | 21st | |
| 1931 | Louisiana Tech | 7–0 | 6–0 | 2nd | |
| 1932 | Louisiana Tech | 4–4 | 3–3 | T–14th | |
| 1933 | Louisiana Tech | 1–7 | 1–3 | 22nd | |
| Louisiana Tech: | | 15–17 | 12–11 | | |
| Total: | | 40–44–4 | | | |
National championship Conference title Conference division title or championship game berth
