= Bob Gillson =

American football player (1905–1992)

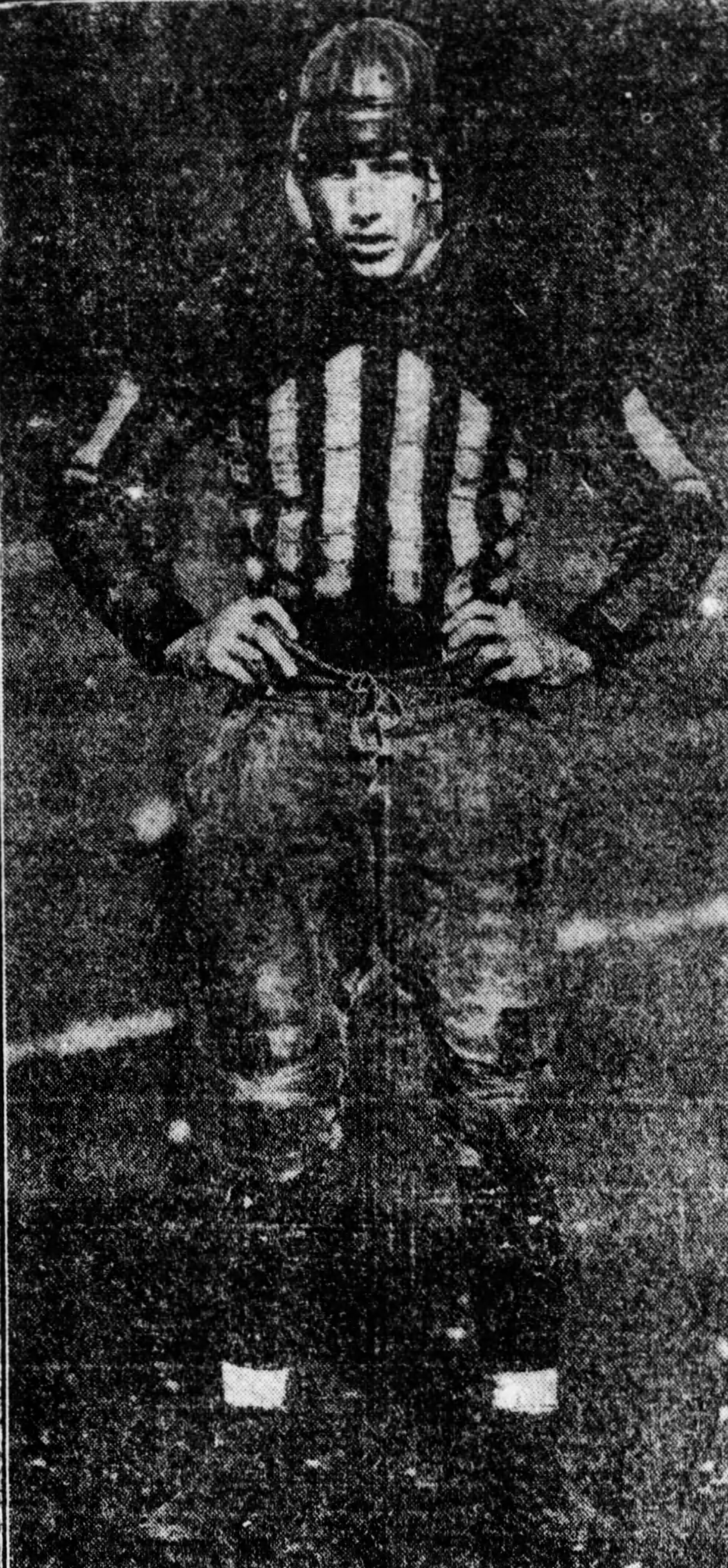
- Bob Gillson, 1929

Profile
- Position: Guard

Personal information
- Born: May 4, 1905; Binghamton, New York
- Died: November 16, 1992 (aged 87)
- Listed height: 6 ft 0 in (1.83 m)
- Listed weight: 208 lb (94 kg)

Career information
- High school: Binghamton Central (NY)
- College: Colgate

Career history
- Brooklyn Dodgers (1930-1931)

Robert William Gillson (May 4, 1905 – November 16, 1992) was an American football player. He played college football for Colgate and in the National Football League (NFL) as an end for the Brooklyn Dodgers during the 1930 and 1931 seasons. He appeared in 23 NFL games, 19 as a starter.

He was hired as the line coach at Middlebury College in 1932. One year later, he was hired as the line coach at Colgate. He was appointed in 1935 as a full-time member of the Colgate faculty in the physical education department. He served for a decade as the supervisor of freshman and athletics. During World War II, he served in the U.S. Navy and attained the rank of lieutenant commander. In 1947, he rejoined the Colgate coaching staff as line coach.
