= 1928 Roanoke Maroons football team =

American college football season

1928 Roanoke Maroons football
- Conference: Virginia Conference
- Record: 4–4–1 (3–2–1 Virginia)
- Head coach: Pinky Spruhan (15th season)
- Home stadium: College Field; Maher Field

1928 Virginia Conference football standings
	Conf.					Overall
Team	W		L		T	W		L		T
Emory and Henry $	3	–	0	–	0	10	–	0	–	0
William & Mary	5	–	1	–	0	6	–	3	–	2
Roanoke	3	–	2	–	1	4	–	4	–	1
Lynchburg	3	–	3	–	0	5	–	4	–	0
Richmond	2	–	3	–	1	3	–	4	–	2
Hampden–Sydney	2	–	3	–	0	3	–	6	–	0
Bridgewater	0	–	2	–	1	0	–	6	–	1
Randolph–Macon	0	–	4	–	1	0	–	7	–	1
$ – Conference champion

The 1928 Roanoke Maroons football team represented Roanoke College as a member of the Virginia Conference during the 1928 college football season. Led by 15th-year head coach Pinky Spruhan, the Maroons compiled an overall record of 4–4–1, with a mark of 3–2–1 in conference play, and finished third in the Virginia Conference.

== Schedule ==
Date	Time	Opponent	Site	Result	Attendance	Source
September 29		at VPI*	Miles Stadium; Blacksburg, VA	L 7–34		
October 6		Guilford*	College Field; Salem, VA	W 33–9		
October 13		at VMI*	Alumni Field; Lexington, VA	L 13–31		
October 20	8:00 p.m.	at Emory and Henry	Fullerton Field; Emory, VA	L 6–21	4,500	
October 27		Richmond	Maher Field; Roanoke, VA	T 13–13		
November 3		Hampden–Sydney	Maher Field; Roanoke, VA	W 12–0		
November 12	2:30 p.m.	vs. William & Mary	Tate Field; Richmond, VA	L 6–32	4,000	
November 17		Randolph–Macon	College Field; Salem, VA	W 26–6		
November 24		Lynchburg	College Field; Salem, VA	W 6–0		
*Non-conference game; All times are in Eastern time
