= Gerald Snyder =

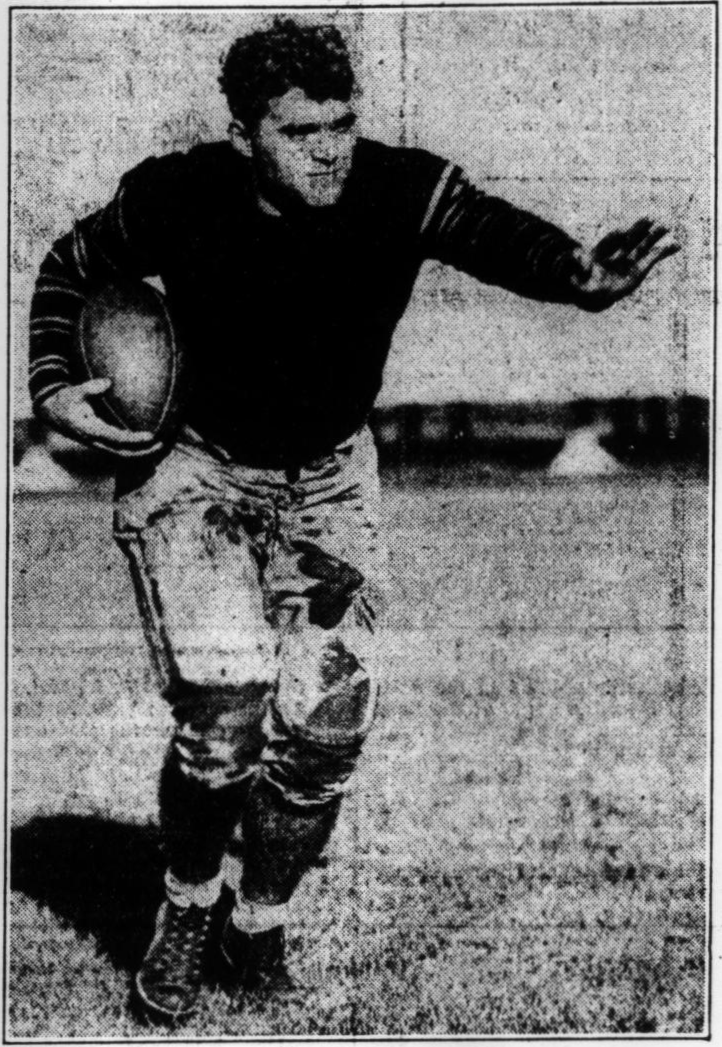
- Snyder in 1928

Profile
- Position: Running back

Personal information
- Born: August 6, 1905; Windber, Pennsylvania, U.S.
- Died: June 28, 1983 (aged 77)
- Listed height: 5 ft 8 in (1.73 m)
- Listed weight: 190 lb (86 kg)

Career information
- College: Maryland

Career history
- New York Giants (1929); Staten Island Stapletons (1930)

Awards and highlights
- Third-team All-American (1928); First-team All-Southern (1928); Maryland Athletics Hall of Fame

Gerald Theodore "Snitz" Snyder (August 6, 1905 – June 28, 1983) was an American football player and Army officer. He played college football as a back for the Maryland Terrapins at the University of Maryland. Snyder played professionally for two seasons in the National Football League (NFL).

== Biography ==
Snyder was born on August 6, 1905, in Windber, Pennsylvania, and attended high school at the Bellefonte Academy in Bellefonte, Pennsylvania. He attended college at the University of Maryland, where he played football and lacrosse. In Tales from the Maryland Terrapins, author David Ungrady credits Snyder with popularizing the fake reverse. In 1927, Snyder scored Maryland's only touchdown against Yale on a 90-yard punt return, which was the "longest run ever made in the Yale Bowl" at the time. In his senior year in 1928, Snyder was expected to be elected team captain, but had been suspended for off-field behavior by head coach Curley Byrd. Byrd believed the captaincy had become a popularity contest and elected instead to name game captains, a practice which continued for the next 15 years. That season, Snyder was named a second-team All-American in football by the Associated Press, and became just the second Maryland player to be honored as such.

In 1929, Snyder went on to play professional football in the NFL. He first played for the New York Giants, where he saw action in 12 games, including two starts, and he rushed for two touchdowns and caught one touchdown reception. In 1930, he played 11 games for the Staten Island Stapletons, including seven starts.

In 1931, Snyder received an M.A. from the University of Maryland. In 1933, he served as an assistant coach with the professional football franchise, the Frankford Legion. Snyder served in the United States Army in the Second World War and Korean War, and attained the rank of major. He died on June 28, 1983, and is interred at Arlington National Cemetery in Arlington, Virginia. In 1984, Snyder was posthumously inducted into the University of Maryland Athletic Hall of Fame.
