= Lambeth Field =

Stadium in Charlottesville, Virginia

Coordinates: 38.041056°N 78.503143°W

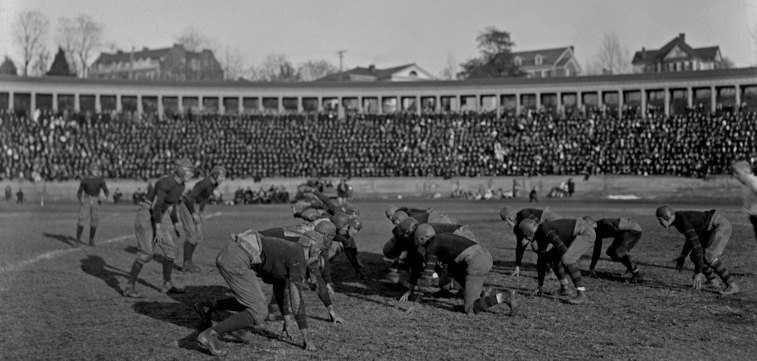
- Vanderbilt-Virginia football game at Lambeth Field, 1919.
- Interactive map of Lambeth Field
- Owner: University of Virginia

Construction
- Opened: 1913
- Closed: 1930

Lambeth Field or "The Colonnades" was a college football, baseball, and track stadium for the University of Virginia, named for W. A. Lambeth.
