= 1928 Western Maryland Green Terror football team =

American college football season

1928 Western Maryland Green Terror football
- Conference: Independent
- Record: 6–2–1
- Head coach: Dick Harlow (3rd season)
- Captain: Orville W. "Greasy" Neal
- Home stadium: Hoffa Field

1928 Southern college football independents records
	Conf.			Overall
Team	W	L	T	W		L		T
Georgetown		–		8	–	2	–	0
West Virginia		–		8	–	2	–	0
Howard		–		6	–	1	–	2
Loyola (LA)		–		7	–	3	–	0
Navy		–		5	–	3	–	1
East Tennessee State Teachers		–		4	–	3	–	0
Delaware State		–		1	–	1	–	1
Duke		–		5	–	5	–	0
Georgia Normal		–		5	–	5	–	0
Miami (FL)		–		4	–	4	–	1
Texas A&I		–		4	–	4	–	0
Texas Tech		–		4	–	4	–	1
Catholic University		–		4	–	5	–	0
Mississippi State Teachers		–		4	–	5	–	0
Middle Tennessee State Teachers		–		3	–	4	–	1
Texas Mines		–		3	–	4	–	1
Wesley		–		3	–	4	–	0
Appalachian State		–		3	–	6	–	0
Delaware		–		2	–	6	–	0
Wake Forest		–		2	–	6	–	2
Davidson		–		2	–	8	–	0
George Washington		–		1	–	7	–	0

The 1928 Western Maryland Green Terror football team was an American football team that represented Western Maryland College (now known as McDaniel College) as an independent during the 1928 college football season. In its third season under head coach Dick Harlow, the team compiled a 6–2–1 record and shut out seven of its nine opponents. Left halfback Orville W. "Greasy" Neal was the team captain and leader on offense. Western Maryland played home games at Hoffa Field on Westminster, Maryland.

Harlow served nine years as Western Maryland's head football coach. During those years, the school's football team compiled a 60–13–7 record. He was later inducted into the College Football Hall of Fame.

The team played two home games at Hoffa Field in Westminster, Maryland.

== Schedule ==
Date	Opponent	Site	Result	Attendance	Source
October 6	Dickinson	Hoffa Field; Westminster, MD	W 14–0	3,000	
October 13	at Temple	Temple Stadium; Philadelphia, PA	L 0–7	25,000	
October 20	at Maryland	Byrd Stadium; College Park, MD	L 6–13		
October 27	at Schuylkill	Reading, PA	W 19–0		
November 3	vs. Loyola (MD)	Baltimore Stadium; Baltimore, MD	W 69–0		
November 10	Mount St. Mary's	Hoffa Field; Westminster, MD	W 21–0		
November 17	at Gettysburg	Memorial Field; Gettysburg, PA	T 19–19		
November 24	at Saint Francis (PA)	Altoona, PA	W 18–0		
November 29	at Muhlenberg	Muhlenberg Field; Allentown, PA	W 59–0		
