= John B. McAuliffe =

American football player and coach

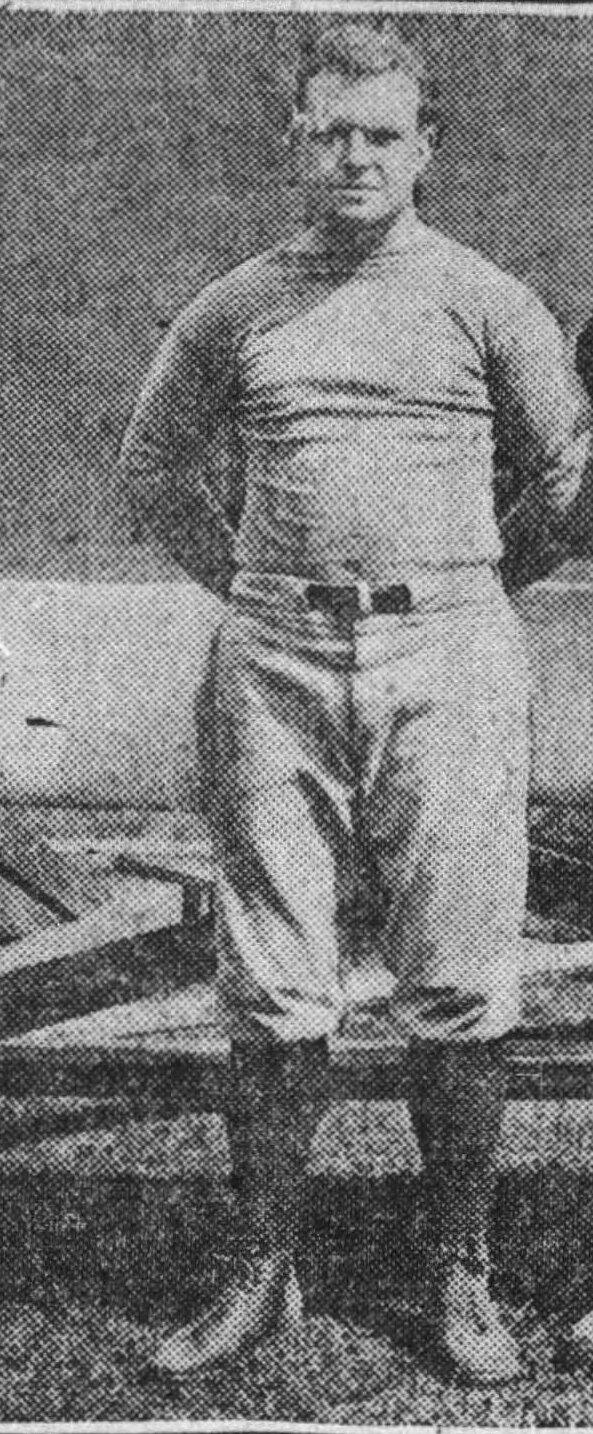
- McAuliffe, Dartmouth College football's line coach in 1923

Biographical details
- Born: October 16, 1892; Worcester, Massachusetts, U.S.
- Died: October 30, 1954 (aged 62); Worcester, Massachusetts, U.S.

Playing career
- 1913–1915: Dartmouth
- Position: Tackle

Coaching career (HC unless noted)
- 1916: Marquette
- 1917–1918: Marquette (assistant)
- 1920–1921: Colby
- 1922–1924: Dartmouth (line)
- 1925–1929: Catholic University

Administrative career (AD unless noted)
- ?–1930: Catholic University

Head coaching record
- Overall: 27–32–3

Accomplishments and honors

Awards
- All-American, 1915

John Boyle McAuliffe (October 16, 1892 – October 30, 1954) was an American college football player and coach. He served as the head football coach at Marquette University in 1916, at Colby College from 1920 to 1921, and at Catholic University from 1925 to 1929.

== Early life ==
McAuliffe was born in Worcester, Massachusetts on October 16, 1892, to Timothy J. and Anne (Boyle) McAuliffe. His father was a noted stone carver. McAuliffe attended the Worcester Academy and enrolled in Dartmouth College in 1912.

== Playing career ==
McAuliffe played college football at Dartmouth from 1913 to 1915 under head coach Frank Cavanaugh. He was the captain of the team in 1915. That season, McAuliffe was a second team selection by Walter Eckersall of the Chicago Tribune to the All-America Team. After graduating, McAuliffe joined the United States Navy and remained there for the duration of World War I. He spent part of his time in the Navy a gunnery instructor at Harvard College.

== Coaching career ==
McAuliffe was the 11th head football coach at Marquette University in Milwaukee, Wisconsin and he held that position for the 1916 season. His coaching record at Marquette was 4–3–1. He continued on at Marquette as an assistant to John J. Ryan in 1917 and 1918. After serving as line coach at his alma mater, Dartmouth, in 1924 under head coach Jesse Hawley, McAuliffe was appointed as head football coach at Catholic University in June 1925. He was living in Fitchburg, Massachusetts at the time.

== Later life ==
McAuliffe was an Internal Revenue Service agent in Worcester for the final 21 years of his life. He died on October 30, 1954, at Worcester City Hospital after suffering a coronary thrombosis.

== Head coaching record ==
| Year | Team | Overall | Conference | Standing | Bowl/playoffs |
|---|---|---|---|---|---|
Marquette Blue and Gold (Independent) (1916)
| 1916 | Marquette | 4–3–1 | | | |
| Marquette: | | 4–3–1 | | | |
Colby Mules (Maine Intercollegiate Athletic Association) (1920–1921)
| 1920 | Colby | 2–3–1 | 1–2 | | |
| 1921 | Colby | 0–5–1 | 0–2–1 | | |
| Colby: | | 2–8–2 | 1–4–1 | | |
Catholic University Cardinals (Independent) (1925–1929)
| 1925 | Catholic University | 4–4 | | | |
| 1926 | Catholic University | 3–5 | | | |
| 1927 | Catholic University | 5–3 | | | |
| 1928 | Catholic University | 4–5 | | | |
| 1929 | Catholic University | 5–4 | | | |
| Catholic University: | | 21–21 | | | |
| Total: | | 27–32–3 | | | |
