= Hugh A. Woodle =

American college football coach and agriculturist (1902–1962)

Biographical details
- Born: December 30, 1902; Bennettsville, South Carolina, U.S.
- Died: January 14, 1962 (aged 59); Clemson, South Carolina, U.S.
- Education: Clemson (BS)

Coaching career (HC unless noted)
- 1927–1928: Georgia Normal

Head coaching record
- Overall: 11–6–1

Hughey Allen Woodle Sr. (December 30, 1902 – January 14, 1962) was an American college football coach and agriculturist. He served as the head football coach at Georgia Normal School—now known as Georgia Southern University–from 1927 to 1928, compiling a record of 11–6–1. Woodle later worked as a agronomist for the Clemson College Extension Office.

Woodle was a native of Marlboro County, South Carolina, attending public school in Greenwood, South Carolina. He graduated from Clemson College—now known as Clemson University—in 1923, and later attended the University of Michigan. Woodle worked as a county farm agent in Edgefield County, South Carolina, Aiken County, South Carolina, and Arkansas County, Arkansas. He also thought vocational agriculture at Woodruff High School in Woodruff, South Carolina. Woodle served as a captain in the United States Army during World War II. He died suddenly, on January 14, 1962, at his home in Clemson, South Carolina.

== Head coaching record ==
Year	Team	Overall	Conference	Standing	Bowl/playoffs
Georgia Normal Blue Tide (Independent) (1927–1928)
1927	Georgia Normal	6–1–1			
1928	Georgia Normal	5–5			
Georgia Normal:		11–6–1			
Total:		11–6–1			
