= William B. Saunders =

American sports coach and college athletics administrator (1896-1977)

Williams B. Saunders
Biographical details
- Born: August 23, 1896
- Died: August 14, 1977 (aged 80); Jackson, Mississippi, U.S.

Playing career

Football
- 1922: Mississippi A&M

Coaching career (HC unless noted)

Football
- 1926–1927: Tupelo HS (MS)
- 1928–1929: Mississippi State Teachers

Basketball
- 1928–1930: Mississippi State Teachers

Baseball
- 1929–1930: Mississippi State Teachers

Administrative career (AD unless noted)
- 1928–1949: Mississippi State Teachers / Mississippi Southern

Head coaching record
- Overall: 6–11–1 (college football); 12–13 (college basketball); 3–20 (college baseball)

William B. Saunders (September 23, 1896 – August 14, 1977) was an American football, basketball, and baseball coach and college athletics administrator. He played college football at Mississippi Agricultural & Mechanical College—now known as Mississippi State University—and is also said to have played at Auburn University and the Georgia Institute of Technology. Saunders served as the head football coach (1928–1929), head basketball coach (1928–1930) and head baseball coach (1929–1930) at Mississippi State Teachers College—now known as the University of Southern Mississippi.

Saunders was a native of Greenville, Mississippi. He died at the age of 80, on August 14, 1977, at Mississippi Baptist Medical Center in Jackson, Mississippi.

== Head coaching record ==
=== College football ===
Year	Team	Overall	Conference	Standing	Bowl/playoffs
Mississippi State Teachers Yellow Jackets (Independent) (1928–1929)
1928	Mississippi State Teachers	4–5			
1929	Mississippi State Teachers	2–6–1			
Mississippi State Teachers:		6–11–1			
Total:		6–11–1			
