= Graydon Eggers =

American football and basketball coach, professor

- Eggers pictured in The Rhododendron 1929, Appalachian State yearbook

Biographical details
- Born: October 13, 1902; Watauga County, North Carolina, U.S.
- Died: January 11, 1994 (aged 90); Crossnore, North Carolina, U.S.

Coaching career (HC unless noted)

Football
- 1928: Appalachian Normal

Basketball
- 1944–1945: Appalachian State

Head coaching record
- Overall: 3–6 (football); 6–13 (basketball)

Graydon Poe Eggers Sr. (October 13, 1903 – January 11, 1994) was an American college football and college basketball coach and professor of English. He was the first head football coach at Appalachian State Normal School–now known as Appalachian State University–located in Boone, North Carolina. He coached the team for one season, in 1928, compiling a record of 3–6. Eggers was also the head basketball coach at Appalachian State, for one season in 1944–45, tallying a mark of 6–13.

Eggers, a native of Watauga County, North Carolina, was a longtime English professor at Appalachian State University, serving there from 1927 to 1970. He obtained his Ph.D. in English from Duke University in 1935. His specialty was translating Middle English. In 1955 Eggers published a translation of The Owl and the Nightingale, a Middle English poem. In 1971 Appalachian State University dedicated Eggers Residential Hall to Eggers and his brother, Herman Eggers.

== Head coaching record ==
=== Football ===
Year	Team	Overall	Conference	Standing	Bowl/playoffs
Appalachian Normal (Independent) (1928)
1928	Appalachian Normal	3–6			
Appalachian Normal:		3–6			
Total:		3–6			
