= 1928 West Virginia Wesleyan Bobcats football team =

American college football season

1928 West Virginia Wesleyan Bobcats football
- Conference: West Virginia Athletic Conference
- Record: 5–6 (3–2 WVAC)
- Head coach: Cebe Ross (4th season)

1928 West Virginia Athletic Conference football standings
	Conf.					Overall
Team	W		L		T	W		L		T
Marshall $	5	–	0	–	0	8	–	1	–	1
Potomac State	4	–	0	–	1	5	–	1	–	1
New River State	5	–	1	–	1	5	–	1	–	1
Salem	4	–	2	–	0	5	–	3	–	0
West Virginia Wesleyan	3	–	2	–	0	5	–	6	–	0
Concord	4	–	3	–	0	4	–	3	–	1
Glenville State	3	–	3	–	1	4	–	3	–	1
Broaddus	2	–	6	–	0	2	–	8	–	0
Alderson	1	–	4	–	0	1	–	6	–	0
Fairmont State	1	–	5	–	1	1	–	5	–	1
Morris Harvey	1	–	6	–	0	2	–	9	–	0
Davis & Elkins *	3	–	0	–	0	7	–	2	–	1
Bethany (WV) *	1	–	2	–	0	1	–	6	–	1
Shepherd *	0	–	2	–	0	4	–	4	–	0
$ – Conference champion; * – Did not qualify for conference standings Ties did not count in conference standings.

The 1928 West Virginia Wesleyan Bobcats football team represented West Virginia Wesleyan College as a member of the West Virginia Athletic Conference (WVAC) during the 1928 college football season. Led by fourth-year head coach Cebe Ross, the Bobcats compiled an overall record of 5–6 with a mark of 3–2 in conference play, placing fifth in the WVAC.

== Schedule ==
Date	Time	Opponent	Site	Result	Attendance	Source
September 21		Fairmont State	Buckhannon, WV	W 43–0		
September 29		at West Virginia*	Mountaineer Field; Morgantown, WV	L 0–12	6,500	
October 6		at NYU*	Ohio Field; Bronx, NY	L 7–26	17,500	
October 13	2:30 p.m.	vs. Concord	Beckley, WV	W 18–0		
October 20		at Georgetown*	Griffith Stadium; Washington, DC	L 7–34	3,500	
October 27		Waynesburg*	Buckhannon, WV	W 34–0		
November 3		at Navy*	Thompson Stadium; Annapolis, MD	L 0–37		
November 12		vs. Salem	Clarksburg, WV	W 12–0		
November 17		Davis & Elkins^{†}	Wesleyan Field; Buckhannon, WV	L 7–14		
November 24		at St. Xavier*	Corcoran Field; Cincinnati, OH	W 19–7	7,000	
November 29		at Marshall	Fairfield Stadium; Huntington, WV	L 7–13		
*Non-conference game; ^{†}Homecoming; All times are in Eastern time
