= 1928 Marshall Thundering Herd football team =

American college football season

1928 Marshall Thundering Herd football

WVAC champion
- Conference: West Virginia Athletic Conference
- Record: 8–1–1 (5–0 WVAC)
- Head coach: Charles Tallman (4th season)
- Captains: Ralph Young; Frank Porter
- Home stadium: Fairfield Stadium

1928 West Virginia Athletic Conference football standings
| | Conf. | | | | | Overall |
| Team | W | | L | | T | W | | L | | T |
|---|---|---|---|---|---|---|---|---|---|---|
| Marshall $ | 5 | – | 0 | – | 0 | 8 | – | 1 | – | 1 |
| Potomac State | 4 | – | 0 | – | 1 | 5 | – | 1 | – | 1 |
| New River State | 5 | – | 1 | – | 1 | 5 | – | 1 | – | 1 |
| Salem | 4 | – | 2 | – | 0 | 5 | – | 3 | – | 0 |
| West Virginia Wesleyan | 3 | – | 2 | – | 0 | 5 | – | 6 | – | 0 |
| Concord | 4 | – | 3 | – | 0 | 4 | – | 3 | – | 1 |
| Glenville State | 3 | – | 3 | – | 1 | 4 | – | 3 | – | 1 |
| Broaddus | 2 | – | 6 | – | 0 | 2 | – | 8 | – | 0 |
| Alderson | 1 | – | 4 | – | 0 | 1 | – | 6 | – | 0 |
| Fairmont State | 1 | – | 5 | – | 1 | 1 | – | 5 | – | 1 |
| Morris Harvey | 1 | – | 6 | – | 0 | 2 | – | 9 | – | 0 |
| Davis & Elkins * | 3 | – | 0 | – | 0 | 7 | – | 2 | – | 1 |
| Bethany (WV) * | 1 | – | 2 | – | 0 | 1 | – | 6 | – | 1 |
| Shepherd * | 0 | – | 2 | – | 0 | 4 | – | 4 | – | 0 |
$ – Conference champion; * – Did not qualify for conference standings Ties did not count in conference standings.

The 1928 Marshall Thundering Herd football team was an American football team that represented Marshall College (now Marshall University) in the West Virginia Athletic Conference during the 1928 college football season. In its fourth season under head coach Charles Tallman, the team compiled a 8–1–1 record, 5–0 against conference opponents, won the WVAC championship, and outscored opponents by a total of 175 to 33.

== Schedule ==
| Date | Opponent | Site | Result | Attendance | Source |
|---|---|---|---|---|---|
| September 30 | at William & Mary* | Williamsburg, VA | T 0–0 | | |
| October 6 | Fairmont State | Fairfield Stadium; Huntington, WV | W 27–0 | | |
| October 13 | vs. Morehead State* | Ashland, KY | W 26–0 | | |
| October 20 | at Wittenberg* | Springfield, OH | W 6–0 | | |
| October 26 | Morris Harvey | Fairfield Stadium; Huntington, WV | W 45–0 | | |
| November 3 | Centre* | Fairfield Stadium; Huntington, WV | L 6–20 | | |
| November 9 | at New River State | Montgomery, WV | W 13–0 | | |
| November 17 | Bethany (WV) | Fairfield Stadium; Huntington, WV | W 26–6 | | |
| November 24 | at Louisville* | Parkway Field; Louisville, KY | W 13–0 | | |
| November 29 | West Virginia Wesleyan^{†} | Fairfield Stadium; Huntington, WV | W 13–7 | | |
*Non-conference game; ^{†}Homecoming
