= 1928 Davidson Wildcats football team =

American college football season

1928 Davidson Wildcats football
- Conference: Independent
- Record: 2–8
- Head coach: William L. Younger (6th season)
- Home stadium: Richardson Field

1928 Southern college football independents records
	Conf.			Overall
Team	W	L	T	W		L		T
Georgetown		–		8	–	2	–	0
West Virginia		–		8	–	2	–	0
Howard		–		6	–	1	–	2
Loyola (LA)		–		7	–	3	–	0
Navy		–		5	–	3	–	1
East Tennessee State Teachers		–		4	–	3	–	0
Delaware State		–		1	–	1	–	1
Duke		–		5	–	5	–	0
Georgia Normal		–		5	–	5	–	0
Miami (FL)		–		4	–	4	–	1
Texas A&I		–		4	–	4	–	0
Texas Tech		–		4	–	4	–	1
Catholic University		–		4	–	5	–	0
Mississippi State Teachers		–		4	–	5	–	0
Middle Tennessee State Teachers		–		3	–	4	–	1
Texas Mines		–		3	–	4	–	1
Wesley		–		3	–	4	–	0
Appalachian State		–		3	–	6	–	0
Delaware		–		2	–	6	–	0
Wake Forest		–		2	–	6	–	2
Davidson		–		2	–	8	–	0
George Washington		–		1	–	7	–	0

The 1928 Davidson Wildcats football team was an American football team that represented Davidson College as an independent during the 1928 college football season. In their sixth year under head coach William L. Younger, the team compiled a 2–8 record.

== Schedule ==
Date	Opponent	Site	Result	Attendance	Source
September 22	Guilford	Richardson Field; Davidson, NC	W 27–0		
September 29	at Clemson	Riggs Field; Calhoun, SC	L 0–6		
October 6	Elon	Richardson Field; Davidson, NC	W 52–0		
October 13	Wofford	Richardson Field; Davidson, NC	L 0–7		
October 20	at The Citadel	Johnson Hagood Stadium; Charleston, SC	L 12–26		
October 27	vs. Wake Forest	Wearn Field; Charlotte, NC	L 6–25		
November 3	at VMI	Alumni Field; Lexington, VA	L 0–13		
November 10	vs. NC State	World War Memorial Stadium; Greensboro, NC	L 7–14	7,000	
November 17	North Carolina^{†}	Richardson Field; Davidson, NC	L 7–30	7,000	
November 29	at Duke	Hanes Field; Durham, NC	L 0–33	8,000	
^{†}Homecoming
