= 1928 Wake Forest Demon Deacons football team =

American college football season

1928 Wake Forest Demon Deacons football
- Conference: Independent
- Record: 2–6–2
- Head coach: Stan Cofall (1st season)
- Captain: Hal Weir
- Home stadium: Gore Field

1928 Southern college football independents records
	Conf.			Overall
Team	W	L	T	W		L		T
Georgetown		–		8	–	2	–	0
West Virginia		–		8	–	2	–	0
Howard		–		6	–	1	–	2
Loyola (LA)		–		7	–	3	–	0
Navy		–		5	–	3	–	1
East Tennessee State Teachers		–		4	–	3	–	0
Delaware State		–		1	–	1	–	1
Duke		–		5	–	5	–	0
Georgia Normal		–		5	–	5	–	0
Miami (FL)		–		4	–	4	–	1
Texas A&I		–		4	–	4	–	0
Texas Tech		–		4	–	4	–	1
Catholic University		–		4	–	5	–	0
Mississippi State Teachers		–		4	–	5	–	0
Middle Tennessee State Teachers		–		3	–	4	–	1
Texas Mines		–		3	–	4	–	1
Wesley		–		3	–	4	–	0
Appalachian State		–		3	–	6	–	0
Delaware		–		2	–	6	–	0
Wake Forest		–		2	–	6	–	2
Davidson		–		2	–	8	–	0
George Washington		–		1	–	7	–	0

The 1928 Wake Forest Demon Deacons football team was an American football team that represented Wake Forest College (now known as Wake Forest University) during the 1928 college football season. In its first and only season under head coach Stan Cofall, the team compiled a 2–6–2 record.

== Schedule ==
Date	Opponent	Site	Result	Attendance	Source
September 29	at North Carolina	Kenan Memorial Stadium; Chapel Hill, NC (rivalry)	L 0–65	15,000	
October 6	Presbyterian	Gore Field; Wake Forest, NC	L 7–12		
October 13	at William & Mary	Cary Field; Williamsburg, VA	T 0–0		
October 18	at NC State	Riddick Stadium; Raleigh, NC (rivalry)	L 0–37		
October 27	vs. Davidson	Wearn Field; Charlotte, NC	W 25–6		
November 3	vs. Furman	Wearn Field; Charlotte, NC	L 0–18	5,000	
November 10	at Duke	Hanes Field; Durham, NC (rivalry)	L 0–38		
November 16	Wofford	Gore Field; Wake Forest, NC	T 7–7		
November 29	vs. Mercer	Memorial Stadium; Asheville, NC	L 12–14	4,000	
December 25	at Miami (FL)	University Stadium; Coral Gables, FL	W 13–6		
