= 1928 Duke Blue Devils football team =

American college football season

1928 Duke Blue Devils football
- Conference: Independent
- Record: 5–5
- Head coach: Jimmy DeHart (3rd season)
- Captain: Roy Hunter
- Home stadium: Hanes Field

1928 Southern college football independents records
	Conf.			Overall
Team	W	L	T	W		L		T
Georgetown		–		8	–	2	–	0
West Virginia		–		8	–	2	–	0
Howard		–		6	–	1	–	2
Loyola (LA)		–		7	–	3	–	0
Navy		–		5	–	3	–	1
East Tennessee State Teachers		–		4	–	3	–	0
Delaware State		–		1	–	1	–	1
Duke		–		5	–	5	–	0
Georgia Normal		–		5	–	5	–	0
Miami (FL)		–		4	–	4	–	1
Texas A&I		–		4	–	4	–	0
Texas Tech		–		4	–	4	–	1
Catholic University		–		4	–	5	–	0
Mississippi State Teachers		–		4	–	5	–	0
Middle Tennessee State Teachers		–		3	–	4	–	1
Texas Mines		–		3	–	4	–	1
Wesley		–		3	–	4	–	0
Appalachian State		–		3	–	6	–	0
Delaware		–		2	–	6	–	0
Wake Forest		–		2	–	6	–	2
Davidson		–		2	–	8	–	0
George Washington		–		1	–	7	–	0

The 1928 Duke Blue Devils football team was an American football team that represented Duke University as an independent during the 1928 college football season. In its third season under head coach Jimmy DeHart, the team compiled a 5–5 record and outscored opponents by a total of 155 to 116. Roy Hunter was the team captain.

== Schedule ==
Date	Time	Opponent	Site	Result	Attendance	Source
September 29		at Furman	Manly Field; Greenville, SC	L 0–6		
October 6		South Dakota^{†}	Hanes Field; Durham, NC	W 25–6		
October 12	2:00 p.m.	at Boston College	Fenway Park; Boston, MA	L 0–19	20,000	
October 20		at Navy	Thompson Stadium; Annapolis, MD	L 0–6	1,000	
October 27		at Georgetown	Griffith Stadium; Washington, DC	L 0–35		
November 3		Mercer	Hanes Field; Durham, NC	W 38–18		
November 10		Wake Forest	Hanes Field; Durham, NC (rivalry)	W 38–0		
November 17		at NC State	Riddick Stadium; Raleigh, NC (rivalry)	W 14–12		
November 24		Davidson	Hanes Field; Durham, NC	W 33–0	8,000	
December 8		at North Carolina	Kenan Memorial Stadium; Chapel Hill, NC (rivalry)	L 7–14		
^{†}Homecoming
