= 1928 West Virginia Mountaineers football team =

American college football season

1928 West Virginia Mountaineers football
- Conference: Independent
- Record: 8–2
- Head coach: Ira Rodgers (4th season)
- Captain: Clarence Keefer
- Home stadium: Mountaineer Field

1928 Southern college football independents records
	Conf.			Overall
Team	W	L	T	W		L		T
Georgetown		–		8	–	2	–	0
West Virginia		–		8	–	2	–	0
Howard		–		6	–	1	–	2
Loyola (LA)		–		7	–	3	–	0
Navy		–		5	–	3	–	1
East Tennessee State Teachers		–		4	–	3	–	0
Delaware State		–		1	–	1	–	1
Duke		–		5	–	5	–	0
Georgia Normal		–		5	–	5	–	0
Miami (FL)		–		4	–	4	–	1
Texas A&I		–		4	–	4	–	0
Texas Tech		–		4	–	4	–	1
Catholic University		–		4	–	5	–	0
Mississippi State Teachers		–		4	–	5	–	0
Middle Tennessee State Teachers		–		3	–	4	–	1
Texas Mines		–		3	–	4	–	1
Wesley		–		3	–	4	–	0
Appalachian State		–		3	–	6	–	0
Delaware		–		2	–	6	–	0
Wake Forest		–		2	–	6	–	2
Davidson		–		2	–	8	–	0
George Washington		–		1	–	7	–	0

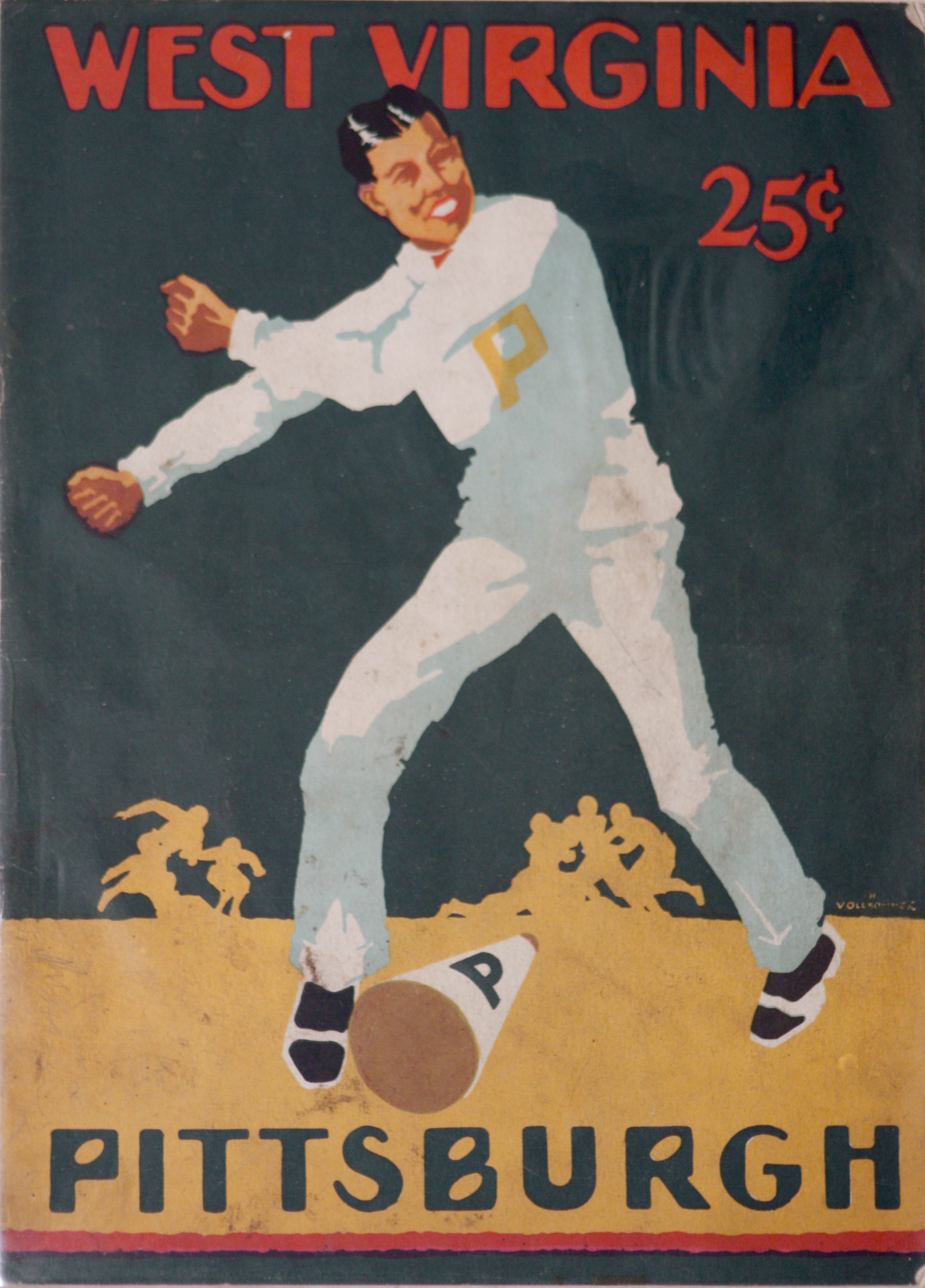
1928 Official Souvenir Football Program for Pitt versus West Virginia game.

The 1928 West Virginia Mountaineers football team was an American football team that represented West Virginia University as an independent during the 1928 college football season. In its fourth season under head coach Ira Rodgers, the team compiled an 8–2 record and outscored opponents by a total of 152 to 38. The team played its home games at Mountaineer Field in Morgantown, West Virginia. Clarence Keefer was the team captain.

== Schedule ==
Date	Opponent	Site	Result	Attendance	Source
September 22	Davis & Elkins	Mountaineer Field; Morgantown, WV	L 0–7		
September 29	West Virginia Wesleyan	Mountaineer Field; Morgantown, WV	W 12–0	6,500	
October 6	vs. Haskell	Wheeling, WV	W 28–7	6,500	
October 13	at Pittsburgh	Pitt Stadium; Pittsburgh, PA (rivalry)	W 9–6	25,000	
October 20	vs. Washington and Lee	Laidley Field; Charleston, WV	W 22–0		
October 27	at Lafayette	Fisher Field; Easton, PA	W 17–0		
November 6	at Fordham	Yankee Stadium; Bronx, NY	W 18–0	25,000	
November 10	Oklahoma A&M	Mountaineer Field; Morgantown, WV	W 32–6	12,500	
November 17	at Georgetown	Griffith Stadium; Washington, DC	L 0–12		
November 29	Washington & Jefferson	Mountaineer Field; Morgantown, WV	W 14–0	19,000	
