= 1928 Appalachian Normal football team =

American college football season

1928 Appalachian Normal football
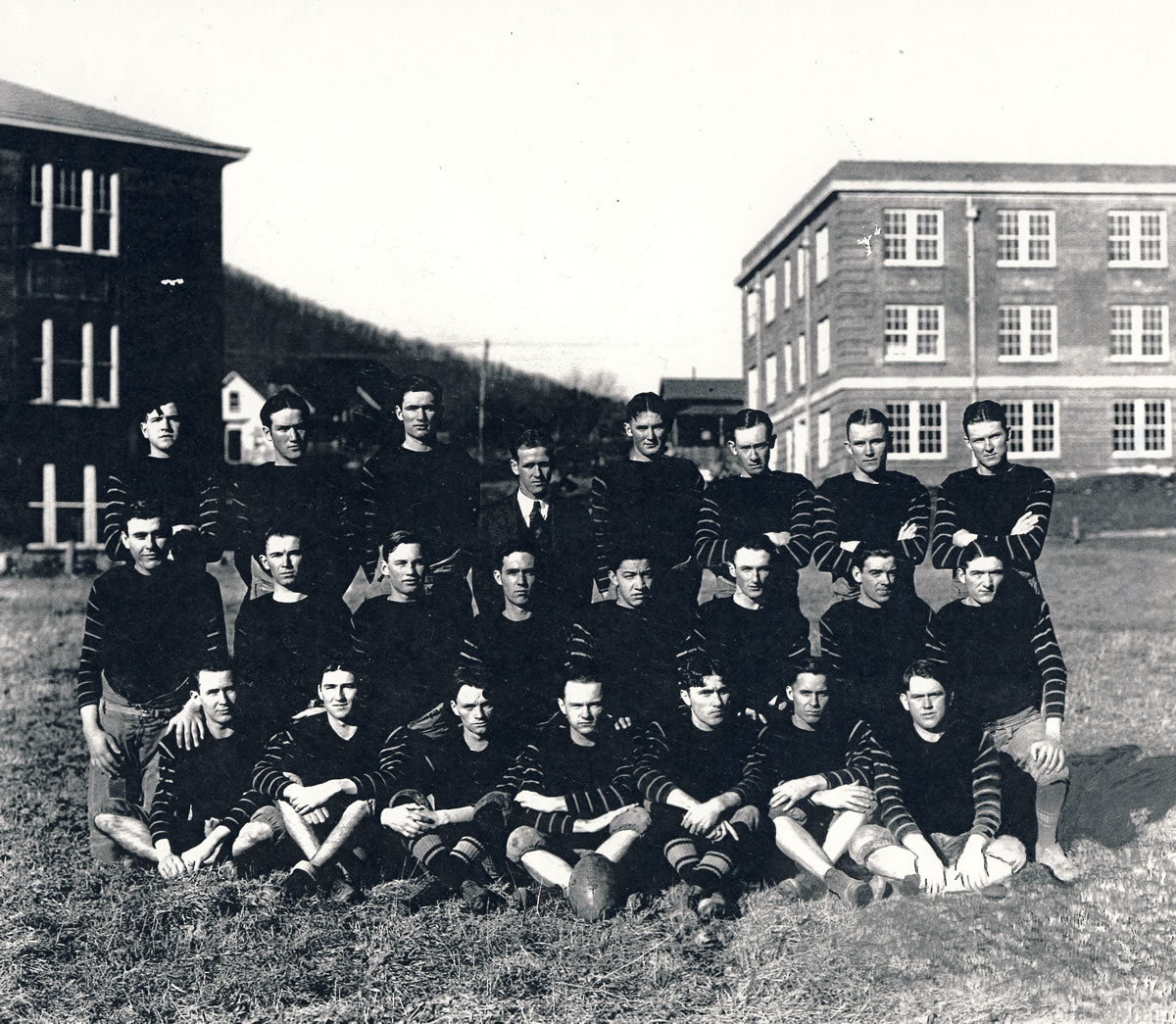
- Conference: Independent
- Record: 3–6
- Head coach: Graydon Eggers (1st season)
- Home stadium: College Field

1928 Southern college football independents records
	Conf.			Overall
Team	W	L	T	W		L		T
Georgetown		–		8	–	2	–	0
West Virginia		–		8	–	2	–	0
Howard		–		6	–	1	–	2
Loyola (LA)		–		7	–	3	–	0
Navy		–		5	–	3	–	1
East Tennessee State Teachers		–		4	–	3	–	0
Delaware State		–		1	–	1	–	1
Duke		–		5	–	5	–	0
Georgia Normal		–		5	–	5	–	0
Miami (FL)		–		4	–	4	–	1
Texas A&I		–		4	–	4	–	0
Texas Tech		–		4	–	4	–	1
Catholic University		–		4	–	5	–	0
Mississippi State Teachers		–		4	–	5	–	0
Middle Tennessee State Teachers		–		3	–	4	–	1
Texas Mines		–		3	–	4	–	1
Wesley		–		3	–	4	–	0
Appalachian State		–		3	–	6	–	0
Delaware		–		2	–	6	–	0
Wake Forest		–		2	–	6	–	2
Davidson		–		2	–	8	–	0
George Washington		–		1	–	7	–	0

The 1928 Appalachian Normal football team represented Appalachian State Normal School—now known as Appalachian State University—in the 1928 college football season. This was the first season that the school fielded a football team. Appalachian Normal was led by head coach Graydon Eggers and played their home games at College Field in Boone, North Carolina.

== Schedule ==
Date	Time	Opponent	Site	Result	Source
September 29		at Mountain City	Mountain City, TN	L 0–26	
October 6		at Wilkesboro	Wilkesboro, NC	W 6–0	
October 13		Morganton	College Field; Boone, NC	L 0–7	
October 20	3:30 p.m.	at East Tennessee Teachers	Johnson City, TN	L 6–9	
October 27		Rutherford	College Field; Boone, NC	L 6–50	
November 3		Lees–McRae	College Field; Boone, NC	W 52–0	
November 9		at Bluefield	Bluefield, VA	L 0–44	
November 17		Mt. Park	College Field; Boone, NC	W 52–0	
November 24		at Belmont Abbey	Belmont, NC	L 0–13	
All times are in Eastern time
