= 1928 Georgetown Hoyas football team =

American college football season

1928 Georgetown Hoyas football
- Conference: Independent
- Record: 8–2
- Head coach: Lou Little (5th season)
- Captain: Jerry Carroll
- Home stadium: Griffith Stadium

1928 Southern college football independents records
	Conf.			Overall
Team	W	L	T	W		L		T
Georgetown		–		8	–	2	–	0
West Virginia		–		8	–	2	–	0
Howard		–		6	–	1	–	2
Loyola (LA)		–		7	–	3	–	0
Navy		–		5	–	3	–	1
East Tennessee State Teachers		–		4	–	3	–	0
Delaware State		–		1	–	1	–	1
Duke		–		5	–	5	–	0
Georgia Normal		–		5	–	5	–	0
Miami (FL)		–		4	–	4	–	1
Texas A&I		–		4	–	4	–	0
Texas Tech		–		4	–	4	–	1
Catholic University		–		4	–	5	–	0
Mississippi State Teachers		–		4	–	5	–	0
Middle Tennessee State Teachers		–		3	–	4	–	1
Texas Mines		–		3	–	4	–	1
Wesley		–		3	–	4	–	0
Appalachian State		–		3	–	6	–	0
Delaware		–		2	–	6	–	0
Wake Forest		–		2	–	6	–	2
Davidson		–		2	–	8	–	0
George Washington		–		1	–	7	–	0

The 1928 Georgetown Hoyas football team represented Georgetown University as an independent during the 1928 college football season. Led by Lou Little in his fifth season as head coach, the team went 8–2.

== Schedule ==
Date	Opponent	Site	Result	Attendance	Source
September 29	Mount St. Mary's	Griffith Stadium; Washington, DC	W 31–0		
October 6	Susquehanna	Griffith Stadium; Washington, DC	W 88–0		
October 13	Lebanon Valley	Griffith Stadium; Washington, DC	W 52–0		
October 20	West Virginia Wesleyan	Griffith Stadium; Washington, DC	W 34–7	3,500	
October 27	Duke	Griffith Stadium; Washington, DC	W 35–0		
November 3	at NYU	Yankee Stadium; Bronx, NY	W 7–2	50,000	
November 10	vs. Carnegie Tech	Chadwick Field; Albany, NY	L 0–13	2,000	
November 17	West Virginia	Griffith Stadium; Washington, DC	W 12–0		
November 24	at Fordham	Polo Grounds; New York, NY	W 27–7	20,000	
November 29	at Detroit	Dinan Field; Detroit, MI	L 13–33	30,000	
