= 1928 Loyola Wolf Pack football team =

American college football season

1928 Loyola Wolf Pack football
- Conference: Independent
- Record: 7–3
- Head coach: Clark Shaughnessy (2nd season)
- Home stadium: Loyola University Stadium

1928 Southern college football independents records
	Conf.			Overall
Team	W	L	T	W		L		T
Georgetown		–		8	–	2	–	0
West Virginia		–		8	–	2	–	0
Howard		–		6	–	1	–	2
Loyola (LA)		–		7	–	3	–	0
Navy		–		5	–	3	–	1
East Tennessee State Teachers		–		4	–	3	–	0
Delaware State		–		1	–	1	–	1
Duke		–		5	–	5	–	0
Georgia Normal		–		5	–	5	–	0
Miami (FL)		–		4	–	4	–	1
Texas A&I		–		4	–	4	–	0
Texas Tech		–		4	–	4	–	1
Catholic University		–		4	–	5	–	0
Mississippi State Teachers		–		4	–	5	–	0
Middle Tennessee State Teachers		–		3	–	4	–	1
Texas Mines		–		3	–	4	–	1
Wesley		–		3	–	4	–	0
Appalachian State		–		3	–	6	–	0
Delaware		–		2	–	6	–	0
Wake Forest		–		2	–	6	–	2
Davidson		–		2	–	8	–	0
George Washington		–		1	–	7	–	0

The 1928 Loyola Wolf Pack football team was an American football team that represented Loyola College of New Orleans (now known as Loyola University New Orleans) as an independent during the 1928 college football season. In its second season under head coach Clark Shaughnessy, the team compiled a 7–3 record and outscored opponents by a total of 220 to 85. The team played its home games at Loyola University Stadium in New Orleans.

== Schedule ==
Date	Opponent	Site	Result	Attendance	Source
September 22	Howard (AL)	Loyola Stadium; New Orleans, LA	W 18–0		
September 29	at Notre Dame	Cartier Field; South Bend, IN	L 6–12	13,000	
October 13	at Oglethorpe	Hermance Field; North Atlanta, GA	W 33–6		
October 20	at Detroit	Dinan Field; Detroit, MI	L 0–27		
October 27	Ole Miss	Loyola Stadium; New Orleans, LA	W 34–14		
November 3	St. Edward's (TX)	Loyola Stadium; New Orleans, LA	W 28–0	5,000	
November 10	Haskell	Loyola Stadium; New Orleans, LA	W 20–0		
November 24	Centenary	Loyola Stadium; New Orleans, LA	W 23–6		
November 29	at Spring Hill	Hartwell Field; Mobile, AL	W 45–6	5,000	
December 8	Quantico Marines	Loyola Stadium; New Orleans, LA	L 13–14		
