= 1928 Miami Hurricanes football team =

American college football season

1928 Miami Hurricanes football
- Conference: Independent
- Record: 4–4–1
- Head coach: Cub Buck (3rd season)
- Home stadium: University Stadium

1928 Southern college football independents records
	Conf.			Overall
Team	W	L	T	W		L		T
Georgetown		–		8	–	2	–	0
West Virginia		–		8	–	2	–	0
Howard		–		6	–	1	–	2
Loyola (LA)		–		7	–	3	–	0
Navy		–		5	–	3	–	1
East Tennessee State Teachers		–		4	–	3	–	0
Delaware State		–		1	–	1	–	1
Duke		–		5	–	5	–	0
Georgia Normal		–		5	–	5	–	0
Miami (FL)		–		4	–	4	–	1
Texas A&I		–		4	–	4	–	0
Texas Tech		–		4	–	4	–	1
Catholic University		–		4	–	5	–	0
Mississippi State Teachers		–		4	–	5	–	0
Middle Tennessee State Teachers		–		3	–	4	–	1
Texas Mines		–		3	–	4	–	1
Wesley		–		3	–	4	–	0
Appalachian State		–		3	–	6	–	0
Delaware		–		2	–	6	–	0
Wake Forest		–		2	–	6	–	2
Davidson		–		2	–	8	–	0
George Washington		–		1	–	7	–	0

The 1928 Miami Hurricanes football team was an American football team that represented the University of Miami as an independent during the 1928 college football season. In their third and final year under head coach Cub Buck, the team compiled a 4–4–1 record. Miami played their home games at University Stadium in Coral Gables, Florida.

== Schedule ==
Date	Time	Opponent	Site	Result	Source
October 27		Vedado Athletic Club	University Stadium; Coral Gables, FL	W 62–0	
November 3		Rollins	University Stadium; Coral Gables, FL	W 31–0	
November 10	3:00 p.m.	Elon	University Stadium; Coral Gables, FL	L 18–21	
November 17	3:00 p.m.	Stetson	University Stadium; Coral Gables, FL	L 6–15	
November 29		Howard (AL)	University Stadium; Coral Gables, FL	L 0–7	
December 8	3:00 p.m.	Louisiana College	University Stadium; Coral Gables, FL	W 20–0	
December 15		Union (TN)	University Stadium; Coral Gables, FL	W 7–6	
December 25		Wake Forest	University Stadium; Coral Gables, FL	L 6–13	
January 1		Southern College (FL)	University Stadium; Coral Gables, FL	T 13–13	
All times are in Eastern time
