= 1928 Navy Midshipmen football team =

American college football season

1928 Navy Midshipmen football
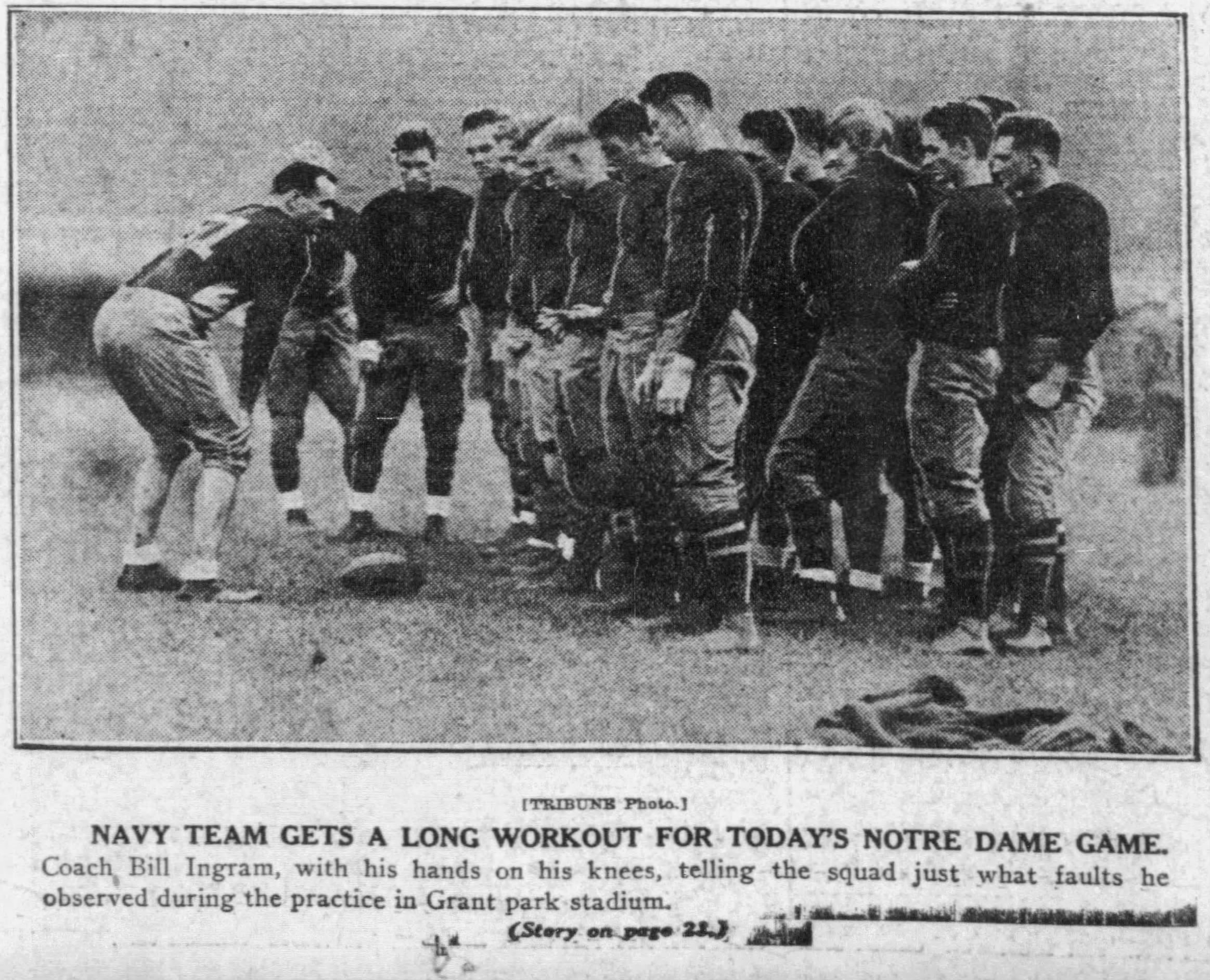
- Members of the Navy Midshipmen team, with coach Bill Ingram, practicing before a game against Notre Dame
- Conference: Independent
- Record: 5–3–1
- Head coach: Bill Ingram (3rd season)
- Captain: Ed Burke
- Home stadium: Thompson Stadium

1928 Southern college football independents records
	Conf.			Overall
Team	W	L	T	W		L		T
Georgetown		–		8	–	2	–	0
West Virginia		–		8	–	2	–	0
Howard		–		6	–	1	–	2
Loyola (LA)		–		7	–	3	–	0
Navy		–		5	–	3	–	1
East Tennessee State Teachers		–		4	–	3	–	0
Delaware State		–		1	–	1	–	1
Duke		–		5	–	5	–	0
Georgia Normal		–		5	–	5	–	0
Miami (FL)		–		4	–	4	–	1
Texas A&I		–		4	–	4	–	0
Texas Tech		–		4	–	4	–	1
Catholic University		–		4	–	5	–	0
Mississippi State Teachers		–		4	–	5	–	0
Middle Tennessee State Teachers		–		3	–	4	–	1
Texas Mines		–		3	–	4	–	1
Wesley		–		3	–	4	–	0
Appalachian State		–		3	–	6	–	0
Delaware		–		2	–	6	–	0
Wake Forest		–		2	–	6	–	2
Davidson		–		2	–	8	–	0
George Washington		–		1	–	7	–	0

The 1928 Navy Midshipmen football team represented the United States Naval Academy during the 1928 college football season. In their third season under head coach Bill Ingram, the Midshipmen compiled a 5–3–1 record, shut out five opponents, and outscored all opponents by a combined score of 121 to 21.

The annual Army–Navy Game was canceled due to disagreement over player eligibility standards.

== Schedule ==
Date	Opponent	Site	Result	Attendance	Source
September 29	Davis & Elkins	Thompson Stadium; Annapolis, MD	L 0–2		
October 6	Boston College	Thompson Stadium; Annapolis, MD	L 0–6		
October 13	vs. Notre Dame	Soldier Field; Chicago, IL (rivalry)	L 0–7	120,000	
October 20	Duke	Thompson Stadium; Annapolis, MD	W 6–0	1,000	
October 27	at Penn	Franklin Field; Philadelphia, PA	W 6–0	75,000	
November 3	West Virginia Wesleyan	Thompson Stadium; Annapolis, MD	W 37–0		
November 10	vs. Michigan	Municipal Stadium; Baltimore, MD	T 6–6	28,433	
November 17	Loyola (MD)	Thompson Stadium; Annapolis, MD	W 57–0		
November 24	vs. Princeton	Franklin Field; Philadelphia, PA	W 27–13		
