= 1928 Texas Mines Miners football team =

American college football season

1928 Texas Mines Miners football
- Conference: Independent
- Record: 3–4–1
- Head coach: E. J. Stewart (2nd season)

1928 Southern college football independents records
	Conf.			Overall
Team	W	L	T	W		L		T
Georgetown		–		8	–	2	–	0
West Virginia		–		8	–	2	–	0
Howard		–		6	–	1	–	2
Loyola (LA)		–		7	–	3	–	0
Navy		–		5	–	3	–	1
East Tennessee State Teachers		–		4	–	3	–	0
Delaware State		–		1	–	1	–	1
Duke		–		5	–	5	–	0
Georgia Normal		–		5	–	5	–	0
Miami (FL)		–		4	–	4	–	1
Texas A&I		–		4	–	4	–	0
Texas Tech		–		4	–	4	–	1
Catholic University		–		4	–	5	–	0
Mississippi State Teachers		–		4	–	5	–	0
Middle Tennessee State Teachers		–		3	–	4	–	1
Texas Mines		–		3	–	4	–	1
Wesley		–		3	–	4	–	0
Appalachian State		–		3	–	6	–	0
Delaware		–		2	–	6	–	0
Wake Forest		–		2	–	6	–	2
Davidson		–		2	–	8	–	0
George Washington		–		1	–	7	–	0

The 1928 Texas Mines Miners football team was an American football team that represented Texas School of Mines (now known as the University of Texas at El Paso) as an independent during the 1928 college football season. In its second season under head coach E. J. Stewart, the team compiled a 3–4–1 record and was outscored by a total of 103 to 100. The team won its annual rivalry game with New Mexico A&M by a 6-0 score.

== Schedule ==
Date	Opponent	Site	Result	Source
September 28	New Mexico State Teachers	El Paso High School Stadium; El Paso, TX	W 68–0	
October 6	Southwestern (TX)	El Paso High School Stadium; El Paso, TX	L 7–33	
October 15	Tempe State	El Paso High School Stadium; El Paso, TX	T 0–0	
October 27	Arizona	El Paso High School Stadium; El Paso, TX	L 6–12	
November 3	Sul Ross	El Paso High School Stadium; El Paso, TX	L 0–18	
November 9	New Mexico A&M	El Paso High School Stadium; El Paso, TX (rivalry)	W 6–0	
November 17	at New Mexico	University Field; Albuquerque, NM	L 0–33	
November 29	Simmons (TX)	El Paso High School Stadium; El Paso, TX	W 13–7	
