= 1928 Delaware Fightin' Blue Hens football team =

American college football season

1928 Delaware Fightin' Blue Hens football
- Conference: Independent
- Record: 2–6
- Head coach: Joseph J. Rothrock (2nd season)
- Home stadium: Frazer Field

1928 Southern college football independents records
	Conf.			Overall
Team	W	L	T	W		L		T
Georgetown		–		8	–	2	–	0
West Virginia		–		8	–	2	–	0
Howard		–		6	–	1	–	2
Loyola (LA)		–		7	–	3	–	0
Navy		–		5	–	3	–	1
East Tennessee State Teachers		–		4	–	3	–	0
Delaware State		–		1	–	1	–	1
Duke		–		5	–	5	–	0
Georgia Normal		–		5	–	5	–	0
Miami (FL)		–		4	–	4	–	1
Texas A&I		–		4	–	4	–	0
Texas Tech		–		4	–	4	–	1
Catholic University		–		4	–	5	–	0
Mississippi State Teachers		–		4	–	5	–	0
Middle Tennessee State Teachers		–		3	–	4	–	1
Texas Mines		–		3	–	4	–	1
Wesley		–		3	–	4	–	0
Appalachian State		–		3	–	6	–	0
Delaware		–		2	–	6	–	0
Wake Forest		–		2	–	6	–	2
Davidson		–		2	–	8	–	0
George Washington		–		1	–	7	–	0

The 1928 Delaware Fightin' Blue Hens football team was an American football team that represented the University of Delaware in the 1928 college football season. In their second season under head coach Joseph J. Rothrock, the Blue Hens compiled a 2–6 record and were outscored by a total of 144 to 44. The team played its home games at Frazer Field in Newark, Delaware.

== Schedule ==
Date	Opponent	Site	Result	Attendance	Source
October 6	Drexel	Frazer Field; Newark, DE	L 0–19		
October 13	Mount St. Mary's	Frazer Field; Newark, DE	L 0–31		
October 20	at Ursinus	Collegeville, PA	L 0–7		
October 27	at Rutgers	Neilson Field; New Brunswick, NJ	L 0–34		
November 3	at Swarthmore	Swarthmore, PA	L 0–20		
November 10	Gallaudet	Frazer Field; Newark, DE	W 25–0		
November 17	Saint Joseph's	Frazer Field; Newark, DE	L 0–26		
November 24	Haverford	Frazer Field; Newark, DE	W 19–7		
