= 1928 Mississippi State Teachers Yellow Jackets football team =

American college football season

1928 Mississippi State Teachers Yellow Jackets football
- Conference: Independent
- Record: 4–5
- Head coach: William B. Saunders (1st season)
- Home stadium: Kamper Park

1928 Southern college football independents records
	Conf.			Overall
Team	W	L	T	W		L		T
Georgetown		–		8	–	2	–	0
West Virginia		–		8	–	2	–	0
Howard		–		6	–	1	–	2
Loyola (LA)		–		7	–	3	–	0
Navy		–		5	–	3	–	1
East Tennessee State Teachers		–		4	–	3	–	0
Delaware State		–		1	–	1	–	1
Duke		–		5	–	5	–	0
Georgia Normal		–		5	–	5	–	0
Miami (FL)		–		4	–	4	–	1
Texas A&I		–		4	–	4	–	0
Texas Tech		–		4	–	4	–	1
Catholic University		–		4	–	5	–	0
Mississippi State Teachers		–		4	–	5	–	0
Middle Tennessee State Teachers		–		3	–	4	–	1
Texas Mines		–		3	–	4	–	1
Wesley		–		3	–	4	–	0
Appalachian State		–		3	–	6	–	0
Delaware		–		2	–	6	–	0
Wake Forest		–		2	–	6	–	2
Davidson		–		2	–	8	–	0
George Washington		–		1	–	7	–	0

The 1928 Mississippi State Teachers Yellow Jackets football team was an American football team that represented the Mississippi State Teachers College (now known as the University of Southern Mississippi) as an independent during the 1928 college football season. In their first year under head coach William B. Saunders, the team compiled a 4–5 record.

== Schedule ==
Date	Opponent	Site	Result	Source
September 29	at Mississippi College	Provine Field; Clinton, MS	L 0–83	
October 5	at Perkinston	Perkinston, MS	W 12–2	
October 13	Newton J.C.	Kamper Park; Hattiesburg, MS	W 7–0	
October 19	Pearl River	Kamper Park; Hattiesburg, MS	W 6–0	
October 26	at Southwestern Louisiana	S.L.I. Stadium; Lafayette, LA	L 7–37	
November 9	Mississippi College freshmen	Kamper Park; Hattiesburg, MS	W 12–6	
November 16	at Marion	Rowell Field; Selma, AL	L 6–53	
November 24	Copiah–Lincoln	Kamper Park; Hattiesburg, MS	L 6–13	
November 29	Clarke College (MS)	Kamper Park; Hattiesburg, MS	L 6–40	
