= 1928 Wesley Wildcats football team =

American college football season

1928 Wesley Wildcats football
- Conference: Independent
- Record: 3–4
- Head coach: Josh S. Faulkner (3rd season)
- Captain: Bill Melson

1928 Southern college football independents records
	Conf.			Overall
Team	W	L	T	W		L		T
Georgetown		–		8	–	2	–	0
West Virginia		–		8	–	2	–	0
Howard		–		6	–	1	–	2
Loyola (LA)		–		7	–	3	–	0
Navy		–		5	–	3	–	1
East Tennessee State Teachers		–		4	–	3	–	0
Delaware State		–		1	–	1	–	1
Duke		–		5	–	5	–	0
Georgia Normal		–		5	–	5	–	0
Miami (FL)		–		4	–	4	–	1
Texas A&I		–		4	–	4	–	0
Texas Tech		–		4	–	4	–	1
Catholic University		–		4	–	5	–	0
Mississippi State Teachers		–		4	–	5	–	0
Middle Tennessee State Teachers		–		3	–	4	–	1
Texas Mines		–		3	–	4	–	1
Wesley		–		3	–	4	–	0
Appalachian State		–		3	–	6	–	0
Delaware		–		2	–	6	–	0
Wake Forest		–		2	–	6	–	2
Davidson		–		2	–	8	–	0
George Washington		–		1	–	7	–	0

The 1928 Wesley Wildcats football team represented Wesley Collegiate Institute (later known as Wesley College) in the 1928 college football season as an independent. Led by coach Josh S. Faulkner his third and final year, the Wildcats compiled a 3–4 record. Bill Melson was team captain. Between October 26 and 27, Wesley scheduled four games, but had to cancel three due to date conflicts.

== Schedule ==
Date	Opponent	Site	Result	Source
October 6	at Tome School	Cecil County, MD	L 6–30	
October 12	Newark High School	Dover Baseball Park; Dover, DE	W 13–0	
October 19	Middletown High School		W 13–6 or 13–0	
October 20	at West Nottingham Academy	Colora, MD	Cancelled	
October 26	Dover High School	Dover Baseball Park; Dover, DE	Cancelled	
October 27	Seaford High School	Dover Baseball Park; Dover, DE	Cancelled	
October 27	Union Gardens AA	Dover Baseball Park; Dover, DE	Cancelled	
October 27	Silverbrook	Dover Baseball Park; Dover, DE	W 13–6	
November 9	at Wilmington High School	Wilmington, DE	L 7–21	
November 16	Goldey College	Dover Baseball Park; Dover, DE	L 0–12	
November 23	at Ridley Park Scholastics		L 6–26	
