= 1928 Georgia Normal Blue Tide football team =

American college football season

1928 Georgia Normal Blue Tide football
- Conference: Independent
- Record: 5–5
- Head coach: Hugh A. Woodle (2nd season)

1928 Southern college football independents records
	Conf.			Overall
Team	W	L	T	W		L		T
Georgetown		–		8	–	2	–	0
West Virginia		–		8	–	2	–	0
Howard		–		6	–	1	–	2
Loyola (LA)		–		7	–	3	–	0
Navy		–		5	–	3	–	1
East Tennessee State Teachers		–		4	–	3	–	0
Delaware State		–		1	–	1	–	1
Duke		–		5	–	5	–	0
Georgia Normal		–		5	–	5	–	0
Miami (FL)		–		4	–	4	–	1
Texas A&I		–		4	–	4	–	0
Texas Tech		–		4	–	4	–	1
Catholic University		–		4	–	5	–	0
Mississippi State Teachers		–		4	–	5	–	0
Middle Tennessee State Teachers		–		3	–	4	–	1
Texas Mines		–		3	–	4	–	1
Wesley		–		3	–	4	–	0
Appalachian State		–		3	–	6	–	0
Delaware		–		2	–	6	–	0
Wake Forest		–		2	–	6	–	2
Davidson		–		2	–	8	–	0
George Washington		–		1	–	7	–	0

The 1928 Georgia Normal Blue Tide Football Team represented Georgia Normal School—now known as Georgia Southern University—as an independent during the 1928 college football season. Led by Hugh A. Woodle in his second and final season as head coach, Georgia Normal compiled a record of 5–5.

== Schedule ==
Date	Opponent	Site	Result	Source
September 29	Waynesboro Junior College	Statesboro, GA	W 26–0	
October 8	Brewton–Parker	Statesboro, GA	L 2–6	
October 15	vs. Middle Georgia	Candler County fair grounds; Metter, GA	L 6–24	
	Benedictine Military School		W 7–6	
October 27	at South Georgia A&M	Tifton, GA	L 0–32	
November 2	Mercer freshmen	Statesboro, GA	W 7–0	
November 12	Piedmont	Statesboro, GA	L 0–12	
	Norman Junior College		L 0–7	
	South Georgia State		W 7–0	
November 29	Brewton–Parker	Mount Vernon, GA	W 21–0	
