= 1928 Texas Tech Matadors football team =

American college football season

1928 Texas Tech Matadors football
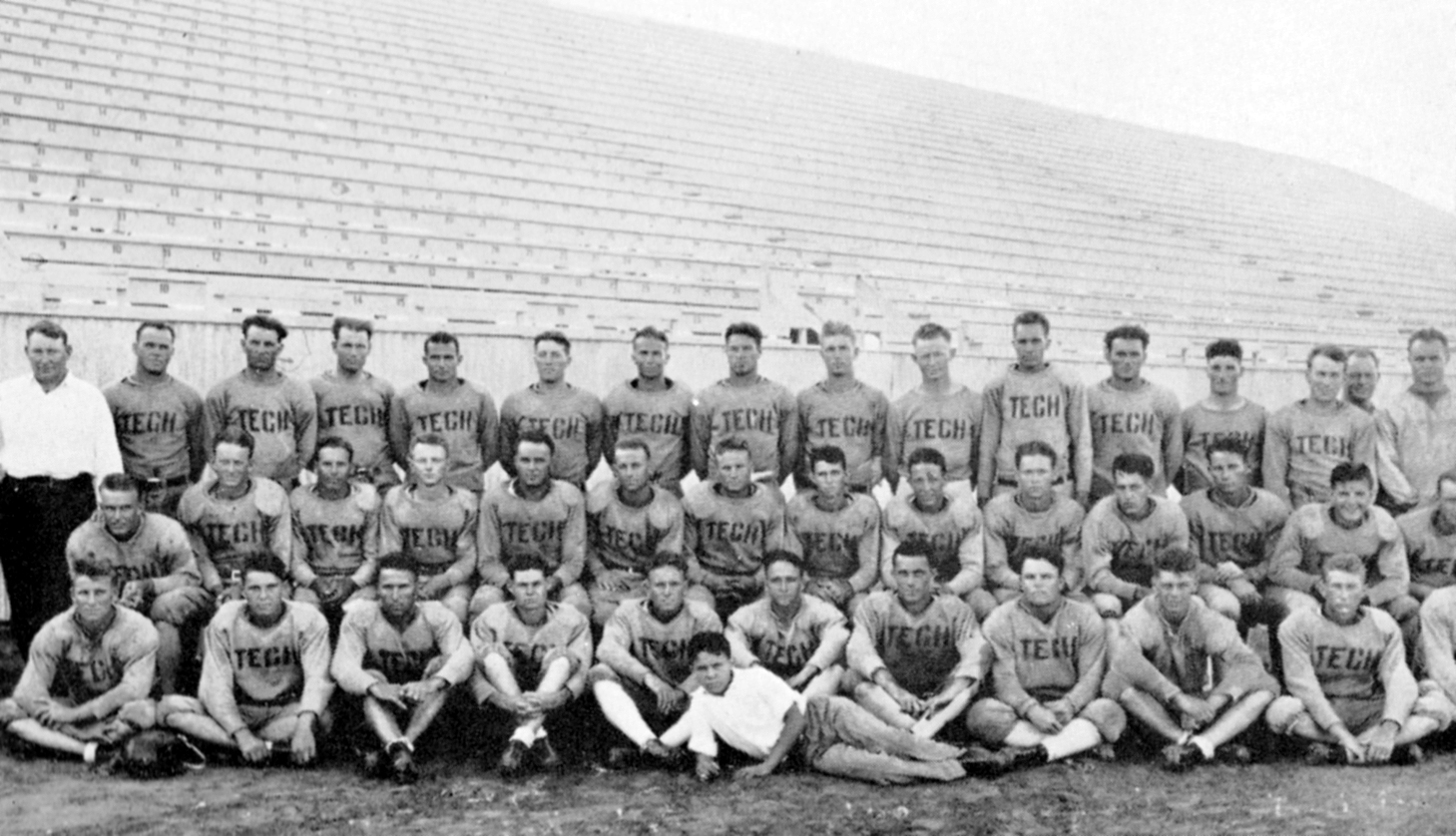
- 1928 Texas Tech football team
- Conference: Independent
- Record: 4–4–1
- Head coach: Ewing Y. Freeland (4th season)
- Offensive scheme: T formation
- Base defense: 7–2–2
- Captain: Ransom Walker
- Home stadium: Tech Field

1928 Southern college football independents records
	Conf.			Overall
Team	W	L	T	W		L		T
Georgetown		–		8	–	2	–	0
West Virginia		–		8	–	2	–	0
Howard		–		6	–	1	–	2
Loyola (LA)		–		7	–	3	–	0
Navy		–		5	–	3	–	1
East Tennessee State Teachers		–		4	–	3	–	0
Delaware State		–		1	–	1	–	1
Duke		–		5	–	5	–	0
Georgia Normal		–		5	–	5	–	0
Miami (FL)		–		4	–	4	–	1
Texas A&I		–		4	–	4	–	0
Texas Tech		–		4	–	4	–	1
Catholic University		–		4	–	5	–	0
Mississippi State Teachers		–		4	–	5	–	0
Middle Tennessee State Teachers		–		3	–	4	–	1
Texas Mines		–		3	–	4	–	1
Wesley		–		3	–	4	–	0
Appalachian State		–		3	–	6	–	0
Delaware		–		2	–	6	–	0
Wake Forest		–		2	–	6	–	2
Davidson		–		2	–	8	–	0
George Washington		–		1	–	7	–	0

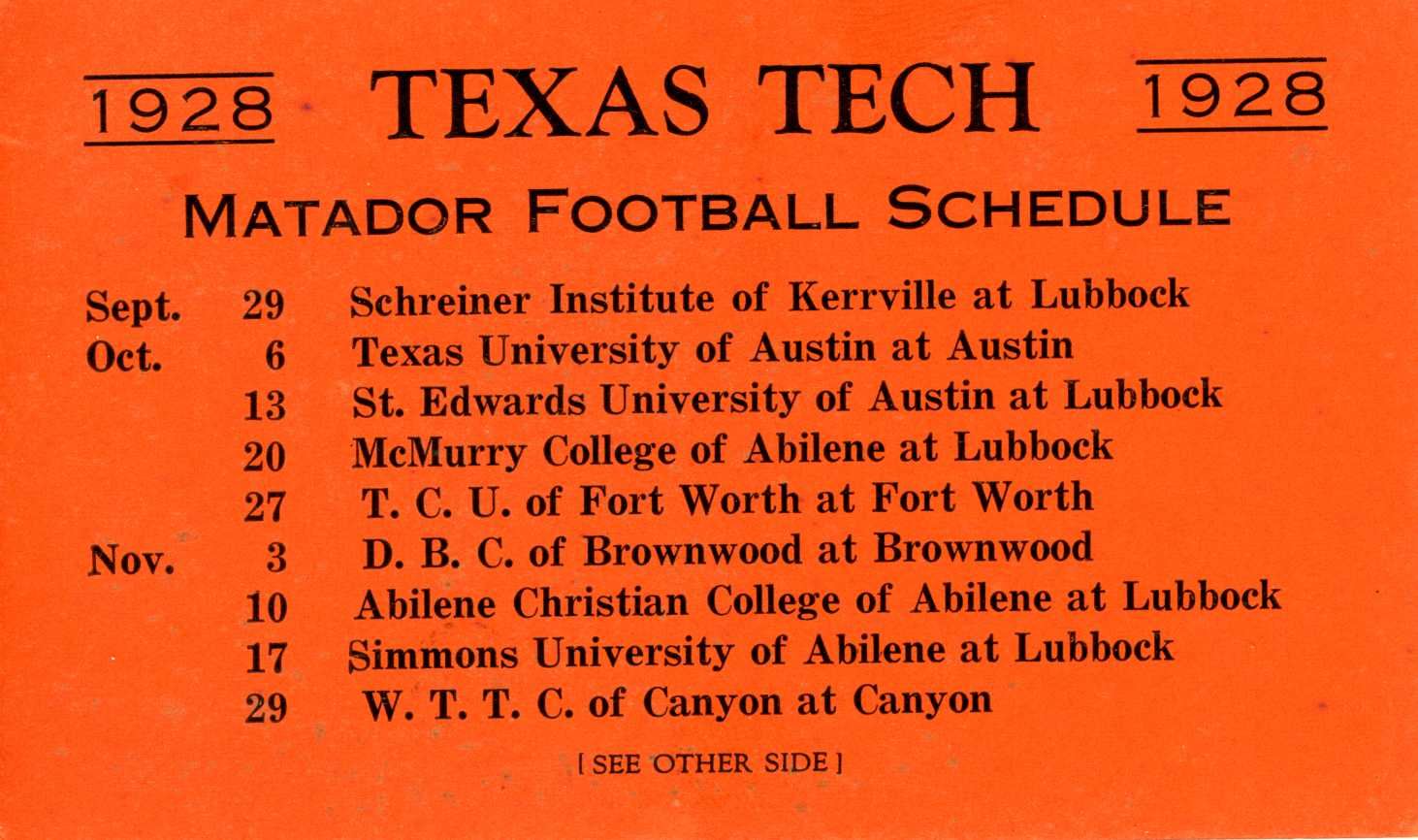
A card showing the 1928 season schedule

The 1928 Texas Tech Matadors football team represented Texas Technological College—now known as Texas Tech University—as an independent during the 1928 college football season. In their fourth and final season under head coach Ewing Y. Freeland, the Matadors compiled a 4–4–1 record and were outscored by opponents by a combined total of 79 to 47. The team played its home games at Tech Field.

== Schedule ==
Date	Time	Opponent	Site	Result	Attendance	Source
September 29		Schreiner	Tech Field; Lubbock, TX	W 7–0		
October 6		at Texas	War Memorial Stadium; Austin, TX (rivalry)	L 0–12		
October 13		St. Edward's	Tech Field; Lubbock, TX	W 13–6		
October 20	3:00 p.m.	McMurry	Tech Field; Lubbock, TX	W 3–0		
October 27		at TCU	Clark Field; Fort Worth, TX (rivalry)	L 6–28	6,000	
November 2		at Daniel Baker	Brownwood, TX	T 0–0		
November 10		Abilene Christian	Tech Field; Lubbock, TX	L 0–7		
November 17		Simmons (TX)	Tech Field; Lubbock, TX	L 0–19		
November 29		at West Texas State	Buffalo Stadium; Canyon, TX	W 18–7	6,000	
All times are in Central time
