= 1928 Catholic University Cardinals football team =

American college football season

1928 Catholic University Cardinals football
- Conference: Independent
- Record: 4–5
- Head coach: John B. McAuliffe (4th season)
- Home stadium: Brookland Stadium

1928 Southern college football independents records
	Conf.			Overall
Team	W	L	T	W		L		T
Georgetown		–		8	–	2	–	0
West Virginia		–		8	–	2	–	0
Howard		–		6	–	1	–	2
Loyola (LA)		–		7	–	3	–	0
Navy		–		5	–	3	–	1
East Tennessee State Teachers		–		4	–	3	–	0
Delaware State		–		1	–	1	–	1
Duke		–		5	–	5	–	0
Georgia Normal		–		5	–	5	–	0
Miami (FL)		–		4	–	4	–	1
Texas A&I		–		4	–	4	–	0
Texas Tech		–		4	–	4	–	1
Catholic University		–		4	–	5	–	0
Mississippi State Teachers		–		4	–	5	–	0
Middle Tennessee State Teachers		–		3	–	4	–	1
Texas Mines		–		3	–	4	–	1
Wesley		–		3	–	4	–	0
Appalachian State		–		3	–	6	–	0
Delaware		–		2	–	6	–	0
Wake Forest		–		2	–	6	–	2
Davidson		–		2	–	8	–	0
George Washington		–		1	–	7	–	0

The 1928 Catholic University Cardinals football team was an American football team that represented the Catholic University of America as an independent during the 1928 college football season. In their fourth season under head coach John B. McAuliffe, the Cardinals compiled a 4–5 record.

== Schedule ==
Date	Opponent	Site	Result	Source
September 29	at Boston College	Fenway Park; Boston, MA	L 6–38	
October 6	American	Brookland Stadium; Washington, DC	W 69–0	
October 13	Villanova	Brookland Stadium; Washington, DC	L 0–19	
October 20	at William & Mary	Cary Field; Williamsburg, VA	W 13–12	
October 27	at Mount St. Mary's	Echo Field; Emmitsburg, MD	L 6–12	
November 3	at Rutgers	Neilson Field; New Brunswick, NJ	L 0–12	
November 10	Loyola (MD)	Brookland Stadium; Washington, DC	W 21–13	
November 17	at St. John's	Ebbets Field; Brooklyn, NY	L 0–22	
November 29	George Washington	Brookland Stadium; Washington, DC	W 40–8	
