= 1928 George Washington Colonials football team =

American college football season

1928 George Washington Colonials football
- Conference: Independent
- Record: 1–7
- Head coach: Harry W. Crum (5th season)

1928 Southern college football independents records
	Conf.			Overall
Team	W	L	T	W		L		T
Georgetown		–		8	–	2	–	0
West Virginia		–		8	–	2	–	0
Howard		–		6	–	1	–	2
Loyola (LA)		–		7	–	3	–	0
Navy		–		5	–	3	–	1
East Tennessee State Teachers		–		4	–	3	–	0
Delaware State		–		1	–	1	–	1
Duke		–		5	–	5	–	0
Georgia Normal		–		5	–	5	–	0
Miami (FL)		–		4	–	4	–	1
Texas A&I		–		4	–	4	–	0
Texas Tech		–		4	–	4	–	1
Catholic University		–		4	–	5	–	0
Mississippi State Teachers		–		4	–	5	–	0
Middle Tennessee State Teachers		–		3	–	4	–	1
Texas Mines		–		3	–	4	–	1
Wesley		–		3	–	4	–	0
Appalachian State		–		3	–	6	–	0
Delaware		–		2	–	6	–	0
Wake Forest		–		2	–	6	–	2
Davidson		–		2	–	8	–	0
George Washington		–		1	–	7	–	0

The 1928 George Washington Colonials football team was an American football team that represented George Washington University as an independent during the 1928 college football season. In their fifth season under head coach Harry W. Crum, the team compiled a 1–7 record.

== Schedule ==
Date	Opponent	Site	Result	Attendance	Source
October 6	at Fordham	Fordham Field; Bronx, NY	L 0–20		
October 13	at Lafayette	Fisher Field; Easton, PA	L 0–28		
October 20	at Saint Francis (PA)	Altoona, PA	L 0–28		
October 27	CCNY	Central High School Stadium; Washington, DC	L 0–33	5,000	
November 3	William & Mary	Central High School Stadium; Washington, DC	L 0–24		
November 10	at Penn State	New Beaver Field; University Park, PA	L 0–50	5,000	
November 17	American	Washington, DC	W 19–0		
November 29	at Catholic University	Brookland Stadium; Washington, DC	L 8–40		
