= 1928 Middle Tennessee State Teachers football team =

American college football season

1928 Middle Tennessee State Teachers football
- Conference: Independent
- Record: 2–4–1
- Head coach: Frank Faulkinberry (3rd season)
- Captain: Hubert Swann

1928 Southern college football independents records
	Conf.			Overall
Team	W	L	T	W		L		T
Georgetown		–		8	–	2	–	0
West Virginia		–		8	–	2	–	0
Howard		–		6	–	1	–	2
Loyola (LA)		–		7	–	3	–	0
Navy		–		5	–	3	–	1
East Tennessee State Teachers		–		4	–	3	–	0
Delaware State		–		1	–	1	–	1
Duke		–		5	–	5	–	0
Georgia Normal		–		5	–	5	–	0
Miami (FL)		–		4	–	4	–	1
Texas A&I		–		4	–	4	–	0
Texas Tech		–		4	–	4	–	1
Catholic University		–		4	–	5	–	0
Mississippi State Teachers		–		4	–	5	–	0
Middle Tennessee State Teachers		–		3	–	4	–	1
Texas Mines		–		3	–	4	–	1
Wesley		–		3	–	4	–	0
Appalachian State		–		3	–	6	–	0
Delaware		–		2	–	6	–	0
Wake Forest		–		2	–	6	–	2
Davidson		–		2	–	8	–	0
George Washington		–		1	–	7	–	0

The 1928 Middle Tennessee State Teachers football team represented the Middle Tennessee State Teachers College (now known as Middle Tennessee State University) during the 1928 college football season. Led by third-year head coach Frank Faulkinberry, Middle Tennessee State Teachers compiled a record of 2–4–1. The team captain was Hubert Swann.

== Schedule ==
Date	Time	Opponent	Site	Result	Attendance	Source
		Jacksonville State	Murfreesboro, TN	W 6–0		
October 13		Cumberland (TN)	Murfreesboro, TN	L 0–13		
October 20		Western Kentucky State Normal	Murfreesboro, TN (rivalry)	L 0–19		
October 26	3:00 p.m.	at West Tennessee State	Memorial Field; Memphis, TN	T 13–13	2,500	
November 3		Murray State	Murfreesboro, TN	L 6–14		
		Bethel (TN)	Memphis, TN	W 32–0		
November 11		at Tennessee Tech	Cookeville, TN	L 12–25		
All times are in Central time
