= 1928 East Tennessee State Teachers football team =

American college football season

1928 East Tennessee State Teachers football
- Conference: Independent
- Record: 4–3
- Head coach: John Robinson (4th season)
- Captain: Edward "Buzz" Kennedy

1928 Southern college football independents records
	Conf.			Overall
Team	W	L	T	W		L		T
Georgetown		–		8	–	2	–	0
West Virginia		–		8	–	2	–	0
Howard		–		6	–	1	–	2
Loyola (LA)		–		7	–	3	–	0
Navy		–		5	–	3	–	1
East Tennessee State Teachers		–		4	–	3	–	0
Delaware State		–		1	–	1	–	1
Duke		–		5	–	5	–	0
Georgia Normal		–		5	–	5	–	0
Miami (FL)		–		4	–	4	–	1
Texas A&I		–		4	–	4	–	0
Texas Tech		–		4	–	4	–	1
Catholic University		–		4	–	5	–	0
Mississippi State Teachers		–		4	–	5	–	0
Middle Tennessee State Teachers		–		3	–	4	–	1
Texas Mines		–		3	–	4	–	1
Wesley		–		3	–	4	–	0
Appalachian State		–		3	–	6	–	0
Delaware		–		2	–	6	–	0
Wake Forest		–		2	–	6	–	2
Davidson		–		2	–	8	–	0
George Washington		–		1	–	7	–	0

The 1928 East Tennessee State Teachers football team was an American football team that represented East Tennessee State Teacher's College—now known as East Tennessee State University (ETSU)—as an independent in the 1927 college football season. They were led by fourth-year coach John Robinson. He was referred to affectionately as "Robbie" and was so popular that later the 1929 yearbook was dedicated to him. Robinson was assisted by William "Willie" Flinn Rogers, who taught history and government at the school from 1925 to 1928. For the first time since the program started, the 1928 squad had 28 men come out for football with 10 returning lettermen. As a result, the 1928 team was a success with their first winning record since the 1921 season, which included wins against high school competition. This season also marked the first time the school play rival Appalacchian State, which was then known as Appalachian Training School of Boone.

== Schedule ==
Date	Time	Opponent	Site	Result	Source
October 6	8:00 p.m.	at Emory and Henry	Emory, VA	L 0–48	
October 20	3:30 p.m.	Appalachian Normal	Johnson City, TN	W 9–6	
November 3		Hiwassee	Johnson City, TN	W 13–6	
November 10		at Mars Hill	Mars Hill, NC	W 24–7	
November 17		Union (KY)	Johnson City, TN	L 7–14	
November 24		at Weaver	Durham Field; Weaverville, NC	L 0–32	
November 29		at Bluefield	Bluefield, VA	W 13–0	
All times are in Eastern time
