= Hanes Field =

Stadium in Durham, North Carolina, U.S.

Hanes Field was a minor league baseball and football stadium that was located on the campus of Trinity College (now the East Campus of Duke University) in Durham, North Carolina, named for P. H. Hanes. Hanes Field opened in 1913 and was home to the Durham Bulls from 1913 to 1925. The Bulls moved to their new home of El Toro Park in 1926 (renamed Durham Athletic Park in 1934) and played there until 1994. The team now plays at Durham Bulls Athletic Park since 1995.

Hanes Field was replaced in 1995 by a new field hockey stadium, but the construction of that stadium was basically a transformation of Hanes Field into a field hockey stadium. The field hockey stadium is called Jack Katz Stadium and opened in 1996.
