= 1928 college football season =

American college football season

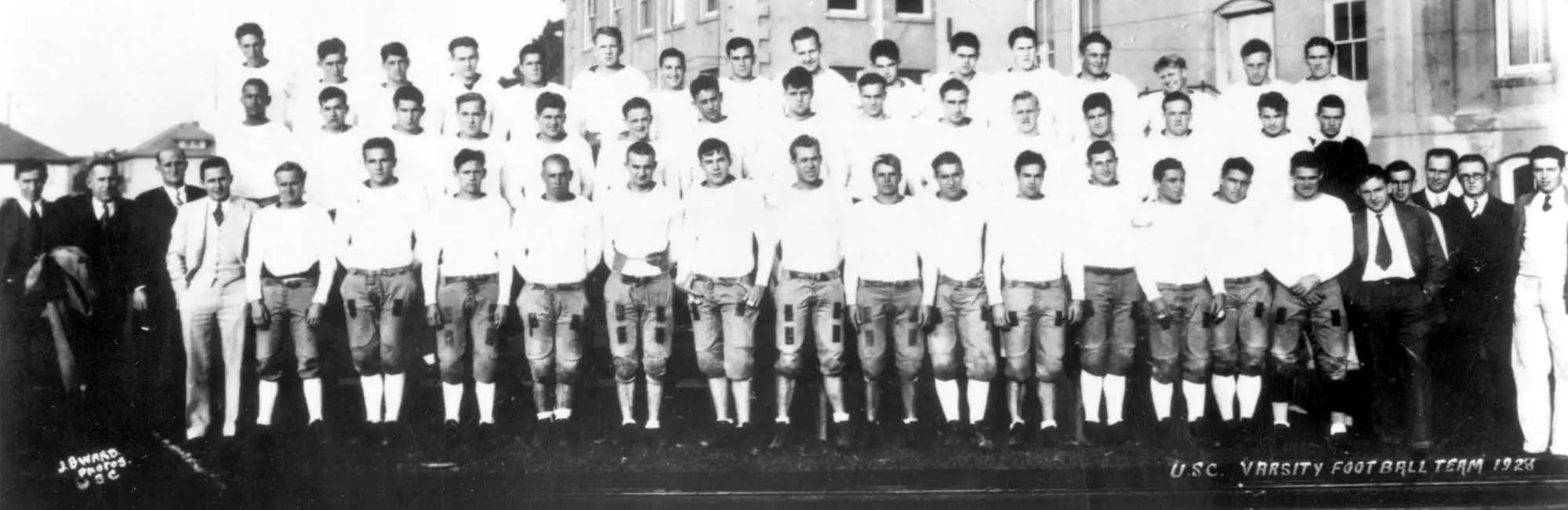
- USC, one of the teams considered champions (awarded Rissman Trophy)
- Number of bowls: 1
- Bowl games: January 1, 1929
- Champion(s): USC (Note: per Dickinson System (awarded Rissman Trophy) and Sagarin Ratings Predictor method); Georgia Tech (Note: per Berryman QPRS, Billingsley Report, Boand System, College Football Researchers Association, Helms Athletic Foundation, Houlgate System, National Championship Foundation, Poling System; co-champion (alongside Detroit) per Parke H. Davis (Spalding's Official Foot Ball Guide)); Detroit (Note: co-champion (alongside Georgia Tech) per Parke H. Davis (Spalding's Official Foot Ball Guide))

The 1928 football season had both the USC Trojans and the Georgia Tech Golden Tornado claim national championships. USC was recognized as champions under the Dickinson System, but the Rose Bowl was contested between the No. 2 and No. 3 Dickinson-rated teams, California and Georgia Tech. The game was decided by a safety scored after Roy "Wrong Way" Riegels ran 65 yards in the wrong direction. Vance Maree blocked the ensuing punt which gave Georgia Tech a safety deciding the 8–7 win.

The Florida Gators led the nation in scoring as a team, led by its "Phantom Four" backfield, with 336 points. They were remembered by many sports commentators as the best Florida football team until at least the 1960s. NYU halfback Ken Strong led the nation in scoring as an individual, with 162 points, and tallied some 3,000 total yards from scrimmage.

== Conference and program changes ==
=== Conference changes ===
- Six conferences began play in 1928:
  - Arkansas Intercollegiate Conference – an NAIA Division I conference active through the 1995 season; its former members now largely comprise the NCAA Division II Great American Conference
  - Big Six Conference – an NCAA Division I–A conference active through the 1996 season; founded after the original Missouri Valley Intercollegiate Athletic Association disbanded in May 1928 with six of its former members (Iowa State, Kansas, Kansas State, Missouri, Nebraska, and Oklahoma); later known as the Big Eight Conference after adding Oklahoma A&M and Colorado and a predecessor to the present-day Big 12 Conference
  - Central Intercollegiate Athletic Conference – an NAIA conference active through the 1968 season
  - Kansas Collegiate Athletic Conference – an active NAIA conference; separate from the previous conference with the same name that disbanded after the 1927 season
  - Mississippi Valley Conference – active through the 1934 season
  - Missouri Valley Conference – an NCAA Division I-A conference active through the 1985 season; founded by the four remaining members of the former MVIAA (Drake, Grinnell, Oklahoma A&M, and Washington University in St. Louis) and independent Creighton; a separate entity from the present-day Missouri Valley Football Conference
- One conference played its final season in 1928:
  - Oklahoma Intercollegiate Conference – active since the 1914 season; a separate conference with the same name would exist within the NAIA between the 1974 and 1996 seasons; largely replaced by the Oklahoma Collegiate Athletic Conference between the 1929 and 1974 seasons

=== Membership changes ===
School	1927 Conference	1928 Conference
Appalachian State University Mountaineers	Program Established	Independent
Creighton University Bluejays	Independent	Missouri Valley
Drake University Bulldogs	MVIAA	Missouri Valley
Iowa State Cyclones	MVIAA	Big Six (MVIAA)
Grinnell Pioneers	MVIAA	Missouri Valley
University of Kansas Jayhawks	MVIAA	Big Six (MVIAA)
Kansas State Wildcats	MVIAA	Big Six (MVIAA)
University of Missouri Tigers	MVIAA	Big Six (MVIAA)
Nebraska Cornhuskers	MVIAA	Big Six (MVIAA)
Oklahoma Sooners	MVIAA	Big Six (MVIAA)
Oklahoma A&M Cowboys	MVIAA	Missouri Valley
UCLA Bruins	SCIAC	Pacific Coast
Washington University in St. Louis Bears	MVIAA	Missouri Valley

== September ==
=== September 29 ===
Army beat Boston University 35–0. New York University (NYU) beat Niagara College 21–0. Pennsylvania def Ursinus 34–0. California beat Santa Clara 22–0 and USC beat Utah State, 40–12. Texas beat its crosstown neighbor, Austin's St. Edward's College, 32–0.

== October ==
=== October 6 ===
Nebraska opened its season with a 12–0 win at Iowa State. Army narrowly beat the visiting SMU Mustangs, 14–13. NYU beat West Virginia Wesleyan, 26–7. Pennsylvania def. Franklin & Marshall 46–0. Texas beat Texas Tech 12–0. After losing 2 games out of 3 to non-college opponents, Stanford won at Oregon 26–12; USC beat visiting Oregon State 19–0. California beat St. Mary's, 7–0 Wisconsin beat visiting Notre Dame, 22–6. Georgia Tech beat VMI, 13–0. Illinois beat Bradley, 33–6. Iowa played a Sunday game against Monmouth College, winning 26–0.

=== October 13 ===
Stanford beat visiting UCLA 45–7, and California beat Washington State, 13–3. USC defeated St. Mary's, 19–6.

In New Orleans, Georgia Tech beat Tulane, 12–0, and in Dallas, Texas narrowly lost to Vanderbilt, 13–12. Pennsylvania shut out Swarthmore 67–0. NYU defeated Fordham* 34–7. Army shut out Providence 44–0. Nebraska beat Montana State, 26–6. Iowa won at Chicago, 13–0, while Illinois hosted Iowa's Coe College, winning 31–0 Wisconsin hosted Cornell College of Iowa, and North Dakota State University, with the varsity winning the first game 49–0, and the reserves beating the Dakotans 13–7.

=== October 20 ===
In Berkeley, California and USC played to a 0–0 tie. With the exception of this game, USC played all of its other contests at home in Los Angeles in 1928.

Georgia Tech shut out Notre Dame at home, 13–0. Army won at Harvard 15–0. NYU beat Rutgers* 48–0. Pennsylvania recorded its fourth shutout, beating Penn State 14–0. In San Francisco, Stanford beat Idaho, 47–0. Wisconsin and Purdue tied 19–19, and Illinois beat Indiana 13–7. Iowa beat Ripon College, 61–6. Nebraska edged visiting Syracuse, 7–6. Texas beat Arkansas, 20–7. After its first two wins over Ashland College (65–0) and Thiel (38–13), Carnegie Tech beat Washington & Jefferson, 19–0.

=== October 27 ===
Army won at Yale, 18–6. NYU beat Colgate 47–6. Pennsylvania (4–0–0) was upset by (1–3–0) Navy, 6–0. Prior to that, Penn had outscored its opponents 161–0. USC beat Occidental 19–0. Stanford beat Fresno State, 47–0. Wisconsin won at Michigan, 7–0, and Iowa beat Minnesota, 7–6, while Illinois beat Northwestern 6–0. Carnegie Tech beat Pittsburgh, 6–0. Georgia Tech yielded its first points, winning at North Carolina, 20–7. Nebraska shut out Missouri, 24–0, and Texas won at Rice, 13–6. California lost to the Olympic Club of San Francisco, 12–0. Olympic, nominally an amateur team of former college players, had beaten Stanford 12–6 earlier.

== November ==
=== November 3 ===
In Los Angeles, USC (4–0–1) and Stanford (5–2–0) met, with the Trojans winning 10–0. Wisconsin beat visiting Alabama, 15–0, while 4–0–0 Illinois suffered its first loss, at Michigan, 3–0. California beat Oregon, 13–0. Nebraska won at Kansas, 20–0. Texas lost to visiting SMU, 6–2. Pennsylvania won at Chicago, 20–13. NYU and Georgetown University, both 5–0–0, with the Hoyas winning 7–2. Army beat Indiana's DePauw College, 38–12. Iowa defeated visiting South Dakota, 19–0. Carnegie Tech extended its streak, with a 32–0 win over Westminster College of Pennsylvania, and Georgia Tech beat visiting Oglethorpe College 32–7.

=== November 10 ===
Army (6–0–0) hosted Notre Dame(4–2–0). A crowd of 90,000 packed the stands while 5,000 others in the Bronx watched from roofs and fire escapes within view of Yankee Stadium. Though the Fighting Irish weren't having a good year, the score was 0–0 when Knute Rockne inspired his team at halftime by relating George Gipp's deathbed wish ("When the team's up against it, when things are wrong and the breaks are beating the boys—tell them to go in there with all they've got and win just one for the Gipper"). Though Army scored a touchdown in the third quarter, touchdowns by Jack Chevigny and Johnny O'Brien gave the Irish a 12–6 lead. In the final minute, Army drove to within one foot of the goal line, but the whistle sounded before the Cadets could snap the ball.

In the New York Daily News the following Monday, reporter Francis Wallace first related the story in an article entitled, "Gipp's Ghost Beat Army."

The big game in the South was in Atlanta, where Vanderbilt (6–0–0) visited Georgia Tech (5–0–0), and the home team won 19–7. Texas won at Baylor, 6–0.

Wisconsin defeated Chicago, 25–0, and Iowa won at Ohio State, 14–7. In Indianapolis, Illinois beat Butler, 14–0.

Pennsylvania won at Harvard, 7–0 NYU beat Alfred University, 71–0. USC beat Arizona, 78–7, Stanford beat Santa Clara 31–0, and California won at Washington, 6–0. Carnegie Tech won at Georgetown, 13–7.

Nebraska, which had not played Oklahoma during the last two seasons, renewed a rivalry that became one of the most notable in college football. Playing at Oklahoma, the Cornhuskers won 44–6.

=== November 17 ===
Iowa (6–0–0) hosted Wisconsin (6–0–1) in a meeting of unbeatens, with the visitors handing the Hawkeyes their first loss, 13–0. Illinois won at Chicago, 40–0. Georgia Tech beat Alabama at home, 33–13. Nebraska (6–0–0) hosted the (5–2–0) Pitt Panthers, and were tied, 0–0. Pennsylvania beat Columbia 34–7 NYU beat Missouri, 27–6. Army beat Carleton, 32–7. Texas beat a strong TCU team, 6–0. USC won again, defeating Washington State, 27–13, while Stanford beat Washington, 12–0, California rolled over visiting Nevada, 60–0. (6–0–0) Carnegie Tech won at (5–2–0) Notre Dame, 27–7.

=== November 24 ===
Carnegie Tech (7–0–0) and NYU (7–1–0) met at Pittsburgh. The Violets handed Tech its first defeat, 27–13. Ken Strong gained widespread fame. He threw two long touchdown passes, rushed for two touchdowns, and kicked three extra points, leading Grantland Rice to write:

This attack was led by a runaway buffalo, using the speed of a deer, and his name was Ken Strong. He ran all over a big, powerful team, smashed its line, ran its ends, kicked 50 and 55 yards, threw passes and tackled all over the lot. Today he was George Gipp, Red Grange and Chris Cagle rolled into one human form and there was nothing Carnegie Tech had that could stop his march.

Carnegie Tech coach Walter Steffen said of Strong's performance: "This is the first time in my career that one man was good enough to run over and completely wreck an exceptionally good team. I can tell you he is better than Heston or Thorpe."

Georgia Tech crushed visiting Auburn, 51–0. Auburn won only 1 of its 9 games, and scored in only two of those contests.

Army (7–1–0) and Nebraska (6–0–1) met at West Point, with the Cadets beating the visiting Cornhuskers, 13–3. Stanford and California tied at Berkeley, 13–13. USC beat Idaho, 28–7.

=== November 29 ===
On Thanksgiving Day, Pennsylvania beat Cornell 49–0. Overall, the Penn Quakers had outscored their opponents 271 to 26, and finished 8–1–0. NYU closed its season with a 25–13 loss to visiting Oregon State, and finished 8–2–0. Wisconsin hosted Minnesota, and suffered its first loss, a 6–0 defeat, to close at 7–1–1. After starting the season 6–0, Iowa closed with a second loss, at Michigan, 10–7, to finish 6–2–0. Illinois closed at 7–1–0 after beating visiting Ohio State, 8–0. Nebraska closed its season with an 8–0 win over Kansas State, and Texas wrapped with a 19–0 win over Texas A&M.

=== December 1 ===
Army and Stanford met at Yankee Stadium, with Stanford shutting the Cadets out, 26–0. In Los Angeles, USC hosted Notre Dame, winning 27–14, to close its season at 9–0–1.

=== December 8 ===
Georgia Tech hosted Georgia and won 20–6, closing regular play at 9–0, before the Yellow Jackets' trip to the Rose Bowl. The Jackets finished 7–0 in Southern Conference play, assuring themselves of at least a share of the conference title.

In one of the final games of the 1928 season, once-tied Tennessee hosted unbeaten Florida in Knoxville. For coach Charlie Bachman's Florida Gators, a share of the Southern Conference title was at stake; coach Robert Neyland's Tennessee Volunteers were playing for pride. Tennessee edged Florida, 13–12. Florida finished 8–1, Tennessee 9–0–1, and unbeaten and untied Georgia Tech won the conference championship outright.

== Rose Bowl ==
As the lone post-season college football game, the Rose Bowl matched the California Golden Bears, co-champions (with USC) of the Pacific Coast Conference, against the Georgia Tech Yellow Jackets, nicknamed the "Golden Tornado" as well as the "champions of the South". In the second quarter, the Jackets were on their own 25 yard line, when Warner Mizell fumbled the football. Playing linebacker, California center Roy Riegels scooped up the fumble at the 34 and dashed, unimpeded, toward the end zone. Unfortunately, Riegels had gotten turned around and ran downfield toward the California goal. Though Riegels was not tackled in his own end zone, California chose to punt from there on first down, and Benny Lom's kick was blocked by Tech's Tom Jones, and Cal's Stan Barr fell on the ball for the safety. Georgia Tech's 2–0 lead at halftime was extended to 8–0 after Stumpy Thomason ran for 15 yards for a score, and the conversion failed. Lom's pass to Irv Phillips, and Barr's extra point, made it 8–7 with a minute left. An onside kick attempt failed, and Georgia Tech ran out the clock to win the other national championship.

== Conference standings ==
=== Major conference standings ===
1928 Big Six Conference football standings
	Conf.					Overall
Team	W		L		T	W		L		T
Nebraska $	5	–	0	–	0	7	–	1	–	1
Oklahoma	3	–	2	–	0	5	–	3	–	0
Missouri	3	–	2	–	0	4	–	4	–	0
Iowa State	2	–	2	–	1	2	–	5	–	1
Kansas	1	–	3	–	1	2	–	4	–	2
Kansas State	0	–	5	–	0	3	–	5	–	0
$ – Conference champion

1928 Rocky Mountain Conference football standings
	Conf.					Overall
Team	W		L		T	W		L		T
Utah $	4	–	0	–	1	5	–	0	–	2
Colorado	5	–	1	–	0	5	–	1	–	0
Colorado Agricultural	6	–	2	–	0	6	–	2	–	0
Utah Agricultural	4	–	2	–	1	5	–	3	–	1
Colorado College	5	–	3	–	0	5	–	3	–	0
Montana State	3	–	2	–	0	4	–	4	–	1
Denver	3	–	4	–	1	4	–	4	–	1
Colorado Teachers	3	–	4	–	0	4	–	4	–	0
Colorado Mines	2	–	4	–	0	2	–	5	–	0
BYU	1	–	3	–	1	3	–	3	–	1
Wyoming	0	–	5	–	0	2	–	7	–	0
Western State (CO)	0	–	6	–	0	0	–	7	–	0
$ – Conference champion

1928 Big Ten Conference football standings
	Conf.					Overall
Team	W		L		T	W		L		T
No. 6 Illinois $	4	–	1	–	0	7	–	1	–	0
No. 4 Wisconsin	3	–	1	–	1	7	–	1	–	1
Minnesota	4	–	2	–	0	6	–	2	–	0
No. 6 Iowa	3	–	2	–	0	6	–	2	–	0
Ohio State	3	–	2	–	0	5	–	2	–	1
Purdue	2	–	2	–	1	5	–	2	–	1
Northwestern	2	–	3	–	0	5	–	3	–	0
Michigan	2	–	3	–	0	3	–	4	–	1
Indiana	2	–	4	–	0	4	–	4	–	0
Chicago	0	–	5	–	0	2	–	7	–	0
$ – Conference champion; Rankings from Dickinson System

1928 Southern Conference football standings
	Conf.					Overall
Team	W		L		T	W		L		T
No. 3 Georgia Tech $	7	–	0	–	0	10	–	0	–	0
Tennessee	6	–	0	–	1	9	–	0	–	1
Florida	6	–	1	–	0	8	–	1	–	0
VPI	4	–	1	–	0	7	–	2	–	0
Alabama	6	–	2	–	0	6	–	3	–	0
LSU	3	–	1	–	1	6	–	2	–	1
Clemson	4	–	2	–	0	8	–	3	–	0
Vanderbilt	4	–	2	–	0	8	–	2	–	0
Tulane	3	–	3	–	1	6	–	3	–	1
Ole Miss	3	–	3	–	0	5	–	4	–	0
North Carolina	2	–	2	–	2	5	–	3	–	2
Kentucky	2	–	2	–	1	4	–	3	–	1
South Carolina	2	–	2	–	1	6	–	2	–	2
Maryland	2	–	3	–	1	6	–	3	–	1
VMI	2	–	3	–	1	5	–	3	–	2
Georgia	2	–	4	–	0	4	–	5	–	0
NC State	1	–	3	–	1	4	–	5	–	1
Mississippi A&M	1	–	4	–	0	2	–	4	–	2
Virginia	1	–	6	–	0	2	–	6	–	1
Washington and Lee	1	–	6	–	0	2	–	8	–	0
Sewanee	0	–	5	–	0	2	–	7	–	0
Auburn	0	–	7	–	0	1	–	8	–	0
$ – Conference champion; Rankings from Dickinson System

1928 Pacific Coast Conference football standings
	Conf.					Overall
Team	W		L		T	W		L		T
No. 1 USC $	4	–	0	–	1	9	–	0	–	1
No. 2 California ^	3	–	0	–	2	6	–	2	–	2
No. 4 Stanford	4	–	1	–	1	8	–	3	–	1
Oregon	4	–	2	–	0	9	–	2	–	0
Washington State	4	–	3	–	0	7	–	3	–	0
Oregon State	2	–	3	–	0	6	–	3	–	0
Idaho	2	–	3	–	0	3	–	4	–	1
Washington	2	–	4	–	0	7	–	4	–	0
UCLA	0	–	4	–	0	4	–	4	–	1
Montana	0	–	5	–	0	4	–	5	–	1
$ – Conference champion; ^ – Selected as Rose Bowl representative (USC declined); Rankings from Dickinson System

1928 Southwest Conference football standings
	Conf.					Overall
Team	W		L		T	W		L		T
Texas $	5	–	1	–	0	7	–	2	–	0
Arkansas	2	–	1	–	0	7	–	2	–	0
Baylor	3	–	2	–	0	8	–	2	–	0
TCU	3	–	2	–	0	8	–	2	–	0
SMU	2	–	2	–	1	6	–	3	–	1
Texas A&M	1	–	3	–	1	5	–	4	–	1
Rice	0	–	5	–	0	2	–	7	–	0
$ – Conference champion

=== Independents ===
1928 Eastern college football independents records
	Conf.			Overall
Team	W	L	T	W		L		T
Boston College		–		9	–	0	–	0
West Chester		–		8	–	0	–	0
Villanova		–		7	–	0	–	1
Brown		–		8	–	1	–	0
No. 11 Penn		–		8	–	1	–	0
No. 6 Carnegie Tech		–		7	–	1	–	0
No. 9 Army		–		8	–	2	–	0
Drexel		–		8	–	2	–	0
No. 10 NYU		–		8	–	2	–	0
Temple		–		7	–	1	–	2
Lafayette		–		6	–	1	–	2
Princeton		–		5	–	1	–	2
CCNY		–		4	–	1	–	2
Pittsburgh		–		6	–	2	–	1
Harvard		–		5	–	2	–	1
Tufts		–		5	–	2	–	1
Colgate		–		6	–	3	–	0
Rutgers		–		6	–	3	–	0
Bucknell		–		5	–	2	–	3
Columbia		–		5	–	3	–	1
Boston University		–		3	–	3	–	2
Cornell		–		3	–	3	–	2
Syracuse		–		4	–	4	–	1
Yale		–		4	–	4	–	0
Fordham		–		4	–	5	–	0
Franklin & Marshall		–		4	–	5	–	0
Penn State		–		3	–	5	–	1
Lehigh		–		3	–	6	–	0
Washington & Jefferson		–		2	–	5	–	2
Providence		–		1	–	5	–	3
Vermont		–		1	–	7	–	2
Rankings from Dickinson System

1928 Midwestern college football independents records
	Conf.			Overall
Team	W	L	T	W		L		T
Detroit		–		9	–	0	–	0
Butler		–		6	–	2	–	0
John Carroll		–		6	–	3	–	0
Kent State		–		4	–	2	–	2
Marquette		–		5	–	3	–	1
Ball Teachers		–		3	–	2	–	2
Notre Dame		–		5	–	4	–	0
DePaul		–		4	–	4	–	1
Haskell		–		5	–	5	–	0
Michigan Tech		–		2	–	2	–	1
Saint Louis		–		4	–	4	–	1
Wabash		–		4	–	4	–	1
Loyola (IL)		–		4	–	4	–	0
Lombard		–		3	–	4	–	1
Michigan State		–		3	–	4	–	1
Detroit City College		–		2	–	5	–	1
Valparaiso		–		1	–	6	–	0

1928 Southern college football independents records
	Conf.			Overall
Team	W	L	T	W		L		T
Georgetown		–		8	–	2	–	0
West Virginia		–		8	–	2	–	0
Howard		–		6	–	1	–	2
Loyola (LA)		–		7	–	3	–	0
Navy		–		5	–	3	–	1
East Tennessee State Teachers		–		4	–	3	–	0
Delaware State		–		1	–	1	–	1
Duke		–		5	–	5	–	0
Georgia Normal		–		5	–	5	–	0
Miami (FL)		–		4	–	4	–	1
Texas A&I		–		4	–	4	–	0
Texas Tech		–		4	–	4	–	1
Catholic University		–		4	–	5	–	0
Mississippi State Teachers		–		4	–	5	–	0
Middle Tennessee State Teachers		–		3	–	4	–	1
Texas Mines		–		3	–	4	–	1
Wesley		–		3	–	4	–	0
Appalachian State		–		3	–	6	–	0
Delaware		–		2	–	6	–	0
Wake Forest		–		2	–	6	–	2
Davidson		–		2	–	8	–	0
George Washington		–		1	–	7	–	0

1928 Western college football independents records
	Conf.			Overall
Team	W	L	T	W		L		T
Arizona		–		5	–	1	–	2
Idaho Southern Branch		–		5	–	1	–	2
Gonzaga		–		6	–	2	–	1
New Mexico		–		5	–	2	–	1
Humboldt State		–		2	–	1	–	0
Loyola (CA)		–		5	–	3	–	0
Tempe State		–		3	–	2	–	1
Regis		–		5	–	4	–	0
Santa Clara		–		5	–	4	–	0
New Mexico A&M		–		4	–	5	–	0
Hawaii		–		2	–	5	–	0

=== Minor conferences ===
Conference	Champion(s)	Record
Central Intercollegiate Athletics Association	Hampton Institute	7–0
Central Intercollegiate Athletic Conference	College of Emporia	6–0
Far Western Conference	Saint Mary's (CA)	2–0
Kansas Collegiate Athletic Conference	Baker	5–0–2
Iowa Intercollegiate Athletic Conference	Iowa State Teachers	4–0–2
Michigan Intercollegiate Athletic Association	Albion	5–0
Midwest Collegiate Athletic Conference	Coe	4–0–1
Minnesota Intercollegiate Athletic Conference	Augsburg; Saint Mary's	4–1–2; 6–1
Missouri Intercollegiate Athletic Association	Northeast Missouri State Teachers; Southwest Missouri State Teachers	3–0–1
Nebraska College Athletic Conference	Hastings	5–0–1
Nebraska Intercollegiate Athletic Association	Nebraska State Teachers–Peru	—
North Central Intercollegiate Conference	North Dakota	4–0
Ohio Athletic Conference	Heidelberg	6–0–1
Oklahoma Intercollegiate Conference	Phillips	5–1–1
Pacific Northwest Conference	Whitman	4–0
Southern California Intercollegiate Athletic Conference	Occidental	5–1
South Dakota Intercollegiate Conference	Black Hills Teachers	5–0
Southern Intercollegiate Athletic Conference	Clark College; Tuskegee	5–1–1
Southwestern Athletic Conference	Wiley (TX)	5–0
Texas Collegiate Athletic Conference	Howard Payne	5–0
Texas Intercollegiate Athletic Association	Daniel Baker	4–0
Tri-Normal League	State Normal–Ellensburg	2–0
Wisconsin State Teachers College Conference	Oshkosh State Teachers; Stevens Point State Teachers; Superior State Teachers	3–0–1

=== Minor conference standings ===
1928 Buckeye Athletic Association football standings
	Conf.					Overall
Team	W		L		T	W		L		T
Ohio Wesleyan +	4	–	1	–	0	8	–	1	–	0
Wittenberg +	4	–	1	–	0	6	–	3	–	0
Miami (OH)	3	–	2	–	0	6	–	2	–	0
Ohio	2	–	3	–	0	6	–	3	–	0
Denison	2	–	3	–	0	5	–	3	–	0
Cincinnati	0	–	5	–	0	1	–	8	–	0
+ – Conference co-champions

1928 California Coast Conference football standings
	Conf.					Overall
Team	W		L		T	W		L		T
San Mateo +	7	–	0	–	0	?	–	?	–	?
San Jose State +	6	–	2	–	0	6	–	2	–	1
Modesto	5	–	2	–	1	5	–	3	–	1
Sacramento	3	–	2	–	0	?	–	?	–	?
Cal Poly	1	–	2	–	1	3	–	4	–	2
Santa Barbara State	1	–	2	–	0	4	–	5	–	0
Chico State	1	–	4	–	0	2	–	6	–	0
Santa Rosa	2	–	5	–	0	?	–	?	–	?
Marin	0	–	4	–	0	?	–	?	–	?
Championship: San Jose State 21, San Mateo 21
+ – Conference co-champions

1928 Central Intercollegiate Conference football standings
	Conf.					Overall
Team	W		L		T	W		L		T
College of Emporia $	6	–	0	–	0	8	–	0	–	0
Emporia Teachers	4	–	1	–	1	6	–	1	–	1
Southwestern (KS)	3	–	1	–	2	4	–	3	–	2
Hays Teachers	3	–	2	–	1	3	–	3	–	2
Wichita	2	–	4	–	0	3	–	5	–	0
Washburn	1	–	5	–	0	2	–	7	–	0
Pittsburg State	0	–	6	–	0	0	–	7	–	0
$ – Conference champion

1928 Colored Intercollegiate Athletic Association football standings
	Conf.					Overall
Team	W		L		T	W		L		T
Hampton $	8	–	0	–	0	8	–	1	–	0
Virginia State	7	–	1	–	0	9	–	1	–	0
Virginia Seminary	3	–	2	–	2	3	–	2	–	2
North Carolina A&T	3	–	3	–	1	3	–	4	–	2
Virginia Union	2	–	3	–	1	2	–	5	–	1
Lincoln (PA)	1	–	3	–	2	1	–	3	–	2
Shaw	1	–	3	–	1	1	–	6	–	1
Saint Paul (VA)	1	–	6	–	0	2	–	6	–	0
North Carolina College	0	–	6	–	1	2	–	6	–	1
$ – Conference champion

1928 Eastern Pennsylvania Collegiate Conference football standings
	Conf.					Overall
Team	W		L		T	W		L		T
Gettysburg $	3	–	0	–	0	6	–	2	–	1
Ursinus	2	–	1	–	0	3	–	6	–	0
Dickinson	2	–	2	–	0	3	–	4	–	1
Franklin & Marshall	1	–	3	–	0	4	–	5	–	0
Muhlenberg	1	–	3	–	0	1	–	8	–	0
$ – Conference champion

1928 Far Western Conference football standings
	Conf.					Overall
Team	W		L		T	W		L		T
Saint Mary's $	2	–	0	–	0	5	–	4	–	0
Cal Aggies	3	–	1	–	0	6	–	3	–	0
St. Ignatius (CA)	3	–	1	–	0	4	–	4	–	0
Pacific (CA)	2	–	1	–	0	5	–	2	–	0
Fresno State	0	–	3	–	1	2	–	5	–	1
Nevada	0	–	4	–	1	0	–	7	–	1
$ – Conference champion

1928 Illinois Intercollegiate Athletic Conference football standings
	Conf.					Overall
Team	W		L		T	W		L		T
Eastern Illinois +	5	–	0	–	1	7	–	0	–	1
Millikin +	5	–	0	–	1	6	–	0	–	2
Augustana (IL)	6	–	1	–	0	7	–	1	–	0
Bradley	6	–	1	–	0	7	–	2	–	0
Monmouth (IL)	5	–	1	–	0	6	–	3	–	0
Southern Illinois	3	–	1	–	0	7	–	1	–	2
McKendree	2	–	1	–	0	5	–	5	–	0
Illinois Wesleyan	5	–	3	–	0	5	–	3	–	0
Carthage	2	–	2	–	1	2	–	3	–	2
Lake Forest	1	–	1	–	0	2	–	4	–	1
Illinois College	4	–	5	–	0	4	–	5	–	0
Eureka	3	–	4	–	1	3	–	4	–	1
North Central	2	–	3	–	1	4	–	3	–	2
Mount Morris	2	–	3	–	0	3	–	3	–	1
Western Illinois	2	–	3	–	2	2	–	3	–	3
St. Viator	1	–	3	–	0	3	–	5	–	0
Illinois State Normal	2	–	6	–	0	2	–	6	–	0
Knox (IL)	1	–	4	–	0	3	–	5	–	0
Wheaton (IL)	0	–	2	–	1	3	–	4	–	1
Northern Illinois State	0	–	2	–	1	0	–	6	–	1
Shurtleff	0	–	3	–	1	1	–	4	–	1
Lincoln (IL)	0	–	8	–	0	0	–	8	–	0
+ – Conference co-champions

1928 Indiana Intercollegiate Conference football standings
	Conf.					Overall
Team	W		L		T	W		L		T
DePauw +	6	–	0	–	0	6	–	2	–	0
Butler +	4	–	0	–	0	6	–	2	–	0
Indiana State	4	–	1	–	0	4	–	3	–	0
Indiana Central	5	–	2	–	1	5	–	2	–	1
Wabash	2	–	1	–	0	4	–	4	–	1
Earlham	4	–	3	–	0	5	–	3	–	0
Central Normal	4	–	3	–	0	4	–	3	–	0
Ball State	2	–	2	–	2	3	–	2	–	2
Manchester	2	–	2	–	0	4	–	2	–	1
Oakland City	3	–	4	–	0	3	–	4	–	0
Hanover	2	–	3	–	0	3	–	4	–	0
Franklin (IN)	1	–	6	–	1	1	–	6	–	1
Valparaiso	0	–	2	–	0	1	–	6	–	0
Rose Poly	0	–	5	–	0	0	–	6	–	0
Evansville	0	–	5	–	0	0	–	7	–	0
+ – Conference co-champions

1928 Interstate Athletic Conference football standings
	Conf.					Overall
Team	W		L		T	W		L		T
Moorhead State $	4	–	0	–	0	4	–	1	–	1
Valley City State	5	–	1	–	0	5	–	2	–	0
Jamestown	4	–	2	–	0	4	–	4	–	0
Wahpeton	3	–	3	–	0	?	–	?	–	?
Minot State	2	–	2	–	1	2	–	2	–	1
Mayville State	1	–	2	–	1	?	–	?	–	?
Dickinson State	1	–	3	–	0	2	–	4	–	0
Ellendale	1	–	3	–	0	?	–	?	–	?
Park Region	0	–	4	–	0	?	–	?	–	?
$ – Conference champion

1928 Iowa Conference football standings
	Conf.					Overall
Team	W		L		T	W		L		T
Iowa State Teachers $	4	–	0	–	2	5	–	1	–	3
Morningside	2	–	0	–	0	5	–	4	–	0
Luther	5	–	2	–	0	6	–	2	–	0
Penn (IA)	4	–	2	–	0	4	–	4	–	0
Des Moines	3	–	2	–	0	4	–	4	–	1
Iowa Wesleyan	3	–	2	–	0	5	–	3	–	0
Buena Vista	3	–	2	–	0	5	–	3	–	1
Simpson (IA)	3	–	2	–	1	4	–	4	–	1
St. Ambrose	2	–	2	–	1	2	–	4	–	2
Parsons	2	–	2	–	2	3	–	3	–	3
Western Union	1	–	2	–	0	4	–	5	–	0
Upper Iowa	1	–	3	–	1	1	–	3	–	1
Columbia (IA)	0	–	4	–	1	2	–	5	–	1
Central (IA)	0	–	8	–	0	0	–	8	–	0
$ – Conference champion

1928 Kansas Collegiate Athletic Conference football standings
	Conf.					Overall
Team	W		L		T	W		L		T
Baker $	5	–	0	–	2	6	–	0	–	2
Bethany (KS)	5	–	1	–	0	5	–	3	–	0
Kansas Wesleyan	5	–	1	–	1	6	–	2	–	1
St. Benedict's	4	–	1	–	1	4	–	3	–	1
Sterling	3	–	2	–	1	4	–	3	–	1
St. Mary's (KS)	2	–	2	–	3	2	–	3	–	3
Friends	3	–	4	–	0	3	–	6	–	0
McPherson	1	–	5	–	1	1	–	6	–	1
Ottawa	0	–	6	–	1	0	–	7	–	1
Bethel (KS)	0	–	6	–	0	0	–	7	–	0
$ – Conference champion

1928 Metropolitan Collegiate Conference football standings
	Conf.					Overall
Team	W		L		T	W		L		T
Brooklyn City College $	3	–	0	–	1	5	–	2	–	1
Long Island	2	–	1	–	1	5	–	3	–	1
Cooper Union	2	–	2	–	0	2	–	6	–	0
Wagner College	1	–	2	–	1	1	–	3	–	1
New York Aggies	0	–	3	–	1	1	–	5	–	1
$ – Conference champion

1928 Michigan Collegiate Conference football standings
	Conf.					Overall
Team	W		L		T	W		L		T
Michigan State Normal $	3	–	0	–	0	7	–	1	–	0
Western State Teachers	2	–	1	–	0	5	–	2	–	0
Central State (MI)	1	–	2	–	0	6	–	3	–	0
Detroit City College	0	–	3	–	0	2	–	5	–	1
$ – Conference champion

1928 Michigan Intercollegiate Athletic Association football standings
	Conf.					Overall
Team	W		L		T	W		L		T
Albion $	5	–	0	–	0	8	–	0	–	0
Kalamazoo	3	–	1	–	1	3	–	3	–	2
Alma	3	–	2	–	0	3	–	4	–	0
Hillsdale	0	–	2	–	3	1	–	3	–	3
Hope	0	–	3	–	2	1	–	3	–	2
Olivet	0	–	3	–	2	1	–	4	–	3
$ – Conference champion

1928 Midwest Conference football standings
	Conf.					Overall
Team	W		L		T	W		L		T
Coe $	4	–	0	–	1	6	–	1	–	1
Hamline	1	–	0	–	0	4	–	3	–	1
Carleton	2	–	1	–	1	3	–	2	–	2
Ripon	2	–	1	–	0	4	–	3	–	0
Monmouth (IL)	2	–	1	–	0	6	–	3	–	0
Knox	2	–	2	–	0	3	–	5	–	0
Beloit	1	–	3	–	0	3	–	4	–	1
Cornell (IA)	1	–	4	–	0	1	–	7	–	1
Lawrence	0	–	3	–	0	1	–	5	–	1
$ – Conference champion

1928 Minnesota Intercollegiate Athletic Conference football standings
	Conf.					Overall
Team	W		L		T	W		L		T
Saint Mary's (MN) +	3	–	1	–	0	5	–	2	–	0
Augsburg +	3	–	1	–	2	4	–	1	–	2
Concordia (MN)	2	–	1	–	2	3	–	1	–	2
Hamline	3	–	2	–	1	4	–	3	–	1
Gustavus Adolphus	4	–	3	–	0	4	–	3	–	0
Saint John's (MN)	1	–	2	–	1	3	–	2	–	1
Macalester	2	–	4	–	0	3	–	4	–	0
St. Thomas (MN)	1	–	3	–	1	2	–	5	–	1
St. Olaf	1	–	3	–	1	1	–	5	–	1
+ – Conference co-champions

1928 Mississippi Valley Conference football standings
	Conf.					Overall
Team	W		L		T	W		L		T
Murray State $	6	–	0	–	0	9	–	0	–	1
West Tennessee State Teachers	4	–	1	–	1	5	–	3	–	2
Bethel (TN)	3	–	1	–	2	4	–	3	–	2
Lambuth	3	–	3	–	0	4	–	5	–	0
Delta State	2	–	2	–	0	6	–	2	–	0
Tennessee Junior	2	–	4	–	0	2	–	6	–	0
Jonesboro College	1	–	3	–	1	1	–	6	–	1
Will Mayfield	1	–	3	–	0	1	–	7	–	1
Sunflower Junior	0	–	2	–	0	0	–	2	–	0
Bethel (KY)	0	–	3	–	0	0	–	6	–	0
$ – Conference champion

1928 Missouri College Athletic Union football standings
	Conf.					Overall
Team	W		L		T	W		L		T
Central (MO) $	6	–	0	–	0	8	–	2	–	0
Missouri Valley	4	–	1	–	1	6	–	1	–	1
Westminster (MO)	3	–	1	–	1	6	–	2	–	1
Missouri Mines	1	–	1	–	1	3	–	4	–	1
William Jewell	2	–	3	–	0	3	–	5	–	1
Tarkio	1	–	3	–	0	3	–	6	–	1
Drury	1	–	3	–	1	1	–	4	–	1
Culver–Stockton	1	–	4	–	0	1	–	5	–	1
Central Wesleyan	1	–	4	–	0	1	–	5	–	0
$ – Conference champion

1928 Missouri Intercollegiate Athletic Association football standings
	Conf.					Overall
Team	W		L		T	W		L		T
Springfield (MO) +	3	–	0	–	1	7	–	1	–	1
Kirksville +	3	–	0	–	1	7	–	2	–	1
Warrensburg	1	–	2	–	1	4	–	2	–	2
Maryville (MO)	1	–	2	–	1	5	–	3	–	1
Cape Girardeau	0	–	4	–	0	1	–	5	–	1
+ – Conference co-champions

1928 Missouri Valley Conference football standings
	Conf.					Overall
Team	W		L		T	W		L		T
Drake $	3	–	0	–	0	7	–	1	–	0
Creighton	2	–	1	–	0	3	–	5	–	1
Grinnell	1	–	2	–	0	4	–	3	–	1
Oklahoma A&M	0	–	1	–	0	1	–	7	–	0
Washington University	0	–	2	–	0	2	–	5	–	1
$ – Conference champion

1928 Nebraska College Athletic Conference football standings
	Conf.					Overall
Team	W		L		T	W		L		T
Hastings $	5	–	0	–	1	7	–	1	–	1
Doane	3	–	1	–	1	4	–	2	–	1
Midland	3	–	1	–	2	5	–	1	–	2
Nebraska Wesleyan	2	–	1	–	2	5	–	2	–	2
Cotner	3	–	3	–	0	4	–	4	–	0
Grand Island	1	–	3	–	1	1	–	7	–	1
York (NE)	1	–	4	–	1	1	–	5	–	2
Nebraska Central	0	–	6	–	0	1	–	6	–	0
$ – Conference champion

1928 Nebraska Intercollegiate Athletic Association football standings
	Conf.					Overall
Team	W		L		T	W		L		T
Peru Normal $	3	–	0	–	0	6	–	1	–	1
Omaha	2	–	1	–	0	4	–	3	–	1
Chadron Normal	1	–	1	–	0	5	–	2	–	0
Kearney Normal	1	–	1	–	0	4	–	5	–	0
Dana	0	–	1	–	0	1	–	5	–	1
Wayne Normal	0	–	3	–	0	0	–	7	–	0
$ – Conference champion

1928 New England Conference football standings
	Conf.					Overall
Team	W		L		T	W		L		T
Maine +	2	–	0	–	1	4	–	1	–	2
Connecticut +	1	–	0	–	2	4	–	1	–	3
New Hampshire	1	–	1	–	1	3	–	2	–	3
Rhode Island State	0	–	3	–	0	2	–	7	–	0
Massachusetts	0	–	0	–	0	2	–	5	–	1
+ – Conference co-champions

1928 New York State Conference football standings
	Conf.					Overall
Team	W		L		T	W		L		T
Niagara $	4	–	0	–	0	4	–	4	–	0
Rochester	3	–	0	–	1	5	–	2	–	1
Hamilton	2	–	0	–	1	5	–	2	–	1
Hobart	3	–	1	–	0	5	–	4	–	0
St. Lawrence	2	–	1	–	0	3	–	3	–	0
Alfred	1	–	4	–	0	2	–	7	–	0
Clarkson	1	–	5	–	0	1	–	7	–	0
Buffalo	0	–	5	–	0	1	–	6	–	0
$ – Conference champion

1928 North Central Conference football standings
	Conf.					Overall
Team	W		L		T	W		L		T
North Dakota $	4	–	0	–	0	6	–	1	–	1
South Dakota State	3	–	1	–	0	9	–	1	–	0
Morningside	1	–	3	–	0	5	–	4	–	0
North Dakota Agricultural	1	–	3	–	0	3	–	4	–	1
South Dakota	1	–	3	–	0	3	–	5	–	0
$ – Conference champion

1928 Northwest Conference football standings
	Conf.					Overall
Team	W		L		T	W		L		T
Whitman $	4	–	0	–	0	5	–	4	–	0
Puget Sound	3	–	2	–	0	5	–	3	–	0
College of Idaho	3	–	2	–	0	4	–	4	–	0
Willamette	2	–	3	–	0	3	–	5	–	0
Pacific (OR)	2	–	3	–	0	2	–	6	–	0
Linfield	0	–	4	–	0	1	–	6	–	0
$ – Conference champion

1928 Northwest Ohio League football standings
	Conf.					Overall
Team	W		L		T	W		L		T
Bowling Green $	3	–	0	–	1	5	–	0	–	2
Defiance	2	–	1	–	1	3	–	3	–	2
Bluffton	2	–	2	–	0	3	–	2	–	1
Findlay	1	–	3	–	0	2	–	6	–	0
Toledo	1	–	3	–	0	1	–	6	–	0
$ – Conference champion

1928 Ohio Athletic Conference football standings
	Conf.					Overall
Team	W		L		T	W		L		T
Heidelberg $	6	–	0	–	1	6	–	0	–	1
Mount Union	4	–	2	–	0	4	–	5	–	0
Muskingum	4	–	2	–	1	4	–	4	–	1
Oberlin	3	–	2	–	1	4	–	3	–	1
Wooster	2	–	2	–	2	2	–	4	–	2
Akron	3	–	4	–	0	5	–	4	–	0
Hiram	3	–	4	–	0	4	–	4	–	0
Otterbein	3	–	4	–	0	3	–	5	–	0
Ohio Northern	2	–	3	–	0	2	–	6	–	1
Case	1	–	4	–	1	2	–	6	–	1
Capital	1	–	5	–	0	1	–	6	–	1
St. Xavier	0	–	1	–	0	7	–	2	–	0
Baldwin–Wallace	0	–	8	–	0	0	–	8	–	0
Kenyon	0	–	5	–	0	0	–	7	–	0
Western Reserve *	8	–	0	–	0	8	–	0	–	0
Marietta *	4	–	0	–	0	4	–	2	–	1
Dayton *	2	–	0	–	0	6	–	3	–	0
$ – Conference champion; * – did not compete for championship

1928 Oklahoma Intercollegiate Conference football standings
	Conf.					Overall
Team	W		L		T	W		L		T
Phillips $	5	–	1	–	1	7	–	1	–	1
Oklahoma Baptist	4	–	1	–	2	5	–	2	–	2
Tulsa	3	–	1	–	1	7	–	2	–	1
Northeastern State	2	–	1	–	2	4	–	1	–	2
Central State Teachers	3	–	2	–	1	5	–	3	–	1
East Central	3	–	2	–	2	4	–	3	–	2
Oklahoma City	2	–	2	–	1	6	–	2	–	1
Southwestern State	2	–	2	–	2	5	–	2	–	2
Northwestern Oklahoma State	1	–	6	–	0	2	–	6	–	0
Southeastern Oklahoma State	0	–	7	–	0	2	–	8	–	0
$ – Conference champion

1928 Smoky Mountain Conference football standings
	Conf.					Overall
Team	W		L		T	W		L		T
Emory and Henry $	4	–	0	–	0	10	–	0	–	0
Maryville (TN)	3	–	0	–	0	6	–	2	–	1
Tusculum	2	–	2	–	1	4	–	2	–	2
King	2	–	3	–	0	3	–	5	–	0
Milligan	1	–	3	–	0	4	–	4	–	0
Carson–Newman	0	–	4	–	1	1	–	6	–	1
$ – Conference champion

1928 Southern California Conference football standings
	Conf.					Overall
Team	W		L		T	W		L		T
Occidental $	5	–	1	–	0	7	–	3	–	0
Caltech	4	–	1	–	1	5	–	3	–	1
Pomona	4	–	1	–	0	4	–	3	–	0
San Diego State	2	–	3	–	0	3	–	3	–	0
Whittier	2	–	3	–	1	3	–	4	–	1
Redlands	1	–	4	–	0	3	–	5	–	0
La Verne	0	–	5	–	0	0	–	6	–	0
$ – Conference champion

1928 Southern Intercollegiate Athletic Association football standings
	Conf.					Overall
Team	W		L		T	W		L		T
Chattanooga $	8	–	1	–	0	8	–	2	–	0
Mississippi College	6	–	1	–	2	7	–	1	–	2
Western Kentucky State Normal	5	–	1	–	0	8	–	1	–	0
Southern College	4	–	1	–	0	5	–	2	–	1
Transylvania	4	–	1	–	0	8	–	3	–	0
Wofford	5	–	2	–	0	7	–	2	–	1
Furman	3	–	1	–	0	5	–	4	–	0
Millsaps	4	–	2	–	1	5	–	3	–	1
Howard (AL)	4	–	2	–	1	6	–	4	–	1
Centenary	2	–	1	–	1	6	–	3	–	2
Louisiana College	2	–	1	–	0	3	–	5	–	0
The Citadel	4	–	3	–	0	6	–	3	–	1
Southwestern (TN)	2	–	2	–	0	6	–	4	–	0
Birmingham–Southern	2	–	2	–	3	3	–	2	–	4
Mercer	2	–	2	–	1	3	–	5	–	1
Georgetown (KY)	3	–	3	–	0	3	–	6	–	0
SW Louisiana	3	–	4	–	0	4	–	5	–	0
Kentucky Wesleyan	2	–	3	–	0	6	–	3	–	0
Stetson	2	–	3	–	0	4	–	3	–	0
Newberry	2	–	3	–	0	3	–	5	–	0
Spring Hill	2	–	3	–	1	2	–	5	–	1
Oglethorpe	1	–	2	–	0	3	–	5	–	1
Presbyterian	2	–	5	–	0	4	–	6	–	0
Louisiana Normal	1	–	3	–	0	5	–	4	–	0
Union (TN)	2	–	6	–	0	3	–	7	–	0
Centre	1	–	3	–	0	2	–	8	–	0
Louisiana Tech	1	–	6	–	0	2	–	7	–	0
Rollins	0	–	3	–	0	0	–	4	–	0
Louisville	0	–	4	–	0	1	–	7	–	0
Erskine	0	–	5	–	0	2	–	7	–	0
$ – Conference champion

1928 Southern Intercollegiate Athletic Conference football standings
	Conf.					Overall
Team	W		L		T	W		L		T
Tuskegee	5	–	1	–	2	6	–	1	–	4
Clark (GA)	5	–	1	–	1	6	–	1	–	1
Atlanta	4	–	1	–	1	5	–	2	–	2
Fisk	4	–	1	–	0	5	–	2	–	2
Knoxville	2	–	1	–	3	3	–	2	–	4
Morris Brown	3	–	2	–	1	4	–	2	–	1
Alabama State	4	–	3	–	1	5	–	4	–	1
Morehouse	2	–	3	–	0	4	–	5	–	1
Tennessee State	1	–	4	–	0	2	–	4	–	0
Talladega	1	–	4	–	1	1	–	5	–	1
Florida A&M	0	–	4	–	0	0	–	4	–	1
Miles	0	–	6	–	0	2	–	7	–	0
No conference champion was recognized.

1928 Southwestern Athletic Conference football standings
	Conf.					Overall
Team	W		L		T	W		L		T
Wiley $	5	–	0	–	0	9	–	0	–	1
Bishop	4	–	1	–	0	7	–	1	–	0
Prairie View	3	–	2	–	0	5	–	3	–	1
Samuel Huston	2	–	3	–	0	?	–	?	–	?
Paul Quinn	1	–	4	–	0	?	–	?	–	?
Texas College	0	–	5	–	0	?	–	?	–	?
$ – Conference champion

1928 South Dakota Intercollegiate Conference football standings
	Conf.					Overall
Team	W		L		T	W		L		T
Spearfish +	4	–	0	–	0	5	–	2	–	0
Huron +	2	–	0	–	2	4	–	1	–	2
Sioux Falls	3	–	1	–	1	3	–	2	–	1
Yankton	2	–	1	–	2	3	–	2	–	2
Augustana (SD)	3	–	2	–	0	3	–	4	–	1
Southern Normal	3	–	2	–	2	3	–	3	–	2
Columbus (SD)	2	–	2	–	0	5	–	3	–	0
Northern Normal	2	–	2	–	1	2	–	2	–	1
South Dakota Mines	2	–	3	–	0	3	–	5	–	0
Eastern Normal	1	–	5	–	0	2	–	6	–	0
Dakota Wesleyan	0	–	6	–	0	0	–	9	–	0
+ – Conference co-champions; Spearfish and South Dakota Mines played twice. The second game was not counted in the conference standings.

1928 Texas Conference football standings
	Conf.					Overall
Team	W		L		T	W		L		T
Howard Payne $	5	–	0	–	0	10	–	1	–	0
St. Edward's	3	–	1	–	0	6	–	5	–	0
Austin	2	–	2	–	0	4	–	6	–	0
Simmons (TX)	2	–	3	–	0	6	–	6	–	1
Southwestern (TX)	2	–	3	–	0	5	–	4	–	0
Trinity (TX)	0	–	5	–	0	2	–	8	–	0
$ – Conference champion

1928 Texas Intercollegiate Athletic Association football standings
	Conf.					Overall
Team	W		L		T	W		L		T
Daniel Baker $	4	–	0	–	0	5	–	3	–	2
McMurry	4	–	1	–	0	6	–	3	–	0
Abilene Christian	4	–	1	–	0	5	–	4	–	0
Sam Houston State	3	–	2	–	0	5	–	5	–	0
North Texas State Teachers	2	–	2	–	0	4	–	5	–	0
East Texas State	3	–	4	–	0	3	–	5	–	0
Southwest Texas State	2	–	3	–	0	2	–	7	–	0
West Texas State	0	–	4	–	0	2	–	7	–	0
Stephen F. Austin	0	–	5	–	0	1	–	9	–	0
$ – Conference champion

1928 Tri-State Conference football standings
	Conf.					Overall
Team	W		L		T	W		L		T
Duquesne +	4	–	1	–	0	8	–	1	–	0
Westminster (PA) +	4	–	1	–	0	4	–	5	–	0
Geneva	3	–	1	–	0	5	–	5	–	0
Bethany (WV)	0	–	2	–	1	1	–	6	–	1
Thiel	0	–	3	–	1	1	–	6	–	2
Waynesburg	0	–	3	–	1	0	–	6	–	2
+ – Conference co-champions

1928 Virginia Conference football standings
	Conf.					Overall
Team	W		L		T	W		L		T
Emory and Henry $	3	–	0	–	0	10	–	0	–	0
William & Mary	5	–	1	–	0	6	–	3	–	2
Roanoke	3	–	2	–	1	4	–	4	–	1
Lynchburg	3	–	3	–	0	5	–	4	–	0
Richmond	2	–	3	–	1	3	–	4	–	2
Hampden–Sydney	2	–	3	–	0	3	–	6	–	0
Bridgewater	0	–	2	–	1	0	–	6	–	1
Randolph–Macon	0	–	4	–	1	0	–	7	–	1
$ – Conference champion

1928 West Virginia Athletic Conference football standings
	Conf.					Overall
Team	W		L		T	W		L		T
Marshall $	5	–	0	–	0	8	–	1	–	1
Potomac State	4	–	0	–	1	5	–	1	–	1
New River State	5	–	1	–	1	5	–	1	–	1
Salem	4	–	2	–	0	5	–	3	–	0
West Virginia Wesleyan	3	–	2	–	0	5	–	6	–	0
Concord	4	–	3	–	0	4	–	3	–	1
Glenville State	3	–	3	–	1	4	–	3	–	1
Broaddus	2	–	6	–	0	2	–	8	–	0
Alderson	1	–	4	–	0	1	–	6	–	0
Fairmont State	1	–	5	–	1	1	–	5	–	1
Morris Harvey	1	–	6	–	0	2	–	9	–	0
Davis & Elkins *	3	–	0	–	0	7	–	2	–	1
Bethany (WV) *	1	–	2	–	0	1	–	6	–	1
Shepherd *	0	–	2	–	0	4	–	4	–	0
$ – Conference champion; * – Did not qualify for conference standings Ties did not count in conference standings.

1928 Wisconsin State Teachers College Conference football standings
	Conf.					Overall
Team	W		L		T	W		L		T
Stevens Point State +	3	–	0	–	1	5	–	0	–	1
Superior State +	3	–	0	–	1	6	–	0	–	2
Oshkosh State +	3	–	0	–	2	5	–	1	–	2
River Falls State	3	–	1	–	1	5	–	1	–	1
Whitewater State	2	–	1	–	1	4	–	1	–	1
Milwaukee State	2	–	2	–	0	4	–	2	–	2
La Crosse State	2	–	2	–	1	3	–	2	–	1
Stout Institute	1	–	4	–	1	2	–	5	–	1
Eau Claire State	0	–	4	–	0	0	–	5	–	0
Platteville State	0	–	5	–	0	0	–	6	–	0
+ – Conference co-champions

== Rankings ==
=== Champions (per rankings) ===
Various different rankings (using differing methodologies) have identified Detroit, Georgia Tech, or the University of Southern California as the season's champion.

- Berryman QPRS: Georgia Tech
- Billingsley Report: Georgia Tech
- Boand System: Georgia Tech
- College Football Researchers Association: Georgia Tech
- Parke H. Davis (Note: for Spalding's Official Foot Ball Guide): Detroit and Georgia Tech (co-champions)
- Dickinson System: University of Southern California
- Helms Athletic Foundation: Georgia Tech
- Houlgate System: Georgia Tech
- National Championship Foundation: Georgia Tech
- Poling System: Georgia Tech
- Sagarin Ratings Elo chess method: Georgia Tech
- Sagarin Ratings Predictor method: University of Southern California

Note: besides the Dickinson System and Houlgate System, all 1928 rankings were given retroactively

=== Dickinson System ranking ===
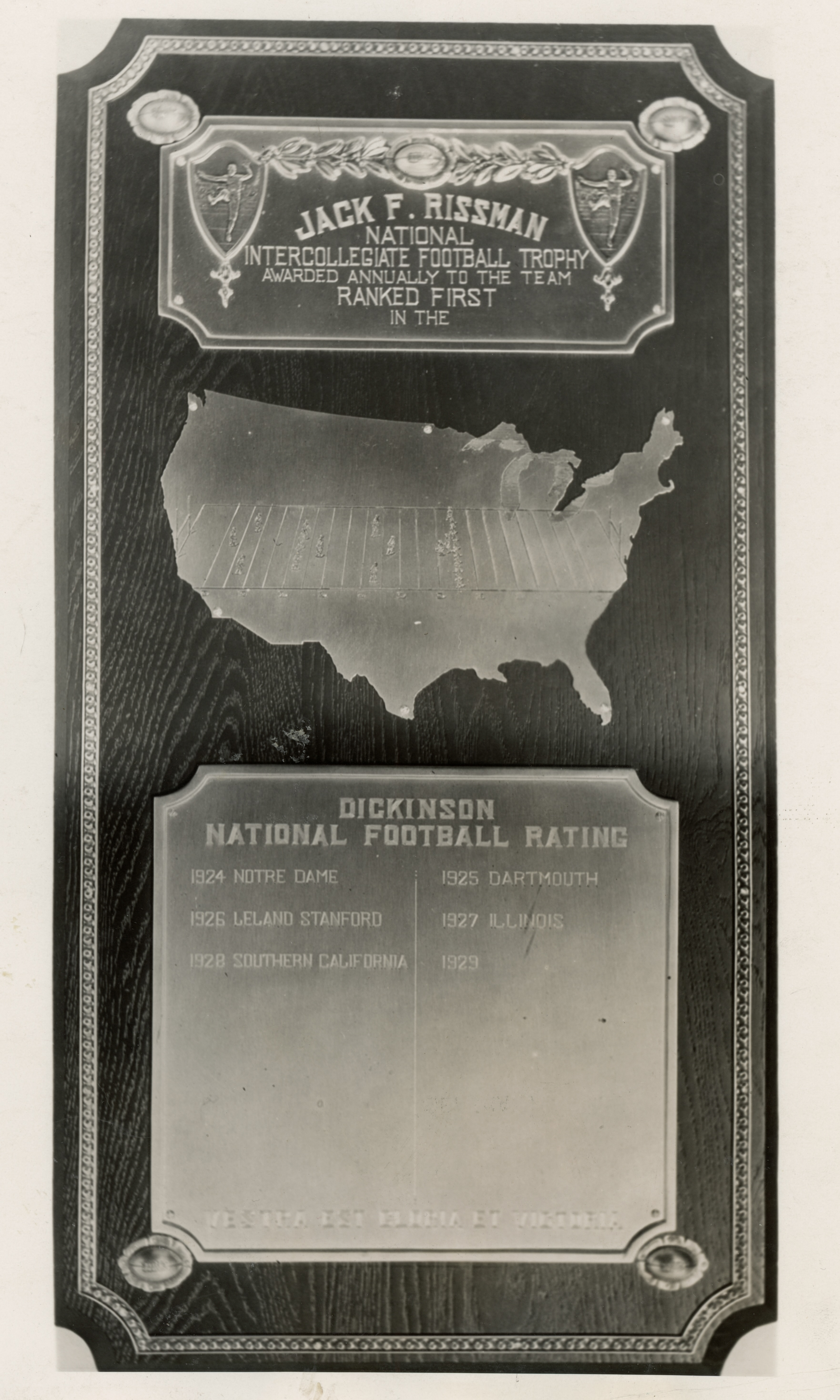
Jack F. Rissman National Intercollegiate Football Trophy — Awarded annually to the team ranked first in the Dickinson National Football Rating

Frank G. Dickinson, an economics professor at the University of Illinois, had invented the Dickinson System to rank colleges based upon their records and the strength of their opposition. The system was originally designed to rank teams in the Big Nine (later the Big Ten) conference. Chicago clothing manufacturer Jack Rissman then persuaded Dickinson to rank the nation's teams under the system, and awarded the Rissman Trophy to the winning university.

The system awarded 30 points for a win over a "strong team", and 20 for a win over a "weak team". Losses were awarded points (15 for loss to a strong team, 10 for loss to a weak team). Ties were treated as half a win and half a loss (22.5 for a tie with a strong team, 15 for a tie with a weak team). An average was then derived by dividing the points by games played.

Professor Dickinson concluded that the University of Southern California Trojans were "the national football champions of America for 1928". Unbeaten and untied Georgia Tech was ranked third because, Dickinson said, "its schedule was easier than the other contenders". On January 4, 1929, the Jack F. Rissman national intercollegiate trophy was presented by Professor Dickinson to the USC football squad, and Coach Howard Jones, at a student rally on the Los Angeles campus. For the benefit of the crowd, Dickinson added "that even had he taken into consideration the victory of Georgia Tech over California on New Year's Day that the University of Southern California would have still be rated at the top," though Georgia Tech would have ranked second instead of third after its Rose Bowl win

Rank	Team	Record	Rating
1	USC	9–0–1	24.13
2	California	6–1–2	22.50
3	Georgia Tech	9–0	20.00
4 (t)	Stanford	8–3–1	19.17
4 (t)	Wisconsin	7–1–1	19.17
6 (t)	Carnegie Tech	7–1	18.33
6 (t)	Iowa	6–2	18.33
8	Illinois	7–1	18.33
9	Army	8–2	17.50
10	NYU	8–2	16.25
11	Penn	8–1	15.00

== Awards and honors ==
=== All-Americans ===
The consensus All-America team included:

Position	Name	Height	Weight (lbs.)	Class	Hometown	Team
QB	Howard Harpster	6'1"	160	Sr.	Salem, Ohio	Carnegie Tech
HB	Chris Cagle	5'9"	167	Jr.	De Ridder, Louisiana	Army
HB	Chuck Carroll	6'0"	190	Sr.	Seattle, Washington	Washington
HB	Paul Scull	5'8"	185	Sr.	Lower Merion, Pennsylvania	Penn
FB	Ken Strong	6'1"	201	Sr.	West Haven, Connecticut	NYU
E	Irvine Phillips	6'1"	188	Sr.	Salinas, California	California
T	Otto Pommerening	5'11"	178	Sr.	Ann Arbor, Michigan	Michigan
G	Seraphim Post	6'0"	190	Jr.	Berkeley, California	Stanford
G	Don Robesky	5'11"	198	Sr.	Bakersfield, California	Stanford
C	Peter Pund	6'0"	182	Sr.	Augusta, Georgia	Georgia Tech
G	Edward Burke	6'0"	180	Sr.	Larksville, Pennsylvania	Navy
T	Mike Getto	6'2"	198	Sr.	Irwin, Pennsylvania	Pittsburgh
E	Wes Fesler	6'0"	185	So.	Youngstown, Ohio	Ohio State

=== Statistical leaders ===
- Team scoring most points: Florida, 336 to 44.
- Player scoring most points: Ken Strong, NYU, 162
- Total offense leader: Ken Strong, NYU, 3000
