= Thomas Connell =

Thomas or Tom Connell may refer to:

- Thomas Connell (cricketer) (1869–?), New Zealand and Australian cricketer
- Thomas H. Connell III (1942–2010), stage manager of the Metropolitan Opera
- Tom Connell (American football), American football player
- Tom Connell (footballer) (born 1957), Northern Irish footballer
