= 1928 College of Emporia Fighting Presbies football team =

American college football season

1928 College of Emporia Fighting Presbies football
- Conference: Central Intercollegiate Conference
- Record: 8–0 (6–0 CIC)
- Head coach: L. T. Harr (1st season)
- Captain: Lester Selves
- Home stadium: Schaffner Field

1928 Central Intercollegiate Conference football standings
	Conf.					Overall
Team	W		L		T	W		L		T
College of Emporia $	6	–	0	–	0	8	–	0	–	0
Emporia Teachers	4	–	1	–	1	6	–	1	–	1
Southwestern (KS)	3	–	1	–	2	4	–	3	–	2
Hays Teachers	3	–	2	–	1	3	–	3	–	2
Wichita	2	–	4	–	0	3	–	5	–	0
Washburn	1	–	5	–	0	2	–	7	–	0
Pittsburg State	0	–	6	–	0	0	–	7	–	0
$ – Conference champion

The 1928 College of Emporia Fighting Presbies football team represented the College of Emporia as a member of the Central Intercollegiate Conference (CIC) during the 1928 college football season. Led by first-year head coach L. T. Harr, the Fighting Presbies compiled an overall record of 8–0 with a mark of 6–0 in conference play, winning the CIC title. The College of Emporia did not allow a single point all season.

== Schedule ==
Date	Time	Opponent	Site	Result	Attendance	Source
October 6		Southwestern (KS)	Emporia, KS	W 19–0		
October 13		at Washburn	Topeka, KS	W 20–0		
October 20	2:30 p.m.	vs. Westminster (MO)*	Muehlebach Field; Kansas City, MO	W 13–0		
October 26		Kirksville Osteopaths*	Shaffner Field; Emporia, KS	W 25–0		
November 3		at Pittsburg State	Brandenburg Field; Pittsburg, KS	W 20–0		
November 9		Hays Teachers	Emporia, KS	W 33–0		
November 17		at Wichita	Island Park; Wichita, KS	W 27–0		
November 29		Emporia Teachers	?; Emporia, KS	W 18–0	5,000	
*Non-conference game; All times are in Central time
