= Sam H. Hill =

American sports coach (1898–1978)

Biographical details
- Born: November 20, 1898; Ludlow, Illinois, U.S.
- Died: March 14, 1978 (aged 79); Clearwater, Florida, U.S.

Playing career

Football
- 1922: Illinois
- Position: Halfback

Coaching career (HC unless noted)

Football
- 1923–1924: Fairmount
- 1925–1926: Wesleyan
- 1927: Rollins
- 1928–1929: Wichita

Basketball
- 1923–1925: Fairmount

Administrative career (AD unless noted)
- 1923–1925: Fairmount
- 1927–1928: Rollins
- 1928–1930: Wichita

Head coaching record
- Overall: 20–29–5 (football)

Samuel Houston Hill (November 20, 1898 – March 14, 1978) was an American college football and college basketball coach and athletics administrator.

== Early life ==
Hill was born in Ludlow, Illinois. He was the youngest of six children born to Harriet and William Hill.

== Coaching career ==
=== Wichita State ===
Hill was the 14th head football coach for Fairmont College and the University of Wichita (now Wichita State University) located in Wichita, Kansas and he held that position for four seasons, from 1923 to 1924 and again from 1928 to 1929, compiling a record of 14–4–5. This ranks him ninth at Wichita State in terms of total wins and 14th at Wichita State in terms of winning percentage. Fairmount College became the Municipal University of Wichita in 1926.

=== Wesleyan ===
Hill also served as the head football coach at Wesleyan University from 1925 to 1926, compiling a record of 5–10.

== Later life and death ==
Hill was later director of labor relations for the truck division of General Motors. He moved from Royal Oak, Michigan to retire in Clearwater, Florida, where he lived for 12 years before dying on March 14, 1978.

== Head coaching record ==
=== Football ===
| Year | Team | Overall | Conference | Standing | Bowl/playoffs |
|---|---|---|---|---|---|
Fairmount Wheatshockers (Kansas Collegiate Athletic Conference) (1923–1924)
| 1923 | Fairmount | 2–4–2 | 2–2–2 | T–8th | |
| 1924 | Fairmount | 6–2–1 | 5–2–1 | 4th | |
Wesleyan Methodists (Independent) (1925–1926)
| 1925 | Wesleyan | 2–5 | | | |
| 1926 | Wesleyan | 3–5 | | | |
| Wesleyan: | | 5–10 | | | |
Rollins Tars (Independent) (1927)
| 1927 | Rollins | 1–5 | | | |
| Rollins: | | 1–5 | | | |
Wichita Shockers (Central Intercollegiate Conference) (1928–1929)
| 1928 | Wichita | 3–5 | 2–4 | 5th | |
| 1929 | Wichita | 3–3–2 | 2–2–2 | T–3rd | |
| Fairmount/Wichita: | | 14–14–5 | 11–10–5 | | |
| Total: | | 20–29–5 | | | |
