= 1928 Nebraska Cornhuskers football team =

American college football season

1928 Nebraska Cornhuskers football

Big 6 champion
- Conference: Big Six Conference
- Record: 7–1–1 (5–0 Big 6)
- Head coach: Ernest Bearg (4th season)
- Home stadium: Memorial Stadium

1928 Big Six Conference football standings
	Conf.					Overall
Team	W		L		T	W		L		T
Nebraska $	5	–	0	–	0	7	–	1	–	1
Oklahoma	3	–	2	–	0	5	–	3	–	0
Missouri	3	–	2	–	0	4	–	4	–	0
Iowa State	2	–	2	–	1	2	–	5	–	1
Kansas	1	–	3	–	1	2	–	4	–	2
Kansas State	0	–	5	–	0	3	–	5	–	0
$ – Conference champion

The 1928 Nebraska Cornhuskers football team was an American football team that represented the University of Nebraska in the Big Six Conference during the 1928 college football season. In its fourth and final season under head coach Ernest Bearg, the team compiled a 7–1–1 record (5–0 against conference opponents), won the Big Six championship, and outscored opponents by a total of 144 to 31. The team played its home games at Memorial Stadium in Lincoln, Nebraska.

== Before the season ==
Coach Bearg's Cornhuskers had accomplished many feats, but had yet to put up a conference title banner during his tenure. The Missouri Valley Intercollegiate Athletic Association had split up following the 1927 season, with the smaller schools (Drake, Grinnell, Oklahoma A&M, and Washington (MO)) forming a new league, the similarly named Missouri Valley Conference. The schools which remained in the MVIAA (Iowa State, Kansas, Kansas State, Missouri, Nebraska, and Oklahoma) were henceforth commonly referred to as the Big Six Conference, although the league's name technically was not changed. The result was that the league no longer had teams from smaller schools which were typically easily overwhelmed by Nebraska. Securing a league title was now more difficult than ever.

== Schedule ==
Date	Time	Opponent	Site	Result	Attendance	Source
October 6	2:30 p.m.	at Iowa State	Clyde Williams Field; Ames, IA (rivalry)	W 12–0	5,884	
October 13	2:00 p.m.	Montana State*	Memorial Stadium; Lincoln, NE	W 26–6		
October 20	2:00 p.m.	Syracuse*	Memorial Stadium; Lincoln, NE	W 7–6	23,000	
October 27	2:00 p.m.	Missouri^{†}	Memorial Stadium; Lincoln, NE (rivalry)	W 24–0	38,000	
November 3	2:00 p.m.	at Kansas	Memorial Stadium; Lawrence, KS (rivalry)	W 20–0		
November 10	2:30 p.m.	at Oklahoma	Memorial Stadium; Norman, OK (rivalry)	W 44–6	26,000	
November 17	2:00 p.m.	Pittsburgh*	Memorial Stadium; Lincoln, NE	T 0–0	23,000	
November 24	1:00 p.m.	at Army*	Michie Stadium; West Point, NY	L 3–13		
November 29	2:00 p.m.	Kansas State	Memorial Stadium; Lincoln, NE (rivalry)	W 8–0	10,000	
*Non-conference game; ^{†}Homecoming; All times are in Central time

== Roster ==
Andrews, Ralph #15 FB; Ashburn, Clifford #37 E Broadstone, Marion #54 T Bushee, Charles #45 E Chaloupka, Howard #55 E Drath, Walter #40 G Eno, Gordon #56 T Farley, George #21 HB; Fisher, Morris #17 E Frahm, Harold #35 HB; Gallaway, William #47 G Greenberg, Elmer #46 G Holm, Elmer #31 G Howell, Edward #29 FB; James, Theodore #36 E Jeffries, Ralph #30 G Justice, Charles #48 G Lewandowski, Adolph #18 E Long, Andrew #32 HB; Lucas, Leroy #52 T Maasdam, Felber #24 C	McBride, Clark #13 HB; McMullen, Dan #66 G Morgan, Clifford #16 E Munn, Glenn #50 T Nelson, Clarence #20 HB; Parker, Jerry #34 FB; Peaker, Harold #11 QB; Phillips, Donald #57 C Prucka, Frank E Ray, George T Richards, Raymond #49 T Rowley, Claude #23 HB; Russell, Fay #53 QB; Scherzinger, Victor #22 FB; Simic, Adolph #25 E Sloan, Clair #26 FB; Urban, Willard #33 E Witte, Willard #19 QB; Wostoupel, Adrian #93 HB; Young, Robert HB; Zuver, Merle #42 G

== Coaching staff ==
Name	Title	First year in this position	Years at Nebraska	Alma mater
Ernest Bearg	Head Coach	1925	1925–1928	Washburn
Bill Day	Centers Coach	1928	1921–1925, 1928–1931	Nebraska
Leo Sherer	Ends Coach	1923	1923–1928	Nebraska
Charlie T. Black	Freshmen Coach	1926	1926–1930	
Bunny Oakes	Line Coach	1926	1926–1930	
R. G. Lehman	Assistant Freshmen Coach	1928	1928–1931	
John Rhodes	Backs Coach	1928	1928	Nebraska

== Game summaries ==
=== Iowa State ===
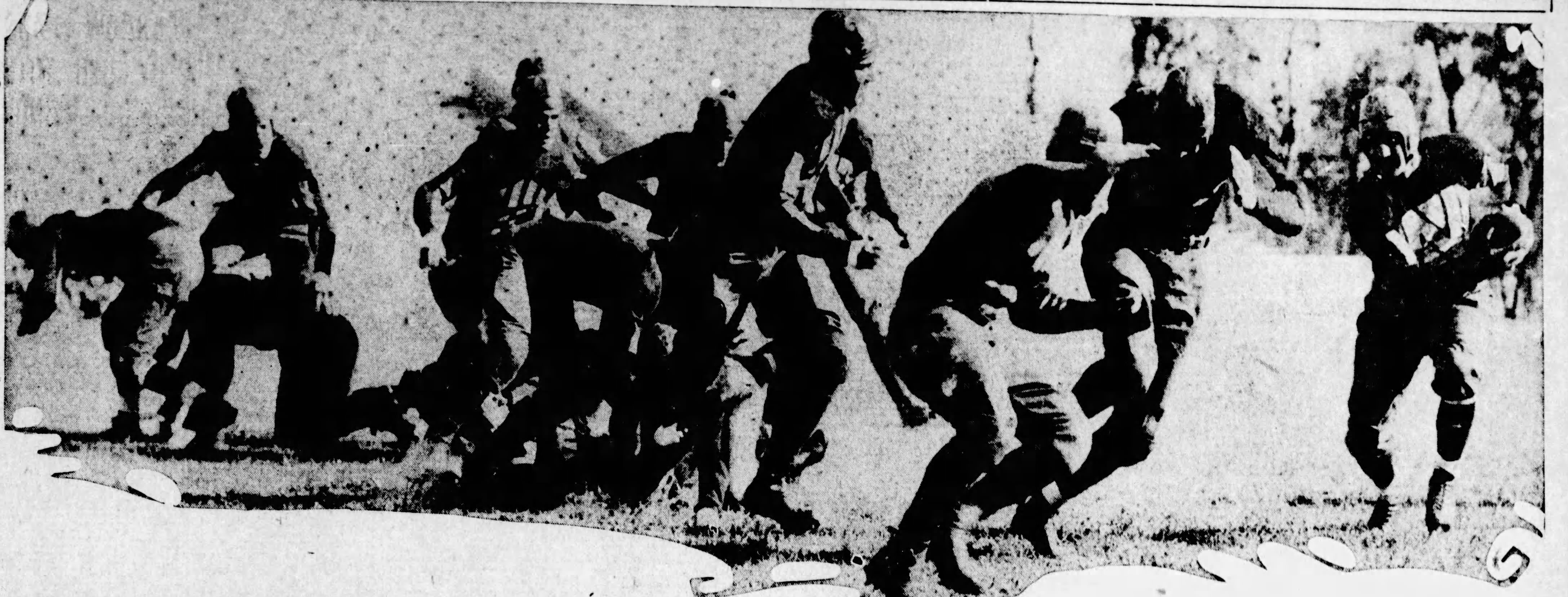
Blue Howell running the ball vs. Iowa State

Nebraska at Iowa State

Team	1	2	Total
• Nebraska			12
Iowa State			0

- Date: October 6
- Location: Clyde Williams Field • Ames, Iowa
- Game attendance: 5,884

Iowa State allowed the Cornhuskers just one touchdown in the first half, which was earned through fierce competition. After the break, the Cyclones continued to thwart Nebraska and made big gains of their own, yet somehow failed to turn any of their advances into points on the board. The Cornhuskers found the end zone one more time and finished the scoring, opening the conference slate in the new Big 6 with a shutout victory and pulling farther ahead of Iowa State in the series, 18–4–1.

=== Montana State ===
Montana State at Nebraska

Team	1	2	Total
Montana State			6
• Nebraska			26

- Date: October 13
- Location: Memorial Stadium • Lincoln, Nebraska

The Cornhuskers started off slowly in the home opener, managing to lead the Bobcats 13–6 at the half, but it was all Nebraska when the teams returned to the field. Montana State allowed several big key plays which handed all of the momentum to the Cornhuskers, who rolled off another 13 points and took the win in the first meeting of these teams.

=== Syracuse ===
Syracuse at Nebraska

Team	1	2	3	4	Total
Syracuse	0	6	0	0	6
• Nebraska	7	0	0	0	7

- Date: October 20
- Location: Memorial Stadium • Lincoln, Nebraska
- Game attendance: 23,000

Syracuse, long a source of frustration for the Cornhuskers, arrived in Lincoln to open Nebraska's non-conference slate. Both teams utilized extensive forward passes in a game of aerial attacks. Nebraska's first touchdown was countered not too long after by Syracuse before the half. Both teams fought back and forth in the second half but never found the scoreboard, and the game was ultimately decided by the successful Nebraska 1-point place kick in the first quarter, as the kick after the Orangemen's lone touchdown had failed. Nebraska at last had evened up the series at 3–3 against Syracuse all-time.

=== Missouri ===
Missouri at Nebraska

Team	1	2	3	4	Total
Missouri	0	0	0	0	0
• Nebraska	7	0	3	14	24

- Date: October 27
- Location: Memorial Stadium • Lincoln, Nebraska
- Game attendance: 38,000

In recognition of the established rivalry that had emerged between these teams in the recent years, the programs agreed to trade possession of a trophy, to be held by the current victor. An old bell (later to be known as the Victory Bell) was secured for this purpose, and was engraved with the score of the 1927 7–6 Missouri triumph. Not long before the kickoff, Missouri was presented with the bell.

It was an intense atmosphere as Missouri was unbeaten on the year, and still wearing the badge of three straight Cornhusker defeats. In front of a stadium and conference record crowd in Lincoln, at the Nebraska's homecoming game, the Cornhuskers took command of their destiny and made a strong push for the conference title by shutting the Tigers completely down. With only a 7–0 lead by the half, it looked to be a game, but as the game wore on the Cornhuskers rolled without opposition. Missouri's three-game win streak over Nebraska was snapped, and the Cornhuskers improved to 15–6–1 over the Tigers. The bell was then carried back across the field and turned over to Nebraska until such time that Missouri could secure a future win against the Cornhuskers.

=== Kansas ===
Nebraska at Kansas

Team	1	2	Total
• Nebraska			20
Kansas			0

- Date: November 3
- Location: Memorial Stadium • Lawrence, Kansas

Nebraska was 4–0 and had outscored the season's opponents 69–12 so far, and the contest in Lawrence was more of the same. It mattered little that Kansas, like Missouri before them, was unbeaten so far this year, as the Cornhuskers held Kansas back to start off, and then overpowered them on the way to a shutout victory in front of the Jayhawks' homecoming crowd. Nebraska had not yet allowed any conference foes to score a single point on them this season, and Kansas fell to 9–24–2 against the Cornhuskers all-time.

=== Oklahoma ===
Nebraska at Oklahoma

Team	1	2	Total
• Nebraska			44
Oklahoma			6

- Date: November 10
- Location: Oklahoma Memorial Stadium • Norman, Oklahoma
- Game attendance: 26,000

For the third straight game, Nebraska met an undefeated conference foe, and for the second straight game, it was the opponents' homecoming event. This game was different, however, in that the Sooners became the only Big 6 team to score on the Cornhuskers for the entire 1928 season. Unfortunately for Oklahoma, those 6 points were swept away by the Nebraska onslaught which racked up 44 points before time expired. With the victory, Nebraska advanced to 6–1–1 in the series.

=== Pittsburgh ===
Pittsburgh at Nebraska

Team	1	2	3	4	Total
Pittsburgh	0	0	0	0	0
Nebraska	0	0	0	0	0

- Date: November 17
- Location: Memorial Stadium • Lincoln, Nebraska
- Game attendance: 25,000

The Cornhuskers hoped to avenge the defeat handed to them by Pittsburgh last year, but the win would elude both teams on the muddy field that day. Nebraska was on its heels for much of the contest, failing to even get a first down in the course of the game as the plan of attack was primarily about defense. The Panthers, unable to score all day, were forced to settle for the scoreless tie. The series between these squads was left evenly matched at 1–1–1.

=== Army ===
Nebraska at Army

Team	1	2	3	4	Total
Nebraska	0	3	0	0	3
• Army	0	0	6	7	13

- Date: November 24
- Location: Michie Stadium • West Point, New York

The Cornhuskers traveled to West Point for the first ever meeting of the Cadets with any Big 6 team. The Army squad was an eastern team to be feared, carrying only one loss on their season to date, and it looked to be a major event as Nebraska itself was rolling along with just the scoreless tie of last week making any blemish on the record. The teams seemed evenly matched to start, and it wasn't until the 2nd quarter than Nebraska put the first points on the board. Settling back to hold the three-point lead, the Cornhuskers went into a strong defensive mode, but the Army squad found the end zone in the third quarter anyway. Night fell, and play was complicated by the darkness on the unlit field, yet Army managed one more late touchdown to firmly seal the game and hand the Cornhuskers their first and only loss of 1928.

=== Kansas State ===
Kansas State at Nebraska

Team	1	2	3	4	Total
Kansas State	0	0	0	0	0
• Nebraska	6	0	0	2	8

- Date: November 29
- Location: Memorial Stadium • Lincoln, Nebraska
- Game attendance: 10,000
- Game weather: Snow

Nebraska faced conference foe Kansas State in the final game of the year, closing out the season in a Lincoln snowstorm at Memorial Stadium. Nebraska made the first strike early in the first quarter and went on the prevent the Aggies from ever finding the scoreboard to catch up. As Kansas State eventually began to fold later in the game, the Cornhuskers tacked on a late safety to seal the outcome and push their commanding history over the Aggies to 12–0–1. With the win, Nebraska was unbeaten in conference play and clinched the league title.

== After the season ==
Coach Bearg finally obtained the league title after four previous attempts fell short, and when his squad finally did bring the banner home it was against a much tougher league than the MVIAA had been before evolving into the Big 6. Bearg, having secured the title, was offered the head coaching position at Washburn, his alma mater, and departed the Nebraska program after improving his final record in Lincoln to 23–7–3 (.742). Coach Bearg also left Nebraska's overall record improved at 220–74–20 (.732) and his perfect conference slate for 1928 helped improve Nebraska's league record to 54–8–5 (.843). Nebraska then set about the task of searching for their eighteenth head football coach.
