= 1928 Loyola Ramblers football team =

American college football season

1928 Loyola Ramblers football
- Conference: Independent
- Record: 4–4
- Head coach: Roger Kiley (6th season; games 1–2); Dan Lamont (games 3–8)
- Home stadium: Loyola Field; Soldier Field

1928 Midwestern college football independents records
	Conf.			Overall
Team	W	L	T	W		L		T
Detroit		–		9	–	0	–	0
Butler		–		6	–	2	–	0
John Carroll		–		6	–	3	–	0
Kent State		–		4	–	2	–	2
Marquette		–		5	–	3	–	1
Ball Teachers		–		3	–	2	–	2
Notre Dame		–		5	–	4	–	0
DePaul		–		4	–	4	–	1
Haskell		–		5	–	5	–	0
Michigan Tech		–		2	–	2	–	1
Saint Louis		–		4	–	4	–	1
Wabash		–		4	–	4	–	1
Loyola (IL)		–		4	–	4	–	0
Lombard		–		3	–	4	–	1
Michigan State		–		3	–	4	–	1
Detroit City College		–		2	–	5	–	1
Valparaiso		–		1	–	6	–	0

The 1928 Loyola Ramblers football team was an American football team that represented Loyola University Chicago as an independent during the 1928 college football season, and the Ramblers finished with a 4–4 record. In his sixth season as head coach, Roger Kiley resigned following their second game to return to a private law practice. Assistant coach Dan Lamont was appointed as head coach for the remainder of the season, and in December was retained as the full time head coach at Loyola.

== Schedule ==
Date	Opponent	Site	Result	Attendance	Source
September 29	at Millikin	Millikin Field; Decatur, IL	L 0–3		
October 6	at Northwestern reserves	Dyche Stadium; Evanston, IL	W 13–6		
October 13	vs. Haskell	Muehlebach Field; Kansas City, MO	L 0–6	5,000	
October 20	Lombard	Loyola Field; Chicago, IL	W 26–0		
November 3	at Dayton	University of Dayton Stadium; Dayton, OH	L 7–12		
November 10	at Saint Louis	Sportsman's Park; St. Louis, MO	W 7–0		
November 17	Quantico Marines	Soldier Field; Chicago, IL	L 6–13		
December 1	vs. DePaul	Soldier Field; Chicago, IL	W 7–0		
