= 1928 Phillips Haymakers football team =

American college football season

1928 Phillips Haymakers football

OIC champion
- Conference: Oklahoma Intercollegiate Conference
- Record: 7–1–1 (5–1–1 OIC)
- Head coach: Louis Wilke (2nd season)
- Captain: Denker
- Home stadium: Alton Field

1928 Oklahoma Intercollegiate Conference football standings
	Conf.					Overall
Team	W		L		T	W		L		T
Phillips $	5	–	1	–	1	7	–	1	–	1
Oklahoma Baptist	4	–	1	–	2	5	–	2	–	2
Tulsa	3	–	1	–	1	7	–	2	–	1
Northeastern State	2	–	1	–	2	4	–	1	–	2
Central State Teachers	3	–	2	–	1	5	–	3	–	1
East Central	3	–	2	–	2	4	–	3	–	2
Oklahoma City	2	–	2	–	1	6	–	2	–	1
Southwestern State	2	–	2	–	2	5	–	2	–	2
Northwestern Oklahoma State	1	–	6	–	0	2	–	6	–	0
Southeastern Oklahoma State	0	–	7	–	0	2	–	8	–	0
$ – Conference champion

The 1928 Phillips Haymakers football team was an American football team represented Phillips University as a member of the Oklahoma Intercollegiate Conference during the 1928 college football season. Led by Louis Wilke in his second and final season as head coach, the Haymakers compiled an overall record of 7–1–1 with a mark of 5–1–1 in conference play, winning the OIC title.

== Schedule ==
Date	Time	Opponent	Site	Result	Attendance	Source
September 29	3:00 p.m.	Oklahoma Panhandle*	Enid, OK	W 13–0		
October 6	3:00 p.m.	Northeastern State	Alton Field; Enid, OK	W 7–0		
October 20		at Oklahoma City	Oklahoma City, OK	L 0–14		
October 27	2:45 p.m.	at Tulsa	McNulty Park; Tulsa, OK	W 27–26	3,500	
November 3	2:30 p.m.	Oklahoma Baptist^{†}	Alton Field; Enid, OK	W 7–0		
November 10		at Northwestern Oklahoma State	Alva, OK	W 7–0	2,500	
November 12		Eastern Oklahoma*	Alton Field; Enid, OK	W 31–3		
November 23		at East Central	Ada, OK	W 25–7		
November 29	10:00 a.m.	Central State Teachers	Enid, OK	T 0–0	500	
*Non-conference game; ^{†}Homecoming; All times are in Central time
