= 1928 Kent State Golden Flashes football team =

American college football season

1928 Kent State Golden Flashes football
- Conference: Independent
- Record: 4–2–2
- Head coach: Merle E. Wagoner (4th season)
- Home stadium: Rockwell Field

1928 Midwestern college football independents records
	Conf.			Overall
Team	W	L	T	W		L		T
Detroit		–		9	–	0	–	0
Butler		–		6	–	2	–	0
John Carroll		–		6	–	3	–	0
Kent State		–		4	–	2	–	2
Marquette		–		5	–	3	–	1
Ball Teachers		–		3	–	2	–	2
Notre Dame		–		5	–	4	–	0
DePaul		–		4	–	4	–	1
Haskell		–		5	–	5	–	0
Michigan Tech		–		2	–	2	–	1
Saint Louis		–		4	–	4	–	1
Wabash		–		4	–	4	–	1
Loyola (IL)		–		4	–	4	–	0
Lombard		–		3	–	4	–	1
Michigan State		–		3	–	4	–	1
Detroit City College		–		2	–	5	–	1
Valparaiso		–		1	–	6	–	0

The 1928 Kent State Golden Flashes football team represented Kent State during the 1928 college football season. In its fourth season under head coach Merle E. Wagoner, Kent State compiled a 4–2–2 record and outscored by a total of 89 to 34.

In addition to compiling the program's first winning season, the 1928 team set programs records for points scored in a game (26 against Cedarville) and in a season (89). The team also gained 347 yards against Cedarville, which was 100 more than the team had ever gained in a previous game.

The Chestnut Burr of 1929 noted the remarkable improvement of the 1928 team, building on the prior year's fine defensive work with improved offensive output.

== Schedule ==
Date	Opponent	Site	Result	Source
September 29	at Kenyon	Gambier, OH	W 25–6	
October 6	at John Carroll	Cleveland, OH	L 0–12	
October 13	at Defiance	Defiance, OH	T 0–0	
October 20	at Akron	Buchtel Field; Akron, OH (rivalry)	L 6–8	
October 27	Cedarville	Rockwell Field; Kent, OH	W 26–0	
November 3	Rio Grande	Rockwell Field; Kent, OH	W 13–0	
November 12	Indiana (PA)	Bowers Field; Kent, OH (Armistice Day)	W 13–0	
November 24	at Bowling Green	Bowling Green, OH (rivalry)	T 6–6	

== Roster ==
The roster of the 1928 team included:

- Jack Chernin, center
- Sherman Crow, guard
- Frank Curtiss, end
- Archie Davis, end
- Willard Fisher, end
- Claude Graber, guard
- Clarence Hinkle, guard
- "Cocky" Kilbourne, fullback
- Jimmie Menough, halfback
- Ted Sapp, tackle
- "Jake" Searl, captain
- Ralph Spangler, tackle
- Arthur Stejaskal, halfback
