= Louis Wilke =

American sports coach and athletics administrator

Louis Gustav Wilke (October 10, 1896 – February 28, 1962) was an American football and basketball coach and attention administrator. After coaching basketball on a high school level, he became the coach for Phillips University in 1927. He also coached the Phillips 66ers of the Amateur Athletic Union (AAU) from 1929 to 1931 to a 98–8 record. After his coaching career he was a served chairman of the AAU Basketball Committee for seven terms and was an executive board member of the United States Olympic Committee from 1956 to 1960. He was enshrined in the Naismith Memorial Basketball Hall of Fame as a contributor in 1983.

Wilke was born on October 10, 1896, in Chicago. He graduated from Northwestern Territorial Normal School—now known as Northwestern Oklahoma State University—in 1916 earned a Bachelor of Arts degree from Phillips University in Enid, Oklahoma in 1920. Wilke coached at high school football and basketball in Nowata and Bartlesville, Oklahoma before returning to Phillips as head coach in 1927. He died of a cerebral hemorrhage, on February 28, 1962, at his brother-in-law's home in Northbrook, Illinois.

== Head coaching record ==
=== College football ===
Year	Team	Overall	Conference	Standing
Phillips Haymakers (Oklahoma Intercollegiate Conference) (1927–1928)
1927	Phillips	5–2–1	5–2–1	5th
1928	Phillips	7–1–1	5–1–1	1st
Phillips:		12–3–1	10–3–1	
Total:		12–3–1		
National championship Conference title Conference division title or championship game berth
