= 1928 Notre Dame Fighting Irish football team =

American college football season

1928 Notre Dame Fighting Irish football
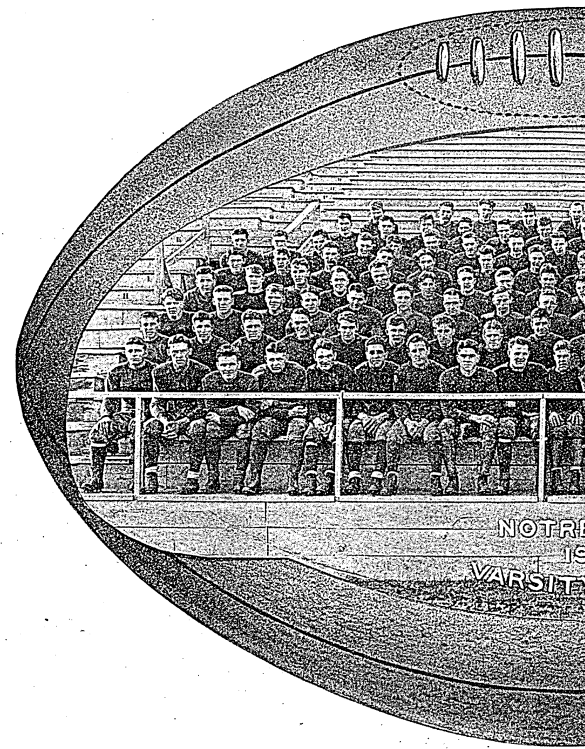
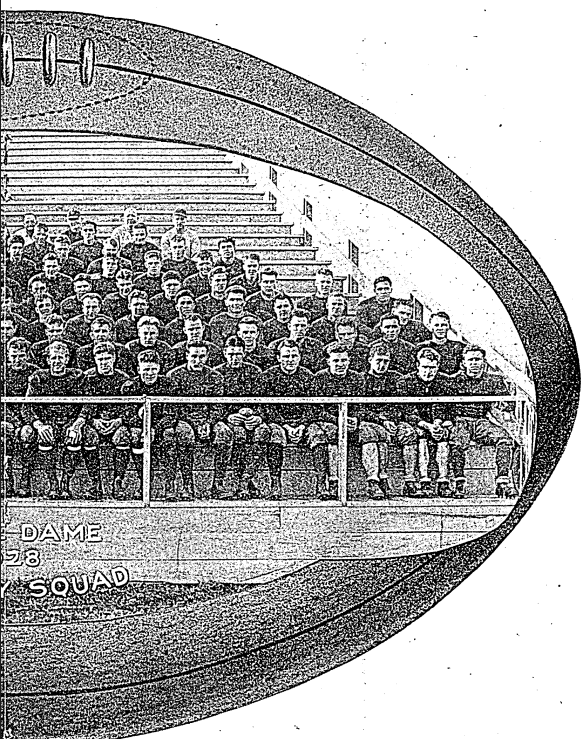
- Portrait of 1928 Notre Dame varsity football squad
- Conference: Independent
- Record: 5–4
- Head coach: Knute Rockne (11th season)
- Offensive scheme: Notre Dame Box
- Base defense: 7–2–2
- Captain: Fred Miller
- Home stadium: Cartier Field

1928 Midwestern college football independents records
	Conf.			Overall
Team	W	L	T	W		L		T
Detroit		–		9	–	0	–	0
Butler		–		6	–	2	–	0
John Carroll		–		6	–	3	–	0
Kent State		–		4	–	2	–	2
Marquette		–		5	–	3	–	1
Ball Teachers		–		3	–	2	–	2
Notre Dame		–		5	–	4	–	0
DePaul		–		4	–	4	–	1
Haskell		–		5	–	5	–	0
Michigan Tech		–		2	–	2	–	1
Saint Louis		–		4	–	4	–	1
Wabash		–		4	–	4	–	1
Loyola (IL)		–		4	–	4	–	0
Lombard		–		3	–	4	–	1
Michigan State		–		3	–	4	–	1
Detroit City College		–		2	–	5	–	1
Valparaiso		–		1	–	6	–	0

The 1928 Notre Dame Fighting Irish football team was an American football team that represented the University of Notre Dame as an independent during the 1928 college football season. In their 11th year head coach Knute Rockne, the Irish compiled a 5–4 record and were outscored by a total of 107 to 99. The defeat of Army was the "Win one for the Gipper" game.

Tackle and team captain Fred Miller received first-team honors from the International News Service on the 1928 All-America college football team. Center Tim Moynihan received third-team honors from the United Press.

The team played its home games at Cartier Field for the final season in 1928. The final game at Cartier Field was a 27–7 upset loss to Carnegie Tech—Notre Dame's first home loss since 1905.

== Schedule ==
Date	Opponent	Site	Result	Attendance	Source
September 29	Loyola - New Orleans	Cartier Field; Notre Dame, IN	W 12–6	13,000–15,000	
October 6	at Wisconsin	Camp Randall Stadium; Madison, WI	L 6–22	29,885	
October 13	vs. Navy	Soldier Field; Chicago, IL (rivalry)	W 7–0	120,000	
October 20	at Georgia Tech	Grant Field; Atlanta, GA (rivalry)	L 0–13	35,000	
October 27	Drake	Cartier Field; Notre Dame, IN	W 32–6	12,000–15,000	
November 3	vs. Penn State	Franklin Field; Philadelphia, PA (rivalry)	W 9–0	30,000	
November 10	vs. Army	Yankee Stadium; Bronx, NY (rivalry)	W 12–6	78,188	
November 17	Carnegie Tech	Cartier Field; Notre Dame, IN	L 7–27	26,000–30,000	
December 1	at USC	Memorial Coliseum; Los Angeles, CA (rivalry)	L 14–27	72,632	

== Personnel ==
=== Players ===
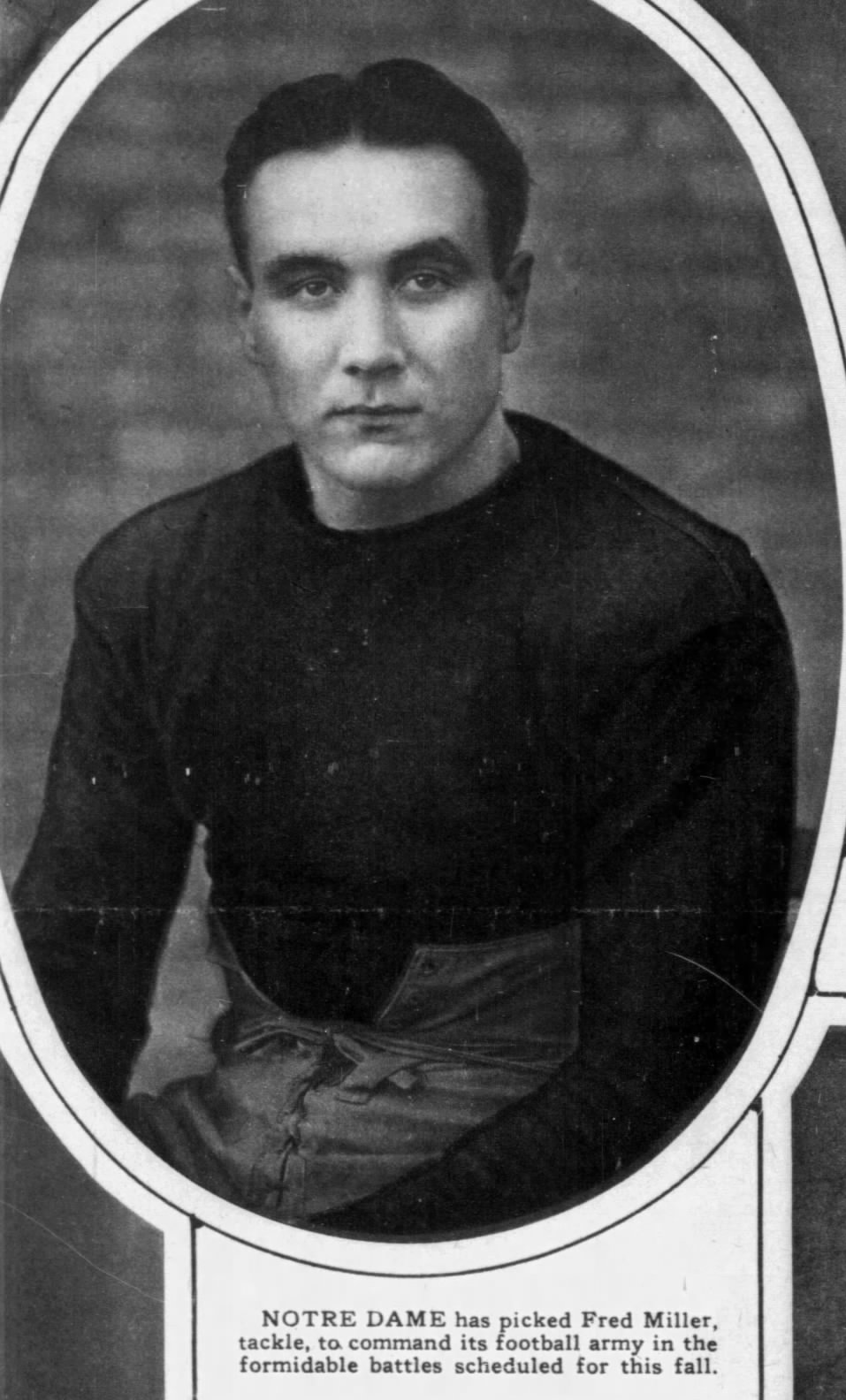
Fred Miller

- Gus Bondi, guard
- Jim Brady, quarterback, Pocatello, Idaho, 5'7", 140 pounds
- Jim Bray, left halfback
- Jack Cannon, guard, Columbus, Ohio, 5'11, 193 pounds
- Frank Carideo, quarterback, 5'7", 172 pounds
- Jack Chevigny, right halfback, Hammond, Indiana, 5'9", 168 pounds
- Ed Collins, left end
- Fred Collins, fullback, Portland, Oregon, 5'8", 170 pounds
- John Colrick, left end, New Jersey, 6', 175 pounds
- Tom Conley, right end, Philadelphia, 5'11", 170 pounds
- Billy Dew, right halfback
- John Doarn, right tackle
- Dick Donoghue, right tackle
- Jack Elder, left halfback
- Al Gebert, quarterback, Jacksonville, Illinois, 5'8", 160 pounds
- Tom Kenneally, quarterback
- John B. Law, left guard, Yonkers, New York, 5'9", 163 pounds
- Bernie Leahy, left halfback, Chicago, 5'11", 178 punds
- Frank Leahy, left tackle, Winner, South Dakota, 5'11", 183 pounds
- George Leppig, right guard, Cleveland, 5'9", 180 pounds
- Jack McGrath, right tackle, Cleveland, 6', 195 pounds
- Bert Metzger, right guard, Chicago, 5'9", 165 pounds
- Fred Miller, left tackle and captain, Milwaukee, 6', 200 pounds
- Jack Montroy, right halfback
- Joe Morrissey, quarterback
- Tim Moynihan, center, Rawlings, Wyoming, 6'1", 195 pounds
- Larry Mullins, fullback, Pasadena, California, 6', 175 pounds
- Tom Murphy, right end
- Joe Nash, center
- John Niemiec, left halfback, St. Edwards, Texas, 5'7-1/2", 170 pounds
- John O'Brien, left end
- Jerry Ransavage, left tackle
- Jack Reilly, right halfback
- Dinny Shay, fullback, Hartford, Connecticut, 5'9", 165 pounds
- Ted Twomey, right tackle, Duluth, Minnesota, 6', 195 pounds
- Manfred Vezie, right end, McDonald, Pennsylvania, 6', 175 pounds
- Tommy Yarr, center, Chinacum, Washington, 5'10", 185 pounds

=== Coaching staff ===
- Head coach: Knute Rockne
- Assistant coaches: Tommy Mills, John P. Smith (line), John "Ike" Voedisch (assistant line), Edward Healy
- Freshman coach: John Polisky
- Trainer: Dr. Clough
- Head cheerleader: Bob Manix
