= 1928 Oklahoma Sooners football team =

American college football season

1928 Oklahoma Sooners football
- Conference: Big Six Conference
- Record: 5–3 (3–2 Big 6)
- Head coach: Adrian Lindsey (2nd season)
- Captain: Bill Hamilton
- Home stadium: Memorial Stadium

1928 Big Six Conference football standings
| | Conf. | | | | | Overall |
| Team | W | | L | | T | W | | L | | T |
|---|---|---|---|---|---|---|---|---|---|---|
| Nebraska $ | 5 | – | 0 | – | 0 | 7 | – | 1 | – | 1 |
| Oklahoma | 3 | – | 2 | – | 0 | 5 | – | 3 | – | 0 |
| Missouri | 3 | – | 2 | – | 0 | 4 | – | 4 | – | 0 |
| Iowa State | 2 | – | 2 | – | 1 | 2 | – | 5 | – | 1 |
| Kansas | 1 | – | 3 | – | 1 | 2 | – | 4 | – | 2 |
| Kansas State | 0 | – | 5 | – | 0 | 3 | – | 5 | – | 0 |
$ – Conference champion

The 1928 Oklahoma Sooners football team represented the University of Oklahoma in the 1928 college football season. In their second year under head coach Adrian Lindsey, the Sooners compiled a 5–3 record (3–2 against conference opponents), finished in third place in the Big Six Conference, and outscored their opponents by a combined total of 120 to 88.

No Sooners received All-America honors in 1928, though end Tom Churchill received all-conference honors.

== Schedule ==
| Date | Opponent | Site | Result |
|---|---|---|---|
| October 6 | at Indiana* | Memorial Stadium; Bloomington, IN | L 7–10 |
| October 13 | Creighton* | Memorial Stadium; Norman, OK | W 7–0 |
| October 27 | Kansas State | Memorial Stadium; Norman, OK | W 33–21 |
| November 3 | at Iowa State | State Field; Ames, IA | L 0–13 |
| November 10 | Nebraska | Memorial Stadium; Norman, OK (rivalry) | L 6–44 |
| November 17 | at Kansas | Memorial Stadium; Lawrence, KS | W 7–0 |
| November 24 | at Oklahoma A&M* | Lewis Field; Stillwater, OK (Bedlam) | W 46–0 |
| November 29 | Missouri | Memorial Stadium; Norman, OK (rivalry) | W 13–0 |
*Non-conference game
