= 1928 DePaul Blue Demons football team =

American college football season

1928 DePaul Blue Demons football
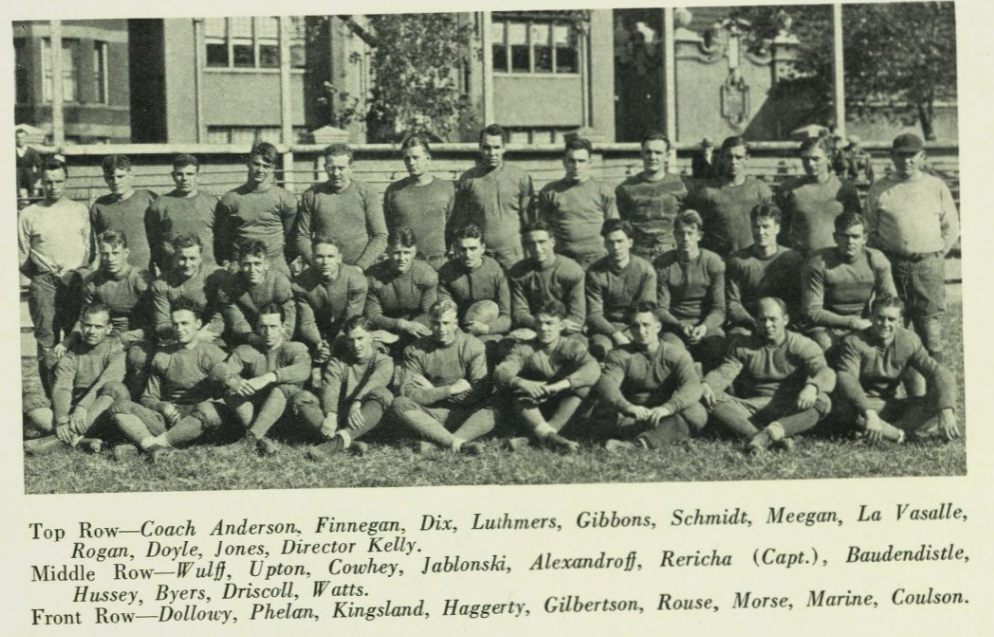
- Conference: Independent
- Record: 4–4–1
- Head coach: Eddie Anderson (4th season)
- Home stadium: DePaul Field, Soldier Field

1928 Midwestern college football independents records
	Conf.			Overall
Team	W	L	T	W		L		T
Detroit		–		9	–	0	–	0
Butler		–		6	–	2	–	0
John Carroll		–		6	–	3	–	0
Kent State		–		4	–	2	–	2
Marquette		–		5	–	3	–	1
Ball Teachers		–		3	–	2	–	2
Notre Dame		–		5	–	4	–	0
DePaul		–		4	–	4	–	1
Haskell		–		5	–	5	–	0
Michigan Tech		–		2	–	2	–	1
Saint Louis		–		4	–	4	–	1
Wabash		–		4	–	4	–	1
Loyola (IL)		–		4	–	4	–	0
Lombard		–		3	–	4	–	1
Michigan State		–		3	–	4	–	1
Detroit City College		–		2	–	5	–	1
Valparaiso		–		1	–	6	–	0

The 1928 DePaul Blue Demons football team was an American football team that represented DePaul University as an independent during the 1928 college football season. In its fourth season under head coach Eddie Anderson, the team compiled a 4–4–1 record and was outscored by a total of 117 to 100.

== Schedule ==
Date	Opponent	Site	Result	Attendance	Source
September 22	Crane College	North Side Field; Chicago, IL	W 27–0		
September 29	at Detroit	University of Detroit Stadium; Detroit, MI	L 0–39		
October 6	Illinois JV	DePaul Field; Chicago, IL	W 20–7		
October 13	at Tulsa	McNulty Park; Tulsa, OK	L 0–27		
October 20	Des Moines	DePaul Field; Chicago, IL	T 0–0		
November 3	at Minnesota B team	Memorial Stadium; Minneapolis, MN	W 27–14	1,500	
November 10	Niagara	Soldier Field; Chicago, IL	W 13–7	44,000	
November 18	at St. Mary's (TX)	League Park; San Antonio, TX	L 13–16	4,000	
December 1	Loyola (IL)	Soldier Field; Chicago, IL	L 0–7		
