= 1928 Iowa State Cyclones football team =

American college football season

1928 Iowa State Cyclones football
- Conference: Big Six Conference
- Record: 2–5–1 (2–2–1 Big 6)
- Head coach: C. Noel Workman (3rd season)
- Captain: Harry Lindblom
- Home stadium: State Field

1928 Big Six Conference football standings
	Conf.					Overall
Team	W		L		T	W		L		T
Nebraska $	5	–	0	–	0	7	–	1	–	1
Oklahoma	3	–	2	–	0	5	–	3	–	0
Missouri	3	–	2	–	0	4	–	4	–	0
Iowa State	2	–	2	–	1	2	–	5	–	1
Kansas	1	–	3	–	1	2	–	4	–	2
Kansas State	0	–	5	–	0	3	–	5	–	0
$ – Conference champion

The 1928 Iowa State Cyclones football team represented Iowa State College of Agricultural and Mechanic Arts (later renamed Iowa State University) in the Big Six Conference during the 1928 college football season. In their third season under head coach C. Noel Workman, the Cyclones compiled a 2–5–1 record (2–2–1 against conference opponents), finished in fourth place in the conference, and were outscored by opponents by a combined total of 67 to 39. They played their home games at State Field in Ames, Iowa.

Harry Lindblom was the team captain. Paul Trauger was selected as a first-team all-conference player.

== Schedule ==
Date	Time	Opponent	Site	Result	Attendance	Source
October 6	2:30 pm	Nebraska	State Field; Ames, IA (rivalry)	L 6–31	5,884	
October 13	2:00 pm	at Grinnell*	Ward Field; Grinnell, IA	L 0–3	2,125–2,500	
October 20	3:00 pm	at Missouri	Memorial Stadium; Columbia, MO (rivalry)	L 19–28	6,002	
October 27	2:00 pm	at Kansas	Memorial Stadium; Lawrence, KS	T 0–0	4,721	
November 3	2:00 pm	Oklahoma^{†}	State Field; Ames, IA	W 13–0	4,875	
November 17	2:00 pm	Kansas State	State Field; Ames, IA (rivalry)	W 7–0	2,163	
November 24	2:00 pm	at Drake*	Drake Stadium; Des Moines, IA	L 0–18	10,294	
November 29	2:00 pm	at Marquette*	Marquette Stadium; Milwaukee, WI	L 0–6	15,000	
*Non-conference game; ^{†}Homecoming; All times are in Central time
