= 1928 Washington University Bears football team =

American college football season

1928 Washington University Bears football
- Conference: Missouri Valley Conference
- Record: 2–5–1 (0–2 MVC)
- Head coach: Albert Sharpe (1st season)
- Home stadium: Francis Field

1928 Missouri Valley Conference football standings
	Conf.					Overall
Team	W		L		T	W		L		T
Drake $	3	–	0	–	0	7	–	1	–	0
Creighton	2	–	1	–	0	3	–	5	–	1
Grinnell	1	–	2	–	0	4	–	3	–	1
Oklahoma A&M	0	–	1	–	0	1	–	7	–	0
Washington University	0	–	2	–	0	2	–	5	–	1
$ – Conference champion

The 1928 Washington University Bears football team represented Washington University in St. Louis as a member of the Missouri Valley Conference (MVC) during the 1928 college football season. Led by first-year head coach Albert Sharpe, the Bears compiled an overall record of 2–5–1 with a mark of 0–2 in conference play, placing last out of five teams in the MVC. Washington University played home games at Francis Field in St. Louis.

== Schedule ==
Date	Time	Opponent	Site	Result	Attendance	Source
September 29	2:30 p.m.	at Westminster (MO)*	Francis Field; St. Louis, MO	L 0–6	4,500	
October 6		Missouri Mines*	Francis Field; St. Louis, MO	W 9–0	2,500–4,000	
October 13		Kansas*	Francis Field; St. Louis, MO	T 7–7	10,000	
October 27	1:30 p.m.	at Butler*	Butler Bowl; Indianapolis, IN	L 7–13		
November 3	2:00 p.m.	Haskell*	Francis Field; St. Louis, MO	L 0–7	4,000	
November 10	2:00 p.m.	at Drake	Drake Stadium; Des Moines, IA	L 0–20		
November 17	2:00 p.m.	Grinnell	Francis Field; St. Louis, MO	L 6–7	6,500	
November 29	2:00 p.m.	at Saint Louis*	Sportsman's Park; St. Louis, MO	W 6–0	12,980	
*Non-conference game; All times are in Central time
