= 1928 Tulsa Golden Hurricane football team =

American college football season

1928 Tulsa Golden Hurricane football
- Conference: Oklahoma Intercollegiate Conference
- Record: 7–2–1 (3–1–1 OIC)
- Head coach: Gus Henderson (4th season)
- Home stadium: McNulty Park

1928 Oklahoma Intercollegiate Conference football standings
	Conf.					Overall
Team	W		L		T	W		L		T
Phillips $	5	–	1	–	1	7	–	1	–	1
Oklahoma Baptist	4	–	1	–	2	5	–	2	–	2
Tulsa	3	–	1	–	1	7	–	2	–	1
Northeastern State	2	–	1	–	2	4	–	1	–	2
Central State Teachers	3	–	2	–	1	5	–	3	–	1
East Central	3	–	2	–	2	4	–	3	–	2
Oklahoma City	2	–	2	–	1	6	–	2	–	1
Southwestern State	2	–	2	–	2	5	–	2	–	2
Northwestern Oklahoma State	1	–	6	–	0	2	–	6	–	0
Southeastern Oklahoma State	0	–	7	–	0	2	–	8	–	0
$ – Conference champion

The 1928 Tulsa Golden Hurricane football team represented the University of Tulsa during the 1928 college football season. In their fourth year under head coach Gus Henderson, the Golden Hurricane compiled a 7–2–1 record and outscored their opponents by a total of 267 cto 80.

== Schedule ==
Date	Time	Opponent	Site	Result	Attendance	Source
September 29		Northwestern Oklahoma State	McNulty Park; Tulsa, OK	W 19–0		
October 6		Detroit*	McNulty Park; Tulsa, OK	L 14–19		
October 13		DePaul*	McNulty Park; Tulsa, OK	W 27–0		
October 20	3:00 p.m.	Wichita*^{†}	McNulty Park; Tulsa, OK	W 46–0		
October 27	2:45 p.m.	Phillips	McNulty Park; Tulsa, OK	L 26–27	3,500	
November 10		Oklahoma City	McNulty Park; Tulsa, OK	W 13–8		
November 17		at Oklahoma Baptist	Shawnee, OK	T 13–13		
November 24		Southeastern Oklahoma State	McNulty Park; Tulsa, OK	W 51–0		
November 29	2:00 p.m.	Oklahoma A&M*	McNulty Park; Tulsa, OK (rivalry)	W 31–0		
December 8		Haskell*	McNulty Park; Tulsa, OK	W 27–6	4,500	
*Non-conference game; ^{†}Homecoming; All times are in Central time
