= 1928 Kansas Jayhawks football team =

American college football season

1928 Kansas Jayhawks football
- Conference: Big Six Conference
- Record: 2–4–2 (1–3–1 Big 6)
- Head coach: Bill Hargiss (1st season)
- Captain: Harold Hauser
- Home stadium: Memorial Stadium

1928 Big Six Conference football standings
	Conf.					Overall
Team	W		L		T	W		L		T
Nebraska $	5	–	0	–	0	7	–	1	–	1
Oklahoma	3	–	2	–	0	5	–	3	–	0
Missouri	3	–	2	–	0	4	–	4	–	0
Iowa State	2	–	2	–	1	2	–	5	–	1
Kansas	1	–	3	–	1	2	–	4	–	2
Kansas State	0	–	5	–	0	3	–	5	–	0
$ – Conference champion

The 1928 Kansas Jayhawks football team represented the University of Kansas in the Big Six Conference during the 1928 college football season. In their first season under head coach Bill Hargiss, the Jayhawks compiled a 4–4 record (2–3 against conference opponents), finished in fifth place in the conference, and were outscored by opponents by a combined total of 66 to 34. They played their home games at Memorial Stadium in Lawrence, Kansas. Harold Hauser was the team captain.

== Schedule ==
Date	Opponent	Site	Result	Attendance	Source
October 6	Grinnell*	Memorial Stadium; Lawrence, KS	W 14–0		
October 13	at Washington University*	Francis Field; St. Louis, MO	T 7–7	10,000	
October 20	at Kansas State	Memorial Stadium; Manhattan, KS (rivalry)	W 7–0		
October 27	Iowa State	Memorial Stadium; Lawrence, KS	T 0–0		
November 3	Nebraska^{†}	Memorial Stadium; Lawrence, KS (rivalry)	L 0–20		
November 10	at Marquette*	Marquette Stadium; Milwaukee, WI	L 0–7		
November 17	Oklahoma	Memorial Stadium; Lawrence, KS	L 0–7		
November 24	at Missouri	Memorial Stadium; Columbia, MO (rivalry)	L 6–25		
*Non-conference game; ^{†}Homecoming
