= 1928 Albion Methodists football team =

American college football season

1928 Albion Methodists football
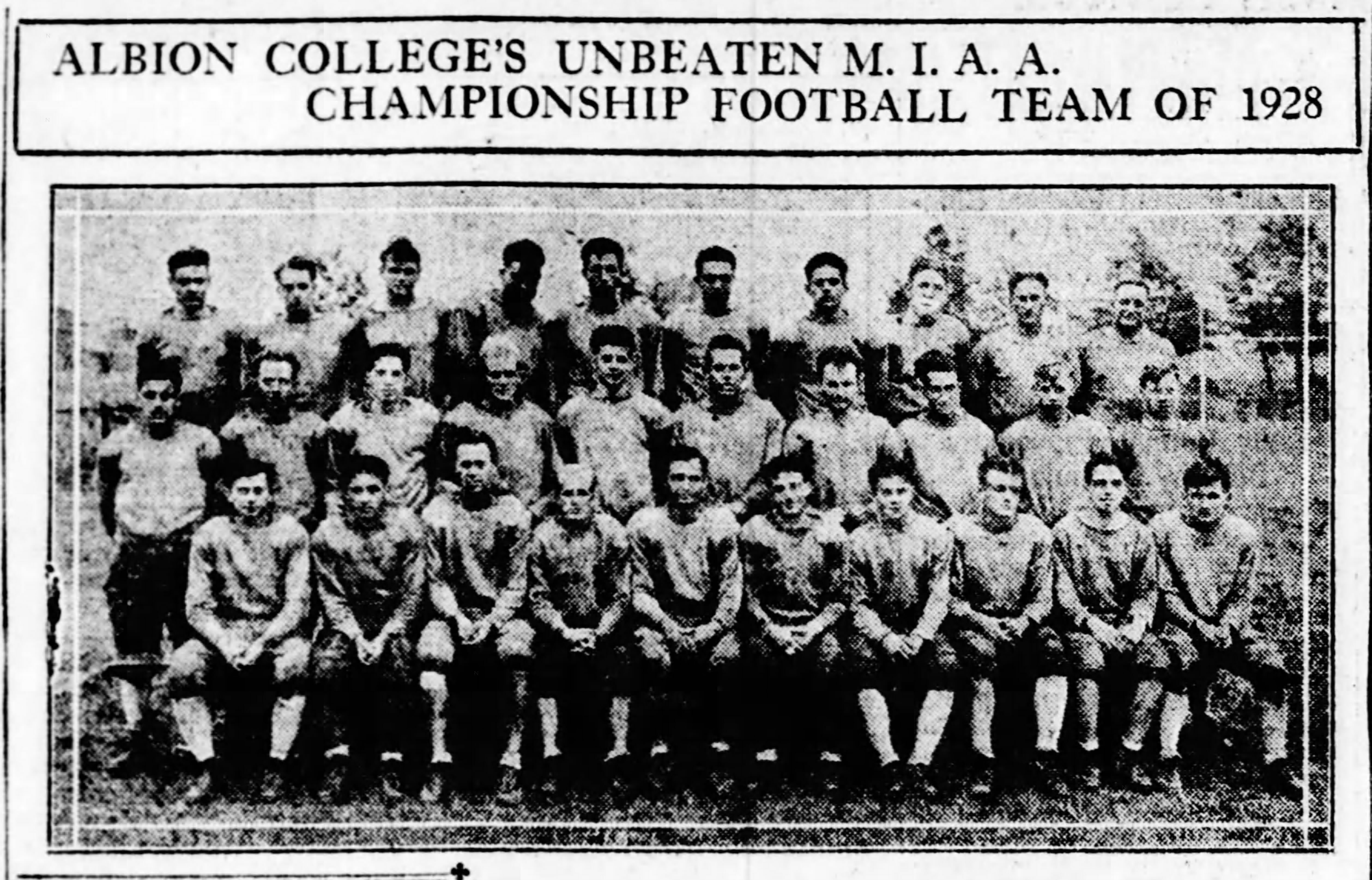

MIAA champion
- Conference: Michigan Intercollegiate Athletic Association
- Record: 8–0 (5–0 MIAA)
- Head coach: Bud Daugherty (2nd season)
- Home stadium: Alumni Field

1928 Michigan Intercollegiate Athletic Association football standings
	Conf.					Overall
Team	W		L		T	W		L		T
Albion $	5	–	0	–	0	8	–	0	–	0
Kalamazoo	3	–	1	–	1	3	–	3	–	2
Alma	3	–	2	–	0	3	–	4	–	0
Hillsdale	0	–	2	–	3	1	–	3	–	3
Hope	0	–	3	–	2	1	–	3	–	2
Olivet	0	–	3	–	2	1	–	4	–	3
$ – Conference champion

The 1928 Albion Methodists football team, sometimes referenced as the Albion Purple and Gold, was an American football team that represented Albion College as a member of the Michigan Intercollegiate Athletic Association (MIAA) during the 1928 college football season. In their second season under head coach Bud Daugherty, the Britons compiled a perfect 8–0 record (5–0 against MIAA members), won the MIAA championship, shut out six of eight opponents, and outscored all opponents by a total of 121 to 13. It was the first perfect season for Albion's football program since going 4–0 in 1891. The season included a 2–0 upset victory over Harry Kipke's Michigan State Spartans.

Daugherty joined the Albion faculty in 1927 with duties as athletic director and coach. In 1928, he led Albion to MIAA championships in baseball, track, and football. The football team reportedly lacked outstanding stars but won a reputation as "a well-conditioned and well developed team" and one where each man "was working for the team, not himself." Team leaders included co-captain and end "Smiling" Mike Palermo and halfback Bill Lightbody.

The team played its home games at Alumni Field in Albion, Michigan.

== Schedule ==
Date	Opponent	Site	Result	Attendance	Source
September 29	Valparaiso*	Alumni Field; Albion, MI	W 12–0		
October 6	at Michigan State*	College Field; East Lansing, MI	W 2–0	6,000–7,000	
October 13	Detroit Tech*	Alumni Field; Albion, MI	W 25–0		
October 20	Olivet^{†}	Alumni Field; Albion, MI	W 26–7	5,000	
October 27	Kalamazoo	Alumni Field; Albion, MI	W 14–0		
November 3	at Alma	Alma, MI	W 9–6		
November 10	at Hillsdale	Hillsdale, MI	W 26–0		
November 16	Hope	Alumni Field; Albion, MI	W 7–0		
*Non-conference game; ^{†}Homecoming
