= 1928 Oklahoma A&M Cowboys football team =

American college football season

1928 Oklahoma A&M Cowboys football
- Conference: Missouri Valley Conference
- Record: 1–7 (0–1 MVC)
- Head coach: John Maulbetsch (8th season)
- Home stadium: Lewis Field

1928 Missouri Valley Conference football standings
	Conf.					Overall
Team	W		L		T	W		L		T
Drake $	3	–	0	–	0	7	–	1	–	0
Creighton	2	–	1	–	0	3	–	5	–	1
Grinnell	1	–	2	–	0	4	–	3	–	1
Oklahoma A&M	0	–	1	–	0	1	–	7	–	0
Washington University	0	–	2	–	0	2	–	5	–	1
$ – Conference champion

The 1928 Oklahoma A&M Cowboys football team represented Oklahoma A&M College in the 1928 college football season. This was the 28th year of football at A&M and the eighth under John Maulbetsch. The Cowboys played their home games at Lewis Field in Stillwater, Oklahoma. They finished the season 1–7–0, 0–1–0 in the Missouri Valley Conference.

== Schedule ==
Date	Time	Opponent	Site	Result	Attendance	Source
September 29		Regis*	Lewis Field; Stillwater, OK	W 13–6		
October 6		Kansas State*	Lewis Field; Stillwater, OK	L 6–13		
October 13		at Creighton	Creighton Stadium; Omaha, NE	L 0–37		
October 20		at Marquette*	Valley Fields; Milwaukee, WI	L 0–26	7,000	
November 3		Oklahoma City*	Lewis Field; Stillwater, OK	L 0–9		
November 10		at West Virginia*	Mountaineer Field; Morgantown, WV	L 6–32	12,500	
November 24		Oklahoma*^{†}	Lewis Field; Stillwater, OK (Bedlam)	L 0–46		
November 29	2:00 p.m.	at Tulsa*	McNulty Park; Tulsa, OK (rivalry)	L 0–31		
*Non-conference game; ^{†}Homecoming; All times are in Central time
