= 1928 Missouri Tigers football team =

American college football season

1928 Missouri Tigers football
- Conference: Big Six Conference
- Record: 4–4 (3–2 Big 6)
- Head coach: Gwinn Henry (6th season)
- Captain: Miller Brown
- Home stadium: Memorial Stadium

1928 Big Six Conference football standings
	Conf.					Overall
Team	W		L		T	W		L		T
Nebraska $	5	–	0	–	0	7	–	1	–	1
Oklahoma	3	–	2	–	0	5	–	3	–	0
Missouri	3	–	2	–	0	4	–	4	–	0
Iowa State	2	–	2	–	1	2	–	5	–	1
Kansas	1	–	3	–	1	2	–	4	–	2
Kansas State	0	–	5	–	0	3	–	5	–	0
$ – Conference champion

The 1928 Missouri Tigers football team was an American football team that represented the University of Missouri in the Big Six Conference (Big 6) during the 1928 college football season. The team compiled a 4–4 record (3–2 against Big 6 opponents), finished in a tie for second place in the Big 6, and outscored all opponents by a combined total of 138 to 102. Gwinn Henry was the head coach for the fifth of nine seasons. The team played its home games at Memorial Stadium in Columbia, Missouri.

The team's leading scorer was Robert Mehrle with 32 points.

== Schedule ==
Date	Time	Opponent	Site	Result	Attendance	Source
October 13	2:00 p.m.	Centre*	Memorial Stadium; Columbia, MO	W 60–0	8,500	
October 20		Iowa State	Memorial Stadium; Columbia, MO (rivalry)	W 28–19	6,002	
October 27		at Nebraska	Memorial Stadium; Lincoln, NE (rivalry)	L 0–24	38,000	
November 3		Drake*	Memorial Stadium; Columbia, MO	L 0–6		
November 10		at Kansas State	Memorial Stadium; Manhattan, KS	W 19–6		
November 17		at NYU*	Yankee Stadium; Bronx, NY	L 6–27		
November 24		Kansas	Memorial Stadium; Columbia, MO (rivalry)	W 25–6		
November 29		at Oklahoma	Memorial Stadium; Norman, OK (rivalry)	L 0–14		
*Non-conference game; All times are in Central time
