= 1928 Marquette Golden Avalanche football team =

American college football season

1928 Marquette Golden Avalanche football
- Conference: Independent
- Record: 5–3–1
- Head coach: Frank Murray (7th season)
- Home stadium: Marquette Stadium

1928 Midwestern college football independents records
| | Conf. | | | Overall |
| Team | W | L | T | W | | L | | T |
|---|---|---|---|---|---|---|---|---|
| Detroit | | – | | 9 | – | 0 | – | 0 |
| Butler | | – | | 6 | – | 2 | – | 0 |
| John Carroll | | – | | 6 | – | 3 | – | 0 |
| Kent State | | – | | 4 | – | 2 | – | 2 |
| Marquette | | – | | 5 | – | 3 | – | 1 |
| Ball Teachers | | – | | 3 | – | 2 | – | 2 |
| Notre Dame | | – | | 5 | – | 4 | – | 0 |
| DePaul | | – | | 4 | – | 4 | – | 1 |
| Haskell | | – | | 5 | – | 5 | – | 0 |
| Michigan Tech | | – | | 2 | – | 2 | – | 1 |
| Saint Louis | | – | | 4 | – | 4 | – | 1 |
| Wabash | | – | | 4 | – | 4 | – | 1 |
| Loyola (IL) | | – | | 4 | – | 4 | – | 0 |
| Lombard | | – | | 3 | – | 4 | – | 1 |
| Michigan State | | – | | 3 | – | 4 | – | 1 |
| Detroit City College | | – | | 2 | – | 5 | – | 1 |
| Valparaiso | | – | | 1 | – | 6 | – | 0 |

The 1928 Marquette Golden Avalanche football team was an American football team that represented Marquette University as an independent during the 1928 college football season. In its seventh season under head coach Frank Murray, the team compiled a 5–3–1 record and outscored all opponents by a total of 121 to 68. The team played its home games at Marquette Stadium in Milwaukee.

Frank Murray was Marquette's head football coach for 19 years and was posthumously inducted into the College Football Hall of Fame in 1983.

== Schedule ==
| Date | Opponent | Site | Result | Attendance | Source |
|---|---|---|---|---|---|
| September 29 | St. Viator | Marquette Stadium; Milwaukee, WI | W 31–0 | | |
| October 6 | at Lawrence | Appleton, WI | W 19–7 | 5,000 | |
| October 13 | Drake | Marquette Stadium; Milwaukee, WI | L 7–26 | 6,000 | |
| October 20 | Oklahoma A&M | Marquette Stadium; Milwaukee, WI | W 26–0 | 7,000 | |
| October 27 | at Holy Cross | Fitton Field; Worcester, MA | T 6–6 | 10,000 | |
| November 3 | at Grinnell | Grinnell, IA | L 13–20 | | |
| November 10 | Kansas | Marquette Stadium; Milwaukee, WI | W 7–0 | | |
| November 29 | Iowa State | Marquette Stadium; Milwaukee, WI | W 6–0 | 15,000 | |
| December 8 | Creighton | Marquette Stadium; Milwaukee, WI | L 6–9 | 5,000 | |
