= 1928 Akron Zippers football team =

American college football season

1928 Akron Zippers football
- Conference: Ohio Athletic Conference
- Record: 5–4 (3–4 OAC)
- Head coach: Red Blair (2nd season)
- Captain: John Mahoney
- Home stadium: Buchtel Field

1928 Ohio Athletic Conference football standings
	Conf.					Overall
Team	W		L		T	W		L		T
Heidelberg $	6	–	0	–	1	6	–	0	–	1
Mount Union	4	–	2	–	0	4	–	5	–	0
Muskingum	4	–	2	–	1	4	–	4	–	1
Oberlin	3	–	2	–	1	4	–	3	–	1
Wooster	2	–	2	–	2	2	–	4	–	2
Akron	3	–	4	–	0	5	–	4	–	0
Hiram	3	–	4	–	0	4	–	4	–	0
Otterbein	3	–	4	–	0	3	–	5	–	0
Ohio Northern	2	–	3	–	0	2	–	6	–	1
Case	1	–	4	–	1	2	–	6	–	1
Capital	1	–	5	–	0	1	–	6	–	1
St. Xavier	0	–	1	–	0	7	–	2	–	0
Baldwin–Wallace	0	–	8	–	0	0	–	8	–	0
Kenyon	0	–	5	–	0	0	–	7	–	0
Western Reserve *	8	–	0	–	0	8	–	0	–	0
Marietta *	4	–	0	–	0	4	–	2	–	1
Dayton *	2	–	0	–	0	6	–	3	–	0
$ – Conference champion; * – did not compete for championship

The 1928 Akron Zippers football team was an American football team that represented the University of Akron in the Ohio Athletic Conference (OAC) during the 1928 college football season. In its second season under head coach Red Blair, the team compiled a 5–4 record (3–4 against conference opponents) and outscored all opponents by a total of 158 to 94. John Mahoney was the team captain.

== Schedule ==
Date	Opponent	Site	Result	Source
October 6	Oberlin	Buchtel Field; Akron, OH	L 7–13	
October 13	at Hiram*	Hiram, OH	W 58–0	
October 20	Kent State*	Buchtel Field; Akron, OH (rivalry)	W 8–6	
October 27	Muskingum	Buchtel Field; Akron, OH	L 0–12	
November 3	at Western Reserve	Van Horn Field; Cleveland, OH	L 7–36	
November 10	Baldwin–Wallace	Buchtel Field; Akron, OH	W 52–6	
	Ohio State reserves*	Buchtel Field; Akron, OH	W 13–0	
November 17	at Wooster	Wooster, OH	L 7–21	
November 24	at Mount Union	Buchtel Field; Akron, OH	W 6–0	
*Non-conference game
