= 1928 Drake Bulldogs football team =

American college football season

1928 Drake Bulldogs football

MVC champion
- Conference: Missouri Valley Conference
- Record: 7–1 (3–0 MVC)
- Head coach: Ossie Solem (8th season)
- Home stadium: Drake Stadium

1928 Missouri Valley Conference football standings
	Conf.					Overall
Team	W		L		T	W		L		T
Drake $	3	–	0	–	0	7	–	1	–	0
Creighton	2	–	1	–	0	3	–	5	–	1
Grinnell	1	–	2	–	0	4	–	3	–	1
Oklahoma A&M	0	–	1	–	0	1	–	7	–	0
Washington University	0	–	2	–	0	2	–	5	–	1
$ – Conference champion

The 1928 Drake Bulldogs football team represented Drake University in the Missouri Valley Conference (MVC) during the 1928 college football season. In its eighth season under head coach Ossie Solem, the team compiled a 7–1 record (3–0 against MVC opponents), won the MVC championship, and outscored all opponents by a total of 141 to 52. The team's only loss was against Knute Rockne's Notre Dame Fighting Irish.

Key players included halfback Dick Nesbitt and guard Lester Jones.

== Schedule ==
Date	Time	Opponent	Site	Result	Attendance	Source
October 6		Simpson*	Drake Stadium; Des Moines, IA	W 40–6	8,000	
October 13		at Marquette*	Marquette Stadium; Milwaukee, WI	W 26–7	6,000	
October 20		Grinnell	Drake Stadium; Des Moines, IA	W 19–7	10,000	
October 27		at Notre Dame*	Cartier Field; Notre Dame, IN	L 6–32	15,000	
November 3		at Missouri*	Memorial Stadium; Columbia, MO	W 6–0		
November 10	2:00 p.m.	Washington University	Drake Stadium; Des Moines, IA	W 20–0		
November 24		Iowa State*	Drake Stadium; Des Moines, IA	W 18–0		
November 29		at Creighton	Creighton Stadium; Omaha, NE	W 6–0		
*Non-conference game; All times are in Central time
