= 1928 Saint Louis Billikens football team =

American college football season

1928 Saint Louis Billikens football
- Conference: Independent
- Record: 4–4–1
- Head coach: Hunk Anderson (1st season)
- Captain: Sylvester Dirnberger
- Home stadium: Public Schools Stadium, Sportsman's Park

1928 Midwestern college football independents records
| | Conf. | | | Overall |
| Team | W | L | T | W | | L | | T |
|---|---|---|---|---|---|---|---|---|
| Detroit | | – | | 9 | – | 0 | – | 0 |
| Butler | | – | | 6 | – | 2 | – | 0 |
| John Carroll | | – | | 6 | – | 3 | – | 0 |
| Kent State | | – | | 4 | – | 2 | – | 2 |
| Marquette | | – | | 5 | – | 3 | – | 1 |
| Ball Teachers | | – | | 3 | – | 2 | – | 2 |
| Notre Dame | | – | | 5 | – | 4 | – | 0 |
| DePaul | | – | | 4 | – | 4 | – | 1 |
| Haskell | | – | | 5 | – | 5 | – | 0 |
| Michigan Tech | | – | | 2 | – | 2 | – | 1 |
| Saint Louis | | – | | 4 | – | 4 | – | 1 |
| Wabash | | – | | 4 | – | 4 | – | 1 |
| Loyola (IL) | | – | | 4 | – | 4 | – | 0 |
| Lombard | | – | | 3 | – | 4 | – | 1 |
| Michigan State | | – | | 3 | – | 4 | – | 1 |
| Detroit City College | | – | | 2 | – | 5 | – | 1 |
| Valparaiso | | – | | 1 | – | 6 | – | 0 |

The 1928 Saint Louis Billikens football team was an American football team that represented Saint Louis University as an independent during the 1928 college football season. In their first season under head coach Hunk Anderson, the Billikens compiled a 4–4–1 record and were outscored by a total of 77 to 52. The team played its home games at Public Schools Stadium and Sportsman's Park in St. Louis.

== Schedule ==
| Date | Time | Opponent | Site | Result | Attendance | Source |
|---|---|---|---|---|---|---|
| September 29 | 2:30 p.m. | McKendree | Public Schools Stadium; St. Louis, MO | W 6–0 | | |
| October 6 | | Southwest Missouri State | Public Schools Stadium; St. Louis, MO | L 0–7 | | |
| October 13 | | Peru State Teachers | Public Schools Stadium; St. Louis, MO | T 6–6 | | |
| October 20 | | Missouri Mines | Sportsman's Park; St. Louis, MO | W 12–7 | 4,500 | |
| October 27 | | Creighton | Sportsman's Park; St. Louis, MO | W 16–6 | | |
| November 3 | | at Detroit | Dinan Field; Detroit, MI | L 0–38 | | |
| November 10 | | Loyola (IL) | Sportsman's Park; St. Louis, MO | L 0–7 | | |
| November 17 | | Louisville | Sportsman's Park; St. Louis, MO | W 12–0 | | |
| November 29 | 2:00 p.m. | Washington University | Sportsman's Park; St. Louis, MO | L 0–6 | 12,980 | |
All times are in Central time
