= 1928 Wichita Shockers football team =

American college football season

1928 Wichita Shockers football
- Conference: Central Intercollegiate Conference
- Record: 3–5 (2–4 CIC)
- Head coach: Sam H. Hill (3rd season)
- Home stadium: Island Park

1928 Central Intercollegiate Conference football standings
	Conf.					Overall
Team	W		L		T	W		L		T
College of Emporia $	6	–	0	–	0	8	–	0	–	0
Emporia Teachers	4	–	1	–	1	6	–	1	–	1
Southwestern (KS)	3	–	1	–	2	4	–	3	–	2
Hays Teachers	3	–	2	–	1	3	–	3	–	2
Wichita	2	–	4	–	0	3	–	5	–	0
Washburn	1	–	5	–	0	2	–	7	–	0
Pittsburg State	0	–	6	–	0	0	–	7	–	0
$ – Conference champion

The 1928 Wichita Shockers football team represented the Municipal University of Wichita—now known as Wichita State University—as a member of the Central Intercollegiate Conference (CIC) during the 1928 college football season. Led by third-year head coach Sam H. Hill, who returned after having helmed the team in 1923 and 1924, the Shockers compiled an overall record of 3–5 record with a mark of 2–4 in conference play, placing fifth in the CIC.

== Schedule ==
Date	Time	Opponent	Site	Result	Source
October 6		at Pittsburg State	Pittsburg, KS	W 9–7	
October 13		at Emporia Teachers	Emporia, KS	L 0–32	
October 20	3:00 p.m.	at Tulsa*	McNulty Park; Tulsa, OK	L 0–46	
October 27	2:30 p.m.	Washburn	Island Park; Wichita, KS	W 27–0	
November 3		at Hays Teachers	Hays, KS	L 0–7	
November 10	2:30 p.m.	Southwestern (KS)	Island Park; Wichita, KS	L 0–7	
November 17		College of Emporia	Island Park; Wichita, KS	L 0–27	
November 29	2:30 p.m.	Friends*	Island Park; Wichita, KS	W 14–0	
*Non-conference game; All times are in Central time
