= 1928 Ball Teachers Hoosieroons football team =

American college football season

1928 Ball Teachers Hoosieroons football
- Conference: Independent
- Record: 3–2–2
- Head coach: Paul B. Parker (1st season)
- Home stadium: Normal Field

1928 Midwestern college football independents records
	Conf.			Overall
Team	W	L	T	W		L		T
Detroit		–		9	–	0	–	0
Butler		–		6	–	2	–	0
John Carroll		–		6	–	3	–	0
Kent State		–		4	–	2	–	2
Marquette		–		5	–	3	–	1
Ball Teachers		–		3	–	2	–	2
Notre Dame		–		5	–	4	–	0
DePaul		–		4	–	4	–	1
Haskell		–		5	–	5	–	0
Michigan Tech		–		2	–	2	–	1
Saint Louis		–		4	–	4	–	1
Wabash		–		4	–	4	–	1
Loyola (IL)		–		4	–	4	–	0
Lombard		–		3	–	4	–	1
Michigan State		–		3	–	4	–	1
Detroit City College		–		2	–	5	–	1
Valparaiso		–		1	–	6	–	0

The 1928 Ball Teachers Hoosieroons football team was an American football team that represented Ball Teachers College (later renamed Ball State University) during the 1928 college football season. The team played its home games at Normal Field in Muncie, Indiana.

== Schedule ==
Date	Opponent	Site	Result
September 29	Concordia (IN)	Normal Field; Muncie, IN	W 52–0
October 6	at Franklin (IN)	Franklin, IN	T 6–6
October 13	Indiana Central	Normal Field; Muncie, IN	T 6–6
October 27	Central Normal	Normal Field; Muncie, IN	W 12–7
November 3	at Butler	Indianapolis, IN	L 6–12
November 10	Hanover	Normal Field; Muncie, IN	W 6–0
November 17	at DePauw	Greencastle, IN	L 0–19
