= Bud Daugherty =

American football coach and administrator (1890–1937)

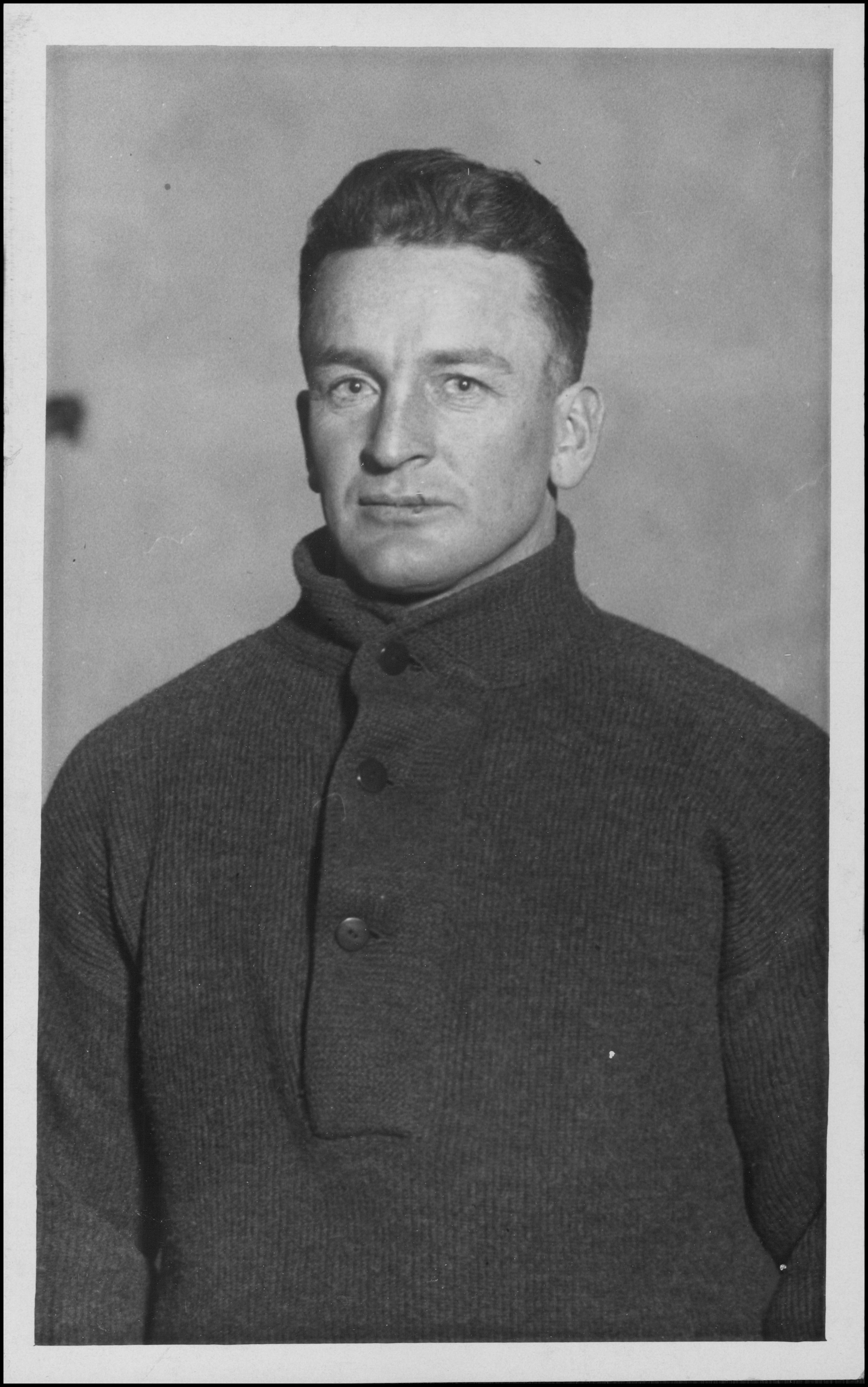

Biographical details
- Born: April 15, 1890; Wayzata, Minnesota, U.S.
- Died: September 12, 1937 (aged 47); Los Angeles, California, U.S.
- Education: University of St. Thomas (1913)

Playing career

Football
- 1912–1914: St. Thomas (MN)
- Position: Halfback

Coaching career (HC unless noted)

Football
- 1916–1917: Jamestown
- 1919–1926: Dakota Wesleyan
- 1927–1935: Albion

Basketball
- 1918–1927: Dakota Wesleyan
- 1927–1936: Albion

Baseball
- 1919: Dakota Wesleyan

Administrative career (AD unless noted)
- 1927–1936: Albion

Head coaching record
- Overall: 80–50–8 (football); 149–114 (basketball)

Accomplishments and honors

Championships
- Football; 5 SDIC (1919, 1921–1923, 1923); 1 MIAA (1928) Basketball; 2 SDIC (1919–1920); 2 MIAA (1929, 1936)

Richard R. "Bud" Daugherty (April 15, 1890 – September 12, 1937) was an American football, basketball, baseball, and track and field coach and college athletics administrator. He served as the head football coach at Jamestown College—now known as the University of Jamestown—in Jamestown, North Dakota from 1916 to 1917, Dakota Wesleyan University in Mitchell, South Dakota from 1919 to 1926, and Albion College in Albion, Michigan from 1927 to 1935, compiling a career college football coaching record of 80–50–8. Daugherty was also the head basketball coach at Dakota Wesleyan from 1918 to 1927 and Albion from 1927 to 1937, tallying a career college basketball coaching mark of 149–114.

In 1928, Daugherty led the Albion football team to a Michigan Intercollegiate Athletic Association (MIAA) championship with an undefeated 8–0 record. The team went 0–6–2 in 1935. In January 1936, Daugherty announced his resignation as the school's football coach following criticism from alumni over the team's lack of success. Daugherty was also Albion's athletic director and coached the baseball, basketball, and track teams. His Albion teams won one MIAA championship in baseball and four in track.

Daugherty was in born in Wayzata, Minnesota and played college football from 1912 to 1914 as a halfback at the College of St. Thomas—now known as the University of St. Thomas—in Minnesota.

Daugherty later became the business manager for movie star Mae West. He died in 1937 at his home in Los Angeles.

== Head coaching record ==
=== Football ===
Year	Team	Overall	Conference	Standing	Bowl/playoffs
Jamestown Jimmies (Independent) (1916–1917)
1916	Jamestown	6–0			
1917	Jamestown	3–1			
Jamestown:		9–1			
Dakota Wesleyan Tigers (South Dakota Intercollegiate Conference) (1919–1926)
1919	Dakota Wesleyan	6–2		1st	
1920	Dakota Wesleyan	4–3	3–1	2nd	
1921	Dakota Wesleyan	6–2	3–0	1st	
1922	Dakota Wesleyan	5–2	4–0	1st	
1923	Dakota Wesleyan	4–2–1	4–0–1	T–1st	
1924	Dakota Wesleyan	4–4	3–1	5th	
1925	Dakota Wesleyan	3–4–1	1–2–1	8th	
1926	Dakota Wesleyan	6–1	5–0	1st	
Dakota Wesleyan:		38–20–2			
Albion Methodists/Britons (Michigan Intercollegiate Athletic Association) (1927–1935)
1927	Albion	5–3	4–1	2nd	
1928	Albion	8–0	5–0	1st	
1929	Albion	5–3	4–1	2nd	
1930	Albion	4–4	3–2	T–3rd	
1931	Albion	3–4	1–3	T–5th	
1932	Albion	4–2–1	2–1–1	2nd	
1933	Albion	1–3–2	0–2–2	T–4th	
1934	Albion	3–4–1	1–2–1	T–4th	
1935	Albion	0–6–2	0–3–1	5th	
Albion:		33–29–6	20–15–5		
Total:		80–50–8			
National championship Conference title Conference division title or championship game berth
