= 1928 Michigan State Spartans football team =

American college football season

1928 Michigan State Spartans football
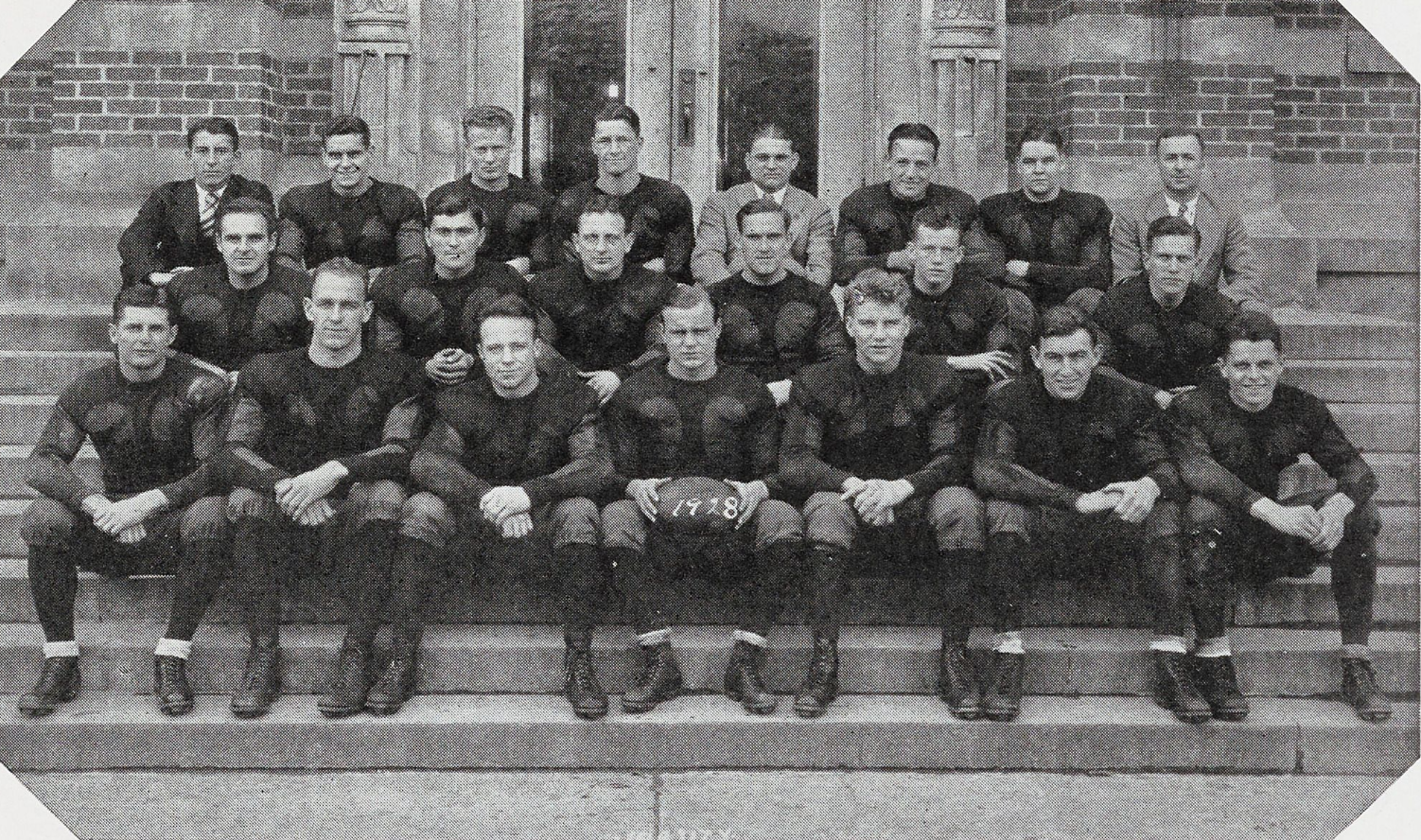
- Conference: Independent
- Record: 3–4–1
- Head coach: Harry Kipke (1st season)
- Captain: Lewis A. Hornbeck
- Home stadium: College Field

1928 Midwestern college football independents records
	Conf.			Overall
Team	W	L	T	W		L		T
Detroit		–		9	–	0	–	0
Butler		–		6	–	2	–	0
John Carroll		–		6	–	3	–	0
Kent State		–		4	–	2	–	2
Marquette		–		5	–	3	–	1
Ball Teachers		–		3	–	2	–	2
Notre Dame		–		5	–	4	–	0
DePaul		–		4	–	4	–	1
Haskell		–		5	–	5	–	0
Michigan Tech		–		2	–	2	–	1
Saint Louis		–		4	–	4	–	1
Wabash		–		4	–	4	–	1
Loyola (IL)		–		4	–	4	–	0
Lombard		–		3	–	4	–	1
Michigan State		–		3	–	4	–	1
Detroit City College		–		2	–	5	–	1
Valparaiso		–		1	–	6	–	0

The 1928 Michigan State Spartans football team represented Michigan State College (MAC) as an independent during the 1928 college football season. In their first and only year under head coach Harry Kipke, the Spartans compiled a 3–4–1 record and outscored their opponents 153 to 66.

On September 29, in their first game under coach Kipke, the Spartans scored 103 points against Kalamazoo, a total that was erroneously reported to be a school record. The team scored 39 points in the first half but scored at an even higher pace in the second half. The Spartans scored six touchdowns in the third quarter. Sophomore Carl Nordberg played quarterback, scored three touchdowns and was credited with running the team with precision and making several brilliant runs. Substitute halfback Max Crall scored four touchdowns, including long touchdown runs of 60 and 80 yards.

One week after their record-setting victory, the Spartans were upset by Albion by a 2 to 0 score. The game's only points were scored on a safety when Michigan State halfback Grove muffed a pass behind the goal line after trying to punt.

On November 17, the Spartans lost their annual rivalry game against Michigan by a 3–0 score in Ann Arbor.

In June 1929, Kipke was hired as the University of Michigan's new head coach. Upon being hired by Michigan, Kipke said, "Coaching Michigan is the greatest football job in America. I would be foolish to turn down such an offer. It has been one of my greatest ambitions in life."

== Schedule ==
Date	Opponent	Site	Result	Attendance	Source
September 29	Kalamazoo	College Field; East Lansing, MI	W 103–0	15,000	
October 6	Albion	College Field; East Lansing, MI	L 0–2	6,000–7,000	
October 13	Chicago YMCA	College Field; East Lansing, MI	W 37–0		
October 20	Colgate^{†}	College Field; East Lansing, MI	L 0–16	10,000	
November 3	Mississippi A&M	College Field; East Lansing, MI	T 6–6		
November 10	at Detroit	Dinan Field; Detroit, MI	L 0–39		
November 17	at Michigan	Michigan Stadium; Ann Arbor, MI (rivalry)	L 0–3	28,067	
November 24	NC State	College Field; East Lansing, MI	W 7–0		
^{†}Homecoming
