= 1928 Dayton Flyers football team =

American college football season

1928 Dayton Flyers football
- Conference: Ohio Athletic Conference
- Record: 6–3 (2–0 OAC)
- Head coach: Harry Baujan (6th season)
- Home stadium: University of Dayton Stadium

1928 Ohio Athletic Conference football standings
| | Conf. | | | | | Overall |
| Team | W | | L | | T | W | | L | | T |
|---|---|---|---|---|---|---|---|---|---|---|
| Heidelberg $ | 6 | – | 0 | – | 1 | 6 | – | 0 | – | 1 |
| Mount Union | 4 | – | 2 | – | 0 | 4 | – | 5 | – | 0 |
| Muskingum | 4 | – | 2 | – | 1 | 4 | – | 4 | – | 1 |
| Oberlin | 3 | – | 2 | – | 1 | 4 | – | 3 | – | 1 |
| Wooster | 2 | – | 2 | – | 2 | 2 | – | 4 | – | 2 |
| Akron | 3 | – | 4 | – | 0 | 5 | – | 4 | – | 0 |
| Hiram | 3 | – | 4 | – | 0 | 4 | – | 4 | – | 0 |
| Otterbein | 3 | – | 4 | – | 0 | 3 | – | 5 | – | 0 |
| Ohio Northern | 2 | – | 3 | – | 0 | 2 | – | 6 | – | 1 |
| Case | 1 | – | 4 | – | 1 | 2 | – | 6 | – | 1 |
| Capital | 1 | – | 5 | – | 0 | 1 | – | 6 | – | 1 |
| St. Xavier | 0 | – | 1 | – | 0 | 7 | – | 2 | – | 0 |
| Baldwin–Wallace | 0 | – | 8 | – | 0 | 0 | – | 8 | – | 0 |
| Kenyon | 0 | – | 5 | – | 0 | 0 | – | 7 | – | 0 |
| Western Reserve * | 8 | – | 0 | – | 0 | 8 | – | 0 | – | 0 |
| Marietta * | 4 | – | 0 | – | 0 | 4 | – | 2 | – | 1 |
| Dayton * | 2 | – | 0 | – | 0 | 6 | – | 3 | – | 0 |
$ – Conference champion; * – did not compete for championship

The 1928 Dayton Flyers football team was an American football team that represented the University of Dayton as a member of the Ohio Athletic Conference during the 1928 college football season. In its sixth season under head coach Harry Baujan, the team compiled a 6–3 record.

== Schedule ==
| Date | Opponent | Site | Result | Attendance | Source |
|---|---|---|---|---|---|
| September 29 | Findlay | University of Dayton Stadium; Dayton, OH | W 66–0 | | |
| October 6 | Wilmington (OH) | University of Dayton Stadium; Dayton, OH | W 28–0 | | |
| October 13 | at Brown | Providence, RI | L 7–13 | | |
| October 27 | Detroit | University of Dayton Stadium; Dayton, OH | L 0–7 | 5,000 | |
| November 3 | Loyola (IL) | University of Dayton Stadium; Dayton, OH | W 12–7 | | |
| November 10 | at Cincinnati | Nippert Stadium; Cincinnati, OH | W 25–6 | | |
| November 17 | Ohio Northern | University of Dayton Stadium; Dayton, OH | W 41–0 | | |
| November 24 | Muskingum | University of Dayton Stadium; Dayton, OH | W 48–0 | | |
| November 29 | Quantico Marines | University of Dayton Stadium; Dayton, OH | L 0–7 | 9,000-10,000 | |
