= 1928 Kansas State Wildcats football team =

American college football season

1928 Kansas State Wildcats football
- Conference: Big Six Conference
- Record: 3–5 (0–5 Big 6)
- Head coach: Bo McMillin (1st season)
- Home stadium: Memorial Stadium

1928 Big Six Conference football standings
	Conf.					Overall
Team	W		L		T	W		L		T
Nebraska $	5	–	0	–	0	7	–	1	–	1
Oklahoma	3	–	2	–	0	5	–	3	–	0
Missouri	3	–	2	–	0	4	–	4	–	0
Iowa State	2	–	2	–	1	2	–	5	–	1
Kansas	1	–	3	–	1	2	–	4	–	2
Kansas State	0	–	5	–	0	3	–	5	–	0
$ – Conference champion

The 1928 Kansas State Wildcats football team represented Kansas State University in the 1928 college football season.

== Schedule ==
Date	Opponent	Site	Result	Attendance
September 29	Bethany (KS)*	Memorial Stadium; Manhattan, KS	W 32–7	
October 6	at Oklahoma A&M*	Lewis Field; Stillwater, OK	W 13–6	
October 13	Hays Teachers*	Memorial Stadium; Manhattan, KS	W 22–7	
October 20	Kansas^{†}	Memorial Stadium; Manhattan, KS (rivalry)	L 0–7	
October 27	at Oklahoma	Oklahoma Memorial Stadium; Norman, OK	L 21–33	
November 10	Missouri	Memorial Stadium; Manhattan, KS	L 6–19	
November 17	at Iowa State	State Field; Ames, IA (rivalry)	L 0–7	
November 29	at Nebraska	Memorial Stadium; Lincoln, NE (rivalry)	L 0–8	10,000
*Non-conference game; ^{†}Homecoming
