= 1928 Detroit Titans football team =

American college football season

1928 Detroit Titans football

Co-national champion (Davis)
- Conference: Independent
- Record: 9–0
- Head coach: Gus Dorais (4th season)
- Captain: Tom Connell
- Home stadium: Dinan Field

1928 Midwestern college football independents records
	Conf.			Overall
Team	W	L	T	W		L		T
Detroit		–		9	–	0	–	0
Butler		–		6	–	2	–	0
John Carroll		–		6	–	3	–	0
Kent State		–		4	–	2	–	2
Marquette		–		5	–	3	–	1
Ball Teachers		–		3	–	2	–	2
Notre Dame		–		5	–	4	–	0
DePaul		–		4	–	4	–	1
Haskell		–		5	–	5	–	0
Michigan Tech		–		2	–	2	–	1
Saint Louis		–		4	–	4	–	1
Wabash		–		4	–	4	–	1
Loyola (IL)		–		4	–	4	–	0
Lombard		–		3	–	4	–	1
Michigan State		–		3	–	4	–	1
Detroit City College		–		2	–	5	–	1
Valparaiso		–		1	–	6	–	0

The 1928 Detroit Titans football team was an American football team that represented the University of Detroit (now known as the University of Detroit Mercy) as an independent during the 1928 college football season. In their fourth year under head coach and Gus Dorais, the Titans compiled a perfect 9–0 record, shut out seven of nine opponents, and outscored all opponents by a total of 267 to 27. The team has been recognized as a co-national champion of 1928 by Parke H. Davis. Significant games included victories over Tulsa (19–14), Louisville (46–0), Michigan State (39–0), and Fordham (19–0).

The team was led by halfback Lloyd Brazil who was selected by Grantland Rice as the first-team utility back on the 1928 All-America college football team. During the 1928 season, Brazil set a new NCAA major college record with 997 passing yards. In 1929, he led the NCAA major colleges with 1,117 rushing yards and also led in total offense. Halfback and team captain Tom Connell also starred for the 1928 Titans, ranking as one of the country's leading scorers with 105 points.

The 1928 Detroit team was inducted into the Detroit Mercy Titans Hall of Fame in 2023. The team played its home games at Dinan Field on Six Mile Road in Detroit.

== Schedule ==
Date	Opponent	Site	Result	Attendance	Source
September 29	DePaul	Dinan Field; Detroit, MI	W 39–0		
October 6	at Tulsa	McNulty Park; Tulsa, OK	W 19–14		
October 13	Louisville	Dinan Field; Detroit, MI	W 46–0		
October 20	Loyola (LA)	Dinan Field; Detroit, MI	W 27–0	15,000	
October 27	at Dayton	Dayton, OH	W 7–0	5,000	
November 3	Saint Louis	Dinan Field; Detroit, MI	W 38–0		
November 10	Michigan State	Dinan Field; Detroit, MI	W 39–0		
November 17	at Fordham	Polo Grounds; New York, NY	W 7–0	5,000	
December 1	Georgetown	Dinan Field; Detroit, MI	W 33–13	30,000	

== Season summary ==
=== DePaul ===
On September 29, the Titans opened their season by defeating DePaul, 39–0, at Dinan Field in Detroit. It was the first meeting between the Detroit and DePaul football programs. The Titans scored two touchdowns in the first quarter beginning with a 33-yard touchdown run by Lloyd Brazil. They added one touchdown in the second and three in the fourth. On the final drive, substitute guard Chuck Masacek intercepted a pass and returned it 65 yards for the final points.

=== At Tulsa ===
On October 6, the Titans defeated Tulsa, 19–14, in 90 degree heat with high humidity in Tulsa, Oklahoma. The Golden Hurricane, which went on to win the Missouri Valley Conference championship, took a 7-0 lead in the first quarter. The Titans scored their first touchdown on a double pass play, as fullback Ed Maloney threw the ball across the line of scrimmage to end Nate Goodnow who then shot the ball back across the field to a wide open halfback Lloyd Brazil who ran for a long touchdown. The kick for extra point was blocked and Tulsa led, 7-6. A fumble by Maloney set up a second Tulsa touchdown on a run by Chet Benefiel, and the Golden Hurricane held onto a 14-13 lead going into the fourth quarter. Detroit center Merril Lardner lept high in the air to intercept a Tulsa pass to set up the game-winning drive. Halfback and captain Tom Connell scored the winning touchdown on a six-yard run.

=== Louisville ===
On October 13, the Titans defeated Louisville, 46–0, at Dinan Field in Detroit. The Titans starters played only in the second quarter and tallied four touchdowns in that span. The Titans reserves played most of the game. Louisville was limited to three first downs in the game, compared to 23 for the Titans. Halfback Tom Connell scored two touchdowns and kicked three extra points. Quarterback Les Vachon also scored two touchdowns. Lloyd Brazil ran for a touchdown and threw for another. Fullback Jerry White also scored a touchdown.

=== Loyola ===
On October 20, the Titans defeated Loyola of New Orleans, 27–0, before a crowd of more than 15,000 at Dinan Field. This was the same Loyola team that played a close game with Notre Dame two weeks earlier. W.W. Edgar of The Detroit Free Press credited the play of tackle Harvey Long with playing "the best game of his meteoric career", repeatedly breaking through the line to stop plays behind the line, and being "a stone wall on defense."

=== At Dayton ===
On October 27, the Titans defeated Dayton, 7–0, in Dayton's homecoming game. Halfback and team captain Tom Connell scored the game's only touchdown in the first quarter. The game was played in drizzling rain on a soggy and slippery field that handicapped the offense of both teams. Aside from the work of Connell, W.W. Edgar of The Detroit Free Press described the game as "a drab affair in which neither team played up to the accepted standard."

=== Saint Louis ===
On November 3, the Titans defeated Saint Louis, 38–0, at Dinan Field in Detroit. It was the Titans' eighth straight victory over the Billikens dating back to 1920. The Titans tallied three touchdowns in the second quarter, one in the third, and two in the fourth. A brawl broke out between the players in the third quarter in which "several impromptu knockdowns were scored" before the officials restored order.

=== Michigan State ===
On November 10, the Titans defeated Harry Kipke's Michigan State Spartans, 39–0, at Dinan Field in Detroit. Halfbacks Lloyd Brazil and Tom Connell each scored two touchdowns in the game.

=== At Fordham ===
On November 17, the Titans defeated Fordham, 19–0, before a crowd of 5,000 at the Polo Grounds in New York City. Tom Connell scored three touchdowns (two in the second quarter and one in the third) and kicked an extra point, accounting for all 19 Detroit points. W. W. Edgar of The Detroit Free Press described the Titans as a "red-jerseyed hurricane" that "whirled Fordham's football machine into a badly twisted mass of ruins."

=== Georgetown ===
On December 1, the Titans defeated Georgetown, 33–13, before a crowd of 30,000, the largest ever at Detroit's Dinan Field. Lou Little's Georgetown team came into the game having compiled an 8–1 record, including victories over Duke, West Virginia, NYU, and Fordham. Detroit's victory over the Hoyas capped an undefeated season. In his final game for the Titans, halfback Tom Connell returned the opening kickoff 96 yards for a touchdown, scored two more touchdowns in the second half, kicked three extra points, and finished the season with 105 points scored. Nathan Goodnow and Ed Maloney also scored touchdowns for the Titans. Detroit supporters carried Connell and Lloyd Brazil off the field in celebration of the victory.

== Players ==
- Arthur Anderson, tackle
- Eddie Barbour, quarterback
- John Bossenberger, tackle
- Lloyd Brazil, left halfback, Flint, Michigan
- Neil Brown, end
- Harry Buckman, guard
- Tommy Burns, halfback
- Tom Connell, right halfback and captain, Chippewa Falls, Wisconsin
- James Dolance, guard
- Joe Friske, halfback
- Nate Goodnow, end
- Hart, tackle
- Francis Kenney, guard
- Kendry, guard
- Merril Lardner, center
- Harvey Long, guard/tackle
- Jay Maley, quarterback
- Ed Maloney, fullback
- Joe Marcero
- Chuck Masacek, guard
- Arthur Massucci, tackle
- Sam Merriman, halfback
- Ray Navin, end
- Bill O'Halloran, guard
- Vincent Olshove, end
- Anthony Petz, center
- Francis "Benny" Phelan, end
- Gus Rihlin, tackle/guard
- Charles Roney, center
- John Ryan, tackle
- Billy Storen, reserve halfback
- Les Vachon, quarterback
- Jerry White, fullback
- Herman Young, end
- Firmin Zettel, fullback/halfback
