= 1928 Haskell Indians football team =

American college football season

1928 Haskell Indians football
- Conference: Independent
- Record: 5–5
- Head coach: John Webster Thomas (2nd season)
- Captain: Albert Hawley
- Home stadium: Haskell Stadium

1928 Midwestern college football independents records
	Conf.			Overall
Team	W	L	T	W		L		T
Detroit		–		9	–	0	–	0
Butler		–		6	–	2	–	0
John Carroll		–		6	–	3	–	0
Kent State		–		4	–	2	–	2
Marquette		–		5	–	3	–	1
Ball Teachers		–		3	–	2	–	2
Notre Dame		–		5	–	4	–	0
DePaul		–		4	–	4	–	1
Haskell		–		5	–	5	–	0
Michigan Tech		–		2	–	2	–	1
Saint Louis		–		4	–	4	–	1
Wabash		–		4	–	4	–	1
Loyola (IL)		–		4	–	4	–	0
Lombard		–		3	–	4	–	1
Michigan State		–		3	–	4	–	1
Detroit City College		–		2	–	5	–	1
Valparaiso		–		1	–	6	–	0

The 1928 Haskell Indians football team was an American football that represented the Haskell Institute (now known as Haskell Indian Nations University) during the 1928 college football season. In its second and final year under head coach John Webster Thomas, the team compiled a 5–5 record.

== Schedule ==
Date	Time	Opponent	Site	Result	Attendance	Source
September 29		Simpson (IA)	Haskell Stadium; Lawrence, KS	W 25–7		
October 6		vs. West Virginia	Wheeling, WV	L 7–28	6,500	
October 13		vs. Loyola (IL)	Muehlebach Field; Kansas City, MO	W 6–0		
October 27		at Regis (CO)	Denver, CO	W 14–9		
November 3	2:00 p.m.	at Washington University	Francis Field; St. Louis, MO	W 7–0	4,000	
November 10		at Loyola (LA)	Loyola University Stadium; New Orleans, LA	L 0–20		
November 17		at Minnesota	Memorial Stadium; Minneapolis, MN	L 0–52	20,000	
November 23		Nebraska Wesleyan	Haskell Stadium; Lawrence, KS	W 60–0		
November 29		at St. Xavier	Corcoran Field; Cincinnati, OH	L 0–26	13,000	
December 8		at Tulsa*	McNulty Park; Tulsa, OK	L 6–27	4,500	
*Non-conference game; All times are in Central time

== Roster ==
Official photo of the 1928 Haskell Indians football team
