= 1928 Grinnell Pioneers football team =

American college football season

1928 Grinnell Pioneers football
- Conference: Missouri Valley Conference
- Record: 4–3–1 (1–2 MVC)
- Head coach: Lester Watt (2nd season)
- Home stadium: Ward Field

1928 Missouri Valley Conference football standings
| | Conf. | | | | | Overall |
| Team | W | | L | | T | W | | L | | T |
|---|---|---|---|---|---|---|---|---|---|---|
| Drake $ | 3 | – | 0 | – | 0 | 7 | – | 1 | – | 0 |
| Creighton | 2 | – | 1 | – | 0 | 3 | – | 5 | – | 1 |
| Grinnell | 1 | – | 2 | – | 0 | 4 | – | 3 | – | 1 |
| Oklahoma A&M | 0 | – | 1 | – | 0 | 1 | – | 7 | – | 0 |
| Washington University | 0 | – | 2 | – | 0 | 2 | – | 5 | – | 1 |
$ – Conference champion

The 1928 Grinnell Pioneers football team represented Grinnell College as a member of the Missouri Valley Conference (MVC) during the 1928 college football season. Led by second-year head coach Lester Watt, the Pioneers compiled an overall record of 4–3–1 with a mark of 1–2 in conference play, placing third in the MVC.

== Schedule ==
| Date | Time | Opponent | Site | Result | Attendance | Source |
|---|---|---|---|---|---|---|
| September 29 | | Penn (IA)* | Ward Field; Grinnell, IA | W 19–6 | | |
| October 6 | | at Kansas* | Memorial Stadium; Lawrence, KS | L 0–14 | | |
| October 13 | | Iowa State*^{†} | Ward Field; Grinnell, IA | W 3–0 | 2,125–2,500 | |
| October 20 | | at Drake | Drake Stadium; Des Moines, IA | L 7–19 | 10,000 | |
| November 3 | | Marquette* | Ward Field; Grinnell, IA | W 20–13 | | |
| November 10 | | at Iowa State Teachers* | Cedar Falls, IA | T 0–0 | | |
| November 17 | 2:00 p.m. | at Washington University | Francis Field; St. Louis, MO | W 7–6 | 6,500 | |
| November 23 | | Creighton | Ward Field; Grinnell, IA | L 19–20 | | |
*Non-conference game; ^{†}Homecoming; All times are in Central time
