= L. T. Harr =

American football coach and administrator (1896–1982)

Biographical details
- Born: April 14, 1896; Auburn, Kansas, U.S.
- Died: December 23, 1982 (aged 86); Fort Collins, Colorado, U.S.

Playing career
- 1916: College of Emporia
- 1919–1921: College of Emporia
- Positions: End, tackle

Coaching career (HC unless noted)
- 1924–1927: College of Emporia (assistant)
- 1928–1930: College of Emporia
- 1942: College of Emporia

Administrative career (AD unless noted)
- 1928–1931: College of Emporia

Head coaching record
- Overall: 12–15–5

Accomplishments and honors

Championships
- 1 CIC (1928)

Lloyd Trevalyn "Rosy" Harr (April 14, 1896 – December 23, 1982) was an American college football coach and athletics administrator. He served as the head football coach at the College of Emporia in Emporia, Kansas from 1928 to 1930 and again in 1942, compiling a record of 12–15–5. His 1928 team produced an undefeated record of 8–0, did not allow a single point, and was declared the champions of the newly-formed Central Intercollegiate Conference (CIC). Harr was also the athletic director at the College of Emporia until his resignation in 1931. He returned to the College of Emporia in 1942 as physical director and coach.

Harr played football as an end and tackle for four seasons at the College of Emporia. His college career was interrupted by World War I, during which he served in the United States Army overseas with the 35th Infantry Division. After the war, he reentered college, and played under head coach Gwinn Henry. Following his graduation from college, Harr went into the electrical business in Emporia for two years. He returned to the College of Emporia in 1924 as head of the physical training department for men and assistant coach under head coach Harold Grant. Harr succeeded Grant as head football coach in 1928.

Harr died on December 23, 1982, in Fort Collins, Colorado.

== Head coaching record ==
| Year | Team | Overall | Conference | Standing |
|---|---|---|---|---|
College of Emporia Fighting Presbies (Central Intercollegiate Conference) (1928–1930)
| 1928 | College of Emporia | 8–0 | 6–0 | 1st |
| 1929 | College of Emporia | 3–3–2 | 2–2–2 | T–3rd |
| 1930 | College of Emporia | 0–7–2 | 0–4–2 | 7th |
College of Emporia Fighting Presbies (Kansas Collegiate Athletic Conference) (1942)
| 1942 | College of Emporia | 1–5–1 | 1–4–1 | T–5th |
| College of Emporia: | | 12–15–5 | 9–10–5 | |
| Total: | | 12–15–5 | | |
National championship Conference title Conference division title or championship game berth
