= 1942 College of Emporia Fighting Presbies football team =

American college football season

1942 College of Emporia Fighting Presbies football
- Conference: Kansas Collegiate Athletic Conference
- Record: 1–5–1 (1–4–1 KCAC)
- Head coach: L. T. Harr (4th season)

1942 Kansas Collegiate Athletic Conference football standings
	Conf.					Overall
Team	W		L		T	W		L		T
Baker $	6	–	0	–	0	7	–	0	–	0
Ottawa	4	–	1	–	1	5	–	1	–	1
Kansas Wesleyan	3	–	1	–	2	5	–	4	–	2
Bethany (KS)	3	–	2	–	1	3	–	3	–	1
McPherson	1	–	4	–	1	1	–	4	–	3
College of Emporia	1	–	4	–	1	1	–	5	–	1
Bethel (KS)	0	–	6	–	0	2	–	6	–	1
$ – Conference champion

The 1942 College of Emporia Fighting Presbies football team represented College of Emporia as a member of the Kansas Collegiate Athletic Conference (KCAC) during the 1942 college football season. Led by L. T. Harr in his fourth and final season head coach, the Fighting Presbies compiled an overall record of 1–5–1 with a mark of 1–4–1 in conference play, tying for fifth place in the KCAC.

A graduate of the College of Emporia, Harr was a head coach at the school from 1928 to 1931. He returned in 1942 as a physical director and coach.

== Schedule ==
Date	Opponent	Site	Result	Source
September 26	at Bethany (KS)	Lindsborg, KS	L 0–19	
October 9	at Southwestern (KS)	Winfield, KS	L 0–34	
October 16	Baker	Emporia, KS	L 0–33	
October 23	at Kansas Wesleyan	Salina, KS	L 0–21	
October 31	McPherson	Emporia, KS	T 0–0	
November 6	at Ottawa (KS)	Ottawa, KS	L 0–19	
November 13	Bethel (KS)	Emporia, KS	W 27–12	
