= 1928 Creighton Bluejays football team =

American college football season

1928 Creighton Bluejays football
- Conference: Missouri Valley Conference
- Record: 3–5–1 (2–1 MVC)
- Head coach: Chet A. Wynne (6th season)
- Home stadium: Creighton Stadium

1928 Missouri Valley Conference football standings
	Conf.					Overall
Team	W		L		T	W		L		T
Drake $	3	–	0	–	0	7	–	1	–	0
Creighton	2	–	1	–	0	3	–	5	–	1
Grinnell	1	–	2	–	0	4	–	3	–	1
Oklahoma A&M	0	–	1	–	0	1	–	7	–	0
Washington University	0	–	2	–	0	2	–	5	–	1
$ – Conference champion

The 1928 Creighton Bluejays football team was an American football team that represented Creighton University as a member of the Missouri Valley Conference (MVC) during the 1928 college football season. In its sixth season under head coach Chet A. Wynne, the team compiled a 3–5–1 record (2–1 against MVC opponents) and was outscored by a total of 128 to 86. The team played its home games at Creighton Stadium in Omaha, Nebraska.

== Schedule ==
Date	Opponent	Site	Result	Attendance	Source
October 6	at Minnesota*	Memorial Stadium; Minneapolis, MN	L 0–49	20,000	
October 13	Oklahoma A&M	Creighton Stadium; Omaha, NE	W 37–0		
October 20	Oklahoma*	Creighton Stadium; Omaha, NE	L 0–7		
October 27	at Saint Louis*	Sportsman's Park; St. Louis, MO	L 6–16		
November 3	at South Dakota State*	Brookings, SD	L 7–18		
November 10	Utah*	Creighton Stadium; Omaha, NE	T 7–7		
November 23	at Grinnell	Ward Field; Grinnell, IA	W 20–19		
November 29	Drake	Creighton Stadium; Omaha, NE	L 0–6		
December 8	at Marquette*	Marquette Stadium; Milwaukee, WI	W 9–6	5,000	
*Non-conference game
