= Tom Connell (American football) =

American football player and coach (1905–1976)

- Tom Connell, c. 1960

Profile
- Position: Halfback

Personal information
- Born: January 29, 1905; Wisconsin, U.S.
- Died: August 25, 1976 (age 71); Michigan, U.S.

Career information
- College: University of Detroit (1926–1928)

Thomas F. "Cowboy" Connell (January 29, 1905–August 25, 1976) was an American football player and coach.

Connell was born in Wisconsin in 1906. He played at the halfback position for the University of Detroit Titans football team and was captain of the undefeated 1928 team that was selected by Parke H. Davis as that year's national champion. He scored 126 or 133 points in 1928, ranking second in scoring nationally. He was also the captain of the 1927 Detroit team and the first Detroit player to be twice selected as captain.

After graduating, he remained in Detroit as an automobile salesman. He was married in 1932 to Josephine Gleason, a music teacher. He was head football coach at Our Lady of Lourdes High School in River Rouge, Michigan, for 23 years, compiling a 106-43-12 record. He died in 1976.
