= College football =

College version of American/Canadian gridiron football

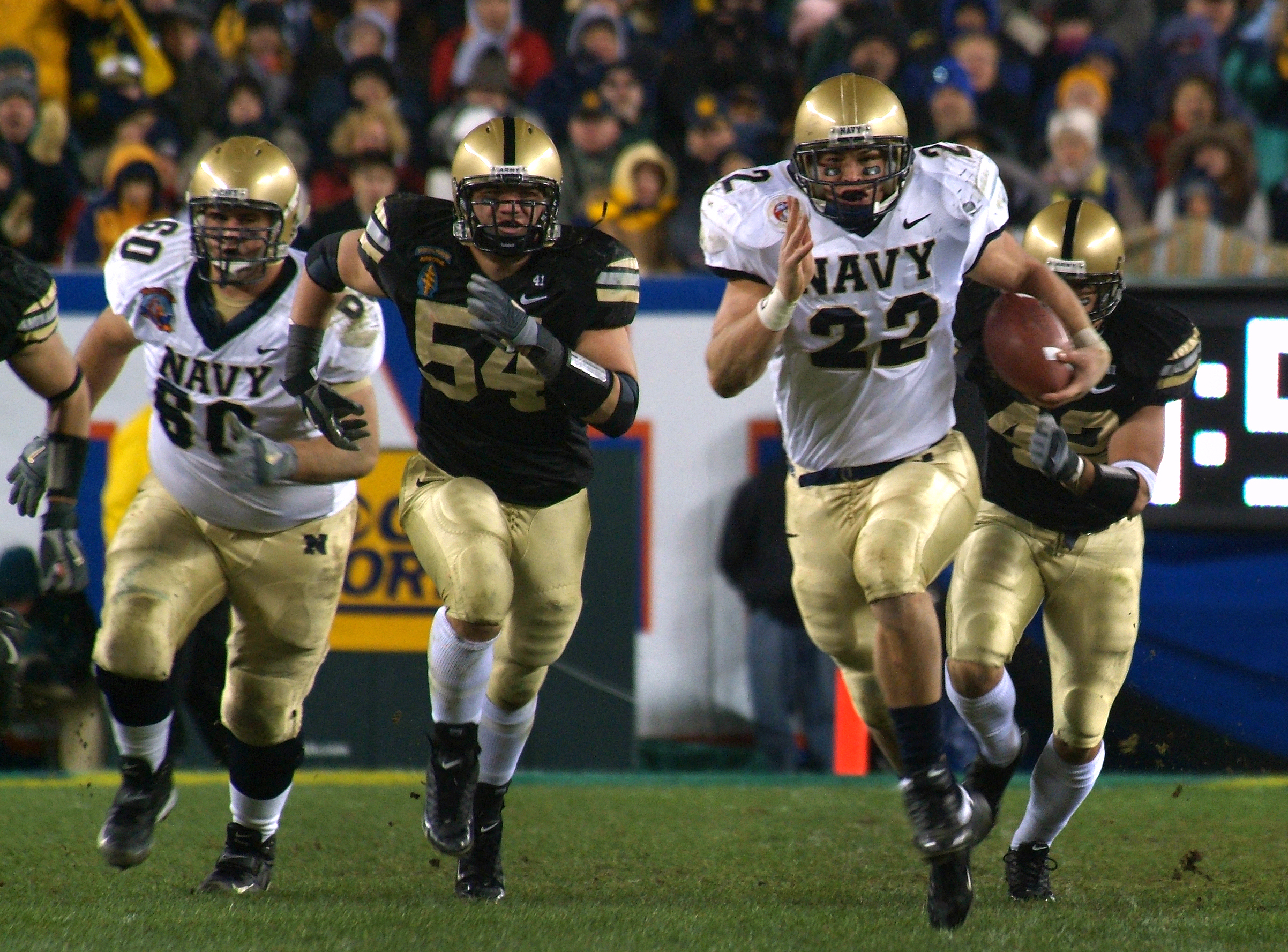
- Navy fullback Adam Ballard (#22) rushes while being pursued by Army defenders Cason Shrode (#54) and Taylor Justice (#42) in the 2005 Army–Navy Game, a college football rivalry in the U.S.
- Governing body: NCAA; NAIA; NCCAA; NJCAA; USCAA; 3C2A; U Sports
- First played: 1869

Club competitions
- NCAA: Division I (FBS); Playoff National (FBS); Division I (FCS); Division II; Division III; NAIA: National Championship; NJCAA: National Championship; U Sports: Vanier Cup

Audience records
- Single match: 156,990 (Tennessee 45–24 Virginia Tech at Bristol Motor Speedway), 10 Sep 2016

College football is gridiron football that is played by teams of student-athletes at universities and colleges. It was through collegiate competition that gridiron football first gained popularity in the United States.

Like other types of gridiron football, college football is most popular in the United States and Canada. While no single governing body exists for college football in the United States, most schools, especially those at the highest levels of play, are members of the National Collegiate Athletic Association (NCAA). In Canada, collegiate football competition is governed by U Sports for universities. The Canadian Collegiate Athletic Association (for colleges) governs soccer and other sports but not gridiron football. Other countries, such as Mexico, Japan and South Korea, also host college football leagues with modest levels of support.

Unlike most other major sports in North America, no official minor league farm organizations exist for American football or Canadian football. Therefore, college football is generally considered to be the second tier of American and Canadian football, ahead of high school competition but below professional competition. In some parts of the United States, especially the South and Midwest, college football is more popular than professional football. For much of the 20th century, college football was generally considered to be more prestigious than professional football.

The overwhelming majority of professional football players in the National Football League (NFL) and other leagues previously played college football, with players who previously played in the NCAA Division I Football Bowl Subdivision, the highest level of college football in the United States, making up 92.7% of the NFL's total active roster during the 2025 season. The NFL draft each spring sees 224 players selected and offered a contract to play in the league, with the vast majority coming from the NCAA. Other professional leagues, such as the Canadian Football League (CFL) and United Football League (UFL), hold their own drafts each year that also involve primarily college players selected. Players who are not selected can still attempt to win a professional roster spot as an undrafted free agent. Despite these opportunities, only around 1.6% of NCAA college football players eventually play professionally in the NFL.

== History ==
Even after the emergence of the professional National Football League (NFL), college football has remained extremely popular throughout the U.S. Although the college game has a much larger margin for talent than its pro counterpart, the sheer number of fans following major colleges provides a financial equalizer for the game, with Division I programs – the highest level – playing in huge stadiums, six of which have seating capacity exceeding 100,000 people. In many cases, college stadiums employ bench-style seating, as opposed to individual seats with backs and arm rests (although many stadiums do have a small number of chair back seats in addition to the bench seating). This allows them to seat more fans in a given amount of space than the typical professional stadium, which tends to have more features and comforts for fans. Only three stadiums owned by U.S. colleges or universities, L&N Stadium at the University of Louisville, Center Parc Stadium at Georgia State University (which itself was a reconstruction of Turner Field which was a reconstruction of Centennial Olympic Stadium), and FAU Stadium at Florida Atlantic University, consist entirely of chair back seating.

=== Early history ===
Modern North American football has its origins in various games, all known as "football", played at public schools in Great Britain in the mid-19th century. Early 19th century American college students played a disorganized game resembling medieval mob football. In 1827, a Harvard tradition known as "Bloody Monday" began, which consisted of a mass ballgame between the freshman and sophomore classes. Violent games such as this were banned from college campuses around 1860.

By the 1840s, students at Britain's Rugby School were playing a game in which players were able to pick up the ball and run with it, a sport later known as rugby football. The game was taken to Canada by British soldiers stationed there and was soon being played at Canadian colleges. The first documented gridiron football game was played at University College, a college of the University of Toronto, on November 9, 1861. In 1864, at Trinity College, also a college of the University of Toronto, F. Barlow Cumberland and Frederick A. Bethune devised rules based on rugby football.

The first game
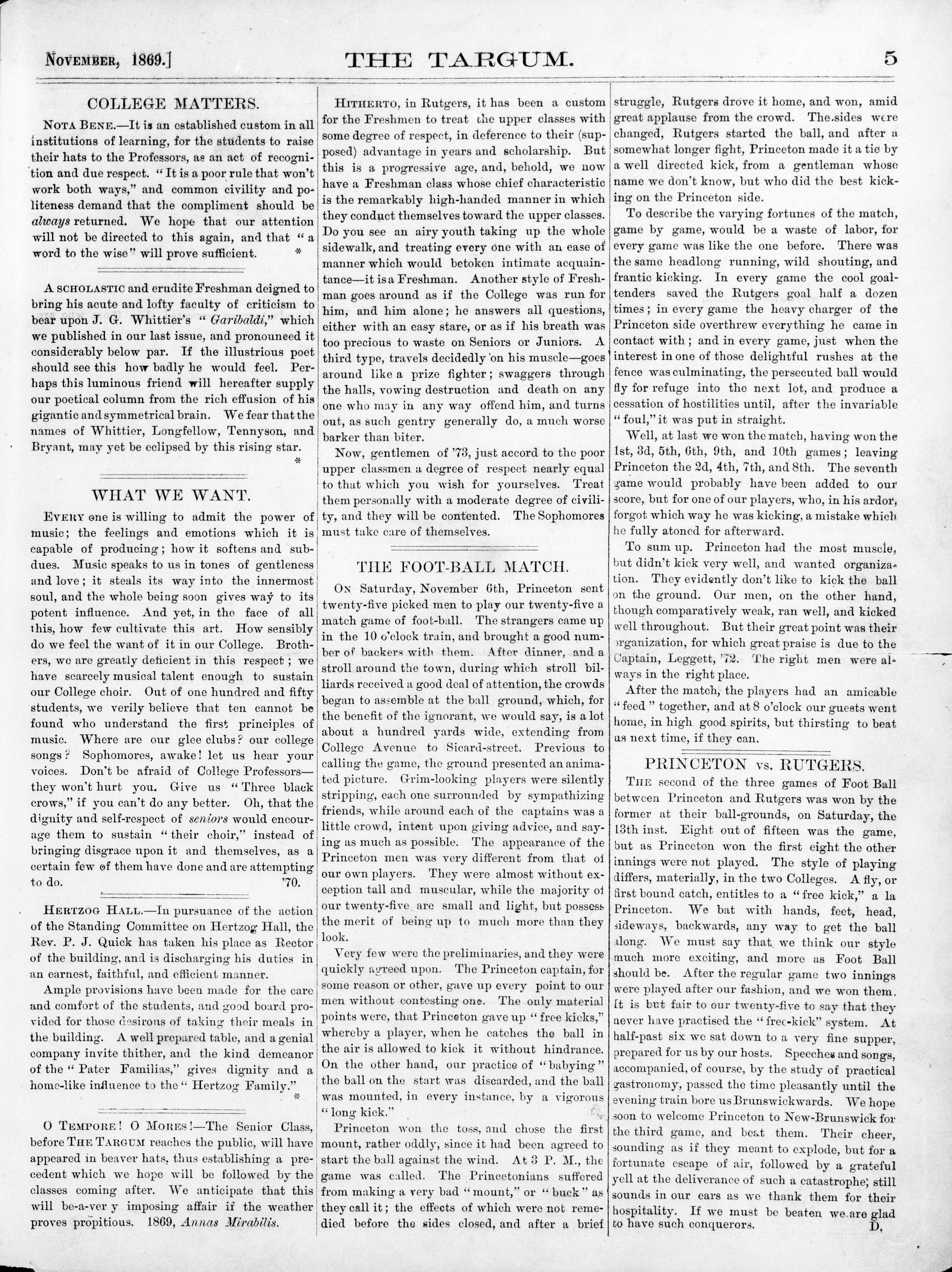
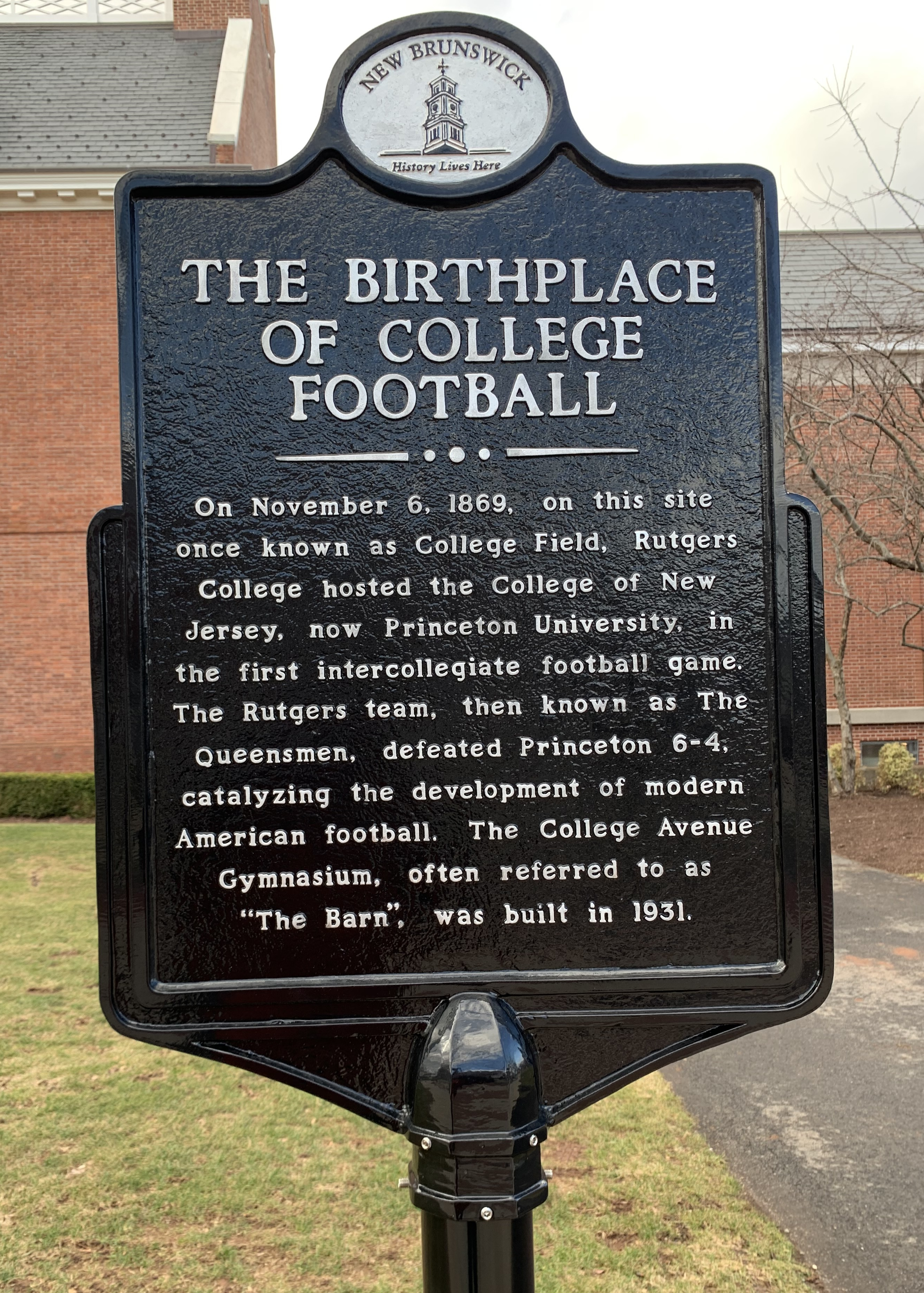
Left: "The Foot-Ball Match", a news article on the first college football game ever played, published in The Targum, the Rutgers University student newspaper, in November 1869. Right: A plaque on College Avenue on the campus of Rutgers University in New Brunswick, New Jersey commemorating the location where the first intercollegiate football game was played.

On November 6, 1869, Rutgers University faced Princeton University, then known as the College of New Jersey, in the first collegiate football game. The game more closely resembled soccer than rugby or gridiron football. It was played with a round ball, and used a set of rules based on The Football Association's first set of rules.

By 1873, representatives from Yale, Columbia, Princeton, and Rutgers met at the Fifth Avenue Hotel in New York City to codify the first set of intercollegiate football rules, based closely on association football (i.e., soccer). Before this meeting, each school had its own set of rules and games were usually played using the home team's own particular code. However, the colleges coming to an agreement on soccer-like rules were unable to obtain the crucial support of Harvard University, which had been playing its own intramural football based on an informal style called the "Boston game".

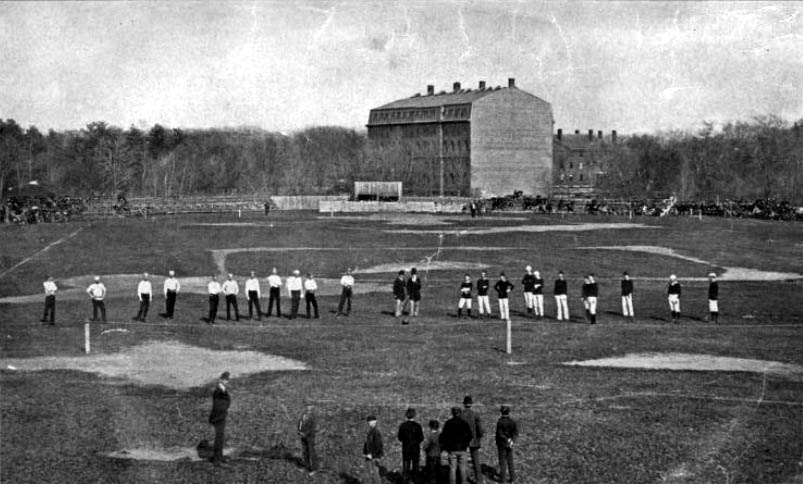
The McGill vs. Harvard football game in Cambridge, Massachusetts in 1874; Harvard won 3–0.

Unable to agree upon rules with American colleges, Harvard instead played multiple games against McGill University in 1874. In as much as Rugby football had been transplanted to Canada from England, the McGill team played under a set of rules which allowed a player to pick up the ball and run with it whenever he wished. Another rule, unique to McGill, was to count tries (the act of grounding the football past the opposing team's goal line; there was no end zone during this time), as well as goals, in the scoring. In the Rugby rules of the time, a try only provided the attempt to kick a free goal from the field. If the kick was missed, the try did not score any points itself. Harvard players were enthusiastic about McGill's rules and quickly abandoned most of the "Boston game."

In 1875, Harvard played with adapted McGill rugby rules against Tufts, and then against its closest rival, Yale. Yale and Harvard agreed to play under a set of rules called the "Concessionary Rules", which involved Harvard conceding something to Yale's soccer and Yale conceding a great deal to Harvard's rugby. On November 13, 1875, Yale and Harvard played each other for the first time ever, where Harvard won 4–0. At the first The Game, as the annual contest between Harvard and Yale came to be named, the future "father of American football" Walter Camp was among the 2000 spectators in attendance. Spectators from Princeton also carried the game back home, where it quickly became the most popular version of football.

On November 23, 1876, representatives from Harvard, Yale, Princeton, and Columbia met at the Massasoit House hotel in Springfield, Massachusetts to standardize a new code of rules based on the rugby game first introduced to Harvard by McGill University in 1874. Three of the schools—Harvard, Columbia, and Princeton—formed the Intercollegiate Football Association, as a result of the meeting. Yale initially refused to join this association because of a disagreement over the number of players to be allowed per team (relenting in 1879) and Rutgers were not invited to the meeting. The rules that they agreed upon were essentially those of rugby union at the time with the exception that points be awarded for scoring a try, not just the conversion afterwards (extra point).

Although American football was developed with input from McGill University, Canada had formed a separate amateur rugby league in 1873, the Foot Ball Association of Canada. The Canadian Rugby Football Union, founded in 1880, closely imitated American football rules, but interest in collegiate sports in Canada flagged over the succeeding decades and American football developed much more rapidly.

==== Walter Camp: father of American football ====
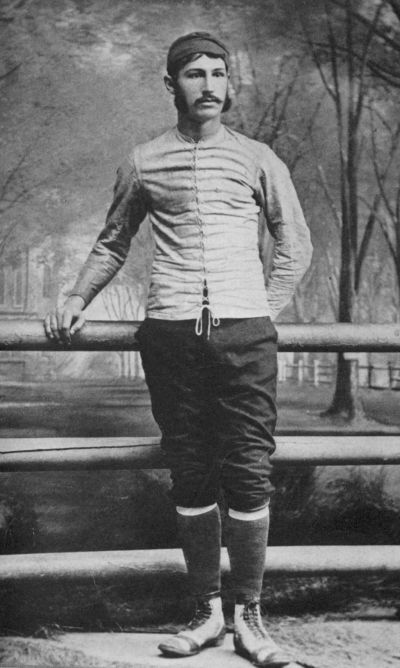
Walter Camp, the "Father of American Football", then the captain of the Yale University football team, in 1878

Walter Camp is widely considered to be the most important figure in the development of American football. Following the introduction of rugby-style rules to American football, Camp became a fixture at the Massasoit House conventions where rules were debated and changed. He reduced the number of players from 15 to 11 and established the line of scrimmage and the snap from center to quarterback. Originally, the snap was executed with the foot of the center. Later changes made it possible to snap the ball with the hands, either through the air or by a direct hand-to-hand pass.

Camp's new scrimmage rules revolutionized the game, though not always as intended. Princeton, in particular, used scrimmage play to slow the game, making incremental progress towards the end zone during each down. Rather than increase scoring, which had been Camp's original intent, the rule was exploited to maintain control of the ball for the entire game, resulting in slow, unexciting contests. At the 1882 rules meeting, Camp proposed that a team be required to advance the ball a minimum of five yards within three downs. These down-and-distance rules, combined with the establishment of the line of scrimmage, transformed the game from a variation of rugby football into the distinct sport of American football.

=== Scoring table ===
Historical college football scoring
Era	Touchdown	Field goal	Conversion (kick)	Conversion (touchdown)	Safety	Conversion safety	Defensive conversion
1883	2	5	4	–	1	–	–
1883–1897	4	5	2	–	2	–	–
1898–1903	5	5	1	–	2	–	–
1904–1908	5	4	1	–	2	–	–
1909–1911	5	3	1	–	2	–	–
1912–1957	6	3	1	–	2	–	–
1958–1987	6	3	1	2	2	1	–
1988–present	6	3	1	2	2	1	2
Note: For brief periods in the late 19th century, some penalties awarded one or more points for the opposing teams, and some teams in the late 19th and early 20th centuries chose to negotiate their own scoring system for individual games.

=== Expansion ===
College football expanded greatly during the last two decades of the 19th century. Several major rivalries date from this time period.

November 1890 was an active time in the sport. In Baldwin City, Kansas, on November 22, 1890, college football was first played in the state of Kansas. Baker beat Kansas 22–9. On the 27th, Vanderbilt played Nashville (Peabody) at Athletic Park and won 40–0. It was the first time organized football played in the state of Tennessee. The 29th also saw the first instance of the Army–Navy Game. Navy won 24–0.

==== East ====
Rutgers was first to extend the reach of the game. An intercollegiate game was first played in the state of New York when Rutgers played Columbia on November 2, 1872. It was also the first scoreless tie in the history of the fledgling sport. Yale football starts the same year and has its first match against Columbia, the nearest college to play football. It took place at Hamilton Park in New Haven and was the first game in New England. The game was essentially soccer with 20-man sides, played on a field 400 by 250 feet. Yale wins 3–0, Tommy Sherman scoring the first goal and Lew Irwin the other two.

After the first game against Harvard, Tufts took its squad to Bates College in Lewiston, Maine for the first football game played in Maine. This occurred on November 6, 1875.

Penn's Athletic Association was looking to pick "a twenty" to play a game of football against Columbia. This "twenty" never played Columbia, but did play twice against Princeton. Princeton won both games 6 to 0. The first of these happened on November 11, 1876, in Philadelphia and was the first intercollegiate game in the state of Pennsylvania.

Brown entered the intercollegiate game in 1878. Penn State played its first season in 1887, but had no head coach for their first five years, from 1887 to 1891. In 1891, the Pennsylvania Intercollegiate Football Association (PIFA) was formed. It consisted of Bucknell University, Dickinson College, Franklin & Marshall College, Haverford College, Penn State, and Swarthmore College. Lafayette College, and Lehigh University were excluded because it was felt they would dominate the Association. Penn State won the championship with a 4–1–0 record. Bucknell's record was 3–1–1 (losing to Franklin & Marshall and tying Dickinson). The Association was dissolved prior to the 1892 season.

The first nighttime football game was played in Mansfield, Pennsylvania on September 28, 1892, between Mansfield State Normal and Wyoming Seminary and ended at halftime in a 0–0 tie. The Army–Navy game of 1893 saw the first documented use of a football helmet by a player in a game. Joseph M. Reeves had a crude leather helmet made by a shoemaker in Annapolis and wore it in the game after being warned by his doctor that he risked death if he continued to play football after suffering an earlier kick to the head.

==== Middle West ====
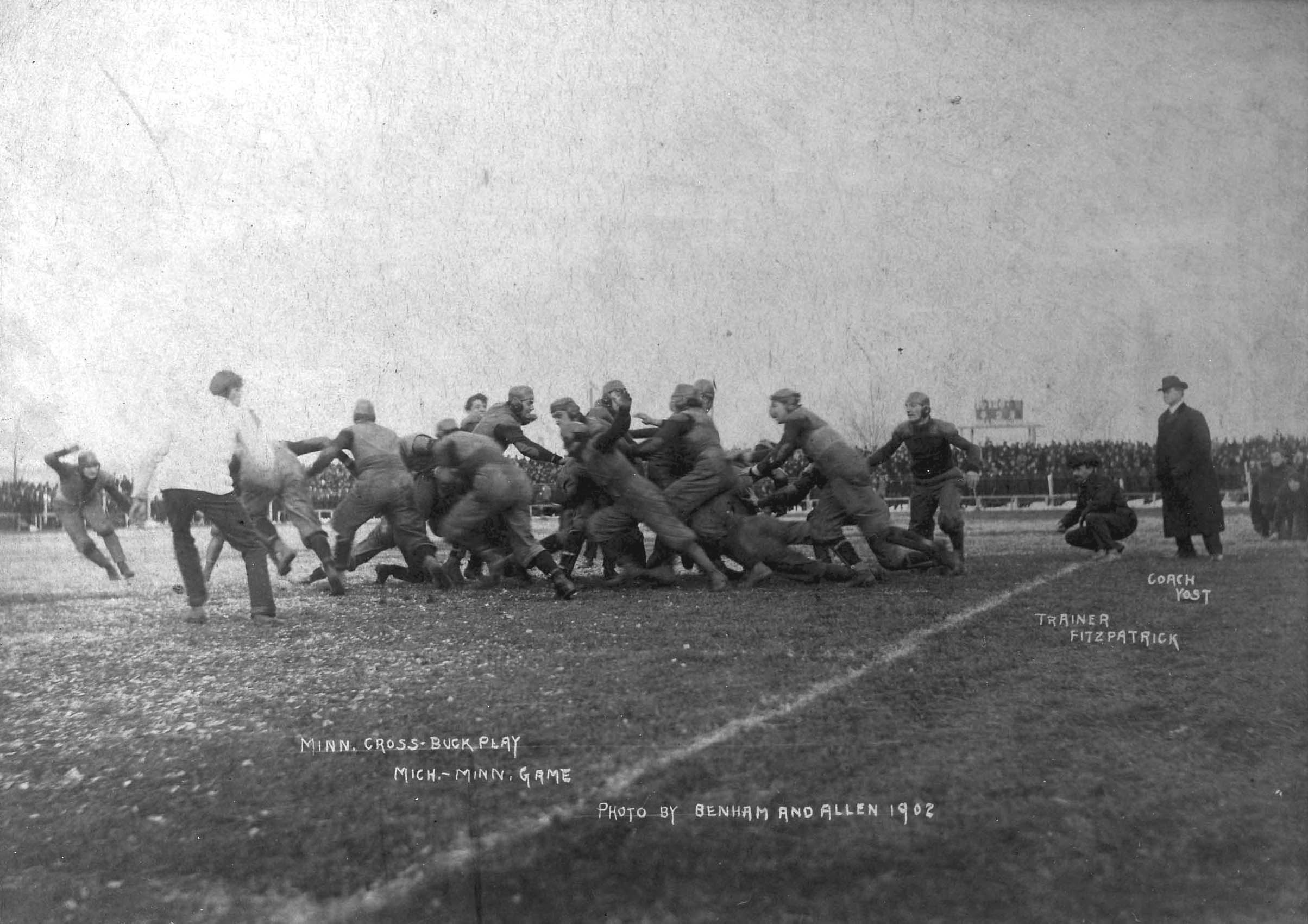
A 1902 football game between the University of Minnesota and the University of Michigan

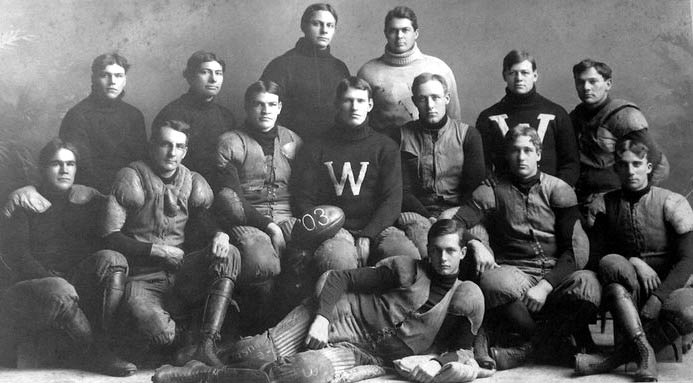
The University of Wisconsin football team in 1903

In 1879, the University of Michigan became the first school west of Pennsylvania to establish a college football team. On May 30, 1879, Michigan beat Racine College 1–0 in a game played in Chicago. The Chicago Daily Tribune called it "the first rugby-football game to be played west of the Alleghenies." Other Midwestern schools soon followed suit, including the University of Chicago, Northwestern University, and the University of Minnesota. The first western team to travel east was the 1881 Michigan team, which played at Harvard, Yale and Princeton. The nation's first college football league, the Intercollegiate Conference of Faculty Representatives (also known as the Western Conference), a precursor to the Big Ten Conference, was founded in 1895.

Led by coach Fielding H. Yost, Michigan became the first "western" national power. From 1901 to 1905, Michigan had a 56-game undefeated streak that included a 1902 trip to play in the first college football bowl game, which later became the Rose Bowl Game. During this streak, Michigan scored 2,831 points while allowing only 40.

Organized intercollegiate football was first played in the state of Minnesota on September 30, 1882, when Hamline was convinced to play Minnesota. Minnesota won 2 to 0. It was the first game west of the Mississippi River.

November 30, 1905, saw Chicago defeat Michigan 2 to 0. Dubbed "The First Greatest Game of the Century", it broke Michigan's 56-game unbeaten streak and marked the end of the "Point-a-Minute" years.

==== South ====
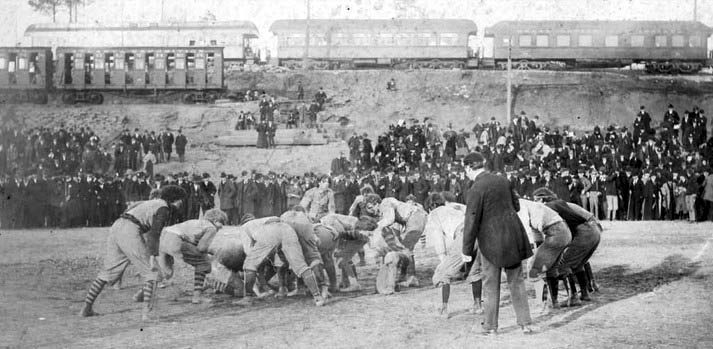
An 1895 football game between Auburn and Georgia

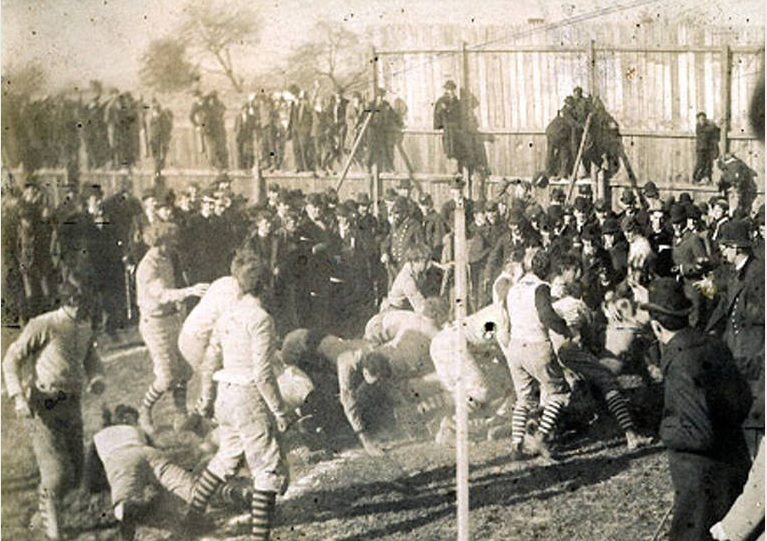
An 1894 football game in Staunton, Virginia between VMI and Virginia Tech

Organized collegiate football was first played in the state of Virginia and the south on November 2, 1873, in Lexington between Washington and Lee and VMI. Washington and Lee won 4–2. Some industrious students of the two schools organized a game for October 23, 1869, but it was rained out. Students of the University of Virginia were playing pickup games of the kicking-style of football as early as 1870, and some accounts even claim it organized a game against Washington and Lee College in 1871; but no record has been found of the score of this contest. Due to scantiness of records of the prior matches some will claim Virginia v. Pantops Academy November 13, 1887, as the first game in Virginia.

On April 9, 1880, at Stoll Field, Transylvania University (then called Kentucky University) beat Centre College by the score of 13 3/4–0 in what is often considered the first recorded game played in the South. The first game of "scientific football" in the South was the first instance of the Victory Bell rivalry between North Carolina and Duke (then known as Trinity College) held on Thanksgiving Day, 1888, at the North Carolina State Fairgrounds in Raleigh, North Carolina.

On November 13, 1887, the Virginia Cavaliers and Pantops Academy fought to a scoreless tie in the first organized football game in the state of Virginia. Students at UVA were playing pickup games of the kicking-style of football as early as 1870, and some accounts even claim that some industrious ones organized a game against Washington and Lee College in 1871, just two years after Rutgers and Princeton's historic first game in 1869. But no record has been found of the score of this contest. Washington and Lee also claims a 4 to 2 win over VMI in 1873.

On October 18, 1888, the Wake Forest Demon Deacons defeated the North Carolina Tar Heels 6 to 4 in the first intercollegiate game in the state of North Carolina.

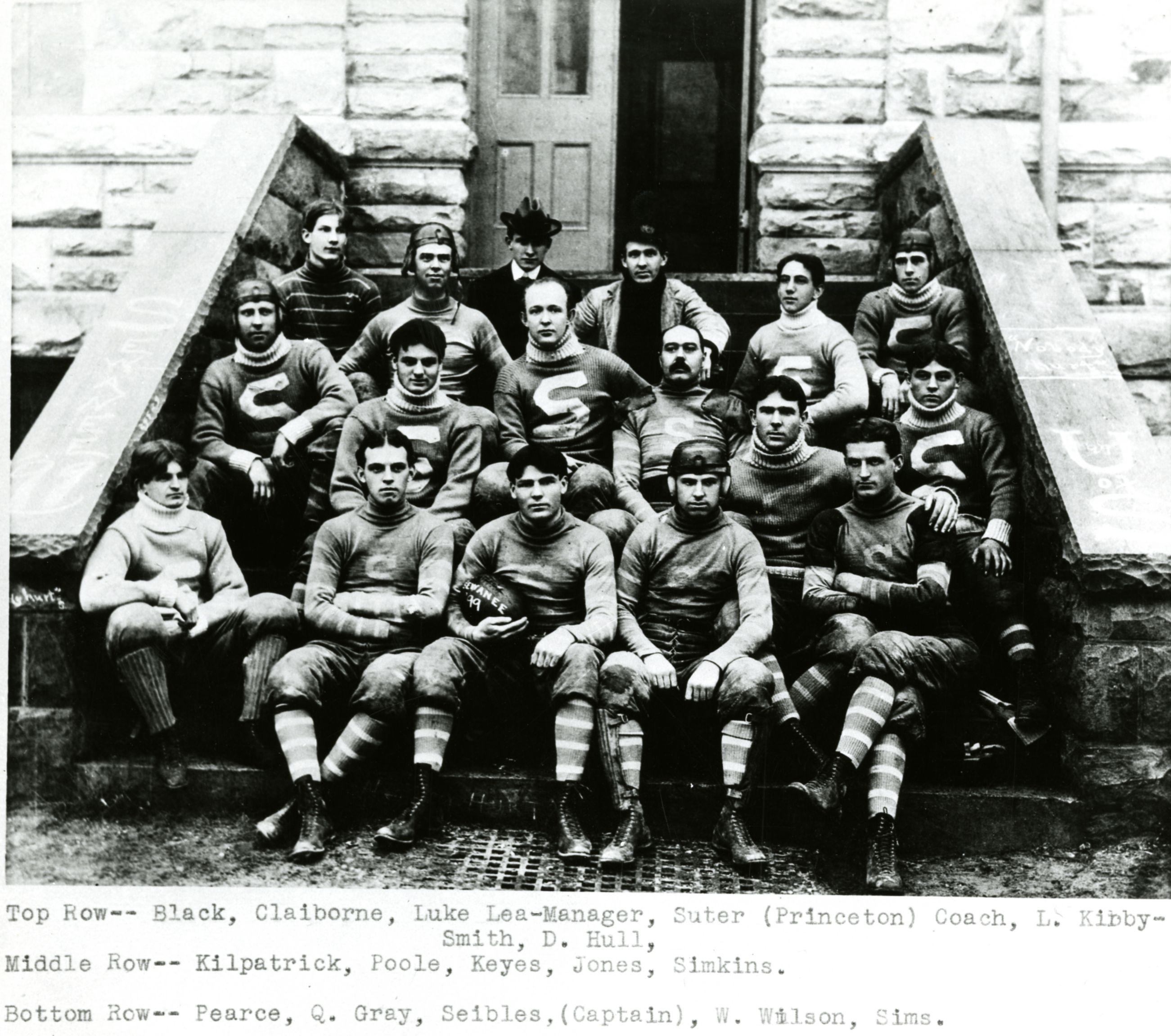
Sewanee's 1899 "Iron Men"

On December 14, 1889, Wofford defeated Furman 5 to 1 in the first intercollegiate game in the state of South Carolina. The game featured no uniforms, no positions, and the rules were formulated before the game.

January 30, 1892, saw the first football game played in the Deep South when the Georgia Bulldogs defeated Mercer 50–0 at Herty Field.

The beginnings of the contemporary Southeastern Conference and Atlantic Coast Conference start in 1894. The Southern Intercollegiate Athletic Association (SIAA) was founded on December 21, 1894, by William Dudley, a chemistry professor at Vanderbilt. The original members were Alabama, Auburn, Georgia, Georgia Tech, North Carolina, Sewanee, and Vanderbilt. Clemson, Cumberland, Kentucky, LSU, Mercer, Mississippi, Mississippi A&M (Mississippi State), Southwestern Presbyterian University, Tennessee, Texas, Tulane, and the University of Nashville joined the following year in 1895 as invited charter members. The conference was originally formed for "the development and purification of college athletics throughout the South".

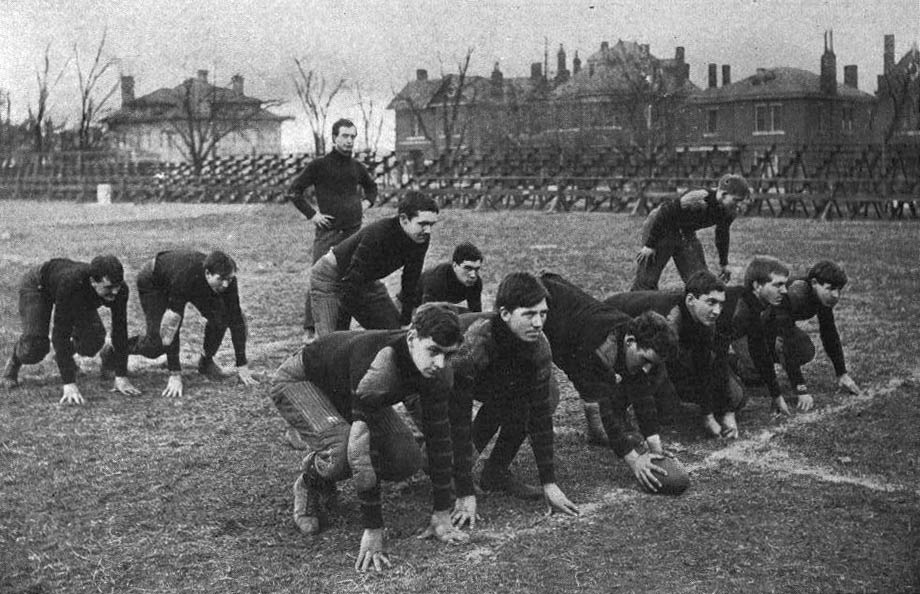
The 1904 Vanderbilt team in action; note the grid pattern on the field

The first forward pass in football likely occurred on October 26, 1895, in a game between Georgia and North Carolina when, out of desperation, the ball was thrown by the North Carolina back Joel Whitaker instead of punted and George Stephens caught the ball. On November 9, 1895, John Heisman executed a hidden ball trick using quarterback Reynolds Tichenor to get Auburn's only touchdown in a 6 to 9 loss to Vanderbilt. It was the first game in the south decided by a field goal. Heisman later used the trick against Pop Warner's Georgia team. Warner picked up the trick and later used it at Cornell against Penn State in 1897. He then used it in 1903 at Carlisle against Harvard and garnered national attention.

Organized intercollegiate football was first played in the state of Florida in 1901. A 7-game series between intramural teams from Stetson and Forbes occurred in 1894. The first intercollegiate game between official varsity teams was played on November 22, 1901. Stetson beat Florida Agricultural College at Lake City, one of the four forerunners of the University of Florida, 6–0, in a game played as part of the Jacksonville Fair.

On September 27, 1902, Georgetown beat Navy 4 to 0. It is claimed by Georgetown authorities as the game with the first ever "roving center" or linebacker when Percy Given stood up, in contrast to the usual tale of Germany Schulz. The first linebacker in the South is often considered to be Frank Juhan.

On Thanksgiving Day 1903, a game was scheduled in Montgomery, Alabama between the best teams from each region of the Southern Intercollegiate Athletic Association for an "SIAA championship game", pitting Cumberland against Heisman's Clemson. The game ended in an 11–11 tie causing many teams to claim the title. Heisman pressed hardest for Cumberland to get the claim of champion. It was his last game as Clemson head coach.

1904 saw big coaching hires in the south: Mike Donahue at Auburn, John Heisman at Georgia Tech, and Dan McGugin at Vanderbilt were all hired that year. Both Donahue and McGugin just came from the north that year, Donahue from Yale and McGugin from Michigan, and were among the initial inductees of the College Football Hall of Fame. The undefeated 1904 Vanderbilt team scored an average of 52.7 points per game, the most in college football that season, and allowed just four points.

==== Southwest ====
The first college football game in Oklahoma Territory occurred on November 7, 1895, when the "Oklahoma City Terrors" defeated the Oklahoma Sooners 34 to 0. The Terrors were a mix of Methodist college and high school students. The Sooners did not manage a single first down. By next season, Oklahoma coach John A. Harts had left to prospect for gold in the Arctic. Organized football was first played in the territory on November 29, 1894, between the Oklahoma City Terrors and Oklahoma City High School. The high school won 24 to 0.

==== Pacific Coast ====
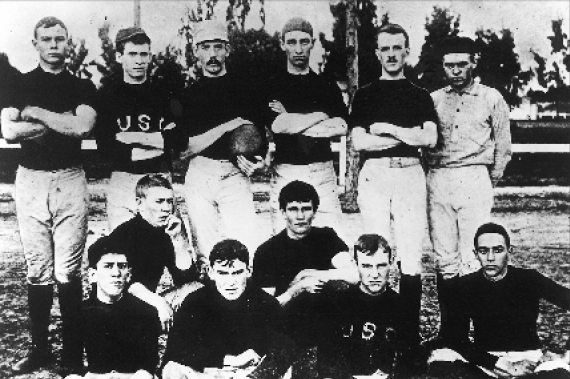
The first USC football team in 1888; before they were nicknamed the "Trojans", they were known as the USC Methodists.

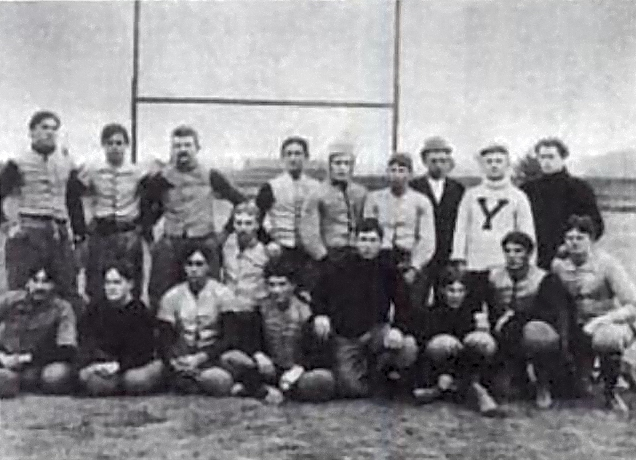
The 1893 Stanford University football team

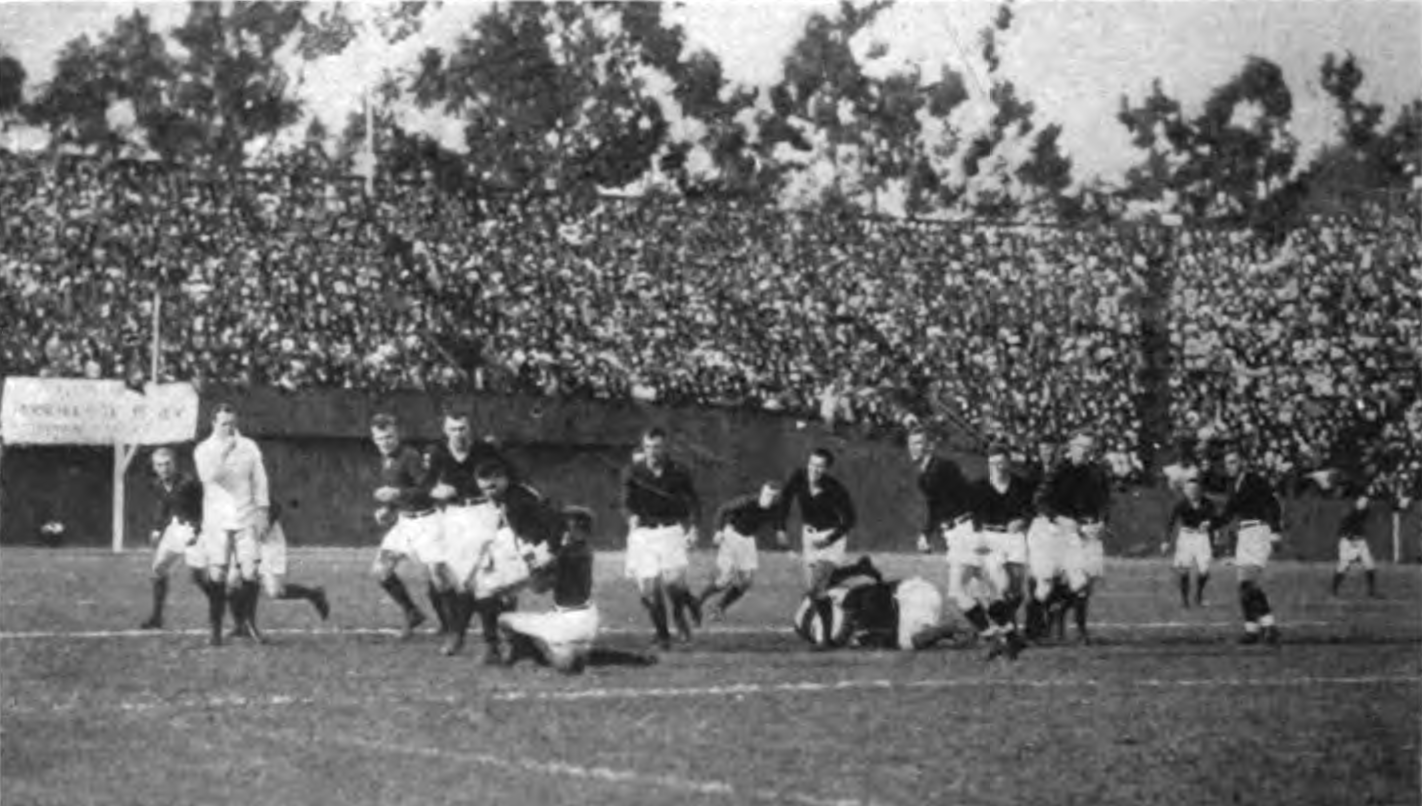
The Big Game between Stanford and Cal was played as rugby union from 1906 to 1914.

The University of Southern California first fielded an American football team in 1888. Playing its first game on November 14 of that year against the Alliance Athletic Club, in which USC gained a 16–0 victory. Frank Suffel and Henry H. Goddard were playing coaches for the first team which was put together by quarterback Arthur Carroll; who in turn volunteered to make the pants for the team and later became a tailor. USC faced its first collegiate opponent the following year in fall 1889, playing St. Vincent's College to a 40–0 victory. In 1893, USC joined the Intercollegiate Football Association of Southern California (the forerunner of the SCIAC), which was composed of USC, Occidental College, Throop Polytechnic Institute (Caltech), and Chaffey College. Pomona College was invited to enter, but declined to do so. An invitation was also extended to Los Angeles High School.

In 1891, the first Stanford football team was hastily organized and played a four-game season beginning in January 1892 with no official head coach. Following the season, Stanford captain John Whittemore wrote to Yale coach Walter Camp asking him to recommend a coach for Stanford. To Whittemore's surprise, Camp agreed to coach the team himself, on the condition that he finish the season at Yale first. As a result of Camp's late arrival, Stanford played just three official games, against San Francisco's Olympic Club and rival California. The team also played exhibition games against two Los Angeles area teams that Stanford does not include in official results. Camp returned to the East Coast following the season, then returned to coach Stanford in 1894 and 1895.

On December 25, 1894, Amos Alonzo Stagg's Chicago Maroons agreed to play Camp's Stanford football team in San Francisco in the first postseason intersectional contest, foreshadowing the modern bowl game. Future president Herbert Hoover was Stanford's student financial manager. Chicago won 24 to 4. Stanford won a rematch in Los Angeles on December 29 by 12 to 0.

The Big Game between Stanford and California is the oldest college football rivalry in the West. The first game was played on San Francisco's Haight Street Grounds on March 19, 1892, with Stanford winning 14–10. The term "Big Game" was first used in 1900, when it was played on Thanksgiving Day in San Francisco. During that game, a large group of men and boys, who were observing from the roof of the nearby S.F. and Pacific Glass Works, fell into the fiery interior of the building when the roof collapsed, resulting in 13 dead and 78 injured. On December 4, 1900, the last victim of the disaster (Fred Lilly) died, bringing the death toll to 22; and, to this day, the "Thanksgiving Day Disaster" remains the deadliest accident to kill spectators at a U.S. sporting event.

The University of Oregon began playing American football in 1894 and played its first game on March 24, 1894, defeating Albany College 44–3 under head coach Cal Young. Cal Young left after that first game and J.A. Church took over the coaching position in the fall for the rest of the season. Oregon finished the season with two additional losses and a tie, but went undefeated the following season, winning all four of its games under head coach Percy Benson. In 1899, the Oregon football team left the state for the first time, playing the California Golden Bears in Berkeley, California.

American football at Oregon State University started in 1893 shortly after athletics were initially authorized at the college. Athletics were banned at the school in May 1892, but when the strict school president, Benjamin Arnold, died, President John Bloss reversed the ban. Bloss's son William started the first team, on which he served as both coach and quarterback. The team's first game was an easy 63–0 defeat over the home team, Albany College.

In May 1900, Yost was hired as the football coach at Stanford University, and, after traveling home to West Virginia, he arrived in Palo Alto, California, on August 21, 1900. Yost led the 1900 Stanford team to a 7–2–1, outscoring opponents 154 to 20. The next year in 1901, Yost was hired by Charles A. Baird as the head football coach for the Michigan Wolverines football team. On January 1, 1902, Yost's dominating 1901 Michigan Wolverines football team agreed to play a 3–1–2 team from Stanford University in the inaugural "Tournament East-West football game" what is now known as the Rose Bowl Game by a score of 49–0 after Stanford captain Ralph Fisher requested to quit with eight minutes remaining.

The 1905 season marked the first meeting between Stanford and USC. Consequently, Stanford is USC's oldest existing rival. The Big Game between Stanford and Cal on November 11, 1905, was the first played at Stanford Field, with Stanford winning 12–5.

In 1906, citing concerns about the violence in American Football, universities on the West Coast, led by California and Stanford, replaced the sport with rugby union. At the time, the future of American football was very much in doubt and these schools believed that rugby union would eventually be adopted nationwide. Other schools followed suit and also made the switch included Nevada, St. Mary's, Santa Clara, and USC (in 1911). However, due to the perception that West Coast football was inferior to the game played on the East Coast anyway, East Coast and Midwest teams shrugged off the loss of the teams and continued playing American football. With no nationwide movement, the available pool of rugby teams to play remained small. The schools scheduled games against local club teams and reached out to rugby union powers in Australia, New Zealand, and especially, due to its proximity, Canada. The annual Big Game between Stanford and California continued as rugby, with the winner invited by the British Columbia Rugby Union to a tournament in Vancouver over the Christmas holidays, with the winner of that tournament receiving the Cooper Keith Trophy.

During 12 seasons of playing rugby union, Stanford was remarkably successful: the team had three undefeated seasons, three one-loss seasons, and an overall record of 94 wins, 20 losses, and 3 ties for a winning percentage of .816. However, after a few years, the school began to feel the isolation of its newly adopted sport, which was not spreading as many had hoped. Students and alumni began to clamor for a return to American football to allow wider intercollegiate competition. The pressure at rival California was stronger (especially as the school had not been as successful in the Big Game as they had hoped), and in 1915 California returned to American football. As reasons for the change, the school cited rule change back to American football, the overwhelming desire of students and supporters to play American football, interest in playing other East Coast and Midwest schools, and a patriotic desire to play an "American" game. California's return to American football increased the pressure on Stanford to also change back in order to maintain the rivalry. Stanford played its 1915, 1916, and 1917 "Big Games" as rugby union against Santa Clara and California's football "Big Game" in those years was against Washington, but both schools desired to restore the old traditions. The onset of American involvement in World War I gave Stanford an out: In 1918, the Stanford campus was designated as the Students' Army Training Corps headquarters for all of California, Nevada, and Utah, and the commanding officer Sam M. Parker decreed that American football was the appropriate athletic activity to train soldiers and rugby union was dropped.

==== Mountain West ====
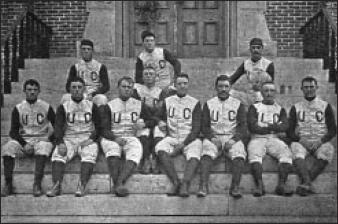
Colorado's first football team in 1890

The University of Colorado began playing American football in 1890. Colorado found much success in its early years, winning eight Colorado Football Association Championships (1894–97, 1901–08).

The following was taken from the Silver & Gold newspaper of December 16, 1898. It was a recollection of the birth of Colorado football written by one of CU's original gridders, John C. Nixon, also the school's second captain. It appears here in its original form:

At the beginning of the first semester in the fall of '90 the boys rooming at the dormitory on the campus of the U. of C. being afflicted with a super-abundance of penned up energy, or perhaps having recently drifted from under the parental wing and delighting in their newly found freedom, decided among other wild schemes, to form an athletic association. Messrs Carney, Whittaker, Layton and others, who at that time constituted a majority of the male population of the university, called a meeting of the campus boys in the old medical building. Nixon was elected president and Holden secretary of the association.

It was voted that the officers constitute a committee to provide uniform suits in which to play what was called "association football". Suits of flannel were ultimately procured and paid for assessments on the members of the association and generous contributions from members of the faculty. ...

The Athletic Association should now invigorate its base-ball and place it at par with its football team; and it certainly has the material with which to do it. The U of C should henceforth lead the state and possibly the west in athletic sports. ...

The style of football playing has altered considerably; by the old rules, all men in front of the runner with the ball, were offside, consequently we could not send backs through and break the line ahead of the ball as is done at present. The notorious V was then in vogue, which gave a heavy team too much advantage. The mass plays being now barred, skill on the football field is more in demand than mere weight and strength.

— John C. Nixon, Silver & Gold, December 16, 1898

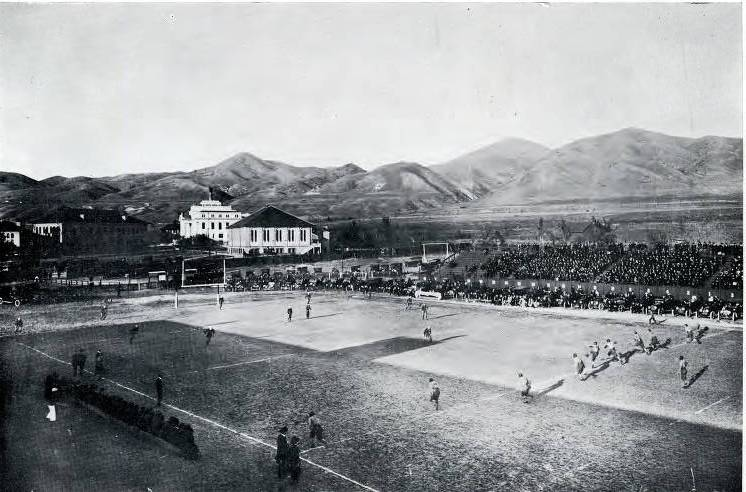
Kickoff during the 1916 Colorado – Utah game

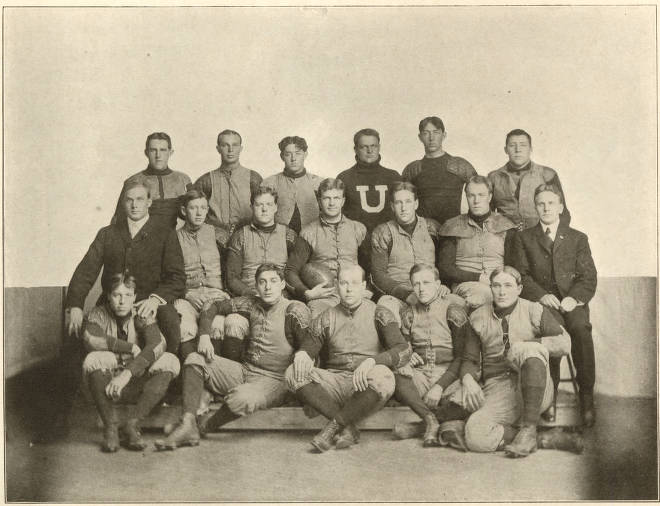
The 1905 Utah football team

In 1909, the Rocky Mountain Athletic Conference was founded, featuring four members: Colorado, Colorado College, Colorado School of Mines, and Colorado Agricultural College. The University of Denver and the University of Utah joined the RMAC in 1910. For its first thirty years, the RMAC was considered a major conference equivalent to today's Division I, before 7 larger members left and formed the Mountain States Conference (also called the Skyline Conference).

=== Violence, formation of NCAA ===
College football increased in popularity through the remainder of the 19th and early 20th century. It also became increasingly violent. Between 1890 and 1905, 330 college athletes died as a direct result of injuries sustained on the football field. These deaths could be attributed to the mass formations and gang tackling that characterized the sport in its early years.

No sport is wholesome in which ungenerous or mean acts which easily escape detection contribute to victory.

— Charles William Eliot, President of Harvard University (1869–1909) opposing football in 1905.

The 1894 Harvard–Yale game, known as the "Hampden Park Blood Bath", resulted in crippling injuries for four players; the contest was suspended until 1897. The annual Army–Navy game was suspended from 1894 to 1898 for similar reasons. One of the major problems was the popularity of mass-formations like the flying wedge, in which a large number of offensive players charged as a unit against a similarly arranged defense. The resultant collisions often led to serious injuries and sometimes even death. Georgia fullback Richard Von Albade Gammon notably died on the field from concussions received against Virginia in 1897, causing Georgia, Georgia Tech, and Mercer to suspend their football programs.

The situation came to a head in 1905 when there were 19 fatalities nationwide. President Theodore Roosevelt reportedly threatened to shut down the game if drastic changes were not made. However, the threat by Roosevelt to eliminate football is disputed by sports historians. What is absolutely certain is that on October 9, 1905, Roosevelt held a meeting of football representatives from Harvard, Yale, and Princeton. Though he lectured on eliminating and reducing injuries, he never threatened to ban football. He also lacked the authority to abolish football and was, in fact, actually a fan of the sport and wanted to preserve it. The President's sons were also playing football at the college and secondary levels at the time.

Meanwhile, John H. Outland held an experimental game in Wichita, Kansas that reduced the number of scrimmage plays to earn a first down from four to three in an attempt to reduce injuries. The Los Angeles Times reported an increase in punts and considered the game much safer than regular play but that the new rule was not "conducive to the sport". In 1906, President Roosevelt organized a meeting among thirteen school leaders at the White House to find solutions to make the sport safer for the athletes. Because the college officials could not agree upon a change in rules, it was decided over the course of several subsequent meetings that an external governing body should be responsible. Finally, on December 28, 1905, 62 schools met in New York City to discuss rule changes to make the game safer. As a result of this meeting, the Intercollegiate Athletic Association of the United States was formed in 1906. The IAAUS was the original rule-making body of college football, but would go on to sponsor championships in other sports. The IAAUS would get its current name of National Collegiate Athletic Association (NCAA) in 1910, and still sets rules governing the sport.

The rules committee considered widening the playing field to "open up" the game, but Harvard Stadium (the first large permanent football stadium) had recently been built at great expense; it would be rendered useless by a wider field. The rules committee legalized the forward pass instead. Though it was underused for years, this proved to be one of the most important rule changes in the establishment of the modern game. Another rule change banned "mass momentum" plays (many of which, like the infamous "flying wedge", were sometimes literally deadly).

=== Modernization and innovation (1906–1930) ===
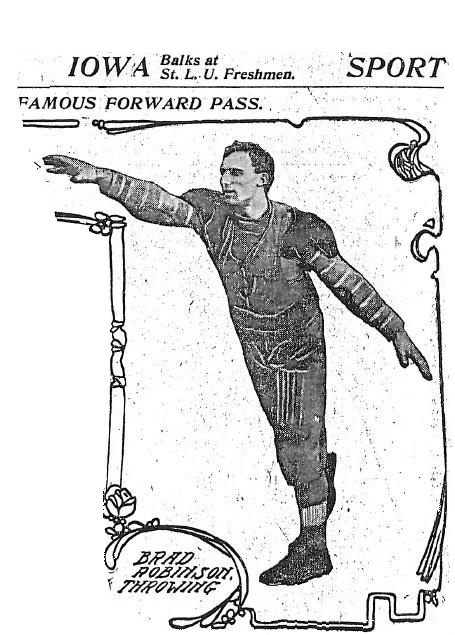
A 1906 St. Louis Post-Dispatch photograph of Brad Robinson, who threw the first legal forward pass and was the sport's first triple threat

As a result of the 1905–1906 reforms, mass formation plays became illegal and forward passes legal. Bradbury Robinson, playing for visionary coach Eddie Cochems at Saint Louis University, threw the first legal pass in a September 5, 1906, game against Carroll College at Waukesha. Other important changes, formally adopted in 1910, were the requirements that at least seven offensive players be on the line of scrimmage at the time of the snap, that there be no pushing or pulling, and that interlocking interference (arms linked or hands on belts and uniforms) was not allowed. These changes greatly reduced the potential for collision injuries. Several coaches emerged who took advantage of these sweeping changes. Amos Alonzo Stagg introduced such innovations as the huddle, the tackling dummy, and the pre-snap shift. Other coaches, such as Pop Warner and Knute Rockne, introduced new strategies that still remain part of the game.

Besides these coaching innovations, several rules changes during the first third of the 20th century had a profound impact on the game, mostly in opening up the passing game. In 1914, the first roughing-the-passer penalty was implemented. In 1918, the rules on eligible receivers were loosened to allow eligible players to catch the ball anywhere on the field—previously strict rules were in place allowing passes to only certain areas of the field. Scoring rules also changed during this time: field goals were lowered to three points in 1909 and touchdowns raised to six points in 1912.

Star players that emerged in the early 20th century include Jim Thorpe, Red Grange, and Bronko Nagurski; these three made the transition to the fledgling NFL and helped turn it into a successful league. Sportswriter Grantland Rice helped popularize the sport with his poetic descriptions of games and colorful nicknames for the game's biggest players, including Notre Dame's "Four Horsemen" backfield and Fordham University's linemen, known as the "Seven Blocks of Granite".

In 1907 at Champaign, Illinois Chicago and Illinois played in the first game to have a halftime show featuring a marching band. Chicago won 42–6. On November 25, 1911 Kansas played at Missouri in the first homecoming football game. The game was "broadcast" play-by-play over telegraph to at least 1,000 fans in Lawrence, Kansas. It ended in a 3–3 tie. The game between West Virginia and Pittsburgh on October 8, 1921, saw the first live radio broadcast of a college football game when Harold W. Arlin announced that year's Backyard Brawl played at Forbes Field on KDKA. Pitt won 21–13. On October 28, 1922, Princeton and Chicago played the first game to be nationally broadcast on radio. Princeton won 21–18 in a hotly contested game which had Princeton dubbed the "Team of Destiny".

==== Rise of the South ====
One publication claims "The first scouting done in the South was in 1905, when Dan McGugin and Captain Innis Brown, of Vanderbilt went to Atlanta to see Sewanee play Georgia Tech." Fuzzy Woodruff claims Davidson was the first in the south to throw a legal forward pass in 1906. The following season saw Vanderbilt execute a double pass play to set up the touchdown that beat Sewanee in a meeting of the unbeaten for the SIAA championship. Grantland Rice cited this event as the greatest thrill he ever witnessed in his years of watching sports. Vanderbilt coach Dan McGugin in Spalding's Football Guide's summation of the season in the SIAA wrote "The standing. First, Vanderbilt; second, Sewanee, a might good second;" and that Aubrey Lanier "came near winning the Vanderbilt game by his brilliant dashes after receiving punts." Bob Blake threw the final pass to center Stein Stone, catching it near the goal among defenders. Honus Craig then ran in the winning touchdown.

===== Heisman shift =====
Using the "jump shift" offense, John Heisman's Georgia Tech Golden Tornado won 222 to 0 over Cumberland on October 7, 1916, at Grant Field in the most lopsided victory in college football history. Tech went on a 33-game winning streak during this period. The 1917 team was the first national champion from the South, led by a powerful backfield. It also had the first two players from the Deep South selected first-team All-American in Walker Carpenter and Everett Strupper. Pop Warner's Pittsburgh Panthers were also undefeated, but declined a challenge by Heisman to a game. When Heisman left Tech after 1919, his shift was still employed by protégé William Alexander.

===== Notable intersectional games =====
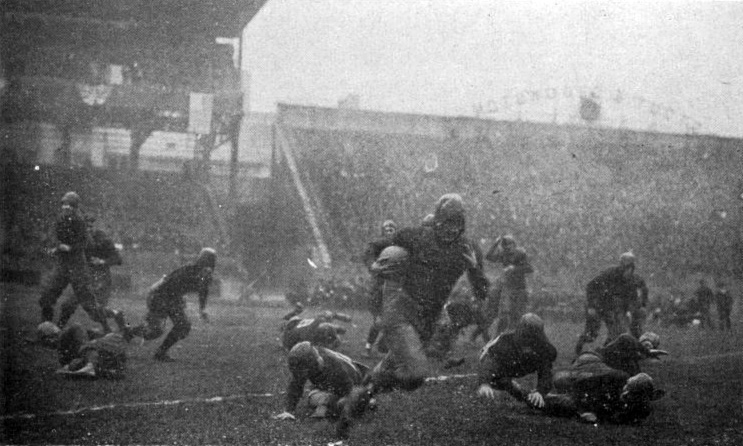
Tom Davies runs against undefeated and unscored upon Georgia Tech in the 1918 game at Forbes Field

In 1906, Vanderbilt defeated Carlisle 4 to 0, the result of a Bob Blake field goal. In 1907 Vanderbilt fought Navy to a 6 to 6 tie. In 1910 Vanderbilt held defending national champion Yale to a scoreless tie.

Helping Georgia Tech's claim to a title in 1917, the Auburn Tigers held undefeated, Chic Harley-led Big Ten champion Ohio State to a scoreless tie the week before Georgia Tech beat the Tigers 68 to 7. The next season, with many players gone due to World War I, a game was finally scheduled at Forbes Field with Pittsburgh. The Panthers, led by freshman Tom Davies, defeated Georgia Tech 32 to 0. Tech center Bum Day was the first player on a Southern team ever selected first-team All-American by Walter Camp.

1917 saw the rise of another Southern team in Centre of Danville, Kentucky. In 1921 Bo McMillin-led Centre upset defending national champion Harvard 6 to 0 in what is widely considered one of the greatest upsets in college football history. The next year Vanderbilt fought Michigan to a scoreless tie at the inaugural game at Dudley Field (now Vanderbilt Stadium), the first stadium in the South made exclusively for college football. Michigan coach Fielding Yost and Vanderbilt coach Dan McGugin were brothers-in-law, and the latter the protégé of the former. The game featured the season's two best defenses and included a goal line stand by Vanderbilt to preserve the tie. Its result was "a great surprise to the sporting world". Commodore fans celebrated by throwing some 3,000 seat cushions onto the field. The game features prominently in Vanderbilt's history. That same year, Alabama upset Penn 9 to 7.

Vanderbilt's line coach then was Wallace Wade, who coached Alabama to the South's first Rose Bowl victory in 1925. This game is commonly referred to as "the game that changed the south". Wade followed up the next season with an undefeated record and Rose Bowl tie. Georgia's 1927 "dream and wonder team" defeated Yale for the first time. Georgia Tech, led by Heisman protégé William Alexander, gave the dream and wonder team its only loss, and the next year were national and Rose Bowl champions. The Rose Bowl included Roy Riegels' wrong-way run. On October 12, 1929, Yale lost to Georgia in Sanford Stadium in its first trip to the south. Wade's Alabama again won a national championship and Rose Bowl in 1930.

==== Coaches of the era ====
===== Glenn "Pop" Warner =====
Glenn "Pop" Warner coached at several schools throughout his career, including the University of Georgia, Cornell University, University of Pittsburgh, Stanford University, Iowa State University, and Temple University. One of his most famous stints was at the Carlisle Indian Industrial School, where he coached Jim Thorpe, who went on to become the first president of the National Football League, an Olympic Gold Medalist, and is widely considered one of the best overall athletes in history. Warner wrote one of the first important books of football strategy, Football for Coaches and Players, published in 1927. Though the shift was invented by Stagg, Warner's single wing and double wing formations greatly improved upon it; for almost 40 years, these were among the most important formations in football. As part of his single and double wing formations, Warner was one of the first coaches to effectively use the forward pass. Among his other innovations are modern blocking schemes, the three-point stance, and the reverse play. The youth football league, Pop Warner Little Scholars, was named in his honor.

===== Knute Rockne =====
Knute Rockne rose to prominence in 1913 as an end for the University of Notre Dame, then a largely unknown Midwestern Catholic school. When Army scheduled Notre Dame as a warm-up game, they thought little of the small school. Rockne and quarterback Gus Dorais made innovative use of the forward pass, still at that point a relatively unused weapon, to defeat Army 35–13 and helped establish the school as a national power. Rockne returned to coach the team in 1918, and devised the powerful Notre Dame Box offense, based on Warner's single wing. He is credited with being the first major coach to emphasize offense over defense. Rockne is also credited with popularizing and perfecting the forward pass, a seldom used play at the time. The 1924 team featured the Four Horsemen backfield. In 1927, his complex shifts led directly to a rule change whereby all offensive players had to stop for a full second before the ball could be snapped. Rather than simply a regional team, Rockne's "Fighting Irish" became famous for barnstorming and played any team at any location. It was during Rockne's tenure that the annual Notre Dame-University of Southern California rivalry began. He led his team to an impressive 105–12–5 record before his premature death in a plane crash in 1931. He was so famous at that point that his funeral was broadcast nationally on radio.

=== From a regional to a national sport (1930–1958) ===
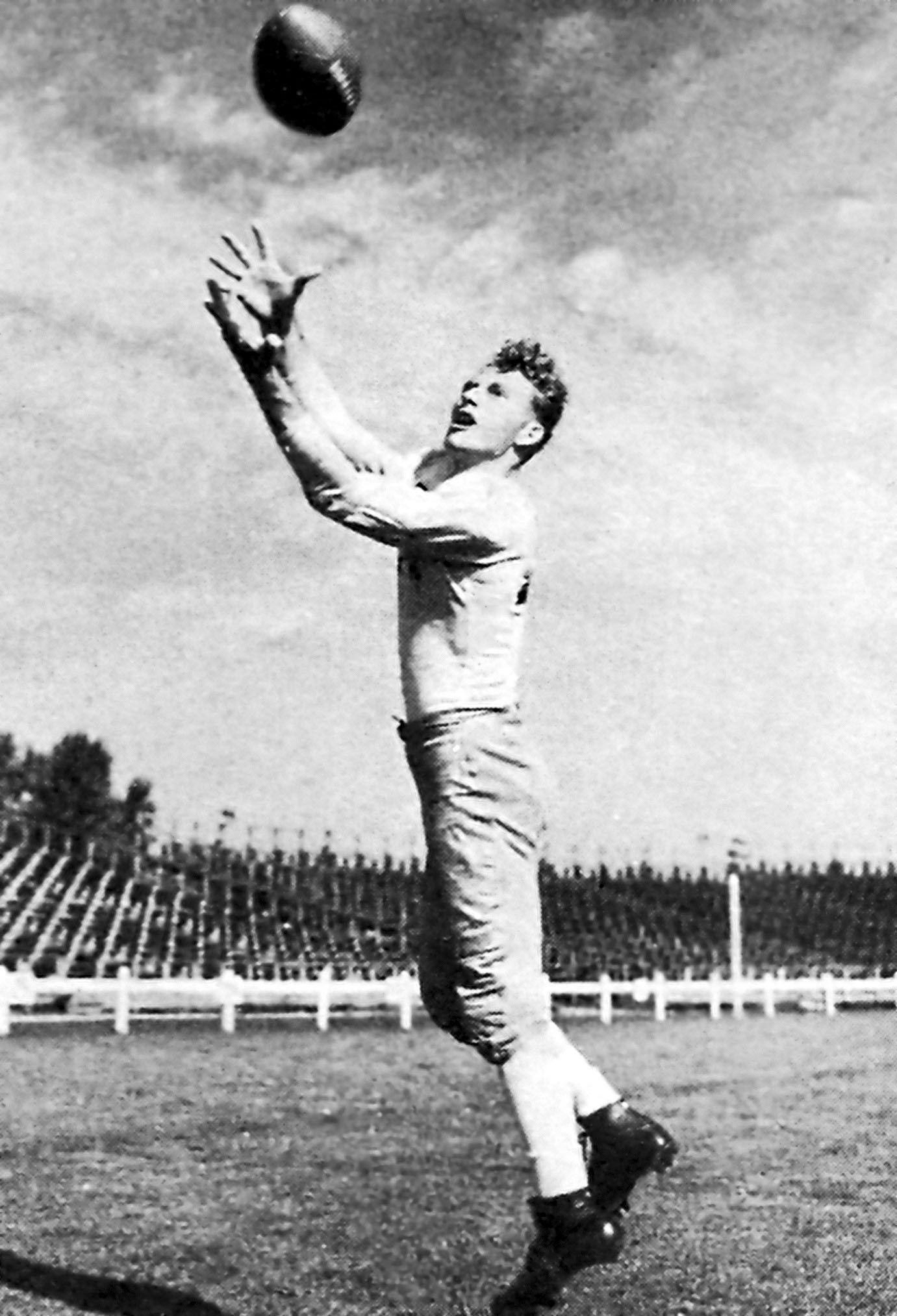
Don Hutson in 1940

In the early 1930s, the college game continued to grow, particularly in the South, bolstered by fierce rivalries such as the "South's Oldest Rivalry", between Virginia and North Carolina and the "Deep South's Oldest Rivalry", between Georgia and Auburn. Although before the mid-1920s most national powers came from the Northeast or the Midwest, the trend changed when several teams from the South and the West Coast achieved national success. Wallace William Wade's 1925 Alabama team won the 1926 Rose Bowl after receiving its first national title and William Alexander's 1928 Georgia Tech team defeated California in the 1929 Rose Bowl. College football quickly became the most popular spectator sport in the South.

Several major modern college football conferences rose to prominence during this time period. The Southwest Athletic Conference had been founded in 1915. Consisting mostly of schools from Texas, the conference saw back-to-back national champions with Texas Christian University (TCU) in 1938 and Texas A&M in 1939. The Pacific Coast Conference (PCC), a precursor to the Pac-12 Conference (Pac-12), had its own back-to-back champion in the University of Southern California which was awarded the title in 1931 and 1932. The Southeastern Conference (SEC) formed in 1932 and consisted mostly of schools in the Deep South. As in previous decades, the Big Ten continued to dominate in the 1930s and 1940s, with Minnesota winning 5 titles between 1934 and 1941, and Michigan (1933, 1947, and 1948) and Ohio State (1942) also winning titles.

As it grew beyond its regional affiliations in the 1930s, college football garnered increased national attention. Four new bowl games were created: the Orange Bowl, Sugar Bowl, the Sun Bowl in 1935, and the Cotton Bowl in 1937. In lieu of an actual national championship, these bowl games, along with the earlier Rose Bowl, provided a way to match up teams from distant regions of the country that did not otherwise play. In 1936, the Associated Press (AP) began its weekly poll of prominent sports writers, ranking all of the nation's college football teams. Since there was no national championship game, the final version of the AP poll was used to determine who was crowned the National Champion of college football.

The 1930s saw growth in the passing game. Though some coaches, such as General Robert Neyland at Tennessee, continued to eschew its use, several rules changes to the game had a profound effect on teams' ability to throw the ball. In 1934, the rules committee removed two major penalties—a loss of five yards for a second incomplete pass in any series of downs and a loss of possession for an incomplete pass in the end zone—and shrunk the circumference of the ball, making it easier to grip and throw. Players who became famous for taking advantage of the easier passing game included Alabama end Don Hutson and TCU passer "Slingin" Sammy Baugh.

In 1935, New York City's Downtown Athletic Club awarded the first Heisman Trophy to University of Chicago halfback Jay Berwanger, who was also the first ever NFL draft pick in 1936. The trophy was designed by sculptor Frank Eliscu and modeled after New York University player Ed Smith. The trophy recognizes the nation's "most outstanding" college football player and has become one of the most coveted awards in all of American sports.

During World War II, college football players enlisted in the armed forces, some playing in Europe during the war. As most of these players had eligibility left on their college careers, some of them returned to college at West Point, bringing Army back-to-back national titles in 1944 and 1945 under coach Red Blaik. Doc Blanchard (known as "Mr. Inside") and Glenn Davis (known as "Mr. Outside") both won the Heisman Trophy, in 1945 and 1946. On the coaching staff of those 1944–1946 Army teams was future Pro Football Hall of Fame coach Vince Lombardi.

The 1950s saw the rise of yet more dynasties and power programs. Oklahoma, under coach Bud Wilkinson, won three national titles (1950, 1955, 1956) and all ten Big Eight Conference championships in the decade while building a record 47-game winning streak. Woody Hayes led Ohio State to two national titles, in 1954 and 1957, and won three Big Ten titles. The Michigan State Spartans were known as the "football factory" during the 1950s, where coaches Biggie Munn and Duffy Daugherty led the Spartans to two national titles and two Big Ten titles after joining the Big Ten athletically in 1953. Wilkinson and Hayes, along with Robert Neyland of Tennessee, oversaw a revival of the running game in the 1950s. Passing numbers dropped from an average of 18.9 attempts in 1951 to 13.6 attempts in 1955, while teams averaged just shy of 50 running plays per game. Nine out of ten Heisman Trophy winners in the 1950s were runners. Notre Dame, one of the biggest passing teams of the decade, saw a substantial decline in success; the 1950s were the only decade between 1920 and 1990 when the team did not win at least a share of the national title. Paul Hornung, Notre Dame quarterback, did, however, win the Heisman in 1956, becoming the only player from a losing team ever to do so.

The 1956 Sugar Bowl also gained international attention when Georgia's pro-segregationist Gov. Griffin publicly threatened Georgia Tech and its President Blake Van Leer over allowing the first African American player to play in a collegiate bowl game in the south.

=== Modern college football (since 1958) ===
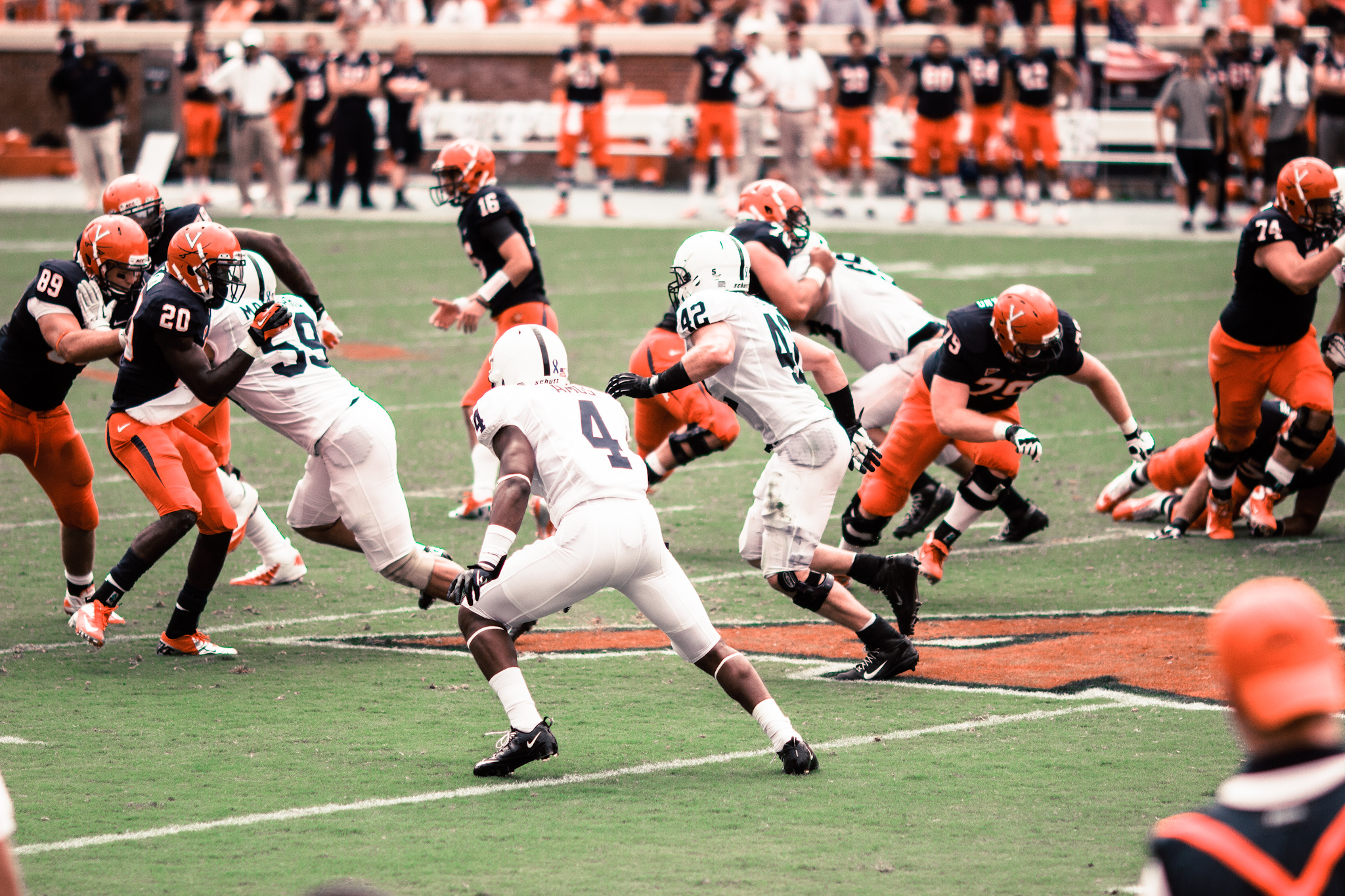
The Virginia Cavaliers (orange and blue home uniforms) playing Penn State Nittany Lions (all-white away uniforms) in 2012 at Scott Stadium

Following the enormous success of the 1958 NFL Championship Game, college football no longer enjoyed the same popularity as the NFL, at least on a national level. While both games benefited from the advent of television, since the late 1950s, the NFL has become a nationally popular sport while college football has maintained strong regional ties.

As professional football became a national television phenomenon, college football did as well. In the 1950s, Notre Dame, which had a large national following, formed its own network to broadcast its games, but by and large the sport still retained a mostly regional following. In 1952, the NCAA claimed all television broadcasting rights for the games of its member institutions, and it alone negotiated television rights. This situation continued until 1984, when several schools brought a suit under the Sherman Antitrust Act; the Supreme Court ruled against the NCAA and schools are now free to negotiate their own television deals. ABC Sports began broadcasting a national Game of the Week in 1966, bringing key matchups and rivalries to a national audience for the first time.

New formations and play sets continued to be developed. Emory Bellard, an assistant coach under Darrell Royal at the University of Texas, developed a three-back option style offense known as the wishbone. The wishbone is a run-heavy offense that depends on the quarterback making last second decisions on when and to whom to hand or pitch the ball to. Royal went on to teach the offense to other coaches, including Bear Bryant at Alabama, Chuck Fairbanks at Oklahoma and Pepper Rodgers at UCLA; who all adapted and developed it to their own tastes. The strategic opposite of the wishbone is the spread offense, developed by professional and college coaches throughout the 1960s and 1970s. Though some schools play a run-based version of the spread, its most common use is as a passing offense designed to "spread" the field both horizontally and vertically. Some teams have managed to adapt with the times to keep winning consistently. In the rankings of the most victorious programs, Michigan, Ohio State, and Alabama ranked first, second, and third in total wins.

==== Growth of bowl games ====
Growth of bowl games 1930–2022
Year	# of games
1930	1
1940	5
1950	8
1960	8
1970	8
1980	15
1990	19
2000	25
2010	35
2022	42 (Plus CFP national championship game)

In 1940, for the highest level of college football, there were only five bowl games (Rose, Orange, Sugar, Sun, and Cotton). By 1950, three more had joined that number and in 1970, there were still only eight major college bowl games. The number grew to eleven in 1976. At the birth of cable television and cable sports networks like ESPN, there were fifteen bowls in 1980. With more national venues and increased available revenue, the bowls saw an explosive growth throughout the 1980s and 1990s. In the thirty years from 1950 to 1980, seven bowl games were added to the schedule. From 1980 to 2008, an additional 20 bowl games were added to the schedule. Some have criticized this growth, claiming that the increased number of games has diluted the significance of playing in a bowl game. Yet others have countered that the increased number of games has increased exposure and revenue for a greater number of schools, and see it as a positive development. Teams participating in bowl games also get to practice up to four hours per day or 20 hours per week until their bowl game concludes. There is no limit on the number of practices during the bowl season, so teams that play later in the season (usually ones with more wins) get more opportunity to practice than ones that play earlier. This bowl practice period can be compared to the spring practice schedule when teams can have 15 on-field practice sessions. Many teams that play late in the bowl season use the first few practices for evaluation and development of younger players while resting the starters.

== Organization ==
College teams mostly play other similarly sized schools through the NCAA's divisional system. Division I generally consists of the major collegiate athletic powers with larger budgets, more elaborate facilities, and (with the exception of a few conferences such as the Pioneer Football League) more athletic scholarships. However, the size of the Division I schools can vary widely. With the introduction of NIL (players can be directly paid by universities for their name, image and likeness), this widens the gap between the Power 4 conferences — the Southeastern Conference (SEC), Big 10 (B1G), Big 12, and Atlantic Coast Conference (ACC) – and the Group of 6 teams in the American Conference, Conference USA (CUSA), Mid-American Conference (MAC), Mountain West Conference (MW), Pac-12 Conference, and Sun Belt Conference (SBC). The NIL collective from fans/alumni is significantly larger in the bigger conferences because of revenue sharing. In the larger conferences Revenue Sharing will add an average of 15,394,899 million dollars per team, and the larger Power 4 conference teams will add an average of 20.5 million dollars. This only widens the gap between the big and small conferences, making it nearly impossible to win a National Championship as a smaller Division I school.

=== Divisions II and III ===
Division II primarily consists of smaller public and private institutions that offer fewer scholarships and no Revenue Sharing unlike Division I. Division III institutions also field teams, but do not offer any scholarships tied directly to athletics. However, these teams usually give academic scholarships to aid student athletes.

Football teams in Division I are further divided into the Bowl Subdivision (consisting of the largest programs) and the Championship Subdivision. The Bowl Subdivision has historically not used an organized tournament to determine its champion, and instead teams compete in post-season bowl games. That changed with the debut of the four-team College Football Playoff at the end of the 2014 season, However, the NCAA does not operate that tournament, and its winner is not automatically crowned National Champion.

Teams in each of these four divisions are further divided into various regional conferences.

Several organizations operate college football programs outside the jurisdiction of the NCAA:

- The National Association of Intercollegiate Athletics has jurisdiction over more than 80 college football teams, mostly in the Midwest.
- The National Junior College Athletic Association has jurisdiction over two-year institutions, except in California, Oregon, and Washington. (The latter two states, neither of which has a junior college that sponsors football, are governed by the non-football Northwest Athletic Conference.)
- The California Community College Athletic Association governs sports, including football, at that state's two-year institutions. CCCAA members compete for their own championships and do not participate in the NJCAA.
- Club football, a sport in which student clubs run the teams instead of the colleges themselves, is overseen by two organizations: the National Club Football Association and the Intercollegiate Club Football Federation. The two competing sanctioning bodies have some overlap, and several clubs are members of both organizations.
- As of the current 2026 season, 15 schools play sprint football, played under standard NCAA rules but with a requirement that all players must weigh less than the average college student (that threshold is set, as of 2026, at 178 pounds (81 kg), with the added requirement of a minimum body fat content of 5%). Ten schools, all in the northeastern quadrant of the U.S., play in the Collegiate Sprint Football League, which has operated since 1934. The Midwest Sprint Football League started play in 2022 with six members, all in the Midwest and Upper South. Since then, it has had as many as eight members, but has only five in 2026.

A college that fields a team in the NCAA is not restricted from fielding teams in club or sprint football, and several colleges field two teams, a varsity (NCAA) squad and a club or sprint squad (no schools, as of 2026, field both club and sprint teams at the same time).

== Official rules and notable rule distinctions ==
Although rules for the high school, college, and NFL games are generally consistent, there are several minor differences. Before 2023, a single NCAA Football Rules Committee determined the playing rules for Division I (both Bowl and Championship Subdivisions), II, and III games (the National Association of Intercollegiate Athletics (NAIA) is a separate organization, but uses the NCAA rules). As part of an NCAA initiative to give each division more autonomy over its governance, separate rules committees have been established for each NCAA division.

- A pass is ruled complete if one of the receiver's feet is inbounds at the time of the catch. In the NFL both feet must be inbounds.
- A player is considered down when any part of his body other than the feet or hands touches the ground or when the ball carrier is tackled or otherwise falls and loses possession of the ball as he contacts the ground with any part of his body, with the sole exception of the holder for field goal and extra point attempts. In the NFL a player is active until he is tackled or forced down by a member of the opposing team (down by contact).
- Before the 2023 season, the clock stopped after the offense completed a first down and began again—assuming it is following a play in which the clock would not normally stop—once the referee declared the ball ready for play. Since 2023, this has only been the case in the last two minutes of a half in NCAA Divisions I and II; Division III adopted this rule in 2024. In the NFL the clock does not explicitly stop for a first down.
- Overtime was introduced in 1996, eliminating most ties except in the regular season. Since 2021, during each of the first two overtime periods, each team is given one possession from its opponent's 25-yard line with no game clock. The play clock remains in use, and each team is allowed one timeout per period. Any team that scores a touchdown in either of the first two overtimes must attempt a two-point conversion. Beginning with the third overtime, each team takes possession at the opponent's 3-yard line and can only score by conversion. A coin toss determines which team will have possession first at the start of each overtime period. Play continues until one team leads the other at the end of a period. [In the NFL overtime is decided by a modified sudden-death period of 10 minutes in regular-season games (no overtime in preseason up to 1973 & since 2021) and 15 minutes in playoff games, and regular-season games can still end in a tie if neither team scores. Overtime for regular-season games in the NFL began with the 1974 season; the overtime period for all games was 15 minutes until it was shortened for non-playoff games effective in 2017. In the postseason, if the teams are still tied, teams will play multiple overtime periods until either team scores.]
  - A tie game is still possible, per NCAA Rule 3–3–3 (c) and (d). If a game is suspended because of inclement weather while tied, typically in the second half or at the end of regulation, and the game is unable to be continued, the game ends in a tie. Similar to baseball, if one team has scored in its possession and the other team has not completed its possession, the score during the overtime can be wiped out and the game ruled a tie. Some conferences may enforce a curfew for the safety of the players. If, because of numerous overtimes or weather, the game reaches the time-certain finish imposed by the curfew tied, the game is ruled a tie.
- Extra point tries are attempted from the three-yard line. Kicked tries count as one point. Teams can also go for "the two-point conversion" which is when a team will line up at the three-yard line and try to score. If they are successful, they receive two points, if they are not, then they receive zero points. Starting with the 2015 season, the NFL uses the 15-yard line as the line of scrimmage for placekick attempts, but the two-yard line for two-point attempts. The two-point conversion was not implemented in the NFL until 1994, but it had been previously used in the old American Football League (AFL) before it merged with the NFL in 1970.
- The defensive team may score two points on a point-after touchdown attempt by returning a blocked kick, fumble, or interception into the opposition's end zone. In addition, if the defensive team gains possession, but then moves backward into the end zone and is stopped, a one-point safety will be awarded to the offense, although, unlike a real safety, the offense kicks off, opposed to the team charged with the safety. This college rule was added in 1988. The NFL, which previously treated the ball as dead during a conversion attempt—meaning that the attempt ended when the defending team gained possession of the football—adopted the college rule in 2015.
- Through 2023, the two-minute warning was not used in college football, except in rare cases where the scoreboard clock has malfunctioned and is not being used. The NCAA adopted the two-minute warning (under the name "two-minute timeout") in 2024.
- There is an option to use instant replay review of officiating decisions. Division I FBS schools use replay in virtually all games; replay is rarely used in lower division games. Every play is subject to booth review with coaches only having one challenge. In the NFL, only scoring plays, turnovers, the final 2:00 of each half and all overtime periods are reviewed, and coaches are issued two challenges (with the option for a third if one of the two challenges was successful).
- Since the 2012 season, the ball is placed on the 25-yard line following a touchback on either a kickoff or a free kick following a safety. The NFL adopted this rule in 2018. In all other touchback situations at all levels of the game, the ball is placed on the 20.
- Among other rule changes in 2007, kickoffs were moved from the 35-yard line back five yards to the 30-yard line, matching a change that the NFL had made in 1994. Some coaches and officials questioned this rule change as it could lead to more injuries to the players as there will likely be more kickoff returns. The rationale for the rule change was to help reduce dead time in the game. The NFL returned its kickoff location to the 35-yard line effective in 2011; college football did not do so until 2012.
- Several changes were made to college rules in 2011, all of which differ from NFL practice:
  - If a player is penalized for unsportsmanlike conduct for actions that occurred during a play ending in a touchdown by that team, but before the goal line was crossed, the touchdown will be nullified. In the NFL, the same foul would result in a penalty on the conversion attempt or ensuing kickoff, at the option of the non-penalized team.
  - If a team is penalized in the final minute of a half and the penalty causes the clock to stop, the opposing team now has the right to have 10 seconds run off the clock in addition to the yardage penalty. The NFL has a similar rule in the final minute of the half, but it applies only to specified violations against the offensive team. The new NCAA rule applies to penalties on both sides of the ball.
  - Players lined up outside the tackle box—more specifically, those lined up more than 7 yards from the center—will now be allowed to block below the waist only if they are blocking straight ahead or toward the nearest sideline.
  - On placekicks, each offensive lineman can be engaged by no more than two defensive players. The defenders risk a 5-yard penalty upon violation.
- In 2018, the NCAA made a further change to touchback rules that the NFL adopted in 2023; a fair catch on a kickoff or a free kick following a safety that takes place between the receiving team's goal line and 25-yard lines is treated as a touchback, with the ball placed at the 25.
- Yards lost on quarterback sacks are included in individual rushing yardage under NCAA rules. In the NFL, yards lost on sacks are included in team passing yardage, but are not included in individual passing statistics.

== Determination of a national champion ==
Currently, the NCAA Division I football teams are divided into two divisions – the "football bowl subdivision" (FBS) and the "football championship subdivision" (FCS). As indicated by the name, FBS teams are eligible to play in post-season bowls. The FCS teams, Division II, Division III, National Junior College teams play in sanctioned tournaments to determine their annual champions. There is not now, and never has been, an NCAA-sanctioned tournament to determine the champion of the top-level football teams.

With the growth of bowl games, it became difficult to determine a national champion in a fair and equitable manner. As conferences became contractually bound to certain bowl games (a situation known as a tie-in), match-ups that guaranteed a consensus national champion became increasingly rare.

=== Bowl Coalition ===
In 1992, seven conferences and independent Notre Dame formed the Bowl Coalition, which attempted to arrange an annual No. 1 versus No. 2 matchup based on the final AP poll standings. The Coalition lasted for three years; however, several scheduling issues prevented much success; tie-ins still took precedence in several cases. For example, the Big Eight and SEC champions could never meet, since they were contractually bound to different bowl games. The coalition also excluded the Rose Bowl, arguably the most prestigious game in the nation, and two major conferences—the Pac-10 and Big Ten—meaning that it had limited success.

=== Bowl Alliance ===
In 1995, the Coalition was replaced by the Bowl Alliance, which reduced the number of bowl games to host a national championship game to three—the Fiesta, Sugar, and Orange Bowls—and the participating conferences to five—the ACC, SEC, Southwest, Big Eight, and Big East. It was agreed that the No.1 and No.2 ranked teams gave up their prior bowl tie-ins and were guaranteed to meet in the national championship game, which rotated between the three participating bowls. The system still did not include the Big Ten, Pac-10, or the Rose Bowl, and thus still lacked the legitimacy of a true national championship. However, one positive side effect is that if there were three teams at the end of the season vying for a national title, but one of them was a Pac-10/Big Ten team bound to the Rose Bowl, then there would be no difficulty in deciding which teams to place in the Bowl Alliance "national championship" bowl; if the Pac-10 / Big Ten team won the Rose Bowl and finished with the same record as whichever team won the other bowl game, they could have a share of the national title. This happened in the final year of the Bowl Alliance, with Michigan winning the 1998 Rose Bowl and Nebraska winning the 1998 Orange Bowl. Without the Pac-10/Big Ten team bound to a bowl game, it would be difficult to decide which two teams should play for the national title.

=== Bowl Championship Series ===
In 1998, a new system was put into place called the Bowl Championship Series. For the first time, it included all major conferences (ACC, Big East, Big 12, Big Ten, Pac-10, and SEC) and four major bowl games (Rose, Orange, Sugar and Fiesta). The champions of these six conferences, along with two "at-large" selections, were invited to play in the four bowl games. Each year, one of the four bowl games served as a national championship game. Also, a complex system of human polls, computer rankings, and strength of schedule calculations was instituted to rank schools. Based on this ranking system, the No.1 and No.2 teams met each year in the national championship game. Traditional tie-ins were maintained for schools and bowls not part of the national championship. For example, in years when not a part of the national championship, the Rose Bowl still hosted the Big Ten and Pac-10 champions.

The system continued to change, as the formula for ranking teams was tweaked from year to year. At-large teams could be chosen from any of the Division I-A conferences, though only one selection—Utah in 2005—came from a BCS non-AQ conference. Starting with the 2006 season, a fifth game—simply called the BCS National Championship Game—was added to the schedule, to be played at the site of one of the four BCS bowl games on a rotating basis, one week after the regular bowl game. This opened up the BCS to two additional at-large teams. Also, rules were changed to add the champions of five additional conferences (Conference USA [C-USA], the Mid-American Conference [MAC], the Mountain West Conference [MW], the Sun Belt Conference and the Western Athletic Conference [WAC]), provided that said champion ranked in the top twelve in the final BCS rankings, or was within the top 16 of the BCS rankings and ranked higher than the champion of at least one of the BCS Automatic Qualifying (AQ) conferences. Several times since this rule change was implemented, schools from non-AQ conferences have played in BCS bowl games. In 2009, Boise State played TCU in the Fiesta Bowl, the first time two schools from non-AQ conferences played each other in a BCS bowl game. The last team from the non-AQ ranks to reach a BCS bowl game in the BCS era was Northern Illinois in 2012, which played in (and lost) the 2013 Orange Bowl.

=== College Football Playoff ===
The longtime resistance to a playoff system at the FBS level finally ended with the creation of the College Football Playoff (CFP) beginning with the 2014 season. The CFP is a multi-team single-elimination tournament (originally four teams; expanded to 12 teams in the 2024 season) whose participants are chosen and seeded by a selection committee. Originally, the semifinals were hosted by two of the group of traditional bowl games known as the New Year's Six, with hosts rotating in a three-year cycle. In the current format, the first round is held at campus sites, with the quarterfinals and semifinals hosted by New Year's Six bowls. In both formats, semifinal winners advance to the College Football Playoff National Championship, whose host is determined by open bidding several years in advance.

The 10 FBS conferences are formally and popularly divided into two groups:

- Power Four – Four of the six AQ conferences of the BCS era, specifically the ACC, Big Ten, Big 12, and SEC. It was formerly known as the Power Six, including the Big East and Pac-12 until the end of Big East football in 2013 and the collapse of the Pac-12 in 2024. During the CFP's four-team era, each champion of these conferences was assured of a spot in a New Year's Six bowl, though not necessarily in a semi-final game. Notre Dame remains a football independent, but is counted among the Power Four because of its full but non-football ACC membership, including a football scheduling alliance with that conference. In the 2020 season, Notre Dame played as a full-time member of the conference due to the effects that COVID-19 had on the college football season, causing many conferences to play conference-only regular seasons. Before the 2024 CFP expansion, Notre Dame had its own arrangement for access to the New Year's Six games if it met certain standards.
- Group of Six – The six remaining FBS conferences: American, CUSA, MAC, MW, Pac-12, and Sun Belt. It was formerly known as the Group of Five until the Pac-12 became considered part of this group after its collapse. The other current FBS independent, UConn, is also considered to be part of this group. During the four-team CFP era, one conference champion from this group received a spot in a New Year's Six game. In the first two seasons of the current 12-team era, the top conference champion from this group received an automatic CFP berth. Starting in 2026, the top Group of Six team in the CFP rankings receives an automatic berth even if it fails to win a conference title. In the first seven seasons of the CFP, the Group of Five did not place a team in a semifinal. In 2021, Cincinnati, then a member of the American, qualified for the Playoff, becoming the first Group of 5 team to qualify (and only such team to do so in the four-team era). In the first season of the 12-team CFP in 2024, Boise State received a first-round bye into the New Year's Six. Of the 10 Group of Five teams selected for New Year's Six bowls, four have won their games.

== National championships ==
- College football national championships in NCAA Division I FBS – Overview of systems for determining national champions at the highest level of college football from 1869 to present.
  - College Football Playoff – Four-team playoff for determining national champions at the highest level of college football beginning in 2014. After a vote by the College Football Playoff's Board of Managers, the Playoff was expanded to 12 teams in 2024.
  - Bowl Championship Series – The primary method of determining the national champion at the highest level of college football from 1998 to 2013; preceded by the Bowl Alliance (1995–1997) and the Bowl Coalition (1992–1994).
- NCAA Division I Football Championship – Playoff for determining the national champion at the second highest level of college football, Division I FCS, from 1978 to present.
  - NCAA Division I FCS Consensus Mid-Major Football National Championship – Awarded by poll from 2001 to 2007 for a subset of the second-highest level of play in college football, FCS.
- NCAA Division II Football Championship – Playoff for determining the national champion at the third highest level of college football from 1973 to present.
- NCAA Division III Football Championship – Playoff for determining the national champion at the fourth highest level of college football from 1973 to present.
- NAIA National Football Championship – Playoff for determining the national champions of college football governed by the National Association of Intercollegiate Athletics.
- NJCAA National Football Championship – Playoff for determining the national champions of college football governed by the National Junior College Athletic Association.
- CSFL Championship – Champions of the Collegiate Sprint Football League, a conference that plays the weight-restricted variant of sprint football.
- MSFL Championship – Launched in 2022 as the championship for the Midwest Sprint Football League, another sprint football league.

== Team maps ==
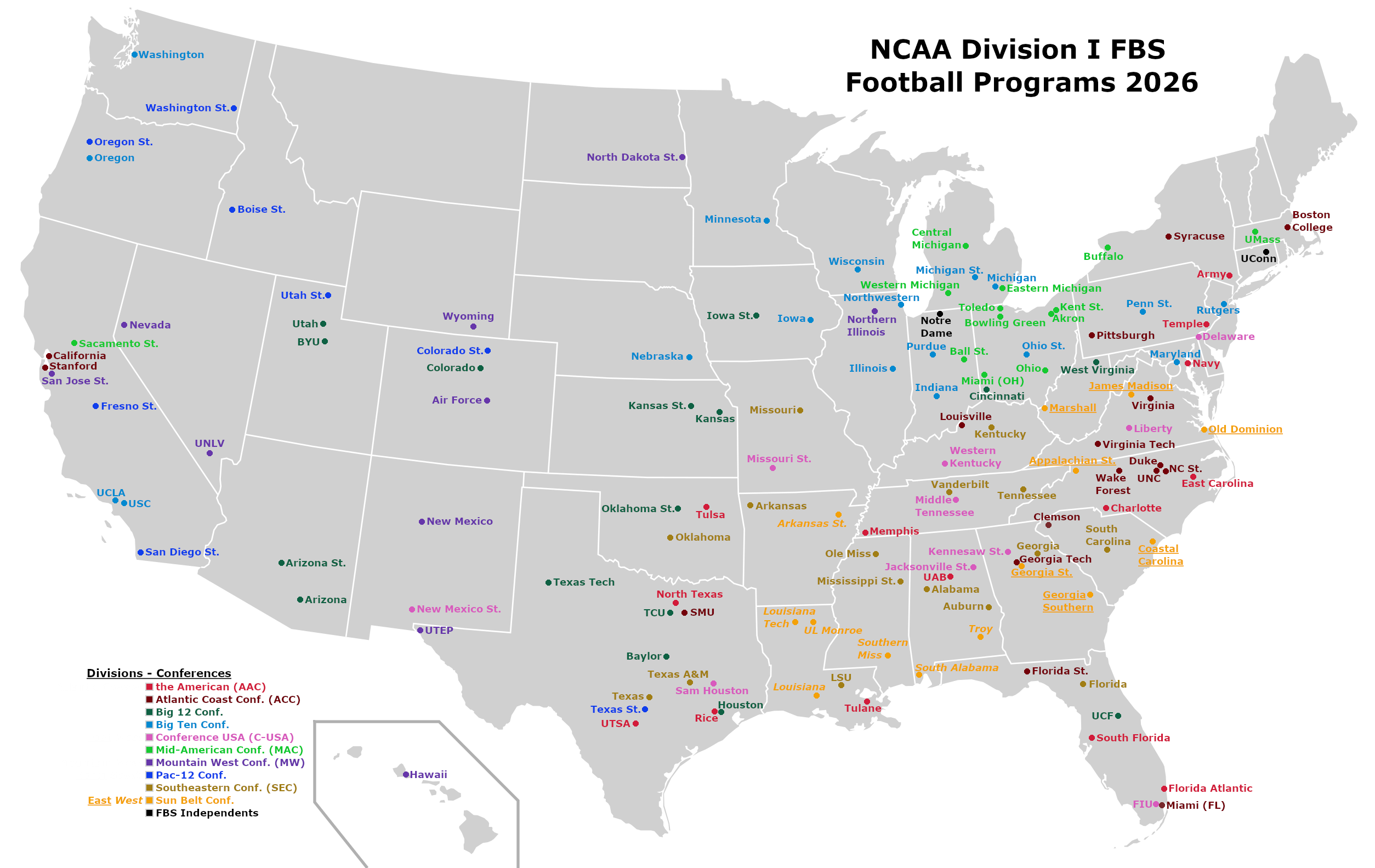
Map of Division I (A) FBS

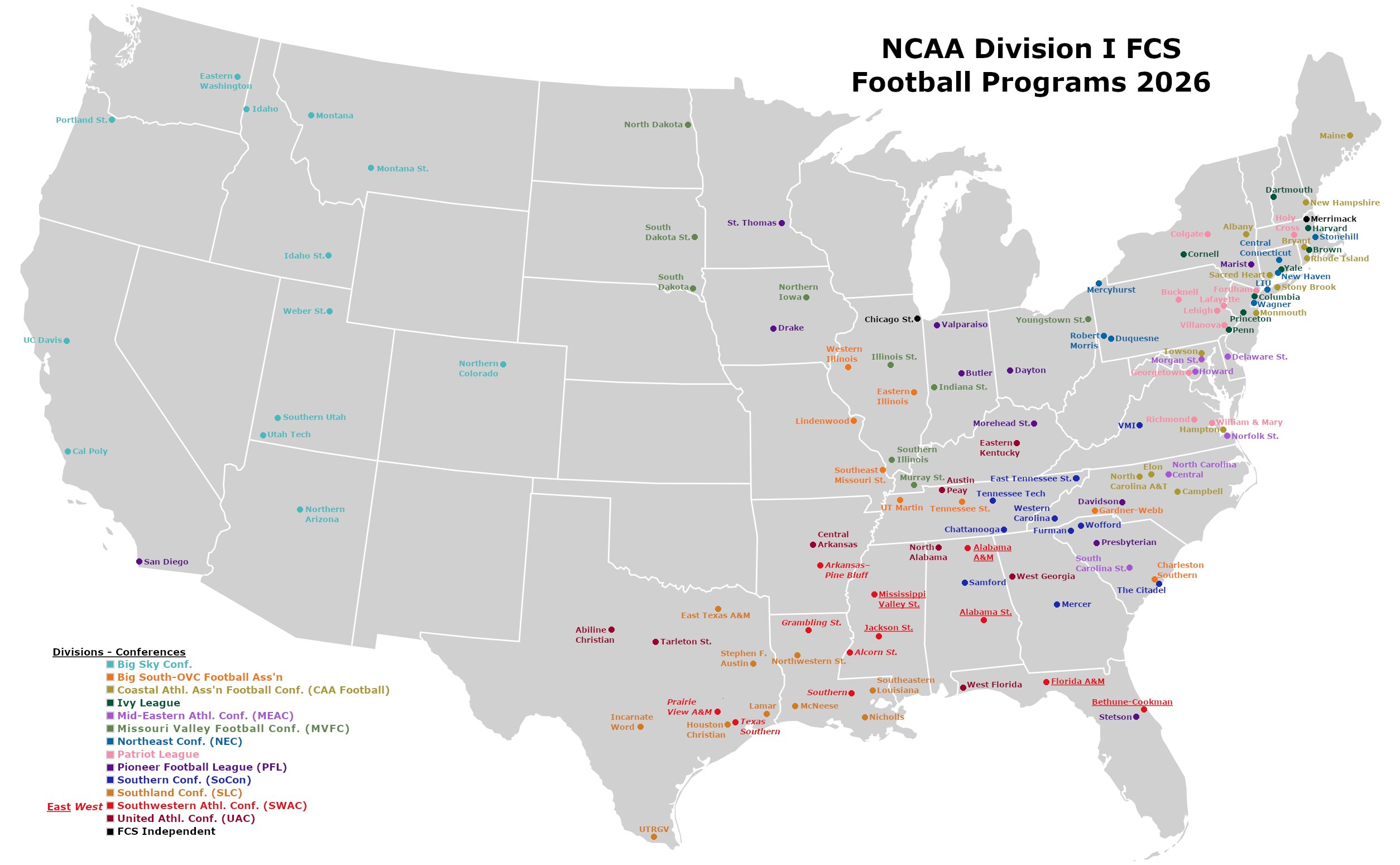
Map of Division I (AA) FCS

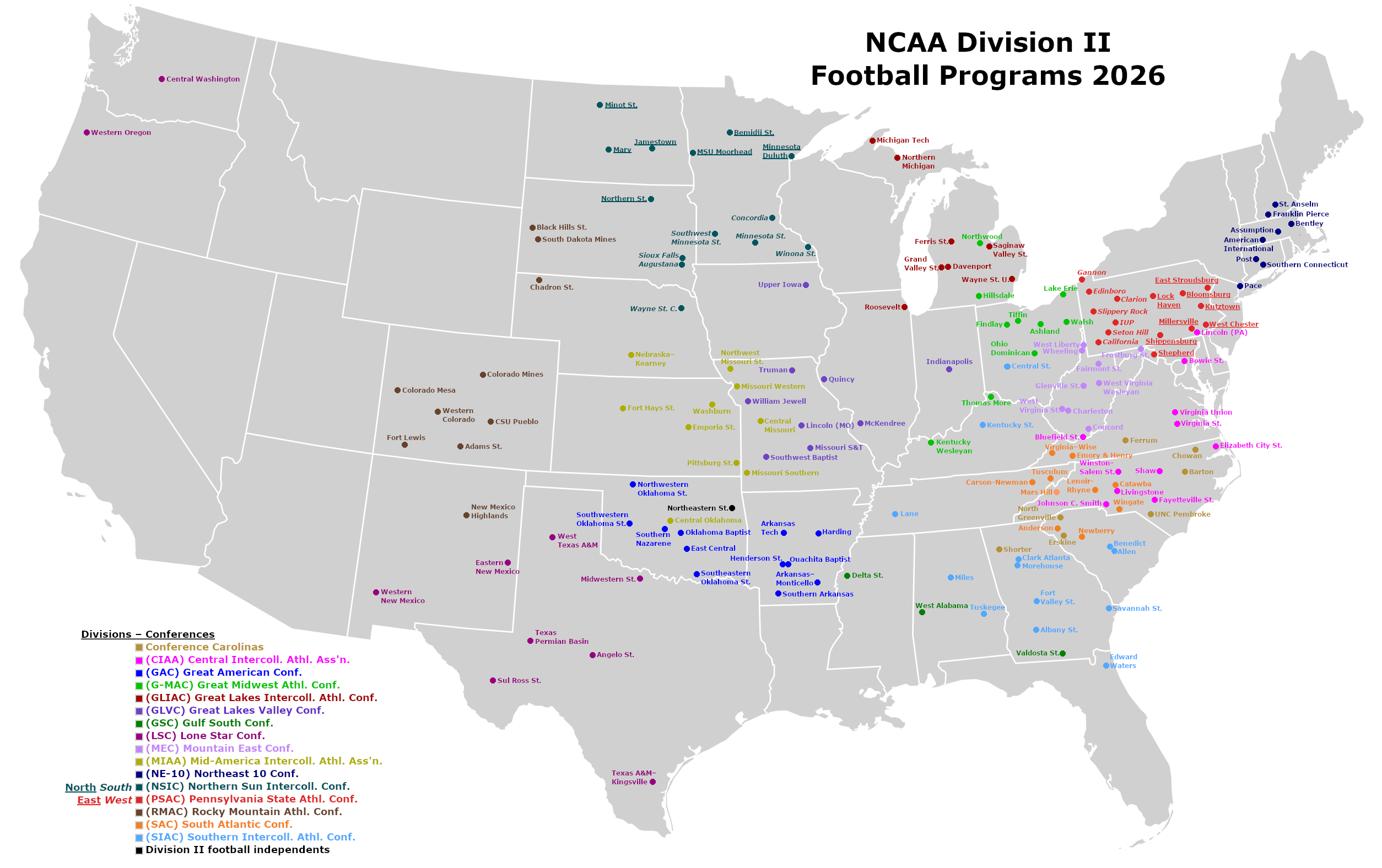
Map of NCAA Division II

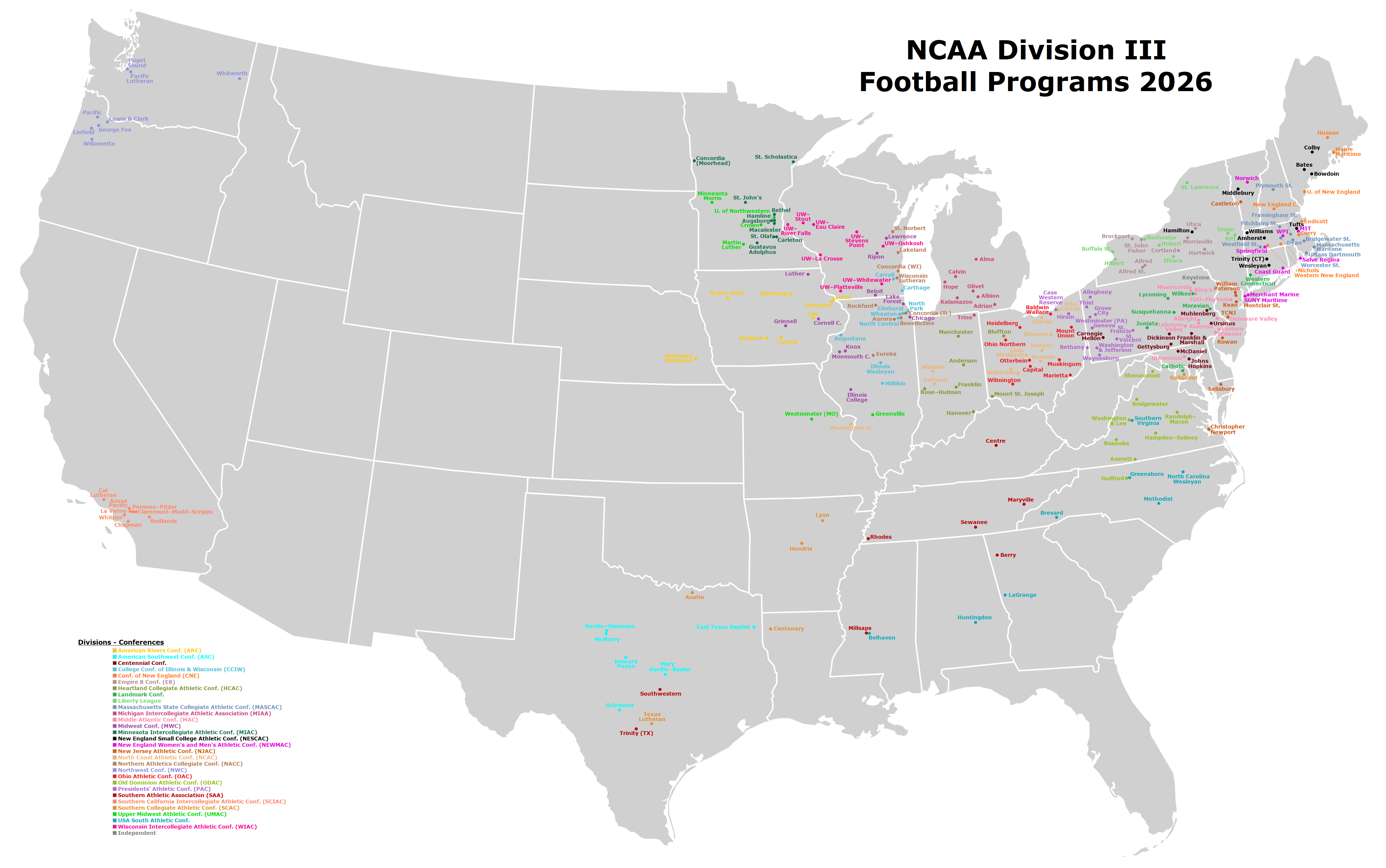
Map of NCAA Division III

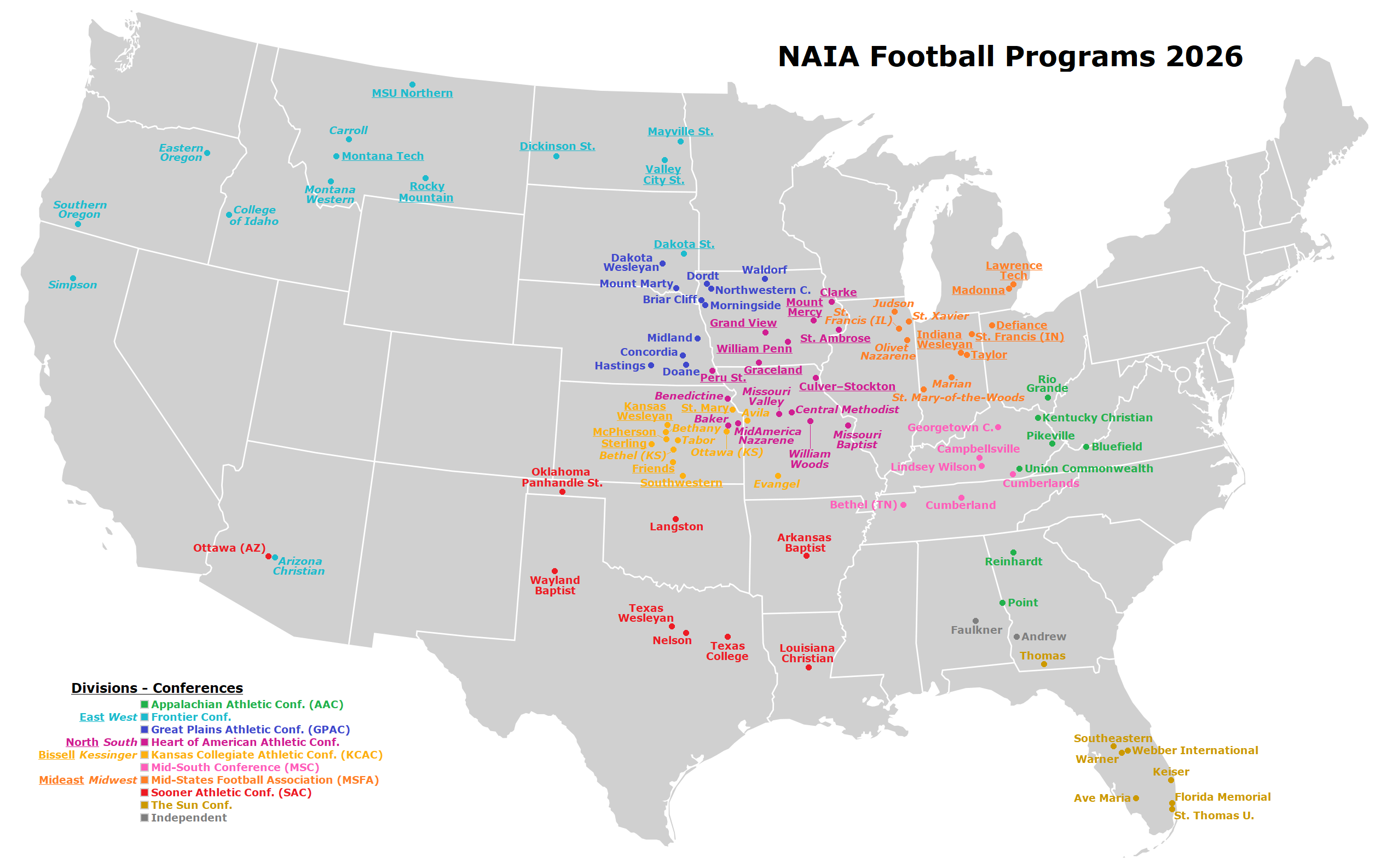
Map of NAIA

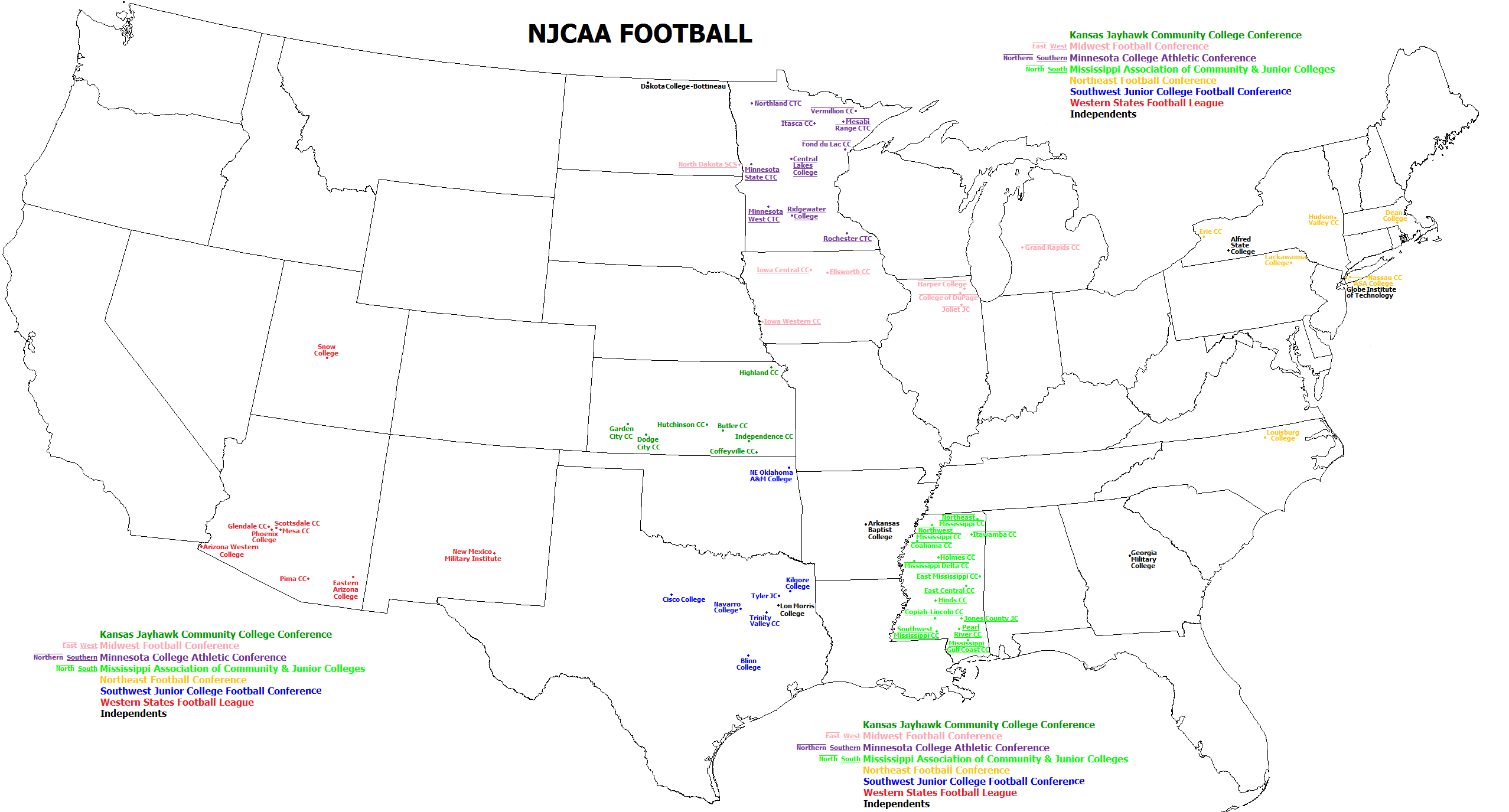
Map of NJCAA

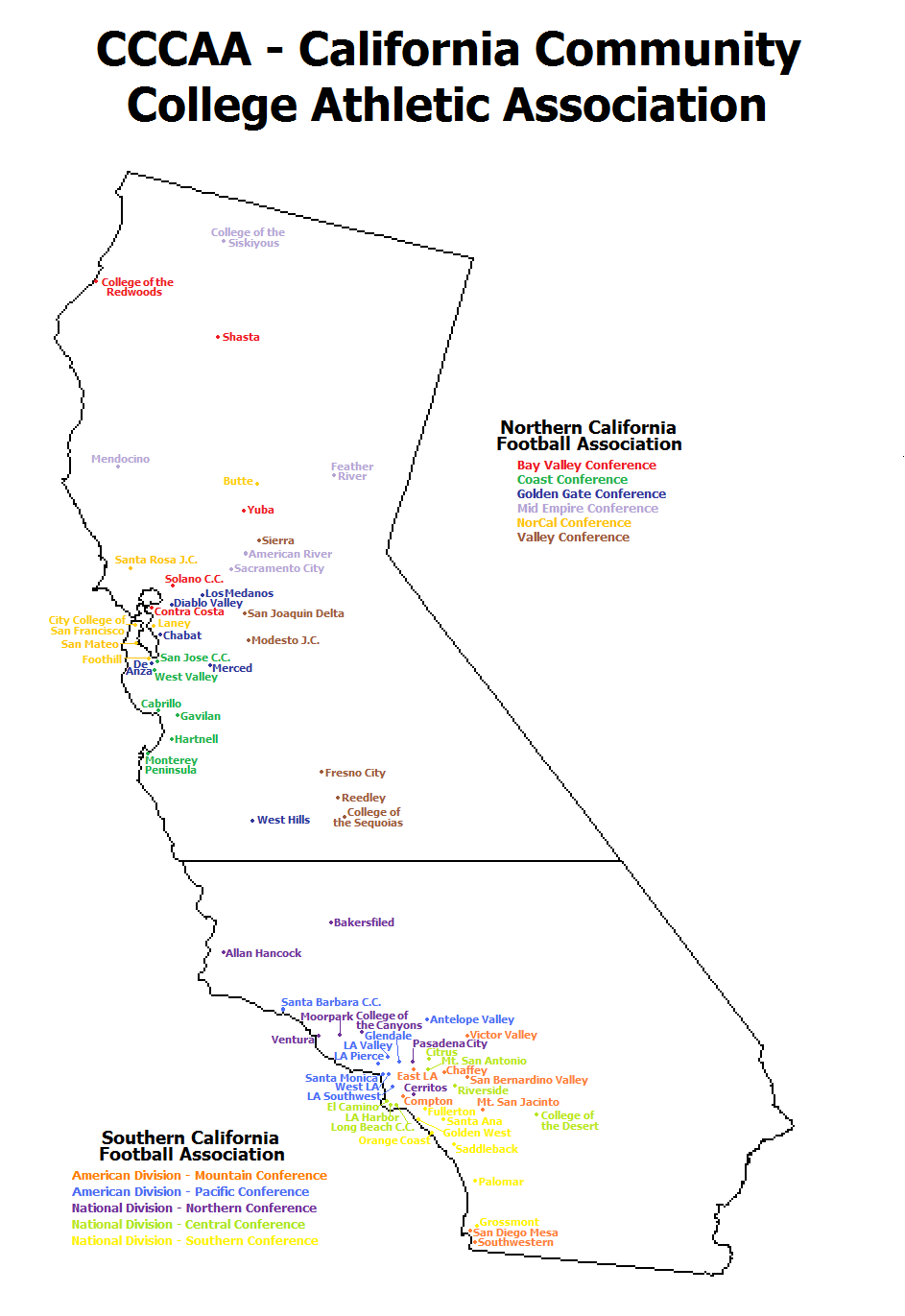
Map of CCCAA

== Bowl games ==
Unlike other college football divisions and most other sports—collegiate or professional—the Football Bowl Subdivision, formerly known as Division I-A college football, has historically not employed a playoff system to determine a champion. Instead, it has a series of postseason "bowl games". The annual National Champion in the Football Bowl Subdivision is then instead traditionally determined by a vote of sports writers and other non-players.

This system has been challenged often, beginning with an NCAA committee proposal in 1979 to have a four-team playoff following the bowl games. However, little headway was made in instituting a playoff tournament until 2014, given the entrenched vested economic interests in the various bowls. Although the NCAA publishes lists of claimed FBS-level national champions in its official publications, it has never recognized an official FBS national championship; this policy continues even after the establishment of the College Football Playoff (which is not directly run by the NCAA) in 2014. As a result, the official Division I National Champion is the winner of the Football Championship Subdivision, as it is the highest level of football with an NCAA-administered championship tournament. (This also means that FBS student-athletes are the only NCAA athletes who are ineligible for the Elite 90 Award, an academic award presented to the upper class player with the highest grade-point average among the teams that advance to the championship final site.)

The first bowl game was the 1902 Rose Bowl, played between Michigan and Stanford; Michigan won 49–0. It ended when Stanford requested and Michigan agreed to end it with 8 minutes on the clock. That game was so lopsided that the game was not played annually until 1916, when the Tournament of Roses decided to reattempt the postseason game. The term "bowl" originates from the shape of the Rose Bowl stadium in Pasadena, California, which was built in 1923 and resembled the Yale Bowl, built in 1915. This is where the name came into use, as it became known as the Rose Bowl Game. Other games came along and used the term "bowl", whether the stadium was shaped like a bowl or not.

At the Division I FBS level, teams must earn the right to be bowl eligible by winning at least 6 games during the season (teams that play 13 games in a season, which is allowed for Hawaii and any of its home opponents, must win 7 games). They are then invited to a bowl game based on their conference ranking and the tie-ins that the conference has to each bowl game. For the 2009 season, there were 34 bowl games, so 68 of the 120 Division I FBS teams were invited to play at a bowl. These games are played from mid-December to early January and most of the later bowl games are typically considered more prestigious.

After the Bowl Championship Series, additional all-star bowl games round out the post-season schedule through the beginning of February.

=== Division I FBS national championship games ===
Partly as a compromise between both bowl game and playoff supporters, the NCAA created the Bowl Championship Series (BCS) in 1998 to create a definitive national championship game for college football. The series included the four most prominent bowl games (Rose Bowl, Orange Bowl, Sugar Bowl, Fiesta Bowl), while the national championship game rotated each year between one of these venues. The BCS system was slightly adjusted in 2006, as the NCAA added a fifth game to the series, called the National Championship Game. This allowed the four other BCS bowls to use their normal selection process to select the teams in their games while the top two teams in the BCS rankings would play in the new National Championship Game.

The BCS selection committee used a complicated, and often controversial, computer system to rank all Division I-FBS teams and the top two teams at the end of the season played for the national championship. This computer system, which factored in newspaper polls, online polls, coaches' polls, strength of schedule, and various other factors of a team's season, led to much dispute over whether the two best teams in the country were being selected to play in the National Championship Game.

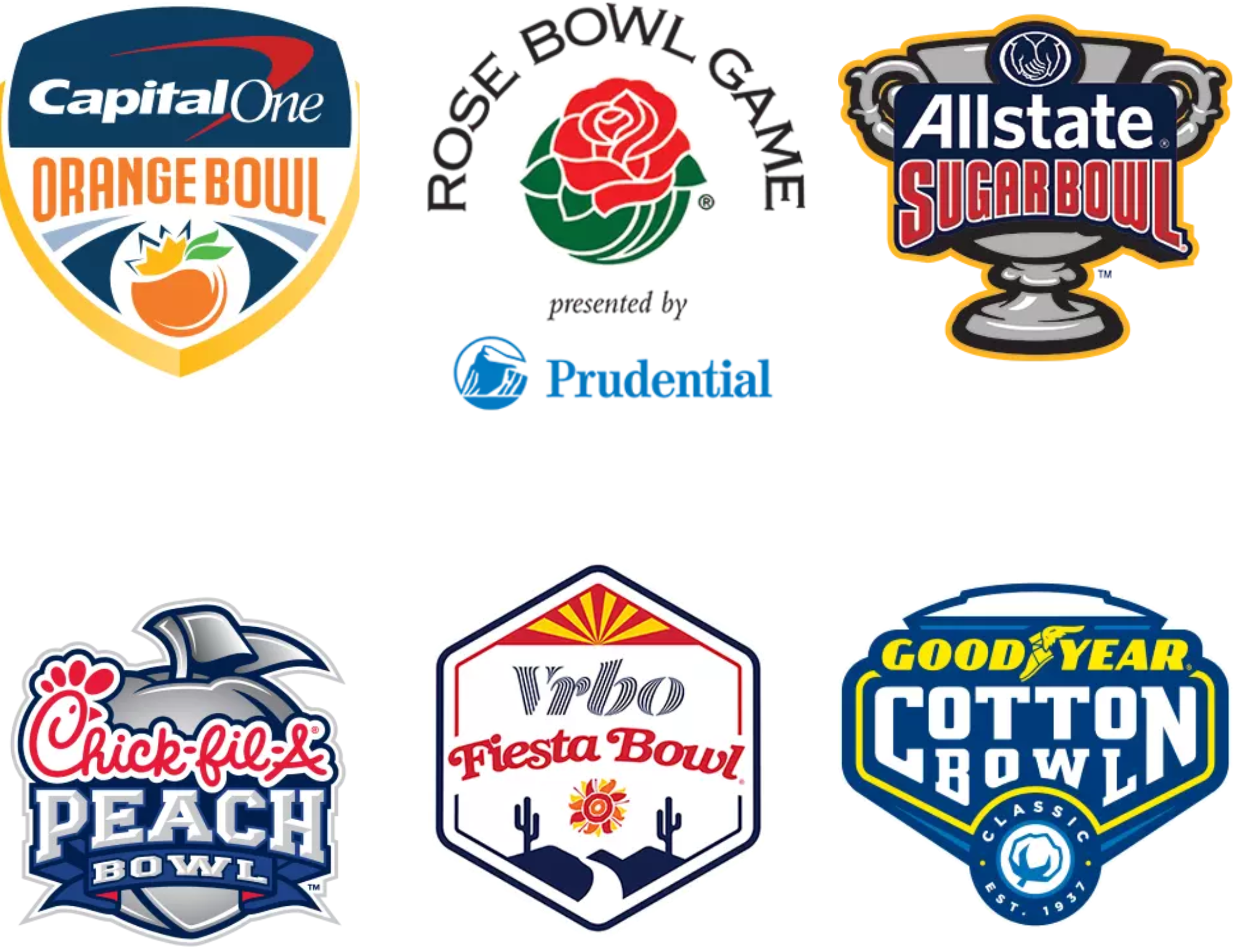
NY6 Bowl Games

The BCS ended after the 2013 season and, since the 2014 season, the FBS national champion has been determined by a four-team tournament known as the College Football Playoff (CFP). A selection committee of college football experts decides the participating teams. Six major bowl games known as the New Year's Six (NY6)—the Rose, Sugar, Cotton, Orange, Peach, and Fiesta Bowls—rotate on a three-year cycle as semi-final games, with the winners advancing to the College Football Playoff National Championship. This arrangement was contractually locked in until the 2026 season, but an agreement was reached on CFP expansion to 12 teams effective with the 2024 season.

In the new CFP format, no conferences will receive automatic bids. Playoff berths will be awarded to the top six conference champions in the CFP rankings, plus the top six remaining teams (which may include other conference champions). The top four conference champions receive first-round byes. All first-round games will be played at the home field of the higher seed. The winners of these games advance to meet the top four seeds in the quarterfinals. The NY6 games will host the quarterfinals and semi-finals, rotating so that each bowl game will host two quarterfinals and one semi-final in a three-year cycle. The CFP National Championship will continue to be held at a site determined by open bidding several years in advance.

== Awards ==
=== Division I FBS ===
- Heisman Trophy
- Maxwell Award
- Walter Camp Award
- Outland Trophy
- Associated Press Player of the Year
- Johnny Rodgers Award
- Fred Biletnikoff Award
- Lou Groza Award
- Lombardi Award
- Bronko Nagurski Trophy
- Dick Butkus Award
- Jim Thorpe Award
- Doak Walker Award
- Campbell Trophy
- Johnny Unitas Golden Arm Award
- Home Depot Award
- Ray Guy Award
- John Mackey Award
- Burlsworth Trophy
- Jet Award
- Paul Hornung Award
- Jon Cornish Trophy
- Patrick Mannelly Award

=== Division I FCS ===
- Walter Payton Award
- Buck Buchanan Award
- Jerry Rice Award

== Controversy ==
With college football being a business that brings in over 1 billion dollars a year, there are some points of controversy. Usually corruption is involved with businesses that bring in that much money and college football is no different. The only difference is that the universities are ill-equipped to deal with said corruption. According to William E. Kirwan, chancellor of the University System of Maryland and co-director of the Knight Commission on Intercollegiate Athletics, "We've reached a point where big-time intercollegiate athletics is undermining the integrity of our institutions, diverting presidents and institutions from their main purpose." Football coaches often make more than the presidents of the universities which employ them. Athletes are alleged to receive preferential treatment both in academics and when they run afoul of the law. Although in theory football is an extra-curricular activity engaged in as a sideline by students, it is widely believed to turn a substantial profit, from which the athletes receive no direct benefit. There has been serious discussion about making student-athletes university employees to allow them to be paid. In reality, the majority of major collegiate football programs operated at a financial loss in 2014.

There had been discussions on changing rules that prohibited compensation for the use of a player's name, image, and likeness (NIL), but change did not start to come until the mid-2010s. This reform first took place in the NAIA, which initially allowed all student-athletes at its member schools to receive NIL compensation in 2014, and beginning in 2020 specifically allowed these individuals to reference their athletic participation in their endorsement deals. The NCAA passed its own NIL reform, very similar to the NAIA's most recent reform, in July 2021, after its hand was forced by multiple states that had passed legislation allowing NIL compensation, most notably California. NIL deals have allowed college athletes to entertain pushing off entering the draft given their ability to earn large wages while finishing their degrees.

On June 3 of 2021, "The NCAA's board of directors adopted a temporary rule change that opened the door for NIL activity, instructing schools to set their own policy for what should be allowed with minimal guidelines" (Murphy 2021). On July 1 of 2021, the new rules set in and student athletes could start signing endorsements using their name, image and likeness. "The NCAA has asked Congress for help in creating a federal NIL law. While several federal options have been proposed, it's becoming increasingly likely that state laws will start to go into effect before a nationwide change is made. There are 28 states with NIL laws already in place and multiple others that are actively pursuing legislation" (Murphy 2021).

Charlie Baker called for a ban on all college football betting (and betting on college sports in general) because of prop bets for student athletes. With past scandals and threats to college athletes, Baker requested states with sports betting to adjust their regulations to remove these bet types. While some were quick to do so (including Louisiana, Colorado, Ohio), others rejected the notion and continued to offer sports betting the same way.

=== Injuries ===
According to 2017 study on brains of deceased gridiron football players, 99% of tested brains of NFL players, 88% of CFL players, 64% of semi-professional players, 91% of college football players, and 21% of high school football players had various stages of CTE. The study noted that it has limitations due to "selection bias" in that the brains donated are from families who suspected CTE, but "The fact that we were able to gather so many instances of a disease that was previously considered quite rare, in eight years, speaks volumes." This study however, is dated and there has been some speculation that this was an attempt at shutting down football for children as it only picked the prolonged CTE patients and heavily injured professional players. Over the last decade injury prevention has taken leaps and bounds in all levels of football.

==== Helmet safety measures ====
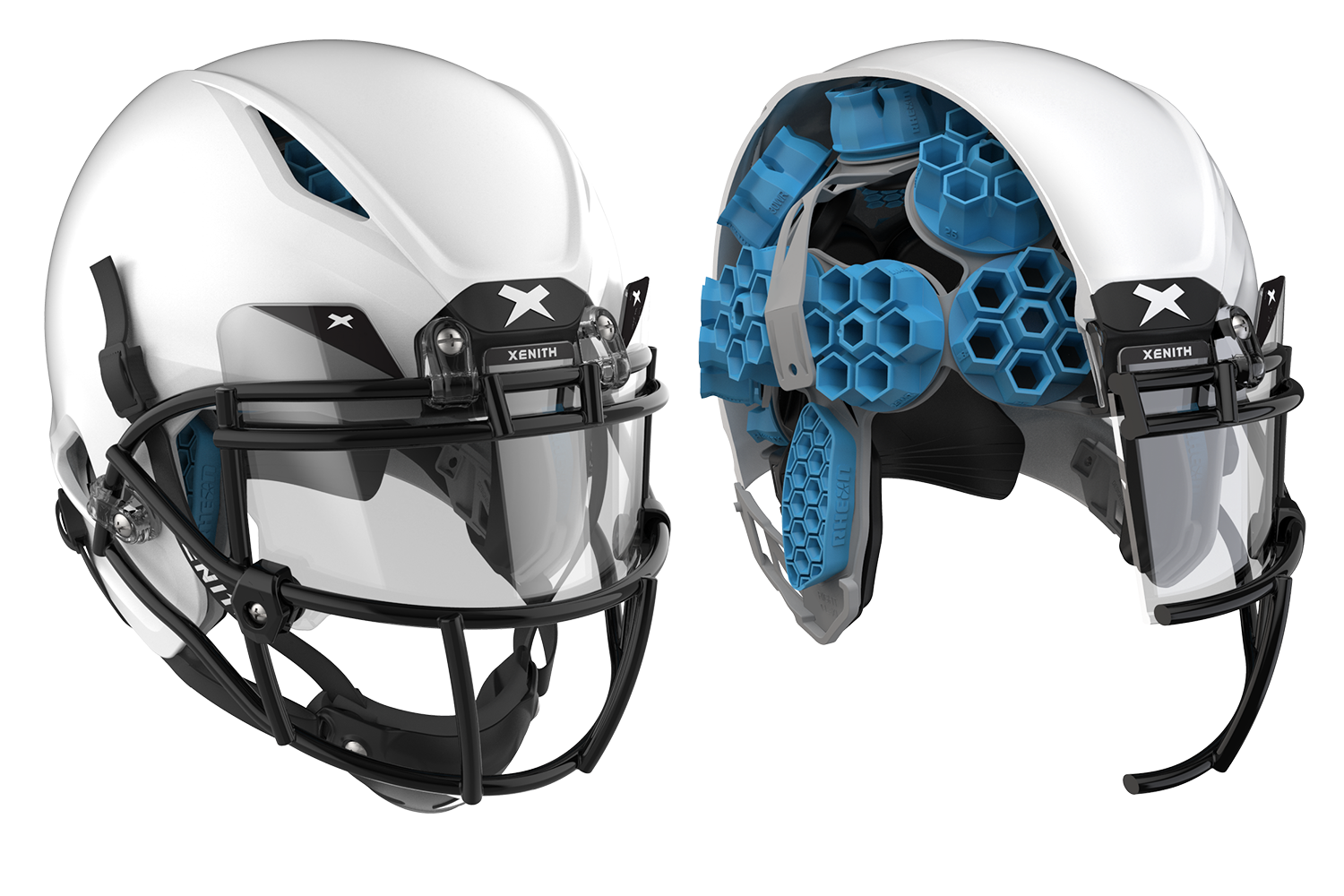
Center cut of a modern Xenith helmet

With the large number of injuries in college football, there was a push to lower the risk of head- and neck-related injuries. With this, the NCAA and NFL have pushed the bar in helmet technology. With the introduction of National Operating Committee on Standards for Athletic Equipment in 1978, helmet standards has taken leaps and bounds toward being safer for players. These new helmets are packed with sensors, gel padding and new age technology. With these advanced helmets being used now, there has been a downturn in concussions across all levels of college football. With the push for safer helmets comes the introduction of the Guardian Cap, this is a soft shell like pad that goes over the helmet of a player in practice that reduces the chances of head injury by 40%. This cap is worn by most players in practice but very few use the cap in game because of the large diameter it adds to the helmet. Furthermore, the NCAA mandates that all teams put their respective helmets through recertification. This puts the helmets through testing, cleaning and calibration to ensure greater safety for all players.

== Attendances ==
The table shows the three intercollegiate American football teams with the highest average home attendance per year.

Year	Team #1	Av. attendance #1	Team #2	Av. attendance #2	Team #3	Av. attendance #3
1949	Michigan	93,894	Ohio State	76,429	SMU	60,500
1950	Michigan	82,321	Ohio State	73,604	SMU	61,800
1951	Ohio State	75,956	Michigan	74,273	Illinois	59,259
1952	Ohio State	75,652	Michigan	65,985	Texas	62,232
1953	Ohio State	79,600	Southern California	68,936	Michigan	58,977
1954	Ohio State	79,973	Michigan	68,242	UCLA	63,674
1955	Michigan	77,834	Ohio State	70,454	Southern California	66,726
1956	Ohio State	82,429	Michigan	80,878	Minnesota	62,568
1957	Michigan	84,159	Ohio State	80,686	Minnesota	63,988
1958	Ohio State	82,225	Michigan	67,519	LSU	59,315
1959	Ohio State	82,589	Michigan	76,064	LSU	58,390
1960	Ohio State	82,717	Michigan State	68,592	Michigan	62,447
1961	Ohio State	82,942	Michigan	73,561	LSU	63,651
1962	Ohio State	82,941	LSU	66,284	Michigan State	68,142
1963	Ohio State	83,205	LSU	66,141	Michigan State	65,319
1964	Ohio State	83,391	Michigan State	71,233	Michigan	64,805
1965	Ohio State	83,256	Michigan	80,081	Michigan State	69,259
1966	Ohio State	81,400	Michigan State	71,125	Michigan	68,933
1967	Ohio State	76,700	Michigan	74,548	Michigan State	68,653
1968	Ohio State	80,427	Southern California	70,989	Michigan State	69,030
1969	Ohio State	86,235	Michigan	71,463	Michigan State	70,425
1970	Ohio State	86,490	Michigan	79,361	Purdue	68,018
1971	Ohio State	84,450	Michigan	80,625	Wisconsin	68,148
1972	Michigan	85,566	Ohio State	84,903	Nebraska	76,143
1973	Ohio State	87,228	Michigan	85,024	Nebraska	76,121
1974	Michigan	93,684	Ohio State	87,552	Nebraska	76,341
1975	Michigan	98,449	Ohio State	87,856	Nebraska	76,195
1976	Michigan	103,159	Ohio State	87,702	Tennessee	80,703
1977	Michigan	104,203	Ohio State	87,589	Tennessee	83,283
1978	Michigan	104,948	Ohio State	87,840	Tennessee	78,422
1979	Michigan	104,331	Ohio State	87,399	Tennessee	85,357
1980	Michigan	104,292	Tennessee	88,649	Ohio State	87,925
1981	Michigan	105,498	Tennessee	93,166	Ohio State	86,960
1982	Michigan	105,291	Tennessee	93,517	Ohio State	89,022
1983	Michigan	104,486	Ohio State	89,018	Tennessee	84,928
1984	Michigan	103,819	Tennessee	93,515	Ohio State	89,449
1985	Michigan	105,588	Tennessee	94,099	Ohio State	89,214
1986	Michigan	105,210	Tennessee	91,902	Ohio State	89,368
1987	Michigan	104,469	Tennessee	88,179	Ohio State	85,295
1988	Michigan	104,801	Tennessee	91,946	Ohio State	86,162
1989	Michigan	105,356	Tennessee	93,917	Ohio State	85,302
1990	Michigan	104,508	Tennessee	95,220	Ohio State	89,383
1991	Michigan	105,337	Tennessee	96,398	Penn State	95,846
1992	Michigan	105,867	Tennessee	95,924	Penn State	94,866
1993	Michigan	105,660	Tennessee	95,326	Penn State	94,032
1994	Michigan	106,217	Penn State	96,289	Tennessee	95,637
1995	Michigan	103,767	Tennessee	94,694	Penn State	93,591
1996	Michigan	105,932	Tennessee	105,418	Penn State	96,167
1997	Michigan	106,448	Tennessee	106,538	Penn State	97,086
1998	Michigan	110,965	Tennessee	106,914	Penn State	96,532
1999	Michigan	111,175	Tennessee	106,839	Penn State	96,500
2000	Michigan	110,822	Tennessee	107,595	Ohio State	97,757
2001	Michigan	109,908	Penn State	107,576	Tennessee	106,843
2002	Michigan	110,576	Penn State	107,239	Tennessee	106,705
2003	Michigan	110,918	Penn State	105,629	Tennessee	105,038
2004	Michigan	111,025	Tennessee	106,644	Ohio State	104,876
2005	Michigan	110,915	Tennessee	107,593	Ohio State	105,017
2006	Michigan	110,026	Penn State	107,567	Tennessee	105,789
2007	Michigan	110,624	Penn State	108,917	Ohio State	105,110
2008	Michigan	108,571	Penn State	108,254	Ohio State	104,976
2009	Michigan	108,933	Penn State	107,008	Ohio State	105,261
2010	Michigan	111,825	Ohio State	105,278	Penn State	104,234
2011	Michigan	112,179	Ohio State	105,231	Alabama	101,821
2012	Michigan	112,252	Ohio State	105,330	Alabama	101,722
2013	Michigan	112,252	Ohio State	105,330	Alabama	101,722
2014	Ohio State	106,296	Texas A&M	105,123	Michigan	104,909
2015	Michigan	110,168	Ohio State	107,244	Texas A&M	103,622
2016	Michigan	110,468	Ohio State	107,278	Texas A&M	101,917
2017	Michigan	111,589	Ohio State	107,496	Penn State	106,707
2018	Michigan	110,737	Penn State	105,485	Ohio State	101,947
2019	Michigan	111,459	Penn State	105,678	Ohio State	103,383
2021	Michigan	108,763	Penn State	106,799	Texas A&M	102,883
2022	Michigan	110,246	Penn State	107,379	Ohio State	104,663
2023	Michigan	109,971	Penn State	108,409	Ohio State	103,792
2024	Michigan	110,548	Penn State	108,083	Ohio State	104,061

== College football outside the United States ==
Canadian football, which parallels American football, is played by university teams in Canada under the auspices of U Sports. (Unlike in the United States, no junior colleges play football in Canada, and the sanctioning body for junior college athletics in Canada, CCAA, does not sanction the sport.) However, amateur football outside of colleges is played in Canada, such as in the Canadian Junior Football League. Organized competition in American football also exists at the collegiate level in Mexico (ONEFA), the UK (British Universities American Football League), Japan (Japan American Football Association, Koshien Bowl), and South Korea (Korea American Football Association).

== See also ==
- Concussions in American football
- College athletics in the United States
- University and college sport
  - College rugby
  - College basketball
  - College baseball
  - College ice hockey
  - College soccer
  - College lacrosse
- Helmet stickers
- Homosexuality in American football
- List of nicknamed college football games and plays
- List of sports attendance figures
- Sports injury

== Sources ==
- Bennett, Tom (1976). The Pro Style. Prentice-Hall. ISBN 978-0-13-731604-5.
- MacCambridge, Michael (1999). ESPN SportsCentury. Hyperion. ISBN 978-0-7868-6471-3. OCLC 761166567.
- Vancil, Mark, ed. (2000). ABC Sports College Football: All Time All America Team. Hyperion. ISBN 978-0-7868-6710-3.
