= 1928 UCLA Bruins football team =

American college football season

1928 UCLA Bruins football
- Conference: Pacific Coast Conference
- Record: 4–4–1 (0–4 PCC)
- Head coach: William H. Spaulding (4th season)
- Home stadium: Moore Field; Los Angeles Memorial Coliseum

1928 Pacific Coast Conference football standings
	Conf.					Overall
Team	W		L		T	W		L		T
No. 1 USC $	4	–	0	–	1	9	–	0	–	1
No. 2 California ^	3	–	0	–	2	6	–	2	–	2
No. 4 Stanford	4	–	1	–	1	8	–	3	–	1
Oregon	4	–	2	–	0	9	–	2	–	0
Washington State	4	–	3	–	0	7	–	3	–	0
Oregon State	2	–	3	–	0	6	–	3	–	0
Idaho	2	–	3	–	0	3	–	4	–	1
Washington	2	–	4	–	0	7	–	4	–	0
UCLA	0	–	4	–	0	4	–	4	–	1
Montana	0	–	5	–	0	4	–	5	–	1
$ – Conference champion; ^ – Selected as Rose Bowl representative (USC declined); Rankings from Dickinson System

The 1928 UCLA Bruins football team was an American football team that represented the University of California, Los Angeles (UCLA) during the 1928 college football season. In their fourth year under head coach William H. Spaulding and their first as a member of the Pacific Coast Conference (PCC), the Bruins (known as UCLA Grizzlies in the previous season) compiled a 4–4–1 record (0–4 conference), finished in ninth place in the PCC, and outscored their opponents by a combined total of 171 to 136.

== Schedule ==
Date	Opponent	Site	Result	Attendance	Source
September 22	Santa Barbara State*	Moore Field; Los Angeles, CA	W 19–0	10,000	
September 29	Arizona*	Moore Field; Los Angeles, CA	T 7–7		
October 6	at Caltech*	Rose Bowl; Pasadena, CA	W 32–0		
October 13	at Stanford	Stanford Stadium; Stanford, CA	L 7–45		
October 20	Pomona*	Los Angeles Memorial Coliseum; Los Angeles, CA	W 29–0		
October 27	at Idaho	MacLean Field; Moscow, ID	L 6–20		
November 10	vs. Washington State	Multnomah Stadium; Portland, OR	L 0–38	1,000	
November 17	La Verne*	Moore Field; Los Angeles, CA	W 65–0	50,000	
November 29	Oregon	Los Angeles Memorial Coliseum; Los Angeles, CA	L 6–26	35,000	
*Non-conference game
