= 1928 California Golden Bears football team =

American college football season

1928 California Golden Bears football

Rose Bowl, L 7–8 vs. Georgia Tech
- Conference: Pacific Coast Conference
- Record: 6–2–2 (3–0–2 PCC)
- Head coach: Nibs Price (3rd season)
- Captain: Irvine Phillips
- Home stadium: California Memorial Stadium

Uniform
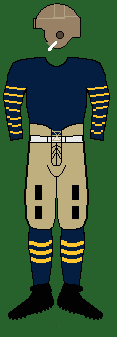

1928 Pacific Coast Conference football standings
	Conf.					Overall
Team	W		L		T	W		L		T
No. 1 USC $	4	–	0	–	1	9	–	0	–	1
No. 2 California ^	3	–	0	–	2	6	–	2	–	2
No. 4 Stanford	4	–	1	–	1	8	–	3	–	1
Oregon	4	–	2	–	0	9	–	2	–	0
Washington State	4	–	3	–	0	7	–	3	–	0
Oregon State	2	–	3	–	0	6	–	3	–	0
Idaho	2	–	3	–	0	3	–	4	–	1
Washington	2	–	4	–	0	7	–	4	–	0
UCLA	0	–	4	–	0	4	–	4	–	1
Montana	0	–	5	–	0	4	–	5	–	1
$ – Conference champion; ^ – Selected as Rose Bowl representative (USC declined); Rankings from Dickinson System

The 1928 California Golden Bears football team was an American football team that represented the University of California, Berkeley in the Pacific Coast Conference (PCC) during the 1928 college football season. In their third year under head coach Nibs Price, the team compiled a 6–2–2 record (3–0–2 against PCC opponents), finished in second place in the PCC, lost to Georgia Tech in the 1929 Rose Bowl, and outscored its opponents by a combined total of 141 to 36. The team was ranked No. 2 in the nation in the Dickinson System ratings released in December 1928.

The Rose Bowl game has become one of the most famous moments in Rose Bowl history. In the second quarter, California's defense forced a Georgia Tech fumble on their own 30-yard line, and the loose ball was scooped up by California center Roy Riegels. He began to run towards the Georgia Tech end zone for a score, but then, in trying to get around the Tech players, he inexplicably turned around and headed in the other direction. Riegels advanced all the way to the Golden Bears' one-yard line before teammate Benny Lom was able to stop him, whereupon he was immediately tackled by what seemed like the entire Georgia Tech team. California elected to punt on the next play; the punt was blocked for a safety, giving the Yellow Jackets a 2–0 lead and what turned out to be the decisive points.

== Schedule ==
Date	Opponent	Site	Result	Attendance	Source
September 29	Santa Clara*	California Memorial Stadium; Berkeley, CA	W 22–0	40,000	
October 6	Saint Mary's*	California Memorial Stadium; Berkeley, CA	W 7–0	60,000	
October 13	Washington State	California Memorial Stadium; Berkeley, CA	W 13–3	30,000	
October 20	USC	California Memorial Stadium; Berkeley, CA	T 0–0	74,245–80,000	
October 27	Olympic Club*	California Memorial Stadium; Berkeley, CA	L 0–12	35,000	
November 3	Oregon	California Memorial Stadium; Berkeley, CA	W 13–0		
November 10	at Washington	Husky Stadium; Seattle, WA	W 6–0	20,000	
November 17	Nevada*	California Memorial Stadium; Berkeley, CA	W 60–0		
November 24	Stanford	California Memorial Stadium; Berkeley, CA (Big Game)	T 13–13	90,000	
January 1, 1929	vs. Georgia Tech*	Rose Bowl; Pasadena, CA (Rose Bowl)	L 7–8	66,604	
*Non-conference game
