= 1928 Idaho Vandals football team =

American college football season

1928 Idaho Vandals football
- Conference: Pacific Coast Conference
- Record: 3–4–1 (2–3 PCC)
- Head coach: Charles F. Erb (3rd season)
- Home stadium: MacLean Field

1928 Pacific Coast Conference football standings
	Conf.					Overall
Team	W		L		T	W		L		T
No. 1 USC $	4	–	0	–	1	9	–	0	–	1
No. 2 California ^	3	–	0	–	2	6	–	2	–	2
No. 4 Stanford	4	–	1	–	1	8	–	3	–	1
Oregon	4	–	2	–	0	9	–	2	–	0
Washington State	4	–	3	–	0	7	–	3	–	0
Oregon State	2	–	3	–	0	6	–	3	–	0
Idaho	2	–	3	–	0	3	–	4	–	1
Washington	2	–	4	–	0	7	–	4	–	0
UCLA	0	–	4	–	0	4	–	4	–	1
Montana	0	–	5	–	0	4	–	5	–	1
$ – Conference champion; ^ – Selected as Rose Bowl representative (USC declined); Rankings from Dickinson System

The 1928 Idaho Vandals football team represented the University of Idaho in the 1928 college football season. The Vandals were led by third-year head coach Charles F. Erb and were in their seventh season in the Pacific Coast Conference. Home games were played on campus in Moscow at MacLean Field. Idaho compiled a 3–4–1 overall record and went 2–3 in conference games.

In their first year in the conference, UCLA traveled to Moscow in late October and fell, 20–6. It was UCLA's only loss in the seven-game series; the teams have not met since 1948. Idaho's only other win over a PCC team from the state of California came in 1947 at Stanford.

The week after the win over UCLA was the Battle of the Palouse with neighbor Washington State, and the visiting Cougars inflicted a 26–0 homecoming shutout before 10,000; the teams had tied the previous season in Pullman. Prior to the start of the game, the new Memorial Gymnasium was presented to the university; the venue honors state residents who gave their lives in the service of their country in World War I.

Amid speculation about his future at Idaho, Erb resigned on December 22, four weeks after the season's completion. He was succeeded by Leo Calland, a USC assistant coach and former player for the Trojans.

== Schedule ==
Date	Opponent	Site	Result	Attendance	Source
September 29	Montana State*	MacLean Field; Moscow, ID	L 13–15		
October 6	at Gonzaga*	Gonzaga Stadium; Spokane, WA	T 6–6		
October 13	Whitman*	MacLean Field; Moscow, ID	W 26–13		
October 19	at Stanford	Kezar Stadium; San Francisco, CA	L 0–47	19,000	
October 27	UCLA	MacLean Field; Moscow, ID	W 20–6		
November 3	Washington State^{†}	MacLean Field; Moscow, ID (Battle of the Palouse)	L 0–26	10,000	
November 17	at Montana	Dornblaser Field; Missoula, MT (rivalry)	W 21–7		
November 24	at USC	Los Angeles Memorial Coliseum; Los Angeles, CA	L 7–28	10,000	
*Non-conference game; ^{†}Homecoming
