= 1928 USC Trojans football team =

American college football season

1928 USC Trojans football
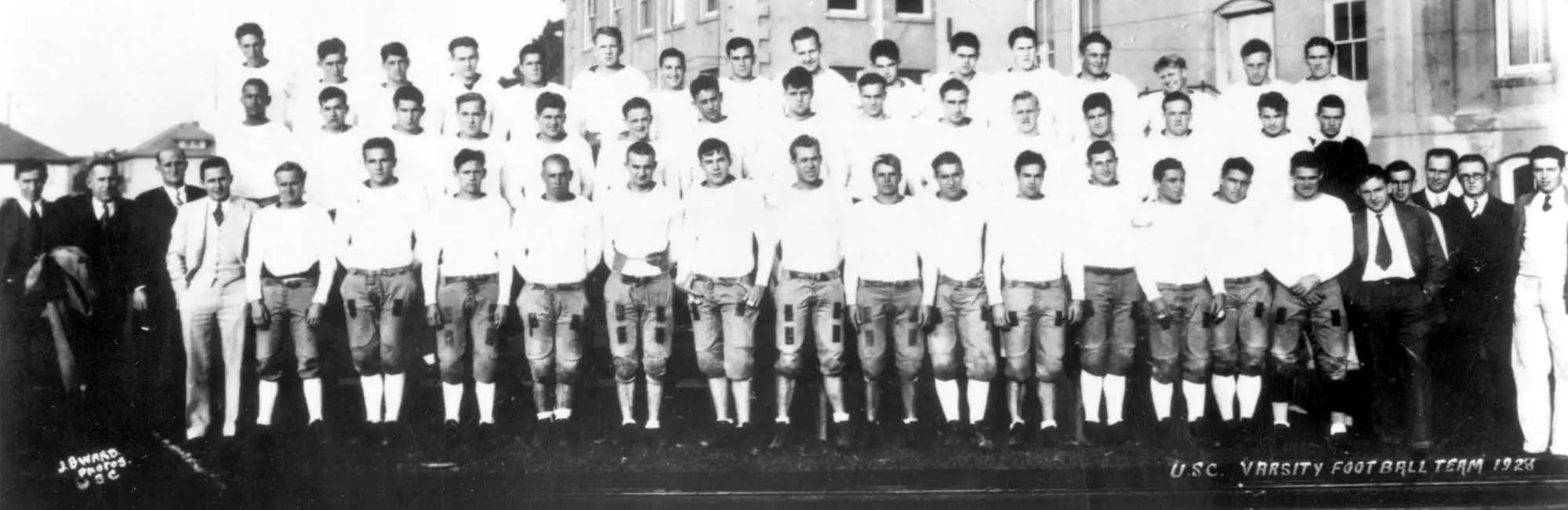

National champion (Dickinson) Co-national champion (Sagarin) PCC champion
- Conference: Pacific Coast Conference
- Record: 9–0–1 (4–0–1 PCC)
- Head coach: Howard Jones (4th season)
- Offensive scheme: Single-wing
- Captain: Jesse Hibbs
- Home stadium: Los Angeles Memorial Coliseum

1928 Pacific Coast Conference football standings
	Conf.					Overall
Team	W		L		T	W		L		T
No. 1 USC $	4	–	0	–	1	9	–	0	–	1
No. 2 California ^	3	–	0	–	2	6	–	2	–	2
No. 4 Stanford	4	–	1	–	1	8	–	3	–	1
Oregon	4	–	2	–	0	9	–	2	–	0
Washington State	4	–	3	–	0	7	–	3	–	0
Oregon State	2	–	3	–	0	6	–	3	–	0
Idaho	2	–	3	–	0	3	–	4	–	1
Washington	2	–	4	–	0	7	–	4	–	0
UCLA	0	–	4	–	0	4	–	4	–	1
Montana	0	–	5	–	0	4	–	5	–	1
$ – Conference champion; ^ – Selected as Rose Bowl representative (USC declined); Rankings from Dickinson System

The 1928 USC Trojans football team was an American football team that represented the University of Southern California in the Pacific Coast Conference (PCC) during the 1928 college football season. In their fourth season under head coach Howard Jones, the Trojans compiled a 9–0–1 record (4–0–1 against PCC opponents), outscored opponents by a total of 267 to 59, and won the PCC championship.

The AP Poll did not exist at the time. The only contemporaneous rating system was the Dickinson System which was released on December 8, 1928. In addition to Dickinson, USC was recognized as the 1928 national champion by the Sagarin Ratings. Georgia Tech has been recognized as the national champion by the majority of later selectors.

Three USC players received honors on the 1928 All-America college football team: tackle Jesse Hibbs (first-team selection by Central Press Association and Newspaper Enterprise Association), center Nate Barragar (second-team selection by the Associated Press); and quarterback Don Williams (second-team selection by the North American Newspaper Alliance). Four USC players received first-team honors on the 1928 All-Pacific Coast football team: quarterback Don Williams (NEA-1, UP-1); fullback Lloyd Thomas (AP-1, NEA-1, UP-1); end Lawrence McCaslin (NEA-1); and center Nate Barragar (AP-1).

== Schedule ==
Date	Opponent	Site	Result	Attendance	Source
September 29	Utah Agricultural*	Los Angeles Memorial Coliseum; Los Angeles, CA	W 40–12	32,000	
October 6	Oregon State	Los Angeles Memorial Coliseum; Los Angeles, CA	W 19–0	51,000	
October 13	Saint Mary's*	Los Angeles Memorial Coliseum; Los Angeles, CA	W 19–6	45,000	
October 20	at California	California Memorial Stadium; Berkeley, CA	T 0–0	74,245–80,000	
October 27	Occidental*	Los Angeles Memorial Coliseum; Los Angeles, CA	W 19–0	40,000	
November 3	Stanford	Los Angeles Memorial Coliseum; Los Angeles, CA (rivalry)	W 10–0	80,000	
November 10	Arizona*	Los Angeles Memorial Coliseum; Los Angeles, CA	W 78–7	20,000	
November 17	Washington State	Los Angeles Memorial Coliseum; Los Angeles, CA	W 27–13	50,000	
November 24	Idaho	Los Angeles Memorial Coliseum; Los Angeles, CA	W 28–7	10,000	
December 1	Notre Dame*^{†}	Los Angeles Memorial Coliseum; Los Angeles, CA (rivalry)	W 27–14	72,632	
*Non-conference game; ^{†}Homecoming

== Roster ==
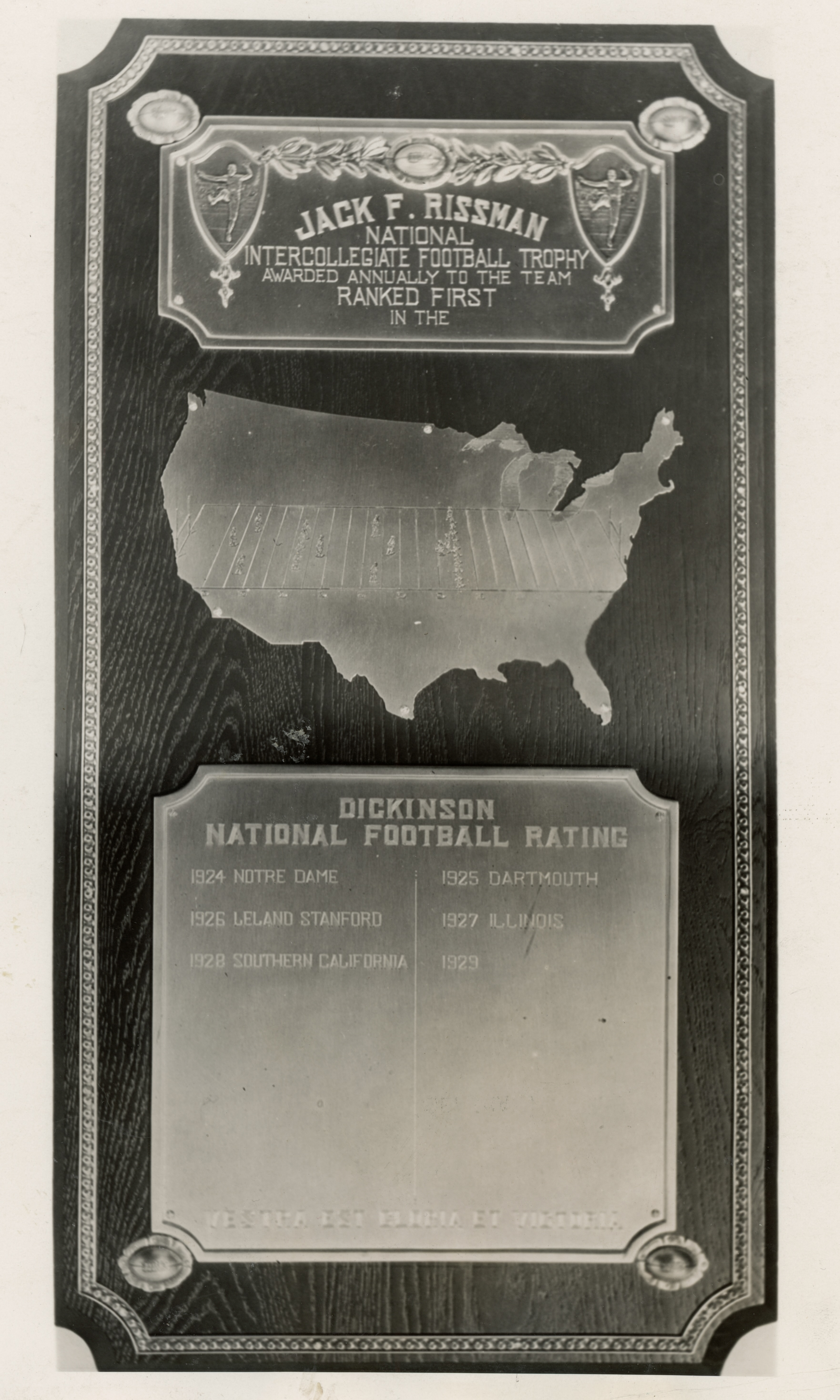
Jack F. Rissman National Intercollegiate Football Trophy — Awarded annually to the team ranked first in the Dickinson National Football Rating

- Frank Anthony, T
- Marger Apsit, HB
- Lyle Baldridge, G
- Nate Barragar, C
- Ward Bond, T
- Herschel Bonham, FB
- Charles F. Boren, G
- Everett Brown, QB
- Mahlon Chambers, QB
- Vaughn Deranian, G
- Marshall Duffield, QB
- Harvey Durkee, E
- Harry Edelson, HB
- William Ford, FB
- Clark Galloway, G
- Robert Gowder, G
- Jesse Hibbs, T
- Jess Hill, FB
- Cecil Wayne Hoff, T
- Rockwell Kemp, QB
- William Karl Kreiger, E
- Eugene Laisne, HB
- Hilton McCabe, C
- Lawrence McCaslin, E
- Jess Mortensen, HB
- Don Moses, FB
- Francis Norton, HB
- John Porter, G
- Bert Ritchey, FB
- Russ Saunders, FB
- Alvin Schaub, HB
- William Seitz, T
- Jesse Shaw, T
- Tony Steponovich, E
- Francis Tappaan, E
- George Templeton, C
- Lloyd Thomas, HB
- James Truher, E
- John Ward, T
- Ralph O. Wilcox, E
- Thomas Wilcox, FB
- Don Williams, QB
- John Irving Winfield, G
