= 1928 Montana Grizzlies football team =

American college football season

1928 Montana Grizzlies football
- Conference: Pacific Coast Conference
- Record: 4–5–1 (0–5 PCC)
- Head coach: Frank W. Milburn (3rd season)
- Home stadium: Dornblaser Field

1928 Pacific Coast Conference football standings
| | Conf. | | | | | Overall |
| Team | W | | L | | T | W | | L | | T |
|---|---|---|---|---|---|---|---|---|---|---|
| No. 1 USC $ | 4 | – | 0 | – | 1 | 9 | – | 0 | – | 1 |
| No. 2 California ^ | 3 | – | 0 | – | 2 | 6 | – | 2 | – | 2 |
| No. 4 Stanford | 4 | – | 1 | – | 1 | 8 | – | 3 | – | 1 |
| Oregon | 4 | – | 2 | – | 0 | 9 | – | 2 | – | 0 |
| Washington State | 4 | – | 3 | – | 0 | 7 | – | 3 | – | 0 |
| Oregon State | 2 | – | 3 | – | 0 | 6 | – | 3 | – | 0 |
| Idaho | 2 | – | 3 | – | 0 | 3 | – | 4 | – | 1 |
| Washington | 2 | – | 4 | – | 0 | 7 | – | 4 | – | 0 |
| UCLA | 0 | – | 4 | – | 0 | 4 | – | 4 | – | 1 |
| Montana | 0 | – | 5 | – | 0 | 4 | – | 5 | – | 1 |
$ – Conference champion; ^ – Selected as Rose Bowl representative (USC declined); Rankings from Dickinson System

The 1928 Montana Grizzlies football team represented the University of Montana in the 1928 college football season as a member of the Pacific Coast Conference (PCC). The Grizzlies were led by third-year head coach Frank W. Milburn, played their home games at Dornblaser Field and finished the season with a record of four wins, five losses and one tie (4–5–1, 0–5 PCC).

== Schedule ==
| Date | Opponent | Site | Result | Attendance | Source |
|---|---|---|---|---|---|
| September 29 | Anaconda Anodes* | Dornblaser Field; Missoula, MT | W 13–0 | | |
| September 29 | Butte Centervilles* | Dornblaser Field; Missoula, MT | W 13–0 | | |
| October 6 | Washington State | Dornblaser Field; Missoula, MT | L 6–26 | 6,000 | |
| October 13 | at Washington | Husky Stadium; Seattle, WA | L 0–25 | 11,058 | |
| October 20 | Montana Tech* | Dornblaser Field; Missoula, MT | W 20–0 | | |
| October 27 | vs. Montana State* | Clark Park; Butte, MT (rivalry) | T 0–0 | 7,000 | |
| November 3 | at Oregon State | Bell Field; Corvallis, OR | L 0–44 | | |
| November 17 | Idaho | Dornblaser Field; Missoula, MT (rivalry) | L 7–21 | | |
| November 24 | at Oregon | Hayward Field; Eugene, OR | L 6–31 | | |
| November 29 | at Gonzaga* | Gonzaga Stadium; Spokane, WA | W 7–0 | | |
*Non-conference game
