= 1928 Oregon Webfoots football team =

American college football season

1928 Oregon Webfoots football
- Conference: Pacific Coast Conference
- Record: 9–2 (4–2 PCC)
- Head coach: John McEwan (3rd season)
- Captain: George Burnell
- Home stadium: Hayward Field

1928 Pacific Coast Conference football standings
| | Conf. | | | | | Overall |
| Team | W | | L | | T | W | | L | | T |
|---|---|---|---|---|---|---|---|---|---|---|
| No. 1 USC $ | 4 | – | 0 | – | 1 | 9 | – | 0 | – | 1 |
| No. 2 California ^ | 3 | – | 0 | – | 2 | 6 | – | 2 | – | 2 |
| No. 4 Stanford | 4 | – | 1 | – | 1 | 8 | – | 3 | – | 1 |
| Oregon | 4 | – | 2 | – | 0 | 9 | – | 2 | – | 0 |
| Washington State | 4 | – | 3 | – | 0 | 7 | – | 3 | – | 0 |
| Oregon State | 2 | – | 3 | – | 0 | 6 | – | 3 | – | 0 |
| Idaho | 2 | – | 3 | – | 0 | 3 | – | 4 | – | 1 |
| Washington | 2 | – | 4 | – | 0 | 7 | – | 4 | – | 0 |
| UCLA | 0 | – | 4 | – | 0 | 4 | – | 4 | – | 1 |
| Montana | 0 | – | 5 | – | 0 | 4 | – | 5 | – | 1 |
$ – Conference champion; ^ – Selected as Rose Bowl representative (USC declined); Rankings from Dickinson System

The 1928 Oregon Webfoots football team represented the University of Oregon in the Pacific Coast Conference (PCC) during the 1928 college football season. In their third season under head coach John McEwan, the Webfoots compiled a 9–2 record (4–2 against PCC opponents), finished in fourth place in the PCC, and outscored their opponents, 234 to 59. The team played its home games at Hayward Field in Eugene, Oregon.

== Schedule ==
| Date | Opponent | Site | Result | Attendance | Source |
|---|---|---|---|---|---|
| September 29 | Pacific (OR)* | Hayward Field; Eugene, OR | W 45–0 | | |
| October 6 | Stanford | Hayward Field; Eugene, OR | L 12–26 | | |
| October 13 | at Willamette* | Sweetland Field; Salem, OR | W 38–6 | | |
| October 20 | Washington | Multnomah Stadium; Portland, OR (rivalry) | W 27–0 | 27,820 | |
| October 27 | Oregon Normal* | Hayward Field; Eugene, OR | W 26–0 | | |
| November 3 | at California | California Memorial Stadium; Berkeley, CA | L 0–13 | | |
| November 17 | at Oregon State | Bell Field; Corvallis, OR (rivalry) | W 12–0 | 22,000 | |
| November 24 | Montana | Hayward Field; Eugene, OR | W 31–6 | | |
| November 29 | at UCLA | Los Angeles Memorial Coliseum; Los Angeles, CA | W 26–6 | 35,000 | |
| December 25 | at Hawaii All-Stars* | Honolulu Stadium; Honolulu, Territory of Hawaii | W 13–2 | | |
| January 1, 1929 | at Hawaii* | Honolulu Stadium; Honolulu, Territory of Hawaii | W 6–0 | 10,000 | |
*Non-conference game
