= 1928 Washington Huskies football team =

American college football season

1928 Washington Huskies football
- Conference: Pacific Coast Conference
- Record: 7–4 (2–4 PCC)
- Head coach: Enoch Bagshaw (8th season)
- Captain: Clarence Dirks
- Home stadium: University of Washington Stadium

Uniform
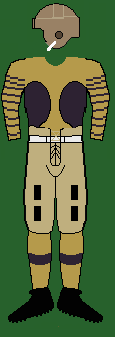

1928 Pacific Coast Conference football standings
	Conf.					Overall
Team	W		L		T	W		L		T
No. 1 USC $	4	–	0	–	1	9	–	0	–	1
No. 2 California ^	3	–	0	–	2	6	–	2	–	2
No. 4 Stanford	4	–	1	–	1	8	–	3	–	1
Oregon	4	–	2	–	0	9	–	2	–	0
Washington State	4	–	3	–	0	7	–	3	–	0
Oregon State	2	–	3	–	0	6	–	3	–	0
Idaho	2	–	3	–	0	3	–	4	–	1
Washington	2	–	4	–	0	7	–	4	–	0
UCLA	0	–	4	–	0	4	–	4	–	1
Montana	0	–	5	–	0	4	–	5	–	1
$ – Conference champion; ^ – Selected as Rose Bowl representative (USC declined); Rankings from Dickinson System

The 1928 Washington Huskies football team was an American football team that represented the University of Washington during the 1928 college football season. In its eighth season under head coach Enoch Bagshaw, the team compiled a 7–4 record, finished in eighth place in the Pacific Coast Conference, and outscored all opponents by a combined total of 188 to 74. Clarence Dirks was the team captain.

== Schedule ==
Date	Opponent	Site	Result	Attendance	Source
September 29	Willamette*	University of Washington Stadium; Seattle, WA	W 26–0	3,100	
September 29	USS Tennessee*	University of Washington Stadium; Seattle, WA	W 41–0	3,100	
October 5	Pacific (OR)*	University of Washington Stadium; Seattle, WA	W 43–0	3,500	
October 6	Whitman*	University of Washington Stadium; Seattle, WA	W 7–0	3,103	
October 13	Montana	University of Washington Stadium; Seattle, WA	W 25–0	11,058	
October 20	at Oregon	Multnomah Stadium; Portland, OR (rivalry)	L 0–27	27,820	
October 27	Oregon State	University of Washington Stadium; Seattle, WA	L 0–29	16,201	
November 3	at Puget Sound*	Tacoma Stadium; Tacoma, WA	W 40–0	15,000	
November 10	California	University of Washington Stadium; Seattle, WA	L 0–6	20,000	
November 17	at Stanford	Stanford Stadium; Stanford, CA	L 0–12	20,000	
November 29	Washington State	University of Washington Stadium; Seattle, WA (rivalry)	W 6–0	30,000	
*Non-conference game
