= 1928 Oregon State Beavers football team =

American college football season

1928 Oregon State Beavers football
- Conference: Pacific Coast Conference
- Record: 6–3 (2–3 PCC)
- Head coach: Paul J. Schissler (5th season)
- Captain: None
- Home stadium: Bell Field

1928 Pacific Coast Conference football standings
	Conf.					Overall
Team	W		L		T	W		L		T
No. 1 USC $	4	–	0	–	1	9	–	0	–	1
No. 2 California ^	3	–	0	–	2	6	–	2	–	2
No. 4 Stanford	4	–	1	–	1	8	–	3	–	1
Oregon	4	–	2	–	0	9	–	2	–	0
Washington State	4	–	3	–	0	7	–	3	–	0
Oregon State	2	–	3	–	0	6	–	3	–	0
Idaho	2	–	3	–	0	3	–	4	–	1
Washington	2	–	4	–	0	7	–	4	–	0
UCLA	0	–	4	–	0	4	–	4	–	1
Montana	0	–	5	–	0	4	–	5	–	1
$ – Conference champion; ^ – Selected as Rose Bowl representative (USC declined); Rankings from Dickinson System

The 1928 Oregon State Beavers football team represented Oregon State University in the Pacific Coast Conference (PCC) during the 1928 college football season. In their fifth season under head coach Paul J. Schissler, the Beavers compiled a 6–3 record (2–3 in PCC, sixth) and outscored their opponents 206 to 53. Under coach Schissler, from 1925 to 1932, no team captains were elected. The team played its home games on campus at Bell Field in Corvallis, Oregon.

== Schedule ==
Date	Opponent	Site	Result	Attendance	Source
September 29	Cal Aggies*	Bell Field; Corvallis, OR	W 14–0		
October 6	at USC	Los Angeles Memorial Coliseum; Los Angeles, CA	L 0–19	51,000	
October 13	vs. Columbia (OR)*	Multnomah Field; Portland, OR	W 41–0		
October 13	vs. Pacific (OR)*	Multnomah Field; Portland, OR	W 46–0		
October 20	at Washington State	Rogers Field; Pullman, WA	L 7–9	10,000	
October 27	at Washington	Husky Stadium; Seattle, WA	W 29–0	16,201	
November 3	Montana	Bell Field; Corvallis, OR	W 44–0		
November 17	Oregon	Bell Field; Corvallis, OR (rivalry)	L 0–12	22,000	
November 29	at NYU*	Yankee Stadium; Bronx, NY	W 25–13	40,000	
*Non-conference game
