= 1928 Stanford football team =

American college football season

1928 Stanford football
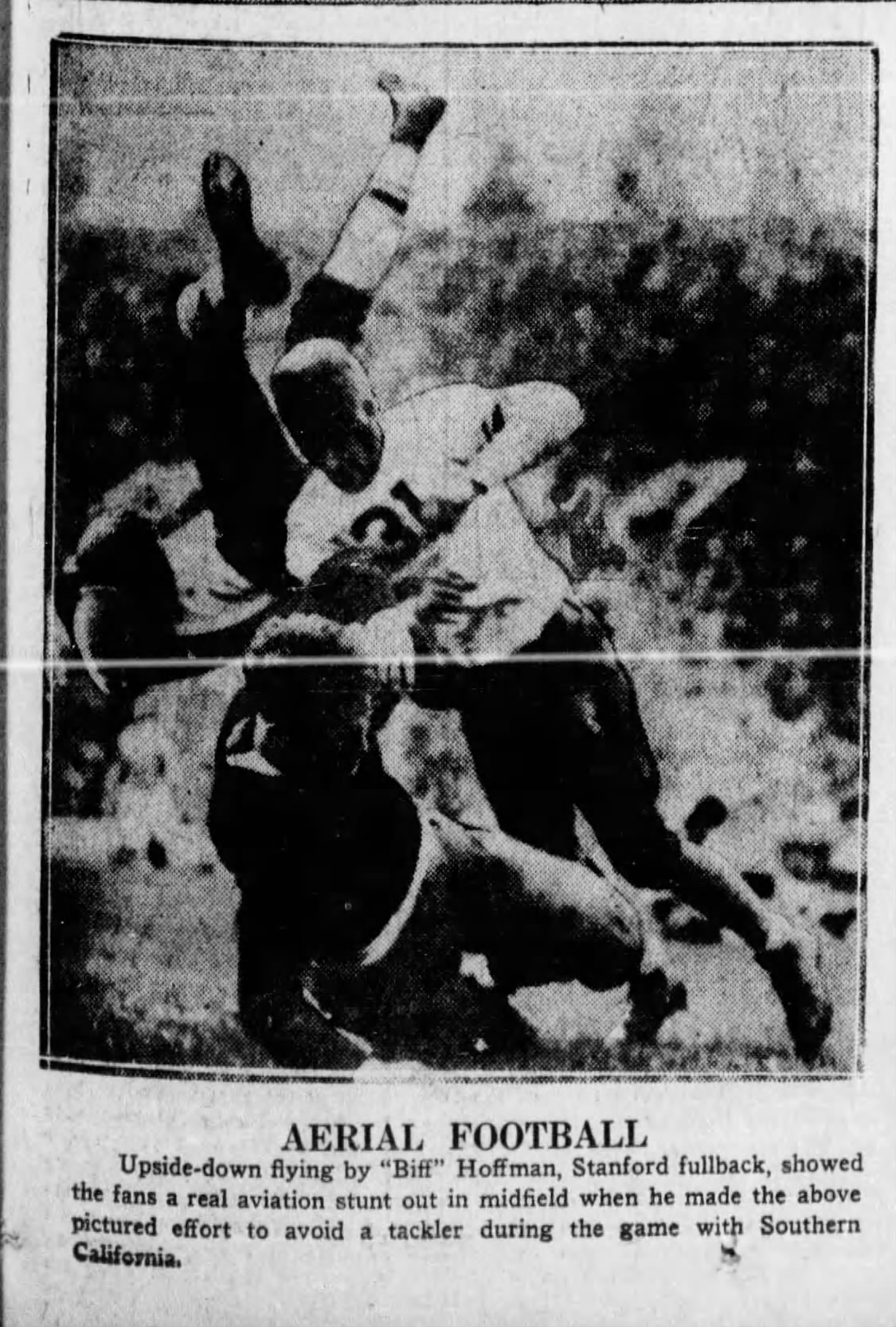
- Photograph taken from the November 3, 1928 football game between Stanford University and the University of Southern California.
- Conference: Pacific Coast Conference
- Record: 8–3–1 (4–1–1 PCC)
- Head coach: Pop Warner (5th season)
- Offensive scheme: Double-wing
- Home stadium: Stanford Stadium

1928 Pacific Coast Conference football standings
	Conf.					Overall
Team	W		L		T	W		L		T
No. 1 USC $	4	–	0	–	1	9	–	0	–	1
No. 2 California ^	3	–	0	–	2	6	–	2	–	2
No. 4 Stanford	4	–	1	–	1	8	–	3	–	1
Oregon	4	–	2	–	0	9	–	2	–	0
Washington State	4	–	3	–	0	7	–	3	–	0
Oregon State	2	–	3	–	0	6	–	3	–	0
Idaho	2	–	3	–	0	3	–	4	–	1
Washington	2	–	4	–	0	7	–	4	–	0
UCLA	0	–	4	–	0	4	–	4	–	1
Montana	0	–	5	–	0	4	–	5	–	1
$ – Conference champion; ^ – Selected as Rose Bowl representative (USC declined); Rankings from Dickinson System

The 1928 Stanford football team represented Stanford University in the 1928 college football season. Under fifth-year head coach Pop Warner, Stanford played its home games on campus at Stanford Stadium and were members of the Pacific Coast Conference. The team was ranked No. 4 in the nation in the Dickinson System ratings released in December 1928.

After playing in the Rose Bowl for the last two seasons, and three of the last four, Stanford did not play a postseason game, but did end its season on a high note with a shutout over Army before 86,000 at Yankee Stadium.

== Schedule ==
Date	Opponent	Site	Result	Attendance	Source
September 22	Young Men's Institute*	Stanford Stadium; Stanford, CA	L 0–7	50,000	
September 22	West Coast Army*	Stanford Stadium; Stanford, CA	W 21–8	50,000	
September 29	Olympic Club*	Stanford Stadium; Stanford, CA	L 6–12		
October 6	at Oregon	Hayward Field; Eugene, OR	W 26–12		
October 13	UCLA	Stanford Stadium; Stanford, CA	W 45–7		
October 20	vs. Idaho	Kezar Stadium; San Francisco, CA	W 47–0	19,000	
October 27	Fresno State*	Stanford Stadium; Stanford, CA	W 47–0		
November 3	at USC	Los Angeles Memorial Coliseum; Los Angeles, CA (rivalry)	L 0–10	80,000	
November 10	Santa Clara*	Stanford Stadium; Stanford, CA	W 31–0	15,000	
November 17	Washington	Stanford Stadium; Stanford, CA	W 12–0	20,000	
November 24	at California	California Memorial Stadium; Berkeley, CA (Big Game)	T 13–13	90,000	
December 1	vs. Army*	Yankee Stadium; Bronx, NY	W 26–0	86,000	
*Non-conference game
