= 1928 Washington State Cougars football team =

American college football season

1928 Washington State Cougars football
- Conference: Pacific Coast Conference
- Record: 7–3 (4–3 PCC)
- Head coach: Babe Hollingbery (3rd season)
- Captain: Mel Dressel
- Home stadium: Rogers Field

1928 Pacific Coast Conference football standings
	Conf.					Overall
Team	W		L		T	W		L		T
No. 1 USC $	4	–	0	–	1	9	–	0	–	1
No. 2 California ^	3	–	0	–	2	6	–	2	–	2
No. 4 Stanford	4	–	1	–	1	8	–	3	–	1
Oregon	4	–	2	–	0	9	–	2	–	0
Washington State	4	–	3	–	0	7	–	3	–	0
Oregon State	2	–	3	–	0	6	–	3	–	0
Idaho	2	–	3	–	0	3	–	4	–	1
Washington	2	–	4	–	0	7	–	4	–	0
UCLA	0	–	4	–	0	4	–	4	–	1
Montana	0	–	5	–	0	4	–	5	–	1
$ – Conference champion; ^ – Selected as Rose Bowl representative (USC declined); Rankings from Dickinson System

The 1928 Washington State Cougars football team was an American football team that represented Washington State College during the 1928 college football season. Head coach Babe Hollingbery led the team to a 4–3 mark in the PCC and 7–3 overall.

== Schedule ==
Date	Opponent	Site	Result	Attendance	Source
September 22	Whitman*	Rogers Field; Pullman, WA	W 33–6	4,000	
September 29	at Gonzaga*	Gonzaga Stadium; Spokane, WA	W 3–0	10,000	
October 6	at Montana	Dornblaser Field; Missoula, NT	W 26–6	6,000	
October 13	at California	California Memorial Stadium; Berkeley, CA	L 3–13	30,000	
October 20	Oregon State	Rogers Field; Pullman, WA	W 9–7	10,000	
October 27	College of Idaho*	Rogers Field; Pullman, WA	W 51–0	5,000	
November 3	at Idaho	MacLean Field; Moscow, ID (rivalry)	W 26–0	10,000	
November 10	vs. UCLA	Multnomah Stadium; Portland, OR	W 38–0	1,000	
November 17	at USC	Los Angeles Memorial Coliseum; Los Angeles, CA	L 13–27	50,000	
November 29	at Washington	Husky Stadium; Seattle, WA (rivalry)	L 0–6	30,000	
*Non-conference game
