= Roy Riegels =

American college football player (1908–1993)

- Riegels during the 1929 Rose Bowl

No. 11
- Position: Center

Personal information
- Born: April 4, 1908; Oakland, California, U.S.
- Died: March 26, 1993 (aged 84); Woodland, California, U.S.
- Listed weight: 165 lb (75 kg)

Career information
- High school: Paramount (Paramount, California)
- College: California (1927–1929)

Awards and highlights
- First-team All-American (1929); First-team All-PCC (1929)

Roy Riegels (April 4, 1908 – March 26, 1993) was an American college football center who played for the California Golden Bears from 1927 to 1929. Riegels was nicknamed "Wrong Way" due to his infamous wrong-way run in the 1929 Rose Bowl, which is often cited as the worst blunder in the history of college football. That one play overshadowed Riegels' football talents; he earned first-team All-America honors and served as team captain for the Golden Bears in 1929. Riegels' notability has been shared by motivational speakers who use his life as an example of overcoming setbacks.

== Background ==
The 1920s saw the first golden age of Cal football. The Golden Bears went 50 straight games without a defeat, from 1920 to 1925, with a record of 46 wins and 4 ties. As of 2010, this is the 3rd longest unbeaten (not to be confused with winning) streak in NCAA history. The 1920–1924 squads were so dominant that they were nicknamed "The Wonder Teams," and were coached by Andy Smith. One of the stars during this era was Brick Muller and the university later established a freshman leadership group called the Brick Muller Society. Cal won four Pacific Coast Conference championships and made three trips to the Rose Bowl during this decade, in 1921 (28–0 win over Ohio State), 1922 (0–0 tie with Washington & Jefferson), and 1929 (8–7 loss to Georgia Tech).

Riegels played center on the 1928 California Golden Bears football team, which had a 6–1–2 record going into the Rose Bowl game. Riegels led the Golden Bears in conference minutes played that season, and he was voted onto the All-Coast team. He was a good blocker, but his strength was playing "roving center" on defense, similar to the present-day middle linebacker position. Cal's coach, Nibs Price, credited Riegels as the smartest player he ever coached. Cal's Rose Bowl opponent, the Georgia Tech Yellow Jackets, were undefeated and had outscored their opponents 213 points to 40 after nine games played. The Rose Bowl game was broadcast nationally by radio.

== The game ==
On January 1, 1929, the Golden Bears faced the Georgia Tech Yellow Jackets at the Rose Bowl in Pasadena, California, USA. Midway through the second quarter, Riegels, who played center on both offensive and defensive lines and who was then playing in a role similar to that of the modern defensive nose guard or nose tackle, picked up a fumble by Tech's Jack "Stumpy" Thomason. Just 30 yards away from the Yellow Jackets' end zone, Riegels was somehow turned around and ran 69 yards in the wrong direction. The following describes what transpired from Riegels perspective:

I was running toward the sidelines when I picked up the ball," Riegels told The Associated Press. "I started to turn to my left toward Tech's goal. Somebody shoved me and I bounded right off into a tackler. In pivoting to get away from him, I completely lost my bearings.

— Roy Riegels

Teammate and quarterback Benny Lom chased Riegels, screaming at him to stop. Known for his speed, Lom finally caught up with Riegels at California's 3-yard line and tried to turn him around, but he was immediately hit and piled on by a wave of Georgia Tech players who tackled and then threw him over the goal-line. The referee called the ball down at the place where Riegels had been stopped by his teammate. The Bears chose to punt rather than risk a play so close to their own end zone, but Georgia Tech's Vance Maree blocked Lom's punt which, after a mad scramble, was recovered by Georgia Tech for a safety, giving the Yellow Jackets a 2–0 lead.

During Riegels' wrong-way run, Georgia Tech coach Bill Alexander told his excited players, who were jumping up and down near the Tech bench, "Sit down. Sit down. He's just running the wrong way. Every step he takes is to our advantage." Broadcaster Graham McNamee, who was calling the game for NBC radio, said during Riegels' wrong-way run, "What am I seeing? What's wrong with me? Am I crazy? Am I crazy? Am I crazy?" After the play, Riegels was so distraught that he had to be talked into returning to the game by coach Nibs Price for the second half. Roy said "Coach, I can't do it. I've ruined you, I've ruined myself, I've ruined the University of California. I couldn't face that crowd to save my life." Coach Price responded by saying "Roy, get up and go back out there — the game is only half-over."

Riegels did return to play, and he turned in a stellar second half performance that included blocking a Georgia Tech punt. In addition, Lom passed for a touchdown and kicked the extra point, but that was not enough. Georgia Tech would ultimately win the game, and their second national championship, 8–7. In spite of the loss, the example of how the distraught Riegels was persuaded to pick himself up, return to the field and play so hard during the second half is sometimes used by motivational speakers to illustrate overcoming setbacks.

== Aftermath ==
After the game, coach Nibs Price defended Riegels, saying, "It was an accident that might have happened to anyone." That one play overshadowed Riegels' football talents. Georgia Tech center and captain Peter Pund said Riegels was "the best center I have played against all year. He's a battler and he never quit." Riegels would take his spot as team captain during his senior year, earning All-America honors, and he helped the Bears to a 7–1–1 record during the following season. Later, the NCAA football rules committee would pass a rule barring a player from advancing a recovered fumble once it hits the ground, which remained in place for several decades. According to one contemporary article, there were about 4,500 stories totaling an estimated 250,000 column inches written about Riegels' wrong-way run in newspapers across the United States.

Riegels parodied his famous run in vaudeville acts. The opening sequence of the 1929 Frank Capra movie Flight is based on Riegels and uses photographs of him. In 1965, the movie John Goldfarb, Please Come Home! was released and the lead character performs a similar blunder in his college years, earning the name "Wrong Way" Goldfarb. In 2011, a picture book written by Dan Gutman was published with title "The Day Roy Riegels Ran the Wrong Way," which provides play-by-play description of this moment in sports history.

Looking back on the play years later, Riegels said, "I was embarrassed when I realized what I had done. I wanted a hole to open in the ground so I could jump in it. But that soon passed and I reached a stage when mention of it would cause me to bristle. Soon that passed and it has never really bothered me since, except in cases when people tried to exploit it." Riegels was reminded of his mistake throughout his life. Riegels once said: "All the times I've run across or heard people saying 'wrong way,' even though they weren't referring to me, I immediately turned around to see if they were speaking about me. I still don't understand how I did it." Riegels dealt with his situation by laughing about what happened. Riegels once joked "If I had to do it again, I'd still run in the same direction, for I surely thought I was going the right way." Riegels also said "You run the wrong way with a football in front of 60,000 people and it's pretty hard to lie out of it." When presented with his membership card into the Georgia Tech Lettermen's Club 42 years later, Riegels quipped, "Believe me, I feel I've earned this."

External images
- Diagram of the play
- With his teammates

Riegels sent letters to athletes who made similar mistakes. For example, Riegels sent a letter to Paramount High School's Jan Bandringa in 1957, who had intercepted a pass only to run it 55 yards into his own end zone, resulting in a safety for Centennial High, who won the game 9–7. Riegels wrote in the letter: "For many years I've had to go along and laugh whenever my wrong-way run was brought up, even though I've grown tired listening and reading about it. But it certainly wasn't the most serious thing in the world. I regretted doing it, even as you do but you'll get over it." In addition, during an NFL game in 1964 between the Minnesota Vikings and San Francisco 49ers, Minnesota defensive end Jim Marshall ran a recovered fumble 66 yards into his own end zone (resulting in a safety but the Vikings won 27–22). Riegels reportedly later sent Marshall a letter reading "Welcome to the club".

In later years, Riegels said his blunder made him a better person. "I gained true understanding of life from my Rose Bowl mistake," he said in an interview with the Pasadena Star. "I learned you can bounce back from misfortune and view it as just something adverse that happened to you."

In 1991, Riegels was inducted into the Rose Bowl Hall of Fame. He was posthumously elected to Cal's Hall of Fame in 1998. In 2003, a panel from the College Football Hall of Fame and CBS Sports chose Riegels' "Wrong way run in the Rose Bowl" one of six "Most Memorable Moments of the Century."

== Family and personal life ==
Riegels was born to Max Jakob Andreas Riegels and Beda Helena Nilsdotter. His father was from Denmark and his mother was from Sweden. Riegels had 2 sisters named Elsie and Dora and a brother named William. He was married to Barbara Bailey (1916–1985). Riegels had four children: David, Richard, Alexa Richmond, and Helen Mackey.

Riegels graduated from the University of California in 1931 with a degree in agriculture. Riegels became a teacher and coached football at California and at the high school and junior college levels where his players often ran the wrong way during practice. He served as an officer in the United States Army Air Corps during World War II and later worked in the agriculture field and as a cannery executive. In 1955, Riegels started his own agricultural chemicals dealership in Woodland, California, Roy Riegels Chemicals, earning plaudits for his contributions to California farming from the state legislature and governor. Riegels sold the company and retired in 1976. He died in March 1993 in his sleep at his home at the age of 84 due to complications from Parkinson's disease.
