= Nibs Price =

American football and basketball coach (1889–1968)

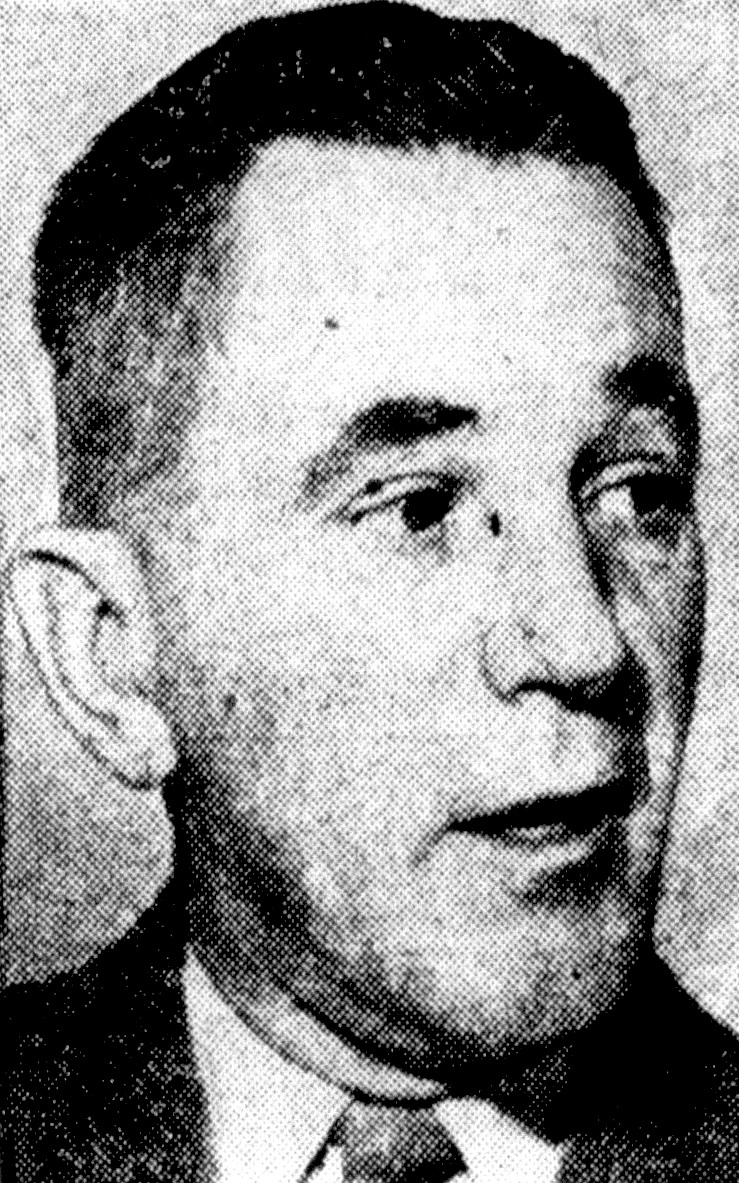
- Price in 1951

Biographical details
- Born: April 26, 1889; Minnesota, U.S.
- Died: January 13, 1968 (aged 78); Oakland, California, U.S.

Coaching career (HC unless noted)

Basketball
- 1924–1954: California

Football
- 1916–1917: San Diego HS (CA)
- 1919: California (freshmen)
- 1920–1925: California (assistant)
- 1926–1930: California
- 1931–1954: California (assistant)

Head coaching record
- Overall: 453–294 (college basketball); 27–17–3 (college football)
- Bowls: 0–1

Accomplishments and honors

Championships
- Football; 1 PCC (1929)

Clarence Merle "Nibs" Price (April 26, 1889 – January 13, 1968) was an American basketball and football coach. After coaching at San Diego High School, he served as the head football coach at the University of California, Berkeley from 1926 to 1930, compiling the a record of 27–17–3, and the head men's basketball coach at Berkeley from 1924 to 1954, tallying a mark of 453–294. He led the 1946 basketball team to the Final Four. Succeeding Andy Smith as Cal's football coach, Price guided the Golden Bears to the 1929 Rose Bowl, a game infamous for Roy Riegels's wrong-way run. His 1926–27 basketball team finished the season with a 17–0 record and was retroactively named the top team of the season by the Premo-Porretta Power Poll. Price died on January 13, 1968, at the age of 77 in Oakland, California.

== Head coaching record ==
=== College football ===
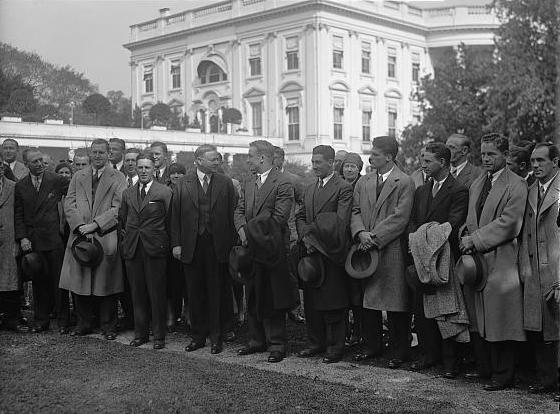
The 1929 California Golden Bears football team was invited to the White House during their October trip to play at Penn. Price and U.S. president Herbert Hoover are in the center looking on another.

Year	Team	Overall	Conference	Standing	Bowl/playoffs
California Golden Bears (Pacific Coast Conference) (1926–1930)
1926	California	3–6	0–5	9th	
1927	California	7–3	2–3	T–5th	
1928	California	6–2–2	3–0–2	2nd	L Rose
1929	California	7–1–1	4–1	T–1st	
1930	California	4–5	1–4	T–8th	
California:		27–17–3	10–13–2		
Total:		27–17–3			
National championship Conference title Conference division title or championship game berth

=== College basketball ===
Record table
Season	Team	Overall	Conference	Standing	Postseason
California Golden Bears (Pacific Coast Conference) (1924–1954)
1924–25	California	11–4	3–1	1st	
1925–26	California	14–0	5–0	1st	
1926–27	California	17–0	5–0	1st	
1927–28	California	9–6	6–3	2nd	
1928–29	California	17–3	9–0	1st	
1929–30	California	9–8	6–3	2nd	
1930–31	California	12–10	6–3	1st	
1931–32	California	16–8	8–3	1st	
1932–33	California	18–7	8–3	2nd	
1933–34	California	19–7	8–4	2nd	
1934–35	California	11–14	5–7	2nd	
1935–36	California	13–16	6–6	3rd	
1936–37	California	17–10	4–8	3rd	
1937–38	California	18–11	8–4	2nd	
1938–39	California	24–8	9–3	1st	
1939–40	California	15–17	5–7	3rd	
1940–41	California	15–12	6–6	T–2nd	
1941–42	California	11–19	4–8	3rd	
1942–43	California	9–15	1–7	4th	
1943–44	California	7–3	4–0	1st	
1944–45	California	7–8	1–3	3rd	
1945–46	California	30–6	11–1	1st	NCAA Final Four
1946–47	California	20–11	8–4	2nd	
1947–48	California	25–9	11–1	1st	
1948–49	California	14–19	1–11	4th	
1949–50	California	10–17	4–9	3rd	
1950–51	California	16–16	3–9	4th	
1951–52	California	17–13	6–6	T–2nd	
1952–53	California	15–10	9–3	1st	
1953–54	California	17–7	6–6	3rd	
California:		453–294 (.606)	176–129 (.577)		
Total:		453–294 (.606)			
National champion Postseason invitational champion Conference regular season champion Conference regular season and conference tournament champion Division regular season champion Division regular season and conference tournament champion Conference tournament champion

== See also ==
- List of NCAA Division I Men's Final Four appearances by coach
