= Benny Lom =

American football player (1906–1984)

Profile
- Position: Halfback

Personal information
- Born: June 29, 1906
- Died: July 1, 1984 (aged 78)

Career information
- College: California (1927–1929)

Awards and highlights
- Second-team All-American (1929); 2× First-team All-PCC (1928, 1929); Rose Bowl MVP (1929)

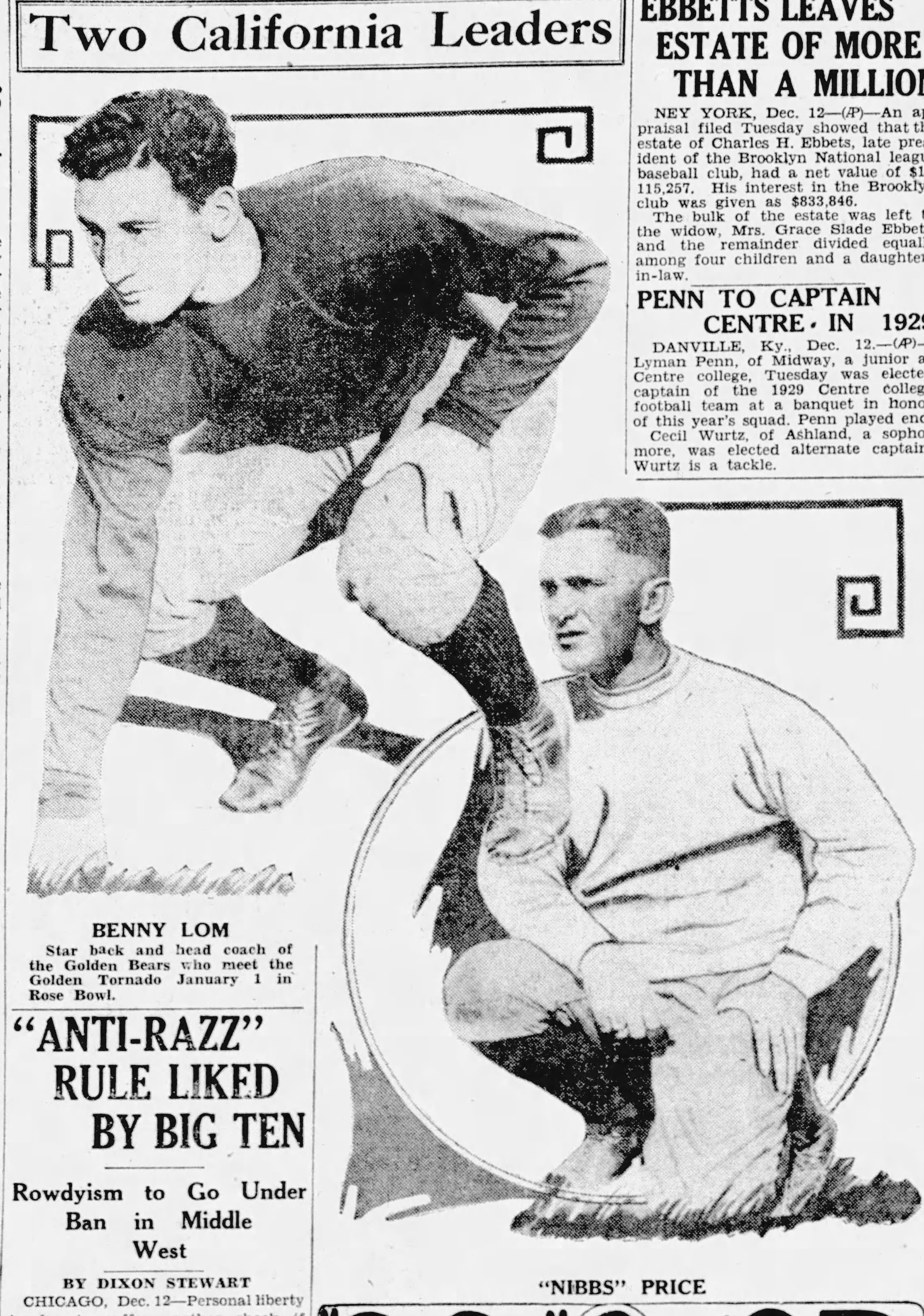
1928 photographs of California Golden Bears player Benny Lom and head coach Nibs Price.

Benjamin Lom (June 29, 1906 – July 1, 1984) was an American college football player who played for three seasons for the University of California, Berkeley Golden Bears, and was best known for his attempt to stop his own teammate Roy Riegels after Riegels ran the ball 69 yards in the wrong direction during the 1929 Rose Bowl.

== Biography ==
=== 1927 season ===
As a sophomore in his first game with Cal, Lom threw two long forward passes to win the game. In another game that season, several of Lom's passes led Cal to a 13–0 win over Saint Mary's College of California. The team went 7–3 that season and Lom was named as an honorable mention on the Associated Press All-America team and was named as a first-team member of Lou Little's All-America team.

=== 1928 season and 1929 Rose Bowl ===
Cal finished with a 6–1–2 record in the 1928 season and faced the Georgia Tech Yellow Jackets in the 1929 Rose Bowl. In the second quarter, Lom forced a fumble by Stumpy Thomason of Georgia Tech. Lom's teammate Roy Riegels picked up the ball at the Georgia Tech 35-yard line and headed for a touchdown but reversed direction after spinning to avoid tackles and started heading towards his own goal line. Lom chased after Riegels trying to tell him to turn around, but Riegels couldn't hear him over the roar from the crowd of 70,000. Lom ultimately caught up with Riegels at Cal's own six-inch line. The play was described at the time as follows:

"Down the field raced Riegels, the white lines passing beneath his feet, his mind concentrated upon outrunning the Georgia Tech team. Lom gradually overtook him. Once it looked as if Lom were going to make a flying tackle of his teammate, as he was within diving distance, but he evidently expected to turn Riegels around. Not until Riegels reached the 1-foot mark did Lom overtake him. Lom then pulled Riegels by the shoulders and motioned toward the opposite goal. Riegels stopped, and at that instant two Georgia Tech players tackled him and threw him over the goal-line. The referee called the ball down at the place where Riegels had been stopped by his teammate."

Recovering the ball inside their own one-yard line, the Cal Bears opted to punt on first down. Lom attempted the punt, but Lom's punt was blocked and the ball was recovered by Georgia Tech after a "mad scramble" for a safety that gave Georgia Tech a 2–0 lead.

Georgia Tech scored a touchdown in the third quarter to make it 8–0. With a little more than a minute left in the fourth quarter, Lom led Cal on a 98-yard drive to score a touchdown and kicked the extra point to bring the Bears within a point, but the safety proved to be the margin of victory for Georgia Tech. In its coverage of the game, The New York Times called Lom "the outstanding hero of the game for the losers. he played smart football, was in every play and carried the ball on sweeping end runs with dash and vigor."

Lom was retrospectively honored in 1953 with the Player of the Game Award of the 1929 Rose Bowl game, one of only two players from the losing team to be selected outright for the honor.

=== 1929 season ===
The team had a 7–1–1 record in 1929. Highlights of the season included a 54-yard kickoff return on the opening play of a game against the University of Pennsylvania that Cal won 12–7. In a November 1929 game against the heavily favored University of Southern California Trojans, Lom set up for a punt and ran the ball back for an 85-yard touchdown after a USC player trying to block the kick was blocked and two USC players were avoided near the line of scrimmage. Cal beat USC 15–7, and Lom's performance led the United Press to write:

"Standing out above all the others in the California lineup were Benny Lom, the slight Jewish halfback, and Roy Riegels .... If there ever was any doubt that Lom was a great back he proved it to-day. His long punts continually offset advantages Southern California gained through hard running plays. His passing was deadly. He ripped off long gains with disturbing frequency and finally took the game out of the disputed class by running eighty-five vards through the entire Trojan team to a touchdown, the second for the Bears."

In 1929, Lom was selected for the All-Pacific Coast first team and was selected as a third-team All-American by the Associated Press and a second-team All-American by the Newspaper Editors Association and the North American Newspaper Alliance, He was also received honorable mentions from Grantland Rice and United Press.

== International Jewish Sports Hall of Fame ==
Lom was one of ten athletes inducted in 1995 into the International Jewish Sports Hall of Fame.
