= California Golden Bears football =

University of California, Berkeley football team

2026 California Golden Bears football team
- First season: 1886; 140 years ago
- Athletic director: Jay Larson; Jenny Simon-O'Neill
- General manager: Ron Rivera
- Head coach: Tosh Lupoi; 1st season, 3–8 (.273)
- Location: Berkeley, California
- Stadium: California Memorial Stadium (capacity: 63,000)
- NCAA division: Division I FBS
- Conference: ACC
- Colors: Blue and gold
- All-time record: 708–590–51 (.544)
- Bowl record: 12–14–1 (.463)

National championships
- Claimed: 1920, 1921, 1922, 1923, 1937

Conference championships
- PCC: 1918, 1920, 1921, 1922, 1923, 1924, 1929, 1935, 1937, 1938, 1948, 1949, 1950, 1958 Pac-12: 1975, 2006
- Consensus All-Americans: 27
- Rivalries: Stanford (rivalry); UCLA (rivalry); USC (rivalry)

Uniforms
- Fight song: Fight for California
- Mascot: Oski
- Marching band: University of California Marching Band
- Outfitter: Nike
- Website: Official website

The California Golden Bears football program represents the University of California, Berkeley, in college football as a member of the Atlantic Coast Conference at the NCAA Division I FBS level. They were previously a member of the Pac-12 Conference. The team plays its home games at California Memorial Stadium in Berkeley and is coached by Tosh Lupoi. Since beginning of play in 1886, the team has won five NCAA recognized national titles —1920, 1921, 1922, 1923, 1937—and 14 conference championships, the last one in 2006. It has also produced what are considered to be two of the most memorable plays in college football: Roy "Wrong Way" Riegels' fumble recovery at the 1929 Rose Bowl and The Play kickoff return in the 1982 Big Game.

== History ==
=== 19th century ===
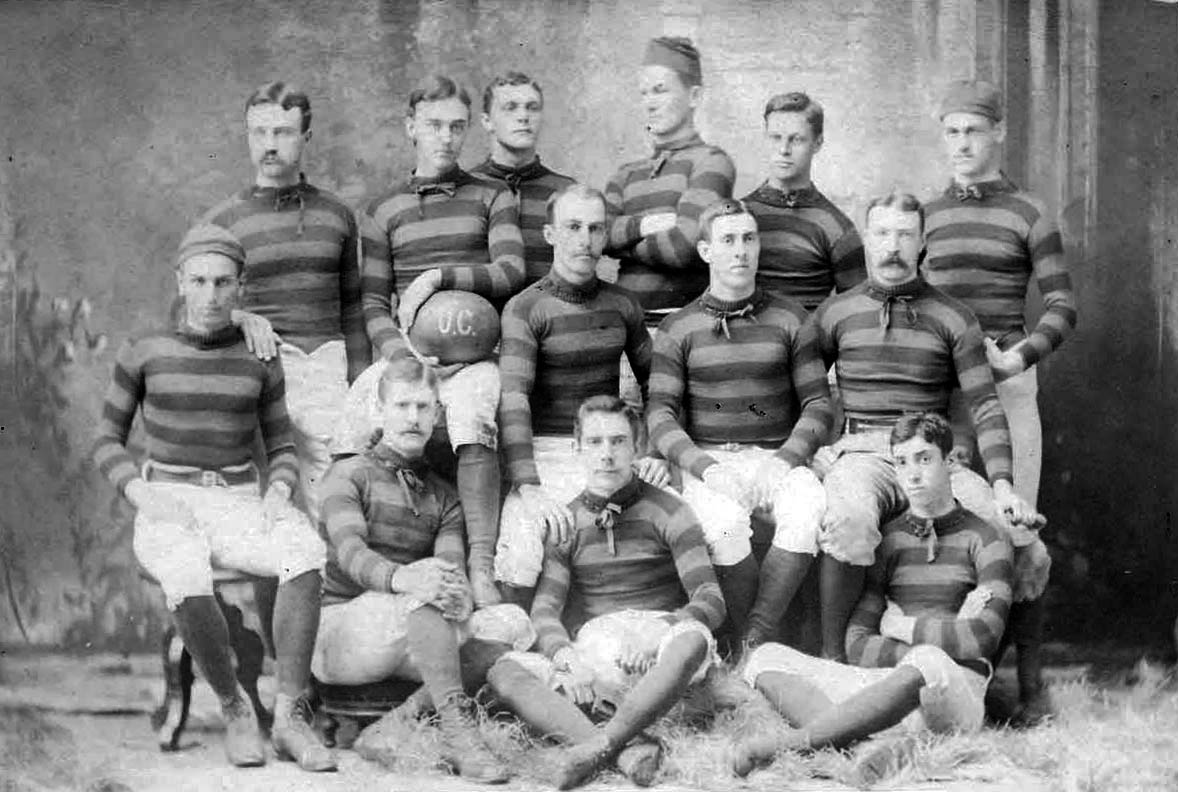
The 1886 team, one of the earliest teams fielded by the University of California

University of California fielded its first American Football team in 1882. In March 1892, the school played its first game against Stanford University, the first instance of the annual rivalry match–The Big Game, one of oldest college rivalries in the United States.

In 1899, coached by Princeton alumni Garrett Cochran, Cal played a home game against future legend Pop Warner and the emerging power of that period the Carlisle Indian Industrial School. Warner took up Cochran's challenge that his undefeated team could beat any East Coast opponent. The game took place in San Francisco on Christmas Day of that year. Even though Carlisle dominated the majority of its season's opponents, it could only beat Cal 0–2, via a second-half safety. It was after that match that Cal became considered a worthy opponent to the East Coast teams.

=== 20th century ===
The 1900 Big Game is associated with the Thanksgiving Day Disaster. The game was in San Francisco, with between 500 and 1,000 men watching the game from the rooftop of an operating glass factory next to the sold-out city stadium. During the game, more than 100 fans fell through the factory's roof with the majority falling onto the factory's massive, operational furnace. In total 22 men, mostly boys, were killed, with others severely injured.

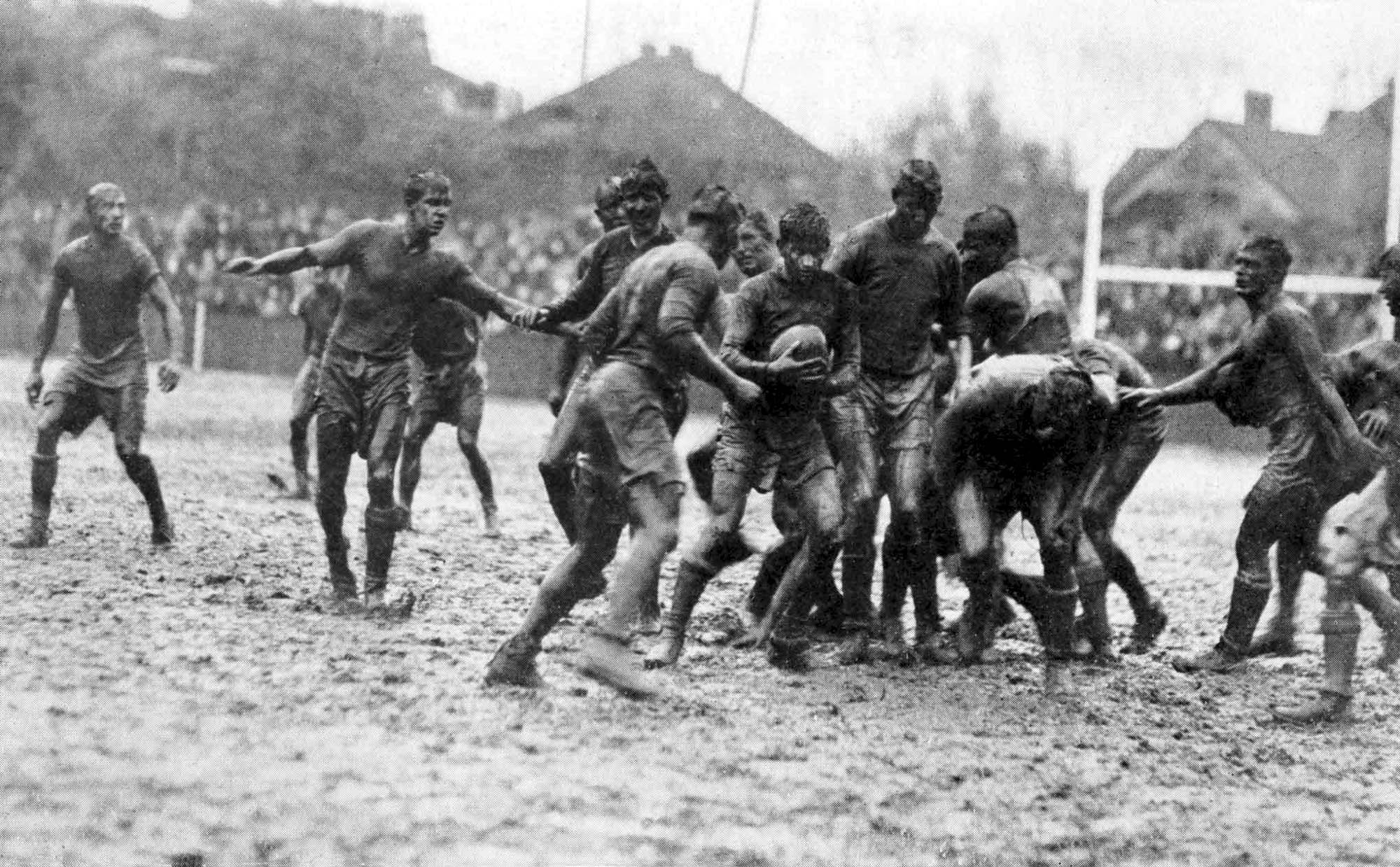
From 1906 to 1914, the Big Game was played under the rules of rugby union. The 1912 edition would be nicknamed the mud game

In 1905, there were 18 deaths reported as being caused by the play on the field. The next year, numerous rule changes were agreed upon by the majority of American schools. Berkeley, Stanford, along with other West Coast institutions decided to go in another direction, switching their primary sport to rugby, a sport they considered to be less dangerous. During those years, California wielded dominant teams, however the Bears were able to beat Stanford only three times. In 1915, due to various causes, including students frustration with those results, the university along with other West Coast teams decided to return to American football. In 1916, Cal joined the Pacific Coast Conference, which consisted of Cal, Washington, Oregon, and Oregon Agricultural (which later became Oregon State). In the same year, Andy Smith, former coach of Purdue, became Cal's head coach. In 1920, he produced the first example of what was known as The Wonder Teams.

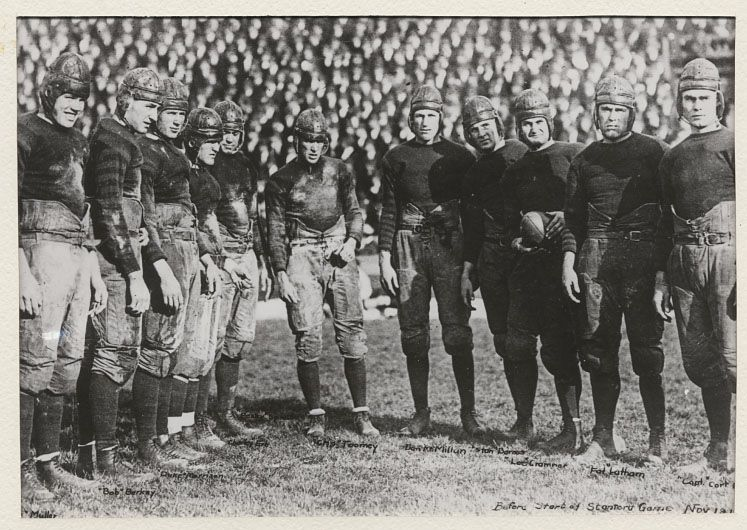
The 1920 Wonder Team

From 1920 to 1925, The Wonder Teams went 50 straight games without defeat, made three trips to the Rose Bowl, and won four NCAA recognized national titles - 1920, 1921, 1922, 1923. The California Memorial Stadium opened in 1923 and sat more than 73,000; several thousand more could watch the games from Tightwad Hill right above it. In January 1926, Andy Smith died at 42 years old, dying from pneumonia. His death was unexpected and traumatic for the team and the whole university. His overall Cal record was 74–16–7.

In 1927, Smith was succeeded by his former assistant coach Nibs Price. In 1927 and 1928 Price led the last two instances of Wonder Teams. Both teams were undefeated, with the 1928 team being invited to the 1929 Rose Bowl to play against Georgia Tech. An event in this game has become considered one of the stand-out moments in Rose Bowl history. Upon recovering a fumble, Cal's center Roy "the wrong way" Riegels inadvertently spun around, and ran the ball towards Cal's endzone instead of Georgia Tech's. Cal's quarterback was able to catch up with him right next to the endzone, where they were immediately tackled by Georgia Tech players. Price chose to punt, which was blocked for a safety, giving Georgia Tech a 2–0 lead. These turned out to be the decisive points of Cal's 8–7 loss.

In 1936 Nibs was replaced by Stub Ellison. Ellison lead Cal to three PCC championship titles, but will be most remembered for that the 1937 season's team and its virtually flawless performance. Because of its staunch defense, the 1937 squad that went to the Rose Bowl was coined "The Thunder Team." In its 11 wins, California scored 214 points and earned 7 shutouts, with its opponents could only score 33 points against it. The Thunder Team ended the season beating Alabama 13–0 in the Rose Bowl becoming that year's national champions. 1944 was Ellison's last season.

In 1947, former Northwestern coach Lynn "Pappy" Waldorf become the new head coach of Cal. During his first season the Bears went 9–1, with their only loss coming from conference champs - USC. Known as "Pappy's Boys", the Cal teams of 1947-1950 won 33 consecutive regular-season games, earning three PCC championships and three Rose Bowl berths. However, California lost all three Rose Bowls: 20–14 to Northwestern in 1949, 17–14 to Ohio State in 1950, and 14–6 to Michigan in 1951. Because of both Cal's return to greatness and Waldorf's great character, he became admired by both his players and his fans. He became known for addressing fans after every game from a balcony of the Memorial stadium. Like today, during those years a team could make multiple substitutions after every play. Waldorf was known for taking full advantage of this rule, using highly specialized players for key positions. In 1953, the league returned to its pre-World War II rules when only one substitution could be made per play. In 1953, Cal went 7–3 to 4–4–2. The 1953 season is also remembered for recruiting scandal involving star freshman quarterback Ronnie Knox, who along with his father and high school coach were promised paid positions at the university. This was discovered prior to its happening and following investigation by both administration and the PCC conference, it was found that Waldorf was not directly involved in the scandal. Waldorf did not have a winning season after that year, retiring at the end of the 1956 season. During the Waldorf era Cal went 67–32–4.

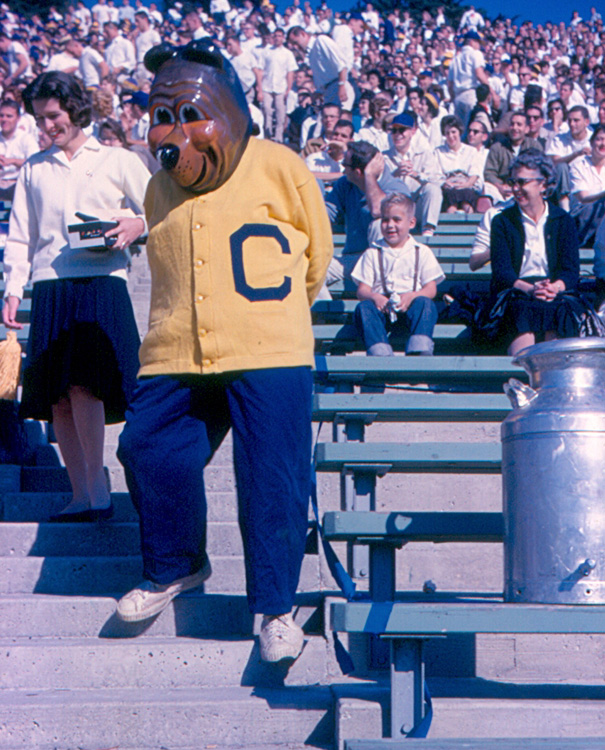
Cal's mascot Oski the Bear in 1961

Cal's last Rose Bowl appearance was in 1958, when the team was coached by Pete Elliott. California went 6–1 in the PCC, but unfortunately lost the 1959 Rose Bowl to Iowa, 38 to 12. That year's team was led by Joe Kapp, who is considered to be one of the greatest players in Cal history. Completely dedicated to his team and his university, he was known to push his teammates to perform beyond their limits and to fiercely intimidate his opponents. He led the team again in 1982 when he accepted the head coaching job at the university.

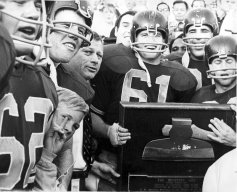
Ray Willsey and the 1967 team celebrating a Big Game win

From 1964 to 1971, the team was led by head coach Ray Willsey, who had a losing career, but it was under him that Cal had one of the sternest defenses in its modern history. Known as The Bear Minimum, the 1968 team was let by Ed White an All-American and future member of College Hall of Fame. Relying on its defense Cal went 7–3–1 and ranking as high as 8th in the AP poll. It won 21–7 at Michigan and beat No. 10 Syracuse 43–0. Earning three shutouts, it held its opponents to 10.4 points a game. The Bear Minimum still holds Cal's records for opponents' average gains per play – 3.60, as well as the fewest rushing touchdowns per season – 5 (same as the Thunder Team). Its average yards per rush was 2.51 which is still second only to the Thunder Team with 2.50 yards per rush.

In the 1970s Cal had seven winning seasons, in 1975 it was led by coach Mike White, running back Chuck Muncie, and quarterback Joe Roth. The team led the nation in total offense, sharing the Pac-8 title with UCLA. Roth had a great start in 1976, however during the season his performance started to drop. Unknown to almost everyone, Roth was diagnosed with melanoma, the most dangerous form of skin cancer. Only White and very few people at Cal knew about it. With Roth continuing to play he still had a strong season and was named an All-American. His last game was in January 1977 at an all-star game in Japan, he died several weeks later in Berkeley. In respect of his perseverance, and dedication to others, his former locker is dedicated in his honor and the annual home game against that year's opponent UCLA or USC, it is known as the Joe Roth Memorial Game, and an annual award bearing his name goes to the Cal player who best exemplifies Roth's courage, sportsmanship and attitude. Rich Campbell was a highly touted recruit out of Santa Teresa High School in San Jose, California and was Cal's starting quarterback for his sophomore through senior seasons, 1978–1980. Campbell was the recipient of the highly valued Joe Roth Award in 1978, and Roth had actually helped to recruit Campbell to Cal. Campbell's success in the 1979 season as a junior led to his being featured on the cover of Street and Smith's Official Yearbook 1980 College Football Preview.

Stats for 1979, Cal's only bowl appearance between 1958 and 1990, show Campbell was 3rd in the nation in passing yards, 2nd in completions, 2nd in completion %, and Cal was 3rd in Team Passing Offense. In 1980, during his senior year at the University of California, he set a then-NCAA record with 43 completed passes in 53 attempts in a losing effort against the Florida Gators. Campbell was also an All-American his senior season, completing an NCAA best 71% of his passes. During his college career at Cal, he passed for 7174 yards, a record at the time. He is still fourth all time in both passing yards and completions at Cal, as well as 12th in touchdown passes. Among the top quarterbacks ever at Cal, he was the most accurate passer in Cal history, as well as in the top five in both yards per attempt at 7.7 and passing efficiency rating (min. 300 attempts) at 132.7.

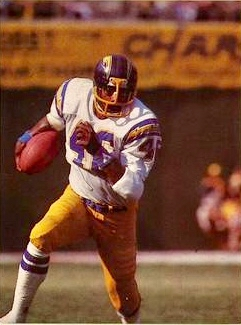
Former Cal running Chuck Muncie pictured with the San Diego Chargers in 1981 set several Cal school records and finished as runner-up for the Heisman Trophy in 1975

In the 1980s, the program returned to mediocrity, with Cal posting only one winning season in the entire decade, in 1982. The team was coached by Cal's former quarterback Joe Kapp and is most known for what happened in the annual Big Game against Stanford, which became known as The Play. Led by quarterback John Elway, Stanford made a field goal with only four seconds left in the game, resulting in the Cardinal taking a one-point lead. In the ensuing kickoff return, Cal used five laterals to score a touchdown and turn certain defeat into a 25–20 victory. The Play is considered to be one of the most memorable moments in college football history. After the game, Cal did not have a winning season until 1990. That year the team was led by head coach Bruce Snyder. The team finished 4th in the Pac-10, with even greater improvement coming in the following year. The Bears finished the 1991 season in 2nd place in the conference, and were invited to play against the Clemson Tigers in the Florida Citrus Bowl. While the Tigers finished first in the Atlantic Coast Conference, they were thoroughly defeated by the Bears 37–13. Because of salary negotiation problems with Cal's new athletic director, Snyder left Cal for the Arizona State Sun Devils right after the Citrus Bowl. In 1993 and under Cal's next coach Keith Gilbertson, Cal went 9–4 overall and 4–4 in the Pac-10, finishing in 5th place. The team did not have a better season during the next 10 years; in 2001 under coach Tom Holmoe, the Bears won only one game.

=== 21st century ===
California began a renaissance under Jeff Tedford who became head coach in 2002. Under him the Golden Bears posted eight consecutive winning seasons, a feat that had not been accomplished since the days of Pappy Waldorf. They also got their first win over Stanford in 8 years. After being ruled ineligible for a bowl game in 2002 due to academic infractions under Holmoe, the Bears went on to appear in seven straight bowl games.

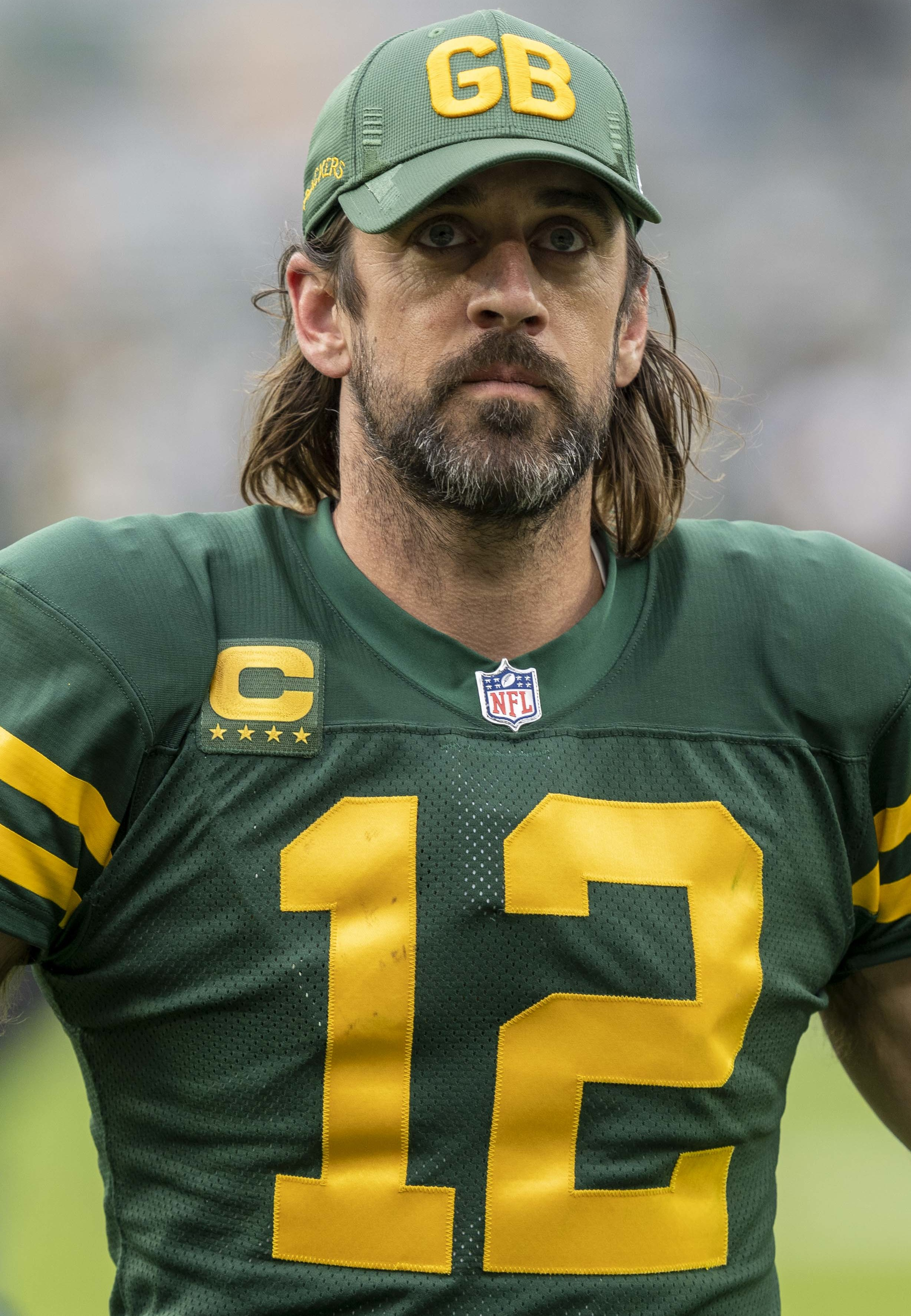
Quarterback Aaron Rodgers played at Cal in 2003 and 2004

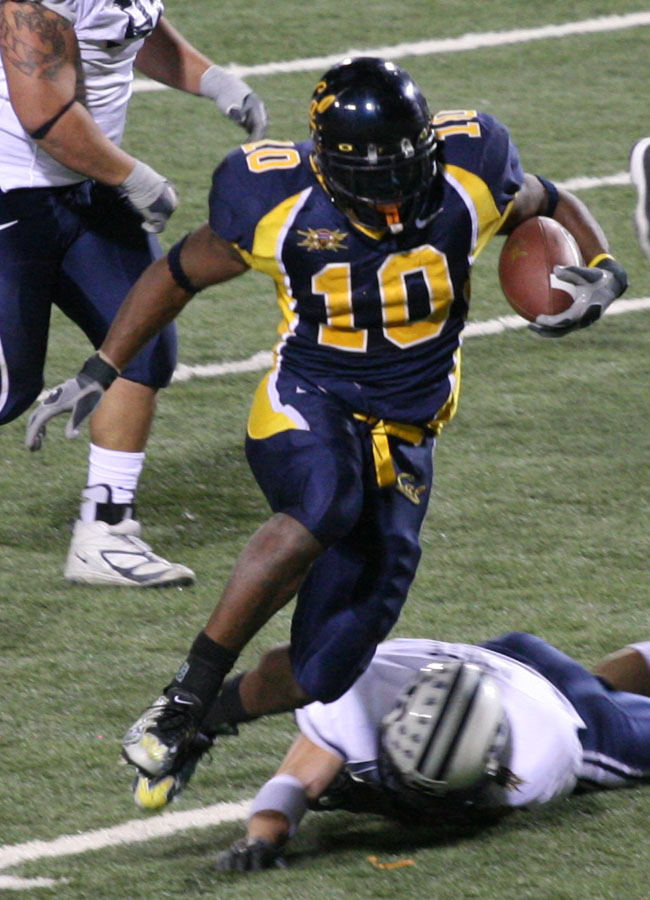
Running back Marshawn Lynch at the 2005 Las Vegas Bowl

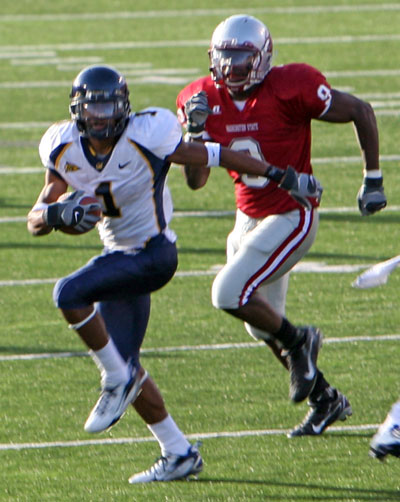
Wide receiver DeSean Jackson in 2006

Led by future NFL superstar Aaron Rodgers, the 2004 Bears posted a 10–1 regular season record. Their only loss came against the eventual national champion USC. The team finished the regular season ranked No. 4 in the nation. Likely due to the intensive media and coach polling lobbying conducted by Texas coach Mack Brown, Cal was not invited to the Rose Bowl. California was upset by lower ranked Texas Tech in that season's Holiday Bowl. In 2006, the bears finished the conference 7–2, sharing the Pac-10 title with USC. It was Cal's first Pac-10 championship since 1975. After that year, the Bears did not rank higher than 4th place under Telford. His last year was 2012. Tedford left the Bears with the most bowl wins (five), conference wins (50), and games coached (139), in school's history. He also tied Pappy Waldorf for most Big Game wins-7. During his tenure, California produced 40 players drafted by the NFL, including eight first-round picks.

At the end of 2012, Sonny Dykes was announced as the new head coach. The hire of Dykes was intended to improve the program's low graduation rate under Tedford. He was expected to bring significant offensive improvements with his up-tempo, pass-oriented Air Raid offense. However, his first year will be most remembered for the team's defensive failure. He became the first head coach in Golden Bear history which did not win against a single Division I NCAA opponent. Over four years at Cal, Dykes failed to have a single winning season within the conference. Quarterback Jared Goff can be considered one of the few positive highlights of that period. In his three years under Dykes' Air Raid, he set 26 team records, including most season and career touchdowns, pass yardage gained, as well as the lowest percentage of interceptions.

In 2017, Cal appointed Justin Wilcox, whose defensive-minded approach could be considered a polar opposite of Dykes, as the new coach. In 2017, the Bears had a losing season but managed to win against No. 8 Washington State 37–3. In 2018, the Bears went 7–6 with Wilcox's defense being ranked No. 15 in the nation in total yards allowed. The highlight of the season was defeating USC for the first time since 2003, when Wilcox was the Cal linebackers coach. In the 2019 season, the Bears improved to an 8–5 record that included a win at the Redbox Bowl. They achieved their highest ranking since 2009 when they were ranked No. 15 after a 4–0 start to the season and also beat Stanford in the Big Game for the first time since 2009. Since 2019, the Bears have struggled, failing to post a winning record in each season.

Prior to the 2024 season, California moved from the Pac-12 Conference to the Atlantic Coast Conference. On October 5 of that year, California hosted their first College GameDay in school history before a game against the Miami Hurricanes. The 2024 season was notable for its stretch of four consecutive losses by a combined nine points. However, Cal won four consecutive Big Games from 2021 to 2024. In 2025, alumnus Ron Rivera was announced as the first ever general manager of the California football program, with oversight over their budget and football staff. After losing the Big Game to Stanford in a resounding 31-10 fashion, Wilcox was fired by Rivera near the end of his first season as GM. Less than two weeks later, Tosh Lupoi, a former California defensive lineman and the Oregon Ducks defensive coordinator, was announced as Cal's new head coach by Rivera.

== Conference affiliations ==
- Independent (1886–1905, 1915)
- Pac-12 Conference (1916–2023)
  - Pacific Coast Conference (1916–1958)
  - Athletic Association of Western Universities (1959–1967)
  - Pacific-8 Conference (1968–1977)
  - Pacific-10 Conference (1978–2010)
  - Pac-12 Conference (2011–2023)
- Atlantic Coast Conference (2024–present)

== Memorial Stadium ==
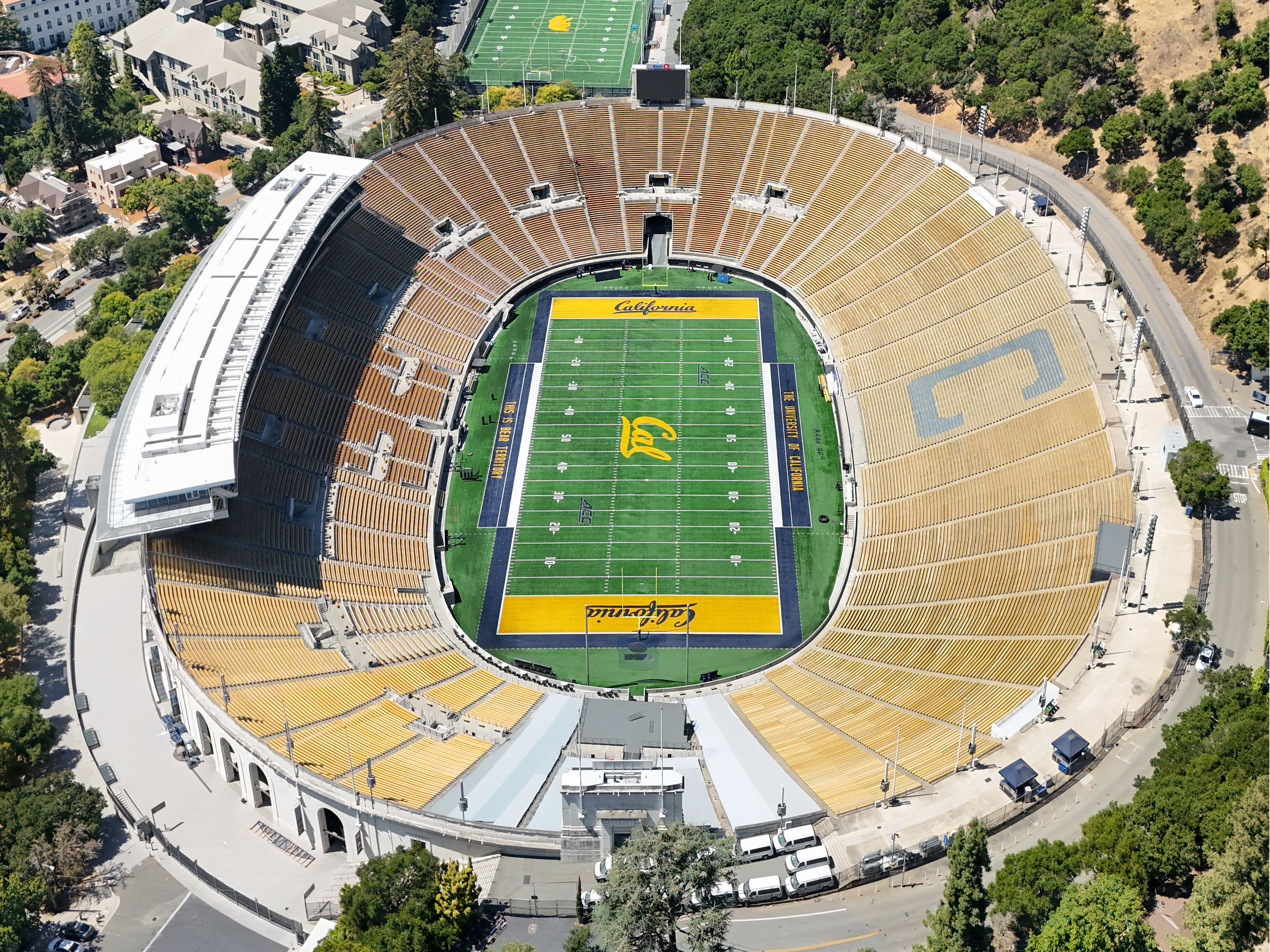
California Memorial Stadium

California Memorial Stadium was built to honor Berkeley alumni, students, and other Californians who died in World War I and modeled after the Colosseum in Rome. It has been named one of the top college football stadiums by various publications, and it is also listed on the U.S. National Register of Historic Places. The stadium is located on the Hayward Fault, which passes directly under the playing field, nearly from goal post to goal post. A 1998 seismic safety study on the California campus gave the stadium a "poor" rating (meaning that the building represents an "appreciable life hazard" in an earthquake). The renovation began in the summer of 2010 and was completed by the beginning of the 2012 season.

== Championships ==
=== National championships ===
California has won five (1920, 1921, 1922, 1923, 1937) national championships from NCAA-designated major selectors. California claims all five of the national championships. The Golden Bears have never finished a season No. 1 in the final AP or Coaches' Poll.

Year	Coach	Selector	Record	Bowl	Opponent	Result	Final AP	Final Coaches
1920	Andy Smith	Football Research, Helms, Houlgate, National Championship Foundation, Sagarin, Sagarin (ELO-Chess)	9–0	Rose Bowl	Ohio State	W 28–0	–	–
1921	Andy Smith	Billingsley MOV, Boand, Football Research, Sagarin, Sagarin (ELO-Chess)	9–0–1	Rose Bowl	Washington & Jefferson	T 0–0	–	–
1922	Andy Smith	Billingsley MOV, Houlgate, NCF, Sagarin	9–0	–			–	–
1923	Andy Smith	Houlgate	9–0–1	–			–	–
1937	Stub Allison	Dunkel, Helms	10–0–1	Rose Bowl	Alabama	W 13–0	No. 2	–

=== Conference championships ===
California has won 16 conference championships since 1916.

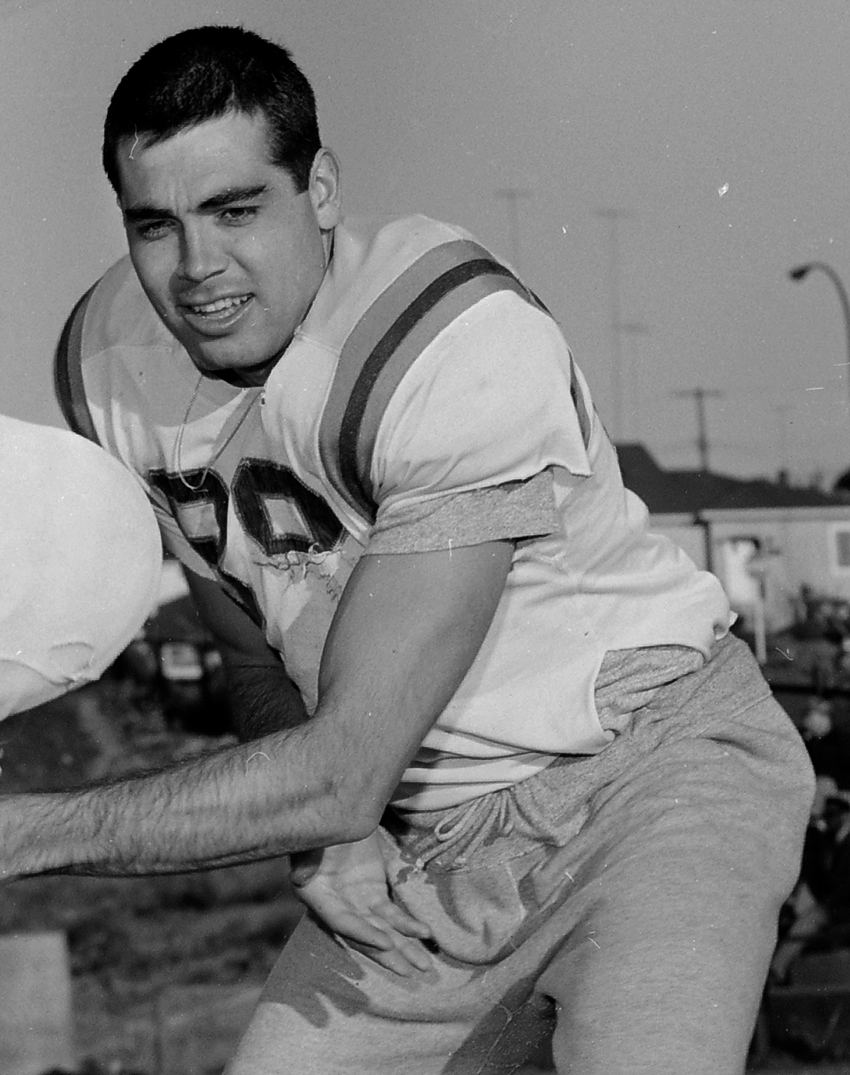
Quarterback Joe Kapp guided the Golden Bears to the 1958 PCC championship. Kapp is the only quarterback to play in the Super Bowl, Rose Bowl, and the Grey Cup.

Year	Conference	Coach	Conference record	Overall record
1918	PCC	Andy Smith	2–0	7–2
1920	PCC	Andy Smith	3–0	9–0
1921	PCC	Andy Smith	4–0	9–0–1
1922	PCC	Andy Smith	4–0	9–0
1923	PCC	Andy Smith	5–0	9–0–1
1924 ^{†}	PCC	Andy Smith	2–0–2	8–0–2
1929 ^{†}	PCC	Nibs Price	4–1	7–1–1
1935 ^{†}	PCC	Stub Allison	4–1	9–1
1937	PCC	Stub Allison	6–0–1	10–0–1
1938 ^{†}	PCC	Stub Allison	6–1	10–1
1948 ^{†}	PCC	Pappy Waldorf	6–0	10–1
1949	PCC	Pappy Waldorf	7–0	10–1
1950	PCC	Pappy Waldorf	5–0–1	9–1–1
1958	PCC	Pete Elliott	6–1	7–4
1975 ^{†}	Pac-8	Mike White	6–1	8–3
2006 ^{†}	Pac-10	Jeff Tedford	7–2	10–3

† Co-champions

== Rankings ==
Cal football has finished Top 25 in the nation per the AP poll 14 times in school history.

1937	1938	1947	1948	1949	1950	1951	1958	1975	1991	1993	2004	2005	2006
2	14	15	4	3	5	12	16	14	8	25	9	25	14

== Rivalries ==
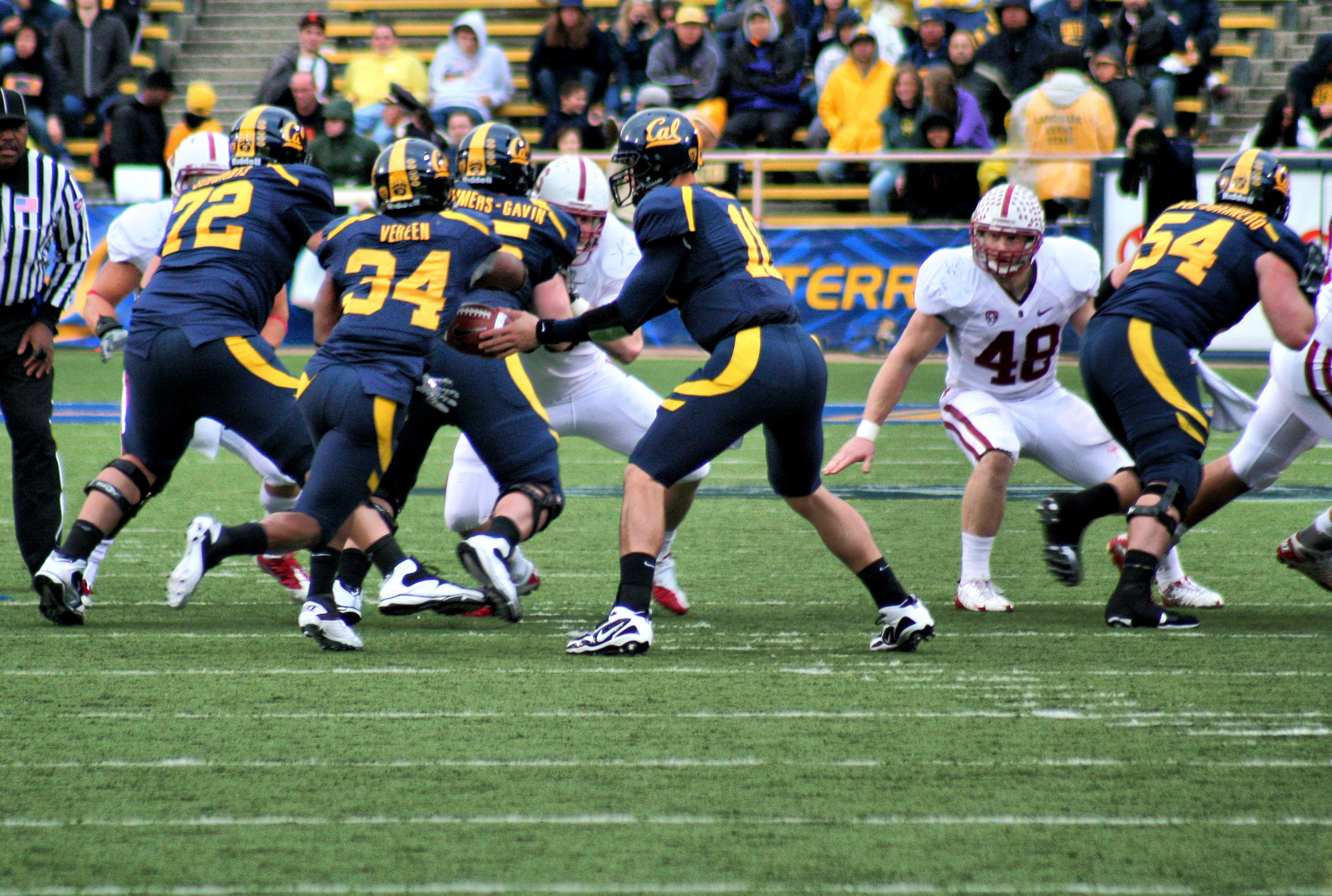
The Big Game vs. Stanford in 2010

=== Stanford ===
California's main rival is Stanford. The two schools participate in the Big Game every year, with the winner taking home the Stanford Axe. Stanford leads the series record at 65–51–11 through the 2024 season. However, California has held the Axe for the last 4 seasons.

=== UCLA ===
California has an active rivalry with UCLA and the teams are scheduled to play each other for at least the next four seasons (2026–2029). The schools are the two largest public universities in the state of California and both were part of the same conference for 95 years. UCLA leads the series 57–35–1 but Cal won the most recent contest 33–7 at Pasadena in November 2023.

=== USC ===
Cal also has a rivalry with USC. While not as significant as the Stanford or UCLA rivalries, for either school, Cal and USC played an annual game, and met more than 100 times. The game was often called The Weekender, referring to the weekend trip to the Bay Area; although, this term also applied to the Stanford game, as each series (Cal/USC and Stanford/USC) would alternate home and away. For Cal, the USC or UCLA game was later known as the Joe Roth Game, depending on who the Golden Bears played in Berkeley, a tradition started in 1977 to honor the former Cal quarterback. As of the 2023 season, USC had played Cal more than any other opponent, with the 2023 game marking the 112th meeting, according to Cal, and the 108th meeting according to USC, with discrepancies in the game record before 1920. Cal's record in the series was 33–73–6, as of 2023. The last Weekender was played on October 28, 2023, with Cal losing to USC 49–50. In 2024, USC joined the Big Ten Conference while Cal joined the Atlantic Coast Conference. This put the rivalry between the Bears and Trojans on hiatus with no future meetings scheduled as of March 2025.

=== Other rivals ===
Other rivals of the Bears include; conference member SMU Mustangs and the Oregon State Beavers of the Pac 12 Conference.

== Head coaches ==
No.	Coach	Tenure	Seasons	Wins	Losses	Ties	Pct.	Bowls
1	Oscar S. Howard	1886	1	6	2	1	.722	0
1.5	No coach	1887–1892	5	18	4	0	.818	0
2	Lee McClung	1892	1	2	1	1	.625	0
3	Pudge Heffelfinger	1893	1	5	1	1	.786	0
4	Charles O. Gill	1894	1	0	1	2	.333	0
5	Frank Butterworth	1895–1896	2	9	3	3	.700	0
6	Charles P. Nott	1897	1	0	3	2	.200	0
7	Garrett Cochran	1898–1899	2	15	1	3	.868	0
8	Addison Kelly	1900	1	4	2	1	.643	0
9	Frank W. Simpson	1901	1	9	0	1	.950	0
10	James Whipple	1902–1903	2	14	1	2	.882	0
11	James Hopper	1904	1	6	1	1	.813	0
12	J. W. Knibbs	1905	1	4	1	2	.714	0
14†	James Schaeffer	1915	1	8	5	0	.615	0
15	Andy Smith	1916–1925	10	74	16	7	.799	2
16	Nibs Price	1926–1930	5	27	17	3	.606	1
17	Bill Ingram	1931–1934	4	27	14	4	.644	0
18	Stub Allison	1935–1944	10	58	42	2	.578	1
19	Buck Shaw	1945	1	4	5	1	.450	0
20	Frank Wickhorst	1946	1	2	7	0	.222	0
21	Pappy Waldorf	1947–1956	10	67	32	4	.650	3
22	Pete Elliott	1957–1959	3	10	21	0	.323	1
23	Marv Levy	1960–1963	4	8	29	3	.238	0
24	Ray Willsey	1964–1971	8	40	42	1	.488	0
25	Mike White	1972–1977	6	35	30	1	.538	0
26	Roger Theder	1978–1981	4	18	27	0	.400	1
27	Joe Kapp	1982–1986	5	20	34	1	.373	0
28	Bruce Snyder	1987–1991	5	29	24	4	.544	2
29	Keith Gilbertson	1992–1995	4	20	26	0	.435	1
30	Steve Mariucci	1996	1	6	6	0	.500	1
31	Tom Holmoe	1997–2001	5	12	43	0	.218	0
32	Jeff Tedford	2002–2012	11	82	57	0	.590	8
33	Sonny Dykes	2013–2016	4	19	30	0	.388	1
34	Justin Wilcox	2017–2025	9	48	55	0	.466	3
Int	Nick Rolovich	2025	1	1	1	0	.500	0
35	Tosh Lupoi	2026–present	1	3	8	0	.273	0

† From 1906 to 1914, rugby was played instead of football. Cal's 13th coach was Oscar Taylor from 1906 to 1908. Cal's 14th coach, James Schaeffer, coached rugby from 1909 to 1914 and football in 1915.

== Bowl games ==
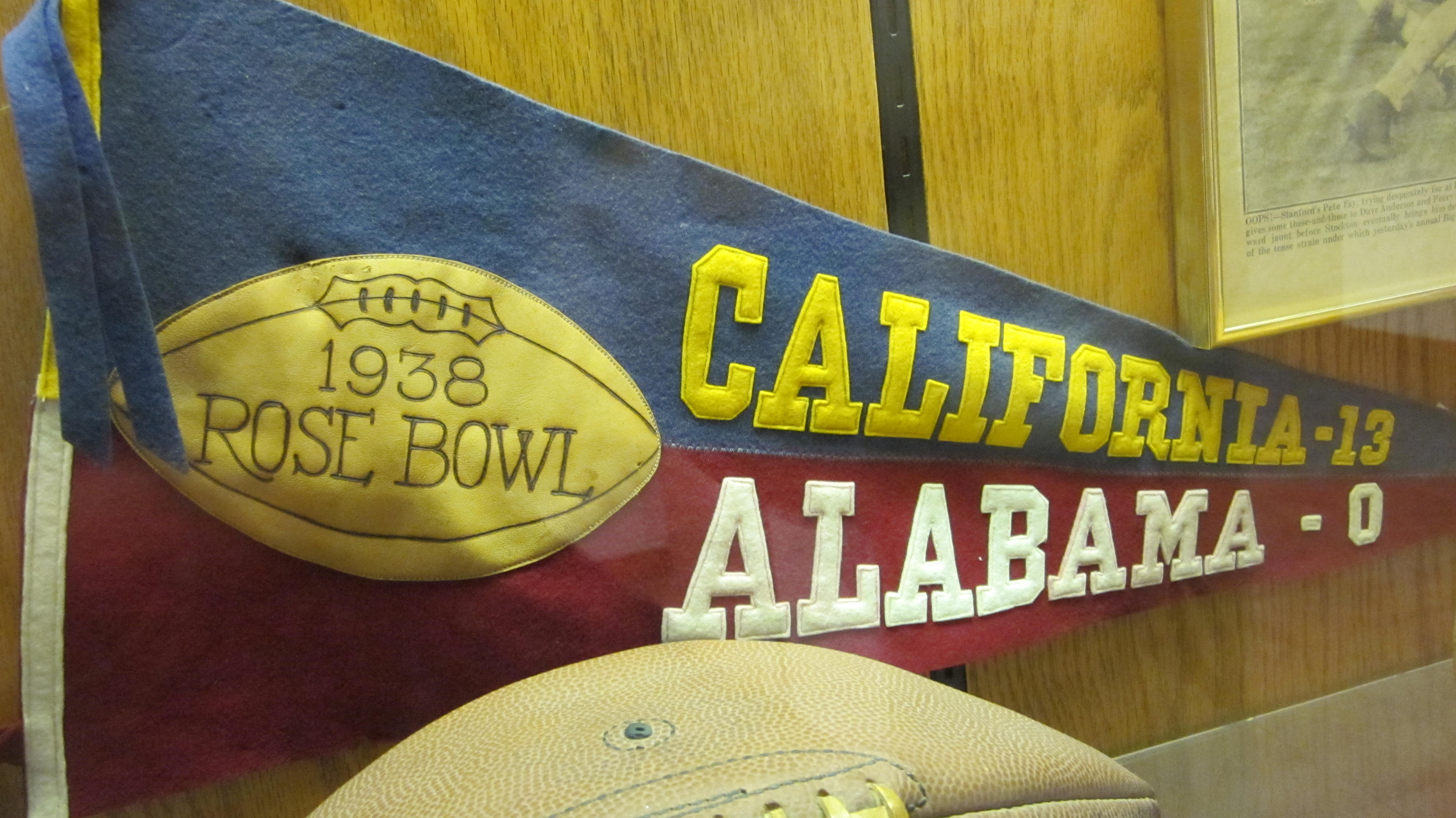
1938 Rose Bowl banner

California has participated in 27 bowl games, with a record of 12–14–1.

Year	Coach	Bowl	Opponent	Result
1920	Andy Smith	Rose	Ohio State	W 28–0
1921	Andy Smith	Rose	Washington & Jefferson	T 0–0
1928	Nibs Price	Rose	Georgia Tech	L 7–8
1937	Stub Allison	Rose	Alabama	W 13–0
1948	Pappy Waldorf	Rose	Northwestern	L 14–20
1949	Pappy Waldorf	Rose	Ohio State	L 14–17
1950	Pappy Waldorf	Rose	Michigan	L 6–14
1958	Pete Elliott	Rose	Iowa	L 12–38
1979	Roger Theder	Garden State	Temple	L 17–28
1990	Bruce Snyder	Copper	Wyoming	W 17–15
1991	Bruce Snyder	Citrus	Clemson	W 37–13
1993	Keith Gilbertson	Alamo	Iowa	W 37–3
1996	Steve Mariucci	Aloha	Navy	L 38–42
2003	Jeff Tedford	Insight	Virginia Tech	W 52–49
2004	Jeff Tedford	Holiday	Texas Tech	L 31–45
2005	Jeff Tedford	Las Vegas	BYU	W 35–28
2006	Jeff Tedford	Holiday	Texas A&M	W 45–10
2007	Jeff Tedford	Armed Forces	Air Force	W 42–36
2008	Jeff Tedford	Emerald	Miami	W 24–17
2009	Jeff Tedford	Poinsettia	Utah	L 27–37
2011	Jeff Tedford	Holiday	Texas	L 10–21
2015	Sonny Dykes	Armed Forces	Air Force	W 55–36
2018	Justin Wilcox	Cheez-It	TCU	L 7–10
2019	Justin Wilcox	Redbox	Illinois	W 35–20
2023	Justin Wilcox	Independence	Texas Tech	L 14–34
2024	Justin Wilcox	LA	UNLV	L 13–24
2025	Nick Rolovich (interim)	Hawaii	Hawaii	L 31–35

== Current NFL players ==
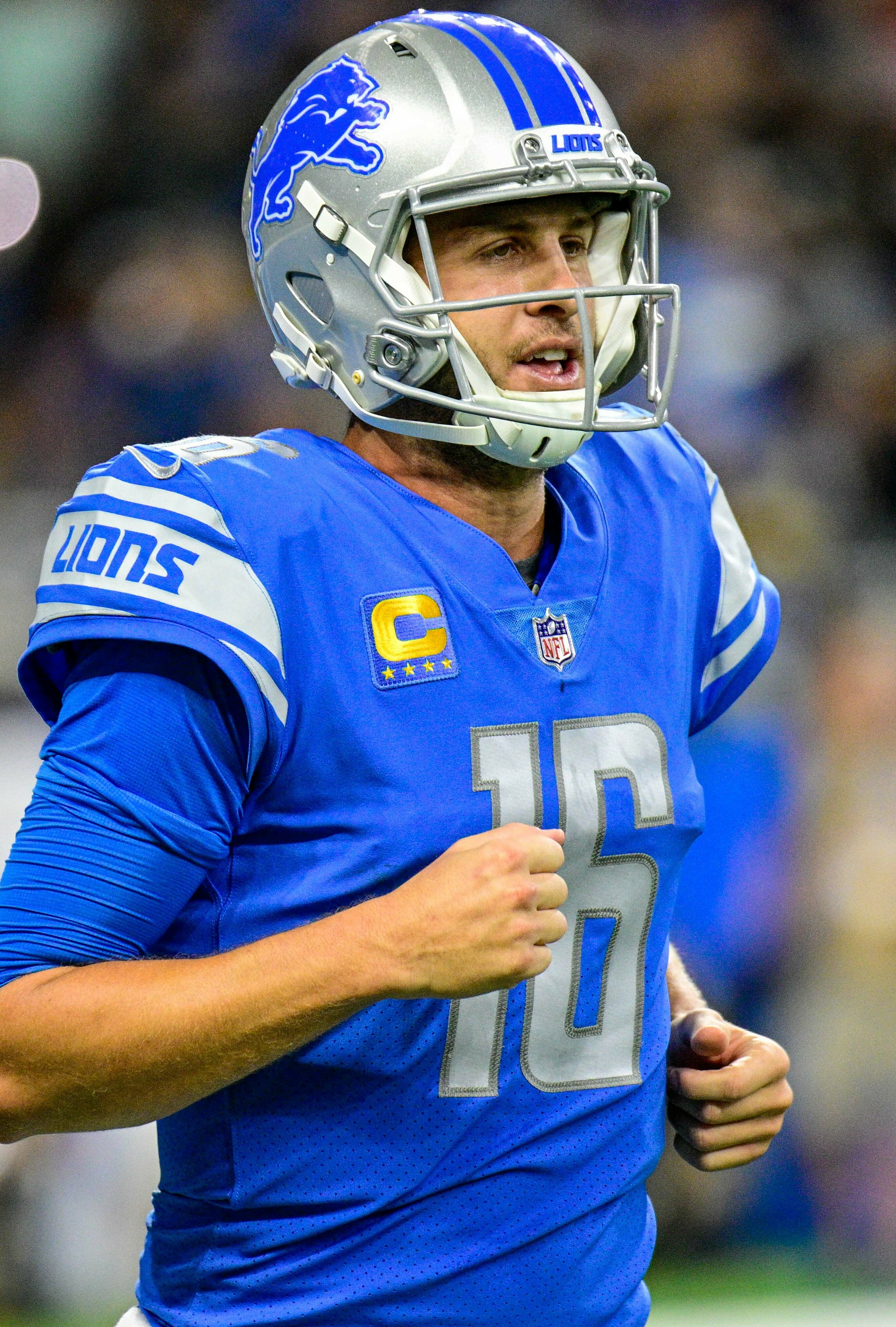
QB Jared Goff

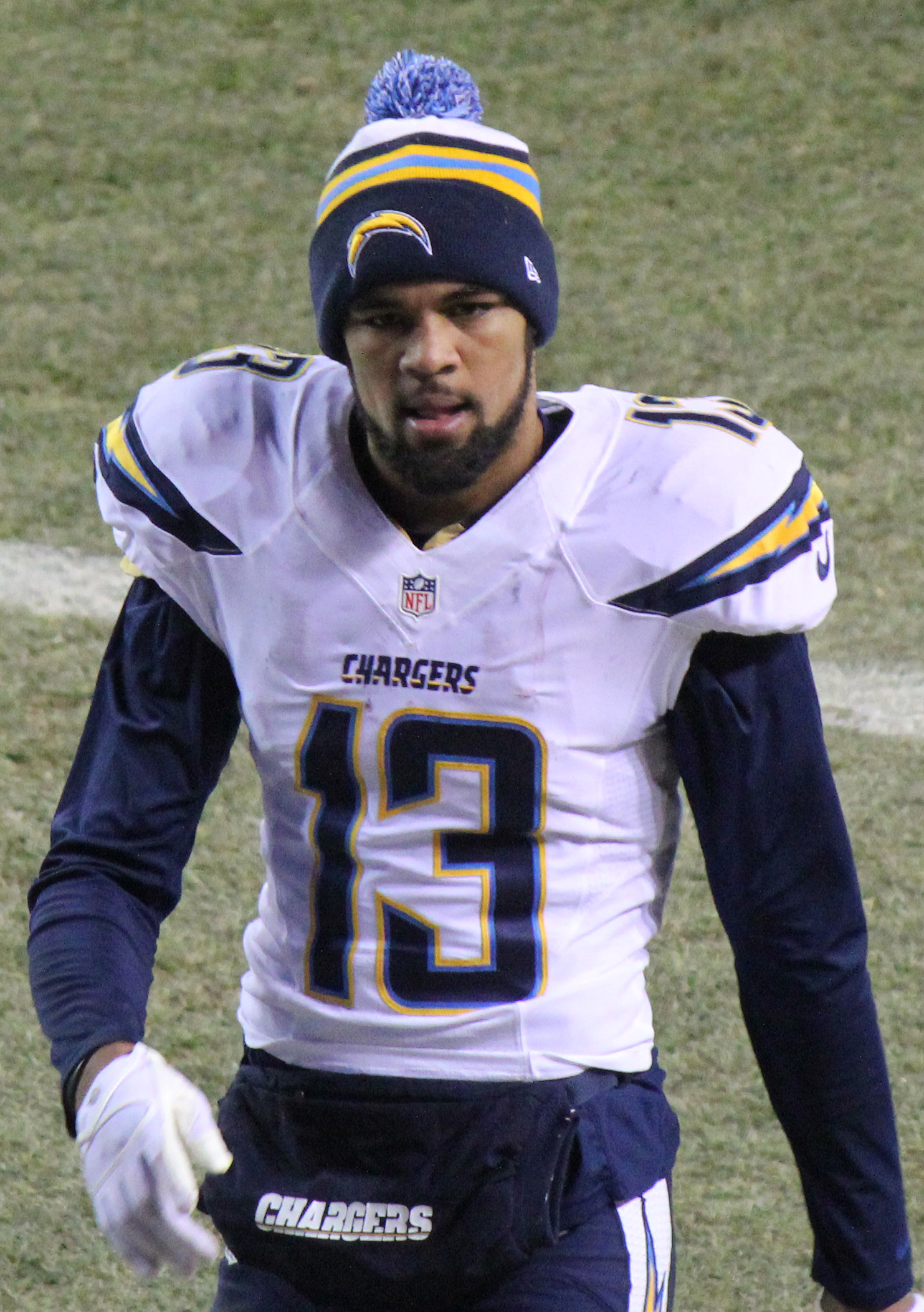
WR Keenan Allen

As of December 15, 2025

Player	Position	NFL team	NFL Year
Keenan Allen	WR	Los Angeles Chargers	2013
Bryan Anger	P	Dallas Cowboys	2012
Teddye Buchanan	LB	Baltimore Ravens	2025
Camryn Bynum	S	Indianapolis Colts	2021
Jake Curhan	OT	Carolina Panthers	2021
Ashtyn Davis	S	Miami Dolphins	2020
Jared Goff	QB	Detroit Lions	2016
Cameron Goode	LB	Miami Dolphins	2022
Marcus Harris	CB	Tennessee Titans	2025
Jaylinn Hawkins	S	New England Patriots	2020
Elijah Hicks	S	Chicago Bears	2022
Cameron Jordan	DE	New Orleans Saints	2011
Patrick Mekari	G	Jacksonville Jaguars	2019
Aaron Rodgers	QB	Pittsburgh Steelers	2005
Jake Tonges	TE	San Francisco 49ers	2022
Daniel Scott	S	Indianapolis Colts	2023
Jackson Sirmon	LB	New York Jets	2024
Nohl Williams	CB	Kansas City Chiefs	2025
Craig Woodson	S	New England Patriots	2025

== Retired numbers ==
California Golden Bears retired numbers
No.	Player	Pos.	Tenure	Year retired	Ref.
12	Joe Roth	QB	1975–1976	1977	

== Future opponents ==
=== Conference opponents ===
On October 30, 2023, the Atlantic Coast Conference (ACC) announced the future schedules for California from 2024 to 2030. The 17-team ACC will play an eight-game conference schedule with just one division, with four non-conference contests. All 17 teams will play each other at least twice in 7 years, once at home and once on the road. The new scheduling gives Cal two protected games to play each year with SMU and Stanford (rivalry). On September 22, 2025, the ACC announced that it was moving to a nine-game conference schedule beginning in 2026. On December 16, 2025, league opponents were announced for 2026, in which 12 teams would play a nine-game schedule, and the other 5 teams would play an eight-game schedule. California will be playing a nine-game conference schedule. On September 16, 2026, league opponents for 2027 were announced, with California playing a nine-game schedule.

2026	2027	2028	2029	2030
Clemson	Boston College	Georgia Tech	Duke	Clemson
Pittsburgh	Florida State	NC State	Miami	North Carolina
Stanford	Louisville	Pittsburgh	SMU	Stanford
Virginia Tech	SMU	Stanford	Syracuse	Virginia
Wake Forest	at Georgia Tech	at Florida State	at Boston College	at Duke
at NC State	at Miami	at Louisville	at Clemson	at Georgia Tech
at SMU	at Pittsburgh	at SMU	at North Carolina	at SMU
at Syracuse	at Stanford	at Wake Forest	at Stanford	at Virginia Tech
at Virginia	at Wake Forest			

=== Non-conference opponents ===
Announced schedules as of June 25, 2026.

2026	2027	2028	2029	2030	2031	2032
UCLA	Sacramento State	UCLA	Wisconsin	at Wisconsin	at San Jose State	Wyoming
Wagner	at UCLA	San Jose State	at Wyoming			
at UNLV	Old Dominion	at Minnesota	at UCLA			
