= 1929 Rose Bowl =

American college football game

- 15th Rose Bowl Game
Georgia Tech Golden Tornado	California Golden Bears
(9–0)	(6–1–2)
SoCon	PCC
8	7
Head coach: William Alexander	Head coach: Nibs Price
	1	2	3	4	Total
Georgia Tech	0	2	6	0	8
California	0	0	0	7	7
- Date: January 1, 1929
- Season: 1928
- Stadium: Rose Bowl
- Location: Pasadena, California
- MVP: Benny Lom (California)
- National anthem: Cal Band
- Referee: C. W. Streit
- Halftime show: Cal Band, Golden Tornado Band
- Attendance: 66,604

The 1929 Rose Bowl was a college football bowl game and the 15th annual Rose Bowl Game. Played on January 1, 1929, the game saw the Georgia Tech Yellow Jackets (known at the time as the Georgia Tech Golden Tornado) defeat the California Golden Bears by a score of 8–7. The game was notable for a play in which Cal's All-American center Roy Riegels scooped up a Georgia Tech fumble and ran in the wrong direction towards his own goal line, earning him the dubious nickname, "Wrong Way". The two-point safety on the ensuing punt proved to be the margin of victory. Riegels' teammate Benny Lom, who attempted to tackle Riegels on the run, was named the Rose Bowl Player Of The Game when the award was created in 1953 and selections were made retroactively.

== Teams ==
=== Georgia Tech Yellow Jackets ===
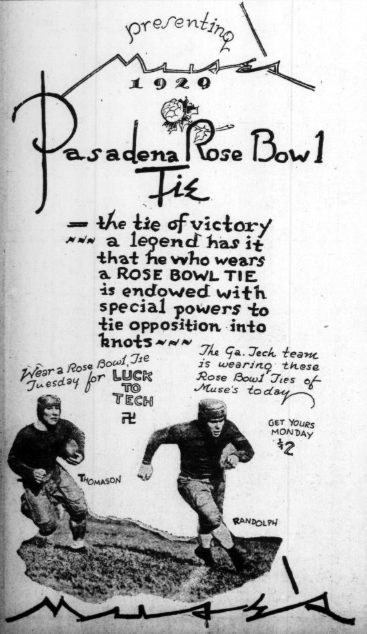
Advertisement featuring Georgia Tech players Stumpy Thomason and Bob Randolph

This was the first appearance for Georgia Tech in a post season bowl game. They had run through their regular season schedule. This included a 13–0 win over Notre Dame and a 20–6 win over Georgia in the Clean, Old-Fashioned Hate rivalry game. They were named national champion by two organizations. They were invited by the Tournament of Roses committee to play in the game.

=== California Golden Bears ===
California was not the Pacific Coast Conference champion in 1928. The 1928 USC Trojans, under coach Howard Jones, were the PCC champions, and also were named a national champion. They were undefeated with a 9–0–1 record. The lone blemish on the Trojans' record came at Cal, who had tied USC 0–0 on October 20. USC had defeated Notre Dame 27–14, the only common opponent with Georgia Tech. The University of Southern California declined the bid to play in the Rose Bowl. California, the second place team with a 3–0–2 conference record appeared instead to represent the Pacific Coast Conference. After tying USC, Cal had lost to the Olympic Club "Winged Os". The Bears beat Oregon, Washington and Nevada. They tied Stanford 13–13 in the 1928 Big Game. The Stanford Indians had appeared in the 1928 Rose Bowl where they defeated Pittsburgh 7–6, having been selected controversially over USC the year before.

== The game ==
On January 1, 1929, the Golden Bears faced the Georgia Tech Yellow Jackets at the Rose Bowl in Pasadena, California. Midway through the second quarter, Cal's Roy Riegels, who played center, picked up a fumble by Tech's Stumpy Thomason. Just 30 yards away from the Yellow Jackets' end zone, Riegels was somehow turned around and ran 65 yards in the wrong direction.

Roy Riegels' wrong way run.

Teammate and quarterback Benny Lom chased Riegels, screaming at him to stop. Known for his speed, Lom finally caught up with Riegels at California's 3-yard line and tried to turn him around, but he was immediately hit by a wave of Tech players and tackled back to the 1-yard line. The Bears chose to punt rather than risk a play so close to their own end zone, but Tech's Vance Maree blocked Lom's punt for a safety, giving Georgia Tech a 2–0 lead.

Riegels was so distraught that he had to be talked into returning to the game for the second half. Lom passed for a touchdown and kicked the extra point, and Riegels blocked a Tech punt in the second half, but Tech would win the game—and their second national championship—by a final score of 8–7.

== Scoring ==
=== Second Quarter ===
- GT – Maree and Westbrook block Lom’s punt for a safety

=== Third Quarter ===
- GT – Thomason, 14-yard run (Thomason kick failed)

=== Fourth Quarter ===
- Cal – Phillips, 10-yard pass from Lom (Barr kick good)

== Aftermath ==
After the game, coach Nibs Price defended Riegels, saying "It was an accident that might have happened to anyone." Price credits Riegels as the smartest player he ever coached. Riegels explained that he was hit during a pivot and wound up doing a U-turn, which faced him the opposite direction. Later, the NCAA football rules committee would pass a rule barring a player from advancing a recovered fumble once it hits the ground. Riegels would take his spot as captain during his senior year, earning All-America honors.

Despite the nationwide mockery that followed, Riegels went on to live a normal life, serving in the United States Army Air Forces during World War II, coaching high school, and college football—including time at Cal—and running his own chemical company. He was even able to capitalize on his blunder, parodying the now-famous run in vaudeville acts. Riegels was inducted into the Rose Bowl Hall of Fame in 1991.

The character of "Lefty" Phelps in the movie Flight (1929), directed by Frank Capra, is based on Riegels and uses the incident to propel Phelps into the Marine Corps. The opening sequence uses photographs of Riegels during the actual Rose Bowl game.

Benny Lom was named Most Valuable player of the game retroactively when the award was instituted in 1953.

Riegels used his experience to encourage others who had made similar plays. In 1957, Paramount High School's Jan Bandringa had intercepted a pass only to run it 55 yards into his own end zone, resulting in a safety for Centennial High, who won the game 9–7. In a regular season game in 1964, Jim Marshall of the Minnesota Vikings also ran a recovered fumble into his own end zone. Both received word of encouragement from Riegels.

In 1971, Tech's entire 1928 team was inducted into the Georgia Tech Hall of Fame. Roy Riegels and teammate Benny Lom attended as special guests. The Georgia Tech Letterman's Club presented Riegels and Lom with membership cards.

In 1991, Riegels was inducted into the Rose Bowl Hall of Fame. Riegels died in 1993, at the age of 84. In 1998, he was posthumously elected to Cal's Hall of Fame.

In 2003, a panel from the College Football Hall of Fame and CBS Sports chose Riegels' "Wrong way run in the Rose Bowl" one of six "Most Memorable Moments of the Century."

== Quotes from and about the 1929 Rose Bowl ==
- "He's running the wrong way. Let's see how far he can go."—Georgia Tech head coach Bill Alexander
- "What am I seeing? What's wrong with me? Am I crazy? Am I crazy? Am I crazy?"—Broadcaster Graham McNamee, calling the game on radio
- "Coach, I can't do it. I've ruined you, I've ruined myself, I've ruined the University of California. I couldn't face that crowd to save my life."
  "Roy, get up and go back out there — the game is only half over."—Halftime exchange between Riegels and head coach Nibs Price
- "For many years I've had to go along and laugh whenever my wrong-way run was brought up, even though I've grown tired listening and reading about it. But it certainly wasn't the most serious thing in the world. I regretted doing it, even as you do, but you'll get over it."—Letter from Riegels to Paramount High School's Jan Bandringa in 1957. Bandringa had intercepted a pass only to run it 55 yards into his own end zone, resulting in a safety for Centennial High, who won the game 9–7.
- When presented his membership card into the Georgia Tech Lettermen's Club, Riegels quipped, "Believe me, I feel I've earned this."
