= 1928 Northern Arizona Lumberjacks football team =

American college football season

1928 Northern Arizona Lumberjacks football
- Conference: Independent
- Record: 7–1
- Head coach: Rudy Lavik (2nd season)

1928 Western college football independents records
	Conf.			Overall
Team	W	L	T	W		L		T
Arizona		–		5	–	1	–	2
Idaho Southern Branch		–		5	–	1	–	2
Gonzaga		–		6	–	2	–	1
New Mexico		–		5	–	2	–	1
Humboldt State		–		2	–	1	–	0
Loyola (CA)		–		5	–	3	–	0
Tempe State		–		3	–	2	–	1
Regis		–		5	–	4	–	0
Santa Clara		–		5	–	4	–	0
New Mexico A&M		–		4	–	5	–	0
Hawaii		–		2	–	5	–	0

The 1928 Northern Arizona Lumberjacks football team was an American football team that represented Northern Arizona Teachers College at Flagstaff (now known as Northern Arizona University) as an independent during the 1928 college football season. In their second year under head coach Rudy Lavik, the Lumberjacks compiled a 7–1 record, shut out five of eight opponents, and outscored all opponents by a total of 274 to 37.

== Schedule ==
Date	Opponent	Site	Result	Source
September 29	Gila College	Flagstaff, AZ	W 68–0	
October 6	at Loyola (CA)	Los Angeles, CA	L 0–18	
October 13	Phoenix Indian School	Flagstaff, AZ	W 34–0	
October 20	New Mexico	Flagstaff, AZ	W 12–0	
November 3	Santa Barbara State	Flagstaff, AZ	W 33–0	
November 10	at Tempe State^{†}	Tempe, AZ	W 27–6	
November 23	at Phoenix Junior College	Phoenix, AZ	W 80–0	
November 29	at Redlands	Redlands, CA	W 20–13	
^{†}Homecoming
