= List of nurse writers =

Nurse writers are nurses, primarily registered nurses (RNs), who write for general audiences in the creative genres of poetry, fiction, and drama, as well as in creative non-fiction. The published work of the nurse writer is analogous to that of the physician writer, which may or may not deal explicitly with health topics but is informed by a professional experience of human vulnerability and acute observation. The following is a partial list of nurse writers, grouped by century and arranged chronologically by year of birth.

== 19th century ==
- Walt Whitman (1819–1892)
- Florence Nightingale (1820–1910)
- Mary Livermore (1820–1905)
- Emma Maria Pearson (1828–1893)
- Katherine Prescott Wormeley (1830–1908)
- Louisa May Alcott (1832–1888)
- Frances Margaret Taylor (1832–1900)
- Sarah Chauncey Woolsey (1835–1905)
- Sarah Emma Edmonds (1841–1898)
- Susie Taylor (1848–1912)

== 20th century ==
- Lillias Hamilton (1858–1925)
- Helen Churchill Candee (1858–1949)
- Lillian D. Wald (1867–1940)
- Ellen Newbold LaMotte (1873–1961)
- Mollie Skinner (1876–1955)
- Mary Roberts Rinehart (1876–1958)
- D. K. Broster (1877–1950)
- Mary Borden (1886–1968)
- Florence Farmborough (1887–1978)
- Agatha Christie (1890–1976)
- Nella Larsen (1891–1964)
- Louise de Kiriline Lawrence (1894–1992)
- Helen Dore Boylston (1895–1984)
- Virginia Avenel Henderson (1897 - 1996)
- Jane Arbor (1903–1994)
- Mary Renault (1905–1983)
- Betty Jeffrey (1908–2000)
- Anne Baker (1914- )
- Patricia St. John (1919–1993)
- Charles Logan (1930- )
- Grace Ogot (1934- )
- Sharon Webb (1936–2010)
- Abasse Ndione (1946- )
- Elizabeth Berg (1948- )
- Sue Monk Kidd (1948- )
- Carol Gino (1941- )
- Echo Heron ( )
- Elizabeth Norman ( )
- John Glenday (1952- )
- Kathleen Pagana (1952- )
- Helene Tursten (1954- )
- Robin Oliveira (1954- )
- Gisele Pineau (1956- )
- Jo Brand (1957- )
- Theodore Deppe ( )
- Anna Jansson (1958- )
- Teresa Medeiros (1962- )

== 21st century ==
- Paul Genesse
- Cortney Davis (1945-)
- Theresa Brown
- Josephine Ensign, FNP, MPH, DrPH.
- Dr. Scharmaine L. Baker, NP
- Wendy Brooks (1977-)
