= 1928 Cal Poly Mustangs football team =

American college football season

1928 Cal Poly Mustangs football
- Conference: California Coast Conference
- Record: 3–4–2 (1–2–1 CCC)
- Head coach: Al Agosti (8th season)

1928 California Coast Conference football standings
	Conf.					Overall
Team	W		L		T	W		L		T
San Mateo +	7	–	0	–	0	?	–	?	–	?
San Jose State +	6	–	2	–	0	6	–	2	–	1
Modesto	5	–	2	–	1	5	–	3	–	1
Sacramento	3	–	2	–	0	?	–	?	–	?
Cal Poly	1	–	2	–	1	3	–	4	–	2
Santa Barbara State	1	–	2	–	0	4	–	5	–	0
Chico State	1	–	4	–	0	2	–	6	–	0
Santa Rosa	2	–	5	–	0	?	–	?	–	?
Marin	0	–	4	–	0	?	–	?	–	?
Championship: San Jose State 21, San Mateo 21
+ – Conference co-champions

The 1928 Cal Poly Mustangs football team represented California Polytechnic School—now known as California Polytechnic State University, San Luis Obispo—as a member of the California Coast Conference (CCC) during the 1928 college football season. Led by eighth-year head coach Al Agosti, Cal Poly compiled an overall record of 3–4–2 with a mark of 1–2–1 in conference play, tying for fifth place in the CCC. The team was outscored by its opponents 90 to 45 for the season and was shut out in five of their nine games. The Mustangs played home games in San Luis Obispo, California.

Cal Poly was a two-year school until 1941.

== Schedule ==
Date	Opponent	Site	Result	Source
September 29	at Fresno State*	Fresno State College Stadium; Fresno, CA	L 0–37	
October 6	Modesto	San Luis Obispo, CA	T 0–0	
October 13	Loyola (CA) freshmen*	San Luis Obispo, CA	W 19–0	
October 20	San Jose State	San Luis Obispo, CA	L 0–6	
October 27	Santa Maria*	San Luis Obispo, CA	W 13–0	
November 3	Santa Rosa	San Luis Obispo, CA	W 6–4	
November 10	at Santa Barbara State*	Peabody Stadium; Santa Barbara, CA	L 0–6	
November 17	at Menlo*	Atherton, CA	T 7–7	
November 29	at Chico State	University Stadium; Chico, CA	L 0–30	
*Non-conference game
