= Quallo =

Quallo is a surname. Notable people with the surname include:

- Isabel Grenfell Quallo (1893–1985), Congolese-born British-American domestic worker
- Peter Quallo (born 1971), German footballer
