= 1928 Santa Barbara State Roadrunners football team =

American college football season

1928 Santa Barbara State Roadrunners football
- Conference: California Coast Conference
- Record: 4–5 (2–2 CCC)
- Head coach: Harold Davis (1st season)
- Home stadium: Peabody Stadium

1928 California Coast Conference football standings
	Conf.					Overall
Team	W		L		T	W		L		T
San Mateo +	7	–	0	–	0	?	–	?	–	?
San Jose State +	6	–	2	–	0	6	–	2	–	1
Modesto	5	–	2	–	1	5	–	3	–	1
Sacramento	3	–	2	–	0	?	–	?	–	?
Cal Poly	1	–	2	–	1	3	–	4	–	2
Santa Barbara State	1	–	2	–	0	4	–	5	–	0
Chico State	1	–	4	–	0	2	–	6	–	0
Santa Rosa	2	–	5	–	0	?	–	?	–	?
Marin	0	–	4	–	0	?	–	?	–	?
Championship: San Jose State 21, San Mateo 21
+ – Conference co-champions

The 1928 Santa Barbara State Roadrunners football team represented Santa Barbara State (Note: University of California, Santa Barbara was known as Santa Barbara State College from 1921 to 1943.) during the 1928 college football season.

Santa Barbara State competed in the California Coast Conference (CCC) from 1927–1928. The conference disbanded after the 1928 season, and the Roadrunners competed as an Independent the following two years. The 1928 Roadrunners were led by first-year head coach Harold Davis and played home games at Peabody Stadium in Santa Barbara, California. They finished the season with a record of four wins and five losses (4–5, 2–2 CCC). Overall, the team was outscored by its opponents 43–96 for the season and was shut out in all five of the losses.

== Schedule ==
Date	Opponent	Site	Result	Source
September 22	UCLA*	Moore Field; Los Angeles, CA	L 0–19	
September 29	Santa Maria*	Peabody Stadium; Santa Barbara, CA	W 7–0	
October 6	at Fresno State*	Fresno State College Stadium; Fresno, CA	L 0–7	
October 13	Marin	Peabody Stadium; Santa Barbara, CA	W 24–6	
October 20	California Christian*	Peabody Stadium; Santa Barbara, CA	W 6–0	
October 27	at San Mateo	San Mateo, CA	L 0–25	
November 3	at Northern Arizona*	Skidmore Field; Flagstaff AZ	L 0–33	
November 10	Cal Poly	Peabody Stadium; Santa Barbara, CA	W 6–0	
November 17	at San Jose State	Spartan Field; San Jose, CA	L 0–6	
*Non-conference game
