= 1928 San Jose State Spartans football team =

American college football season

1928 San Jose State Spartans football

CCC co-champion

CCC Championship Game, T 21–21 vs. San Mateo Junior College
- Conference: California Coast Conference
- Record: 6–2–1 (6–2 CCC)
- Head coach: Ernesto R. Knollin (5th season)
- Home stadium: Spartan Field

1928 California Coast Conference football standings
| | Conf. | | | | | Overall |
| Team | W | | L | | T | W | | L | | T |
|---|---|---|---|---|---|---|---|---|---|---|
| San Mateo + | 7 | – | 0 | – | 0 | ? | – | ? | – | ? |
| San Jose State + | 6 | – | 2 | – | 0 | 6 | – | 2 | – | 1 |
| Modesto | 5 | – | 2 | – | 1 | 5 | – | 3 | – | 1 |
| Sacramento | 3 | – | 2 | – | 0 | ? | – | ? | – | ? |
| Cal Poly | 1 | – | 2 | – | 1 | 3 | – | 4 | – | 2 |
| Santa Barbara State | 1 | – | 2 | – | 0 | 4 | – | 5 | – | 0 |
| Chico State | 1 | – | 4 | – | 0 | 2 | – | 6 | – | 0 |
| Santa Rosa | 2 | – | 5 | – | 0 | ? | – | ? | – | ? |
| Marin | 0 | – | 4 | – | 0 | ? | – | ? | – | ? |
Championship: San Jose State 21, San Mateo 21
+ – Conference co-champions

The 1928 San Jose State Spartans football team represented State Teachers College at San Jose (Note: San Jose State University was known as State Teachers College at San Jose from 1921 to 1934.) during the 1928 college football season.

San Jose State competed in the last year of the California Coast Conference (CCC). They had been a member since 1922, and would move to the Far Western Conference (FWC) in 1929. The team was led by fifth-year head coach Ernesto R. Knollin, and they played home games at Spartan Field in San Jose, California. The team finished the season with a record of six wins, two losses and one tie (6–2–1, 6–2 CCC). The Spartans outscored their opponents 123–64 for the season.

The CCC championship game was a rematch of the Spartans earlier loss vs. San Mateo Junior College. In the rematch, San Jose State tied San Mateo 21–21.

== Schedule ==
| Date | Opponent | Site | Result | Source |
|---|---|---|---|---|
| October 6 (Note: This game is missing from the 2016 San Jose State Media Guide.) | Sacramento | Mission Field; Santa Clara, CA | W 6–0 | |
| October 13 | San Mateo | Spartan Field; San Jose, CA | L 14–24 | |
| October 20 | at Cal Poly | San Luis Obispo, CA | W 6–0 | |
| October 27 | Chico State | Spartan Field; San Jose, CA | W 6–0 | |
| November 3 | Marin | Spartan Field; San Jose, CA | W 26–0 | |
| November 17 | Santa Barbara State | Spartan Field; San Jose, CA | W 6–0 | |
| November 23 | at Santa Rosa | Santa Rosa, CA | W 32–6 | |
| November 29 | Modesto | Spartan Field; San Jose, CA | L 6–13 | |
| December 12 | San Mateo* | Spartan Field; San Jose, CA (CCC Championship Game) | T 21–21 | |
*Non-conference game
