= 1928 Chico State Wildcats football team =

American college football season

1928 Chico State Wildcats football
- Conference: California Coast Conference
- Record: 2–6 (1–4 CCC)
- Head coach: Art Acker (6th season)
- Home stadium: College Field

1928 California Coast Conference football standings
	Conf.					Overall
Team	W		L		T	W		L		T
San Mateo +	7	–	0	–	0	?	–	?	–	?
San Jose State +	6	–	2	–	0	6	–	2	–	1
Modesto	5	–	2	–	1	5	–	3	–	1
Sacramento	3	–	2	–	0	?	–	?	–	?
Cal Poly	1	–	2	–	1	3	–	4	–	2
Santa Barbara State	1	–	2	–	0	4	–	5	–	0
Chico State	1	–	4	–	0	2	–	6	–	0
Santa Rosa	2	–	5	–	0	?	–	?	–	?
Marin	0	–	4	–	0	?	–	?	–	?
Championship: San Jose State 21, San Mateo 21
+ – Conference co-champions

The 1928 Chico State Wildcats football team represented Chico State Teachers College—now known as California State University, Chico—as a member of the California Coast Conference (CCC) during the 1928 college football season. Led by sixth-year head coach Art Acker, Chico State compiled an overall record of 2–6 with a mark of 1–4 in conference play, placing eighth in the CCC. The team was outscored by its opponents 118 to 105 for the season. The Wildcats played home games at College Field in Chico, California.

This was Chico State's last season in the CCC. They joined the Far Western Conference (FWC)—later known as the Northern California Athletic Conference (NCAC)—in 1929 and remained a member until the school eliminated the football program after the 1996 season.

== Schedule ==
Date	Time	Opponent	Site	Result	Source
October 6		at Pacific (CA)*	C.O.P. Field; Stockton, CA	L 0–14	
October 13		Cal Aggies*	College Field; Chico, CA	L 0–22	
October 20		at Modesto	Morris Field; Modesto, CA	L 6–31	
October 27		at San Jose State	Spartan Field; San Jose, CA	L 6–12	
November 3		Oregon Normal*	College Field; Chico, CA	W 38–0	
November 10	2:30 p.m.	at Sacramento	Sacramento Stadium; Sacramento, CA	L 13–14	
November 17		at San Mateo	Burlingame High School; Burlingame, CA	L 12–25	
November 29		Cal Poly	College Field; Chico, CA	W 30–0	
*Non-conference game; All times are in Pacific time
