= The Bride and the Beast (disambiguation) =

The Bride and the Beast is a 1958 film by Ed Wood.

The Bride and the Beast may also refer to:

- The Bride and the Beast (novel), by Teresa Medeiros (2001)
- The Bride and the Beast (RiffTrax)
