= Theresa Brown =

Theresa Brown may refer to:

- Theresa Wiggin, a character in the Ender's Game series
- Theresa Brown (author), American author
