= Isabel Grenfell Quallo =

American community activist (1893–1985)

- Quallo, circa 1940
- Born: Grace Isabel Grenfell; 4 April 1893; Léopoldville, Congo Free State
- Died: 21 September 1985 (aged 92); New York City, New York
- Other name: Grace Quallo
- Occupations: domestic, waitress, community activist
- Partner: Elsa Gidlow
- Children: 8
- Father: George Grenfell

Isabel Grenfell Quallo (4 April 1893 – 21 September 1985) was a Congolese-born British-American domestic worker and community activist known for her involvement in the development of Druid Heights, in Marin County, California. Born in the Congo Free State, she was educated in England and then moved with her mother to Kingston, Jamaica. Marrying at 16, she immigrated with her husband to New York City in 1914. Struggling with racism and her husband's mental illness, she supported her children by working as a domestic and waitress. Through contacts in the theater district, she made the acquaintance of writer Elsa Gidlow, becoming her lover for ten years. In their last two years together, Elsa purchased 5 acres of land south of Muir Woods. She then split the property with builder and jazz musician Roger Somers, and his wife Mary, and, initially with Isabel's help, they fostered an atmosphere which would attract many of those involved in countercultural movements, active in the United States between 1950 and 1970.

== Early life ==
Grace Isabel Grenfell was born on 4 April 1893 in Léopoldville (Note: Some sources report that Grenfell was born in 1896 and her place of birth is variously listed as Bolobo or Penzance, Cornwall, England. A letter written by her father to her sister Carrie in 1898, advising that "Grace" was attending school and learning her letters, indicate 1893 is the more likely birth year. According to the 1901 census, her parents, who were the most likely people to know where the birth occurred, gave Grenfell's place of birth as Léopoldville.) in the Congo Free State to Patience Rosanna Edgerley and George Grenfell. Grenfell's father was a missionary and explorer, who mapped the territory of the Congo Basin, including Mount Cameroon and the Lungasi, Mungo, Sanga Yabiang, and Wouri Rivers, opening it up to mission work. After his first wife died, Grenfell began an affair with his housekeeper, Patience, who he soon married. Her mother was the daughter of Jamaican missionaries who had come to West Africa to establish a Baptist mission in 1843. She was born in Fernando Po, Equatorial Guinea. After her marriage in Victoria, Cameroon, Patience had eight children with Grenfell. "Isabel", as she was known, was the youngest daughter of the four sisters who survived. She began her education in Bolobo in 1898, but by 1903 had joined her older sisters Carrie and Gertrude, who were attending school at Walthamstow Hall in Sevenoaks, Kent. Her teacher at Walthamstow, was Emily Mary Watts, mother of the writer Alan Watts. Their older sister Patience had already graduated and returned to the Congo in 1897, but died two years later.

George Grenfell died on 1 July 1906 in Basoko in the Congo Free State and the family lived briefly in Cornwall near George's family, until it was suggested that they relocate. In 1908, his widow moved to Kingston, Jamaica with Isabel. Both Carrie and Gertrude followed the family and joined them later in Jamaica. On 15 August 1909, Isabel married Arthur Hubert Quallo, in Saint Catherine Parish, Jamaica. Her husband was of African, Jewish, and Spanish descent and operated a hotel. The couple had two daughters, Yolanda (born 1910) and Patience (born 1911) and a set of twin daughters (born 1912) before moving to New York City, in 1914. Four more children followed in New York: Grace Olivia (1915–1917), George (1917), Phyllis (1919), and Arthur (1922). The marriage was not a happy one for Quallo, and by 1928, her husband was confined in the Dannemora State Hospital, suffering from mental illness.

== Career ==
Quallo's education, focused on preparation to become a wife, needlework, and dancing, had not given her the skills to support her children adequately. Her husband had spent largely and left no savings. Needing to provide for her large family, she took a position as a domestic worker in the home of a clergyman. She eventually left the job for a better-paying position as a waitress in the theater district and had a fifteen-year relationship with another woman beginning in the early 1930s. Her mother died in 1928, her last living sibling died in 1930, and her husband died in 1935.

In 1946, through mutual friends, Quallo was introduced to the writer, Elsa Gidlow, but because Gidlow lived in California and Quallo lived in New York, the two women's relationship began by correspondence. Quallo wrote the first letter and explained in her correspondences, her background, her difficult adjustment to life in the United States because of the prevalent segregation policies, and her relationships. Gidlow soon invited Quallo to come visit and by the middle of 1947, Quallo had come to California, unsure of how long her stay would be. She was concerned about difficulties that might arise because of their association and expressed them to Gidlow saying, "A woman who discovers she is a lesbian and is a visible member of a minority has three strikes against her". Gidlow assured Quallo that her community was open-minded and there would not be problems. Their friendship quickly turned into a romance, which would last for the next ten years.

Quallo moved in to Gidlow's home in Fairfax, Marin County, California. She joined in intellectual evenings hosted there with students and faculty from the American Academy of Asian Studies. The couple came under scrutiny of the California Senate Factfinding Subcommittee on Un-American Activities for their interracial association, as well as their contacts with Chinese friends. Elsa was investigated during a nationally reported hearing and cleared of all charges. When Gidlow's mother, Alice May, suffered a stroke and needed permanent care, Quallo agreed to assist her, as she had previously worked as a nurse's aid. They moved Alice in to their home and installed her in a downstairs room fitted with a hospital bed. Quallo provided the constant care Alice needed for the last 9 months of her life, while Gidlow worked as a journalist to provide their support.

In 1954, hoping to escape from the increasing urbanization of Fairfax, Gidlow bought a 5-acre property in rural Marin County near Muir Woods. Gidlow wanted to create a community for her varied friends and felt that the atmosphere in Fairfax had shifted. The property had been found by Roger Somers and his wife Mary, but they did not have the funds to make the purchase. Despite the inability of single women to obtain credit at the time, Gidlow was able to borrow funds, after her friend Dorothy Erskine collateralized the loan. Elsa then legally split the property with the Somers. After the death of their close friend, Ella Young, in 1956, Elsa named her portion Druid Heights. Both couples moved onto their respective separate properties shortly before the summer solstice of 1954.

Both groups renovated the houses on their individual properties. Together they repaired the common piped water system for the buildings and future gardens which came from the local spring and had previously served the former chicken ranch. Along with other nearby residents, they all maintained the three mile dirt road which gave them all access to the land. The road demanded constant upkeep, particularly in severe rainstorms. For the first few years, Quallo helped develop the property, which later became a mecca for counter-cultural figures and feminists.[40] In 1957, she returned to Manhattan to care for two of her daughters who were having health issues.

== Death and legacy ==
Quallo died on 21 September 1985 in New York City. The letters she wrote to Gidlow are maintained in the archives of the GLBT Historical Society in San Francisco.
