= Druid Heights =

Counterculture enclave in Marin County, California

- Counterculture Enclave
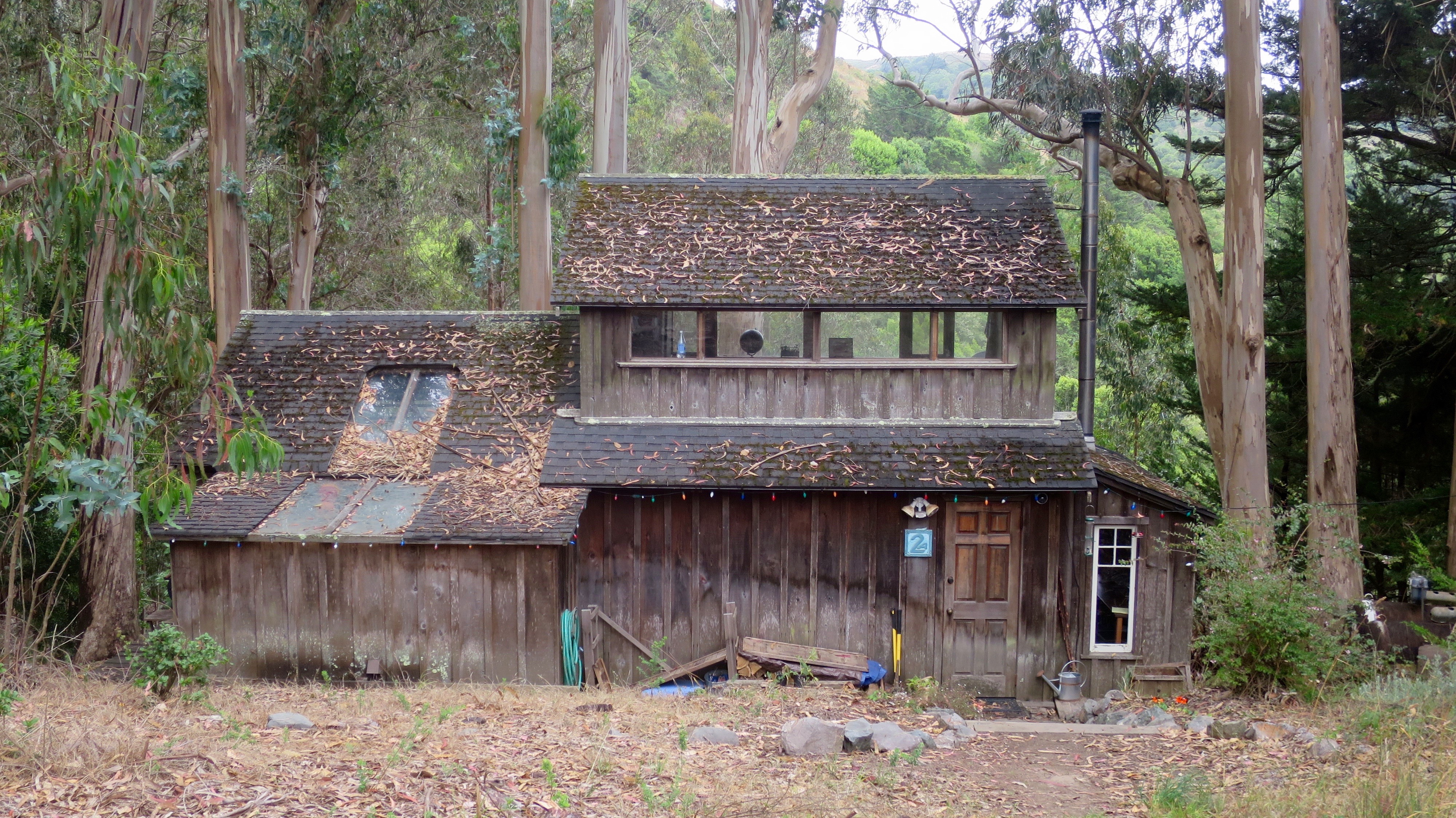

- Location in California
- Coordinates: 37°53′21.174″N 122°33′52.9596″W
- Founder: Elsa Gidlow,

Druid Heights was a counterculture enclave in Marin County, California, U.S. that lasted through most of the last half of the 20th century. Poet Elsa Gidlow purchased the property near the Muir Woods National Monument in 1954. She split the land with Roger and Mary Somers. In 1956, Elsa named her portion Druid Heights. Today the entire site is called by this moniker although in reality the enclave's neighbors seldom used the name. The community was not a monolith. Residents of the enclave shared common values and responsibilities concomitant with the remote site's lack of services. It had no city water system, no sewers, and no city maintenance for the enclave's three-mile-long dirt road. The enclave's 12 residents and others living along the road pooled money and resources to maintain these vital services. These challenges demanded they work together in harmony. The remoteness and uniqueness of the site attracted members of various countercultural movements and many figures of the San Francisco Renaissance.

== History ==
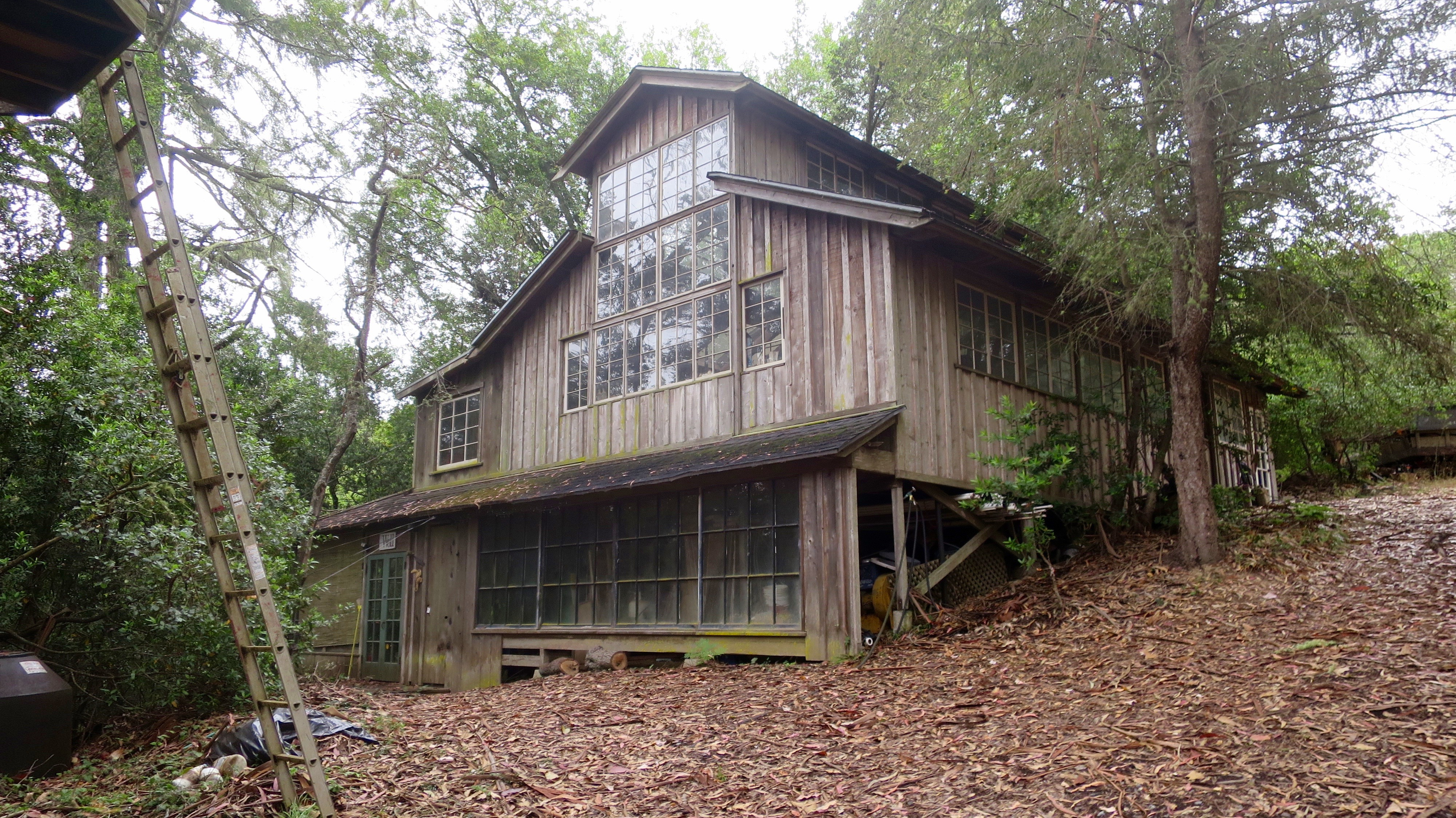

Druid Heights was, by its founder Elsa Gidlow, jokingly called an "unintentional" community located on the southeast flank of Mount Tamalpais in Marin County, California, about a mile from the Pacific Ocean. The property was initially inhabited by carpenter Roger Somers and poet Elsa Gidlow, along with their partners, on five acres of a former chicken ranch. Gidlow purchased the acreage and then legally split the parcel in 1954 so she could share it with carpenter Roger Somers and his wife Mary. In 1956, Elsa gave her portion, approximately two acres, the name Druid Heights in honor of two female writers, the revolutionary and teacher of Irish lore, Ella Young (the Druid), and Emily Brontë, author of Wuthering Heights.

The community members, sometimes separately and other times together, allowed the acreage to be a meeting place for three countercultural movements in the United States, including the Beat Generation of the 1950s, the hippie movement of the 1960s, and the women's movement of the 1970s. It also, through the efforts of Elsa Gidlow, became a refuge for many famous figures of the San Francisco Renaissance including her friends Kenneth Rexroth and former resident of the Heights, Pulitzer Prize winner Gary Snyder.

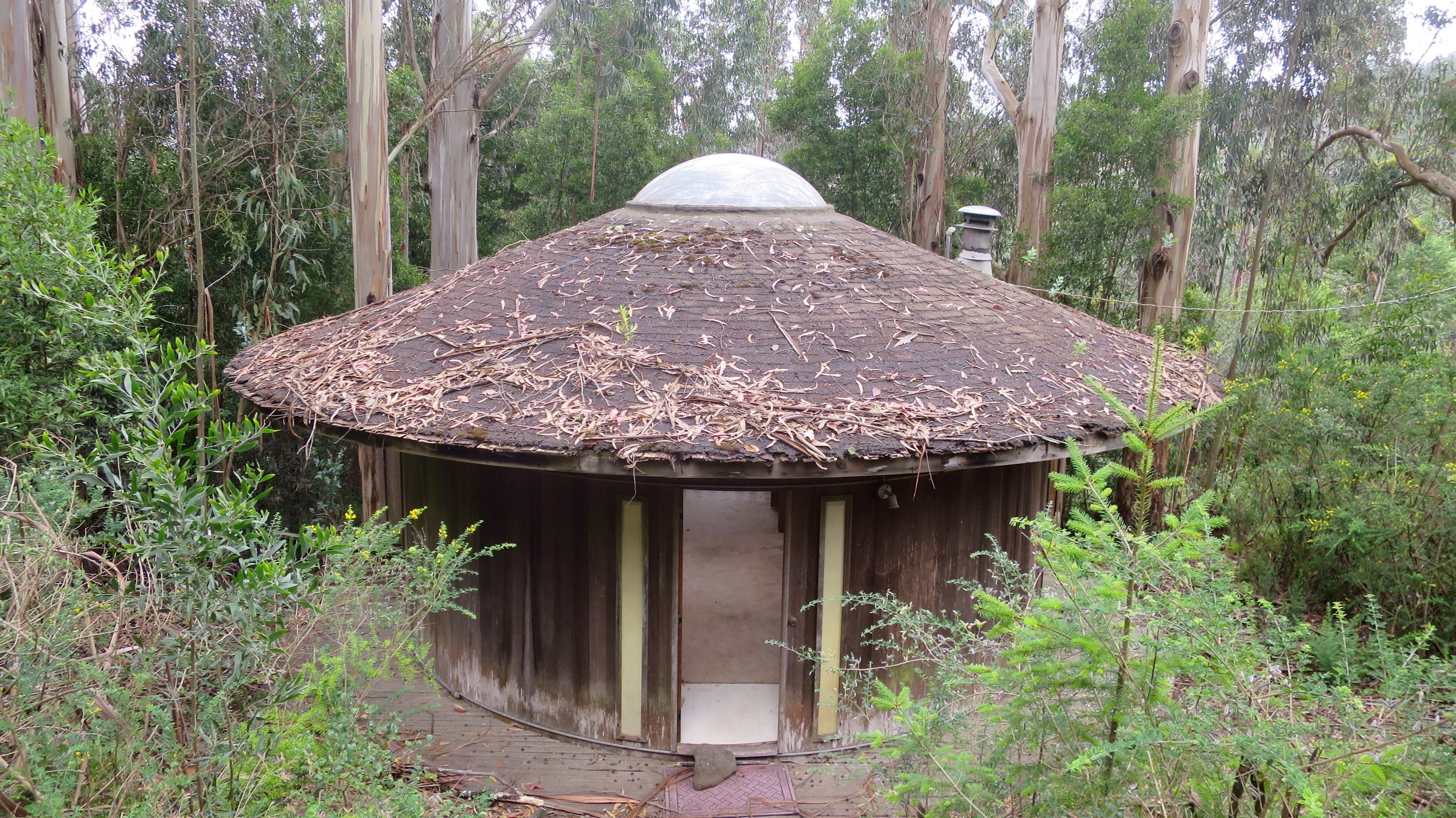
The Alan Watts Library

Accessible by a dirt road connected to Muir Woods Road, the two properties occupied a now split five-acre ranch formerly known as the Haapa Property. On his portion, Somers worked as a free spirited and hard working craftsman, influenced by Japanese architecture and American architect Frank Lloyd Wright. He built or remodeled many of the structures with the help of organizational skills and commonsense from Ed Stiles, a furniture designer who later became the property's third owner. Gidlow was fond of decorative gardening and organic agriculture, and she grew vegetables for herself and shared the excess with other people in the area.

Seeing a broader purpose for her portion of the land, The Society For Comparative Philosophy, begun in 1962, established itself here as a non-profit by Elsa Gidlow and Alan Watts. It aimed for a broad vision approach to "studies of humanity's relation to nature and the universe." They purchased the converted ferry boat Vallejo to "be headquarters for the Society and site of seminars and other events," and so the Heights could be kept a closely guarded secret enjoyed only by insiders and invited guests. The Society fell on hard times after the 1973 death of Alan Watts, but in his name and with the help of a solid board of directors, it revived and continued until Gidlow's death in 1987.

Gidlow once planned to turn Druid Heights into a pay-as-you-go retreat for artists, but after the National Park Service acquired the land using eminent domain in 1977, it could no longer host temporary guests, only legal tenants. Located above Muir Woods National Monument, Druid Heights was acquired by the National Park Service in the 1970s and is now on the National Register of Historic Places.

== Buildings and structures ==
"With [Gidlow's] skill as a gardener and [Somers'] as an architect they transformed this area into a paradise, a Garden of Eden...All this they accomplished with imagination and muscle...It has what people who are only rich find so frustrating, because you cannot buy it with money."

— Alan Watts

There are approximately 16 historic buildings and structures in what is today commonly called Druid Heights with the most important structure, poet Elsa Gidlow's own house, seriously endangered due to a lack of maintenance. Remaining structures include:

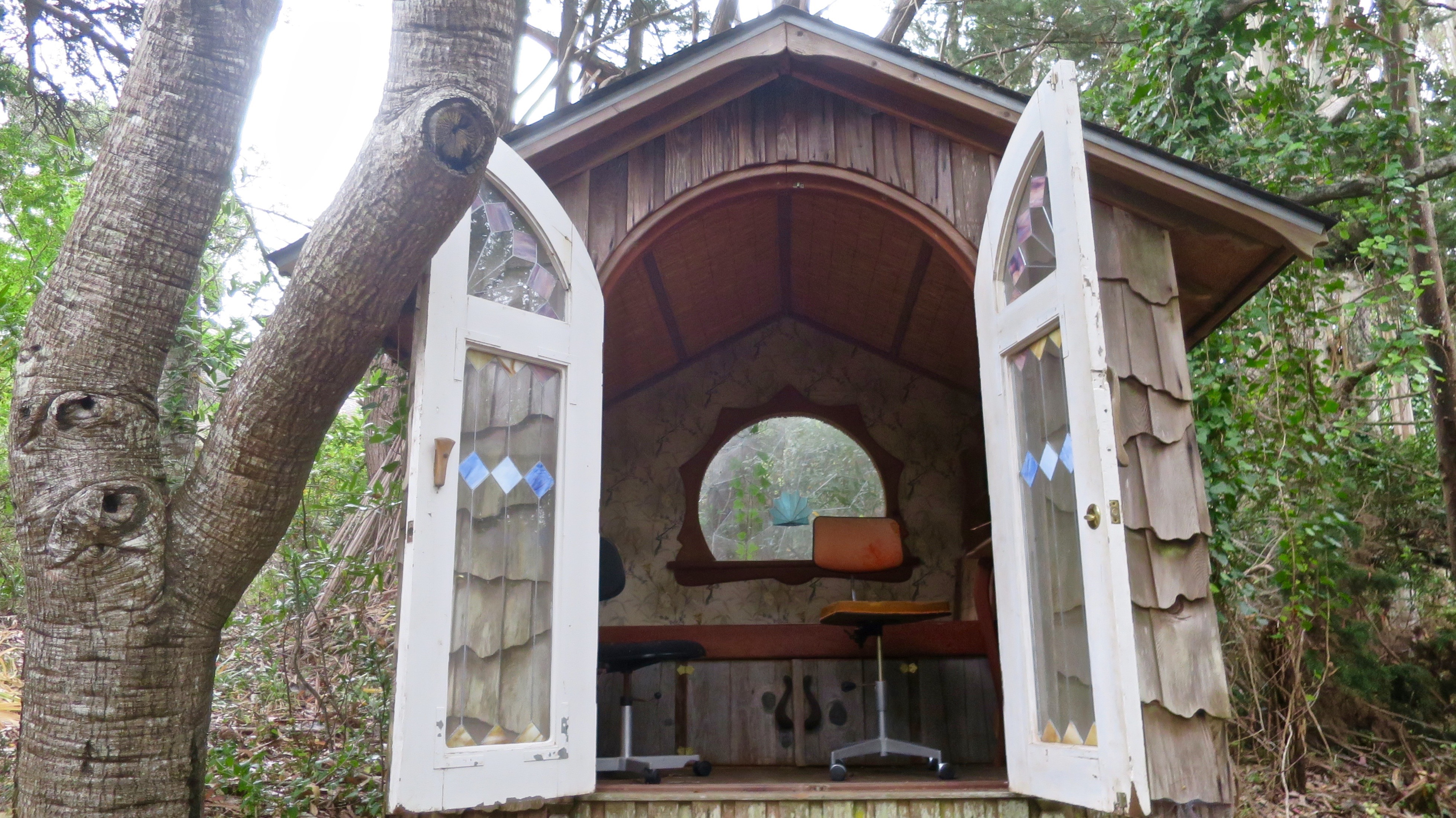
The Goddess Meditation Hut

- Cloud Hidden, a large rock named by Alan Watts.
- The Library, constructed in 1972 out of a redwood water tank, initially to house the books and papers of Alan Watts.
- Mandala House, a cabin shaped like a lotus flower. It was originally built by Stiles for Elsa Gidlow's sister, then improved and rented to Alan and Jano Watts from 1970 until his death there in 1973.
- The Goddess Meditation hut with stained glass windows.
- Love Garden, filled with plants brought there by Gidlow from her other house, 'Madrona' in Fairfax, California and tended by Gidlow with the help of countless friends.
- Water Tank, installed under the supervision of Edward Stiles to hold water pumped from the creek for the benefit, communally, of the 12 residents.
- The Ranch or Twin Peaks House, was originally a small house built in early 1920s by Alfons Haapa. After the purchase of the Haapa property by Gidlow and Roger and Mary Somers in 1954, Somers’ extensive remodeling and additions radically remade this house by incorporating elements of Japanese, Polynesian and Modern Architecture.
- The Old Chicken Barn, built to house chickens by Alfons Haapa in 1943, was converted by Roger Somers and his tenant sculptor Jerry Walter into a combination art studio and dwelling in the late 1950s. After the arrival of the Stiles family in 1965, Ed Stiles continued to remodel and add to this building, including the bathroom's incorporation of a custom redwood tub and shower.

== Residents ==
- Robert Erickson
- Elsa Gidlow
- Echo Heron
- Isabel Quallo
- Gary Snyder
- Roger and Mary Somers
- Ed Stiles
- Marilyn Stiles
- Seth Stiles
- Wyeth Stiles
- Margo St. James
- Alan Watts
- David Wills

== Depiction in media ==
Marcy Mendelson directed and produced a documentary about the location called Druid Heights, and stated that the location was a vortex of social and artistic energy.

== See also ==
- Redwood Creek
