= 1928 New Mexico Lobos football team =

American college football season

1928 New Mexico Lobos football
- Conference: Independent
- Record: 5–2–1
- Head coach: Roy W. Johnson (9th season)
- Captains: John Dolzadelli; John P. McFarland
- Home stadium: University Field

1928 Western college football independents records
	Conf.			Overall
Team	W	L	T	W		L		T
Arizona		–		5	–	1	–	2
Idaho Southern Branch		–		5	–	1	–	2
Gonzaga		–		6	–	2	–	1
New Mexico		–		5	–	2	–	1
Humboldt State		–		2	–	1	–	0
Loyola (CA)		–		5	–	3	–	0
Tempe State		–		3	–	2	–	1
Regis		–		5	–	4	–	0
Santa Clara		–		5	–	4	–	0
New Mexico A&M		–		4	–	5	–	0
Hawaii		–		2	–	5	–	0

The 1928 New Mexico Lobos football team represented the University of New Mexico as an independent during the 1928 college football season. In their ninth season under head coach Roy W. Johnson, the Lobos compiled a 5–2–1 record.

The loss to New Mexico Military on October 13 marked the end of a 13-game unbeaten streak (11 wins and 2 ties), a seven-game winning streak, and 12-game home winning streak. Those streaks remain the longest in school history.

In the team's October 6 victory over Montezuma College, M. Nelson set a school record with a 95-yard interception return. Nelson's return remains the fourth longest in school history through the end of the 2017 season.

Halfback John Dolzadelli and guard John P. "Jack" McFarland were the team captains. Dolzadelli was invited to play in the East–West Shrine Game at the end of the 1928 season; he was the first New Mexico player to be so honored.

== Schedule ==
Date	Opponent	Site	Result	Source
September 29	New Mexico Mines	University Field; Albuquerque, NM	W 45–0	
October 6	Montezuma College	University Field; Albuquerque, NM	W 36–0	
October 13	New Mexico Military	University Field; Albuquerque, NM	L 6–7	
October 20	at Northern Arizona	Skidmore Field; Flagstaff, AZ	L 0–12	
October 27	New Mexico A&M^{†}	University Field; Albuquerque, NM (rivalry)	W 14–13	
November 3	at Arizona	Arizona Stadium; Tucson, AZ (rivalry)	T 6–6	
November 17	Texas Mines	University Field; Albuquerque, NM	W 33–0	
November 29	Colorado Mines	University Field; Albuquerque, NM	W 32–13	
^{†}Homecoming
