= 1928 Pacific Tigers football team =

American college football season

1928 Pacific Tigers football
- Conference: Far Western Conference
- Record: 5–2 (2–1 FWC)
- Head coach: Erwin Righter (8th season)
- Home stadium: College of the Pacific Field

1928 Far Western Conference football standings
	Conf.					Overall
Team	W		L		T	W		L		T
Saint Mary's $	2	–	0	–	0	5	–	4	–	0
Cal Aggies	3	–	1	–	0	6	–	3	–	0
St. Ignatius (CA)	3	–	1	–	0	4	–	4	–	0
Pacific (CA)	2	–	1	–	0	5	–	2	–	0
Fresno State	0	–	3	–	1	2	–	5	–	1
Nevada	0	–	4	–	1	0	–	7	–	1
$ – Conference champion

The 1928 Pacific Tigers football team represented the College of the Pacific—now known as the University of the Pacific—in Stockton, California as a member of the Far Western Conference (FWC) during the 1928 college football season. The team was led by eighth-year head coach Erwin Righter, and played home games at a field on campus in Stockton. Pacific compiled an overall record of 5–2 with a mark of 2–1 in conference play, placing fourth in the FWC. The Tigers outscored their opponents 95–64 for the season.

== Schedule ==
Date	Opponent	Site	Result	Source
September 29	Modesto*	College of the Pacific Field; Stockton, CA	W 21–20	
October 6	Chico State*	College of the Pacific Field; Stockton, CA	W 14–0	
October 20	at Nevada	Mackay Stadium (Note: This stadium is the predecessor to the current Mackay Stadium, which was opened for the 1966 season.); Reno, NV	W 7–6	
October 27	Sacramento*	College of the Pacific Field; Stockton, CA	W 33–0	
November 3	Fresno State^{†}	College of the Pacific Field; Stockton, CA	W 13–0	
November 12	Cal Aggies	Sacramento Stadium; Sacramento, CA	L 0–26	
November 16	at Santa Clara*	Mission Field; Santa Clara, CA	L 7–12	
*Non-conference game; ^{†}Homecoming
