= 1928 Tempe State Bulldogs football team =

American college football season

1928 Tempe State Bulldogs football
- Conference: Independent
- Record: 3–2–1
- Head coach: Aaron McCreary (6th season)
- Home stadium: Irish Field

1928 Western college football independents records
	Conf.			Overall
Team	W	L	T	W		L		T
Arizona		–		5	–	1	–	2
Idaho Southern Branch		–		5	–	1	–	2
Gonzaga		–		6	–	2	–	1
New Mexico		–		5	–	2	–	1
Humboldt State		–		2	–	1	–	0
Loyola (CA)		–		5	–	3	–	0
Tempe State		–		3	–	2	–	1
Regis		–		5	–	4	–	0
Santa Clara		–		5	–	4	–	0
New Mexico A&M		–		4	–	5	–	0
Hawaii		–		2	–	5	–	0

The 1928 Tempe State Bulldogs football team was an American football team that represented Tempe State Teachers College (later renamed Arizona State University) as an independent during the 1928 college football season. In their sixth season under head coach Aaron McCreary, the Bulldogs compiled a 3–2–1 record and outscored their opponents by a combined total of 133 to 73. The team's games included a scoreless tie with UTEP and a 39–0 loss in the Arizona–Arizona State football rivalry. William Dick was the team captain.

== Schedule ==
Date	Opponent	Site	Result	Source
October 13	Gila College	Irish Field; Tempe, AZ	W 51–0	
October 15	at Texas Mines	El Paso High School Stadium; El Paso, TX	T 0–0	
October 20	at Arizona	Arizona Stadium; Tucson, AZ (rivalry)	L 0–6	
November 3	Phoenix Indian School	Irish Field; Tempe, AZ	W 19–6	
November 10	Northern Arizona	Irish Field; Tempe, AZ	L 6–27	
November 16	at Phoenix College	Phoenix, AZ	W 51–0	
