= 1928 St. Ignatius Gray Fog football team =

American football team that represented St. Ignatius College

1928 St. Ignatius Gray Fog football
- Conference: Far Western Conference
- Record: 4–4 (3–1 FWC)
- Head coach: Jimmy Needles (5th season)
- Home stadium: Kezar Stadium

1928 Far Western Conference football standings
	Conf.					Overall
Team	W		L		T	W		L		T
Saint Mary's $	2	–	0	–	0	5	–	4	–	0
Cal Aggies	3	–	1	–	0	6	–	3	–	0
St. Ignatius (CA)	3	–	1	–	0	4	–	4	–	0
Pacific (CA)	2	–	1	–	0	5	–	2	–	0
Fresno State	0	–	3	–	1	2	–	5	–	1
Nevada	0	–	4	–	1	0	–	7	–	1
$ – Conference champion

The 1928 St. Ignatius Gray Fog football team was an American football team that represented St. Ignatius College (later renamed the University of San Francisco) as a member of the Far Western Conference (FWC) during the 1928 college football season. In its fifth season under head coach Jimmy Needles, the Gray Fog compiled a 4–4 record, tied for second place in the FWC, and was outscored by a total of 99 to 63.

== Schedule ==
Date	Opponent	Site	Result	Attendance	Source
September 29	Nevada	Kezar Stadium; San Francisco, CA	W 12–0		
October 6	Santa Clara	Kezar Stadium; San Francisco, CA	L 0–33		
October 13	Fresno State	Kezar Stadium; San Francisco, CA	W 19–0		
October 20	at Loyola (CA)	Loyola Field; Los Angeles, CA	W 18–13		
October 27	Cal Aggies	Kezar Stadium; San Francisco, CA	W 14–0		
November 4	Saint Mary's	Kezar Stadium; San Francisco, CA	L 0–13		
November 11	Olympic Club	Kezar Stadium; San Francisco, CA	L 0–13		
November 17	Gonzaga	Kezar Stadium; San Francisco, CA	L 0–27	5,000	
