= Robert Erickson (furniture designer) =

Robert Erickson (born 1947 in Lincoln, Nebraska) is an American furniture designer and woodworker in Nevada City, California. He is a studio maker, who custom designs chairs and other furniture. His work is in several U.S. national collections.

== Career ==
After leaving University of Nebraska with an English degree in 1969, Erickson traveled to Druid Heights in Marin County, California to study with furniture makers Ed Stiles and Roger Somers. In the summer of 1970, Erickson was employed by Pulitzer Prize-winning poet Gary Snyder, said to be inspiration for Jack Kerouac's The Dharma Bums. His role was to help hand-build a Japanese and Native American-inspired home in Nevada County, California. Erickson Woodworking was established next to Snyder's property the same year when he bought a plot of land to build his workshop, and he also sold his first chair. The wood shop has operated in this location since that time – now with the addition of solar power and phone lines. Most of Erickson's chairs incorporate the "contoured floating back" design, which he began incorporating into his chairs in 1974. Robert Erickson is married to Liese Greensfelder, a science writer who also helps to manage the business. Their son Tor is now a full partner in the business of Erickson Woodworking.

== Permanent collections ==
His work is part of the permanent collection of the Smithsonian American Art Museum, Yale University Art Gallery and Los Angeles County Museum of Art, and the Racine Museum of Art.
