= Roswell George Mills =

Canadian journalist, poet and magazine publisher

- Born: July 4, 1896; Buffalo, New York
- Died: May 5, 1966 (aged 69); Miami, Florida
- Occupations: journalist, poet
- Partner(s): Graeme Davis; Khagendrenath Ghose
- Writing career
- Period: 1900s-1940s
- Notable work: Les Mouches Fantastiques

Roswell George Mills (1896 - 1966) was a Canadian journalist, poet and magazine publisher. A friend and colleague of poet Elsa Gidlow, he is the first known gay man in Canadian history whose life and sexual orientation is attested through biographical literature rather than court records of a sodomy trial.

Born in Buffalo, New York, on July 4, 1896, Mills moved to Montreal, Quebec, in childhood with his family.

In early adulthood Mills worked as a journalist for the Montreal Star, where his byline appeared on the financial pages and as a theatre and opera critic. He also wrote a women's column under the pseudonym "Jessie Roberts". He and Gidlow met at a poetry club. According to Gidlow,

He was beautiful. About nineteen, exquisitely made up, slightly perfumed, dressed in ordinary men's clothing but a little on the chi-chi side. And he swayed about, you know. We became friends almost instantly because we were both interested in poetry and the arts.

Mills was open about his sexuality and considered it a personal crusade to make people "understand that it was beautiful, not evil, to love others of one's own sex and make love with them." Between 1918 and 1920 Mills and Gidlow collaborated on the underground magazine Les Mouches fantastiques, Canada's first known LGBT publication. Mills published several poems in the magazine. An Episcopalian priest from South Dakota, Graeme Davis, took leave from his church posting and moved to Montreal to become Mills' lover after discovering the magazine.

Mills also gave piano lessons.

Mills followed Gidlow in the early 1920s to New York City, where he took a job in the financial section of the Oil, Paint, and Drug Reporter. He soon ended his relationship with Davis and moved in with Khagendrenath Ghose, an immigrant from India. He subsequently lost contact with Gidlow for a number of years, although they met again in Paris in 1928, where Mills was living with a German architecture student named Jurgen. Mills, Gidlow and Jurgen all travelled to Berlin in 1929, discovering the city's burgeoning gay subculture and touring Magnus Hirschfeld's Institute for Sex Research. Gidlow later moved back to the United States while Mills remained in Europe, although the two continued to correspond.

By 1943, Mills was again living in New York City and working for The Brooklyn Eagle. By 1961 he was living in Miami, Florida, where he died on May 5, 1966.
