= 1928 Cal Aggies football team =

American college football season

1928 Cal Aggies football
- Conference: Far Western Conference
- Record: 6–3 (3–1 FWC)
- Head coach: Crip Toomey (1st season)
- Captain: Kermit Schmidt
- Home stadium: Sacramento Stadium

1928 Far Western Conference football standings
	Conf.					Overall
Team	W		L		T	W		L		T
Saint Mary's $	2	–	0	–	0	5	–	4	–	0
Cal Aggies	3	–	1	–	0	6	–	3	–	0
St. Ignatius (CA)	3	–	1	–	0	4	–	4	–	0
Pacific (CA)	2	–	1	–	0	5	–	2	–	0
Fresno State	0	–	3	–	1	2	–	5	–	1
Nevada	0	–	4	–	1	0	–	7	–	1
$ – Conference champion

The 1928 Cal Aggies football team represented the Northern Branch of the College of Agriculture—now known as the University of California, Davis—as a member of the Far Western Conference (FWC) during the 1928 college football season. Led by first-year head coach Crip Toomey, the Aggies compiled an overall record of 6–3 with a mark of 3–1 in conference play, tying for second place in the FWC. The team outscored its opponents 91 to 41 for the season with five of their victories coming via shutout. The Cal Aggies played home games at Sacramento Stadium in Sacramento, California.

== Schedule ==
Date	Time	Opponent	Site	Result	Attendance	Source
September 29		at Oregon State*	Bell Field; Corvallis, OR	L 0–14		
October 6		at BYU*	Cougar Stadium (Note: This stadium is the predecessor to the current Cougar Stadium on the BYU campus, which was opened for the 1964 season); Provo, UT	L 6–7	3,000	
October 13		at Chico State*	College field; Chico, CA	W 22–0		
October 20	2:30 p.m.	vs. Sacramento*	Sacramento Stadium; Sacramento, CA	W 12–6		
October 27		at St. Ignatius (CA)	Kezar Stadium; San Francisco, CA	L 0–14		
November 3	2:30 p.m.	Nevada	Sacramento Stadium; Sacramento, CA	W 6–0		
November 12		Pacific (CA)	Sacramento Stadium; Sacramento, CA	W 26–0		
November 17		at Loyola (CA)*	Loyola Field; Los Angeles, CA	W 6–0		
November 29		at Fresno State	Fresno State College Stadium; Fresno, CA	W 13–0		
*Non-conference game; All times are in Pacific time
