= Ted Coffman =

American football, basketball, and baseball coach and college athletics administrator

Playing career

Football
- 1926: USC

Baseball
- 1925–1927: USC
- Positions: End (football); Catcher (baseball)

Coaching career (HC unless noted)

Football
- 1927–1928: New Mexico A&M

Basketball
- 1927–1929: New Mexico A&M

Baseball
- 1928: New Mexico A&M

Administrative career (AD unless noted)
- 1927–1929: New Mexico A&M

Head coaching record
- Overall: 7–10 (football); 9–20–1 (basketball); 4–4–1 (baseball)

Theodore R. "Soapy" Coffman was an American football, basketball, and baseball coach and college athletics administrator. Coffman served as the head football coach at New Mexico College of Agriculture and Mechanic Arts—now New Mexico State University—from 1927 to 1928, compiling a record of 7–10. At New Mexico A&M was also the head basketball coach from 1927 to 1928 and head baseball coach in 1928, and athletic director from 1927 to 1929. A native of Santa Ana, California, Coffman played college football and college baseball at the University of Southern California (USC).

== Head coaching record ==
=== Football ===
Year	Team	Overall	Conference	Standing	Bowl/playoffs
New Mexico A&M Aggies (Independent) (1927–1928)
1927	New Mexico A&M	3–5			
1928	New Mexico A&M	4–5			
New Mexico A&M:		7–10			
Total:		7–10			
