= Elsa Gidlow =

American poet

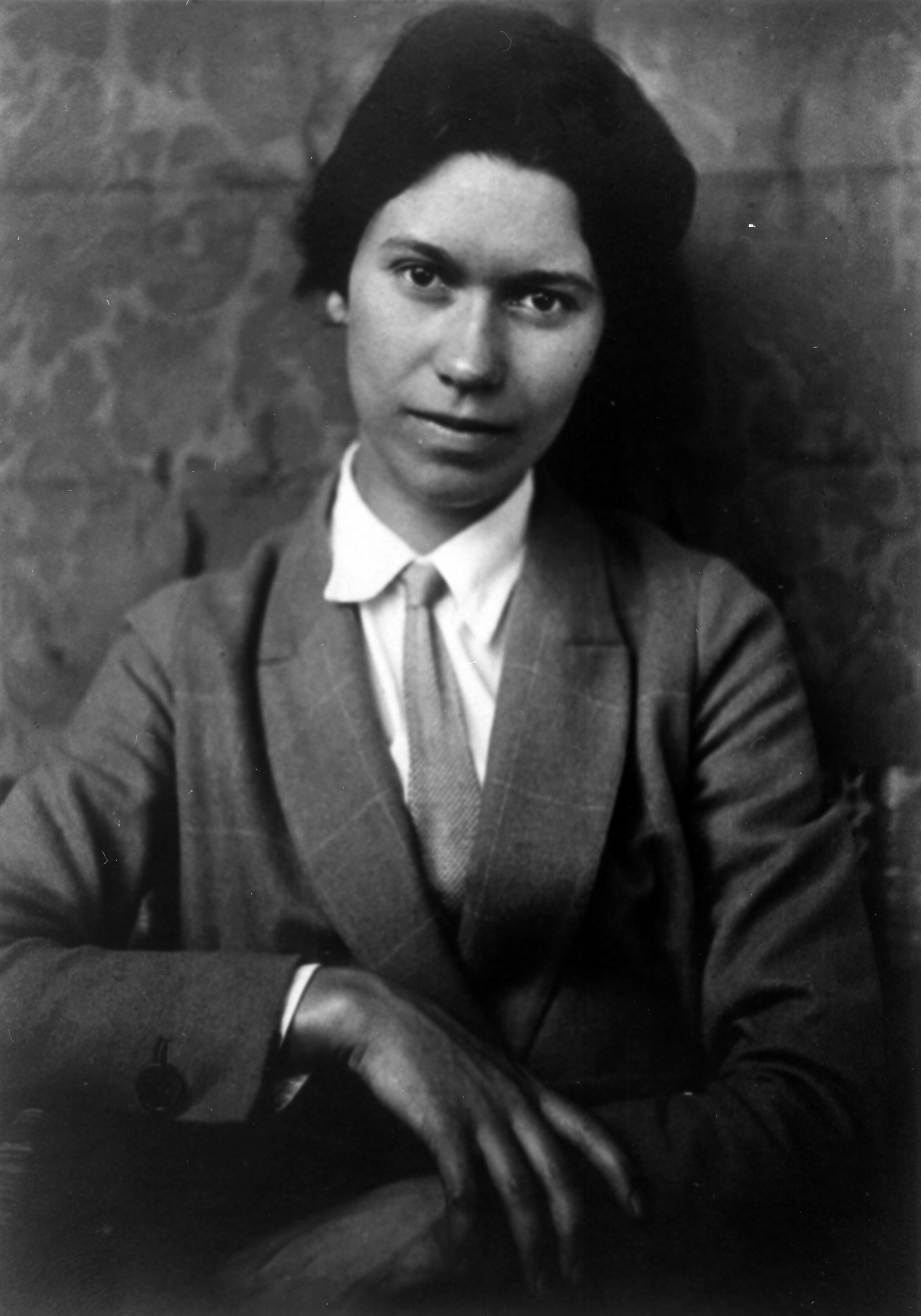
- Gidlow c. 1920s
- Born: Elsie Alice Gidlow; 29 December 1898; Hull, Yorkshire, England
- Died: 8 June 1986 (aged 87); Mill Valley, California, U.S.
- Education: Self-educated
- Occupations: Poet; author; editor; journalist; political activist; philosopher
- Partner(s): Isabel Grenfell Quallo (1945–1964) "Tommy" Violet Henry-Anderson (1924–1935†); Muriel Symington (1922)
- Writing career
- Period: 1917–1986
- Genres: Love poetry, essays, autobiography
- Subjects: Love, beauty, politics, protest, mysticism, nature
- Notable works: On A Grey Thread (1923); Elsa, I Come with My Songs (1986)
- Literary movement: Lesbian literature Feminist literature

Elsa Gidlow (29 December 1898 – 8 June 1986) was a British-born, Canadian-American poet, freelance journalist, philosopher and humanitarian. She is best known for writing On a Grey Thread (1923), the first volume of openly lesbian love poetry published in North America. In the 1950s, Gidlow helped found Druid Heights, a bohemian community in Marin County, California. She was the author of thirteen books and appeared as herself in the documentary film, Word Is Out: Stories of Some of Our Lives (1977). Completed just before her death, her autobiography, Elsa, I Come with My Songs (1986), recounts her life story. It is the first complete-life, lesbian autobiography published where the author "outs" herself and does not employ a pseudonym.

== Early life ==
Elsa Gidlow was born Elsie Alice Gidlow on 29 December 1898, at 9 Wells Terrace, Great Thornton Street, Hull, Yorkshire, England. Her father, Samuel A. Gidlow, was a railway safety clerk from Nottingham, her mother, Alice May (née Reichardt) Gidlow, the daughter of a German immigrant tailor. By 1901, the family had moved to a new house, 183 Clumber Street. In 1904, Samuel Gidlow emigrated to Canada. Alice, young Elsie and her brother Samuel joined him the following year. They settled in Tétreaultville, Montreal. Elsa had six siblings: Thea, Ivy, Stanley, Ruby, Eric, and Phyllis, whom she referred to as her "unfortunate family," because of their intimate association with mental illness. At the age of 15, Gidlow was first employed by her father on the Canadian Railway, and later by a contact of her father's in Montreal, a factory doctor, as assistant editor to Factory Facts, an in-house magazine.

== Career ==
In 1917, she began seeking out fellow writers and meeting with them, particularly in the field of amateur journalism, which was popular at the time. With collaborator Roswell George Mills, Gidlow published Les Mouches fantastiques, the first magazine in North America where gay and lesbian issues were discussed, and the lifestyle celebrated. It was also adamantly anti-war, influenced by Mills and Gidlow's pacifist and anarchist viewpoints. H. P. Lovecraft, a fellow amateur journalist, attacked their work, leading Gidlow to defend it and attack back in return; the dispute created a minor controversy but brought Gidlow and Mills public, albeit negative attention.

Gidlow moved to New York in 1920 at the age of 21. There, among other jobs, she was employed by Frank Harris of Pearson's, a magazine supportive of poets and unsympathetic to the war and England. She became the poetry editor later becoming the associate editor. It was at this time she met a young Kenneth Rexroth who became known as the "father" of the San Francisco Renaissance. In 1926, Elsa moved to San Francisco. Rexroth numbered her among his closest friends. With the exception of nearly a year spent in Europe, mostly in Paris, in 1928, she continued living in the San Francisco Bay Area for the rest of her life.

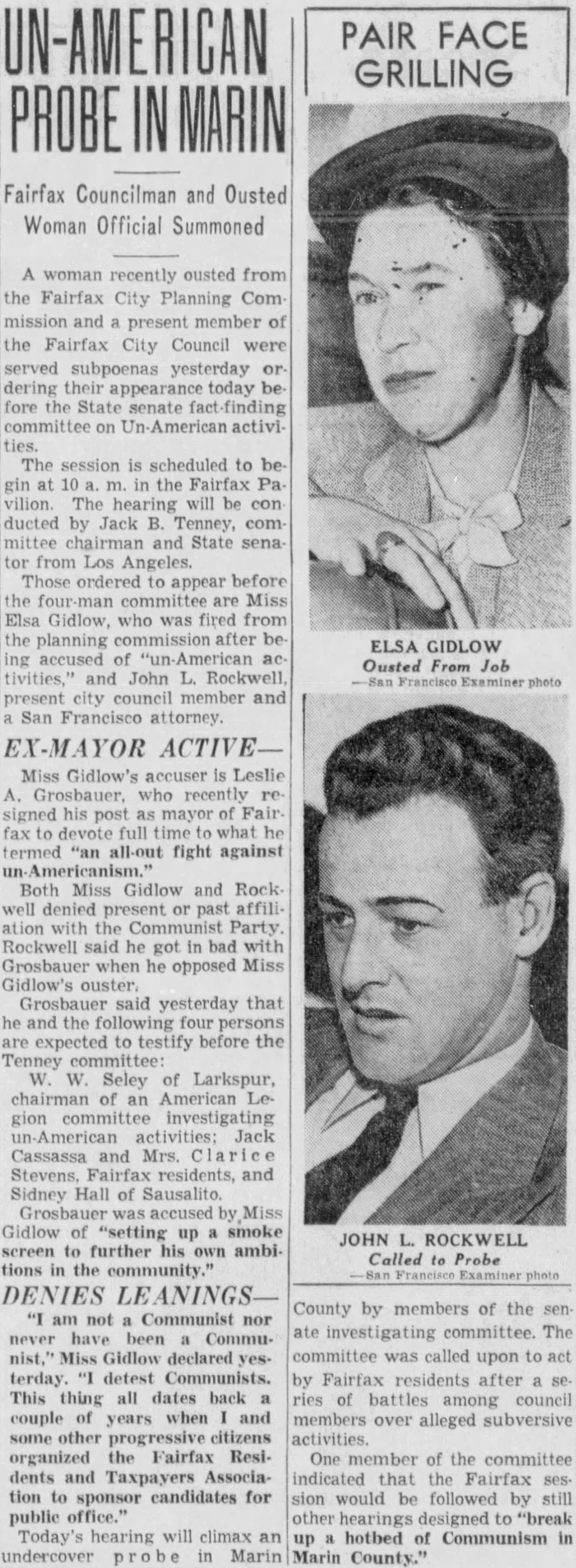
Clipping from the San Francisco Examiner, October 23, 1947

In the 1940s, she lived in Fairfax, California, where in 1944 she became a home owner, active in local politics eventually becoming one of the planning commissioners. Due to her membership in political and writers' groups allegedly affiliated with communists, she was suspected of being "Un-American" and was subsequently investigated, subpoenaed and forced to testify in front of California's Un-American Activities Committee in 1947. The committee's final report accused her of being affiliated with communist front organizations. However, as a philosophical anarchist Gidlow was ideologically opposed to communism, and she denied the accusation. Patricia Holt of the San Francisco Chronicle writes:

It amused Gidlow that such "radical" ideas set her up for a witch hunt in Fairfax, where she had moved in her 40s. [Their] charges that Gidlow was a "red," as Stanton Delaplane reported in The Chronicle, were "Washed Pink at Fairfax Hearings." But Gidlow, who lived with a woman of African descent and often made dinner for the Chans from San Francisco, was later accused of "living with a colored woman and frequently entertaining Chinese people...This was damning evidence that I could not be a loyal American."

== Druid Heights ==
Perhaps seeking solitude, Gidlow left her first home, Madrona, and the garden she had so lovingly tended for 10 years there, and in 1954, purchased a ranch which she subsequently shared with Roger Somers and his family above Muir Woods on the southwest flank of Mount Tamalpais in Marin County, California. Gidlow named her portion of the mountain ranch, which included a secondary dwelling, "Druid Heights", a nod to her friend, Irish poet Ella Young. Gidlow and her partner Isabel Grenfell Quallo (1896–1985) lived together for a short time at Druid Heights, but family commitments called Isabel away. Also living there at one time or another were notable residents including her close friend Alan Watts, the poet Gary Snyder, furniture maker Edward Stiles and freewheeling bohemian Roger Somers.

Along with Watts and his soon to be wife Mary Jane Yates, Gidlow planned and then co-founded the Society for Comparative Philosophy here in 1962. This society financed many of the improvements to the property and brought many of the important visitors and "artists in residence" for whom Druid Heights is now known. Besides Alan Watts, notable residents who, through Elsa's largess, found cheap rent and a place to create or escape were David Wills, Catharine MacKinnon, Roger Somers, Sunyata, John Blofeld, and many leaders of various women's rights efforts. The Society morphed into the Druid Heights Artist Retreat after her death whereupon she provided the funds to begin the nascent-albeit short-lived-organization, Druid Heights Artists Retreat. A Facebook group called "Save Druid Heights" has been formed where many today hope to return DHAR to her home at Druid Heights.

Gidlow in 1974

Gidlow socialized with many famous artists, radical thinkers, mystics, and political activists, including Dizzy Gillespie, Louis Armstrong, Margo St. James, Allen Ginsberg, James Broughton, Baba Ram Dass, Lama Govinda, Robert Shapiro, Maud Oakes, Robert Duncan, Clarkson Crane, Sara Bard Field, Kenneth Rexroth, Edward Stiles, Roger Somers, Catharine MacKinnon and Maya Angelou. Gidlow helped plan the funeral for her friend Alan Watts when he died there. The monks from nearby Green Gulch Monastery often came to visit and participated in a ceremony there upon Watts's death which included an Anglican Mass; they then buried half of his ashes near his library at Druid Heights, and brought the second half to Green Gulch Monastery in the nearby valley.

== Autobiography ==
Gidlow's autobiography Elsa, I Come with My Songs: The Autobiography of Elsa Gidlow, published in 1986, gives a personal and detailed account of seeking, finding and creating a life with other lesbians at a time when little was recorded on the topic; notably, it is the first lesbian autobiography written where the author does not use a pseudonym. It offers a superb account of one eyewitness-participant's view of twentieth-century artistic-bohemian life and of the cultural history of the San Francisco area. Gidlow also openly discussed her lifetime experience as a lesbian in the critically acclaimed 1977 documentary feature Word Is Out: Stories of Some of Our Lives, which was released theatrically and which was broadcast on many PBS stations around the United States starting in 1978.

== Death ==
The last few months of her life, Gidlow experienced several strokes. She chose not to seek medical care in a hospital and died at home in Druid Heights at the age of 87. Gidlow was cremated and her ashes were mixed with rice and buried beneath an apple tree in Druid Heights. Parts of Druid Heights have subsequently fallen into ruin, but Gidlow's home remained intact as recently as 2012.

== Legacy ==
Gidlow's estate donated her extensive personal papers to the GLBT Historical Society in San Francisco in 1991. The collection consists of 16 boxes (13 linear feet) of correspondence, journals, literary manuscripts, legal records, photographs and other materials documenting Gidlow's life, work and relationships. The papers are organized into nine series: Correspondence, Subject Files, Manuscripts, Published Works, Journals and Yearbooks, Audio-Visual and Photographs, Ephemera, Oversize Materials, and Original Documents. The collection is fully processed and available to researchers.

== Selected works ==
- On a Grey Thread (1923)
- California Valley with Girls (1932)
- From Alba Hill (1933)
- Wild Swan Singing (1954)
- Letters from Limbo (1956)
- Moods of Eros (1970)
- Makings for Meditation: Parapoems Reverent and Irreverent (1973)
- Wise Man's Gold (1974)
- Ask No Man Pardon: The Philosophic Significance of Being Lesbian (1975)
- Sapphic Songs: Seventeen to Seventy (1976)
- Sapphic Songs: Eighteen to Eighty, the Love Poetry of Elsa Gidlow (1982)
- Elsa, I Come with My Songs: The Autobiography of Elsa Gidlow (1986)
