= Violet Henry-Anderson =

Scottish golfer

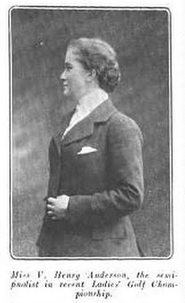
Violet Henry Anderson, from a 1907 publication

Violet Winifred Leslie Henry Anderson (15 December 1882 – 20 June 1935), known professionally as V. Henry-Anderson (with or without the hyphen), was a Scottish-born golfer and partner of poet Elsa Gidlow.

== Early life ==
Violet Winifred Leslie Henry Anderson was from Blairgowrie, Perthshire, the daughter of Isaac Henry-Anderson and Katherine Blyth. Her father was a solicitor and secretary of the Blairgowrie Golf Club before he went bankrupt in 1904 and left his family. Violet Henry-Anderson moved to Canada as a young woman with her brothers Godfrey and Edward in 1908. They settled in Montreal. She sold her knitting to pay her tuition at secretarial school.

== Career ==
V. Henry-Anderson learned to play golf in her youth in Edinburgh. At age 12 she won a prize playing in a mixed foursome with her brother at Blairgowrie, where she won the Watson gold medal twice in 1900. In 1906 she won Lady Annesley's Challenge Cup. She was the only non-Irish medalist (semi-finalist) at the Ladies Championship in Newcastle, County Down, in 1907, and was considered "quite to be reckoned in the first flight of lady golfers" by a commentator at the time.

In Canada, she helped to popularize golf as a women's game, first as a member of the Royal Montreal Ladies Golf Club. In 1909 she won the Canadian Women's Amateur Championship. In western Canada she won the Vancouver Ladies Golf Championship three times in four years, between 1917 and 1920, and the Ladies City Golf Championship in 1922.

== Personal life ==
Violet Henry Anderson was called "Tommy" by friends. She was in a relationship with actress Mona Shelley; they lived together in Vancouver and New York City before they separated. Henry-Anderson and poet Elsa Gidlow were partners for about thirteen years, from 1922. "We were profoundly sure of our right to be as we were, to love and live in our chosen way, we were happy in it", recalled Gidlow of her time with Henry-Anderson, many years later. They moved to San Francisco together in 1926. Violet Henry-Anderson, a heavy smoker, died there in 1935, from lung cancer, aged 53 years. Gidlow described Henry-Anderson's death as "like an amputation of a part of myself".
