= 1928 Nevada Wolf Pack football team =

American college football season

1928 Nevada Wolf Pack football
- Conference: Far Western Conference
- Record: 0–7–1 (0–4–1 FWC)
- Head coach: Buck Shaw (4th season)
- Home stadium: Mackay Field

1928 Far Western Conference football standings
| | Conf. | | | | | Overall |
| Team | W | | L | | T | W | | L | | T |
|---|---|---|---|---|---|---|---|---|---|---|
| Saint Mary's $ | 2 | – | 0 | – | 0 | 5 | – | 4 | – | 0 |
| Cal Aggies | 3 | – | 1 | – | 0 | 6 | – | 3 | – | 0 |
| St. Ignatius (CA) | 3 | – | 1 | – | 0 | 4 | – | 4 | – | 0 |
| Pacific (CA) | 2 | – | 1 | – | 0 | 5 | – | 2 | – | 0 |
| Fresno State | 0 | – | 3 | – | 1 | 2 | – | 5 | – | 1 |
| Nevada | 0 | – | 4 | – | 1 | 0 | – | 7 | – | 1 |
$ – Conference champion

The 1928 Nevada Wolf Pack football team was an American football team that represented the University of Nevada in the Far Western Conference (FWC) during the 1928 college football season. In their fourth and final season under head coach Buck Shaw, the team compiled a 0–7–1 record (0–4–1 FWC) and finished last in the conference.

== Schedule ==
| Date | Opponent | Site | Result | Source |
|---|---|---|---|---|
| September 29 | at St. Ignatius (CA) | San Francisco, CA | L 0–12 | |
| October 6 | Utah* | Mackay Field; Reno, NV | L 7–32 | |
| October 13 | at Santa Clara* | Mission Field; Santa Clara, CA | L 6–19 | |
| October 20 | Pacific (CA) | Mackay Field; Reno, NV | L 6–7 | |
| October 27 | Saint Mary's | Mackay Field; Reno, NV | L 0–22 | |
| November 3 | at Cal Aggies | Sacramento, CA | L 0–6 | |
| November 10 | at Fresno State | Fresno State College Stadium; Fresno, CA | T 12–12 | |
| November 17 | at California* | California Memorial Stadium; Berkeley, CA | L 0–60 | |
*Non-conference game
