= 1928 Fresno State Bulldogs football team =

American college football season

1928 Fresno State Bulldogs football
- Conference: Far Western Conference
- Record: 2–5–1 (0–3–1 FWC)
- Head coach: Arthur W. Jones (8th season)
- Home stadium: Fresno State College Stadium

1928 Far Western Conference football standings
	Conf.					Overall
Team	W		L		T	W		L		T
Saint Mary's $	2	–	0	–	0	5	–	4	–	0
Cal Aggies	3	–	1	–	0	6	–	3	–	0
St. Ignatius (CA)	3	–	1	–	0	4	–	4	–	0
Pacific (CA)	2	–	1	–	0	5	–	2	–	0
Fresno State	0	–	3	–	1	2	–	5	–	1
Nevada	0	–	4	–	1	0	–	7	–	1
$ – Conference champion

The 1928 Fresno State Bulldogs football team represented Fresno State Normal School—now known as California State University, Fresno—during the 1928 college football season.

Fresno State competed in the Far Western Conference (FWC). (Note: The Northern California Athletic Conference (NCAC) was known as the Far Western Conference (FWC) from its founding in 1925 to 1982.) The 1928 team was led by head coach Arthur W. Jones in his eighth and last year at the helm. They played home games at Fresno State College Stadium (Note: Ratcliffe Stadium was known as Fresno State College Stadium from 1926 to 1940.) on the campus of Fresno City College in Fresno, California. They finished with a record of two wins, five losses and one tie (2–5–1, 0–3–1 FWC). The Bulldogs were outscored by their opponents 56–288 for the season and were shut out in five of the eight games.

== Schedule ==
Date	Opponent	Site	Result	Source
September 29	Cal Poly*	Fresno State College Stadium; Fresno, CA	W 37–0	
October 6	Santa Barbara State*	Fresno State College Stadium; Fresno, CA	W 7–0	
October 13	at St. Ignatius (CA)	Kezar Stadium; San Francisco, CA	L 0–19	
October 27	at Stanford*	Stanford Stadium; Stanford, CA	L 0–47	
November 3	at Pacific (CA)	C.O.P. Field; Stockton, CA	L 0–13	
November 10	Nevada	Fresno State College Stadium; Fresno, CA	T 12–12	
November 23	at Santa Clara*	Mission Field; Santa Clara, CA	L 0–83	
November 29	Cal Aggies	Fresno State College Stadium; Fresno, CA	L 0–13	
*Non-conference game
