= Les Mouches Fantastiques =

LGBT+ magazine

- Co-editor: Elsa Gidlow
- Co-editor: Roswell George Mills
- Staff writers: Elsa Gidlow; Roswell George Mills
- Categories: Literary magazine
- Publisher: Elsa Gidlow; Roswell George Mills
- Founder: Elsa Gidlow; Roswell George Mills
- First issue: 1918; 108 years ago
- Final issue Number: 1920; 5
- Country: Canada
- Based in: Montreal
- Language: French; English

Les Mouches Fantastiques (lit. The Fantastic Flies) was a Canadian underground magazine published between 1918 and 1920. Based in Montreal, Quebec, it is the first known LGBT-themed publication in Canadian and North American history.

The magazine arose out of a local writing circle established by poet Elsa Gidlow, with Gidlow and journalist Roswell George Mills as its primary contributors. The publication's working title, prior to the publication of its first issue, was Coal from Hades. Its content included both poetry and non-fiction writing about gay and lesbian identity and politics, as well as editorials opposing the war.

The magazine was widely distributed far beyond Montreal, within both gay and lesbian social networks and the underground community of amateur journalists. The magazine received correspondence from as far away as Havana, Cuba; an Episcopal priest from South Dakota left the priesthood and moved to Montreal to become Mills' partner after being exposed to the magazine; and the magazine was heavily criticized in a 1918 essay by American writer H. P. Lovecraft. The essay appears in Miscellaneous Writings, a posthumous collection of Lovecraft's shorter writings, which was published in 1995.

Five issues of the magazine were published; it was discontinued in 1920 when Mills and Gidlow moved from Montreal to New York City. Few copies of the publication are known to still exist today. One is in the archives of the University of South Florida, the University of Iowa library has an original of all five issues, and the Quebec Gay Archives has a reprint of the final issue. The New York Public Library catalog notes two issues (Vol. I, no. 5, May 1918; and Vol. II, no. 1, March 1920).
