= 1928 Saint Mary's Gaels football team =

American college football season

1928 Saint Mary's Gaels football

FWC champion
- Conference: Far Western Conference
- Record: 5–4 (2–0 FWC)
- Head coach: Slip Madigan (8th season)
- Home stadium: Kezar Stadium

1928 Far Western Conference football standings
	Conf.					Overall
Team	W		L		T	W		L		T
Saint Mary's $	2	–	0	–	0	5	–	4	–	0
Cal Aggies	3	–	1	–	0	6	–	3	–	0
St. Ignatius (CA)	3	–	1	–	0	4	–	4	–	0
Pacific (CA)	2	–	1	–	0	5	–	2	–	0
Fresno State	0	–	3	–	1	2	–	5	–	1
Nevada	0	–	4	–	1	0	–	7	–	1
$ – Conference champion

The 1928 Saint Mary's Gaels football team was an American football team that represented Saint Mary's College of California during the 1928 college football season. In their eighth season under head coach Slip Madigan, the Gaels compiled a 5–4 record, won the Northern California Athletic Conference championship, and outscored opponents by a combined total of 105 to 59. End Malcolm Franklan was selected by both the Associated Press and the United Press as a first-team member of the 1928 All-Pacific Coast football team.

== Schedule ==
Date	Opponent	Site	Result	Attendance	Source
September 30	vs. West Coast Army*	Kezar Stadium; San Francisco, CA	W 12–0		
October 6	at California*	California Memorial Stadium; Berkeley, CA	L 0–7	60,000	
October 13	at USC*	Los Angeles Memorial Coliseum; Los Angeles, CA	L 6–19	45,000	
October 21	Young Men's Institute*	Moraga, CA	W 25–0	5,000	
October 27	at Nevada	Mackay Field; Reno, NV	W 38–0		
November 4	vs. St. Ignatius (CA)	Kezar Stadium; San Francisco, CA	W 13–0		
November 12	at Gonzaga*	Gonzaga Stadium; Spokane, WA	L 7–20		
November 18	Olympic Club*	Kezar Stadium; San Francisco, CA	L 0–6	20,000	
December 1	Santa Clara*	Kezar Stadium; San Francisco, CA	W 20–7	20,000	
*Non-conference game
