= 1928 Hawaii Rainbows football team =

American college football season

1928 Hawaii Rainbows football
- Conference: Independent
- Record: 2–5
- Head coach: Otto Klum (8th season)
- Home stadium: Honolulu Stadium

1928 Western college football independents records
	Conf.			Overall
Team	W	L	T	W		L		T
Arizona		–		5	–	1	–	2
Idaho Southern Branch		–		5	–	1	–	2
Gonzaga		–		6	–	2	–	1
New Mexico		–		5	–	2	–	1
Humboldt State		–		2	–	1	–	0
Loyola (CA)		–		5	–	3	–	0
Tempe State		–		3	–	2	–	1
Regis		–		5	–	4	–	0
Santa Clara		–		5	–	4	–	0
New Mexico A&M		–		4	–	5	–	0
Hawaii		–		2	–	5	–	0

The 1928 Hawaii Rainbows football team represented the University of Hawaiʻi (now known as the University of Hawaiʻi at Mānoa) as an independent during the 1928 college football season. Led by eighth-year head coach Otto Klum, the Rainbows compiled an overall record of 2–5.

== Schedule ==
Date	Opponent	Site	Result	Attendance	Source
October 6	Hawaii alumni	Honolulu Stadium; Honolulu, Territory of Hawaii	L 6–13		
November 6	Mailes	Honolulu Stadium; Honolulu, Territory of Hawaii	L 13–38		
November 12	Palama	Honolulu Stadium; Honolulu, Territory of Hawaii	W 38–0		
November 24	Honolulu Town Team	Honolulu Stadium; Honolulu, Territory of Hawaii	L 20–39		
December 8	Occidental	Honolulu Stadium; Honolulu, Territory of Hawaii	W 32–0	3,000	
December 15	Denver	Honolulu Stadium; Honolulu, Territory of Hawaii	L 12–13		
January 1, 1929	Oregon	Honolulu Stadium; Honolulu, Territory of Hawaii	L 0–6	10,000	
