= 1928 Santa Clara Broncos football team =

American college football season

1928 Santa Clara Broncos football
- Conference: Independent
- Record: 5–4
- Head coach: Adam Walsh (4th season)
- Home stadium: Mission Field

1928 Western college football independents records
	Conf.			Overall
Team	W	L	T	W		L		T
Arizona		–		5	–	1	–	2
Idaho Southern Branch		–		5	–	1	–	2
Gonzaga		–		6	–	2	–	1
New Mexico		–		5	–	2	–	1
Humboldt State		–		2	–	1	–	0
Loyola (CA)		–		5	–	3	–	0
Tempe State		–		3	–	2	–	1
Regis		–		5	–	4	–	0
Santa Clara		–		5	–	4	–	0
New Mexico A&M		–		4	–	5	–	0
Hawaii		–		2	–	5	–	0

The 1928 Santa Clara Broncos football team was an American football team that represented Santa Clara University as an independent during the 1928 college football season. In their fourth and final season under head coach Adam Walsh, the Broncos compiled a 5–4 record and outscored opponents by 179 to 106.

== Schedule ==
Date	Opponent	Site	Result	Attendance	Source
September 29	at California	California Memorial Stadium; Berkeley, CA	L 0–22	40,000	
October 8	at St. Ignatius (CA)	Kezar Stadium; San Francisco, CA	W 33–0		
October 13	Nevada	Mission Field; Santa Clara, CA	W 19–6		
October 20	West Coast Army	Santa Clara, CA	W 7–6		
November 3	at Olympic Club	Kezar Stadium; San Francisco, CA	L 18–20	500	
November 10	at Stanford	Stanford Stadium; Stanford, CA	L 0–31	15,000	
November 16	Pacific (CA)	Mission Field; Santa Clara, CA	W 12–7		
November 23	Fresno State	Mission Field; Santa Clara, CA	W 84–0		
November 29	at Saint Mary's	Kezar Stadium; San Francisco, CA	L 7–20	20,000	
