= 1928 Loyola Lions football team =

American college football season

1928 Loyola Lions football
- Conference: Independent
- Record: 5–3
- Head coach: Mike Pecarovich (1st season)
- Home stadium: Loyola Field

1928 Western college football independents records
	Conf.			Overall
Team	W	L	T	W		L		T
Arizona		–		5	–	1	–	2
Idaho Southern Branch		–		5	–	1	–	2
Gonzaga		–		6	–	2	–	1
New Mexico		–		5	–	2	–	1
Humboldt State		–		2	–	1	–	0
Loyola (CA)		–		5	–	3	–	0
Tempe State		–		3	–	2	–	1
Regis		–		5	–	4	–	0
Santa Clara		–		5	–	4	–	0
New Mexico A&M		–		4	–	5	–	0
Hawaii		–		2	–	5	–	0

The 1928 Loyola Lions football team was an American football team that represented Loyola College of Los Angeles (now known as Loyola Marymount University) as an independent during the 1928 college football season. The Lions compiled a 5–3 record and outscored their opponents by a total of 147 to 50.

In February 1928, Mike Pecarovich was hired to coach the team. He had previously played football at Gonzaga under Gus Dorais and later served as an assistant coach under Dorais. Before the season began, Pecarovich trained the team in the "Notre Dame shift" along with several of his own variations.

== Schedule ==
Date	Opponent	Site	Result	Attendance	Source
September 29	San Pedro Naval Base	Loyola Field; Los Angeles, CA	W 25–0		
September 29	Fullerton	Loyola Field; Los Angeles, CA	W 26–0		
October 6	Northern Arizona	Loyola Field; Los Angeles, CA	W 18–0		
October 20	St. Ignatius (CA)	Loyola Field; Los Angeles, CA	L 13–18		
October 27	Taft	Loyola Field; Los Angeles, CA	W 46–6		
November 10	at Regis	Denver, CO	W 13–7	7,000	
November 17	Cal Aggies	Loyola Field; Los Angeles, CA	L 0–6		
November 24	Gonzaga	Loyola Field; Los Angeles, CA	L 6–13		
