= 1928 Regis Rangers football team =

American college football season

1928 Regis Rangers football
- Conference: Independent
- Record: 5–4
- Head coach: Red Strader (1st season)

1928 Western college football independents records
	Conf.			Overall
Team	W	L	T	W		L		T
Arizona		–		5	–	1	–	2
Idaho Southern Branch		–		5	–	1	–	2
Gonzaga		–		6	–	2	–	1
New Mexico		–		5	–	2	–	1
Humboldt State		–		2	–	1	–	0
Loyola (CA)		–		5	–	3	–	0
Tempe State		–		3	–	2	–	1
Regis		–		5	–	4	–	0
Santa Clara		–		5	–	4	–	0
New Mexico A&M		–		4	–	5	–	0
Hawaii		–		2	–	5	–	0

The 1928 Regis Rangers football team was an American football team that represented Regis College as an independent during the 1928 college football season. The team compiled a 5–4 record and outscored opponents by a total of 212 to 80.

In May 1928, Red Strader was hired as the team's head coach. He had been an assistant coach at St. Mary's. Strader was assisted by John Illia. Stubbs, who played at the guard position, was the team captain.

Prior to the 1928 season, Regis was admitted as "an associate member" of the Rocky Mountain Conference with the understanding that conference teams were under no obligation to schedule games and that the conference would not be required to admit Regis as a full member.

== Schedule ==
Date	Opponent	Site	Result	Attendance	Source
September 22	Grand Island	Denver, CO	W 57–0		
September 29	at Oklahoma A&M	Lewis Field; Stillwater, OK	L 6–13		
October 6	at Fort Russell	Cheyenne, WY	W 63–0		
October 12	Bethany (KS)	Denver, CO	W 12–6		
October 27	Haskell	Denver, CO	L 9–14		
November 3	at First Infantry (Fort Russell)	Cheyenne, WY	W 19–6		
November 10	Loyola (CA)	Denver, CO	L 7–13	7,000	
November 24	Western State (CO)	Denver, CO	W 38–14		
November 29	at Chadron State	Chadron Field; Chadron, NE	L 6–14		
