= 1928 Gonzaga Bulldogs football team =

American college football season

1928 Gonzaga Bulldogs football
- Conference: Independent
- Record: 6–2–1
- Head coach: Clipper Smith (4th season)
- Home stadium: Gonzaga Stadium

1928 Western college football independents records
	Conf.			Overall
Team	W	L	T	W		L		T
Arizona		–		5	–	1	–	2
Idaho Southern Branch		–		5	–	1	–	2
Gonzaga		–		6	–	2	–	1
New Mexico		–		5	–	2	–	1
Humboldt State		–		2	–	1	–	0
Loyola (CA)		–		5	–	3	–	0
Tempe State		–		3	–	2	–	1
Regis		–		5	–	4	–	0
Santa Clara		–		5	–	4	–	0
New Mexico A&M		–		4	–	5	–	0
Hawaii		–		2	–	5	–	0

The 1928 Gonzaga Bulldogs football team was an American football team that represented Gonzaga University during the 1928 college football season. In their fourth year under head coach Clipper Smith, the Bulldogs compiled a 6–2–1 record and outscored all opponents by a total of 121 to 41.

In May 1929, Coach Smith left Gonzaga to become head coach at Santa Clara. In four years as head coach at Gonzaga, Smith compiled a 23–9–5 record.

== Schedule ==
Date	Opponent	Site	Result	Attendance	Source
September 22	Ellensburg Normal	Gonzaga Stadium; Spokane, WA	W 31–0		
September 29	Washington State	Gonzaga Stadium; Spokane, WA	L 0–3		
October 6	Idaho	Gonzaga Stadium; Spokane, WA (rivalry)	T 6–6		
October 20	at Mount St. Charles	Helena, MT	W 18–12	1,700–2,000	
October 27	Whitman	Gonzaga Stadium; Spokane, WA	W 6–0		
November 12	Saint Mary's^{†}	Gonzaga Stadium; Spokane, WA	W 20–7		
November 17	at St. Ignatius (CA)	Kezar Stadium; San Francisco, CA	W 27–0	5,000	
November 24	at Loyola (CA)	Loyola Field; Los Angeles, CA	W 13–6		
November 29	Montana	Gonzaga Stadium; Spokane, WA	L 0–7		
^{†}Homecoming
