= Bolobo =

- Commune
- Location in the Democratic Republic of the Congo
- Coordinates: 2°10′S 16°14′E
- Country: DR Congo
- Province: Mai-Ndombe
- Territory: Bolobo

Population (2009)
  - Total: 31,366
- Time zone: UTC+1 (West Africa Time)
- Climate: Aw
- National language: Lingala

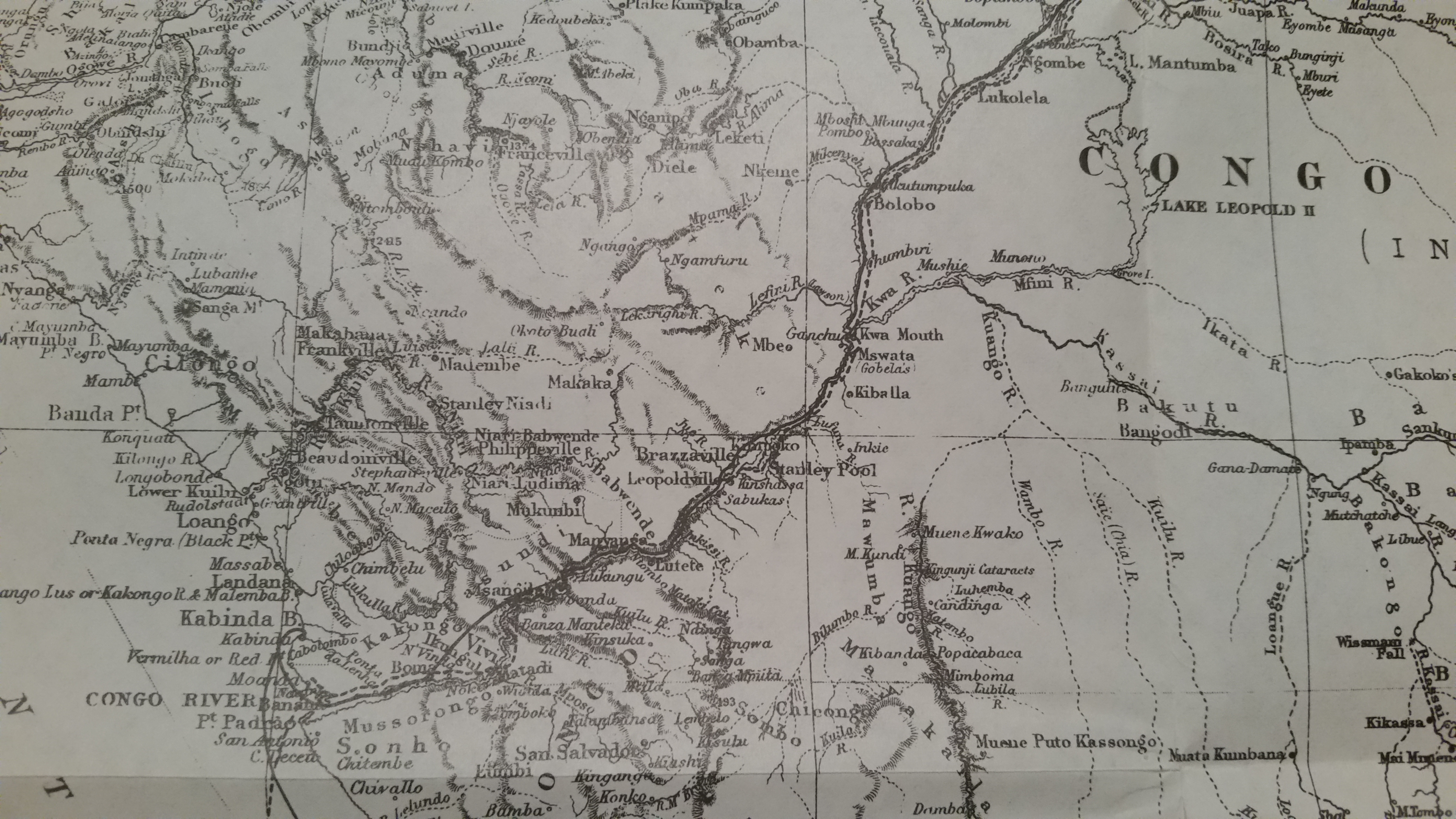
Stanley's route is depicted by the solid black line.

Bolobo is a town on the Congo River in Mai-Ndombe Province in the western part of the Democratic Republic of the Congo (DRC). It is the administrative center of Bolobo Territory. As of 2009 it had an estimated population of 31,366.

== People ==
The predominant ethnic group is that of the Banunu people, who originate from upriver and whose Bobangi language was the former trade language for the area. Lingala, one of the four national languages of the DRC, is now used as the lingua franca. Other local ethnicities include the Bateke (the natives of this area) and Batende, who have their own Bantu languages.

== Early European visitors ==
Bolobo was visited by Henry Morton Stanley on his trip down the Congo River in the 19th century. Pioneering missionary work was carried out by members of the Baptist Missionary Society, including George Grenfell operating from the steamer "Peace". Another pioneering missionary was A.N. Whitehead (known as "Moteyi Nkasa" in Bobangi), who was responsible for the production of a grammar and dictionary in that language.

== Mission activities ==
The Baptist Missionary Society established a hospital, primary and secondary schools, a printing press, and a Bible Institute for training pastors. It was served by expatriate personnel from Britain and some Peace Corps workers from the USA until economic and political conditions deteriorated in the 1990s. The Baptist churches are part of the Communauté Baptiste du Fleuve Congo [CBFC], a constituent member of the Church of Christ in the Congo (Eglise du Christ au Congo, ECC). There is also a Catholic church that was established by European missionary priests and sisters, including from Belgium, the former colonial power. Bobangi is used in worship in the two Protestant churches, Ngamakala and Ncasa; there are also smaller prayer chapels in the various wards of the town that are used for early morning prayers and for special services in the week during Holy Week.
