= 1928 New Mexico A&M Aggies football team =

American college football season

1928 New Mexico A&M Aggies football
- Conference: Independent
- Record: 4–5
- Head coach: Ted Coffman (2nd season)
- Home stadium: Miller Field

1928 Western college football independents records
	Conf.			Overall
Team	W	L	T	W		L		T
Arizona		–		5	–	1	–	2
Idaho Southern Branch		–		5	–	1	–	2
Gonzaga		–		6	–	2	–	1
New Mexico		–		5	–	2	–	1
Humboldt State		–		2	–	1	–	0
Loyola (CA)		–		5	–	3	–	0
Tempe State		–		3	–	2	–	1
Regis		–		5	–	4	–	0
Santa Clara		–		5	–	4	–	0
New Mexico A&M		–		4	–	5	–	0
Hawaii		–		2	–	5	–	0

The 1928 New Mexico A&M Aggies football team was an American football team that represented New Mexico College of Agriculture and Mechanical Arts (now known as New Mexico State University) during the 1928 college football season. In their second year under head coach Ted Coffman, the Aggies compiled a 4–5 record and shut out three opponents. The team played home games on Miller Field, sometimes also referred to as College Field.

== Schedule ==
Date	Opponent	Site	Result	Source
September 26	Army Artillery	Miller Field; Las Cruces, NM	W 55–0	
October 5	New Mexico Teachers	Miller Field; Las Cruces, NM	W 92–0	
October 13	at Sul Ross	Jackson Field; Alpine, TX	L 0–33	
October 20	Montezuma College	Miller Field; Las Cruces, NM	W 25–0	
October 27	at New Mexico	University Field; Albuquerque, NM (rivalry)	L 13–14	
November 2	New Mexico Mines^{†}	Miller Field; Las Cruces, NM	W 39–7	
November 9	at Texas Mines	El Paso High School Stadium; El Paso, TX (rivalry)	L 0–6	
November 17	at Arizona	University Field; Tucson, AZ	L 0–40	
November 29	at New Mexico Military	Roswell, NM	L 0–43	
^{†}Homecoming
