= Dorothy Erskine =

American public spaces activist

Dorothy Erskine was a key figure in the early development of Greenbelt Alliance and in Bay Area civic planning. Before her focus on open-space advocacy, Erskine worked on housing reform in San Francisco, including with the San Francisco Housing Association, where her concerns focused on overcrowding, poor housing conditions, and the effects of urban planning on residents. In a 1999 interview, Erskine explained that her interest in open space began with slums, and she continued to connect her environmental work to earlier efforts around housing and public health.

She founded Citizens for Regional Recreation and Parks in 1958, which later became People for Open Space and then Greenbelt Alliance. The organization's early work supported regional conservation, parks, and protection of San Francisco/Bay Area open space. Erskine's role links the organization's environmental mission to a broader history of housing reform, urban planning, and citizen-led opposition to destructive development in the Bay Area.

Dorothy Erskine Park, located in the Glen Park neighborhood of San Francisco, is named in her honor.
