= Charles Logan (author) =

British science fiction writer and nurse

- Born: 1930 (age 95–96)
- Occupation: Writer
- Writing career
- Language: English
- Genre: Science fiction

Charles Logan (born 1930) is a British science fiction writer and professional nurse.

He is best known as the author of the book Shipwreck, first published by Gollancz in 1975, which was the joint-winner of the prize for the best British science fiction novel that year alongside Chris Boyce. The novel tells the story of Tansis, sole survivor after his spaceship shipwreck, who landed on a planet around Capella, the main star of the Virgo constellation. Tansis fights alone against the hostile environment, struggling to survive.

Logan wrote Shipwreck along with a couple of short stories that have never been published. In 2022, Logan began publishing This Is The Moment of Our Creation a book about cosmology and meta physics, as a blog post.

== Biography ==
Logan worked as a nurse for the mentally handicapped while writing science fiction.
