= 1928 Arizona Wildcats football team =

American college football season

1928 Arizona Wildcats football
- Conference: Independent
- Record: 5–1–2
- Head coach: Pop McKale (14th season)
- Captain: Theodore R. P. Diebold

1928 Western college football independents records
	Conf.			Overall
Team	W	L	T	W		L		T
Arizona		–		5	–	1	–	2
Idaho Southern Branch		–		5	–	1	–	2
Gonzaga		–		6	–	2	–	1
New Mexico		–		5	–	2	–	1
Humboldt State		–		2	–	1	–	0
Loyola (CA)		–		5	–	3	–	0
Tempe State		–		3	–	2	–	1
Regis		–		5	–	4	–	0
Santa Clara		–		5	–	4	–	0
New Mexico A&M		–		4	–	5	–	0
Hawaii		–		2	–	5	–	0

The 1928 Arizona Wildcats football team represented the University of Arizona as an independent during the 1928 college football season. In their 14th season under head coach Pop McKale, the Wildcats compiled a 5–1–2 record and outscored their opponents, 152 to 110. The team captain was Theodore R. P. "Ted" Diebold. The team's sole loss was to USC by a 78–7 score. The 78 points allowed against USC remains an Arizona program record, as does the 12 touchdowns allowed and the 38 points allowed in the fourth quarter against USC.

== Schedule ==
Date	Opponent	Site	Result	Attendance	Source
September 29	at UCLA	Moore Field; Los Angeles, CA	T 7–7		
October 13	Pomona	University Field; Tucson, AZ	W 13–6		
October 20	Tempe State	University Field; Tucson, AZ	W 39–0		
October 27	at Texas Mines	El Paso High School Stadium; El Paso, TX	W 12–6		
November 3	New Mexico	University Field; Tucson, AZ (rivalry)	T 6–6		
November 10	at USC	Los Angeles Memorial Coliseum; Los Angeles, CA	L 7–78	20,000	
November 17	New Mexico A&M	University Field; Tucson, AZ	W 40–0		
November 29	Whittier	University Field; Tucson, AZ	W 28–7		
