= Echo Heron =

- Born: Echo Ruah Salato; Troy, New York
- Education: College of Marin
- Occupations: Author, Critical Care Nurse
- Spouse(s): J. Patrick Heron (1967-1977), Steven J. Vermillion (2012-Present)
- Children: Simon Heron
- Writing career
- Language: English
- Website: echoheron.com

Echo Heron, born Echo Ruah Salato in Troy, New York is an author of fiction, non-fiction, mysteries and historical fiction. She is also a critical care registered nurse and an activist for patients' and nurses' rights.

Her first book, Intensive Care: The Story of a Nurse, was published by Atheneum in 1987 and quickly found a place on the New York Times' bestseller list.

== Bibliography ==
Non-fiction

- Intensive Care: The Story of a Nurse (1987)
- Intensive Care: The Story of a Nurse (revised 2024)
- Condition Critical: The Story of a Nurse Continues (1994)
- Tending Lives: Nurses On the Medical Front (1998)
- Emergency 24/7: Nurses of the Emergency Room (2015)
- Mooshie: Life With an Unconventional Cat (memoir) (2021)

Fiction

- Mercy (1992)

Historical fiction

- Noon at Tiffany's: An Historical, Biographical Novel (2012)

Mysteries

- Pulse (1998)
- Panic (1998)
- Paradox (1998)
- Fatal Diagnosis (2000)
