= Theresa Brown (author) =

American clinical nurse and author

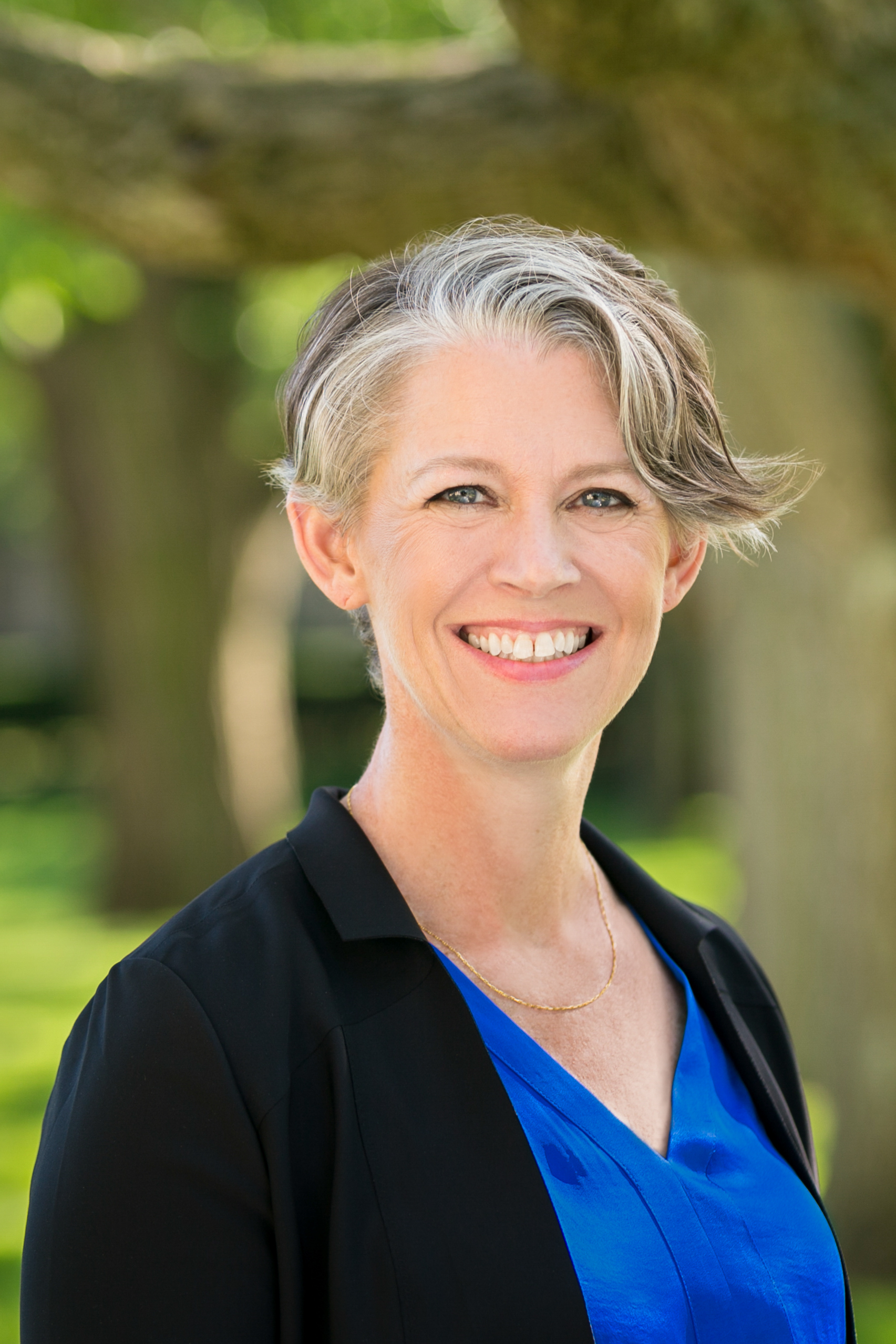
- Education: University of Chicago (BA, PhD); Columbia University (MA); University of Pittsburgh (BSN)
- Writing career
- Language: English
- Years active: 2009 - Present
- Subjects: Nursing, Health Care
- Notable work: Critical Care
- Website: www.theresabrownrn.com

Theresa Brown, PhD, BSN, RN, is an American clinical nurse, frequent contributor to The New York Times and author. New York Times columnist for Bedside from 2012 to 2015, she was previously a contributor to the Times blog "Well". Her first book, Critical Care, was published in 2010 by Harper Studio, an imprint of HarperCollins, (published in paperback, April 2011, by HarperOne). Her second book, The Shift: One Nurse, Twelve Hours, Four Patients' Lives, was published in 2015, published by Algonquin Books and was a New York Times Bestseller.

== Early years and education ==
Brown grew up in Springfield, Missouri. Her father was a professor of philosophy at Missouri State University and her mother was a social worker. She received a B.A. and a PhD in English from the University of Chicago and an M.A. from Columbia University. Brown taught writing and literature at Harvard, MIT, and Tufts.

== Nursing career ==
After a few years in academia, Brown decided to make a career change. She completed an accelerated one-year program at the University of Pittsburgh and became a licensed Registered Nurse. Brown's nursing practice has focused on oncology, palliative care and hospice.

== Writing career ==
In her first year as an oncology nurse, Brown experienced the sudden death of a patient and to process the experience, wrote an essay titled "Perhaps Death is Proud" (based on the poem Death Be Not Proud by John Donne). She submitted the piece to The New York Times, which published it on September 8, 2008. Shortly after the publication of her essay, Brown began receiving interest from publishers and agents across the country. The essay was included in Best American Science Writing 2009 and Best American Medical Writing 2009. Brown became a regular paid contributor to The New York Times, and her August 19, 2009 post on the Times blog "Well", “A Nurse’s View of Health Reform,” caught the White House's attention. President Obama quoted from Brown's blog post in a speech advocating for the Affordable Care Act.

Brown's first book, Critical Care, was acquired by Bob Miller and published by HarperStudio in June 2010. Critical Care takes readers through Brown's first year as a nurse, her "first code, first death and first Condition A (a sudden death due to cardiac arrest). We learn, as she did, that what's behind the scenes of health care is a chaotic, bureaucratic maze. We see that nursing is as much about time-management and tenacity as it is about medicine." Schools of Nursing use Critical Care as a textbook.

Brown's second book, The Shift: One Nurse, Twelve Hours, Four Patients' Lives was published by Algonquin Press and was released on September 22, 2015. The book spans one 12-hour shift on a busy teaching hospital's cancer ward and the story of 4 patients. Barnes & Noble Reviews described The Shift as a "riveting account of a day in the life of a highly competent and compassionate but overtaxed bedside nurse."

== Writing about bullying ==
Theresa's editorial "Physician, Heel Thyself" appeared in The New York Times on May 8, 2011. Covering the subject of physician-nurse bullying Brown wrote: "...because doctors are at the top of the food chain, the bad behavior of even a few of them can set a corrosive tone for the whole organization. Nurses in turn bully other nurses, attending physicians bully doctors-in-training, and experienced nurses sometimes bully the newest doctors". The piece ignited discussion on the subject of Bullying in medicine in blogs, healthcare publications and mainstream media outlets. Physicians Kevin Pho Kevin Pho and Ford Vox, (writing in The Atlantic), published responses to the piece questioning whether doctors should be held solely accountable for bullying in the hospital. The piece was also discussed in the American Journal of Nursing by editor Maureen Shawn Kennedy.
