= Teresa Medeiros =

American novelist

- Born: 1962 or 1963 (age 63–64)
- Occupation: Novelist
- Writing career
- Genres: Romance, Fantasy
- Website: www.teresamedeiros.com

Teresa Medeiros (born 1962/1963) is an American award-winning romance novelist. She wrote her first novel at 21. Before becoming an author, she was a nurse. According to her official biography, she lives in Kentucky.

Her books have appeared on The New York Times Best Seller list. She is a two-time Fantasy, Futuristic, and Paranormal Romance Writers PRISM Award winner, and two-time recipient of the Waldenbooks Award for bestselling fiction. Additionally she is a charter member of the Romance Writers of America Honor Roll. She is also a member of Kentucky Romance Writers and Novelists, Inc.

== Bibliography ==
=== The Brides of Legend Series ===
1. Lady of Conquest (August 1989)
2. Shadows and Lace (September 1990)

=== The Lennox Family Magic Series ===
1. Breath of Magic (March 1996)
2. Touch of Enchantment (July 1997)

=== The Fairy Tale Series ===
1. Charming the Prince (April 1999)
2. The Bride and the Beast (April 2001)

=== The Fairleigh Sisters Series ===
1. A Kiss to Remember (May 2002)
2. One Night of Scandal (August 2003)

=== The Kane/Cabot Vampire Series ===
1. After Midnight (September 2005)
2. The Vampire Who Loved Me (October 2006)

=== The Kincaid Highland Series ===
1. Some Like It Wicked (August 2008)
2. Some Like It Wild (April 2009)

=== The Burke Brothers Series ===
1. The Pleasure of Your Kiss (January 2012)
2. The Temptation of Your Touch (January 2013)

=== Contemporary ===
- Goodnight Tweetheart (December 2010)

=== Single novels ===
- Heather and Velvet (June 1992)
- Once an Angel (April 1993)
- A Whisper of Roses (October 1993)
- Thief of Hearts (September 1994)
- Fairest of Them All (May 1995)
- Nobody's Darling (April 1998)
- Yours Until Dawn (August 2004)
- The Devil Wears Plaid (September 2010)
