= College of Marin =

Community college in Marin County, California, US

Coordinates: 37.955568°N 122.548885°W

- Former name: Marin Junior College (1926–1947)
- Type: Public community college
- Established: 1926
- Parent institution: Marin Community College District
- Accreditation: ACCJC
- Superintendent/ President: Jonathan Eldridge
- Students: 4,283 (all undergraduate) (Fall 2023)
- Location: Kentfield and Novato, California, United States
- Campus: Suburban Kentfield, 27 acres (11 ha) Indian Valley, 360 acres (150 ha)
- Colors: Black & gold
- Nickname: The Mariners
- Sporting affiliations: Bay Valley Conference
- Website: www.marin.edu
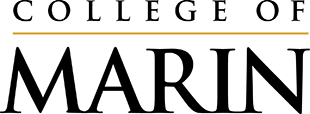

The College of Marin, (known as Marin Junior College, 1926–1947) is a public community college in Marin County, California, with two campuses, one in Kentfield, and the second in Novato. It is the only institution operated by the Marin Community College District.

The College of Marin has been in operation since 1926. Each semester, about 10,000 students are enrolled in over 1,100 credit classes. Approximately 100 international students participate in the College of Marin's International Student Program. Nearly 6,000 students attend the college's community education and community services classes. The College of Marin is known for its theatre department, which has the highest transfer acceptance to Juilliard of any two-year college in the nation.

== History ==
The college offers seventy Associate of Arts and Associate of Science degree programs, and has established approximately 200 transfer agreements with the University of California, California State University, and private colleges. In addition, the college provides 35 two-year vocational and career programs, as well as providing basic skills, English as a second language education, and community education classes.

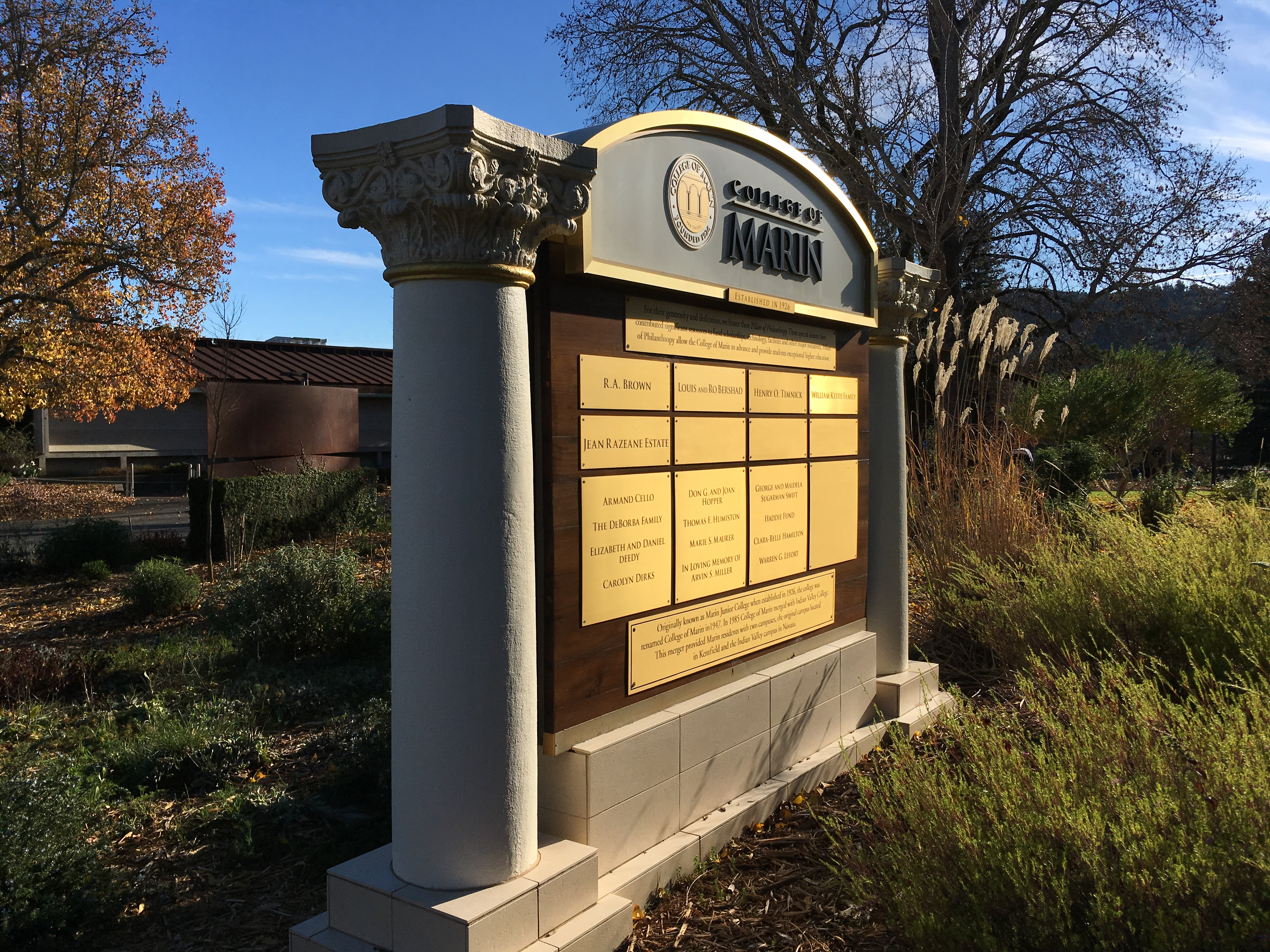
Kentfield campus main sign

Originally known as Marin Junior College when established in 1926, the college was renamed College of Marin in 1947. In 1985 College of Marin merged with Indian Valley College. This merger provided Marin residents with two campuses, the original campus located in Kentfield and the Indian Valley Campus in Novato. The two campuses serve a county population of approximately 250,000 residents.

=== The Echo Times ===
The Echo Times is the college's monthly student-run newspaper.

== Governance ==
The College of Marin is governed as part of the Marin Community College District (MCCD), the community college district serving Marin County, California. MCCD is one of six California community college districts that is considered "basic aid", or "self-supporting", and therefore receives most of its operating revenue from local property taxes rather than State apportionment (since local property tax revenues exceed apportionment figures).

The MCCD is governed by seven members of a board of trustees elected by-area to four-year terms. Elections are held every two years, three members chosen the year after a presidential election and four chosen the year before. The students also elect one non-voting student trustee, who serves a one-year term and can participate in discussions and make and second motions so long as they are not related to real estate negotiations, personnel or collective bargaining.

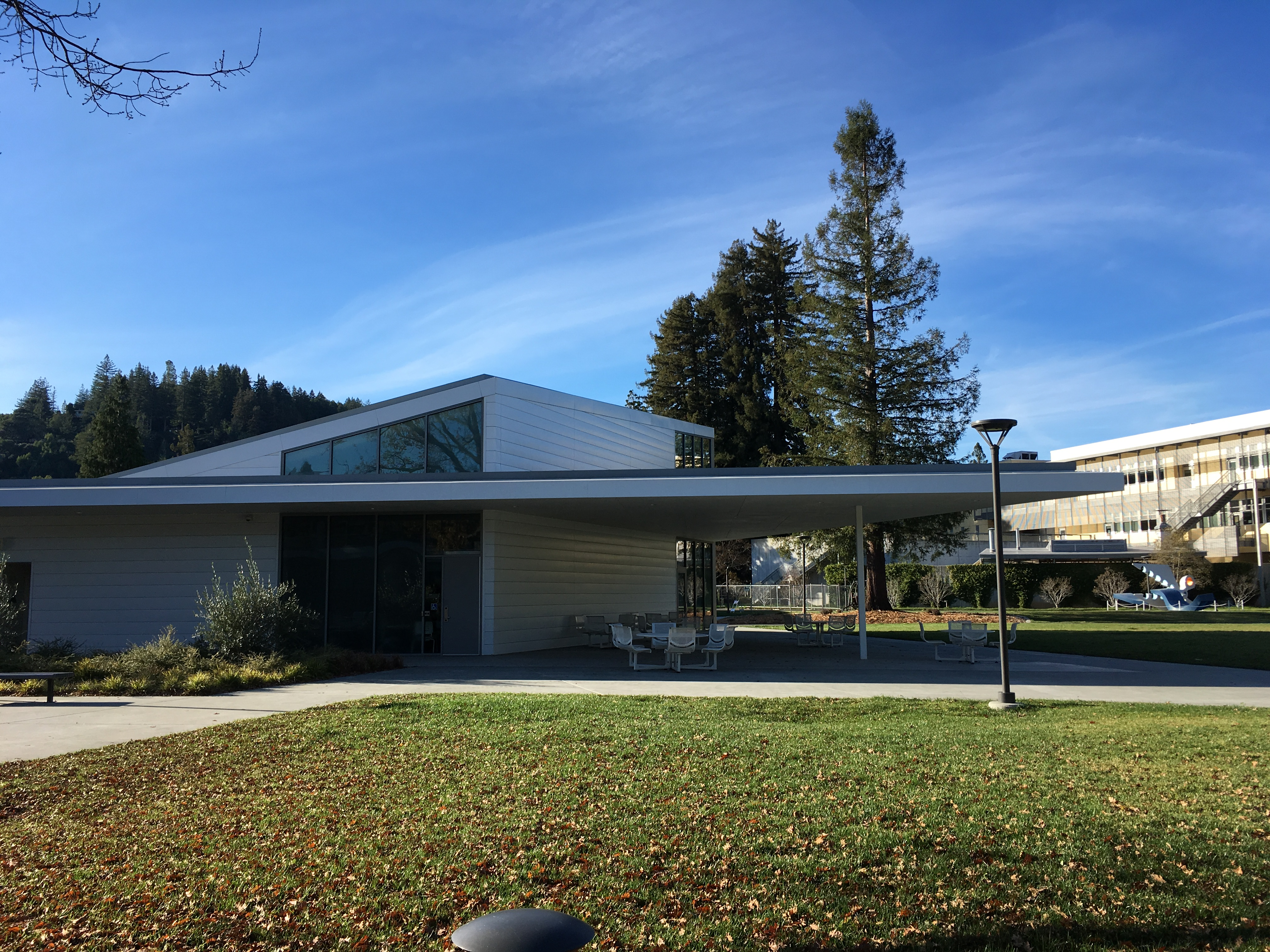
Partial view of the Kentfield campus AC building

== Athletics ==
=== Fall ===
- Soccer (men's and women's)
- Water Polo
- Volleyball

=== Winter ===
- Basketball (men's and women's)

=== Spring ===
- Baseball
- Swimming and Diving
- Track and Field
- Football
- Wrestling

== Student body association ==
In 1927 the students of College of Marin organized an unincorporated association named "The Associated Students of Marin Junior College". On October 8, 1932, they filed in the office of the California Secretary of State a document titled "Articles of Incorporation of The Associated Students of Marin Junior College". The filing of that document transformed The Associated Students of Marin Junior College into a corporation. On March 1, 1991, the students filed a "Certificate of Amendment of Articles of Incorporation". The filing of that amendment changed the corporation's name to "Associated Students College of Marin".

California law provides that, "The governing board of each community college district shall establish, maintain, operate, and govern one or more community colleges". The Board of Trustees of Marin Community College District has authorized the students of the district to organize a "student body association". The district's governing board has recognized that Associated Students College of Marin is a student body association. The governing board has also recognized Associated Students College of Marin "as the official voice for the students in District decision-making processes".

== Notable alumni ==
- Jack Angel, voice actor
- Don Barksdale, NBA Hall of Fame
- Cabot Bigham, professional rallycross driver
- Terry Bozzio, musician, drummer (with Missing Persons (band), Frank Zappa, and UK (band)
- Pete Carroll, American football coach
- Doug Dressler, NFL player
- Konrad Dryden, author
- Elwyn Dunstan, NFL player
- Dian Fossey (business classes, 1949–50), primate research
- David Haskell, actor
- Leslie Hendrix, actor
- Echo Heron, nursing, author (New York Times bestselling), activist
- Honor Jackson, NFL player
- Naomi Judd, nursing, singer/songwriter
- Jim Kent, Research scientist and computer programmer
- Young L, rapper
- Robert Mailer Anderson, author, activist, and philanthropist
- Jennifer Miro, singer, The Nuns (band)
- Erik Raven, United States Under Secretary of the Navy
- Art Schallock, (formerly) oldest living MLB player
- Adam Steltzner (1985–87), NASA engineer at JPL; phase lead and development manager for EDL (Entry, Descent and Landing) of the Curiosity rover lander, which successfully landed on Mars on August 5, 2012
- Roger Stillwell, NFL player
- Scott Thunes (1976–78 music), musician, bassist for Frank Zappa
- Robin Williams (1970–1973 theatre), actor and comedian
