= List of California Golden Bears football seasons =

The following is a list of California Golden Bears football seasons for the football team that has represented University of California, Berkeley in NCAA competition.

== Seasons ==
| Year | Coach | Overall | Conference | Standing | Bowl/playoffs | Coaches^{#} | AP^{°} |
|---|---|---|---|---|---|---|---|
Oscar S. Howard (Independent) (1886)
| 1886 | Oscar S. Howard | 6–2–1 | | | | | |
Independent (1887–1892)
| 1887 | No coach | 4–0 | | | | | |
| 1888 | No coach | 6–1 | | | | | |
| 1889 | No team | 0–0 | | | | | |
| 1890 | No coach | 4–0 | | | | | |
| 1891 | No coach | 0–1 | | | | | |
| 1892 (spring) | No coach | 4–2 | | | | | |
Lee McClung (Independent) (1892)
| 1892 | Lee McClung | 2–1–1 | | | | | |
Pudge Heffelfinger (Independent) (1893)
| 1893 | Pudge Heffelfinger | 5–1–1 | | | | | |
Charles O. Gill (Independent) (1894)
| 1894 | Charles O. Gill | 0–1–2 | | | | | |
Frank Butterworth (Independent) (1895–1896)
| 1895 | Frank Butterworth | 3–1–1 | | | | | |
| 1896 | Frank Butterworth | 6–2–2 | | | | | |
Charles Nott (Independent) (1897)
| 1897 | Charles Nott | 0–3–2 | | | | | |
Garrett Cochran (Independent) (1898–1899)
| 1898 | Garrett Cochran | 8–0–2 | | | | | |
| 1899 | Garrett Cochran | 7–1–1 | | | | | |
Addison Kelly (Independent) (1900)
| 1900 | Addison Kelly | 4–2–1 | | | | | |
Frank W. Simpson (Independent) (1901)
| 1901 | Frank W. Simpson | 9–0–1 | | | | | |
James Whipple (Independent) (1902–1903)
| 1902 | James Whipple | 8–0 | | | | | |
| 1903 | James Whipple | 6–1–2 | | | | | |
James Hopper (Independent) (1904)
| 1904 | James Hopper | 6–1–1 | | | | | |
J. W. Knibbs (Independent) (1905)
| 1905 | J. W. Knibbs | 4–1–2 | | | | | |
Rugby Team (Independent) (1906–1914)
| 1906–14 | No team | (Note: Cal played rugby instead of football from 1882–85 and 1906–14 (see below for rugby season records).) | | | | | |
James Schaeffer (Independent) (1915)
| 1915 | James Schaeffer | 8–5 | | | | | |
Andy Smith (Pacific Coast Conference) (1916–1925)
| 1916 | Andy Smith | 6–4–1 | 0–3 | 4th | | | |
| 1917 | Andy Smith | 5–5–1 | 2–1 | 2nd | | | |
| 1918 | Andy Smith | 7–2 | 2–0 | 1st | | | |
| 1919 | Andy Smith | 6–2–1 | 2–2 | T–3rd | | | |
| 1920 | Andy Smith | 9–0 | 3–0 | T–1st | W Rose | | |
| 1921 | Andy Smith | 9–0–1 | 4–0 | T–1st | T Rose | | |
| 1922 | Andy Smith | 9–0 | 4–0 | T–1st | | | |
| 1923 | Andy Smith | 9–0–1 | 5–0 | T–1st | | | |
| 1924 | Andy Smith | 8–0–2 | 2–0–2 | 2nd | | | |
| 1925 | Andy Smith | 6–3 | 2–2 | 5th | | | |
Nibs Price (Pacific Coast Conference) (1926–1930)
| 1926 | Nibs Price | 3–6 | 0–5 | 9th | | | |
| 1927 | Nibs Price | 7–3 | 2–3 | T–5th | | | |
| 1928 | Nibs Price | 6–2–2 | 3–0–2 | 2nd | L Rose | | |
| 1929 | Nibs Price | 7–1–1 | 4–1 | T–3rd | | | |
| 1930 | Nibs Price | 4–5 | 1–4 | T–8th | | | |
Bill Ingram (Pacific Coast Conference) (1931–1934)
| 1931 | Bill Ingram | 8–2 | 4–1 | 2nd | | | |
| 1932 | Bill Ingram | 7–3–2 | 2–2–1 | T–5th | | | |
| 1933 | Bill Ingram | 6–3–2 | 2–2–2 | 6th | | | |
| 1934 | Bill Ingram | 6–6 | 3–2 | 5th | | | |
Stub Allison (Pacific Coast Conference) (1935–1944)
| 1935 | Stub Allison | 9–1 | 4–1 | T–1st | | | |
| 1936 | Stub Allison | 6–5 | 4–3 | 4th | | | |
| 1937 | Stub Allison | 10–0–1 | 6–0–1 | 1st | W Rose | | 2 |
| 1938 | Stub Allison | 10–1 | 6–1 | T–1st | | | 14 |
| 1939 | Stub Allison | 3–7 | 2–5 | 8th | | | |
| 1940 | Stub Allison | 4–6 | 3–4 | 6th | | | |
| 1941 | Stub Allison | 4–5 | 3–4 | 7th | | | |
| 1942 | Stub Allison | 5–5 | 3–4 | 7th | | | |
| 1943 | Stub Allison | 4–6 | 2–2 | 2nd | | | |
| 1944 | Stub Allison | 3–6–1 | 1–3–1 | 4th | | | |
Buck Shaw (Pacific Coast Conference) (1945)
| 1945 | Buck Shaw | 4–5–1 | 2–4–1 | 6th | | | |
Frank Wickhorst (Pacific Coast Conference) (1946)
| 1946 | Frank Wickhorst | 2–7 | 1–6 | 9th | | | |
Pappy Waldorf (Pacific Coast Conference) (1947–1956)
| 1947 | Pappy Waldorf | 9–1 | 5–1 | T–2nd | | | 15 |
| 1948 | Pappy Waldorf | 10–1 | 6–0 | T–1st | L Rose | | 4 |
| 1949 | Pappy Waldorf | 10–1 | 7–0 | 1st | L Rose | | 3 |
| 1950 | Pappy Waldorf | 9–1–1 | 5–0–1 | 1st | L Rose | 4 | 5 |
| 1951 | Pappy Waldorf | 8–2 | 5–2 | 3rd | | | 12 |
| 1952 | Pappy Waldorf | 7–3 | 3–3 | 4th | | | |
| 1953 | Pappy Waldorf | 4–4–2 | 2–2–2 | 4th | | | |
| 1954 | Pappy Waldorf | 5–5 | 4–3 | 4th | | | |
| 1955 | Pappy Waldorf | 2–7–1 | 1–5–1 | T–7th | | | |
| 1956 | Pappy Waldorf | 3–7 | 2–5 | 8th | | | |
Pete Elliott (Pacific Coast Conference / AAWU) (1957–1959)
| 1957 | Pete Elliott | 1–9 | 1–6 | T–7th | | | |
| 1958 | Pete Elliott | 7–4 | 6–1 | 1st | L Rose | | 16 |
| 1959 | Pete Elliott | 2–8 | 1–3 | 4th | | | |
Marv Levy (Athletic Association of Western Universities) (1960–1963)
| 1960 | Marv Levy | 2–7–1 | 1–3 | 4th | | | |
| 1961 | Marv Levy | 1–8–1 | 1–3 | T–4th | | | |
| 1962 | Marv Levy | 1–9 | 0–4 | 6th | | | |
| 1963 | Marv Levy | 4–5–1 | 1–3 | 5th | | | |
Ray Willsey (Athletic Association of Western Universities / Pac-8) (1964–1971)
| 1964 | Ray Willsey | 3–7 | 0–4 | 8th | | | |
| 1965 | Ray Willsey | 5–5 | 2–3 | T–5th | | | |
| 1966 | Ray Willsey | 3–7 | 2–3 | 5th | | | |
| 1967 | Ray Willsey | 5–5 | 2–3 | 6th | | | |
| 1968 | Ray Willsey | 7–3–1 | 2–2–1 | 4th | | | |
| 1969 | Ray Willsey | 5–5 | 2–4 | 6th | | | |
| 1970 | Ray Willsey | 6–5 | 4–3 | T–2nd | | | |
| 1971 | Ray Willsey | 6–5 | 4–3 | T–3rd | | | |
Mike White (Pac-8 Conference) (1972–1977)
| 1972 | Mike White | 3–8 | 3–4 | 5th | | | |
| 1973 | Mike White | 4–7 | 2–5 | T–5th | | | |
| 1974 | Mike White | 7–3–1 | 4–2–1 | T–3rd | | | |
| 1975 | Mike White | 8–3 | 6–1 | T–1st | | 15 | 14 |
| 1976 | Mike White | 5–6 | 3–4 | T–4th | | | |
| 1977 | Mike White | 8–3 (Note: Record adjusted for UCLA forfeit.) | 4–3 | 4th | | | |
Roger Theder (Pac-10 Conference) (1978–1981)
| 1978 | Roger Theder | 6–5 | 3–4 | T–6th | | | |
| 1979 | Roger Theder | 7–5 (Note: Record adjusted for Oregon forfeit.) | 6–3 | 5th | L Garden State | | |
| 1980 | Roger Theder | 3–8 | 3–5 | 9th | | | |
| 1981 | Roger Theder | 2–9 | 2–6 | 8th | | | |
Joe Kapp (Pac-10 Conference) (1982–1986)
| 1982 | Joe Kapp | 7–4 | 4–4 | 6th | | | |
| 1983 | Joe Kapp | 5–5–1 | 3–4–1 | 8th | | | |
| 1984 | Joe Kapp | 2–9 | 1–8 | 10th | | | |
| 1985 | Joe Kapp | 4–7 | 2–7 | 10th | | | |
| 1986 | Joe Kapp | 2–9 | 2–7 | 9th | | | |
Bruce Snyder (Pac-10 Conference) (1987–1991)
| 1987 | Bruce Snyder | 3–6–2 | 2–3–2 | 8th | | | |
| 1988 | Bruce Snyder | 5–5–1 | 1–5–1 | 10th | | | |
| 1989 | Bruce Snyder | 4–7 | 2–6 | 10th | | | |
| 1990 | Bruce Snyder | 7–4–1 | 4–3–1 | 4th | W Copper | | |
| 1991 | Bruce Snyder | 10–2 | 6–2 | T–2nd | W Florida Citrus | 7 | 8 |
Keith Gilbertson (Pac-10 Conference) (1992–1995)
| 1992 | Keith Gilbertson | 4–7 | 2–6 | 9th | | | |
| 1993 | Keith Gilbertson | 9–4 | 4–4 | T–4th | W Alamo | 24 | 25 |
| 1994 | Keith Gilbertson | 4–7 | 3–5 | T–5th | | | |
| 1995 | Keith Gilbertson | 3–8 | 2–6 | T–8th | | | |
Steve Mariucci (Pac-10 Conference) (1996)
| 1996 | Steve Mariucci | 6–6 | 3–5 | T–5th | L Aloha | | |
Tom Holmoe (Pac-10 Conference) (1997–2001)
| 1997 | Tom Holmoe | 3–8 | 1–7 | 9th | | | |
| 1998 | Tom Holmoe | 5–6 | 3–5 | 7th | | | |
| 1999 | Tom Holmoe | 0–7 (Note: Record adjusted for four California vacated wins.) | 0–5 | T–6th | | | |
| 2000 | Tom Holmoe | 3–8 | 2–6 | T–8th | | | |
| 2001 | Tom Holmoe | 1-10 | 0-8 | 10th | | | |
Jeff Tedford (Pac-10 / Pac-12 Conference) (2002–2012)
| 2002 | Jeff Tedford | 7–5 | 4–4 | T–4th | | | |
| 2003 | Jeff Tedford | 8–6 | 5–3 | T–3rd | W Insight | | |
| 2004 | Jeff Tedford | 10–2 | 7–1 | 2nd | L Holiday | 9 | 9 |
| 2005 | Jeff Tedford | 8–4 | 4–4 | T–4th | W Las Vegas | 25 | 25 |
| 2006 | Jeff Tedford | 10–3 | 7–2 | T–1st | W Holiday | 14 | 14 |
| 2007 | Jeff Tedford | 7–6 | 3–6 | T–7th | W Armed Forces | | |
| 2008 | Jeff Tedford | 9–4 | 6–3 | 4th | W Emerald | 25 | |
| 2009 | Jeff Tedford | 8–5 | 5–4 | T–5th | L Poinsettia | | |
| 2010 | Jeff Tedford | 5–7 | 3–6 | 8th | | | |
| 2011 | Jeff Tedford | 7–6 | 4–5 | 4th (North) | L Holiday | | |
| 2012 | Jeff Tedford | 3–9 | 2–7 | 5th (North) | | | |
Sonny Dykes (Pac-12 Conference) (2013–2016)
| 2013 | Sonny Dykes | 1–11 | 0–9 | 6th (North) | | | |
| 2014 | Sonny Dykes | 5–7 | 3–6 | 4th (North) | | | |
| 2015 | Sonny Dykes | 8–5 | 4–5 | T–4th (North) | W Armed Forces | | |
| 2016 | Sonny Dykes | 5–7 | 3–6 | T–4th (North) | | | |
Justin Wilcox (Pac-12 Conference) (2017–2023)
| 2017 | Justin Wilcox | 5–7 | 2–7 | 5th (North) | | | |
| 2018 | Justin Wilcox | 7–6 | 4–5 | 5th (North) | L Cheez-It | | |
| 2019 | Justin Wilcox | 8–5 | 4–5 | T–2nd (North) | W Redbox | | |
| 2020 | Justin Wilcox | 1–3 | 1–3 | T–5th (North) | | | |
| 2021 | Justin Wilcox | 5–7 | 4–5 | 4th (North) | | | |
| 2022 | Justin Wilcox | 4–8 | 2–7 | 9th | | | |
| 2023 | Justin Wilcox | 6–7 | 4–5 | 7th | L Independence | | |
Justin Wilcox (Atlantic Coast Conference) (2024–2025)
| 2024 | Justin Wilcox | 6–7 | 2–6 | T–14th | L LA | | |
| 2025 | Justin Wilcox (Note: Wilcox, who was in his ninth season as head coach, was fired on November 23. Senior offensive assistant Nick Rolovich assumed interim head coaching duties for the final regular season game and bowl game.) | 7–6 | 4–4 | T–7th | L Hawaii | | |
Tosh Lupoi (Atlantic Coast Conference) (2026–present)
| 2026 | Tosh Lupoi | 0-0 | | | | | |
| Total: | | 707–584–51 | | | | | |
National championship Conference title Conference division title or championship game berth
^{†}Indicates Bowl Coalition, Bowl Alliance, BCS, or CFP / New Years' Six bowl.; ^{#}Rankings from final Coaches Poll.

== Rugby ==
Cal played rugby in various years instead of football and includes these rugby seasons within their football results with callout notes.

| Year | W | L | T | PF | PA |
|---|---|---|---|---|---|
| 1882–83 | 2 | 1 | 1 | 24 | 13 |
| 1884 | 2 | 0 | 0 | 27 | 0 |
| 1885 | 4 | 0 | 1 | 23 | 0 |
| 1906 | 2 | 4 | 0 | 19 | 20 |
| 1907 | 4 | 3 | 0 | 67 | 42 |
| 1908 | 7 | 3 | 1 | 114 | 46 |
| 1909 | 12 | 3 | 1 | 268 | 57 |
| 1910 | 12 | 0 | 2 | 279 | 27 |
| 1911 | 11 | 2 | 1 | 256 | 34 |
| 1912 | 10 | 2 | 1 | 144 | 58 |
| 1913 | 6 | 3 | 3 | 105 | 110 |
| 1914 | 14 | 1 | 0 | 276 | 60 |
