= List of California Golden Bears head football coaches =

The California Golden Bears college football team represents the University of California, Berkeley in the Atlantic Coast Conference (ACC). Until 2023 it formed part of the North Division of the Pac-12 Conference (Pac-12). The Golden Bears compete as part of the National Collegiate Athletic Association (NCAA) Division I Football Bowl Subdivision. The program has had 34 head coaches since it began play during the 1886 season. Since December 2025, Tosh Lupoi is serving as the interim head football coach of California Golden Bears.

Jeff Tedford (2002–12) is the leader in seasons coached (11), games won (82), and bowl appearances (8). Pappy Waldorf (1948–56) led the team to three Rose Bowl games from 1948 to 1950. Andy Smith (1916–25) has the highest winning percentage (.799) of any coach (minimum 3 seasons).

== Key ==
Key to symbols in coaches list
General		Overall		Conference		Postseason (Note: Although the first Rose Bowl Game was played in 1902, it has been continuously played since the 1916 game, and is recognized as the oldest bowl game by the NCAA. "—" indicates any season prior to 1916 when postseason games were not played.)	
No.	Order of coaches (Note: A running total of the number of head coaches, with coaches who served separate tenures being counted only once. Interim head coaches are represented with "Int" and are not counted in the running total. "—" indicates the team played but either without a coach or no coach is on record. "X" indicates an interim year without play.)	GC	Games coached	CW	Conference wins	PW	Postseason wins
DC	Division championships	OW	Overall wins	CL	Conference losses	PL	Postseason losses
CC	Conference championships	OL	Overall losses	CT	Conference ties	PT	Postseason ties
NC	National championships	OT	Overall ties (Note: Overtime rules in college football were introduced in 1996, making ties impossible in the period since.)	C%	Conference winning percentage		
†	Elected to the College Football Hall of Fame	O%	Overall winning percentage (Note: When computing the win–loss percentage, a tie counts as half a win and half a loss.)				

== Coaches ==
List of head football coaches showing season(s) coached, overall records, conference records, postseason records, championships and selected awards (Note: Statistics correct as of the end of the 2025 NCAA Division I FBS football season.)
No.	Name (Note: California did not have a head coach for their 1882–1884, 1887–1888, and 1890–1892 seasons.)	Season(s) (Note: From 1906 to 1914, rugby was played instead of football and Oscar Taylor served as head coach, from 1906 to 1908. Jimmie Schaeffer, coached rugby from 1909 to 1914 and football in 1915. California also did not field teams for their 1889 season)	GC	OW	OL	OT	O%	CW	CL	CT	C%	PW	PL	PT	CC	NC	Awards
1	Oscar S. Howard	1886	9	6	2	1	0.722	—	—	—	—	—	—	—	—	—	—
2	Lee McClung	1892	4	2	1	1	0.625	—	—	—	—	—	—	—	—	—	—
3	Pudge Heffelfinger	1893	7	5	1	1	0.786	—	—	—	—	—	—	—	—	—	—
4	Charles O. Gill	1894	3	0	1	2	0.333	—	—	—	—	—	—	—	—	—	—
5	Frank Butterworth	1895–1896	15	9	3	3	0.700	—	—	—	—	—	—	—	—	—	—
6	Charles P. Nott	1897	5	0	3	2	0.200	—	—	—	—	—	—	—	—	—	—
7	Garrett Cochran^{†}	1898–1899	19	15	1	3	0.868	—	—	—	—	—	—	—	—	—	—
8	Addison Kelly	1900	7	4	2	1	0.643	—	—	—	—	—	—	—	—	—	—
9	Frank W. Simpson	1901	10	9	0	1	0.950	—	—	—	—	—	—	—	—	—	—
10	James Whipple	1902–1903	17	14	1	2	0.882	—	—	—	—	—	—	—	—	—	—
11	James Hopper	1904	8	6	1	1	0.813	—	—	—	—	—	—	—	—	—	—
12	J. W. Knibbs	1905	7	4	1	2	0.714	—	—	—	—	—	—	—	—	—	—
13	Jimmie Schaeffer	1915	13	8	5	0	0.615	—	—	—	—	—	—	—	—	—	—
14	Andy Smith^{†}	1916–1925	97	74	16	7	0.799	26	8	2	0.750	1	0	1	5	4; 1920; 1921; 1922; 1923	—
15	Nibs Price	1926–1930	47	27	17	3	0.606	10	13	2	0.440	0	1	0	0	—	—
16	Bill Ingram^{†}	1931–1934	45	27	14	4	0.644	11	7	3	0.595	0	0	0	0	—	—
17	Stub Allison	1935–1944	102	58	42	2	0.578	34	27	2	0.556	1	0	0	3	1; 1937	—
18	Buck Shaw	1945	10	4	5	1	0.450	2	4	1	0.357	0	0	0	0	—	—
19	Frank Wickhorst	1946	9	2	7	0	0.222	1	6	0	0.143	0	0	0	0	—	—
20	Pappy Waldorf^{†}	1947–1956	103	67	32	4	0.670	40	21	4	0.646	0	3	0	3	—	—
21	Pete Elliott^{†}	1957–1959	31	10	21	0	0.323	8	10	0	0.444	0	1	0	1	—	—
22	Marv Levy	1960–1963	40	8	29	3	0.238	3	13	0	0.188	0	0	0	0	—	—
23	Ray Willsey	1964–1971	83	40	42	1	0.488	18	25	1	0.420	0	0	0	0	—	—
24	Mike White	1972–1977	66	35	30	1	0.538	21	19	1	0.524	0	0	0	1	—	—
25	Roger Theder	1978–1981	45	17	28	0	0.378	13	19	0	0.406	0	1	0	0	—	—
26	Joe Kapp	1982–1986	55	20	34	1	0.373	12	30	1	0.291	0	0	0	0	—	—
27	Bruce Snyder	1987–1991	57	29	24	4	0.544	15	19	4	0.447	2	0	0	0	—	—
28	Keith Gilbertson	1992–1995	46	20	26	0	0.435	11	21	0	0.344	1	0	0	0	—	—
29	Steve Mariucci	1996	12	6	6	—	0.500	3	5	—	0.375	0	1	—	0	—	—
30	Tom Holmoe (Note: Under Holmoe, Cal finished 4–7 (3–5 in conference) in 1999, but later vacated the wins due to use of ineligible players.)	1997–2001	51	12	39	—	0.235	6	31	—	0.162	0	0	—	0	—	—
31	Jeff Tedford	2002–2012	139	82	57	—	0.590	50	45	—	0.526	5	3	—	1	—	—
32	Sonny Dykes	2013–2016	49	19	30	—	0.388	10	26	—	0.278	1	0	—	0	—	—
33	Justin Wilcox	2017–2025	103	48	55	—	0.466	26	47	—	0.356	1	3	—	0	—	—
Int	Nick Rolovich (Note: In 2025 Nick Rolovich served as interim head coach after Justin Wilcox was fired.)	2025	2	1	1	—	0.500	1	0	—	1.000	0	1	—	0	—	—
34	Tosh Lupoi	2026–present	4	2	2	—	0.500	1	1	—	0.500	0	0	—	0	—	—
