= History of California Golden Bears football =

The history of California Golden Bears football began in 1886, the team has won five NCAA recognized national titles - 1920, 1921, 1922, 1923, and 1937 and 15 conference championships, the last one in 2006.

== Overview ==
=== Early history (1886–1981) ===
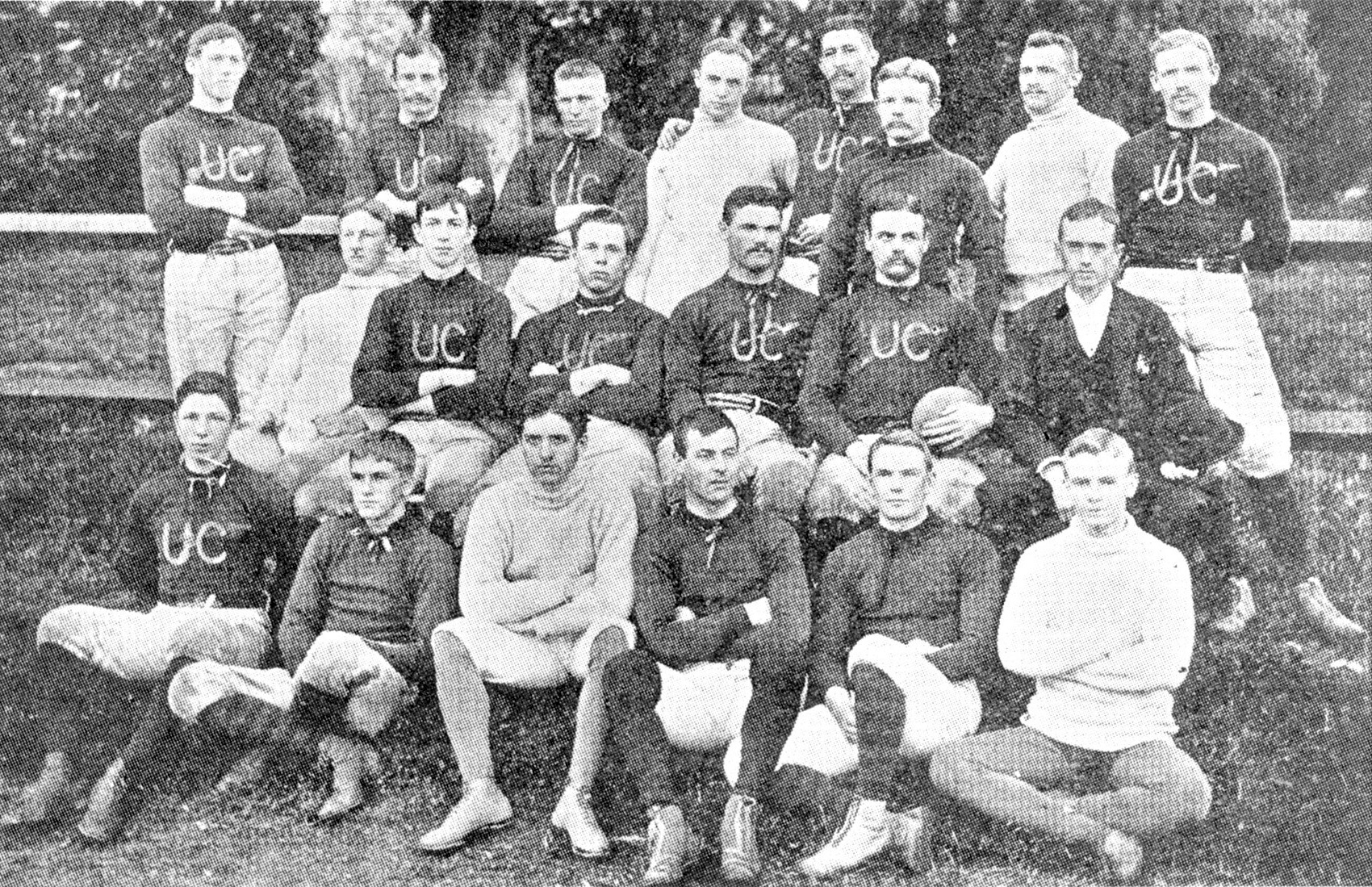
The first Cal team to play Stanford, 1892

Football was first played on Berkeley campus in 1882, albeit in a form that resembled rugby. It was not until 1886 under coach Oscar S. Howard that the University of California began to play American football. Aside from the first season's matches against Hastings Law College, Cal primarily played against local clubs in the San Francisco Bay Area. From 1886 until 1903 California home games were held at West Field, at the current campus location of the Valley Life Sciences Building. Eventually bleachers were added allowing seating up to 5,000 people. In 1892, the school played against rival Stanford University for the first time – an annual matchup now known as The Big Game. The first match was organized in San Francisco by Cal's student manager Herbert Lang, and Stanford's student manager and future president of the United States Herbert Hoover. Cal lost 14–10. Their coach was Lee McClung. Another Yale alum was their coach in 1893, Pudge Heffelfinger; and again in 1895, Frank Butterworth. Cal's first win against Stanford came in 1898, while coached by newly hired Garrett Cochran, a Princeton alumnus who was recruited immediately after his graduation. Cochran successfully implemented the tactics of his alma mater, finishing the season with eight wins, zero losses and two ties; all opponents were outscored 221–5. That season also included Cal's first out of state football game - when it traveled to Portland, Oregon to defeat Multnomah Athletic Club. In 1899, Cal added the University of Oregon and San Jose State to its schedule. No team was able to score against Cal during that season with Stanford being defeated 22–0. In 1899, Cochran made a bold claim that his undefeated Bears were as good as any team on the east coast. The future legendary coach Pop Warner decided to take on Cochran's challenge, and brought his Pennsylvania team - the Carlisle Indian Industrial School Indians to take on Cal. Even though it was Warner's first year at Carlisle, his team was considered to be an overwhelming favorite. It upset Penn and handed a crushing defeat to Columbia. The game took place on Christmas Day in San Francisco. It was Carlisle that emerged as the winner, however Warner's offense that scored 45 points against Columbia was unable to put up any against Cal. Cal lost 0–2, due to a safety given up in the second half. Despite the loss, the game signaled Cal's ability to compete with the eastern schools.

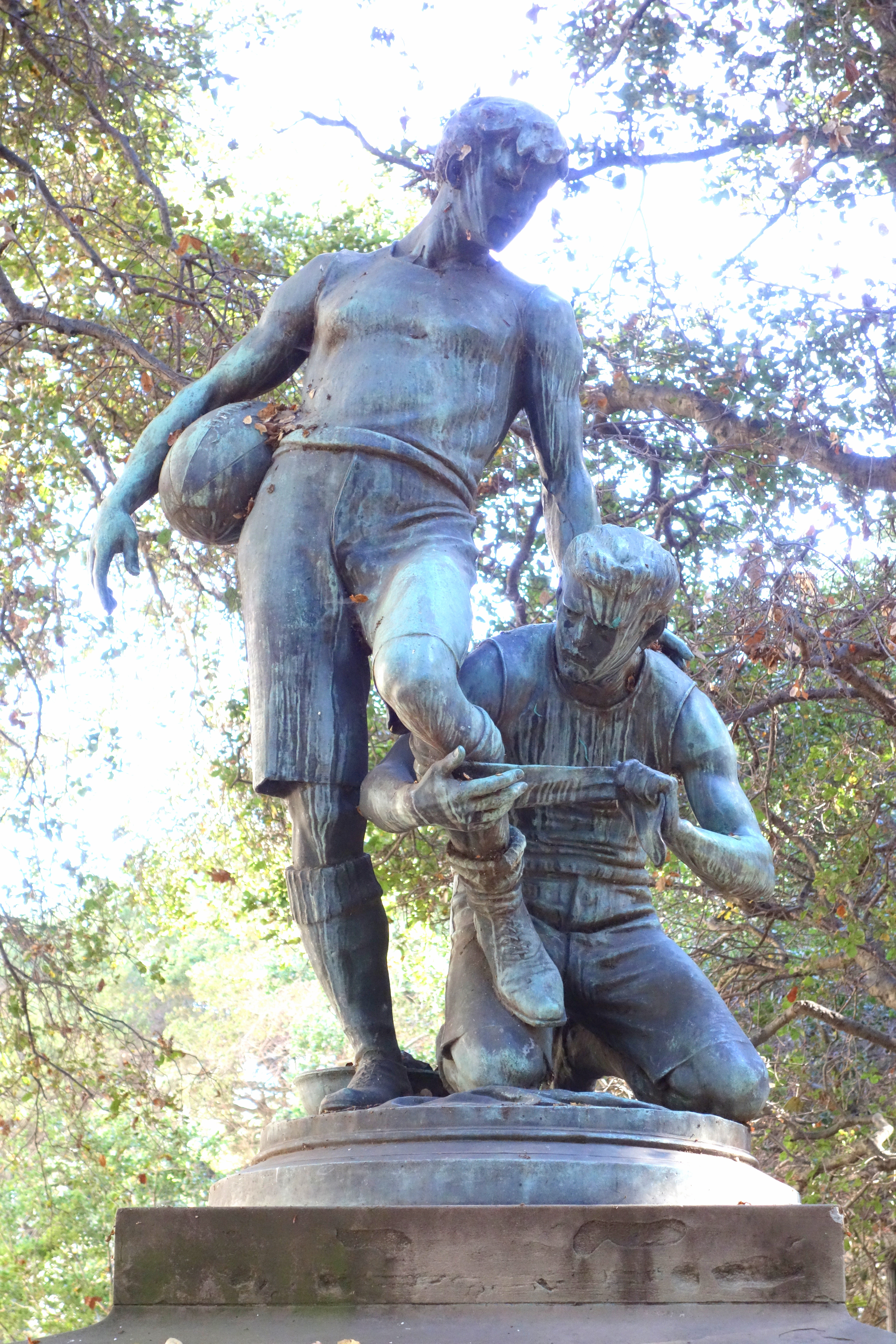
Douglas Tilden's The Football Players

Prior to the 1898 season, Berkeley alumnus and San Francisco Mayor James D. Phelan offered Douglas Tilden's sculpture The Football Players, as a prize to the school that could win the Big Game two consecutive seasons years. Because of Cal's 1898 and 1899 wins, in May 1900 the sculpture was installed on the Berkeley campus. It was placed atop a stone pedestal engraved with the names of the California players during those two years. From the moment of its installation, the Football Players has been considered to be one of the landmarks on campus.

Following the 1899 season, Cochran left to coach at the Naval Academy and was replaced by another Princeton alumnus - Addison Kelly, who served for only one season in 1900, posting a 4–2–1 record. That year's Big Game was played on Thanksgiving Day at the Recreation Park stadium in the industrial section of San Francisco. The game was sold out with 19,000 spectators packing the seats. In addition somewhere between 500 and 1,000 men, were watching the match from the corrugated rooftop of the operating S.F. and Pacific Glass Works factory. During the game the rooftop collapsed, resulting in well over 100 fans falling on to the factory's floor with more than 60 directly on to the factory's massive, operational furnace. In total 22 men, mostly boys, were killed with more than 100 severely injured. This incident became known as the Thanksgiving Day Disaster and remains the deadliest accident to kill spectators at a U.S. sporting event. Stanford won the game 5–0. In 1904, Cal began playing its home games at California Field. It held approximately 20,000 people and was located near the center of the campus, the current location of the Hearst Gymnasium.

Beginning in the 1890s, American football was becoming increasingly violent - the ball carrier would often be pushed and pulled up the field by his own players in massive formations that often resulted in serious injuries. In 1905, 18 deaths and 159 injuries were reported in various football competitions. That year President Theodore Roosevelt lobbied the elite private schools to alter the game in order to eliminate or at least reduce its prevalent injuries. Soon after, numerous rule changes were agreed upon by the majority of American schools. One of the changes was allowing for a forward pass to open up the game and reduce the role of the dangerous mass formations. Cal, Stanford and other West Coast universities, took a different path - eliminating football completely and instead changing their sport to Rugby. A sport thought to be less barbaric. Amongst others, Nevada, St. Mary's, Santa Clara, and USC (in 1911) also made this alteration. During the rugby years - from 1906 to 1914, California wielded dominant teams, however Bears were able to beat Stanford only three times. Due to various causes, including students frustration with those results, the Associated Students of the University of California voted to leave the agreement, and along with other universities, return to American football. Beginning in 1915 Cal returned to the original sport and has fielded a football team ever since. During the initial season Cal was coached by its former rugby coach Jimmy Schaeffer. In 1916, Andy Smith, then coach at Purdue, was recruited to become Cal's next football coach. That year was the first year of the Pacific Coast Conference. The original PCC consisted of Cal, Washington, Oregon and Oregon Agricultural (which would later become Oregon State). The 1916 team had a winning season however it failed to win any games in the conference. The first truly successful season was in 1918, the team went 7–2, won the conference and defeated Stanford 67–0. The teams agreed not to count it as a Big Game match as it was Stanford's first season after switching back from Rugby. Smith came to be known for the "kick and wait for the breaks" strategy and utilizing the short punt formation. Under his system, the ball was mainly moved upfield not through offensive plays, but through punting. Upon the other team receiving the ball, the defense was relied upon to push it back up the field and cause fumbles. (Note: To confuse the opponent, the punting could be done on first or second downs.) At the end of 1918, lineman Walter Gordon, Cal's first African-American player, became the second black All-American in the country. (Note: The first was Rutgers Defensive End Paul Robeson chosen in 1917. Gordon and Robeson were both inducted into the College Football Hall of Fame.) The same year Smith hired former Cal rugby player and San Diego high school football coach Nibs Price. Price was essential to recruiting southern California's Brick Muller, Albert "Pesky" Sprott, Crip Toomey and Stanley Barnes, who became the key players of Smith's dominating squads that became known as Wonder Teams. With the emergence of the talented squads, Smith also became known for trick plays such as the classic lateral to the halfback, followed by a long forward pass. Brick Muller, both an offensive and defensive star, became known for completing 50-yard passes that were previously thought impossible - at the time the game was played with a plump, rugby-like ball.

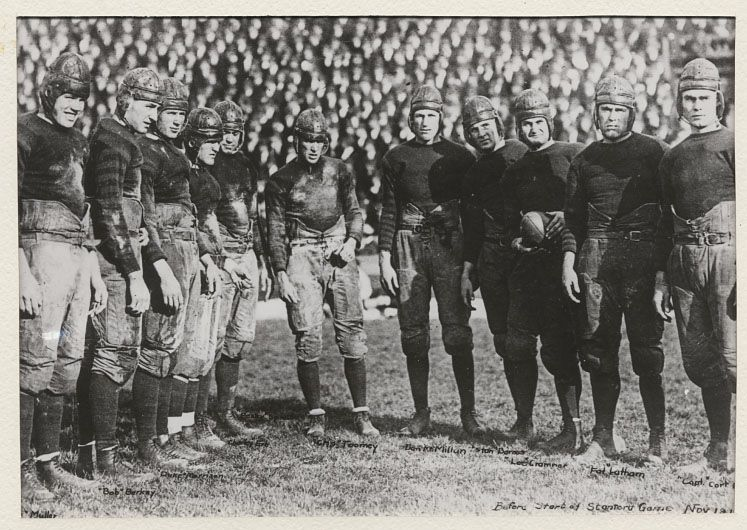
1920 team

From 1920 to 1925, The Wonder Teams went 50 straight games without defeat, made three trips to the Rose Bowl, and won four national titles as determined by various selectors - 1920, 1921, 1922 and 1923. Prior to the start of the 1920 season Brick Muller and Albert Sprott competed as track and field athletes in the 1920 Summer Olympics in Belgium, where Muller won the silver medal in high jump. The 1920 team went 9–0, winning the PCC title (which now included Washington State and Stanford), out-scoring its opponents 510–14; at the Rose Bowl it shut out undefeated Big Ten champion Ohio State 28–0. During that game Muller threw a 53-yard touchdown pass, caught two passes, made several vital tackles, as well as recovered three fumbles. Even though the two would never meet, Smith's Wonder Teams are thought to rival Notre Dame coach Knute Rockne and his Four Horsemen. In 1960, when the Helms Athletic Foundation considered both the Wonder Teams and the Four Horsemen, it crowned the 1920 Cal Bears as the greatest football team in American history. The 1921 Golden Bears finished undefeated and were again invited to play in the Rose Bowl. The Big Ten declined to send its champion Iowa, and a little known team from Pennsylvania, named the Washington and Jefferson Presidents were invited. Smith was at first hesitant as Presidents had players older than the average college age, and at the same time had scholarship requirements well below California's. Eventually Smith agreed to the match. With California being the overwhelming favorite, the match went nothing like it was expected. Because of the heavy rain the night before, it was played in a virtual mud pit. The game finished in a 0–0 tie. The 1922 team was also undefeated and won the PCC. At this time University of California began considering the Rose Bowl as being "too commercialized" and declined that year's invitation. Like the previous two years, the majority of national selectors determined Cal to be the national champion. During Big Games the California Field consistently exceeded its seating limits by several thousand fans.

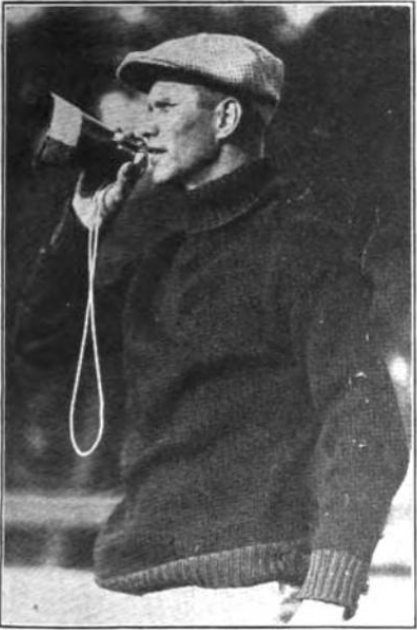
Andy Smith, 1922

Because of Cal's continuous success it became evident that a larger stadium was needed. (Note: During Big Games the California Field consistently exceeded its seating limits by several thousand fans.) In 1919 Stanford Stadium opened, holding more than 60,000 fans, and during the next several years the Rose Bowl stadium was constructed as well as the Los Angeles Coliseum which became the host of USC. In 1922 work began on California Memorial Stadium, which was to be located the mouth of Strawberry Canyon immediately east of campus. Because it would be directly atop the Hayward Fault, it consisted of two halves, with the eastern side built into the canyon's hills, while the western side contained the main structure built in the neo-classical style of the Roman Coliseum. Expansion joints were placed where the two sides connected, allowing them to separately move during an earthquake. During the construction 2,500 pine trees were planted on the hill behind the stadium, which became known as the Tightwad Hill.

The stadium opened for the November 24, 1923 Big Game, where undefeated 8-0 Golden Bears faced 7-1 Stanford. The 72,609 official capacity stadium was overcrowded with more than 73,000 fans with more than 7,000 perched atop Tightwad Hill. The game would be remembered as "dull, dull, dull". Cal won it 9–0, even though Cal's kicker Bill Blewett missed all five of his field goals. At the end of the season, Cal again declined the Rose Bowl invitation. The team was recognized as the national champion in one of the polls, however the majority of polls were split between Illinois and Michigan. In 1924, Cal was again undefeated but tied two games in the conference, as opposed to Stanford who was also undefeated but had only one tie – against Cal. The rivals were PCC co-champions for the year, each holding the Schwabacher trophy for 6 months. It was Stanford that was invited to Pasadena, while Cal scheduled an independent home game against University of Pennsylvania. Penn was also undefeated and considered by some to be the best team of that year. California won that game 14–0. Notre Dame beat Stanford, resulting in almost unanimous national championship going to Knute Rockne and his Four Horsemen. In 1925, the team went 6-3 losing at Stanford 14–26, this was Stanford's first Big Game win since returning to American football in 1919. This season will be remembered for being Cal's last year under coach Andy Smith. On January 8, 1926, he died at 42 years old from pneumonia; his death was unexpected and traumatic for the team and the whole university. Smith left no family, all of his $30,000 estate going towards university and city of Berkeley communities, including a $10,000 football scholarship. In accordance with his wishes, his ashes were scattered over the Memorial Stadium field.

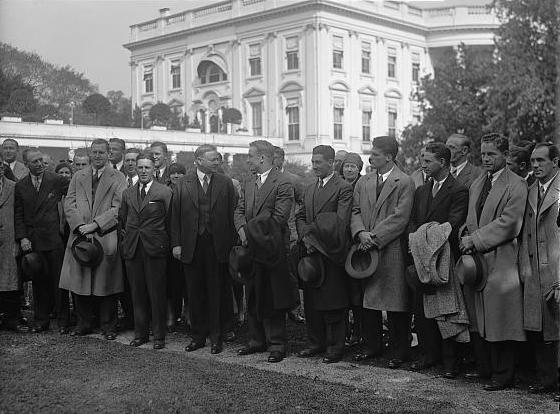
The 1929 team visiting the White House, Nibs Price is to the left of President Hoover.

Following Smith's death, his assistant coach Nibs Price became the new coach of the Golden Bears; that same year he also became the head coach of Cal's basketball team. His initial season was Cal's first losing season since 1897. Not only had most of the team's key players graduated, the team and the university were still recovering from the sudden loss of their inspirational coach. During the next three seasons, Price's successful adoption of Smith's strategy and his continuing recruitment skills became apparent. That period's players are considered to be the final batch of the Wonder Teams. In 1927 and 1928, the teams were undefeated, and the 1928 team was invited to the Rose Bowl to play against Georgia Tech. After recovering a Georgia Tech fumble, Cal's center Roy Riegels inadvertently spun around, and ran the ball towards Cal's endzone instead of Georgia Tech's. Cal's quarterback Benny Lom was able to catch up to and stop Riegels at the 3-yard line, where they were immediately tackled by Georgia Tech players. (Note: A video of the "Wrong Way" Riegels' run can be found here - "Rose Bowl Memory 1929". YouTube.) Price chose to punt rather than risk a play so close to his team's end zone. The punt was blocked in end zone resulting in a safety, giving Georgia Tech a 2–0 lead. These turned out to be the decisive points of Cal's 7–8 loss. Riegel's run has been considered to be one of the stand out moments in Rose Bowl history, with Roy "the wrong way" Riegels being inducted into the Rose Bowl Hall of Fame in 1991. In 1929, the team suffered only a single loss, which was an away game to Stanford; USC won the conference even though it lost its game against Cal. Earlier that season the team traveled to the east coast to defeat Penn 12–7. Prior to that game they were invited to the White House by President Herbert Hoover, who as a Stanford student managed the 1894 team, and along with his Cal counterpart, organized the inaugural Big Game. The fall of 1930 was Price's last season of coaching football. Cal was crushed by both USC and Stanford and could only win one conference game. Price continued to coach basketball, leading the Golden Bears to the 1946 Final Four.

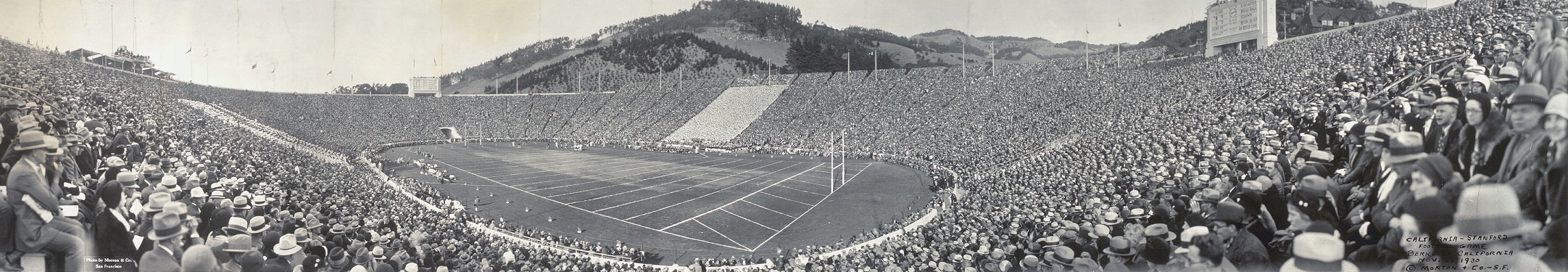
California Memorial Stadium, 1930

California football also achieved success in the 1930s. Nibs Price was replaced by Bill Ingram, then a successful coach at the Naval Academy. (Note: In 1926, he led the Midshipmen to an undefeated record, with the team being considered to national champions in several polls.) In 1931, his first season at Cal, Ingram led the Golden Bears to the 2nd place in the conference. However, the team could not finish higher than fifth during the next three years, leading to Ingram being replaced by his assistant coach Stub Ellison. Beginning in 1935, Ellison led Cal to two conference co-championships and one stand alone title in 1937. The 1937 team was led by the team captain and future member of the College Football Hall of Fame Vic Bottari. Bottari scored the two touchdowns in Cal's 13–0 Rose Bowl win against Alabama. (Note: During that game the Crimson Tide was only able to complete two passes. In its 11 wins during that season Cal posted 7 shutouts. Its opponents could only score 5 touchdowns, while being allowed only 42 completions, 60 first downs, 432 passing yards, and 858 rushing yards. There was only a total of 1,126 total yards gained against it. All of those school records still stand.") Because of its staunch defense, the 1937 squad was coined "The Thunder Team." In its 11 wins, Thunder Team scored 214 points while posting 7 shutouts. ESPN College Football Encyclopedia ranked them above the 1920 Wonder Team, naming them as the best team in school history. The 1938 Rose Bowl was the last one won by the Golden Bears. Next year the team finished second, which would be the highest for the rest of Ellison's career at Cal. During World War II, Cal was unable to field strong teams as players could be drafted at any time during the season. Some schools like Stanford paused their football programs, and out of the nine PCC conference teams only Cal, USC, UCLA and Washington participated in the 1942 and 1943 seasons. During these years Cal would often face teams from military bases, which were allowed to field players that had already completed their college careers. Ellison's last season was in 1946, that year the team could only win one game in the conference.

The 1947 season saw a dramatic turnaround as Lynn "Pappy" Waldorf became the head coach. Upon Pappy's arrival they went to 9–1, with their only loss coming against USC. Known as "Pappy's Boys", the teams of 1947–1950 won 33 consecutive regular season games, earning three conference championships and three Rose Bowl berths. However California lost all three Rose Bowls: 20–14 to Northwestern in 1949, 17–14 to Ohio State in 1950, and 14–6 to Michigan in 1951. Because Cal's return to greatness and Pappy's exuberant character, Pappy became admired by both his players and his fans. He became known for addressing fans after every game from a balcony of the Memorial stadium. In 1953 the NCAA changed the game by canceling a rule that was in place since World War II, a team could no longer make multiple substitutions and have specific players for each position - only one substitution could be made per play. Up to this change Pappy's approach was to use highly specialized players for key positions. Waldorf did not have a winning season following the change. The 1953 season is also associated with a recruiting scandal involving star freshman quarterback Ronnie Knox. In order to have Knox enroll at the university, the California football booster club promised that Knox's step father would be hired as a scout, his high school coach would be hired as an assistant coach, and that Knox himself would be given a job writing for a local newspaper while being paid $500 per year by the booster club. Knox enrolled at Cal but California's administration found out prior to the benefits being provided. Following investigation by both administration and the conference, it was found that Waldorf was not directly involved. After one year Knox transferred to UCLA. Pappy retired at the end of 1956 season when the team went 3–7. His overall record at Cal was 67–32–4. During the late 1950s NCAA kept changing its rules and by 1964 it again allowed unlimited substitutions. One of the star players during Pappy's years was Jackie Jensen. He played from 1947 to 1948, was an All-American and the first Cal player to rush for 1,000 yards. He was also a pitcher and a center fielder for the baseball team, and twice an All-American, led Cal to win the inaugural 1947 College World Series. He left his junior year to play in the major leagues and was the 1958 American League Most Valuable Player as an outfielder.

Pete Elliott became Cal's head coach in 1957. He only won one game that year and two games in 1959. However, in between those two years, California went 6–1 in the PCC, taking first place and earning a spot in the 1959 Rose Bowl. Unfortunately it lost that game to Iowa 38 to 12. One of the highlights of those years was Joe Kapp, who is considered to be one of the greatest players in Cal history. Aside from his skills as a quarterback, he is also remembered for his great character. Completely dedicated to his team and his university, he was considered to be able to push his teammates to perform beyond their limits as well as to fiercely intimidate his opponents. During his NFL years with the Minnesota Vikings he led the team to appear in the 1969 season's Super Bowl. He declined the Viking's most valuable player of the year award because it was the team and not him that deserved it. It was for his ability to transfer his passion and determination that he was offered and accepted the California head coaching job in 1982.

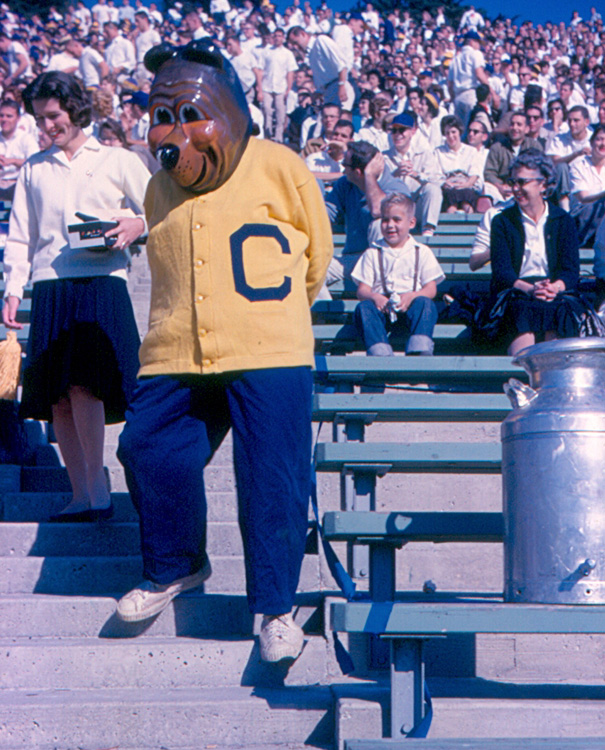
Cal's mascot Oski the Bear, 1961

Marv Levy became the head coach in 1960, with Bill Walsh as one of his assistant coaches; they were at Cal until 1963. Although each would go on to become future Pro Football Hall of Famers - Levy for his coaching with the Buffalo Bills and four straight Super Bowl appearances and Walsh for his three Super Bowl titles with the San Francisco 49ers, they could not produce a single winning season at Cal. Ray Willsey took over the program in 1964. A Cal alumnus, he played under Pappy Waldorf, leading the team as a quarterback in the 1952 season's 26–0 win over Stanford. During his years as coach, Berkeley became a center of counterculture and political protest. This led to significant problems with recruiting – Willsey had to try and commit the recruits while the Berkeley protests and police crackdowns were a regular part of the nightly news. During this decade Cal won the Big Game only twice, in 1960 under Marv Levy and in 1967 under Ray Willsey. Wilsey's recruiting difficulties where finally overcome in 1968, that year's team would come to be known as The Bear Minimum. It was led by linebacker Ed White a consensus All-American and future member of College Hall of Fame, relying on its defense Cal went 7–3–1 and ranking as high as 8th in the AP poll. It won 21–7 at Michigan and beat No. 10 Syracuse 43–0. Earning three shutouts it held its opponents to 10.4 points a game. The Bear Minimum still holds Cal's records for opponents' average gains per play – 3.60, as well as the fewest rushing touchdowns per season – 5 (same as the Thunder Team). Its average yards per rush was 2.51 which is still second only to the 1937 Thunder Team with 2.50 yards per rush. Willsey left in 1972, his overall record was 40–42–1.

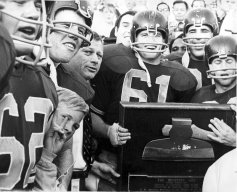
The Big Game, 1967

A positive stand out during the 1960s was Craig Morton. As an All-American he set multiple Cal records, including for most career passing yards and touchdown passes. His touchdown record of 36 lasted for the next 24 years. He was picked 5th in the 1965 draft by the Dallas Cowboys, and was with them for the next ten years, leading them to two Super Bowls.

Mike White was hired in 1972. He was a Cal alumnus and a Stanford assistant coach from 1964 to 1971. In 1972 both Stanford and Cal head coaching positions became open and he received invitations from both schools to lead their programs. He decided to leave Stanford and return to Cal. In 1974, the team went 4–2–1 in the conference. It was led by quarterback Steve Bartkowski, who was a consensus All-American and first in the nation with 2,580 yards. In 1975 he was the number one NFL draft pick for the Atlanta Falcons and was named the NFL Rookie of the Year. In 1975, behind an NCAA-leading offense anchored by All-Americans Joe Roth, Chuck Muncie, Wesley Walker, Steve Rivera, and Ted Albrecht, the Golden Bears were co-champions of the Pac-8. It was co-champion UCLA went to the Rose Bowl because of its season victory over Cal. The quarterback and leader of the 1975 team was Joe Roth, who was one of the Heisman Trophy candidates at the beginning of 1976. That season, Roth had a great start, however halfway through it his performance started to drop. Unknown to everyone but his best friends and coach White, Roth was diagnosed with melanoma the most dangerous form of skin cancer. Despite this, he continued to play, finishing the season as an All-American. Roth's last game was in January 1977 at an all-star game in Japan, he died several weeks later in Berkeley. In respect of his perseverance, and commitment to others, his former locker was dedicated in his honor and the annual home game against UCLA or USC was named the Joe Roth Memorial Game.

Coach Mike White left after a 1977 season when the Bears finished 7–4 but with all of the losses coming in the conference. White was succeeded by Roger Theder, who was one of his assistant coaches during the previous six years. Theder led the Bears to three winning seasons, but each less successful than the previous one. In 1979, California played in the Garden State Bowl, losing to Temple 28–17 after a 6–5 regular season.

=== Joe Kapp era (1982–1986) ===
The 1980s saw a return to mediocrity, with California posting only one winning season in the entire decade - 1982. Even though he had only one winning season, Joe Kapp was the most successful coach during this period. Kapp was a Cal quarterback during the 1950s and was considered to be one of the greatest players in Cal history. He was a gritty quarterback on the runner-up Minnesota Vikings in Super Bowl IV. Even though he did not have any coaching experience, due to his famous determination and commitment to the team, Kapp was hired as the head coach in 1982. Kapp's success as a player did not translate into success as a coach. His first season could be considered his best, with the Bears winning four conference games and reaching the sixth place in the standings. The 1986 season was Kapp's last. It is remembered for his team's upset of Stanford in the 1986 Big Game. Stanford was 7-2 and ranked 16th in the nation. Despite this, Kapp's defense dominated the game - Stanford's quarterback John Paye was sacked seven times, while its running game was held to 41 yards. Cal won the game 17–11. Ultimately, Joe Kapp is most known for the Play, which happened during the 1982 Big Game. Led by quarterback John Elway, Stanford made a field goal with four seconds left in the game, leading Cal by one point. In the ensuing kickoff return, Cal used five lateral passes to score a touchdown and turn certain defeat into a 25–20 victory, running into Stanford's marching band's celebration. Due to the Big Game rivalry and the almost impossible way that it unfolded, The Play is considered to be one of the most memorable plays in college football history.

=== Bruce Snyder era (1987–1991) ===
Bruce Snyder, an assistant coach of the Los Angeles Rams, arrived as head coach at Berkeley in 1987. In 1990 Cal won seven games, Finishing Pac-10 in 4th place, which was its highest since 1977. California played in the Copper Bowl where it beat Wyoming 17–15. This was the first bowl win since the 1938 Rose Bowl. The 1991 team went 10–2, reaching the 2nd place in the Pac-12. Part of Snyder's success was due to him being able to recruit a number of outstanding players, such as Russell White, Mike Pawlawski, Sean Dawkins, Troy Auzenne, David Ortega, away from football powers such as USC and UCLA. One of the unfortunate highlights of that season was against future national co-champion the undefeated Washington Huskies. The game was at home, where California was able to stand up to Huskies unlike any other team that season. The team stopped Washington from scoring within the Cal red zone on multiple occasions, but lost the game on an incomplete pass with 5 seconds left in the game. Cal lost that game 17 to 24. The teams other unfortunate loss was to Stanford - 21–38. The Bears finished the season ranked No. 8, defeating No. 11 Clemson Tigers in the Florida Citrus Bowl - 37–13.

=== Keith Gilbertson era (1992–1995) ===
Because of negotiation problems with Cal's new athletic director, Snyder left Cal for the Arizona State Sun Devils right after the Citrus Bowl. Upon leaving Snyder's salary increased from $250,000 a year at Cal to $600,000 at Arizona State. The Bears were able to replace Snyder by hiring away the Washington Huskies offensive coordinator Keith Gilbertson. During his four years Cal had only one winning season. In 1993 it went 4–4 in the Pac-10 and placed 5th in the conference. Cal was invited to the Alamo Bowl where they defeated the 8th place Big Ten team, the Iowa Hawkeyes 37 to 3. 1994 was the first year of the future Cal and NFL legend Tony Gonzales, who played both as a tight end and forward for the Golden Bears basketball team.

=== Steve Mariucci era (1996) ===
In 1996 Cal hired Green Bay Packers assistant coach Steve Mariucci. Under the new coach Cal won its first five games, with the fifth win being against 17th ranked USC in Los Angeles. However, it only won once during the rest of the season and Cal went 6–6 overall and 3–5 in the conference. Because of the 6 overall wins, Cal was invited to the Aloha Bowl, where it lost to Navy 42 to 38. On January 17 Mariucci left Cal to be the head coach at the San Francisco 49ers. (Note: During his first year Mariucci led the 49ers to a 13–3 regular season, however that team lost in the NFC championship game.)

=== Tom Holmoe era (1997–2001) ===
Steve Mariucci's 1997 replacement was the previous season's defensive coordinator Tom Holmoe. During the next 5 years under Holmoe, Cal went 6–34 in the Pac-10. In 1999 Cal went a dismal 3–5 in the Pac-10, however in 2002 those 3 wins were forfeited as was found guilty of major NCAA violations. It emerged that two players were added to an already completed course in order to keep those players eligible for competition. Even though this was discovered in 2002 when Cal had a new head coach, the 2002 team was banned from participating in a post season bowl. 2001 was Holmoe's last year, the team went 1–10, with its only win coming from the last game of the year versus Rutgers, a team that went 0–7 in the Big East conference. That pre-season game was rescheduled to the end of the season due to the September 11, 2001 terrorist attacks. During Holmoe's years California lost all of its four games to the archrival Stanford.

=== Jeff Tedford era (2002–2012) ===
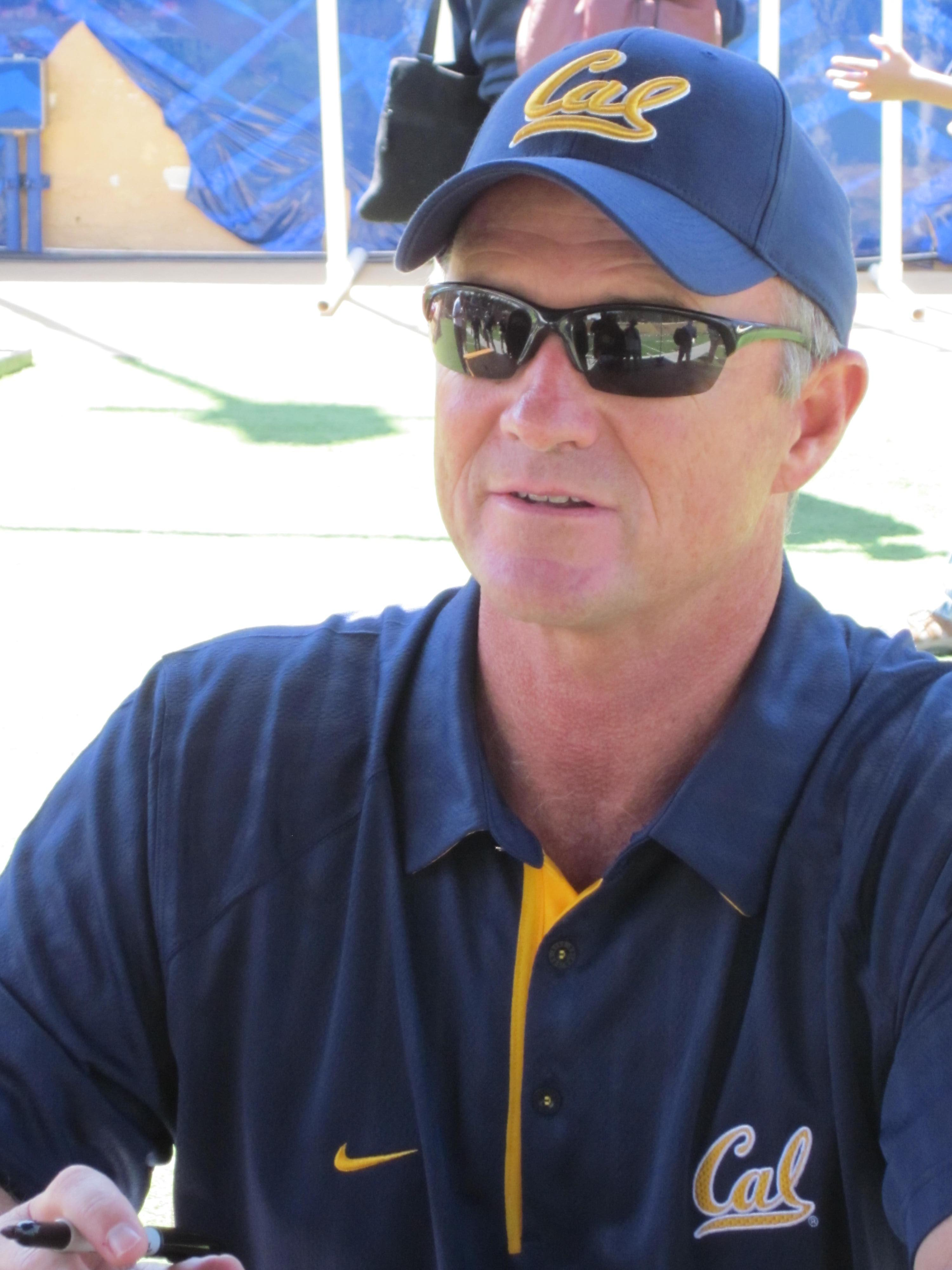
Jeff Tedford, 2010

During the last month of 2001 Holmoe was replaced by Jeff Tedford, previously a successful offensive coordinator for the Oregon Ducks. California began a renaissance under Tedford, who dramatically turned around the long-suffering program. Under him the Golden Bears posted eight consecutive winning seasons, a feat that had not been accomplished since the days of Pappy Waldorf. After being ruled ineligible for a bowl game in 2002 due to academic infractions under Holmoe, the Bears went on to appear in seven straight bowl games. Cal finished Tedford's first season going 7–5, their first winning season since 1993. The 2002 team defeated three nationally ranked opponents on the road for the first time in school history, including California's first win over conference foe Washington in 26 years, and won the annual Big Game against arch-rival Stanford for the first time in eight years. The 2003 team was led by a junior college transfer, and future NFL superstar Aaron Rodgers. The Golden Bears posted an 8–6 record, highlighted by a dramatic 34–31 triple-overtime victory over No. 3 ranked and eventual national co-champion USC. Bears were invited to the 2003 Insight Bowl, where they edged Virginia Tech 52–49. During that season Rodgers tied Cal's season record with five 300-yard games and set a Cal record for the lowest percentage of passes intercepted at 1.43%.

In 2004, the Bears posted a 10–1 regular season with their only loss coming against the eventual national champion - USC, and finished the regular season ranked No. 4 in the nation. Running back J.J. Arrington set a Cal record gaining 2,018 total rushing yards, becoming only the third Pac-10 running to gain over 2,000 yards. Based on Cal's record the team was expected to receive an at-large BCS bowl berth, and play in the Rose Bowl for the first time since 1958. However, Mac Brown the coach of then lower ranked University of Texas, intensively lobbied both Coaches Poll and the Associated Press voters to change their ranking in the final week of the season. Even though Texas did not play and Cal won its final game, it was Texas that received more votes in the final poll and was invited to play in the Rose Bowl. The Longhorns went on to beat Michigan, while California was upset by lower ranked Texas Tech in the Holiday Bowl. Partially due to the lobbying controversy with California's BCS ranking, the AP poll withdrew from the BCS after that season. After the season, Rodgers decided to forgo his senior season to enter the 2005 NFL draft. He was drafted in the first round by the Green Bay Packers, while senior J.J. Arrington was drafted in the second round by Arizona Cardinals.

The 2005 season saw inconsistent quarterback play and an overall inexperienced roster Cal finished the season in the middle of the conference. It went on to defeat BYU in the Las Vegas Bowl. In 2006, the team went on 10–3 overall and 7–2 in Pac-10, sharing the conference title with USC. This was Cal's first Pac-10 championship since 1975. The star of that year's team was running back Marshawn Lynch, who ran for 1,356 yards and 11 touchdowns, while catching for 328 yards with 4 touchdowns. The Golden Bears accepted an invitation to the 2006 Holiday Bowl, routing Texas A&M 45–10. Lynch left for the NFL as a junior, he was drafted in the first round by the Buffalo Bills. He went on to have an 11-year NFL career as a star running back. Next season Cal had a great start, ranking as high as No. 2 in the AP, but had a terrible second half of the season, finishing ending up in 7th place in the conference. Cal also lost its first Big Game in six seasons. Tedford declared there would be open competition for all positions on the team and a reevaluation of every aspect of California's football program. The team played better in the next two season, but could not get above 4th place in the conference.

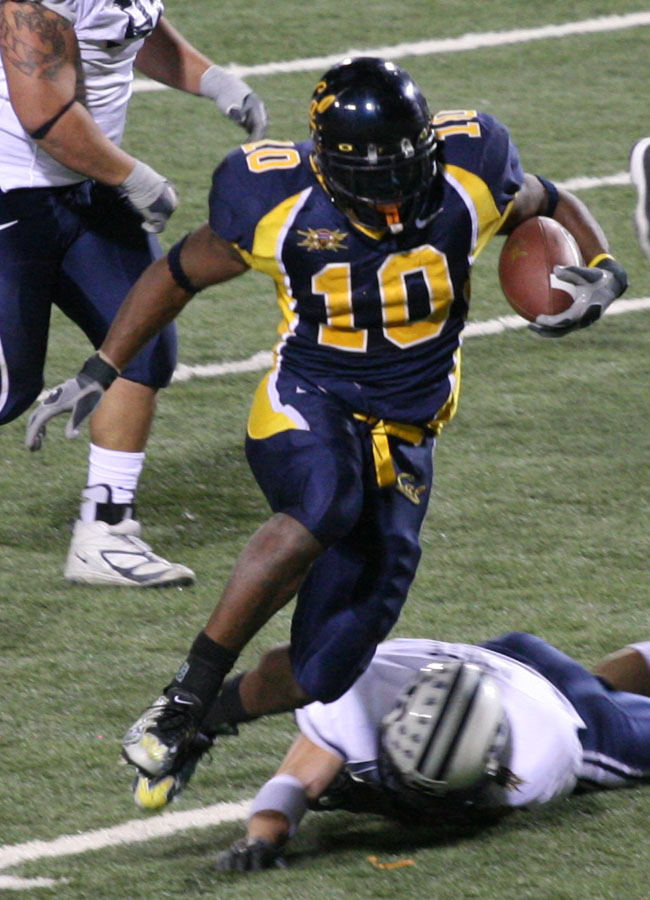
Marshawn Lynch at the 2005 Las Vegas Bowl.

From 2010 to 2012, Cal had three consecutive losing seasons within the Pac-12. California played their 2011 home games in San Francisco Giant's AT&T Park due to the massive reconstruction of the Memorial Stadium. Even though it went 4–5 in the Pac-12, it had an overall winning record and were invited to the 2011 Holiday Bowl where they faced Mack Brown and his Texas Longhorns. Like in the 2004 Rose Bowl controversy, it was Brown that emerged as the winner - Texas beat Cal 21–10. (Note: Eventually the Bears did get some revenge, in 2015 and 2016, under their next coach Sonny Dykes, Cal was able to beat Texas under their next coach Charlie Strong. Both wins were barnburners - 50-43 and 45-44.) Memorial Stadium reopened in 2012 after its $321 million renovation, but Cal had another losing season, winning only two games at home. In addition it lost to Stanford for the third straight time. A few days after the final game, Tedford was fired. Aside from his record, another great concern was that at only 48% of players graduated, with the team having the lowest graduation rate in the Pac-12. Tedford left the Bears with the most bowl wins - 5, conference wins - 50, and games coached - 139, in school's history. He also tied Pappy Waldorf for most Big Game wins - 7. During his tenure, California produced 40 players drafted by the NFL, including eight first-round picks.

=== Sonny Dykes era (2013–2016) ===
At the end 2012, Sonny Dykes was announced as the new head coach. Previously, Dykes was the head coach at Louisiana Tech, where in his final year led the team to a conference championship for the first time in ten years. Dykes was expected to bring significant offensive improvements with his up-tempo, pass-oriented offense known as the Air Raid. However, his first year at Cal will be most remembered for the team's defensive failure. He became the first head of coach in Golden Bear history that could not defeat a single Division I NCAA opponent. Similarly, Bears lost to Stanford by 50 points, the largest margin ever in the 119-year history of the Big Game.

Along with the new coaching staff, the athletic department began implementing a new program to deal with the significant problems of academic performance of Cal's revenue sports athletes. By 2018, all sports programmes would be required to have at least 80 percent incoming athletes comply with University of California system's general admission standard - a high school GPA of at least 3.0. Excepting Stanford, this would be the strictest requirement in the Pac-12. In regards to football, Cal's hopes never came to fruition - over his four years at Cal, Dykes had only one winning season - 2015, and was able to beat one of its traditional rivals – UCLA only once. Dykes was fired as Cal head coach on January 8, 2017. The college career of future NFL star - quarterback Jared Goff, can be considered as one of the few positive highlights of the Dykes era. In his three years under Dykes' Air Raid, he set 26 team records that included, season and career: touchdowns, yardage gained and lowest percentage of interceptions.

=== Justin Wilcox era (2017–present) ===
On January 14, 2017, less than one week after Sonny Dykes' firing, Justin Wilcox was named as his replacement. Wilcox had a successful season as a defensive coordinator for the University of Wisconsin, with the Badgers winning the Cotton Bowl. He had also previous Cal experience as an assistant coach under Jeff Tedford. That season's highlight was the Bears' 37–3 defeat of No. 8 ranked Washington State, the first time Cal beat a top ten opponent since its defeat of No. 3 USC in 2003. In 2018, the Bears went 7–6, with Bears losing 10–7 in overtime to TCU in the 2018 Cheez-It Bowl. That game's loss, along with an earlier upset 12–10 upset against #15 Washington, illustrated both Wilcox's primary reliance on defense and a significant problems with his team's offensive performance. Wilcox's defense was ranked No. 15 in the nation in total yards allowed, while the team's offensive efficiency was the second worst among all Power Five teams. Two standouts of that year's team were junior Evan Weaver who had 155 tackles and two interceptions, and first team All Pac-12 senior Jordan Kunaszyk who had 143 tackles with six forced fumbles. The Bears improved in 2019 to an 8–5 record that included a win at the 2019 Redbox Bowl. They achieved their highest ranking since 2009 when they were ranked No. 15 after a 4–0 start to the season and notably defeated Stanford in the Big Game for the first time since 2009. Senior linebacker Evan Weaver was the standout player of the season after leading the nation with a school-record and Pac-12 record 182 tackles, earning him the Pac-12 Defensive Player of the Year and becoming the first consensus All-American from Cal since 2006.

== Championships ==
=== National championships ===
California has won five (1920, 1921, 1922, 1923, 1937) national championships from NCAA-designated major selectors. California claims all five of these national championships.

Year	Coach	Selector	Record	Bowl	Opponent	Result
1920	Andy Smith	Football Research, Helms, Houlgate, National Championship Foundation, Sagarin, Sagarin (ELO-Chess)	9–0	Rose Bowl	Ohio State	W 28–0
1921	Andy Smith	Billingsley MOV, Boand, Football Research, Sagarin, Sagarin (ELO-Chess)	9–0–1	Rose Bowl	Washington & Jefferson	T 0–0
1922	Andy Smith	Billingsley MOV, Houlgate, NCF, Sagarin	9–0	–		
1923	Andy Smith	Houlgate	9–0–1	–		
1937	Stub Allison	Dunkel, Helms	10–0–1	Rose Bowl	Alabama	W 13–0

=== Conference championships ===
California has won a total of 14 conference championships since 1916.

Year	Conference	Coach	Conference record	Overall record
1918	PCC	Andy Smith	2–0	7–2
1920	PCC	Andy Smith	3–0	9–0
1921	PCC	Andy Smith	4–0	9–0–1
1922	PCC	Andy Smith	4–0	9–0
1923	PCC	Andy Smith	5–0	9–0–1
1935 ^{†}	PCC	Stub Allison	4–1	9–1
1937	PCC	Stub Allison	6–0–1	10–0–1
1938 ^{†}	PCC	Stub Allison	6–1	10–1
1948 ^{†}	PCC	Pappy Waldorf	6–0	10–1
1949	PCC	Pappy Waldorf	7–0	10–1
1950	PCC	Pappy Waldorf	5–0–1	9–1–1
1958	PCC	Pete Elliott	6–1	7–4
1975 ^{†}	Pac-8	Mike White	6–1	8–3
2006 ^{†}	Pac-10	Jeff Tedford	7–2	10–3

† Co-champions

== Head coaches ==
No.	Coach	Tenure	Seasons	Wins	Losses	Ties	Pct.	Bowls
1	Oscar S. Howard	1886	1	6	2	1	.722	0
1.5	No coach	1887–1892	5	18	4	0	.818	0
2	Lee McClung	1892	1	2	1	1	.625	0
3	Pudge Heffelfinger	1893	1	5	1	1	.786	0
4	Charles O. Gill	1894	1	0	1	2	.333	0
5	Frank Butterworth	1895–1896	2	9	3	3	.700	0
6	Charles P. Nott	1897	1	0	3	2	.200	0
7	Garrett Cochran	1898–1899	2	15	1	3	.868	0
8	Addison Kelly	1900	1	4	2	1	.643	0
9	Frank W. Simpson	1901	1	9	0	1	.950	0
10	James Whipple	1902–1903	2	14	1	2	.882	0
11	James Hopper	1904	1	6	1	1	.813	0
12	J. W. Knibbs	1905	1	4	1	2	.714	0
14*	James Schaeffer	1915	1	8	5	0	.615	0
15	Andy Smith	1916–1925	10	74	16	7	.799	2
16	Nibs Price	1926–1930	5	27	17	3	.606	1
17	Bill Ingram	1931–1934	4	27	14	4	.644	0
18	Stub Allison	1935–1944	10	58	42	2	.578	1
19	Buck Shaw	1945	1	4	5	1	.450	0
20	Frank Wickhorst	1946	1	2	7	0	.222	0
21	Pappy Waldorf	1947–1956	10	67	32	4	.650	3
22	Pete Elliott	1957–1959	3	10	21	0	.323	1
23	Marv Levy	1960–1963	4	8	29	3	.238	0
24	Ray Willsey	1964–1971	8	40	42	1	.488	0
25	Mike White	1972–1977	6	35	30	1	.538	0
26	Roger Theder	1978–1981	4	18	27	0	.400	1
27	Joe Kapp	1982–1986	5	20	34	1	.373	0
28	Bruce Snyder	1987–1991	5	29	24	4	.544	2
29	Keith Gilbertson	1992–1995	4	20	26	0	.435	1
30	Steve Mariucci	1996	1	6	6	0	.500	1
31	Tom Holmoe	1997–2001	5	12	43	0	.218	0
32	Jeff Tedford	2002–2012	11	82	57	0	.590	8
33	Sonny Dykes	2013–2016	4	19	30	0	.388	1
34	Justin Wilcox	2017–present	3	20	18	0	.526	2
	Totals	1886–present	125	678	546	51	.564	24

* From 1906 to 1914, rugby was played instead of football. Cal's 13th coach was Oscar Taylor from 1906 to 1908. Cal's 14th coach, James Schaeffer, coached rugby from 1909 to 1914 and football in 1915.
