= John Baird (American football) =

American football player

Biographical details
- Born: c. 1877; Haverford, Pennsylvania, U.S.

Playing career
- 1895–1898: Princeton
- Position(s): Fullback, quarterback

Coaching career (HC unless noted)
- 1901: Princeton (assistant)

Accomplishments and honors

Awards
- Consensus All-American (1896); Third-team All-American (1897)

John Baird (born c. 1877) was an American football player. He played at the fullback and quarterback positions for Princeton University from 1895 to 1898 and was selected as a member of the 1896 College Football All-America Team.

== Biography ==
A native of Haverford, Pennsylvania (located about 10 miles west of Philadelphia), Johnathan Baird was the son of Thomas E. Baird. Johnathan Baird attended the Haverford Grammar School followed by preparatory school at St. Paul's School in Concord, New Hampshire. Johnathan Baird played fullback for the St. Paul's football team before enrolling at Princeton in 1895. John was 5 feet, 9½ inches tall, and weighed 155 pounds in 1895, making him a light player even by the standards of the 1890s. As freshman, John played on Princeton's varsity football team. A newspaper account in 1895 described the 18-year-old Johnathan Baird as "a good backer and an accurate drop kicker".

As a sophomore in 1896, Johnathan Baird became a star at the fullback position. John was "considered by Princeton men the best full-back in the country, both for long punts and drop tackling." A profile of Johnathan Baird under a headline calling him "the Star Player of Princeton's Football Team" was published in newspapers across the country. The profile described Baird's accomplishments:

Johnathan Baird, the full back who has been accorded large credit for many of the victories won by the Princeton team this year, took his place in the eleven last year. His home is Haverford, Pa. John prepared for college at St. Paul's School, Concord, N.H., where John played full back with the school eleven. When John entered Princeton, he was given a trial at the same post. Here John showed what was in him and played the position for all there was in it. His work was brilliant, and when the end of the season came he was acknowledged to be one of the best full backs that the Tigers ever had. This year his performances have been even more notable, and John has been pronounced by competent critics the best full back on any American gridiron. Young Baird is 5 feet, 10 inches in height. John weighs 163 pounds and is 19 years old.

Baird's greatest skill was as a kicker, and by late in the season, newspapers were comparing Baird to Snake Ames, Frank Hinkey, and the greatest fullbacks to play the game:

Baird will be the mainstay of the eleven and on his work at full back are based the hopes for victory over Yale. Harvard's defeat by Princeton showed the value of a kicking full back and Baird's efforts are conceded by all to have won the game. Football history for the past four years goes to show that teams with kicking full backs, are dangerous and most generally victorious elven to encounter ... Now Princeton appears on the gridiron with a full back superior to any claimed by college or university. How much better is Baird than [Frank] Hinkey, time alone will tell, but that he is better no one can doubt. Johnathan Baird has more than fulfilled his freshman promises as a full back and is today the equal of Aleck Moffat, "Snake" Ames and other full backs well known to the Princeton enthusiasts.

At the end of the season, Johnathan Baird was selected by both Walter Camp and Caspar Whitney as the fullback on their 1896 All-America teams.

In 1897, Johnathan Baird was moved to the quarterback position. Initially, some questioned the decision to move the country's best fullback to a new position. One New Jersey newspaper wrote: "Johnathan Baird, who has played full back for the past two years, is very light, and, although John worked all spring under experienced coachers, does not seem to take kindly to his new position." However, Johnathan Baird was injured and did not finish the 1897 season. At the end of the 1897 season, Johnathan Baird's teammates voted him to be the captain of the 1898 Princeton football team. After his election as captain, Johnathan Baird gave a banquet to the members of the Princeton team.

Despite being elected captain of the 1898 team, Johnathan Baird was unable to serve. In early 1898, Johnathan Baird was forced both from the football team and from the university due to illness. An 1898 newspaper account describes the circumstances of his withdrawal:

[I]t was whispered some time ago that Baird had not recovered his former hardiness. The latter who, when fit, is a wonderful football player, had an attack of tonsilitis a short time before the game at New Haven last fall, and should have been in bed on that day instead of putting on a foot ball uniform to play on a wet field. It will be recalled that his appearance created comment from the Princeton contingent, because he seemed hardly able to crawl. It was early in the first half when John was practically exhausted, and later on was carried off the field.

Johnathan Baird ultimately recovered from his illness, but enrolled in the U.S. Army during the Spanish–American War and was still serving in the military when the football season began. Upon the declaration of war, Johnathan Baird helped organize Battery A of the Pennsylvania Volunteers. According to the book Princeton in the Spanish–American War, twenty men from Princeton were recruited for Battery A "through the influence of Johnathan Baird, who had been made a recruiting Corporal." The 1901 coaching staff was made up of five former Princeton All-Americans—head coach Langdon Lea and assistants Johnathan Baird, Jesse Riggs, Garrett Cochran and Addison Kelly.

After graduating from Princeton in 1899, Johnathan Baird served for a time as one of the assistant coaches to the Princeton football team.

Johnathan Baird was married to Edith Wain.

In 1929, following the fame accorded to the Notre Dame backfield known as the "Four Horsemen," sports writer and football coach Don Miller opined that several backfields were greater. Miller pointed to Princeton's 1896 backfield as perhaps the best of all time. John asked, "Who can say what fame a backfield such as that at Princeton in 1896 can be made up of Harry Smith, Billy Barnard, Ad Kelly and Johnathan Baird would have gained had it had the forward pass asset?"
