= 1896 college football rankings =

- Season: 1896
- Bowl season: 1896–97 bowl games
- End of season champions: Princeton

The 1896 college football season rankings included rankings by several newspapers in the Eastern United States, seven of which are shown below. It is unknown how many newspapers published rankings. Most newspapers only considered the four biggest programs, called by some the Big Four, at the time: Harvard, Pennsylvania, Princeton and Yale.

== The Sun ==
In November 1896, New York City newspaper The Sun published a ranking of the "twelve colleges supposed to have the strongest array of players".

Rank	Team	Record
1	Princeton	10–0–1
2	Penn	14–1
3	Yale	13–1
4	Harvard	7–4
5	Lafayette	11–0–1
6	Brown	4–5–1
7	Carlisle	5–5
8	Cornell	5–3–1
9	Wesleyan	4–5–1
10	Lehigh	2–5
11	Williams	6–4–1
12	Amherst	3–6–1

== New-York Tribune ==
The New-York Tribune published a recap of the 1896 college football season on November 29, 1896, and ranked what it called the four big teams.

Rank	Team	Record
1	Princeton	10–0–1
2	Pennsylvania	14–1
3	Harvard	7–4
4	Yale	13–1

== New York World ==
The New York World published a recap of the 1896 college football season on November 29, 1896, and ranked what it called the "Big Four" teams.

Rank	Team	Record
1	Princeton	10–0–1
2	Pennsylvania	14–1
3т	Harvard	7–4
3т	Yale	13–1

== The Boston Post ==
The Boston Post published a recap of the 1896 college football season on November 29, 1896, and ranked the top three teams.

Rank	Team	Record
1	Princeton	10–0–1
2	Pennsylvania	14–1
3	Harvard	7–4

== The Boston Globe ==
The Boston Globe published a comprehensive recap of the 1896 college football season on November 29, 1896, and ranked the top four teams, while mentioning that Dartmouth had "won the championship of her league without being scored on." Dartmouth shut out both of its opponents in the Triangular Football League in 1896. The Globe also selected an All-America team.

Rank	Team	Record
1	Princeton	10–0–1
2	Pennsylvania	14–1
3	Harvard	7–4
4	Yale	13–1

== The Philadelphia Inquirer ==
The Philadelphia Inquirer published a comprehensive recap of the 1896 college football season on November 29, 1896, and ranked the top four teams. The author was critical of Princeton for not adopting player eligibility rules to which Harvard, Pennsylvania and Yale had agreed. Specifically, Harvard, Pennsylvania and Yale did not use freshman players, required all student-athletes to maintain good academic standing, and did not allow student-athletes, including those who transferred from other institutions, to compete for more than four years and required student-athletes to pay their own board. The author stated that Princeton's rejection of these rules "detracts from the glory of Princeton's unbeaten career of 1986." The author did admit to having "friendly feelings" for Pennsylvania. The Inquirer also selected an All-America team.

On the same date, another Inquirer journalist ranked the top eight teams in a separate recap of the season. The author mentioned the criticism directed at Princeton and stated:

As a matter of fact, the teams that dwell in castles of immaculate purity, who never raise their little fingers to motion to good players to enter their portals, could be counted on very few fingers of one little hand, and the college that stands on the front doorstep of its glass mansion and hurls epithets and recriminations at her neighbors deserves to have every pane of her house broken.

Like the first Inquirer journalist, who is anonymous, the second author, Burr W. McIntosh, also selected an All-American team.

Anonymous
Rank	Team	Record
1т	Princeton	10–0–1
1т	Pennsylvania	14–1
3	Harvard	7–4
4	Yale	13–1

Burr W. McIntosh
Rank	Team	Record
1	Princeton	10–0–1
2т	Pennsylvania	14–1
2т	Harvard	7–4
4	Lafayette	11–0–1
5	Yale	13–1
6т	Cornell	5–3–1
6т	Brown	4–5–1
8	Carlisle	5–5

== See also ==
- 1896 College Football All-America Team
