= Clarence Fincke =

American football player and banker (1874–1959)

Yale Bulldogs
- Position: Quarterback

Personal information
- Born: October 12, 1874
- Died: June 19, 1959 (aged 84); Englewood, New Jersey, U.S.

Career information
- High school: The Hill School
- College: Yale (1894–1896)

Awards and highlights
- Consensus All-American (1896)

Clarence Mann Fincke (October 12, 1874 – June 19, 1959) was an All-American football player and a banker. He played football for Yale University from 1894 to 1896, mostly at quarterback and some at fullback, and was selected as the quarterback for the 1896 College Football All-America Team.

== Playing career ==
Fincke attended The Hill School before enrolling at Yale University, where he was a member of Skull and Bones. At Yale, Fincke played on the football team from 1894 to 1896. Fincke was 5-feet, 11-inches tall and weighed 160 pounds. He was voted captain of the 1895 football team, and a Massachusetts newspaper that year called Fincke "the steadiest player" on Yale's team. His tackling in an 1895 game against the Carlisle Indian School helped prevent the Carlisle team from scoring on Yale.

Fincke also played third base for the baseball team. One newspaper reported that he was "a good fielder and thrower" but "weak at the bat."

Fincke was popular among the Yale student body. He was voted the handsomest man in his Yale class and the most popular. Upon his graduation in 1897, Fincke was also voted as the member of his class who had done the most for Yale.

== Later-life ==
After graduating from Yale, Fincke served as the football coach at The Hill School. He later went into the banking business and became the president and chairman of the board of Greenwich Savings Bank in New York. He died at Englewood, New Jersey in 1959 at age 84.
