= George B. Walbridge =

American college football player

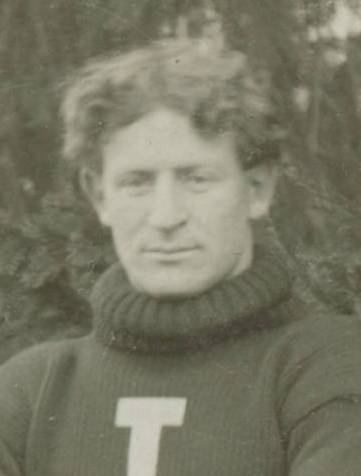
- George B. Walbridge, captain of the national co-champion college football team at Lafayette and an 1897 All-America halfback Lafayette College, David Bishop Skillman Library, Department of Special Collections & College Archives

Profile
- Position: Halfback

Career information
- College: Lafayette College (1896–1897)

Awards and highlights
- National champion (1896); Second-team All-American (1899); Third-team All-American (1897)

George Baines Walbridge (July 6, 1874 – June 30, 1955) was an All-American football player for Lafayette College and a co-founder of Walbridge Aldinger of Detroit, Michigan, one of the 50 largest construction companies in the United States.

== Football career ==
Walbridge was living near Wellsboro, Pennsylvania in what was then known as Stony Fork when he enrolled at Lafayette in 1894. Walbridge was right halfback and captain of Lafayette's 1896 team, which was named the national co-champion of college football 37 years later by the team's coach, Parke H. Davis, who had become the sport's leading historian.

Walbridge was selected by Walter Camp as a third team All-American in 1897.

== Military service and the construction industry ==
With the outbreak of the Spanish–American War in 1898, Walbridge enlisted, serving as a private in the light artillery in Puerto Rico.

Upon returning to civilian life, he graduated from Cornell with a degree in civil engineering in 1900.

Starting out as a draftsman, Walbridge worked his way up. He spent six years with D. Burnham and Company in Chicago before joining Hedden Construction Company of New York City as general superintendent. He resigned that position to become vice president of the George F. Fuller Company of New York City, which transferred him to Detroit in 1914. In 1916, he co-founded Walbridge Aldinger in what was becoming the "motor city". According to the Walbridge company website, his partner

(Albert H.) Aldinger, a German immigrant, was a banker who founded a construction company in Canada shortly before meeting George Walbridge. Both men became widely respected industry leaders who were instrumental in founding the Associated General Contractors of America and the Detroit Chapter.

Walbridge felt the call of service to his country again with America's involvement in World War I, attaining the rank of lieutenant colonel in the Engineers Corp.

With Walbridge serving as vice president and general manager, the company that bore his name became one of the 50 largest construction companies in the United States.

In 1925, he was named national president of the Associated General Contractors of America.

In 1934, Walbridge, a Republican, was named a member of the advisory council to the Federal Housing Administration, created under the administration of President Franklin D. Roosevelt.

Walbridge remained a leader of his company for some 39 years, retiring as Chairman in 1955.

In 2008, the company he helped create changed its name to simply "Walbridge."

== Personal life ==
Walbridge married Helen M. McCauley of Chicago on January 3, 1903. They had four children: Clare, George, Joseph H. and Jane.
