= Allan Doucette =

American football player (1872–1901)

Profile
- Position: Center

Personal information
- Born: September 15, 1872; Charlottetown, Prince Edward Island, Canada
- Died: January 1901 (aged 28); Cambridge, Massachusetts, U.S.

Career information
- College: Harvard

Awards and highlights
- Consensus All-American (1897)

Allan Edward Doucette (September 15, 1872 – January 8, 1901) was an American football player. He played at the center position for Harvard and was a consensus All-American in 1897.

== Early life ==
Doucette was born in 1872 at Charlottetown, Prince Edward Island, Canada. He attended high school in Dover, New Hampshire.

== Harvard ==
Doucette attended Harvard University and received his undergraduate in 1895, earning honorable mention in physics. He spent the next three years at Harvard Law School, graduating in 1898.

He played for the sophomore and senior class teams while an undergraduate. While attending the law school, he played at the center position for the Harvard Crimson football team in 1896 and 1897. In a game against the 1896 Carlisle Indians, he recovered a Carlisle fumble and began running with the ball; when a Carlisle player was abuut to tackle him, Douctte passed the ball to a teammate who scored the only touchdown of the game. He was the consensus choice at center on the 1897 All-America team, receiving first-team honors from Walter Camp, Outing magazine, and the New York Sun. The Boston Globe wrote: "Beside being a tower of strength in the line, he was one of the most heady players that ever wore the colors of Harvard university."

== Later life ==
After leaving Havard, Doucette studied and practiced law at the office of George Fred Williams in Boston. He attended the Harvard-Yale game in late November 1900 while suffering from a heavy cold. His condition worsened after the game, and he died at age 28 at his home in Cambridge, Massachusetts, from typhoid fever on January 8, 1901. He was buried in Cambridge Cemetery.
