= 1897 All-America college football team =

List created by Harper's Weekly

The 1897 All-America college football team is composed of college football players who were selected as All-Americans for the 1897 college football season, as selected by Walter Camp for Harper's Weekly. Caspar Whitney had selected the Harper's Weekly All-American Team from 1891 to 1896, but Whitney was on a world's sports tour during the 1897 season, and Camp therefore substituted for Whitney.

== All-American selections for 1897 ==
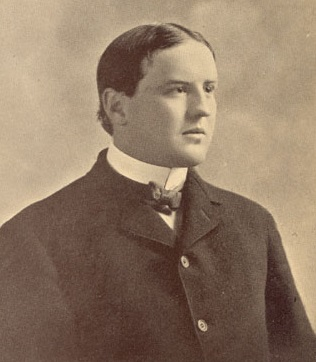
Garrett Cochran of Princeton.

=== Key ===
- WC = Walter Camp for Harper's Weekly
- OUT = Outing Magazine
- NYS = New York Sun
- LES = Leslie's Weekly by W. T. Bull
- **Bold** = Consensus All-American

=== Ends ===
- **Garrett Cochran**, Princeton (WC-1; OUT-1; NYS-1; LES-1)
- **John A. Hall**, Yale (WC-1; OUT-2; NYS-2; LES-2)
- Sam Boyle, Penn (WC-2; OUT-1; LES-1)
- William McKeever, Cornell (WC-2)
- John Babcock Moulton, Harvard (WC-3; NYS-1)
- Lyndon S. Tracy, Cornell (WC-3)
- Norman Cabot, Harvard (NYS-2; LES-2)
- Samuel G. Craig, Princeton (NYS-2)
- Josiah J. Hazen, Yale (OUT-2)

=== Tackles ===
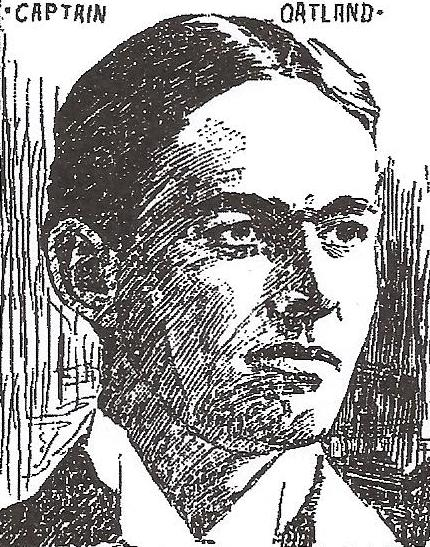
John H. Outland of Penn.

- **Burr Chamberlain**, Yale (WC-1; OUT-1; NYS-1; LES-1)
- **John H. Outland**, Penn (Namesake of the Outland Trophy and College Football Hall of Fame) (WC-1; LES-1)
- James O. Rodgers, Yale (WC-2; OUT-1; NYS-2; LES-2)
- Wallace B. Scales, Army (WC-2; NYS-2)
- Art Hillebrand, Princeton (College Football Hall of Fame) (WC-3; OUT-2; NYS-1)
- Malcolm Donald, Harvard (WC-3)
- S. M. Goodman, Penn (OUT-2)
- Chester Odiorne Swain, Harvard (LES-2)

=== Guards ===
- **Truxtun Hare**, Penn (WC; HW; NYS-1; LES-2)
- **Gordon Brown**, Yale (College Football Hall of Fame) (WC; HW; NYS-2; LES-1)
- Charles Chadwick, Yale (WC-2; OUT-2; LES-1)
- Charles Rinehart, Lafayette (College Football Hall of Fame) (WC-2; OUT-1)
- George Winthrop Bouve, Harvard (WC-3; OUT-1; NYS-1; LES-2)
- Josiah McCracken, Penn (WC-3; OUT-2)
- Edwards, Princeton (NYS-2)

=== Centers ===
- **Allan Doucette**, Harvard (WC-1; OUT-2; NYS-1; LES-2)
- George Cadwalader, Yale (WC-2; OUT-1; LES-1)
- Pete Overfield, Penn (WC-3)

=== Quarterbacks ===
- **Charles de Saulles**, Yale (WC-1; NYS-1; LES-1)
- George Young, Cornell (WC-2; OUT-1)
- John Baird, Princeton (WC-3; OUT-2; NYS-1 [as fb]; LES-2)
- Leon Kromer, Army (NYS-2)
- David Weeks, Penn (NYS-2)

=== Halfbacks ===
- **Benjamin Dibblee**, Harvard (WC-1; OUT-1; NYS-1; LES-2)
- **Addison Kelly**, Princeton (WC-1; OUT-1; NYS-2; LES-2)
- Dave Fultz, Brown (WC-2; OUT-2; NYS-1; LES-1)
- William F. Nesbitt, Army (WC-2)
- W. H. Bannard, Princeton (WC-3; NYS-2)
- George B. Walbridge, Lafayette (WC-3)
- Charles T. Dudley, Yale (OUT-2; NYS-2)

=== Fullbacks ===
- **John Minds**, Penn (College Football Hall of Fame) (WC-1; OUT-1; NYS-2; LES-1)
- Malcolm McBride, Yale (WC-2; NYS-2; LES-2)
- Powell Wheeler, Princeton (WC-3; LES-1)
- Edward G. Bray, Lafayette (OUT-2)
