= 1886 California Golden Bears football team =

American college football season

1886 California Golden Bears football
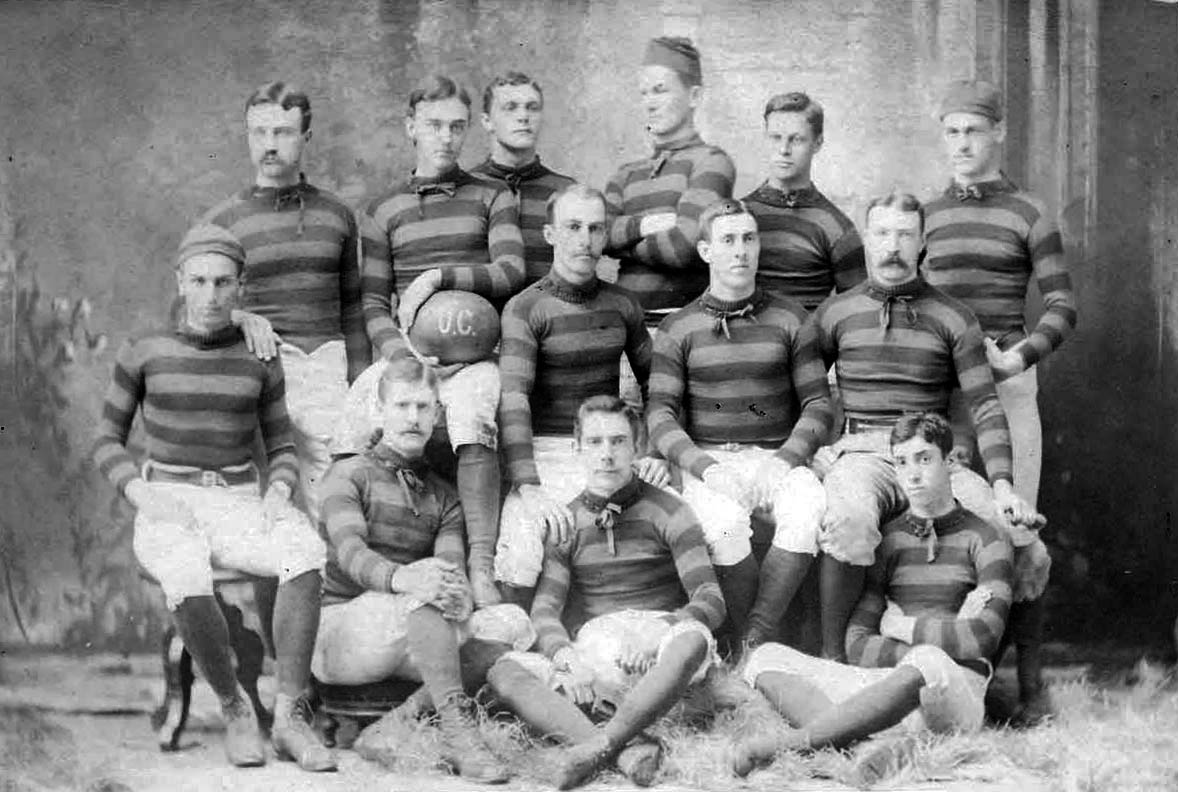
- Conference: Independent
- Record: 6–2–1
- Head coach: Oscar S. Howard (1st season)
- Captain: Frederick C. Turner

1886 Western college football independents records
	Conf.			Overall
Team	W	L	T	W		L		T
California		–		6	–	2	–	1
Colorado College		–		1	–	0	–	0

The 1886 California Golden Bears football team was an American football team that represented the University of California, Berkeley during the 1886 college football season. The team competed as an independent under head coach Oscar S. Howard and compiled a record of 6–2–1.

== Schedule ==
Date	Opponent	Site	Result	Attendance	Source
January 16	Wasps	University Grounds; Berkeley, CA	W 20–2		
February 22	Hastings Law College	University Grounds; Berkeley, CA	W 1–0		
February 27	at Orions	Oakland Baseball Park; Oakland, CA	L 10–12	> 1,000	
March 13	at Reliance Athletic Club	Oakland Baseball Park; Oakland, CA	T 12–12		
March 27	Reliance Athletic Club	Berkeley, CA	W 10–0		
April 30	Orions	Berkeley, CA	W 29–2		
May 5	Reliance Athletic Club	Berkeley, CA	L 4–7		
May 21	Wasps	Berkeley, CA	W 1–0		
May 22	Hastings Law College	Berkeley, CA	W 1–0		
