= 1896 All-America college football team =

List of the best college football players of 1896

The 1896 All-America college football team is composed of college football players who were selected as All-Americans for the 1896 college football season, as selected by Caspar Whitney for Harper's Weekly and the Walter Camp Football Foundation.

== All-American selections for 1896 ==
=== Key ===
- WC = Walter Camp Football Foundation
- CW = Caspar Whitney, published in Harper's Weekly magazine.
- PI = Philadelphia Inquirer
- NYW = The World of New York selected by Harry Beecher
- LES = Leslie's Weekly by W. T. Bull
- **Bold** = Consensus All-American

=== Ends ===
- **Norman Cabot**, Harvard (WC-1; PI-1; NYW-1; LES-1)
- **Charles Gelbert**, Penn (College Football Hall of Fame) (WC-1; PI-1; LES-1 [back])
- Garrett Cochran, Princeton (NYW-1; LES-2)
- Lyman M. Bass, Yale (LES-1)
- Louis Hinkey, Yale (LES-2)

=== Tackles ===
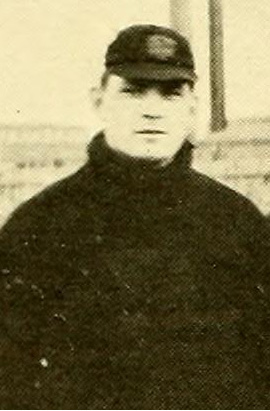
William W. Church of Princeton

- **William W. Church**, Princeton (WC-1; PI-1; NYW-1; LES-1)
- **Fred T. Murphy**, Yale (WC-1; NYW-1; LES-1)
- Percy Haughton, Harvard (College Football Hall of Fame) (PI-1; LES-2)
- James O. Rodgers, Yale (LES-2)

=== Guards ===
- **Charles Wharton**, Penn (College Football Hall of Fame) (WC-1; PI-1)
- **Wylie G. Woodruff**, Penn (WC-1; PI-1; NYW-1; LES-1)
- Shaw, Harvard (LES-2; NYW-1)
- Edward Crowdis, Princeton (LES-1)
- L. J. Uffenheimer, Penn (LES-2)

=== Centers ===
- **Robert Gailey**, Princeton (WC-1; PI-1; NYW-1; LES-2)
- Burr Chamberlain, Yale (LES-1)

=== Quarterbacks ===
- **Clarence Fincke**, Yale (WC-1; PI-1; NYW-1; LES-1)
- F. L. Smith, Princeton (LES-2)

=== Halfbacks ===
- **Edgar Wrightington**, Harvard (WC-1; PI-1; NYW-1)
- **Addison Kelly**, Princeton (WC-1; PI-1; NYW-1; LES-2)
- John William Dunlop, Harvard (LES-1)
- William Bannard, Princeton (LES-2)

=== Fullbacks ===
- **John Baird**, Princeton (WC-1; NYW-1; LES-1)
- John Minds, Penn (College Football Hall of Fame) (PI-1)
- Edward Newcomb Wrightington, Harvard (LES-2)
