= Jimmie Schaeffer =

James Schaeffer
Biographical details
- Born: February 1, 1885; Youngstown, Ohio, U.S.
- Died: August 8, 1972 (aged 87); Los Angeles County, California, U.S.

Coaching career (HC unless noted)

Rugby
- 1909–1914: California

Baseball
- 1911–1915: California

Football
- 1915: California

Head coaching record
- Overall: 65–11–8 (rugby); 39–21–2 (baseball); 8–5 (football)

James Garfield Schaeffer (February 1, 1885 – August 8, 1972) was a rugby union, American football and baseball coach. He served as the University of California rugby coach from 1909 to 1914, and football coach in 1915. In total he amassed a 73–16–8 record. From 1909 to 1914, California played rugby instead of American football, switching back to football rugby code, rather than the American code. He also coached the Cal baseball team from 1911 to 1915 and amassed a 39–21–2 record. Schaeffer resigned from both posts in November 1915. The executive committee of the student body denied that his resignation was forced, but there were rumors of "dissatisfaction with his services" after California was routed by Washington, 72–0. Schaeffer was involved in the recruitment process for his permanent replacement as California's football coach, offering the position to then Purdue coach Andy Smith.

Schaeffer was born in Ohio in 1885 and died in California in 1972.

== Head coaching record ==
=== Football ===
Year	Team	Overall	Conference	Standing	Bowl/playoffs
California Golden Bears (Independent) (1915)
1915	California	8–5			
California:		8–5			
Total:		8–5			
