= J. W. Knibbs =

American football player and coach (1880–1953)

Biographical details
- Born: November 8, 1880; Worcester, Massachusetts, U.S.
- Died: July 5, 1953 (aged 72); Mount Vernon, New York, U.S.

Playing career
- 1901–1904: Dartmouth

Coaching career (HC unless noted)
- 1905: California

Head coaching record
- Overall: 4–1–2

John William Knibbs Jr. (November 8, 1880 – July 5, 1953) was an American football player and coach.

Knibbs was born in Massachusetts on November 8, 1880. He attended Dartmouth College from which he graduated in 1905. He played on the Dartmouth football team from 1901 to 1904, and was the team captain in his senior year.

After graduating from Dartmouth, he was hired to serve as the head football coach at the University of California, Berkeley for the 1905 college football season. He led the team to a record of 4–1–2 in his only year as the coach. An account written by a student described Knibbs' coaching style as follows:

"All hopes and fears of our University are now bound up in the coming Stanford-California football game. We are lying very low and keeping very quiet, as the policy of our Eastern coach, Knibbs, of Dartmouth, is most conservative. Most of the practising is secret, and the field is closed to all save the squad except two afternoons of each week. The work his [sic] year has been tackled in a serious, dogged style by all those out; this alone has won much respect for our new coach."

After retiring from football, Knibbs had a lengthy career with the Otis Elevator Company. In 1909, he was employed by Otis at St. Louis, Missouri. At the time of the 1910 United States census, he was living in Denver, Colorado, with his wife, Marion (age 29), and their daughter, Olive (age 1-8/12). He was employed as a manager for an elevator manufacturing company. In 1915, he was employed as an Otis salesman in San Francisco. In 1918, he was a western selling agent for Otis Elevator Company. In a draft registration card completed in September 1918, Knibbs indicated he was living in Winchester, Massachusetts, and working as an elevator salesman for the Otis Elevator Co. in Boston. At the time of the 1920 United States census, he was living in Mount Vernon, New York with his wife, Marion, and their two children, Olive (age 11) and John (age 9). He was employed as a salesman for a contracting business. At the time of the 1930 United States census, he was living in Mount Vernon, New York with his wife, Marion, and their two children, Olive (age 21) and John. W., Jr. (age 17). He was employed as an elevator salesman. He died at a hospital in Mount Vernon on July 5, 1953. His wife, Marion, had predeceased him in 1951. They were buried at Ferncliff Cemetery in Hartsdale, New York.

Knibbs' son, John W. Knibbs III, also played football at Dartmouth.

== Head coaching record ==
Year	Team	Overall	Conference	Standing	Bowl/playoffs
California Golden Bears (Independent) (1905)
1905	California	4–1–2			
California:		4–1–2			
Total:		4–1–2			
