= Stub Allison =

American sports coach (1892–1961)

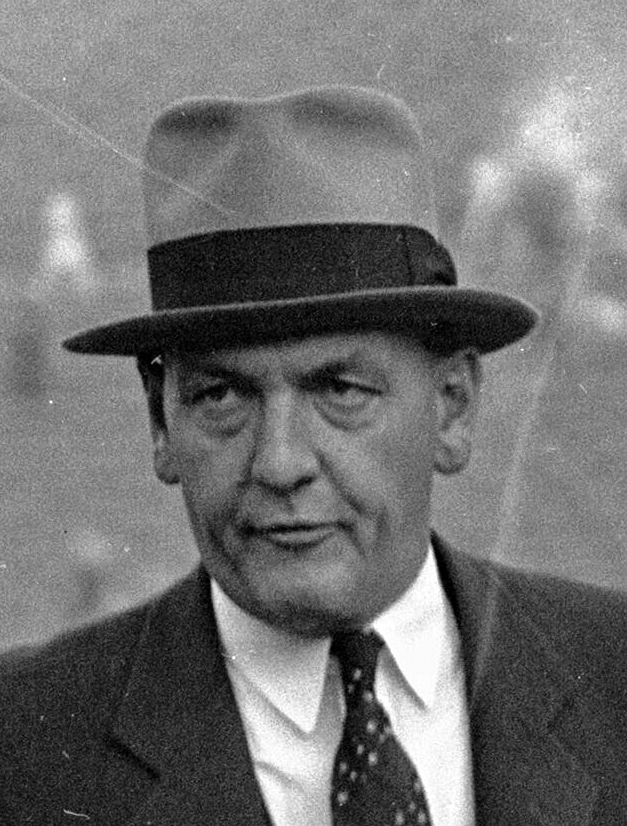
- Allison in 1934

Biographical details
- Born: November 15, 1892; Mazeppa, Minnesota, U.S.
- Died: December 12, 1961 (aged 69); Oakland, California, U.S.

Playing career

Football
- 1916: Carleton
- Position: End

Coaching career (HC unless noted)

Football
- 1919: Washington (assistant)
- 1920: Washington
- 1922–1926: South Dakota
- 1927–1930: Wisconsin (line)
- 1931–1934: California (assistant)
- 1935–1944: California

Basketball
- 1919–1920: Washington

Baseball
- 1920–1921: Washington

Administrative career (AD unless noted)
- 1922–1927: South Dakota
- 1927–1931: Wisconsin (assistant AD)

Head coaching record
- Overall: 80–66–5 (football); 7–8 (basketball); 15–8–1 (baseball)

Accomplishments and honors

Championships
- Football; 1 National (1937); 3 PCC (1935, 1937–1938)

Leonard Blaine "Stub" Allison (November 15, 1892 – December 12, 1961) was an American football, basketball, and baseball coach. He served as the head football coach at the University of Washington (1920), the University of South Dakota (1922–1926), at the University of California, Berkeley (1935–1944), compiling a career college football record of 80–66–5. At California, Allison amassed a 58–42–2 record. In 1937 and 1938, he guided the Bears to back-to-back ten-win seasons, which was at the time the only such occurrence in school history. His 1937 squad, dubbed the "Thunder Team", won the 1938 Rose Bowl, was named the national champions by a number of selectors, and is considered by some sportswriters to have been the best team in school history. While at Washington, Allison also coached the baseball team, in 1920 and 1921, and the basketball team, in 1920.

== Early life ==
Allison was born in Mazeppa, Minnesota and raised in Anoka, Minnesota by Alexander J. & Elizabeth Hauxhurst Allison. He attended Carleton College in Northfield, Minnesota, where he played football. He graduated from Carleton in 1917. He also served for four years in the United States Army.

== Coaching career ==
In its obituary for Allison, The Milwaukee Journal called him a Knute Rockne disciple who mostly relied on the single-wing offense. Allison's first coaching experience came on the staff of his former college coach Claude J. Hunt, at the University of Washington in 1919. The following season, he took over as head coach, and his team amassed a 1–5 record. At Washington, Allison also spent time as the head coach of the baseball and basketball teams. In 1920, he led the basketball team to a 7–8 record, and in 1920 and 1921, he led the baseball team to 7–4–1 and 8–4 records, respectively.

Allison served as head coach at the University of South Dakota from 1922 to 1926 and compiled a 21–19–3 mark. He then moved on to the University of Wisconsin, where he was the head boxing instructor, football line coach, and assistant athletic director from 1927 until 1931. That year, he went to the University of California, Berkeley to take a position as an assistant football coach.

He became the head coach at California for the 1935 season. The ESPN College Football Encyclopedia rates the 1937 California team as the best in school history. Allison led the "Thunder Team" (a play on California's "Wonder Teams" of the 1920s) to the Rose Bowl, where they defeated Alabama, 13–0, to finish with a 10–0–1 record. ESPN noted that team relied on "power runs and a nasty, opportunistic defense that allowed only 33 points and shut out seven teams." Allison's final record at California was 58–42–2. Aside from being named national champions in 1937, under Allison, California captured a share of the Pacific Coast Conference title in 1935 and 1938, and outright in 1937.

In April 1945, after Allison declined the opportunity to resign, California notified him that they would not renew his expiring contract. The Pittsburgh Press noted that after peaking in 1937, "five dismal years were climaxed last fall" in 1944, and that his firing was "no surprise since it was well known that an influential alumni bloc was lobbying against him on grounds that he shackled good material with a dull offense."

== Later life ==
From about 1946 until his death, Allison was the director of industrial relations at the Oakland Naval Supply Center. Allison died on December 12, 1961, in the Alta Bates Hospital in Oakland, California hospital, to which he had been confined for three weeks because of a heart ailment. He was 69 years old and survived by his wife Ethyl.

== Head coaching record ==
=== Football ===
Year	Team	Overall	Conference	Standing	Bowl/playoffs	AP^{#}
Washington Sun Dodgers (Pacific Coast Conference) (1920)
1920	Washington	1–5	0–3	6th		
Washington:		1–5	0–3			
South Dakota Coyotes (North Central Conference) (1922–1926)
1922	South Dakota	3–6–1	0–2–1	T–8th		
1923	South Dakota	4–3–1	1–3–1	7th		
1924	South Dakota	6–2	4–1	2nd		
1925	South Dakota	3–5	1–4	7th		
1926	South Dakota	5–3–1	3–1–1	2nd		
South Dakota:		21–19–3	9–11–3			
California Golden Bears (Pacific Coast Conference) (1935–1944)
1935	California	9–1	4–1	T–1st		
1936	California	6–5	4–3	4th		
1937	California	10–0–1	6–0–1	1st	W Rose	2
1938	California	10–1	6–1	T–1st		14
1939	California	3–7	2–5	8th		
1940	California	4–6	3–4	6th		
1941	California	4–5	3–4	7th		
1942	California	5–5	3–4	7th		
1943	California	4–6	2–2	2nd		
1944	California	3–6–1	1–3–1	4th		
California:		58–42–2	34–27–2			
Total:		80–66–5				
National championship Conference title Conference division title or championship game berth
^{#}Rankings from final AP Poll.
