= Charles P. Nott =

American botanist, botanical collector and football coach (1872–1954)

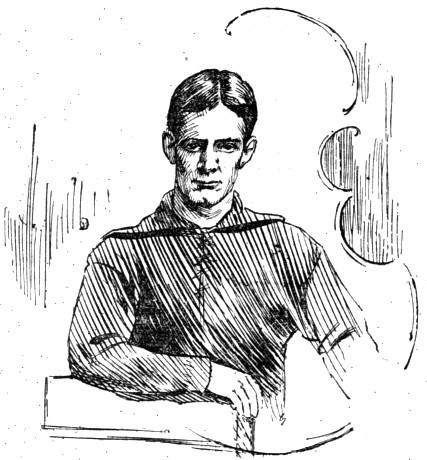
- Nott, circa 1896

Biographical details
- Born: October 25, 1872; Colchester, Vermont, U.S.
- Died: December 30, 1954 (aged 82); Fresno, California, U.S.

Playing career
- 1895: Brown
- Position: Tackle

Coaching career (HC unless noted)
- 1896: California (line)
- 1897: California

Head coaching record
- Overall: 0–3–2

Charles Palmer Nott (October 25, 1872 – December 30, 1954) was an American botanist and college football player and coach. He was the head football coach at the University of California, Berkeley for one season, in 1897, compiling a record of 0–3–2. He was also worked on the faculty at UC Berkeley. Nott played college football at Brown University, where he was the captain of the Brown Bears football team in 1895. Nott came to California in 1896 and served as a line coach under Frank Butterworth for the 1896 California Golden Bears football team.

Nott died in 1954 in Fresno, California.

== Family ==
Nott married fellow academic and botanist Edith Sumner Byxbee.

== Head coaching record ==
Year	Team	Overall	Conference	Standing	Bowl/playoffs
California Golden Bears (Independent) (1897)
1897	California	0–3–2			
California:		0–3–2			
Total:		0–3–2			
