= Oscar S. Howard =

American football coach

Coaching career (HC unless noted)
- 1886: California

Head coaching record
- Overall: 6–2–1

Oscar S. Howard was an American football coach. He was the first head football coach at the University of California, Berkeley, leading the California Golden Bears during a nine-game season played during the winter and spring of 1886. His 1886 team compiled a record of 6–2–1.

== Head coaching record ==
Year	Team	Overall	Conference	Standing	Bowl/playoffs
California Golden Bears (Independent) (1886)
1886	California	6–2–1			
California:		6–2–1			
Total:		6–2–1			
