= James Whipple =

American football player and coach (1873–1914)

Biographical details
- Born: October 19, 1873; Decoto, California, U.S.
- Died: November 7, 1914 (aged 41); Niles, California, U.S.
- Education: University of California, Berkeley (1900)

Playing career
- 1899: California

Coaching career (HC unless noted)
- 1902–1903: California
- 1907: Hillsdale

Head coaching record
- Overall: 18–3–2

James Ray Whipple (October 19, 1873 – November 7, 1914) was an American football player and coach. He served as the head football coach at the University of California, Berkeley from 1902 to 1903 and at Hillsdale College in Hillsdale, Michigan in 1907, compiling a career college football coaching record of 18–3–2.

== Playing career ==
Whipple attended the University of California, Berkeley and graduated in the class of 1900. He also played on the football team, captaining the team in 1899. During that season, Whipple was banned from playing a match held on Thanksgiving Day due to his academic deficiencies. Whipple however defied the order and participated in the match anyway, and was suspended on December 9, 1899 until January of the New Year.

== Coaching career ==
=== California ===
Whipple was the head coach of the California football team from 1902 to 1903.

=== Hillsdale ===
Whipple was the head football coach at Hillsdale College in Hillsdale, Michigan. He held that position for the 1907 season. His coaching record at Hillsdale was 4–2.

== Personal life ==
On May 19, 1898, Whipple married Laura M. Thane. His wife, Laura Thane Whipple was the real estate agent that helped orchestrate the purchase of Moffett Field by the US Navy by 1931.

He later worked in the mining profession in Alaska following his graduation from university. He died on November 7, 1914.

== Head coaching record ==
Year	Team	Overall	Conference	Standing	Bowl/playoffs
California Golden Bears (Independent) (1902–1903)
1902	California	8–0			
1903	California	6–1–2			
California:		14–1–2			
Hillsdale Dales (Michigan Intercollegiate Athletic Association) (1907)
1907	Hillsdale	4–2			
Hillsdale:		4–2			
Total:		18–3–2			
