= Garrett Cochran =

American football player and coach (1876–1918)

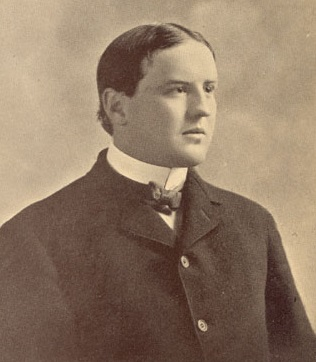

Biographical details
- Born: August 26, 1876; Driftwood, Pennsylvania, U.S.
- Died: July 8, 1918 (aged 41); At sea

Playing career
- 1894–1897: Princeton
- Position: End

Coaching career (HC unless noted)
- 1898–1899: California
- 1900: Navy
- 1902: Princeton

Head coaching record
- Overall: 29–5–3

Accomplishments and honors

Awards
- Consensus All-American (1897); First-team All-American (1896)
- College Football Hall of Fame; Inducted in 1971 (profile)

Garrett Cochran (August 26, 1876 – July 8, 1918) was an American college football player and coach. He played at Princeton University from 1894 to 1897 at the end position, and was twice named to the College Football All-America Team. Cochran served as the head football coach at the University of California, Berkeley from 1898 to 1899, the United States Naval Academy in 1900, and his alma mater, Princeton, in 1902, compiling a career head coaching record of 29–5–3.

During World War I, Cochran enlisted in the United States Army and served in France as a lieutenant in the field artillery. He developed pneumonia and died on a ship returning to the United States on July 8, 1918.

In 1971, Cochran was posthumously inducted into the College Football Hall of Fame.

== Head coaching record ==
Year	Team	Overall	Conference	Standing	Bowl/playoffs
California Golden Bears (Independent) (1898–1899)
1898	California	8–0–2			
1899	California	7–1–1			
California:		15–1–3			
Navy Midshipmen (Independent) (1900)
1900	Navy	6–3			
Navy:		6–3			
Princeton Tigers (Independent) (1902)
1902	Princeton	8–1			
Princeton:		8–1			
Total:		29–5–3			
