= Addison Kelly =

American football and baseball player, football coach, and stockbroker

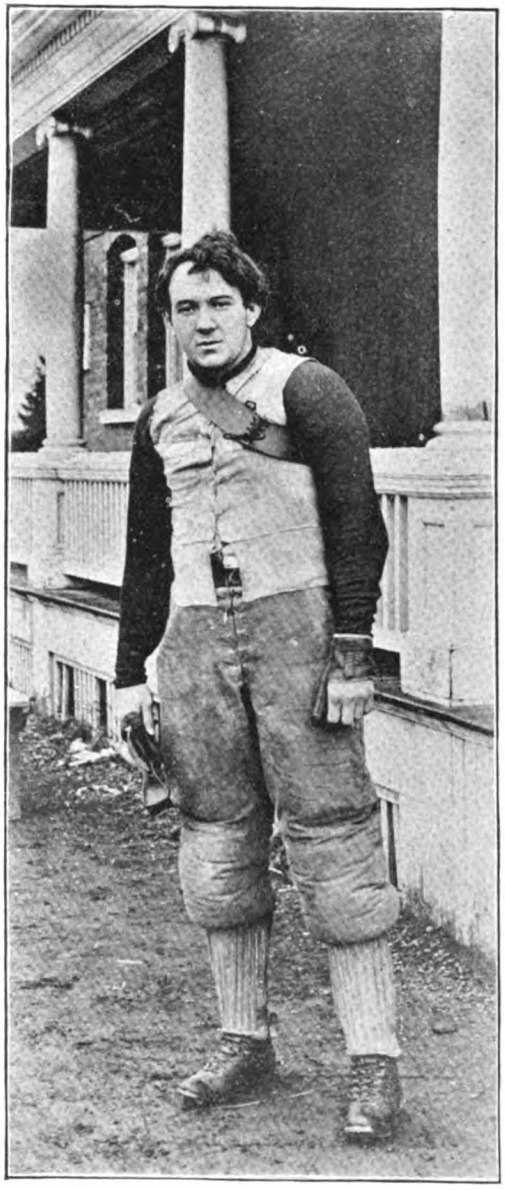
- Kelly in 1896

Biographical details
- Born: c. 1875
- Died: March 23, 1942 (aged 66); New York, New York, U.S.

Playing career

Football
- 1896–1897: Princeton

Baseball
- 1890s: Princeton
- Positions: Halfback (football); First baseman (baseball)

Coaching career (HC unless noted)

Football
- 1900: California

Head coaching record
- Overall: 4–2–1

Accomplishments and honors

Awards
- 2× consensus All-American (1896, 1897)

Addison Wylie "King" Kelly (c. 1875 – March 23, 1942) was an American football and baseball player, coach of football, and stockbroker. He played college football and college baseball at Princeton University, from which he graduated in 1898. In 1896 and 1897, Addison was selected as a halfback on the College Football All-America Team. He also played for four seasons as a first baseman on Princeton's baseball team. In 1900, Kelly served as the head football coach at the University of California, Berkeley, compiling a record of 4–2–1. He later worked as a stockbroker in association with several Wall Street firms. Kelly died at the age of 66 on March 23, 1942, at Roosevelt Hospital in New York City.

== Head coaching record ==
Year	Team	Overall	Conference	Standing	Bowl/playoffs
California Golden Bears (Independent) (1900)
1900	California	4–2–1			
California:		4–2–1			
Total:		4–2–1			
